= 1980 Boston Red Sox season =

Major League Baseball season

1980 Boston Red Sox
- League: American League
- Division: East
- Ballpark: Fenway Park
- City: Boston
- Record: 83–77 (.519)
- Divisional place: 4th
- Owners: Buddy LeRoux, Haywood Sullivan, Jean Yawkey
- President: Jean Yawkey
- General manager: Haywood Sullivan
- Managers: Don Zimmer (82–73); Johnny Pesky (1–4)
- Television: WSBK-TV, Ch. 38 (Ned Martin, Ken Harrelson)
- Radio: WITS-AM 1510 (Ken Coleman, Jon Miller)
- Stats: ESPN.com; Baseball Reference

The 1980 Boston Red Sox season was the 80th season in the franchise's Major League Baseball history. The Red Sox finished fourth in the American League East with a record of 83 wins and 77 losses, 19 games behind the New York Yankees. Manager Don Zimmer was fired with five games left, and Johnny Pesky finished the season as manager.

== Offseason ==
- November 16, 1979: Tony Pérez was signed as a free agent by the Red Sox.
- March 30, 1980: The Red Sox traded a player to be named later and cash to the Philadelphia Phillies for Dave Rader. The Red Sox completed the deal by sending Stan Papi to the Phillies on May 12.

== Regular season ==
Record by month
Month	Record		Cumulative		AL East		Ref.
Month	Won	Lost	Won	Lost	Position	GB	Ref.
April	8	9	8	9	3rd	1 1/2	
May	14	14	22	23	4th	6 1/2	
June	16	10	38	33	5th	8 1/2	
July	12	16	50	49	6th	12 1/2	
August	20	7	70	56	3rd	6 1/2	
September	12	17	82	73	3rd	16	
October	1	4	83	77	4th	19	

Fred Lynn had a .301 batting average, with 12 home runs and 61 RBIs. Jim Rice hit .294, with 24 homers and 86 RBIs. On the pitching staff, Mike Torrez was 9–16 and Dennis Eckersley was 12–14. Rick Burleson set an MLB single-season record for double plays turned as a shortstop, 147, which still stands.

=== Season standings ===
AL East
Team	W	L	Pct.	GB	Home	Road
New York Yankees	103	59	.636	—	53‍–‍28	50‍–‍31
Baltimore Orioles	100	62	.617	3	50‍–‍31	50‍–‍31
Milwaukee Brewers	86	76	.531	17	40‍–‍42	46‍–‍34
Boston Red Sox	83	77	.519	19	36‍–‍45	47‍–‍32
Detroit Tigers	84	78	.519	19	43‍–‍38	41‍–‍40
Cleveland Indians	79	81	.494	23	44‍–‍35	35‍–‍46
Toronto Blue Jays	67	95	.414	36	35‍–‍46	32‍–‍49

Boston's record of 83–77 has a fractionally better winning percentage than Detroit's record of 84–78; .51875 and .51851, respectively.

=== Record vs. opponents ===
1980 American League record Sources:
Team	BAL	BOS	CAL	CWS	CLE	DET	KC	MIL	MIN	NYY	OAK	SEA	TEX	TOR
Baltimore	—	8–5	10–2	6–6	6–7	10–3	6–6	7–6	10–2	7–6	7–5	6–6	6–6	11–2
Boston	5–8	—	9–3	6–4	7–6	8–5	5–7	6–7	6–6	3–10	9–3	7–5	5–7	7–6
California	2–10	3–9	—	3–10	4–6	5–7	5–8	6–6	7–6	2–10	3–10	11–2	11–2	3–9
Chicago	6–6	4–6	10–3	—	5–7	2–10	5–8	5–7	5–8	5–7	6–7	6–7	6–7–2	5–7
Cleveland	7–6	6–7	6–4	7–5	—	3–10	5–7	3–10	9–3	5–8	6–6	8–4	6–6	8–5
Detroit	3–10	5–8	7–5	10–2	10–3	—	2–10	7–6	6–6	5–8	6–6	10–2–1	4–8	9–4
Kansas City	6–6	7–5	8–5	8–5	7–5	10–2	—	6–6	5–8	8–4	6–7	7–6	10–3	9–3
Milwaukee	6–7	7–6	6–6	7–5	10–3	6–7	6–6	—	7–5	5–8	7–5	9–3	5–7	5–8
Minnesota	2–10	6–6	6–7	8–5	3–9	6–6	8–5	5–7	—	4–8	6–7	7–6	9–3	7–5
New York	6–7	10–3	10–2	7–5	8–5	8–5	4–8	8–5	8–4	—	8–4	9–3	7–5	10–3
Oakland	5–7	3–9	10–3	7–6	6–6	6–6	7–6	5–7	7–6	4–8	—	8–5	7–6	8–4
Seattle	6–6	5–7	2–11	7–6	4–8	2–10–1	6–7	3–9	6–7	3–9	5–8	—	4–9	6–6
Texas	6–6	7–5	2–11	7–6–2	6–6	8–4	3–10	7–5	3–9	5–7	6–7	9–4	—	7–5
Toronto	2–11	6–7	9–3	7–5	5–8	4–9	3–9	8–5	5–7	3–10	4–8	6–6	5–7	—

=== Notable transactions ===
- May 30, 1980: Ted Sizemore was released by the Red Sox.
- June 3, 1980: Oil Can Boyd was drafted by the Red Sox in the 16th round of the 1980 Major League Baseball draft.

=== Opening Day lineup ===
2	Jerry Remy	2B
7	Rick Burleson	SS
19	Fred Lynn	CF
14	Jim Rice	LF
8	Carl Yastrzemski	DH
5	Tony Pérez	1B
4	Butch Hobson	3B
24	Dwight Evans	RF
15	Dave Rader	C
43	Dennis Eckersley	P

The Milwaukee Brewers defeated the Red Sox on Opening Day, 9–5, via a walk-off grand slam by Sixto Lezcano.

=== Roster ===
1980 Boston Red Sox
Roster
Pitchers: 45 Luis Aponte; 28 Jack Billingham; 16 Tom Burgmeier; 22 Bill Campbell; 28 Steve Crawford; 41 Dick Drago; 43 Dennis Eckersley; 47 Bruce Hurst; 38 Skip Lockwood; 31 Keith MacWhorter; 28 Bob Ojeda; 42 Chuck Rainey; 49 Win Remmerswaal; 25 Steve Renko; 46 Bob Stanley; 21 Mike Torrez; 30 John Tudor	Catchers: 39 Gary Allenson; 27 Carlton Fisk; 50 Rich Gedman; 15 Dave Rader; Infielders: 3 Jack Brohamer; 7 Rick Burleson; 4 Butch Hobson; 18 Glenn Hoffman; 12 Stan Papi; 5 Tony Pérez; 2 Jerry Remy; 11 Ted Sizemore; 11,26 Dave Stapleton; 12 Julio Valdez; 3 Chico Walker; 20 Larry Wolfe	Outfielders: 29 Sam Bowen; 1 Jim Dwyer; 24 Dwight Evans; 37 Garry Hancock; 19 Fred Lynn; 51 Reid Nichols; 14 Jim Rice; 8 Carl Yastrzemski	Managers: 35 Johnny Pesky; 23 Don Zimmer; Coaches: 32 Tommy Harper (First base); 33 Walt Hriniak (Bullpen); 35 Johnny Pesky (Hitting); 34 Johnny Podres (Pitching); 36 Eddie Yost (Third base)

== Player stats ==
=== Batting ===
Note: G = Games played; AB = At bats; R = Runs; H = Hits; 2B = Doubles; 3B = Triples; HR = Home runs; RBI = Runs batted in; SB = Stolen bases; BB = Walks; AVG = Batting average; SLG = Slugging average

Player	G	AB	R	H	2B	3B	HR	RBI	SB	BB	AVG	SLG
Rick Burleson	155	644	89	179	29	2	8	51	12	62	.278	.366
Tony Pérez	151	585	73	161	31	3	25	105	1	41	.275	.467
Jim Rice	124	504	81	148	22	6	24	86	8	30	.294	.504
Carlton Fisk	131	478	73	138	25	3	18	62	11	36	.289	.467
Dwight Evans	148	463	72	123	37	5	18	60	3	64	.266	.484
Dave Stapleton	106	449	61	144	33	5	7	45	3	13	.321	.463
Fred Lynn	110	415	67	125	32	3	12	61	12	58	.301	.480
Carl Yastrzemski	105	364	49	100	21	1	15	50	0	44	.275	.462
Butch Hobson	93	324	35	74	6	0	11	39	1	25	.228	.349
Glenn Hoffman	114	312	37	89	15	4	4	42	2	19	.285	.397
Jim Dwyer	93	260	41	74	11	1	9	38	3	28	.285	.438
Jerry Remy	63	230	24	72	7	2	0	9	14	10	.313	.361
Dave Rader	50	137	14	45	11	0	3	17	1	14	.328	.474
Garry Hancock	46	115	9	33	6	0	4	19	0	3	.287	.443
Gary Allenson	36	70	9	25	6	0	0	10	2	13	.357	.443
Chico Walker	19	57	3	12	0	0	1	5	3	6	.211	.263
Jack Brohamer	21	57	5	18	2	0	1	6	0	4	.316	.404
Reid Nichols	12	36	5	8	0	1	0	3	0	3	.222	.278
Rich Gedman	9	24	2	5	0	0	0	1	0	0	.208	.208
Larry Wolfe	18	23	3	3	1	0	1	4	0	0	.130	.304
Ted Sizemore	9	23	1	5	1	0	0	0	0	0	.217	.261
Julio Valdez	8	19	4	5	1	0	1	4	2	0	.263	.474
Sam Bowen	7	13	0	2	0	0	0	0	1	2	.154	.154
Dick Drago	3	1	0	0	0	0	0	0	0	0	.000	.000
Stan Papi	1	0	0	0	0	0	0	0	0	0	.---	.---
Team totals	160	5603	757	1588	297	36	162	717	79	475	.283	.436

=== Pitching ===
Note: W = Wins; L = Losses; ERA = Earned run average; G = Games pitched; GS = Games started; SV = Saves; IP = Innings pitched; H = Hits allowed; R = Runs allowed; ER = Earned runs allowed; BB = Walks allowed; SO = Strikeouts

Player	W	L	ERA	G	GS	SV	IP	H	R	ER	BB	SO
Mike Torrez	9	16	5.08	36	32	0	207.1	256	124	117	75	97
Dennis Eckersley	12	14	4.28	30	30	0	197.2	188	101	94	44	121
Bob Stanley	10	8	3.39	52	17	14	175.0	186	75	66	52	71
Steve Renko	9	9	4.19	32	23	0	165.1	180	86	77	56	90
Dick Drago	7	7	4.14	43	7	3	132.2	127	67	61	44	63
Tom Burgmeier	5	4	2.00	62	0	24	99.0	87	30	22	20	54
John Tudor	8	5	3.02	16	13	0	92.1	81	35	31	31	45
Chuck Rainey	8	3	4.86	16	13	0	87.0	92	49	47	41	43
Skip Lockwood	3	1	5.32	24	1	2	45.2	61	31	27	17	11
Keith MacWhorter	0	3	5.53	14	2	0	42.1	46	27	26	18	21
Bill Campbell	4	0	4.79	23	0	0	41.1	44	26	22	22	17
Win Remmerswaal	2	1	4.58	14	0	0	35.1	39	18	18	9	20
Steve Crawford	2	0	3.62	6	4	0	32.1	41	14	13	8	10
Bruce Hurst	2	2	9.10	12	7	0	30.2	39	33	31	16	16
Bob Ojeda	1	1	6.92	7	7	0	26.0	39	20	20	14	12
Jack Billingham	1	3	11.10	7	4	0	24.1	45	30	30	12	4
Luis Aponte	0	0	1.29	4	0	0	7.0	6	1	1	2	1
Team totals	83	77	4.38	160	160	43	1441.1	1557	767	701	481	696

== Statistical leaders ==
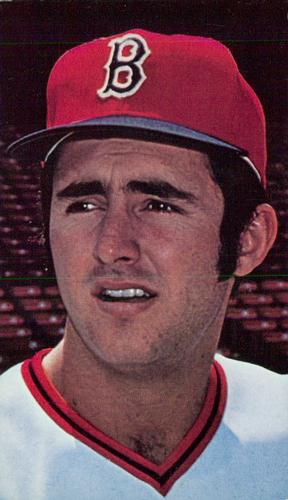
Fred Lynn

Category	Player	Statistic
Youngest player	Rich Gedman	20
Oldest player	Carl Yastrzemski	40
Wins Above Replacement	Fred Lynn	4.7

=== Batting ===
Abbr.	Category	Player	Statistic
G	Games played	Rick Burleson	155
PA	Plate appearances	Rick Burleson	718
AB	At bats	Rick Burleson	644
R	Runs scored	Rick Burleson	89
H	Hits	Rick Burleson	179
2B	Doubles	Dwight Evans	37
3B	Triples	Jim Rice	6
HR	Home runs	Tony Pérez	25
RBI	Runs batted in	Tony Pérez	105
SB	Stolen bases	Jerry Remy	14
CS	Caught stealing	Rick Burleson	13
BB	Base on balls	Dwight Evans	64
SO	Strikeouts	Dwight Evans	98
BA	Batting average	Jim Rice	.294
OBP	On-base percentage	Fred Lynn	.383
SLG	Slugging percentage	Jim Rice	.504
OPS	On-base plus slugging	Fred Lynn	.862
OPS+	Adjusted OPS	Fred Lynn	130
TB	Total bases	Tony Pérez	273
GIDP	Grounded into double play	Tony Pérez	25
HBP	Hit by pitch	Carlton Fisk	13
SH	Sacrifice hits	Glenn Hoffman	9
SF	Sacrifice flies	Tony Pérez	8
IBB	Intentional base on balls	Tony Pérez	11

=== Pitching ===
Abbr.	Category	Player	Statistic
W	Wins	Dennis Eckersley	12
L	Losses	Mike Torrez	16
W-L %	Winning percentage	Chuck Rainey	.727 (8–3)
ERA	Earned run average	Bob Stanley	3.39
G	Games pitched	Tom Burgmeier	62
GS	Games started	Mike Torrez	32
GF	Games finished	Tom Burgmeier	38
CG	Complete games	Dennis Eckersley	8
SHO	Shutouts	3 tied	1
SV	Saves	Tom Burgmeier	24
IP	Innings pitched	Mike Torrez	207 1/3
SO	Strikeouts	Dennis Eckersley	121
WHIP	Walks plus hits per inning pitched	Dennis Eckersley	1.174

== Awards and honors ==
- Fred Lynn – Gold Glove Award (OF)
- Chuck Rainey – AL Pitcher of the Month (May)
- Jim Rice – AL Player of the Month (September)
- Bob Stanley – AL Pitcher of the Month (August)

All-Star Game

- Tom Burgmeier, reserve P
- Carlton Fisk, starting C
- Fred Lynn, starting CF
- Jim Rice, reserve OF

== Farm system ==
Level	Team	League	Manager
AAA	Pawtucket Red Sox	International League	Joe Morgan
AA	Bristol Red Sox	Eastern League	Tony Torchia
A	Winston-Salem Red Sox	Carolina League	Buddy Hunter
A	Winter Haven Red Sox	Florida State League	Rac Slider
A-Short Season	Elmira Pioneers	New York–Penn League	Dick Berardino
