= 1982 Boston Red Sox season =

Major League Baseball season

1982 Boston Red Sox
- League: American League
- Division: East
- Ballpark: Fenway Park
- City: Boston
- Record: 89–73 (.549)
- Divisional place: 3rd
- Owners: Buddy LeRoux, Haywood Sullivan, Jean Yawkey
- President: Jean Yawkey
- General manager: Haywood Sullivan
- Manager: Ralph Houk
- Television: WSBK-TV, Ch. 38 (Ned Martin, Bob Montgomery)
- Radio: WITS-AM 1510 (Ken Coleman, Jon Miller)
- Stats: ESPN.com; Baseball Reference

The 1982 Boston Red Sox season was the 82nd season in the franchise's Major League Baseball history. The Red Sox finished third in the American League East with a record of 89 wins and 73 losses, six games behind the Milwaukee Brewers, who went on to win the AL championship.

== Offseason ==
- February 25, 1982: Mark Fidrych was signed as a free agent by the Red Sox.

== Regular season ==
Record by month
Month	Record		Cumulative		AL East		Ref.
Month	Won	Lost	Won	Lost	Position	GB	Ref.
April	13	7	13	7	1st	+1/2	
May	17	10	30	17	1st	+1/2	
June	14	12	44	29	1st	+2	
July	14	14	58	43	2nd	1/2	
August	15	15	73	58	2nd	4 1/2	
September	13	15	86	73	3rd	8 1/2	
October	3	0	89	73	3rd	6	

=== Highlights ===
In his second year as Red Sox manager, Ralph Houk kept the Sox clubhouse on an even keel, and while Boston helped make the season interesting, it was the Milwaukee Brewers all the way finishing at 95–67, one game ahead of the Baltimore Orioles, and six up on third-place Boston.

Boston's best that year was a bullpen featuring Mark Clear, with 14 wins and 14 saves, and Bob Stanley, with 12 wins and 14 saves. John Tudor, who had been a disappointing 4–3 in 1981, was 13–10. Dennis Eckersley was 13–13 and Mike Torrez 9–9. Torrez would be traded in the offseason.

Carney Lansford hit .301 this year, only his second, and his last as a Red Sox. Jim Rice hit .309, with 24 homers and 97 RBIs, and Dwight Evans had another big year: .292, 32 homers and 98 RBIs. Carl Yastrzemski, heading toward the end of his career, hit .275, with 16 homers and 72 RBIs. A catcher named Rich Gedman from Worcester, Massachusetts, hit .249. A rookie also came up and surprised a lot of people: Wade Boggs had been the top hitter in the minors the previous year but had a hard time staying with Boston. He made his major league debut on April 10, 1982, in a game against the Baltimore Orioles, going 0 for 4. Once he got into the lineup on June 25, when Lansford was hurt, he stayed on and hit .349.

=== Season standings ===
AL East
Team	W	L	Pct.	GB	Home	Road
Milwaukee Brewers	95	67	.586	—	48‍–‍34	47‍–‍33
Baltimore Orioles	94	68	.580	1	53‍–‍28	41‍–‍40
Boston Red Sox	89	73	.549	6	49‍–‍32	40‍–‍41
Detroit Tigers	83	79	.512	12	47‍–‍34	36‍–‍45
New York Yankees	79	83	.488	16	42‍–‍39	37‍–‍44
Cleveland Indians	78	84	.481	17	41‍–‍40	37‍–‍44
Toronto Blue Jays	78	84	.481	17	44‍–‍37	34‍–‍47

=== Record vs. opponents ===
1982 American League record Sources:
Team	BAL	BOS	CAL	CWS	CLE	DET	KC	MIL	MIN	NYY	OAK	SEA	TEX	TOR
Baltimore	—	4–9	7–5	5–7	6–7	7–6	4–8	9–4–1	8–4	11–2	7–5	7–5	9–3	10–3
Boston	9–4	—	7–5	4–8	6–7	8–5	6–6	4–9	6–6	7–6	8–4	7–5	10–2	7–6
California	5–7	5–7	—	8–5	8–4	5–7	7–6	6–6	7–6	7–5	9–4	10–3	8–5	8–4
Chicago	7–5	8–4	5–8	—	6–6	9–3	3–10	3–9	7–6	8–4	9–4	6–7	8–5	8–4
Cleveland	7–6	7–6	4–8	6–6	—	6–7	2–10	7–6	8–4	4–9	4–8	9–3	7–5	7–6
Detroit	6–7	5–8	7–5	3–9	7–6	—	6–6	3–10	9–3	8–5	9–3	6–6	8–4	6–7
Kansas City	8–4	6–6	6–7	10–3	10–2	6–6	—	7–5	7–6	5–7	7–6	7–6	7–6	4–8
Milwaukee	4–9–1	9–4	6–6	9–3	6–7	10–3	5–7	—	7–5	8–5	7–5	8–4	7–5	9–4
Minnesota	4–8	6–6	6–7	6–7	4–8	3–9	6–7	5–7	—	2–10	3–10	5–8	5–8	5–7
New York	2–11	6–7	5–7	4–8	9–4	5–8	7–5	5–8	10–2	—	7–5	6–6	7–5	6–7
Oakland	5–7	4–8	4–9	4–9	8–4	3–9	6–7	5–7	10–3	5–7	—	6–7	5–8	3–9
Seattle	5–7	5–7	3–10	7–6	3–9	6–6	6–7	4–8	8–5	6–6	7–6	—	9–4	7–5
Texas	3–9	2–10	5–8	5–8	5–7	4–8	6–7	5–7	8–5	5–7	8–5	4–9	—	4–8
Toronto	3–10	6–7	4–8	4–8	6–7	7–6	8–4	4–9	7–5	7–6	9–3	5–7	8–4	—

=== Notable transactions ===
- June 7, 1982: In the 1982 Major League Baseball draft, the Red Sox drafted Sam Horn in the first round (16th pick) and Kevin Romine in the second round.

=== Opening Day lineup ===
Opening Day had been scheduled for April 5 at Comiskey Park again the Chicago White Sox, but it was postponed due to snow. Additional games were also postponed due to weather conditions. The team finally started their season on April 10, with a doubleheader against the Baltimore Orioles at Memorial Stadium.

24	Dwight Evans	RF
18	Glenn Hoffman	SS
14	Jim Rice	LF
8	Carl Yastrzemski	1B
4	Carney Lansford	3B
11	Dave Stapleton	2B
5	Tony Pérez	DH
39	Gary Allenson	C
51	Reid Nichols	CF
43	Dennis Eckersley	P

=== Alumni game ===
Before a scheduled game with the Texas Rangers on May 1, the Red Sox held their first old-timers game at Fenway, marking 50-years of ownership by the Yawkey family. It was notable for the participation of 63-year-old Red Sox legend Ted Williams, who made a shoestring catch while playing the outfield. Other participants included Bobby Doerr, Boo Ferriss, Jackie Jensen, Bob Montgomery, Johnny Pesky, and Jimmy Piersall.

=== Roster ===
1982 Boston Red Sox
Roster
Pitchers: 45 Luis Aponte; 23 Oil Can Boyd; 27 Mike Brown; 16 Tom Burgmeier; 25 Mark Clear; 28 Steve Crawford; 31 Brian Denman; 43 Dennis Eckersley; 47 Bruce Hurst; 19 Bob Ojeda; 42 Chuck Rainey; 46 Bob Stanley; 21 Mike Torrez; 30 John Tudor	Catchers: 39 Gary Allenson; 10 Rich Gedman; 54 Roger LaFrancois; 15 Marc Sullivan; Infielders: 17 Marty Barrett; 26 Wade Boggs; 18 Glenn Hoffman; 22 Ed Jurak; 4 Carney Lansford; 2 Jerry Remy; 11 Dave Stapleton; 12 Julio Valdez	Outfielders: 24 Dwight Evans; 37 Garry Hancock; 3 Rick Miller; 51 Reid Nichols; 14 Jim Rice; Designated hitters: 5 Tony Pérez; 8 Carl Yastrzemski	Manager: 35 Ralph Houk; Coaches: 32 Tommy Harper (First base); 33 Walt Hriniak (Bullpen); 6 Johnny Pesky (Hitting); 34 Lee Stange (Pitching); 36 Eddie Yost (Third base)

== Player stats ==
=== Batting ===
Note: G = Games played; AB = At bats; R = Runs; H = Hits; 2B = Doubles; 3B = Triples; HR = Home runs; RBI = Runs batted in; SB = Stolen bases; BB = Walks; AVG = Batting average; SLG = Slugging average

Player	G	AB	R	H	2B	3B	HR	RBI	SB	BB	AVG	SLG
Jerry Remy	155	636	89	178	22	3	0	47	16	55	.280	.324
Dwight Evans	162	609	122	178	37	7	32	98	3	112	.292	.534
Jim Rice	145	573	86	177	24	5	24	97	0	55	.309	.494
Dave Stapleton	150	538	66	142	28	1	14	65	2	31	.264	.398
Carney Lansford	128	482	65	145	28	4	11	63	9	46	.301	.444
Glenn Hoffman	150	469	53	98	23	2	7	49	0	30	.209	.311
Carl Yastrzemski	131	459	53	126	22	1	16	72	0	59	.275	.431
Rick Miller	135	409	50	104	13	2	4	38	5	40	.254	.325
Wade Boggs	104	338	51	118	14	1	5	44	1	35	.349	.441
Rich Gedman	92	289	30	72	17	2	4	26	0	10	.249	.363
Gary Allenson	92	264	25	54	11	0	6	33	0	38	.205	.314
Reid Nichols	92	245	35	74	16	1	7	33	5	14	.302	.461
Tony Pérez	69	196	18	51	14	2	6	31	0	19	.260	.444
Ed Jurak	12	21	3	7	0	0	0	7	0	2	.333	.333
Julio Valdez	28	20	3	5	1	0	0	1	1	0	.250	.300
Marty Barrett	8	18	0	1	0	0	0	0	0	0	.000	.000
Garry Hancock	11	14	3	0	0	0	0	0	0	1	.000	.000
Roger LaFrancois	8	10	1	4	1	0	0	1	0	0	.400	.500
Marc Sullivan	2	6	0	2	0	0	0	0	0	0	.333	.333
Team totals	162	5596	753	1536	271	31	136	705	42	547	.274	.407

=== Pitching ===
Note: W = Wins; L = Losses; ERA = Earned run average; G = Games pitched; GS = Games started; SV = Saves; IP = Innings pitched; H = Hits allowed; R = Runs allowed; ER = Earned runs allowed; BB = Walks allowed; SO = Strikeouts

Player	W	L	ERA	G	GS	SV	IP	H	R	ER	BB	SO
Dennis Eckersley	13	13	3.73	33	33	0	224.1	228	101	93	43	127
John Tudor	13	10	3.63	32	30	0	195.2	215	90	79	59	146
Mike Torrez	9	9	5.23	31	31	0	175.2	196	107	102	74	84
Bob Stanley	12	7	3.10	48	0	14	168.1	161	60	58	50	83
Chuck Rainey	7	5	5.02	27	25	0	129.0	146	75	72	63	57
Bruce Hurst	3	7	5.77	28	19	0	117.0	161	87	75	40	53
Mark Clear	14	9	3.00	55	0	14	105.0	92	39	35	61	109
Tom Burgmeier	7	0	2.29	40	0	2	102.1	98	30	26	22	44
Luis Aponte	2	2	3.18	40	0	3	85.0	78	31	30	25	44
Bob Ojeda	4	6	5.63	22	14	0	78.1	95	53	49	29	52
Brian Denman	3	4	4.78	9	9	0	49.0	55	32	26	9	9
Steve Crawford	1	0	2.00	5	0	0	9.0	14	3	2	0	2
Oil Can Boyd	0	1	5.40	3	1	0	8.1	11	5	5	2	2
Mike Brown	1	0	0.00	3	0	0	6.0	7	0	0	1	4
Team totals	89	73	4.03	162	162	33	1453.0	1557	713	651	478	816

== Statistical leaders ==
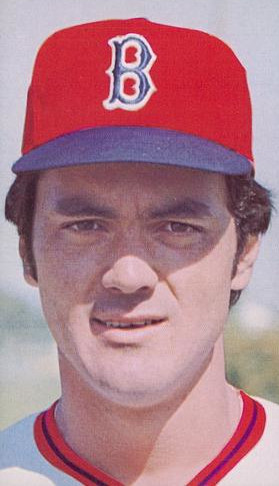
Dwight Evans

Category	Player	Statistic
Youngest player	Oil Can Boyd; Rich Gedman	22
Oldest player	Carl Yastrzemski	42
Wins Above Replacement	Dwight Evans	6.4

=== Batting ===
Abbr.	Category	Player	Statistic
G	Games played	Dwight Evans	162
PA	Plate appearances	Dwight Evans	727
AB	At bats	Jerry Remy	636
R	Runs scored	Dwight Evans	122
H	Hits	Dwight Evans	178
H	Hits	Jerry Remy	178
2B	Doubles	Dwight Evans	37
3B	Triples	Dwight Evans	7
HR	Home runs	Dwight Evans	32
RBI	Runs batted in	Dwight Evans	98
SB	Stolen bases	Jerry Remy	16
CS	Caught stealing	Jerry Remy	9
BB	Base on balls	Dwight Evans	112
SO	Strikeouts	Dwight Evans	125
BA	Batting average	Jim Rice	.309
OBP	On-base percentage	Dwight Evans	.402
SLG	Slugging percentage	Dwight Evans	.534
OPS	On-base plus slugging	Dwight Evans	.936
OPS+	Adjusted OPS	Dwight Evans	149
TB	Total bases	Dwight Evans	325
GIDP	Grounded into double play	Jim Rice	29
HBP	Hit by pitch	Jim Rice	7
SH	Sacrifice hits	Jerry Remy	18
SF	Sacrifice flies	Carney Lansford	8
IBB	Intentional base on balls	Jim Rice	6

=== Pitching ===
Abbr.	Category	Player	Statistic
W	Wins	Mark Clear	14
L	Losses	Dennis Eckersley	13
W-L %	Winning percentage	Bob Stanley	.632 (12–7)
ERA	Earned run average	Bob Stanley	3.10
G	Games pitched	Mark Clear	55
GS	Games started	Dennis Eckersley	33
GF	Games finished	Mark Clear	44
CG	Complete games	Dennis Eckersley	11
SHO	Shutouts	Dennis Eckersley	3
SHO	Shutouts	Chuck Rainey	3
SV	Saves	Mark Clear	14
SV	Saves	Bob Stanley	14
IP	Innings pitched	Dennis Eckersley	224 1/3
SO	Strikeouts	John Tudor	146
WHIP	Walks plus hits per inning pitched	Dennis Eckersley	1.208

== Awards and honors ==
- Dwight Evans – Gold Glove Award (OF)

All-Star Game

- Mark Clear, reserve P
- Dennis Eckersley, starting P
- Carl Yastrzemski, reserve OF

== Farm system ==
Level	Team	League	Manager
AAA	Pawtucket Red Sox	International League	Joe Morgan
AA	Bristol Red Sox	Eastern League	Tony Torchia
A	Winston-Salem Red Sox	Carolina League	Rac Slider
A	Winter Haven Red Sox	Florida State League	Tom Kotchman
A-Short Season	Elmira Suns	New York–Penn League	Dick Berardino
