= Longest professional baseball game =

1981 baseball game in Rhode Island, US

The longest professional baseball game in history
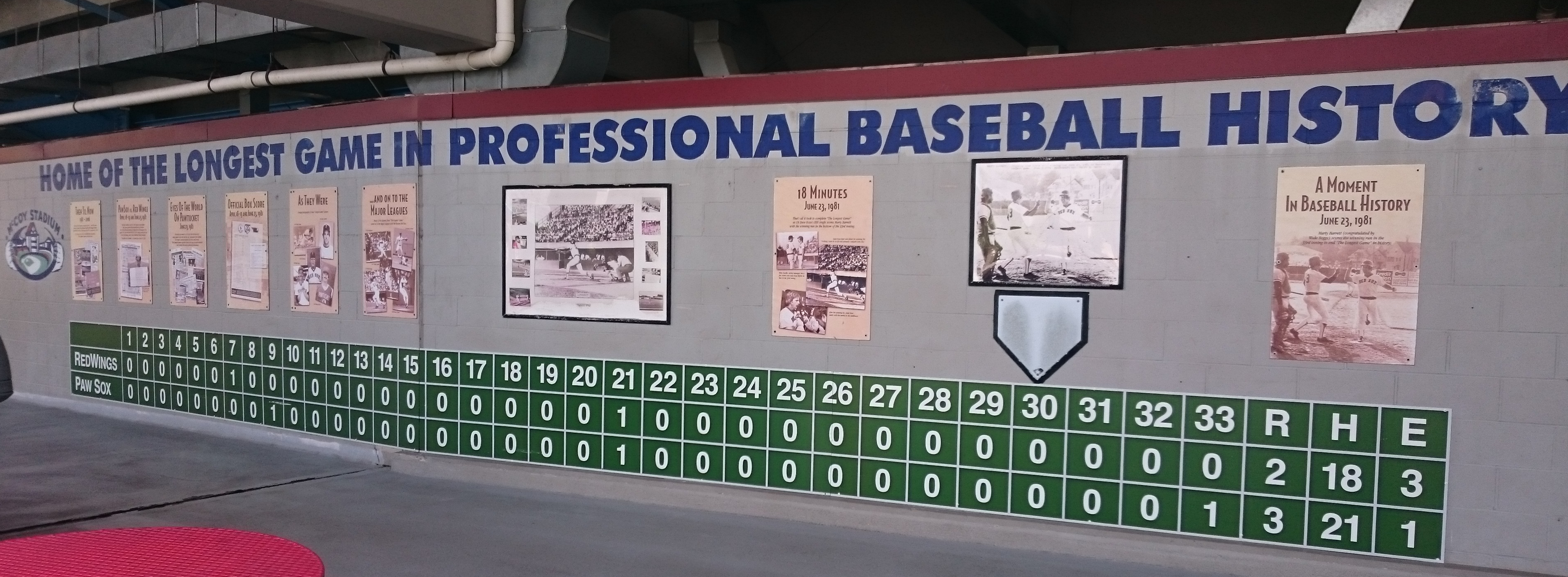
- Line score exhibit at McCoy Stadium
Rochester Red Wings	Pawtucket Red Sox
2	3
- The line score below has several runless extra innings omitted.
	1	2	3	4	5	6	7	8	9	10	20	21	22	32	33	R	H	E
Rochester Red Wings	0	0	0	0	0	0	1	0	0	0	0	1	0	0	0	2	18	3
Pawtucket Red Sox	0	0	0	0	0	0	0	0	1	0	0	1	0	0	1	3	21	1
- Date: April 18–19, and June 23, 1981
- Venue: McCoy Stadium
- City: Pawtucket, Rhode Island
- Managers: Doc Edwards (Rochester Red Wings); Joe Morgan (Pawtucket Red Sox)
- Umpires: Dennis Cregg, Jack Leitz
- Attendance: ~1,740 (beginning of the game on April 18); 20 (end of the 32nd inning on April 19); 5,746 (33rd inning on June 23)
- Time of game: 8 hours and 25 minutes

The Pawtucket Red Sox and the Rochester Red Wings, two teams from the Triple-A International League at the time affiliated with the Boston Red Sox and Baltimore Orioles respectively, played the longest game in professional baseball history over three days in 1981. The game lasted 33 innings, with 8 hours and 25 minutes of playing time. The first 32 innings were played overnight from April 18–19, 1981, at McCoy Stadium in Pawtucket, Rhode Island, and the tie-breaking 33rd inning was played June 23, 1981. Pawtucket won the game, 3–2.

== The game ==
The game commenced on Saturday, April 18, 1981, at 8:25 p.m., after a delay of around 30 minutes due to problems with the stadium lights, with an estimated 1,740 in attendance. It continued throughout the night and into Easter morning. Although most leagues had a curfew rule that would have suspended the game—the International League's activates at 12:50 a.m.—the copy of the rule book of home plate umpire Dennis Cregg failed to mention this cutoff time. After Pawtucket's Russ Laribee's sacrifice fly drove in Chico Walker in the bottom of the ninth inning and tied the game at one run each, the teams continued playing.

Several times, a team came close to victory before circumstances changed. When Wade Boggs drove in the tying run in the bottom of the 21st inning after a Rochester run, even the Pawtucket players groaned. He recalled, "I didn't know if the guys on the team wanted to hug me or slug me." The weather was so cold that players burned broken bats and the stadium's wooden benches to warm themselves, and the clubhouses ran out of food. The wind blew into the infield, making hits difficult; Pawtucket's Dave Koza later said that otherwise his team would have won in nine innings, with "four or five shots that would have been out of the park". For example, Sam Bowen hit a fly ball to center that reportedly left the field before the wind blew it back to Rochester outfielder Dallas Williams. Williams went 0–for–13 in 15 plate appearances, one of many records achieved during the game.

After Pawtucket's Luis Aponte pitched the seventh to tenth innings in relief, manager Joe Morgan—who himself would be ejected in the 22nd inning by Cregg—let him leave before the game ended. Aponte's wife did not believe his explanation for coming home at 3 a.m. Sunday. He promised that the Sunday newspaper would prove his story, but since the game's postponement occurred too late to appear in it, Aponte had to wait until the Monday edition. Cregg had brought his nephew David to the game; David's father became concerned for his family and called the police, who told him that the game had not ended.

By 4 a.m. the players were "delirious" from exhaustion; Rochester's Dave Huppert had caught the first 31 innings before being replaced, and Jim Umbarger pitched 10 scoreless innings from the 23rd inning, striking out nine and giving up four hits. The president of the league, Harold Cooper, was finally reached on the phone by Pawtucket general manager Mike Tamburro sometime after 3:00 a.m.; the horrified Cooper ordered that play stop at the end of the current inning. Finally at 4:07 a.m., at the end of the 32nd inning and more than eight hours after it began, the game was stopped. There were 19 fans left in the seats—not including David Cregg, who had fallen asleep—all of whom received season or lifetime passes to McCoy Stadium. As the players went home to rest before returning at 11 a.m. for an afternoon game that Sunday, they saw people going to Easter sunrise service. When Boggs' father complimented him for getting four hits in the game, the player admitted that he actually had 12 at bats.

Both teams signed a baseball on Sunday for display at the Baseball Hall of Fame. Cooper had suggested that the game resume that day, but Rochester manager Doc Edwards requested a delay because of the risk of injury. Instead, it resumed on the evening of Tuesday, June 23, the next time the Red Wings were in town. A sellout crowd of 5,746 and 140 reporters from around the world were present, partly because the major leagues were on strike at the time; the players voted against an offer to resume the game at Fenway Park to avoid crossing the picket line. On that evening, it took just one inning and 18 minutes to finish the game, with Koza driving in the winning run in the bottom of the 33rd. The losing pitcher was Steve Grilli, who had joined Rochester in the interim since the game's suspension.

The Pawtucket Red Sox celebrated the 25th anniversary of the game on June 23, 2006. Many members of both teams attended a luncheon and round table discussion in Providence, Rhode Island, and a ceremony was held before the game against the Columbus Clippers that night. Dennis Cregg says that he thinks that his nephew, David Cregg, has never attended another baseball game.

In 2025, as work was being done to demolish McCoy Stadium, a time capsule was found containing memorabilia from the game, including the game’s scorecard and baseballs signed by players from both teams. The time capsule was opened on June 23, the 44th anniversary of the game’s completion.

== Professional records set in the game ==
- Most innings: 33
- Total time for one game: 8 hours, 25 minutes
- Most putouts by one team in one game: 99 (PAW)
- Most total putouts in one game: 195
- Most at-bats for one team in one game: 114 (PAW)
- Most total at-bats in one game: 219
- Most strikeouts (batting) by one team in one game: 34 (ROC)
- Most total strikeouts in one game: 60
- Most total assists in one game: 88
- Most at-bats by one player in one game: 14, Dave Koza, Lee Graham, Chico Walker (all PAW)
- Most plate appearances by one player in one game: 15, Tom Eaton, Cal Ripken Jr., Dallas Williams (all ROC)
- Most strikeouts (batting) by one player in a game: 7, Russ Laribee (PAW)

Sources:

- Longest plate appearance by a single umpire: Dennis Cregg (882 pitches over 8 hours and 25 minutes)

== Line score ==
June 23, 1981 at McCoy Stadium, Pawtucket, Rhode Island
Team	1	2	3	4	5	6	7	8	9	10	11	12	13	14	15	16	17	18	19	20	21	22	23	24	25	26	27	28	29	30	31	32	33	R	H	E
Rochester Red Wings	0	0	0	0	0	0	1	0	0	0	0	0	0	0	0	0	0	0	0	0	1	0	0	0	0	0	0	0	0	0	0	0	0	2	18	3
Pawtucket Red Sox	0	0	0	0	0	0	0	0	1	0	0	0	0	0	0	0	0	0	0	0	1	0	0	0	0	0	0	0	0	0	0	0	1	3	21	1
WP: Bob Ojeda LP: Steve Grilli; Attendance: ~1,740 (top of the 1st, April 18); 20 (bottom of the 32nd, April 19); 5,746 (June 23); Notes: No outs when winning run scored.

== Box scores ==
=== Batting ===
Rochester
Player	Pos.	AB	Runs	Hits	RBI
Eaton	2B	10	0	3	0
Williams	CF	13	0	0	0
Ripken	3B	13	0	2	0
Corey	DH	5	1	1	0
Chism	PH	1	0	0	0
Rayford	C	5	0	0	0
Logan	1B	12	0	4	0
Valle	1B	1	0	0	0
Bourjos	LF	4	0	2	1
Hale	LF	7	0	1	0
Smith	LF	0	0	0	0
Hazewood	RF	4	0	0	0
Hart	RF	6	1	1	0
Bonner	SS	12	0	3	0
Huppert	C	11	0	0	1
Putman	PH	1	0	0	0
Totals		105	2	18	2

Pawtucket
Player	Pos.	AB	Run	Hits	RBI
Graham	CF	14	0	1	0
Barrett	2B	12	1	2	0
Walker	LF	14	1	2	0
Laribee	DH	11	0	0	1
Koza	1B	14	1	5	1
Boggs	3B	12	0	4	1
Bowen	RF	12	0	2	0
Gedman	C	3	0	1	0
Ongarato	PH	1	0	0	0
LaFrancois	C	8	0	2	0
Valdez	SS	13	0	2	0
Totals		114	3	21	3

=== Pitching ===
Rochester
Player	IP	H	R	ER	BB	K
Jones	8.2	7	1	1	2	5
Schneider	5.1	2	0	0	0	8
Luebber	8	6	1	1	2	4
Umbarger	10	4	0	0	0	9
Grilli (L)	0	0	1	1	1	0
Speck	0	1	0	0	0	0
Totals	32	21	3	3	5	26
Grilli pitched to 3 batters in the 33rd Speck pitched to 1 batter in the 33rd WP - Jones

Pawtucket
Player	IP	H	R	ER	BB	K
Parks	6	3	1	1	4	3
Aponte	4	0	0	0	2	9
Sarmiento	4	3	0	0	2	3
Smithson	3.2	2	0	0	3	5
Remmerswaal	4.1	4	1	1	3	3
Finch	5	3	0	0	1	3
Hurst	5	3	0	0	1	3
Ojeda (W)	1	1	0	0	0	1
Totals	33	18	2	2	18	34
Parks pitched to 3 batters in the 7th WP - Smithson, Hurst.

== Game notes and statistics ==
- Russ Laribee of the PawSox went 0–for–11 with a sacrifice fly, striking out seven times, becoming the first player in history to surpass the titanium sombrero (six strikeout) level. Based on a nine-inning game, Laribee would only have struck out three times per nine innings.
- Between the two teams, pitchers faced a total of 246 batters (219 AB, 23 BB, 4 HBP).
- A total of 882 pitches were thrown.
- Pawtucket's Dave Koza had the most hits of any player in the game: five, including the game-winner.
- 53 runners were left on base (30 by Rochester and 23 by Pawtucket).

== Players involved ==
Two future inductees for the Baseball Hall of Fame were part of the historic game. Cal Ripken Jr., who was inducted in 2007, went 2-for-13 on the night playing third base for Rochester. Ripken made his major league debut two months after the game was completed, and was the American League's Rookie of the Year in 1982. Wade Boggs, who was inducted in 2005, played third base for Pawtucket and went 4-for-12 with a double and an RBI; he would make it to the majors starting in April 1982. The Baseball Hall of Fame possesses other artifacts of the game, including the official scorecard.

A total of 27 future and former major leaguers played in the game.

- From Pawtucket:
  - Seven Pawtucket players had already made their major league debuts, and were back in the minors at the time of the game, but would return to the major leagues:
    - Chico Walker played 11 seasons in the majors between 1980 and 1993 with the Boston Red Sox, Chicago Cubs, California Angels, and New York Mets.
    - Bob Ojeda, the winner of the game after pitching a scoreless 33rd inning, would pitch for 15 major league seasons (1980–1994), most notably for the Mets (going 18–5 in 1986 to help the team win the World Series that year), Red Sox, and Los Angeles Dodgers. While many of Pawtucket's players would play key roles in the 1986 World Series as members of the Red Sox, Ojeda would go on to play for their opponent, the Mets. He then became the lone survivor in a boat crash that claimed the lives of two other pitchers in spring training before Ojeda's first season with the Cleveland Indians.
    - Bruce Hurst pitched for 15 seasons in the majors (1980–1994) for the Red Sox and San Diego Padres. His career record was 145–113, a .562 winning percentage. He was inducted into the Boston Red Sox Hall of Fame in November 2004.
    - Manny Sarmiento pitched in 228 major league games for the Cincinnati Reds, Seattle Mariners, and Pittsburgh Pirates between 1976 and 1983.
    - Rich Gedman caught for the Red Sox for most of his 13-year major league career (1980–1992). He was inducted into the Boston Red Sox Hall of Fame as part of the Class of 2020.
    - Luis Aponte made 110 pitching appearances as a reliever with the Red Sox and Indians from 1980 to 1984. He was inducted into the Venezuelan Baseball Hall of Fame in 2010.
    - Julio Valdez played 65 games with the Red Sox during 1980–1983, mostly serving as a shortstop and second baseman.
  - Four other Pawtucket players had yet to debut in the majors:
    - Wade Boggs spent 18 seasons in Major League Baseball. In addition to his Baseball Hall of Fame induction, he became the 23rd player to reach 3,000 career hits, 8 months before Ripken accomplished the same feat.
    - Marty Barrett played ten major league seasons (1982–1991) at second base for the Red Sox and Padres, hitting .278 for his career. He was inducted into the Boston Red Sox Hall of Fame as part of the Class of 2012.
    - Mike Smithson started 204 games for the Texas Rangers, Minnesota Twins, and Red Sox from 1982 to 1989.
    - Roger LaFrancois appeared in eight games for the Red Sox in 1982.
  - One Pawtucket player had completed his major league career by the time of this game:
    - Win Remmerswaal pitched for the Red Sox in 1979 and 1980. 1981 was his last year in American baseball; he later played for five years in Italy.
- From Rochester:
  - Four Rochester players had already made their major league debuts, and were back in the minors at the time of the game, but would return to the major leagues:
    - Floyd Rayford played third base and catcher for eight years (1980–1987) with the Baltimore Orioles and the St. Louis Cardinals. His best year was 1985, when he hit .306 with 18 home runs and 48 RBI.
    - Mark Corey played in 59 games in his three years as an Oriole outfielder, 1979–1981.
    - Bobby Bonner played for four years (1980–1983) as a middle infielder with the Orioles.
    - Steve Luebber pitched for the Twins in 1971, 1972 and 1976. He also appeared briefly with the Toronto Blue Jays in 1979, and pitched for the Orioles in May, June and September 1981.
  - Four other Rochester players had yet to debut in the majors:
    - Cal Ripken Jr. played 21 seasons in Major League Baseball (MLB) for the Baltimore Orioles (1981–2001). In addition to his Baseball Hall of Fame induction, he became the 24th player to reach 3,000 player hits, 8 months after Boggs accomplished the same feat. He also holds the MLB record for consecutive games played, at 2,632.
    - Dallas Williams would be promoted to the Orioles later in 1981, playing two games, and also appeared in 18 games for Cincinnati in 1983.
    - Dave Huppert reached the major leagues as a catcher with the Orioles in 1983 and again with the Milwaukee Brewers in 1985. He appeared in a total of 15 games.
    - Cliff Speck went on to pitch for the Atlanta Braves in 1986, appearing in 13 games, including one start.
  - Seven Rochester players had completed their major league careers by the time of this game:
    - John Hale played from 1974 to 1979 for the Dodgers and Mariners.
    - Drungo Hazewood appeared in six games for the Orioles as an outfielder in 1980.
    - Mike Hart appeared as an outfielder in 5 games for the Texas Rangers in 1980.
    - Chris Bourjos appeared in 13 games as an outfielder for the 1980 San Francisco Giants.
    - Ed Putman appeared as a catcher in 43 major league games between 1976 and 1979, with the Cubs and the Detroit Tigers.
    - Jim Umbarger appeared in 133 games as a pitcher for the Rangers and Oakland Athletics between 1975 and 1978. He pitched in the minors until 1983.
    - Steve Grilli's major league career was already over by the time he pitched in (and lost) this game. Grilli pitched in 69 games for the Tigers from 1975 to 1977, and one game with the Blue Jays in 1979. Grilli, the father of Jason Grilli, retired from baseball at the end of the 1981 season.

== See also ==
- 100 Inning Game – Longest amateur baseball game ever played (charitable event)
- Extra innings#Longest games – Other long games including the longest major league games
