= Cliff Speck =

American baseball player (born 1956)

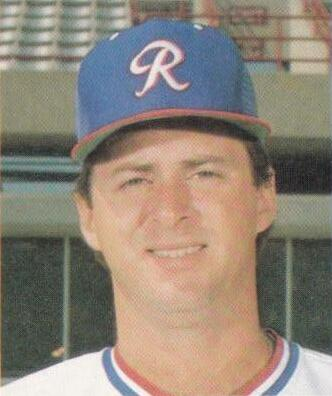
- Speck with the Richmond Braves c. 1987
- Pitcher
- Born: August 8, 1956 (age 69); Portland, Oregon, U.S.
- Batted: Right Threw: Right

MLB debut
- July 30, 1986, for the Atlanta Braves

Last appearance
- September 25, 1986, for the Atlanta Braves

MLB statistics
- Win–loss record: 2–1
- Earned run average: 4.13
- Strikeouts: 21
- Stats at Baseball Reference

Teams
- Atlanta Braves (1986)

Robert Clifford Speck (born August 8, 1956) is an American former pitcher in Major League Baseball who played for the Atlanta Braves in its 1986 season. Listed at 6' 4", 195 lb., Speck batted and threw right handed. He was born in Portland, Oregon.

The New York Mets selected Speck as their 17th pick in the first round of the 1974 MLB draft. Nevertheless, he had to wait 12 years in the Minor Leagues before making his major league debut with his fifth organization. In his second MLB game, he made his only start and defeated the San Diego Padres at Jack Murphy Stadium.

Speck posted a 2-1 record with a 4.13 earned run average in 13 pitching appearances (one start), striking out 21 batters while walking 15 in 28 1/3 innings of work for the Braves.

In addition, Speck went 90-104 with a 4.30 ERA in 377 minor league games from 1974–1988. Highlights of his minor league career included pitching in the longest game in the history of professional baseball, a 33 inning affair between Speck's Rochester Red Wings and the Pawtucket Red Sox. Speck was summoned to replace Steve Grilli with the bases loaded and no out, but he failed, allowing an RBI-single to Dave Koza in a 2-2 count which gave Pawtucket a 3–2 victory.
