= Laribee =

Laribee may refer to:

- Laribee, California, former name of Larabee, California
- Russ Laribee (born 1956), American baseball player
