= Dave Huppert =

American baseball player and manager (born 1957)

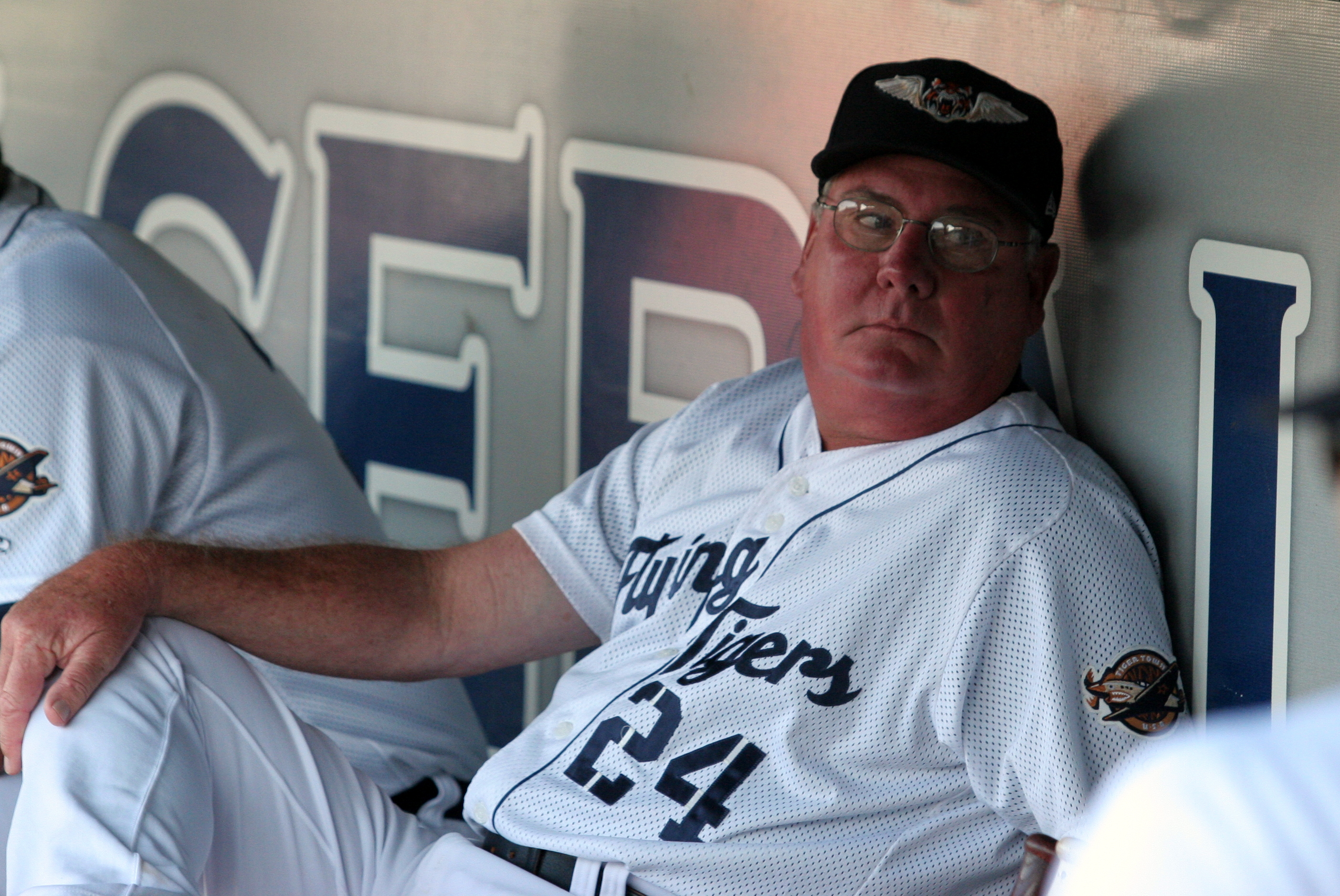
- Huppert with the Lakeland Flying Tigers in 2012
- Catcher
- Born: April 17, 1957 (age 68); South Gate, California, U.S.
- Batted: Right Threw: Right

MLB debut
- September 15, 1983, for the Baltimore Orioles

Last MLB appearance
- October 6, 1985, for the Milwaukee Brewers

MLB statistics
- Batting average: .048
- Home runs: 0
- Runs batted in: 0
- Stats at Baseball Reference

Teams
- As player: Baltimore Orioles (1983); Milwaukee Brewers (1985); As coach: Washington Nationals (2005); Philadelphia Phillies (2008)

David Blain Huppert (born April 17, 1957) is an American former professional baseball catcher in Major League Baseball (MLB) and former manager of the Lakeland Flying Tigers of Minor League Baseball's Florida State League (FSL) in the Detroit Tigers organization.

== Playing career ==
Huppert was originally signed as a player by the Baltimore Orioles in 1977. He caught 31 of 33 innings on April 18, 1981, for the Rochester Red Wings against the Pawtucket Red Sox in the longest game in professional baseball history.

Huppert reached the major leagues as a catcher with the Orioles in 1983 and again with the Milwaukee Brewers in 1985. He appeared in a total of 15 games, he collected one hit—a single against Joe Niekro.

== Managerial career ==
Huppert began his managerial career with the Helena Gold Sox in 1986 at the age of 29. He went on to work in the farm systems of the Milwaukee Brewers (1986–91), Chicago White Sox (1993–98), Florida Marlins (1999–2001), Montreal Expos (2002–04), Philadelphia Phillies (2006–10) and Detroit Tigers (since 2011).

For the Expos, he was the manager of the Double-A Harrisburg Senators for one year (2002), and the Triple-A Edmonton Trappers for two years (2003–04). He worked alongside the legendary Frank Robinson as third base coach for the Washington Nationals during that team's inaugural season in 2005, after its transfer from Montreal.

Huppert moved to the Phillies' organization in 2006. He replaced Steve Smith as Philadelphia's third-base coach during Smith's two-game suspension in September 2008.

In December 2010, Huppert was hired to manage the Lakeland Flying Tigers. Huppert spent the next six seasons managing the Flying Tigers, 2016 was his final season in this role.

Though 2016 and 28 seasons as a minor-league skipper, Huppert posted a managerial record of 1,909–1,831 (.510). He recorded winning records 15 times in those 28 seasons, earning playoff berths 12 times. Huppert managed teams to league titles four times: the 2001 Florida State League (Advanced-A) co-champion Brevard County Manatees, the 2006 South Atlantic League (Low-A) champion Lakewood BlueClaws, the 2007 Florida State League champion Clearwater Threshers and the 2012 Florida State League champion Lakeland Flying Tigers.

Huppert was named Manager of the Year in 1988 with the Stockton Ports in the California League and in 2001 with Brevard County.
