= Dallas Williams =

American baseball player (born 1958)

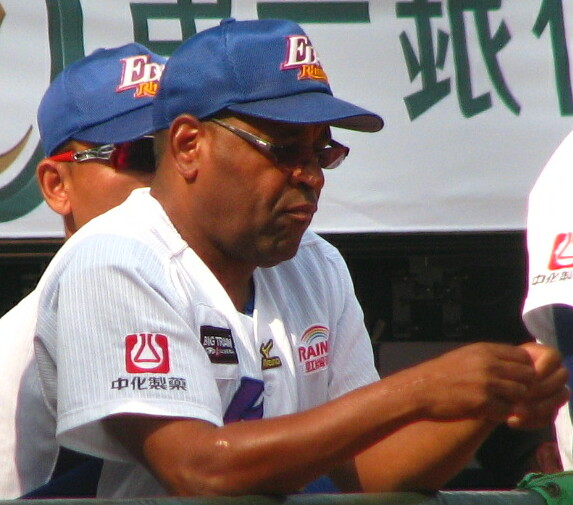
- Williams with the EDA Rhinos at the 2013 Asia Series

Piratas de Campeche
- Outfielder
- Born: February 28, 1958 (age 68); Brooklyn, New York, U.S.
- Batted: Left Threw: Left

MLB debut
- September 19, 1981, for the Baltimore Orioles

Last MLB appearance
- October 2, 1983, for the Cincinnati Reds

MLB statistics
- Batting average: .079
- Home runs: 0
- Runs batted in: 1

NPB statistics
- Batting average: .242
- Home runs: 10
- Runs batted in: 30
- Stats at Baseball Reference

Teams
- Baltimore Orioles (1981); Cincinnati Reds (1983); Hankyu Braves (1988)

Dallas McKinley Williams (born February 28, 1958) is an American former professional baseball outfielder who currently serves as the hitting coach for the Piratas de Campeche of the Mexican League. He played parts of two seasons in Major League Baseball (MLB) with the Baltimore Orioles and Cincinnati Reds, and one season in Nippon Professional Baseball (NPB) for the Hankyu Braves. Since 1989, he has been a baseball coach at various minor league levels, including serving as first base coach for the Colorado Rockies and Boston Red Sox.

== Playing career ==
Williams was selected by the Orioles with the 20th pick in the first round of the 1976 Major League Baseball draft. He played for several years in their minor league system, but only had one brief cup of coffee at the major league level in 1981, when he went 1-for-2 in 2 games. Earlier in 1981, Williams played in the longest game in professional baseball history, Rochester's 3-2 33-inning loss at Pawtucket. Williams went 0-for-13 in the game. Williams' 0-13 line is also a record in futility in any single professional baseball game.

The following spring, the Orioles traded Williams to the Reds along with another minor leaguer in exchange for catcher Joe Nolan. Williams got a slightly more extended shot with Cincinnati, playing in 18 games in September 1983, but he managed just 2 hits in 36 at bats. The following spring, Williams was traded to the Detroit Tigers, and from there he bounced around the minors for several more years. Following a season in Japan for the Hankyu Braves, Williams retired at the end of the 1988 season.

== Coaching career ==
In 1989, Williams' coaching career began with the Kinston Indians. He spent the next several years as a roving minor league instructor for the Cleveland Indians and Chicago White Sox organizations, then returned to coaching at various minor league levels. In 2000, Williams secured his first coaching job at the major league level, serving as first base coach for the Rockies for three seasons. After spending 2003 as first base coach for the Boston Red Sox, Williams once again returned to coaching in the minors. He served as third base coach for the Gary SouthShore RailCats of the Northern League in 2010, but stepped down prior to the 2011 season. He is always a welcomed guest instructor at the New York Baseball Academy. Williams' was hired as the hitting coach for the EDA Rhinos 2013-2015 and picked up a new contract with the Brother Elephants in 2016, also of the Chinese Professional Baseball League.

On March 18, 2022, the Saraperos de Saltillo of the Mexican League hired Williams to serve as their hitting coach.

On February 1, 2024, Williams was added to the coaching staff for the Diablos Rojos del México of the Mexican League. He was fired by the team on November 26, 2025.

On December 8, 2025, Williams was hired to serve as the hitting coach for the Piratas de Campeche of the Mexican League.

Preceded by Tommy Harper	Boston Red Sox First-Base Coach; 2003	Succeeded by Lynn Jones
