= Ted Sizemore =

American baseball player (born 1945)

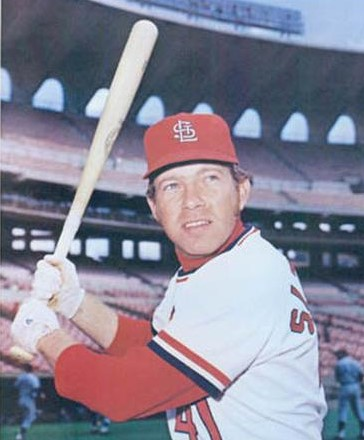
- Second baseman
- Born: April 15, 1945 (age 81); Gadsden, Alabama, U.S.
- Batted: Right Threw: Right

MLB debut
- April 7, 1969, for the Los Angeles Dodgers

Last MLB appearance
- May 27, 1980, for the Boston Red Sox

MLB statistics
- Batting average: .262
- Home runs: 23
- Runs batted in: 430
- Stats at Baseball Reference

Teams
- Los Angeles Dodgers (1969–1970); St. Louis Cardinals (1971–1975); Los Angeles Dodgers (1976); Philadelphia Phillies (1977–1978); Chicago Cubs (1979); Boston Red Sox (1979–1980)

Career highlights and awards
- NL Rookie of the Year (1969)

Ted Crawford Sizemore (born April 15, 1945) is an American former professional baseball player. He played in Major League Baseball as a second baseman from 1969 to 1980 for the Los Angeles Dodgers, St. Louis Cardinals, Philadelphia Phillies, Chicago Cubs, and Boston Red Sox. After winning the National League's Rookie of the Year Award in 1969, his promising career was restricted by numerous injuries. After his playing career, Sizemore worked for Rawlings Sporting Goods.

== Early life ==
Sizemore was born in Gadsden, Alabama, but moved to Detroit, at the age of two years. As a catcher for Pershing High School's baseball team, he earned All-city honors three times. He also earned All-city honors playing fullback in football and guard in basketball twice each. He was high school teammates with Basketball Hall of Famer Mel Daniels playing under coach Will Robinson.

== College career ==
At the University of Michigan at Ann Arbor, he was a varsity letterman from 1964 to 1966, and received All-Big Ten honors in 1965 and 1966. In 1966, he batted .321 to receive District All-America honors. In 1982, the university created the "Ted Sizemore Award" to honor the school's top defensive player each season.

== Baseball career ==
The Los Angeles Dodgers selected Sizemore in the fifteenth round of the 1966 Major League Baseball draft. He served strictly as a catcher his first professional season, but his bat (.330, 4 home runs and 37 RBIs for the Northwest League's Tri-City Atoms) prompted the Dodgers organization to try him more in the outfield in 1967 and 1968. In need of infielders, the Dodgers had Sizemore play second base in the Winter Instructional League in 1968. Following Zoilo Versalles' departure in the 1968 Major League Baseball expansion draft, manager Walter Alston shifted Sizemore over to shortstop at the beginning of Spring training 1969.

=== Los Angeles Dodgers I (1969–1970) ===
Sizemore won the starting shortstop job that spring. Despite a two error performance against the San Francisco Giants, Sizemore proved himself an adequate shortstop. Still, with second baseman Jim Lefebvre not hitting, Sizemore began seeing more time at second by the end of his first month in the majors. With Maury Wills' acquisition on June 11, the move became permanent.

With his bat, Sizemore got off to a hot start in his rookie season, but cooled off in June and July. He picked it up again in the final two months of the season to finish at .271 with four home runs 46 runs batted in and 69 runs scored. He received fourteen of 24 first place votes to be named the National League's Rookie of the Year.

Sizemore got off to a slow start in 1970. He was batting .257 with one home run, twelve RBIs and fourteen runs scored when he ruptured his thigh muscle on June 11 against the St. Louis Cardinals. He returned in late July, and his hitting actually improved. He batted .342 to bring his season average to .306 until a sprained wrist ended his season. That winter, he and minor league catcher Bob Stinson (wrong Bob Stinson link) were traded to the Cardinals for slugging first baseman Dick Allen.

=== St. Louis Cardinals (1971–1975) ===
He began his tenure with the Cardinals splitting time between shortstop and second base, but as the 1971 season wore on, he began taking more and more playing time away from veteran Julián Javier at second. He batted .264 each of his first two seasons in St. Louis. His finest season came in 1973, when he put up career highs in batting (.282), RBIs (54) and runs (69, tying the career high he set his rookie season), while leading the National League in Sacrifice Hits with 25. In 1974, Sizemore usually batted second behind Hall of Famer Lou Brock. Brock set a record with 118 stolen bases that season, and credited Sizemore's patience at the plate batting behind him as a big factor.

Perhaps his most dramatic moment with the Cards came in an extra innings affair with the New York Mets on August 7, 1972. Leading off the bottom of the thirteenth inning, Sizemore hit a walk-off inside-the-park home run off Tug McGraw. The low point of his Cardinals career also came against the Mets. On April 17, 1975, Sizemore tied a record for major league second basemen with three errors in an inning.

=== Los Angeles Dodgers II (1976) ===
On March 2, 1976, Sizemore returned to the Dodgers in exchange for outfielder Willie Crawford. He was acquired for his versatility, and in the event that a proposed deal sending shortstop Bill Russell to the Cardinals for outfielder Reggie Smith ever materialized (in which case, second baseman Davey Lopes would move to short, and Sizemore would inherit the second base job).

A deal for Smith would not be worked out until June 15, after the season started, and the Cardinals settled for minor league infielder Fred Tisdale in the package for Smith, instead. However, a pulled rib muscle by Lopes in Spring training had Sizemore opening the season as the Dodgers' starting second baseman regardless.

=== Catching debut ===
As the game with the Houston Astros went into its tenth inning on August 2, Alston moved Sizemore from second base to catcher for the first time in his major league career. He handled Elias Sosa for two innings without incident. This was followed by a complete game behind the plate on September 19 against the Atlanta Braves. Aside from a wild pitch in the fourth, he handled Tommy John perfectly, as they held the Braves to one run and six hits. The final out of the game was a pop up by Pat Rockett caught by Sizemore in foul territory.

=== Philadelphia Phillies (1977–1978) ===
The National League East champion Philadelphia Phillies were in dire need of a second baseman following All-Star Dave Cash's departure via free agency. At the 1976 Winter meetings, they swung a deal for Sizemore for back-up catcher Johnny Oates.

Batting eighth in the Phillies line-up in 1977, Sizemore was relied upon more for his glove than his bat with his new club. He turned a league leading 104 double plays, while also grounding into a league-leading 25, tying the Phillies single-season record set by Del Ennis in 1950.

He reached the post-season for the first time in his career, as the Phillies duplicated their 101-61 record from the previous season to face Sizemore's former team, the Dodgers, in the 1977 National League Championship Series. With the Phillies leading 5-3 in the ninth inning of game three, Sizemore committed an error on a throw from left fielder Greg Luzinski that opened the door for the Dodgers to score three runs and steal a 6-5 victory. It was Sizemore's second error of the series, won by the Dodgers in four games.

On April 28, 1978, Sizemore broke his hand on a play at second base with the San Diego Padres' Gene Richards. The injury sidelined Sizemore until the end of June, and likely played a part in the career low .219 batting average he put up that year. Regardless, the Phillies repeated as division champions, and Sizemore provided the Phillies with one of the few bright spots in their line-up in the 1978 National League Championship Series. The Dodgers once again defeated the Phillies in four games, however, Sizemore batted .385 with a triple, an RBI and three runs scored.

=== Chicago Cubs (1979) ===
Just as pitchers and catchers were reporting to spring training in 1979, Sizemore went to the Chicago Cubs in a trade. He, Barry Foote, Jerry Martin and minor leaguers Derek Botelho and Henry Mack went to the Cubs for Greg Gross, Dave Rader and Manny Trillo.

=== Boston Red Sox (1979–1980) ===
Toward the end of his only season in Chicago, he was dealt to the Boston Red Sox for a player to be named later when Bosox starting second baseman Jerry Remy and his back-up, Jack Brohamer, were both sidelined with injuries. In his first game in the American League, he went three-for-three with a double, two RBIs and a run scored. The Red Sox also used him twice at catcher shortly after his acquisition.

Sizemore won a reserve job with the Sox out of Spring training 1980, but with the emergence of rookie Dave Stapleton at second base, saw very little action. The Red Sox explored the possibility of selling the veteran to another club, but found no takers, and released him on May 30.

== Personal life ==
After Sizemore's retirement as a player, he went to work for baseball glove manufacturer Rawlings, as their chief liaison with major league players.

Sizemore is the CEO of the Baseball Assistance Team, a 501(c)(3) non-profit organization dedicated to helping former Major League, Minor League, and Negro league players, as well as scouts, umpires, and office personnel, through financial and medical hardships.

== Career stats ==
Games	PA	AB	Runs	Hits	2B	3B	HR	RBI	SB	BB	SO	Avg.	OBP	Fld%
1411	5648	5011	577	1311	188	21	23	430	59	469	350	.262	.325	.977

Sizemore was part of a core of young Dodgers prospects that became known as "The Mod Squad" after the popular TV series of the same name, and appeared on the cover of the May 19, 1969 edition of Sports Illustrated, along with his fellow Mod Squad members.
