= Jason Grilli =

American baseball player (born 1976)

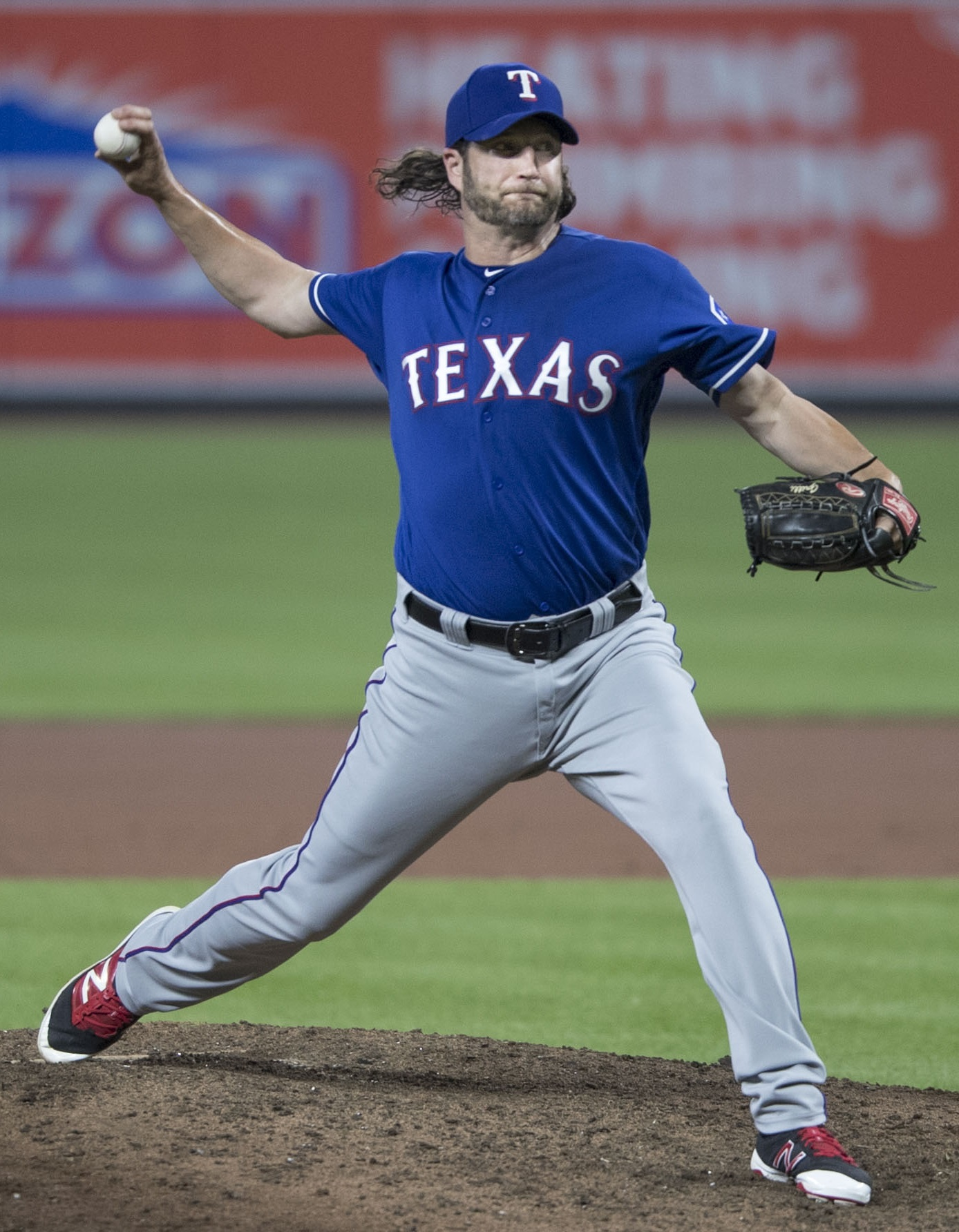
- Grilli with the Texas Rangers in 2017
- Pitcher
- Born: November 11, 1976 (age 49); Royal Oak, Michigan, U.S.
- Batted: Right Threw: Right

MLB debut
- May 11, 2000, for the Florida Marlins

Last MLB appearance
- October 1, 2017, for the Texas Rangers

MLB statistics
- Win–loss record: 34–47
- Earned run average: 4.22
- Strikeouts: 694
- Saves: 79
- Stats at Baseball Reference

Teams
- Florida Marlins (2000–2001); Chicago White Sox (2004); Detroit Tigers (2005–2008); Colorado Rockies (2008–2009); Texas Rangers (2009); Pittsburgh Pirates (2011–2014); Los Angeles Angels of Anaheim (2014); Atlanta Braves (2015–2016); Toronto Blue Jays (2016–2017); Texas Rangers (2017)

Career highlights and awards
- All-Star (2013)

Jason Michael Grilli (born November 11, 1976) is an American former professional baseball pitcher. He played in Major League Baseball (MLB) for the Florida Marlins, Chicago White Sox, Detroit Tigers, Colorado Rockies, Pittsburgh Pirates, Los Angeles Angels of Anaheim, Atlanta Braves, Toronto Blue Jays, and Texas Rangers. Taken as the fourth overall selection of the 1997 MLB draft by the San Francisco Giants, Grilli was one of the top starting pitcher prospects in all of Minor League Baseball, ranked 54th in 1998 and 44th in 1999. The Giants traded him to the Florida Marlins in 1999, for whom he debuted on May 11, 2000.

In 2011, Grilli's career took off as a relief pitcher with the Pittsburgh Pirates. That year, he carried a 2.48 earned run average (ERA) and 10.2 strikeouts per nine innings (K/9) rate in 32 innings pitched (IP), and further improved in 2012, when his strikeout rate climbed to 13.8. In 2013, Grilli made his first All-Star team and became Pittsburgh's closer at the age of 36. From 2011 to 2014, he compiled a 3.09 ERA with 11.9 K/9, 3.3 BB/9 and a 34.2 percent ground-ball rate in 195 1/3 IP.

== Amateur career ==
Although born in Michigan, Grilli moved to Central New York when his father, Steve, played for the Syracuse Chiefs beginning in 1978. Following Grilli's high school career at Charles W. Baker High School in Baldwinsville, New York, he was drafted in the 24th round of the 1994 Major League Baseball draft by the New York Yankees, but he chose not to sign. Instead, he opted to play college baseball at Seton Hall University, which he attended from 1995 to 1997.

In his junior year, Grilli struck out 18 batters in a game to break Charles Nagy's Big East Conference record. He pitched to a 6–4 win–loss record and a 4.65 earned run average (ERA) with 125 strikeouts in 81 1/3 innings pitched. In 1995, he played collegiate summer baseball with the Cotuit Kettleers of the Cape Cod Baseball League, and returned to the league in 1996 to play for the Brewster Whitecaps.

== Professional career ==
The San Francisco Giants selected Grilli in the first round, fourth overall, of the 1997 Major League Baseball draft.

=== Minor leagues ===
Grilli earned high reviews from scouts before the draft, who noted his good delivery, size and bloodlines. Milwaukee Brewers scout Russ Bove wrote that Grilli reminded him of Jim Palmer. As a high draft pick, Grilli was immediately considered to be a top prospect. Baseball America ranked him as the No. 54 prospect in 1998 and the No. 44 prospect in 1999.

Grilli began his professional career in 1998 with the Double-A Shreveport Captains of the Texas League and the Triple-A Fresno Grizzlies of the Pacific Coast League. In 21 games for the Captains, Grilli went 7–10 with a 3.79 ERA with 100 strikeouts in 123 1/3 innings pitched. With the Grizzlies Grilli went 2–3 with a 5.14 ERA in eight games, all starts.

Grilli was named a Texas League All-Star for the 1998 season.

=== Florida Marlins ===
On July 25, 1999, the Giants traded Grilli and Nate Bump to the Florida Marlins to acquire Liván Hernández.

Grilli made his major-league debut on May 11, 2000.

Grilli missed the entire 2002 minor-league season following Tommy John surgery on his pitching elbow. He returned in 2003, pitching most of the season with the AAA Albuquerque Isotopes.

=== Chicago White Sox ===
Grilli was drafted by the Chicago White Sox in the 2003 Rule 5 draft. He had previously been heavily scouted as an amateur by White Sox scout Doug Laumann. He spent 2004 in the White Sox organization after being selected. In January 2005, after the White Sox signed Tadahito Iguchi, Grilli was designated for assignment and eventually released.

=== Detroit Tigers ===
In 2005, Grilli signed a minor league contract with the Detroit Tigers. Tigers scouts and GM Dave Dombrowski were familiar with his abilities, having previously traded for him while running the Marlins in 1999. After helping the Triple-A affiliate Toledo Mud Hens to the International League Championship (he clinched the deciding game), Grilli joined the parent club for a brief late-season audition.

Grilli pitched for Team Italy in the 2006 World Baseball Classic. He also had a good spring training and earned a spot in the Tigers bullpen as a long reliever, leading to his first extended stint in the majors. During the 2006 season, Grilli went 2–3 with a 4.21 ERA. He helped the Tigers to the 2006 World Series where they lost to the St. Louis Cardinals.

In 2007, Grilli posted career highs in almost every category, including games (57), innings (79 2/3), strikeouts (62), wins (5), and holds (11). However, Grilli heard boos at Comerica Park during the season, mostly due to his home ERA of 7.96. He was much more effective away from home, posting a 1.91 ERA in road games. Tigers manager Jim Leyland defended Grilli: "I like Grilli because he's got a resilient arm. ... There's a lot to be said for that."

It was during his time with the Tigers that Grilli decided to abandon his big-breaking curveball in favor of a slider. The move coincided with a transition from starting games in the minor leagues to relief pitching in the major leagues. Tigers teammate Jeremy Bonderman, known for throwing a very effective slider, helped Grilli tweak his grip and delivery. "I knew I could throw a slider because it's just a minor adjustment on how you release the ball", Grilli said."

=== Colorado Rockies ===
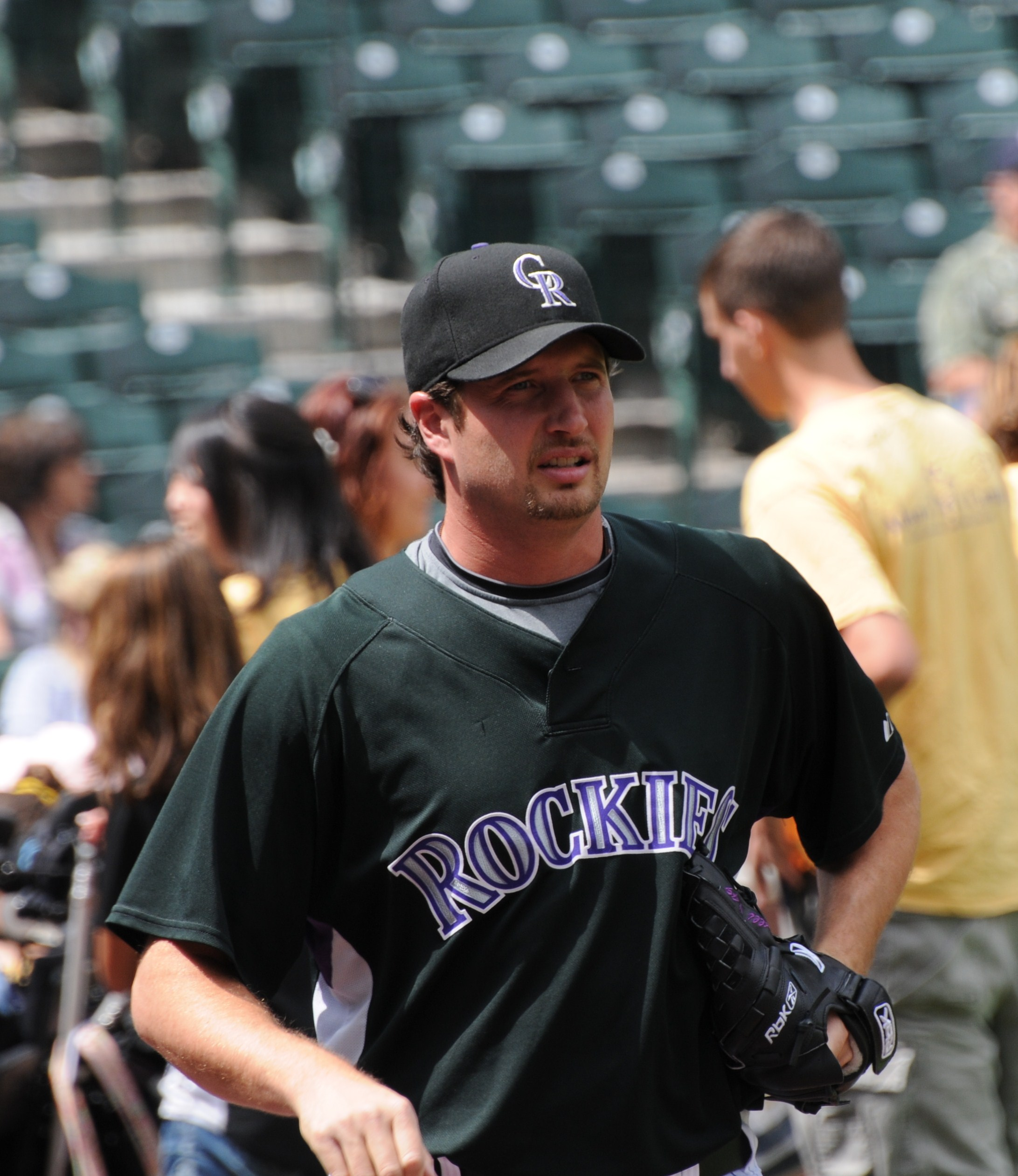
Grilli during his tenure with the Colorado Rockies in 2008.

On April 30, 2008, Grilli was traded to the Colorado Rockies for minor-league relief pitcher Zachary Simons. This move was made to clear a roster spot for incoming reliever Francisco Cruceta.

In January 2009, Grilli announced that he would again pitch for Team Italy in the 2009 World Baseball Classic.

On June 5, 2009, Grilli was designated for assignment by the Rockies.

=== Texas Rangers ===
On June 9, 2009, Grilli was acquired by the Texas Rangers for cash considerations. In October 2009, Grilli was granted free agency.

=== Cleveland Indians ===
On December 2, 2009, Grilli signed a minor-league contract with the Cleveland Indians with an invitation to spring training. Grilli suffered a severe knee injury in spring training while running sprints and would later undergo surgery for a torn quadriceps muscle. The injury and rehabilitation caused him to miss the entire 2010 season. Grilli filed for free agency on November 6, 2010.

=== Philadelphia Phillies ===
On January 30, 2011, Grilli signed a minor-league contract with the Philadelphia Phillies. He pitched for the Triple-A Lehigh Valley IronPigs, posting a 1.93 ERA in 32 1/3 innings, before being released on July 20.

=== Pittsburgh Pirates ===
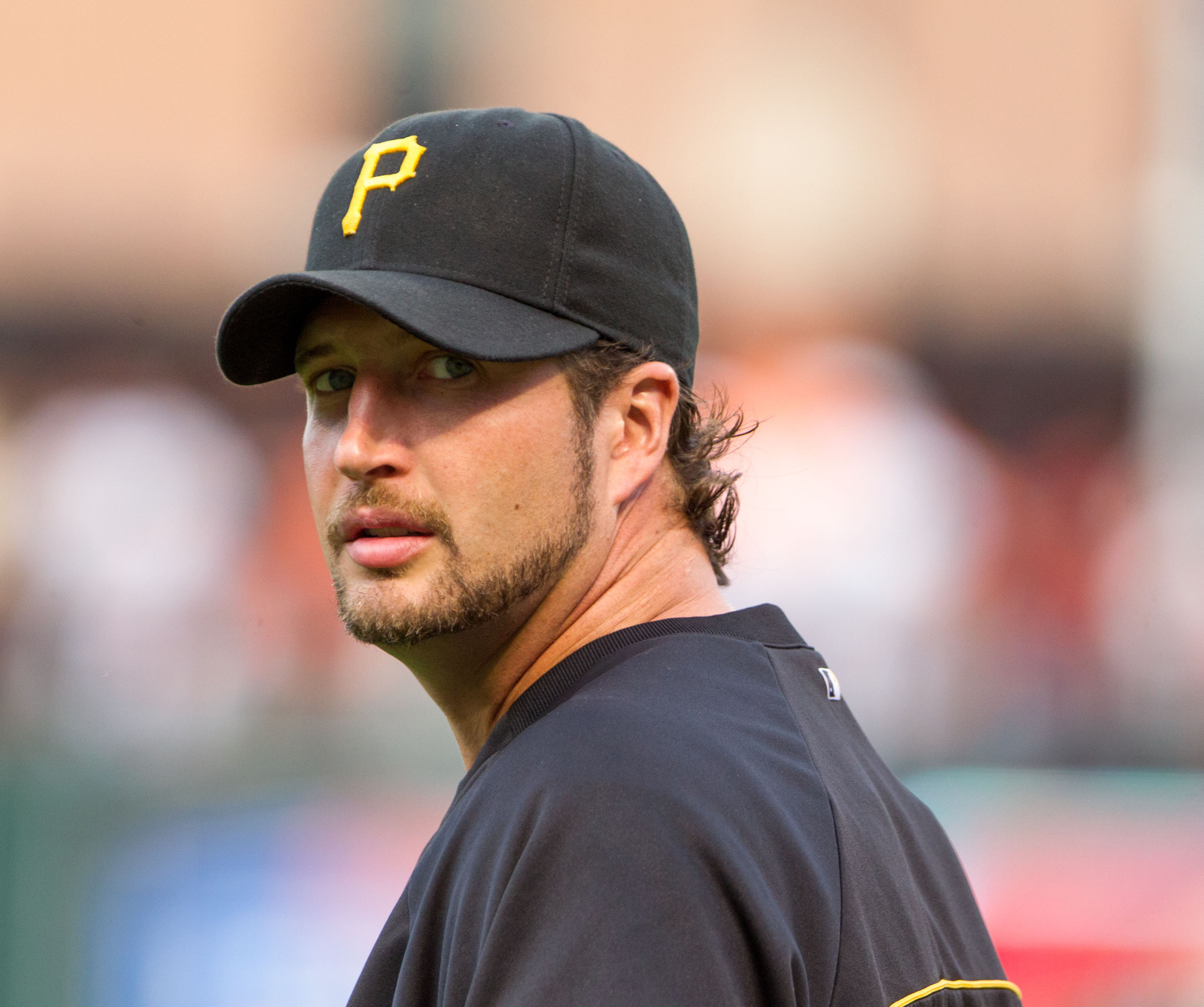
Grilli with the Pittsburgh Pirates

Grilli signed a minor-league contract with the Pittsburgh Pirates on July 21, 2011, and spent the rest of the season on the Pirates major-league roster. The signing reunited Grilli with Pirates manager Clint Hurdle, who had been Grilli's manager with the Rockies several years earlier.

Grilli played in 64 games for the Pirates in the 2012 season, recording a 1–6 record and 2.91 ERA. His 32 holds were second-best in the National League, and his 13.8 strikeouts per nine innings was the fourth-best among NL relievers with 40 or more innings pitched. Grilli's fastball averaged 93.6 mph that season, his top velocity since 2007.

On December 12, 2012, the Pirates announced that they had re-signed Grilli to a two-year contract, the first multi-year deal of his career. Several sportswriters noted that Grilli turned down more lucrative offers from other teams to remain with the Pirates. Just two weeks later, the Pirates made a major trade by sending incumbent closer Joel Hanrahan along with infielder Brock Holt to the Boston Red Sox for infielder Iván DeJesús Jr., relief pitcher Mark Melancon, relief pitcher Stolmy Pimentel and outfielder Jerry Sands. The move opened up the Pirates closer role for the upcoming season, with Grilli as the presumed favorite.

Grilli again pitched for Team Italy in the 2013 World Baseball Classic.

Grilli opened the 2013 season as the Pirates closer. Before 2013, he had accumulated five career saves spanning 10 seasons. After the end of April in the 2013 season, Grilli was named the Delivery Man of the Month. He finished April 2013 with 12 game appearances, a 0.82 ERA and 10 saves in 10 save opportunities through 11 innings of work. Grilli became just the second Pittsburgh Pirates pitcher to save 10 games in the month of April since Mike Williams in 2002. Jason Grilli tied Jim Johnson of the Baltimore Orioles, Sergio Romo of the San Francisco Giants and Mariano Rivera of the New York Yankees for the most saves in the MLB that month. Grilli again was named the Delivery Man of the Month for May 2013.

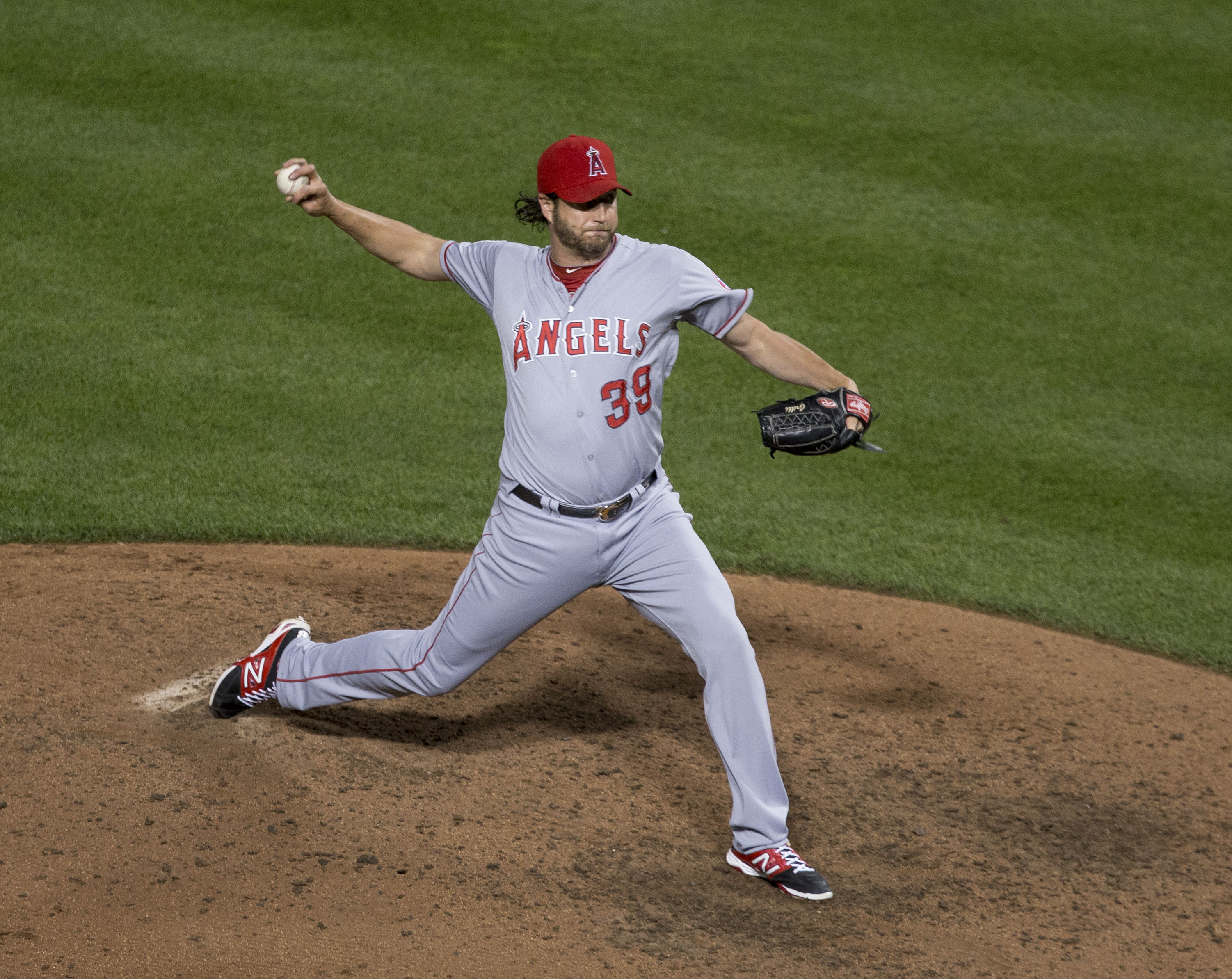
Grilli with the Los Angeles Angels of Anaheim

Grilli was named to the 2013 National League All-Star team, and pitched the ninth inning of the 2013 MLB All-Star Game. After giving up a leadoff triple to Prince Fielder, he retired the next three batters for a scoreless inning. On July 22, Grilli became the first Pirate since 1992 to be on the cover of Sports Illustrated; in that night's game, he injured his forearm and was placed on the 15-day DL, another victim of the magazine's cover jinx. His replacement at the closer position was Mark Melancon. Grilli was activated from the DL on September 3, resuming his role as closer. He helped the Pirates to the 2013 playoffs, the team's first postseason appearance since 1992. Grilli pitched a scoreless ninth inning in the Pirates win over the Cincinnati Reds in the 2013 National League Wild Card Game. He appeared in three games in the Pirates series loss to the St. Louis Cardinals in the 2013 National League Division Series. Grilli has not had a run charged against him in nine career playoff appearances spanning 6 1/3 innings. In his 54 appearances in 2013, Grilli went 0–2 with a 2.70 ERA going 33 for 35 in save opportunities, striking out 74 in 50 innings.

In 2014, Grilli struggled with effectiveness and an oblique muscle injury. He lost the closer role to Melancon.

=== Los Angeles Angels ===
On June 27, 2014, Grilli was traded to the Los Angeles Angels of Anaheim in exchange for relief pitcher Ernesto Frieri. Grilli's performance improved following the trade.

=== Atlanta Braves ===
On December 23, 2014, Grilli signed a two-year contract with the Atlanta Braves. Grilli's original intended role was to serve as Craig Kimbrel's setup man in the eighth inning of games. However, when Kimbrel was traded to the San Diego Padres on the day before opening day of the 2015 season, April 5, Grilli had to assume the closer's role. He had done well, earning 24 saves for the Braves during the first half of the season. On July 11, in a game against the Colorado Rockies, Grilli was covering first base on a ground ball when he tripped and ruptured his left Achilles, causing him to miss the rest of the season.

=== Toronto Blue Jays ===
On May 31, 2016, the Braves traded Grilli to the Toronto Blue Jays for Sean Ratcliffe. Grilli earned his first save as a Blue Jay on June 12, closing out a 10–9 win over the Baltimore Orioles. On July 2, he recorded his first win as a Blue Jay in a 9–6 victory over the Cleveland Indians. In 42 regular season innings with the Blue Jays, Grilli posted a 6–4 record, 3.64 ERA, and 58 strikeouts. He made five appearances in the postseason, and allowed one hit in 3 2/3 total innings. On November 5, 2016, the Blue Jays picked up Grilli's $3 million option for the 2017 season. In a June 3, 2017, game against the New York Yankees, Grilli gave up four home runs in a single inning of relief, becoming the first Blue Jays reliever to do so. On June 27, Grilli was designated for assignment.

=== Return to Texas ===
On July 2, 2017, Grilli was traded to the Texas Rangers for minor league outfielder Eduard Pinto. He became a free agent following the season.

== Personal life ==
Grilli's nickname is Grilled Cheese. He is the son of former major-league pitcher Steve Grilli, who pitched for parts of four seasons in the late 1970s, including three with the Detroit Tigers. Jason was born in the Detroit suburb of Royal Oak after his father's second season with the Tigers. His father is also known for being the losing pitcher for the Rochester Red Wings in the longest professional baseball game on June 23, 1981. Jason wore number 49 during his time with the Tigers in honor of his father, and the two spoke after every game in which Jason appeared.

Grilli and his wife, Danielle Hurt, had their first child in February 2008. Although the Pittsburgh Pirates traded him on June 27, 2014, Grilli and his wife decided to continue living in Pittsburgh all year round. In December that year, they purchased a home for $1.6 million in the suburb of Pine Township. Nearly one year after the trade, Grilli made his first appearance back at PNC Park, as a member of the Atlanta Braves. There he revealed to the Pittsburgh media his intention to continue residing in Pittsburgh.

== See also ==
- List of second-generation Major League Baseball players
