= Roger LaFrancois =

American baseball player (born 1956)

Roger LaFrançois
- Catcher
- Born: August 2, 1956 (age 69); Norwich, Connecticut, U.S.
- Batted: Left Threw: Right

MLB debut
- May 27, 1982, for the Boston Red Sox

Last MLB appearance
- October 3, 1982, for the Boston Red Sox

MLB statistics
- Batting average: .400
- Hits: 4
- RBI: 1
- Stats at Baseball Reference

Teams
- Boston Red Sox (1982)

Roger Victor LaFrançois (born August 2, 1956) is an American former professional baseball player. He played for the Boston Red Sox of the Major League Baseball (MLB) as a catcher in 1982. Listed at 6 feet 2 inches (1.88 m) tall and 215 pounds (98 kg), he batted left-handed and threw right-handed. He spent the entire 1982 season on Boston's MLB roster, but played infrequently as a third-string catcher behind Gary Allenson and Rich Gedman.

== Career ==
LaFrançois attended Eastern Connecticut State University, the University of Connecticut and the University of Oklahoma. In 1975 and 1976, he played collegiate summer baseball with the Orleans Cardinals of the Cape Cod Baseball League (CCBL), and was named a league all-star in 1976. He was selected by the Red Sox in the eighth round of the 1977 MLB draft and spent five seasons in their farm system before his 1982 promotion.

In his eight-game MLB career, LaFrançois was a .400 hitter (4-for-10). His four hits include a double, one RBI, a run scored, and a .500 slugging percentage. He started one game at catcher, the final regular season contest on October 3, 1982, against the New York Yankees at Yankee Stadium. LaFrançois went two-for-five, scoring the decisive run as the Red Sox won, 5–3, in 11 innings.

LaFrançois played two more seasons in the minor leagues before retiring as an active player. Since, he has been a manager in the Montreal Expos' farm system and a batting instructor at the minor-league level for several organizations, as well as for the independent league Worcester Tornadoes. In 1986, he returned to the CCBL as catching and pitching coach for the Harwich Mariners.

As of 2016, LaFrançois was serving as the hitting coach for the State College Spikes of the New York–Penn League, Short Season–A affiliate of the St. Louis Cardinals.
