= Russ Laribee =

American professional baseball player

Russell Kurt Laribee
- Outfielder
- Born: July 30, 1956 (age 70); Southington, Connecticut, U.S.

Russell Kurt Laribee (born July 30, 1956) is an American former professional baseball player.

A native of Southington, Connecticut, Laribee attended Southington High School and the University of Connecticut. In 1976, he played collegiate summer baseball with the Harwich Mariners of the Cape Cod Baseball League, and led the league in triples with five. Laribee was drafted in the 21st round (527th overall) of the 1977 Draft. From 1977 through 1981 he played outfield in the Boston Red Sox minor league system, ascending as high as the team's Triple-A affiliate, the Pawtucket Red Sox. His most productive season came in 1980 with Double-A Bristol Red Sox, when he hit .302 with a .390 on-base percentage and a .508 slugging in 109 games.

Laribee is better known as having the professional single-game strikeout record by fanning seven times in Pawtucket's 33-inning game against the Rochester Red Wings in 1981. Though Laribee is most known for that ignominious distinction, it is rarely remembered that, in the same game, it was his sacrifice fly in the bottom of the 9th inning that tied the game at 1–1, ultimately sending the game into extra innings. Pawtucket won, 3–2, while Laribee went 0-for-11.

In a five-season minor-league career, Laribee posted a combined .264 batting average with 57 home runs in 458 games.

He played a singular season in Italy, leading the Serie A in Home Runs with 17 in 1982.

In 2005, Laribee was inducted into the University of Connecticut at Avery Point Athletic Hall of Fame, as he held single-season records for total bases, runs scored and RBI, along with the career batting average mark before he moved on to the main campus at Storrs.
