= Steve Grilli =

American baseball player (born 1949)

- Pitcher
- Born: May 2, 1949 (age 77); Brooklyn, New York, U.S.
- Batted: Right Threw: Right

MLB debut
- September 19, 1975, for the Detroit Tigers

Last MLB appearance
- September 17, 1979, for the Toronto Blue Jays

MLB statistics
- Win–loss record: 4–3
- Earned run average: 4.51
- Strikeouts: 91
- Stats at Baseball Reference

Teams
- Detroit Tigers (1975–1977); Toronto Blue Jays (1979)

Stephen Joseph Grilli (born May 2, 1949) is an American former professional baseball pitcher, who played in Major League Baseball (MLB) for the Detroit Tigers and Toronto Blue Jays. Grilli played for six seasons in baseball, but only played in the major league for parts of four seasons. After graduating from Gannon University, Grilli was signed as an undrafted amateur free agent by the Tigers in the middle of the 1970 season, although he didn't make his major league debut until five years later at the age of twenty-six on September 19, 1975 as a reliever in a game against the Boston Red Sox at Tiger Stadium in which he pitched three innings and allowed one hit without surrendering a run. Plagued by control problems with his pitches and walking more batters than he struck out, he worked out of the bullpen for the next two years until being purchased by the Blue Jays before the 1978 season.

Wearing uniform number 45, a change from the number 49 he wore in Detroit, Grilli worked as a starter during some seasons and as a closer in others while playing in the Blue Jays organization. Grilli made his final major league appearance on September 17, 1979 in a loss against the Boston Red Sox at Exhibition Stadium in Toronto.

He was traded to the Orioles organization during the 1981 season, and played for their AAA affiliate, the Rochester Red Wings. There, on June 23, 1981, he pitched the 33rd inning of the longest professional baseball game, a game whose first 32 innings were played in April, before he'd even joined the team. He faced three batters and gave up one run without recording an out against the Pawtucket Red Sox, recording the loss.

Grilli retired after the 1981 season at the age of thirty-two, with a 4–3 win–loss record in seventy appearances over four seasons in the majors.

He has a son, Jason, who was a pitcher for ten different major league clubs. Grilli also is the owner of a bar in the city of Syracuse, New York, called "Change of Pace”.
