= Chico Walker =

American baseball player (born 1957)

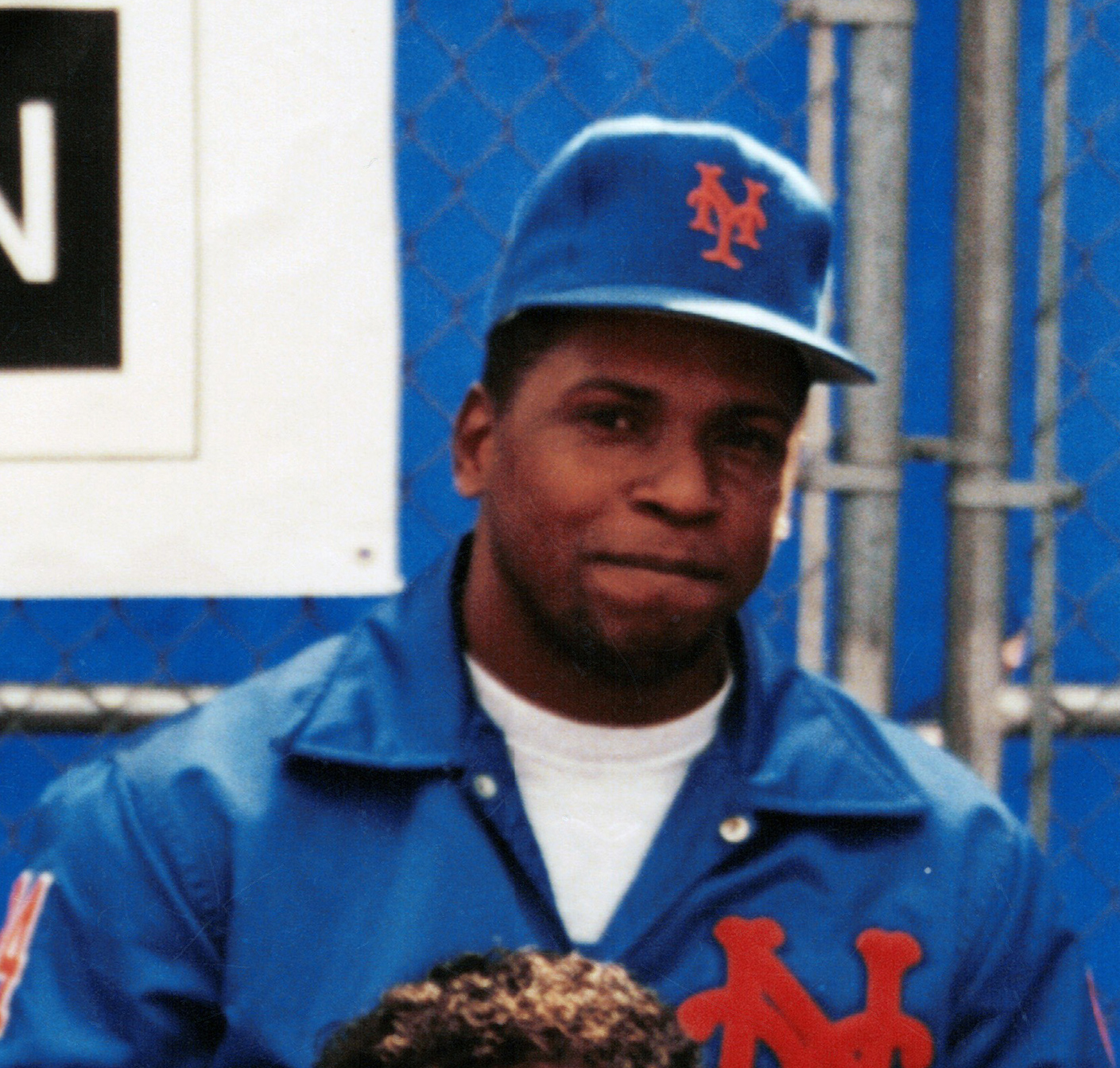
- Walker as a member of the New York Mets in 1992
- Utility player
- Born: November 25, 1957 (age 68); Jackson, Mississippi, U.S.
- Batted: Both Threw: Right

MLB debut
- September 2, 1980, for the Boston Red Sox

Last MLB appearance
- October 3, 1993, for the New York Mets

MLB statistics
- Batting average: .246
- Home runs: 17
- Runs batted in: 116
- Stats at Baseball Reference

Teams
- Boston Red Sox (1980–1981, 1983–1984); Chicago Cubs (1985–1987); California Angels (1988); Chicago Cubs (1991–1992); New York Mets (1992–1993)

Cleotha "Chico" Walker (born November 25, 1957) is an American former professional baseball utility player. He played for four teams in Major League Baseball (MLB) in all or parts of 11 seasons spanning from 1980 to 1993. Listed at 5 feet 9 inches (1.75 m) and 170 pounds (77 kg), he was a switch hitter and threw right-handed.

== Biography ==
Well known for his versatility, Walker, a graduate of Chicago's Tilden High School, played at least 40 games at five different positions in his MLB career, appearing at third base, second base, and all three outfield positions. His most productive season came in 1992, when he posted a combined .289 batting average with 38 RBI in 126 games for the Cubs and Mets, all career numbers. Additionally, Walker spent 19 seasons in Minor League Baseball, compiling a .269 average with 154 home runs and 725 RBI in 1646 games.

Walker also played in Mexico, the Dominican Republic, Venezuela and Puerto Rico, and had a stint as a manager with the Cook County Cheetahs of the Frontier League in 1999.

While playing for Triple-A Pawtucket Red Sox, Walker participated in the longest game in professional baseball history. It lasted for 33 innings spread over two months, with eight hours and 25 minutes of playing time. 32 innings were played on April 18–19, 1981, at McCoy Stadium in Pawtucket, Rhode Island, and the visiting Rochester Red Wings were tied with the Red Sox, 2–2. The 33rd and final inning took place on June 23 and Pawtucket finally won, 3–2.

== Family ties ==
Walker is the uncle of National Basketball Association player Antoine Walker.
