= Sam Bowen (baseball) =

American baseball player (born 1952)

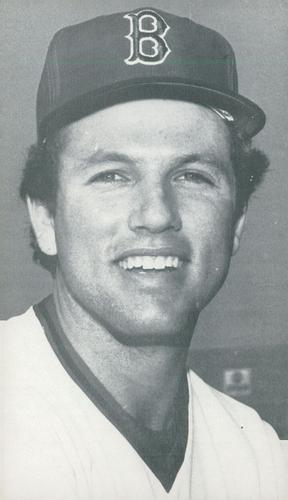
- Outfielder
- Born: September 18, 1952 (age 72); Brunswick, Georgia, U.S.
- Batted: Right Threw: Right

MLB debut
- August 25, 1977, for the Boston Red Sox

Last MLB appearance
- October 4, 1980, for the Boston Red Sox

MLB statistics
- Fielding percentage: 1.000
- Putouts: 21
- Batting Average: .136
- Stats at Baseball Reference

Teams
- Boston Red Sox (1977–1978, 1980)

Samuel Thomas Bowen (born September 18, 1952) is an American former outfielder in Major League Baseball who played between 1977 and 1980 for the Boston Red Sox. He batted and threw right-handed. In a three-season career, Bowen posted a .136 batting average (3-for-22) with one home run, one RBI, three runs, and one stolen base in 16 games played.

== Amateur career ==
With very few opportunities at the major league level, Bowen was not able to fulfill his real potential after a solid career at Valdosta State University. He was drafted four times (Cleveland, Montreal, Atlanta, California) prior to signing with the Boston Red Sox in 1974, and is one of very few players to be drafted five times.

== Professional career ==
He spent three seasons in the Boston minor league system before earning a promotion to the Red Sox in 1977, after hitting .265 with 15 home runs and 49 RBI for Triple-A Pawtucket Red Sox. He started 1978 in Triple-A and was recalled during the midseason to replace departed Bernie Carbo. After that, he led Pawtucket with 28 home runs and 75 RBI in 1979, and played his last professional season in 1982, while dividing his playing time between Pawtucket and Boston.

== Honors ==
Bowen was inducted into the VSU Hall of Fame in 1997 and also in March 2013 was inducted into the Glynn County Hall of Fame in his hometown of Brunswick, Georgia.
