= Garry Hancock =

American baseball player (1954–2015)

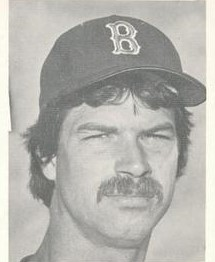
- Outfielder
- Born: January 23, 1954; Tampa, Florida, U.S.
- Died: October 10, 2015 (aged 61); Valrico, Florida, U.S.
- Batted: Left Threw: Left

MLB debut
- July 16, 1978, for the Boston Red Sox

Last MLB appearance
- September 30, 1984, for the Oakland Athletics

MLB statistics
- Batting average: .247
- Home runs: 12
- Runs batted in: 64
- Stats at Baseball Reference

Teams
- Boston Red Sox (1978, 1980–1982); Oakland Athletics (1983–1984)

Ronald Garry Hancock (January 23, 1954 – October 10, 2015) was an American professional baseball player. He played in Major League Baseball (MLB) for the Boston Red Sox and Oakland Athletics in parts of six seasons spanning 1978–1984, primarily as a reserve outfielder. Listed at 6 feet 0 inches (1.83 m) and 175 pounds (79 kg), he batted and threw left-handed.

== Early years ==
Upon graduation from Brandon High School in Brandon, Florida, Hancock was selected by the Texas Rangers in the 22nd round of the 1972 MLB draft, but chose instead to play ball at the University of South Carolina. He was drafted again in the secondary phases of 1973, 1974 and 1975 by the Cleveland Indians, Rangers and California Angels, respectively, but did not sign and remained in school. He finally was signed when the Indians made him the number seventeen overall selection of the 1976 MLB draft's January secondary phase.

== Professional career ==
Hancock batted .302 in two seasons in the Cleveland organization before being dealt to the Red Sox in exchange for Jack Baker following the 1977 season.

After hit a .303 average for the Pawtucket Red Sox through July 1978, Hancock was called up to Boston. He remained with the club for the rest of the season as a fourth outfielder and pinch hitter, batting .225 with four runs batted in and ten runs scored.

Hancock spent all of 1979 at Pawtucket and hit .325 to win the International League batting title. He received his second call up to the majors in June 1980 and remained with the Bosox through 1981. His most productive season for Boston came in 1980, when he hit a slash line of .287/.300/.443 with four home runs and 19 RBI in 46 games.

Hancock then batted .294 with a career-high 21 home runs at Pawtucket in 1982, and was called up to the majors again late in September. In fifteen plate appearances for the Bosox, he had just one walk to show for it. That winter, he was traded by Boston along with third baseman Carney Lansford and a minor leaguer to Oakland for outfielder Tony Armas and catcher Jeff Newman.

Hancock hit .273 with nine homers and 30 RBI in a career-high 101 games for the Athletics in 1983. He hit poorly the following season and was released, then retired from the game.

Hancock was a longtime resident of Valrico, Florida, where he died in 2015 at the age of 61.
