= Julio Valdez =

Dominican baseball player (1956–2022)

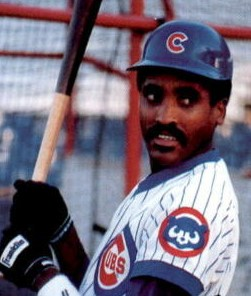
- Shortstop
- Born: June 3, 1956; San Cristóbal, Dominican Republic
- Died: July 23, 2022 (aged 66); Nizao, Dominican Republic
- Batted: Both Threw: Right

MLB debut
- September 2, 1980, for the Boston Red Sox

Last MLB appearance
- April 30, 1983, for the Boston Red Sox

MLB statistics
- Batting average: .207
- Home runs: 1
- Runs batted in: 8
- Stats at Baseball Reference

Teams
- Boston Red Sox (1980–1983)

Julio Julián Castillo Valdez (June 3, 1956 – July 23, 2022) was a Dominican professional baseball infielder and manager. He played in Major League Baseball (MLB) for the Boston Red Sox from 1980 to 1983, and later managed in Minor League Baseball. Listed at 6 feet 2 inches (1.88 m) and 160 pounds (73 kg), he was a switch-hitter and threw right-handed.

== Biography ==
Valdez began his professional baseball career in 1976 with the Winter Haven Red Sox, a farm team of the Boston Red Sox; he reached the Triple-A level in 1979. Valdez went on to play in MLB for parts of four seasons (1980–1983) with Boston, mainly as a shortstop. In 65 MLB games with Red Sox, Valdez hit .207 (18-for-87) with one home run and eight RBIs. In 1981, while with the Triple-A Pawtucket Red Sox, he played in the longest professional baseball game in history, batting 2-for-13 in the 33-inning contest.

On May 6, 1983, Valdez was arrested at Fenway Park by members of the Boston Police Department during a game against the Seattle Mariners. Valdez had not played for the team since the end of April, and was not in uniform when arrested. Charged with statutory rape, it was subsequently reported that the minor involved had lied to Valdez about her age. The charges were dismissed in July of that year, after a grand jury refused to return an indictment.

Following his arrest, Valdez was suspended with pay by the Red Sox and later designated for assignment. He did not play in another major league game. He played in Minor League Baseball for the Red Sox organization though 1984, and then for the Chicago Cubs organization through 1988.

After his playing career, Valdez managed the Dominican Summer League teams for several MLB franchises, including the Cubs, New York Yankees, and Chicago White Sox.

== See also ==
- List of Major League Baseball players from the Dominican Republic
