= Luis Aponte =

Venezuelan baseball player (born 1953)

- Pitcher
- Born: June 14, 1953 (age 73); El Tigre, Venezuela
- Batted: Right Threw: Right

MLB debut
- September 4, 1980, for the Boston Red Sox

Last MLB appearance
- July 6, 1984, for the Cleveland Indians

MLB statistics
- Win–loss record: 9–6
- Earned run average: 3.27
- Strikeouts: 113
- Stats at Baseball Reference

Teams
- Boston Red Sox (1980–1983); Cleveland Indians (1984)

Member of the Venezuelan

Baseball Hall of Fame
- Induction: 2010

Luis Eduardo Aponte Yuripe (born June 14, 1953) is a Venezuelan former professional baseball player.

== Career ==
He played as a right-handed middle relief pitcher in Major League Baseball for the Boston Red Sox and Cleveland Indians. In his career, Aponte compiled a 9–6 record with 113 strikeouts, seven saves, and a 3.27 ERA in 220 innings over 110 appearances.

Aponte committed no errors in his MLB career, handling 60 total chances (23 putouts, 37 assists) perfectly for a 1.000 fielding percentage.

Aponte was signed by Boston as an amateur free agent in 1973. He had his most effective season in 1982, earning three saves in 40 appearances with a 3.18 ERA. He pitched four innings in the longest professional baseball game.

== See also ==
- List of players from Venezuela in Major League Baseball
