= Dave Stapleton (infielder) =

American baseball player (born 1954)

- Infielder
- Born: January 16, 1954 (age 72); Fairhope, Alabama, U.S.
- Batted: Right Threw: Right

MLB debut
- May 30, 1980, for the Boston Red Sox

Last MLB appearance
- October 5, 1986, for the Boston Red Sox

MLB statistics
- Batting average: .271
- Home runs: 41
- Runs batted in: 224
- Stats at Baseball Reference

Teams
- Boston Red Sox (1980–1986)

David Leslie Stapleton (born January 16, 1954) is an American former Major League Baseball player who played for the Boston Red Sox from 1980 to 1986. Stapleton attended Robertsdale High School then the University of South Alabama.

== Professional career ==
Stapleton grew up on a farm in Loxley, Alabama and attended Robertsdale High School where he played football, basketball and baseball. He played Babe Ruth League baseball during the summers where he caught the attention of the baseball coach at Faulkner Junior College.

Stapleton was selected by the Boston Red Sox in the tenth round (231st overall) of the 1975 amateur baseball draft and over the next five years worked his way up the Red Sox minor league system playing for Winter Haven, Bristol, and Pawtucket.

He made his first appearance for the Red Sox on May 30, 1980. During his time with the Red Sox, he primarily served as a utility player, covering first base, second base, shortstop and third base as well as playing in the outfield and serving as designated hitter.

In 1982 and 1983 he served as the team's first baseman, losing the job to Bill Buckner in 1984. From 1984 to 1986, Stapleton only played 82 games for the Red Sox.

During Game 6 of the 1986 World Series, Red Sox manager John McNamara left Buckner in the game rather than replace him with Stapleton for defensive purposes, leading to the Mookie Wilson ground ball that went through Buckner's legs, giving the New York Mets a come-from-behind win in the tenth inning. The Mets went on to win the Series four games to three.

After the 1986 season, Stapleton became a free agent and signed with the Seattle Mariners, but was released on March 31, 1987, prior to the start of the regular season.

In his career, Stapleton batted .271 (550–2028), with 41 home runs, 224 RBI, 238 runs, 118 doubles, eight triple, six stolen bases, a .310 on-base percentage, and 807 total bases for a .398 slugging average.

Stapleton played 7 years in the major leagues (1980–1986) and his batting average decreased every year he played (.321, .285, .264, .247, .231, .227, .128).

In 2026 Stapleton was named the Head Coach for the Angels California Minor league team, The Rancho Cucamonga Quakes.

Preceded by Tony Pérez	Boston Red Sox First Baseman; 1982–1983	Succeeded by Bill Buckner
