= Rich Gedman =

American baseball player (born 1959)

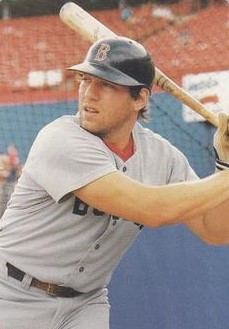
- Gedman with the Boston Red Sox
- Catcher
- Born: September 26, 1959 (age 66); Worcester, Massachusetts, U.S.
- Batted: Left Threw: Right

MLB debut
- September 7, 1980, for the Boston Red Sox

Last MLB appearance
- October 4, 1992, for the St. Louis Cardinals

MLB statistics
- Batting average: .252
- Home runs: 88
- Runs batted in: 382
- Stats at Baseball Reference

Teams
- Boston Red Sox (1980–1990); Houston Astros (1990); St. Louis Cardinals (1991–1992)

Career highlights and awards
- 2× All-Star (1985, 1986); Boston Red Sox Hall of Fame

Richard Leo Gedman (born September 26, 1959) is an American professional baseball hitting adviser with the Boston Red Sox, and a former coach and player. He played in Major League Baseball (MLB) as a catcher for the Red Sox (1980–1990), Houston Astros (1990–1991), and St. Louis Cardinals (1991–1992). Listed at 6 feet 0 inches (1.83 m) and 210 pounds (95 kg), he batted left-handed and threw right-handed.

== Baseball career ==
=== Amateur and minor leagues ===
A native of Worcester, Massachusetts, Gedman played first base and pitched at Saint Peter-Marian High School and for the Grafton Hill (Worcester) American Legion Baseball program. He went undrafted in the 1977 Major League Baseball draft, and was signed as a free agent by the Red Sox. He was sent to the Instructional League to learn to play catcher, and progressed steadily up through the Red Sox minor leagues system. Highlights of his minor league career included catching the first nine innings of the longest game in the history of professional baseball, a 33 inning affair between Gedman's Pawtucket Red Sox and the Rochester Red Wings.

=== Major leagues ===
Gedman made his debut for the Sox at the age of 20 in September 1980, pinch-hitting for Carl Yastrzemski. In 1981, regular Sox catcher Carlton Fisk was granted free-agency and signed with the Chicago White Sox, leaving the catcher position open. Gedman shared catching duties with Gary Allenson, and played well enough to be named The Sporting News Rookie of the Year.

Following a poor 1982, Gedman's hitting improved the next two seasons under the instruction of Red Sox hitting coach Walt Hriniak. He hit a career high 24 home runs in 1984 and followed with career highs in batting average (.295) and RBI (80) in 1985 while throwing out nearly half of potential base stealers. In that season, he became the 16th Red Sox player and only the sixth catcher since 1900 to hit for the cycle.

In 1986, Gedman experienced three highlights of his career. Gedman was the battery-mate to Red Sox pitcher Roger Clemens on April 29 when Clemens struck out 20 batters against the Seattle Mariners to set the major league single-game strikeout record in a nine-inning game. Gedman's 20 putouts set the American League record for putouts in a game by a catcher. On April 30, he had 16 putouts for a total of 36 in two days, which is the most for a catcher in two consecutive games. Gedman was also selected to the All-Star Game that year, to go with his appearance in the 1985 game. But the peak of his career coincided with one of its lows in the 1986 World Series. In the bottom of the tenth inning of Game 6, with the Sox leading by one run with two outs, Kevin Mitchell on third and Mookie Wilson at bat, reliever Bob Stanley threw a pitch that Gedman failed to handle. It was scored as a wild pitch, but many considered it a Gedman passed ball. Mitchell came in to score, tying the game. Then, Wilson hit a ball that went through first baseman Bill Buckner's legs to win the game for the Mets. The Sox went on to lose the deciding game, and the series.

On January 8, 1987, ten free agents (Gedman, Tim Raines, Lance Parrish, Bob Horner, Andre Dawson, Ron Guidry, Bob Boone, Doyle Alexander, Toby Harrah and Gary Roenicke) failed to meet a midnight deadline and thus were not allowed to re-sign with their former clubs until May 1 if they were not offered contracts by new teams. The general lack of interest in the players became the focus of a Players Association anti-collusion lawsuit against the owners.

On November 3, 1986, while practicing for a seven-game series between Major League and Japanese All-Stars, Gedman was struck by a warmup pitch from Detroit Tigers pitcher Willie Hernández, resulting in a fractured cheekbone. This was the beginning of a litany of injuries, holdouts, and inconsistency which contributed to the waning of Gedman's skills, both offensive and defensive. In 1989, Rick Cerone replaced him as the regular Boston catcher. In 1990, he served as back-up catcher to Tony Peña, who was acquired by the Red Sox during the offseason. On June 7, Gedman was traded to Houston for a player to be named later.

Gedman was not re-signed by the Astros, and in 1991 he signed with the Cardinals to back up Tom Pagnozzi. After spending spring training of 1993 with the Oakland Athletics, Gedman signed a minor-league contract with the Yankees, playing the season with their Triple-A club, the Columbus Clippers. When he failed to make a major league roster in 1994, he retired at age 34.

During his career, Gedman batted .252 with 88 home runs, 382 RBI, 331 runs, 176 doubles, 12 triples, and three stolen bases in 1033 games. As a catcher, he compiled a .984 fielding percentage with 5274 putouts, 431 assists and 92 errors in 980 games.

Gedman made the American League All-Star Team twice as a catcher in the 1980s, joining such players as Lance Parrish, Carlton Fisk, Ted Simmons, and Terry Steinbach as the only players to accomplish this.

=== Coaching ===
In 2002, Gedman became a coach with the North Shore Spirit, a team in the independent Northeast League. He was also the Spirit's bench coach. He then managed the Worcester Tornadoes, in the Can-Am League, from 2005 through 2010. The Tornadoes won the Can-Am League title in their first year of existence. In his six years in Worcester, Gedman led the team to a 283–290 record, 10–6 in the postseason.

On January 10, 2011, Gedman returned to organized baseball when he was named hitting coach for the Lowell Spinners, the Red Sox' Class A Short Season affiliate in the New York–Penn League, returning to the Boston organization after a two-decade absence. In 2012, Gedman was promoted to Class A Salem, and switched to Double-A Portland Sea Dogs in 2013. In 2015, he was named hitting coach of the Triple-A Pawtucket Red Sox, and moved with the team when they left Pawtucket for Worcester in 2021. He remained with the Worcester Red Sox as their hitting coach through the 2024 season.

In January 2025, the Red Sox named Gedman as a player development hitting adviser with the Triple-A affiliate Worcester Red Sox.

=== Highlights ===
- Twice named an All-Star (1985–86)
- The Sporting News' AL Rookie of the Year (1981)
- Selected for the All-Star team by UPI and The Sporting News (1985)
- Caught Dennis Eckersley's one-hitter (September 26, 1980)
- Set two AL records for putouts in a game [20] and in consecutive games [36] (April 29–30, 1986)
- Hit for the cycle and drove in seven runs against the Blue Jays (September 18, 1985)
- Reached base in all five at-bats of historic Game 5 of the 1986 American League Championship Series. This included a two-run home run in the second inning and a hit by pitch in the ninth inning that set up Dave Henderson's dramatic two-out home run.

== Personal life ==
Rich Gedman met his future-wife Sherry Aselton in 1977, when both attended St. Peter-Marian High School in Worcester. Sherry went on to play softball and basketball at the University of Connecticut where she threw two no-hitters and as of 2011 still holds the second-lowest career ERA in program history (0.57). The couple married in 1982.

The Gedmans have two sons, Michael and Matthew, and a daughter, Marissa. Michael was a freshman pitcher for the Le Moyne College Dolphins in 2007, but when his younger brother Matthew was accepted as a freshman at UMass in both their baseball and hockey programs (as an infielder and a goalie), sophomore Michael transferred to UMass also. Mike played a mix of first baseman and pitcher, and hit .312 in three seasons for the Minutemen, including .345 as a junior in 2009. Matt played shortstop and third baseman at UMass, and finished his career with a .334 batting average over his four years, and a team-leading .402 average during his senior year in 2011. Matt was drafted by the Boston Red Sox in the 45th round of the 2011 MLB draft; he played in Minor League Baseball for several Red Sox farm teams from 2011 through 2014.

Marissa Gedman attended Noble and Greenough School where she participated in field hockey, ice hockey, and softball. In her 2008 season, she achieved All-League ISL, a NE Championship, and 16-U National Championship in Ice Hockey. She went on to attend Harvard University starting in 2010, and played for the women's ice hockey team, accumulating 75 points with the Harvard Crimson women's ice hockey program. For the 2015–16 season, she was a member of the Boston Pride of the NWHL and participated in the 2016 Outdoor Women's Classic, the first outdoor professional women’s hockey game.

In his spare time during the baseball off-season, Gedman holds catching clinics in central Massachusetts including at The Strike Zone in Worcester, Shrewsbury High School, and Triple Play Batting Cages in Clinton, Massachusetts.

== See also ==
- List of Major League Baseball players to hit for the cycle

Achievements
Preceded by Oddibe McDowell	Hitting for the cycle September 18, 1985	Succeeded by Tony Phillips
