= 1986 Boston Red Sox season =

Major League Baseball season

1986 Boston Red Sox
- American League champions American League East champions
- League: American League
- Division: East
- Ballpark: Fenway Park
- City: Boston, Massachusetts
- Record: 95–66 (.590)
- Divisional place: 1st
- Owners: Buddy LeRoux, Haywood Sullivan, Jean Yawkey
- President: Jean Yawkey
- General manager: Lou Gorman
- Manager: John McNamara
- Television: WSBK-TV, Ch. 38; NESN (Ned Martin, Bob Montgomery)
- Radio: WPLM-FM 99.1; WPLM-AM 1390 (Ken Coleman, Joe Castiglione)
- Stats: ESPN.com; Baseball Reference

The 1986 Boston Red Sox season was the 86th season in the franchise's Major League Baseball history. The Red Sox finished first in the American League East with a record of 95–66. After defeating the California Angels in the ALCS, the Red Sox lost the World Series to the New York Mets in seven games.

== Offseason ==
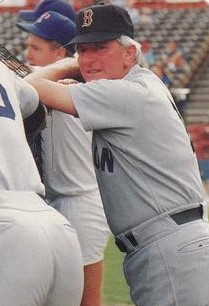
Red Sox manager John McNamara

- November 13, 1985: Bob Ojeda, Tom McCarthy, John Mitchell and Chris Bayer (minors) were traded to the New York Mets for Calvin Schiraldi, Wes Gardner, John Christensen, and La Schelle Tarver.
- December 11, 1985: Mark Clear was traded to the Milwaukee Brewers for Ed Romero.
- January 14, 1986: Alan Mills was selected in the first round (13th overall) of the amateur draft, but did not sign.
- January 14, 1986: Curt Schilling was selected in the second round of the amateur draft, and signed on May 30.
- March 28, 1986: Mike Easler was traded to the New York Yankees for Don Baylor.

== Spring Training ==
The Red Sox held spring training at Chain of Lakes Park in Winter Haven, Florida, for the 21st season.

Boston Win	Boston Loss	Tie Game

1986 Boston Red Sox Spring Training Log
March

#	Date	Opponent	Score	Record	Source
1	March 7	@ Tigers	0─3	0─1	
2	March 8	@ Tigers	4─6	0─2	
3	March 9	@ Tigers	2─11	0─3	
4	March 10	@ Los Angeles	7─6	1─3	
5	March 11	@ Orioles	5─1	2─3	
6	March 12	Vs. Tigers	2─3	3─3	
7	March 13	@ Tigers	8─9	3─4	
8	March 16	@ Astros	8─5	4─4	
9	March 17	@ Cardinals	3─6	4─5	
10	March 18	Vs. Blue Jays	5─2	4─6	
11	March 19	@ Mets	4─7	4─7	
12	March 20	Vs. Tigers	10─9	4─8	
12	March 21	Vs. Twins	8─1	4─9	
13	March 22	@ Twins	0─4	4─10	
14	March 23	@ Royals	3─1	5─10	
15	March 24	Vs. Astros	4─3	5─11	
16	March 25	@ Pirates	5─6	5─12	
17	March 26	@ White Sox	27─10	6─12	
18	March 27	Vs. Pirates	5─2	6─13	
19	March 28	Vs. Mets	5─6	7─13	
20	March 29	Vs. Tigers	5─9	8─13	
21	March 30	Vs. Blue Jays	2─7	9─13	
22	March 31	Vs. Expos	6─8	9─13	

April

#	Date	Opponent	Score	Record	Source
23	April 1	Vs. Phillies	3─0	9─14	
24	April 2	@ Tigers	3─9	9─15	
25	April 3	@ Pirates	3─4	9─16	
26	April 4	@ Astros	9─0	10─16	
27	April 5	Vs. Tigers	0─6	11─16	

== Regular season ==
=== April ===
The Red Sox ended the series at Chicago with a 12-2 victory.

=== July ===
In the second game of the series (July 1), the Red Sox defeated the Blue Jays 9-7, with Tom Seaver making his debut with the Red Sox.

Record by month
Month	Record		Cumulative		AL East		Ref.
Month	Won	Lost	Won	Lost	Position	GB	Ref.
April	11	8	11	8	2nd (tie)	2 1/2	
May	21	7	32	15	1st	+2 1/2	
June	17	10	49	25	1st	+8	
July	10	16	59	41	1st	+4	
August	17	13	76	54	1st	+3 1/2	
September	18	8	94	62	1st	+8 1/2	
October	1	4	95	66	1st	+5 1/2	

The Red Sox played only 161 games, as a road game scheduled against the Milwaukee Brewers on September 24 was rained out, and was not rescheduled as it had no bearing on the divisional race.

=== Highlights ===
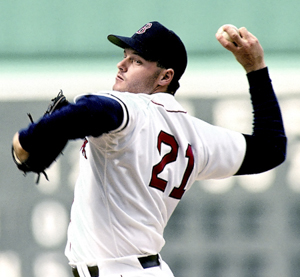
Roger Clemens

- On April 29 at Fenway Park, 23-year-old Roger Clemens struck out 20 Seattle Mariners to set a major league record for a nine-inning game.
- Clemens finished the regular season with 24 wins, the most by a Red Sox pitcher since Mel Parnell won 25 games in 1949.

=== Season standings ===
AL East
Team	W	L	Pct.	GB	Home	Road
Boston Red Sox	95	66	.590	—	51‍–‍30	44‍–‍36
New York Yankees	90	72	.556	5½	41‍–‍39	49‍–‍33
Detroit Tigers	87	75	.537	8½	49‍–‍32	38‍–‍43
Toronto Blue Jays	86	76	.531	9½	42‍–‍39	44‍–‍37
Cleveland Indians	84	78	.519	11½	45‍–‍35	39‍–‍43
Milwaukee Brewers	77	84	.478	18	41‍–‍39	36‍–‍45
Baltimore Orioles	73	89	.451	22½	37‍–‍42	36‍–‍47

This was the first season since 1904 that the Yankees franchise (then known as the Highlanders) finished second in the standings to the Red Sox franchise (then known as the Americans).

=== Record vs. opponents ===
1986 American League record Sources:
Team	BAL	BOS	CAL	CWS	CLE	DET	KC	MIL	MIN	NYY	OAK	SEA	TEX	TOR
Baltimore	—	4–9	6–6	9–3	4–9	1–12	6–6	6–7	8–4	5–8	5–7	6–6	5–7	8–5
Boston	9–4	—	5–7	7–5	10–3	7–6	6–6	6–6	10–2	5–8	7–5	8–4	8–4	7–6
California	6–6	7–5	—	7–6	6–6	7–5	8–5	5–7	7–6	7–5	10–3	8–5	8–5	6–6
Chicago	3–9	5–7	6–7	—	5–7	6–6	7–6	5–7	6–7	6–6	7–6	8–5	2–11	6–6
Cleveland	9–4	3–10	6–6	7–5	—	4–9	8–4	8–5	6–6	5–8	10–2	9–3	6–6	3–10–1
Detroit	12–1	6–7	5–7	6–6	9–4	—	5–7	8–5	7–5	6–7	6–6	6–6	7–5	4–9
Kansas City	6–6	6–6	5–8	6–7	4–8	7–5	—	6–6	6–7	4–8	8–5	5–8	8–5	5–7
Milwaukee	7–6	6–6	7–5	7–5	5–8	5–8	6–6	—	4–8	8–5	5–7	6–6	4–8	7–6
Minnesota	4–8	2–10	6–7	7–6	6–6	5–7	7–6	8–4	—	4–8	6–7	6–7	6–7	4–8
New York	8–5	8–5	5–7	6–6	8–5	7–6	8–4	5–8	8–4	—	5–7	8–4	7–5	7–6
Oakland	7–5	5–7	3–10	6–7	2–10	6–6	5–8	7–5	7–6	7–5	—	10–3	3–10	8–4
Seattle	6–6	4–8	5–8	5–8	3–9	6–6	8–5	6–6	7–6	4–8	3–10	—	4–9	6–6
Texas	7–5	4–8	5–8	11–2	6–6	5–7	5–8	8–4	7–6	5–7	10–3	9–4	—	5–7
Toronto	5–8	6–7	6–6	6–6	10–3–1	9–4	7–5	6–7	8–4	6–7	4–8	6–6	7–5	—

=== Notable transactions ===
- June 2, 1986: The Red Sox selected Scott Cooper in the third round of the 1986 Major League Baseball draft.
- June 29, 1986: Steve Lyons was traded by the Red Sox to the Chicago White Sox for Tom Seaver.
- August 17, 1986: The Seattle Mariners traded Spike Owen and Dave Henderson to the Red Sox for Rey Quiñones and players to be named later (Mike Brown, Mike Trujillo, and John Christensen).

=== Opening day lineup ===
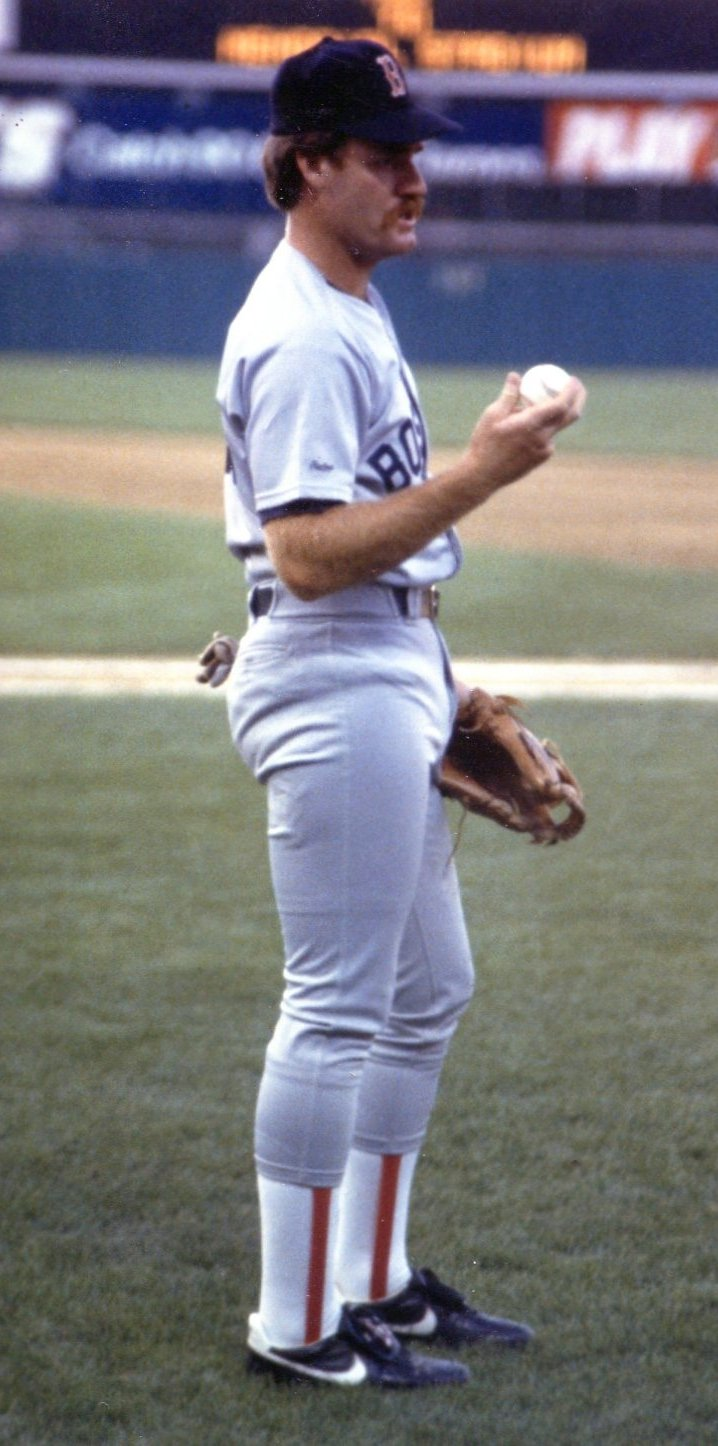
Wade Boggs

24	Dwight Evans	RF
26	Wade Boggs	3B
6	Bill Buckner	1B
14	Jim Rice	LF
25	Don Baylor	DH
10	Rich Gedman	C
20	Tony Armas	CF
17	Marty Barrett	2B
18	Glenn Hoffman	SS
47	Bruce Hurst	P

=== Alumni game ===
On May 17, the Red Sox held an old-timers game at Fenway, before a scheduled game with the Texas Rangers. The game–themed to commemorate the 40th anniversary of the pennant-winning 1946 Red Sox–welcomed back 19 alumni of the team and was also the first to invite non-Red Sox alumni. Besides Ted Williams, Luis Tiant, and Rico Petrocelli, the day featured appearances by all three DiMaggio brothers: Joe, Vince, and Dom. The umpiring crew included Hall of Fame inductee Jocko Conlan.

=== Tommy Harper dismissal and legal action ===
During the spring of 1985, Tommy Harper—a former outfielder and coach with a 10-year association with the Red Sox—spoke out against the team's long-term association with the all-white Elks Club of Winter Haven, Florida, where the team then held spring training. Harper was let go by the Red Sox in December 1985, and subsequently filed a complaint with the Equal Employment Opportunity Commission (EEOC). On July 1, 1986, the EEOC ruled that Harper's dismissal "was held to be without merit". In December 1986, Harper and the Red Sox reached a settlement, the terms of which were not disclosed.

=== Roster ===
1986 Boston Red Sox
Roster
Pitchers: 23 Oil Can Boyd; 27 Mike Brown; 21 Roger Clemens; 28 Steve Crawford; 44 Wes Gardner; 47 Bruce Hurst; 48 Tim Lollar; 49 Al Nipper; 43 Joe Sambito; 31 Calvin Schiraldi; 41 Tom Seaver; 19 Jeff Sellers; 46 Bob Stanley; 53 Sammy Stewart; 45 Mike Trujillo; 42 Rob Woodward	Catchers: 10 Rich Gedman; 50 Dave Sax; 15 Marc Sullivan; Infielders: 17 Marty Barrett; 25 Don Baylor; 26 Wade Boggs; 6 Bill Buckner; 27 Pat Dodson; 18 Glenn Hoffman; 5 Spike Owen; 51 Rey Quiñones; 7 Ed Romero; 11 Dave Stapleton	Outfielders: 20 Tony Armas; 24 Dwight Evans; 39 Mike Greenwell; 40 Dave Henderson; 12 Steve Lyons; 14 Jim Rice; 16 Kevin Romine; 37 Mike Stenhouse; 55 La Schelle Tarver	Manager: 1 John McNamara; Coaches: 34 Bill Fischer (Pitching); 33 Walt Hriniak (Hitting & First base); 36 Rene Lachemann (Third base); 35 Joe Morgan (Bullpen)

== Game log ==
=== Regular season ===
Legend
	Red Sox win
	Red Sox loss
	Postponement
	Clinched division
**Bold**	Red Sox team member

1986 regular season game log: 95–66 (Home: 51–30; Away: 44–36)
April: 11–8 (Home: 4–4; Away: 4–4)

#	Date	Time (ET)	Opponent	Score	Win	Loss	Save	Time of Game	Attendance	Record	Box/ Streak
1	April 7		@ Tigers								
2	April 9		@ Tigers								
3	April 10		@ Tigers								
4	April 11		@ White Sox								
5	April 12		@ White Sox								
6	April 13		@ White Sox								
7	April 14		Royals								
8	April 16		Royals								
9	April 17		Royals								
10	April 18		White Sox								
11	April 19		White Sox								
12	April 20		White Sox								
13	April 21		Tigers								
14	April 22		Tigers								
15	April 23		Tigers								
16	April 25		@ Royals								
17	April 26		@ Royals								
–	April 27		@ Royals	Postponed (rain) Makeup date: August 12							
18	April 29		Mariners								
19	April 30		Mariners								

May: 21–7 (Home: 9–3; Away: 12–4)

#	Date	Time (ET)	Opponent	Score	Win	Loss	Save	Time of Game	Attendance	Record	Box/ Streak
20	May 1		Mariners								
21	May 2		Athletics								
22	May 3		Athletics								
23	May 4		Athletics								
24	May 5		Angels								
25	May 6		Angels								
26	May 7		@ Mariners								
27	May 8		@ Mariners								
28	May 9		@ Athletics								
29	May 10		@ Athletics								
30	May 11		@ Athletics								
31	May 12		@ Angels								
32	May 13		@ Angels								
33	May 14		@ Angels								
34	May 16		Rangers								
35	May 17		Rangers								
36	May 18		Rangers								
37	May 19		Twins								
38	May 20		Twins								
39	May 21		Twins								
40	May 23		@ Rangers								
41	May 24		@ Rangers								
42	May 25		@ Rangers								
43	May 26		@ Indians								
44	May 27		@ Indians								
45	May 28		@ Indians								
46	May 30		@ Twins								
47	May 31		@ Twins								

June: 17–10 (Home: 7–6; Away: 10–4)

#	Date	Time (ET)	Opponent	Score	Win	Loss	Save	Time of Game	Attendance	Record	Box/ Streak
48	June 1		@ Twins								
49	June 2		Indians								
50	June 3		Indians								
51	June 4		Indians								
52	June 5		@ Brewers								
53	June 6		@ Brewers								
54	June 7		@ Brewers								
55	June 8		@ Brewers								
56	June 9		@ Blue Jays								
57	June 10		@ Blue Jays								
58	June 11		@ Blue Jays								
–	June 12		Brewers	Postponed (rain) Makeup date: September 16							
59	June 13		Brewers								
60	June 14		Brewers								
61	June 15		Brewers								
62	June 16		@ Yankees								
63	June 17		@ Yankees								
64	June 18		@ Yankees								
65	June 20		Orioles								
66	June 21		Orioles								
67	June 22		Orioles								
68	June 23		Yankees								
69	June 24		Yankees								
70	June 25		Yankees								
71	June 27		@ Orioles								
72	June 28		@ Orioles								
73	June 29		@ Orioles								
74	June 30		Blue Jays								

July: 10–16 (Home: 7–6; Away: 3–10)

#	Date	Time (ET)	Opponent	Score	Win	Loss	Save	Time of Game	Attendance	Record	Box/ Streak
75	July 1		Blue Jays								
76	July 2		Blue Jays								
77	July 3		Blue Jays								
78	July 4		Mariners								
79	July 5		Mariners								
80	July 6		Mariners								
81	July 7		Athletics								
82	July 8		Athletics								
83	July 9		Athletics								
84	July 10		Angels								
85	July 11		Angels								
86	July 12		Angels								
87	July 13		Angels								
88	July 17		@ Mariners								
89	July 18		@ Mariners								
90	July 19		@ Mariners								
91	July 20		@ Mariners								
92	July 21		@ Athletics								
93	July 22		@ Athletics								
94	July 23		@ Athletics								
95	July 25		@ Angels								
96	July 26		@ Angels								
97	July 27		@ Angels								
98	July 28		@ White Sox								
99	July 29		@ White Sox								
100	July 30		@ White Sox								

August: 17–13 (Home: 7–5; Away: 10–8)

#	Date	Time (ET)	Opponent	Score	Win	Loss	Save	Time of Game	Attendance	Record	Box/ Streak
101	August 1		Royals								
102	August 2		Royals								
103	August 3		Royals								
104	August 4		White Sox								
105	August 5		White Sox								
106	August 6		White Sox								
107	August 8		@ Tigers								
108	August 9		@ Tigers								
109	August 10		@ Tigers								
110	August 11		@ Tigers								
111	August 12		@ Royals								
112	August 12		@ Royals								
113	August 13		@ Royals								
114	August 14		@ Royals								
115	August 15		Tigers								
116	August 16		Tigers								
117	August 17		Tigers								
118	August 18		@ Twins								
119	August 19		@ Twins								
120	August 20		@ Twins								
121	August 21		@ Indians								
122	August 22		@ Indians								
123	August 23		@ Indians								
124	August 24		@ Indians								
125	August 25		@ Rangers								
126	August 26		@ Rangers								
127	August 27		@ Rangers								
128	August 29		Indians								
129	August 30		Indians								
130	August 31		Indians								

September: 18–8 (Home: 13–2; Away: 5–6)

#	Date	Time (ET)	Opponent	Score	Win	Loss	Save	Time of Game	Attendance	Record	Box/ Streak
131	September 1		Rangers								
132	September 2		Rangers								
133	September 3		Rangers								
134	September 5		Twins								
135	September 6		Twins								
136	September 7		Twins								
137	September 8		@ Orioles								
138	September 9		@ Orioles								
139	September 10		@ Orioles								
140	September 11		@ Orioles								
141	September 12		@ Yankees								
142	September 13		@ Yankees								
143	September 14		@ Yankees								
144	September 16		Brewers								
145	September 16		Brewers								
146	September 17		Brewers								
147	September 18		Brewers								
148	September 19		@ Blue Jays								
149	September 20		@ Blue Jays								
150	September 21		@ Blue Jays								
151	September 23		@ Brewers								
–	September 24		@ Brewers	Cancelled (rain)							
152	September 26		Blue Jays								
153	September 27		Blue Jays								
154	September 28		Blue Jays								
155	September 29		Orioles								
156	September 30		Orioles								

October: 1–4 (Home: 1–4; Away: 0–0)

#	Date	Time (ET)	Opponent	Score	Win	Loss	Save	Time of Game	Attendance	Record	Box/ Streak
157	October 1		Orioles								
158	October 2		Yankees								
–	October 3		Yankees	Postponed (rain) Makeup date: October 4							
159	October 4		Yankees								
160	October 4		Yankees								
161	October 5		Yankees								

=== Detailed records ===
**American League**
Opponent	Home	Away	Total	Pct.	Runs scored	Runs allowed
**AL East**
Baltimore Orioles
**Boston Red Sox**	—	—	—	—	—	—
Cleveland Indians
Detroit Tigers
Milwaukee Brewers
New York Yankees
Toronto Blue Jays
	**0–0**	**0–0**	**0–0**	–	**0**	**0**
**AL West**
California Angels	3–3	2–4	5–7	.417	41	57
Chicago White Sox
Kansas City Royals
Minnesota Twins
Oakland Athletics
Seattle Mariners
Texas Rangers
	**3–3**	**2–4**	**5–7**	**.417**	**41**	**57**
	**3–3**	**2–4**	**5–7**	**.417**	**41**	**57**

==== Month-by-Month ====
Month	Games	Won	Lost	Win %	RS	RA
April	19	11	8	0.579	82	61
May	28	21	7	0.750	158	109
June	27	17	10	0.630	118	118
July	26	10	16	0.385	107	147
August	30	17	13	0.567	162	130
September	28	18	8	0.692	158	103
October	5	1	4	0.200	16	28
Total	161	95	66	0.590	794	696

	Games	Won	Lost	Win %	RS	RA
Home	81	51	30	0.630	389	350
Road	80	44	36	0.550	405	346
Total	161	95	66	0.590	794	696

=== Composite Box ===
1986 Boston Red Sox Inning–by–Inning Boxscore
Team	1	2	3	4	5	6	7	8	9	10	11	12	R	H	E
Opponents
Red Sox

=== Postseason game log ===
Legend
	Red Sox win
	Red Sox loss
	Postponement
**Bold**	Red Sox team member

1986 Postseason game log: 7–7 (Home: 4–3; Away: 3–4)
AL Championship Series vs. California Angels 4–3 (Home: 3–1; Away: 1–2)

#	Date	Time (ET)	Opponent	Score	Win	Loss	Save	Time of Game	Attendance	Series	Box/ Streak
1	October 7	8:25 p.m. EDT	Angels								
2	October 8	3:05 p.m. EDT	Angels								
3	October 10	8:20 p.m. EDT	@ Angels								
4	October 11	8:20 p.m. EDT	@ Angels								
5	October 12	3:00 p.m. EDT	@ Angels								
6	October 14	8:20 p.m. EDT	Angels								
7	October 15	8:20 p.m. EDT	Angels								

World Series vs. New York Mets 3–4 (Home: 1–2; Away: 2–2)

#	Date	Time (ET)	Opponent	Score	Win	Loss	Save	Time of Game	Attendance	Series	Box/ Streak
1	October 18	8:30 p.m. EDT	@ Mets	1–0	**Hurst** (1–0)	Darling (0–1)	**Schiraldi** (1)	2:59	55,076	BOS 1–0	W1
2	October 19	8:25 p.m. EDT	@ Mets	9–3	**Crawford** (1–0)	Gooden (0–1)	**Stanley** (1)	3:36	55,063	BOS 2–0	W2
3	October 21	8:30 p.m. EDT	Mets	1–7	Ojeda (1–0)	**Boyd** (0–1)	—	2:58	33,595	BOS 2–1	L1
4	October 22	8:25 p.m. EDT	Mets	2–6	Darling (1–1)	**Nipper** (0–1)	Orosco (1)	3:22	33,920	TIE 2–2	L2
5	October 23	8:35 p.m. EDT	Mets	4–2	**Hurst** (2–0)	Gooden (0–2)	—	3:09	34,010	BOS 3–2	W1
6	October 25	8:25 p.m. EDT	@ Mets	5–6 (10)	Aguilera (1–0)	**Schiraldi** (0–1)	—	4:02	55,078	TIE 3–3	L1
—	October 26	8:25 p.m. EST	@ Mets	Postponed (rain); Makeup: October 27							
7	October 27	8:15 p.m. EST	@ Mets	5–8	McDowell (1–0)	**Schiraldi** (0–2)	Orosco (2)	3:11	55,032	NYN 4–3	L2

== Starting Lineups ==
=== Regular Season ===
==== Batting Order ====
1986 Regular Season Batting Order game log
April

#	Date	Opponent	1st	2nd	3rd	4th	5th	6th	7th	8th	9th

May

#	Date	Opponent	1st	2nd	3rd	4th	5th	6th	7th	8th	9th
24	May 5	CAL									
25	May 6	CAL									
31	May 12	@ CAL									
32	May 13	@ CAL									
33	May 14	@ CAL									

June

#	Date	Opponent	1st	2nd	3rd	4th	5th	6th	7th	8th	9th

July

#	Date	Opponent	1st	2nd	3rd	4th	5th	6th	7th	8th	9th
84	July 10	CAL									
85	July 11	CAL									
86	July 12	CAL									
87	July 13	CAL									
95	July 25	@ CAL									
96	July 26	@ CAL									
97	July 27	@ CAL									

August

#	Date	Opponent	1st	2nd	3rd	4th	5th	6th	7th	8th	9th

September

#	Date	Opponent	1st	2nd	3rd	4th	5th	6th	7th	8th	9th

October

#	Date	Opponent	1st	2nd	3rd	4th	5th	6th	7th	8th	9th

==== Defensive Lineup ====
1986 Regular Season Defensive Lineup game log
April

#	Date	Opponent	C	1B	2B	3B	SS	LF	CF	RF	P

May

#	Date	Opponent	C	1B	2B	3B	SS	LF	CF	RF	P
24	May 5	CAL									
25	May 6	CAL									
31	May 12	@ CAL									
32	May 13	@ CAL									
33	May 14	@ CAL									

June

#	Date	Opponent	C	1B	2B	3B	SS	LF	CF	RF	P

July

#	Date	Opponent	C	1B	2B	3B	SS	LF	CF	RF	P
84	July 10	CAL									
85	July 11	CAL									
86	July 12	CAL									
87	July 13	CAL									
95	July 25	@ CAL									
96	July 26	@ CAL									
97	July 27	@ CAL									

August

#	Date	Opponent	C	1B	2B	3B	SS	LF	CF	RF	P

September

#	Date	Opponent	C	1B	2B	3B	SS	LF	CF	RF	P

October

#	Date	Opponent	C	1B	2B	3B	SS	LF	CF	RF	P

=== Postseason ===
==== Batting Order ====
1986 Postseason Batting Order game log
AL Championship Series vs. California Angels

#	Date	Opponent	1st	2nd	3rd	4th	5th	6th	7th	8th	9th
1	October 7	CAL									
2	October 8	CAL									
3	October 10	@ CAL									
4	October 11	@ CAL									
5	October 12	@ CAL									
6	October 14	CAL									
7	October 15	CAL									

World Series vs. New York Mets

#	Date	Opponent	1st	2nd	3rd	4th	5th	6th	7th	8th	9th
1	October 18	@ NYM	#26; Boggs (3B)	#17; Barrett (2B)	#6; Buckner (1B)	#14; Rice (LF)	#24; Evans (RF)	#10; Gedman (C)	#40; Henderson (CF)	#5; Owen (SS)	#47; Hurst (SP)
2	October 19	@ NYM	#26; Boggs (3B)	#17; Barrett (2B)	#6; Buckner (1B)	#14; Rice (LF)	#24; Evans (RF)	#10; Gedman (C)	#40; Henderson (CF)	#5; Owen (SS)	#21; Clemens (SP)
3	October 21	NYM	#26; Boggs (3B)	#17; Barrett (2B)	#6; Buckner (1B)	#14; Rice (LF)	#25; Baylor (DH)	#24; Evans (RF)	#10; Gedman (C)	#40; Henderson (CF)	#5; Owen (SS)
4	October 22	NYM	#26; Boggs (3B)	#17; Barrett (2B)	#6; Buckner (1B)	#14; Rice (LF)	#25; Baylor (DH)	#24; Evans (RF)	#10; Gedman (C)	#40; Henderson (CF)	#5; Owen (SS)
5	October 23	NYM	#26; Boggs (3B)	#17; Barrett (2B)	#6; Buckner (1B)	#14; Rice (LF)	#25; Baylor (DH)	#24; Evans (RF)	#10; Gedman (C)	#40; Henderson (CF)	#5; Owen (SS)
6	October 25	@ NYM	#26; Boggs (3B)	#17; Barrett (2B)	#6; Buckner (1B)	#14; Rice (LF)	#24; Evans (RF)	#10; Gedman (C)	#40; Henderson (CF)	#5; Owen (SS)	#21; Clemens (SP)
7	October 27	@ NYM	#26; Boggs (3B)	#17; Barrett (2B)	#6; Buckner (1B)	#14; Rice (LF)	#24; Evans (RF)	#10; Gedman (C)	#40; Henderson (CF)	#5; Owen (SS)	#47; Hurst (SP)

==== Defensive Lineup ====
1986 Postseason Defensive Lineup game log
AL Championship Series vs. California Angels

#	Date	Opponent	C	1B	2B	3B	SS	LF	CF	RF	P
1	October 7	CAL									
2	October 8	CAL									
3	October 10	@ CAL									
4	October 11	@ CAL									
5	October 12	@ CAL									
6	October 14	CAL									
7	October 15	CAL									

World Series vs. New York Mets

#	Date	Opponent	C	1B	2B	3B	SS	LF	CF	RF	P
1	October 18	@ NYM	#10; Gedman	#6; Buckner	#17; Barrett	#26; Boggs	#5; Owen	#14; Rice	#40; Henderson	#24; Evans	#47; Hurst
2	October 19	@ NYM	#10; Gedman	#6; Buckner	#17; Barrett	#26; Boggs	#5; Owen	#14; Rice	#40; Henderson	#24; Evans	#21; Clemens
3	October 21	NYM	#10; Gedman	#6; Buckner	#17; Barrett	#26; Boggs	#5; Owen	#14; Rice	#40; Henderson	#24; Evans	#23; Boyd
4	October 22	NYM	#10; Gedman	#6; Buckner	#17; Barrett	#26; Boggs	#5; Owen	#14; Rice	#40; Henderson	#24; Evans	#49; Nipper
5	October 23	NYM	#10; Gedman	#6; Buckner	#17; Barrett	#26; Boggs	#5; Owen	#14; Rice	#40; Henderson	#24; Evans	#47; Hurst
6	October 25	@ NYM	#10; Gedman	#6; Buckner	#17; Barrett	#26; Boggs	#5; Owen	#14; Rice	#40; Henderson	#24; Evans	#21; Clemens
7	October 27	@ NYM	#10; Gedman	#6; Buckner	#17; Barrett	#26; Boggs	#5; Owen	#14; Rice	#40; Henderson	#24; Evans	#47; Hurst

== Game Umpires ==
=== Regular Season ===
1986 Regular Season Umpire game log
April

#	Date	Opponent	HP	1B	2B	3B

May

#	Date	Opponent	HP	1B	2B	3B
24	May 5	CAL	#21; Ken Kaiser	#12; Terry Cooney (crew chief)	#14; Steve Palermo	#28; Larry Young
25	May 6	CAL	#12; Terry Cooney (crew chief)	#14; Steve Palermo	#28; Larry Young	#21; Ken Kaiser
31	May 12	@ CAL	#13; Derryl Cousins	#25; Mark Johnson	#33; Durwood Merrill (crew chief)	#35; Ted Hendry
32	May 13	@ CAL	#25; Mark Johnson	#33; Durwood Merrill (crew chief)	#35; Ted Hendry	#13; Derryl Cousins
33	May 14	@ CAL	#33; Durwood Merrill (crew chief)	#35; Ted Hendry	#13; Derryl Cousins	#25; Mark Johnson

June

#	Date	Opponent	HP	1B	2B	3B

July

#	Date	Opponent	HP	1B	2B	3B
84	July 10	CAL	#15; Joe Brinkman (crew chief)	#38; Tim Tschida	#12; Terry Cooney	#21; Ken Kaiser
85	July 11	CAL	#38; Tim Tschida	#12; Terry Cooney	#21; Ken Kaiser	#15; Joe Brinkman (crew chief)
86	July 12	CAL	#12; Terry Cooney	#21; Ken Kaiser	#15; Joe Brinkman (crew chief)	#38; Tim Tschida
87	July 13	CAL	#21; Ken Kaiser	#15; Joe Brinkman (crew chief)	#38; Tim Tschida	#12; Terry Cooney
95	July 25	@ CAL	#31; Mike Reilly (crew chief)	#37; Drew Coble	#36; Tim McClelland	#28; Larry Young
96	July 26	@ CAL	#37; Drew Coble	#36; Tim McClelland	#28; Larry Young	#31; Mike Reilly (crew chief)
97	July 27	@ CAL	#36; Tim McClelland	#28; Larry Young	#31; Mike Reilly (crew chief)	#37; Drew Coble

August

#	Date	Opponent	HP	1B	2B	3B

September

#	Date	Opponent	HP	1B	2B	3B

October

#	Date	Opponent	HP	1B	2B	3B

=== Postseason ===
1986 Postseason Umpire game log
AL Championship Series vs. California Angels

#	Date	Opponent	HP	1B	2B	3B	LF	RF
1	October 7	CAL	#22; Larry Barnett (crew chief)	#10; Larry McCoy	#12; Terry Cooney	#2; Nick Bremigan	#27; Rocky Roe	#19; Rich Garcia
2	October 8	CAL	#10; Larry McCoy	#12; Terry Cooney	#2; Nick Bremigan	#27; Rocky Roe	#19; Rich Garcia	#22; Larry Barnett (crew chief)
3	October 10	@ CAL	#12; Terry Cooney	#2; Nick Bremigan	#27; Rocky Roe	#19; Rich Garcia	#22; Larry Barnett (crew chief)	#10; Larry McCoy
4	October 11	@ CAL	#2; Nick Bremigan	#27; Rocky Roe	#19; Rich Garcia	#22; Larry Barnett (crew chief)	#10; Larry McCoy	#12; Terry Cooney
5	October 12	@ CAL	#27; Rocky Roe	#19; Rich Garcia	#22; Larry Barnett (crew chief)	#10; Larry McCoy	#12; Terry Cooney	#2; Nick Bremigan
6	October 14	CAL	#19; Rich Garcia	#22; Larry Barnett (crew chief)	#10; Larry McCoy	#12; Terry Cooney	#2; Nick Bremigan	#27; Rocky Roe
7	October 15	CAL	#22; Larry Barnett (crew chief)	#10; Larry McCoy	#19; Rich Garcia	#2; Nick Bremigan	(none)	#27; Rocky Roe

World Series vs. New York Mets

#	Date	Opponent	HP	1B	2B	3B	LF	RF
1	October 18	@ NYM	#9; John Kibler (NL) (crew chief)	#3; Jim Evans (AL)	#21; Harry Wendelstedt (NL)	#15; Joe Brinkman (AL)	#11; Ed Montague (NL)	#20; Dale Ford (AL)
2	October 19	@ NYM	#3; Jim Evans (AL)	#21; Harry Wendelstedt (NL)	#15; Joe Brinkman (AL)	#11; Ed Montague (NL)	#20; Dale Ford (AL)	#9; John Kibler (NL) (crew chief)
3	October 21	NYM	#21; Harry Wendelstedt (NL)	#15; Joe Brinkman (AL)	#11; Ed Montague (NL)	#20; Dale Ford (AL)	#9; John Kibler (NL) (crew chief)	#3; Jim Evans (AL)
4	October 22	NYM	#15; Joe Brinkman (AL)	#11; Ed Montague (NL)	#20; Dale Ford (AL)	#9; John Kibler (NL) (crew chief)	#3; Jim Evans (AL)	#21; Harry Wendelstedt (NL)
5	October 23	NYM	#11; Ed Montague (NL)	#20; Dale Ford (AL)	#9; John Kibler (NL) (crew chief)	#3; Jim Evans (AL)	#21; Harry Wendelstedt (NL)	#15; Joe Brinkman (AL)
6	October 25	@ NYM	#20; Dale Ford (AL)	#9; John Kibler (NL) (crew chief)	#3; Jim Evans (AL)	#21; Harry Wendelstedt (NL)	#15; Joe Brinkman (AL)	#11; Ed Montague (NL)
7	October 27	@ NYM	#9; John Kibler (NL) (crew chief)	#3; Jim Evans (AL)	#21; Harry Wendelstedt (NL)	#15; Joe Brinkman (AL)	#11; Ed Montague (NL)	#20; Dale Ford (AL)

== Player stats ==
=== Batting ===
==== Starters by position ====
Note: Pos = Position; G = Games played; AB = At bats; H = Hits; 2B = Doubles; 3B = Triples; HR = Home runs; R = Runs; RBI = Runs batted in; Avg. = Batting average; OBP = On base percentage; SLG = Slugging percentage

Pos	Player	G	AB	H	2B	3B	HR	R	RBI	Avg.	OBP	SLG	Reference
C	Rich Gedman	135	462	119	29	0	16	49	65	.258	.315	.424	
1B	Bill Buckner	153	629	168	39	2	18	73	102	.267	.311	.421	
2B	Marty Barrett	158	625	179	39	4	4	94	60	.286	.353	.381	
3B	Wade Boggs	149	580	207	47	2	8	107	71	.357	.453	.486	
SS	Rey Quiñones	62	190	45	12	1	2	26	15	.237	.315	.342	
LF	Jim Rice	157	618	200	39	2	20	98	110	.324	.384	.490	
CF	Tony Armas	121	425	112	21	4	11	40	58	.264	.305	.409	
RF	Dwight Evans	152	529	137	33	2	26	86	97	.259	.376	.476	
DH	Don Baylor	160	585	139	23	1	31	93	94	.238	.344	.439	

==== Other batters ====
Note: G = Games played; AB = At bats; H = Hits; Avg. = Batting average; HR = Home runs; RBI = Runs batted in

Player	G	AB	H	Avg.	HR	RBI	Reference
Ed Romero	100	233	49	.210	2	23	
Spike Owen	42	126	23	.183	1	10	
Steve Lyons	59	124	31	.250	1	14	
Marc Sullivan	41	119	23	.193	1	14	
Dave Henderson	36	51	10	.196	1	3	
Dave Stapleton	39	39	5	.128	0	3	
Mike Greenwell	31	35	11	.314	0	4	
Kevin Romine	35	35	9	.257	0	2	
La Schelle Tarver	13	25	3	.120	0	1	
Glenn Hoffman	12	23	5	.217	0	1	
Mike Stenhouse	21	21	2	.095	0	1	
Pat Dodson	9	12	5	.417	1	3	
Dave Sax	4	11	5	.455	1	1	

=== Pitching ===
==== Starting pitchers ====
Note: G = Games pitched; IP = Innings pitched; W = Wins; L = Losses; ERA = Earned run average; SO = Strikeouts

Player	G	IP	W	L	ERA	SO	Reference
Roger Clemens	33	254.0	24	4	2.48	238	
Oil Can Boyd	30	214.1	16	10	3.78	129	
Bruce Hurst	25	174.1	13	8	2.99	167	
Al Nipper	26	159.0	10	12	5.38	79	
Tom Seaver	16	104.1	5	7	3.80	72	
Jeff Sellers	14	82.0	3	7	4.94	51	

==== Other pitchers ====
Note: G = Games pitched; IP = Innings pitched; W = Wins; L = Losses; ERA = Earned run average; SO = Strikeouts

Player	G	IP	W	L	ERA	SO	Reference
Mike Brown	15	57.1	4	4	5.34	32	
Rob Woodward	9	35.2	2	3	5.30	14	

==== Relief pitchers ====
Note: G = Games pitched; W = Wins; L = Losses; SV = Saves; ERA = Earned run average; SO = Strikeouts

Player	G	W	L	SV	ERA	SO	Reference
Bob Stanley	66	6	6	16	4.37	54	
Joe Sambito	53	2	0	12	4.84	30	
Steve Crawford	40	0	2	4	3.92	32	
Tim Lollar	32	2	0	0	6.91	28	
Sammy Stewart	27	4	1	0	4.38	47	
Calvin Schiraldi	25	4	2	9	1.41	55	
Mike Trujillo	3	0	0	0	9.53	4	
Wes Gardner	1	0	0	0	9.00	1	

== Postseason ==
=== ALCS ===
Game	Score	Date	Location	Attendance
1	California – 8, Boston – 1	October 7	Fenway Park	32,993
2	California – 2, Boston – 9	October 8	Fenway Park	32,786
3	Boston – 3, California – 5	October 10	Anaheim Stadium	64,206
4	Boston – 3, California – 4 (11 innings)	October 11	Anaheim Stadium	64,223
5	Boston – 7, California – 6 (11 innings)	October 12	Anaheim Stadium	64,223
6	California – 4, Boston – 10	October 14	Fenway Park	32,998
7	California – 1, Boston – 8	October 15	Fenway Park	33,001

=== World Series ===
NL New York Mets (4) vs. AL Boston Red Sox (3)
Game	Score	Date	Location	Attendance	Time of Game
1	Red Sox – 1, Mets – 0	October 18	Shea Stadium (New York City)	57,908	3:18
2	Red Sox – 9, Mets – 3	October 19	Shea Stadium (New York City)	57,911	2:44
3	Mets – 7, Red Sox – 1	October 21	Fenway Park (Boston)	33,595	3:09
4	Mets – 6, Red Sox – 2	October 22	Fenway Park (Boston)	33,920	3:22
5	Mets – 2, Red Sox – 4	October 23	Fenway Park (Boston)	34,010	2:55
6	Red Sox – 5, Mets – 6 (10 inn.)	October 25	Shea Stadium (New York City)	57,908	3:18
7	Red Sox – 5, Mets – 8	October 27	Shea Stadium (New York City)	57,911	2:44

== Awards and honors ==
Awards

Marty Barrett, ALCS MVP

Don Baylor, Silver Slugger Award (DH)

Wade Boggs, Silver Slugger Award (3B), AL Player of the Month (May)

Roger Clemens:

- American League Cy Young Award.
- American League Most Valuable Player.
- AL Pitcher of the Month (April, June).

Bruce Hurst, AL Pitcher of the Month (September)

Accomplishments

Wade Boggs:

- Major League Baseball Batting Average Leader (.357).
- American League Walks Leader (105).
- Major League Baseball On-base percentage Leader (.453).

Roger Clemens:

- American League ERA Leader (2.48).
- American League Wins Leader (24).

All-Star Game

Name	Starter or Reserve	Position	Reference
Wade Boggs	Starter	3B	
Roger Clemens	Starter	P	
Rich Gedman	Reserve	C	
Jim Rice	Reserve	LF	

== Farm system ==
Level	Team	League	Manager
AAA	Pawtucket Red Sox	International League	Ed Nottle
AA	New Britain Red Sox	Eastern League	Tony Torchia
A	Winter Haven Red Sox	Florida State League	Dave Holt
A	Greensboro Hornets	South Atlantic League	Doug Camilli
A-Short Season	Elmira Pioneers	New York–Penn League	Bill Limoncelli
