= 1986 Seattle Mariners season =

1986 Seattle Mariners
- League: American League
- Division: West
- Ballpark: Kingdome
- City: Seattle, Washington
- Record: 67–95 (.414)
- Divisional place: 7th
- Owner: George Argyros
- General manager: Dick Balderson
- Managers: Chuck Cottier, Marty Martínez (interim), Dick Williams
- Television: KIRO-TV 7
- Radio: KIRO 710 AM (Dave Niehaus, Rick Rizzs, Ken Brett)

The Seattle Mariners 1986 season was their tenth since the franchise creation. They were seventh in the American League (AL) West with a record of 67–95 (.414), the worst record in the league and second-worst in the majors.

At Boston's Fenway Park on Tuesday, April 29, 23-year-old Roger Clemens struck out 20 Mariners, a new major league record. The game was scoreless through six innings, and the Red Sox won 3–1.

Manager Chuck Cottier was fired in May. Marty Martínez managed one game as interim manager before Dick Williams became the manager.

Jim Presley represented the Mariners in the All-Star Game. Mark Langston led the AL with 245 strikeouts, and John Moses tied for the league lead with 18 times caught stealing.

== Offseason ==
- November 1, 1985: Bob Long was released by the Mariners.
- December 12: Darnell Coles was traded by the Mariners to the Detroit Tigers for Rich Monteleone.
- January 18, 1986: Jerry Dybzinski, Steve Fireovid, and Pete Ladd signed as free agents with the Mariners.
- March 31: Dybzinski was released by the Mariners.

== Regular season ==
=== Season standings ===
AL West
Team	W	L	Pct.	GB	Home	Road
California Angels	92	70	.568	—	50‍–‍32	42‍–‍38
Texas Rangers	87	75	.537	5	51‍–‍30	36‍–‍45
Kansas City Royals	76	86	.469	16	45‍–‍36	31‍–‍50
Oakland Athletics	76	86	.469	16	47‍–‍36	29‍–‍50
Chicago White Sox	72	90	.444	20	41‍–‍40	31‍–‍50
Minnesota Twins	71	91	.438	21	43‍–‍38	28‍–‍53
Seattle Mariners	67	95	.414	25	41‍–‍41	26‍–‍54

=== Record vs. opponents ===
1986 American League record Sources:
Team	BAL	BOS	CAL	CWS	CLE	DET	KC	MIL	MIN	NYY	OAK	SEA	TEX	TOR
Baltimore	—	4–9	6–6	9–3	4–9	1–12	6–6	6–7	8–4	5–8	5–7	6–6	5–7	8–5
Boston	9–4	—	5–7	7–5	10–3	7–6	6–6	6–6	10–2	5–8	7–5	8–4	8–4	7–6
California	6–6	7–5	—	7–6	6–6	7–5	8–5	5–7	7–6	7–5	10–3	8–5	8–5	6–6
Chicago	3–9	5–7	6–7	—	5–7	6–6	7–6	5–7	6–7	6–6	7–6	8–5	2–11	6–6
Cleveland	9–4	3–10	6–6	7–5	—	4–9	8–4	8–5	6–6	5–8	10–2	9–3	6–6	3–10–1
Detroit	12–1	6–7	5–7	6–6	9–4	—	5–7	8–5	7–5	6–7	6–6	6–6	7–5	4–9
Kansas City	6–6	6–6	5–8	6–7	4–8	7–5	—	6–6	6–7	4–8	8–5	5–8	8–5	5–7
Milwaukee	7–6	6–6	7–5	7–5	5–8	5–8	6–6	—	4–8	8–5	5–7	6–6	4–8	7–6
Minnesota	4–8	2–10	6–7	7–6	6–6	5–7	7–6	8–4	—	4–8	6–7	6–7	6–7	4–8
New York	8–5	8–5	5–7	6–6	8–5	7–6	8–4	5–8	8–4	—	5–7	8–4	7–5	7–6
Oakland	7–5	5–7	3–10	6–7	2–10	6–6	5–8	7–5	7–6	7–5	—	10–3	3–10	8–4
Seattle	6–6	4–8	5–8	5–8	3–9	6–6	8–5	6–6	7–6	4–8	3–10	—	4–9	6–6
Texas	7–5	4–8	5–8	11–2	6–6	5–7	5–8	8–4	7–6	5–7	10–3	9–4	—	5–7
Toronto	5–8	6–7	6–6	6–6	10–3–1	9–4	7–5	6–7	8–4	6–7	4–8	6–6	7–5	—

=== Notable transactions ===
- May 21, 1986: Terry Bell was traded by Seattle to the Kansas City Royals for Mark Huismann.
- June 26: Received catcher Scott Bradley from the Chicago White Sox. Five days later, the Mariners sent outfielder Iván Calderón to the White Sox.
- August 19: Spike Owen and Dave Henderson were traded by the Mariners to the Boston Red Sox for Rey Quiñones, Mike Brown, Mike Trujillo, and a player to be named later. John Christensen was sent to Seattle on September 25 to complete the trade.

=== Roster ===
1986 Seattle Mariners
Roster
Pitchers: 45 Jim Beattie; 39 Karl Best; 37 Mike Brown; 47,51 Steve Fireovid; 36 Lee Guetterman; 28 Mark Huismann; 46 Pete Ladd; 12 Mark Langston; 52 Paul Mirabella; 25 Mike Moore; 35 Mike Morgan; 30 Edwin Núñez; 31 Jerry Reed; 18 Bill Swift; 43 Mike Trujillo; 34 Milt Wilcox; 40 Matt Young	Catchers: 22 Scott Bradley; 11 Bob Kearney; 5 Dave Valle; 7 Steve Yeager; Infielders: 21 Alvin Davis; 2 Ross Jones; 1 Spike Owen; 44 Ken Phelps; 17 Jim Presley; 51 Rey Quiñones; 3 Domingo Ramos; 19 Harold Reynolds; 20 Gorman Thomas	Outfielders: 9 Barry Bonnell; 29 Phil Bradley; 14 Mickey Brantley; 22 Iván Calderón; 16 Al Cowens; 42 Dave Henderson; 38 Dave Hengel; 26 John Moses; 16 Ricky Nelson; 4,38 Danny Tartabull	Manager: 15 Chuck Cottier; 23 Marty Martínez; 23 Dick Williams; Coaches: 8 Deron Johnson; 6 Jim Mahoney; 10 Marty Martínez; 27 Phil Regan; 4 Phil Roof

== Player stats ==
=== Batting ===
==== Starters by position ====
Note: Pos = Position; G = Games played; AB = At bats; H = Hits; Avg. = Batting average; HR = Home runs; RBI = Runs batted in

Pos	Player	G	AB	H	Avg.	HR	RBI
C	Bob Kearney	81	204	49	.240	6	25
1B	Alvin Davis	135	479	130	.271	18	72
2B	Harold Reynolds	126	445	99	.222	1	24
SS	Spike Owen	112	402	99	.246	0	35
3B	Jim Presley	155	616	163	.265	27	107
LF	Phil Bradley	143	526	163	.310	12	50
CF	John Moses	103	399	102	.256	3	34
RF	Danny Tartabull	137	511	138	.270	25	96
DH	Ken Phelps	125	344	85	.247	24	64

==== Other batters ====
Note: G = Games played; AB = At bats; H = Hits; Avg. = Batting average; RBI = Runs batted in

Player	G	AB	H	Avg.	HR	RBI
Ken Phelps	125	344	85	.247	24	64
Dave Henderson	103	337	93	.276	14	44
Scott Bradley	68	199	60	.302	5	28
Iván Calderón	37	131	31	.237	2	13
Steve Yeager	50	130	27	.208	2	12
Rey Quiñones	36	122	23	.189	0	7
Mickey Brantley	27	102	20	.196	3	7
Domingo Ramos	49	99	18	.182	0	5
Al Cowens	28	82	15	.183	0	6
Dave Hengel	21	63	12	.190	1	6
Dave Valle	22	53	18	.340	5	15
Barry Bonnell	17	51	10	.196	0	4
Ross Jones	11	21	2	.095	0	0
Ricky Nelson	10	12	2	.167	0	1

=== Pitching ===
==== Starting pitchers ====
Note: G = Games pitched; IP = Innings pitched; W = Wins; L = Losses; ERA = Earned run average; SO = Strikeouts

Player	G	IP	W	L	ERA	SO
Mike Moore	38	266.0	11	13	4.36	146
Mark Langston	37	239.1	12	14	4.85	245
Mike Morgan	37	216.1	11	17	4.53	116

==== Other pitchers ====
Note: G = Games pitched; IP = Innings pitched; W = Wins; L = Losses; ERA = Earned run average; SO = Strikeouts

Player	G	IP	W	L	ERA	SO
Bill Swift	29	115.1	2	9	5.46	55
Milt Wilcox	13	55.2	0	8	5.50	26
Mike Trujillo	11	41.1	3	2	2.40	19
Jim Beattie	9	40.1	0	6	6.02	24
Jerry Reed	11	34.2	4	0	3.12	16
Steve Fireovid	10	21.0	2	0	4.29	10
Mike Brown	6	15.2	0	2	7.47	9

==== Relief pitchers ====
Note: G = Games pitched; W = Wins; L = Losses; SV = Saves; ERA = Earned run average; SO = Strikeouts

Player	G	W	L	SV	ERA	SO
Matt Young	65	8	6	13	3.82	82
Pete Ladd	52	8	6	6	3.82	53
Lee Guetterman	41	0	4	0	7.34	38
Mark Huismann	36	3	3	4	3.71	59
Karl Best	26	2	3	1	4.04	23
Edwin Núñez	14	1	2	0	5.82	17
Paul Mirabella	8	0	0	0	8.53	6

== Farm system ==
Level	Team	League	Manager
AAA	Calgary Cannons	Pacific Coast League	Bill Plummer
AA	Chattanooga Lookouts	Southern League	R. J. Harrison
A	Salinas Spurs	California League	Greg Mahlberg
A	Wausau Timbers	Midwest League	Bobby Cuellar
A-Short Season	Bellingham Mariners	Northwest League	Sal Rende

League champions: Bellingham
