= 1986 Cleveland Indians season =

1986 Cleveland Indians
- League: American League
- Division: East
- Ballpark: Cleveland Municipal Stadium
- City: Cleveland, Ohio
- Owners: Estate of F.J. "Steve" O'Neill, Richard Jacobs
- General managers: Joe Klein
- Managers: Pat Corrales
- Television: WUAB
- Radio: WWWE

The 1986 Cleveland Indians season was the 86th for the franchise. On November 13, 1986, the O'Neill estate would sell the team to Richard Jacobs, who would run the team with his brother David for the next decade.

== Offseason ==
- December 10, 1985: George Vukovich was purchased from the Indians by the Seibu Lions (Japan Pacific).
- January 7, 1986: Roy Smith and Ramón Romero were traded by the Indians to the Minnesota Twins for Ken Schrom and Bryan Oelkers.
- January 14, 1986: Troy Neel was drafted by the Indians in the 9th round of the 1986 Major League Baseball draft. Player signed May 5, 1986.
- January 23, 1986: Fran Mullins was purchased by the Indians from the San Francisco Giants.
- February 8, 1986: Dickie Noles was signed as a free agent by the Indians.
- February 10, 1986: Butch Benton was released by the Indians.
- February 25, 1986: Jim Kern was signed as a free agent by the Indians.

== Regular season ==
=== Season standings ===
AL East
Team	W	L	Pct.	GB	Home	Road
Boston Red Sox	95	66	.590	—	51‍–‍30	44‍–‍36
New York Yankees	90	72	.556	5½	41‍–‍39	49‍–‍33
Detroit Tigers	87	75	.537	8½	49‍–‍32	38‍–‍43
Toronto Blue Jays	86	76	.531	9½	42‍–‍39	44‍–‍37
Cleveland Indians	84	78	.519	11½	45‍–‍35	39‍–‍43
Milwaukee Brewers	77	84	.478	18	41‍–‍39	36‍–‍45
Baltimore Orioles	73	89	.451	22½	37‍–‍42	36‍–‍47

=== Record vs. opponents ===
1986 American League record Sources:
Team	BAL	BOS	CAL	CWS	CLE	DET	KC	MIL	MIN	NYY	OAK	SEA	TEX	TOR
Baltimore	—	4–9	6–6	9–3	4–9	1–12	6–6	6–7	8–4	5–8	5–7	6–6	5–7	8–5
Boston	9–4	—	5–7	7–5	10–3	7–6	6–6	6–6	10–2	5–8	7–5	8–4	8–4	7–6
California	6–6	7–5	—	7–6	6–6	7–5	8–5	5–7	7–6	7–5	10–3	8–5	8–5	6–6
Chicago	3–9	5–7	6–7	—	5–7	6–6	7–6	5–7	6–7	6–6	7–6	8–5	2–11	6–6
Cleveland	9–4	3–10	6–6	7–5	—	4–9	8–4	8–5	6–6	5–8	10–2	9–3	6–6	3–10–1
Detroit	12–1	6–7	5–7	6–6	9–4	—	5–7	8–5	7–5	6–7	6–6	6–6	7–5	4–9
Kansas City	6–6	6–6	5–8	6–7	4–8	7–5	—	6–6	6–7	4–8	8–5	5–8	8–5	5–7
Milwaukee	7–6	6–6	7–5	7–5	5–8	5–8	6–6	—	4–8	8–5	5–7	6–6	4–8	7–6
Minnesota	4–8	2–10	6–7	7–6	6–6	5–7	7–6	8–4	—	4–8	6–7	6–7	6–7	4–8
New York	8–5	8–5	5–7	6–6	8–5	7–6	8–4	5–8	8–4	—	5–7	8–4	7–5	7–6
Oakland	7–5	5–7	3–10	6–7	2–10	6–6	5–8	7–5	7–6	7–5	—	10–3	3–10	8–4
Seattle	6–6	4–8	5–8	5–8	3–9	6–6	8–5	6–6	7–6	4–8	3–10	—	4–9	6–6
Texas	7–5	4–8	5–8	11–2	6–6	5–7	5–8	8–4	7–6	5–7	10–3	9–4	—	5–7
Toronto	5–8	6–7	6–6	6–6	10–3–1	9–4	7–5	6–7	8–4	6–7	4–8	6–6	7–5	—

=== Notable transactions ===
- March 28, 1986: Dave Von Ohlen was released by the Indians.
- April 1, 1986: Jerry Willard was released by the Indians.
- June 2, 1986: Greg Swindell was drafted by the Indians in the 1st round (2nd pick) of the 1986 Major League Baseball draft. Player signed July 31, 1986.
- June 17, 1986: Jim Kern was released by the Indians.
- June 20, 1986: Neal Heaton was traded by the Indians to the Minnesota Twins for John Butcher.

=== Opening Day Lineup ===
Opening Day Starters
#	Name	Position
2	Brett Butler	CF
30	Joe Carter	RF
14	Julio Franco	SS
29	Andre Thornton	DH
26	Brook Jacoby	3B
10	Pat Tabler	1B
4	Tony Bernazard	2B
27	Mel Hall	LF
6	Andy Allanson	C
18	Ken Schrom	P

=== Roster ===
1986 Cleveland Indians
Roster
Pitchers: 43 Scott Bailes; 38 John Butcher; 13 Ernie Camacho; 49 Tom Candiotti; 36 Jamie Easterly; 44 Neal Heaton; 46 Doug Jones; 46 Jim Kern; 35 Phil Niekro; 48 Dickie Noles; 33 Bryan Oelkers; 53 Reggie Ritter; 34 José Román; 18 Ken Schrom; 37 Don Schulze; 21 Greg Swindell; 44 Frank Wills; 42 Rich Yett	Catchers: 6 Andy Allanson; 23 Chris Bando; Infielders: 16 Jay Bell; 4 Tony Bernazard; 14 Julio Franco; 26 Brook Jacoby; 22 Fran Mullins; 15 Dan Rohn; 10 Pat Tabler; 29 Andre Thornton	Outfielders: 2 Brett Butler; 30 Joe Carter; 8 Carmen Castillo; 12 Dave Clark; 27 Mel Hall; 20 Otis Nixon; 28 Cory Snyder; 24 Eddie Williams	Manager: 7 Pat Corrales; Coaches: 1 Jack Aker (Pitching); 25 Bobby Bonds (Hitting/First Base); 32 Doc Edwards (Bullpen); 45 Johnny Goryl (Third Base); 47 Fred Koenig

== Player stats ==
=== Batting ===
Note: G = Games played; AB = At bats; R = Runs scored; H = Hits; 2B = Doubles; 3B = Triples; HR = Home runs; RBI = Runs batted in; AVG = Batting average; SB = Stolen bases

Player	G	AB	R	H	2B	3B	HR	RBI	AVG	SB
Andy Allanson	101	293	30	66	7	3	1	29	.225	10
Chris Bando	92	254	28	68	9	0	2	26	,268	0
Jay Bell	5	14	3	5	2	0	1	4	.357	0
Tony Bernazard	146	562	88	169	28	4	17	73	.301	17
Brett Butler	161	587	92	163	17	14	4	51	.278	32
Joe Carter	162	663	108	200	36	9	29	121	.302	29
Carmelo Castillo	85	205	34	57	9	0	8	32	.278	2
Dave Clark	18	58	10	16	1	0	3	9	.276	1
Julio Franco	149	599	80	183	30	5	10	74	.306	10
Mel Hall	140	442	68	131	29	2	18	77	.296	6
Brook Jacoby	158	583	83	168	30	4	17	80	.288	2
Fran Mullins	28	40	3	7	4	0	0	5	.175	0
Otis Nixon	105	95	33	25	4	1	0	8	.263	23
Dan Rohn	6	10	1	2	0	0	0	2	.200	0
Cory Snyder	103	416	58	113	21	1	24	69	.272	2
Pat Tabler	130	473	61	154	29	2	6	48	.326	3
Andre Thornton	120	401	49	92	14	0	17	66	.229	4
Eddie Williams	5	7	2	1	0	0	0	1	.143	0
Team totals	162	5702	831	1620	270	45	157	775	.284	141

=== Pitching ===
Note: W = Wins; L = Losses; ERA = Earned run average; G = Games pitched; GS = Games started; SV = Saves; IP = Innings pitched; H = Hits allowed; R = Runs allowed; ER = Earned runs allowed; BB = Walks allowed; K = Strikeouts

Player	W	L	ERA	G	GS	SV	IP	H	R	ER	BB	K
Scott Bailes	10	10	4.95	62	10	7	112.2	123	70	62	43	60
John Butcher	1	5	6.93	13	8	0	50.2	86	43	39	13	16
Ernie Camacho	2	4	4.08	51	0	20	57.1	60	26	26	31	36
Tom Candiotti	16	12	3.57	36	34	0	252.1	234	112	100	106	167
Jamie Easterly	0	2	7.64	13	0	0	17.2	27	16	15	12	9
Neal Heaton	3	6	4.24	12	12	0	74.1	73	42	35	34	24
Doug Jones	1	0	2.50	11	0	1	18.0	18	5	5	6	12
Jim Kern	1	1	7.90	16	0	0	27.1	34	28	24	23	11
Phil Niekro	11	11	4.32	34	32	0	210.1	241	126	101	95	81
Dickie Noles	3	2	5.10	32	0	0	54.2	56	33	31	30	32
Bryan Oelkers	3	3	4.70	35	4	1	69.0	70	38	36	40	33
Reggie Ritter	0	0	6.30	5	0	0	10.0	14	10	7	4	6
Jose Roman	1	2	6.55	6	5	0	22.0	23	20	16	17	9
Ken Schrom	14	7	4.54	34	33	0	206.0	217	118	104	49	87
Don Schulze	4	4	5.00	19	13	0	84.2	88	48	47	34	33
Greg Swindell	5	2	4.23	9	9	0	61.2	57	35	29	15	46
Frank Wills	4	4	4.91	26	0	4	40.1	43	23	22	16	32
Rich Yett	5	3	5.15	39	3	1	76.2	84	48	45	37	50
Team totals	84	78	4.58	162	162	34	1447.2	1548	841	736	605	744

== Game log ==
Legend
Indians Win	Indians Loss	Game postponed

1986 Game Log
April: 11-8 (Home: 0-0, Road: 0-0)

#	Date	Opponent	Score	Win	Loss	Save	Attendance	Record
1	April 7	@ Orioles	6-4	Schrom (1–0)	Flanagan (0–1)	Camacho (1)	52,292	1–0
2	April 9	@ Orioles	4-3	Aase (1–0)	Bailes (0–1)		13,039	1-1
3	April 10	@ Orioles	5-1	Dixon (1–0)	Kern (0–1)	Bordi (1)	12,933	1–2
4	April 11	Tigers	7-2	Terrell (1–0)	Niekro (0–1)		32,441	1–3
5	April 12	Tigers	6-2	Schrom (2–0)	Morris (1-1)	Camacho (2)	17,426	2–3
6	April 13	Tigers	8-2	Bailes (1-1)	Tanana (0–1)		10,463	3-3
7	April 15	Yankees	6-2	Niekro (1–0)	Candiotti (0–1)	Fisher (1)	3,223	3–4
—	April 16	Yankees	Postponed					
8	April 17	Yankees	6-4	Niekro (1-1)	Tewksbury (1-1)	Bailes (1)	5,602	4-4
9	April 18	@ Tigers	6-1	Tanana (1-1)	Schrom (2–1)		20,703	4–5
10	April 19	@ Tigers	8-6	Bailes (2–1)	Petry (1–2)	Camacho (3)	19,216	5-5
—	April 20	@ Tigers	Postponed					
11	April 21	Orioles	7-0	Candiotti (1-1)	Flanagan (1–2)		3,012	6–5
12	April 22	Orioles	5-2	Dixon (2–0)	Niekro (1–2)	Aase (4)	3,004	6-6
13	April 23	Orioles	5-1	Schrom (3–1)	McGregor (1–2)	Bailes (2)	3,788	7–6
14	April 24	@ Yankees	2-1	Guidry (3–0)	Heaton (0–1)		17,299	7-7

May: 12-16 (Home: 0-0, Road: 0-0)

#	Date	Opponent	Score	Win	Loss	Save	Attendance	Record

June: 15-11 (Home: 0-0, Road: 0-0)

#	Date	Opponent	Score	Win	Loss	Save	Attendance	Record

July: 15-12 (Home: 0-0, Road: 0-0)

#	Date	Opponent	Score	Win	Loss	Save	Attendance	Record

August: 12-19 (Home: 0-0, Road: 0-0)

#	Date	Opponent	Score	Win	Loss	Save	Attendance	Record

September: 15-12 (Home: 0-0, Road: 0-0)

#	Date	Opponent	Score	Win	Loss	Save	Attendance	Record

October: 4-0 (Home: 0-0, Road: 0-0)

#	Date	Opponent	Score	Win	Loss	Save	Attendance	Record

== Awards and honors ==
All-Star Game

== Farm system ==
Level	Team	League	Manager
AAA	Maine Guides	International League	Jim Napier
AA	Waterbury Indians	Eastern League	Orlando Gómez
A	Waterloo Indians	Midwest League	Steve Swisher
A-Short Season	Batavia Trojans	New York–Penn League	Glenn Adams

LEAGUE CHAMPIONS: Waterloo
