= 1986 Minnesota Twins season =

1986 Minnesota Twins
- League: American League
- Division: West
- Ballpark: Hubert H. Humphrey Metrodome
- City: Minneapolis, Minnesota
- Record: 71–91 (.438)
- Divisional place: 6th
- Owners: Carl Pohlad
- General managers: Andy MacPhail
- Managers: Ray Miller, Tom Kelly
- Television: KMSP-TV (Bob Kurtz, Harmon Killebrew)
- Radio: 830 WCCO AM (Herb Carneal, Joe Angel)

The 1986 Minnesota Twins season was the 26th season for the Minnesota Twins franchise in the Twin Cities of Minnesota, their 5th season at Hubert H. Humphrey Metrodome and the 86th overall in the American League.

The Twins finished at 71–91, sixth in the American League West, 21 games behind the eventual American League West runner-up California Angels . 1,255,453 fans attended Twins games, the second lowest total in the American League. Pitcher Bert Blyleven made a prediction on Fan Appreciation Day on October 3, saying that if the team came together as a unit and signed some other good players, they could potentially bring a World Series championship to Minnesota. That prediction proved accurate the next year.

== Offseason ==
- December 20, 1985: Rick Lysander was released by the Twins.
- January 7, 1986: Ken Schrom and Bryan Oelkers were traded by the Twins to the Cleveland Indians for Roy Smith and Ramón Romero.
- January 14, 1986: Jarvis Brown was drafted by the Twins in the 1st round (9th pick) of the 1986 Major League Baseball draft. Player signed May 23, 1986.
- January 16, 1986: Tim Teufel and Pat Crosby (minors) were traded by the Twins to the New York Mets for Billy Beane, Joe Klink and Bill Latham.
- January 16, 1986: Dave Engel was traded by the Minnesota Twins to the Detroit Tigers for Chris Pittaro and Alejandro Sánchez.
- March 31, 1986: Mike Hart was traded by the Twins to the Baltimore Orioles for Ben Bianchi (minors), Steve Padia (minors), and a player to be named later. The Orioles completed the deal by sending Jeff Hubbard (minors) to the Twins on April 23.

== Regular season ==
On May 30, Roy Smalley III homered from both sides of the plate, the first Twin to do so.

Only one Twins player made the All-Star Game: outfielder Kirby Puckett.

On August 1, Puckett hit for the cycle, the only time he'd do so in his major league career. Going triple, double, single, homer, he became the seventh Twin in history to cycle. On the same night, pitcher Bert Blyleven struck out Oakland's Mike Davis to notch his 3000th strikeout. Only eight other pitchers had reached that plateau.

After a disappointing start, manager Ray Miller was replaced by Tom Kelly on September 12.

Greg Gagne of the Twins hit two inside-the-park home runs in one game on October 4, against the Chicago White Sox. Pitcher Bert Blyleven was on the mound for the Twins; the last time a batter had hit two inside-the-park homers in one game, it was Dick Allen of the White Sox on July 31, 1972, and his homers were hit off Blyleven.

Also on October 4, Blyleven allowed his 50th home run of the season (to Chicago's Daryl Boston) to set a major league record. (When he served up 46 in 1987, he set another record with 96 homers allowed over consecutive seasons.)

=== Offense ===
Kirby Puckett switched from leadoff to third in the batting order, blasted 31 HR, drove in 96 runs and scored 119. Kent Hrbek hit .267 with 29 HR and 91 RBI. Tom Brunansky hit 23 HR and 75 RBI. Gary Gaetti hit .287 with 34 HR and 108 RBI. With Roy Smalley Jr.'s 20 home runs, five players reached 20 homers this season, the first time that happened since six players topped 20 in 1964.

=== Pitching ===
The Twins had three solid starting pitchers: Frank Viola (16–13), Bert Blyleven (17–14), and Mike Smithson (13–14). Reliever Keith Atherton had 10 saves.

=== Defense ===
Third baseman Gary Gaetti and center fielder Kirby Puckett each won their first Gold Glove Award. They were the first Twins to win a gold glove since Jim Kaat in 1973.

=== Season standings ===
AL West
Team	W	L	Pct.	GB	Home	Road
California Angels	92	70	.568	—	50‍–‍32	42‍–‍38
Texas Rangers	87	75	.537	5	51‍–‍30	36‍–‍45
Kansas City Royals	76	86	.469	16	45‍–‍36	31‍–‍50
Oakland Athletics	76	86	.469	16	47‍–‍36	29‍–‍50
Chicago White Sox	72	90	.444	20	41‍–‍40	31‍–‍50
Minnesota Twins	71	91	.438	21	43‍–‍38	28‍–‍53
Seattle Mariners	67	95	.414	25	41‍–‍41	26‍–‍54

=== Record vs. opponents ===
1986 American League record Sources:
Team	BAL	BOS	CAL	CWS	CLE	DET	KC	MIL	MIN	NYY	OAK	SEA	TEX	TOR
Baltimore	—	4–9	6–6	9–3	4–9	1–12	6–6	6–7	8–4	5–8	5–7	6–6	5–7	8–5
Boston	9–4	—	5–7	7–5	10–3	7–6	6–6	6–6	10–2	5–8	7–5	8–4	8–4	7–6
California	6–6	7–5	—	7–6	6–6	7–5	8–5	5–7	7–6	7–5	10–3	8–5	8–5	6–6
Chicago	3–9	5–7	6–7	—	5–7	6–6	7–6	5–7	6–7	6–6	7–6	8–5	2–11	6–6
Cleveland	9–4	3–10	6–6	7–5	—	4–9	8–4	8–5	6–6	5–8	10–2	9–3	6–6	3–10–1
Detroit	12–1	6–7	5–7	6–6	9–4	—	5–7	8–5	7–5	6–7	6–6	6–6	7–5	4–9
Kansas City	6–6	6–6	5–8	6–7	4–8	7–5	—	6–6	6–7	4–8	8–5	5–8	8–5	5–7
Milwaukee	7–6	6–6	7–5	7–5	5–8	5–8	6–6	—	4–8	8–5	5–7	6–6	4–8	7–6
Minnesota	4–8	2–10	6–7	7–6	6–6	5–7	7–6	8–4	—	4–8	6–7	6–7	6–7	4–8
New York	8–5	8–5	5–7	6–6	8–5	7–6	8–4	5–8	8–4	—	5–7	8–4	7–5	7–6
Oakland	7–5	5–7	3–10	6–7	2–10	6–6	5–8	7–5	7–6	7–5	—	10–3	3–10	8–4
Seattle	6–6	4–8	5–8	5–8	3–9	6–6	8–5	6–6	7–6	4–8	3–10	—	4–9	6–6
Texas	7–5	4–8	5–8	11–2	6–6	5–7	5–8	8–4	7–6	5–7	10–3	9–4	—	5–7
Toronto	5–8	6–7	6–6	6–6	10–3–1	9–4	7–5	6–7	8–4	6–7	4–8	6–6	7–5	—

=== Notable transactions ===
- April 8, 1986: Houston Jiménez was released by the Twins.
- May 20, 1986: Keith Atherton was traded by the Oakland Athletics to the Minnesota Twins for a player to be named later and cash. The Minnesota Twins sent Eric Broersma (minors) (May 23, 1986) to the Oakland Athletics to complete the trade.
- June 2, 1986: Derek Parks was drafted by the Twins in the 1st round (10th pick) of the 1986 Major League Baseball draft.
- June 20, 1986: John Butcher was traded by the Twins to the Cleveland Indians for Neal Heaton.

=== Roster ===
1986 Minnesota Twins
Roster
Pitchers: 30 Juan Agosto; 49 Allan Anderson; 22 Keith Atherton; 28 Bert Blyleven; 17 Dennis Burtt; 32 John Butcher; 39 Ron Davis; 23 Pete Filson; 37 Ray Fontenot; 39 George Frazier; 32 Neal Heaton; 23 Roy Lee Jackson; 35 Bill Latham; 33 Frank Pastore; 36 Mark Portugal; 19 Roy Smith; 48 Mike Smithson; 16 Frank Viola	Catchers: 15 Tim Laudner; 10 Jeff Reed; 12 Mark Salas; Infielders: 1 Alvaro Espinoza; 8 Gary Gaetti; 31 Greg Gagne; 14 Kent Hrbek; 4 Steve Lombardozzi; 2 Chris Pittaro; 5 Roy Smalley; 38 Ron Washington	Outfielders: 20 Billy Beane; 24 Tom Brunansky; 25 Randy Bush; 27 Mark Davidson; 9 Mickey Hatcher; 34 Kirby Puckett; 18 Alejandro Sánchez; Other batters: 21 Andre David; 11 Alvis Woods	Manager: 41 Tom Kelly; 44 Ray Miller; Coaches: 41 Tom Kelly; 6 Tony Oliva; 43 Rick Stelmaszek; 42 Dick Such; 45 Wayne Terwilliger

== Player stats ==
= Indicates team leader

=== Batting ===
==== Starters by position ====
Note: Pos = Position; G = Games played; AB = At bats; H = Hits; Avg. = Batting average; HR = Home runs; RBI = Runs batted in

Pos	Player	G	AB	H	Avg.	HR	RBI
C	Mark Salas	91	258	60	.233	8	33
1B	Kent Hrbek	149	550	147	.267	29	91
2B	Steve Lombardozzi	156	453	103	.227	8	33
3B	Gary Gaetti	157	596	171	.287	34	108
SS	Greg Gagne	156	472	118	.250	12	54
LF	Randy Bush	130	357	96	.269	7	45
CF	Kirby Puckett	161	680	223	.328	31	96
RF	Tom Brunansky	157	593	152	.256	23	75
DH	Roy Smalley	143	459	113	.246	20	57

==== Other batters ====
Note: G = Games played; AB = At bats; H = Hits; Avg. = Batting average; HR = Home runs; RBI = Runs batted in

Player	G	AB	H	Avg.	HR	RBI
Mickey Hatcher	115	317	88	.278	3	32
Tim Laudner	76	193	46	.244	10	29
Billy Beane	80	183	39	.213	3	15
Jeff Reed	68	165	39	.236	2	9
Ron Washington	48	74	19	.257	4	11
Mark Davidson	36	68	8	.118	0	2
Alvaro Espinoza	37	42	9	.214	0	1
Al Woods	23	28	9	.321	2	8
Chris Pittaro	11	21	2	.095	0	0
Alejandro Sánchez	8	16	2	.125	0	1
Andre David	5	5	1	.200	0	0

=== Pitching ===
==== Starting pitchers ====
Note: G = Games pitched; IP = Innings pitched; W = Wins; L = Losses; ERA = Earned run average; SO = Strikeouts

Player	G	IP	W	L	ERA	SO
Bert Blyleven	36	271.2	17	14	4.01	215
Frank Viola	37	245.2	16	13	4.51	191
Mike Smithson	34	198.0	13	14	4.77	114
Neal Heaton	21	124.1	4	9	3.98	66

==== Other pitchers ====
Note: G = Games pitched; IP = Innings pitched; W = Wins; L = Losses; ERA = Earned run average; SO = Strikeouts

Player	G	IP	W	L	ERA	SO
Mark Portugal	27	112.2	6	10	4.31	67
Allan Anderson	21	84.1	3	6	5.55	51
John Butcher	16	70.0	0	3	6.30	29
Bill Latham	7	16.0	0	1	7.31	8

==== Relief pitchers ====
Note: G = Games pitched; W = Wins; L = Losses; SV = Saves; ERA = Earned run average; SO = Strikeouts

Player	G	W	L	SV	ERA	SO
Keith Atherton	47	5	8	10	3.75	59
Ron Davis	36	2	6	2	9.08	30
Frank Pastore	33	3	1	2	4.01	18
Roy Lee Jackson	28	0	1	1	3.86	32
Juan Agosto	17	1	2	1	8.85	9
George Frazier	15	1	1	6	4.39	25
Ray Fontenot	15	0	0	0	9.92	10
Roy Smith	5	0	2	0	6.97	8
Pete Filson	4	0	0	0	5.68	4
Dennis Burtt	3	0	0	0	31.50	1

== Farm system ==
Level	Team	League	Manager
AAA	Toledo Mud Hens	International League	Charlie Manuel
AA	Orlando Twins	Southern League	George Mitterwald
A	Visalia Oaks	California League	Danny Schmitz
A	Kenosha Twins	Midwest League	Don Leppert
Rookie	Elizabethton Twins	Appalachian League	Fred Waters
