= 1986 Texas Rangers season =

1986 Texas Rangers
- League: American League
- Division: West
- Ballpark: Arlington Stadium
- City: Arlington, Texas
- Record: 87–75 (.537)
- Divisional place: 2nd
- Owners: Eddie Chiles
- General managers: Tom Grieve
- Managers: Bobby Valentine
- Television: KTVT (Bob Carpenter, Steve Busby); HSE (Bob Carpenter, Norm Hitzges, Merle Harmon)
- Radio: WBAP (Eric Nadel, Mark Holtz )

The 1986 Texas Rangers season was the 26th of the Texas Rangers franchise overall, their 15th in Arlington as the Rangers, and the 15th season at Arlington Stadium. The Rangers finished second in the American League West with a record of 87 wins and 75 losses.

Michael Stone was President of the Rangers and promoted Tom Grieve to General Manager.

== Offseason ==
- November 9, 1985: Chris Welsh was released by the Rangers.
- November 25, 1985: Wayne Tolleson and Dave Schmidt were traded by the Rangers to the Chicago White Sox for Ed Correa, Scott Fletcher and a player to be named later. The White Sox completed the trade by sending José Mota to the Rangers on December 11.
- December 20, 1985: Ellis Valentine was released by the Rangers.
- December 20, 1985: Dickie Noles was released by the Rangers.

== Regular season ==
- September 13, 1986: Rubén Sierra became the youngest player in history to hit home runs from both sides of the plate in one game. This was accomplished against the Minnesota Twins.
- Ed Correa set a club record for most wins by a rookie pitcher.
- In his rookie year, Pete Incaviglia tied the club record for most home runs in a season.

=== Season standings ===
AL West
Team	W	L	Pct.	GB	Home	Road
California Angels	92	70	.568	—	50‍–‍32	42‍–‍38
Texas Rangers	87	75	.537	5	51‍–‍30	36‍–‍45
Kansas City Royals	76	86	.469	16	45‍–‍36	31‍–‍50
Oakland Athletics	76	86	.469	16	47‍–‍36	29‍–‍50
Chicago White Sox	72	90	.444	20	41‍–‍40	31‍–‍50
Minnesota Twins	71	91	.438	21	43‍–‍38	28‍–‍53
Seattle Mariners	67	95	.414	25	41‍–‍41	26‍–‍54

=== Record vs. opponents ===
1986 American League record Sources:
Team	BAL	BOS	CAL	CWS	CLE	DET	KC	MIL	MIN	NYY	OAK	SEA	TEX	TOR
Baltimore	—	4–9	6–6	9–3	4–9	1–12	6–6	6–7	8–4	5–8	5–7	6–6	5–7	8–5
Boston	9–4	—	5–7	7–5	10–3	7–6	6–6	6–6	10–2	5–8	7–5	8–4	8–4	7–6
California	6–6	7–5	—	7–6	6–6	7–5	8–5	5–7	7–6	7–5	10–3	8–5	8–5	6–6
Chicago	3–9	5–7	6–7	—	5–7	6–6	7–6	5–7	6–7	6–6	7–6	8–5	2–11	6–6
Cleveland	9–4	3–10	6–6	7–5	—	4–9	8–4	8–5	6–6	5–8	10–2	9–3	6–6	3–10–1
Detroit	12–1	6–7	5–7	6–6	9–4	—	5–7	8–5	7–5	6–7	6–6	6–6	7–5	4–9
Kansas City	6–6	6–6	5–8	6–7	4–8	7–5	—	6–6	6–7	4–8	8–5	5–8	8–5	5–7
Milwaukee	7–6	6–6	7–5	7–5	5–8	5–8	6–6	—	4–8	8–5	5–7	6–6	4–8	7–6
Minnesota	4–8	2–10	6–7	7–6	6–6	5–7	7–6	8–4	—	4–8	6–7	6–7	6–7	4–8
New York	8–5	8–5	5–7	6–6	8–5	7–6	8–4	5–8	8–4	—	5–7	8–4	7–5	7–6
Oakland	7–5	5–7	3–10	6–7	2–10	6–6	5–8	7–5	7–6	7–5	—	10–3	3–10	8–4
Seattle	6–6	4–8	5–8	5–8	3–9	6–6	8–5	6–6	7–6	4–8	3–10	—	4–9	6–6
Texas	7–5	4–8	5–8	11–2	6–6	5–7	5–8	8–4	7–6	5–7	10–3	9–4	—	5–7
Toronto	5–8	6–7	6–6	6–6	10–3–1	9–4	7–5	6–7	8–4	6–7	4–8	6–6	7–5	—

=== Notable transactions ===
- June 2, 1986: John Barfield was drafted by the Texas Rangers in the 11th round of the 1986 amateur draft. Player signed June 5, 1986.
- June 2, 1986: Wayne Rosenthal was drafted by the Rangers in the 24th round of the 1986 Major League Baseball draft.
- September 30, 1986: Randy Kramer was traded by the Rangers to the Pittsburgh Pirates for Jeff Zaske.

=== Roster ===
1986 Texas Rangers roster
Roster
Pitchers: 43 Kevin Brown; 18 Ed Correa; 23 José Guzmán; 27 Greg Harris; 45 Dwayne Henry; 49 Charlie Hough; 46 Mike Loynd; 42 Mickey Mahler; 16 Mike Mason; 38 Ron Meridith; 34 Dale Mohorcic; 30 Dave Rozema; 40 Jeff Russell; 28 Mitch Williams; 48 Bobby Witt; 24 Ricky Wright	Catchers: 7 Orlando Mercado; 12 Geno Petralli; 17 Darrell Porter; 4 Don Slaught; Infielders: 8 Jerry Browne; 22 Steve Buechele; 1 Scott Fletcher; 11 Toby Harrah; 20 Jeff Kunkel; 9 Pete O'Brien; 15 Larry Parrish; 5 Mike Stanley; 19 Curtis Wilkerson	Outfielders: 51 Bob Brower; 5,29 Pete Incaviglia; 6 Bob Jones; 0 Oddibe McDowell; 44 Tom Paciorek; 3 Rubén Sierra; 32 Gary Ward; 26 George Wright	Manager: 2 Bobby Valentine; Coaches: 41 Joe Ferguson; 14 Tim Foli; 35 Tom House; 10 Art Howe; 31 Tom Robson

== Game log ==
=== Regular season ===
Legend
Rangers Win	Rangers Loss	Game postponed	Eliminated from playoff spot

1986 regular season game log: 87–75 (Home: 51–30; Away: 36–45)
April: 9–10 (Home: 4–7; Away: 5–3)

#	Date	Time (CT)	Opponent	Score	Win	Loss	Save	Time of Game	Attendance	Record	Box Streak

May: 15–13 (Home: 9–7; Away: 6–6)

#	Date	Time (CT)	Opponent	Score	Win	Loss	Save	Time of Game	Attendance	Record	Box Streak

June: 16–13 (Home: 8–4; Away: 8–9)

#	Date	Time (CT)	Opponent	Score	Win	Loss	Save	Time of Game	Attendance	Record	Box Streak

July: 12–14 (Home: 10–5; Away: 2–9)

#	Date	Time (CT)	Opponent	Score	Win	Loss	Save	Time of Game	Attendance	Record	Box Streak

August: 17–12 (Home: 9–3; Away: 8–9)

#	Date	Time (CT)	Opponent	Score	Win	Loss	Save	Time of Game	Attendance	Record	Box Streak

September: 15–11 (Home: 7–3; Away: 8–8)

#	Date	Time (CT)	Opponent	Score	Win	Loss	Save	Time of Game	Attendance	Record	Box Streak

October: 3–2 (Home: 3–2; Away: 0–0)

#	Date	Time (CT)	Opponent	Score	Win	Loss	Save	Time of Game	Attendance	Record	Box Streak

== Player stats ==
= Indicates team leader

=== Batting ===
==== Starters by position ====
Note: Pos = Position; G = Games played; AB = At bats; H = Hits; Avg. = Batting average; HR = Home runs; RBI = Runs batted in

Pos	Player	G	AB	H	Avg.	HR	RBI
C	Don Slaught	95	314	83	.264	13	46
1B	Pete O'Brien	156	551	160	.290	23	90
2B	Toby Harrah	95	289	63	.218	7	41
SS	Scott Fletcher	147	530	159	.300	3	50
3B	Steve Buechele	153	461	112	.243	18	54
LF	Gary Ward	105	380	120	.316	5	51
CF	Oddibe McDowell	154	572	152	.266	18	49
RF	Pete Incaviglia	153	540	135	.250	30	88
DH	Larry Parrish	129	464	128	.276	28	94

==== Other batters ====
Note: G = Games played; AB = At bats; H = Hits; Avg. = Batting average; HR = Home runs; RBI = Runs batted in

Player	G	AB	H	Avg.	HR	RBI
Rubén Sierra	113	382	101	.264	16	55
Curt Wilkerson	110	236	56	.237	0	15
Tom Paciorek	88	213	61	.286	4	22
Darrell Porter	68	155	41	.265	12	29
Geno Petralli	69	137	35	.255	2	18
George Wright	49	106	23	.217	2	7
Orlando Mercado	46	102	24	.235	1	7
Mike Stanley	15	30	10	.333	1	1
Jerry Browne	12	24	10	.417	0	3
Bob Jones	13	21	2	.095	0	3
Jeff Kunkel	8	13	3	.231	1	2
Bob Brower	21	9	1	.111	0	0

=== Pitching ===
==== Starting pitchers ====
Note: G = Games pitched; IP = Innings pitched; W = Wins; L = Losses; ERA = Earned run average; SO = Strikeouts

Player	G	IP	W	L	ERA	SO
Charlie Hough	33	230.1	17	10	3.79	146
Ed Correa	32	202.0	12	14	4.23	189
José Guzmán	29	172.0	9	15	4.54	87
Bobby Witt	31	158.0	11	9	5.48	174
Mike Mason	27	135.0	7	3	4.33	85
Kevin Brown	1	5.0	1	0	3.60	4

==== Other pitchers ====
Note: G = Games pitched; IP = Innings pitched; W = Wins; L = Losses; ERA = Earned run average; SO = Strikeouts

Player	G	IP	W	L	ERA	SO
Mickey Mahler	29	63.0	0	2	4.14	28
Mike Loynd	9	42.0	2	2	5.36	33

==== Relief pitchers ====
Note: G = Games pitched; IP = Innings pitched; W = Wins; L = Losses; SV = Saves; ERA = Earned run average; SO = Strikeouts

Player	G	IP	W	L	SV	ERA	SO
Greg A. Harris	73	111.0	10	8	20	2.83	95
Mitch Williams	80	98.0	8	6	8	3.58	90
Dale Mohorcic	58	79.0	2	4	7	2.51	29
Jeff Russell	37	82.0	5	2	2	3.40	54
Ricky Wright	21	39.1	1	0	0	5.03	23
Dwayne Henry	19	19.1	1	0	0	4.66	17
Dave Rozema	6	10.2	0	0	0	5.91	3
Ron Meridith	5	3.0	1	0	0	3.00	2

== Farm system ==
Level	Team	League	Manager
AAA	Oklahoma City 89ers	American Association	Dave Oliver
AA	Tulsa Drillers	Texas League	Bill Stearns
A	Salem Redbirds	Carolina League	Mike Bucci
A	Daytona Beach Admirals	Florida State League	Chino Cadahia
Rookie	GCL Rangers	Gulf Coast League	Rudy Jaramillo
