= 1986 Baltimore Orioles season =

Major League Baseball season

1986 Baltimore Orioles
- League: American League
- Division: East
- Ballpark: Memorial Stadium
- City: Baltimore, Maryland
- Record: 73–89 (.451)
- Divisional place: 7th
- Owners: Edward Bennett Williams
- General managers: Hank Peters
- Managers: Earl Weaver
- Television: WMAR-TV (Chuck Thompson, Brooks Robinson); Home Team Sports (Rex Barney, Mel Proctor, John Lowenstein, Tom Davis)
- Radio: WFBR (Jon Miller, Tom Marr)

The 1986 Baltimore Orioles season was the 86th season in Baltimore Orioles franchise history, the 33rd in Baltimore, and the 33rd at Memorial Stadium. The Orioles finished seventh in the American League East with a record of 73 wins and 89 losses. On August 5, the Orioles were in second place with a record of 59–47, just 2.5 games out of first place, but the Orioles would lose 42 of their final 56 games to finish in last place in the AL East.

== Offseason ==
- October 9, 1985: Joe Nolan was released by the Orioles.
- December 12, 1985: Gary Roenicke and a player to be named later were traded by the Orioles to the New York Yankees for Rex Hudler and Rich Bordi. The Orioles completed the deal by sending Leo Hernández to the Yankees on December 16.
- January 14, 1986: Rafael Bournigal was drafted by the Orioles in the 10th round of the 1986 Major League Baseball draft, but did not sign.
- January 23, 1986: Dan Ford was released by the Orioles.
- February 20, 1986: Luis DeLeón was signed as a free agent by the Orioles.
- March 23, 1986: Mike Kinnunen was signed as a free agent by the Orioles.
- March 31, 1986: Ben Bianchi (minors), Steve Padia (minors), and a player to be named later were traded by the Orioles to the Minnesota Twins for Mike Hart. The Orioles completed the deal by sending Jeff Hubbard (minors) to the Twins on April 23.

== Regular season ==
=== Season standings ===
AL East
Team	W	L	Pct.	GB	Home	Road
Boston Red Sox	95	66	.590	—	51‍–‍30	44‍–‍36
New York Yankees	90	72	.556	5½	41‍–‍39	49‍–‍33
Detroit Tigers	87	75	.537	8½	49‍–‍32	38‍–‍43
Toronto Blue Jays	86	76	.531	9½	42‍–‍39	44‍–‍37
Cleveland Indians	84	78	.519	11½	45‍–‍35	39‍–‍43
Milwaukee Brewers	77	84	.478	18	41‍–‍39	36‍–‍45
Baltimore Orioles	73	89	.451	22½	37‍–‍42	36‍–‍47

=== Record vs. opponents ===
1986 American League record Sources:
Team	BAL	BOS	CAL	CWS	CLE	DET	KC	MIL	MIN	NYY	OAK	SEA	TEX	TOR
Baltimore	—	4–9	6–6	9–3	4–9	1–12	6–6	6–7	8–4	5–8	5–7	6–6	5–7	8–5
Boston	9–4	—	5–7	7–5	10–3	7–6	6–6	6–6	10–2	5–8	7–5	8–4	8–4	7–6
California	6–6	7–5	—	7–6	6–6	7–5	8–5	5–7	7–6	7–5	10–3	8–5	8–5	6–6
Chicago	3–9	5–7	6–7	—	5–7	6–6	7–6	5–7	6–7	6–6	7–6	8–5	2–11	6–6
Cleveland	9–4	3–10	6–6	7–5	—	4–9	8–4	8–5	6–6	5–8	10–2	9–3	6–6	3–10–1
Detroit	12–1	6–7	5–7	6–6	9–4	—	5–7	8–5	7–5	6–7	6–6	6–6	7–5	4–9
Kansas City	6–6	6–6	5–8	6–7	4–8	7–5	—	6–6	6–7	4–8	8–5	5–8	8–5	5–7
Milwaukee	7–6	6–6	7–5	7–5	5–8	5–8	6–6	—	4–8	8–5	5–7	6–6	4–8	7–6
Minnesota	4–8	2–10	6–7	7–6	6–6	5–7	7–6	8–4	—	4–8	6–7	6–7	6–7	4–8
New York	8–5	8–5	5–7	6–6	8–5	7–6	8–4	5–8	8–4	—	5–7	8–4	7–5	7–6
Oakland	7–5	5–7	3–10	6–7	2–10	6–6	5–8	7–5	7–6	7–5	—	10–3	3–10	8–4
Seattle	6–6	4–8	5–8	5–8	3–9	6–6	8–5	6–6	7–6	4–8	3–10	—	4–9	6–6
Texas	7–5	4–8	5–8	11–2	6–6	5–7	5–8	8–4	7–6	5–7	10–3	9–4	—	5–7
Toronto	5–8	6–7	6–6	6–6	10–3–1	9–4	7–5	6–7	8–4	6–7	4–8	6–6	7–5	—

=== Opening Day starters ===
- Rick Dempsey
- Mike Flanagan
- Jackie Gutiérrez
- Lee Lacy
- Fred Lynn
- Eddie Murray
- Cal Ripken
- John Shelby
- Alan Wiggins
- Mike Young

=== Notable transactions ===
- June 2, 1986: Gordon Dillard was drafted by the Orioles in the 14th round of the 1986 Major League Baseball draft.
- June 16, 1986: Dennis Martínez and a player to be named later were traded by the Orioles to the Montreal Expos for a player to be named later. The Orioles completed the deal by sending John Stefero to the Expos on December 8. The Expos completed the deal by sending Rene Gonzales to the Orioles on December 16.

=== Roster ===
1986 Baltimore Orioles
Roster
Pitchers: 41 Don Aase; 57 Tony Arnold; 45 Eric Bell; 52 Mike Boddicker; 42 Rich Bordi; 34 Storm Davis; 39 Ken Dixon; 46 Mike Flanagan; 54 John Habyan; 47 Brad Havens; 13 Odell Jones; 48 Mike Kinnunen; 30 Dennis Martínez; 23 Tippy Martinez; 16 Scott McGregor; 36 Nate Snell; 32 Bill Swaggerty	Catchers: 24 Rick Dempsey; 25 Carl Nichols; 26 Al Pardo; 21 John Stefero; Infielders: 3 Juan Bonilla; 25 Tom Dodd; 11 Jackie Gutiérrez; 1 Rex Hudler; 30 Ricky Jones; 33 Eddie Murray; 17 Tom O'Malley; 30 Kelly Paris; 6 Floyd Rayford; 8 Cal Ripken Jr.; 28 Jim Traber; 2 Alan Wiggins	Outfielders: 12 Juan Beníquez; 9 Jim Dwyer; 38 Ken Gerhart; 27 Lee Lacy; 19 Fred Lynn; 18 Larry Sheets; 37 John Shelby; 43 Mike Young	Manager: 4 Earl Weaver; Coaches: 10 Terry Crowley (Hitting); 44 Elrod Hendricks (Bullpen); 7 Cal Ripken, Sr. (Third Base); 20 Frank Robinson (Bench); 42 Ken Rowe (Pitching); 40 Jimmy Williams (First Base)

== Player stats ==
=== Batting ===
==== Starters by position ====
Note: Pos = Position; G = Games played; AB = At bats; H = Hits; Avg. = Batting average; HR = Home runs; RBI = Runs batted in

Pos	Player	G	AB	H	Avg.	HR	RBI
C	Rick Dempsey	122	327	68	.208	13	29
1B	Eddie Murray	137	495	151	.305	17	84
2B	Alan Wiggins	71	239	60	.251	0	11
SS	Cal Ripken Jr.	162	627	177	.282	25	81
3B	Floyd Rayford	81	210	37	.176	8	19
LF	Mike Young	117	369	93	.252	9	42
CF	Fred Lynn	112	397	114	.287	23	67
RF	Lee Lacy	130	491	141	.287	11	47
DH	Larry Sheets	112	338	92	.272	18	60

==== Other batters ====
Note: G = Games played; AB = At bats; H = Hits; Avg. = Batting average; HR = Home runs; RBI = Runs batted in

Player	G	AB	H	Avg.	HR	RBI
John Shelby	135	404	92	.228	11	49
Juan Beníquez	113	343	103	.300	6	36
Juan Bonilla	102	284	69	.243	1	18
Jim Traber	65	212	54	.255	13	44
Tom O'Malley	56	181	46	.254	1	18
Jim Dwyer	94	160	39	.244	8	31
Jackie Gutiérrez	61	145	27	.186	0	4
John Stefero	52	120	28	.233	2	13
Ken Gerhart	20	69	16	.232	1	7
Al Pardo	16	51	7	.137	1	3
Ricky Jones	16	33	6	.182	0	4
Tom Dodd	8	13	3	.231	1	2
Kelly Paris	5	10	2	.200	0	0
Carl Nichols	5	5	0	.000	0	0
Rex Hudler	14	1	0	.000	0	0

=== Pitching ===
==== Starting pitchers ====
Note: G = Games pitched; IP = Innings pitched; W = Wins; L = Losses; ERA = Earned run average; SO = Strikeouts

Player	G	IP	W	L	ERA	SO
Mike Boddicker	33	218.1	14	12	4.70	175
Scott McGregor	34	203.0	11	15	4.52	95
Ken Dixon	35	202.1	11	13	4.58	170
Mike Flanagan	29	172.0	7	11	4.24	96
Storm Davis	25	154.0	9	12	3.62	96
John Habyan	6	26.1	1	3	4.44	14
Eric Bell	4	23.1	1	2	5.01	18

==== Relief pitchers ====
Note: G = Games pitched; W = Wins; L = Losses; SV = Saves; ERA = Earned run average; SO = Strikeouts

Player	G	W	L	SV	ERA	SO
Don Aase	66	6	7	34	2.98	67
Rich Bordi	52	6	4	3	4.46	83
Brad Havens	46	3	3	1	4.56	57
Nate Snell	34	2	1	0	3.86	29
Odell Jones	21	2	2	0	3.83	32
Tippy Martinez	14	0	2	1	5.63	11
Tony Arnold	11	0	2	0	3.55	7
Mike Kinnunen	9	0	0	0	6.43	1
Dennis Martínez	4	0	0	0	6.75	2
Bill Swaggerty	1	0	0	0	18.00	1

== Farm system ==
Level	Team	League	Manager
AAA	Rochester Red Wings	International League	John Hart
AA	Charlotte O's	Southern League	Greg Biagini
A	Hagerstown Suns	Carolina League	Bob Molinaro
A-Short Season	Newark Orioles	New York–Penn League	Art Mazmanian
Rookie	Bluefield Orioles	Appalachian League	Glenn Gulliver
