= John Christensen (baseball) =

American baseball player (born 1960)

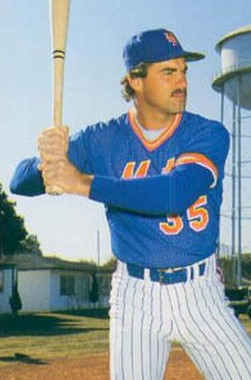
- Right Fielder
- Born: September 5, 1960 (age 65); Downey, California, U.S.
- Batted: Right Threw: Right

MLB debut
- September 13, 1984, for the New York Mets

Last MLB appearance
- October 1, 1988, for the Minnesota Twins

MLB statistics
- Batting average: .224
- Home runs: 5
- Runs batted in: 33
- Stats at Baseball Reference

Teams
- New York Mets (1984–1985); Seattle Mariners (1987); Minnesota Twins (1988)

John Lawrence Christensen (born September 5, 1960) is an American former professional baseball right fielder. He played all or part of four seasons in Major League Baseball (MLB) between 1984 and 1988.

== New York Mets ==
Christensen was originally drafted by the California Angels out of Troy High School in Fullerton, California in the 16th round of the 1978 MLB draft, but elected instead to attend California State University, Fullerton. The New York Mets then selected him in the second round of the 1981 MLB draft. After batting .313 at Triple-A Tidewater in 1984, he debuted with the Mets as a September call-up, batting .273 with three runs batted in and two runs scored with the big league club.

== Two blockbuster trades ==
Christensen's numbers tailed off considerably in 1985; he batted only .212 with the Tidewater Tides, and .186 with the Mets. Following the season, the Mets traded Christensen to the Boston Red Sox along with Calvin Schiraldi, Wes Gardner and La Schelle Tarver for Bob Ojeda, Tom McCarthy, John Mitchell and Chris Bayer. After spending all of 1986 with the International League's Pawtucket Red Sox, he was sent as the player to be named later in the deal that netted Boston Dave Henderson and Spike Owen from the Seattle Mariners.

== Seattle Mariners ==
Christensen batted .385 for Seattle's double A Southern League affiliate, the Chattanooga Lookouts in 1987. However, it did not translate to major league success for him as he batted only .242 in 53 games for the M's. He was again batting .300 in the minor leagues when the Mariners released him on May 23, 1988.

== Minnesota Twins ==
On May 28, Christensen joined the Minnesota Twins. He split the remainder of the season between the Twins, where he batted .263 in 23 games, and their top farm club, the Portland Beavers. He was released at the end of the season, but re-signed to a minor league contract. He returned to Portland, where he batted .270 in 127 games in 1989, his final professional season.
