= John Mitchell (pitcher) =

American baseball player (born 1965)

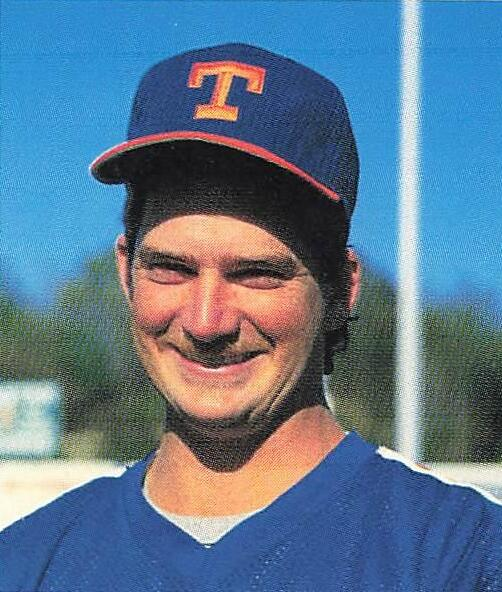
- Mitchell with the Tidewater Tides c. 1988
- Pitcher
- Born: August 11, 1965 (age 59); Dickson, Tennessee, U.S.
- Batted: Right Threw: Right

MLB debut
- September 8, 1986, for the New York Mets

Last MLB appearance
- September 30, 1990, for the Baltimore Orioles

MLB statistics
- Win–loss record: 9–14
- Earned run average: 4.35
- Strikeouts: 107
- Stats at Baseball Reference

Teams
- New York Mets (1986–1989); Baltimore Orioles (1990)

John Kyle Mitchell (born August 11, 1965) is an American former professional baseball pitcher. He pitched in parts of five Major League Baseball (MLB) seasons (1986–1990) for the New York Mets and Baltimore Orioles.

== Boating accident ==
Mitchell was drafted by the Boston Red Sox in the 1983 Major League Baseball draft. On October 30, 1983, after completing his first professional season with the New York–Penn League's Elmira Pioneers, Mitchell and two fellow Red Sox farmhands, Anthony Latham and Scott Skripko, were deep-sea fishing off the coast of Florida when their boat capsized. Boat owner Mark Zastrowmy and Latham drowned. Skripko and Mitchell survived over twenty hours in the water by clinging to debris; Skripko held onto a cooler for 20 hours and Mitchell a bucket for 22 hours.

== Professional career ==
=== Ojeda trade ===
After two more seasons with the Red Sox organization, Mitchell was traded to the Mets along with Bob Ojeda, Tom McCarthy and Chris Bayer for Calvin Schiraldi, John Christensen, Wes Gardner and La Schelle Tarver on November 15, 1985. Mitchell went 12–9 with a 3.39 earned run average in his first season with the Tidewater Tides, and received a call-up to the MLB that September. His MLB debut came on September 8, 1986, against the Montreal Expos at Shea Stadium.

Mitchell enjoyed his most prominent season in the majors in 1987. Despite winning just three games, he pitched decently in 19 starts. He spent most of the next two seasons at Tidewater, pitching just three games and four innings at the major league level.

=== Baltimore Orioles ===
Following the 1989 season, Mitchell and Joaquin Contreras were traded to the Baltimore Orioles for Cesar Mejia and Keith Hughes. In Baltimore, Mitchell set his career high in wins with six, but his ERA was a sub-par 4.64. He never again pitched in the majors.

=== Later minor league career ===
Mitchell signed with the Seattle Mariners organization in 1991, but appeared in just two games for the Calgary Cannons before suffering a season-ending injury. He sat out the entire 1992 season, then started 1993 with the independent Sioux Falls Canaries. He pitched well enough to earn another chance from the Red Sox. He moved on to the Texas Rangers organization in 1994, then spent 1995 with the Ottawa Lynx in the Montreal Expos farm system. After being let go by the Expos, he pitched three seasons in the independent leagues before retiring in 1998. Overall, Mitchell went 97–82 with a 3.34 ERA as a minor leaguer.

=== Career MLB statistics ===
Seasons	W	L	PCT	ERA	G	GS	CG	SV	IP	H	ER	R	HR	BB	K	WP	HBP	BK
5	9	14	.391	4.35	51	37	1	0	240	272	116	138	14	93	107	13	5	1

== Personal life ==
Mitchell lives in Nashville, Tennessee, where he works for a company that makes municipal castings. He is married with four children. His middle child, Johnny Latham Mitchell is named in memory of his fallen teammate. His brother is former Red Sox pitcher Charlie Mitchell.
