= 1986 Milwaukee Brewers season =

1986 Milwaukee Brewers
- League: American League
- Division: East
- Ballpark: Milwaukee County Stadium
- City: Milwaukee, Wisconsin, United States
- Record: 77–84 (.478)
- Divisional place: 6th
- Owners: Bud Selig
- General managers: Harry Dalton
- Managers: George Bamberger, Tom Trebelhorn
- Television: WVTV (Steve Shannon, Mike Hegan)
- Radio: WTMJ (AM) (Bob Uecker, Pat Hughes)

The 1986 Milwaukee Brewers season was the 17th season for the Brewers in Milwaukee, and their 18th overall. The Brewers finished sixth in the American League East with a record of 77 wins and 84 losses.

== Offseason ==
- November 14, 1985: Rick Waits was released by the Brewers.
- November 25, 1985: Pete Ladd was released by the Brewers.
- December 11, 1985: Ed Romero was traded by the Brewers to the Boston Red Sox for Mark Clear.
- December 18, 1985: Dean Freeland (minors) and Eric Pilkington (minors) were traded by the Brewers to the San Francisco Giants for Rob Deer.
- December 22, 1985: Danny Darwin was signed as a free agent with the Brewers.
- March 5, 1986: Ted Simmons was traded by the Brewers to the Atlanta Braves for Rick Cerone, David Clay (minors), and Flavio Alfaro (minors).
- March 26, 1986: Rob DeWolf (minors) was traded by the Brewers to the San Francisco Giants for Steve Stanicek.
- March 30, 1986: Moose Haas was traded by the Brewers to the Oakland Athletics for Charlie O'Brien, Steve Kiefer, Mike Fulmer (minors), and Pete Kendrick (minors).

== Regular season ==
Teddy Higuera would win 20 games in 1986 and would be the last 20 game winner in the 20th century for the Brewers.

=== Season standings ===
AL East
Team	W	L	Pct.	GB	Home	Road
Boston Red Sox	95	66	.590	—	51‍–‍30	44‍–‍36
New York Yankees	90	72	.556	5½	41‍–‍39	49‍–‍33
Detroit Tigers	87	75	.537	8½	49‍–‍32	38‍–‍43
Toronto Blue Jays	86	76	.531	9½	42‍–‍39	44‍–‍37
Cleveland Indians	84	78	.519	11½	45‍–‍35	39‍–‍43
Milwaukee Brewers	77	84	.478	18	41‍–‍39	36‍–‍45
Baltimore Orioles	73	89	.451	22½	37‍–‍42	36‍–‍47

=== Record vs. opponents ===
1986 American League record Sources:
Team	BAL	BOS	CAL	CWS	CLE	DET	KC	MIL	MIN	NYY	OAK	SEA	TEX	TOR
Baltimore	—	4–9	6–6	9–3	4–9	1–12	6–6	6–7	8–4	5–8	5–7	6–6	5–7	8–5
Boston	9–4	—	5–7	7–5	10–3	7–6	6–6	6–6	10–2	5–8	7–5	8–4	8–4	7–6
California	6–6	7–5	—	7–6	6–6	7–5	8–5	5–7	7–6	7–5	10–3	8–5	8–5	6–6
Chicago	3–9	5–7	6–7	—	5–7	6–6	7–6	5–7	6–7	6–6	7–6	8–5	2–11	6–6
Cleveland	9–4	3–10	6–6	7–5	—	4–9	8–4	8–5	6–6	5–8	10–2	9–3	6–6	3–10–1
Detroit	12–1	6–7	5–7	6–6	9–4	—	5–7	8–5	7–5	6–7	6–6	6–6	7–5	4–9
Kansas City	6–6	6–6	5–8	6–7	4–8	7–5	—	6–6	6–7	4–8	8–5	5–8	8–5	5–7
Milwaukee	7–6	6–6	7–5	7–5	5–8	5–8	6–6	—	4–8	8–5	5–7	6–6	4–8	7–6
Minnesota	4–8	2–10	6–7	7–6	6–6	5–7	7–6	8–4	—	4–8	6–7	6–7	6–7	4–8
New York	8–5	8–5	5–7	6–6	8–5	7–6	8–4	5–8	8–4	—	5–7	8–4	7–5	7–6
Oakland	7–5	5–7	3–10	6–7	2–10	6–6	5–8	7–5	7–6	7–5	—	10–3	3–10	8–4
Seattle	6–6	4–8	5–8	5–8	3–9	6–6	8–5	6–6	7–6	4–8	3–10	—	4–9	6–6
Texas	7–5	4–8	5–8	11–2	6–6	5–7	5–8	8–4	7–6	5–7	10–3	9–4	—	5–7
Toronto	5–8	6–7	6–6	6–6	10–3–1	9–4	7–5	6–7	8–4	6–7	4–8	6–6	7–5	—

=== Notable transactions ===
- April 1, 1986: Ray Burris was released by the Brewers.
- August 15, 1986: Danny Darwin was traded by the Brewers to the Houston Astros for Don August and Mark Knudson.

==== Draft picks ====
- June 2, 1986: 1986 Major League Baseball draft
  - Gary Sheffield was drafted by the Brewers in the 1st round (6th pick). Player signed June 26, 1986.
  - Tim McIntosh was drafted by the Brewers in the 3rd round.

=== Roster ===
1986 Milwaukee Brewers
Roster
Pitchers: 41 Mike Birkbeck; 29 Chris Bosio; 25 Mark Clear; 48 Bryan Clutterbuck; 47 Jaime Cocanower; 18 Danny Darwin; 40 Bob Gibson; 49 Teddy Higuera; 34 John Henry Johnson; 43 Mark Knudson; 39 Tim Leary; 10 Bob McClure; 10,20 Juan Nieves; 41 Ray Searage; 50 Pete Vuckovich; 46 Bill Wegman; 37 Dan Plesac	Catchers: 11 Rick Cerone; 22 Charlie Moore; 21 Bill Schroeder; Infielders: 9 Jim Adduci; 3 Juan Castillo; 15 Cecil Cooper; 2 Edgar Díaz; 17 Jim Gantner; 30 Steve Kiefer; 4 Paul Molitor; 1 Ernest Riles; 13 Billy Jo Robidoux; 27 Dale Sveum; 20 Gorman Thomas	Outfielders: 26 Glenn Braggs; 45 Rob Deer; 16 Mike Felder; 7 Paul Householder; 28 Rick Manning; 24 Ben Oglivie; 2 Randy Ready; 19 Robin Yount	Manager: 31 George Bamberger; 42 Tom Trebelhorn; Coaches: 8 Andy Etchebarren (First Base); 12 Larry Haney (Bullpen); 33 Frank Howard (Hitting); 35 Tony Muser (Third Base); 38 Herm Starrette (Pitching)

== Player stats ==
=== Batting ===
==== Starters by position ====
Note: Pos = Position; G = Games played; AB = At bats; H = Hits; Avg. = Batting average; HR = Home runs; RBI = Runs batted in

Pos	Player	G	AB	H	Avg.	HR	RBI
C	Rick Cerone	68	216	56	.259	4	18
1B	Cecil Cooper	134	542	140	.258	12	75
2B	Jim Gantner	139	497	136	.274	7	38
3B	Paul Molitor	105	437	123	.281	9	55
SS	Ernest Riles	145	524	132	.252	9	47
LF	Glenn Braggs	58	215	51	.237	4	18
CF	Robin Yount	140	522	163	.312	9	46
RF	Rob Deer	134	466	108	.232	33	86
DH	Ben Oglivie	103	346	98	.283	5	53

==== Other batters ====
Note: G = Games played; AB = At bats; H = Hits; Avg. = Batting average; HR = Home runs; RBI = Runs batted in

Player	G	AB	H	Avg.	HR	RBI
Dale Sveum	91	317	78	.246	7	35
Charlie Moore	80	235	61	.260	3	39
Bill Schroeder	64	217	46	.212	7	19
Rick Manning	89	205	52	.254	8	27
Billy Jo Robidoux	56	181	41	.227	1	21
Mike Felder	44	155	37	.239	1	13
Gorman Thomas	44	145	26	.179	6	10
Randy Ready	23	79	15	.190	1	4
Paul Householder	26	78	17	.218	1	16
Juan Castillo	26	54	9	.167	0	5
Edgar Díaz	5	13	3	.231	0	0
Jim Adduci	3	11	1	.091	0	0
Steve Kiefer	2	6	0	.000	0	0

=== Pitching ===
==== Starting pitchers ====
Note: G = Games pitched; IP = Innings pitched; W = Wins; L = Losses; ERA = Earned run average; SO = Strikeouts

Player	G	IP	W	L	ERA	SO
Teddy Higuera	34	248.1	20	11	2.79	207
Bill Wegman	35	198.1	5	12	5.13	82
Tim Leary	33	188.1	12	12	4.21	110
Juan Nieves	35	184.2	11	12	4.92	116
Pete Vuckovich	6	32.1	2	4	3.06	12

==== Other pitchers ====
Note: G = Games pitched; IP = Innings pitched; W = Wins; L = Losses; ERA = Earned run average; SO = Strikeouts

Player	G	IP	W	L	ERA	SO
Danny Darwin	27	130.1	6	8	3.52	80
Chris Bosio	10	34.2	0	4	7.01	29
Mike Birkbeck	7	22.0	1	1	4.50	13
Mark Knudson	4	17.2	0	1	7.64	9

==== Relief pitchers ====
Note: G = Games pitched; W = Wins; L = Losses; SV = Saves; ERA = Earned run average; SO = Strikeouts

Player	G	W	L	SV	ERA	SO
Mark Clear	59	5	5	16	2.20	85
Dan Plesac	51	10	7	14	2.97	75
Bryan Clutterbuck	20	0	1	0	4.29	38
John Henry Johnson	19	2	1	1	2.66	42
Jaime Cocanower	17	0	1	0	4.43	22
Ray Searage	17	0	1	1	6.95	10
Bob McClure	13	2	1	0	3.86	11
Bob Gibson	11	1	2	0	4.73	11

== Farm system ==
The Brewers' farm system consisted of five minor league affiliates in 1986. The El Paso Diablos won the Texas League championship, and the Stockton Ports won the California League championship.

Level	Team	League	Manager
Triple-A	Vancouver Canadians	Pacific Coast League	Terry Bevington
Double-A	El Paso Diablos	Texas League	Duffy Dyer
Class A	Stockton Ports	California League	Dave Machemer
Class A	Beloit Brewers	Midwest League	Gomer Hodge
Rookie	Helena Gold Sox	Pioneer League	Dave Huppert
