= Bob Brower =

American baseball player (born 1960)

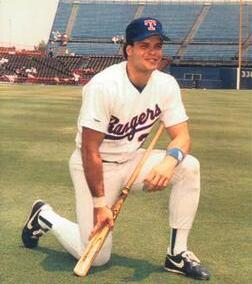
- Brower with the Texas Rangers c. 1987
- Outfielder
- Born: January 10, 1960 (age 66); Jamaica, New York, U.S.
- Batted: Right Threw: Right

MLB debut
- September 3, 1986, for the Texas Rangers

Last MLB appearance
- May 30, 1989, for the New York Yankees

MLB statistics
- Batting average: .242
- Home runs: 17
- Runs batted in: 60
- Stats at Baseball Reference

Teams
- Texas Rangers (1986–1988); New York Yankees (1989)

Robert Richard Brower (born January 10, 1960) is an American former professional baseball outfielder. He was born in Jamaica, New York. Brower attended college at Duke University on a football scholarship and was signed by the Texas Rangers in 1982. Brower played four seasons in Major League Baseball (MLB) with the Rangers (1986–1988) and the New York Yankees in 1989. He had 141 hits in 582 at bats, 17 home runs and 60 RBI. Brower attended James Madison High School in Vienna, Virginia and graduated in 1978. He lettered in football, basketball, baseball, and track during his time at Madison.

Brower played four years of college baseball and three years of college baseball for the Duke Blue Devils. He chose to attend Duke over competing scholarship offers from Virginia Tech, Cincinnati and "almost anywhere on the east coast" because Duke offered to allow him to play for its baseball team as well as its football team. He scored one rushing touchdown on 132 attempts at Duke. He led the nation in triples as a junior, at which point he quit football to focus on a professional baseball career. He was undrafted but signed with the Texas Rangers after a tryout and assigned to the Rookie League. He worked his way up through the minors and won most valuable player awards in the American Association and Dominican Professional Baseball League.

Brower was named a Vice President of the Boras Corporation in 2000.
