= Reggie Ritter =

American baseball player (born 1960)

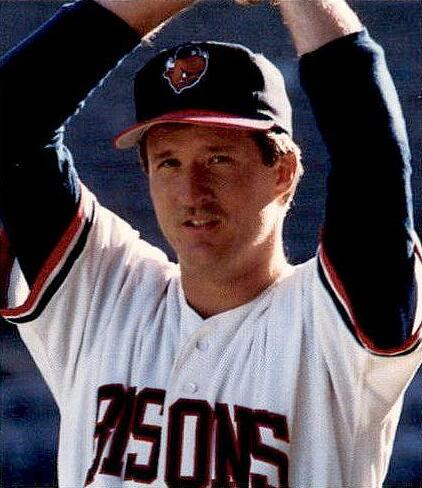
- Ritter with the Buffalo Bisons c. 1987
- Pitcher
- Born: January 23, 1960 (age 65); Malvern, Arkansas, U.S.
- Batted: Left Threw: Right

MLB debut
- May 17, 1986, for the Cleveland Indians

Last MLB appearance
- October 2, 1987, for the Cleveland Indians

MLB statistics
- Win–loss record: 1–1
- Earned run average: 6.14
- Strikeouts: 17
- Stats at Baseball Reference

Teams
- Cleveland Indians (1986–1987)

Reggie Blake Ritter (born January 23, 1960) is an American former Major League Baseball pitcher who played for two seasons. He played for the Cleveland Indians from 1986 to 1987, pitching in 19 career games. He attended Henderson State University where he starred as a designated hitter and a pitcher. Ritter was elected into the HSU Hall of Honor in 2002 and is the only HSU graduate to ever pitch in the Major Leagues.

Ritter was struck in the face by a line drive off the bat of Juan Beniquez while pitching against the Toronto Blue Jays on August 7, 1987. Ritter suffered a broken jaw and received over 30 stitches in his chin. He was placed on the 30-day DL and when he returned to the roster he had lost over 30 pounds. Ritter continued to battle back from his injury but never made it back to the big leagues and he retired in 1990 after playing for the Detroit Tigers organization and the Chicago Cubs organizations.
