= Larry Young (umpire) =

American baseball umpire (born 1954)

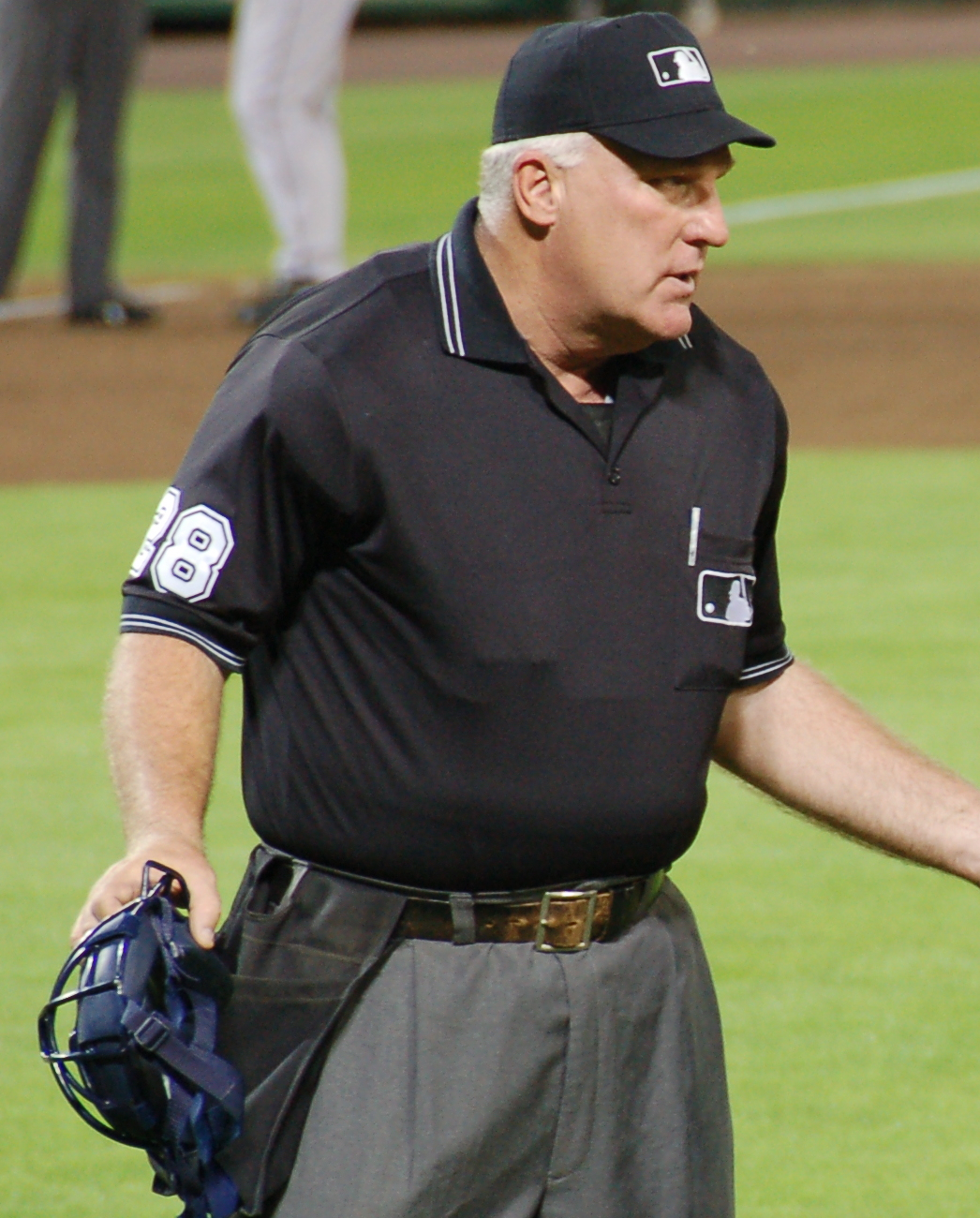
- Young in 2006
- Born: February 6, 1954 (age 71); Dixon, Illinois, U.S.
- Occupation(s): Former MLB umpire Umpire supervisor
- Years active: 1983–2007
- Height: 6 ft 2 in (1.88 m)

Larry Eugene Young (born February 6, 1954) is an American former umpire in Major League Baseball. After beginning his career in the American League in 1983, he worked throughout both leagues from 2000 until his retirement following the 2007 season. He wore uniform number 28.

== Career ==
Young umpired in the World Series in 1996 and 2003, and also in the American League Championship Series in 1992, 1998 and 2002. He officiated in two All-Star Games (1991, 2003), and in six Division Series (1996, 1999, 2000, 2001, 2003, 2004); he was crew chief for the 2004 ALDS between the Anaheim Angels and Boston Red Sox.

As of 2018, Young is a supervisor of MLB umpires.

=== Notable games ===
On August 22, 1989, Young called Nolan Ryan's 5,000th career strikeout against Rickey Henderson.

On April 16, 2001, Young was struck in the forehead by a thrown ball during an Arizona Diamondbacks–St. Louis Cardinals game. Young was taken to a hospital by ambulance and required fourteen stitches. He returned to umpiring on May 1.

== Personal life ==
Young is a graduate of Rock Valley College in Rockford, Illinois. He was an all Conference middle linebacker for the 1973 undefeated football team that was ranked 6th nationally. He is a member of the school's Alumni Hall of Fame.

During an umpires' lockout in 1995, Young refereed a World Wrestling Federation (WWF) match between The Undertaker and King Kong Bundy at WrestleMania XI.

== See also ==
- List of Major League Baseball umpires (disambiguation)
