= Ricky Jones (baseball) =

American baseball player (born 1958)

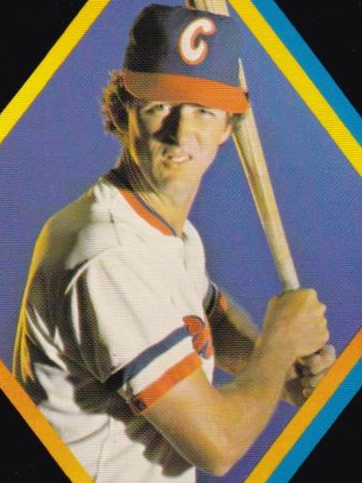
- Jones with the Charlotte O's c. 1987
- Infielder
- Born: June 4, 1958 (age 67); Tupelo, Mississippi
- Batted: Right Threw: Right

MLB debut
- September 3, 1986, for the Baltimore Orioles

Last MLB appearance
- October 5, 1986, for the Baltimore Orioles

MLB statistics
- Batting average: .182
- Home runs: 0
- Runs batted in: 4
- Stats at Baseball Reference

Teams
- Baltimore Orioles (1986)

Ricky Miron Jones (born June 4, 1958) is a former professional baseball infielder. He played in Major League Baseball during the 1986 season for the Baltimore Orioles, appearing in 16 games as a second baseman and third baseman.

== Sources ==
- Career statistics from Baseball Reference · Baseball Reference (Minors) · Retrosheet · Baseball Almanac
