= Terry Cooney =

American baseball umpire (1933–2022)

- Born: April 12, 1933; Condon, Oregon, U.S.
- Died: March 4, 2022 (aged 88); Clovis, California, U.S.

debut
- September 27, 1974

Career highlights and awards
- Ejected Boston Red Sox pitcher Roger Clemens in Game 4 of the 1990 American League Championship Series

Terrance Joseph Cooney (April 12, 1933 – March 4, 2022) was an American umpire in Major League Baseball who worked in the American League (AL) from 1974 to 1992; he wore uniform number 12. He officiated in the 1981 World Series, three American League Championship Series (1978, 1986 and 1990), and two All-Star Games (1979, 1989).

== Biography ==
Cooney attended Sacred Heart Academy in Salem, Oregon, where he earned 14 letters in sports including baseball, football and track, and then played four years of AAU and semi-pro baseball in the Northern California League. He studied physical education and police science at Willamette University, the Oregon College of Education and Modesto Junior College, and also served in the United States Marine Corps. After attending the Umpire Specialization Course, he began his career in the California League (1969–70), Texas League (1970) and Pacific Coast League (1971–74) before moving up to the AL staff at the end of the 1974 season. He was a resident of Fresno, California, throughout his major league career until relocating to suburban Clovis prior to the 1991 season.

Cooney was a prison guard in the late 1960s and was encouraged by an inmate to go to umpire school. The inmate had seen an ad during a Game of the Week telecast promoting professional umpire school in Florida. Cooney successfully made it through the school and worked his way to the majors for the end of the 1974 campaign. Cooney was an American League umpire until an errant pitch from Frank Tanana hit him on the left knee and effectively ended his career as an umpire on September 19, 1992.

In 2002, Cooney was inducted into the Fresno County Athletic Hall of Fame.

He died on March 4, 2022, at the age of 88.

== Legacy ==
Cooney was the home plate umpire in Game 4 of the 1990 American League Championship Series where he ejected Boston Red Sox pitcher Roger Clemens with two out in the bottom of the second inning after Clemens used profanity while arguing balls and strikes. While the Red Sox vehemently protested, Cooney also ejected Marty Barrett from the bench for throwing water coolers on the field. The incident caused a 15-minute delay in the game. At the time, the Red Sox were trailing the Oakland Athletics 1–0 and eventually lost 3–1, being swept in four games.
