= Wes Gardner =

American baseball player (1961–2026)

- Pitcher
- Born: April 29, 1961; Benton, Arkansas, U.S.
- Died: June 10, 2026 (aged 65); Benton, Arkansas, U.S.
- Batted: Right Threw: Right

MLB debut
- July 29, 1984, for the New York Mets

Last MLB appearance
- August 3, 1991, for the Kansas City Royals

MLB statistics
- Win–loss record: 18–30
- Earned run average: 4.90
- Strikeouts: 358
- Stats at Baseball Reference

Teams
- New York Mets (1984–1985); Boston Red Sox (1986–1990); San Diego Padres (1991); Kansas City Royals (1991)

Wesley Brian Gardner (April 29, 1961 – June 10, 2026) was an American Major League Baseball pitcher who was drafted by the New York Mets in the 22nd round of the 1982 Major League Baseball draft, out of the University of Central Arkansas.

== New York Mets ==
Gardner made his major league debut with the Mets on July 29, 1984, pitching a perfect ninth inning in the Mets' 5–1 loss to the Chicago Cubs at Shea Stadium. He appeared in thirty games for the Mets in 1984 and 1985, going 1–3 with a 6.03 earned run average.

== Boston Red Sox ==
On November 13, 1985, Gardner was traded to the Boston Red Sox along with John Christensen, Calvin Schiraldi, and La Schelle Tarver for Bob Ojeda, Tom McCarthy, John Mitchell, and Chris Bayer. He emerged as the team's closer in 1987, leading Boston with ten saves. On July 28, he made his first start since 1982 with the New York–Penn League Little Falls Mets.

During the off-season, Boston acquired Lee Smith to assume closing duties for 1988. After starting the season in the Red Sox's bullpen, Gardner was moved into the starting rotation on June 28. In his first start, Gardner gave up only one earned run in seven innings pitched to earn the win. Gardner won his first four decisions as a starter, and enjoyed career highs in wins (8), strikeouts (106), ERA (3.50), and innings pitched (149) for the season.

Gardner's only post-season appearance came in game three of the 1988 American League Championship Series against the Oakland Athletics. He replaced Mike Boddicker in the third inning with the Sox behind 6–5, and had a no decision in the 10–6 loss to the A's.

== Final season ==
Gardner spent two more seasons with the Red Sox before being traded to the San Diego Padres for two minor leaguers on December 15, 1990. Gardner pitched poorly in San Diego, and was released on May 31, 1991. He signed with the Kansas City Royals a month later, spending most of the season with their American Association affiliate, the Omaha Royals. Gardner only gave up one earned run in 5 2/3 innings with the big league club, but was released on August 8, 1991.

Seasons	W	L	PCT	ERA	G	GS	CG	SV	IP	H	ER	R	HR	BB	K	WP	HBP
8	18	30	.375	4.90	189	44	1	14	466 1/3	476	254	277	52	218	358	17	8

In 2001, Gardner was inducted into the University of Central Arkansas Bears Hall of Fame.

== Death ==
Gardner died on June 10, 2026, at the age of 65.
