= Spike Owen =

American baseball player (born 1961)

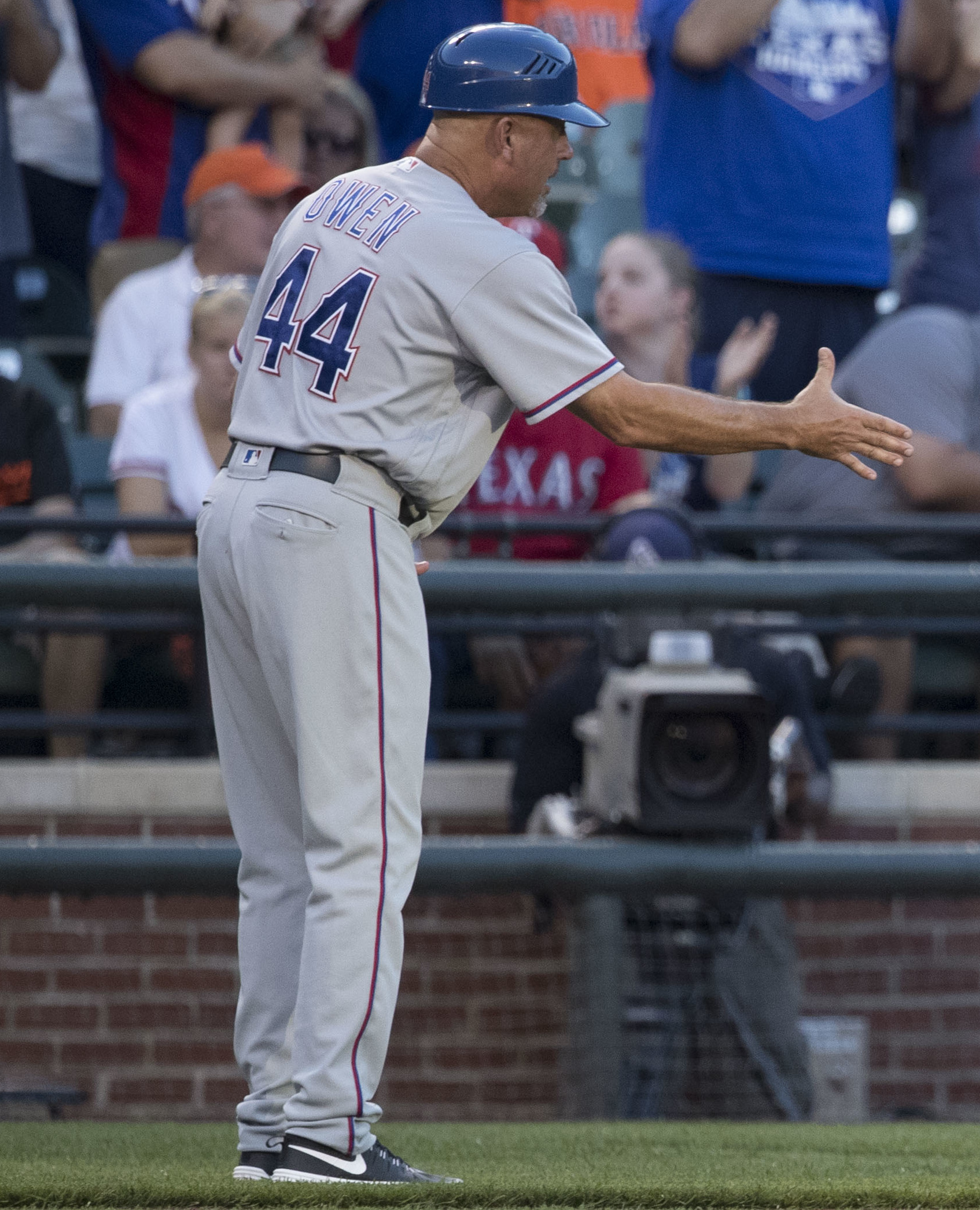
- Owen with the Texas Rangers in 2016
- Shortstop
- Born: April 19, 1961 (age 64); Cleburne, Texas, U.S.
- Batted: Switch Threw: Right

MLB debut
- June 25, 1983, for the Seattle Mariners

Last MLB appearance
- October 2, 1995, for the California Angels

MLB statistics
- Batting average: .246
- Home runs: 46
- Runs batted in: 439
- Stats at Baseball Reference

Teams
- Seattle Mariners (1983–1986); Boston Red Sox (1986–1988); Montreal Expos (1989–1992); New York Yankees (1993); California Angels (1994–1995)
Medals
Men's baseball
Representing the United States
World Games
Gold medal – first place	1981 Santa Clara	Team competition

Spike Dee Owen (born April 19, 1961) is an American former shortstop in Major League Baseball who played for the Seattle Mariners (1983–86), Boston Red Sox (1986–88), Montreal Expos (1989–92), New York Yankees (1993) and California Angels (1994–95). He made his major league debut on June 25, 1983. In his 13 seasons in the majors, he hit for a .246 batting average with 46 home runs and 439 RBIs in 1544 games.

== Career ==
=== Playing career ===
A switch-hitter, Owen attended the University of Texas and played college baseball for the Texas Longhorns. He was the All-Tournament Team shortstop in the 1982 College World Series. He was selected by the Seattle Mariners in the first round (sixth overall) of the 1982 amateur draft. Owen started out in Double-A with the Lynn Sailors of the Eastern League; the following year he was in Triple-A with the Salt Lake City Gulls of the Pacific Coast League (PCL).

In his major league debut in 1983 on Saturday, June 25, Owen led off the bottom of the first inning in the Kingdome with a single off of Jim Gott of the Toronto Blue Jays; Seattle won 5–2 to snap an eight-game losing streak. On July 13, he hit his first big league home run against Boston Red Sox reliever Doug Bird at Fenway Park, a solo shot to right in the ninth inning and the final run scored in a 6–3 win.

In 1986, he was named team captain of the Mariners. On August 19, Owen and center fielder Dave Henderson were traded to the Red Sox for Rey Quiñones, Mike Trujillo, Mike Brown, and a player to be named later. In his third game with the Red Sox, he tied a major league record with six runs scored in a game. In the American League Championship Series, he hit .429 as the Red Sox upended the California Angels in seven games. In the World Series, he hit .300 as Boston lost to the New York Mets in seven games.

On December 8, 1988, the Red Sox traded Owen to the Montreal Expos for pitcher John Dopson and shortstop Luís Rivera.

In 1990, he set a National League record with 63 consecutive errorless games at shortstop. Despite hitting only .234, he showed some decent power with 24 doubles, 5 triples and 5 home runs among his 106 hits. Patience at the plate was the secret of his success with 70 walks (12 intentional), for a respectable .333 on-base percentage.

Owen's most productive season was 1992, with career highs in average (.269), home runs (7), stolen bases (7) and slugging percentage (.381). In addition, he had a healthy .348 on-base percentage and hit well in the clutch at .319 in 91 at-bats with runners in scoring position. He also led the NL in fielding percentage twice. A hard-nosed competitor, he quickly established himself as a leader in the Montreal clubhouse and helped rookie Delino DeShields transition to second base.

After the 1992 season, Owen was supplanted as Montreal shortstop by the emergence of Wil Cordero and became a free agent. On December 4, 1992, he signed a three-year contract with the New York Yankees, aspiring to anchor their infield and provide team leadership. However, in 1993, he led AL middle infielders in one category—salary. The Yankees traded him after the 1993 season to the California Angels for a minor leaguer.

In 1994, he hit a career-high .310 in 82 games for the Angels as an infield backup and eventually as a designated hitter. In 1996, he was demoted to the Texas Rangers' Triple A affiliate, the Oklahoma City 89ers, and in April, Owen announced his retirement.

=== Coaching career ===
Owen was a coach of the Round Rock Express from 2002 to 2006 (as a Houston Astros affiliate) and again from 2011 to 2014 (as a Texas Rangers affiliate). He was the manager of the High Desert Mavericks, Class A-Advanced affiliate of the Texas Rangers in 2015, where he guided the team to a 78-62 record and a second-half South Division title in the California League.

After the 2015 season, Owen was named to manage the Hickory Crawdads, a Class A affiliate of the Texas Rangers, however he was called up to the Rangers in February 2016 to serve as interim third base coach while third base coach Tony Beasley underwent chemotherapy treatment for cancer.

Owen managed Hickory again in 2017. He managed the Down East Wood Ducks in 2018. The Rangers did not retain Owen after the 2018 season.

== Personal life ==
Owen's older brother Dave played for the Chicago Cubs in 1984 and 1985.
