= Mike Brown (pitcher) =

American baseball player (born 1959)

- Pitcher
- Born: March 4, 1959 (age 67); Camden, New Jersey, U.S.
- Batted: Right Threw: Right

MLB debut
- September 16, 1982, for the Boston Red Sox

Last MLB appearance
- August 15, 1987, for the Seattle Mariners

MLB statistics
- Win–loss record: 12–20
- Earned run average: 5.75
- Strikeouts: 115
- Stats at Baseball Reference

Teams
- As player: Boston Red Sox (1982–1986); Seattle Mariners (1986–1987); As coach: Cleveland Indians (2002); Hokkaido Nippon-Ham Fighters (2004–2006); Orix Buffaloes (2008)

Michael Gary Brown (born March 4, 1959) is an American former professional baseball starting pitcher. He played in Major League Baseball (MLB) from 1982 through 1987 for the Boston Red Sox (1982–1986) and Seattle Mariners (1986–1987).

== Career ==
Brown was drafted in the second round of the 1980 MLB draft, the 48th pick overall out of Clemson University. He batted and threw right-handed.

Brown reached MLB in 1982 with the Boston Red Sox, playing in part of five seasons with them before moving to the Seattle Mariners in the same transaction that brought Dave Henderson and Spike Owen to Boston. His most productive season came in 1983 with the Red Sox, when he recorded career bests in wins (six), earned run average (4.67), starts (18), complete games (three) and innings pitched (104). In August 1986, Brown (along with Rey Quiñones, Mike Trujillo, and a player to named later) was traded to the Seattle Mariners. The Red Sox obtained Spike Owen and Dave Henderson. In a six-season career, Brown posted a 12–20 record with 115 strikeouts and a 5.75 ERA in 253 2/3 innings.

Following his retirement, Brown worked with the Cleveland Indians as their minor league pitching coordinator from 1995 to 2001, and as their MLB pitching coach in 2002. After that, he served as pitching coach in Nippon Professional Baseball (NPB).

As of 2013, Brown was a professional scout, based in Naples, Florida, for the Arizona Diamondbacks of MLB.
