= Neal Heaton =

American baseball player (born 1960)

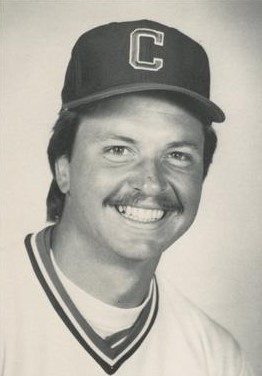
- Pitcher
- Born: March 3, 1960 (age 66); Jamaica, New York, U.S.
- Batted: Left Threw: Left

MLB debut
- September 3, 1982, for the Cleveland Indians

Last MLB appearance
- June 26, 1993, for the New York Yankees

MLB statistics
- Win–loss record: 80–96
- Earned run average: 4.37
- Strikeouts: 699
- Stats at Baseball Reference

Teams
- Cleveland Indians (1982–1986); Minnesota Twins (1986); Montreal Expos (1987–1988); Pittsburgh Pirates (1989–1991); Kansas City Royals (1992); Milwaukee Brewers (1992); New York Yankees (1993)

Career highlights and awards
- All-Star (1990)

Member of the National College

Baseball Hall of Fame
- Induction: 2008

Neal Heaton (born March 3, 1960) is an American former Major League Baseball left-handed pitcher who played for the Cleveland Indians, Minnesota Twins, Montreal Expos, Pittsburgh Pirates, Kansas City Royals, Milwaukee Brewers, and New York Yankees from 1982 to 1993.

Heaton was drafted by the Indians in the 2nd round of the 1981 amateur draft from the University of Miami. He was selected to the National League All-Star team in 1990 with the Pirates. On March 10, 1992, the Pirates traded Heaton to the Kansas City Royals for Kirk Gibson. In his 12-season career, he posted an 80-96 record with 699 strikeouts and a 4.37 ERA in 1507.0 innings pitched.

Heaton was inducted into the Suffolk Sports Hall of Fame on Long Island in the Baseball Category with the Class of 1997.
