= Mike Trujillo =

American baseball player (born 1960)

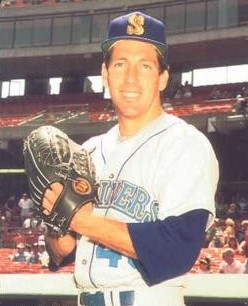
- Pitcher
- Born: January 12, 1960 (age 66); Denver, Colorado, U.S.
- Batted: Right Threw: Right

MLB debut
- April 14, 1985, for the Boston Red Sox

Last MLB appearance
- June 17, 1989, for the Detroit Tigers

MLB statistics
- Win–loss record: 12–12
- Earned run average: 5.02
- Strikeouts: 96
- Stats at Baseball Reference

Teams
- Boston Red Sox (1985–1986); Seattle Mariners (1986–1987); Detroit Tigers (1988–1989)

Michael Andrew Trujillo (born January 12, 1960) is an American former professional baseball pitcher. He played in Major League Baseball (MLB) for the Boston Red Sox, Seattle Mariners, and Detroit Tigers from 1985 to 1989.

== Amateur career ==
A native of Denver, Colorado, Trujillo attended Denver's Mullen High School, where he played several sports. He was recruited to play college football at Yale but chose to hold out for a college baseball scholarship. Trujillo accepted an offer to play baseball at the University of Northern Colorado. In 1981, he played collegiate summer baseball with the Orleans Cardinals of the Cape Cod Baseball League.

== Professional career ==
=== Chicago White Sox ===
Trujillo was drafted in the seventh round (172nd overall) of the 1982 MLB draft by the Chicago White Sox in the free agent draft. After Trujillo was drafted, it took three years for him to reach the majors.

=== Boston Red Sox ===
On September 7, 1984, Trujillo was traded to the San Francisco Giants for Tom O'Malley. He was selected from the Giants by Boston Red Sox in the Rule 5 draft three months later.

Trujillo's first career start was in Boston with the Red Sox on April 14, 1985, at the age of 25. As a rookie, he ended the season with an ERA of 4.82 going 4–4. That year, Trujillo recorded 19 strikeouts in 84 full innings pitched while allowing 23 walks and seven home runs.

During his second year pitching for the Red Sox, Trujillo appeared in three games in the majors, pitching only 5.2 innings. He spent most of 1986 with the Pawtucket Red Sox, where he had a record of 8–9 as a relief pitcher.

=== Seattle Mariners ===
In August 1986, Trujillo (along with Rey Quiñones, Mike Brown, and a player to named later was traded to the Seattle Mariners. The Red Sox obtained Spike Owen and Dave Henderson.

Trujillo spent the rest of the season in the majors with the Mariners. He earned his first major league shutout on September 20. Trujillo finished the season with a 3–2 record, with 19 strikeouts. During his second season as a Mariner, he went 4–4 in 28 games while recording 36 strikeouts. Trujillo allowed 12 home runs and 70 hits during the season. He was released during spring training the following year.

=== Detroit Tigers ===
On March 31, 1988, three days after his release by the Mariners, Trujillo signed a contract with the Detroit Tigers. Trujillo again spent most of the season in the minors with the Toledo Mud Hens, but did pitch six games for Detroit. He did not earn any wins or losses while pitching only 12.1 innings with an ERA of 5.11.

During his final MLB season with the Tigers, Trujillo pitched 25.2 innings. He allowed 35 hits but only three homers. His last major league game was on June 17, 1989. On August 6, 1989, he was sold to the New York Mets, but was granted free agency two months later after pitching in nine games for the minor league Tidewater Tides, ending his career.
