= La Schelle Tarver =

American baseball player (1959–2024)

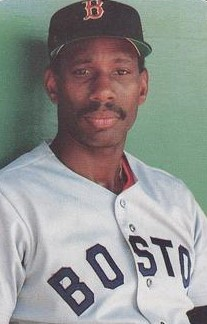
- Outfielder
- Born: January 30, 1959; Modesto, California, U.S.
- Died: March 20, 2024 (aged 65); Fresno, California, U.S.
- Batted: Left Threw: Left

MLB debut
- July 12, 1986, for the Boston Red Sox

Last MLB appearance
- October 5, 1986, for the Boston Red Sox

MLB statistics
- Batting average: .120
- Home runs: 0
- Runs batted in: 1
- Stats at Baseball Reference

Teams
- Boston Red Sox (1986)

La Schelle Tarver (January 30, 1959 – March 20, 2024) was an American professional baseball outfielder in Major League Baseball (MLB) who played for the Boston Red Sox during the 1986 season. Listed at 5' 11", 165 lb., he batted and threw left-handed.

== Early years ==
Tarver was born in 1959 in Modesto, California, and grew up in Madera, California. He was selected as a Northern California All-American first baseman while playing at Madera High School. He was drafted by the California Angels while still in high school, but instead enrolled in junior college. In 1980, he transferred to Sacramento State.

== Professional baseball ==
Tarver was drafted by the New York Mets in the 1980 draft. He was assigned to the Mets' farm system from 1981 to 1985, including stints at Lynchburg, Jacksonville (MS), and Tidewater.

Tarver made his professional debut for Shelby Mets of the South Atlantic league. Tarver played in 110 games and batted .314 for a team that included future major league players like Lenny Dykstra, Randy Milligan and John Gibbons. Tarver earned a late season promotion to the Mets higher-A team, Lynchberg. In 1982, Tarver would rocket up the Mets farm system. He started the season with Lynchberg. He was quickly promoted to the Jackson Mets, the Mets double-a club, before finishing the season with the Tidewater Tides. In 1983, Tarver started with Tidewater, but was sent back to Jackson in order to get more playing time. With Tidwater, Tarver was stuck behind a deep outfield rotation that included Darryl Strawberry, Herm Winningham, Marvell Wynne and Rusty Tillman, all high prospects at the time for the Mets. Despite never hitting below .300 during his time in the Mets farm system, Tarver was never promoted to the majors by the Mets.

In November 1985, the Mets traded Tarver to the Boston Red Sox as part of a multi-player deal that also sent pitchers Wes Gardner and Calvin Schiraldi to Boston in exchange for pitchers Tom McCarthy and Bob Ojeda and two minor leaguers. In the spring of 1986, Tarver was assigned to Pawtucket where he became the club's starting right fielder.

Tarver made his major-league debut in July 1986 after Boston center fielder Tony Armas was injured. At the time he was called up, he was leading the International League with a .359 batting average and a .466 slugging percentage. In his first at bat with the Red Sox, he was cheered by 33,000 fans at Fenway Park. Despite striking out, he "protected the plate and made [Mike] Witt work for the out by tossing 11 pitches."

In his one season With the Red Sox, Tarver was a .120 hitter (3-for-25) with three runs and one RBI in 13 games. He did not have an extra-base hit or a stolen base. Although he did not steal any bases at the major league level, he was primarily valued for his speed in the outfield and on the base paths. A memorable incident occurred in 1986 when a PA announcer at an opposing ballpark announced him as "Tarver La Schelle".

== Post-playing career ==
After his baseball career, Tarver was a longtime corrections officer for Fresno County, California.

Tarver died on March 20, 2024.
