= 1986 Toronto Blue Jays season =

1986 Toronto Blue Jays
- League: American League
- Division: East
- Ballpark: Exhibition Stadium
- City: Toronto
- Record: 86–76 (.531)
- Divisional place: 4th
- Owners: Labatt Breweries, Imperial Trust, Canadian Imperial Bank of Commerce
- General managers: Pat Gillick
- Managers: Jimy Williams
- Television: CFTO-TV (Don Chevrier, Tony Kubek, Fergie Olver); The Sports Network (Don Chevrier, Tony Kubek, Fergie Olver)
- Radio: CJCL (AM) (Jerry Howarth, Tom Cheek)

The 1986 Toronto Blue Jays season was the franchise's tenth season of Major League Baseball. It resulted in the Blue Jays finishing fourth in the American League East with a record of 86 wins and 76 losses.

== Offseason ==
=== Transactions ===
Transactions by the Toronto Blue Jays during the off-season before the 1986 season.

==== October 1985 ====
October 15	Ron Musselman granted free agency.

==== November 1985 ====
November 12	Jeff Burroughs granted free agency. Steve Nicosia granted free agency. Al Oliver granted free agency.

==== December 1985 ====
December 10	Drafted José DeJesús from the Kansas City Royals in the 1985 MLB Rule 5 draft.

==== January 1986 ====
January 3	Signed amateur free agent Luis Sojo to a contract.
January 6	Signed free agent José Escobar from the Philadelphia Phillies to a contract.

==== March 1986 ====
March 14	Signed free agent César Cedeño from the St. Louis Cardinals to a contract.
March 31	Signed free agent Ron Musselman from the Cleveland Indians to a contract.

==== April 1986 ====
April 3	Returned José DeJesús to the Kansas City Royals. Released César Cedeño.

== Regular season ==
Tony Fernández and Jesse Barfield had career years with the Blue Jays. Fernandez led the American League with 683 at bats, and he was the first Blue Jay to get over 200 hits in a season with 213. Barfield led the American League with 40 home runs.

Mark Eichhorn also had a breakout year with the Blue Jays. He was second on the team with 10 saves, and he led the team in ERA with 1.72 and strikeouts with 166. He tied with Jim Clancy and Jimmy Key for the team lead in wins with 14.

- May 17, 1986: Jesse Barfield had six RBIs in one game against the Cleveland Indians.

=== Season standings ===
AL East
Team	W	L	Pct.	GB	Home	Road
Boston Red Sox	95	66	.590	—	51‍–‍30	44‍–‍36
New York Yankees	90	72	.556	5½	41‍–‍39	49‍–‍33
Detroit Tigers	87	75	.537	8½	49‍–‍32	38‍–‍43
Toronto Blue Jays	86	76	.531	9½	42‍–‍39	44‍–‍37
Cleveland Indians	84	78	.519	11½	45‍–‍35	39‍–‍43
Milwaukee Brewers	77	84	.478	18	41‍–‍39	36‍–‍45
Baltimore Orioles	73	89	.451	22½	37‍–‍42	36‍–‍47

=== Record vs. opponents ===
1986 American League record Sources:
Team	BAL	BOS	CAL	CWS	CLE	DET	KC	MIL	MIN	NYY	OAK	SEA	TEX	TOR
Baltimore	—	4–9	6–6	9–3	4–9	1–12	6–6	6–7	8–4	5–8	5–7	6–6	5–7	8–5
Boston	9–4	—	5–7	7–5	10–3	7–6	6–6	6–6	10–2	5–8	7–5	8–4	8–4	7–6
California	6–6	7–5	—	7–6	6–6	7–5	8–5	5–7	7–6	7–5	10–3	8–5	8–5	6–6
Chicago	3–9	5–7	6–7	—	5–7	6–6	7–6	5–7	6–7	6–6	7–6	8–5	2–11	6–6
Cleveland	9–4	3–10	6–6	7–5	—	4–9	8–4	8–5	6–6	5–8	10–2	9–3	6–6	3–10–1
Detroit	12–1	6–7	5–7	6–6	9–4	—	5–7	8–5	7–5	6–7	6–6	6–6	7–5	4–9
Kansas City	6–6	6–6	5–8	6–7	4–8	7–5	—	6–6	6–7	4–8	8–5	5–8	8–5	5–7
Milwaukee	7–6	6–6	7–5	7–5	5–8	5–8	6–6	—	4–8	8–5	5–7	6–6	4–8	7–6
Minnesota	4–8	2–10	6–7	7–6	6–6	5–7	7–6	8–4	—	4–8	6–7	6–7	6–7	4–8
New York	8–5	8–5	5–7	6–6	8–5	7–6	8–4	5–8	8–4	—	5–7	8–4	7–5	7–6
Oakland	7–5	5–7	3–10	6–7	2–10	6–6	5–8	7–5	7–6	7–5	—	10–3	3–10	8–4
Seattle	6–6	4–8	5–8	5–8	3–9	6–6	8–5	6–6	7–6	4–8	3–10	—	4–9	6–6
Texas	7–5	4–8	5–8	11–2	6–6	5–7	5–8	8–4	7–6	5–7	10–3	9–4	—	5–7
Toronto	5–8	6–7	6–6	6–6	10–3–1	9–4	7–5	6–7	8–4	6–7	4–8	6–6	7–5	—

=== Transactions ===
Transactions for the Toronto Blue Jays during the 1986 regular season.

==== April 1986 ====
April 8	Signed free agent Joe Beckwith from the Kansas City Royals to a contract.

==== July 1986 ====
July 6	Acquired Joe Johnson from the Atlanta Braves for Jim Acker. Acquired Duane Ward from the Atlanta Braves for Doyle Alexander.
July 31	Player rights of Joe Beckwith sold to the Los Angeles Dodgers.

==== September 1986 ====
September 1	Purchased Mickey Mahler from the Texas Rangers.

==== Draft picks ====
- June 2, 1986: Doug Linton was drafted by the Blue Jays in the 43rd round of the 1986 Major League Baseball draft. Player signed September 5, 1986.

=== Roster ===
1986 Toronto Blue Jays
Roster
Pitchers: 31 Jim Acker; 33 Doyle Alexander; 32 Luis Aquino; 36 Bill Caudill; 55 John Cerutti; 18 Jim Clancy; 34 Stan Clarke; 25 Steve Davis; 38 Mark Eichhorn; 39 Don Gordon; 50 Tom Henke; 33 Joe Johnson; 22 Jimmy Key; 53 Dennis Lamp; 40 Mickey Mahler; 35 Jeff Musselman; 37 Dave Stieb; 31 Duane Ward	Catchers: 54 Jeff Hearron; 13 Buck Martinez; 12 Ernie Whitt; Infielders: 1 Tony Fernández; 23 Cecil Fielder; 7 Dámaso García; 17 Kelly Gruber; 16 Garth Iorg; 44 Cliff Johnson; 4 Manuel Lee; 19 Fred McGriff; 5 Rance Mulliniks; 26 Willie Upshaw	Outfielders: 29 Jesse Barfield; 11 George Bell; 9 Rick Leach; 15 Lloyd Moseby; 21 Ron Shepherd	Manager: 3 Jimy Williams; Coaches: 43 Cito Gaston; 24 John McLaren; 42 Billy Smith; 8 John Sullivan; 41 Al Widmar

=== Game log ===
1986 Game Log
April: 9–11 (Home: 5–4; Away: 4–7)

#	Date	Opponent	Score	Win	Loss	Save	Attendance	Record
1	April 8	@ Rangers	6–3	Guzmán (1–0)	Stieb (0–1)	Harris (1)	40,602	0–1
2	April 9	@ Rangers	3–1	Alexander (1–0)	Correa (0–1)	Henke (1)	8,589	1–1
3	April 10	@ Rangers	11–10	Henke (1–0)	Harris (0–1)		8,341	2–1
4	April 11	@ Royals	6–2	Clancy (1–0)	Gubicza (0–1)		39,033	3–1
5	April 12	@ Royals	1–0	Leonard (1–0)	Acker (0–1)		24,332	3–2
6	April 13	@ Royals	7–4	Black (1–1)	Stieb (0–2)	Farr (1)	26,684	3–3
7	April 14	Orioles	2–1	Boddicker (1–0)	Alexander (1–1)		43,587	3–4
--	April 16	Orioles	Postponed (rain) Rescheduled for April 17					
8	April 17	Orioles	5–3	Flanagan (1–1)	Key (0–1)	Aase (2)		3–5
9	April 17	Orioles	7–4	Henke (2–0)	Martinez (0–1)		19,251	4–5
10	April 18	Royals	6–4	Leonard (2–0)	Stieb (0–3)	Quisenberry (2)	21,224	4–6
11	April 19	Royals	6–5	Alexander (2–1)	Black (1–2)	Henke (2)	26,149	5–6
12	April 20	Royals	6–4	Leibrandt (2–0)	Lamp (0–1)	Quisenberry (3)	38,141	5–7
13	April 21	Rangers	7–6	Eichhorn (1–0)	Harris (2–2)	Henke (3)	16,219	6–7
14	April 22	Rangers	10–1	Witt (1–0)	Clancy (1–1)	Mahler (1)	16,161	6–8
15	April 23	Rangers	9 – 8	Williams (1–0)	Lamp (0–2)	Harris (2)	17,281	6–9
16	April 25	@ Orioles	2–1 (10)	Eichhorn (2–0)	Aase (1–2)		20,524	7–9
17	April 26	@ Orioles	11–5	Havens (1–1)	Henke (2–1)		22,659	7–10
18	April 27	@ Orioles	8–0	Clancy (2–1)	Dixon (2–1)		29,928	8–10
19	April 29	Angels	4–3	Forster (2–0)	Eichhorn (2–1)	Moore (5)	18,103	8–11
20	April 30	Angels	6–4	Alexander (3–1)	Moore (1–1)		18,171	9–11

May: 14–15 (Home: 7–5; Away: 7–10)

#	Date	Opponent	Score	Win	Loss	Save	Attendance	Record
21	May 1	Angels	7–4	Slaton (3–1)	Key (0–2)	Moore (6)	20,102	9–12
22	May 2	Mariners	3–2 (11)	Ladd (2–1)	Eichhorn (2–2)		18,134	9–13
23	May 3	Mariners	4–2	Morgan (2–2)	Acker (0–2)	Ladd (1)	27,115	9–14
24	May 4	Mariners	3–2	Henke (3–1)	Moore (1–3)		22,154	10–14
25	May 5	Athletics	10–6	Eichhorn (3–2)	Krueger (0–1)		20,111	11–14
26	May 6	Athletics	17–3	Haas (6–0)	Key (0–3)		22,177	11–15
27	May 7	@ Angels	6–2	Sutton (1–3)	Clancy (2–2)	Corbett (2)	24,895	11–16
28	May 8	@ Angels	7–6	Eichhorn (4–2)	Forster (3–1)	Henke (4)	23,650	12–16
29	May 9	@ Mariners	13–3	Moore (2–3)	Stieb (0–4)		12,026	12–17
30	May 10	@ Mariners	8–7 (11)	Ladd (3–1)	Henke (3–2)		20,155	12–18
31	May 11	@ Mariners	4–3	Key (1–3)	Swift (0–3)	Eichhorn (1)	10,172	13–18
32	May 12	@ Athletics	5–3	Clancy (3–2)	Andújar (4–2)	Eichhorn (2)	20,126	14–18
33	May 13	@ Athletics	6–3 (10)	Mooneyham (1–0)	Lamp (0–3)		7,124	14–19
34	May 14	@ Athletics	9–4	Young (1–0)	Stieb (0–5)		10,940	14–20
35	May 16	Indians	7–6	Acker (1–2)	Candiotti (2–4)	Eichhorn (3)	21,251	15–20
36	May 17	Indians	11–5	Key (2–3)	Heaton (1–3)		27,473	16–20
37	May 18	Indians	10–2	Clancy (4–2)	Schulze (2–1)		28,063	17–20
38	May 19	Indians	6–4	Niekro (3–3)	Stieb (0–6)	Bailes (3)	27,202	17–21
39	May 20	@ White Sox	2–1	Davis (2–1)	Cerutti (0–1)		12,837	17–22
40	May 21	@ White Sox	5–4	Nelson (4–1)	Acker (1–3)		13,976	17–23
41	May 22	@ White Sox	5–0	Key (3–3)	Dotson (2–4)		12,605	18–23
42	May 23	@ Indians	3–1	Schulze (3–1)	Clancy (4–3)		61,340	18–24
43	May 24	@ Indians	9–6	Lamp (1–3)	Easterly (0–2)	Eichhorn (4)	12,348	19–24
44	May 25	@ Indians	8–1	Cerutti (1–1)	Schrom (3–2)		13,772	20–24
45	May 26	@ Twins	9–1	Portugal (1–5)	Alexander (3–2)		10,885	20–25
46	May 27	@ Twins	7–6 (11)	Pastore (2–0)	Henke (3–3)		9,052	20–26
47	May 28	@ Twins	14–8	Clancy (5–3)	Blyleven (4–4)		9,133	21–26
48	May 30	White Sox	6–0	Stieb (1–6)	Davis (2–2)		31,125	22–26
49	May 31	White Sox	4–3 (11)	Henke (4–3)	Nelson (4–2)		40,145	23–26

June: 17–11 (Home: 10–8; Away: 7–3)

#	Date	Opponent	Score	Win	Loss	Save	Attendance	Record
50	June 1	White Sox	6–4	Dotson (3–5)	Key (3–4)		31,302	23–27
51	June 2	Twins	3–1	Clancy (6–3)	Blyleven (4–5)	Henke (5)	26,022	24–27
52	June 3	Twins	6–5	Eichhorn (5–2)	Atherton (2–3)	Henke (6)	27,112	25–27
53	June 4	Twins	10–4	Viola (5–5)	Stieb (1–7)		30,234	25–28
54	June 6	@ Tigers	12–2	Alexander (4–2)	Terrell (6–3)		37,353	26–28
55	June 7	@ Tigers	2–1	Tanana (5–4)	Key (3–5)	Hernández (9)	37,750	26–29
56	June 8	@ Tigers	4–2	Eichhorn (6–2)	O'Neal (0–3)	Henke (7)	36,681	27–29
57	June 9	Red Sox	5–1	Stieb (2–7)	Woodward (1–2)		27,551	28–29
58	June 10	Red Sox	4–3 (10)	Stanley (3–2)	Eichhorn (6–3)		28,149	28–30
59	June 11	Red Sox	3–2	Clemens (11–0)	Alexander (4–3)	Stanley (10)	25,226	28–31
60	June 12	Tigers	9–0 (7)	Key (4–5)	LaPoint (2–5)		30,135	29–31
61	June 13	Tigers	10–5	King (2–0)	Clancy (6–4)		36,471	29–32
62	June 14	Tigers	6–5	Henke (5–3)	Hernández (2–3)		40,063	30–32
63	June 15	Tigers	9–6	Lamp (2–3)	Cary (0–2)	Henke (8)	38,157	31–32
64	June 16	@ Brewers	9–2	Alexander (5–3)	Wegman (2–6)	Gordon (1)	12,809	32–32
65	June 17	@ Brewers	2–1 (12)	Henke (6–3)	Plesac (4–4)		14,465	33–32
66	June 18	@ Brewers	3–1	Higuera (9–5)	Clancy (6–5)		21,652	33–33
67	June 19	Yankees	10–9 (10)	Caudill (1–0)	Righetti (4–4)		35,389	34–33
68	June 20	Yankees	10–8 (10)	Fisher (3–3)	Gordon (0–1)		38,109	34–34
69	June 21	Yankees	4–2 (10)	Righetti (5–4)	Lamp (2–4)	Pulido (1)	43,678	34–35
70	June 22	Yankees	15–1	Key (5–5)	Niekro (7–5)		40,101	35–35
71	June 23	Brewers	5–3	Darwin (4–3)	Stieb (2–8)	Plesac (6)	26,110	35–36
72	June 24	Brewers	8–0	Cerutti (2–1)	Higuera (9–6)		26,280	36–36
73	June 25	Brewers	5–1	Clancy (7–5)	Leary (6–6)	Lamp (1)	30,181	37–36
74	June 27	@ Yankees	14–7	Acker (2–3)	Fisher (4–4)	Henke (9)	30,815	38–36
75	June 28	@ Yankees	7–4	Key (6–5)	Niekro (7–6)		43,187	39–36
76	June 29	@ Yankees	6–3	Cerutti (3–1)	Fisher (4–5)	Henke (10)	35,437	40–36
77	June 30	@ Red Sox	10–9 (10)	Stanley (5–2)	Acker (2–4)		30,770	40–37

July: 15–11 (Home: 5–5; Away: 10–6)

#	Date	Opponent	Score	Win	Loss	Save	Attendance	Record
78	July 1	@ Red Sox	9–7	Seaver (3–6)	Alexander (5–4)	Sambito (7)	32,729	40–38
79	July 2	@ Red Sox	4–2	Key (7–5)	Clemens (14–1)	Henke (11)	27,493	41–38
80	July 3	@ Red Sox	8–5	Cerutti (4–1)	Boyd (10–6)	Henke (12)	21,123	42–38
81	July 4	Angels	9–1	Sutton (7–5)	Stieb (2–9)		30,283	42–39
82	July 5	Angels	7–3	Clancy (8–5)	Romanick (5–7)		40,426	43–39
83	July 6	Angels	8–2	McCaskill (9–5)	Lamp (2–5)		36,197	43–40
84	July 7	Mariners	7–5	Key (8–5)	Morgan (6–8)	Caudill (1)	26,208	44–40
85	July 8	Mariners	8–5	Huismann (2–2)	Cerutti (4–2)	Young (8)	28,241	44–41
86	July 9	Mariners	6–5	Caudill (2–0)	Moore (5–8)	Henke (13)	30,044	45–41
87	July 10	Athletics	8–4	Clancy (9–5)	Plunk (2–5)		28,172	46–41
88	July 11	Athletics	6–5	Eichhorn (7–3)	Rijo (3–8)	Henke (14)	30,370	47–41
89	July 12	Athletics	5–3	Stewart (2–0)	Key (8–6)	Ontiveros (8)	35,470	47–42
90	July 13	Athletics	10–5	Young (6–6)	Caudill (2–1)	Leiper (1)	37,138	47–43
91	July 17	@ Angels	8–5	Key (9–6)	Sutton (8–6)	Cerutti (1)	31,585	48–43
92	July 18	@ Angels	2–0	Clancy (10–5)	McCaskill (10–6)	Eichhorn (5)	31,672	49–43
93	July 19	@ Angels	9–3	Candelaria (3–0)	Stieb (2–10)		30,577	49–44
94	July 20	@ Angels	6–3 (10)	Henke (7–3)	Corbett (2–2)	Caudill (2)	27,795	50–44
95	July 21	@ Mariners	8–3	Cerutti (5–2)	Huismann (2–3)		17,823	51–44
96	July 22	@ Mariners	8–7 (12)	Reed (3–0)	Caudill (2–2)		10,152	51–45
97	July 23	@ Mariners	6–2	Clancy (11–5)	Moore (6–10)	Stieb (1)	11,485	52–45
98	July 25	@ Athletics	6–5 (10)	Bair (1–2)	Caudill (2–3)		12,778	52–46
99	July 26	@ Athletics	2–0	Plunk (3–6)	Cerutti (5–3)	Andújar (1)	22,168	52–47
100	July 27	@ Athletics	1–0 (15)	Leiper (1–1)	Clarke (0–1)		21,628	52–48
101	July 28	@ Royals	6–0	Clancy (12–5)	Leibrandt (9–7)		40,468	53–48
102	July 29	@ Royals	5–2	Stieb (3–10)	Bankhead (4–5)	Henke (15)	27,292	54–48
103	July 30	@ Royals	7–2	Johnson (1–0)	Leonard (6–10)		35,750	55–48

August: 18–10 (Home: 11–5; Away: 7–5)

#	Date	Opponent	Score	Win	Loss	Save	Attendance	Record
104	August 1	Orioles	7–3	Dixon (10–8)	Key (9–7)		34,370	55–49
105	August 2	Orioles	5–2	McGregor (8–10)	Clancy (12–6)	Aase (28)	41,091	55–50
106	August 3	Orioles	6–4	Cerutti (6–3)	Flanagan (5–7)	Henke (16)	36,446	56–50
107	August 4	Orioles	12–2	Boddicker (14–5)	Johnson (1–1)		35,041	56–51
108	August 5	Royals	8–6	Bankhead (5–5)	Lamp (2–6)	Farr (6)	30,437	56–52
109	August 6	Royals	8–0	Key (10–7)	Jackson (6–8)		32,130	57–52
110	August 7	Royals	5–4	Eichhorn (8–3)	Farr (7–3)	Henke (17)	34,285	58–52
111	August 8	@ Rangers	9–7	Harris (6–8)	Eichhorn (8–4)		31,197	58–53
112	August 9	@ Rangers	7–6 (10)	Harris (7–8)	Caudill (2–4)		31,517	58–54
113	August 10	@ Rangers	8–7 (10)	Eichhorn (9–3)	Williams (8–4)		15,040	59–54
114	August 11	@ Orioles	3–1	Flanagan (6–7)	Key (10–8)	Aase (29)	21,444	59–55
115	August 12	@ Orioles	3–0	Clancy (13–6)	McGregor (8–11)		20,292	60–55
116	August 13	@ Orioles	7–6 (13)	Aase (5–3)	Aquino (0–1)		22,477	60–56
117	August 15	Rangers	6–1	Johnson (2–1)	Correa (7–10)	Eichhorn (6)	31,411	61–56
118	August 16	Rangers	13–1	Key (11–8)	Hough (9–8)		41,203	62–56
119	August 17	Rangers	8–7 (11)	Eichhorn (10–4)	Russell (4–2)		38,413	63–56
120	August 19	White Sox	5–1	Stieb (4–10)	Cowley (8–8)		34,158	64–56
121	August 20	White Sox	4–1	Johnson (3–1)	DeLeón (3–2)		33,493	65–56
122	August 21	White Sox	4–3	Schmidt (1–4)	Key (11–9)	Nelson (5)	35,393	65–57
123	August 22	@ Twins	4–3	Blyleven (13–10)	Clancy (13–7)	Frazier (2)	14,359	65–58
124	August 23	@ Twins	7–4	Cerutti (7–3)	Smithson (9–12)	Eichhorn (7)	22,604	66–58
125	August 24	@ Twins	7–5 (10)	Henke (8–3)	Atherton (5–8)		18,117	67–58
126	August 26	@ Indians	6–6 (9)	Postponed (rain) Rescheduled for August 27			5,400	67–58
127	August 27	@ Indians	3–2 (12)	Eichhorn (11–4)	Oelkers (2–3)	Henke (18)		68–58
128	August 27	@ Indians	6–3	Cerutti (8–3)	Wills (1–2)	Henke (19)	9,051	69–58
129	August 28	@ Indians	9–1	Clancy (14–7)	Schrom (11–6)		7,466	70–58
130	August 29	Twins	6–5	Eichhorn (12–4)	Atherton (5–10)		38,241	71–58
131	August 30	Twins	8–1	Johnson (4–1)	Viola (13–10)	Lamp (2)	43,556	72–58
132	August 31	Twins	7–5	Aquino (1–1)	Anderson (3–5)	Eichhorn (8)	45,161	73–58

September: 12–15 (Home: 5–5; Away: 7–10)

#	Date	Opponent	Score	Win	Loss	Save	Attendance	Record
133	September 1	Indians	5–4	Henke (9–3)	Camacho (2–3)		44,335	74–58
134	September 2	Indians	9–5	Schrom (12–6)	Clancy (14–8)	Wills (2)	33,535	74–59
135	September 3	Indians	3–1	Stieb (5–10)	Candiotti (13–10)	Henke (20)	31,532	75–59
136	September 5	@ White Sox	5–0	Dotson (10–13)	Johnson (4–2)		11,650	75–60
137	September 6	@ White Sox	4–0	Key (12–9)	Bannister (9–11)		22,014	76–60
138	September 7	@ White Sox	4–3	Nelson (6–6)	Clancy (14–9)	Thigpen (5)	13,553	76–61
139	September 9	Yankees	3–1	Guidry (7–10)	Eichhorn (12–5)	Righetti (36)	35,353	76–62
--	September 10	Yankees	Postponed (rain) Rescheduled for September 11					
140	September 11	Yankees	3–1	Drabek (5–7)	Key (12–10)	Righetti (37)		76–63
141	September 11	Yankees	7–5	Fisher (9–5)	Henke (9–4)	Righetti (38)	33,292	76–64
142	September 12	@ Brewers	4–1	Johnson (2–1)	Clancy (14–10)	Clear (13)	7,255	76–65
143	September 13	@ Brewers	7–1	Johnson (5–2)	Vuckovich (1–2)	Eichhorn (9)	10,472	77–65
144	September 14	@ Brewers	5–0	Higuera (19–9)	Stieb (5–11)		8,706	77–66
145	September 15	@ Brewers	5–2	Cerutti (9–3)	Wegman (4–12)	Henke (21)	5,742	78–66
146	September 16	Tigers	6–4	Key (13–10)	Terrell (12–12)	Henke (22)	31,128	79–66
147	September 17	Tigers	8–6	Morris (18–8)	Clancy (14–11)	Hernández (22)	30,116	79–67
148	September 19	Red Sox	6–4	Stieb (6–11)	Seaver (7–13)	Henke (23)	40,494	80–67
149	September 20	Red Sox	5–2	Johnson (6–2)	Nipper (9–11)	Eichhorn (10)	43,713	81–67
150	September 21	Red Sox	3–2	Clemens (24–4)	Key (13–11)	Schiraldi (9)	44,197	81–68
151	September 22	@ Tigers	2–1	Morris (19–8)	Clancy (14–12)		14,979	81–69
152	September 23	@ Tigers	6–3	Eichhorn (13–5)	Hernández (8–7)	Henke (24)	14,364	82–69
153	September 24	@ Tigers	8–2	Stieb (7–11)	Petry (5–9)		15,069	83–69
154	September 25	@ Tigers	4–2	Johnson (7–2)	Tanana (11–9)	Henke (25)	16,591	84–69
155	September 26	@ Red Sox	1–0 (12)	Eichhorn (14–5)	Schiraldi (4–2)	Henke (26)	33,657	85–69
156	September 27	@ Red Sox	2–0	Hurst (13–7)	Clancy (14–13)		33,358	85–70
157	September 28	@ Red Sox	12–3	Boyd (16–10)	Ward (0–1)		32,929	85–71
158	September 29	@ Yankees	8–1	Rasmussen (17–6)	Cerutti (9–4)		15,770	85–72
159	September 30	@ Yankees	5–2	Nielsen (3–4)	Stieb (7–12)	Righetti (43)	15,166	85–73

October: 1–3 (Home: 1–0; Away: 0–3)

#	Date	Opponent	Score	Win	Loss	Save	Attendance	Record
160	October 1	@ Yankees	3–0	Key (14–11)	Guidry (9–12)	Henke (27)	17,876	86–73
161	October 3	Brewers	4–1	Wegman (5–12)	Clancy (14–14)	Plesac (14)	26,619	86–74
--	October 4	Brewers	Postponed (rain) Rescheduled for October 5					
162	October 5	Brewers	2–1	Leary (12–12)	Henke (9–5)	Clear (15)		86–75
163	October 5	Brewers	4–3	Nieves (11–12)	Eichhorn (14–6)	Clear (16)	34,176	86–76

== Player stats ==
= Indicates team leader

= Indicates league leader

=== Batting ===
==== Starters by position ====
Note: Pos = Position; G = Games played; AB = At bats; H = Hits; Avg. = Batting average; HR = Home runs; RBI = Runs batted in

Pos	Player	G	AB	H	Avg.	HR	RBI
C	Ernie Whitt	131	395	106	.268	16	56
1B	Willie Upshaw	155	573	144	.251	9	60
2B	Dámaso García	122	424	119	.281	6	46
3B	Rance Mulliniks	117	348	90	.259	11	45
SS	Tony Fernández	163	687	213	.310	10	65
LF	George Bell	159	641	198	.309	31	108
CF	Lloyd Moseby	152	589	149	.253	21	86
RF	Jesse Barfield	158	589	170	.289	40	108
DH	Cliff Johnson	107	336	84	.250	15	55

==== Other batters ====
Note: G = Games played; AB = At bats; H = Hits; Avg. = Batting average; HR = Home runs; RBI = Runs batted in

Player	G	AB	H	Avg.	HR	RBI
Garth Iorg	137	327	85	.260	3	44
Rick Leach	110	246	76	.309	5	39
Buck Martinez	81	160	29	.181	2	12
Kelly Gruber	87	143	28	.196	5	15
Cecil Fielder	34	83	13	.157	4	13
Manuel Lee	35	78	16	.205	1	7
Ron Shepherd	65	69	14	.203	2	4
Jeff Hearron	12	23	5	.217	0	4
Fred McGriff	3	5	1	.200	0	0

=== Pitching ===
==== Starting pitchers ====
Note: G = Games pitched; IP = Innings pitched; W = Wins; L = Losses; ERA = Earned run average; SO = Strikeouts

Player	G	IP	W	L	ERA	SO
Jimmy Key	36	232.0	14	11	3.57	141
Jim Clancy	34	219.1	14	14	3.94	126
Dave Stieb	37	205.0	7	12	4.74	127
Doyle Alexander	17	111.0	5	4	4.46	65
Joe Johnson	16	88.0	7	2	3.89	39

==== Other pitchers ====
Note: G = Games pitched; IP = Innings pitched; W = Wins; L = Losses; SV = Saves; ERA = Earned run average; SO = Strikeouts

Player	G	IP	W	L	SV	ERA	SO
John Cerutti	34	145.1	9	4	1	4.15	89
Jim Acker	23	60.0	2	4	0	4.35	32
Duane Ward	2	2.0	0	1	0	13.50	1

==== Relief pitchers ====
Note: G = Games pitched; IP = Innings pitched; W = Wins; L = Losses; SV = Saves; ERA = Earned run average; SO = Strikeouts

Player	G	IP	W	L	SV	ERA	SO
Tom Henke	63	91.1	9	5	27	3.35	118
Mark Eichhorn	69	157.0	14	6	10	1.72	166
Dennis Lamp	40	73.0	2	6	2	5.05	30
Bill Caudill	40	36.1	2	4	2	6.19	32
Don Gordon	14	21.2	0	1	1	7.06	13
Stan Clarke	10	12.2	0	1	0	9.24	9
Luis Aquino	7	11.1	1	1	0	6.35	5
Jeff Musselman	6	5.1	0	0	0	10.13	4
Steve Davis	3	3.2	0	0	0	17.18	5
Mickey Mahler	2	1.0	0	0	0	0.00	0

== Award winners ==
- Jesse Barfield, American League Home Run Champion, 40 Home Runs
- Jesse Barfield, Gold Glove Award
- Jesse Barfield, Silver Slugger Award
- George Bell, Silver Slugger Award
- Mark Eichhorn, The Sporting News Rookie of the Year Award
- Tony Fernández, American League Leader in At-Bats, 687
- Tony Fernández, Gold Glove Award

All-Star Game

- Jesse Barfield, outfield
- Lloyd Moseby, outfield
- Tony Fernández, shortstop

== Farm system ==
Level	Team	League	Manager
AAA	Syracuse Chiefs	International League	Doug Ault
AA	Knoxville Blue Jays	Southern League	Larry Hardy
A	Ventura County Gulls	California League	Glenn Ezell
A	Florence Blue Jays	South Atlantic League	Héctor Torres
A-Short Season	St. Catharines Blue Jays	New York–Penn League	Cloyd Boyer
Rookie	Medicine Hat Blue Jays	Pioneer League	Dennis Holmberg

LEAGUE CHAMPIONS: St. Catharines
