= 1986 California Angels season =

Major League Baseball season

1986 California Angels
- American League West champions
- League: American League
- Division: West
- Ballpark: Anaheim Stadium
- City: Anaheim, California
- Record: 92–70 (.568)
- Divisional place: 1st
- Owner: Gene Autry
- General manager: Mike Port
- Manager: Gene Mauch
- Television: KTLA (Joe Torre, Bob Starr)
- Radio: KMPC (Ron Fairly, Al Conin); XPRS (Ruben Valentin, Ulpiano Cos Villa)
- Stats: ESPN.com; Baseball Reference

The 1986 California Angels season was the 26th season of the Angels franchise in the American League, the 21st in Anaheim, and their 21st season playing their home games at Anaheim Stadium. The season ended with the Angels losing the American League Championship Series in dramatic fashion.

The regular season ended with the Angels finishing first in the American League West with a record of 92–70, earning the franchise's third division title. After jumping to a 3–1 series lead over the Boston Red Sox in the best-of-seven ALCS, the Angels blew a 3-run lead in the ninth inning of Game 5 that included giving up a two-out, two-strike home run to Boston's Dave Henderson (in other words, the Angels were 1 strike away from the World Series). The Angels went on to lose Game 5 in extra innings, and eventually lost the next two games and the series.

After 1986, the Angels went into a lengthy playoff drought, not returning to the postseason until their championship season of 2002 (though they did come close in 1995). They would not win a division title again until 2004.

== Offseason ==
- November 19, 1985: DeWayne Buice was signed as a free agent with the California Angels.
- December 5, 1985: Don Sutton was signed as a free agent by the Angels.
- December 20, 1985: Daryl Sconiers was released by the Angels.
- December 20, 1985: Geoff Zahn was released by the California Angels.

== Regular season ==
- May 4, 1986: Reggie Jackson hit the 537th home run of his career off Boston Red Sox pitcher Roger Clemens, passing Mickey Mantle on the all-time home run list.
- June 18, 1986: Don Sutton won the 300th game of his career. Sutton became the 19th pitcher in MLB history to win 300 games.
- September 18, 1986: Reggie Jackson had 3 home runs and 7 RBIs in one game.

=== Season standings ===
AL West
Team	W	L	Pct.	GB	Home	Road
California Angels	92	70	.568	—	50‍–‍32	42‍–‍38
Texas Rangers	87	75	.537	5	51‍–‍30	36‍–‍45
Kansas City Royals	76	86	.469	16	45‍–‍36	31‍–‍50
Oakland Athletics	76	86	.469	16	47‍–‍36	29‍–‍50
Chicago White Sox	72	90	.444	20	41‍–‍40	31‍–‍50
Minnesota Twins	71	91	.438	21	43‍–‍38	28‍–‍53
Seattle Mariners	67	95	.414	25	41‍–‍41	26‍–‍54

=== Record vs. opponents ===
1986 American League record Sources:
Team	BAL	BOS	CAL	CWS	CLE	DET	KC	MIL	MIN	NYY	OAK	SEA	TEX	TOR
Baltimore	—	4–9	6–6	9–3	4–9	1–12	6–6	6–7	8–4	5–8	5–7	6–6	5–7	8–5
Boston	9–4	—	5–7	7–5	10–3	7–6	6–6	6–6	10–2	5–8	7–5	8–4	8–4	7–6
California	6–6	7–5	—	7–6	6–6	7–5	8–5	5–7	7–6	7–5	10–3	8–5	8–5	6–6
Chicago	3–9	5–7	6–7	—	5–7	6–6	7–6	5–7	6–7	6–6	7–6	8–5	2–11	6–6
Cleveland	9–4	3–10	6–6	7–5	—	4–9	8–4	8–5	6–6	5–8	10–2	9–3	6–6	3–10–1
Detroit	12–1	6–7	5–7	6–6	9–4	—	5–7	8–5	7–5	6–7	6–6	6–6	7–5	4–9
Kansas City	6–6	6–6	5–8	6–7	4–8	7–5	—	6–6	6–7	4–8	8–5	5–8	8–5	5–7
Milwaukee	7–6	6–6	7–5	7–5	5–8	5–8	6–6	—	4–8	8–5	5–7	6–6	4–8	7–6
Minnesota	4–8	2–10	6–7	7–6	6–6	5–7	7–6	8–4	—	4–8	6–7	6–7	6–7	4–8
New York	8–5	8–5	5–7	6–6	8–5	7–6	8–4	5–8	8–4	—	5–7	8–4	7–5	7–6
Oakland	7–5	5–7	3–10	6–7	2–10	6–6	5–8	7–5	7–6	7–5	—	10–3	3–10	8–4
Seattle	6–6	4–8	5–8	5–8	3–9	6–6	8–5	6–6	7–6	4–8	3–10	—	4–9	6–6
Texas	7–5	4–8	5–8	11–2	6–6	5–7	5–8	8–4	7–6	5–7	10–3	9–4	—	5–7
Toronto	5–8	6–7	6–6	6–6	10–3–1	9–4	7–5	6–7	8–4	6–7	4–8	6–6	7–5	—

=== Notable transactions ===
- June 2, 1986: Alan Mills was drafted by the California Angels in the 1st round (8th pick) of the 1986 amateur draft (secondary phase). Player signed June 10, 1986.

=== Roster ===
1986 California Angels
Roster
Pitchers: 63 T. R. Bryden; 45 John Candelaria; 48 Ray Chadwick; 46 Mike Cook; 23 Doug Corbett; 31 Chuck Finley; 38 Todd Fischer; 43 Ken Forsch; 51 Terry Forster; 52 Willie Fraser; 36 Gary Lucas; 18 Urbano Lugo; 15 Kirk McCaskill; 37 Donnie Moore; 10 Ron Romanick; 43 Vern Ruhle; 41 Jim Slaton; 20,27 Don Sutton; 39 Mike Witt	Catchers: 8 Bob Boone; 34 Jerry Narron; Infielders: 7 Rick Burleson; 11 Doug DeCinces; 4 Bobby Grich; 16 Jack Howell; 21 Wally Joyner; 28 Mark McLemore; 12 Gus Polidor; 22 Dick Schofield; 9 Rob Wilfong	Outfielders: 5 Brian Downing; 25 George Hendrick; 44 Reggie Jackson; 13 Ruppert Jones; 32 Darrell Miller; 20,24 Gary Pettis; 6 Mark Ryal; 30 Devon White	Manager: 3 Gene Mauch; Coaches: 49 Bob Clear; 1 Bobby Knoop; 51,53 Marcel Lachemann; 50 Jimmie Reese; 47 Moose Stubing

== Game log ==
=== Regular season ===
1986 regular season game log: 92–70 (home: 50–32; away: 42–38)
April: 13–8 (home: 7–3; away: 6–6)

#	Date	Time (PT)	Opponent	Score	Win	Loss	Save	Time of Game	Attendance	Record	Box/ Streak

May: 10–17 (home: 5–7; away: 5–10)

#	Date	Time (PT)	Opponent	Score	Win	Loss	Save	Time of Game	Attendance	Record	Box/ Streak

June: 17–10 (home: 9–6; away: 8–4)

#	Date	Time (PT)	Opponent	Score	Win	Loss	Save	Time of Game	Attendance	Record	Box/ Streak

July: 15–11 (home: 5–7; away: 10–4)

#	Date	Time (PT)	Opponent	Score	Win	Loss	Save	Time of Game	Attendance	Record	Box/ Streak
**57th All-Star Game in Houston, Texas**

August: 19–10 (home: 12–2; away: 7–8)

#	Date	Time (PT)	Opponent	Score	Win	Loss	Save	Time of Game	Attendance	Record	Box/ Streak

September: 17–10 (home: 12–7; away: 5–3)

#	Date	Time (PT)	Opponent	Score	Win	Loss	Save	Time of Game	Attendance	Record	Box/ Streak

October: 1–4 (home: 0–0; away: 1–4)

#	Date	Time (PT)	Opponent	Score	Win	Loss	Save	Time of Game	Attendance	Record	Box/ Streak

Legend: = Win = Loss = Postponement
Bold = Angels team member

=== Postseason Game log ===
1986 Postseason game log: 3–4 (home: 2–1; away: 1–3)
AL Championship Series: vs. Boston Red Sox 3–4 (home: 2–1; away: 1–3)

#	Date	Time (PT)	Opponent	Score	Win	Loss	Save	Time of Game	Attendance	Series	Box/ Streak

Legend: = Win = Loss = Postponement
Bold = Angels team member

== Player stats ==
=== Batting ===
==== Starters by position ====
Note: Pos = Position; G = Games played; AB = At bats; H = Hits; Avg. = Batting average; HR = Home runs; RBI = Runs batted in

Pos	Player	G	AB	H	Avg.	HR	RBI
C	Bob Boone	144	442	98	.222	7	49
1B	Wally Joyner	154	593	172	.290	22	100
2B	Bobby Grich	98	313	84	.268	9	30
SS	Dick Schofield	139	458	114	.249	13	57
3B	Doug DeCinces	140	512	131	.256	26	96
LF	Brian Downing	152	513	137	.267	20	95
CF	Gary Pettis	154	539	139	.258	5	58
RF	Ruppert Jones	126	393	90	.229	17	49
DH	Reggie Jackson	132	419	101	.241	18	58

==== Other batters ====
Note: G = Games played; AB = At bats; H = Hits; Avg. = Batting average; HR = Home runs; RBI = Runs batted in

Player	G	AB	H	Avg.	HR	RBI
Rob Wilfong	92	288	63	.219	3	33
George Hendrick	102	283	77	.272	14	47
Rick Burleson	93	271	77	.284	5	29
Jack Howell	63	151	41	.272	4	21
Jerry Narron	57	95	21	.221	1	8
Darrell Miller	33	57	13	.228	0	4
Devon White	29	51	12	.235	1	3
Mark Ryal	13	32	12	.375	2	5
Gus Polidor	6	19	5	.263	0	1
Mark McLemore	5	4	0	.000	0	0

=== Pitching ===
==== Starting pitchers ====
Note" G = Games pitched; IP = Innings pitched; W = Wins; L = Losses; ERA = Earned run average; SO = Strikeouts

Player	G	IP	W	L	ERA	SO
Mike Witt	34	269.0	18	10	2.84	208
Kirk McCaskill	34	246.1	17	10	3.36	202
Don Sutton	34	207.0	15	11	3.74	116
Ron Romanick	18	106.1	5	8	5.50	38
John Candelaria	16	92.0	10	2	2.55	81
Jim Slaton	14	73.1	4	6	5.65	31
Ray Chadwick	7	27.1	0	5	7.24	9
Willie Fraser	1	4.1	0	0	8.31	2

==== Other pitchers ====
Note: G = Games pitched; IP = Innings pitched; W = Wins; L = Losses; ERA = Earned run average; SO = Strikeouts

Player	G	IP	W	L	ERA	SO
Vern Ruhle	16	47.2	1	3	4.15	23
Urbano Lugo	6	21.1	1	1	3.80	9
Mike Cook	5	9.0	0	2	9.00	6

==== Relief pitchers ====
Note: G = Games pitched; W = Wins; L = Losses; SV = Saves; ERA = Earned run average; SO = Strikeouts

Player	G	W	L	SV	ERA	SO
Donnie Moore	49	4	5	21	2.97	53
Doug Corbett	46	4	2	10	3.66	36
Terry Forster	41	4	1	5	3.51	28
Gary Lucas	27	4	1	2	3.15	31
Chuck Finley	25	3	1	0	3.30	37
T.R. Bryden	16	2	1	0	6.55	25
Ken Forsch	10	0	1	1	9.53	13
Todd Fischer	9	0	0	0	4.24	7

== ALCS ==
Game	Score	Date	Location	Attendance
1	California – 8, Boston – 1	October 7	Fenway Park	32,993
2	California – 2, Boston – 9	October 8	Fenway Park	32,786
3	Boston – 3, California – 5	October 10	Anaheim Stadium	64,206
4	Boston – 3, California – 4 (11 innings)	October 11	Anaheim Stadium	64,223
5	Boston – 7, California – 6 (11 innings)	October 12	Anaheim Stadium	64,223
6	California – 4, Boston – 10	October 14	Fenway Park	32,998
7	California – 1, Boston – 8	October 15	Fenway Park	33,001

== Farm system ==
Level	Team	League	Manager
AAA	Edmonton Trappers	Pacific Coast League	Winston Llenas
AA	Midland Angels	Texas League	Joe Maddon
A	Palm Springs Angels	California League	Tom Kotchman
A	Quad Cities Angels	Midwest League	Bill Lachemann
A-Short Season	Salem Angels	Northwest League	Bruce Hines

Records
Preceded by 1985	California Angels seasons 1986	Succeeded by 1987
