= 1986 Kansas City Royals season =

1986 Kansas City Royals
- League: American League
- Division: West
- Ballpark: Royals Stadium
- City: Kansas City, Missouri
- Record: 76–86 (.469)
- Divisional place: 3rd
- Owners: Ewing Kauffman
- General managers: John Schuerholz
- Managers: Dick Howser (games 1-88); Mike Ferraro (interim, games 89-162)
- Television: WDAF-TV (Denny Matthews, Denny Trease, Fred White)
- Radio: WIBW (AM) (Denny Matthews, Fred White)

The 1986 Kansas City Royals season the 18th season in Royals franchise history, and they entered the season as the defending World Series champions. It involved the Royals finishing third in the American League West with a record of 76 wins and 86 losses.

== Regular season ==
=== Season standings ===
AL West
| Team | W | L | Pct. | GB | Home | Road |
|---|---|---|---|---|---|---|
| California Angels | 92 | 70 | .568 | — | 50‍–‍32 | 42‍–‍38 |
| Texas Rangers | 87 | 75 | .537 | 5 | 51‍–‍30 | 36‍–‍45 |
| Kansas City Royals | 76 | 86 | .469 | 16 | 45‍–‍36 | 31‍–‍50 |
| Oakland Athletics | 76 | 86 | .469 | 16 | 47‍–‍36 | 29‍–‍50 |
| Chicago White Sox | 72 | 90 | .444 | 20 | 41‍–‍40 | 31‍–‍50 |
| Minnesota Twins | 71 | 91 | .438 | 21 | 43‍–‍38 | 28‍–‍53 |
| Seattle Mariners | 67 | 95 | .414 | 25 | 41‍–‍41 | 26‍–‍54 |

=== Record vs. opponents ===
1986 American League record Sources:
| Team | BAL | BOS | CAL | CWS | CLE | DET | KC | MIL | MIN | NYY | OAK | SEA | TEX | TOR |
|---|---|---|---|---|---|---|---|---|---|---|---|---|---|---|
| Baltimore | — | 4–9 | 6–6 | 9–3 | 4–9 | 1–12 | 6–6 | 6–7 | 8–4 | 5–8 | 5–7 | 6–6 | 5–7 | 8–5 |
| Boston | 9–4 | — | 5–7 | 7–5 | 10–3 | 7–6 | 6–6 | 6–6 | 10–2 | 5–8 | 7–5 | 8–4 | 8–4 | 7–6 |
| California | 6–6 | 7–5 | — | 7–6 | 6–6 | 7–5 | 8–5 | 5–7 | 7–6 | 7–5 | 10–3 | 8–5 | 8–5 | 6–6 |
| Chicago | 3–9 | 5–7 | 6–7 | — | 5–7 | 6–6 | 7–6 | 5–7 | 6–7 | 6–6 | 7–6 | 8–5 | 2–11 | 6–6 |
| Cleveland | 9–4 | 3–10 | 6–6 | 7–5 | — | 4–9 | 8–4 | 8–5 | 6–6 | 5–8 | 10–2 | 9–3 | 6–6 | 3–10–1 |
| Detroit | 12–1 | 6–7 | 5–7 | 6–6 | 9–4 | — | 5–7 | 8–5 | 7–5 | 6–7 | 6–6 | 6–6 | 7–5 | 4–9 |
| Kansas City | 6–6 | 6–6 | 5–8 | 6–7 | 4–8 | 7–5 | — | 6–6 | 6–7 | 4–8 | 8–5 | 5–8 | 8–5 | 5–7 |
| Milwaukee | 7–6 | 6–6 | 7–5 | 7–5 | 5–8 | 5–8 | 6–6 | — | 4–8 | 8–5 | 5–7 | 6–6 | 4–8 | 7–6 |
| Minnesota | 4–8 | 2–10 | 6–7 | 7–6 | 6–6 | 5–7 | 7–6 | 8–4 | — | 4–8 | 6–7 | 6–7 | 6–7 | 4–8 |
| New York | 8–5 | 8–5 | 5–7 | 6–6 | 8–5 | 7–6 | 8–4 | 5–8 | 8–4 | — | 5–7 | 8–4 | 7–5 | 7–6 |
| Oakland | 7–5 | 5–7 | 3–10 | 6–7 | 2–10 | 6–6 | 5–8 | 7–5 | 7–6 | 7–5 | — | 10–3 | 3–10 | 8–4 |
| Seattle | 6–6 | 4–8 | 5–8 | 5–8 | 3–9 | 6–6 | 8–5 | 6–6 | 7–6 | 4–8 | 3–10 | — | 4–9 | 6–6 |
| Texas | 7–5 | 4–8 | 5–8 | 11–2 | 6–6 | 5–7 | 5–8 | 8–4 | 7–6 | 5–7 | 10–3 | 9–4 | — | 5–7 |
| Toronto | 5–8 | 6–7 | 6–6 | 6–6 | 10–3–1 | 9–4 | 7–5 | 6–7 | 8–4 | 6–7 | 4–8 | 6–6 | 7–5 | — |

=== Notable transactions ===
- March 28, 1986: Joe Beckwith was released by the Kansas City Royals.
- May 21, 1986: Mark Huismann was traded by the Royals to the Seattle Mariners for Terry Bell.
- June 2, 1986: 1986 Major League Baseball draft
  - Bo Jackson was drafted by the Royals in the 4th round.
  - Torey Lovullo was drafted by the Royals in the 27th round, but did not sign.
- August 16, 1986: Jacob Brumfield was signed as a free agent by the Royals.

=== Notable events ===
- July 15, 1986: Dick Howser resigned as Royals' manager after managing for the American League in the 1986 Major League Baseball All-Star Game. Howser admitted he felt sick before the game and was having trouble with signals during the game. He was later diagnosed with brain cancer and underwent surgery. Mike Ferraro took over as manager for the remainder of the season. Howser died following complications of a brain tumor in June 1987.

=== Roster ===
1986 Kansas City Royals roster
Roster
| Pitchers: 28 Scott Bankhead; 40 Bud Black; 13 David Cone; 26 Steve Farr; 23 Mark Gubicza; 50 Alan Hargesheimer; 38 Mark Huismann; 25 Danny Jackson; 37 Charlie Leibrandt; 22 Dennis Leonard; 29 Dan Quisenberry; 31 Bret Saberhagen; 38 Steve Shields | Catchers: 34 Terry Bell; 9 Jamie Quirk; 8 Jim Sundberg; Infielders: 45 Steve Balboni; 1 Buddy Biancalana; 5 George Brett; 36 Rondin Johnson; 32 Bill Pecota; 4 Greg Pryor; 2 Ángel Salazar; 33 Kevin Seitzer; 20 Frank White | Outfielders: 17 Mike Brewer; 16 Bo Jackson; 35 Lynn Jones; 27 Mike Kingery; 7 Rudy Law; 24 Darryl Motley; 21 Lonnie Smith; 15 Dwight Taylor; 6 Willie Wilson; Other batters: 11 Hal McRae; 3 Jorge Orta | Manager: 41 Mike Ferraro; 10 Dick Howser; Coaches: 43 Gary Blaylock; 41 Mike Ferraro; 42 José Martínez; 14 Lee May; 44 Jimmie Schaffer |

== Player stats ==
| = Indicates team leader |

=== Batting ===
==== Starters by position ====
Note: Pos = position; G = Games played; AB = At bats; H = Hits; Avg. = Batting average; HR = Home runs; RBI = Runs batted in

| Pos | Player | G | AB | H | Avg. | HR | RBI |
|---|---|---|---|---|---|---|---|
| C | Jim Sundberg | 140 | 429 | 91 | .212 | 12 | 42 |
| 1B | Steve Balboni | 138 | 512 | 117 | .229 | 29 | 88 |
| 2B | Frank White | 151 | 566 | 154 | .272 | 22 | 84 |
| SS | Ángel Salazar | 117 | 298 | 73 | .245 | 0 | 24 |
| 3B | George Brett | 124 | 441 | 128 | .290 | 16 | 73 |
| LF | Lonnie Smith | 134 | 508 | 146 | .287 | 8 | 44 |
| CF | Willie Wilson | 156 | 631 | 170 | .269 | 9 | 44 |
| RF | Darryl Motley | 72 | 217 | 44 | .203 | 7 | 20 |
| DH | Jorge Orta | 106 | 336 | 93 | .277 | 9 | 46 |

==== Other batters ====
Note: G = Games played; AB = At bats; H = Hits; Avg. = Batting average; HR = Home runs; RBI = Runs batted in

| Player | G | AB | H | Avg. | HR | RBI |
|---|---|---|---|---|---|---|
| Rudy Law | 87 | 307 | 80 | .261 | 1 | 36 |
| Hal McRae | 112 | 278 | 70 | .252 | 7 | 37 |
| Jamie Quirk | 80 | 219 | 47 | .215 | 8 | 26 |
| Mike Kingery | 62 | 209 | 54 | .258 | 3 | 14 |
| Buddy Biancalana | 100 | 190 | 46 | .242 | 2 | 8 |
| Greg Pryor | 63 | 112 | 19 | .170 | 0 | 7 |
| Kevin Seitzer | 28 | 96 | 31 | .323 | 2 | 11 |
| Bo Jackson | 25 | 82 | 17 | .207 | 2 | 9 |
| Lynn Jones | 67 | 47 | 6 | .128 | 0 | 1 |
| Rondin Johnson | 11 | 31 | 8 | .258 | 0 | 2 |
| Bill Pecota | 12 | 29 | 6 | .207 | 0 | 2 |
| Mike Brewer | 12 | 18 | 3 | .167 | 0 | 0 |
| Terry Bell | 8 | 3 | 0 | .000 | 0 | 0 |
| Dwight Taylor | 4 | 2 | 0 | .000 | 0 | 0 |

=== Pitching ===
==== Starting pitchers ====
Note: G = Games pitched; IP = Innings pitched; W = Wins; L = Losses; ERA = Earned run average; SO = Strikeouts

| Player | G | IP | W | L | ERA | SO |
|---|---|---|---|---|---|---|
| Charlie Leibrandt | 35 | 231.1 | 14 | 11 | 4.09 | 108 |
| Dennis Leonard | 33 | 192.2 | 8 | 13 | 4.44 | 114 |
| Danny Jackson | 32 | 186.0 | 11 | 12 | 3.20 | 115 |
| Mark Gubicza | 35 | 180.2 | 12 | 6 | 3.64 | 118 |
| Bret Saberhagen | 30 | 156.0 | 7 | 12 | 4.15 | 112 |
| Scott Bankhead | 24 | 121.0 | 8 | 9 | 4.61 | 94 |

==== Other pitchers ====
Note: G = Games pitched; IP = Innings pitched; W = Wins; L = Losses; ERA = Earned run average; SO = Strikeouts

| Player | G | IP | W | L | ERA | SO |
|---|---|---|---|---|---|---|
| Alan Hargesheimer | 5 | 13.0 | 0 | 1 | 6.23 | 4 |

==== Relief pitchers ====
Note: G = Games pitched; W = Wins; L = Losses; SV = Saves; ERA = Earned run average; SO = Strikeouts

| Player | G | W | L | SV | ERA | SO |
|---|---|---|---|---|---|---|
| Dan Quisenberry | 62 | 3 | 7 | 12 | 2.77 | 36 |
| Bud Black | 56 | 5 | 10 | 9 | 3.20 | 68 |
| Steve Farr | 56 | 8 | 4 | 8 | 3.13 | 83 |
| David Cone | 11 | 0 | 0 | 0 | 5.56 | 21 |
| Mark Huismann | 10 | 0 | 1 | 1 | 4.15 | 13 |
| Steve Shields | 3 | 0 | 0 | 0 | 2.08 | 2 |

== Awards and honors ==
- George Brett, Lou Gehrig Award
- Dennis Leonard, Hutch Award

== Farm system ==
| Level | Team | League | Manager |
|---|---|---|---|
| AAA | Omaha Royals | American Association | John Boles and Frank Funk |
| AA | Memphis Chicks | Southern League | Tommy Jones |
| A | Fort Myers Royals | Florida State League | Duane Gustavson |
| A-Short Season | Eugene Emeralds | Northwest League | Ed Napoleon |
| Rookie | GCL Royals | Gulf Coast League | Luis Silverio |
