= List of Kansas City Royals managers =

The Kansas City Royals are a franchise based in Kansas City, Missouri. They are members of the Central division of Major League Baseball's American League. The Royals franchise was formed in 1969.

There have been 20 managers for the Royals. Joe Gordon became the first manager of the Kansas City Royals in 1969, serving for one season. Bob Lemon became the first manager who held the title of manager for the Royals for more than one season. Ned Yost has managed more games than any other Royals manager and as many seasons as Dick Howser and Tony Muser. Whitey Herzog, Jim Frey, Howser, and Ned Yost are the only managers to have led the Royals into the playoffs. Three Royals managers—Gordon, Lemon, and Herzog—have been inducted into the Baseball Hall of Fame;

In 1970, Gordon was replaced with Charlie Metro. The Royals made their first playoff appearance under Herzog. Four managers have led the Royals into the postseason. Dick Howser led the Royals to their first World Series Championship in 1985. Ned Yost led the Royals into two World Series appearances, in the 2014 World Series, and a Win in the 2015 World Series. Frey, led the Royals to One world series appearance in the 1980 World Series. The highest winning percentage of any manager who managed at least one season was Herzog, with a percentage of .574. The lowest percentage was Bob Schaefer in 2005, although he managed for only 17 games. The lowest percentage of a manager with at least one season with the Royals was Buddy Bell, the manager from 2005 through the 2007 season with a percentage of .399.

The highest win total for a Royals manager is held by Yost, who also holds the record for losses. Tony Peña became the first Royals manager to win the Manager of the Year award, in 2003. Ned Yost was hired on May 13, 2010, after Trey Hillman was fired. Yost retired from coaching following the 2019 season, ending a 10-year tenure with Kansas City. Mike Matheny was hired as the new manager for the 2020 season in October 2019.

== Table key ==
WPct	Winning percentage: number of wins divided by number of games managed
PA	Playoff appearances: number of years this manager has led the franchise to the playoffs
PW	Playoff wins: number of wins this manager has accrued in the playoffs
PL	Playoff losses: number of losses this manager has accrued in the playoffs
WS	World Series: number of World Series victories achieved by this manager
†	Elected to the National Baseball Hall of Fame

== Managers ==
Statistics current through 2026 season

#^{[a]}	Image	Manager	Seasons	Wins	Losses	WPct	PA	PW	PL	WS	Reference(s)
1		Joe Gordon^{†}	1969	69	93	.426	—	—	—	—	
2		Charlie Metro	1970	19	33	.365	—	—	—	—	
3		Bob Lemon^{†}	1970–1972	207	218	.487	—	—	—	—	
4		Jack McKeon	1973–1975	215	205	.512	—	—	—	—	
5		Whitey Herzog^{†}	1975–1979	410	304	.574	3	5	9	0	
6		Jim Frey	1980–1981	127	105	.547	1	5	4	0	
7		Dick Howser	1981–1986	404	365	.525	3	8	12	1	
8		Mike Ferraro	1986	36	38	.486	—	—	—	—	
9		Billy Gardner	1987	62	64	.492	—	—	—	—	
10		John Wathan	1987–1991	287	270	.515	—	—	—	—	
11		Bob Schaefer	1991	1	0	1.000	—	—	—	—	
12		Hal McRae	1991–1994	286	277	.508	—	—	—	—	
13		Bob Boone	1995–1997	181	206	.468	—	—	—	—	
14		Tony Muser	1997–2002	317	431	.424	—	—	—	—	
15		John Mizerock	2002	5	8	.385	—	—	—	—	
16		Tony Peña	2002–2005	198	285	.410	—	—	—	—	
—		Bob Schaefer	2005	5	12	.294	—	—	—	—	
17		Buddy Bell	2005–2007	174	262	.399	—	—	—	—	
18		Trey Hillman	2008–2010	152	207	.423	—	—	—	—	
19		Ned Yost	2010–2019	687	736	.483	2	22	9	1	
20		Mike Matheny	2020–2022	165	219	.430	—	—	—	—	
21		Matt Quatraro	2023–present	293	355	.452	1	3	3	0	
Totals				4300	4693	.478	10	43	37	2	

== Notes ==
- ^{A} A running total of the number of managers of the Royals. Thus, any manager who has two or more separate terms is counted only once.
