= Ron Shepherd =

American baseball player (born 1960)

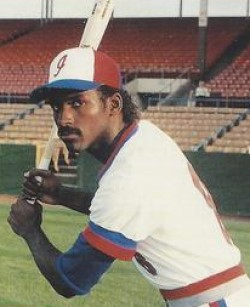
- Outfielder
- Born: October 27, 1960 (age 65); Longview, Texas, U.S.
- Batted: Right Threw: Right

MLB debut
- September 5, 1984, for the Toronto Blue Jays

Last MLB appearance
- October 5, 1986, for the Toronto Blue Jays

MLB statistics
- Batting average: .167
- Home runs: 2
- Runs batted in: 5
- Stats at Baseball Reference

Teams
- Toronto Blue Jays (1984–1986)

Ronald Wayne Shepherd (born October 27, 1960) is an American former professional baseball player. The former outfielder played part of three seasons in Major League Baseball, from 1984 until 1986, for the Toronto Blue Jays; his pro career lasted 15 years (1979–93), including four years in the Mexican League. The native of Longview, Texas, stood 6 feet 4 inches (1.93 m) tall, weighed 175 pounds (79 kg), and threw and batted right-handed.

== Career ==
Shepherd was selected by Toronto in the second round of the 1979 Major League Baseball draft out of Kilgore High School. During the closing month of the 1984 season, the Blue Jays recalled Shepherd from the Triple-A Syracuse Chiefs, and during his big league debut he appeared in 12 games, nine as a pinch runner. He was hitless in four plate appearances. Shepherd split 1985 between Toronto and Syracuse, and got into 38 games with the Blue Jays, but had only four hits in 35 at bats. Then, in 1986, he was recalled from Syracuse in late May and spent the last four months of the season on the Toronto roster. He collected 14 hits in 69 at bats, for a .203 batting average, with four doubles and his only two MLB home runs.

In 115 major league games, Shepherd had only 114 plate appearances, highlighting his extensive use as a pinch runner. He scored 23 runs, stole three bases (with one caught stealing), and had 18 total hits. Shepherd walked five times and had 37 strikeouts.

== Sources ==
- Career statistics from Baseball Reference · Baseball Reference (Minors) · Retrosheet · Baseball Almanac, or Retrosheet
