= Mike Brewer (baseball) =

American baseball player (born 1959)

- Right fielder
- Born: October 24, 1959 (age 66); Shreveport, Louisiana, U.S.
- Batted: Right Threw: Right

MLB debut
- June 11, 1986, for the Kansas City Royals

Last MLB appearance
- July 2, 1986, for the Kansas City Royals

MLB statistics
- Batting average: .167 (3-for-18)
- Games played: 12
- Stats at Baseball Reference

Teams
- Kansas City Royals (1986)

Michael Quinn Brewer (born October 24, 1959) is an American former professional baseball outfielder.

Brewer's professional career spanned 1979 to 1986, most of it in Minor League Baseball. He briefly played in Major League Baseball (MLB), appearing in 12 games for the 1986 Kansas City Royals. His brother Tony Brewer also played in MLB.
