= 1986 New York Yankees season =

Season for the Major League Baseball team the New York Yankees

1986 New York Yankees
- League: American League
- Division: East
- Ballpark: Yankee Stadium
- City: New York City
- Record: 90-72 (.556)
- Owners: George Steinbrenner
- General managers: Clyde King
- Managers: Lou Piniella
- Television: WPIX (Phil Rizzuto, Bill White, Jim Kaat, Billy Martin); SportsChannel NY (Mel Allen, Mickey Mantle, others from WPIX)
- Radio: WABC (AM) (Bill White, Phil Rizzuto, Spencer Ross, Bobby Murcer)

The 1986 New York Yankees season was the 84th season for the Yankees. The team finished with a record of 90–72, finishing in second-place, 5.5 games behind the Boston Red Sox. New York was managed by Lou Piniella. The Yankees played at Yankee Stadium.

== Offseason ==
- November 7, 1985: Bob Geren was signed as a free agent by the Yankees.
- December 6, 1985: Billy Sample was traded by the Yankees to the Atlanta Braves for Miguel Sosa (minors).
- December 12, 1985: Ron Hassey and Joe Cowley were traded by the Yankees to the Chicago White Sox for Britt Burns, Glen Braxton (minors), and Mike Soper (minors).
- December 12, 1985: Rex Hudler was traded by the Yankees with Rich Bordi to the Baltimore Orioles for a player to be named later and Gary Roenicke. The Baltimore Orioles sent Leo Hernández (December 16, 1985) to the Yankees to complete the trade.
- December 14, 1985: Roger Maris, the Yankees record holder for most home runs in one season died from lymphatic cancer.
- February 13, 1986: Neil Allen, Scott Bradley, Glen Braxton (minors), and cash were traded by the Yankees to the Chicago White Sox for Ron Hassey, Matt Winters, Chris Alvarez (minors) and Eric Schmidt (minors).
- March 28, 1986: Don Baylor was traded by the Yankees to the Boston Red Sox for Mike Easler.

== Regular season ==
- Don Mattingly became the sixth player in Major League history to have at least 230 hits, 100 RBIs, and 30 home runs in a season. He holds the distinction of being the first American Leaguer to reach that milestone.
- Don Mattingly became the first Yankee since Lou Gehrig to have three consecutive seasons of 200 hits.
- Dave Winfield became the first Yankee since Joe DiMaggio to achieve five straight 100 RBI seasons. DiMaggio did it from 1936 to 1942.
- Willie Randolph became the all-time Yankee leader for games played at second base. The previous record holder was Tony Lazzeri. Lazzeri held the record with 1,446 games.
- Mark McGwire made his Major League debut on August 22, 1986, in a game versus the Yankees. He had three at-bats and no hits.

=== Notable transactions ===
- May 2, 1986: Tommy John signed as a free agent with the New York Yankees.
- June 2, 1986: 1986 Major League Baseball draft
  - Andy Stankiewicz was drafted by the Yankees in the 12th round. Player signed June 10, 1986.
  - Kevin Maas was drafted by the Yankees in the 22nd round. Player signed July 20, 1986.
- June 30, 1986: Ken Griffey, Sr. and Andre Robertson were traded by the Yankees to the Atlanta Braves for Claudell Washington and Paul Zuvella.
- July 4, 1986: Ozzie Canseco was released by the Yankees.
- July 9, 1986: Ed Whitson was traded by the Yankees to the San Diego Padres for Tim Stoddard.
- July 30, 1986: Ron Hassey, Carlos Martínez and a player to be named later were traded by the Yankees to the Chicago White Sox for Ron Kittle, Wayne Tolleson, and Joel Skinner. The Yankees completed the deal by sending Bill Lindsey to the White Sox on December 24.

=== Season standings ===
This was the first season since 1904 that the Yankees finished second in the standings to the Red Sox. Then, the Yankees were known as the Highlanders and the Red Sox were the Americans.

AL East
| Team | W | L | Pct. | GB | Home | Road |
|---|---|---|---|---|---|---|
| Boston Red Sox | 95 | 66 | .590 | — | 51‍–‍30 | 44‍–‍36 |
| New York Yankees | 90 | 72 | .556 | 5½ | 41‍–‍39 | 49‍–‍33 |
| Detroit Tigers | 87 | 75 | .537 | 8½ | 49‍–‍32 | 38‍–‍43 |
| Toronto Blue Jays | 86 | 76 | .531 | 9½ | 42‍–‍39 | 44‍–‍37 |
| Cleveland Indians | 84 | 78 | .519 | 11½ | 45‍–‍35 | 39‍–‍43 |
| Milwaukee Brewers | 77 | 84 | .478 | 18 | 41‍–‍39 | 36‍–‍45 |
| Baltimore Orioles | 73 | 89 | .451 | 22½ | 37‍–‍42 | 36‍–‍47 |

=== Record vs. opponents ===
1986 American League record Sources:
| Team | BAL | BOS | CAL | CWS | CLE | DET | KC | MIL | MIN | NYY | OAK | SEA | TEX | TOR |
|---|---|---|---|---|---|---|---|---|---|---|---|---|---|---|
| Baltimore | — | 4–9 | 6–6 | 9–3 | 4–9 | 1–12 | 6–6 | 6–7 | 8–4 | 5–8 | 5–7 | 6–6 | 5–7 | 8–5 |
| Boston | 9–4 | — | 5–7 | 7–5 | 10–3 | 7–6 | 6–6 | 6–6 | 10–2 | 5–8 | 7–5 | 8–4 | 8–4 | 7–6 |
| California | 6–6 | 7–5 | — | 7–6 | 6–6 | 7–5 | 8–5 | 5–7 | 7–6 | 7–5 | 10–3 | 8–5 | 8–5 | 6–6 |
| Chicago | 3–9 | 5–7 | 6–7 | — | 5–7 | 6–6 | 7–6 | 5–7 | 6–7 | 6–6 | 7–6 | 8–5 | 2–11 | 6–6 |
| Cleveland | 9–4 | 3–10 | 6–6 | 7–5 | — | 4–9 | 8–4 | 8–5 | 6–6 | 5–8 | 10–2 | 9–3 | 6–6 | 3–10–1 |
| Detroit | 12–1 | 6–7 | 5–7 | 6–6 | 9–4 | — | 5–7 | 8–5 | 7–5 | 6–7 | 6–6 | 6–6 | 7–5 | 4–9 |
| Kansas City | 6–6 | 6–6 | 5–8 | 6–7 | 4–8 | 7–5 | — | 6–6 | 6–7 | 4–8 | 8–5 | 5–8 | 8–5 | 5–7 |
| Milwaukee | 7–6 | 6–6 | 7–5 | 7–5 | 5–8 | 5–8 | 6–6 | — | 4–8 | 8–5 | 5–7 | 6–6 | 4–8 | 7–6 |
| Minnesota | 4–8 | 2–10 | 6–7 | 7–6 | 6–6 | 5–7 | 7–6 | 8–4 | — | 4–8 | 6–7 | 6–7 | 6–7 | 4–8 |
| New York | 8–5 | 8–5 | 5–7 | 6–6 | 8–5 | 7–6 | 8–4 | 5–8 | 8–4 | — | 5–7 | 8–4 | 7–5 | 7–6 |
| Oakland | 7–5 | 5–7 | 3–10 | 6–7 | 2–10 | 6–6 | 5–8 | 7–5 | 7–6 | 7–5 | — | 10–3 | 3–10 | 8–4 |
| Seattle | 6–6 | 4–8 | 5–8 | 5–8 | 3–9 | 6–6 | 8–5 | 6–6 | 7–6 | 4–8 | 3–10 | — | 4–9 | 6–6 |
| Texas | 7–5 | 4–8 | 5–8 | 11–2 | 6–6 | 5–7 | 5–8 | 8–4 | 7–6 | 5–7 | 10–3 | 9–4 | — | 5–7 |
| Toronto | 5–8 | 6–7 | 6–6 | 6–6 | 10–3–1 | 9–4 | 7–5 | 6–7 | 8–4 | 6–7 | 4–8 | 6–6 | 7–5 | — |

=== Roster ===
1986 New York Yankees
Roster
| Pitchers: 36 Mike Armstrong; 62 Brad Arnsberg; 34,62 Doug Drabek; 54 Brian Fisher; 49 Ron Guidry; 36,56 Al Holland; 25 Tommy John; 26 John Montefusco; 31 Joe Niekro; 41 Scott Nielsen; 47 Alfonso Pulido; 45 Dennis Rasmussen; 19 Dave Righetti; 28 Rod Scurry; 29 Bob Shirley; 33,43 Tim Stoddard; 35 Bob Tewksbury; 38 Ed Whitson | Catchers: 58 Juan Espino; 12 Ron Hassey; 12 Joel Skinner; 27 Butch Wynegar; Infielders: 2 Dale Berra; 26 Iván DeJesús; 22 Mike Fischlin; 38 Leo Hernández; 26 Bryan Little; 23 Don Mattingly; 20 Bob Meacham; 13 Mike Pagliarulo; 30 Willie Randolph; 2 Wayne Tolleson; 26 Paul Zuvella | Outfielders: 46 Henry Cotto; 17 Mike Easler; 33 Ken Griffey; 24 Rickey Henderson; 33 Ron Kittle; 50 Phil Lombardi; 21 Dan Pasqua; 11 Gary Roenicke; 18 Claudell Washington; 31 Dave Winfield | Manager: 14 Lou Piniella; Coaches: 48 Joe Altobelli; 41 Sammy Ellis; 42 Stump Merrill; 40 Gene Michael; 44 Jeff Torborg; 6 Roy White |

=== Billy Martin ===
Billy Martin's number 1 was retired by the New York Yankees in 1986.

On August 10, 1986, the Yankees retired Martin's uniform number 1 and dedicated a plaque in his honor for Monument Park at Yankee Stadium. The plaque contains the words, There has never been a greater competitor than Billy. Martin told the crowd, "I may not have been the greatest Yankee to put on the uniform, but I am the proudest."

On May 24, 1986, on the season finale of Saturday Night Live, co-host Martin was "fired" by executive producer Lorne Michaels for being "drunk" in a skit, slurring his lines. During the goodnights, Martin "sets fire" to the dressing room in retaliation. (Only three cast members would be re-hired the next season.) In 1988, on Saturday Night Live's Weekend Update, comedian Dennis Miller opened the sports with, "In Calgary tonight, Katarina Witt won the gold medal in figure skating, prompting Yankees owner George Steinbrenner to fire manager Billy Martin."

== Player stats ==
| = Indicates team leader |

| = Indicates league leader |

=== Batting ===
==== Starters by position ====
Note: Pos = Position; G = Games played; AB = At bats; H = Hits; R = Runs; Avg. = Batting average; HR = Home runs; RBI = Runs batted in; SB = Stolen Bases

| Pos | Player | G | AB | H | R | Avg. | HR | RBI | SB |
|---|---|---|---|---|---|---|---|---|---|
| C | Butch Wynegar | 61 | 194 | 40 | 19 | .206 | 7 | 29 | 0 |
| 1B | Don Mattingly | 162 | 677 | 238 | 117 | .352 | 31 | 113 | 0 |
| 2B | Willie Randolph | 141 | 492 | 136 | 76 | . 276 | 5 | 50 | 15 |
| 3B | Mike Pagliarulo | 149 | 504 | 120 | 71 | .238 | 28 | 71 | 4 |
| SS | Wayne Tolleson | 60 | 215 | 61 | 22 | .284 | 0 | 14 | 4 |
| LF | Dan Pasqua | 102 | 280 | 82 | 44 | .293 | 16 | 45 | 2 |
| CF | Rickey Henderson | 153 | 608 | 160 | 130 | .263 | 28 | 74 | 87 |
| RF | Dave Winfield | 154 | 565 | 148 | 90 | .262 | 24 | 104 | 6 |
| DH | Mike Easler | 146 | 490 | 148 | 64 | .302 | 14 | 78 | 3 |

==== Other batters ====
Note: G = Games played; AB = At bats; H = Hits; Avg. = Batting average; HR = Home runs; RBI = Runs batted in

| Player | G | AB | H | Avg. | HR | RBI |
|---|---|---|---|---|---|---|
| Ken Griffey, Sr. | 59 | 198 | 60 | .303 | 9 | 26 |
| Ron Hassey | 64 | 191 | 57 | .298 | 6 | 29 |
| Joel Skinner | 54 | 166 | 43 | .259 | 1 | 17 |
| Bobby Meacham | 56 | 161 | 36 | .224 | 0 | 10 |
| Gary Roenicke | 69 | 136 | 36 | .265 | 3 | 18 |
| Claudell Washington | 54 | 135 | 32 | .237 | 6 | 16 |
| Dale Berra | 42 | 108 | 25 | .231 | 2 | 13 |
| Mike Fischlin | 71 | 102 | 21 | .206 | 0 | 3 |
| Henry Cotto | 35 | 80 | 17 | .213 | 1 | 6 |
| Ron Kittle | 30 | 80 | 19 | .238 | 4 | 12 |
| Paul Zuvella | 21 | 48 | 4 | .083 | 0 | 2 |
| Bryan Little | 14 | 41 | 8 | .195 | 0 | 0 |
| Juan Espino | 27 | 37 | 6 | .162 | 0 | 5 |
| Phil Lombardi | 20 | 36 | 10 | .278 | 2 | 6 |
| Leo Hernández | 7 | 22 | 5 | .227 | 1 | 4 |
| Iván DeJesús | 7 | 4 | 0 | .000 | 0 | 0 |

=== Pitching ===
==== Starting pitchers ====
Note: G = Games pitched; IP = Innings pitched; W = Wins; L = Losses; ERA = Earned run average; SO = Strikeouts

| Player | G | IP | W | L | ERA | SO |
|---|---|---|---|---|---|---|
| Dennis Rasmussen | 31 | 202.0 | 18 | 6 | 3.88 | 131 |
| Ron Guidry | 30 | 192.1 | 9 | 12 | 3.98 | 140 |
| Doug Drabek | 27 | 131.2 | 7 | 8 | 4.10 | 76 |
| Bob Tewksbury | 23 | 130.1 | 9 | 5 | 3.31 | 49 |
| Joe Niekro | 25 | 125.2 | 9 | 10 | 4.87 | 59 |
| Tommy John | 13 | 70.2 | 5 | 3 | 2.93 | 28 |
| Scott Nielsen | 10 | 56.0 | 4 | 4 | 4.02 | 20 |

==== Other pitchers ====
Note: G = Games pitched; IP = Innings pitched; W = Wins; L = Losses; SV = Saves; ERA = Earned run average; SO = Strikeouts

| Player | G | IP | W | L | SV | ERA | SO |
|---|---|---|---|---|---|---|---|
| Tim Stoddard | 24 | 49.1 | 4 | 1 | 0 | 3.83 | 34 |
| Ed Whitson | 14 | 37.0 | 5 | 2 | 0 | 7.54 | 27 |
| Alfonso Pulido | 10 | 30.2 | 1 | 1 | 1 | 4.70 | 13 |
| John Montefusco | 4 | 12.1 | 0 | 0 | 0 | 2.19 | 3 |
| Mike Armstrong | 7 | 8.2 | 0 | 1 | 0 | 9.35 | 8 |
| Brad Arnsberg | 2 | 8.0 | 0 | 0 | 0 | 3.38 | 3 |

==== Relief pitchers ====
Note: G = Games pitched; IP = Innings pitched; W = Wins; L = Losses; SV = Saves; ERA = Earned run average; SO = Strikeouts

| Player | G | IP | W | L | SV | ERA | SO |
|---|---|---|---|---|---|---|---|
| Dave Righetti | 74 | 106.2 | 8 | 8 | 46 | 2.45 | 83 |
| Brian Fisher | 62 | 96.2 | 9 | 5 | 6 | 4.93 | 67 |
| Bob Shirley | 39 | 105.1 | 0 | 4 | 3 | 5.04 | 64 |
| Rod Scurry | 31 | 39.1 | 1 | 2 | 2 | 3.66 | 36 |
| Al Holland | 25 | 40.2 | 1 | 0 | 0 | 5.09 | 37 |

== Awards and records ==
- Rickey Henderson – American League Leader Stolen Bases (87)
- Rickey Henderson – American League Leader Runs Scored (130)
- Don Mattingly – American League Leader Hits (238)
- Don Mattingly, Silver Slugger Award
- Don Mattingly, Yankees Single Season Record, Hits in a Season (238)
- Don Mattingly, Yankees Single Season Record, Doubles in a Season (53)
- Dave Righetti, Major League Record (since broken), Most Saves in One Season by a Relief Pitcher(46)
- Dave Righetti, Major League Record, Most Saves in One Season by a Left-handed Pitcher(46)

All-Star Game

- Rickey Henderson, starting lineup, outfield
- Dave Winfield, starting lineup, outfield
- Don Mattingly, reserve, first baseman
- Dave Righetti, reserve, pitcher

== Farm system ==
| Level | Team | League | Manager |
|---|---|---|---|
| AAA | Columbus Clippers | International League | Barry Foote |
| AA | Albany-Colonie Yankees | Eastern League | Jim Saul |
| A | Fort Lauderdale Yankees | Florida State League | Bucky Dent |
| A-Short Season | Oneonta Yankees | New York–Penn League | Buck Showalter |
| Rookie | GCL Yankees | Gulf Coast League | Fred Ferreira |
