= Todd Fischer =

Todd Fischer may refer to:

- Todd Fischer (baseball)
- Todd Fischer (golfer)
