= José Martínez (infielder/coach) =

Cuban baseball player (1942–2014)

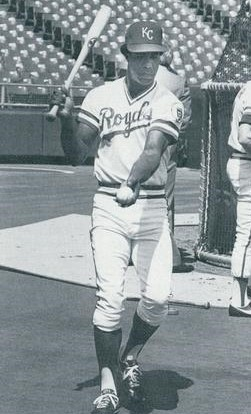
- Martínez, circa 1982
- Second baseman
- Born: July 26, 1942; Cárdenas, Cuba
- Died: October 1, 2014 (aged 72); Orlando, Florida, U.S.
- Batted: Right Threw: Right

MLB debut
- June 18, 1969, for the Pittsburgh Pirates

Last MLB appearance
- May 28, 1970, for the Pittsburgh Pirates

MLB statistics
- Batting average: .245
- Home runs: 1
- Runs batted in: 16
- Stats at Baseball Reference

Teams
- As player: Pittsburgh Pirates (1969–1970); As coach: Kansas City Royals (1980–1987); Chicago Cubs (1988–1994)

Career highlights and awards
- World Series champion (1985)

José Martínez Azcuis (July 26, 1942 – October 1, 2014) was a Cuban-born professional baseball player, coach, executive and scout. As a player, he appeared in 96 Major League Baseball (MLB) games during 1969 and 1970 for the Pittsburgh Pirates, primarily as a second baseman. Martínez threw and batted right-handed and was listed as 6 feet 0 inches (1.83 m) and 178 pounds (81 kg).

== Biography ==
Born in Cárdenas in Matanzas Province, Martínez attended La Progresiva High School in his native city and signed with the Pittsburgh Pirates in 1961. In 1969, he made his major-league debut; his 77 games played included 34 starts at second base, third on the club behind Bill Mazeroski and Gene Alley, the Pirates' former starting shortstop. On September 8, Martínez hit his only major league home run, a ninth-inning grand slam off Claude Raymond of the Montreal Expos that delivered the winning runs in a 6–2 Pittsburgh victory at Jarry Park Stadium.

Late in May 1970, Martínez returned to the minor leagues, where he spent the remainder of his playing career. He was acquired by the Kansas City Royals' organization in 1972, beginning a 16-year-long association with the club. He managed in the Royals' farm system during 1976–1979 and then joined the team's MLB coaching staff. Working under managers Jim Frey, Dick Howser, Mike Ferraro, Billy Gardner and John Wathan for eight seasons (1980–1987), he was with the team for their 1980 American League championship and 1985 World Series championship. In 1988, Martínez joined the Chicago Cubs, reunited with Frey, then the Cubs' general manager. He spent seven years as a member of the Cubs' coaching staff, working for four different managers.

In 1995, John Schuerholz, who had been farm system director and then general manager of the Royals during Martínez' tenure in Kansas City, brought Martínez to the Atlanta Braves' front office as his special assistant, and Martínez worked for the Braves for 20 years until his death on October 1, 2014.
