= Phil Lombardi =

American baseball player (1963–2021)

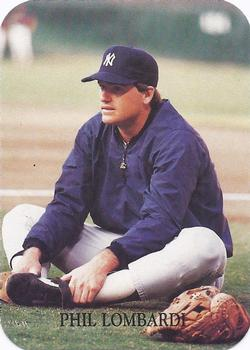
- Catcher
- Born: February 20, 1963; Abilene, Texas
- Died: May 20, 2021 (aged 58); Stevenson Ranch, California
- Batted: Right Threw: Right

MLB debut
- April 26, 1986, for the New York Yankees

Last MLB appearance
- October 1, 1989, for the New York Mets

MLB statistics
- Batting average: .239
- Home runs: 3
- Runs batted in: 9
- Stats at Baseball Reference

Teams
- New York Yankees (1986–1987); New York Mets (1989)
Medals
Men's baseball
Representing United States
World Junior Baseball Championship
Silver medal – second place	1981 Newark	Team

Phillip Arden Lombardi (February 20, 1963 – May 20, 2021) was an American baseball catcher who played three seasons in Major League Baseball (MLB). He played for the New York Yankees and New York Mets from 1986 to 1989. Although his primary position was catcher, Lombardi played left field as well.

== Early life ==
Lombardi was born in Abilene, Texas, on February 20, 1963. He attended John F. Kennedy High School in Granada Hills, Los Angeles. He was drafted by the New York Yankees in the 3rd round of the 1981 MLB draft.

== Professional career ==
Lombardi played five seasons in the minor leagues from 1981 to 1985. He made his MLB debut on April 26, 1986, at the age of 23, entering as a defensive replacement for Ron Hassey behind the plate in the fifth inning. On his first fielding chance, he committed a throwing error on a stolen base attempt by Brett Butler, and went hitless in his first two at bats in a 3–2 loss to the Cleveland Indians. In his first season, Lombardi posted a .278 batting average with two home runs and six runs batted in (RBI), and did not commit any more errors behind the plate (though he did have two in left field). He played just five major league games the following year, hitting one single in eight at bats for a .125 average.

Lombardi was traded to the New York Mets with Steve Frey and Darren Reed on December 11, 1987, for Rafael Santana and Victor Garcia. He spent two seasons with their Triple-A affiliate, the Tidewater Tides. He made only eighteen appearances with the major league team in 1989, batting .229 with one home run and three RBIs. He played his final major league game on October 1 that same year, at the age of 26. Lombardi was claimed on waivers by the Atlanta Braves on April 4, 1990, before announcing his retirement five days later.

== Later life ==
After retiring from baseball, Lombardi worked as a real estate agent and helped establish the Valencia office of Pinnacle Estate Properties. He also coached Little League in Santa Clarita, California.

Lombardi was married to Marilyn until his death. Together, they had three daughters. He died from complications related to brain cancer on May 20, 2021, in Stevenson Ranch, California. He was 58.
