= Joe Johnson (baseball) =

American baseball player (born 1961)

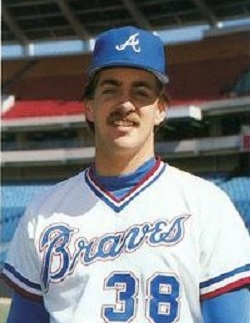
- Pitcher
- Born: October 30, 1961 (age 64); Brookline, Massachusetts, U.S.
- Batted: Right Threw: Right

MLB debut
- July 25, 1985, for the Atlanta Braves

Last MLB appearance
- June 21, 1987, for the Toronto Blue Jays

MLB statistics
- Win–loss record: 20–18
- Earned run average: 4.48
- Strikeouts: 149
- Stats at Baseball Reference

Teams
- Atlanta Braves (1985–1986); Toronto Blue Jays (1986–1987)

Joseph Richard Johnson (born October 30, 1961) is an American former right-handed starting pitcher in Major League Baseball who played for the Atlanta Braves and Toronto Blue Jays from 1985 to 1987.

== Amateur career ==
A native of Brookline, Massachusetts, Johnson attended the University of Maine. In 1980 and 1981, he played collegiate summer baseball with the Yarmouth–Dennis Red Sox of the Cape Cod Baseball League and was named a league all-star in 1981. Johnson was drafted by the Atlanta Braves in the second round of the 1982 MLB draft.

== Professional career ==
Johnson made his debut with the Braves in 1985, compiling a record of 4–4 with a 4.10 earned-run average. He had a solid 1986 season, going 13–9 with both the Braves and the Toronto Blue Jays, to whom he was traded on July 6 for fellow pitcher Jim Acker.

Johnson had a subpar 1987 in Toronto, and was featured in a Sports Illustrated article for their "One Day in Baseball" issue. An issue entirely focused on each of the Major League Baseball games of June 21, 1987 where a sportswriter was assigned to each game played that day and had to write an article about their day, whether it be action in the field or in the stands. Some features included a fan catching his first foul ball, coverage from inside the Green Monster in Fenway Park, and a rare inside the park grand slam in Oakland. For the Toronto game, Peter Gammons spent the day with Johnson, the scheduled starting pitcher for that day, and his family. Johnson had been struggling for the Blue Jays that year and in the game gave up three runs in three innings raising his ERA for the season to 5.13, but avoided the loss as the Blue Jays came back to win the game 7–6. Johnson was sent down to the minors after the game. It was expected to be a short-term demotion so that he could work on his mechanics, but it turned out to be the last time he would ever pitch in the majors. He remained in the minor leagues until 1990 when he retired.
