= Terry Bell (baseball) =

American baseball player (born 1962)

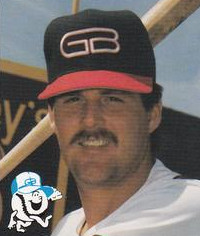
- Bell in 1988

Wilmington Quakers
- Catcher / Coach
- Born: October 27, 1962 (age 63); Dayton, Ohio, U.S.
- Batted: Right Threw: Right

MLB debut
- September 3, 1986, for the Kansas City Royals

Last MLB appearance
- September 15, 1987, for the Atlanta Braves

MLB statistics
- Batting average: .000
- At-bats: 4
- Games played: 9
- Stats at Baseball Reference

Teams
- Kansas City Royals (1986); Atlanta Braves (1987)

Terence William Bell (born October 27, 1962) is an American former Major League Baseball catcher. He was the first round selection of the Seattle Mariners in the 1983 Major League Baseball draft, two selections ahead of Roger Clemens.

Bell was originally drafted by the Oakland Athletics in the sixth round of the 1980 Major League Baseball draft as a senior at Fairmont East High School in Kettering, Ohio, but opted to attend Old Dominion University in Norfolk, Virginia instead. While attending Old Dominion, he participated in the 1982 Amateur World Series and the 1983 Pan American Games. When the Monarchs won the Sun Belt East Division Championship in 1983, he was named a Sporting News All-American and the Sun Belt Conference MVP.

Bell was considered the top defensive catcher in the draft when the Mariners selected Bell with the seventeenth overall pick in 1983. However, he batted just .176 in his first professional season for the Midwest League's Wausau Timbers, and displayed very little power. In three seasons in the Mariners' organization, he batted .233 with two home runs and 64 runs batted in. On May 21, 1986, he was dealt to the Kansas City Royals for relief pitcher Mark Huismann.

With the Royals, Bell received a September call-up in 1986. He appeared in eight games, and went hitless in five plate appearances with two walks. On September 3, 1987, after spending the entire 1987 season in the minors with the Memphis Chicks, he was the player to be named later in a mid-season deal with the Atlanta Braves for reliever Gene Garber. He appeared in one game for the Braves, and struck out pinch hitting for Ed Olwine.

He continued to play minor league ball for the Braves through 1989. In seven minor league seasons, he batted .231 with eight home runs and 136 RBIs.
