= Ray Chadwick =

American baseball player (born 1962)

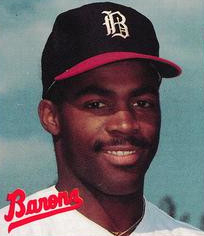
- Chadwick in 1988

Thompson Rivers WolfPack
- Starting pitcher / Coach
- Born: November 17, 1962 (age 64); Durham, North Carolina, U.S.
- Batted: Switch Threw: Right

MLB debut
- July 29, 1986, for the California Angels

Last MLB appearance
- September 30, 1986, for the California Angels

MLB statistics
- Win–loss record: 0–5
- Strikeouts: 9
- Earned run average: 7.24
- Stats at Baseball Reference

Teams
- California Angels (1986)

Ray Charles Chadwick (born November 17, 1962) is an American former professional baseball player who played one season for the California Angels of Major League Baseball (MLB).

Chadwick attended Durham High School in Durham, North Carolina and Winston-Salem State University where he played college football for the Rams. In the offseasons, he played semi-professional baseball where he caught the attention of a California Angels scout who signed him to a contract.

On February 12, 1989, Chadwick was driving his car when he was hit head-on by a drunk driver. He was left with two broken vertebrae in his neck, two broken ribs, a cracked sternum and a broken non-throwing arm or wrist. His friend who was a passenger in the car suffered a cracked skull. He spent six weeks in a hospital bed and was told by doctors that he would probably not pitch that year but was back to pitching in the minors by July 1989.

After retirement from active play, Ray was the pitching coach for the University of British Columbia Thunderbirds from 1998 to 2000.

Ray now resides in Kamloops, British Columbia, Canada where he is coaching the Thompson Rivers University baseball team from 2003–present. Ray has won the Canadian College Baseball Conference Championship in both 2005 and 2007. During the summer Ray also coaches the Kamloops Sun Devils baseball team for junior aged players (19–21).

Ray is the father of professional soccer player Sydney Leroux.
