= T. R. Bryden =

American baseball player (born 1959)

- Pitcher
- Born: January 17, 1959 (age 66); Moses Lake, Washington, U.S.
- Batted: Right Threw: Right

MLB debut
- April 10, 1986, for the California Angels

Last MLB appearance
- June 8, 1986, for the California Angels

MLB statistics
- Win–loss record: 2–1
- Earned run average: 6.55
- Strikeouts: 25
- Stats at Baseball Reference

Teams
- California Angels (1986)

Thomas Ray Bryden (born January 17, 1959) is an American former professional baseball player who played one season for the California Angels of Major League Baseball (MLB) in 1986.

Bryden attended Gonzaga University, where he played college baseball for the Bulldogs from 1980 to 1981.
