= Todd Fischer (baseball) =

American baseball player (born 1960)

- Relief pitcher
- Born: September 15, 1960 (age 65); Columbus, Ohio, U.S.
- Batted: Right Threw: Right

MLB debut
- May 29, 1986, for the California Angels

Last MLB appearance
- July 10, 1986, for the California Angels

MLB statistics
- Win–loss record: 0-0
- Earned run average: 4.24
- Strikeouts: 7
- Stats at Baseball Reference

Teams
- California Angels (1986)

Todd Richard Fischer (born September 15, 1960) is an American former professional baseball player who played part of one season for the California Angels of Major League Baseball (MLB). He holds the unusual distinction of losing a game without throwing a pitch: in a July 10, 1986 game against the Boston Red Sox, he balked home a runner in the bottom of the 12th inning immediately after entering the game. He would never again pitch in a major league game.
