= Ron Romanick =

American baseball player and coach (born 1960)

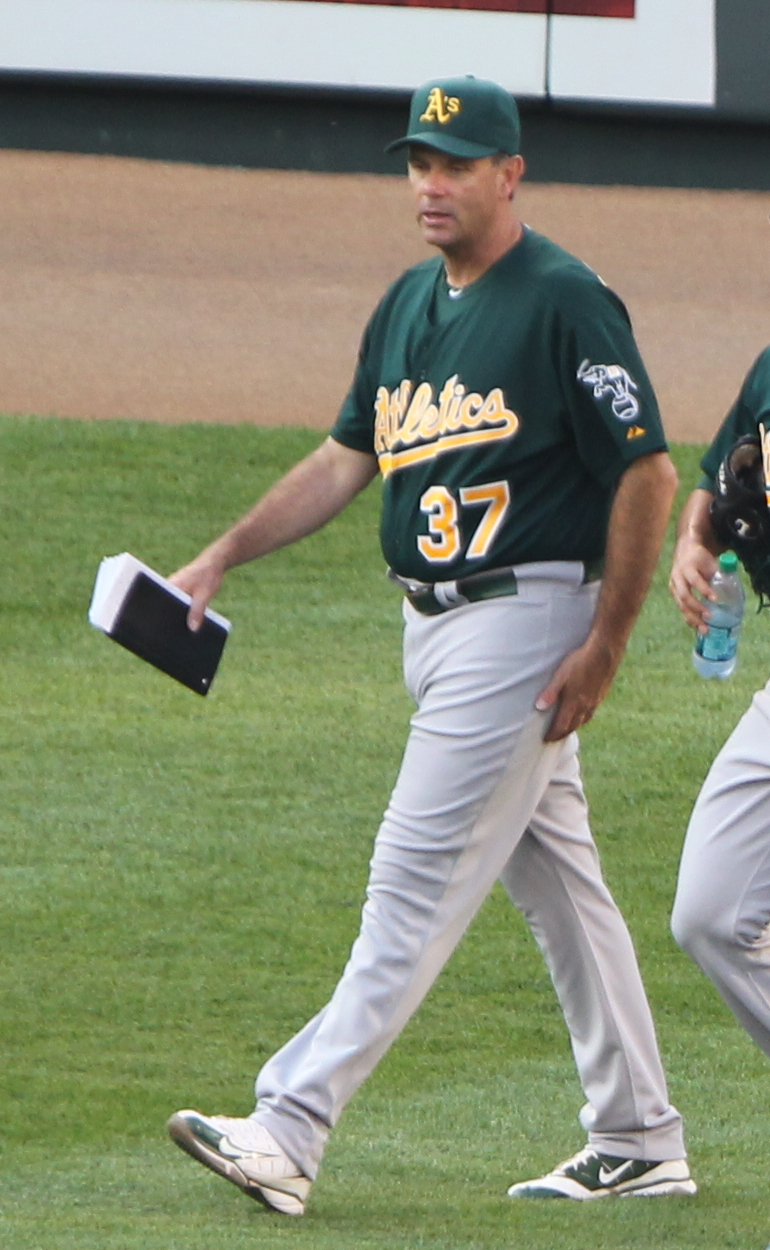
- Romanick as pitching coach for the Oakland Athletics in 2011
- Pitcher
- Born: November 6, 1960 (age 65); Burley, Idaho, U.S.
- Batted: Right Threw: Right

MLB debut
- April 5, 1984, for the California Angels

Last MLB appearance
- July 21, 1986, for the California Angels

MLB statistics
- Win–loss record: 31–29
- Earned run average: 4.24
- Strikeouts: 189
- Stats at Baseball Reference

Teams
- California Angels (1984–1986)

Ronald James Romanick (born November 6, 1960) is an American professional baseball pitcher and pitching coach. He is the minor league pitching coordinator for the New York Mets organization. Romanick played in Major League Baseball (MLB) for the California Angels from 1984 through 1986. In 2011, he was the Oakland Athletics' pitching coach.

== Early years ==
Romanick graduated from Newport High School in Bellevue, Washington in 1979. He was drafted by the Toronto Blue Jays in the third round of the 1979 Major League Baseball draft, but did not sign, choosing instead to attend Arizona State University, where he played for the Arizona State Sun Devils baseball team. He was drafted again in 1980, this time by the San Diego Padres, in the first round (seventh overall) of the June Secondary amateur draft, but again did not sign.

Romanick finally said yes to the California Angels, who drafted him in the first round (fourth overall) of the 1981 January Secondary Draft. He spent three seasons in their minor league system, compiling a 30-25 record and 3.89 earned run average in 71 starts.

== Playing career ==
He won a roster spot with the Angels out of Spring training 1984, going 12-12 with a 3.76 ERA his rookie season. He improved to 14-9 in 1985. Perhaps the biggest game Romanick ever pitched was on October 2, 1985 against the Kansas City Royals. Having once had a 6.5 game lead in their division, the Angels found themselves just one game up on the Kansas City Royals in the American League West when they headed to Royals Stadium for a four-game set on September 30. The Royals won the game on a three hit performance by Bud Black, and went on to win the division by a game.

After finishing second to Kansas City in Romanick's first two seasons in the big leagues, the Angels finally captured their division in 1986, however, Romanick had not pitched for the major league club since July 21, and was left off the post-season roster.

Following the 1986 season, he was traded with a player to be named later (who would be Alan Mills) to the New York Yankees for Butch Wynegar. He spent the entire 1987 season with the Yankees' triple A affiliate, the Columbus Clippers, where he went 5-8 with a 5.16 ERA. He spent the following season in the Milwaukee Brewers organization before retiring.

== Coaching career ==
Romanick worked as a minor league pitching coordinator and coach with the Seattle Mariners organization from 1992 through 1998. He worked as minor league roving pitching instructor for the Athletics from 1999 through 2007. On October 17, 2007, the A's promoted Romanick to the parent club as their bullpen coach, replacing Brad Fischer.

On November 1, 2010, Romanick was named the pitching coach for the Athletics when Curt Young left to become the new pitching coach for the Boston Red Sox. Romanick was not retained after the 2011 season as manager Bob Melvin opted to have coaches of his own. The New York Mets hired Romanick as their minor league pitching coordinator in December 2011.

| Preceded by Brad Fischer | Oakland Athletics bullpen coach 2008–2010 | Succeeded by Rick Rodriguez |
| Preceded by Curt Young | Oakland Athletics pitching coach 2011 | Succeeded by Curt Young |
