= Rondin Johnson =

American baseball player (born 1958)

- Second baseman
- Born: December 16, 1958; Bremerton, Washington, U.S.
- Batted: Both Threw: Right

MLB debut
- September 3, 1986, for the Kansas City Royals

Last MLB appearance
- October 5, 1986, for the Kansas City Royals

MLB statistics
- Batting average: .258
- Home runs: 0
- Runs batted in: 2
- Stats at Baseball Reference

Teams
- Kansas City Royals (1986)

Rondin Allen Johnson (born December 16, 1958) is an American former Major League Baseball player. He played with the Kansas City Royals of the American League. Johnson played second base in eleven games in 1986 with eight hits in 31 at-bats for a .258 batting average.

Johnson attended the University of Washington, where he played college baseball for the Huskies from 1978 to 1980.
