= Mark Huismann =

American baseball player (born 1958)

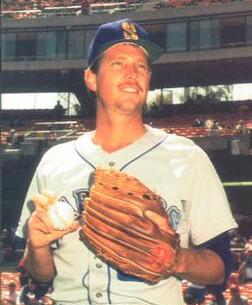
- Huismann with the Seattle Mariners c. 1987
- Relief pitcher
- Born: May 11, 1958 (age 68); Littleton, Colorado, U.S.
- Batted: Right Threw: Right

MLB debut
- August 16, 1983, for the Kansas City Royals

Last MLB appearance
- May 4, 1991, for the Pittsburgh Pirates

MLB statistics
- Win–loss record: 13–11
- Earned run average: 4.40
- Strikeouts: 219
- Stats at Baseball Reference

Teams
- Kansas City Royals (1983–1986); Seattle Mariners (1986–1987); Cleveland Indians (1987); Detroit Tigers (1988); Baltimore Orioles (1989); Pittsburgh Pirates (1990–1991)

Mark Lawrence Huismann (born May 11, 1958) is an American former Major League Baseball relief pitcher.

== Early years ==
Huismann was born in Littleton, Colorado, and attended Colorado State University upon graduation from Thomas B. Doherty High School in Colorado Springs. Shortly after his 21st birthday, he was drafted by the Chicago Cubs in the 23rd round of the 1979 Major League Baseball draft, but did not sign. After going undrafted in the 1980 Major League Baseball draft, he signed with the Kansas City Royals as an amateur free agent.

== Kansas City Royals ==
After four seasons in the minors, in which he compiled a 20–15 record with 49 saves and a 2.29 earned run average, Huismann made his major league debut on August 16, 1983 against the Detroit Tigers. Huismann drove his parents' car to the game and almost didn't make it, as the car overheated three times on the way to Royals Stadium. He made it in time to enter the game in the fifth inning. With runners on first and third and two outs, Huismann induced a fly ball to center from cleanup hitter Lance Parrish to end the threat. The Royals erupted for nine runs in the seventh to make a winner of Huismann in his debut.

Huismann began the 1984 season with the Royals, but after going 0–2 with a 6.75 ERA in 13 appearances, he was optioned back to the Triple-A Omaha Royals. He was far more effective when he returned in July, going 3–1 with a 2.79 ERA and three saves over the rest of the season. He made his only postseason appearance in Game 1 of the American League Championship Series against the Tigers.

Despite this progress, he did not make the Royals' roster for 1985. Instead, he compiled an American Association record 33 saves for Omaha to earn the league's Most Valuable Pitcher Award. He received a call-up to the majors when rosters expanded that September and was 1–0 with a 1.93 ERA in nine games, but was not part of the Royals' postseason roster.

== Seattle Mariners ==
With Dan Quisenberry in his prime, there was little room for a closer on the Royals. On May 21, 1986, Huismann was traded to the Seattle Mariners for catcher Terry Bell. He made his only career start for Seattle on July 21 against the Toronto Blue Jays. He was pulled in the fourth inning after having surrendered six runs (5 earned), and took the loss. Otherwise, he spent the rest of the season in a lefty/righty platoon with Matt Young closing games for Seattle. Huismann finished 14 games, picking up 4 saves.

== Cleveland Indians and retirement ==
He appeared in just six games for the Mariners in 1987 before being dealt to the Cleveland Indians for outfielder Dave Gallagher. He was 2–3 with two saves and a 5.09 ERA for the Indians when he was optioned down to the triple A Buffalo Bisons on July 15.

The Indians released Huismann during spring training the following season. Shortly afterwards, he signed with the Detroit Tigers.

Huismann pitched in all or part of nine seasons in the majors for six different teams from 1983 until 1991. Despite spending parts of nine seasons in the major leagues, Huismann pitched in more than 20 games in the majors just three times, spending more time at the minor league level than the majors in nearly every season (1986 being the only season during that stretch that he did not spend any time in the minors). In 1992 he played his final season of baseball for the Omaha Royals.

In 1995, he was a replacement player in spring training for the Kansas City Royals during the ongoing strike, attempting to comeback as a knuckleball pitcher.
