= Curt Young =

American baseball player and coach (born 1960)

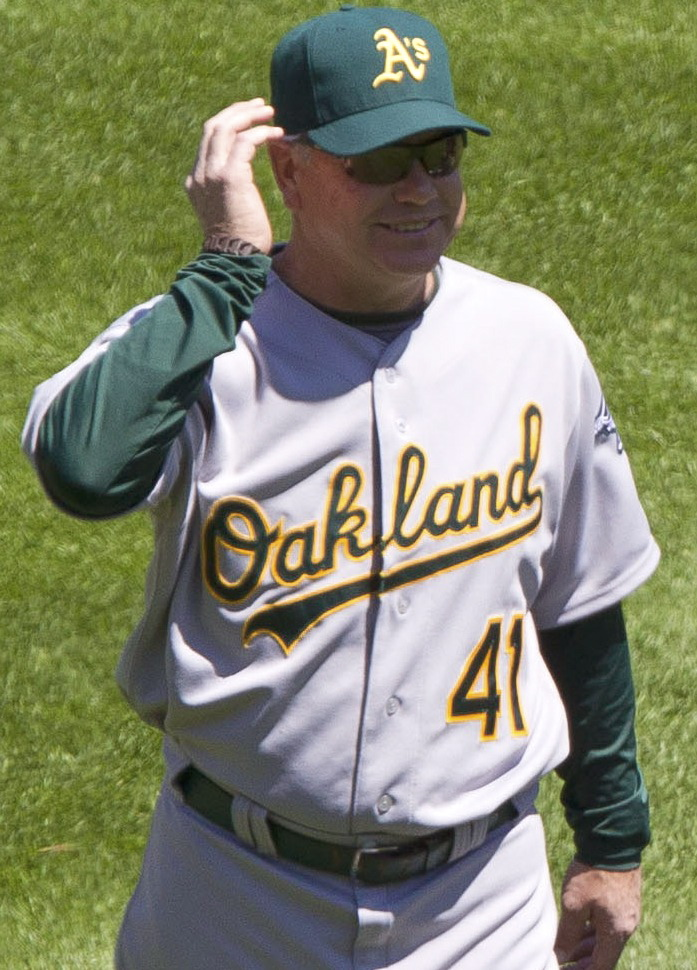
- Curt Young with the Oakland Athletics
- Pitcher
- Born: April 16, 1960 (age 66); Saginaw, Michigan, U.S.
- Batted: Right Threw: Left

MLB debut
- June 24, 1983, for the Oakland Athletics

Last MLB appearance
- July 5, 1993, for the Oakland Athletics

MLB statistics
- Win–loss record: 69–53
- Earned run average: 4.31
- Strikeouts: 536
- Stats at Baseball Reference

Teams
- As player: Oakland Athletics (1983–1991); Kansas City Royals (1992); New York Yankees (1992); Oakland Athletics (1993); As coach: Oakland Athletics (2004–2010); Boston Red Sox (2011); Oakland Athletics (2012–2017); San Francisco Giants (2018–2019)

Curtis Allen Young (born April 16, 1960) is an American former professional baseball pitcher and pitching coach. He played all or parts of 11 seasons in Major League Baseball (MLB) and previously served as the pitching coach for the Oakland Athletics and San Francisco Giants.

== Playing career ==
Young was drafted out of Central Michigan University by the Athletics in the fourth round of the 1981 draft. He joined the big league club in 1983 and played with the A's through the 1991 season, starting opening night for them in 1987. In 1992 he played for both the Kansas City Royals and New York Yankees before rejoining Oakland in 1993.

== Coaching career ==
Prior to his appointment as A's pitching coach in 2004, Young spent four seasons in the same capacity within the Oakland minor-league system. Young left the A's after the 2010 season, following an offer of a one-year contract.

On November 2, 2010, the Boston Red Sox announced he was hired to fill the team's vacant pitching coach position. In October 2011, following the Red Sox' September collapse, The Red Sox granted permission for Young and the other coaches to seek other opportunities. On October 21, Young was re-hired by the Oakland Athletics as their pitching coach after only one year in Boston. Young was relieved of his duties with the Athletics on June 15, 2017.

Preceded by Rick Peterson	Oakland Athletics pitching coach 2004–2010	Succeeded by Ron Romanick
Preceded by John Farrell	Boston Red Sox pitching coach 2011	Succeeded by Bob McClure
Preceded by Ron Romanick	Oakland Athletics pitching coach 2012–2017	Succeeded by Scott Emerson
Preceded by Dave Righetti	San Francisco Giants pitching coach 2018–2019	Succeeded by Andrew Bailey
