= Mike Ferraro =

American baseball player, coach, and manager (1944–2024)

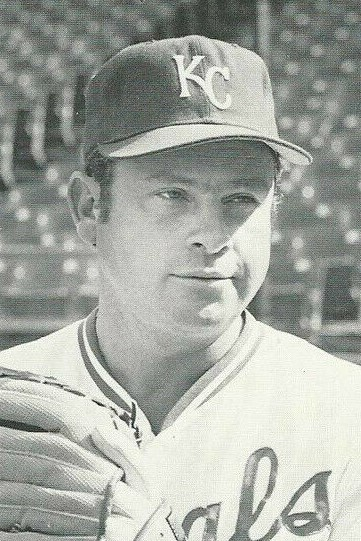
- Third baseman
- Born: August 18, 1944; Kingston, New York, U.S.
- Died: July 20, 2024 (aged 79); Las Vegas, Nevada, U.S.
- Batted: Right Threw: Right

MLB debut
- September 6, 1966, for the New York Yankees

Last MLB appearance
- October 4, 1972, for the Milwaukee Brewers

MLB statistics
- Batting average: .232
- Home runs: 2
- Runs batted in: 30
- Stats at Baseball Reference

Teams
- As player: New York Yankees (1966, 1968); Seattle Pilots/Milwaukee Brewers (1969, 1972); As coach: New York Yankees (1979–1982); Kansas City Royals (1984–1986); New York Yankees (1987–1991); Baltimore Orioles (1993); As manager: Cleveland Indians (1983); Kansas City Royals (1986)

Career highlights and awards
- World Series champion (1985)

Michael Dennis Ferraro (August 18, 1944 – July 20, 2024) was an American Major League Baseball third baseman. He played for the New York Yankees (1966; 1968) and the Seattle Pilots/Milwaukee Brewers (1969; 1972). Ferraro threw and batted right-handed, stood 5 feet 11 inches (1.80 m) tall and weighed 175 pounds (79 kg).

== Early life and amateur career ==
Ferraro attended Kingston High School in Kingston, New York, where he played baseball, basketball and football. As a senior in high school, he led all of Dutchess, Ulster, Sullivan, and Orange Counties with a .585 batting average on the baseball field and with 21.5 points per game on the basketball court.

== Professional playing career ==
Ferraro was originally signed as an amateur free agent by the Yankees, and he would have two MLB trials with New York. He was left unprotected in the 1968 expansion draft, and he was selected by the Seattle Pilots, but after only five games and four at-bats, he was traded to the Baltimore Orioles, where he spent two years in the minors.

However, in October 1971, Ferraro was traded back to the Brewers (the Pilots moved to Milwaukee after only one season in Seattle), where he would play his only season as a regular player. He played in 124 games during the 1972 season, batting .255 with two home runs and 29 RBI. He was dealt by the Brewers to the Minnesota Twins for Ken Reynolds on March 28, 1973, but was promptly released. He tried one last comeback with the Yankees in 1974, but he never made it back to the Majors.

== Managerial and coaching career ==
After his playing career ended, Ferraro turned to managing in the Yankee farm system in 1974, and he was highly successful in his five-year career (through 1978), winning pennants at the Class A, Double-A and Triple-A levels.

In 1979, he became the Yankees' third-base coach. Ferraro was involved in a controversial play during Game 2 of the 1980 American League Championship Series. Willie Randolph was on second base in the top of the eighth with two outs and the Yankees down by a run. Bob Watson hit a ball to the left field corner of Royals Stadium. The ball bounced right to Willie Wilson, but Wilson was not known for having a great arm, and Ferraro waved Randolph home. Wilson overthrew U L Washington, the cut-off man, but George Brett was in position behind him to catch the ball, then throw to Darrell Porter, who tagged out Randolph in a slide. TV cameras captured a furious George Steinbrenner fuming immediately after the play. The Yankees lost the game 3–2, then lost the series in three games. After the game, Steinbrenner publicly criticized Ferraro for the call.

Steinbrenner wanted Ferraro fired immediately, but manager Dick Howser stuck up for his coach and refused. Tommy John would write that, "By refusing to fire Ferraro, Howser sealed his fate as Yankee manager." Although Howser ultimately did not return to the Yankees in 1981, Ferraro remained with the team as a coach through the 1982 season. He coached for the Yankees again in 1987–1988 and 1990–1991.

Ferraro got his first MLB managerial job with the Cleveland Indians when he was hired to replace Dave Garcia on November 4, 1982. That winter, intermittent pain in his side caused Ferraro to undergo medical tests, and on February 9, 1983, he underwent surgery for removal of a cancerous left kidney. Ferraro, 38, was able to recover sufficiently to report to the Indians' Tucson, Arizona, spring training camp and on March 8, he helmed the team in its Cactus League opener. The 1983 Indians started slowly, then perked up in late April; by May 13 they were 17–14 and only 1½ games from the top in the AL East. But then they stumbled, losing 11 of 13, and never approached .500 again in June and July. Finally, after a 13-inning loss on July 30, Ferraro was fired. The Indians were 40–60 (.400), seventh and last in their division, and 19 games behind the Orioles when he departed.

Dick Howser, about to enter his third full season as manager of the Kansas City Royals, then hired Ferraro as his third-base coach in 1984—enabling Ferraro win a championship ring when the 1985 Royals defeated the St. Louis Cardinals in seven games in that year's World Series. But by mid-season 1986, Howser began to suffer from a sore neck and incidents of mental confusion; immediately after an impaired Howser managed the American League to its victory in the 1986 All-Star Game, he was hospitalized with a brain tumor. Cancer survivor Ferraro then took the Royals' reins as emergency manager. The team was already struggling at 40–48 when Howser stepped aside, and played at only a 36–38 pace under Ferraro for the rest of 1986. The Royals then dismissed Ferraro in October. His Major League managerial record was 76–98 over parts of two seasons.

Ferraro remained in baseball, returning to the Yankees' coaching staff; he also served as the third base coach of the Baltimore Orioles in 1993.

=== Managerial record ===
Team	Year	Regular season					Postseason			
Team	Year	Games	Won	Lost	Win %	Finish	Won	Lost	Win %	Result
CLE	1983	100	40	60	.400	fired	–	–	–	–
CLE total		100	40	60	.400		0	0	–	
KC	1986	74	36	38	.486	3rd in AL West	–	–	–	–
KC total		74	36	38	.486		0	0	–	
Total		174	76	98	.437		0	0	–	

== Death ==
Ferraro died in Las Vegas on July 20, 2024, at the age of 79.

Preceded by Dick Howser; Don Zimmer	New York Yankees third-base coach 1979–1980; 1987	Succeeded by Joe Altobelli; Clete Boyer
Preceded by Jeff Torborg; Stump Merrill; Pat Corrales	New York Yankees first-base coach 1981–1982; 1988; 1990–1991	Succeeded by Yogi Berra; Pat Corrales; Ed Napoleon
Preceded by Joe Nossek	Kansas City Royals third-base coach 1984–1986	Succeeded by Billy Gardner
Preceded by Cal Ripken Sr.	Baltimore Orioles third-base coach 1993	Succeeded by Jerry Narron
