= Dick Howser =

American baseball player and manager (1936–1987)

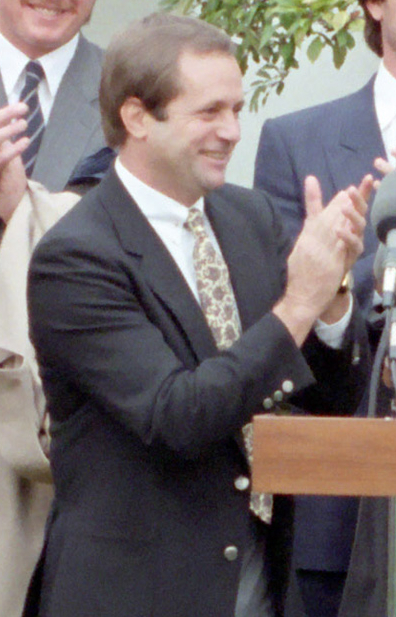
- Howser at the White House in 1985
- Shortstop / Manager
- Born: May 14, 1936; Miami, Florida, U.S.
- Died: June 17, 1987 (aged 51); Kansas City, Missouri, U.S.
- Batted: Right Threw: Right

MLB debut
- April 11, 1961, for the Kansas City Athletics

Last MLB appearance
- September 27, 1968, for the New York Yankees

MLB statistics
- Batting average: .248
- Home runs: 16
- Runs batted in: 165
- Managerial record: 507–425
- Winning %: .544
- Stats at Baseball Reference
- Managerial record at Baseball Reference

Teams
- As player: Kansas City Athletics (1961–1963); Cleveland Indians (1963–1966); New York Yankees (1967–1968); As manager: New York Yankees (1978, 1980); Kansas City Royals (1981–1986); As coach: New York Yankees (1969–1978)

Career highlights and awards
- 2× All-Star (1961, 1961²); 3× World Series champion (1977, 1978, 1985); Kansas City Royals No. 10 retired; Kansas City Royals Hall of Fame
Coaching career
Coaching career (HC unless noted)
1979	Florida State
Head coaching record
Overall	46–17–1
College Baseball Hall of Fame; Inducted in 2008

Richard Dalton Howser (May 14, 1936 – June 17, 1987) was an American Major League Baseball shortstop, coach, and manager who was best known as the manager of the Kansas City Royals during the 1980s and for guiding them to the franchise's first World Series title in 1985.

== Playing career ==
A native of Miami, Florida, Howser grew up in West Palm Beach, Florida; graduated from Palm Beach High School; and attended Florida State University. He was a member of the Sigma Nu fraternity. At Florida State, he received honors twice as an All-American shortstop and set a school record with a batting average of .422 in 1956. He signed with the Kansas City Athletics on June 13, 1958. He hit .280, stole 37 bases, scored 108 runs, and led American League shortstops in putouts and errors in his rookie season. For this he was selected to the 1961 All-Star team, and was named The Sporting News rookie of the year.

As his stats declined in the following two years, his only other season as a regular was with the Cleveland Indians in 1964. His major league career spanned eight seasons with three clubs – Kansas City Athletics, Cleveland Indians, and New York Yankees.

Tommy John played with Howser in Cleveland. He described the shortstop as "an aggressive, sparkplug type who'd lead both on and off the field...you could tell even then that Dick would make a fine manager."

== Managerial career ==
Immediately following his playing career, he was the third base coach with the Yankees for ten seasons (1969–1978). He then spent one year (1979) as head baseball coach at his alma mater, Florida State.

As a manager at the major league level, Howser never finished lower than second place during his seven-year managerial career.

=== New York Yankees (1978, 1980) ===
He made his debut in 1978, managing one game with the Yankees between Billy Martin's and Bob Lemon's first tours as skipper in the Bronx. In 1980, he returned from Florida State to become a full-time manager of the Yankees, taking them to the AL Eastern Division championship with a 103–59 record but losing three consecutive games to the Kansas City Royals in the playoffs; he was the fourth manager to win 100 games in his first full season as a manager.

Howser was one of the few Yankee managers who refused to let owner George Steinbrenner push him around. When Steinbrenner would call the manager's office before or after games while Howser was meeting with coaches or reporters, Howser would pick up the phone, say "I'm busy!", and hang up. Steinbrenner had a rule about facial hair, which Reggie Jackson would skirt around from time to time in 1980. Howser refused to correct Jackson because he thought Jackson's facial hair was unimportant given the year Jackson was having; however, Jackson later relented and shaved out of respect for Howser. For the most part, though, Howser was stricter in enforcing team rules, more so than Martin and Lemon had been, in Tommy John's opinion.

In Game 2 of the 1980 American League Championship Series, Yankee third base coach Mike Ferraro waved Willie Randolph home on a double by Bob Watson with two outs in the top of the eighth inning and the Yankees down 3–2. Randolph was thrown out at the plate on a relay throw by George Brett, prompting Steinbrenner to jump out of his seat and shout what appeared to be profanities on live national television. Steinbrenner wanted Ferraro fired on the spot after the game, but Howser refused. The Yankees lost the ALCS in three games, and Howser submitted his resignation on November 21, although it is generally felt that Steinbrenner actually fired him. Howser was the first manager to be fired/resign after leading a team to a 100 win season (incidentally, Steinbrenner had fired Howser's predecessor Billy Martin in the middle of the 1978 season after he had led the Yankees to a 100-win season the year before).

In the 2007 ESPN produced mini-series The Bronx Is Burning, Howser was portrayed by actor Max Casella.

=== Kansas City Royals (1981–1986) ===
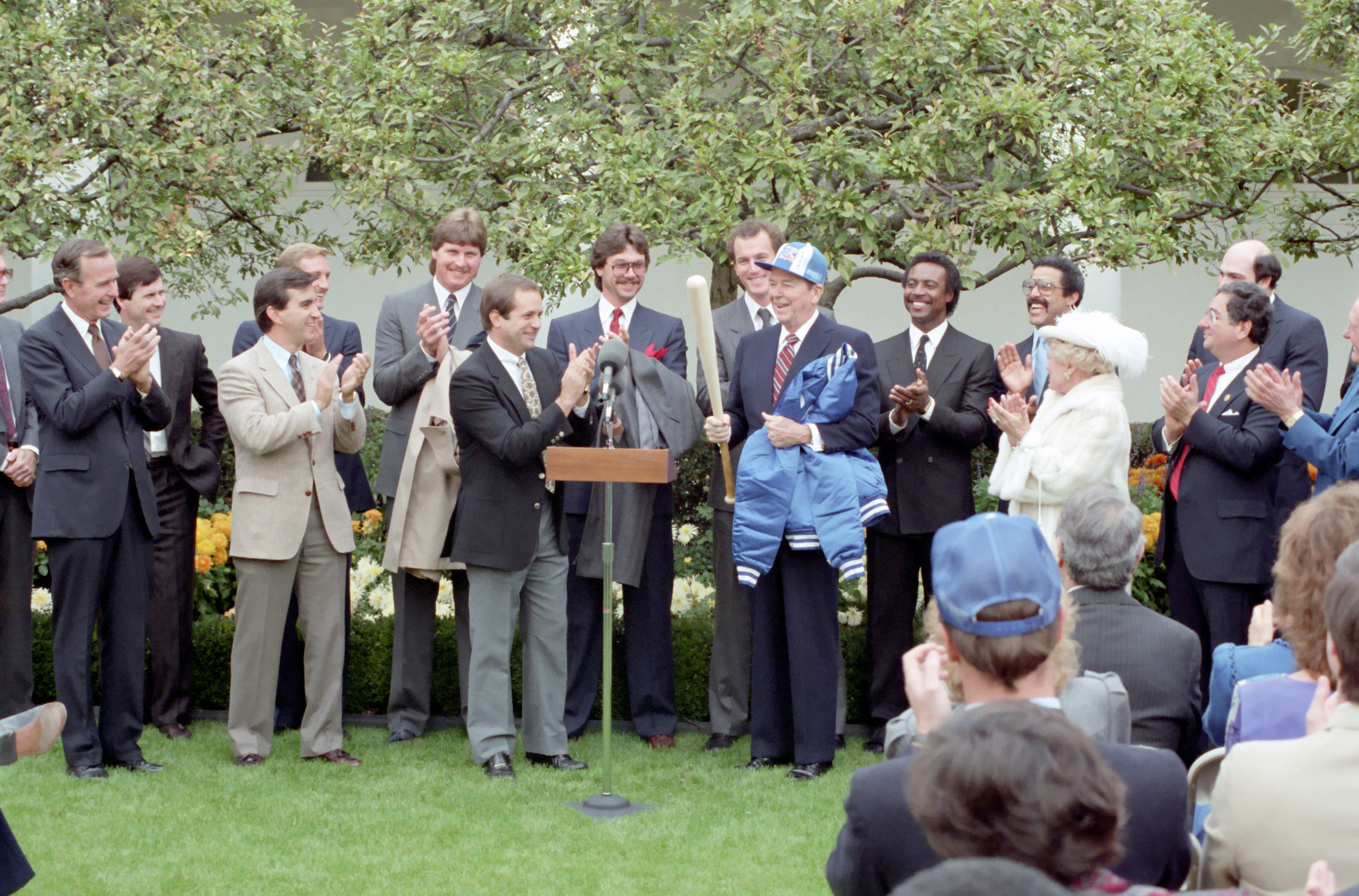
Howser (to left of podium) presents President Ronald Reagan with a Royals jacket, cap, and bat at the White House after their World Series victory.

The next year, Kansas City—his postseason rival on multiple occasions in previous seasons—hired Howser to manage the last 33 games of the strike-shortened 1981 season. Under Howser, the Royals finished second in 1982 and 1983. Prior to the 1984 season, with their clubhouse ravaged by drug problems, the Royals started disassembling their team and starting over. Kansas City expected 1984 to be a rebuilding year, but Howser guided the young team to a division title. The Royals were swept in 3 games by the eventual World Champion Detroit Tigers in the ALCS.

The following year, Howser guided the Royals to their first World Series title. The Royals reached the World Series by defeating the Toronto Blue Jays, four games to three, in the American League Championship Series, which was Toronto's first postseason appearance. The Royals then went on to defeat the heavily favored St. Louis Cardinals. In both the ALCS (the first year the League Championship Series was best-of-7) and World Series, the Royals won each series by overcoming a 3–1 deficit.

=== 1986 Major League Baseball All-Star Game ===
As manager of the defending AL champion Royals, Howser managed the 1986 All-Star Game at the Astrodome in Houston.

The AL won 3–2, starting a 37-year stretch that saw the junior circuit go 28–8–1 in the Mid-Summer Classic after going 2–21 from 1963 through 1985.

However, during the game, broadcasters on ABC noticed he was messing up signals when he changed pitchers, and Howser later admitted he felt sick before the game. It would be the last game he would manage, as he was diagnosed with a brain tumor and underwent surgery.

=== Managerial record ===
Team	Year	Regular season					Postseason			
Team	Year	Games	Won	Lost	Win %	Finish	Won	Lost	Win %	Result
NYY	1978	1	0	1	.000	interim	–	–	–	–
NYY	1980	162	103	59	.636	1st in AL East	0	3	.000	Lost ALCS (KC)
NYY total		163	103	60	.632		0	3	.000	
KC	1981	33	20	13	.606	1st in AL West	0	3	.000	Lost ALDS (OAK)
KC	1982	162	90	72	.556	2nd in AL West	–	–	–	–
KC	1983	162	79	83	.488	2nd in AL West	–	–	–	–
KC	1984	162	84	78	.519	1st in AL West	0	3	.000	Lost ALCS (DET)
KC	1985	162	91	71	.562	1st in AL West	8	6	.571	Won World Series (STL)
KC	1986	88	40	48	.455	retired	–	–	–	–
KC total		769	404	365	.525		8	12	.400	
Total		932	507	425	.544		8	15	.348	

== Death ==
Howser attempted a comeback during spring training of 1987 with the Royals, but he quickly found he was physically too weak and abandoned the attempt in late February when Billy Gardner took over. Three months later, he died at St. Luke's Hospital in Kansas City and was buried in Tallahassee, Florida. Two pitchers from his 1981 Royals team later died of brain cancer: Dan Quisenberry in 1998 and Ken Brett in 2003.

Howser was survived by his wife Nancy and twin daughters from a previous marriage.

=== Tributes ===
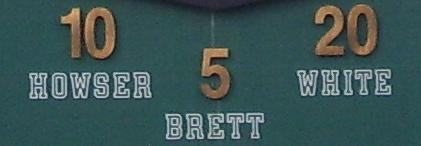
Howser's managerial number 10 was retired by the Royals alongside George Brett and Frank White.

On July 3, 1987, Howser's number 10 became the first number retired by the Kansas City Royals. Also that year, the St. Petersburg Area Chamber of Commerce established the Dick Howser Trophy, college baseball's equivalent of college football's Heisman Trophy, in Howser's honor.

Florida State University's baseball team plays on Mike Martin Field at Dick Howser Stadium, named in his honor, and he is honored with a bronze bust on the stadium grounds.

The Royals also commissioned a new bronze statue for their Outfield Experience to cap off the end of Kauffman Stadium renovations in 2009. The statue was revealed in a dedication ceremony on Opening Day, April 10, 2009.

== See also ==
- List of notable brain tumor patients

Preceded by Frankie Crosetti	New York Yankees third base coach 1969–1978	Succeeded by Mike Ferraro
