= 1986 Major League Baseball season =

1986 MLB season
- League: American League (AL); National League (NL)
- Sport: Baseball
- Duration: Regular season: April 7 – October 5, 1986; Postseason: October 7–27, 1986
- Games: 162
- Teams: 26 (14 AL, 12 NL)
- TV partner(s): ABC, NBC

Draft
- Top draft pick: Jeff King
- Picked by: Pittsburgh Pirates

Regular Season
- Season MVP: AL: Roger Clemens (BOS); NL: Mike Schmidt (PHI)

Postseason
- AL champions: Boston Red Sox
- AL runners-up: California Angels
- NL champions: New York Mets
- NL runners-up: Houston Astros

World Series
- Champions: New York Mets
- Runners-up: Boston Red Sox
- World Series MVP: Ray Knight (NYM)

MLB seasons
- ← 1985 1987 →

Locations of teams for the 1982–1988 American League seasons
West East
Locations of teams for the 1977–1992 National League seasons
West East

The 1986 major league baseball season began on April 7 while the regular season ended on October 5. The postseason began on October 7. The 83rd World Series then began on October 18 and concluded on October 27 with New York Mets of the National League defeating the Boston Red Sox of the American League, four games to three, to win their second title in franchise history.

The 57th All-Star Game was held on July 15 at the Astrodome, home of the Houston Astros. The American League won, 3–2.

== Schedule ==
The 1986 schedule consisted of 162 games for all 14 teams in the American League and 12 teams in the National League. Both leagues saw different schedule formats, as they had since 1977. The American League was split into two seven-team divisions. Each team was scheduled to play 13 games against their six division rivals, totaling 78 games, and 12 games against seven opponents, totaling 84 interdivision games. This format, used since 1979 would be used until the league realigned into three division for the 1994 season. Meanwhile, the National League was split into two six-team divisions. Each team was scheduled to play 18 games against their five division rivals, totaling 90 games, and 12 games against six interdivision opponents, totaling 72 games. This continued the format put in place since the 1969, and like the American League, would continue to be the format in use until 1993.

Opening Day took place on April 7, featuring 10 teams. The final day of the scheduled regular season was on October 5, featuring all 26 teams. The American League Championship Series took place between October 7 and October 15, while the National League Championship Series took place between October 8 and October 15. The World Series took place between October 18 and October 27.

== Rule change ==
The 1986 season saw the following rule change:

- Regarding the usage of the designated hitter (DH) in the World Series, the format in place since 1976 which saw the DH used only in even-numbered years, was changed. Now, the DH would be used depending on whether a game took place at a National or American League's home ballpark.

== Teams ==
League	Division	Team	City	Ballpark	Capacity	Manager
American League	East	Baltimore Orioles	Baltimore, Maryland	Baltimore Memorial Stadium	54,076	Earl Weaver
American League	East	Boston Red Sox	Boston, Massachusetts	Fenway Park	33,538	John McNamara
American League	East	Cleveland Indians	Cleveland, Ohio	Cleveland Stadium	74,483	Pat Corrales
American League	East	Detroit Tigers	Detroit, Michigan	Tiger Stadium	52,806	Sparky Anderson
American League	East	Milwaukee Brewers	Milwaukee, Wisconsin	Milwaukee County Stadium	53,192	George Bamberger
American League	East	Milwaukee Brewers	Milwaukee, Wisconsin	Milwaukee County Stadium	53,192	Tom Trebelhorn
American League	East	New York Yankees	New York, New York	Yankee Stadium	57,545	Lou Piniella
American League	East	Toronto Blue Jays	Toronto, Ontario	Exhibition Stadium	43,737	Jimy Williams
American League	West	California Angels	Anaheim, California	Anaheim Stadium	64,573	Gene Mauch
American League	West	Chicago White Sox	Chicago, Illinois	Comiskey Park	44,492	Tony La Russa
American League	West	Chicago White Sox	Chicago, Illinois	Comiskey Park	44,492	Doug Rader
American League	West	Chicago White Sox	Chicago, Illinois	Comiskey Park	44,492	Jim Fregosi
American League	West	Kansas City Royals	Kansas City, Missouri	Royals Stadium	40,613	Dick Howser
American League	West	Kansas City Royals	Kansas City, Missouri	Royals Stadium	40,613	Mike Ferraro
American League	West	Minnesota Twins	Minneapolis, Minnesota	Hubert H. Humphrey Metrodome	54,711	Ray Miller
American League	West	Minnesota Twins	Minneapolis, Minnesota	Hubert H. Humphrey Metrodome	54,711	Tom Kelly
American League	West	Oakland Athletics	Oakland, California	Oakland–Alameda County Coliseum	50,000	Jackie Moore
American League	West	Oakland Athletics	Oakland, California	Oakland–Alameda County Coliseum	50,000	Jeff Newman
American League	West	Oakland Athletics	Oakland, California	Oakland–Alameda County Coliseum	50,000	Tony La Russa
American League	West	Seattle Mariners	Seattle, Washington	Kingdome	59,438	Chuck Cottier
American League	West	Seattle Mariners	Seattle, Washington	Kingdome	59,438	Marty Martínez
American League	West	Seattle Mariners	Seattle, Washington	Kingdome	59,438	Dick Williams
American League	West	Texas Rangers	Arlington, Texas	Arlington Stadium	41,284	Bobby Valentine
National League	East	Chicago Cubs	Chicago, Illinois	Wrigley Field	37,702	Jim Frey
National League	East	Chicago Cubs	Chicago, Illinois	Wrigley Field	37,702	John Vukovich
National League	East	Chicago Cubs	Chicago, Illinois	Wrigley Field	37,702	Gene Michael
National League	East	Montreal Expos	Montreal, Quebec	Olympic Stadium	59,149	Buck Rodgers
National League	East	New York Mets	New York, New York	Shea Stadium	55,775	Davey Johnson
National League	East	Philadelphia Phillies	Philadelphia, Pennsylvania	Veterans Stadium	62,382	John Felske
National League	East	Pittsburgh Pirates	Pittsburgh, Pennsylvania	Three Rivers Stadium	58,336	Jim Leyland
National League	East	St. Louis Cardinals	St. Louis, Missouri	Busch Stadium	50,222	Whitey Herzog
National League	West	Atlanta Braves	Atlanta, Georgia	Atlanta–Fulton County Stadium	53,046	Bobby Wine
National League	West	Cincinnati Reds	Cincinnati, Ohio	Riverfront Stadium	52,953	Pete Rose
National League	West	Houston Astros	Houston, Texas	Houston Astrodome	47,000	Hal Lanier
National League	West	Los Angeles Dodgers	Los Angeles, California	Dodger Stadium	56,000	Tommy Lasorda
National League	West	San Diego Padres	San Diego, California	Jack Murphy Stadium	59,022	Steve Boros
National League	West	San Francisco Giants	San Francisco, California	Candlestick Park	58,495	Roger Craig

== Standings ==
=== American League ===
AL East
Team	W	L	Pct.	GB	Home	Road
Boston Red Sox	95	66	.590	—	51‍–‍30	44‍–‍36
New York Yankees	90	72	.556	5½	41‍–‍39	49‍–‍33
Detroit Tigers	87	75	.537	8½	49‍–‍32	38‍–‍43
Toronto Blue Jays	86	76	.531	9½	42‍–‍39	44‍–‍37
Cleveland Indians	84	78	.519	11½	45‍–‍35	39‍–‍43
Milwaukee Brewers	77	84	.478	18	41‍–‍39	36‍–‍45
Baltimore Orioles	73	89	.451	22½	37‍–‍42	36‍–‍47

AL West
Team	W	L	Pct.	GB	Home	Road
California Angels	92	70	.568	—	50‍–‍32	42‍–‍38
Texas Rangers	87	75	.537	5	51‍–‍30	36‍–‍45
Kansas City Royals	76	86	.469	16	45‍–‍36	31‍–‍50
Oakland Athletics	76	86	.469	16	47‍–‍36	29‍–‍50
Chicago White Sox	72	90	.444	20	41‍–‍40	31‍–‍50
Minnesota Twins	71	91	.438	21	43‍–‍38	28‍–‍53
Seattle Mariners	67	95	.414	25	41‍–‍41	26‍–‍54

=== National League ===
NL East
Team	W	L	Pct.	GB	Home	Road
New York Mets	108	54	.667	—	55‍–‍26	53‍–‍28
Philadelphia Phillies	86	75	.534	21½	49‍–‍31	37‍–‍44
St. Louis Cardinals	79	82	.491	28½	42‍–‍39	37‍–‍43
Montreal Expos	78	83	.484	29½	36‍–‍44	42‍–‍39
Chicago Cubs	70	90	.438	37	42‍–‍38	28‍–‍52
Pittsburgh Pirates	64	98	.395	44	31‍–‍50	33‍–‍48

NL West
Team	W	L	Pct.	GB	Home	Road
Houston Astros	96	66	.593	—	52‍–‍29	44‍–‍37
Cincinnati Reds	86	76	.531	10	43‍–‍38	43‍–‍38
San Francisco Giants	83	79	.512	13	46‍–‍35	37‍–‍44
San Diego Padres	74	88	.457	22	43‍–‍38	31‍–‍50
Los Angeles Dodgers	73	89	.451	23	46‍–‍35	27‍–‍54
Atlanta Braves	72	89	.447	23½	41‍–‍40	31‍–‍49

=== Tie game ===
1 tie game (1 in AL, 0 in NL), which are not factored into winning percentage or games behind (and were often replayed again) occurred throughout the season.

==== American League ====
- August 26, Toronto Blue Jays vs. Cleveland Indians, tied at 6 through 9 innings on account of a rain delay.

== Postseason ==
The postseason began on October 7 and ended on October 27 with the New York Mets defeating the Boston Red Sox in the 1986 World Series in seven games.

=== Bracket ===
League Championship Series (ALCS, NLCS)
East	Boston	4
West	California	3
East	NY Mets	4
West	Houston	2

World Series
AL	Boston	3
NL	NY Mets	4

== League leaders ==
=== American League ===
Hitting leaders
Stat	Player	Total
AVG	Wade Boggs (BOS)	.357
OPS	Don Mattingly (NYY)	.967
HR	Jesse Barfield (TOR)	40
RBI	Joe Carter (CLE)	121
R	Rickey Henderson (NYY)	130
H	Don Mattingly (NYY)	238
SB	Rickey Henderson (NYY)	87

Pitching leaders
Stat	Player	Total
W	Roger Clemens (BOS)	24
L	Richard Dotson (CWS); Mike Morgan (SEA)	17
ERA	Roger Clemens (BOS)	2.48
K	Mark Langston (SEA)	245
IP	Bert Blyleven (MIN)	271.2
SV	Dave Righetti (NYY)	46
WHIP	Roger Clemens (BOS)	0.969

=== National League ===
Hitting leaders
Stat	Player	Total
AVG	Tim Raines (MON)	.334
OPS	Mike Schmidt (PHI)	.937
HR	Mike Schmidt (PHI)	37
RBI	Mike Schmidt (PHI)	119
R	Tony Gwynn (SD); Von Hayes (PHI)	107
H	Tony Gwynn (SD)	211
SB	Vince Coleman (STL)	107

Pitching leaders
Stat	Player	Total
W	Fernando Valenzuela (LAD)	21
L	Rick Mahler (ATL)	18
ERA	Mike Scott (HOU)	2.22
K	Mike Scott (HOU)	306
IP	Mike Scott (HOU)	275.1
SV	Todd Worrell (STL)	36
WHIP	Mike Scott (HOU)	0.923

== Managerial changes ==
=== Off-season ===
Team	Former Manager	New Manager
Atlanta Braves	Bobby Wine	Chuck Tanner
Houston Astros	Bob Lillis	Hal Lanier
New York Yankees	Billy Martin	Lou Piniella
Pittsburgh Pirates	Chuck Tanner	Jim Leyland
San Diego Padres	Dick Williams	Steve Boros
Toronto Blue Jays	Bobby Cox	Jimy Williams

=== In-season ===
Team	Former Manager	New Manager
Chicago Cubs	Jim Frey	John Vukovich
Chicago Cubs	John Vukovich	Gene Michael
Chicago White Sox	Tony La Russa	Doug Rader
Chicago White Sox	Doug Rader	Jim Fregosi
Kansas City Royals	Dick Howser	Mike Ferraro
Milwaukee Brewers	George Bamberger	Tom Trebelhorn
Minnesota Twins	Ray Miller	Tom Kelly
Oakland Athletics	Jackie Moore	Jeff Newman
Oakland Athletics	Jeff Newman	Tony La Russa
Seattle Mariners	Chuck Cottier	Marty Martínez
Seattle Mariners	Marty Martínez	Dick Williams

== Milestones ==
=== Batters ===
==== Four home runs in one game ====
- Bob Horner (ATL):
  - Became the 11th player to hit four home runs in one game and third in franchise history, in an 11–8 loss against the Montreal Expos on July 6.

==== Cycles ====
- Tony Phillips (OAK):
  - Phillips hit for his first cycle and 11th in franchise history, on May 16 against the Baltimore Orioles.
- Kirby Puckett (MIN):
  - Puckett hit for his first cycle and 11th in franchise history, on August 1 against the Minnesota Twins.

==== Other batting accomplishments ====
- Dwight Evans (BOS):
  - Achieves a Major League first on Opening Day, April 7, in a game against the Detroit Tigers at Tiger Stadium, by hitting a home run off Jack Morris on the first pitch of the season.
- Roger Clemens (BOS):
  - At the age of 23, Clemens struck out twenty Seattle Mariners at Fenway Park to set a Major League record for a nine-inning game on April 29.
- Pete Rose (CIN):
  - Set a Major League record for most career hits at 4,256 hits on August 14 in the seventh inning with a single to left field against San Francisco Giants pitcher Greg Minton.

=== Pitchers ===
==== No-hitters ====
- Joe Cowley (CWS):
  - Cowley threw his first career no-hitter and 14th no-hitter in franchise history, by defeating the California Angels 7–1 on September 19. Cowley walked seven and struck out eight.
- Mike Scott (HOU):
  - Scott threw his first career no-hitter and eighth no-hitter in franchise history, by defeating the San Francisco Giants 2–0 on September 25. In a game that Houston clinched the National League West division title, Scott walked two, hit one by pitch, and struck out 13.

==== Other pitching accomplishments ====
- Roger Clemens (BOS):
  - Set a Major League record for most strikeouts in a single nine-inning game, throwing 20 strikeouts in a 3–1 win against the Seattle Mariners on April 29.
- Don Sutton (CAL):
  - Became the 19th member of the 300-win club, defeating the Texas Rangers on June 18, winning 5–1.
- Bert Blyleven (MIN):
  - Recorded his 3,000th career strikeout on August 1 by striking out Mike Davis of the Oakland Athletics in the fifth inning. Blyleven became the 10th player to reach this mark.
- Steve Carlton (CWS/SF/PHI):
  - Recorded his 4,000th career strikeout on August 5 as a member of the San Francisco Giants by striking out Eric Davis of the Cincinnati Reds in the third inning. Carlton became the second player to reach this mark.

=== Miscellaneous ===
- Steve Boros (SD):
  - On June 6 manager Steve Boros is ejected before the first pitch, after showing the umpire video footage of a disputed play from the night before.

== Awards and honors ==
Baseball Writers' Association of America Awards
BBWAA Award	National League	American League
Rookie of the Year	Todd Worrell (STL)	Jose Canseco (OAK)
Manager of the Year	Hal Lanier (HOU)	John McNamara (BOS)
Cy Young Award	Mike Scott (HOU)	Roger Clemens (BOS)
Most Valuable Player	Mike Schmidt (PHI)	Roger Clemens (BOS)
Gold Glove Awards
Position	National League	American League
Pitcher	Fernando Valenzuela (LAD)	Ron Guidry (NYY)
Catcher	Jody Davis (CHC)	Bob Boone (CAL)
First Baseman	Keith Hernandez (NYM)	Don Mattingly (NYY)
Second Baseman	Ryne Sandberg (CHC)	Frank White (KC)
Third Baseman	Mike Schmidt (PHI)	Gary Gaetti (MIN)
Shortstop	Ozzie Smith (STL)	Tony Fernández (TOR)
Outfielders	Tony Gwynn (SD)	Jesse Barfield (TOR)
Outfielders	Willie McGee (STL)	Gary Pettis (CAL)
Outfielders	Dale Murphy (ATL)	Kirby Puckett (MIN)
Silver Slugger Awards
Pitcher/Designated Hitter	Rick Rhoden (PIT)	Don Baylor (BOS)
Catcher	Gary Carter (NYM)	Lance Parrish (DET)
First Baseman	Glenn Davis (HOU)	Don Mattingly (NYY)
Second Baseman	Steve Sax (LAD)	Frank White (KC)
Third Baseman	Mike Schmidt (PHI)	Wade Boggs (BOS)
Shortstop	Hubie Brooks (MON)	Cal Ripken Jr. (BAL)
Outfielders	Tony Gwynn (SD)	Jesse Barfield (TOR)
Outfielders	Dave Parker (CIN)	George Bell (TOR)
Outfielders	Tim Raines (MON)	Kirby Puckett (MIN)

=== Other awards ===
- Outstanding Designated Hitter Award: Don Baylor (BOS)
- Roberto Clemente Award (Humanitarian): Garry Maddox (PHI)
- Hutch Award: Dennis Leonard (KC)
- League Championship Series Most Valuable Player Award: Mike Scott (HOU, National); Marty Barrett (BOS, American)
- Rolaids Relief Man Award: Todd Worrell (STL, National); Dave Righetti (NYY, American)

The Sporting News Awards
Award	National League	American League
Player of the Year	—	Roger Clemens (BOS)
Pitcher of the Year	Mike Scott (HOU)	Roger Clemens (BOS)
Fireman of the Year (Relief pitcher)	Todd Worrell (STL)	Dave Righetti (NYY)
Rookie Player of the Year	Robby Thompson (SF)	José Canseco (OAK)
Rookie Pitcher of the Year	Todd Worrell (STL)	Mark Eichhorn (TOR)
Comeback Player of the Year	Ray Knight (NYM)	John Candelaria (CAL)
Manager of the Year	Hal Lanier (HOU)	John McNamara (BOS)
Executive of the Year	Frank Cashen (NYM)	—

=== Monthly awards ===
==== Player of the Month ====
Month	National League	American League
April	Johnny Ray (PIT)	Kirby Puckett (MIN)
May	Hubie Brooks (MON)	Wade Boggs (BOS)
June	Kevin Bass (HOU)	Kent Hrbek (MIN)
July	Eric Davis (CIN)	Scott Fletcher (TEX)
August	Dale Murphy (ATL)	Doug DeCinces (CAL)
September	Steve Sax (LAD)	Don Mattingly (NYY)

==== Pitcher of the Month ====
Month	National League	American League
April	Dwight Gooden (NYM)	Roger Clemens (BOS)
May	Jeff Reardon (MON)	Don Aase (BAL)
June	Rick Rhoden (PIT)	Roger Clemens (BOS)
July	Todd Worrell (STL)	Jack Morris (DET)
August	Bill Gullickson (CIN)	Mike Witt (CAL)
September	Mike Krukow (SF)	Bruce Hurst (BOS)

=== Baseball Hall of Fame ===
- Bobby Doerr
- Ernie Lombardi
- Willie McCovey

== Home field attendance and payroll ==
Team name	Wins	%±	Home attendance	%±	Per game	Est. payroll	%±
Los Angeles Dodgers	73	−23.2%	3,023,208	−7.4%	37,324	$15,213,776	38.7%
New York Mets	108	10.2%	2,767,601	0.2%	34,168	$15,393,714	42.1%
California Angels	92	2.2%	2,655,872	3.4%	32,389	$14,427,258	0.0%
St. Louis Cardinals	79	−21.8%	2,471,974	−6.3%	30,518	$9,875,010	−16.4%
Toronto Blue Jays	86	−13.1%	2,455,477	−0.5%	30,315	$12,801,047	37.2%
Kansas City Royals	76	−16.5%	2,320,794	7.3%	28,652	$13,043,698	23.5%
New York Yankees	90	−7.2%	2,268,030	2.4%	28,350	$18,494,253	29.9%
Boston Red Sox	95	17.3%	2,147,641	20.2%	26,514	$14,402,239	32.2%
Baltimore Orioles	73	−12.0%	1,973,176	−7.5%	24,977	$13,001,258	7.6%
Philadelphia Phillies	86	14.7%	1,933,335	5.6%	24,167	$11,590,166	8.9%
Detroit Tigers	87	3.6%	1,899,437	−16.9%	23,450	$12,335,714	19.2%
Chicago Cubs	70	−9.1%	1,859,102	−14.0%	23,239	$17,208,165	35.5%
San Diego Padres	74	−10.8%	1,805,716	−18.3%	22,293	$11,380,693	1.7%
Houston Astros	96	15.7%	1,734,276	46.4%	21,411	$9,873,276	−1.2%
Cincinnati Reds	86	−3.4%	1,692,432	−7.8%	20,894	$11,906,388	42.4%
Texas Rangers	87	40.3%	1,692,002	52.1%	20,889	$6,743,119	−12.2%
San Francisco Giants	83	33.9%	1,528,748	86.7%	18,873	$8,947,000	8.8%
Cleveland Indians	84	40.0%	1,471,805	124.6%	18,170	$7,809,500	19.2%
Chicago White Sox	72	−15.3%	1,424,313	−14.7%	17,584	$10,418,819	5.8%
Atlanta Braves	72	9.1%	1,387,181	2.7%	17,126	$17,102,786	15.5%
Oakland Athletics	76	−1.3%	1,314,646	−1.5%	15,839	$9,779,421	8.0%
Milwaukee Brewers	77	8.5%	1,265,041	−7.0%	15,813	$9,943,642	−11.9%
Minnesota Twins	71	−7.8%	1,255,453	−24.0%	15,499	$9,498,167	64.8%
Montreal Expos	78	−7.1%	1,128,981	−24.9%	14,112	$11,103,600	17.2%
Seattle Mariners	67	−9.5%	1,029,045	−8.8%	12,549	$5,958,309	29.2%
Pittsburgh Pirates	64	12.3%	1,000,917	36.0%	12,357	$10,938,500	18.0%

== Media ==
=== Television ===
Network	Day of week	Announcers
ABC	Monday nights Sunday afternoons	Al Michaels, Jim Palmer, Tim McCarver, Keith Jackson, Don Drysdale
NBC	Saturday afternoons	Vin Scully, Joe Garagiola, Bob Costas, Tony Kubek

== Retired numbers ==
- Dick Howser had his No. 10 retired by the Kansas City Royals on July 3. This was the first number retired by the team.
- Rod Carew had his No. 29 retired by the Minnesota Twins on July 19. This was the second number retired by the team.
- On July 25, the Chicago White Sox retired two numbers, their fifth and sixth numbers retired by the team.
  - Ted Lyons had his No. 16 retired.
  - Billy Pierce had his No. 19 retired.
- Bill Mazeroski had his No. 9 retired by the Pittsburgh Pirates on August 7. This was the seventh number retired by the team.
- Billy Williams had his No. 26 retired by the Chicago Cubs on August 13. This was the second number retired by the team.
- Ralph Kiner had his No. 4 retired by the Pittsburgh Pirates on September 19. This was the eighth number retired by team.

== See also ==
- 1986 in baseball (Events, Movies, Births, Deaths)
- 1986 Nippon Professional Baseball season
