= Bob Ojeda =

American baseball player, coach, and analyst (born 1957)

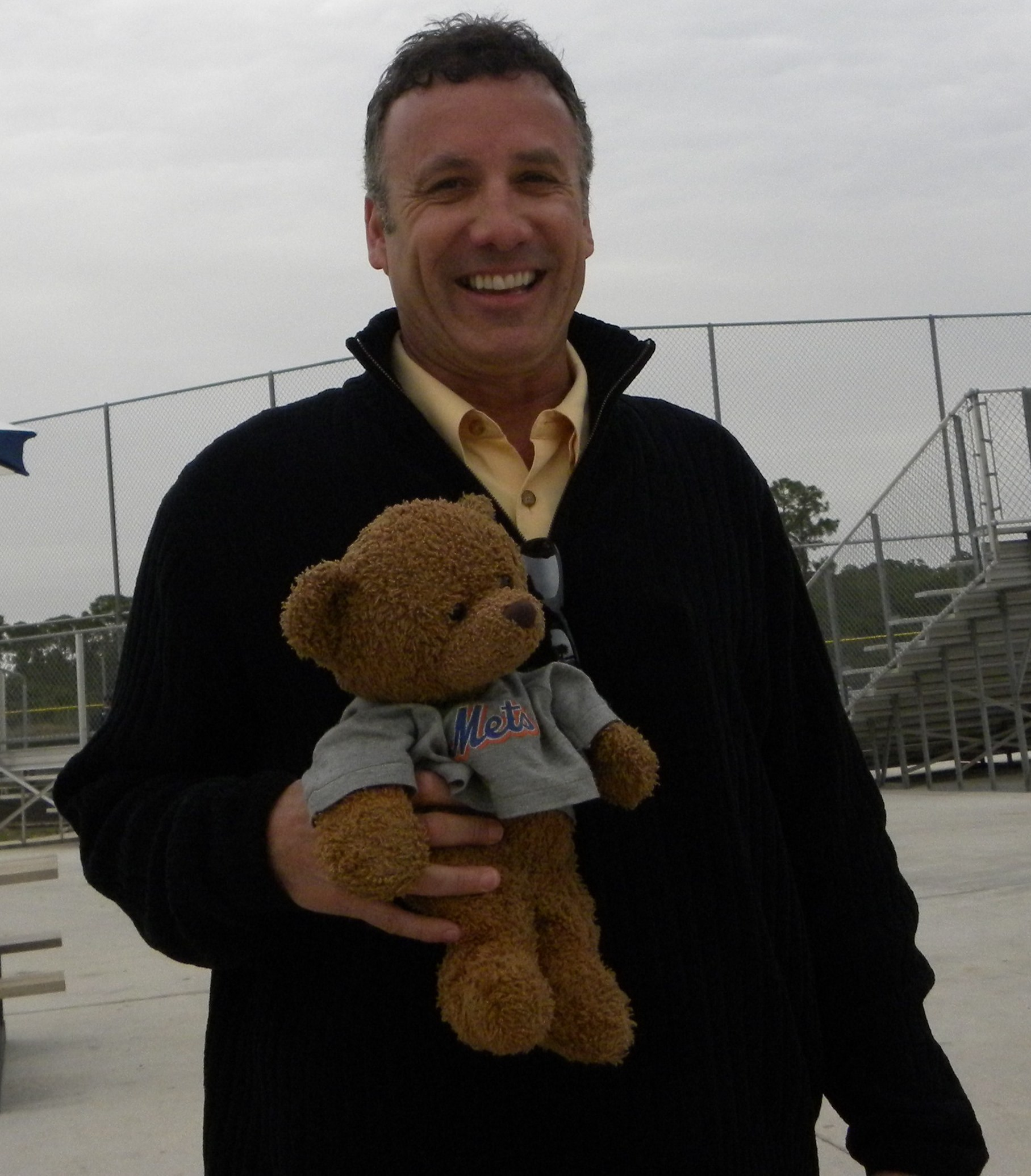
- Ojeda in 2010
- Pitcher
- Born: December 17, 1957 (age 68); Los Angeles, California, U.S.
- Batted: Left Threw: Left

MLB debut
- July 13, 1980, for the Boston Red Sox

Last MLB appearance
- April 22, 1994, for the New York Yankees

MLB statistics
- Win–loss record: 115–98
- Earned run average: 3.65
- Strikeouts: 1,128
- Stats at Baseball Reference

Teams
- Boston Red Sox (1980–1985); New York Mets (1986–1990); Los Angeles Dodgers (1991–1992); Cleveland Indians (1993); New York Yankees (1994)

Career highlights and awards
- World Series champion (1986)

Robert Michael Ojeda (/oʊˈhiːdə/ oh-HEE-də; born December 17, 1957) is an American former professional baseball player, coach and television sports color commentator. He played in Major League Baseball (MLB) as a left-handed pitcher from 1980 to 1994, most notably as a member of the New York Mets, with whom he won a world championship in 1986. He also played for the Boston Red Sox, Los Angeles Dodgers, Cleveland Indians and the New York Yankees. Ojeda was the lone survivor of a March 22, 1993, boating accident that killed fellow Cleveland Indians players Steve Olin and Tim Crews. He is a former pre- and post-game studio analyst for Mets' broadcasts.

== Career ==
Ojeda attended Redwood High School and College of the Sequoias in Visalia, California.

=== Boston Red Sox ===
Upon graduation, Ojeda was signed as an undrafted free agent by the Boston Red Sox in 1978.

Though his first professional season with the New York–Penn League's Elmira Pioneers went poorly (1–6 with a 4.81 ERA), in 1979, as a starting pitcher for the Winter Haven Red Sox of the Florida State League, Ojeda went 15–7 in 29 games started, earning a promotion to the triple A Pawtucket Red Sox for 1980. With a good earned run average, Ojeda was called up to the majors in July 1980. He made his major league debut on July 13 at Fenway Park against the Detroit Tigers, and was winning, 4–1, until the sixth inning when the Tigers scored three runs to tie the score, and knock Ojeda out of the game. The Red Sox eventually won, 8–4.

Ojeda's first victory was on August 2, against the Texas Rangers. Ojeda gave up no runs with four strikeouts over six innings. Two starts later, on August 11, he was removed from the game after having faced only three batters without getting an out, and was sent back to Pawtucket.

On June 23, 1981, Ojeda was the winning pitcher in the longest professional baseball game in history. The game between Pawtucket and the Rochester Red Wings started on April 18 but was suspended after 32 innings. Ojeda started the 33rd when play was resumed two months later and got credit for the win when Pawtucket won in the bottom of the inning after eighteen minutes. The first 32 innings had taken over eight hours.

Ojeda compiled a 12–9 record with a 2.13 ERA in 1981 for Pawtucket, and was voted the International League Most Valuable Pitcher of the year.

When the 1981 Major League Baseball strike ended, Ojeda's stellar ERA earned him a recall to the majors. He responded with a complete game seven-hit victory. This time, Ojeda's stay in the majors was for the long term, as he pitched well in all but his last two starts for Boston. The 1982 season went poorly for Ojeda in his first full season in the majors. After a couple of poor starts in May, he started splitting his time between starting and relief pitching and was shut down in mid-August with an ERA near six. When Ojeda returned home during the off-season, he was frustrated with his performance during the season and took up karate, saying that "if I ever get back to the big leagues and get beat around like I got beat around, somebody's going to pay."

In 1983, Ojeda turned things around for a Boston team that finished near the bottom of the division. As the fourth starter, he posted a 12–7 record and a 4.04 ERA, both of which were best in the rotation. In 1984, Ojeda and Bruce Hurst were the number-one starters and Ojeda posted another 12 wins (to go with 12 losses) which included a Major League lead-tying five shutouts. The Red Sox improved in the standings but Ojeda's numbers – including an ERA again near four – mostly stayed the same.

When 1985 started, the Red Sox were overstocked on starting pitchers, including a young Roger Clemens, so Ojeda was relegated to the bullpen. On May 4, 1985, he picked up the one and only save of his MLB career. Ojeda pitched 2/3 of an inning to close out a 5-4 Red Sox victory over the Athletics. Ironically, the starting and winning pitcher that day for the Red Sox was Steve Crawford, who was predominantly a relief pitcher throughout his career. Ojeda pitched so well out of the bullpen that he was moved back into the rotation at the end of May, but his ERA again ballooned over four, prompting the Red Sox to trade him after the season. The eight-player trade seemed minor at the time, but would have repercussions the following year, as it sent Ojeda to the New York Mets and Calvin Schiraldi to the Red Sox. Both would play important roles in the World Series the following year.

=== New York Mets ===
In 1986, Ojeda was fantastic for the Mets almost from day one. Despite starting in the bullpen and then being only the fourth starter, he finished with an 18–5 record, 2.57 ERA (second-best in the league) and 148 strikeouts – all career-bests. He got through the fifth inning in all but two of his starts and allowed zero earned runs in eight different starts. His lone blemish occurred off the field when, on July 19, he and teammates Ron Darling, Rick Aguilera, and Tim Teufel were arrested outside a bar in Houston, Texas for fighting with security guards (who were also off-duty police officers). All four were released in time for the following game. The incident fueled the 1986 Mets' reputation as a rowdy crew. Misdemeanor charges against Ojeda were eventually dropped.

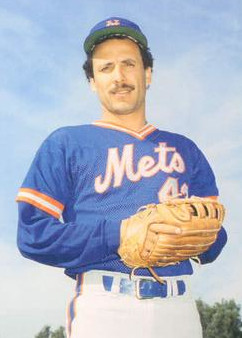
Ojeda in 1986

The team cruised through the 1986 regular season, building a double-digit lead before July that only widened in the second half of the season. After the Mets dropped the opening game of the 1986 National League Championship Series to the Houston Astros, Ojeda pitched a complete game to easily win Game 2. He also started Game 6, but gave up three runs in the first inning. The Mets recovered to tie the game in the ninth, and won in sixteen innings to earn a trip to the World Series. The Mets' opponents in the World Series were Ojeda's old team, the Boston Red Sox.

While the Mets won the NLCS in six games, the Red Sox had to overcome a three-games-to-one deficit to squeak by the California Angels in the 1986 American League Championship Series. Despite being heavy underdogs in the World Series, the Red Sox jumped to an early lead in the best-of-seven series by defeating the Mets in the first two games, both held at the Mets' home field, Shea Stadium. The Mets went to Boston staring at possible disaster, but Ojeda started and pitched well in Game 3, as the Mets cruised to a 7–1 victory. Ojeda earned the victory.

When Mets' ace Dwight Gooden again faltered in Game 5, they needed another big performance in Game 6. They turned to Ojeda, but this time, he was less than perfect, giving up two early runs. The Mets recovered later to tie the game, and Ojeda received a no-decision. When the Red Sox scored again to take the lead, they turned to the pitcher they had traded Ojeda for, Calvin Schiraldi, to close out the World Series. Schiraldi faced five batters, giving up hits to the last three, one of whom scored. With the chance to close out the first Boston championship since 1918 slipping away, Red Sox manager John McNamara turned to reliever Bob Stanley, who allowed two more of Schiraldi's runners to score, as the game turned into a legendary Met comeback, and nightmare for Bill Buckner and the Red Sox.

Ojeda had surgery in May 1987 and missed most of that season. He pitched well in 1988; in September the Mets clinched the NL East. This victory marked a point where Ojeda's luck would change, as he was involved in a bizarre incident wherein the tip of his left middle finger was severed by an electric hedge trimmer. After microsurgery to reattach his fingertip (and save his career), he missed the playoffs, hurting his team's chances. The Mets lost the NLCS, with Ojeda's replacement in the starting rotation, Sid Fernandez, struggling in his lone start. Ojeda did not quickly recover, declining in 1989 and spending most of 1990 pitching out of the bullpen.

=== Los Angeles Dodgers ===
After 1990, he was traded to the Los Angeles Dodgers for Hubie Brooks.

In his first season with the Dodgers, Ojeda pitched well as their only left-handed starter. He won an important game in the heat of a pennant race but the Dodgers lost three of their last four games and missed the playoffs. In 1992, his numbers sank some and he became a free agent after the season.

=== Cleveland Indians ===
After six weeks as a free agent, he was signed by the Cleveland Indians.

During spring training, which the Indians were spending in Winter Haven, Florida, for the first time after spending the previous forty-five years in Tucson, Arizona, Ojeda went on a boat ride with new teammates Steve Olin and Tim Crews at Crews' home in nearby Clermont. Crews, who was piloting the vessel, crashed it into a pier on Little Lake Nellie while intoxicated. Ojeda was the only survivor of the accident, but suffered major head lacerations and sat out most of the season to recuperate both physically and mentally. He attributed the fact that he was slouching in his seat at the time of the accident for saving his life. He returned late that season and had a 4.40 ERA in 43 innings.

=== New York Yankees ===
Ojeda became a free agent after the 1993 season. He was signed by the New York Yankees for 1994 but pitched poorly in two games and was soon released. He retired as a player soon after.

=== Post-retirement ===
Ojeda maintained a private life after retiring until 2001, when he was hired as the pitching coach for the Mets A-level Brooklyn Cyclones. After two seasons with the Cyclones, he was promoted to pitching coach for the AA Binghamton Mets in 2003. Later that year, the Mets fired their pitching coach Vern Ruhle and Ojeda was mentioned as a possible candidate. However, the Mets ultimately hired Rick Peterson. A few months later, Ojeda resigned as pitching coach and publicly criticized the Mets' management; however, he maintained that the failed candidacy for the Mets' pitching coach position did not play a direct role in his decision to resign.

In 2005, Ojeda was hired as the pitching coach for the Can-Am League's Worcester Tornadoes. The manager, Rich Gedman, was Ojeda's former batterymate with the Red Sox. In Ojeda's first year, the team won the championship. After the 2007 season, Ojeda was promoted to the front office.

In 2008, Ojeda joined the Rumson-Fair Haven Regional High School baseball coaching staff as a pitching instructor.

In 2009, Ojeda joined SportsNet New York as a studio analyst for Mets broadcasts with Chris Carlin. Ojeda left the network after the 2014 season.
