= Kevin Elster =

American baseball player (born 1964)

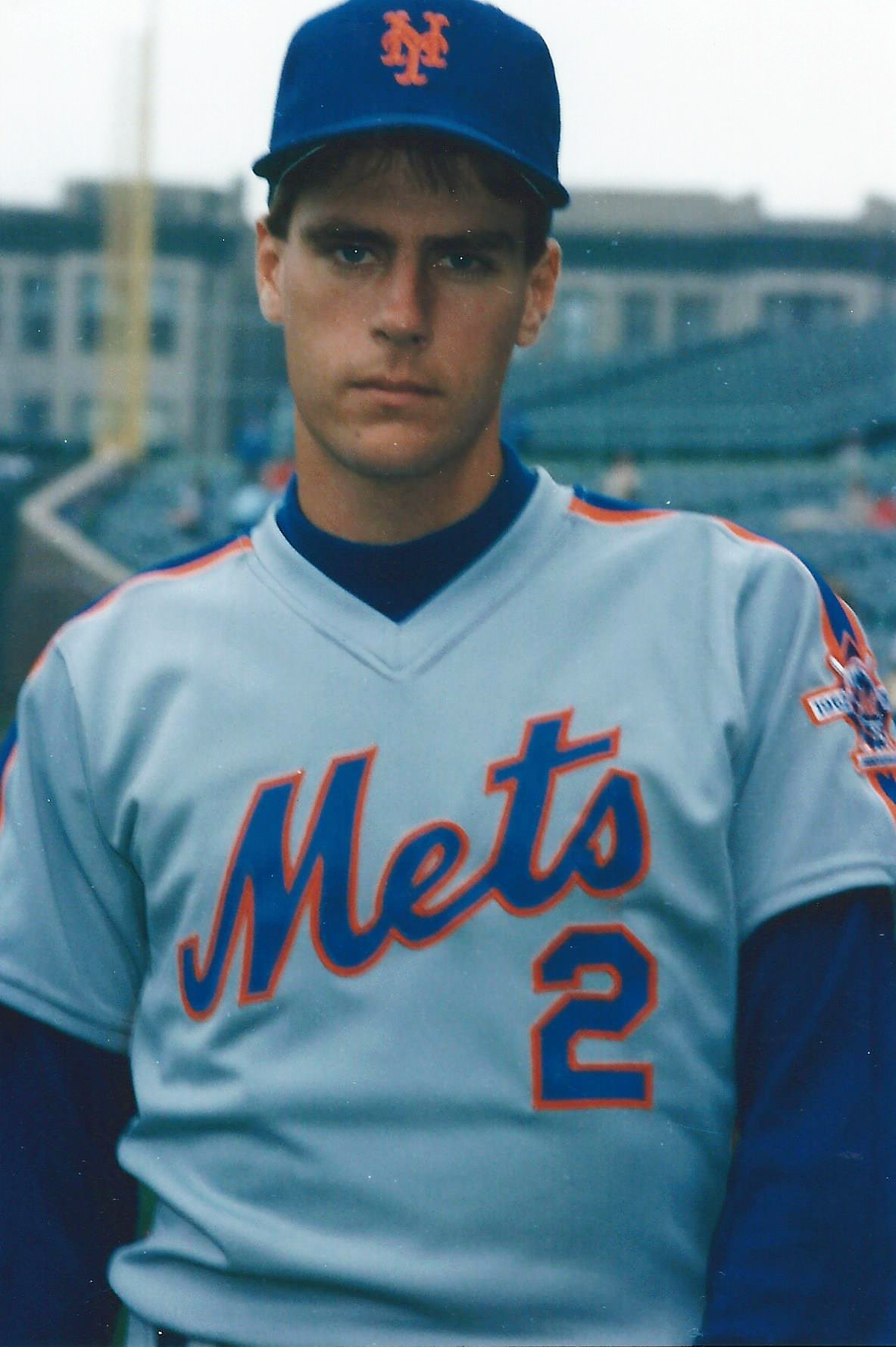
- Shortstop
- Born: August 3, 1964 (age 62); San Pedro, California, U.S.
- Batted: Right Threw: Right

MLB debut
- September 2, 1986, for the New York Mets

Last MLB appearance
- October 1, 2000, for the Los Angeles Dodgers

MLB statistics
- Batting average: .228
- Home runs: 88
- Runs batted in: 376
- Stats at Baseball Reference

Teams
- New York Mets (1986–1992); New York Yankees (1994–1995); Philadelphia Phillies (1995); Texas Rangers (1996); Pittsburgh Pirates (1997); Texas Rangers (1998); Los Angeles Dodgers (2000)

Career highlights and awards
- World Series champion (1986)

Kevin Daniel Elster (born August 3, 1964) is an American former professional baseball shortstop. Known primarily for his fielding, Elster broke a 42-year-old Major League Baseball record by playing 88 consecutive games at shortstop without committing an error.

== Early years ==
Elster was drafted by the New York Mets in the second round of the January 1984 draft out of Golden West College in Huntington Beach, California. He batted .269 with fourteen home runs and 135 runs batted in over three seasons in the Mets' farm system when he received a somewhat surprising September call up to the majors in 1986 with the Mets on the verge of capturing the National League East. He made his major league debut as a late inning defensive replacement on September 2 against the San Francisco Giants, and got his first major league hit in his first major league at bat the following day. Over the remainder of the season, Elster batted .167 with three runs scored. He had one extra base hit, a double off the Philadelphia Phillies' Kevin Gross. He appeared in four games of the 1986 National League Championship Series against the Houston Astros, and game six of the 1986 World Series against the Boston Red Sox. In four postseason at bats, he had no hits.

Elster's bat caught up to his glove in 1987 with the triple A Tidewater Tides. He batted .310 with eight home runs and 74 runs batted in, and set a franchise record with 170 hits. Once again, he received a call up to the majors that September. He collected four hits in ten at bats, and got his first major league run batted in with a double off the St. Louis Cardinals' John Tudor on October 2. Following the season, the Mets traded incumbent shortstop Rafael Santana to the New York Yankees in order to open the position up for Elster.

== Professional career ==
=== New York Mets ===
In his first game as the Mets' regular shortstop in the 1988 season opener, Elster hit his first major league home run off the Montreal Expos' Dennis Martinez. His batting average hovered in the low .100s through most of April until a 4-for-5 with two runs and two runs batted in on April 26 against the Atlanta Braves raised his average above .200. He managed to keep it there the rest of the way. On July 19, Elster committed a first-inning error that led to five unearned runs in the Mets' 11–2 loss to the Cincinnati Reds. It was his last error of the season.

He did not commit another regular season error until May 9, 1989, giving him a major league record 88 consecutive regular season games at shortstop without an error, breaking a Major League record set by Eddie Brinkman of the Detroit Tigers in 1972. (Hall of Famer Cal Ripken Jr. broke Elster's record in 1990, playing in 95 errorless games. Elster still holds the National League record, which he broke on April 19.) Elster committed two errors in game four of the 1988 National League Championship Series against the Los Angeles Dodgers.

While his fielding was still solid (he led all National League shortstops with 235 putouts), Elster got off to a slow start with the bat in 1989 (.210 batting average, 10 runs batted in). His first home run of the season on June 4 signaled a reversal of fortune for Elster. From there, he batted .241 with ten home runs and 45 runs batted in.

1989 was his last full season with the Mets. A shoulder injury ended his 1990 season on August 3. He came back strong in 1991, batting .314 through the first month of the season, until a groin injury placed him on the injured list on May 6. He made it just six games into the 1992 season before shoulder surgery ended his season. He was non-tendered by the Mets for 1993.

=== New York Yankees ===
Elster signed a minor league contract with the Dodgers prior to spring training in 1993. He batted .282 in ten games for the double A San Antonio Missions before being released. Shortly afterwards, he signed as a free agent with the Florida Marlins, and was again immediately released. He signed with the San Diego Padres that Winter, but failed to make the club in Spring Training. Shortly into the 1994 season, he signed as a Free agent with the New York Yankees. On June 30, he played in his first major league game in over two years. His tenure with the Yankees lasted just seventeen games. In which, he went 2-for-37 before his release on June 8, 1995. After which, he was signed and immediately released by the Kansas City Royals.

=== Philadelphia Phillies ===
Shortly afterwards, he joined the Phillies. He went 5-for-17 in his short stay with the triple A Scranton/Wilkes-Barre Red Barons before being brought up to Philadelphia. On August 18, Elster had four runs batted in against the Giants, and hit his first major league home run in almost five years off Chris Hook. On September 16, facing his former franchise for the first time in his career, Elster went 1-for-3 with a double, walk and two runs scored. Phillies manager Jim Fregosi also used Elster at third and first, the first time he had ever played a position other than shortstop in his major league career.

=== Texas Rangers ===
In January 1996, Elster signed with the Texas Rangers. Originally signed to serve as a backup to Benji Gil, Elster became the starter after an injury to Gil. He went on to have a career year, hitting a career high 24 home runs in a career high 596 plate appearances. 92 of his career high 99 runs batted in came batting ninth, a major league record. He also had career highs in games (157), runs (79) and extra base hits (58) to earn the Sporting News Comeback Player of the Year award. In 1996, Elster played 146 games and had 21 home runs over 557 plate appearances batting ninth in the order, breaking Dale Sveum's 1987 mark of 15 home runs from the ninth spot to set a single-season record. The closest players have come to that mark since are Charles Johnson and Michael A. Taylor, who hit 17 home runs from the ninth spot in 2000 and 2023, respectively.

Elster returned to the postseason for the first time since 1988, and was 4-for-12 with two runs scored in the 1996 American League Division Series against the Yankees.

=== Pittsburgh Pirates ===
During the off-season, he signed a $1.65 million one-year contract with the Pittsburgh Pirates. Batting fifth for the Bucs, Elster got off to a strong start. He went 2-for-4 with a double, two runs batted in and a run scored to lead his team to a 5–2 victory over the Giants in the 1997 season opener. On May 16, an injury once again ended Elster's season when he broke his wrist in a collision with Marlins second baseman Kurt Abbott on a sacrifice bunt. After the season, he re-signed with the Rangers. He was batting .232 with eight home runs and 37 runs batted in when the Rangers acquired All-Star shortstop Royce Clayton from the Cardinals at the July 31 trade deadline, and released Elster. Elster chose to retire rather than try to sign with another team.

=== Los Angeles Dodgers ===
After sitting out the entire 1999 season, Elster was lured out of retirement by the then Dodgers manager Davey Johnson. He won the starting job at short, and on April 11, 2000, in the first game played at Pacific Bell Park in San Francisco, Elster hit three home runs. Elster eventually lost the starting job to prospect Álex Cora. He batted .227 with fourteen home runs and 38 runs batted in during 2000. After the season, he retired for good.

== Career statistics ==
Games	PA	AB	Runs	Hits	2B	3B	HR	RBI	SB	BB	SO	HBP	Avg.	Slg.	Fld%
940	3225	2844	332	648	136	12	88	376	14	295	562	13	.228	.377	.974

He played 13 seasons in from 1986 to 2000 for the Mets, Yankees, Phillies, Rangers, Pirates and Dodgers.

On August 27, 2022, the New York Mets held their first Old Timers Day since 1994. Elster was the starting shortstop for the Amazins where he went 1-1 and recorded a putout.

== In pop culture ==
Elster played the part of Pat Corning in the 1994 movie Little Big League.

In 2021, indie-folk artist Cousin Wolf released a song entitled "Kevin Elster" as part of an album called "Nine Innings."

== Personal life ==
In 108 Stitches, former Mets pitcher Ron Darling's tell-all memoir of his playing days, Darling claims "Elster liked to think of himself as a ladies’ man, and he was. He was always talking about his exploits."

Elster has been married and divorced three times. His engagement to his first wife, Jennifer Pizzata, was chronicled by The New York Times. She later described how groupies broke up their marriage.
