= Ed Romero =

Puerto Rican baseball player (born 1957)

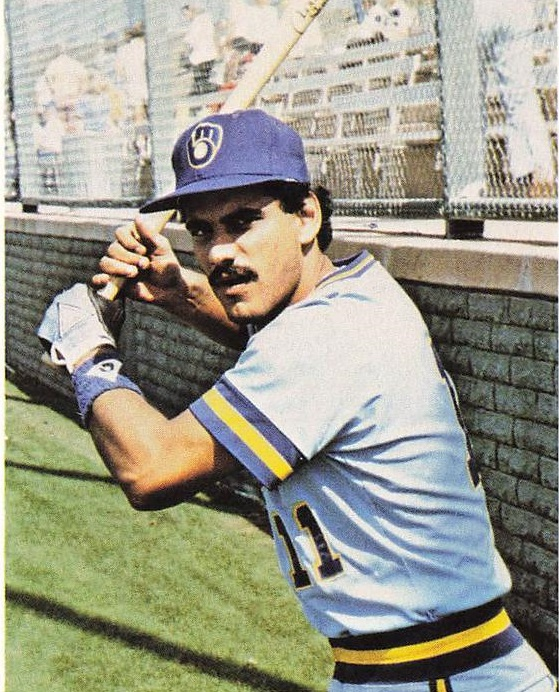
- Romero with the Milwaukee Brewers ca. 1983
- Infielder
- Born: December 9, 1957 (age 68); Santurce, Puerto Rico
- Batted: Right Threw: Right

MLB debut
- July 16, 1977, for the Milwaukee Brewers

Last MLB appearance
- June 27, 1990, for the Detroit Tigers

MLB statistics
- Batting average: .247
- Home runs: 8
- Runs batted in: 155
- Stats at Baseball Reference

Teams
- Milwaukee Brewers (1977, 1980–1985); Boston Red Sox (1986–1989); Atlanta Braves (1989); Milwaukee Brewers (1989); Detroit Tigers (1990)

Edgardo Ralph Romero Rivera (born December 9, 1957) is a Puerto Rican former professional baseball infielder and coach in Major League Baseball (MLB). He played for the Milwaukee Brewers, Boston Red Sox, Atlanta Braves, and Detroit Tigers. Listed at 5 feet 11 inches (1.80 m) and 160 pounds (73 kg), he batted and threw right-handed. He was later a coach for the Houston Astros, and a manager for several Minor League Baseball teams. His son, Eddie, is an executive with the Red Sox.

== Playing career ==
=== Milwaukee Brewers ===
Romero began his professional baseball career in the Milwaukee Brewers' minor league organization, playing for the Class A Burlington Bees in 1976. In 1977, he played for the Double-A Holyoke Millers and also made his MLB debut with the Brewers, appearing in 10 games with a .280 batting average. In 1978 and 1979, Romero played at the Triple-A level. He played with the Brewers during the 1980 to 1985 seasons, batting a career-high .317 in 1983, and appearing in a career-high 116 games in 1984. He played in one postseason game with the Brewers, during the 1981 American League Division Series against the New York Yankees, going 1-for-2 at the plate. Overall, in parts of eight seasons with Milwaukee, Romero batted .254 with five home runs and 102 RBIs in 426 games.

=== Boston Red Sox ===
Romero was traded by the Brewers to the Boston Red Sox in December 1985 in exchange for pitcher Mark Clear. Romero spent part of four seasons with the Red Sox (1986–1989), appearing in 219 games while batting .241 with two home runs and 42 RBIs. Boston release him in August 1989. While with Boston, he appeared in one game of the 1986 American League Championship Series, three games of the 1986 World Series, and one game of the 1988 American League Championship Series, going hitless in five at bats during those games.

=== Atlanta Braves ===
Romero signed with the Atlanta Braves and appeared in seven games with them in August 1989, batting .263 (5-for-19). In late August, Atlanta traded him to Milwaukee for a player to be named later (pitcher Jay Aldrich).

=== Return to Milwaukee Brewers ===
Romero appeared in 15 games with the Brewers in August and September 1989, batting .200 (10-for-50). After the season ended, he became a free agent.

=== Detroit Tigers ===
Romero signed with the Detroit Tigers in January 1990, and appeared in 32 games with the team, batting .229 (16-for-70). Detroit released him on July 15, 1990.

=== Late career ===
In 1991, Romero appeared in 28 games for the Triple-A Las Vegas Stars, a farm team of the San Diego Padres. He batted .229 (16-for-70) with the Stars.

=== Career totals ===
In 12 major league seasons, Romero played in 730 games while batting .247 (473-for-1912) with eight home runs and 155 RBIs. He appeared as a designated hitter and all defensive positions except for pitcher and catcher.

== Post-playing career ==
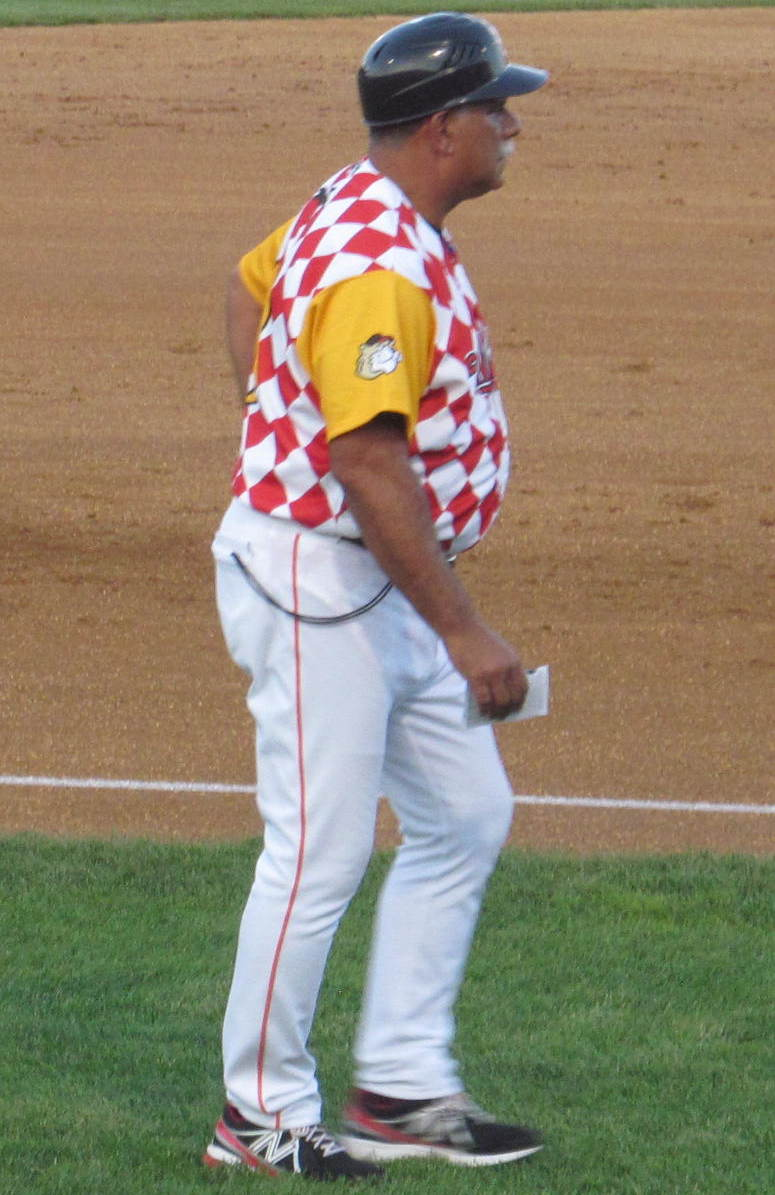
Romero with the Tri-City ValleyCats in 2014

Romero served as manager for several minor league teams, working within the Padres organization (1992–1996) and Milwaukee organization (1998, 2001–2002).

In 2007, Romero was named the Florida Marlins' minor league infield coordinator. He was the Houston Astros' third-base coach in 2008, and was their bench coach in 2009.

In 2010, Romero returned to managing in the minor leagues, working within the Astros organization. His most recent stint as a manager was with the Tri-City ValleyCats of the New York–Penn League for the 2013 to 2015 seasons.

== Personal life ==
Romero's son, Eddie, is an executive with the Boston Red Sox; as of the 2025 season, his title is executive vice president and assistant general manager.

== See also ==
- List of Major League Baseball players from Puerto Rico
