= Marty Barrett (second baseman) =

American baseball player (born 1958)

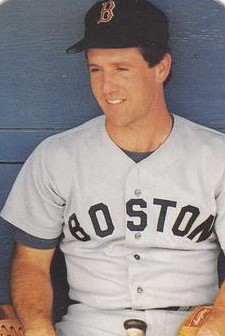
- Second baseman
- Born: June 23, 1958 (age 68); Arcadia, California, U.S.
- Batted: Right Threw: Right

MLB debut
- September 6, 1982, for the Boston Red Sox

Last MLB appearance
- May 7, 1991, for the San Diego Padres

MLB statistics
- Batting average: .278
- Home runs: 18
- Runs batted in: 314
- Stats at Baseball Reference

Teams
- Boston Red Sox (1982–1990); San Diego Padres (1991)

Career highlights and awards
- ALCS MVP (1986); Boston Red Sox Hall of Fame

Martin Glenn Barrett (born June 23, 1958) is an American former Major League Baseball second baseman who played for the Boston Red Sox (1982–1990) and San Diego Padres (1991).

== Early life and minor league career ==
Barrett was born in Arcadia, California. He attended Mesa Community College and is an alumnus of Arizona State University. He is the brother of Tommy Barrett, another former MLB player who played for the Philadelphia Phillies.

Marty played in the longest professional baseball game in history in 1981, a minor league game between the Pawtucket Red Sox and the Rochester Red Wings. Barrett had the distinction of scoring the winning run for Pawtucket in the bottom of the 33rd inning.

== Major League career ==
An excellent second baseman with an above-average arm, Barrett was known as a smart player and a great contact hitter, striking out only 209 times in 3378 at-bats, and collecting a significant number of big hits by driving tough pitches to the opposite field. He often was used as a specialist in bunting situations, leading the American League in sacrifice hits for three consecutive years (1986–88).

In a ten-year career Barrett was a .278 hitter with 18 home runs and 314 RBI in 941 games. Barrett successfully pulled off the hidden ball trick three times, including twice in July 1985.

In 1984, Barrett batted a career-high .303 in his first full season. But his most productive year was 1986, when he posted career-highs in RBI (60), hits (179), doubles (39), triples (4), stolen bases (15) and games played (158).

He starred in the 1986 postseason, when he set a major league record with 24 hits in 14 postseason games, and was named the ALCS Most Valuable Player. In the 1986 World Series Barrett had 13 hits in 30 at bats (.433 BA), and posted an on-base percentage of .514 against the New York Mets. Near the conclusion of Game Six, he had been selected by the NBC Television broadcast team as the Player of the Game. He was the final batter in the series, striking out against Mets closer, Jesse Orosco.

Barrett held the starting second baseman position with the Red Sox for most of the 1980s. On June 4, 1989, he suffered a serious knee injury while tripping over first base following a ground out. Jody Reed took over as the starter, and Barrett played only sporadically following his recovery. During the final game of the 1990 ALCS, Red Sox pitcher, Roger Clemens, was ejected in the bottom of the second inning. Barrett protested the call by heaving plastic water containers onto the field, and also was thrown out of the game. It was his last game for the Red Sox and he was released following the season.

Barrett signed with the San Diego Padres in 1991. In his National League debut he was called upon as a pinch hitter to face the San Francisco Giants' Dave Righetti, with two outs in the ninth inning. Barrett, not known for his power stroke, hit the ball into the left field stands for a three-run home run. He would only appear in 11 more games with the Padres, the same knee injury that he had suffered in 1989 ending his career.
