= Calvin Schiraldi =

American baseball player (born 1962)

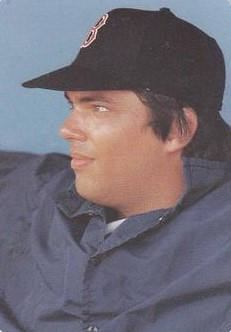
- Pitcher
- Born: June 16, 1962 (age 64); Houston, Texas, U.S.
- Batted: Right Threw: Right

MLB debut
- September 1, 1984, for the New York Mets

Last MLB appearance
- July 3, 1991, for the Texas Rangers

MLB statistics
- Win–loss record: 32–39
- Earned run average: 4.28
- Strikeouts: 471
- Stats at Baseball Reference

Teams
- New York Mets (1984–1985); Boston Red Sox (1986–1987); Chicago Cubs (1988–1989); San Diego Padres (1989–1990); Texas Rangers (1991)

Calvin Drew Schiraldi (born June 16, 1962) is an American former professional baseball pitcher. He played in Major League Baseball (MLB) from 1984 through 1991 for five different teams. He is best remembered as the losing pitcher of Games 6 and 7 of the 1986 World Series, when he pitched for the Boston Red Sox. Listed at 6 feet 5 inches (1.96 m) and 215 pounds (98 kg), he threw and batted right-handed.

== Early years and amateur career ==
Schiraldi was born in Houston, Texas, and attended Westlake High School in Austin, Texas. He was drafted after high school by the Chicago White Sox in the 17th round of the 1980 Major League Baseball draft, but chose instead to attend the University of Texas. Schiraldi, along with future Boston Red Sox teammate Roger Clemens, pitched the 1983 Texas Longhorns baseball team to a 1983 College World Series championship. Schiraldi was named the College World Series Most Outstanding Player and to the All-Tournament Team.

== Professional career ==
=== New York Mets (1984–1985) ===
Following his performance in the College World Series, Schiraldi was selected by the New York Mets in the first round (27th pick) of the 1983 Major League Baseball draft. After going 17–4 with a 2.59 earned run average for the Jackson Mets and Tidewater Tides in 1984, Schiraldi received a September call-up to the Mets. He made his major league debut on September 1, starting the second game of a double header against the San Diego Padres, and gave up five runs (four earned) in 3.1 innings. Schiraldi did not figure in the decision in that game. He made two more starts for the Mets that year, losing both.

Schiraldi split 1985 between the Mets and Tidewater, earning his first major league win on April 22 against the St. Louis Cardinals. Following the season, Schiraldi was traded to the Red Sox along with John Christensen, Wes Gardner and La Schelle Tarver for Bob Ojeda, Tom McCarthy, John Mitchell and Chris Bayer.

=== Boston Red Sox (1986–1987) ===
With the International League's Pawtucket Red Sox, Schiraldi was converted to a reliever. He made his debut with the big league club on July 20, 1986. With no outs, runners on first and third, and the Red Sox already down 6-3 to the Seattle Mariners in the Kingdome, Schiraldi replaced Jeff Sellers in the sixth inning. He allowed both inherited base runners to score, and gave up an earned run of his own in the sixth. However, he pitched a perfect seventh.

He pitched again the next day, striking out four in 2 2/3 innings without giving up a run. He earned manager John McNamara's trust with similarly impressive performances on July 26 and August 1, and on August 3, with the Red Sox leading the Kansas City Royals, 5–3, Schiraldi entered in the ninth inning with runners on first and second and no outs. He struck out the first two batters he faced and retired the third for his first career save.

Whereas closing duties had been split between Bob Stanley and Joe Sambito up to that point, Schiraldi emerged as the Bosox's closer for the remainder of the season. He ended the season with a 4–2 record, nine saves, a 1.41 ERA and 55 strikeouts in 51 innings.

Schiraldi appeared in four of the seven games of the 1986 American League Championship Series against the California Angels. Although he took the loss in game four, he pitched respectably in the series, striking out five in the final two innings of game seven.

==== 1986 World Series ====
After saving game one of the World Series, Schiraldi entered game six in the bottom of the eighth after Roger Clemens was lifted for a pinch hitter. The Red Sox were ahead, 3–2, but he gave up a game-tying sacrifice fly to Mets catcher Gary Carter. Schiraldi allowed the first two batters to reach base in the ninth but retired the next three. The Sox gave him a two-run lead when he took the mound in the tenth, three outs away from what would have been their first World Series title since 1918.

Schiraldi retired the first two batters but allowed three straight singles to Carter, Kevin Mitchell and Ray Knight. Knight's hit knocked in Carter to cut the Red Sox lead to 1 run. Schiraldi was replaced by Bob Stanley, who threw a wild pitch, which allowed Mitchell to score the tying run. Mookie Wilson followed by hitting a ground ball that rolled between the legs of Bill Buckner, scoring Knight and giving the Mets an improbable victory.

That led to a deciding game seven. With the score tied, 3–3, in the seventh inning, Schiraldi gave up a leadoff home run to Knight, who became the series MVP. Schiraldi gave up two more earned runs in just 1/3 of an inning to take the loss in the series clincher. His ERA for the World Series was 13.50.

=== Chicago Cubs (1988–1989) ===
In 1987, Wes Gardner, who also came over from the Mets in the Ojeda trade, emerged as the primary closer for the Red Sox, though Schiraldi did have six saves. Following the season, he and Al Nipper were traded to the Chicago Cubs for Lee Smith. With the Cubs, Schiraldi was converted back into a starter, and went 9-13 with a 4.38 ERA in 1988. The Cubs shifted him back to the bullpen in 1989 before sending him to the San Diego Padres just before the August 30 trade deadline, with Darrin Jackson and a player to be named later for Luis Salazar and Marvell Wynne.

=== San Diego Padres (1989–1990) ===
Schiraldi made four starts with the Padres in 1989, going 3–1 with a 2.53 ERA. Though he did make eight starts with the Padres in 1990 (including the game where Roseanne Barr infamously performed "The Star-Spangled Banner" at Jack Murphy Stadium), he found himself in the bullpen for most of the season. Schiraldi went 3–8 with one save and a 4.41 ERA in 1990. Schiraldi recorded his final MLB save on April 23, 1990; he pitched the final 3 innings of a 13-3 padres victory over the Giants. The Padres released him during Spring training the following season. He hit two home runs during his stint with the Padres.

=== Texas Rangers (1991) ===
Schiraldi caught on with the Houston Astros following his release from the Padres. He was assigned to their triple A Pacific Coast League affiliate, the Tucson Toros, with whom he went 3–2 with a 4.47 ERA before being dealt to the Texas Rangers. He made three appearances with the Rangers in 1991, spending most of the season with their American Association affiliate, the Oklahoma City 89ers.

== MLB statistics ==
Seasons	W	L	PCT	ERA	G	GS	CG	SHO	SV	IP	H	ER	R	HR	BB	K	WP	HBP
8	32	39	.451	4.28	235	47	2	1	21	553.1	522	263	285	62	267	471	21	9

== Personal life ==
Schiraldi was previously the head coach of the baseball team at St. Michael's Catholic Academy in Austin, Texas, and the 17U Texas Fire travel team. He is currently the head coach for the Action Baseball Club 17U White team.

Schiraldi is married to Debbie Murphy Schiraldi, whom he met in 1984 in Jackson, Mississippi, while pitching for the Jackson Mets, a Texas League Class AA affiliate of the New York Mets. That year Schiraldi went 14-3 for the championship squad. Calvin and Debbie Schiraldi have two children, Samantha and Lukas.

Schiraldi's son Lukas played four years of baseball at St. Michael's Catholic Academy under his father as head coach, and was named to the All-State team as a pitcher his senior season. Like his father, Lukas pitched for the University of Texas Longhorns, going 9-4 during the 2014 season. Lukas was signed in June 2014 by the Seattle Mariners and played in their minor league system until July 2017, when he was part of a trade to the Miami Marlins for David Phelps. He was released by the Marlins' Jupiter Hammerheads in April 2019.

Schiraldi wrote the book The Arena: The True Story of One Man's Search for Excellence and the Price He Paid for Daring to Achieve It about his upbringing, time spent at the University of Texas, his Major League career and post playing days.
