= 1986 World Series =

83rd edition of Major League Baseball's championship series

Team (Wins)	Managers	Season
New York Mets (4)	Davey Johnson	108–54, .667, GA: 21 1/2
Boston Red Sox (3)	John McNamara	95–66, .590, GA: 5 1/2
- Dates: October 18–27
- Venue(s): Shea Stadium (New York); Fenway Park (Boston)
- MVP: Ray Knight (New York)
- Umpires: John Kibler (NL), Jim Evans (AL), Harry Wendelstedt (NL), Joe Brinkman (AL), Ed Montague (NL), Dale Ford (AL)
- Hall of Famers: Mets: Gary Carter; Red Sox: Wade Boggs; Jim Rice; Tom Seaver (DNP)

Broadcast
- Television: NBC
- TV announcers: Vin Scully and Joe Garagiola
- Radio: CBS; WHN (NYM); WPLM (BOS)
- Radio announcers: Jack Buck and Sparky Anderson (CBS); Bob Murphy and Gary Thorne (WHN); Ken Coleman and Joe Castiglione (WPLM)
- ALCS: Boston Red Sox over California Angels (4–3)
- NLCS: New York Mets over Houston Astros (4–2)

The 1986 World Series was the championship series of Major League Baseball's (MLB) 1986 season. The 83rd edition of the World Series, it was a best-of-seven playoff played between the National League (NL) champion New York Mets and the American League (AL) champion Boston Red Sox. The Mets won the series in seven games, claiming their second World Series title and first since 1969.

The series is best remembered for its Game 6, which saw the Mets rally from a two-run deficit in the bottom of the 10th inning, despite having two outs and no one on base. The Red Sox, who held a 3–2 series lead, were twice one strike away from securing the championship, but failed to close out the inning as the Mets won off an error by Boston first baseman Bill Buckner. When the Mets won the series in Game 7, the Game 6 collapse entered baseball lore as part of the Curse of the Bambino superstition used to explain the Red Sox's championship drought between 1918 and 2004.

The 1986 World Series marked the second time, after the previous year's series, in which the winning team lost the first two games of the series at home (the Kansas City Royals accomplished this the year prior). It happened again in the 1996 World Series with the New York Yankees, the last such World Series occurrence, but it would happen in the 2025 American League Championship Series with the Toronto Blue Jays.

It was also the first World Series to use the designated hitter only in games played at the American League representative's stadium, a policy that was maintained until the National League's adoption of the DH in 2022 (save for 2020, when the DH was used for all World Series games after it was used in the NL during the COVID-19 reduced regular season). (Note: With the exception of the 2020 World Series, which was played at a neutral site due to the COVID-19 pandemic.)

== Background ==
This was the fifth meeting between teams from Boston and New York City for a major professional sports championship. This previously occurred in two Stanley Cup Finals (1929, 1972) and two previous World Series (1912, 1916).

=== New York Mets ===
The New York Mets finished the regular season with a franchise-best record of 108–54, winning the National League East division by 21 1/2 games over the division rival Philadelphia Phillies. They then won a tightly contested 1986 National League Championship Series against the Houston Astros, 4 games to 2, clinching the series with a 7–6, 16-inning win in Game 6. On July 19, Mets' infielder Tim Teufel and pitchers Rick Aguilera, Bobby Ojeda, and Ron Darling were arrested after fighting with policemen outside a bar in Houston. Just three days later, the Mets played a game in Cincinnati that saw Ray Knight, Darryl Strawberry, and Kevin Mitchell get ejected, forcing starting catcher Gary Carter to play third base and the Mets to play a pitcher in the outfield, with lefty Jesse Orosco and right-hander Roger McDowell alternating between the pitcher's mound and the outfield as needed. Despite the adversity, the Mets won the game, 6–3 in 14 innings, on a three-run homer by Howard Johnson.

=== Boston Red Sox ===
Boston went 95–66 during the season, winning the American League East division by 5 1/2 games over their biggest nemesis, the New York Yankees, marking the first time since 1904 that the Red Sox and the Yankees finished first and second in the standings.

The gritty play of eventual ALCS MVP Marty Barrett and Rich Gedman; clutch hitting from veterans Jim Rice, Wade Boggs, Don Baylor, Dwight Evans and Dave Henderson; and quality starting pitching, especially from 1986 American League MVP and Cy Young Award winner Roger Clemens, Bruce Hurst and Oil Can Boyd, pushed the Red Sox to the World Series. The team's defining moment occurred in Game 5 of the 1986 American League Championship Series against the California Angels. With the Angels leading three games to one in the best-of-seven series and their top reliever Donnie Moore on the mound, the Sox needed a last-out miracle home run from Henderson to survive Game 5; they later loaded the bases and got the go-ahead run on a sacrifice fly from Henderson off Moore in the 11th. The Angels never recovered from this blow, and with Boston capitalizing on some defensive miscues by the Angels, and clutch performances by some of their big name players (namely Rice and Clemens in the deciding game), the Red Sox clinched the pennant with a seven-game series win.

== Summary ==
NL New York Mets (4) beat AL Boston Red Sox (3)

Game	Date	Score	Location	Time	Attendance
1	October 18	Boston Red Sox – 1, New York Mets – 0	Shea Stadium	2:59	55,076
2	October 19	Boston Red Sox – 9, New York Mets – 3	Shea Stadium	3:36	55,063
3	October 21	New York Mets – 7, Boston Red Sox – 1	Fenway Park	2:58	33,595
4	October 22	New York Mets – 6, Boston Red Sox – 2	Fenway Park	3:22	33,920
5	October 23	New York Mets – 2, Boston Red Sox – 4	Fenway Park	3:09	34,010
6	October 25	Boston Red Sox – 5, New York Mets – 6 (10)	Shea Stadium	4:02	55,078
7	October 27†	Boston Red Sox – 5, New York Mets – 8	Shea Stadium	3:11	55,032

†: Postponed from October 26 due to rain

== Matchups ==
=== Game 1 ===
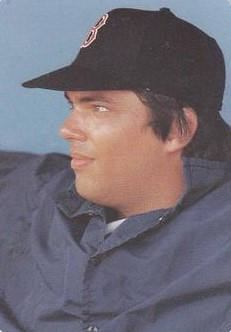
Calvin Schiraldi, the successful relief pitcher of Game 1

Saturday, October 18, 1986 8:30 pm (ET) at Shea Stadium in Queens, New York 51 °F (11 °C), clear
Team	1	2	3	4	5	6	7	8	9	R	H	E
Boston	0	0	0	0	0	0	1	0	0	1	5	0
New York	0	0	0	0	0	0	0	0	0	0	4	1
WP: Bruce Hurst (1–0) LP: Ron Darling (0–1) Sv: Calvin Schiraldi (1)

Just as they did against Houston in the National League Championship Series, the Mets opened the World Series by taking a 1–0 defeat. Boston's Bruce Hurst dominated the Mets with his forkball and looping curve, allowing only four hits over eight innings to get the win. In the bottom of the sixth, Hurst got Ray Knight to ground into an inning-ending double play and thwart a scoring opportunity for the Mets.

New York's Ron Darling was equally effective, yielding only one unearned run in the seventh inning when second baseman Tim Teufel committed an error by letting a ground ball from Rich Gedman go through his legs, allowing Jim Rice to score from second. Red Sox closer Calvin Schiraldi, acquired from the Mets in the previous offseason, walked Darryl Strawberry to lead off the bottom of the ninth inning. However, Schiraldi got Knight to force out Strawberry at second base and then got Wally Backman to fly out to left field. With two outs, Danny Heep pinch hit for Rafael Santana. Schiraldi worked Heep to a 2–2 count and then struck him out swinging to solidify the victory.

Mets' legend Tom Seaver, now a member of the Red Sox, received a standing ovation from the Shea Stadium fans during the Game 1 introductions. Seaver did not pitch in the series because of a knee injury.

=== Game 2 ===
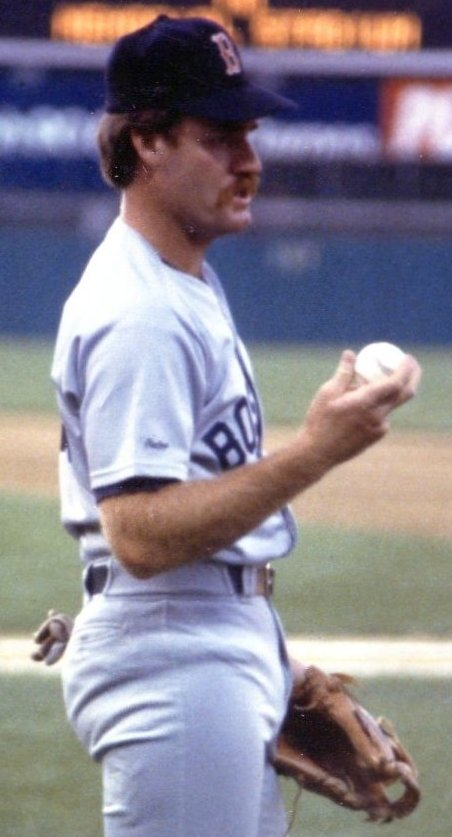
Wade Boggs drove in the first run of Game 2.

Sunday, October 19, 1986 8:25 pm (ET) at Shea Stadium in Queens, New York 54 °F (12 °C), clear
Team	1	2	3	4	5	6	7	8	9	R	H	E
Boston	0	0	3	1	2	0	2	0	1	9	18	0
New York	0	0	2	0	1	0	0	0	0	3	8	1
WP: Steve Crawford (1–0) LP: Dwight Gooden (0–1) Sv: Bob Stanley (1); Home runs: BOS: Dave Henderson (1), Dwight Evans (1); NYM: None

Game 2 figured to be a classic pitching matchup, between the Mets' young phenom Dwight Gooden and Boston's own young pitching sensation Roger Clemens, but neither pitcher went beyond five innings. The Red Sox scored first in the top of the third inning, following a leadoff walk to Spike Owen, when Keith Hernandez fielded a Clemens bunt, but threw it away trying to catch Owen at second base. Wade Boggs then drove in Owen with a double, Marty Barrett drove in Clemens with a single, and Bill Buckner drove in Boggs with a single to give the Sox a 3–0 lead. In the bottom half of the inning, the Mets had men on second and third base for Wally Backman, who grounded up the middle, plating Rafael Santana. Hernandez then grounded out, allowing Gooden to score and bring the Mets within one run.

In the top of the fourth inning, Dave Henderson, the hero of the ALCS, drove the second pitch from Gooden to left-center field for a home run. Dwight Evans followed with a two-run home run in the top of the fifth inning, bringing the score to 6–2. Although Clemens had a comfortable lead going into the bottom of the fifth, he was pulled in favor of Steve Crawford after facing three batters, leaving runners on first and third. Crawford promptly gave up a single to Gary Carter that scored Backman, cutting the deficit to three runs. Crawford struck out Darryl Strawberry and got Danny Heep to ground out, but this left Clemens with a no decision.

Gooden was relieved by Rick Aguilera in the sixth inning. Aguilera loaded the bases in the seventh, and after consecutive RBI singles by Henderson and Owen, was pulled in favor of Jesse Orosco, who shut down the Red Sox over the next two innings.

The Red Sox were not done, however. Facing Sid Fernandez, pitching in relief with runners on first and second base in the ninth inning, Boggs drove in Henderson with a double to make the score 9–3. The Mets were unable to recover from this deficit, and took the loss, giving Boston a 2–0 advantage heading to Fenway Park.

=== Game 3 ===
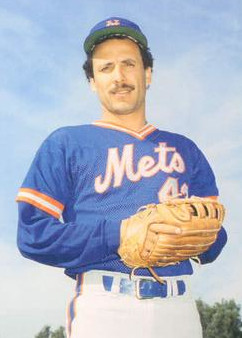
Bob Ojeda, the winning pitcher of Game 3

Tuesday, October 21, 1986 8:30 pm (ET) at Fenway Park in Boston, Massachusetts 62 °F (17 °C), mostly cloudy
Team	1	2	3	4	5	6	7	8	9	R	H	E
New York	4	0	0	0	0	0	2	1	0	7	13	0
Boston	0	0	1	0	0	0	0	0	0	1	5	0
WP: Bob Ojeda (1–0) LP: Oil Can Boyd (0–1); Home runs: NYM: Lenny Dykstra (1); BOS: None

Mets manager Davey Johnson gave his team a day off from practice and interviews with the media just before game 3, thinking it would make his team more focused and re-energize them after their exhausting NLCS win over the Astros. Johnson's plan worked as the Mets started well when Lenny Dykstra led off the game with a home run. After two singles, Gary Carter followed with an RBI double, and Danny Heep drove in two runners with a single to give the Mets a 4–0 lead in the first inning. After the rocky start, Red Sox starter Oil Can Boyd settled down, but Bob Ojeda pitched well and Boston was unable to overcome their early deficit. In his first at bat of the World Series, Boston's Don Baylor almost homered in the second inning but hit the Green Monster, resulting in a double.

Ojeda gave up an RBI single to Marty Barrett in the bottom of the third inning, but this would be the only Boston run of the game. Carter drove in two runners with a bases-loaded single in the seventh inning, and Ray Knight drove in Darryl Strawberry, who had singled and moved to third on two wild pitches, with a double in the eighth inning off of Joe Sambito. Roger McDowell pitched the final two frames to seal a 7–1 Mets victory.

=== Game 4 ===
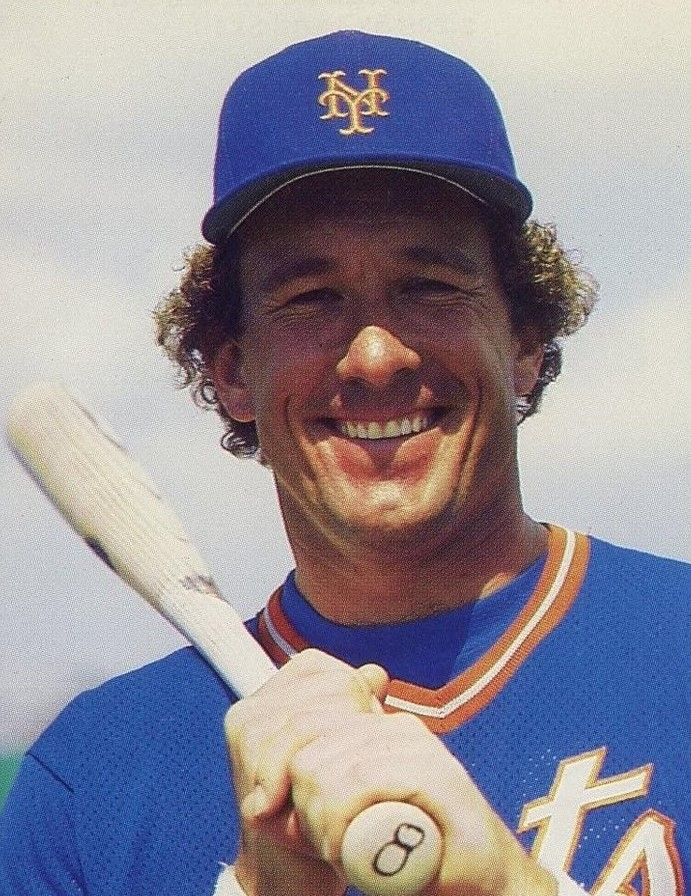
Gary Carter hit two home runs in Game 4, the only multi-home run game in the Series.

Wednesday, October 22, 1986 8:25 pm (ET) at Fenway Park in Boston, Massachusetts 58 °F (14 °C), mostly clear
Team	1	2	3	4	5	6	7	8	9	R	H	E
New York	0	0	0	3	0	0	2	1	0	6	12	0
Boston	0	0	0	0	0	0	0	2	0	2	7	1
WP: Ron Darling (1–1) LP: Al Nipper (0–1) Sv: Jesse Orosco (1); Home runs: NYM: Gary Carter 2 (2), Lenny Dykstra (2); BOS: None

Ron Darling faced off against Boston's Al Nipper, as the Mets looked to tie the Series. Neither starter allowed a run until the top of the fourth inning, when Gary Carter ripped a two-run home run over the Green Monster and Ray Knight drove in Darryl Strawberry, who had doubled after the home run, with a single. In the top of the seventh inning, Boston right fielder Dwight Evans almost robbed Lenny Dykstra of a two-run home run only for the ball to bounce out of his glove and over the wall. TV replay showed Evans taking off his hat and leaning against the wall in disappointment and frustration. Carter hit a solo shot in the top of the eighth inning, both Dykstra's and Carter's second home run came off of Steve Crawford.

In the eighth inning, the Red Sox scored two runs on an Evans single and a Dave Henderson sacrifice fly off of Roger McDowell, but it was not enough, and the Mets evened the series at two games apiece to ensure a return to New York.

=== Game 5 ===
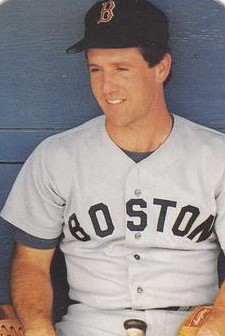
Marty Barrett continued his torrid hitting pace in Game 5 with his fourth straight multi-hit game; he would finish as both the final batter of the Series and with the most hits at 13.

Thursday, October 23, 1986 8:35 pm (ET) at Fenway Park in Boston, Massachusetts 63 °F (17 °C), partly cloudy
Team	1	2	3	4	5	6	7	8	9	R	H	E
New York	0	0	0	0	0	0	0	1	1	2	10	1
Boston	0	1	1	0	2	0	0	0	X	4	12	0
WP: Bruce Hurst (2–0) LP: Dwight Gooden (0–2); Home runs: NYM: Tim Teufel (1); BOS: None

The Red Sox struck first in the second when Dave Henderson tripled with one out off of Dwight Gooden and scored on Spike Owen's sacrifice fly. Dwight Evans's RBI single next inning with two on made it 2–0 Red Sox. In the fifth, Jim Rice hit a leadoff triple and scored on Don Baylor's single. After Evans singled, Sid Fernandez relieved Gooden and allowed an RBI double to Henderson. Bruce Hurst pitched 7 1/3 shutout innings before Tim Teufel's home run in the eighth put the Mets on the board. In the ninth, Mookie Wilson doubled with two outs and scored on Rafael Santana's single before Hurst struck out Lenny Dykstra to end the game as the Red Sox's 4–2 gave them a 3–2 series lead heading back to New York.

=== Game 6 ===
Saturday, October 25, 1986 8:25 pm (ET) at Shea Stadium in Queens, New York 52 °F (11 °C), overcast
Team	1	2	3	4	5	6	7	8	9	10	R	H	E
Boston	1	1	0	0	0	0	1	0	0	2	5	13	3
New York	0	0	0	0	2	0	0	1	0	3	6	8	2
WP: Rick Aguilera (1–0) LP: Calvin Schiraldi (0–1); Home runs: BOS: Dave Henderson (2); NYM: None

The series returned to Shea Stadium for Game 6 with the Mets facing elimination. Bob Ojeda, the winner of Game 3, returned to the mound for New York. The Red Sox countered with Roger Clemens, who despite the team's victory in his Game 2 start did not factor into the decision as he was pulled from the game in the fifth inning.

The game was briefly paused in the top of the first, with Bill Buckner at bat, as actor and Mets fan Michael Sergio parachuted onto the field wearing a flag reading "Go Mets". He was immediately arrested by security after landing.

In the first two innings, Boston took a quick 2–0 lead on RBI base hits from Dwight Evans and Marty Barrett. Those would be the only runs Ojeda allowed in six innings. The Mets tied the score in the fifth inning on a single from Ray Knight and a run-scoring double play by Danny Heep, in his last at-bat as a Met.

After the Mets left the go-ahead run on base in the sixth, the Red Sox came to bat in the top of the seventh against New York reliever Roger McDowell. Barrett started off the inning by drawing a walk, then advanced to second on a groundout by Bill Buckner. Jim Rice then hit a ground ball to third that Knight misplayed, putting runners on the corners with one out. McDowell then got Evans to ground out to the left side, but since Boston had called for a hit-and-run, the Mets were unable to convert a double play and get out of the inning; Barrett scored on the groundout to give the Red Sox the lead. The Mets avoided further damage, though, as Rice was thrown out at home after trying to score from second on a single by Rich Gedman for the third out.

In the top of the eighth, McDowell walked Dave Henderson to start the inning. After Spike Owen laid down a sacrifice bunt, advancing Henderson to second, the pitcher's spot was due next. Although Clemens had struck out eight Mets batters and had only allowed one earned run to this point in the game, manager John McNamara decided to call for a pinch hitter. Despite having power hitting veteran Don Baylor on his bench, McNamara chose to send up rookie Mike Greenwell as he felt the matchup against McDowell favored him. Greenwell responded by striking out on three pitches. After intentionally walking Wade Boggs next, McDowell walked Barrett to load the bases. Jesse Orosco came in to face Buckner, inducing a first-pitch fly out to end the inning.

It was initially said that Clemens was removed from the game due to a blister forming on one of his fingers, but both he and McNamara dispute this. Clemens said to Bob Costas on an MLB Network program concerning the 1986 postseason that McNamara decided to pull him despite Clemens wanting to pitch. McNamara said to Costas that Clemens "begged out" of the game. Regardless of who was really telling the truth, the Red Sox had been warming up closer Calvin Schiraldi in the prior innings and, with him ready, McNamara brought him in to pitch the eighth.

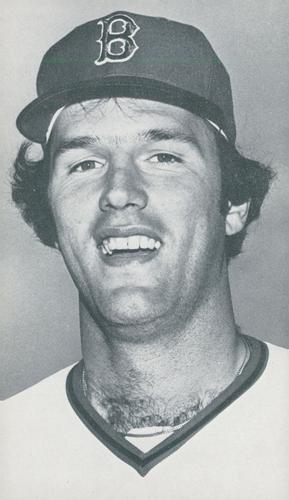
Bob Stanley's wild pitch allowed the tying run to score in the bottom of the 10th inning.

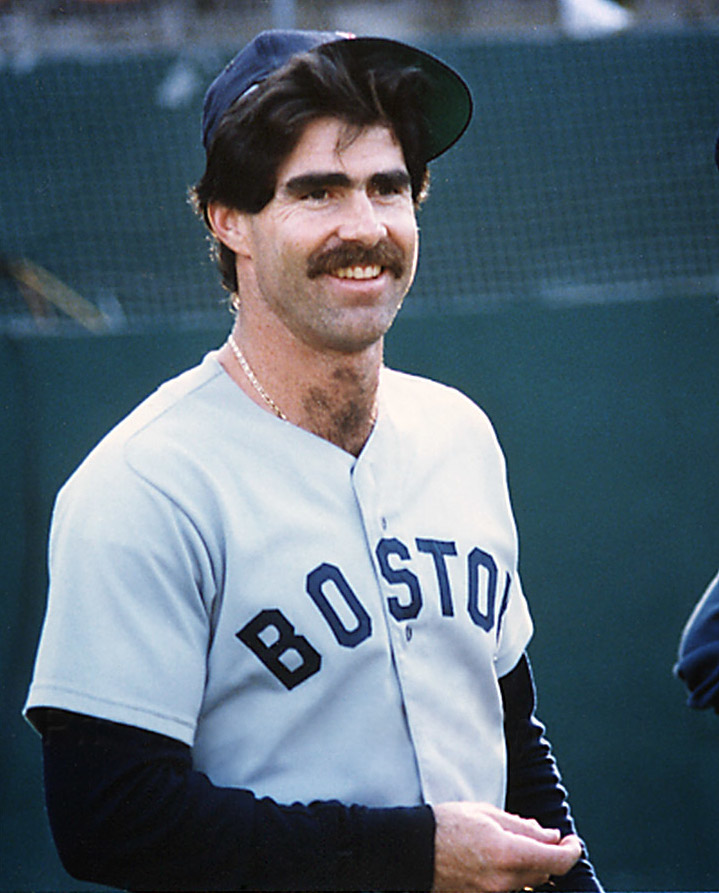
Bill Buckner's tenth-inning error remains one of the most memorable plays in baseball history; it was long considered part of a curse on the Red Sox that kept them from winning the World Series.

Pinch hitter Lee Mazzilli, batting for Orosco, led off the inning with a single. Lenny Dykstra then reached on an attempted sacrifice to put two runners on. Wally Backman followed with another bunt to move Mazzilli and Dykstra into scoring position, and Schiraldi intentionally walked Keith Hernandez to load the bases for Gary Carter. Schiraldi ran up a 3–0 count on Carter, but Carter swung at the next pitch and flied to left, deep enough to score Mazzilli and tie the game. With Dykstra now on third, Darryl Strawberry stood in with a chance to drive in the go-ahead run, but flied out to end the inning.

After the Red Sox failed to score against Rick Aguilera in the top of the ninth, the Mets came up with a chance to win the game. Knight started the inning by drawing a walk off Schiraldi. Mookie Wilson was then asked to lay down a bunt to try to move the runner up to second. The bunt landed directly in front of home plate and catcher Gedman saw he had a play at second and threw there to try and get the lead runner. His throw was high, however, and pulled shortstop Owen off the base long enough for Knight to slide in safely. Owen, Barrett, and McNamara argued that second base umpire Jim Evans made the wrong call, with McNamara saying he could not have seen Owen's foot land back on the bag, but television replays showed that Knight's hand touched just before Owen got his foot back down.

With a runner now in scoring position and still nobody out, Howard Johnson came on to pinch hit. Mets manager Davey Johnson had been expected by the Red Sox to call for a bunt in order to move Knight to third base, where he could score on a deep fly ball, but the play was not called and Johnson struck out. Schiraldi then got Mazzilli out on a fly ball to left, failing to advance Knight to third, and followed that up with another fly out off the bat of Dykstra to end the inning and move the game to extra innings.

In the visiting tenth, Henderson hit Aguilera's second pitch of the inning out of the park for a 4–3 Boston lead. After getting Owen to strike out, the first of two opportunities for McNamara to utilize his bench, where he had several pinch-hitting options including Baylor still available, came up with the pitcher's spot now due. McNamara, however, sent Schiraldi to the plate despite having both Joe Sambito and Bob Stanley, the latter having not recorded a single earned run in the postseason to that point, in the bullpen ready to go. Aguilera retired Schiraldi on a strikeout for the second out.

Boggs then followed with a double, and Barrett drove him in with a single to give the Red Sox an insurance run and a 5–3 lead. The second chance for McNamara to use his bench followed. The veteran first baseman Buckner was the next batter, and in many cases where Boston would be leading late in games McNamara would take Buckner out and replace him with Dave Stapleton at first base, as he had done in all three previous Red Sox victories in this series. This time, he did not, even after Aguilera drilled the veteran first baseman in the hip with a pitch. Rice, the next batter, ended the inning with a flyout to Mazzilli.

When asked later about his decision to leave Buckner in the game, McNamara initially said that he felt that he deserved to stay on the field for the potential final out to preserve the victory and the championship. Buckner, after all, was the third-oldest Red Sox player behind Baylor and Tom Seaver (who was not on the postseason roster), and was an 18-year veteran who had only seen action in one prior World Series, which came when he was a member of the Los Angeles Dodgers in the 1974 World Series. Years later, McNamara changed his story and said that the reason why had nothing to do with sentimentality and instead said that Stapleton, who said McNamara's decision cost the Red Sox the series, was not a reliable defender and that his teammates had taken to calling him "Shaky" as a result; in spite of McNamara's assertion, Stapleton had only committed one error at first base since Buckner joined the Red Sox in 1984 and, in his last two full seasons at first base, had recorded fielding percentages of .991 and .992 respectively.

Needing to rally for the second time in three innings, and now having to overcome a two-run deficit, the Mets' first two batters in the tenth went quietly against Schiraldi. Backman flew out to left, and Hernandez flew out to center. With Carter now New York's last hope, the words "Congratulations Boston Red Sox, 1986 World Champions" briefly and accidentally flashed on the scoreboard.

The celebration, however, was put on hold as Carter singled to bring the tying run to the plate. Had he not come out in the ninth inning, Strawberry would have been the next batter. However, Mazzilli had taken his place in the field when Aguilera was brought in to pitch the ninth inning; as a result of the double switch, the pitcher's spot was now due and Johnson called for utility man Kevin Mitchell to pinch hit for Aguilera, who stood to lose the game as the pitcher of record unless the Mets somehow rallied to at least tie the game.

A story about the sequence of events that followed, which has been relayed several times over the years and denied by Mitchell in the years following, says that Mitchell had left the dugout and gone back to the Mets' clubhouse after Hernandez flew out in order to book a flight home after the game and had taken his uniform off. Hernandez, who had himself gone to the clubhouse after recording the second out, later said on a 2023 episode of The Rich Eisen Show that the story was half true; Mitchell was in the clubhouse with him, but was still in uniform when he was called to pinch hit. Despite the rush, the rookie utility man came through with a single of his own, advancing Carter to second and putting the tying run on base with Knight, now the potential winning run, coming up. According to Mitchell's retelling years later, when he went to bat, he recalled a conversation he had with Schiraldi when they played in the minor leagues together, where Schiraldi said that if he ever pitched to Mitchell, he would throw fastballs inside and sliders away, and was looking for the slider when Schiraldi threw it.

Schiraldi got two quick strikes on the Mets' third baseman, who had already driven in one run so far. However, with his team within one strike of that elusive championship, he could not finish the job as Knight singled to left-center. Carter scored from second standing up, and the speedy Mitchell advanced to third. Finally, McNamara decided his closer had seen enough and called for the veteran Stanley to try to close out the game. Some later speculated as to why Stanley, who had been warmed up by the time the tenth inning began, had not been called upon earlier instead of McNamara asking for a third inning out of Schiraldi, who had already blown the save in the eighth.

The Mets' next batter was Wilson, who had recorded one hit and reached on a fielder's choice after the bad throw by Gedman in the ninth. Six pitches into the at-bat, with the count even at two balls and two strikes, Stanley threw a breaking ball that broke sharply inside and bounced in front of Wilson, who fell down trying to avoid it. Gedman tried to field the ball but could not, and it rolled to the backstop. Mitchell, who'd just been advised by Mets third-base coach Bud Harrelson to be alert for possible wild pitches, due to Stanley's sinker occasionally bouncing in the dirt, quickly ran home to score and tie the game at five.

Knight advanced to second on the wild pitch. Several times during the ensuing series of pitches, second baseman Barrett realized that Knight was straying too far from the base and that if he could get Stanley to turn and throw to him, he would have an easy pickoff play and the inning could have ended there. Despite his best attempts, Barrett never was able to get Stanley to hear him as the sellout crowd at Shea Stadium was drowning him out, and Stanley instead chose to focus on getting Wilson out.

On the tenth pitch of the at-bat, Stanley finally got Wilson to put the ball in play, forcing a ground ball to first base. Buckner had been playing near the foul line to give himself a better chance to get the speedy Wilson out on a ground ball, but when he went to field the ball, it went by his glove and through his legs into right field. Knight scored from second, completing the rally and giving the Mets a 6–5 victory to tie the series and force a seventh game.

In the 2011 ESPN Films documentary Catching Hell, Buckner explained how, years after the event, he realized from watching a television replay how he had missed the ball. He said, when he played in the field, he liked to wear a very loose glove – i.e. one that was floppy. When he moved to his left to try to field Wilson's grounder and then stopped, the momentum of the leftward-moving loose glove caused the glove to close. The ball then went just past the right side of the glove. In his 2023 appearance with Rich Eisen, Hernandez remarked that, because Buckner had spent a significant part of his career playing in the National League, he was more than familiar with Wilson and his base-running speed. As such, he took his normal position near the line to give himself the best chance to get the out at first; Hernandez said that if it was any other hitter in the Mets lineup but Wilson, Buckner would have been able to get the out.

After the top of the tenth, NBC began setting up in the visiting clubhouse for what they believed was the inevitable postgame victory celebration. The Commissioner's Trophy had been brought into the Red Sox clubhouse along with several bottles of champagne, team co-owner/president Jean Yawkey and pitcher Bruce Hurst (who had already been named the series MVP by the sportswriters) with Bob Costas ready to preside over the presentation. However, after Stanley's wild pitch in the bottom of the tenth, everything was quickly struck and removed from the room before the Red Sox returned. Costas later recalled the removal of all the equipment for the postgame celebration as being "like a scene change in a Broadway musical. In, out, gone, not a trace."

In 2011, MLB Network ranked this as the third greatest game of the preceding 50 years. It was the last World Series game to end on an error until Game 4 of the 2020 World Series.

In the years that have followed, many fans regardless of team allegiance consider Game 6 of the 1986 World Series to be one of the greatest games ever played in the history of professional baseball.

=== Game 7 ===
Monday, October 27, 1986 8:25 pm (ET) at Shea Stadium in Queens, New York 53 °F (12 °C), light fog
Team	1	2	3	4	5	6	7	8	9	R	H	E
Boston	0	3	0	0	0	0	0	2	0	5	9	0
New York	0	0	0	0	0	3	3	2	X	8	10	0
WP: Roger McDowell (1–0) LP: Calvin Schiraldi (0–2) Sv: Jesse Orosco (2); Home runs: BOS: Dwight Evans (2), Rich Gedman (1); NYM: Ray Knight (1), Darryl Strawberry (1)

In the hours that followed the end of Game 6, a rainstorm passed over the New York metropolitan area. The field at Shea Stadium was rendered unplayable and Game 7 was postponed one night, moving to Monday, October 27.

The pitching matchup was originally supposed to feature Ron Darling, the starter for Games 1 and 4 who had yet to allow an earned run in the World Series, going up against Oil Can Boyd, who started and lost Game 3 by giving up six runs.

The rainout offered a chance for both managers to adjust their pitching strategies if they desired. The Mets had been using a three-man rotation with each of their starters pitching on three days' rest, with Darling followed by Dwight Gooden and then Bob Ojeda. Instead of throwing Gooden, his ace, in Game 7 on three days' rest, manager Davey Johnson stuck with his rotation and gave the start to Darling, who was now pitching on his normal four days' rest.

The Red Sox, however, decided to go in a different direction. Bruce Hurst, who as mentioned above would have been the series MVP had the Red Sox won Game 6, gained a third day of rest with the rainout and, since he had pitched so well in his two starts in the series against the Mets in Games 1 and 5, manager John McNamara gave him the ball for the decisive Game 7.

Boyd did not take kindly to being replaced by Hurst. After he disappeared into the clubhouse and had been missing for some time, McNamara dispatched pitching coach Bill Fischer to find him. When Fischer discovered Oil Can in the clubhouse, Boyd was so heavily intoxicated that he could not even function, much less be available to pitch if he was needed. Fischer moved Boyd into the manager's office where he locked the door and left him for the entire game.

In the 500th game played in World Series history, Boston got to Darling early, recording three runs in the second inning. Dwight Evans and Rich Gedman hit back to back home runs to lead the inning off and with two out, Wade Boggs drove in Dave Henderson with a single for a 3–0 Red Sox lead.

Gedman's home run was noteworthy for several reasons: It occurred on the first pitch after a delay of just over three minutes during which portable stands down the first base line had to be restored after several fans reaching for a foul ball had caused them to collapse. The subsequent pitch by Darling, which came on a two-strike count (1–2), led to Gedman's home run. However, the ball was almost caught by Darryl Strawberry, who was reaching over the right-field wall. Fortunately for the Red Sox, the ball fell out of Strawberry's glove and cleared the fence for a 2–0 Boston lead. If Strawberry had recorded the out, the inning may have ended with only one Boston run instead of three, as three batters later, Red Sox pitcher Bruce Hurst would have stepped to the plate to bat with two outs instead of in a sacrifice situation, which he successfully converted to set up Boggs' run-scoring hit.

The Mets, meanwhile, could not muster much against Hurst and through three innings had only recorded one hit.

In the fourth Henderson reached after Darling hit him with a pitch. After Spike Owen flew out, Hurst laid down a bunt that moved Henderson into scoring position. Johnson then lifted Darling from the game and brought in Sid Fernandez to face Boggs and the leading hitter of the series, Marty Barrett. Boggs managed to draw a walk, but Fernandez retired Barrett on a fly ball to right field to end the inning.

The Mets still did not have an answer for Hurst through the fourth and fifth innings, going down in order in both frames. The Red Sox, conversely, went down in order against Fernandez in the fifth and sixth, which kept the deficit at three. In the bottom of the inning, the Mets were finally able to break through against their series nemesis and turn the tide in their favor.

After Hurst got the first out when Rafael Santana grounded out, Lee Mazzilli came up to pinch-hit for Fernandez and singled. Mookie Wilson followed with a single of his own, and second baseman Tim Teufel drew a walk to load the bases. Keith Hernandez then drove the lead runners in with a single, and Wally Backman came in to run for Teufel representing the tying run.

Gary Carter was the next batter and he lifted a fly ball to Evans in right. The veteran outfielder had to dive in order to catch it, and was unable to come up with the catch. Right field umpire Dale Ford did not immediately rule that there was no catch, which crossed up Hernandez on the basepath; since the ball was ruled to be in play, he had to attempt to advance to second base. Since there was a delay in the ruling, Evans was able to throw back into the infield and force out Hernandez at second. Backman managed to score on the play to tie the game, but the Mets lost the opportunity to have Darryl Strawberry come up with a chance to drive in the go ahead run; instead, Hurst got him to fly out and escaped further damage. Hurst was lifted for a pinch hitter after this inning.

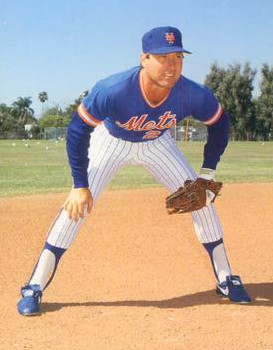
Ray Knight hit a leadoff home run in the seventh inning to break a 3–3 tie in what turned out to be the first of three Met runs.

Roger McDowell entered the game for the Mets in the seventh and retired pinch-hitter Tony Armas, Boggs, and Barrett in order. McNamara called upon Game 6 loser Calvin Schiraldi to pitch the home half of the inning, despite his struggles in the extended outing he had two nights earlier. The day of rest did not help, as he immediately surrendered a home run to Ray Knight (playing in what would be his final game as a Met) leading off, giving the Mets their first lead of the game. Lenny Dykstra came up as a pinch-hitter and singled, then advanced to second on a wild pitch and scored on a single by Santana. After McDowell successfully moved Santana into scoring position, McNamara decided to take the ball from Schiraldi and brought in Joe Sambito. After putting Wilson on intentionally, Sambito walked Backman to load the bases and Hernandez followed with a sacrifice fly to score Santana and give the Mets a three-run advantage. Bob Stanley recorded the final out by getting Carter to ground out to Owen at shortstop.

Down to their last six outs, Boston had not had a runner reach base since Boggs' walk in the fourth inning. Jim Rice had recorded the last Red Sox hit, a single in the third, but had been thrown out trying to stretch it into a double. They tried to rally against McDowell in the eighth and Bill Buckner led the inning off with a single. Rice followed with another single, and Evans doubled after that to make the score 6–5 and bring Gedman to the plate with the potential go-ahead run. Needing to stop the rally, Johnson pulled McDowell in favor of his closer Jesse Orosco to face the Red Sox catcher. After inducing a line drive to second that Backman caught for the first out, Orosco struck out Henderson for the second out and then got Don Baylor, batting for Owen, to ground out and end the Boston rally.

In the bottom of the eighth, the Mets finally were able to put the game away at the expense of Game 4 loser Al Nipper. Strawberry led the inning off with a solo home run, and Knight singled and advanced to second on a groundout by Dykstra. Santana was intentionally walked to get to the pitcher's spot, but Orosco not only came to bat but also managed to drive Knight in as he swung away on a fake bunt attempt to extend the lead back to three. Steve Crawford then came in to face Wilson and hit him, loading the bases. Backman then grounded into a force retiring Santana, and Hernandez grounded out and ended the inning.

Staked to an 8–5 lead, Orosco faced Ed Romero, who took over at shortstop for Owen in the eighth, to start the top of the ninth and retired him on a foul pop. Boggs then grounded out to Backman at second, leaving Barrett as the last hope for the Red Sox. Orosco worked a 2–2 count before getting Barrett to swing and miss, then tossed his glove high into the air and dropped to his knees as the Mets all converged on the mound to celebrate their world championship victory.

McDowell was awarded the victory, with Orosco garnering his second save of the series. Schiraldi was saddled with the loss for the second consecutive game, having been charged with all three runs the Mets scored in the seventh in one-third of an inning. He gave up seven runs in his final two outings of the series.

Due to the rainout, this game coincided with another sporting event taking place in the New York metropolitan area that night. The New York Giants were taking on the Washington Redskins at Giants Stadium on Monday Night Football, with the kickoff happening approximately thirty minutes after Game 7 started. Many of the fans at the football game, which sold out, were following along with the baseball game and cheering loudly during high points of the game. When Orosco recorded the final out, the Giants were driving late in the third quarter and a collective roar went up from the crowd as the stadium scoreboard operator flashed “METS WIN” on the board to inform the fans of the result. The Giants would later win Super Bowl XXI, following in the Mets lead in winning their championship.

== Awards and statistical summary ==
The World Series MVP was awarded to Ray Knight, who led the Mets' regulars with nine hits and a .393 average in the series. He also recorded five runs batted in, second to Gary Carter's nine.

Marty Barrett, in a losing effort, recorded 13 hits – tying the single World Series record – and a .433 average. Dave Henderson recorded ten hits and a .400 average, while Jim Rice and Wade Boggs each had nine hits.

Despite the struggles both pitchers faced in Game 7, both Bruce Hurst and Ron Darling were the best starting pitchers on their respective staffs during the World Series. Both finished with 2–0 records and sub-2.00 ERAs, with Darling's 1.35 ERA topping Hurst's 1.96 although Hurst issued fewer walks and struck out more batters. Hurst had been voted MVP prior to the Mets' Game 6 comeback, but that comeback, and the Mets' Game 7 victory, kept Bobby Richardson of the 1960 New York Yankees as the only World Series MVP from a losing team.

The only other starter to win a decision was Bob Ojeda. Steve Crawford won Game 2 for the Red Sox while Rick Aguilera and Roger McDowell won Games 6 and 7 for the Mets. In fact, the record for the starting pitchers for both teams outside of Darling and Hurst was 1–4, with two of those losses recorded by Mets ace Dwight Gooden. His counterpart on the Red Sox, eventual Cy Young Award winner Roger Clemens, did not record a decision in either of his starts.

== Series statistics ==
=== Boston Red Sox ===
==== Batting ====
Note: GP=Games played; AB=At bats; R=Runs; H=Hits; 2B=Doubles; 3B=Triples; HR=Home runs; RBI=Runs batted in; BB=Walks; AVG=Batting average; OBP=On base percentage; SLG=Slugging percentage

Player	GP	AB	R	H	2B	3B	HR	RBI	BB	AVG	OBP	SLG	Reference
Rich Gedman	7	30	1	6	1	0	1	1	0	.200	.200	.333	
Bill Buckner	7	32	2	6	0	0	0	1	0	.188	.212	.188	
Marty Barrett	7	30	1	13	2	0	0	4	5	.433	.514	.500	
Wade Boggs	7	31	3	9	3	0	0	3	4	.290	.371	.387	
Spike Owen	7	20	2	6	0	0	0	2	5	.300	.423	.300	
Jim Rice	7	27	6	9	1	1	0	0	6	.333	.455	.444	
Dave Henderson	7	25	6	10	1	1	2	5	2	.400	.448	.760	
Dwight Evans	7	26	4	8	2	0	2	9	4	.308	.400	.615	
Don Baylor	4	11	1	2	1	0	0	1	1	.182	.308	.273	
Mike Greenwell	4	3	0	0	0	0	0	0	1	.000	.250	.000	
Tony Armas	1	1	0	0	0	0	0	0	0	.000	.000	.000	
Ed Romero	3	1	0	0	0	0	0	0	0	.000	.000	.000	
Dave Stapleton	3	1	0	0	0	0	0	0	0	.000	.000	.000	
Roger Clemens	2	4	1	0	0	0	0	0	0	.000	.000	.000	
Bruce Hurst	3	3	0	0	0	0	0	0	0	.000	.000	.000	
Bob Stanley	5	1	0	0	0	0	0	0	0	.000	.000	.000	
Steve Crawford	3	1	0	0	0	0	0	0	0	.000	.000	.000	
Calvin Schiraldi	3	1	0	0	0	0	0	0	0	.000	.000	.000	

==== Pitching ====
Note: G=Games Played; GS=Games Started; IP=Innings Pitched; H=Hits; BB=Walks; R=Runs; ER=Earned Runs; SO=Strikeouts; W=Wins; L=Losses; SV=Saves; ERA=Earned Run Average

Player	G	GS	IP	H	BB	R	ER	SO	W	L	SV	ERA	Reference
Roger Clemens	2	2	11 1/3	9	6	5	4	11	0	0	0	3.18	
Bruce Hurst	3	3	23	18	6	5	5	17	2	0	0	1.96	
Bob Stanley	5	0	6 1/3	5	1	0	0	4	0	0	1	0.00	
Steve Crawford	3	0	4 1/3	5	0	3	3	4	1	0	0	6.23	
Calvin Schiraldi	3	0	4	7	3	7	6	2	0	2	1	13.50	
Oil Can Boyd	1	1	7	9	1	6	6	3	0	1	0	7.71	
Al Nipper	2	1	6 1/3	10	2	5	5	2	0	1	0	7.11	
Joe Sambito	2	0	0 1/3	2	2	1	1	0	0	0	0	27.00	

=== New York Mets ===
==== Batting ====
Note: GP=Games played; AB=At bats; R=Runs; H=Hits; 2B=Doubles; 3B=Triples; HR=Home runs; RBI=Runs batted in; BB=Walks; AVG=Batting average; OBP=On base percentage; SLG=Slugging percentage

Player	GP	AB	R	H	2B	3B	HR	RBI	BB	AVG	OBP	SLG	Reference
Gary Carter	7	29	4	8	2	0	2	9	0	.276	.267	.552	
Keith Hernandez	7	26	1	6	0	0	0	4	5	.231	.344	.231	
Wally Backman	6	18	4	6	0	0	0	1	3	.333	.429	.333	
Ray Knight	6	23	4	9	1	0	1	5	2	.391	.440	.565	
Rafael Santana	7	20	3	5	0	0	0	2	2	.250	.318	.250	
Mookie Wilson	7	26	3	7	1	0	0	0	1	.269	.321	.308	
Lenny Dykstra	7	27	4	8	0	0	2	3	2	.296	.345	.519	
Darryl Strawberry	7	24	4	5	1	0	1	1	4	.208	.321	.375	
Danny Heep	5	11	0	1	0	0	0	2	1	.091	.167	.091	
Tim Teufel	3	9	1	4	1	0	1	1	1	.444	.500	.889	
Kevin Mitchell	5	8	1	2	0	0	0	0	0	.250	.250	.250	
Howard Johnson	2	5	0	0	0	0	0	0	0	.000	.000	.000	
Lee Mazzilli	4	5	2	2	0	0	0	0	0	.400	.400	.400	
Kevin Elster	1	1	0	0	0	0	0	0	0	.000	.000	.000	
Ron Darling	3	3	0	0	0	0	0	0	0	.000	.000	.000	
Bob Ojeda	2	2	0	0	0	0	0	0	0	.000	.000	.000	
Dwight Gooden	2	2	1	1	0	0	0	0	0	.500	.500	.500	
Jesse Orosco	4	1	0	1	0	0	0	1	0	1.000	1.000	1.000	

==== Pitching ====
Note: G=Games Played; GS=Games Started; IP=Innings Pitched; H=Hits; BB=Walks; R=Runs; ER=Earned Runs; SO=Strikeouts; W=Wins; L=Losses; SV=Saves; ERA=Earned Run Average

Player	G	GS	IP	H	BB	R	ER	SO	W	L	SV	ERA	Reference
Ron Darling	3	3	17 2/3	13	10	4	3	12	1	1	0	1.53	
Bob Ojeda	2	2	13	13	5	3	3	9	1	0	0	2.08	
Dwight Gooden	2	2	9	17	4	10	8	9	0	2	0	8.00	
Jesse Orosco	4	0	5 2/3	2	0	0	0	6	0	0	2	0.00	
Roger McDowell	5	0	7 1/3	10	6	5	4	2	1	0	0	4.91	
Sid Fernandez	3	0	6 2/3	6	1	1	1	10	0	0	0	1.35	
Rick Aguilera	2	0	3	8	1	4	4	4	1	0	0	12.00	
Doug Sisk	1	0	0 2/3	0	1	0	0	1	0	0	0	0.00	

== Postscript ==
Both the Mets and Red Sox would go without reaching the World Series for some time. The Red Sox would not return until 2004, where they would finally break through and win their first title since 1918. They have gone on to win three additional world championships, most recently in 2018. As of 2024, this remains the most recent time the Red Sox have lost a World Series title.

The Mets have returned to the World Series twice since 1986. In 2000, the first time since 1956 that two teams from the same city faced each other in the World Series, the Mets lost to the New York Yankees. The Mets returned in 2015, only to lose again to the Kansas City Royals.

Neither Davey Johnson nor John McNamara would manage in another World Series. Johnson stayed on with the Mets until 1990, leading them to another postseason berth in 1988 that ended with a loss to the Los Angeles Dodgers in the National League Championship Series. He was fired early in the 1990 season. Johnson would later lead the Cincinnati Reds to the playoffs in 1995, then followed that with two more playoff runs with the Baltimore Orioles in 1996 and 1997. He finished his managerial career in 2013 with the Washington Nationals.

McNamara returned for 1987 with the Red Sox, but the team regressed significantly, finishing with only 78 wins. He would be fired the next year with the Red Sox barely above .500 at the All-Star break, and his successor Joe Morgan led the team to a comeback and division title. He would take over the Cleveland Indians in 1990, but was fired midway through 1991 with the team at 25–52. He would only manage once more after that, an interim position with the California Angels in 1996, before retiring. He died in July 2020 at the age of 88.

Bill Buckner never did win that elusive World Series ring. He would be released by the Red Sox during the 1987 season, then spend the rest of the year with the California Angels. In 1988, he signed with the Kansas City Royals and played more of a reserve role for the last three years of his career, which ended in 1990 after a second stint with the Red Sox. Buckner's error made him a scapegoat in Red Sox fans' eyes for some time afterward, but following their world championship victory in 2004 the fanbase began to embrace him again. In his later years, Buckner developed Lewy body dementia, and he died from complications at the age of 69 in May 2019.

Hedge fund manager and current Mets owner, Steven A. Cohen, revealed in an interview that he currently owns the Buckner ball from Game 6. He has stated that he would donate the ball to the Mets Museum at Citi Field.

In 2020, ESPN named the 1986 World Series the fourth greatest of all time.

On September 14 and 15, 2021, ESPN premiered Once Upon a Time in Queens, its four-part 30 for 30 documentary about the 1986 World Series, the Mets' seasons leading up to it and the aftermath. The film is directed by Nick Davis.

Because of the involvement of both of the Yankees' rivals (both their traditional one and their cross-city counterparts), this World Series was called "(George) Steinbrenner's nightmare". As a result, then-Yankee owner George Steinbrenner wrote articles in the New York Post during this Series.

After seven years, this would be the final World Series to use the logo introduced in the 1980 series. Beginning the next year, a new logo in the style of a baseball diamond was introduced. The logo itself would receive minor updates throughout the years. In 1992, gold lettering was added which would remain for the rest of its tenure until it was retired altogether after the 1997 series.

== Composite line score ==
1986 World Series (4–3): New York Mets (N.L.) beat Boston Red Sox (A.L.)

Team	1	2	3	4	5	6	7	8	9	10	R	H	E
New York Mets	4	0	2	3	3	3	7	6	1	3	32	65	5
Boston Red Sox	1	5	5	1	4	0	4	4	1	2	27	69	4
Total attendance: 321,774 Average attendance: 45,967; Winning player's share: $86,254 Losing player's share: $74,986

== Broadcast ==
NBC's broadcast of Game 6 did not end until 12:32 a.m. Eastern, causing the first cancellation of an episode of NBC's Saturday Night Live in the show's history. The episode, hosted by Rosanna Arquette and scheduled to air live at 11:30 p.m. Eastern, was instead recorded for the studio audience beginning at 1:30 a.m., and aired November 8 with a comedic apology from Ron Darling. (NBC generally no longer schedules first-run SNL episodes on the same night as sports coverage.)

NBC's broadcast of Game 7 (which went up against a Monday Night Football game between the Washington Redskins and New York Giants held at nearby Giants Stadium on ABC) garnered a Nielsen rating of 38.9 and a 55 share, making it the highest-rated single World Series game to date.

== In popular culture ==
In the 1998 film Rounders, Matt Damon's character (Mike McDermott) references Game 6 while returning into Teddy KGB's place in the final scene. "I feel like Buckner walking back into Shea."

In the 2005 film Fever Pitch, the main character played by Jimmy Fallon, a die hard Red Sox fan, watches a tape of the ending to Game 6 to get over what looks to be his break up with his girlfriend.

The collapse of the Boston Red Sox in Game 6 and Game 7 prompted a series of articles by George Vecsey of The New York Times, in which he mentions a "Babe Ruth Curse." Although it had long been noted that the selling of Babe Ruth to the New York Yankees had marked the beginning of a down period in the Red Sox's fortunes, this was one of the first instances, if not the first, in which mention of a "curse" was made. The term "Curse of the Bambino" was not in common use by the press during the 1920s, nor can it be found through the 1970s, as a search of historical newspapers will illustrate. In fact, even though Vecsey's articles mention a "Babe Ruth Curse", the New York Times did not use the phrase "Curse of the Bambino" until 1990, the year that Dan Shaughnessy's book of the same name and a Boston Globe article about it were published. Shaughnessy's book The Curse of the Bambino helped that phrase become a key part of the Red Sox lore in the media thereafter.

The dramatic sixth game was the subject of Game 6, a 2005 independent film starring Michael Keaton, based on a 1991 screenplay by novelist Don DeLillo.

Village Voice film critic J. Hoberman included Game 6 in his list of the top ten films of 1986.

In his song "Faith and Fear in Flushing Meadows", twee/folk artist Harry Breitner makes mention of Ray Knight and Mookie Wilson.

The game, or more specifically an infamous jeer that was issued in the game against Darryl Strawberry, was referenced in The Simpsons episode "Homer at the Bat" where Bart and Lisa jeer Strawberry the exact same way due to being sore over his forcing Homer to remain on the bench.

NBC's telecast of the Series ended with the song "Limelight" from Stereotomy, a penultimate album of The Alan Parsons Project.

The Series, and especially Game 6, were referenced in the Seinfeld episode "The Boyfriend", which also guest starred former Mets player Keith Hernandez. Hernandez being referred to Game 6 in the episode suggested that he was part of the winning rally, even though he was the 2nd (and final) out of the inning, though Hernandez was a big part of the prior round's Game 6 rally in the 9th inning.

In a 1999 episode of The King of Queens ("Rayny Day"), Doug Heffernan promises Richie Ianucci that they will watch the Series that is being rerun on TV, only to abandon him for Ray Barone, who invites him to play golf (with Arthur Spooner tagging along) until a rainstorm ends their plans. In another episode from the same year ("Where's Poppa?"), Doug and his cousin Danny bring up the Series while revisiting their high school years.

In the Curb Your Enthusiasm episode "Mister Softee", Bill Buckner appears as a guest star and mocks his famous 1986 mishap by missing a crucial catch of a Mookie Wilson-signed baseball. As the episode concludes, he redeems himself by catching a baby thrown from a burning building.

In 2001, playwright David Kruh had his play Curse of the Bambino premiere at the Boston Lyric Stage. After the 2004 World Series it was rewritten with a happier ending.

In Ron Darling's book, 108 Stitches, he claims that during Game 3. Lenny Dykstra used racial epithets toward Oil Can Boyd. Dykstra sued Darling over this. The case was later dismissed.

In the 2005 film Bewitched starring Will Ferrell and Nicole Kidman, there's a scene in which Jack (Ferrell) asks Isabel (Kidman) if her parents were in the witch business, Isabel answered that both her parents are and that her mother fixed the 1986 World Series.

In the Boy Meets World episode "Career Day" Cory is embarrassed by his dad Allen's presentation of his career as a grocer in front of the class. When he talks to Shawn about this in the lunchroom, he references the Bill Buckner play. "Do you remember that uh, that World Series game where the first baseman let that EASY ground ball go under his legs and his team lost and he was humiliated in front of the entire world? (Shawn replies "Yeah?") I envy his son." Later in the episode, Allen uses the same analogy while talking to his wife at home. "Do you remember the World Series where that first baseman let that grounder dribble through his uh, legs? (Yeah?) I envy him."

== See also ==
- 1986 Japan Series
- Bill Buckner's 1986 World Series error
