= 1986 American League Championship Series =

18th edition of Major League Baseball's American League Championship Series

Team (Wins)	Managers	Season
Boston Red Sox (4)	John McNamara	95–66, .590, GA: 5½
California Angels (3)	Gene Mauch	92–70, .568, GA: 5
- Dates: October 7–15
- MVP: Marty Barrett (Boston)
- Umpires: Larry Barnett (crew chief); Larry McCoy; Terry Cooney; Nick Bremigan; Rocky Roe; Rich Garcia

Broadcast
- Television: ABC
- TV announcers: Al Michaels and Jim Palmer
- Radio: CBS
- Radio announcers: Ernie Harwell and Curt Gowdy

The 1986 American League Championship Series was a best-of-seven semifinal series in Major League Baseball's 1986 postseason between the Boston Red Sox and the California Angels for the right to advance to the 1986 World Series to face the winner of the 1986 National League Championship Series. The Red Sox came in with a 95–66 record and the AL East division title, while the Angels went 92–70 during the regular season to win the AL West.

== Summary ==
=== Boston Red Sox vs. California Angels ===
The Eastern division champion held home field advantage for the third consecutive year in the ALCS. Between 1969-84, the home field advantage alternated between the West in odd-numbered years and the East in even-numbered years. In 1987, that alternation resumed and continued through 1993.

Boston won the series, 4–3.

Game	Date	Score	Location	Time	Attendance
1	October 7	California Angels – 8, Boston Red Sox – 1	Fenway Park	2:52	32,993
2	October 8	California Angels – 2, Boston Red Sox – 9	Fenway Park	2:47	32,786
3	October 10	Boston Red Sox – 3, California Angels – 5	Anaheim Stadium	2:48	64,206
4	October 11	Boston Red Sox – 3, California Angels – 4 (11)	Anaheim Stadium	3:50	64,223
5	October 12	Boston Red Sox – 7, California Angels – 6 (11)	Anaheim Stadium	3:54	64,223
6	October 14	California Angels – 4, Boston Red Sox – 10	Fenway Park	3:23	32,998
7	October 15	California Angels – 1, Boston Red Sox – 8	Fenway Park	2:39	33,001

== Game summaries ==
=== Game 1 ===
Tuesday, October 7, 1986, at Fenway Park in Boston, Massachusetts

Team	1	2	3	4	5	6	7	8	9	R	H	E
California	0	4	1	0	0	0	0	3	0	8	11	0
Boston	0	0	0	0	0	1	0	0	0	1	5	1
WP: Mike Witt (1–0) LP: Roger Clemens (0–1)

Angels left fielder Brian Downing went 2-for-5 with four RBI and Mike Witt pitched a five-hit complete game, allowing just one run in the sixth on Marty Barrett's RBI single after a two-out walk and single. After getting two outs, Red Sox starter Roger Clemens walked two in the second before Ruppert Jones's RBI single, Wally Joyner's RBI double, and Downing's two-run single put the Angels up 4–0. Gary Pettis's RBI single with two on extended their lead to 5–0, the run unearned due to shortstop Spike Owen's throwing error to first on Bob Boone's ground-ball. In the eighth, Dick Schofield singled with one out, stole second and scored on Boone's single. After a Pettis single, Joe Sambito relieved Clemens and allowed a two-out walk to load the bases, then Downing's two-run single capped the game's scoring at 8–1 as the Angels took a 1–0 series lead.

=== Game 2 ===
Wednesday, October 8, 1986, at Fenway Park in Boston, Massachusetts

Team	1	2	3	4	5	6	7	8	9	R	H	E
California	0	0	0	1	1	0	0	0	0	2	11	3
Boston	1	1	0	0	1	0	3	3	X	9	13	2
WP: Bruce Hurst (1–0) LP: Kirk McCaskill (0–1); Home runs: CAL: Wally Joyner (1); BOS: Jim Rice (1)

The next day, the tables were turned. The Red Sox struck first in the bottom of the first when Wade Boggs hit a leadoff triple off Kirk McCaskill and scored on Marty Barrett's double. Barrett's bases-loaded RBI single next inning made it 2–0 Red Sox, but Bill Buckner hit into an inning-ending double play to limit the damage. Dick Schofield's bases-loaded single in the fourth cut the Red Sox's lead to 2–1, but Bruce Hurst retired the next two batters to keep them in front. Next inning, Wally Joyner's home run tied the game, but in the bottom half, Dwight Evans's RBI double with two on put the Red Sox ahead for good, 3–2. Boston padded its lead in the seventh. An error, single and walk loaded the bases with one out before another error on Evans's ground ball allowed one run to score and keep the bases loaded, then a third error on Rich Gedman's force out allowed two more runs to score. Next inning, Buckner's sacrifice fly with runners on first and third off Gary Lucas made it 7–2 Red Sox before Jim Rice's home run off Doug Corbett capped the game's scoring at 9–2. Hurst pitched a complete game as the Red Sox tied the series 1–1 heading to California.

=== Game 3 ===
Friday, October 10, 1986, at Anaheim Stadium in Anaheim, California

Team	1	2	3	4	5	6	7	8	9	R	H	E
Boston	0	1	0	0	0	0	0	2	0	3	9	1
California	0	0	0	0	0	1	3	1	X	5	8	0
WP: John Candelaria (1–0) LP: Oil Can Boyd (0–1) Sv: Donnie Moore (1); Home runs: BOS: None; CAL: Dick Schofield (1), Gary Pettis (1)

In Game 3, the Red Sox struck first in the second on Rich Gedman's RBI single with two on off John Candelaria, but after pitching five shutout innings, Oil Can Boyd allowed a game-tying RBI single to Reggie Jackson in the sixth. Dick Schofield's two-out home run in the seventh put the Angels up 2–1. After Bob Boone singled, Gary Pettis's two-run home run extended their lead to 4–1. The Red Sox scored two runs in the eighth on Donnie Moore's balk with runners on second and third and Gedman's RBI single, but the Angels padded their lead in the bottom half on Ruppert Jones's sacrifice fly off Calvin Schiraldi. Moore pitched a scoreless ninth as the Angels went up 2–1 in the series with a 5–3 win. During the game, scoring on Reggie Jackson's single, Wally Joyner suffered an opened staph infection, which would sideline him for the rest of the series.

=== Game 4 ===
Saturday, October 11, 1986, at Anaheim Stadium in Anaheim, California

Team	1	2	3	4	5	6	7	8	9	10	11	R	H	E
Boston	0	0	0	0	0	1	0	2	0	0	0	3	6	1
California	0	0	0	0	0	0	0	0	3	0	1	4	11	2
WP: Doug Corbett (1–0) LP: Calvin Schiraldi (0–1); Home runs: BOS: None; CAL: Doug DeCinces (1)

Roger Clemens, the Game 1 loser for the Red Sox, started Game 4, and was solid for most of the game. Boston put up a run in the sixth on Bill Buckner's RBI double with two on off Don Sutton. In the eighth, Spike Owen hit a leadoff single off Vern Ruhle, moved to third on a groundout and wild pitch, then scored on Marty Barrett's single. Chuck Finley relieved Ruhle and a passed ball and error on Buckner's ground ball allowed Barrett to score to make it 3–0 Red Sox. Another error and walk off Doug Corbett loaded the bases, but Rich Gedman hit into a forceout to end the inning. In the bottom of the ninth, Doug DeCinces led off with a home run. After the next batter grounded out, Dick Schofield and Bob Boone singled. After coming within two outs of a complete game, Clemens was removed, and Boone was replaced with a pinch runner. Gary Pettis, batting next, doubled to score Schofield. Ruppert Jones was intentionally walked to load the bases, a fatal mistake, as two batters later, Brian Downing was hit by a pitch, bringing in the tying run.

Angels relief pitcher Doug Corbett pitched a perfect tenth and eleventh innings, and California broke through in the bottom of the 11th.innings Jerry Narron scored on Bobby Grich's one-out single off Calvin Schiraldi, giving California a 4–3 win and a 3–1 series lead.

=== Game 5 ===
Sunday, October 12, 1986, at Anaheim Stadium in Anaheim, California

Team	1	2	3	4	5	6	7	8	9	10	11	R	H	E
Boston	0	2	0	0	0	0	0	0	4	0	1	7	12	0
California	0	0	1	0	0	2	2	0	1	0	0	6	13	0
WP: Steve Crawford (1–0) LP: Donnie Moore (0–1) Sv: Calvin Schiraldi (1); Home runs: BOS: Rich Gedman (1), Don Baylor (1), Dave Henderson (1); CAL: Bob Boone (1), Bobby Grich (1)

Heading into Game 5, California looked set to earn its first trip to a World Series. Rich Gedman's two-run home run in the second put the Red Sox up 2–0, but Bob Boone's home run off Bruce Hurst in the third cut the lead to 2–1. Bobby Grich, the previous night's hero, hit a two-run home run to give the Halos a 3–2 lead in the sixth inning; Red Sox center fielder Dave Henderson had tried to leap at the wall to catch Grich's long fly ball, but ended up deflecting it over the fence. The Angels added to their lead in the seventh inning off Bob Stanley on Rob Wilfong's RBI double with two on and Brian Downing's bases-loaded sacrifice fly.

In the ninth, Mike Witt allowed a leadoff single to Bill Buckner but struck out Jim Rice, putting him two outs away from his second complete game victory of the series. The next batter, Don Baylor, hit a two-strike, two-run home run to pull the Red Sox within one run. After retiring the next batter, Witt was replaced. Gary Lucas was brought in to face catcher Rich Gedman who had been 3 for 3 in the game against Witt, including a double and a home run. Lucas, on the other hand, had a history of striking Gedman out. But with his very first pitch, Lucas hit Gedman, and was replaced by Donnie Moore. The Angels closer brought his team within one strike of its first AL pennant, but Henderson caught hold of a Moore forkball and launched a home run into the left field stands, stunning the hometown crowd and greatly redeeming himself for his earlier miscue. Boston had taken a 6–5 lead.

The lead would not last, however, as in the bottom of the ninth, Bob Boone singled off Stanley, and Ruppert Jones pinch-ran for him. Gary Pettis sacrificed Jones to second, and Wilfong singled him home off Joe Sambito, tying the game. Dick Schofield then singled, sending Wilfong to third, and Downing was intentionally walked to load the bases with only one out. All of Boston's top-half heroics would have been washed away with a mere sacrifice fly at this point. But instead, Doug DeCinces only managed to hit a short fly ball to right field. Grich's subsequent line-out to pitcher Steve Crawford ended the inning.

The teams settled down and the tenth inning was again scoreless, but the Red Sox loaded the bases in the top of the 11th off Donnie Moore on a hit-by-pitch and two singles for Henderson. He hit a sacrifice fly, scoring Baylor with the go-ahead run. Calvin Schiraldi then retired the Halos in order in the bottom of the 11th, completing a shocking comeback and sending the series back to Boston.

=== Game 6 ===
Tuesday, October 14, 1986, at Fenway Park in Boston, Massachusetts

Team	1	2	3	4	5	6	7	8	9	R	H	E
California	2	0	0	0	0	0	1	1	0	4	11	1
Boston	2	0	5	0	1	0	2	0	X	10	16	1
WP: Oil Can Boyd (1–1) LP: Kirk McCaskill (0–2); Home runs: CAL: Brian Downing (1); BOS: None

Still reeling from their Game 5 loss, the Angels struck first in the top of the first off Oil Can Boyd on back-to-back two-out RBI doubles by Reggie Jackson and Doug DeCinces after a one-out walk, but the Red Sox tied the game in the bottom of the inning off Kirk McCaskill without a hit. With runners on second and third and one out via two walks and a groundout, a passed ball and Jim Rice's groundout scored both runners. In the third, after back-to-back leadoff singles, Marty Barrett's RBI double put the Red Sox up 3–2, then Bill Buckner's RBI single extended their lead to 4–2. After a forceout at home, Don Baylor's two-run single (aided by first baseman Bobby Grich's throwing error) and Dwight Evans's RBI single made it 7–2 Red Sox. Dave Henderson's bases-loaded groundout off Doug Corbett in the fifth made it 8–2 Red Sox. Brian Downing hit a home run in the top of the seventh off Boyd, but in the bottom of the inning, Spike Owen's two-run triple off Corbett after a single and walk made it 10–3 Red Sox. The Angels got a run in the eighth off Bob Stanley on shortstop Owen's throwing error on Rob Wilfong with Dick Schofield at second, but could not score again as the Red Sox's 10–4 win forced a deciding Game 7.

=== Game 7 ===
Wednesday, October 15, 1986, at Fenway Park in Boston, Massachusetts

Team	1	2	3	4	5	6	7	8	9	R	H	E
California	0	0	0	0	0	0	0	1	0	1	6	2
Boston	0	3	0	4	0	0	1	0	X	8	8	1
WP: Roger Clemens (1–1) LP: John Candelaria (1–1); Home runs: CAL: None; BOS: Jim Rice (2), Dwight Evans (1)

With momentum fully on their side in Game 7, the Red Sox loaded the bases in the second off John Candelaria with no outs on an error, single and walk. Rich Gedman's groundout scored a run and after an intentional walk reloaded the bases, Wade Boggs's two-run single made it 3–0 Red Sox. In the fourth Dave Henderson reached third on an error, then scored on Spike Owen's single. After a two-out walk, Jim Rice's three-run home run made it 7–0 Red Sox, all runs unearned. Dwight Evans's home run in the seventh off Don Sutton made it 8–0 Red Sox. The Angels scored their only run of the game on Doug DeCinces's RBI single off Calvin Schiraldi, the run charged to starter Roger Clemens. Schiraldi pitched two innings to close as the Red Sox advanced to the World Series with an 8–1 win after trailing the series three games to one. It was their first pennant in 11 years.

== Composite box ==
1986 ALCS (4–3): Boston Red Sox over California Angels

Team	1	2	3	4	5	6	7	8	9	10	11	R	H	E
Boston Red Sox	3	7	5	4	2	2	6	7	4	0	1	41	69	7
California Angels	2	4	2	1	1	3	6	6	4	0	1	30	71	8
Total attendance: 324,430 Average attendance: 46,347

== Series Statistics ==
=== Boston Red Sox ===
==== Batting ====
Note: GP=Games played; AB=At bats; R=Runs; H=Hits; 2B=Doubles; 3B=Triples; HR=Home runs; RBI=Runs batted in; BB=Walks; AVG=Batting average; OBP=On base percentage; SLG=Slugging percentage

Player	GP	AB	R	H	2B	3B	HR	RBI	BB	AVG	OBP	SLG	Reference
Rich Gedman	7	28	4	10	1	0	1	6	0	.357	.379	.500	
Bill Buckner	7	28	3	6	1	0	0	3	0	.214	.207	.250	
Marty Barrett	7	30	4	11	2	0	0	5	2	.367	.406	.433	
Wade Boggs	7	30	3	7	1	1	0	2	4	.233	.324	.333	
Spike Owen	7	21	5	9	0	1	0	3	2	.429	.478	.524	
Jim Rice	7	31	8	5	1	0	2	6	1	.161	.188	.387	
Tony Armas	5	16	1	2	1	0	0	0	0	.125	.125	.188	
Dwight Evans	7	28	2	6	1	0	1	4	3	.214	.290	.357	
Don Baylor	7	26	6	9	3	0	1	2	4	.346	.469	.577	
Dave Henderson	5	9	3	1	0	0	1	4	2	.111	.250	.444	
Dave Stapleton	4	3	2	2	0	0	0	0	1	.667	.750	.667	
Mike Greenwell	2	2	0	1	0	0	0	0	0	.500	.500	.500	
Ed Romero	1	2	0	0	0	0	0	0	0	.000	.000	.000	

==== Pitching ====
Note: G=Games Played; GS=Games Started; IP=Innings Pitched; H=Hits; BB=Walks; R=Runs; ER=Earned Runs; SO=Strikeouts; W=Wins; L=Losses; SV=Saves; ERA=Earned Run Average

Player	G	GS	IP	H	BB	R	ER	SO	W	L	SV	ERA	Reference
Oil Can Boyd	2	2	13 2/3	17	3	7	7	8	1	1	0	4.61	
Roger Clemens	3	3	22 2/3	22	7	12	11	17	1	1	0	4.37	
Steve Crawford	1	0	1 2/3	1	2	0	0	1	1	0	0	0.00	
Bruce Hurst	2	2	15	18	1	5	4	8	1	0	0	2.40	
Joe Sambito	3	0	0 2/3	1	1	0	0	0	0	0	0	0.00	
Calvin Schiraldi	4	0	6	5	3	2	1	9	0	1	1	1.50	
Bob Stanley	3	0	5 2/3	7	3	4	3	1	0	0	0	4.76	

=== California Angels ===
==== Batting ====
Note: GP=Games played; AB=At bats; R=Runs; H=Hits; 2B=Doubles; 3B=Triples; HR=Home runs; RBI=Runs batted in; BB=Walks; AVG=Batting average; OBP=On base percentage; SLG=Slugging percentage

Player	GP	AB	R	H	2B	3B	HR	RBI	BB	AVG	OBP	SLG	Reference
Bob Boone	7	22	4	10	0	0	1	2	1	.455	.500	.591	
Bobby Grich	6	24	1	5	0	0	1	3	0	.208	.269	.333	
Rob Wilfong	4	13	1	4	1	0	0	2	0	.308	.308	.385	
Doug DeCinces	7	32	2	9	3	0	1	3	0	.281	.281	.469	
Dick Schofield	7	30	4	9	1	0	1	2	1	.300	.323	.433	
Brian Downing	7	27	2	6	0	0	1	7	4	.222	.333	.333	
Gary Pettis	7	26	4	9	1	0	1	4	3	.346	.414	.500	
Ruppert Jones	6	17	4	3	1	0	0	2	5	.176	.348	.235	
Reggie Jackson	6	26	2	5	2	0	0	2	2	.192	.250	.269	
George Hendrick	3	12	0	1	0	0	0	0	0	.083	.083	.083	
Rick Burleson	4	11	0	3	0	0	0	0	0	.273	.273	.237	
Wally Joyner	3	11	3	5	2	0	1	2	2	.455	.538	.909	
Jerry Narron	4	2	1	1	0	0	0	0	1	.500	.667	.500	
Devon White	4	2	2	1	0	0	0	0	0	.500	.500	.500	
Jack Howell	2	1	0	0	0	0	0	0	1	.000	.500	.000	

==== Pitching ====
Note: G=Games Played; GS=Games Started; IP=Innings Pitched; H=Hits; BB=Walks; R=Runs; ER=Earned Runs; SO=Strikeouts; W=Wins; L=Losses; SV=Saves; ERA=Earned Run Average

Player	G	GS	IP	H	BB	R	ER	SO	W	L	SV	ERA	Reference
Mike Witt	2	2	17 2/3	13	2	5	5	8	1	0	0	2.55	
John Candelaria	2	2	10 2/3	11	6	8	1	7	1	1	0	0.84	
Don Sutton	2	1	9 2/3	6	1	2	2	4	0	0	0	1.86	
Kirk McCaskill	2	2	9 1/3	16	5	13	8	7	0	2	0	7.71	
Doug Corbett	3	0	6 2/3	9	2	4	4	2	1	0	0	5.40	
Donnie Moore	3	0	5	8	2	4	4	0	0	1	1	7.20	
Gary Lucas	4	0	2 1/3	3	1	3	3	2	0	0	0	11.57	
Chuck Finley	3	0	2	1	0	0	0	1	0	0	0	0.00	
Vern Ruhle	1	0	0 2/3	2	0	2	1	0	0	0	0	13.50	

== Aftermath ==
By virtue of winning the ALCS, the Red Sox advanced to the 1986 World Series, where they faced the New York Mets, with memorable results. Like the Angels in the ALCS, the Red Sox found themselves one strike away from winning the World Series, yet could not hold the lead. Taking a 5–3 lead into the bottom of the tenth inning of Game 6, the Red Sox gave up three runs, culminating in an infamous ground ball through the legs of Bill Buckner to hand the Mets a 6–5 victory. The Mets would go on to win Game 7 and the Series.

As for the Angels, Donnie Moore was regarded the scapegoat of the series for giving up Henderson's home run in Game 5, and then his game-winning sacrifice fly two innings later. Moore was blasted by the sports media, as well as the fans. He sank into depression and alcoholism over the next two years, and committed suicide on July 18, 1989, just one year after his MLB career ended.

The 1986 ALCS was Reggie Jackson’s last playoff series. He retired the following season in 1987, playing for the team that originally drafted him, the Oakland Athletics. Nicknamed "Mr. October", Jackson always seemed to elevate his game during the biggest moments. He finished his career hitting .278/.358/.527 with 18 home runs in 77 career games in the postseason, which was highlighted by two World Series MVPs in 1973 and 1977.

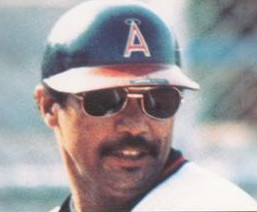
Reggie Jackson during batting practice with the California Angels.

1986 was also Gene Mauch's last chance at winning a pennant. In his 26 years as manager, his name became linked with coming up just short, coming three times within a single victory of reaching a World Series. In 1964, his Philadelphia Phillies suffered a dramatic collapse during the final two weeks of the season, squandering a 6 1/2 game lead with 12 games to play. The "Phold of '64", as it became known, was one of the most infamous regular season collapses in baseball history. Mauch won two division titles in his managerial career (both with the Angels) and three NL Manager of the Year Awards. Many of his fellow managers considered him the most insightful and tactical manager in his day, including Alvin Dark; although one of the important reasons his teams never reached the highest heights was that "he didn't understand pitching", according to Dark. Mauch retired in 1987 with 3,942 games managed and 1,902 games won, by far the winningest manager to have never won a league pennant.

In retrospect, most people consider the 1986 postseason to be one of the best (if not the best) postseasons of all time, as it not only was exciting but also made up for a lackluster regular season, in which the Red Sox, Angels, Mets, and Houston Astros all won their divisions handily.

In 2002, the Angels would finally have their moment(s) of glory. They would win the American League Wild Card, as well as their Division Series (dethroning the four-time defending A.L. champion N.Y. Yankees in four games), their first pennant (over Minnesota in five games), and their first World Series title (over San Francisco in seven games).

In 2004, the Angels and Red Sox met in the American League Division Series with the Red Sox sweeping the series. The Red Sox would eventually go on to defeat the New York Yankees for their first pennant since 1986 and also win their first World Series title since 1918 against the St. Louis Cardinals.

In 2007, the Angels and Red Sox met again in the ALDS. The Red Sox again swept the series, continuing their domination of the Halos in the postseason. From Game 4 of the 1986 ALCS until Game 3 of the 2008 ALDS, the Angels lost 11 straight playoff games against the Red Sox, who won all four playoff meetings against them in that span. The Red Sox would win the 2008 ALDS three games to one despite losing eight of nine regular season games against the Angels. In 2009, the Angels finally broke through and defeated the Red Sox in a sweep of the ALDS.
