= Tim Teufel =

American baseball player and coach (born 1958)

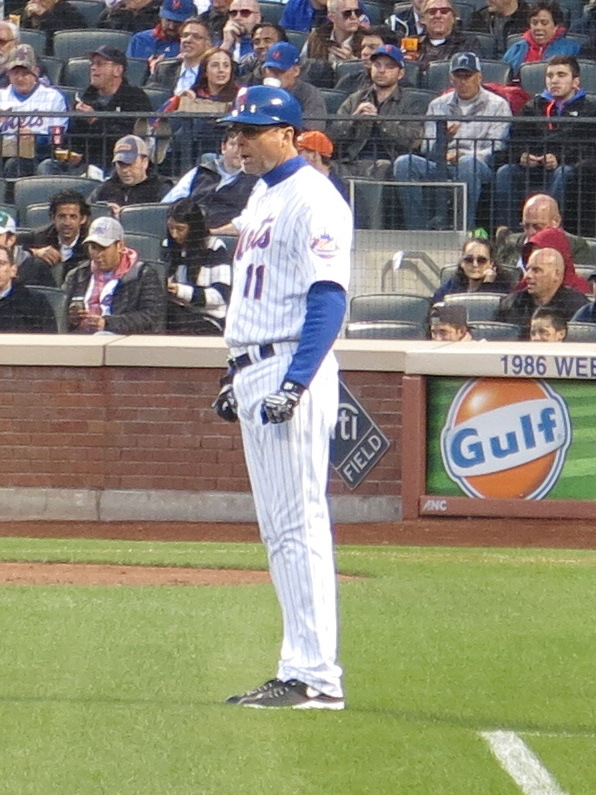
- Teufel as the New York Mets third base coach
- Second baseman
- Born: July 7, 1958 (age 68); Greenwich, Connecticut, U.S.
- Batted: Right Threw: Right

MLB debut
- September 3, 1983, for the Minnesota Twins

Last MLB appearance
- September 28, 1993, for the San Diego Padres

MLB statistics
- Batting average: .254
- Home runs: 86
- Runs batted in: 379
- Stats at Baseball Reference

Teams
- As player: Minnesota Twins (1983–1985); New York Mets (1986–1991); San Diego Padres (1991–1993); As coach: New York Mets (2011–2016)

Career highlights and awards
- World Series champion (1986)

Timothy Shawn Teufel (/ˈtʌfəl/ TUF-əl; born July 7, 1958) is an American former professional baseball second baseman and coach. He played Major League Baseball from 1983 to 1993, most notably as a member of the New York Mets, with whom he won a world championship in 1986. He also played for the Minnesota Twins and the San Diego Padres. He is a member of the Clemson Athletic Hall of Fame. He was a fan favorite with the New York Mets and became known for his batting stance, the "Teufel shuffle", in which he wiggled his buttocks back and forth before the pitcher's delivery.

== Early life ==
Teufel attended St. Mary's High School in Greenwich, Connecticut, St. Petersburg Junior College in St. Petersburg, Florida, and Clemson University in South Carolina. At Clemson, he earned All American honors and participated in the College World Series as a senior in 1980.

In 1979, Teufel played collegiate summer baseball for the Cotuit Kettleers of the Cape Cod Baseball League (CCBL). He batted .351 and set league records for home runs, runs batted in, and runs scored in a season. Teufel was inducted into the CCBL Hall of Fame in 2005.

At age 19, he was drafted by the Milwaukee Brewers in the sixteenth round of the 1978 Major League Baseball draft, but did not sign. Teufel was drafted by the Chicago White Sox in the third round of the secondary phase of the 1979 Major League Baseball draft, but again did not sign. In the 1980 Major League Baseball draft, Teufel was drafted in the second round and signed with the Minnesota Twins.

== Playing career ==
=== Minnesota Twins ===
Teufel spent all of 1980 and 1981 with the Double-A Orlando Twins. He raised his average to .282 in 1982, earning a mid-season promotion to the Triple-A Toledo Mud Hens. In 1983, Teufel lit up the International League with a .323 batting average, 1.022 OPS, 27 home runs and 100 runs batted in, resulting in a September call-up to the majors. He made his major league debut on September 3 in a 13-0 drubbing at the hands of Scott McGregor and the Baltimore Orioles.

Teufel went 2-for-4 and score two runs to help the last-place Twins snap a five-game losing streak on September 6. On September 16, Teufel led off the game by hitting his first major league home run off Jim Gott of the Toronto Blue Jays. His second career home run came in the eighth inning of the same game. In all, Teufel went 5-for-5 with two home runs and five runs scored in arguably the best offensive game of his career. By the end of the season, the Twins surpassed the Seattle Mariners to avoid a last-place finish.

The following season, Teufel snatched the starting second base job away from former Rookie of the Year, John Castino. In his rookie season, Teufel had 149 hits, 30 doubles, fourteen home runs, 61 runs batted in, and provided solid defense at second base for the Twins. The Twins improved to 81–81 in 1984, which was good enough for a second-place finish in the American League West. Teufel finished fourth behind Alvin Davis, Mark Langston and teammate Kirby Puckett in American League Rookie of the Year balloting.

The Twins fell back into fifth place in 1985. Following the season, Teufel was traded with minor leaguer Pat Crosby to the New York Mets for Billy Beane, Bill Latham and Joe Klink.

=== New York Mets ===
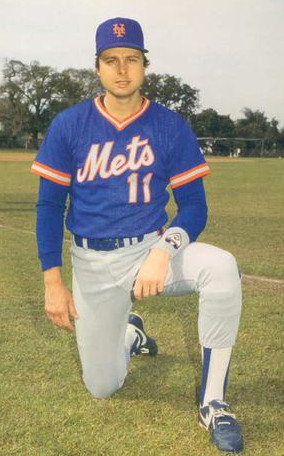
Teufel in 1986

Although Teufel had hit far better against right-handed pitchers in 1985, Mets manager Davey Johnson used Teufel primarily against left-handed pitching in a platoon system with Wally Backman. Teufel started quickly in 1986 with a go-ahead 14th inning single in his first game with the Mets, although they lost in the bottom half of the inning. His batting average hovered around .220 into June. On June 10, Teufel had one of the most exciting moments in the Mets' championship season with a walk-off pinch-hit grand slam in the bottom of the 11th inning against the Philadelphia Phillies.

The Mets' reputation as a rowdy bunch was punctuated on July 19 when Teufel, Ron Darling, Bob Ojeda, and Rick Aguilera were arrested after a bar fight with off-duty police officers in Houston, Texas. Teufel was sentenced to a year of probation and fined $200 for his part. None of the four missed any playing time, though the incident helped fuel some rivalry between the Mets and their impending 1986 National League Championship Series competitors, the Houston Astros. Teufel managed just one hit and no runs batted in against the Astros in the Championship Series, won by the Mets in six games.

In game one of the 1986 World Series against the Boston Red Sox, the Mets suffered a fate similar to that which they suffered in game one of the 1973 World Series against the Oakland Athletics. In that game, usually sure-handed Mets' second baseman Félix Millán committed a third inning error that led to both of Oakland's runs in their 2–1 victory. With one out and a runner on second in the seventh inning of game one of the 1986 series, Boston's Rich Gedman hit a ground ball to Teufel at second which Teufel misplayed, allowing the runner to score. Boston held on for the 1–0 victory.

He hit a home run in game five of the Series, but the Mets lost that game. For the series, Teufel batted .444 with four hits in nine at bats. The home run was the only postseason run batted in and run scored of Teufel's career.

1987 was Teufel's best season statistically, as he tied his 1984 home run and run batted in highs despite playing in only 97 games. His .308 batting average, .398 on-base percentage and .545 slugging percentage were career-highs. Despite significantly outperforming Wally Backman, Teufel continued to be used in a platoon role. He was given the chance to play every day in 1988, but spent all of April below .200 and missed three weeks from mid-May with an injury, causing the platoon to be reinstated.

Teufel was used in just one game in the 1988 NLCS. In 1989, Gregg Jefferies was given most of the time at second base and Teufel spent half of his time at first base. His playing time further decreased in 1990 as he played in career-lows of 80 games with 175 at-bats while shifting between first, second and third base.

=== San Diego Padres ===
Teufel's 1991 average was .118 on May 31 when the Mets traded him to the San Diego Padres for Garry Templeton. Teufel hit between .220 and .250 in all three seasons with San Diego while continuing to play at all three bases defensively. On April 14, 1993, he went 5-for-5 for the second time in his career but the Padres lost the game on their way to a 101-loss season. Teufel was granted free agency and retired after the 1993 season.

== Coaching career ==
Teufel returned to the Mets as a roving instructor for 2001 and 2002. He was named the manager of the Mets' Rookie-level minor league Brooklyn Cyclones for 2003 and was promoted to the Single-A St. Lucie Mets for 2004 and 2005. After the two seasons near .500, the Mets announced Teufel was being replaced by Gary Carter for 2006. Teufel decided to take a break from baseball for the year.

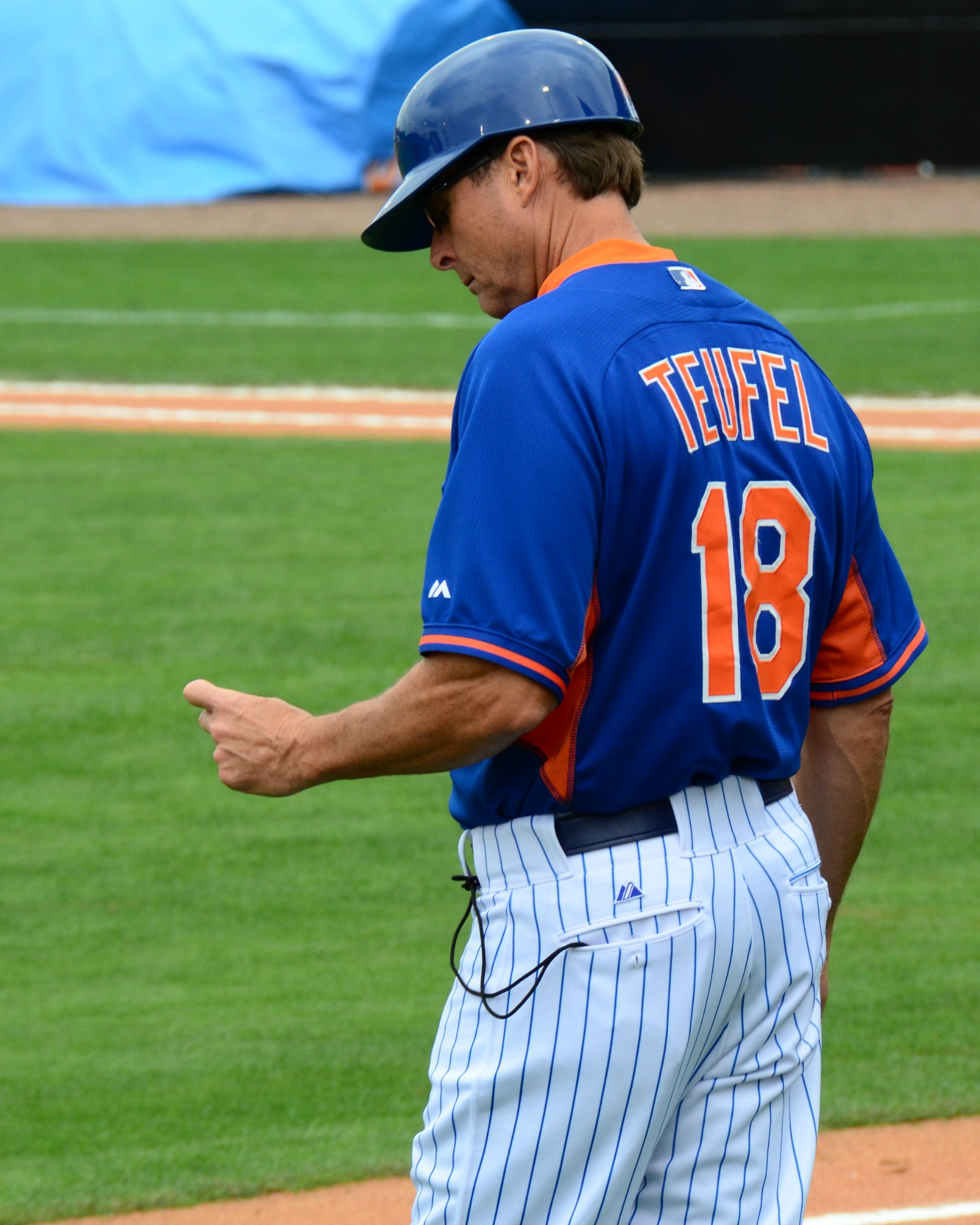
Teufel with the Mets in 2015

He was named manager of the Savannah Sand Gnats on January 11, 2007 and was a Mets representative at the 2008 Major League Baseball draft. He returned as St. Lucie's manager in 2008 and 2009. In 2010, in his first season managing the Double-A Binghamton Mets, he led the team to a 66–76 record and a fifth-place finish in the Eastern League. He was named manager of the Buffalo Bisons in January 2011. In 2011, he was named manager of Leones del Caracas in the Venezuelan Professional Baseball League. On November 16, 2011, he was replaced as manager by Carlos Lezcano.

Teufel returned to the New York Mets organization as the new third base coach in 2011, replacing former coach Chip Hale. Teufel had a successful stint for five years as the third base coach, participating in the 2015 World Series and was a part of winning the 2015 National League East title, their first division title since 2006, and first World Series appearance since 2000. He coached in the 2016 Major League Baseball All-Star Game in San Diego at Petco Park. After the 2016 season, it was announced that Teufel would be replaced by longtime Arizona Diamondbacks coach Glenn Sherlock. On November 25, 2016 it was announced that he would be the minor league instructor and club ambassador. Following the 2022 season, Teufel and the Mets parted ways from an employment standpoint but he remains connected to the organization for appearances and representing the organization.

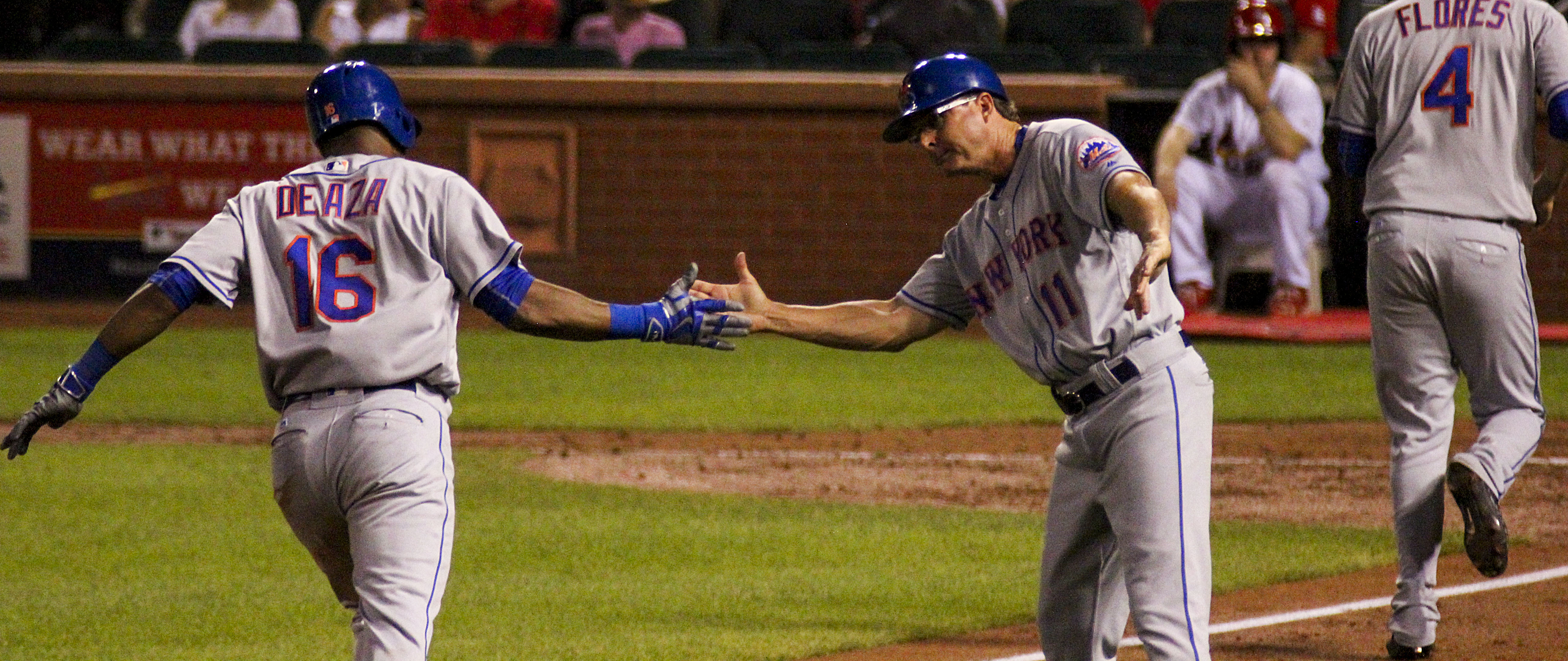
Teufel with the Mets in 2016.

== Career stats ==
Games	AB	Runs	Hits	2B	3B	HR	RBI	Avg.	SB	CS	BB	SO	HBP	Slg.	Fld%
1073	3112	415	789	185	12	86	379	.254	23	19	387	531	12	.404	.979
