= Rafael Santana =

Dominican baseball player (born 1958)

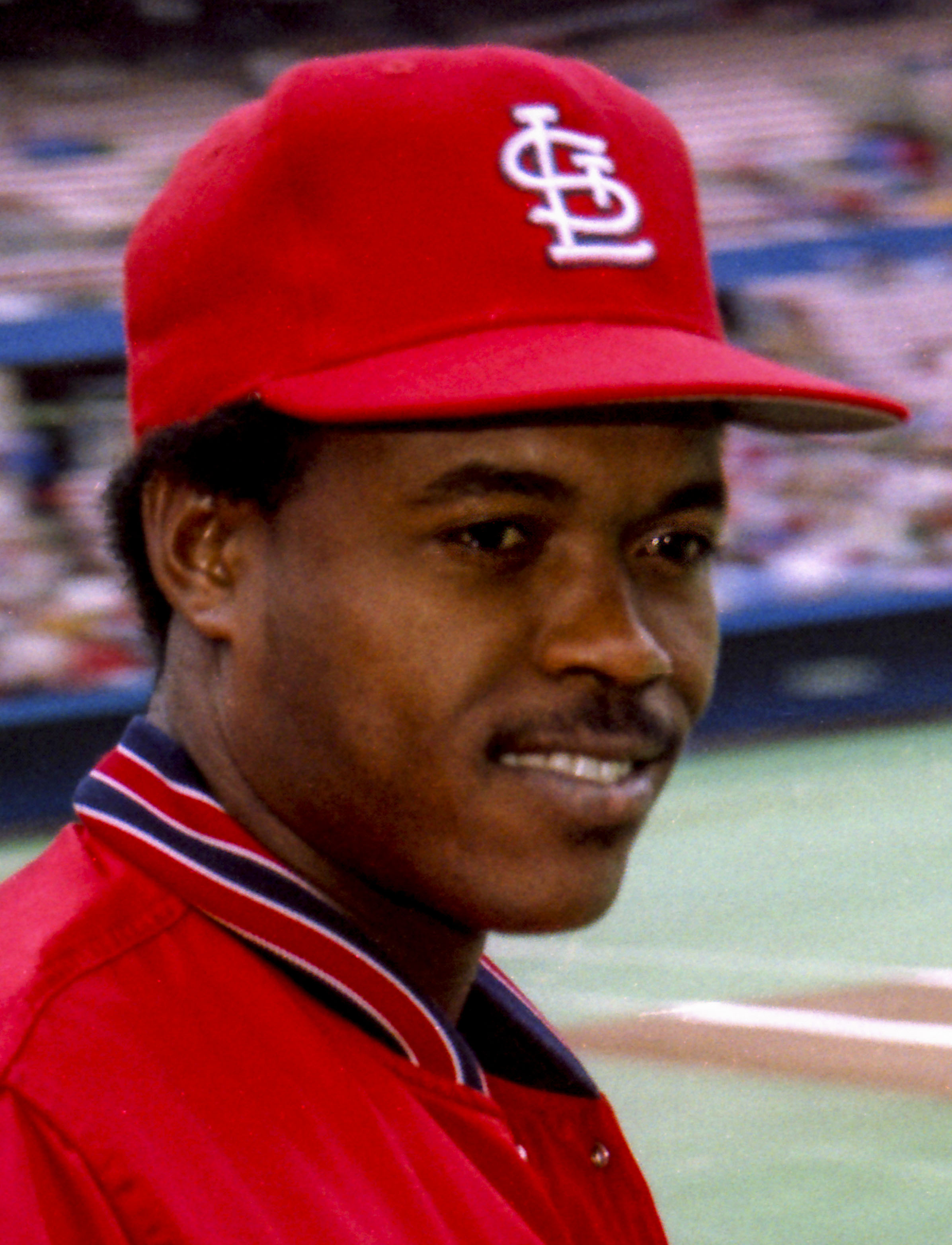

Chicago White Sox
- Shortstop
- Born: January 31, 1958 (age 68); La Romana, Dominican Republic
- Batted: Right Threw: Right

MLB debut
- April 5, 1983, for the St. Louis Cardinals

Last MLB appearance
- April 23, 1990, for the Cleveland Indians

MLB statistics
- Batting average: .246
- Home runs: 13
- Runs batted in: 156
- Stats at Baseball Reference

Teams
- St. Louis Cardinals (1983); New York Mets (1984–1987); New York Yankees (1988); Cleveland Indians (1990)

Career highlights and awards
- World Series champion (1986)

Rafael Francisco Santana de la Cruz (born January 31, 1958) is a Dominican former Major League Baseball shortstop who won a World Series ring with the 1986 New York Mets. He currently serves as the Dominican Republic scouting and player development supervisor for the Chicago White Sox.

== St. Louis Cardinals ==
Signed by the New York Yankees as an amateur free agent in 1976, Santana spent several years in their farm system before being traded to the St. Louis Cardinals on February 16, 1981 for a player to be named later. The Cardinals sent pitcher George Frazier to the Yankees in June to complete the deal.

Santana made the Cardinals out of spring training in 1983, making his major league debut on April 5 at third base in the season opener against the Pittsburgh Pirates. In 30 games, Santana had only three hits in fourteen at-bats for a .214 batting average to go along with two runs batted in.

== New York Mets ==
Santana was released by the Cardinals on January 17, 1984, and signed that same day with the New York Mets. During the 1984 season, he played 51 games for the Mets, hitting a career-best .271 with a home run and 12 RBIs as the primary back-up for starting shortstop Jose Oquendo.

Oquendo was traded with Mark J. Davis to the St. Louis Cardinals for Ángel Salazar and John Young during the offseason, making Santana the regular Mets shortstop for 1985. He responded with a .257 batting average and a .965 fielding percentage for the squad that finished with 98 wins, and three games behind the Cards in the National League East.

During the 1986 regular season, he batted just .218 with a home run and 28 RBIs, however, batting eighth in the order, he also led the squad with twelve intentional walks (Mets pitchers batted only .123 for the season). Santana started all 13 games for the Mets during the 1986 post-season, and established an NLCS record for most putouts (13), assists (18) and chances accepted (31) by a shortstop in a six-game series against the Houston Astros.

After the 1987 campaign where he set career-highs in home runs (5) and RBIs (44) with the Mets, Santana was traded to the cross-town Yankees with Victor Garcia for Steve Frey, Phil Lombardi and Darren Reed. He hit .240 with four home runs and 38 RBIs for managers Billy Martin and Lou Piniella in 1988. After missing the entire 1989 season with an elbow injury, Santana was released on November 7 of that year.

== Cleveland Indians ==
In January 1990, Santana signed with the Cleveland Indians, where he played 7 games and was reunited with 1986 Mets teammates Keith Hernandez, Jesse Orosco, and Stan Jefferson. After being released on April 25 of that year, he retired from the big leagues at the age of 32.

== Coaching career ==
After his playing career, Santana made a seamless foray into coaching. He started by managing Azucareros del Este of the Dominican Winter League from 1992 through 1993. His first coaching job in the United States was also in 1992, with the Kansas City Royals' Florida State League affiliate, the Baseball City Royals (located in Davenport, Florida). He spent four seasons in the Royals' organization, also coaching with the Carolina League's Wilmington Blue Rocks, the Northwest League's Eugene Emeralds and the Midwest League's Springfield Sultans.

After this, Santana worked three seasons in the Boston Red Sox organization, overseeing the Red Sox Dominican program in 1996 and as a roving infield instructor and hitting coach with the Class A New York–Penn League Lowell Spinners in 1997 and 1998 before moving on to the White Sox. He spent four seasons as the ChiSox's minor league infield instructor before being promoted to the major league club in the same capacity while also serving as their first base coach for 2003 and 2004. Santana returned to his previous position as roving infield instructor in 2005. On January 1, 2006, Rafael Santana was named manager of the Winston-Salem Warthogs, his first managerial job in the United States. The following season, Santana took over the Birmingham Barons from Chris Cron. He currently serves as the Dominican Republic scouting and player development supervisor for the White Sox.

== Personal life ==
He is a member of the Mets Alumni Association and along with past Mets players, still makes personal appearances on behalf of the team. On August 19, 2006, Santana attended a 20th Anniversary Reunion of the 1986 Mets World Series Championship Team at Shea Stadium in Flushing, New York, which took place prior to that night's game between the Mets and the Colorado Rockies.

Santana and his wife, Gloria, live in Cape Coral, Florida, and have three children: Audry, Alexander, and Dhayan. Alexander is a third baseman who attended Mariner High School in the Cape and was drafted by the Los Angeles Dodgers in the 2nd round of the 2011 MLB draft.
