= Steve Crawford (baseball) =

American baseball player (born 1958)

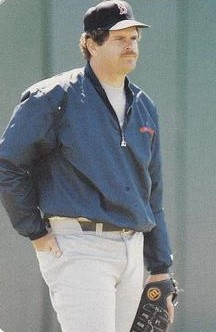
- Pitcher
- Born: April 29, 1958 (age 68); Pryor, Oklahoma, U.S.
- Batted: Right Threw: Right

MLB debut
- September 2, 1980, for the Boston Red Sox

Last MLB appearance
- October 5, 1991, for the Kansas City Royals

MLB statistics
- Win–loss record: 30–23
- Earned run average: 4.17
- Strikeouts: 320
- Stats at Baseball Reference

Teams
- Boston Red Sox (1980–1982, 1984–1987); Kansas City Royals (1989–1991)

Steven Ray Crawford (born April 29, 1958) is an American former pitcher in Major League Baseball who played for two teams from 1980 through 1991. Listed at 6 feet 5 inches (196 cm), 225 pounds (102 kg) he batted and threw right-handed. Crawford started his professional career with Winston-Salem in the Class-A Carolina League. He pitched in 19 games, started 14, and sported a 9–5 record with a 3.44 ERA. One of his teammates, Michael Moore, called Crawford “Shag” because of his bushy long hair and mustache, and the nickname stuck.

A versatile hard-thrower, Crawford filled various relief roles coming out from the bullpen, as a closer or middle reliever, serving as an emergency starter as well. He reached the majors in 1980 with the Boston Red Sox, spending seven years with them before moving to the Kansas City Royals (1989–91). His most productive season came in 1985 with the Red Sox, when he set career-highs in wins (6), saves (12), strikeouts (58) and innings pitched (91.0). During the 1986 postseason, he went 2–0, including a win in Game 2 of the World Series; he did this despite going winless during the 1986 regular season. He also had three decent years with Kansas City, winning 11 games and averaging 60.0 innings of work in each season. On August 10, 1990, he notched his one and only save as a Royal during the second game of a Brewers vs Royals doubleheader. Crawford threw four scoreless innings to close out a 9–4 Royals victory.

In a ten-season career, Crawford posted a 30–23 record with 19 saves and a 4.17 earned run average in 277 games, including 16 starts, two complete games and 562 2/3 innings.
