= 1988 Texas Rangers season =

1988 Texas Rangers
- League: American League
- Division: West
- Ballpark: Arlington Stadium
- City: Arlington, Texas
- Record: 70–91 (.435)
- Divisional place: 6th
- Owners: Eddie Chiles
- General managers: Tom Grieve
- Managers: Bobby Valentine
- Television: KTVT (Bob Carpenter, Steve Busby); HSE (Bob Carpenter, Norm Hitzges, Merle Harmon)
- Radio: WBAP (Eric Nadel, Mark Holtz )

The 1988 Texas Rangers season was the 28th of the Texas Rangers franchise overall, their 17th in Arlington as the Rangers, and the 17th season at Arlington Stadium. The Rangers finished sixth in the American League West with a record of 70 wins and 91 losses.

== Offseason ==
- December 13, 1987: Bárbaro Garbey was signed as a free agent with the Texas Rangers.
- December 21, 1987: Greg A. Harris was released by the Texas Rangers.
- March 25, 1988: Mike Loynd was traded by the Rangers to the Houston Astros for Robbie Wine.

== Regular season ==
=== Opening Day starters ===
- Jerry Browne
- Steve Buechele
- Scott Fletcher
- Charlie Hough
- Pete Incaviglia
- Oddibe McDowell
- Pete O'Brien
- Larry Parrish
- Geno Petralli
- Rubén Sierra

=== Season standings ===
AL West
Team	W	L	Pct.	GB	Home	Road
Oakland Athletics	104	58	.642	—	54‍–‍27	50‍–‍31
Minnesota Twins	91	71	.562	13	47‍–‍34	44‍–‍37
Kansas City Royals	84	77	.522	19½	44‍–‍36	40‍–‍41
California Angels	75	87	.463	29	35‍–‍46	40‍–‍41
Chicago White Sox	71	90	.441	32½	40‍–‍41	31‍–‍49
Texas Rangers	70	91	.435	33½	38‍–‍43	32‍–‍48
Seattle Mariners	68	93	.422	35½	37‍–‍44	31‍–‍49

=== Record vs. opponents ===
1988 American League record Sources:
Team	BAL	BOS	CAL	CWS	CLE	DET	KC	MIL	MIN	NYY	OAK	SEA	TEX	TOR
Baltimore	—	4–9	5–7	4–7	4–9	5–8	0–12	4–9	3–9	3–10	4–8	7–5	6–6	5–8
Boston	9–4	—	8–4	7–5	8–5	6–7	6–6	10–3	7–5	9–4	3–9	6–6	8–4	2–11
California	7–5	4–8	—	9–4	8–4	5–7	5–8	3–9	4–9	6–6	4–9	6–7	8–5	6–6
Chicago	7–4	5–7	4–9	—	3–9	3–9	7–6	6–6	4–9	3–9	5–8	9–4	8–5	7–5
Cleveland	9–4	5–8	4–8	9–3	—	4–9	6–6	9–4	5–7	6–7	4–8	5–7	6–6	6–7
Detroit	8–5	7–6	7–5	9–3	9–4	—	8–4	5–8	1–11	8–5	4–8	9–3	8–4	5–8
Kansas City	12–0	6–6	8–5	6–7	6–6	4–8	—	3–9	7–6	6–6	8–5	7–5	7–6	4–8
Milwaukee	9–4	3–10	9–3	6–6	4–9	8–5	9–3	—	7–5	6–7	3–9	8–4	8–4	7–6
Minnesota	9–3	5–7	9–4	9–4	7–5	11–1	6–7	5–7	—	3–9	5–8	8–5	7–6	7–5
New York	10–3	4–9	6–6	9–3	7–6	5–8	6–6	7–6	9–3	—	6–6	5–7	5–6	6–7
Oakland	8–4	9–3	9–4	8–5	8–4	8–4	5–8	9–3	8–5	6–6	—	9–4	8–5	9–3
Seattle	5–7	6–6	7–6	4–9	7–5	3–9	5–7	4–8	5–8	7–5	4–9	—	6–7	5–7
Texas	6–6	4–8	5–8	5–8	6–6	4–8	6–7	4–8	6–7	6–5	5–8	7–6	—	6–6
Toronto	8–5	11–2	6–6	5–7	7–6	8–5	8–4	6–7	5–7	7–6	3–9	7–5	6–6	—

=== Detailed records ===
American League
Opponent	Total	Home	Away	RS	RA
American League West
California Angels	5–8	3–4	2–4	45	50
Chicago White Sox	5–8	2–4	3–4	63	62
Kansas City Royals	6–7	4–3	2–4	65	83
Minnesota Twins	6–7	2–4	4–3	48	70
Oakland Athletics	5–8	3–4	2–4	52	64
Seattle Mariners	7–6	3–3	4–2	52	42
Texas Rangers	–	–	–	–	–
Total	34–44	17–22	17–22	325	371
American League East
Baltimore Orioles	6–6	4–2	2–4	59	49
Boston Red Sox	4–8	2–4	2–4	37	60
Cleveland Indians	6–6	3–3	3–3	43	39
Detroit Tigers	4–8	2–4	2–4	30	38
Milwaukee Brewers	4–8	2–4	2–4	37	50
New York Yankees	6–5	4–2	2–3	47	63
Toronto Blue Jays	6–6	4–2	2–4	59	65
Total	36–47	21–21	15–26	312	364

=== Notable transactions ===
- April 4, 1988: Guy Hoffman was signed as a free agent by the Rangers.
- July 21, 1988: Jim Sundberg was signed as a free agent by the Rangers.
- July 27, 1988: Iván Rodríguez was signed by the Rangers as an amateur free agent.
- August 30, 1988: Dale Mohorcic was traded by the Rangers to the New York Yankees for Cecilio Guante.
- September 1, 1988: Tom O'Malley was traded by the Rangers to the Montreal Expos for a player to be named later. The Expos completed the deal by sending Jack Daugherty to the Rangers on September 13.

=== Roster ===
1988 Texas Rangers roster
Roster
Pitchers: 41 Kevin Brown; 37 José Cecena; 46 Tony Fossas; 51 Cecilio Guante; 23 José Guzmán; 32 Ray Hayward; 45 Dwayne Henry; 42 Guy Hoffman; 49 Charlie Hough; 30 Mike Jeffcoat; 39 Paul Kilgus; 48 Scott May; 38 Craig McMurtry; 34 Dale Mohorcic; 40 Jeff Russell; 43 Ed Vande Berg; 54 DeWayne Vaughn; 28 Mitch Williams; 34 Steve Wilson; 36 Bobby Witt	Catchers: 7 Chad Kreuter; 12 Geno Petralli; 13 Larry See; 5 Mike Stanley; 10 Jim Sundberg; Infielders: 8 Jerry Browne; 22 Steve Buechele; 1 Scott Fletcher; 20 Jeff Kunkel; 9 Pete O'Brien; 19 Curtis Wilkerson	Outfielders: 33 Bob Brower; 6 Cecil Espy; 17 Bárbaro Garbey; 29 Pete Incaviglia; 24 Steve Kemp; 0 Oddibe McDowell; 47 Kevin Reimer; 21 Rubén Sierra; 27 Jim Steels; Other batters: 15 Larry Parrish	Manager: 2 Bobby Valentine; Coaches: 52 Dick Egan; 35 Tom House; 10 Art Howe; 14 Davey Lopes; 26 Dave Oliver; 31 Tom Robson

== Game log ==
1988 Game Log 70–91 (Home: 38–43; Away: 32–48)
April: 8–13 (Home: 4–7; Away: 4–6)

#	Date	Opponent	Score	Win	Loss	Save	Record	Streak
1	April 4	Indians	4–3				1–0	W1
2	April 6	Indians	1–5				1–1	L1
3	April 7	Indians	1–4				1–2	L2
4	April 8	Red Sox	0–4				1–3	L3
5	April 9	Red Sox	1–2				1–4	L4
6	April 10	Red Sox	4–1				2–4	W1
7	April 12	@ Tigers	1–4				2–5	L1
8	April 14	@ Tigers	2–1				3–5	W1
9	April 15	@ Red Sox	3–2 (10)				4–5	W2
10	April 16	@ Red Sox	2–0				5–5	W3
11	April 17	@ Red Sox	2–15				5–6	L1
12	April 18	@ Red Sox	3–4				5–7	L2
13	April 19	@ Indians	3–0				6–7	W1
14	April 20	@ Indians	1–2				6–8	L1
15	April 22	Tigers	3–5				6–9	L2
16	April 23	Tigers	6–7				6–10	L3
17	April 24	Tigers	4–2				7–10	W1
18	April 26	Brewers	3–1				8–10	W2
19	April 27	Brewers	3–4				8–11	L1
20	April 29	@ Yankees	1–2				8–12	L2
21	April 30	@ Yankees	3–15				8–13	L3

May: 17–11 (Home: 11–5; Away: 6–6)

#	Date	Opponent	Score	Win	Loss	Save	Record	Streak
22	May 1	@ Yankees	5–1				9–13	W1
23	May 2	@ Orioles	4–9				9–14	L1
24	May 3	@ Orioles	4–2				10–14	W1
25	May 4	@ Brewers	5–6				10–15	L1
26	May 5	@ Brewers	1–9				10–16	L2
27	May 6	Yankees	7–6				11–16	W1
28	May 7	Yankees	3–2				12–16	W2
29	May 8	Yankees	10–8				13–16	W3
30	May 10	Orioles	13–5				14–16	W4
31	May 11	Orioles	8–0				15–16	W5
32	May 12	Orioles	2–1				16–16	W6
33	May 13	Royals	2–1				17–16	W7
34	May 14	Royals	6–3				18–16	W8
35	May 15	Royals	4–5				18–17	L1
36	May 16	Royals	6–7				18–18	L2
37	May 17	@ Blue Jays	7–6 (14)				19–18	W1
38	May 18	@ Blue Jays	4–0				20–18	W2
-	May 20	Twins	Postponed (rain); Makeup: May 22				20–18	-
39	May 21	Twins	3–0				21–18	W3
40	May 22	Twins	5–15				21–19	L1
41	May 22	Twins	2–4				21–20	L2
42	May 24	Blue Jays	2–13				21–21	L3
43	May 25	Blue Jays	5–1				22–21	W1
44	May 26	Blue Jays	8–7				23–21	W2
45	May 27	@ Royals	3–2				24–21	W3
46	May 28	@ Royals	6–8				24–22	L1
47	May 29	@ Royals	1–12				24–23	L2
48	May 30	@ Twins	6–1				25–23	W1
49	May 31	@ Twins	6–8				25–24	L1

June: 12–15 (Home: 4–7; Away: 6–8)

#	Date	Opponent	Score	Win	Loss	Save	Record	Streak
50	June 1	@ Twins	1–7				25–25	L2
51	June 2	@ White Sox	10–2				26–25	W1
52	June 3	@ White Sox	9–3				27–25	W2
53	June 4	@ White Sox	8–10				27–26	L1
54	June 5	@ White Sox	4–5				27–27	L2
55	June 6	Angels	6–4				28–27	W1
56	June 7	Angels	0–1				28–28	L1
57	June 8	Angels	2–5				28–29	L2
58	June 9	Athletics	5–2				29–29	W1
59	June 10	Athletics	6–7				29–30	L1
60	June 11	Athletics	4–13				29–31	L2
61	June 12	Athletics	3–2				30–31	W1
62	June 14	@ Angels	0–3				30–32	L1
63	June 15	@ Angels	6–3 (10)				31–32	W1
64	June 16	@ Angels	0–3				31–33	L1
65	June 17	@ Athletics	6–7 (14)				31–34	L2
66	June 18	@ Athletics	1–2 (13)				31–35	L3
67	June 19	@ Athletics	5–4 (11)				32–35	W1
68	June 20	Mariners	4–3				33–35	W2
69	June 21	Mariners	6–0				34–35	W3
70	June 22	Mariners	2–3 (10)				34–36	L1
71	June 24	White Sox	5–2				35–36	W1
72	June 25	White Sox	5–10				35–37	L1
73	June 26	White Sox	5–7				35–38	L2
74	June 27	@ Mariners	3–6				35–39	L3
75	June 28	@ Mariners	6–0				36–39	W1
76	June 29	@ Mariners	1–0 (12)				37–39	W2

July: 9–18 (Home: 4–9; Away: 5–9)

#	Date	Opponent	Score	Win	Loss	Save	Record	Streak
77	July 1	Orioles	1–7				37–40	L1
78	July 2	Orioles	4–7				37–41	L2
79	July 3	Orioles	13–1				38–41	W1
80	July 4	Yankees	2–13				38–42	L1
81	July 5	Yankees	3–5				38–43	L2
82	July 6	Yankees	4–2				39–43	W1
83	July 7	@ Orioles	0–6				39–44	L1
84	July 8	@ Orioles	8–5				40–44	W1
85	July 9	@ Orioles	1–4				40–45	L1
86	July 10	@ Orioles	1–2				40–46	L2
87	July 14	Brewers	2–6				40–47	L3
88	July 15	Brewers	2–4				40–48	L4
89	July 16	Brewers	3–4				40–49	L5
90	July 17	Brewers	3–0				41–49	W1
91	July 18	@ Yankees	2–7				41–50	L1
92	July 19	@ Yankees	7–2				42–51	W1
-	July 20	@ Yankees	Cancelled (rain)				42–51	-
93	July 21	@ Brewers	1–6				42–51	L1
94	July 22	@ Brewers	1–2				42–52	L2
95	July 23	@ Brewers	7–4				43–52	W1
96	July 24	@ Brewers	6–4				44–52	W2
97	July 25	Red Sox	0–2				44–53	L1
98	July 26	Red Sox	9–8				45–53	W1
99	July 27	Red Sox	7–10				45–54	L1
100	July 29	@ Tigers	2–3				45–55	L2
101	July 29	@ Tigers	2–1				46–55	W1
102	July 30	@ Tigers	0–3				46–56	L1
103	July 31	@ Tigers	1–5				46–57	L2

August: 14–14 (Home: 8–7; Away: 6–7)

#	Date	Opponent	Score	Win	Loss	Save	Record	Streak
104	August 2	@ Red Sox	2–7				46–58	L3
105	August 3	@ Red Sox	4–5				47–59	L4
106	August 5	Indians	8–4				47–59	W1
107	August 6	Indians	3–5				47–60	L1
108	August 7	Indians	2–0				48–60	W1
109	August 8	Tigers	2–3				48–61	L1
110	August 9	Tigers	6–2				49–61	W1
111	August 10	Tigers	1–2				49–62	L1
112	August 11	@ Indians	5–4				50–62	W1
113	August 12	@ Indians	3–6				50–63	L1
114	August 13	@ Indians	12–3				51–63	W1
115	August 14	@ Indians	0–3				51–64	L1
116	August 15	@ Royals	3–12				51–65	L2
117	August 16	@ Royals	5–4				52–65	W1
118	August 17	@ Royals	6–9				52–66	L1
119	August 18	@ Twins	4–2				53–66	W1
120	August 19	@ Twins	5–0				54–66	W2
121	August 20	@ Twins	3–2				55–66	W3
122	August 21	@ Twins	2–12				55–67	L1
123	August 22	Royals	9–5				56–67	W1
124	August 23	Royals	7–11				56–68	L1
125	August 24	Royals	7–4				57–68	W1
126	August 26	Blue Jays	5–1				58–68	W2
127	August 27	Blue Jays	5–3				59–68	W3
128	August 28	Blue Jays	5–6 (11)				59–69	L1
129	August 29	Twins	2–3				59–70	L2
130	August 30	Twins	8–6				60–70	W1
131	August 31	Twins	1–10				60–71	L1

September: 9–17 (Home: 5–8; Away: 4–9)

#	Date	Opponent	Score	Win	Loss	Save	Record	Streak
132	September 1	@ Blue Jays	1–5				60–72	L2
133	September 2	@ Blue Jays	6–7				60–73	L3
134	September 3	@ Blue Jays	4–7				60–74	L4
135	September 4	@ Blue Jays	7–9				60–75	L5
136	September 5	Athletics	4–11				60–76	L6
137	September 6	Athletics	3–1				61–76	W1
138	September 7	Athletics	3–6				61–77	L1
139	September 8	Angels	3–4				61–78	L2
140	September 9	Angels	3–5				61–79	L3
141	September 10	Angels	3–2 (17)				62–79	W1
142	September 11	Angels	8–3				63–79	W2
143	September 13	@ Athletics	1–2				63–80	L1
144	September 14	@ Athletics	9–1				64–80	W1
145	September 15	@ Athletics	2–6				64–81	L1
146	September 16	@ Angels	2–7				64–82	L2
147	September 17	@ Angels	7–4				65–82	W1
148	September 18	@ Angels	5–6				65–83	L1
149	September 19	White Sox	3–7				65–84	L2
150	September 20	White Sox	4–1				66–84	W1
151	September 21	White Sox	1–6				66–85	L1
152	September 23	Mariners	3–2 (10)				67–85	W1
153	September 24	Mariners	0–3				67–86	L1
154	September 25	Mariners	5–8				67–87	L2
155	September 26	@ White Sox	5–3				68–87	W1
156	September 27	@ White Sox	2–3				68–88	L1
157	September 28	@ White Sox	2–3				68–89	L2
158	September 29	@ Mariners	1–5				68–90	L3
159	September 30	@ Mariners	11–6				69–90	W1

October: 1–1 (Home: 0–0; Away: 1–1)

#	Date	Opponent	Score	Win	Loss	Save	Record	Streak
160	October 1	@ Mariners	3–4 (11)				70–90	L1
161	October 2	@ Mariners	7–2				71–90	W1

Legend: = Win = Loss = Postponement
Bold = Rangers team member

== Player stats ==
=== Batting ===
==== Starters by position ====
Note: Pos = Position; G = Games played; AB = At bats; H = Hits; Avg. = Batting average; HR = Home runs; RBI = Runs batted in

Pos	Player	G	AB	H	Avg.	HR	RBI
C	Geno Petralli	129	351	99	.282	7	36
1B	Pete O'Brien	156	547	149	.272	16	71
2B	Curt Wilkerson	117	338	99	.293	0	28
SS	Scott Fletcher	140	515	142	.276	0	47
3B	Steve Buechele	155	503	126	.250	16	58
LF	Pete Incaviglia	116	418	104	.249	22	54
CF	Oddibe McDowell	120	437	108	.247	6	37
RF	Rubén Sierra	156	615	156	.254	23	91
DH	Larry Parrish	68	248	47	.190	7	26

==== Other batters ====
Note: G = Games played; AB = At bats; H = Hits; Avg. = Batting average; HR = Home runs; RBI = Runs batted in

Player	G	AB	H	Avg.	HR	RBI
Cecil Espy	123	347	86	.248	2	39
Mike Stanley	94	249	57	.229	3	27
Jerry Browne	73	214	49	.229	1	17
Bob Brower	82	201	45	.224	1	11
Jeff Kunkel	55	154	35	.227	2	15
Jim Sundberg	38	91	26	.286	4	13
Barbaro Garbey	30	62	12	.194	0	5
Jim Steels	36	53	10	.189	0	5
Chad Kreuter	16	51	14	.275	1	5
Steve Kemp	16	36	8	.222	0	2
Kevin Reimer	12	25	3	.120	1	2
Larry See	13	23	3	.130	0	0

=== Pitching ===
==== Starting pitchers ====
Note: G = Games pitched; IP = Innings pitched; W = Wins; L = Losses; ERA = Earned run average; SO = Strikeouts

Player	G	IP	W	L	ERA	SO
Charlie Hough	34	252.0	15	16	3.32	174
José Guzmán	30	206.2	11	13	3.70	157
Paul Kilgus	32	203.1	12	15	4.16	88
Jeff Russell	34	188.2	10	9	3.82	88
Bobby Witt	22	174.1	8	10	3.92	148
Ray Hayward	12	62.2	4	6	5.46	37
Kevin Brown	4	23.1	1	1	4.24	12

==== Other pitchers ====
Note: G = Games pitched; IP = Innings pitched; W = Wins; L = Losses; ERA = Earned run average; SO = Strikeouts

Player	G	IP	W	L	ERA	SO
Mike Jeffcoat	5	10.0	0	2	11.70	5
Scott May	3	7.1	0	0	8.59	4

==== Relief pitchers ====
Note: G = Games pitched; W = Wins; L = Losses; SV = Saves; ERA = Earned run average; SO = Strikeouts

Player	G	W	L	SV	ERA	SO
Mitch Williams	67	2	7	18	4.63	61
Dale Mohorcic	43	2	6	5	4.85	25
Craig McMurtry	32	3	3	3	2.25	35
Ed Vande Berg	26	2	2	2	4.14	18
José Cecena	22	0	0	1	8.71	10
Guy Hoffman	11	0	0	0	5.24	9
Dwayne Henry	11	0	0	1	8.71	10
DeWayne Vaughn	8	0	0	0	7.63	8
Cecilio Guante	7	0	0	1	1.93	4
Tony Fossas	5	0	0	0	4.76	0
Steve Wilson	3	0	0	0	5.87	1
Jeff Kunkel	1	0	0	0	0.00	1

== Farm system ==
Level	Team	League	Manager
AAA	Oklahoma City 89ers	American Association	Toby Harrah
AA	Tulsa Drillers	Texas League	Jim Skaalen
A	Charlotte Rangers	Florida State League	Bobby Jones
A	Gastonia Rangers	South Atlantic League	Orlando Gómez
Rookie	GCL Rangers	Gulf Coast League	Chino Cadahia
Rookie	Butte Copper Kings	Pioneer League	Bump Wills

LEAGUE CHAMPIONS: Tulsa
