= 1988 Toronto Blue Jays season =

1988 Toronto Blue Jays
- League: American League
- Division: East
- Ballpark: Exhibition Stadium
- City: Toronto
- Record: 87–75 (.537)
- Divisional place: 4th
- Owners: Labatt Breweries, Imperial Trust, Canadian Imperial Bank of Commerce
- General managers: Pat Gillick
- Managers: Jimy Williams
- Television: CFTO-TV (Don Chevrier, Tony Kubek, Fergie Olver); The Sports Network (Fergie Olver, Buck Martinez)
- Radio: CJCL (AM) (Jerry Howarth, Tom Cheek)

The 1988 Toronto Blue Jays season was the franchise's 12th season of Major League Baseball. It resulted in the Blue Jays finishing in fourth (tie-breaker went to Milwaukee) in the American League East with a record of 87 wins and 75 losses. This was their last full season at Exhibition Stadium before moving to their new home in June of the following year.

== Transactions ==
Transactions by the Toronto Blue Jays during the off-season before the 1988 season.

=== October 1987 ===
October 6	Player rights to Tom Filer sold to the Milwaukee Brewers.
October 15	Odell Jones granted free agency. José Segura granted free agency.
October 23	Released Charlie Moore.

=== November 1987 ===
November 9	Garth Iorg granted free agency.
November 22	Craig McMurtry granted free agency.

=== December 1987 ===
December 7	Joe Johnson drafted by the California Angels in the 1987 MLB Rule 5 draft.

=== January 1988 ===
January 22	Juan Beníquez granted free agency.
January 25	Re-signed free agent Juan Beníquez to a one-year, $400,000 contract.
January 26	Signed amateur free agent Graeme Lloyd to a contract.

=== February 1988 ===
February 22	Signed free agent Mark Ross from the Pittsburgh Pirates to a contract.

=== March 1988 ===
March 24	Signed free agent Sal Butera from the Minnesota Twins to a one-year, $100,000 contract.
March 25	Player rights of Willie Upshaw sold to the Cleveland Indians.

== Regular season ==
- April 4, 1988: George Bell set a major league record for the most home runs hit on Opening Day, with three. Bell accomplished this in a game versus the Kansas City Royals.
- September 24 and 30, 1988: Dave Stieb had two consecutive no-hitters broken up in the ninth inning with two outs and two strikes.

=== Season standings ===
AL East
Team	W	L	Pct.	GB	Home	Road
Boston Red Sox	89	73	.549	—	53‍–‍28	36‍–‍45
Detroit Tigers	88	74	.543	1	50‍–‍31	38‍–‍43
Milwaukee Brewers	87	75	.537	2	47‍–‍34	40‍–‍41
Toronto Blue Jays	87	75	.537	2	45‍–‍36	42‍–‍39
New York Yankees	85	76	.528	3½	46‍–‍34	39‍–‍42
Cleveland Indians	78	84	.481	11	44‍–‍37	34‍–‍47
Baltimore Orioles	54	107	.335	34½	34‍–‍46	20‍–‍61

=== Record vs. opponents ===
1988 American League record Sources:
Team	BAL	BOS	CAL	CWS	CLE	DET	KC	MIL	MIN	NYY	OAK	SEA	TEX	TOR
Baltimore	—	4–9	5–7	4–7	4–9	5–8	0–12	4–9	3–9	3–10	4–8	7–5	6–6	5–8
Boston	9–4	—	8–4	7–5	8–5	6–7	6–6	10–3	7–5	9–4	3–9	6–6	8–4	2–11
California	7–5	4–8	—	9–4	8–4	5–7	5–8	3–9	4–9	6–6	4–9	6–7	8–5	6–6
Chicago	7–4	5–7	4–9	—	3–9	3–9	7–6	6–6	4–9	3–9	5–8	9–4	8–5	7–5
Cleveland	9–4	5–8	4–8	9–3	—	4–9	6–6	9–4	5–7	6–7	4–8	5–7	6–6	6–7
Detroit	8–5	7–6	7–5	9–3	9–4	—	8–4	5–8	1–11	8–5	4–8	9–3	8–4	5–8
Kansas City	12–0	6–6	8–5	6–7	6–6	4–8	—	3–9	7–6	6–6	8–5	7–5	7–6	4–8
Milwaukee	9–4	3–10	9–3	6–6	4–9	8–5	9–3	—	7–5	6–7	3–9	8–4	8–4	7–6
Minnesota	9–3	5–7	9–4	9–4	7–5	11–1	6–7	5–7	—	3–9	5–8	8–5	7–6	7–5
New York	10–3	4–9	6–6	9–3	7–6	5–8	6–6	7–6	9–3	—	6–6	5–7	5–6	6–7
Oakland	8–4	9–3	9–4	8–5	8–4	8–4	5–8	9–3	8–5	6–6	—	9–4	8–5	9–3
Seattle	5–7	6–6	7–6	4–9	7–5	3–9	5–7	4–8	5–8	7–5	4–9	—	6–7	5–7
Texas	6–6	4–8	5–8	5–8	6–6	4–8	6–7	4–8	6–7	6–5	5–8	7–6	—	6–6
Toronto	8–5	11–2	6–6	5–7	7–6	8–5	8–4	6–7	5–7	7–6	3–9	7–5	6–6	—

=== Transactions ===
Transactions for the Toronto Blue Jays during the 1988 regular season.

==== April 1988 ====
April 7	Signed free agent Doug Bair from the Philadelphia Phillies to a contract. Signed free agent Frank Wills from the Cleveland Indians to a contract.

==== May 1988 ====
May 31	Released Juan Beníquez.

=== 1988 Draft ===
- June 1, 1988: David Weathers was drafted by the Toronto Blue Jays in the 3rd round of the 1988 amateur draft. Player signed June 4, 1988.

=== Roster ===
1988 Toronto Blue Jays
Roster
Pitchers: 40 Doug Bair; 27 Tony Castillo; 55 John Cerutti; 18 Jim Clancy; 38 Mark Eichhorn; 46 Mike Flanagan; 50 Tom Henke; 22 Jimmy Key; 13 Jeff Musselman; 45 José Núñez; 21 Mark Ross; 37 Dave Stieb; 16 Todd Stottlemyre; 31 Duane Ward; 36 David Wells; 44 Frank Wills	Catchers: 10 Pat Borders; 26 Sal Butera; 12 Ernie Whitt; Infielders: 1 Tony Fernández; 17 Kelly Gruber; 14 Alexis Infante; 4 Manuel Lee; 2 Nelson Liriano; 19 Fred McGriff	Outfielders: 29 Jesse Barfield; 11 George Bell; 6 Sil Campusano; 20 Rob Ducey; 9 Rick Leach; 15 Lloyd Moseby; 28 Lou Thornton; Other batters: 21 Juan Beníquez; 23 Cecil Fielder; 5 Rance Mulliniks	Manager: 3 Jimy Williams; Coaches: 54 Galen Cisco (assistant pitching); 43 Cito Gaston (hitting); 57 Winston Llenas (bench); 24 John McLaren (third base); 42 Billy Smith (first base); 8 John Sullivan (bullpen); 41 Al Widmar (pitching)

=== Game log ===
1988 Game Log
April: 9–13 (Home: 4–9; Away: 5–4)

#	Date	Opponent	Score	Win	Loss	Save	Attendance	Record
1	April 4	@ Royals	5–3	Key (1–0)	Saberhagen (0–1)	Henke (1)	40,648	1–0
2	April 6	@ Royals	11–4	Flanagan (1–0)	Leibrandt (0–1)		18,938	2–0
3	April 7	@ Royals	7–4	Gubicza (1–0)	Clancy (0–1)		29,070	2–1
4	April 8	@ Twins	6–3	Blyleven (1–0)	Stieb (0–1)	Reardon (1)	53,067	2–2
5	April 9	@ Twins	10–0	Key (2–0)	Lea (0–1)	Ward (1)	49,451	3–2
6	April 10	@ Twins	4–2	Viola (1–1)	Stottlemyre (0–1)	Reardon (2)	40,086	3–3
7	April 11	Yankees	17–9	Wells (1–0)	Rhoden (1–1)		45,185	4–3
8	April 12	Yankees	12–3	Candelaria (1–0)	Clancy (0–2)		24,116	4–4
9	April 13	Yankees	5–1	Dotson (2–0)	Stieb (0–2)		24,105	4–5
10	April 14	Yankees	7–3	Leiter (2–0)	Key (2–1)		24,524	4–6
--	April 15	Twins	Postponed (cold weather) Rescheduled for August 4					
11	April 16	Twins	3–2	Berenguer (1–2)	Wells (1–1)	Reardon (4)	26,095	4–7
12	April 17	Twins	2–0	Flanagan (2–0)	Straker (0–1)	Henke (2)	37,532	5–7
13	April 19	Royals	12–3	Clancy (1–2)	Saberhagen (1–2)		21,231	6–7
14	April 20	Royals	3–0	Stieb (1–2)	Leibrandt (1–3)	Henke (3)	20,202	7–7
15	April 22	@ Yankees	6–4 (12)	Wells (2–1)	Stoddard (1–1)	Henke (4)	33,314	8–7
16	April 23	@ Yankees	3–2	Cerutti (1–0)	Candelaria (1–2)	Henke (5)	24,046	9–7
17	April 24	@ Yankees	5–3	Hudson (2–0)	Eichhorn (0–1)		52,073	9–8
18	April 26	Athletics	6–1	Davis (2–1)	Stieb (1–3)	Eckersley (9)	21,280	9–9
19	April 27	Athletics	5–3	Young (1–0)	Flanagan (2–1)	Honeycutt (2)	20,236	9–10
20	April 28	Athletics	6–2	Stewart (6–0)	Stottlemyre (0–2)	Honeycutt (3)	21,178	9–11
21	April 29	Angels	9–5	Harvey (1–0)	Wells (2–2)		23,483	9–12
22	April 30	Angels	6–1	Finley (2–3)	Cerutti (1–1)		29,091	9–13

May: 13–16 (Home: 6–5; Away: 7–11)

#	Date	Opponent	Score	Win	Loss	Save	Attendance	Record
23	May 1	Angels	6–4	Stieb (2–3)	Witt (1–3)	Henke (6)	36,115	10–13
24	May 2	@ Mariners	7–5	Trout (3–2)	Flanagan (2–2)	Solano (2)	13,197	10–14
25	May 3	@ Mariners	9–2	Stottlemyre (1–2)	Campbell (2–3)	Ward (2)	9,970	11–14
26	May 4	@ Athletics	3–2	Welch (4–2)	Clancy (1–3)	Eckersley (11)	21,401	11–15
27	May 5	@ Athletics	8–5	Plunk (3–1)	Núñez (0–1)		16,998	11–16
28	May 6	@ Angels	3–2	Stieb (3–3)	Witt (1–4)	Henke (7)	29,237	12–16
29	May 7	@ Angels	9–4	Flanagan (3–2)	Fraser (3–2)	Wells (1)	32,630	13–16
30	May 8	@ Angels	8–1	McCaskill (2–3)	Stottlemyre (1–3)		29,026	13–17
31	May 10	Mariners	4–2	Langston (3–3)	Clancy (1–4)		28,290	13–18
32	May 11	Mariners	9–3	Stieb (4–3)	Moore (2–4)		27,575	14–18
33	May 12	Mariners	8–2	Flanagan (4–2)	Swift (2–1)		30,334	15–18
34	May 13	@ White Sox	4–1	Pérez (3–0)	Stottlemyre (1–4)		10,583	15–19
35	May 14	@ White Sox	7–5	LaPoint (4–2)	Cerutti (1–2)	Long (2)	23,532	15–20
36	May 15	@ White Sox	6–5 (11)	Thigpen (1–3)	Eichhorn (0–2)		13,948	15–21
37	May 16	@ White Sox	5–1	Stieb (5–3)	Horton (3–6)		8,310	16–21
38	May 17	Rangers	7–6 (14)	Mohorcic (2–0)	Eichhorn (0–3)		25,170	16–22
39	May 18	Rangers	4–0	Hayward (3–0)	Stottlemyre (1–5)		25,029	16–23
40	May 20	@ Brewers	3–1	Clancy (2–4)	Wegman (4–5)	Wells (2)	19,539	17–23
41	May 21	@ Brewers	4–0	Stieb (6–3)	Bosio (6–4)	Henke (8)	38,124	18–23
42	May 22	@ Brewers	7–1	Birkbeck (2–3)	Flanagan (4–3)		37,658	18–24
43	May 23	@ Brewers	9–7	Jones (2–0)	Stottlemyre (1–6)	Plesac (9)	10,523	18–25
44	May 24	@ Rangers	13–2	Cerutti (2–2)	Hayward (3–1)	Henke (9)	26,408	19–25
45	May 25	@ Rangers	5–1	Russell (3–0)	Clancy (2–5)	Mohorcic (4)	13,528	19–26
46	May 26	@ Rangers	8–7	Williams (1–1)	Henke (0–1)		13,035	19–27
47	May 27	White Sox	4–3	Ward (1–0)	Thigpen (1–5)		31,454	20–27
48	May 28	White Sox	3–2	Pérez (5–1)	Stottlemyre (1–7)	Thigpen (8)	42,420	20–28
49	May 29	White Sox	4–2	Cerutti (3–2)	LaPoint (4–4)	Wells (3)	42,057	21–28
50	May 30	Brewers	4–1	Higuera (4–3)	Clancy (2–6)	Plesac (11)	27,275	21–29
51	May 31	Brewers	9–0	Stieb (7–3)	Bosio (6–6)		28,446	22–29

June: 17–11 (Home: 10–4; Away: 7–7)

#	Date	Opponent	Score	Win	Loss	Save	Attendance	Record
52	June 1	Brewers	7–2	Flanagan (5–3)	Birkbeck (2–5)	Ward (3)	31,012	23–29
53	June 2	@ Red Sox	5–4	Wells (3–2)	Hurst (6–3)	Eichhorn (1)	32,144	24–29
54	June 3	@ Red Sox	6–3	Stottlemyre (2–7)	Boyd (5–4)	Henke (10)	32,292	25–29
55	June 4	@ Red Sox	10–2	Clancy (3–6)	Clemens (8–3)	Ward (4)	33,067	26–29
56	June 5	@ Red Sox	12–4	Ward (2–0)	Smithson (1–2)		33,756	27–29
57	June 6	@ Indians	6–3	Farrell (6–3)	Flanagan (5–4)	Jones (13)	9,550	27–30
58	June 7	@ Indians	5–3	Bailes (6–4)	Wells (3–3)		21,696	27–31
59	June 8	@ Indians	4–2	Yett (5–3)	Clancy (3–7)	Jones (14)	10,571	27–32
60	June 10	Red Sox	3–0	Stieb (8–3)	Sellers (0–6)	Henke (11)	35,201	28–32
61	June 11	Red Sox	4–3 (10)	Ward (3–0)	Lamp (1–2)		40,461	29–32
62	June 12	Red Sox	8–2	Boyd (6–5)	Cerutti (3–3)		40,123	29–33
63	June 13	Indians	8–6	Black (3–1)	Clancy (3–8)	Jones (15)	31,133	29–34
64	June 14	Indians	3–2	Ward (4–0)	Candiotti (6–6)		31,433	30–34
65	June 15	Indians	15–3	Stieb (9–3)	Swindell (10–4)		45,472	31–34
66	June 16	@ Tigers	13–5	Flanagan (6–4)	Morris (6–8)		22,927	32–34
67	June 17	@ Tigers	12–5	Hernández (4–2)	Wells (3–4)		36,274	32–35
68	June 18	@ Tigers	6–1	Terrell (3–3)	Clancy (3–9)		42,186	32–36
69	June 19	@ Tigers	6–4	Ward (5–0)	Henneman (1–2)	Henke (12)	35,639	33–36
70	June 20	Orioles	5–2	Stieb (10–3)	Boddicker (3–10)	Henke (13)	28,301	34–36
71	June 21	Orioles	4–2	Peraza (1–2)	Flanagan (6–5)	Niedenfuer (7)	28,259	34–37
72	June 22	Orioles	4–2	Cerutti (4–3)	Ballard (3–4)	Ward (5)	28,395	35–37
73	June 23	Orioles	5–2	Clancy (4–9)	Tibbs (2–4)	Wells (4)	28,259	36–37
74	June 24	Tigers	6–3	Stottlemyre (3–7)	Terrell (3–4)	Henke (14)	40,533	37–37
75	June 25	Tigers	7–2	Alexander (7–4)	Stieb (10–4)		45,091	37–38
76	June 26	Tigers	4–1	Flanagan (7–5)	Robinson (8–3)	Henke (15)	45,278	38–38
77	June 27	@ Orioles	6–2	Ballard (4–4)	Cerutti (4–4)		17,212	38–39
78	June 28	@ Orioles	7–0	Tibbs li (3–4)	Clancy (4–10)	Thurmond (1)	16,241	38–40
79	June 29	@ Orioles	4–2	Key (3–1)	Schmidt (3–3)	Henke (16)	18,059	39–40

July: 12–14 (Home: 4–8; Away: 8–6)

#	Date	Opponent	Score	Win	Loss	Save	Attendance	Record
80	July 1	Athletics	2–1	Stewart (11–6)	Stieb (10–5)	Eckersley (24)	35,243	39–41
81	July 2	Athletics	11–3	Young (6–5)	Flanagan (7–6)	Nelson (3)	33,511	39–42
82	July 3	Athletics	9–8 (16)	Burns (1–0)	Cerutti (4–5)		32,329	39–43
83	July 4	Angels	11–6	Cliburn (3–0)	Clancy (4–11)		30,584	39–44
84	July 5	Angels	4–1	Key (4–1)	Witt (6–9)	Ward (6)	32,284	40–44
85	July 6	Angels	5–4 (10)	Harvey (3–2)	Wells (3–5)	Moore (2)	31,312	40–45
86	July 8	Mariners	3–2	Flanagan (8–6)	Swift (6–6)	Ward (7)	30,247	41–45
87	July 9	Mariners	9–3	Bankhead (4–3)	Stottlemyre (3–8)		31,373	41–46
88	July 10	Mariners	5–0	Key (5–1)	Moore (4–9)		35,323	42–46
89	July 14	@ Athletics	7–1	Flanagan (9–6)	Welch (10–6)		20,639	43–46
90	July 15	@ Athletics	1–0	Key (6–1)	Stewart (12–8)		26,476	44–46
91	July 16	@ Athletics	4–1	Davis (7–4)	Stieb (10–6)	Eckersley (27)	33,287	44–47
92	July 17	@ Athletics	9–6	Ward (6–0)	Young (6–7)	Henke (17)	31,695	45–47
93	July 18	@ Angels	12–2	Musselman (1–0)	Finley (5–9)	Clancy (1)	24,241	46–47
94	July 19	@ Angels	7–6	Henke (1–1)	Harvey (4–3)		24,131	47–47
95	July 20	@ Angels	7–6	Minton (3–1)	Cerutti (4–6)	Moore (4)	25,598	47–48
96	July 21	@ Mariners	6–2	Bankhead (5–4)	Stieb (10–7)	Schooler (7)	9,024	47–49
97	July 22	@ Mariners	10–9 (10)	Schooler (2–3)	Henke (1–2)		10,506	47–50
98	July 23	@ Mariners	5–2	Musselman (2–0)	Trout (4–6)		17,979	48–50
99	July 24	@ Mariners	6–0	Flanagan (10–6)	Langston (7–9)		10,487	49–50
100	July 25	@ Twins	5–4	Winn (1–0)	Henke (1–3)		31,936	49–51
101	July 26	@ Twins	6–3	Portugal (1–1)	Ward (6–1)	Reardon (26)	42,185	49–52
102	July 27	@ Twins	4–1	Cerutti (5–6)	Viola (16–3)	Henke (18)	51,687	50–52
103	July 29	Yankees	7–1	Musselman (3–0)	Dotson (8–4)		42,453	51–52
104	July 30	Yankees	3–1	Candelaria (12–6)	Flanagan (10–7)	Righetti (15)	45,457	51–53
105	July 31	Yankees	6–3	Rhoden (7–6)	Key (6–2)	Righetti (16)	41,401	51–54

August: 14–14 (Home: 7–7; Away: 7–7)

#	Date	Opponent	Score	Win	Loss	Save	Attendance	Record
106	August 1	Twins	3–1	Stieb (11–7)	Viola (16–4)	Henke (19)	33,206	52–54
107	August 2	Twins	11–1	Clancy (5–11)	Lea (6–5)		30,327	53–54
108	August 3	Twins	8–3	Atherton (6–5)	Musselman (3–1)	Reardon (27)	31,340	53–55
109	August 4	Twins	2–1	Anderson (9–7)	Flanagan (10–8)		21,140	53–56
110	August 5	Royals	7–6	Ward (7–1)	Power (5–5)	Henke (20)	31,357	54–56
111	August 6	Royals	11–1	Gubicza (14–6)	Stieb (11–8)		34,411	54–57
112	August 7	Royals	5–1	Bannister (9–9)	Clancy (5–12)		37,304	54–58
113	August 8	Royals	5–1	Musselman (4–1)	Saberhagen (12–11)	Henke (21)	32,234	55–58
114	August 9	@ Yankees	6–3	Flanagan (11–8)	Candelaria (12–7)	Ward (8)	30,089	56–58
115	August 10	@ Yankees	5–0	Key (7–2)	Rhoden (7–8)	Henke (22)	28,026	57–58
116	August 11	@ Yankees	6–5 (11)	Ward (8–1)	Righetti (3–3)		30,347	58–58
117	August 12	@ Royals	3–2	Clancy (6–12)	Bannister (9–10)	Henke (23)	31,858	59–58
118	August 13	@ Royals	2–0	Musselman (5–1)	Saberhagen (12–12)	Ward (9)	40,204	60–58
119	August 14	@ Royals	6–0	Aquino (1–0)	Flanagan (11–9)		27,262	60–59
120	August 16	@ White Sox	5–4	McDowell (5–8)	Key (7–3)	Thigpen (26)	15,706	60–60
121	August 17	@ White Sox	5–1	Reuss (9–7)	Clancy (6–13)	Rosenberg (1)	14,367	60–61
122	August 19	Brewers	7–4 (10)	Nieves (5–5)	Ward (8–2)	Plesac (29)	34,178	60–62
123	August 20	Brewers	8–1	Higuera (10–8)	Flanagan (11–10)		38,315	60–63
124	August 21	Brewers	8–4	Key (8–3)	August (7–6)		38,424	61–63
125	August 22	White Sox	6–3	Stieb (12–8)	Reuss (9–8)		30,501	62–63
126	August 23	White Sox	7–2	Clancy (7–13)	Pérez (11–8)	Ward (10)	28,443	63–63
127	August 24	White Sox	6–4	Long (5–9)	Musselman (5–2)	Thigpen (27)	33,385	63–64
128	August 26	@ Rangers	5–1	Kilgus (11–11)	Flanagan (11–11)	Williams (17)	13,642	63–65
129	August 27	@ Rangers	5–3	Hough (11–14)	Key (8–4)	Williams (18)	21,578	63–66
130	August 28	@ Rangers	6–5 (11)	Henke (2–3)	McMurtry (2–2)		10,166	64–66
131	August 29	@ Brewers	6–1	Clancy (8–13)	Filer (5–8)		10,207	65–66
132	August 30	@ Brewers	6–2	Higuera (12–8)	Musselman (5–3)		11,876	65–67
133	August 31	@ Brewers	4–2	August (8–6)	Flanagan (11–12)	Crim (8)	11,993	65–68

September: 20–7 (Home: 12–3; Away: 8–4)

#	Date	Opponent	Score	Win	Loss	Save	Attendance	Record
134	September 1	Rangers	5–1	Key (9–4)	Hough (11–15)		30,294	66–68
135	September 2	Rangers	7–6	Henke (3–3)	Vande Berg (1–2)		30,181	67–68
136	September 3	Rangers	7–4	Castillo (1–0)	Russell (10–7)	Ward (11)	33,463	68–68
137	September 4	Rangers	9–7	Cerutti (6–6)	Williams (2–5)		34,400	69–68
138	September 5	@ Tigers	5–4 (10)	Stottlemyre (4–8)	Hernández (5–4)	Ward (12)	21,913	70–68
139	September 6	@ Tigers	7–3	Key (10–4)	Alexander (11–11)	Ward (13)	18,299	71–68
140	September 7	@ Tigers	4–3	Henneman (8–4)	Cerutti (6–7)		21,614	71–69
141	September 9	@ Orioles	8–1	Clancy (9–13)	Bautista (6–13)		14,750	72–69
142	September 10	@ Orioles	7–4	Ballard (8–11)	Musselman (5–4)	Williamson (2)	21,945	72–70
143	September 11	@ Orioles	4–2	Schmidt (8–4)	Flanagan (11–13)	Thurmond (3)	19,364	72–71
144	September 12	Tigers	6–5	Huismann (1–0)	Henke (3–4)	Hernández (9)	31,354	72–72
145	September 13	Tigers	9–1	Stieb (13–8)	Power (5–7)		32,141	73–72
146	September 14	Tigers	3–2	Ward (9–2)	Terrell (7–14)		32,469	74–72
147	September 15	Indians	3–0	Musselman (6–4)	Walker (0–1)	Henke (24)	28,544	75–72
148	September 16	Indians	4–3 (10)	Henke (4–4)	Gordon (2–4)		30,276	76–72
149	September 17	Indians	12–3	Swindell (17–13)	Key (10–5)	Dedmon (1)	32,067	76–73
150	September 18	Indians	4–0	Stieb (14–8)	Nichols (1–5)		34,422	77–73
151	September 19	Red Sox	5–4	Clancy (10–13)	Lamp (6–5)	Ward (14)	28,455	78–73
152	September 20	Red Sox	13–2	Clemens (17–11)	Musselman (6–5)		30,352	78–74
153	September 21	Red Sox	1–0	Flanagan (12–13)	Gardner (8–5)	Ward (15)	30,344	79–74
154	September 23	@ Indians	4–2	Key (11–5)	Swindell (17–14)	Henke (25)	7,995	80–74
155	September 24	@ Indians	1–0	Stieb (15–8)	Nichols (1–6)		8,157	81–74
156	September 25	@ Indians	4–3	Bailes (9–14)	Ward (9–3)		7,915	81–75
157	September 26	@ Red Sox	11–1	Musselman (7–5)	Gardner (8–6)		33,953	82–75
158	September 27	@ Red Sox	15–9	Flanagan (13–13)	Smithson (9–6)		34,442	83–75
159	September 28	@ Red Sox	1–0	Key (12–5)	Hurst (18–6)		34,873	84–75
160	September 30	Orioles	4–0	Stieb (16–8)	Ballard (8–12)		32,374	85–75

October: 2–0 (Home: 2–0; Away: 0–0)

#	Date	Opponent	Score	Win	Loss	Save	Attendance	Record
161	October 1	Orioles	7–3	Clancy (11–13)	Tibbs (4–15)	Cerutti (1)	32,637	86–75
162	October 2	Orioles	9–3	Musselman (8–5)	Schilling (0–3)		34,046	87–75

== Player stats ==
= Indicates team leader

=== Batting ===
==== Starters by position ====
Note: Pos = Position; G = Games played; AB = At bats; H = Hits; Avg. = Batting average; HR = Home runs; RBI = Runs batted in

Pos	Player	G	AB	H	Avg.	HR	RBI
C	Ernie Whitt	127	398	100	.251	16	70
1B	Fred McGriff	154	536	151	.282	34	82
2B	Manuel Lee	116	381	111	.291	2	38
3B	Kelly Gruber	158	569	158	.278	16	81
SS	Tony Fernández	154	648	186	.287	5	70
LF	George Bell	156	614	165	.269	24	97
CF	Lloyd Moseby	128	472	113	.239	10	42
RF	Jesse Barfield	137	468	114	.244	18	56
DH	Rance Mulliniks	119	337	101	.300	12	48

==== Other batters ====
Note: G = Games played; AB = At bats; H = Hits; Avg. = Batting average; HR = Home runs; RBI = Runs batted in

Player	G	AB	H	Avg.	HR	RBI
Nelson Liriano	99	276	73	.264	3	23
Rick Leach	87	199	55	.276	0	23
Cecil Fielder	74	174	40	.230	9	23
Pat Borders	56	154	42	.273	5	21
Sil Campusano	73	132	41	.218	2	12
Sal Butera	23	60	14	.233	1	6
Juan Beníquez	27	58	17	.293	1	8
Rob Ducey	27	54	17	.315	0	6
Alexis Infante	19	15	3	.200	0	0
Lou Thornton	11	2	0	.000	0	0

=== Pitching ===
==== Starting pitchers ====
Note: G = Games pitched; IP = Innings pitched; W = Wins; L = Losses; ERA = Earned run average; SO = Strikeouts

Player	G	IP	W	L	ERA	SO
Mike Flanagan	34	211.0	13	13	4.18	99
Dave Stieb	32	207.1	16	8	3.04	147
Jim Clancy	36	196.1	11	13	4.49	118
Jimmy Key	21	131.1	12	5	3.29	65
Todd Stottlemyre	28	98.0	4	8	5.69	67
Jeff Musselman	15	85.0	8	5	3.18	39

==== Other pitchers ====
Note: G = Games pitched; IP = Innings pitched; W = Wins; L = Losses; ERA = Earned run average; SO = Strikeouts

Player	G	IP	W	L	ERA	SO
John Cerutti	46	123.2	6	7	3.13	65
José Núñez	13	29.1	0	1	3.07	18

==== Relief pitchers ====
Note: G = Games pitched; W = Wins; L = Losses; SV = Saves; ERA = Earned run average; SO = Strikeouts

Player	G	W	L	SV	ERA	SO
Tom Henke	52	4	4	25	2.91	66
Duane Ward	64	9	3	15	3.30	91
David Wells	41	3	5	4	4.62	56
Mark Eichhorn	37	0	3	1	4.19	28
Tony Castillo	14	1	0	0	3.00	14
Frank Wills	10	0	0	0	5.23	19
Doug Bair	10	0	0	0	4.05	8
Mark Ross	3	0	0	0	4.91	4

== Awards and records ==
- George Bell, Most Home Runs hit on Opening Day (3)
- Tony Fernández, Gold Glove Award

All-Star Game

- Dave Stieb, pitcher

== Farm system ==
Level	Team	League	Manager
AAA	Syracuse Chiefs	International League	Bob Bailor
AA	Knoxville Blue Jays	Southern League	Barry Foote
A	Dunedin Blue Jays	Florida State League	Doug Ault
A	Myrtle Beach Blue Jays	South Atlantic League	Richie Hebner
A-Short Season	St. Catharines Blue Jays	New York–Penn League	Eddie Dennis
Rookie	Medicine Hat Blue Jays	Pioneer League	Rocket Wheeler
