= 1988 New York Yankees season =

Season for the Major League Baseball team the New York Yankees

1988 New York Yankees
- League: American League
- Division: East
- Ballpark: Yankee Stadium
- City: New York City
- Record: 85-76 (.528)
- Owners: George Steinbrenner
- General managers: Lou Piniella, Bob Quinn
- Managers: Billy Martin, Lou Piniella
- Television: WPIX (Phil Rizzuto, Bill White); SportsChannel NY (Ken Harrelson, Bobby Murcer, Mickey Mantle)
- Radio: WABC (AM) (Hank Greenwald, Tommy Hutton)

The 1988 New York Yankees season was the 86th season for the Yankees. The team finished with a record of 85–76, finishing in fifth place, 3.5 games behind the Boston Red Sox. New York was managed by Lou Piniella and Billy Martin, with the latter managing the team for the fifth and final time. The Yankees played at Yankee Stadium.

== Offseason ==
- November 2, 1987: Lenn Sakata was released by the New York Yankees.
- December 11, 1987: Darren Reed, Phil Lombardi, and Steve Frey were traded by the Yankees to the New York Mets for Rafael Santana and Victor Garcia (minors).
- December 18, 1987: Rich Bordi was released by the New York Yankees.
- December 22, 1987: Steve Trout and Henry Cotto were traded by the Yankees to the Seattle Mariners for Lee Guetterman, Clay Parker, and Wade Taylor.
- January 15, 1988: John Candelaria was signed as a free agent by the Yankees.

== Regular season ==
=== Season standings ===
AL East
Team	W	L	Pct.	GB	Home	Road
Boston Red Sox	89	73	.549	—	53‍–‍28	36‍–‍45
Detroit Tigers	88	74	.543	1	50‍–‍31	38‍–‍43
Milwaukee Brewers	87	75	.537	2	47‍–‍34	40‍–‍41
Toronto Blue Jays	87	75	.537	2	45‍–‍36	42‍–‍39
New York Yankees	85	76	.528	3½	46‍–‍34	39‍–‍42
Cleveland Indians	78	84	.481	11	44‍–‍37	34‍–‍47
Baltimore Orioles	54	107	.335	34½	34‍–‍46	20‍–‍61

=== Record vs. opponents ===
1988 American League record Sources:
Team	BAL	BOS	CAL	CWS	CLE	DET	KC	MIL	MIN	NYY	OAK	SEA	TEX	TOR
Baltimore	—	4–9	5–7	4–7	4–9	5–8	0–12	4–9	3–9	3–10	4–8	7–5	6–6	5–8
Boston	9–4	—	8–4	7–5	8–5	6–7	6–6	10–3	7–5	9–4	3–9	6–6	8–4	2–11
California	7–5	4–8	—	9–4	8–4	5–7	5–8	3–9	4–9	6–6	4–9	6–7	8–5	6–6
Chicago	7–4	5–7	4–9	—	3–9	3–9	7–6	6–6	4–9	3–9	5–8	9–4	8–5	7–5
Cleveland	9–4	5–8	4–8	9–3	—	4–9	6–6	9–4	5–7	6–7	4–8	5–7	6–6	6–7
Detroit	8–5	7–6	7–5	9–3	9–4	—	8–4	5–8	1–11	8–5	4–8	9–3	8–4	5–8
Kansas City	12–0	6–6	8–5	6–7	6–6	4–8	—	3–9	7–6	6–6	8–5	7–5	7–6	4–8
Milwaukee	9–4	3–10	9–3	6–6	4–9	8–5	9–3	—	7–5	6–7	3–9	8–4	8–4	7–6
Minnesota	9–3	5–7	9–4	9–4	7–5	11–1	6–7	5–7	—	3–9	5–8	8–5	7–6	7–5
New York	10–3	4–9	6–6	9–3	7–6	5–8	6–6	7–6	9–3	—	6–6	5–7	5–6	6–7
Oakland	8–4	9–3	9–4	8–5	8–4	8–4	5–8	9–3	8–5	6–6	—	9–4	8–5	9–3
Seattle	5–7	6–6	7–6	4–9	7–5	3–9	5–7	4–8	5–8	7–5	4–9	—	6–7	5–7
Texas	6–6	4–8	5–8	5–8	6–6	4–8	6–7	4–8	6–7	6–5	5–8	7–6	—	6–6
Toronto	8–5	11–2	6–6	5–7	7–6	8–5	8–4	6–7	5–7	7–6	3–9	7–5	6–6	—

=== Notable transactions ===
- March 30, 1988: Orestes Destrade was traded by the Yankees to the Pittsburgh Pirates for Hipólito Peña.
- April 4, 1988: Rick Cerone was released by the Yankees.
- April 4, 1988: Jerry Royster was released by the New York Yankees.
- May 7, 1988: Chris Chambliss was signed as a free agent by the Yankees.
- May 10, 1988: Chris Chambliss was released by the Yankees.
- June 1, 1988: 1988 Major League Baseball draft
  - Andy Cook was drafted by the Yankees in the 11th round.
  - Frank Seminara was drafted by the New York Yankees in the 12th round.
  - Deion Sanders was drafted by the Yankees in the 30th round. Player signed June 22, 1988.
- July 15, 1988: Luis Aguayo was traded by the Philadelphia Phillies to the New York Yankees for Amalio Carreno.
- July 21, 1988: Jay Buhner, Rich Balabon (minors), and a player to be named later were traded by the Yankees to the Seattle Mariners for Ken Phelps. The Yankees completed the deal by sending Troy Evers (minors) to the Mariners on October 12.
- August 30, 1988: Cecilio Guante was traded by the Yankees to the Texas Rangers for Dale Mohorcic.

=== Roster ===
1988 New York Yankees
Roster
Pitchers: 27 Neil Allen; 45 John Candelaria; 38 Pat Clements; 36 Richard Dotson; 52 Dave Eiland; 51 Cecilio Guante; 35 Lee Guetterman; 49 Ron Guidry; 41 Charles Hudson; 25 Tommy John; 28 Al Leiter; 54 Dale Mohorcic; 47 Scott Nielsen; 46,60 Hipólito Peña; 26 Rick Rhoden; 19 Dave Righetti; 33,40 Steve Shields; 43 Tim Stoddard	Catchers: 57,58 Bob Geren; 12 Joel Skinner; 11 Don Slaught; Infielders: 29 Luis Aguayo; 47 Álvaro Espinoza; 23 Don Mattingly; 20 Bob Meacham; 13 Mike Pagliarulo; 21 Ken Phelps; 30 Willie Randolph; 17 Rafael Santana; 2 Wayne Tolleson; 29,46 Randy Velarde	Outfielders: 54 Jay Buhner; 24 Rickey Henderson; 39 Roberto Kelly; 62 Hal Morris; 22 Gary Ward; 18 Claudell Washington; 31 Dave Winfield; Other batters: 50 Chris Chambliss; 6,21,33 Jack Clark; 21 José Cruz	Manager: 1 Billy Martin; 14 Lou Piniella; Coaches: 6,40 Clete Boyer; 50 Chris Chambliss; 55,34 Mike Ferraro; 42 Art Fowler; 40 Clyde King; 48 Gene Michael; 48 George Mitterwald; 44 Jeff Torborg; 42 Stan Williams

== Game log ==
=== Regular season ===
1988 regular season game log: 85–76 (Home: 46–34; Away: 39–42)
April: 16–7 (Home: 9–4; Away: 7–3)

#	Date	Time (ET)	Opponent	Score	Win	Loss	Save	Time of Game	Attendance	Record	Box/ Streak	GB
1	April 5	1:10 pm EDT	Twins	**W** 8–0					55,802	1–0	W1	
2	April 6	1:10 pm EDT	Twins	**W** 5–3					32,756	2–0	W2	
–	April 7		Twins	**Postponed (Rain)** (Makeup date: August 5)								
3	April 8	7:35 pm EDT	Brewers	**W** 6–4					20,927	3–0	W3	
4	April 9	7:36 pm EDT	Brewers	**W** 4–1					27,021	4–0	W4	
5	April 10	1:36 pm EDT	Brewers	**W** 7–6					36,214	5–0	W5	
6	April 11	1:45 pm EDT	@ Blue Jays	L 9–17					45,185	5–1	L1	
7	April 12	7:36 pm EDT	@ Blue Jays	**W** 12–3					24,116	6–1	W1	
8	April 13	7:35 pm EDT	@ Blue Jays	**W** 5–1					24,105	7–1	W2	
9	April 14	12:36 pm EDT	@ Blue Jays	**W** 7–3					24,524	8–1	W3	
10	April 15	2:35 pm EDT	@ Brewers	**W** 7–1					55,887	9–1	W4	
11	April 16	4:08 pm EDT	@ Brewers	L 2–9					24,972	9–2	L1	
12	April 17	2:30 pm EDT	@ Brewers	L 3–6					22,199	9–3	L2	
13	April 18	8:09 pm EDT	@ Twins	**W** 18–5					30,442	10–3	W1	
14	April 19	8:05 pm EDT	@ Twins	**W** 7–6					23,724	11–3	W2	
15	April 20	8:05 pm EDT	@ Twins	**W** 7–6 (10)					22,369	12–3	W3	
16	April 22	7:39 pm EDT	Blue Jays	L 4–6 (12)					33,314	12–4	L1	
17	April 23	7:38 pm EDT	Blue Jays	L 2–3					24,046	12–5	L2	
18	April 24	1:38 pm EDT	Blue Jays	**W** 5–3					52,073	13–5	W1	

May: 17–9 (Home: 7–4; Away: 10–5)

#	Date	Time (ET)	Opponent	Score	Win	Loss	Save	Time of Game	Attendance	Record	Box/ Streak	GB

June: 12–15 (Home: 7–6; Away: 5–9)

#	Date	Time (ET)	Opponent	Score	Win	Loss	Save	Time of Game	Attendance	Record	Box/ Streak	GB

July: 15–11 (Home: 8–5; Away: 7–6)

#	Date	Time (ET)	Opponent	Score	Win	Loss	Save	Time of Game	Attendance	Record	Box/ Streak	GB

August: 9–20 (Home: 6–11; Away: 3–9)

#	Date	Time (ET)	Opponent	Score	Win	Loss	Save	Time of Game	Attendance	Record	Box/ Streak	GB

September: 16–12 (Home: 9–4; Away: 7–8)

#	Date	Time (ET)	Opponent	Score	Win	Loss	Save	Time of Game	Attendance	Record	Box/ Streak	GB

October: 0–2 (Home: 0–0; Away: 0–2)

#	Date	Time (ET)	Opponent	Score	Win	Loss	Save	Time of Game	Attendance	Record	Box/ Streak	GB

Legend: = Win = Loss = Postponement
Bold = Yankees team member

== Player stats ==
= Indicates team leader

=== Batting ===
==== Starters by position ====
Note: Pos = Position; G = Games played; AB = At bats; H = Hits; Avg. = Batting average; HR = Home runs; RBI = Runs batted in

Pos	Player	G	AB	H	Avg.	HR	RBI
C	Don Slaught	97	322	91	.283	9	43
1B	Don Mattingly	144	599	186	.311	18	88
2B	Willie Randolph	110	404	93	.230	2	34
3B	Mike Pagliarulo	125	444	96	.216	15	67
SS	Rafael Santana	148	480	115	.240	4	38
LF	Rickey Henderson	140	554	169	.305	6	50
CF	Claudell Washington	126	455	140	.308	11	64
RF	Dave Winfield	149	559	180	.322	25	107
DH	Jack Clark	150	496	120	.242	27	93

==== Other batters ====
Note: G = Games played; AB = At bats; H = Hits; Avg. = Batting average; HR = Home runs; RBI = Runs batted in

Player	G	AB	H	Avg.	HR	RBI
Joel Skinner	88	251	57	.227	4	23
Gary Ward	91	231	52	.225	4	24
Luis Aguayo	50	140	35	.250	3	8
Bob Meacham	47	115	25	.217	0	7
Randy Velarde	48	115	20	.174	5	12
Ken Phelps	45	107	24	.224	10	22
José Cruz	38	80	16	.200	1	7
Roberto Kelly	38	77	19	.247	1	7
Jay Buhner	25	69	13	.188	3	13
Wayne Tolleson	21	59	15	.254	0	5
Hal Morris	15	20	2	.100	0	0
Bob Geren	10	10	1	.100	0	0
Álvaro Espinoza	3	3	0	.000	0	0
Chris Chambliss	1	1	0	.000	0	0

=== Pitching ===
==== Starting pitchers ====
Note: G = Games pitched; IP = Innings pitched; W = Wins; L = Losses; ERA = Earned run average; SO = Strikeouts

Player	G	IP	W	L	ERA	SO
Rick Rhoden	30	197.0	12	12	4.29	94
Tommy John	35	176.1	9	8	4.49	81
Richard Dotson	32	171.0	12	9	5.00	77
John Candelaria	25	157.0	13	7	3.38	121
Al Leiter	14	57.1	4	4	3.92	60
Ron Guidry	12	56.0	2	3	4.18	32
Dave Eiland	3	12.2	0	0	6.39	7

==== Other pitchers ====
Note: G = Games pitched; IP = Innings pitched; W = Wins; L = Losses; ERA = Earned run average; SO = Strikeouts

Player	G	IP	W	L	ERA	SO
Charles Hudson	28	106.1	6	6	4.49	58
Scott Nielsen	7	19.2	1	2	6.86	4
Pat Clements	6	8.1	0	0	6.48	3

==== Relief pitchers ====
Note: G = Games pitched; W = Wins; L = Losses; SV = Saves; ERA = Earned run average; SO = Strikeouts

Player	G	W	L	SV	ERA	SO
Dave Righetti	60	5	4	25	3.52	70
Cecilio Guante	56	5	6	11	2.88	61
Neil Allen	41	5	3	0	3.84	61
Steve Shields	39	5	5	0	4.37	55
Tim Stoddard	28	2	2	3	6.38	33
Lee Guetterman	20	1	2	0	4.65	15
Hipólito Peña	16	1	1	0	3.14	10
Dale Mohorcic	13	2	2	1	2.78	19

== Awards and records ==
- Rickey Henderson, Yankees Single Season Record, Stolen Bases in a Season (93 in 1988)

== Farm system ==
Level	Team	League	Manager
AAA	Columbus Clippers	International League	Bucky Dent
AA	Albany-Colonie Yankees	Eastern League	Tommy Jones and Stump Merrill
A	Prince William Cannons	Carolina League	Wally Moon and Gene Tenace
A	Fort Lauderdale Yankees	Florida State League	Buck Showalter
A-Short Season	Oneonta Yankees	New York–Penn League	Gary Allenson
Rookie	GCL Yankees	Gulf Coast League	Brian Butterfield

LEAGUE CHAMPIONS: Albany-Colonie, Oneonta, GCL Yankees
