= 1988 Minnesota Twins season =

1988 Minnesota Twins
- League: American League
- Division: West
- Ballpark: Hubert H. Humphrey Metrodome
- City: Minneapolis, Minnesota
- Record: 91–71 (.562)
- Divisional place: 2nd
- Owners: Carl Pohlad
- General managers: Andy MacPhail
- Managers: Tom Kelly
- Television: KMSP-TV (Jim Kaat, Ted Robinson); Twinsvision (Dick Bremer, Harmon Killebrew)
- Radio: 830 WCCO AM (Herb Carneal, John Gordon)

The 1988 Minnesota Twins season was the 28th season for the Minnesota Twins franchise in the Twin Cities of Minnesota, their 7th season at Hubert H. Humphrey Metrodome and the 88th overall in the American League.

The Twins finished at 91–71, second in the American League West. 3,030,672 fans attended Twins games, at the time, establishing a new major league record. Pitcher Allan Anderson had his most successful season in 1988, winning the American League ERA title at 2.45 and compiling a record of 16–9 in 30 starts.

== Offseason ==
- November 7, 1987: Eric Bullock was signed as a free agent by the Twins.
- December 21, 1987: Don Baylor was released by the Twins.
- December 21, 1987: Dan Schatzeder was released by the Twins.
- December 21, 1987: Mike Smithson was released by the Twins.
- January 1988: Vic Rodriguez was signed as a free agent by the Twins.
- January 4, 1988: Brian Harper was signed as a free agent by the Twins.
- March 18, 1988: Sal Butera was released by the Twins.
- March 24, 1988: Billy Beane was traded by the Twins to the Detroit Tigers for Balvino Gálvez.

== Regular season ==
Five Twins made the All-Star Game, third baseman Gary Gaetti, outfielder Kirby Puckett, catcher Tim Laudner, starting pitcher Frank Viola, and relief pitcher Jeff Reardon.

On September 16, Puckett got his 1000th hit, becoming just the fifth major leaguer to achieve that total before completing his fifth year.

On September 17, reliever Reardon collected his 40th save of the season. With 41 saves as a 1985 Montreal Expo, he became the only major league player to reach 40 saves in each league.

Frank Viola became the first Twins player since Jim Perry in 1970 to win the AL Cy Young Award.

=== Offense ===
Kirby Puckett hit .356 with 24 HR, drove in 121 runs and scored 109. Puckett led the AL with 234 hits, 163 singles, and 358 total bases. Puckett's 234 hits were the most by a right-handed batter since Joe Medwick had 237 hits in 1937.

Kent Hrbek hit .312 with 25 HR and 76 RBI. Gary Gaetti hit .301 with 28 HR and 88 RBI.

Team Leaders
Statistic	Player	Quantity
HR	Gary Gaetti	28
RBI	Kirby Puckett	121
BA	Kirby Puckett	.356
Runs	Kirby Puckett	109

=== Pitching ===
The Twins had two solid starting pitchers: Frank Viola (24–7), and Allan Anderson (16–9). Viola led the AL with 24 wins. Anderson led the AL with a 2.45 ERA. Reliever Jeff Reardon had 42 saves. Bert Blyleven (10–17, 5.43 ERA) led the AL with 17 losses, 125 earned runs allowed, and 16 hit batsmen.

Team Leaders
Statistic	Player	Quantity
ERA	Allan Anderson	2.45*
Wins	Frank Viola	24*
Saves	Jeff Reardon	42
Strikeouts	Frank Viola	193

*League leader

=== Defense ===
Third baseman Gary Gaetti and center fielder Kirby Puckett each won their third Gold Glove Award.

=== Season standings ===
AL West
Team	W	L	Pct.	GB	Home	Road
Oakland Athletics	104	58	.642	—	54‍–‍27	50‍–‍31
Minnesota Twins	91	71	.562	13	47‍–‍34	44‍–‍37
Kansas City Royals	84	77	.522	19½	44‍–‍36	40‍–‍41
California Angels	75	87	.463	29	35‍–‍46	40‍–‍41
Chicago White Sox	71	90	.441	32½	40‍–‍41	31‍–‍49
Texas Rangers	70	91	.435	33½	38‍–‍43	32‍–‍48
Seattle Mariners	68	93	.422	35½	37‍–‍44	31‍–‍49

=== Record vs. opponents ===
1988 American League record Sources:
Team	BAL	BOS	CAL	CWS	CLE	DET	KC	MIL	MIN	NYY	OAK	SEA	TEX	TOR
Baltimore	—	4–9	5–7	4–7	4–9	5–8	0–12	4–9	3–9	3–10	4–8	7–5	6–6	5–8
Boston	9–4	—	8–4	7–5	8–5	6–7	6–6	10–3	7–5	9–4	3–9	6–6	8–4	2–11
California	7–5	4–8	—	9–4	8–4	5–7	5–8	3–9	4–9	6–6	4–9	6–7	8–5	6–6
Chicago	7–4	5–7	4–9	—	3–9	3–9	7–6	6–6	4–9	3–9	5–8	9–4	8–5	7–5
Cleveland	9–4	5–8	4–8	9–3	—	4–9	6–6	9–4	5–7	6–7	4–8	5–7	6–6	6–7
Detroit	8–5	7–6	7–5	9–3	9–4	—	8–4	5–8	1–11	8–5	4–8	9–3	8–4	5–8
Kansas City	12–0	6–6	8–5	6–7	6–6	4–8	—	3–9	7–6	6–6	8–5	7–5	7–6	4–8
Milwaukee	9–4	3–10	9–3	6–6	4–9	8–5	9–3	—	7–5	6–7	3–9	8–4	8–4	7–6
Minnesota	9–3	5–7	9–4	9–4	7–5	11–1	6–7	5–7	—	3–9	5–8	8–5	7–6	7–5
New York	10–3	4–9	6–6	9–3	7–6	5–8	6–6	7–6	9–3	—	6–6	5–7	5–6	6–7
Oakland	8–4	9–3	9–4	8–5	8–4	8–4	5–8	9–3	8–5	6–6	—	9–4	8–5	9–3
Seattle	5–7	6–6	7–6	4–9	7–5	3–9	5–7	4–8	5–8	7–5	4–9	—	6–7	5–7
Texas	6–6	4–8	5–8	5–8	6–6	4–8	6–7	4–8	6–7	6–5	5–8	7–6	—	6–6
Toronto	8–5	11–2	6–6	5–7	7–6	8–5	8–4	6–7	5–7	7–6	3–9	7–5	6–6	—

=== Roster ===
1988 Minnesota Twins
Roster
Pitchers: 49 Allan Anderson; 22 Keith Atherton; 40 Juan Berenguer; 38 Karl Best; 28 Bert Blyleven; 38 Steve Carlton; 46 Germán González; 53 Charlie Lea; 57 Tippy Martinez; 20 Mike Mason; 36 Joe Niekro; 19 Mark Portugal; 41 Jeff Reardon; 31 Dan Schatzeder; 23 Roy Smith; 17 Les Straker; 31 Freddie Toliver; 16 Frank Viola; 48 Jim Winn	Catchers: 12 Brian Harper; 15 Tim Laudner; 39 Dwight Lowry; 11 Tom Nieto; Infielders: 21 Doug Baker; 8 Gary Gaetti; 7 Greg Gagne; 18,33 Tom Herr; 14 Kent Hrbek; 9 Gene Larkin; 4 Steve Lombardozzi; 26 Al Newman; 18 Kelvin Torve	Outfielders: 24 Tom Brunansky; 36 Eric Bullock; 25 Randy Bush; 20 John Christensen; 27 Mark Davidson; 5 Jim Dwyer; 32 Dan Gladden; 1 John Moses; 34 Kirby Puckett	Manager: 10 Tom Kelly; Coaches: 6 Tony Oliva; 44 Rick Renick; 43 Rick Stelmaszek; 42 Dick Such; 45 Wayne Terwilliger

=== Notable transactions ===
- April 5, 1988: John Moses was signed as a free agent by the Twins.
- April 22, 1988: Tom Brunansky was traded by the Twins to the St. Louis Cardinals for Tom Herr.
- May 28, 1988: John Christensen was signed as a free agent by the Twins.
- June 27, 1988: Dan Schatzeder was signed as a free agent by the Twins.

=== Notable games ===
- September 17: Jeff Reardon becomes the first pitcher in baseball history to record 40 saves in both leagues in a 3–1 win versus the White Sox.

== Player stats ==
= Indicates team leader

= Indicates league leader

=== Batting ===
==== Starters by position ====
Note: Pos = Position; G = Games played; AB = At bats; H = Hits; Avg. = Batting average; HR = Home runs; RBI = Runs batted in

Pos	Player	G	AB	H	Avg.	HR	RBI
C	Tim Laudner	117	375	94	.251	13	54
1B	Kent Hrbek	143	510	159	.312	25	76
2B	Steve Lombardozzi	103	287	60	.209	3	27
SS	Greg Gagne	149	461	109	.236	14	48
3B	Gary Gaetti	133	468	141	.301	28	88
LF	Dan Gladden	141	576	155	.269	11	62
CF	Kirby Puckett	158	657	234	.356	24	121
RF	Randy Bush	136	394	103	.261	14	51
DH	Gene Larkin	149	505	135	.267	8	70

==== Other batters ====
Note: G = Games played; AB = At bats; H = Hits; Avg. = Batting average; HR = Home runs; RBI = Runs batted in

Player	G	AB	H	Avg.	HR	RBI
Tom Herr	86	304	80	.263	1	21
Al Newman	105	260	58	.223	0	19
John Moses	105	206	65	.316	2	12
Brian Harper	60	166	49	.295	3	20
Mark Davidson	100	106	23	.217	1	10
Tom Nieto	24	60	4	.067	0	0
Jim Dwyer	20	41	12	.293	2	15
John Christensen	23	38	10	.263	0	5
Eric Bullock	16	17	5	.294	0	3
Kelvin Torve	12	16	3	.188	1	2
Doug Baker	11	7	0	.000	0	0
Dwight Lowry	7	7	0	.000	0	0

=== Pitching ===
= Indicates league leader

==== Starting pitchers ====
Note: G = Games pitched; IP = Innings pitched; W = Wins; L = Losses; ERA = Earned run average; SO = Strikeouts

Player	G	IP	W	L	ERA	SO
Frank Viola	35	255.1	24	7	2.64	193
Bert Blyleven	33	207.1	10	17	5.43	145
Allan Anderson	30	202.1	16	9	2.45	83
Charlie Lea	24	130.0	7	7	4.85	72
Freddie Toliver	21	114.2	7	6	4.24	69
Les Straker	16	82.2	2	5	3.92	23

==== Other pitchers ====
Note: G = Games pitched; IP = Innings pitched; W = Wins; L = Losses; ERA = Earned run average; SO = Strikeouts

Player	G	IP	W	L	ERA	SO
Roy Smith	9	37.0	3	0	2.68	17
Joe Niekro	5	11.2	1	1	10.03	7
Steve Carlton	4	9.2	0	1	16.76	5

==== Relief pitchers ====
Note: G = Games pitched; W = Wins; L = Losses; SV = Saves; ERA = Earned run average; SO = Strikeouts

Player	G	W	L	SV	ERA	SO
Jeff Reardon	63	2	4	42	2.47	56
Juan Berenguer	57	8	4	2	3.96	99
Keith Atherton	49	7	5	3	3.41	43
Mark Portugal	26	3	3	3	4.53	31
Germán González	16	0	0	1	3.38	19
Karl Best	11	0	0	0	6.00	9
Dan Schatzeder	10	0	1	0	1.74	7
Jim Winn	9	1	0	0	6.00	9
Mike Mason	5	0	1	0	10.80	7
Tippy Martinez	3	0	0	0	18.00	3
Dan Gladden	1	0	0	0	0.00	0

== Awards and honors ==
- Frank Viola, Pitcher, Cy Young Award
- Gary Gaetti, Third Baseman, Gold Glove Award
- Kirby Puckett, Centerfield, Gold Glove Award
- Kirby Puckett – American League Leader At-Bats (657)
- Kirby Puckett – American League Leader Hits (234)
- Kirby Puckett – American League Leader Singles (163)
- Kirby Puckett – Major League Baseball Leader Total Bases (358)
- Frank Viola – Major League Baseball Leader Total Wins (24)

All-Star Game

- Gary Gaetti, third base, reserve
- Tim Laudner, catcher, reserve
- Kirby Puckett, outfield, reserve
- Jeff Reardon, relief pitcher, reserve
- Frank Viola, pitcher, starter

== Farm system ==
Level	Team	League	Manager
AAA	Portland Beavers	Pacific Coast League	Jim Mahoney and Jim Shellenback
AA	Orlando Twins	Southern League	Duane Gustavson
A	Visalia Oaks	California League	Scott Ullger
A	Kenosha Twins	Midwest League	Ron Gardenhire
Rookie	Elizabethton Twins	Appalachian League	Ray Smith
