= José Cecena =

Mexican baseball player (born 1963)

José Ceceña
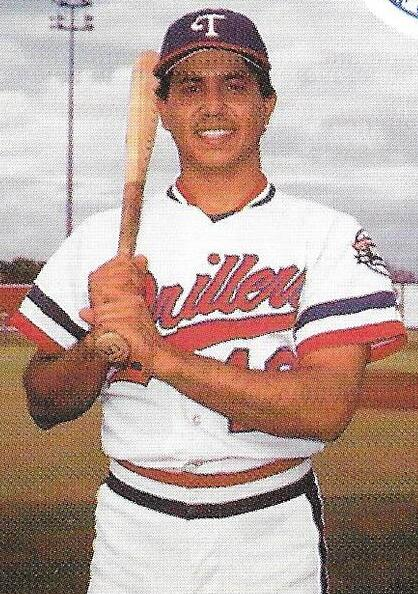
- Cecena with the Tulsa Drillers c. 1987
- Pitcher
- Born: August 20, 1963 (age 61); Ciudad Obregón, Mexico
- Batted: Right Threw: Right

MLB debut
- April 6, 1988, for the Texas Rangers

Last MLB appearance
- June 18, 1988, for the Texas Rangers

MLB statistics
- Win–loss record: 0–0
- Earned run average: 4.78
- Strikeouts: 27
- Stats at Baseball Reference

Teams
- Texas Rangers (1988)

José Isabel (Lugo) Ceceña (born August 20, 1963) is a Mexican former Major League Baseball pitcher who played in 1988 with the Texas Rangers. Jose was signed as a non-drafted free agent by Philadelphia Phillies (December 10, 1985). Jose was selected by Texas Rangers from Philadelphia Phillies in the minor league draft (December 9, 1986).
