= Guy Hoffman (baseball) =

American baseball player (born 1956)

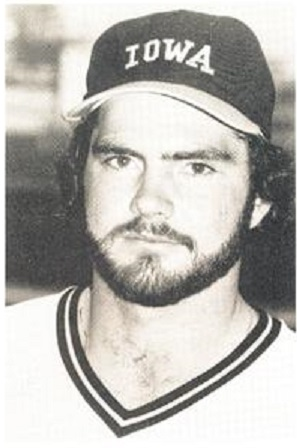
- Hoffman with the 1979 Iowa Oaks
- Pitcher
- Born: July 9, 1956 (age 69); Ottawa, Illinois, U.S.
- Batted: Left Threw: Left

Professional debut
- MLB: July 4, 1979, for the Chicago White Sox
- NPB: April 12, 1989, for the Orix Braves

Last appearance
- MLB: September 21, 1988, for the Texas Rangers
- NPB: July 20, 1991, for the Orix BlueWave

MLB statistics
- Win–loss record: 17–17
- Earned run average: 4.25
- Strikeouts: 187
- Stats at Baseball Reference

Teams
- Chicago White Sox (1979–1980, 1983); Chicago Cubs (1986); Cincinnati Reds (1987); Texas Rangers (1988); Orix Braves / BlueWave (1989–1991)

Guy Alan Hoffman (born July 9, 1956) is an American former pitcher. He played high school baseball at Marquette High School in Ottawa, Illinois. He graduated from Marquette in 1974. He played all or part of six seasons in the Major League Baseball from 1979 to 1988, chiefly as a reliever. After his MLB career, he played three seasons for the Orix BlueWave in the Nippon Professional Baseball (NPB) from 1989 until 1991

== Pro career ==
Hoffman signed with the Chicago White Sox as an undrafted amateur free agent on July 17, 1978. He made his professional debut for the Appleton Foxes of the Midwest league. Hoffman was part of a well stocked pitching staff that included prospects like Britt Burns and LaMarr Hoyt. Hoffman went 2–0 with two saves, appearing in seven games. The next season, Hoffman was promoted to the Iowa Oaks, a team well stocked as well with future major league talent like Harold Baines, Kevin Bell, Rusty Kuntz, Marv Foley, and Thad Bosley. Though the Sparks finished 69-67 (manager Joe Sparks was fired midseason, and Tony LaRussa was hired to replace him), Hoffman went 6–0 with a 3.34 ERA and 34 strikeouts. Being undefeated over the course of two minor league seasons was good enough for the White Sox to promote Hoffman to the major league roster. On July 4, 1979, Hoffman made his MLB debut. Coming on in relief of starting pitcher Ross Baumgarten, Hoffman pitched two innings, giving up one hit, walking two, and striking out one in Chicago's 16–4 win over the Cleveland Indians. Even though Hoffman allowed the hit that scored Duane Kuiper, Kuiper was still Baumgarten's responsibility. In his first full inning of work, Hoffman struck out Toby Harrah, allowed a hit to Cliff Johnson, then retired Gary Alexander and later, Dave Rosello to leave Kuiper stranded.

However, the major league experience proved to be a wake-up call for Hoffman, who went 0–5, earning the first losses of his professional career. He was sent back to the minors for more seasoning, and his career began to have its ups and downs. He appeared in just 11 games for the White Sox in 1983, spending the rest of the season in the minors. At the end of the 1984 season, the White Sox gave Hoffman his outright release. In 1985, he signed with crosstown rivals the Chicago Cubs. While Hoffman went 6-2 for the Cubs, he struggled to stay in the majors. Before spring training in 1987, the Cubs traded Hoffman to the Cincinnati Reds for third baseman Wade Rowdon. At the age of 30, Hoffman had his most productive season in the majors, going 9-10 and starting 22 games, the most he would ever start in the majors. Despite his success, the Reds released Hoffman at the end of the season, and he signed with the Texas Rangers the following spring. Much like with the Cubs, Hoffman played in only a handful of games for Texas. Hoffman appeared in his final MLB game on September 21, 1988, against the very team he made his MLB debut with, the Chicago White Sox. Hoffman faced two batters before being replaced by Ed Vande Berg. The Rangers lost 6–1.

Hoffman then went to Japan to play three seasons for the Orix Braves. Hoffman went 20–19 over three seasons before retiring in 1991 at the age of 34.

== Sources ==
- Career statistics from Baseball Reference · Baseball Reference (Minors) · Retrosheet · Baseball Almanac
