= James Steels =

American baseball player (born 1961)

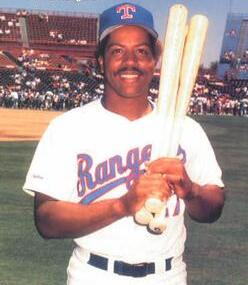
- Steels with the Texas Rangers c. 1988
- Outfielder
- Born: May 30, 1961; Bentonia, Mississippi, U.S.
- Batted: Left Threw: Left

MLB debut
- April 6, 1987, for the San Diego Padres

Last MLB appearance
- May 19, 1989, for the San Francisco Giants

MLB statistics
- Batting average: .180
- Home runs: 0
- Runs batted in: 11
- Stats at Baseball Reference

Teams
- San Diego Padres (1987); Texas Rangers (1988); San Francisco Giants (1989)

James Earl Steels (born May 30, 1961) is an American former outfielder. He played for the San Diego Padres, Texas Rangers, and San Francisco Giants. James is a resident of Santa Maria, California.

He also participated at the Puerto Rican Winter Baseball League, as a member of the Criollos de Caguas team.
