= 1988 Kansas City Royals season =

1988 Kansas City Royals
- League: American League
- Division: West
- Ballpark: Royals Stadium
- City: Kansas City, Missouri
- Record: 84–77 (.522)
- Divisional place: 3rd
- Owners: Ewing Kauffman
- General managers: John Schuerholz
- Managers: John Wathan
- Television: WDAF-TV (Paul Splittorff, Denny Trease)
- Radio: WIBW (AM) (Denny Matthews, Fred White)

The 1988 Kansas City Royals season was the 20th season for the franchise, their 16th at Kauffman Stadium and their 2nd full season under the management of John Wathan. The Royals improved on their 83–79 record from 1987 and finished third in the American League West with an 84–77 record, However, they were eliminated from postseason contention for the 3rd consecutive season.

== Offseason ==
- November 6, 1987: Danny Jackson and Angel Salazar are traded by the Royals to the Cincinnati Reds for Kurt Stillwell and Ted Power.
- December 10, 1987: Mélido Pérez, John Davis, Greg Hibbard, and Chuck Mount (minors) were traded by the Royals to the Chicago White Sox for Floyd Bannister and Dave Cochrane.

== Regular season ==
- On Opening Day, the Royals faced the Toronto Blue Jays. The Blue Jays' George Bell set a record for the most home runs hit on Opening Day with three.

=== Season standings ===
AL West
| Team | W | L | Pct. | GB | Home | Road |
|---|---|---|---|---|---|---|
| Oakland Athletics | 104 | 58 | .642 | — | 54‍–‍27 | 50‍–‍31 |
| Minnesota Twins | 91 | 71 | .562 | 13 | 47‍–‍34 | 44‍–‍37 |
| Kansas City Royals | 84 | 77 | .522 | 19½ | 44‍–‍36 | 40‍–‍41 |
| California Angels | 75 | 87 | .463 | 29 | 35‍–‍46 | 40‍–‍41 |
| Chicago White Sox | 71 | 90 | .441 | 32½ | 40‍–‍41 | 31‍–‍49 |
| Texas Rangers | 70 | 91 | .435 | 33½ | 38‍–‍43 | 32‍–‍48 |
| Seattle Mariners | 68 | 93 | .422 | 35½ | 37‍–‍44 | 31‍–‍49 |

=== Record vs. opponents ===
1988 American League record Sources:
| Team | BAL | BOS | CAL | CWS | CLE | DET | KC | MIL | MIN | NYY | OAK | SEA | TEX | TOR |
|---|---|---|---|---|---|---|---|---|---|---|---|---|---|---|
| Baltimore | — | 4–9 | 5–7 | 4–7 | 4–9 | 5–8 | 0–12 | 4–9 | 3–9 | 3–10 | 4–8 | 7–5 | 6–6 | 5–8 |
| Boston | 9–4 | — | 8–4 | 7–5 | 8–5 | 6–7 | 6–6 | 10–3 | 7–5 | 9–4 | 3–9 | 6–6 | 8–4 | 2–11 |
| California | 7–5 | 4–8 | — | 9–4 | 8–4 | 5–7 | 5–8 | 3–9 | 4–9 | 6–6 | 4–9 | 6–7 | 8–5 | 6–6 |
| Chicago | 7–4 | 5–7 | 4–9 | — | 3–9 | 3–9 | 7–6 | 6–6 | 4–9 | 3–9 | 5–8 | 9–4 | 8–5 | 7–5 |
| Cleveland | 9–4 | 5–8 | 4–8 | 9–3 | — | 4–9 | 6–6 | 9–4 | 5–7 | 6–7 | 4–8 | 5–7 | 6–6 | 6–7 |
| Detroit | 8–5 | 7–6 | 7–5 | 9–3 | 9–4 | — | 8–4 | 5–8 | 1–11 | 8–5 | 4–8 | 9–3 | 8–4 | 5–8 |
| Kansas City | 12–0 | 6–6 | 8–5 | 6–7 | 6–6 | 4–8 | — | 3–9 | 7–6 | 6–6 | 8–5 | 7–5 | 7–6 | 4–8 |
| Milwaukee | 9–4 | 3–10 | 9–3 | 6–6 | 4–9 | 8–5 | 9–3 | — | 7–5 | 6–7 | 3–9 | 8–4 | 8–4 | 7–6 |
| Minnesota | 9–3 | 5–7 | 9–4 | 9–4 | 7–5 | 11–1 | 6–7 | 5–7 | — | 3–9 | 5–8 | 8–5 | 7–6 | 7–5 |
| New York | 10–3 | 4–9 | 6–6 | 9–3 | 7–6 | 5–8 | 6–6 | 7–6 | 9–3 | — | 6–6 | 5–7 | 5–6 | 6–7 |
| Oakland | 8–4 | 9–3 | 9–4 | 8–5 | 8–4 | 8–4 | 5–8 | 9–3 | 8–5 | 6–6 | — | 9–4 | 8–5 | 9–3 |
| Seattle | 5–7 | 6–6 | 7–6 | 4–9 | 7–5 | 3–9 | 5–7 | 4–8 | 5–8 | 7–5 | 4–9 | — | 6–7 | 5–7 |
| Texas | 6–6 | 4–8 | 5–8 | 5–8 | 6–6 | 4–8 | 6–7 | 4–8 | 6–7 | 6–5 | 5–8 | 7–6 | — | 6–6 |
| Toronto | 8–5 | 11–2 | 6–6 | 5–7 | 7–6 | 8–5 | 8–4 | 6–7 | 5–7 | 7–6 | 3–9 | 7–5 | 6–6 | — |

=== Notable transactions ===
- May 13, 1988: Bill Buckner was signed as a free agent by the Royals.
- May 27, 1988: Steve Balboni was released by the Royals.
- June 1, 1988: 1988 Major League Baseball draft
  - Bob Hamelin was drafted by the Royals in the 2nd round. Player signed June 11, 1988.
  - Kerwin Moore was drafted by the Royals in the 16th round. Player signed June 3, 1988.
- June 3, 1988: Bud Black was traded by the Royals to the Cleveland Indians for Pat Tabler.
- August 31, 1988: Ted Power was traded by the Royals to the Detroit Tigers for Rey Palacios and Mark Lee.

=== Roster ===
1988 Kansas City Royals
Roster
| Pitchers: 17 Rick Anderson; 27 Luis Aquino; 19 Floyd Bannister; 40 Bud Black; 54 José DeJesús; 26 Steve Farr; 31 Gene Garber; 39 Jerry Don Gleaton; 36 Tom Gordon; 23 Mark Gubicza; 35 Mark Lee; 37 Charlie Leibrandt; 21 Jeff Montgomery; 48 Ted Power; 29 Dan Quisenberry; 18 Bret Saberhagen; 31 Israel Sánchez | Catchers: 7 Ed Hearn; 8 Mike Macfarlane; 38 Scotti Madison; 24 Larry Owen; 29 Rey Palacios; 9 Jamie Quirk; Infielders: 45 Steve Balboni; 5 George Brett; 14 Bill Buckner; 51 Luis de los Santos; 2 Dave Owen; 32 Bill Pecota; 33 Kevin Seitzer; 1 Kurt Stillwell; 3 Brad Wellman; 20 Frank White | Outfielders: 27 Thad Bosley; 34 Nick Capra; 22 Jim Eisenreich; 16 Bo Jackson; 30 Pat Tabler; 4 Danny Tartabull; 25 Gary Thurman; 6 Willie Wilson | Manager: 12 John Wathan; Coaches: 32 Frank Funk; 41 Adrian Garrett; 28 Mike Lum; 46 Ed Napoleon; 42 Bob Schaefer; 44 Jimmie Schaffer |

== Game log ==
=== Regular season ===
1988 regular season game log: 84–77 (Home: 44–36; Away: 40–44)
April: 12–10 (Home: 6–3; Away: 6–7)

| # | Date | Time (CT) | Opponent | Score | Win | Loss | Save | Attendance | Record | Box/ Streak |

May: 11–17 (Home: 4–12; Away: 7–5)

| # | Date | Time (CT) | Opponent | Score | Win | Loss | Save | Attendance | Record | Box/ Streak |

June: 17–10 (Home: 9–4; Away: 8–6)

| # | Date | Time (CT) | Opponent | Score | Win | Loss | Save | Attendance | Record | Box/ Streak |

July: 12–15 (Home: 6–5; Away: 6–10)

| # | Date | Time (CT) | Opponent | Score | Win | Loss | Save | Attendance | Record | Box/ Streak |

August: 18–10 (Home: 13–5; Away: 5–5)

| # | Date | Time (CT) | Opponent | Score | Win | Loss | Save | Attendance | Record | Box/ Streak |

September: 16–12 (Home: 6–5; Away: 10–7)

| # | Date | Time (CT) | Opponent | Score | Win | Loss | Save | Attendance | Record | Box/ Streak |

October: 0–2 (Home: 0–2; Away: 0–0)

| # | Date | Time (CT) | Opponent | Score | Win | Loss | Save | Attendance | Record | Box/ Streak |

Legend: = Win = Loss = Postponement
Bold = Royals team member

== Player stats ==
| = Indicates team leader |

=== Batting ===
==== Starters by position ====
Note: Pos = Position; G = Games played; AB = At bats; H = Hits; Avg. = Batting average; HR = Home runs; RBI = Runs batted in

| Pos | Player | G | AB | H | Avg. | HR | RBI |
|---|---|---|---|---|---|---|---|
| C | Mike Macfarlane | 70 | 211 | 56 | .265 | 4 | 26 |
| 1B | George Brett | 157 | 589 | 180 | .306 | 24 | 103 |
| 2B | Frank White | 150 | 537 | 126 | .235 | 8 | 58 |
| SS | Kurt Stillwell | 128 | 459 | 115 | .251 | 10 | 53 |
| 3B | Kevin Seitzer | 149 | 559 | 170 | .304 | 5 | 60 |
| LF | Bo Jackson | 124 | 439 | 108 | .246 | 25 | 68 |
| CF | Willie Wilson | 147 | 591 | 155 | .262 | 1 | 37 |
| RF | Danny Tartabull | 146 | 507 | 139 | .274 | 26 | 102 |
| DH | Bill Buckner | 89 | 242 | 62 | .256 | 3 | 34 |

==== Other batters ====
Note: G = Games played; AB = At bats; H = Hits; Avg. = Batting average; HR = Home runs; RBI = Runs batted in

| Player | G | AB | H | Avg. | HR | RBI |
|---|---|---|---|---|---|---|
| Pat Tabler | 89 | 301 | 93 | .309 | 1 | 49 |
| Jim Eisenreich | 82 | 202 | 44 | .218 | 1 | 19 |
| Jamie Quirk | 84 | 196 | 47 | .240 | 8 | 25 |
| Bill Pecota | 90 | 178 | 37 | .208 | 1 | 15 |
| Brad Wellman | 71 | 107 | 29 | .271 | 1 | 6 |
| Larry Owen | 37 | 81 | 17 | .210 | 1 | 3 |
| Gary Thurman | 35 | 66 | 11 | .167 | 0 | 2 |
| Steve Balboni | 21 | 63 | 9 | .143 | 2 | 5 |
| Scotti Madison | 16 | 35 | 6 | .171 | 0 | 2 |
| Nick Capra | 14 | 29 | 4 | .138 | 0 | 0 |
| Luis de los Santos | 11 | 22 | 2 | .091 | 0 | 1 |
| Thad Bosley | 15 | 21 | 4 | .190 | 0 | 2 |
| Ed Hearn | 7 | 18 | 4 | .222 | 0 | 1 |
| Rey Palacios | 5 | 11 | 1 | .091 | 0 | 0 |
| Dave Owen | 7 | 5 | 0 | .000 | 0 | 0 |

=== Pitching ===
==== Starting pitchers ====
Note: G = Games pitched; IP = Innings pitched; W = Wins; L = Losses; ERA = Earned run average; SO = Strikeouts

| Player | G | IP | W | L | ERA | SO |
|---|---|---|---|---|---|---|
| Mark Gubicza | 35 | 269.2 | 20 | 8 | 2.70 | 183 |
| Bret Saberhagen | 35 | 260.2 | 14 | 16 | 3.80 | 171 |
| Charlie Leibrandt | 35 | 243.0 | 13 | 12 | 3.19 | 125 |
| Floyd Bannister | 31 | 189.1 | 12 | 13 | 4.33 | 113 |

==== Other pitchers ====
Note: G = Games pitched; IP = Innings pitched; W = Wins; L = Losses; ERA = Earned run average; SO = Strikeouts

| Player | G | IP | W | L | ERA | SO |
|---|---|---|---|---|---|---|
| Ted Power | 22 | 80.1 | 5 | 6 | 5.94 | 44 |
| Rick Anderson | 7 | 34.0 | 2 | 1 | 4.24 | 9 |
| Luis Aquino | 7 | 29.0 | 1 | 0 | 2.79 | 11 |
| Tom Gordon | 5 | 15.2 | 0 | 2 | 5.17 | 18 |
| José DeJesús | 2 | 2.2 | 0 | 1 | 27.00 | 2 |

==== Relief pitchers ====
Note: G = Games pitched; W = Wins; L = Losses; SV = Saves; ERA = Earned run average; SO = Strikeouts

| Player | G | W | L | SV | ERA | SO |
|---|---|---|---|---|---|---|
| Steve Farr | 62 | 5 | 4 | 20 | 2.50 | 72 |
| Jeff Montgomery | 45 | 7 | 2 | 1 | 3.45 | 47 |
| Jerry Don Gleaton | 42 | 0 | 4 | 3 | 3.55 | 29 |
| Gene Garber | 26 | 0 | 4 | 6 | 3.58 | 20 |
| Dan Quisenberry | 20 | 0 | 1 | 1 | 3.55 | 9 |
| Israel Sánchez | 19 | 3 | 2 | 1 | 4.54 | 14 |
| Bud Black | 17 | 2 | 1 | 0 | 4.91 | 19 |
| Mark Lee | 4 | 0 | 0 | 0 | 3.60 | 0 |

== Awards and records ==
- George Brett, Silver Slugger Award
- Willie Wilson, American League Leader, Triples
- Willie Wilson, Tied Sam Crawford's American League record, Leading AL in Triples five times

== Farm system ==
| Level | Team | League | Manager |
|---|---|---|---|
| AAA | Omaha Royals | American Association | Glenn Ezell |
| AA | Memphis Chicks | Southern League | Sal Rende |
| A | Baseball City Royals | Florida State League | Luis Silverio |
| A | Appleton Foxes | Midwest League | Brian Poldberg |
| A-Short Season | Eugene Emeralds | Northwest League | P. K. Kirsch |
| Rookie | GCL Royals | Gulf Coast League | Carlos Tosca |
