= 1988 Oakland Athletics season =

Major League Baseball season

1988 Oakland Athletics
- American League champions American League West champions
- League: American League
- Division: West
- Ballpark: Oakland–Alameda County Coliseum
- City: Oakland, California
- Record: 104–58 (.642)
- Divisional place: 1st
- Owners: Walter A. Haas Jr.
- General managers: Sandy Alderson
- Managers: Tony La Russa
- Television: KPIX/KICU-TV (Monte Moore, Ray Fosse)
- Radio: KSFO (Bill King, Lon Simmons, Ray Fosse); KNTA (Amaury Pi-Gonzalez, Evilio Mendoza)

The 1988 Oakland Athletics season was the 88th season for the Oakland Athletics franchise, all as members of the American League, and their 21st season in Oakland. The Athletics won their first American League West title since 1981, with a record of 104 wins and 58 losses (the best record in the La Russa era). In 1988, the elephant was restored as the symbol of the Athletics and currently adorns the left sleeve of home and road uniforms. The elephant was retired as team mascot in 1963 by then-owner Charles O. Finley in favor of a Missouri mule. The A's defeated the Boston Red Sox in the ALCS, but lost the World Series to the Los Angeles Dodgers in five games, including a dramatic, classic walk-off home run by the Dodgers' Kirk Gibson in game one.

1988 was the first of three straight years the A's would represent the AL in the World Series.

== Offseason ==
- October 12, 1987: Brian Harper was released by the Athletics.
- October 12, 1987: Jerry Willard was released by the Athletics.
- December 6, 1987: Ron Hassey was signed as a free agent by the Athletics.
- December 7, 1987: Gary Lavelle was signed as a free agent by the Athletics.
- December 8, 1987: José Rijo and Tim Birtsas were traded by the Athletics to the Cincinnati Reds for Dave Parker.
- December 11, 1987: Alfredo Griffin and Jay Howell were traded by the Athletics to the Los Angeles Dodgers, and Kevin Tapani and Wally Whitehurst were traded by the Athletics to the New York Mets as part of a three-team trade. Bob Welch and Matt Young were traded by the Dodgers to the Athletics. Jesse Orosco was traded by the Mets to the Dodgers. Jack Savage was traded by the Dodgers to the Mets.
- December 21, 1987: Dave Henderson was signed as a free agent by the Athletics.
- December 21, 1987: Rick Rodriguez was released by the Athletics.
- January 11, 1988: Glenn Hubbard was signed as a free agent by the Athletics.
- January 29, 1988: Rich Bordi was signed as a free agent with the Oakland Athletics.
- February 9, 1988: Don Baylor was signed as a free agent by the Athletics.
- March 9, 1988: Tony Phillips was signed as a free agent by the Athletics.
- March 28, 1988: Mickey Tettleton was released by the Athletics.

== Regular season ==
José Canseco led the American League with 42 home runs, 124 RBIs and a .569 slugging percentage. Canseco became the first member of the Athletics to have three straight 100 RBI seasons. He also had 40 stolen bases and became the first major leaguer ever to hit 40 home runs and steal 40 bases in the same season.

- July 3, 1988: José Canseco had 3 home runs and 6 RBIs in a game against the Toronto Blue Jays.

=== Season standings ===
AL West
| Team | W | L | Pct. | GB | Home | Road |
|---|---|---|---|---|---|---|
| Oakland Athletics | 104 | 58 | .642 | — | 54‍–‍27 | 50‍–‍31 |
| Minnesota Twins | 91 | 71 | .562 | 13 | 47‍–‍34 | 44‍–‍37 |
| Kansas City Royals | 84 | 77 | .522 | 19½ | 44‍–‍36 | 40‍–‍41 |
| California Angels | 75 | 87 | .463 | 29 | 35‍–‍46 | 40‍–‍41 |
| Chicago White Sox | 71 | 90 | .441 | 32½ | 40‍–‍41 | 31‍–‍49 |
| Texas Rangers | 70 | 91 | .435 | 33½ | 38‍–‍43 | 32‍–‍48 |
| Seattle Mariners | 68 | 93 | .422 | 35½ | 37‍–‍44 | 31‍–‍49 |

=== Record vs. opponents ===
1988 American League record Sources:
| Team | BAL | BOS | CAL | CWS | CLE | DET | KC | MIL | MIN | NYY | OAK | SEA | TEX | TOR |
|---|---|---|---|---|---|---|---|---|---|---|---|---|---|---|
| Baltimore | — | 4–9 | 5–7 | 4–7 | 4–9 | 5–8 | 0–12 | 4–9 | 3–9 | 3–10 | 4–8 | 7–5 | 6–6 | 5–8 |
| Boston | 9–4 | — | 8–4 | 7–5 | 8–5 | 6–7 | 6–6 | 10–3 | 7–5 | 9–4 | 3–9 | 6–6 | 8–4 | 2–11 |
| California | 7–5 | 4–8 | — | 9–4 | 8–4 | 5–7 | 5–8 | 3–9 | 4–9 | 6–6 | 4–9 | 6–7 | 8–5 | 6–6 |
| Chicago | 7–4 | 5–7 | 4–9 | — | 3–9 | 3–9 | 7–6 | 6–6 | 4–9 | 3–9 | 5–8 | 9–4 | 8–5 | 7–5 |
| Cleveland | 9–4 | 5–8 | 4–8 | 9–3 | — | 4–9 | 6–6 | 9–4 | 5–7 | 6–7 | 4–8 | 5–7 | 6–6 | 6–7 |
| Detroit | 8–5 | 7–6 | 7–5 | 9–3 | 9–4 | — | 8–4 | 5–8 | 1–11 | 8–5 | 4–8 | 9–3 | 8–4 | 5–8 |
| Kansas City | 12–0 | 6–6 | 8–5 | 6–7 | 6–6 | 4–8 | — | 3–9 | 7–6 | 6–6 | 8–5 | 7–5 | 7–6 | 4–8 |
| Milwaukee | 9–4 | 3–10 | 9–3 | 6–6 | 4–9 | 8–5 | 9–3 | — | 7–5 | 6–7 | 3–9 | 8–4 | 8–4 | 7–6 |
| Minnesota | 9–3 | 5–7 | 9–4 | 9–4 | 7–5 | 11–1 | 6–7 | 5–7 | — | 3–9 | 5–8 | 8–5 | 7–6 | 7–5 |
| New York | 10–3 | 4–9 | 6–6 | 9–3 | 7–6 | 5–8 | 6–6 | 7–6 | 9–3 | — | 6–6 | 5–7 | 5–6 | 6–7 |
| Oakland | 8–4 | 9–3 | 9–4 | 8–5 | 8–4 | 8–4 | 5–8 | 9–3 | 8–5 | 6–6 | — | 9–4 | 8–5 | 9–3 |
| Seattle | 5–7 | 6–6 | 7–6 | 4–9 | 7–5 | 3–9 | 5–7 | 4–8 | 5–8 | 7–5 | 4–9 | — | 6–7 | 5–7 |
| Texas | 6–6 | 4–8 | 5–8 | 5–8 | 6–6 | 4–8 | 6–7 | 4–8 | 6–7 | 6–5 | 5–8 | 7–6 | — | 6–6 |
| Toronto | 8–5 | 11–2 | 6–6 | 5–7 | 7–6 | 8–5 | 8–4 | 6–7 | 5–7 | 7–6 | 3–9 | 7–5 | 6–6 | — |

=== Notable Transactions ===
- June 1, 1988: Darren Lewis was drafted by the Athletics in the 18th round of the 1988 amateur draft. Player signed June 8, 1988.

=== Roster ===
1988 Oakland Athletics
Roster
| Pitchers: 46 Rich Bordi; 54 Todd Burns; 32 Greg Cadaret; 41 Jim Corsi; 14 Storm Davis; 43 Dennis Eckersley; 40 Rick Honeycutt; 19 Gene Nelson; 53 Steve Ontiveros; 38 Dave Otto; 51 Eric Plunk; 52 Jeff Shaver; 34 Dave Stewart; 35 Bob Welch; 29 Curt Young | Catchers: 24 Ron Hassey; 3 Orlando Mercado; 11 Matt Sinatro; 36 Terry Steinbach; Infielders: 30 Lance Blankenship; 9 Mike Gallego; 17 Glenn Hubbard; 27 Ed Jurak; 4 Carney Lansford; 25 Mark McGwire; 2 Tony Phillips; 7 Walt Weiss | Outfielders: 33 José Canseco; 42 Dave Henderson; 28 Stan Javier; 21 Doug Jennings; 6 Félix José; 39 Dave Parker; 22 Luis Polonia; Other batters: 12 Don Baylor | Manager: 10 Tony La Russa; Coaches: 18 Dave Duncan; 15 Rene Lachemann; 5 Jim Lefebvre; 8 Dave McKay; 45 Mike Paul; 55 Bob Watson |

== Player stats ==
| = Indicates team leader |

=== Batting ===
==== Starters by position ====
Note: Pos = Position; G = Games played; AB = At bats; H = Hits; Avg. = Batting average; HR = Home runs; RBI = Runs batted in

| Pos | Player | G | AB | H | Avg. | HR | RBI |
|---|---|---|---|---|---|---|---|
| RF | José Canseco | 158 | 610 | 187 | .307 | 42 | 124 |
| CF | Dave Henderson | 146 | 507 | 154 | .304 | 24 | 94 |
| 3B | Carney Lansford | 150 | 556 | 155 | .279 | 7 | 57 |
| 1B | Mark McGwire | 155 | 550 | 143 | .260 | 32 | 99 |
| C | Ron Hassey | 107 | 323 | 83 | .257 | 7 | 45 |
| 2B | Glenn Hubbard | 105 | 294 | 75 | .255 | 3 | 33 |
| SS | Walt Weiss | 147 | 452 | 113 | .250 | 3 | 39 |
| DH | Don Baylor | 92 | 264 | 58 | .220 | 7 | 34 |
| LF | Luis Polonia | 84 | 288 | 84 | .292 | 2 | 27 |

==== Other batters ====
Note: G = Games played; AB = At bats; H = Hits; Avg. = Batting average; HR = Home runs, RBI = Runs batted in

| Player | G | AB | H | Avg. | HR | RBI |
|---|---|---|---|---|---|---|
| Stan Javier | 125 | 397 | 102 | .257 | 2 | 35 |
| Dave Parker | 101 | 377 | 97 | .257 | 12 | 55 |
| Terry Steinbach | 104 | 351 | 93 | .265 | 9 | 51 |
| Mike Gallego | 129 | 277 | 58 | .209 | 2 | 20 |
| Tony Phillips | 79 | 212 | 43 | .203 | 2 | 17 |
| Doug Jennings | 71 | 101 | 21 | .208 | 1 | 15 |
| Orlando Mercado | 16 | 24 | 3 | .125 | 1 | 1 |
| Matt Sinatro | 10 | 9 | 3 | .333 | 0 | 5 |
| Félix José | 8 | 6 | 2 | .333 | 0 | 1 |
| Lance Blankenship | 10 | 3 | 0 | .000 | 0 | 0 |
| Ed Jurak | 3 | 1 | 0 | .000 | 0 | 0 |

=== Pitching ===
==== Starting pitchers ====
Note: G = Games pitched; GS = Games started; IP = Innings pitched; W = Wins; L = Losses; ERA = Earned run average; SO = Strikeouts

| Player | G | GS | IP | W | L | ERA | SO |
|---|---|---|---|---|---|---|---|
| Dave Stewart | 37 | 37 | 275.2 | 21 | 12 | 3.23 | 192 |
| Bob Welch | 36 | 36 | 244.2 | 17 | 9 | 3.64 | 158 |
| Storm Davis | 33 | 33 | 201.2 | 16 | 7 | 3.70 | 127 |
| Curt Young | 26 | 26 | 156.1 | 11 | 8 | 4.14 | 69 |
| Todd Burns | 17 | 14 | 102.2 | 8 | 2 | 3.16 | 57 |
| Steve Ontiveros | 10 | 10 | 54.2 | 3 | 4 | 4.61 | 30 |
| Rich Bordi | 2 | 2 | 7.2 | 0 | 1 | 4.70 | 6 |

==== Other pitchers ====
Note: G = Games pitched; IP = Innings pitched; W = Wins; L = Losses; ERA = Earned run average; SO = Strikeouts

| Player | G | IP | W | L | ERA | SO |
|---|---|---|---|---|---|---|
| Dave Otto | 3 | 10.0 | 0 | 0 | 1.80 | 7 |

==== Relief pitchers ====
Note: G = Games pitched; W = Wins; L = Losses; SV = Saves; ERA = Earned run average; SO = Strikeouts

| Player | G | W | L | SV | ERA | SO |
|---|---|---|---|---|---|---|
| Dennis Eckersley | 60 | 4 | 2 | 45 | 2.35 | 70 |
| Greg Cadaret | 58 | 5 | 2 | 3 | 2.89 | 64 |
| Rick Honeycutt | 55 | 3 | 2 | 7 | 3.50 | 47 |
| Gene Nelson | 54 | 9 | 6 | 3 | 3.06 | 67 |
| Eric Plunk | 49 | 7 | 2 | 5 | 3.00 | 79 |
| Jim Corsi | 11 | 0 | 1 | 0 | 3.80 | 10 |
| Jeff Shaver | 1 | 0 | 0 | 0 | 0.00 | 0 |

== ALCS ==
=== Game 1 ===
October 5, Fenway Park

| Team | 1 | 2 | 3 | 4 | 5 | 6 | 7 | 8 | 9 | R | H | E |
|---|---|---|---|---|---|---|---|---|---|---|---|---|
| Oakland | 0 | 0 | 0 | 1 | 0 | 0 | 1 | 0 | 0 | 2 | 6 | 0 |
| Boston | 0 | 0 | 0 | 0 | 0 | 0 | 1 | 0 | 0 | 1 | 6 | 0 |
W: Rick Honeycutt (1-0) L: Bruce Hurst (0-1) S: Dennis Eckersley (1)
HR: OAK – José Canseco (1)

=== Game 2 ===
October 6, Fenway Park

| Team | 1 | 2 | 3 | 4 | 5 | 6 | 7 | 8 | 9 | R | H | E |
|---|---|---|---|---|---|---|---|---|---|---|---|---|
| Oakland | 0 | 0 | 0 | 0 | 0 | 0 | 3 | 0 | 1 | 4 | 10 | 1 |
| Boston | 0 | 0 | 0 | 0 | 0 | 2 | 1 | 0 | 0 | 3 | 4 | 1 |
W: Gene Nelson (1-0) L: Lee Smith (0-1) S: Dennis Eckersley (2)
HR: OAK – José Canseco (2) BOS – Rich Gedman (1)

=== Game 3 ===
October 8, Oakland–Alameda County Coliseum

| Team | 1 | 2 | 3 | 4 | 5 | 6 | 7 | 8 | 9 | R | H | E |
|---|---|---|---|---|---|---|---|---|---|---|---|---|
| Boston | 3 | 2 | 0 | 0 | 0 | 0 | 1 | 0 | 0 | 6 | 12 | 0 |
| Oakland | 0 | 4 | 2 | 0 | 1 | 0 | 1 | 2 | X | 10 | 15 | 1 |
W: Gene Nelson (2-0) L: Mike Boddicker (0-1) S: Dennis Eckersley (3)
HR: OAK – Mark McGwire (1) Carney Lansford (1) Ron Hassey (1) Dave Henderson (1) BOS – Mike Greenwell (1)

=== Game 4 ===
October 9, Oakland–Alameda County Coliseum

| Team | 1 | 2 | 3 | 4 | 5 | 6 | 7 | 8 | 9 | R | H | E |
|---|---|---|---|---|---|---|---|---|---|---|---|---|
| Boston | 0 | 0 | 0 | 0 | 0 | 1 | 0 | 0 | 0 | 1 | 4 | 0 |
| Oakland | 1 | 0 | 1 | 0 | 0 | 0 | 0 | 2 | X | 4 | 10 | 1 |
W: Dave Stewart (1-0) L: Bruce Hurst (0-2) S: Dennis Eckersley (4)
HR: OAK – José Canseco (3)

== World Series ==
NL Los Angeles Dodgers (4) vs. AL Oakland Athletics (1)

| Game | Score | Date | Location | Attendance | Time of Game |
|---|---|---|---|---|---|
| 1 | A's – 4, Dodgers – 5 | October 15 | Dodger Stadium (Los Angeles) | 55,983 | 3:04 |
| 2 | A's – 0, Dodgers – 6 | October 16 | Dodger Stadium (Los Angeles) | 56,051 | 2:30 |
| 3 | Dodgers – 1, A's – 2 | October 18 | Oakland–Alameda County Coliseum (Oakland) | 49,316 | 3:21 |
| 4 | Dodgers – 4, A's – 3 | October 19 | Oakland–Alameda County Coliseum (Oakland) | 49,317 | 3:05 |
| 5 | Dodgers – 5, A's – 2 | October 20 | Oakland–Alameda County Coliseum (Oakland) | 49,317 | 2:51 |

== Awards and honors ==
- José Canseco – American League Leader Home Runs (42)
- José Canseco – American League Leader RBIs (124)
- José Canseco – American League Leader Slugging Percentage (.569)
- José Canseco - American League Silver Slugger Award (OF)
- Terry Steinbach - All-Star Game MVP
- Walt Weiss - American League Rookie of the Year
- Tony La Russa - American League Manager of the Year
- Dennis Eckersley - American League Saves Leader (45)

All-Star Game

- Terry Steinbach, catcher, starter
- Mark McGwire, first base, starter
- José Canseco, outfield, starter
- Dennis Eckersley, relief pitcher, reserve
- Carney Lansford, third base, reserve

== Farm system ==
| Level | Team | League | Manager |
|---|---|---|---|
| AAA | Tacoma Tigers | Pacific Coast League | Brad Fischer |
| AA | Huntsville Stars | Southern League | Tommie Reynolds |
| A | Modesto A's | California League | Jeff Newman |
| A | Madison Muskies | Midwest League | Jim Nettles |
| A-Short Season | Southern Oregon A's | Northwest League | Lenn Sakata |
| Rookie | AZL Athletics | Arizona League | Dave Hudgens |
