= DeWayne Vaughn =

American baseball player (born 1959)

- Pitcher
- Born: July 22, 1959 (age 67); Oklahoma City, Oklahoma, U.S.
- Batted: Right Threw: Right

MLB debut
- April 17, 1988, for the Texas Rangers

Last MLB appearance
- July 4, 1988, for the Texas Rangers

MLB statistics
- Win–loss record: 0–0
- Earned run average: 7.63
- Strikeouts: 8
- Stats at Baseball Reference

Teams
- Texas Rangers (1988)

DeWayne Mathew Vaughn (born July 22, 1959) is a former Major League Baseball pitcher who played in 1988 with the Texas Rangers. He played college baseball for the Oklahoma Sooners.
