= 1988 California Angels season =

Major League Baseball season

1988 California Angels
- League: American League
- Division: West
- Ballpark: Anaheim Stadium
- City: Anaheim, California
- Record: 75–87 (.463)
- Divisional place: 4th
- Owner: Gene Autry
- General manager: Mike Port
- Managers: Cookie Rojas, Moose Stubing
- Television: KTLA (Joe Torre, Bob Starr); Z Channel (Joe Torre, Joel Meyers)
- Radio: KMPC (Ken Brett, Al Conin); XPRS (Ruben Valentin, Ulpiano Cos Villa)
- Stats: ESPN.com; Baseball Reference

The 1988 California Angels season was the 28th season of the California Angels franchise in the American League, the 23rd in Anaheim, and their 23rd season playing their home games at Anaheim Stadium. The Angels finished fourth in the American League West with a record of 75 wins and 87 losses. The Angels closed out the year by losing twelve games in a row, longest in team history; when they lost on Opening Day the next year, it unofficially served as a thirteen-game streak. This record was broken 34 years later.

== Offseason ==
- September 23, 1987: Doug DeCinces was released by the California Angels.
- October 30, 1987: Don Sutton was released by the California Angels.
- December 1, 1987: Chili Davis signed as a free agent with the California Angels.
- December 3, 1987: Greg Minton was signed as a free agent with the California Angels.

== Regular season ==
=== Opening Day starters ===
- Bob Boone
- Chili Davis
- Brian Downing
- Jack Howell
- Wally Joyner
- Kirk McCaskill
- Mark McLemore
- Johnny Ray
- Dick Schofield
- Devon White

=== Season standings ===
AL West
Team	W	L	Pct.	GB	Home	Road
Oakland Athletics	104	58	.642	—	54‍–‍27	50‍–‍31
Minnesota Twins	91	71	.562	13	47‍–‍34	44‍–‍37
Kansas City Royals	84	77	.522	19½	44‍–‍36	40‍–‍41
California Angels	75	87	.463	29	35‍–‍46	40‍–‍41
Chicago White Sox	71	90	.441	32½	40‍–‍41	31‍–‍49
Texas Rangers	70	91	.435	33½	38‍–‍43	32‍–‍48
Seattle Mariners	68	93	.422	35½	37‍–‍44	31‍–‍49

=== Record vs. opponents ===
1988 American League record Sources:
Team	BAL	BOS	CAL	CWS	CLE	DET	KC	MIL	MIN	NYY	OAK	SEA	TEX	TOR
Baltimore	—	4–9	5–7	4–7	4–9	5–8	0–12	4–9	3–9	3–10	4–8	7–5	6–6	5–8
Boston	9–4	—	8–4	7–5	8–5	6–7	6–6	10–3	7–5	9–4	3–9	6–6	8–4	2–11
California	7–5	4–8	—	9–4	8–4	5–7	5–8	3–9	4–9	6–6	4–9	6–7	8–5	6–6
Chicago	7–4	5–7	4–9	—	3–9	3–9	7–6	6–6	4–9	3–9	5–8	9–4	8–5	7–5
Cleveland	9–4	5–8	4–8	9–3	—	4–9	6–6	9–4	5–7	6–7	4–8	5–7	6–6	6–7
Detroit	8–5	7–6	7–5	9–3	9–4	—	8–4	5–8	1–11	8–5	4–8	9–3	8–4	5–8
Kansas City	12–0	6–6	8–5	6–7	6–6	4–8	—	3–9	7–6	6–6	8–5	7–5	7–6	4–8
Milwaukee	9–4	3–10	9–3	6–6	4–9	8–5	9–3	—	7–5	6–7	3–9	8–4	8–4	7–6
Minnesota	9–3	5–7	9–4	9–4	7–5	11–1	6–7	5–7	—	3–9	5–8	8–5	7–6	7–5
New York	10–3	4–9	6–6	9–3	7–6	5–8	6–6	7–6	9–3	—	6–6	5–7	5–6	6–7
Oakland	8–4	9–3	9–4	8–5	8–4	8–4	5–8	9–3	8–5	6–6	—	9–4	8–5	9–3
Seattle	5–7	6–6	7–6	4–9	7–5	3–9	5–7	4–8	5–8	7–5	4–9	—	6–7	5–7
Texas	6–6	4–8	5–8	5–8	6–6	4–8	6–7	4–8	6–7	6–5	5–8	7–6	—	6–6
Toronto	8–5	11–2	6–6	5–7	7–6	8–5	8–4	6–7	5–7	7–6	3–9	7–5	6–6	—

=== Notable Transactions ===
- May 9, 1988: Bill Buckner was released by the California Angels.
- June 1, 1988: Jim Abbott was drafted by the California Angels in the 1st round (8th pick) of the 1988 amateur draft. Player signed August 3, 1988.

=== Roster ===
1988 California Angels
Roster
Pitchers: 41 DeWayne Buice; 42 Terry Clark; 33 Stew Cliburn; 43 Mike Cook; 36 Sherman Corbett; 48 Frank Dimichele; 31 Chuck Finley; 27 Willie Fraser; 34 Bryan Harvey; 43 Ray Krawczyk; 17 Jack Lazorko; 45 Vance Lovelace; 18 Urbano Lugo; 15 Kirk McCaskill; 38 Greg Minton; 44 Rich Monteleone; 37 Donnie Moore; 46 Dan Petry; 39 Mike Witt	Catchers: 8 Bob Boone; 6 Doug Davis; 48 Brian Dorsett; 32 Darrell Miller; 35 Butch Wynegar; Infielders: 6 Bill Buckner; 16 Jack Howell; 21 Wally Joyner; 28 Mark McLemore; 9 Junior Noboa; 14 Gus Polidor; 6 Domingo Ramos; 3 Johnny Ray; 6 Joe Redfield; 22 Dick Schofield	Outfielders: 20 Tony Armas; 11 Dante Bichette; 7 Thad Bosley; 23 Mike Brown; 24 Chili Davis; 12 Jim Eppard; 25 George Hendrick; 10 Chico Walker; 30 Devon White; Other batters: 5 Brian Downing	Manager: 2 Cookie Rojas; 47 Moose Stubing; Coaches: 1 Bobby Knoop; 51 Marcel Lachemann; 50 Jimmie Reese; 47 Moose Stubing

== Player stats ==
=== Batting ===
==== Starters by position ====
Note: Pos = Position; G = Games played; AB = At bats; H = Hits; Avg. = Batting average; HR = Home runs; RBI = Runs batted in

Pos	Player	G	AB	H	Avg.	HR	RBI
C	Bob Boone	122	352	104	.295	5	39
1B	Wally Joyner	158	597	176	.295	13	85
2B	Johnny Ray	153	602	184	.306	6	83
SS	Dick Schofield	158	527	126	.239	6	34
3B	Jack Howell	154	500	127	.254	16	63
LF	Tony Armas	120	368	100	.272	13	49
CF	Devon White	122	455	118	.259	11	51
RF	Chili Davis	158	600	161	.268	21	93
DH	Brian Downing	135	484	117	.242	25	64

==== Other batters ====
Note: G = Games played; AB = At bats; H = Hits; Avg. = Batting average; HR = Home runs; RBI = Runs batted in

Player	G	AB	H	Avg.	HR	RBI
Mark McLemore	77	233	56	.240	2	16
Darrell Miller	70	140	31	.221	2	7
George Hendrick	69	127	31	.244	3	19
Jim Eppard	56	113	32	.283	0	14
Gus Polidor	54	81	12	.148	0	4
Chico Walker	33	78	12	.154	0	2
Thad Bosley	35	75	21	.280	0	7
Butch Wynegar	27	55	14	.255	1	8
Mike Brown	18	50	11	.220	0	3
Dante Bichette	21	46	12	.261	0	8
Bill Buckner	19	43	9	.209	0	9
Junior Noboa	21	16	1	.063	0	0
Domingo Ramos	10	15	2	.133	0	0
Doug Davis	6	12	0	.000	0	0
Brian Dorsett	7	11	1	.091	0	2
Joe Redfield	1	2	0	.000	0	0

=== Pitching ===
==== Starting pitchers ====
Note: G = Games pitched; IP = Innings pitched; W = Wins; L = Losses; ERA = Earned run average; SO = Strikeouts

Player	G	IP	W	L	ERA	SO
Mike Witt	34	249.2	13	16	4.15	133
Willie Fraser	34	194.2	12	13	5.41	86
Chuck Finley	31	194.1	9	15	4.17	111
Kirk McCaskill	23	146.1	8	6	4.31	98
Dan Petry	22	139.2	3	9	4.38	64
Terry Clark	15	94.0	6	6	5.07	39

==== Other pitchers ====
Note: G = Games pitched; IP = Innings pitched; W = Wins; L = Losses; ERA = Earned run average; SO = Strikeouts

Player	G	IP	W	L	ERA	SO
Jack Lazorko	10	37.2	0	1	3.35	19

==== Relief pitchers ====
Note: G = Games pitched; W = Wins; L = Losses; SV = Saves; ERA = Earned run average; SO = Strikeouts

Player	G	W	L	SV	ERA	SO
Bryan Harvey	50	7	5	17	2.13	67
Greg Minton	44	4	5	7	2.85	46
Stew Cliburn	40	4	2	0	4.07	42
Sherman Corbett	34	2	1	1	4.14	28
DeWayne Buice	32	2	4	3	5.88	38
Donnie Moore	27	5	2	4	4.91	22
Ray Krawczyk	14	0	1	1	4.81	17
Frank DiMichele	4	0	0	0	9.64	1
Rich Monteleone	3	0	0	0	0.00	3
Mike Cook	3	0	1	0	4.91	2
Vance Lovelace	3	0	0	0	13.50	0
Urbano Lugo	1	0	0	0	9.00	1

== Farm system ==
Level	Team	League	Manager
AAA	Edmonton Trappers	Pacific Coast League	Tom Kotchman
AA	Midland Angels	Texas League	Mako Oliveras
A	Palm Springs Angels	California League	Bill Lachemann
A	Quad Cities Angels	Midwest League	Eddie Rodríguez
A-Short Season	Bend Bucks	Northwest League	Don Long

Records
Preceded by 1987	California Angels seasons 1988	Succeeded by 1989
