= Dale Mohorcic =

American baseball player (born 1956)

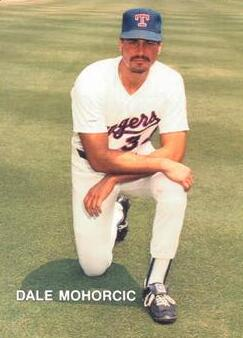
- Mohorcic with the Texas Rangers c. 1987
- Pitcher
- Born: January 25, 1956 (age 70); Cleveland, Ohio, U.S.
- Batted: Right Threw: Right

MLB debut
- May 31, 1986, for the Texas Rangers

Last MLB appearance
- October 1, 1990, for the Montreal Expos

MLB statistics
- Win–loss record: 16–21
- Earned run average: 3.49
- Strikeouts: 174
- Stats at Baseball Reference

Teams
- Texas Rangers (1986–1988); New York Yankees (1988–1989); Montreal Expos (1990)

Dale Robert Mohorcic (born January 25, 1956) is an American former professional baseball relief pitcher. He played in Major League Baseball (MLB) for the Texas Rangers, New York Yankees, and Montreal Expos from 1986 to 1990.

Mohorcic was a star at Cleveland State University. After playing on farm teams for the Toronto Blue Jays and Pittsburgh Pirates, Mohorcic signed with the Texas Rangers in 1985. His first two years, Mohorcic pitched well, having an ERA under 3.00. He holds a major league baseball record of 13 consecutive team games with a relief appearance, which he set from August 6–20, 1986. His 16 saves with the Rangers in 1987 was tied for 6th best in the AL and is the all-time single season record for pitchers named Dale. He was traded on August 30, 1988, to the New York Yankees for Cecilio Guante. His last year was with the Montreal Expos in 1990. He shares the Major League record for most consecutive games pitched at 13 with Mike Marshall.

In a 1987 game against the Milwaukee Brewers, Mohorcic was accused of doctoring the baseball. Umpires found no evidence of wrongdoing at the time, but after the game Mohorcic complained of a sore throat, and was admitted to a hospital where it was discovered that he was suffering internal bleeding as a result of having Crohn's disease and taking the pain reliever naproxen. It was erroneously reported by Peter Gammons that Mohorcic's bleeding was caused by swallowing sandpaper. He lives in Maple Heights, Ohio.
