= 1988 Major League Baseball season =

1988 MLB season
- League: Major League Baseball
- Sport: Baseball
- Duration: April 4 – October 20, 1988
- Games: 162
- Teams: 26
- TV partner(s): ABC, NBC

Draft
- Top draft pick: Andy Benes
- Picked by: San Diego Padres

Regular season
- Season MVP: NL: Kirk Gibson (LAD); AL: José Canseco (OAK)

Postseason
- AL champions: Oakland Athletics
- AL runners-up: Boston Red Sox
- NL champions: Los Angeles Dodgers
- NL runners-up: New York Mets

World Series
- Champions: Los Angeles Dodgers
- Runners-up: Oakland Athletics
- World Series MVP: Orel Hershiser (LAD)

MLB seasons
- ← 1987 1989 →

Locations of teams for the 1982–1988 American League seasons
West East
Locations of teams for the 1977–1992 National League seasons
West East

The 1988 Major League Baseball season ended with the underdog Los Angeles Dodgers shocking the Oakland Athletics, who had won 104 games during the regular season, in the World Series. The most memorable moment of the series came in Game 1, when injured Dodger Kirk Gibson hit a dramatic pinch-hit walk-off home run off Athletics closer Dennis Eckersley to win the game for Los Angeles. The Dodgers went on to win the Series in five games.

This would also be the final full season for Peter Ueberroth as MLB commissioner.

== Overview ==
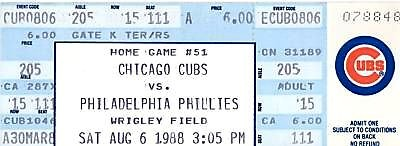
A ticket from the game where Goose Gossage earned his 300th career save on August 6, 1988.

One of the American League's best players in 1988 was Athletics outfielder José Canseco, who became the first player in history to hit 40 home runs and steal 40 bases in a single season, unanimously garnering league MVP honors. The A's surrounded him with a stellar supporting cast, led by fellow slugger Mark McGwire (with whom Canseco formed the famed "Bash Brothers" duo). Aided by strong pitching from Dave Stewart and Bob Welch and the lights-out Eckersley securing 45 saves, Oakland ran away with the American League West and swept the Boston Red Sox of Boggs, Rice, and Clemens in the playoffs before falling to the Dodgers in the World Series.

Speaking of the Dodgers, nobody expected them even to contend for the National League West title in 1988, let alone win the World Championship. However, the intensity and clutch hitting of Gibson (named the NL MVP at season's end) and the solid pitching of Orel Hershiser (who won a league-leading 23 games) spearheaded L.A. to a division championship by seven games over the Cincinnati Reds. In addition to his 23 victories, Hershiser led the National League with 267 innings pitched and 8 shutouts, and also set a record of 59 consecutive scoreless innings (formerly held by Dodger great Don Drysdale). These accomplishments, combined with his 2.26 ERA, earned him the National League Cy Young Award. However, it was in the postseason that Hershiser really distinguished himself – he started Games 1 and 3 of the NLCS against the tough New York Mets, saved Game 4 in relief, and threw a complete-game shutout in Game 7. He hurled another complete-game shutout in Game 2 of the World Series and also helped his own cause, going 3-for-3 at the plate with a run scored and an RBI, and again went the distance in the clinching Game 5. Hershiser was named MVP of both the NLCS and the World Series, capping off arguably one of the greatest seasons a starting pitcher has ever had.

== Awards and honors ==
- Baseball Hall of Fame
  - Willie Stargell

Baseball Writers' Association of America Awards
BBWAA Award	National League	American League
Rookie of the Year	Chris Sabo (CIN)	Walt Weiss (OAK)
Cy Young Award	Orel Hershiser (LAD)	Frank Viola (MIN)
Manager of the Year	Tommy Lasorda (LAD)	Tony La Russa (OAK)
Most Valuable Player	Kirk Gibson (LAD)	Jose Canseco (OAK)
Gold Glove Awards
Position	National League	American League
Pitcher	Ron Darling (NYM)	Mark Langston (SEA)
Catcher	Benito Santiago (SD)	Bob Boone (CAL)
First Baseman	Andrés Galarraga (MON)	Don Mattingly (NYY)
Second Baseman	Ryne Sandberg (CHC)	Harold Reynolds (SEA)
Third Baseman	Terry Pendleton (STL)	Gary Gaetti (MIN)
Shortstop	Ozzie Smith (STL)	Tony Fernández (TOR)
Outfielders	Eric Davis (CIN)	Gary Pettis (DET)
Outfielders	Andre Dawson (CHC)	Kirby Puckett (MIN)
Outfielders	Andy Van Slyke (PIT)	Devon White (CAL)
Silver Slugger Awards
Pitcher/Designated Hitter	Tim Leary (LAD)	Paul Molitor (MIL)
Catcher	Benito Santiago (SD)	Carlton Fisk (CWS)
First Baseman	Andrés Galarraga (MON)	George Brett (KC)
Second Baseman	Ryne Sandberg (CHC)	Julio Franco (CLE)
Third Baseman	Bobby Bonilla (PIT)	Wade Boggs (BOS)
Shortstop	Barry Larkin (CIN)	Alan Trammell (DET)
Outfielders	Kirk Gibson (LAD)	Jose Canseco (OAK)
Outfielders	Darryl Strawberry (NYM)	Mike Greenwell (BOS)
Outfielders	Andy Van Slyke (PIT)	Kirby Puckett (MIN)

=== Other awards ===
- Outstanding Designated Hitter Award: Harold Baines (CWS)
- Roberto Clemente Award (Humanitarian): Dale Murphy (ATL).
- Rolaids Relief Man Award: Dennis Eckersley (OAK, American); John Franco (CIN, National).

=== Player of the Month ===
Month	American League	National League
April	Dave Winfield	Bobby Bonilla
May	Carney Lansford	Bobby Bonilla
June	Mike Greenwell	Will Clark
July	Chili Davis	Tony Gwynn
August	Kent Hrbek	Eric Davis
September	Jose Canseco	Kevin McReynolds

=== Pitcher of the Month ===
Month	American League	National League
April	Dave Stewart	Orel Hershiser
May	Frank Viola	David Cone
June	Mark Gubicza	Greg Maddux
July	Roger Clemens	John Franco
August	Bruce Hurst	Danny Jackson
September	Mark Langston	Orel Hershiser

== MLB statistical leaders ==
Statistic	American League		National League	
AVG	Wade Boggs BOS	.366	Tony Gwynn SD	.313
HR	José Canseco OAK	42	Darryl Strawberry NYM	39
RBI	José Canseco OAK	124	Will Clark SF	109
Wins	Frank Viola MIN	24	Orel Hershiser LAD; Danny Jackson CIN	23
ERA	Allan Anderson MIN; Teddy Higuera MIL	2.45	Joe Magrane STL	2.18
SO	Roger Clemens BOS	291	Nolan Ryan HOU	228
SV	Dennis Eckersley OAK	45	John Franco CIN	39
SB	Rickey Henderson NYY	93	Vince Coleman STL	81

== Standings ==
=== American League ===
AL East
Team	W	L	Pct.	GB	Home	Road
Boston Red Sox	89	73	.549	—	53‍–‍28	36‍–‍45
Detroit Tigers	88	74	.543	1	50‍–‍31	38‍–‍43
Milwaukee Brewers	87	75	.537	2	47‍–‍34	40‍–‍41
Toronto Blue Jays	87	75	.537	2	45‍–‍36	42‍–‍39
New York Yankees	85	76	.528	3½	46‍–‍34	39‍–‍42
Cleveland Indians	78	84	.481	11	44‍–‍37	34‍–‍47
Baltimore Orioles	54	107	.335	34½	34‍–‍46	20‍–‍61

AL West
Team	W	L	Pct.	GB	Home	Road
Oakland Athletics	104	58	.642	—	54‍–‍27	50‍–‍31
Minnesota Twins	91	71	.562	13	47‍–‍34	44‍–‍37
Kansas City Royals	84	77	.522	19½	44‍–‍36	40‍–‍41
California Angels	75	87	.463	29	35‍–‍46	40‍–‍41
Chicago White Sox	71	90	.441	32½	40‍–‍41	31‍–‍49
Texas Rangers	70	91	.435	33½	38‍–‍43	32‍–‍48
Seattle Mariners	68	93	.422	35½	37‍–‍44	31‍–‍49

=== National League ===
NL East
Team	W	L	Pct.	GB	Home	Road
New York Mets	100	60	.625	—	56‍–‍24	44‍–‍36
Pittsburgh Pirates	85	75	.531	15	43‍–‍38	42‍–‍37
Montreal Expos	81	81	.500	20	43‍–‍38	38‍–‍43
Chicago Cubs	77	85	.475	24	39‍–‍42	38‍–‍43
St. Louis Cardinals	76	86	.469	25	41‍–‍40	35‍–‍46
Philadelphia Phillies	65	96	.404	35½	38‍–‍42	27‍–‍54

NL West
Team	W	L	Pct.	GB	Home	Road
Los Angeles Dodgers	94	67	.584	—	45‍–‍36	49‍–‍31
Cincinnati Reds	87	74	.540	7	45‍–‍35	42‍–‍39
San Diego Padres	83	78	.516	11	47‍–‍34	36‍–‍44
San Francisco Giants	83	79	.512	11½	45‍–‍36	38‍–‍43
Houston Astros	82	80	.506	12½	44‍–‍37	38‍–‍43
Atlanta Braves	54	106	.338	39½	28‍–‍51	26‍–‍55

== Postseason ==
=== Bracket ===
League Championship Series (ALCS, NLCS)
East	Boston	0
West	Oakland	4
East	NY Mets	3
West	Los Angeles	4

World Series
AL	Oakland	1
NL	Los Angeles	4

== Managers ==
=== American League ===
Team	Manager	Notes
Baltimore Orioles	Cal Ripken, Sr., Frank Robinson	
Boston Red Sox	John McNamara, Joe Morgan	Won AL East
California Angels	Cookie Rojas, Moose Stubing	
Chicago White Sox	Jim Fregosi	Final season as White Sox manager
Cleveland Indians	Doc Edwards	
Detroit Tigers	Sparky Anderson	
Kansas City Royals	John Wathan	
Milwaukee Brewers	Tom Trebelhorn	
Minnesota Twins	Tom Kelly	
New York Yankees	Billy Martin, Lou Piniella	Martin's final season as a Major League manager
Oakland Athletics	Tony La Russa	Won American League Pennant
Seattle Mariners	Dick Williams, Jim Snyder	Williams final season as a Major League manager
Texas Rangers	Bobby Valentine	
Toronto Blue Jays	Jimy Williams	

=== National League ===
Team	Manager	Notes
Atlanta Braves	Chuck Tanner, Russ Nixon	
Chicago Cubs	Don Zimmer	
Cincinnati Reds	Pete Rose, Tommy Helms (acting)	
Houston Astros	Hal Lanier	
Los Angeles Dodgers	Tommy Lasorda	Won World Series
Montreal Expos	Buck Rodgers	
New York Mets	Davey Johnson	Won NL East
Philadelphia Phillies	Lee Elia, John Vukovich	
Pittsburgh Pirates	Jim Leyland	
St. Louis Cardinals	Whitey Herzog	
San Diego Padres	Larry Bowa, Jack McKeon	
San Francisco Giants	Roger Craig	

== Home field attendance and payroll ==
Team name	Wins	%±	Home attendance	%±	Per game	Est. payroll	%±
New York Mets	100	8.7%	3,055,445	0.7%	38,193	$15,401,814	11.2%
Minnesota Twins	91	7.1%	3,030,672	45.6%	37,416	$13,308,966	25.7%
Los Angeles Dodgers	94	28.8%	2,980,262	6.5%	36,793	$17,141,015	18.4%
St. Louis Cardinals	76	−20.0%	2,892,799	−5.8%	35,714	$13,192,500	12.2%
New York Yankees	85	−4.5%	2,633,701	8.5%	32,921	$20,371,152	4.7%
Toronto Blue Jays	87	−9.4%	2,595,175	−6.6%	32,039	$14,412,725	33.9%
Boston Red Sox	89	14.1%	2,464,851	10.5%	30,430	$14,687,092	6.7%
Kansas City Royals	84	1.2%	2,350,181	−1.8%	29,377	$14,850,062	18.7%
California Angels	75	0.0%	2,340,925	−13.2%	28,900	$12,249,888	−11.6%
Oakland Athletics	104	28.4%	2,287,335	36.2%	28,239	$10,653,833	−16.3%
Chicago Cubs	77	1.3%	2,089,034	2.6%	25,476	$13,956,698	−9.8%
Detroit Tigers	88	−10.2%	2,081,162	0.9%	25,693	$13,432,071	10.8%
Cincinnati Reds	87	3.6%	2,072,528	−5.2%	25,907	$9,697,409	4.5%
Philadelphia Phillies	65	−18.8%	1,990,041	−5.2%	24,568	$13,900,500	11.4%
Houston Astros	82	7.9%	1,933,505	1.2%	23,870	$12,641,167	−0.9%
Milwaukee Brewers	87	−4.4%	1,923,238	0.7%	23,744	$9,502,000	30.3%
Pittsburgh Pirates	85	6.3%	1,866,713	60.8%	23,046	$7,128,500	−18.9%
San Francisco Giants	83	−7.8%	1,785,297	−6.9%	22,041	$12,822,500	50.3%
Baltimore Orioles	54	−19.4%	1,660,738	−9.5%	20,759	$14,389,075	1.0%
Texas Rangers	70	−6.7%	1,581,901	−10.3%	19,530	$6,385,631	6.6%
San Diego Padres	83	27.7%	1,506,896	3.6%	18,604	$10,723,502	−11.1%
Montreal Expos	81	−11.0%	1,478,659	−20.1%	18,255	$10,046,833	14.7%
Cleveland Indians	78	27.9%	1,411,610	31.0%	17,427	$9,261,500	2.5%
Chicago White Sox	71	−7.8%	1,115,749	−7.6%	13,775	$8,537,500	−29.6%
Seattle Mariners	68	−12.8%	1,022,398	−9.9%	12,622	$7,754,950	67.7%
Atlanta Braves	54	−21.7%	848,089	−30.3%	10,735	$13,065,674	−25.1%

== Television coverage ==
Network	Day of week	Announcers
ABC	Monday nights	Al Michaels, Jim Palmer, Tim McCarver, Gary Bender, Joe Morgan, Reggie Jackson
NBC	Saturday afternoons	Vin Scully, Joe Garagiola, Bob Costas, Tony Kubek

== Events ==
- January 12 – Former Pittsburgh Pirates slugger Willie Stargell is the only player elected to the Hall of Fame by the Baseball Writers' Association of America. Stargell becomes the 17th player to be elected in his first year of eligibility. Pitcher Jim Bunning garners 317 votes (74.2%), and falls four votes shy of the 321 needed for election in his 12th year on the ballot.
- March 1 – For the first time since 1956, the Special Veterans Committee does not elect anyone to the Hall of Fame. Phil Rizzuto, Leo Durocher, Joe Gordon and Gil Hodges are among the candidates passed over.
- April – The Baltimore Orioles begin the season with a Major League-record 21 consecutive losses. Manager Cal Ripken, Sr., was a casualty of the streak, losing his job after the sixth consecutive loss.
- April 4 – George Bell becomes the first player to hit three home runs on Opening Day, as the Toronto Blue Jays defeat the Kansas City Royals 5–3.
- April 4 – The New York Mets hit six home runs in a 10–6 win over the Montreal Expos, setting a new record for the most home runs by one team on Opening Day.
- April 29 – The Baltimore Orioles beat the Chicago White Sox 9–0 to end a 21 game losing streak to start the season. The Orioles would finish the season with a record of 54 wins and 107 losses.
- June 3 – The Los Angeles Dodgers defeat the Cincinnati Reds 13–5, with their 22 hits all being singles.
- July 12 – After being maligned by the press as an unworthy All-Star starter, catcher Terry Steinbach hits a solo home run and a sacrifice fly to lead the American League to a 2–1 victory over the National League at Riverfront Stadium. Steinbach is named the MVP.
- August 8 – The Chicago Cubs host the first night game played at Wrigley Field. The game against the visiting Philadelphia Phillies is not official with the game called due to rain in the bottom of the fourth inning with the Cubs leading 3–1.
- August 9 – The Cubs host the first complete night game played at Wrigley Field, winning 6–4 against the New York Mets.
- September 16 – Tom Browning of the Cincinnati Reds pitches a perfect game against the Los Angeles Dodgers. Browning tossed 101 pitches and struck out seven Dodgers in the Reds' 1–0 victory.
- September 17 – Jeff Reardon becomes the first pitcher to save 40 games in both leagues as the Minnesota Twins beat the Chicago White Sox 3–1. Reardon, who saved 42 games for the Montreal Expos in 1985, pitches the ninth inning for his 40th save in 47 opportunities.
- September 19 – The Oakland Athletics clinch their first American League West title since 1981 with a 5–3 victory over the Minnesota Twins. The A's would finish the season with 104 wins, a franchise record.
- September 22 – The New York Mets lock up the National League East with a 3–1 win over the Philadelphia Phillies.
- September 26 – The Los Angeles Dodgers pull out a 3–2 victory in San Diego to secure their fourth National League West championship of the decade.
- September 30 – Despite a 4–2 loss in Cleveland, the Boston Red Sox triumph in a close five-team race for the American League East by virtue of Milwaukee's 7–1 loss to Oakland.
- October 9 – The Oakland Athletics complete a four-game sweep of the Boston Red Sox in the ALCS with a 4–1 victory at the Oakland–Alameda County Coliseum. A's closer Dennis Eckersley, who saved all four Oakland wins, is named Series MVP.
- October 12 – A gruelling seven-game NLCS is decided as the Los Angeles Dodgers blank the New York Mets 6–0. Orel Hershiser, who saved Game 4 and threw a complete-game shutout in Game 7, garners the Series MVP Award.
- October 15 – In Game One of the 1988 World Series at Dodger Stadium, the Los Angeles Dodgers trailed the Oakland Athletics 4–3 in the bottom of the ninth inning when the Dodgers' Kirk Gibson, badly injured in the NLCS against the New York Mets, hobbles to the plate to pinch-hit against Oakland's lethal closer, Dennis Eckersley. With two outs, a 3–2 count against him, and Mike Davis on second base, Gibson uses his upper body and wrists to launch a backdoor slider from Eckersley into the right-field stands for a 5–4 Los Angeles victory. Gibson's home run re-energized the underdog Dodgers and shattered the confidence of the A's, who lost the series in five games. It inspired the coining of the phrase "walk-off home run", and is widely regarded as one of the greatest moments in baseball history.
- October 20 – Los Angeles Dodgers pitcher Orel Hershiser ends his dream season with a 5–2 four-hitter over the Oakland Athletics in Game Five of the World Series. The win gives the Dodgers their first World Championship since 1981, and makes them the only team to win more than one World Series in the 1980s. Hershiser is selected the Series MVP.
- December 14 – CBS pays Major League Baseball approximately US$1.8 billion for exclusive over-the-air television rights for over four years (beginning in 1990). CBS paid about $265 million each year for the World Series, League Championship Series, All-Star Game, and the Saturday Game of the Week. CBS replaces ABC (which had broadcast Monday and later Thursday night baseball games from 1976 to 1989) and NBC (which had broadcast Major League Baseball in some shape or form since 1947 and the Game of the Week exclusively since 1966) as the national broadcast network television home of Major League Baseball. It was one of the largest agreements (to date) between the sport of baseball and the business of broadcasting. The cost of the deal between CBS and Major League Baseball was about 25% more than in the previous television contract with ABC and NBC. The deal with CBS was also intended to pay each team (26 in 1990 and then, 28 by 1993) $10 million a year.

== Movies ==
- Bull Durham
- Eight Men Out

== Deaths ==
- February 20 – Bob O'Farrell, 91, catcher for four NL teams over 21 seasons who won 1926 MVP award with the Cardinals
- February 23 – Pete Donohue, 87, pitcher who had three 20-win seasons for the Reds and beat the Phillies 20 consecutive times from 1922 to 1925
- February 28 – Harvey Kuenn, 57, 8-time All-Star shortstop and outfielder, most notably with the Tigers, who batted .303 lifetime and led AL in hits four times and doubles three times; 1953 Rookie of the Year and 1959 batting champion, later managed Brewers to their first pennant in 1982
- March 21 – Edd Roush, 94, Hall of Fame center fielder for the Cincinnati Reds who batted .323 lifetime; led NL in batting twice, and in slugging, doubles and triples once each; hit 30 inside-the-park home runs, and ended career with 13th-most triples in history
- March 29 – Ted Kluszewski, 63, All-Star first baseman for the Reds who led NL in homers and RBI in 1954 and batted .300 seven times, known for his sleeveless jersey; later a Reds coach
- June 9 – Newt Allen, 87, All-Star second baseman for the Negro leagues' Kansas City Monarchs
- July 4 – Lee Weyer, 51, National League umpire since 1963 who worked in four World Series and 5 NL Championship Series
- July 20 – John W. Galbreath, 90, owner of the Pittsburgh Pirates from 1945 to 1985, during which period the team won three World Series
- September 2 – Jim Bagby, Jr., 71, All-Star pitcher for the Red Sox and Indians, led AL in starts and innings in 1943
- September 16 – Bob Trice, 62, first black player in Philadelphia Athletics history
- October 14 – Vic Raschi, 69, All-Star pitcher who won 20 games for the Yankees three straight years (1949–51), won World Series clinchers in 1949 and 1951
- November 21 – Carl Hubbell, 85, Hall of Fame pitcher who won 253 games for the New York Giants, second most among NL left-handers upon retirement; named NL's MVP in 1933 and 1936, he led league in wins and ERA three times each and had 1.79 ERA in six World Series starts; 1677 strikeouts were NL record for left-handers until 1958, and won 24 straight games in 1936–37
- November 22 – Ray Kelly, 74, sportswriter who covered the Philadelphia Athletics and Phillies since the late 1940s
- November 30 – Wally Berger, 83, All-Star center fielder for the Boston Braves who had four 100-RBI seasons, batted .300 lifetime; led NL in homers and RBI in 1935
- December 12 – Joe Reichler, 73, sportswriter and author who wrote for the Associated Press for 20 years and served as an assistant to the commissioner after 1966; editor of the Macmillan Baseball Encyclopedia since its first edition in 1969
- December 21 – Willie Kamm, 88, third baseman for the White Sox and Indians who led AL in fielding average eight times and in putouts seven times; batted .308 in 1928 and led league in walks in 1925
