= 1989 Cleveland Indians season =

1989 Cleveland Indians
- League: American League
- Division: East
- Ballpark: Cleveland Municipal Stadium
- City: Cleveland, Ohio
- Owners: Richard Jacobs
- General managers: Hank Peters
- Managers: Doc Edwards, John Hart
- Television: WUAB; Jack Corrigan, Mike Hegan
- Radio: WWWE; Herb Score, Paul Olden

The 1989 Cleveland Indians season was their 89th season in the American League. For the third consecutive season, the Indians had a losing record. The Indians had at least 73 wins for the second consecutive season.

== Offseason ==
- November 28, 1988: The Indians traded a player to be named later to the Pittsburgh Pirates for Denny González and a player to be named later. The deal was completed on March 25, 1989, with the Pirates sending Félix Fermín to the Indians and the Indians sending Jay Bell to the Pirates.
- December 2, 1988: Luis Aguayo was signed as a free agent with the Cleveland Indians.
- December 3, 1988: Jesse Orosco was signed as a free agent by the Indians.
- December 5, 1988: Bud Black was signed as a free agent by the Indians.
- December 6, 1988: Julio Franco was traded by the Indians to the Texas Rangers for Pete O'Brien, Oddibe McDowell, and Jerry Browne.
- March 26, 1989: Keith Atherton was traded by the Minnesota Twins to the Cleveland Indians for Carmelo Castillo.

== Ohio Cup ==
The first Ohio Cup, which was an annual pre-season baseball game, was played in 1989. The single-game cup was played at Cooper Stadium in Columbus, Ohio, and was staged just days before the start of each new Major League Baseball season.

No.	Year	Winner	Runner-up	Score	Venue	Date	Attendance
1	1989	Indians	Reds	1-0	Cooper Stadium	April 2	15,978

== Regular season ==
=== Season standings ===
AL East
Team	W	L	Pct.	GB	Home	Road
Toronto Blue Jays	89	73	.549	—	46‍–‍35	43‍–‍38
Baltimore Orioles	87	75	.537	2	47‍–‍34	40‍–‍41
Boston Red Sox	83	79	.512	6	46‍–‍35	37‍–‍44
Milwaukee Brewers	81	81	.500	8	45‍–‍36	36‍–‍45
New York Yankees	74	87	.460	14½	41‍–‍40	33‍–‍47
Cleveland Indians	73	89	.451	16	41‍–‍40	32‍–‍49
Detroit Tigers	59	103	.364	30	38‍–‍43	21‍–‍60

=== Record vs. opponents ===
1989 American League record Sources:
Team	BAL	BOS	CAL	CWS	CLE	DET	KC	MIL	MIN	NYY	OAK	SEA	TEX	TOR
Baltimore	—	6–7	6–6	6–6	7–6	10–3	6–6	7–6	4–8	8–5	5–7	6–6	9–3	7–6
Boston	7–6	—	4–8	7–5	8–5	11–2	4–8	6–7	6–6	7–6	7–5	5–7	6–6	5–8
California	6–6	8–4	—	8–5	5–7	11–1	4–9	7–5	11–2	6–6	5–8	7–6	6–7	7–5
Chicago	6–6	5–7	5–8	—	7–5	4–8	6–7	10–2	5–8	5–6	5–8	7–6	3–10	1–11
Cleveland	6–7	5–8	7–5	5–7	—	5–8	8–4	3–10	5–7	9–4	2–10	6–6	7–5	5–8
Detroit	3–10	2–11	1–11	8–4	8–5	—	6–6	6–7	5–7	6–7	4–8	4–8	4–8	2–11
Kansas City	6–6	8–4	9–4	7–6	4–8	6–6	—	8–4	7–6	6–6	7–6	9–4	8–5	7–5
Milwaukee	6–7	7–6	5–7	2–10	10–3	7–6	4–8	—	9–3	8–5	5–7	7–5	5–7	6–7
Minnesota	8–4	6–6	2–11	8–5	7–5	7–5	6–7	3–9	—	6–6	6–7	7–6	5–8	9–3
New York	5–8	6–7	6–6	6–5	4–9	7–6	6–6	5–8	6–6	—	3–9	8–4	5–7	7–6
Oakland	7–5	5–7	8–5	8–5	10–2	8–4	6–7	7–5	7–6	9–3	—	9–4	8–5	7–5
Seattle	6–6	7–5	6–7	6–7	6–6	8–4	4–9	5–7	6–7	4–8	4–9	—	6–7	5–7
Texas	3–9	6–6	7–6	10–3	5–7	8–4	5–8	7–5	8–5	7–5	5–8	7–6	—	5–7
Toronto	6–7	8–5	5–7	11–1	8–5	11–2	5–7	7–6	3–9	6–7	5–7	7–5	7–5	—

=== Notable transactions ===
- June 5, 1989: 1989 Major League Baseball draft
  - Alan Embree was drafted by the Indians in the 5th round. Player signed September 6, 1989.
  - Jim Thome was drafted by the Indians in the 13th round. Player signed June 18, 1989.
  - Brian Giles was drafted by the Indians in the 17th round. Player signed July 18, 1989.
- June 22, 1989: Willie Cañate was signed by the Indians as an amateur free agent.
- July 2, 1989: Oddibe McDowell was traded by the Indians to the Atlanta Braves for Dion James.
- July 27, 1989: Doug Piatt was traded by the Indians to the Montreal Expos for Rick Carriger (minors).
- August 7, 1989: Keith Atherton was released by the Cleveland Indians.

=== Opening Day Lineup ===
Opening Day Starters
#	Name	Position
20	Oddibe McDowell	LF
14	Jerry Browne	2B
30	Joe Carter	CF
9	Pete O'Brien	1B
28	Cory Snyder	RF
25	Dave Clark	DH
26	Brook Jacoby	3B
6	Andy Allanson	C
16	Félix Fermín	SS
21	Greg Swindell	P

=== Roster ===
1989 Cleveland Indians
Roster
Pitchers: 15 Neil Allen; 38,22 Keith Atherton; 43 Scott Bailes; 40 Bud Black; 49 Tom Candiotti; 37 Steve Davis; 52 John Farrell; 22 Brad Havens; 11 Doug Jones; 47 Jeff Kaiser; 54 Rod Nichols; 50 Steve Olin; 47 Jesse Orosco; 64 Rudy Seánez; 27 Joe Skalski; 36 Tim Stoddard; 21 Greg Swindell; 53 Kevin Wickander; 34 Ed Wojna; 42 Rich Yett	Catchers: 6 Andy Allanson; 76 Tom Magrann; 8 Mark Salas; 13 Joel Skinner; Infielders: 23 Luis Aguayo; 14 Jerry Browne; 16 Félix Fermín; 25 Denny González; 66 Mark Higgins; 1 Tommy Hinzo; 26 Brook Jacoby; 9 Pete O'Brien; 34 Danny Sheaffer; 10 Paul Zuvella	Outfielders: 55 Beau Allred; 36 Albert Belle; 30 Joe Carter; 25 Dave Clark; 38 Dave Hengel; 20 Dion James; 33 Pat Keedy; 45 Brad Komminsk; 20 Oddibe McDowell; 29 Luis Medina; 28 Cory Snyder; 44 Mike Young; Other batters: 31 Pete Dalena	Manager: 32 Doc Edwards (April 3 - Sept. 10); 18 John Hart (Sept. 11 - Oct. 1); Coaches: 12 Jim Davenport (Third Base); 7 Luis Isaac (Bullpen); 4 Charlie Manuel (Hitting); 2 Tom Spencer (First Base); 35 Mark Wiley (Pitching)

== Player stats ==
= Indicates team leader

=== Batting ===
==== Starters by position ====
Note: Pos = Position; G = Games played; AB = At bats; H = Hits; Avg. = Batting average; HR = Home runs; RBI = Runs batted in

Pos	Player	G	AB	H	Avg.	HR	RBI
C	Andy Allanson	111	323	75	.232	3	17
1B	Pete O'Brien	155	554	144	.260	12	55
2B	Jerry Browne	153	598	179	.299	5	45
3B	Brook Jacoby	147	519	141	.272	13	64
SS	Félix Fermín	156	484	115	.238	0	21
LF	Oddibe McDowell	69	239	53	.222	3	22
CF	Joe Carter	162	651	158	.243	39	112
RF	Cory Snyder	132	489	105	.215	18	59
DH	Dave Clark	102	253	60	.237	8	29

==== Other batters ====
Note: G = Games played; AB = At bats; H = Hits; Avg. = Batting average; HR = Home runs; RBI = Runs batted in

Player	G	AB	H	Avg.	HR	RBI
Dion James	71	245	75	.306	4	29
Albert Belle	62	218	49	.225	7	37
Brad Komminsk	71	198	47	.237	8	33
Joel Skinner	79	178	41	.230	1	13
Luis Aguayo	47	97	17	.175	1	8
Luis Medina	30	83	17	.205	4	8
Mark Salas	30	77	17	.221	2	7
Mike Young	32	59	11	.186	1	5
Paul Zuvella	24	58	16	.276	2	6
Dave Hengel	12	25	3	.120	0	1
Beau Allred	13	24	6	.250	0	1
Tommy Hinzo	18	17	0	.000	0	0
Denny González	8	17	5	.294	0	1
Danny Sheaffer	7	16	1	.063	0	0
Pat Keedy	9	14	3	.214	0	1
Mark Higgins	6	10	1	.100	0	0
Tom Magrann	9	10	0	.000	0	0
Pete Dalena	5	7	1	.143	0	0

=== Pitching ===
==== Starting pitchers ====
Note: G = Games pitched; IP = Innings pitched; W = Wins; L = Losses; ERA = Earned run average; SO = Strikeouts

Player	G	IP	W	L	ERA	SO
Bud Black	33	222.1	12	11	3.36	88
John Farrell	31	208.0	9	14	3.63	132
Tom Candiotti	31	206.0	13	6	3.37	129
Greg Swindell	28	184.1	13	10	3.10	124

==== Other pitchers ====
Note: G = Games pitched; IP = Innings pitched; W = Wins; L = Losses; ERA = Earned run average; SO = Strikeouts

Player	G	IP	W	L	ERA	SO
Scott Bailes	34	113.2	5	9	4.28	47
Rich Yett	32	99.0	5	6	5.00	47
Rod Nichols	15	71.2	4	6	4.40	42
Ed Wojna	9	33.0	0	1	4.09	10
Steve Davis	12	25.2	1	1	8.06	12
Joe Skalski	2	6.2	0	2	6.75	3

==== Relief pitchers ====
Note: G = Games pitched; W = Wins; L = Losses; SV = Saves; ERA = Earned run average; SO = Strikeouts

Player	G	W	L	SV	ERA	SO
Doug Jones	59	7	10	32	2.34	65
Jesse Orosco	69	3	4	3	2.08	79
Keith Atherton	32	0	3	2	4.15	13
Steve Olin	25	1	4	1	3.75	24
Tim Stoddard	14	0	0	0	2.95	12
Brad Havens	7	0	0	0	4.05	6
Jeff Kaiser	6	0	1	0	7.36	4
Rudy Seánez	5	0	0	0	3.60	7
Neil Allen	3	0	1	0	15.00	0
Kevin Wickander	2	0	0	0	3.38	0

== Awards and honors ==
All-Star Game

- Doug Jones, relief pitcher, reserve
- Greg Swindell, pitcher, reserve

=== Team leaders ===
- Games – Joe Carter (162)
- AB – Jerry Browne (598)
- Runs – Jerry Browne (83)
- Hits – Jerry Browne (179)
- Doubles – Joe Carter (32)
- Triples – Brook Jacoby (5)
- Home runs – Joe Carter (35)
- RBI – Joe Carter (105)
- Walks – Pete O'Brien (83)
- Strikeouts – Cory Snyder (134)
- Stolen bases – Jerry Browne (14)
- Batting average – Dion James (.306)
- On-base percentage – Jerry Browne (.370)
- Hit by pitch – Joe Carter (8)
- Wins – Tom Candiotti, Greg Swindell (13)
- Strikeouts – John Farrell – (132)
- Earned run average – Greg Swindell – (3.10)
- Saves – Doug Jones – (32)

== Farm system ==
Level	Team	League	Manager
AAA	Colorado Springs Sky Sox	Pacific Coast League	Mike Hargrove
AA	Canton–Akron Indians	Eastern League	Bob Molinaro
A	Kinston Indians	Carolina League	Ken Bolek
A-Short Season	Watertown Indians	New York–Penn League	Brian Graham
Rookie	Burlington Indians	Appalachian League	Jim Gabella
Rookie	GCL Indians	Gulf Coast League	Mike Bucci
