= 1990 Cleveland Indians season =

1990 Cleveland Indians
- League: American League
- Division: East
- Ballpark: Cleveland Municipal Stadium
- City: Cleveland, Ohio
- Owners: Richard Jacobs
- General managers: Hank Peters
- Managers: John McNamara
- Television: WUAB; Jack Corrigan, Mike Hegan; SportsChannel; Dan Coughlin, Rick Manning
- Radio: WWWE; Herb Score, Tom Hamilton

The 1990 Cleveland Indians season was the 90th season for the franchise.

== Offseason ==
- October 4, 1989: Luis Aguayo was released by the Cleveland Indians.
- November 21, 1989: Cecilio Guante was signed as a free agent by the Indians.
- December 6, 1989: Joe Carter was traded by the Indians to the San Diego Padres for Sandy Alomar Jr., Carlos Baerga and Chris James.
- December 7, 1989: Keith Hernandez was signed as a free agent by the Indians.
- December 8, 1989: Tom Brookens was signed as a free agent by the Cleveland Indians.
- January 9, 1990: Scott Bailes was traded by the Cleveland Indians to the California Angels for Colin Charland (minors) and Jeff Manto.
- January 10, 1990: Rafael Santana was signed as a free agent by the Indians.

== Regular season ==
=== Season standings ===
AL East
Team	W	L	Pct.	GB	Home	Road
Boston Red Sox	88	74	.543	—	51‍–‍30	37‍–‍44
Toronto Blue Jays	86	76	.531	2	44‍–‍37	42‍–‍39
Detroit Tigers	79	83	.488	9	39‍–‍42	40‍–‍41
Cleveland Indians	77	85	.475	11	41‍–‍40	36‍–‍45
Baltimore Orioles	76	85	.472	11½	40‍–‍40	36‍–‍45
Milwaukee Brewers	74	88	.457	14	39‍–‍42	35‍–‍46
New York Yankees	67	95	.414	21	37‍–‍44	30‍–‍51

=== Record vs. opponents ===
1990 American League record Sources:
Team	BAL	BOS	CAL	CWS	CLE	DET	KC	MIL	MIN	NYY	OAK	SEA	TEX	TOR
Baltimore	—	4–9	7–5	6–6	6–7	6–7	8–3	7–6	6–6	6–7	4–8	3–9	8–4	5–8
Boston	9–4	—	7–5	6–6	9–4	8–5	4–8	5–8	4–8	9–4	4–8	8–4	5–7	10–3
California	5–7	5–7	—	5–8	7–5	5–7	7–6	7–5	9–4	6–6	4–9	5–8	8–5	7–5
Chicago	6–6	6–6	8–5	—	5–7	5–7	9–4	10–2	7–6	10–2	8–5	8–5	7–6	5–7
Cleveland	7–6	4–9	5–7	7–5	—	5–8	6–6	9–4	7–5	5–8	4–8	7–5	7–5	4–9
Detroit	7–6	5–8	7–5	7–5	8–5	—	5–7	3–10	6–6	7–6	6–6	7–5	6–6	5–8
Kansas City	3–8	8–4	6–7	4–9	6–6	7–5	—	4–8	8–5	8–4	4–9	7–6	5–8	5–7
Milwaukee	6–7	8–5	5–7	2–10	4–9	10–3	8–4	—	4–8	6–7	5–7	4–8	5–7	7–6
Minnesota	6–6	8–4	4–9	6–7	5–7	6–6	5–8	8–4	—	6–6	6–7	6–7	5–8	3–9
New York	7–6	4–9	6–6	2–10	8–5	6–7	4–8	7–6	6–6	—	0–12	9–3	3–9	5–8
Oakland	8–4	8–4	9–4	5–8	8–4	6–6	9–4	7–5	7–6	12–0	—	9–4	8–5	7–5
Seattle	9–3	4–8	8–5	5–8	5–7	5–7	6–7	8–4	7–6	3–9	4–9	—	7–6	6–6
Texas	4–8	7–5	5–8	6–7	5–7	6–6	8–5	7–5	8–5	9–3	5–8	6–7	—	7–5
Toronto	8–5	3–10	5–7	7–5	9–4	8–5	7–5	6–7	9–3	8–5	5–7	6–6	5–7	—

=== Notable transactions ===
- April 25, 1990: Rafael Santana was released by the Indians.
- April 30, 1990: Sergio Valdez was selected off waivers by the Indians from the Atlanta Braves.
- May 7, 1990: Stan Jefferson was selected off waivers by the Indians from the Baltimore Orioles.
- June 17, 1990: Ken Phelps was purchased by the Indians from the Oakland Athletics.
- July 11, 1990: Tom Lampkin was traded by the Indians to the San Diego Padres for Alex Cole.
- August 12, 1990: Cecilio Guante was released by the Indians.
- September 16, 1990: Bud Black was traded by the Indians to the Toronto Blue Jays for Mauro Gozzo and players to be named later. The Blue Jays completed the deal by sending Steve Cummings to the Indians on September 21 and Alex Sanchez to the Indians on September 24.

==== Draft picks ====
- June 4, 1990: David Bell was drafted by the Indians in the 7th round of the 1990 amateur draft. Player signed June 12, 1990.

=== Opening Day Lineup ===
Opening Day Starters
#	Name	Position
23	Mitch Webster	CF
14	Jerry Browne	2B
22	Candy Maldonado	LF
28	Cory Snyder	RF
17	Keith Hernandez	1B
7	Chris James	DH
26	Brook Jacoby	3B
15	Sandy Alomar Jr.	C
2	Rafael Santana	SS
40	Bud Black	P

=== Roster ===
1990 Cleveland Indians
Roster
Pitchers: 34 Kevin Bearse; 40 Bud Black; 49 Tom Candiotti; 52 John Farrell; 36 Mauro Gozzo; 38 Cecilio Guante; 11 Doug Jones; 47 Jeff Kaiser; 41 Charles Nagy; 54 Rod Nichols; 42 Al Nipper; 50 Steve Olin; 47 Jesse Orosco; 32 Rudy Seánez; 57 Jeff Shaw; 21 Greg Swindell; 33 Efrain Valdez; 30 Sergio Valdez; 48 Mike Walker; 50 Colby Ward; 53 Kevin Wickander	Catchers: 15 Sandy Alomar Jr.; 4 Joel Skinner; Infielders: 9 Carlos Baerga; 10 Tom Brookens; 14 Jerry Browne; 16 Félix Fermín; 17 Keith Hernandez; 26 Brook Jacoby; 20 Dion James; 45 Jeff Manto; 6 Mark McLemore; 44 Ken Phelps; 2 Rafael Santana; 2 Steve Springer	Outfielders: 55 Beau Allred; 8 Albert Belle; 2 Alex Cole; 7 Chris James; 24 Stan Jefferson; 22 Candy Maldonado; 28 Cory Snyder; 68 Turner Ward; 23 Mitch Webster	Manager: 1 John McNamara; Coaches: 25 Rich Dauer (third base); 12 Mike Hargrove (first base); 13 Luis Isaac (bullpen); 32 José Morales (hitting); 35 Mark Wiley (pitching); 51 Billy Williams (bench)

== Statistics ==
=== Batting ===
Note: G = Games played; AB = At bats; R = Runs scored; H = Hits; 2B = Doubles; 3B = Triples; HR = Home runs; RBI = Runs batted in; AVG = Batting average; SB = Stolen bases

Player	G	AB	R	H	2B	3B	HR	RBI	AVG	SB
Beau Allred	4	16	2	3	1	0	1	2	.188	0
Sandy Alomar Jr.	132	445	60	129	26	2	9	66	.290	4
Carlos Baerga	108	312	46	81	17	2	7	47	.260	0
Albert Belle	9	23	1	4	0	0	1	3	.174	0
Tom Brookens	64	154	18	41	7	2	1	20	.266	0
Jerry Browne	140	513	92	137	26	5	6	50	.267	12
Alex Cole	63	227	43	68	5	4	0	13	.300	40
Felix Fermin	148	414	47	106	13	2	1	40	.256	3
Keith Hernandez	43	130	7	26	2	0	1	8	.200	0
Brook Jacoby	155	553	77	162	24	4	14	75	.293	1
Chris James	140	528	62	158	32	4	12	70	.299	4
Dion James	87	248	28	68	15	2	1	22	.274	5
Stan Jefferson	49	98	21	27	8	0	2	10	.276	8
Candy Maldonado	155	590	76	161	32	2	22	95	.273	3
Jeff Manto	30	76	12	17	5	1	2	14	.224	0
Mark McLemore	8	12	2	2	0	0	0	0	.167	0
Ken Phelps	24	61	4	7	0	0	0	0	.115	1
Rafael Santana	7	13	3	3	0	0	1	3	.231	0
Joel Skinner	49	139	16	35	4	1	2	16	.252	0
Cory Snyder	123	438	46	102	27	3	14	55	.233	1
Steve Springer	4	12	1	2	0	0	0	1	.167	0
Turner Ward	14	46	10	16	2	1	1	10	.348	3
Mitch Webster	128	437	58	110	20	6	12	55	.252	22
Team totals	162	5485	732	1465	266	41	110	675	.267	107

=== Pitching ===
Note: W = Wins; L = Losses; ERA = Earned run average; G = Games pitched; GS = Games started; SV = Saves; IP = Innings pitched; H = Hits allowed; R = Runs allowed; ER = Earned runs allowed; BB = Walks allowed; K = Strikeouts

Player	W	L	ERA	G	GS	SV	IP	H	R	ER	BB	K
Kevin Bearse	0	2	12.91	3	3	0	7.2	16	11	11	5	2
Bud Black	11	10	3.53	29	29	0	191.0	171	79	75	58	103
Tom Candiotti	15	11	3.65	31	29	0	202.0	207	92	82	55	128
John Farrell	4	5	4.28	17	17	0	96.2	108	49	46	33	44
Mauro Gozzo	0	0	0.00	2	0	0	3.0	2	0	0	2	2
Cecilio Guante	2	3	5.01	26	1	0	46.2	38	26	26	18	30
Doug Jones	5	5	2.56	66	0	43	84.1	66	26	24	22	55
Jeff Kaiser	0	0	3.55	5	0	0	12.2	16	5	5	7	9
Charles Nagy	2	4	5.91	9	8	0	45.2	58	31	30	21	26
Rod Nichols	0	3	7.88	4	2	0	16.0	24	14	14	6	3
Al Nipper	2	3	6.75	9	5	0	24.0	35	19	18	19	12
Steve Olin	4	4	3.41	50	1	1	92.1	96	41	35	26	64
Jesse Orosco	5	4	3.90	55	0	2	64.2	58	35	28	38	55
Rudy Seanez	2	1	5.60	24	0	0	27.1	22	17	17	25	24
Jeff Shaw	3	4	6.66	12	9	0	48.2	73	38	36	20	25
Greg Swindell	12	9	4.40	34	34	0	214.2	245	110	105	47	135
Efrain Valdez	1	1	3.04	13	0	0	23.2	20	10	8	14	13
Sergio Valdez	6	6	4.75	24	13	0	102.1	109	62	54	35	63
Mike Walker	2	6	4.88	18	11	0	75.2	82	49	41	42	34
Colby Ward	1	3	4.25	22	0	1	36.0	31	17	17	21	23
Kevin Wickander	0	1	3.65	10	0	0	12.1	14	6	5	4	10
Team totals	77	85	4.26	162	162	47	1427.1	1491	737	676	518	860

== Awards and honors ==
- Sandy Alomar, American League Rookie of the Year, Gold Glove

All-Star Game

- Sandy Alomar, catcher, starter
- Brook Jacoby, third base, reserve
- Doug Jones, relief pitcher, reserve

== Farm system ==
Level	Team	League	Manager
AAA	Colorado Springs Sky Sox	Pacific Coast League	Bob Molinaro and Charlie Manuel
AA	Canton–Akron Indians	Eastern League	Ken Bolek
A	Kinston Indians	Carolina League	Brian Graham
A-Short Season	Watertown Indians	New York–Penn League	Jim Gabella
Rookie	Burlington Indians	Appalachian League	Dave Keller
Rookie	GCL Indians	Gulf Coast League	Dean Treanor
