= Tom Magrann =

American baseball player (born 1963)

- Catcher
- Born: December 9, 1963 (age 62); Hollywood, Florida
- Batted: Right Threw: Right

MLB debut
- September 7, 1989, for the Cleveland Indians

Last MLB appearance
- October 1, 1989, for the Cleveland Indians

MLB statistics
- Batting average: .000
- Games played: 9
- Stats at Baseball Reference

Teams
- Cleveland Indians (1989)

Thomas Joseph Magrann (born December 9, 1963) is an American former Major League Baseball player. A catcher, Magrann played for the Cleveland Indians in 1989.

== Baseball career ==
Magrann graduated from South Broward High School in Hollywood, Florida in 1981 and went on to play college baseball at Broward Community College. He was undrafted out of Broward and began his professional baseball career in 1983 with the Helena Phillies. In 1985, Mangram appeared in ten games as a pitcher for the Peninsula Pilots. In 1987, Magrann broke his leg in a collision at home plate. While recovering from the injury, he was supplanted in the Baltimore Orioles' organizational depth chart by catcher Mickey Tettleton who received a promotion to the majors in his place. He was subsequently traded in 1989 to the Cleveland Indians.

Magrann made his Major League debut on September 7, 1989 at Cleveland Stadium against the Toronto Blue Jays. He was hitless in his only at bat as a pinch hitter for catcher Andy Allanson. Magrann appeared in a total of nine game with the Indians and failed to reach base in ten at bats. On September 30, he threw Dave Gallagher out as he tried to steal second base; it was the only runner that Magrann caught stealing in his brief Major League career. Magrann wore the uniform number 76 in his brief stint with the Indians and, as of 2020, is the only Indians player to have done so. Before the 1990 season, the Indians traded for star rookie catcher Sandy Alomar Jr., effectively dashing Magrann's hopes of any significant playing time with the organization.

The 1991 season was Magrann's final in affiliated baseball. He began the year in the Pittsburgh Pirates organization. He was playing for the Buffalo Bisons when the Pirates released him midseason. He subsequently joined the Boston Red Sox farm system.

In 1992, Magrann played professional baseball in Braschaat, Belgium where he hit 18 home runs in 15 games.

In April 2016, Magrann became the head baseball coach at Coral Springs Charter School in Coral Springs, Florida.

== Personal life ==
Magrann's father, also named Thomas, was of Irish descent and met Magrann's mother, Joanne, while he was studying to enter the Catholic priesthood and she was a church organist. Magrann is one of their four children.

Magrann married Christine Margaret Dart on July 23, 1994 at Nativity Lutheran Church in Spring Hill, Florida. At the time, he was employed by the fire department in Deerfield Beach, Florida.

As of September 2005, he was a firefighter-paramedic in Deerfield Beach but living in Coconut Creek, Florida.
