= Tommy Hinzo =

American baseball player (born 1964)

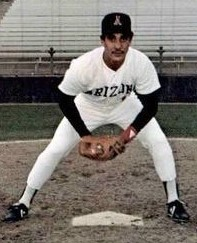
- Second baseman
- Born: June 18, 1964 (age 61); San Diego, California, U.S.
- Batted: Both Threw: Right

MLB debut
- July 16, 1987, for the Cleveland Indians

Last MLB appearance
- October 1, 1989, for the Cleveland Indians

MLB statistics
- Batting average: .248
- Home runs: 3
- Runs batted in: 21

CPBL statistics
- Batting average: .177
- Home runs: 0
- Runs batted in: 2
- Stats at Baseball Reference

Teams
- Cleveland Indians (1987, 1989); Wei Chuan Dragons (1996)

Thomas Lee Hinzo (born June 18, 1964) is an American former professional baseball second baseman who played for two seasons. He played for the Cleveland Indians of the Major League Baseball (MLB) for 67 games during the 1987 Cleveland Indians season and 18 games during the 1989 Cleveland Indians season.

Hinzo attended Southwestern College and later the University of Arizona, and in 1984 he played collegiate summer baseball with the Harwich Mariners of the Cape Cod Baseball League. At Arizona, he had 45 stolen bases, a school record at the time, and won the College World Series a member of the 1986 Arizona Wildcats baseball team.

He was selected by the Indians in the 7th round of the 1986 Major League Baseball draft. He began his professional career with the Batavia Trojans, where he had a .333 batting average and 24 stolen bases in 55 games. The following year, Hinzo was promoted to the Kinston Indians, where he had a .278 batting average and 49 stolen bases in 65 games. He was promoted in June to the Double-A Williamsport Bills, and played in 26 games for them. On July 15, the Cleveland Indians traded Tony Bernazard for Darrel Akerfelds and Brian Dorsett. This left an opening at second base, and as a result the Indians promoted Hinzo to the major leagues. He played the rest of the season in the majors, hitting .265 in 67 games.

Entering the 1988 season, the Indians planned to move Julio Franco from shortstop to second baseman. Due to the position change and wanting Hinzo to play every day, the Indians demoted him to the Triple-A Colorado Springs Sky Sox for the 1988 season. Hinzo spent the full 1988 season with the Sky Sox, hitting .232 in 119 games. He remained with the Sky Sox for most of 1989, hitting .254 in 102 games. After an injury to Jerry Browne in August, Hinzo was promoted back to the major league roster. Hinzo spent the rest of the season with the Indians, mostly as a defensive replacement, and went hitless in 18 games.

Hinzo spent 1990 on four different teams for the Atlanta Braves and Kansas City Royals organizations. He then spent 1991 and 1992 with Leones de Yucatan of the Mexican Baseball League. He returned to the minor leagues in 1993 and played in 127 games for the Rochester Red Wings, the Baltimore Orioles' Triple-A affiliate. He spent two more seasons playing Triple-A baseball before ending his career in 1996 with another stint with Yucatan, as well as the Wei Chuan Dragons of the Chinese Professional Baseball League.
