= Joe Skalski =

American baseball player (born 1964)

- Pitcher
- Born: September 26, 1964 (age 61); Burnham, Illinois, U.S.
- Batted: Right Threw: Right

MLB debut
- April 10, 1989, for the Cleveland Indians

Last MLB appearance
- April 14, 1989, for the Cleveland Indians

MLB statistics
- Games pitched: 2
- Win–loss record: 0–2
- Earned run average: 6.75
- Strikeouts: 3
- Stats at Baseball Reference

Teams
- Cleveland Indians (1989)

Joseph Douglas Skalski (born September 26, 1964) is an American former Major League Baseball pitcher. He appeared in just two games for the Cleveland Indians, pitching 6 2/3 innings. He was the losing pitcher in both of his games.

Joe attended Saint Xavier University and was drafted by the Cleveland Indians in the 3rd round of the 1986 amateur draft. He pitched in the Indians organization until 1990.
