= Buffalo Bisons =

Minor League Baseball (AAA) team in Buffalo, New York

- Founded in 1979; Buffalo, New York

Team logo	Cap insignia

Minor league affiliations
- Class: Triple-A (1985–present)
- Previous classes: Double-A (1979–1984)
- League: International League (1998–present)
- Division: East Division
- Previous leagues: American Association (1985–1997); Eastern League (1979–1984)

Major league affiliations
- Team: Toronto Blue Jays (2013–present)
- Previous teams: New York Mets (2009–2012); Cleveland Indians (1995–2008); Pittsburgh Pirates (1988–1994); Cleveland Indians (1987); Chicago White Sox (1985–1986); Cleveland Indians (1983–1984); Pittsburgh Pirates (1979–1982)

Minor league titles
- League titles (3): 1997; 1998; 2004
- Division titles (10): 1991; 1992; 1996; 1997; 1998; 2000; 2001; 2004; 2005; 2021
- Wild card berths (1): 2002

Team data
- Name: Buffalo Bisons (1979–present)
- Colors: Scarlet red, reflex blue, white
- Mascot: Buster T. Bison
- Ballpark: Sahlen Field (1988–present)
- Previous parks: Trenton Thunder Ballpark (2021); War Memorial Stadium (1979–1987)
- Owner/ Operator: Robert E. Rich Jr.
- President: Mike Buczkowski
- General manager: Anthony Sprague
- Manager: Casey Candaele
- Media: Radio: WWKB; Streaming: MiLB.TV and Bally Live; TV: WNYO (select games)
- Website: mlb.com/milb/buffalo

The Buffalo Bisons (known colloquially as the Herd) are a Minor League Baseball team of the International League and the Triple-A affiliate of the Toronto Blue Jays. Located in Buffalo, New York, the team plays their home games at Sahlen Field, the highest-capacity Triple-A ballpark in the United States.

The current Bisons organization was founded in 1979 and assumed the history of previous franchises that also used the Buffalo Bisons name, most notably the 1886–1970 Buffalo Bisons minor league franchise, and the 1879–1885 Buffalo Bisons major league franchise. The team established the Buffalo Baseball Hall of Fame in 1985 to honor former players, managers and contributors to baseball in Buffalo.

The team holds the all-time record for single-season attendance in Minor League Baseball, selling 1,240,951 tickets in 1991 while being considered for 1993 Major League Baseball expansion. Forbes valued the Buffalo Bisons at $34 million in 2016, making it the 15th-most valuable Minor League Baseball franchise.

== History ==
Mayor James D. Griffin and an investment group purchased the Jersey City A's of the Double-A class Eastern League for $55,000 in 1978, and the team began play as the Buffalo Bisons at War Memorial Stadium in 1979. This new franchise assumed the history of prior Buffalo Bisons teams that had played in the city from 1877 to 1970. Robert E. Rich Jr. purchased the Bisons for $100,000 in 1983, and upgraded the team to the Triple-A class American Association in 1985 after buying out the Wichita Aeros for $1 million. Rich Jr. grew the team's popularity and was known for his innovative promotional tie-ins, most notably an annual series of post-game concerts by The Beach Boys.

The Buffalo Bisons moved to the $42.4 million Pilot Field (now Sahlen Field) in downtown Buffalo in the 1988 season. In their first year at the venue after moving from War Memorial Stadium, the Bisons broke the all-time record for Minor League Baseball attendance by drawing 1,186,651 fans during the 1988 season. The team won two division titles and set subsequent attendance records on the heels of their unsuccessful 1993 Major League Baseball expansion bid. The team's 1991 single-season attendance of 1,240,951 remains a Minor League Baseball record.

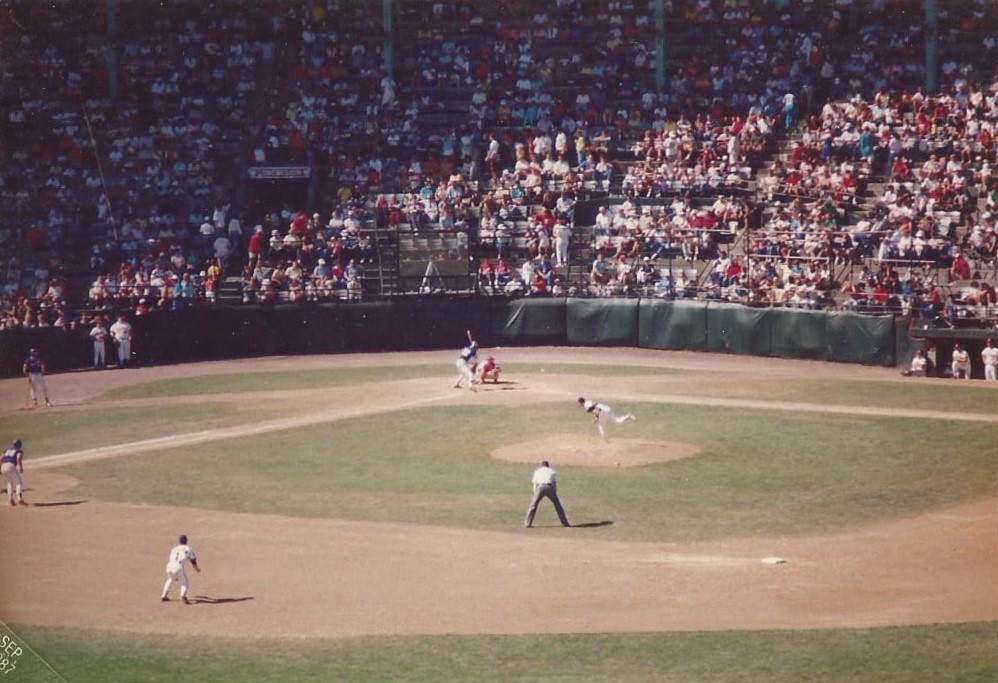
Buffalo Bisons hosting Nashville Sounds for their final game at War Memorial Stadium, August 30, 1987

The Cleveland Indians replaced the Pittsburgh Pirates as Major League Baseball affiliate of the Buffalo Bisons prior to the 1995 season. The team won division titles in 1996 and 1997, and won the final American Association championship in 1997. Bartolo Colón threw the first no-hitter in franchise history on June 20, 1997 against the New Orleans Zephyrs.

In wake of the American Association disbanding following the 1997 season, the Bisons joined the International League in 1998. The team won the division and league championship in their first season, but lost the Triple-A World Series. The addition of regional rivalries allowed for the creation of the Thruway Cup, an annual competition between the Buffalo Bisons, Rochester Red Wings and Syracuse SkyChiefs. The Bisons went on to win division titles in 2000, 2001, 2004, 2005, and the league championship at home in 2004.

The New York Mets replaced the Cleveland Indians as Major League Baseball affiliate of the Buffalo Bisons prior to the 2009 season. This era was plagued with poor on-field performance and low attendance.

Sahlen Field, home of the Buffalo Bisons since 1988

The Toronto Blue Jays replaced the New York Mets as Major League Baseball affiliate of the Buffalo Bisons prior to the 2013 season. To kick off this era, the Bisons scored 27 runs on 29 hits against the Syracuse Chiefs on April 18, 2013, setting records for the most runs and hits in an International League game since 1973. The Blue Jays used Sahlen Field as their home field in 2020 after the Bisons season was cancelled due to the COVID-19 pandemic, investing $5 million in upgrading the venue.

In conjunction with Major League Baseball's restructuring of Minor League Baseball and the closure of the International League, the Bisons joined the newly formed Triple-A East in 2021. Due to renovations at Sahlen Field as well as use of the stadium by the Blue Jays, the Bisons began their 2021 season at Trenton Thunder Ballpark in Trenton, New Jersey. At their home games, they wore the uniforms of the Trenton Thunder and were referred to as such, while on the road they were still known as the Buffalo Bisons.

With the reinstatement of the historical league names in 2022, the Bisons were returned to the International League.

== Roster ==
Buffalo Bisons roster
Players		Coaches/Other
Pitchers: 37 Javen Coleman; -- Nic Enright; 35 Lázaro Estrada; 12 Pat Gallagher; 28 Richard Gallardo; 54 Sam Gardner; 58 Daniel Guerra; 37 Devereaux Harrison; 39 Yariel Rodríguez; 10 Grant Rogers; 50 Yondrei Rojas; 31 Gage Stanifer; 21 Josh Stephan; -- Trenton Wallace; 32 Josh Winckowski	Catchers Infielders: 45 Nick Goodwin; 7 Jay Harry; 4 Josh Kasevich; 24 Josh Rivera; 34 Peyton Williams; Outfielders: 5 RJ Schreck	Manager: 11 Casey Candaele; Coaches: 41 Trevor Cho (assistant hitting); 87 Drew Hayes (pitching); 77 Henry Leake (assistant pitching); 14 Cesar Martin (bench); 81 Chris Schaeffer (coach); 95 Matt Young (hitting); 7-day injured list; * On Toronto Blue Jays 40-man roster; ~ Development list; # Rehab assignment; ∞ Reserve list; ‡ Restricted list; § Suspended list; † Temporarily inactive list; Roster updated November 5, 2026; Transactions; → More rosters: MiLB • International League; → Toronto Blue Jays minor league players

== Alumni and awards ==
=== Awards ===
The franchise has been awarded the following honors by Minor League Baseball:

Minor League Baseball Awards
Award	Season	Ref.
Larry MacPhail Award	1989	
John H. Johnson President's Award	1992	

==== Eastern League ====
These players and team personnel won Eastern League year-end awards during the club's membership from 1979 to 1984.

Eastern League awards
Award	Recipient	Season	Ref.
Most Valuable Player	Rick Lancelloti	1979	

==== American Association ====
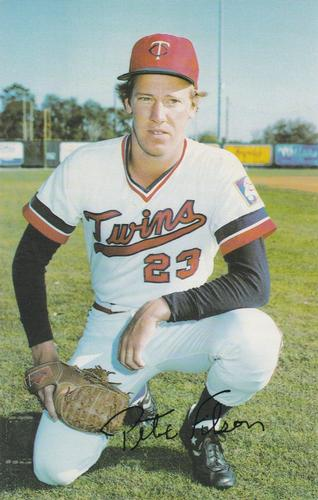
Pete Filson, 1986 American Association Most Valuable Pitcher

These players and team personnel won American Association year-end awards during the club's membership from 1985 to 1997.

American Association awards
Award	Recipient	Season	Ref.
Most Valuable Pitcher	Pete Filson	1986	
Most Valuable Pitcher	Rick Reed	1991	
Most Valuable Pitcher	Roy Smith	1993	
Most Valuable Pitcher	Eric Bell	1995	
Rookie of the Year	Kevin Young	1992	
Manager of the Year	Marc Bombard	1992	
Executive of the Year	Bob Rich Jr.	1986	
Executive of the Year	Bob Rich Jr. (2)	1988	
Executive of the Year	Bob Rich Jr. (3)	1991	

==== International League ====
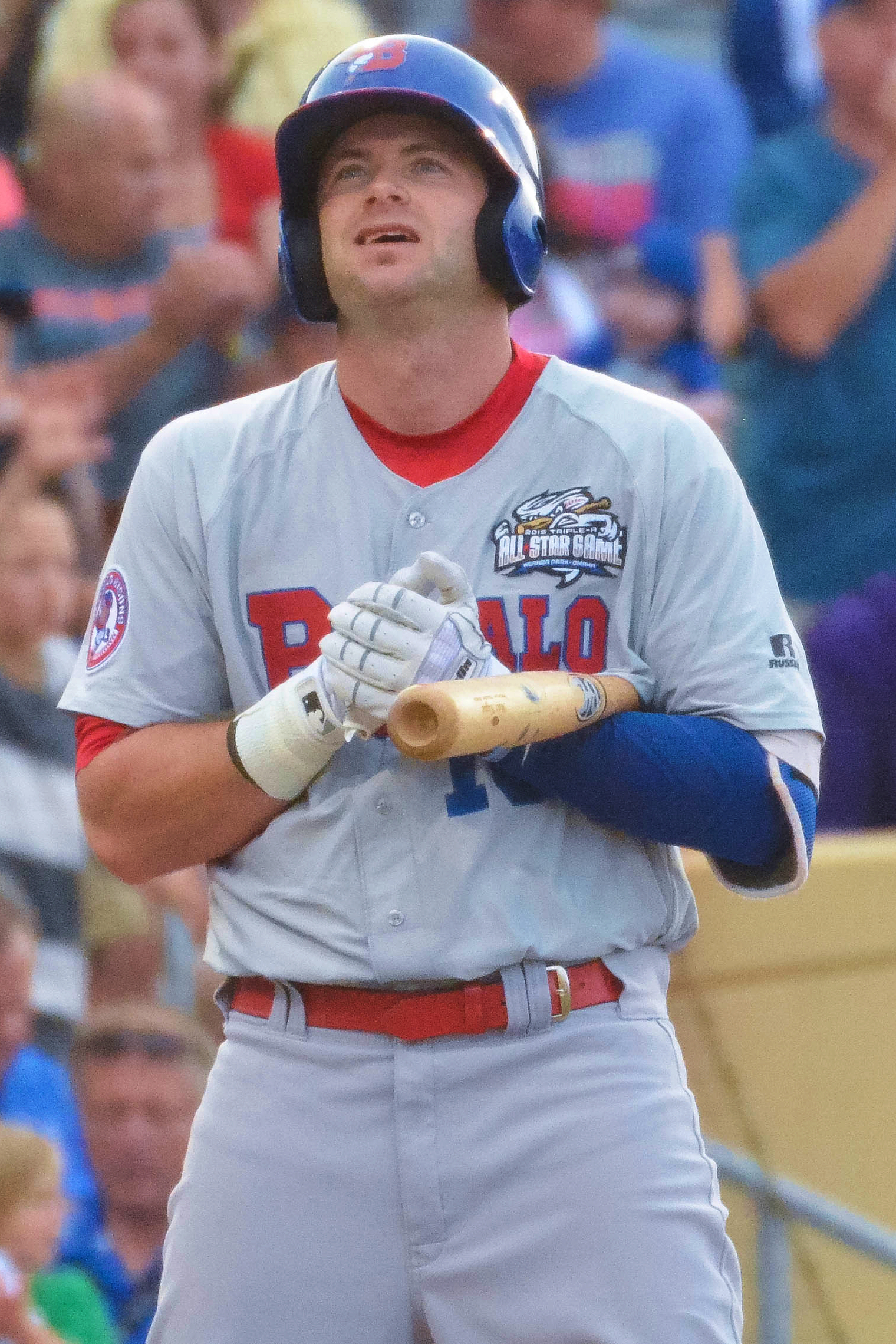
Matt Hague, 2015 International League Most Valuable Player

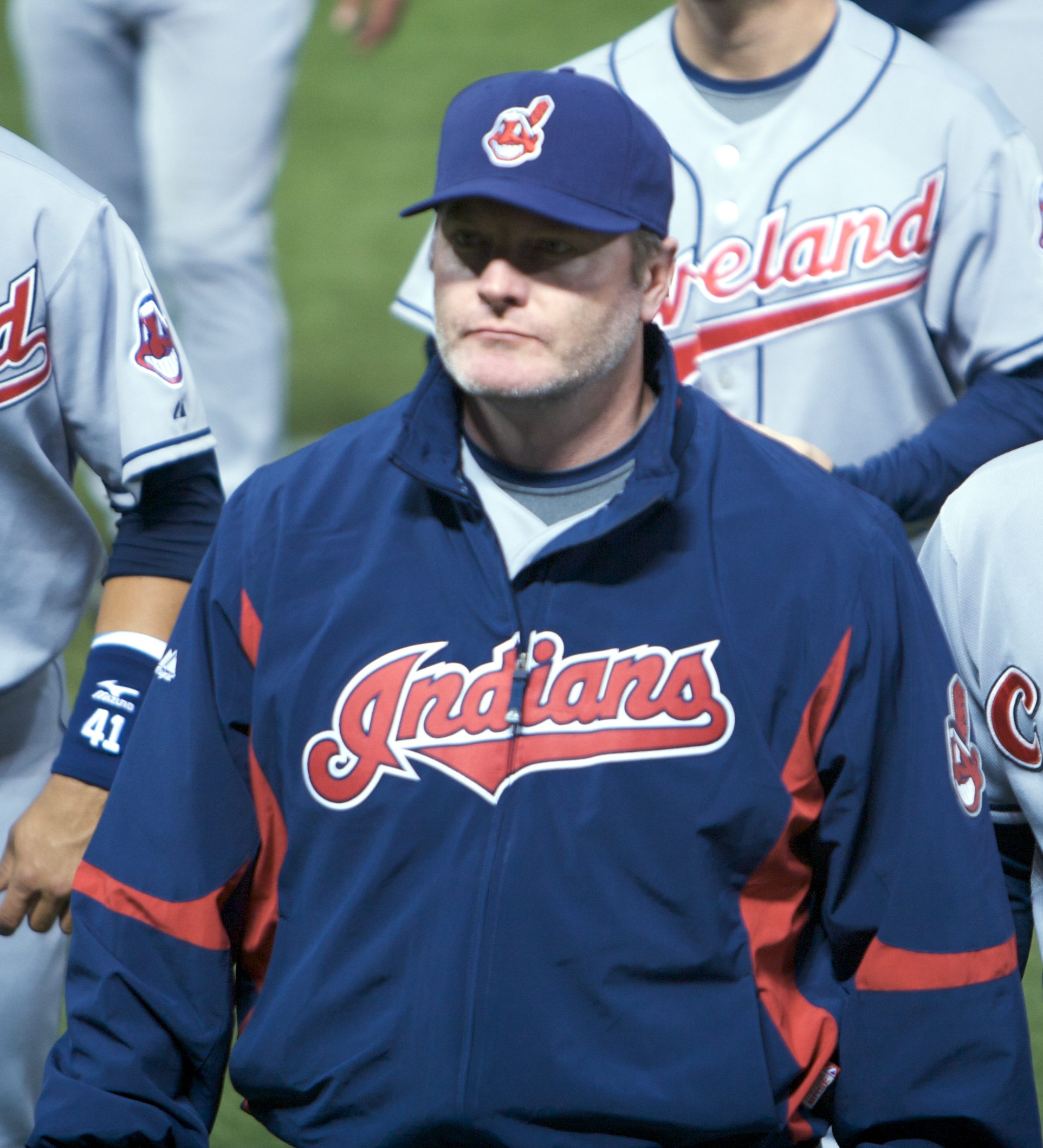
Eric Wedge, 2001 International League Manager of the Year

These players and team personnel have won International League year-end awards during the club's membership since 1998.

International League awards
Award	Recipient	Season	Ref.
Most Valuable Player	Jhonny Peralta	2004	
Most Valuable Player	Matt Hague	2015	
Manager of the Year	Joel Skinner	2000	
Manager of the Year	Eric Wedge	2001	
Manager of the Year	Marty Brown	2004	
Manager of the Year	Casey Candaele	2021	
Executive of the Year	Mike Buczkowski	2019	

=== Retired numbers ===
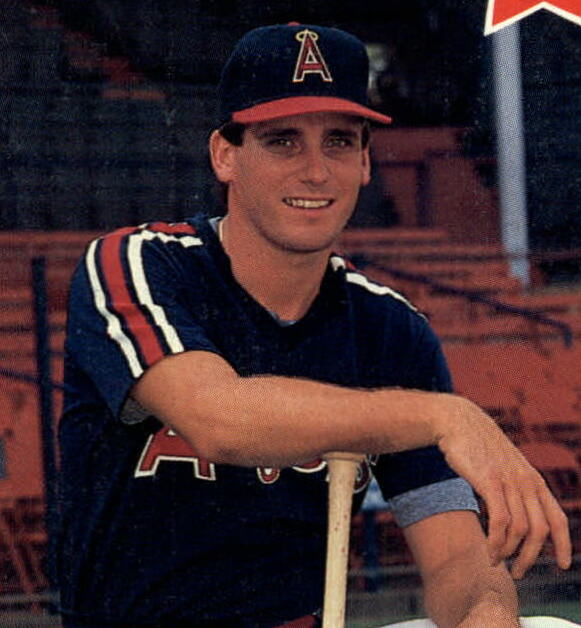
Jeff Manto played for the Bisons from 1997 to 2000, hitting 79 home runs over four seasons. His number 30 was retired by the Bisons on August 17, 2001.

Number	Player	Retirement Date
6	Ollie Carnegie	
25	Luke Easter	
30	Jeff Manto	August 17, 2001
42	Jackie Robinson	April 15, 1997

=== National Baseball Hall of Fame members ===
Player/Manager	Year Inducted	Years with the Bisons
Jim Thome	2018	1998
CC Sabathia	2025	2006

=== International League Hall of Fame members ===
Player/Manager	Year Inducted	Years with the Bisons
Jeff Manto	2014	1997–2000
Marc Bombard	2015	1992 (Manager)
Mike Hessman	2018	2010

=== Buffalo Baseball Hall of Fame members ===
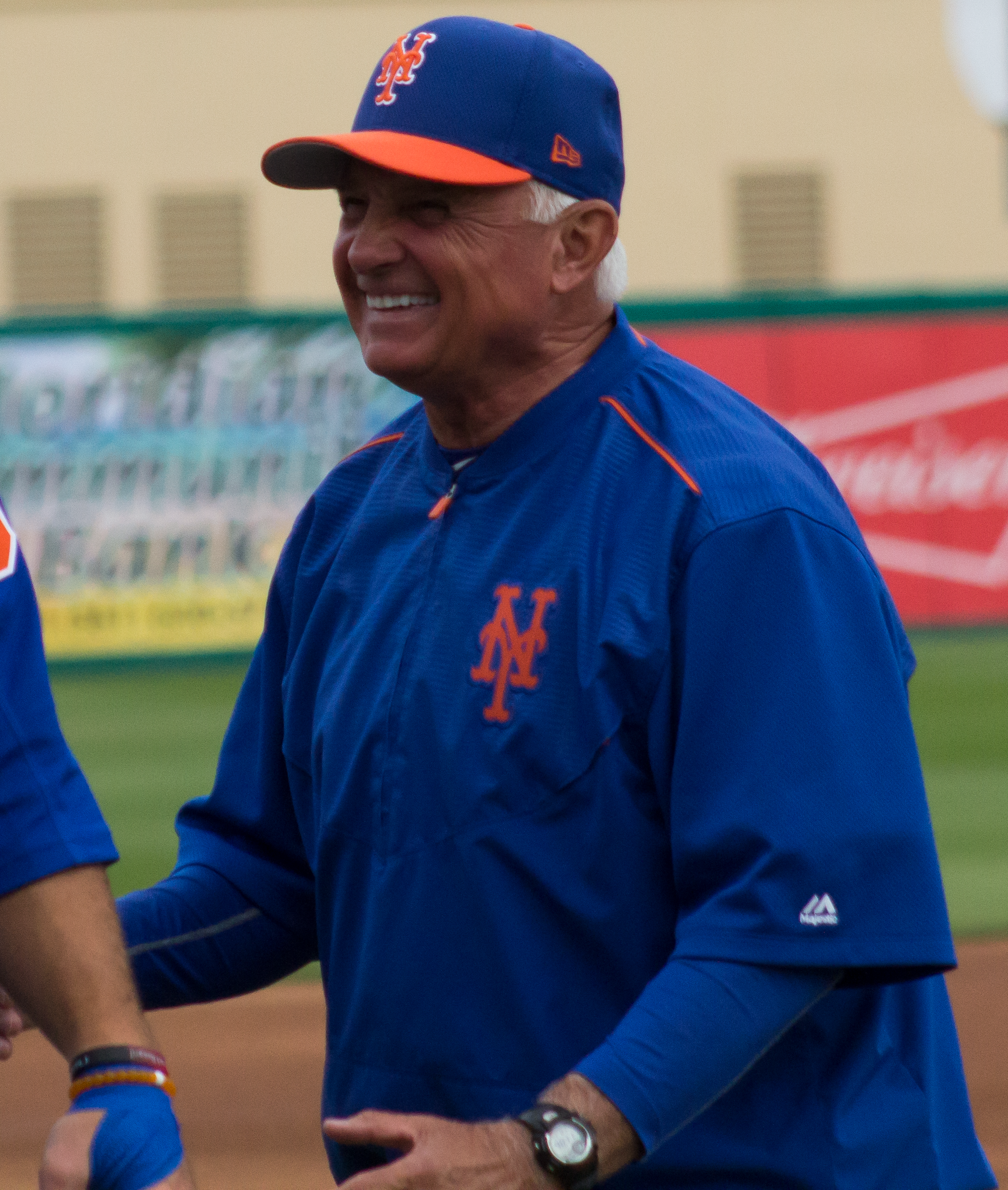
Terry Collins managed the Bisons to their first division title in 1991.

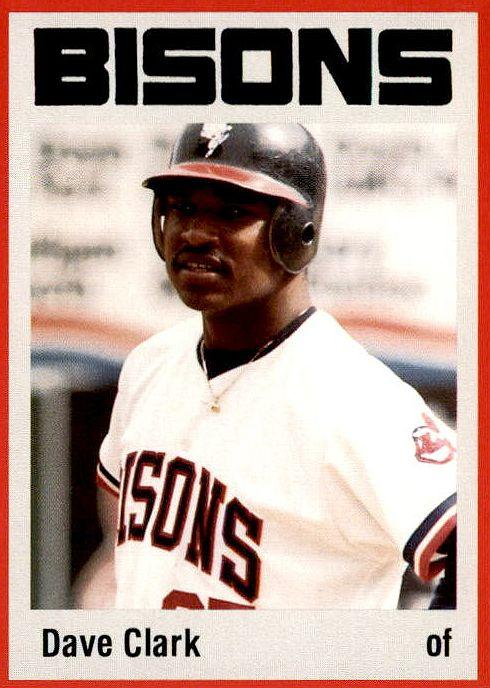
Dave Clark played in parts of three seasons with the Bisons, most notably hitting 30 home runs in the 1987 season.

Player/Manager	Year Inducted	Years with the Bisons
Terry Collins	1992	1989–1991 (Manager)
Joe DeSa	1992	1985–1986
Rick Lancellotti	1995	1979–1980
Steve Farr	1996	1980–1983
Dorn Taylor	1998	1988–1990
Torey Lovullo	2003	1995, 1997–1998
Jeff Manto	2003	1997–2000
Tom Prince	2004	1988–1992
Rick Reed	2006	1988–1991
Bill Selby	2007	1998–2000, 2002
Dave Clark	2008	1984, 1987, 1992
Brian Graham	2008	1995–1997 (Manager)
Carlos García	2009	1990–1992
Dave Hollins	2009	2000–2001
Richie Sexson	2010	1997–1998
Tony Peña	2011	1979
Brian Giles	2012	1995–1996, 1998
Russ Morman	2012	1985–1986, 1993
Dave Roberts	2013	1998–2001
Ernie Young	2013	2004–2005
Greg Tubbs	2014	1991–1992, 1994
Eric Wedge	2014	2001–2002 (Manager)
Chris Coste	2015	2000–2002
Greg LaRocca	2015	2001–2003
Alex Ramírez	2016	1997–1999
Jason Jacome	2017	1997–1998
Mark Ryal	2017	1985, 1990
Joe Roa	2018	1995–1996
Marty Brown	2018	2003–2005, 2013 (Manager)
Ben Francisco	2022	2005–2008
Jhonny Peralta	2022	2003–2004
Bob Patterson	2022	1988–1989
Matt Hague	2023	2014–2015
Pete Filson	2023	1986
Brandon Phillips	2024	2002–2005
Brian Anderson	2025	1996–1997
Jolbert Cabrera	2025	1998–2000, 2002
Jesús Feliciano	2026	2009–2011

=== All 25 Seasons Team (2012) ===
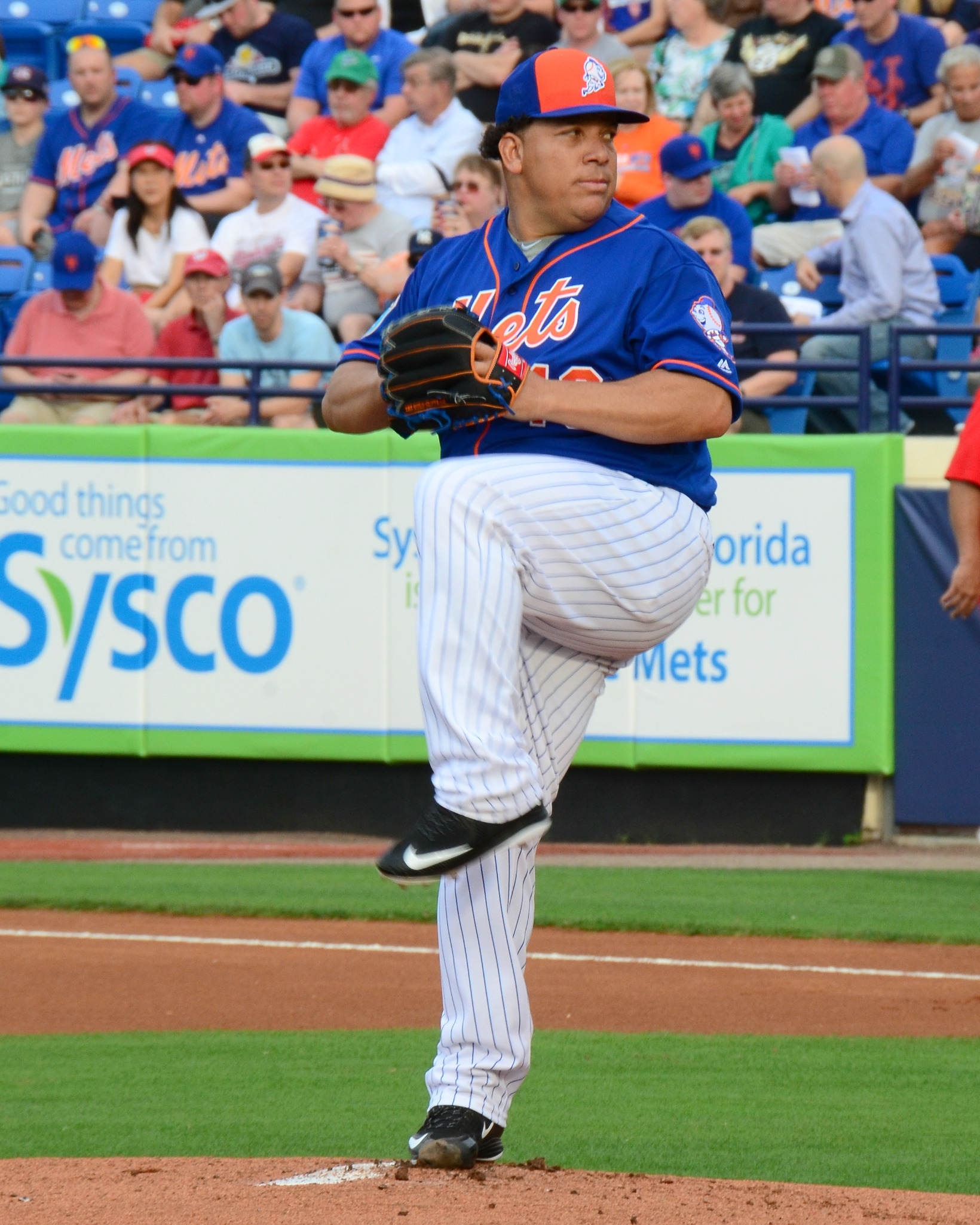
Bartolo Colón pitched the Bisons' first no-hitter on June 20, 1997.

Position	Player/Manager	Years with the Bisons
Manager	Terry Collins	1989–1991
Catcher	Tom Prince	1988–1992
First Base	Richie Sexson	1997–1998
Second Base	Brandon Phillips	2002–2005
Third Base	Russell Branyan	1999–2000, 2004, 2007
Shortstop	Jhonny Peralta	2003–2004
Outfield	Ben Francisco	2005–2008
Outfield	Brian Giles	1995–1996, 1998
Outfield	Alex Ramírez	1997–1999
Designated Hitter	Jeff Manto	1997–2000
Starting Pitcher	Bartolo Colón	1996–1997, 2000
Starting Pitcher	Rick Reed	1988–1991
Starting Pitcher	Dorn Taylor	1988–1990
Relief Pitcher	Fernando Cabrera	2004–2006, 2012
Relief Pitcher	Danny Graves	1995–1997, 2006

== Managers ==
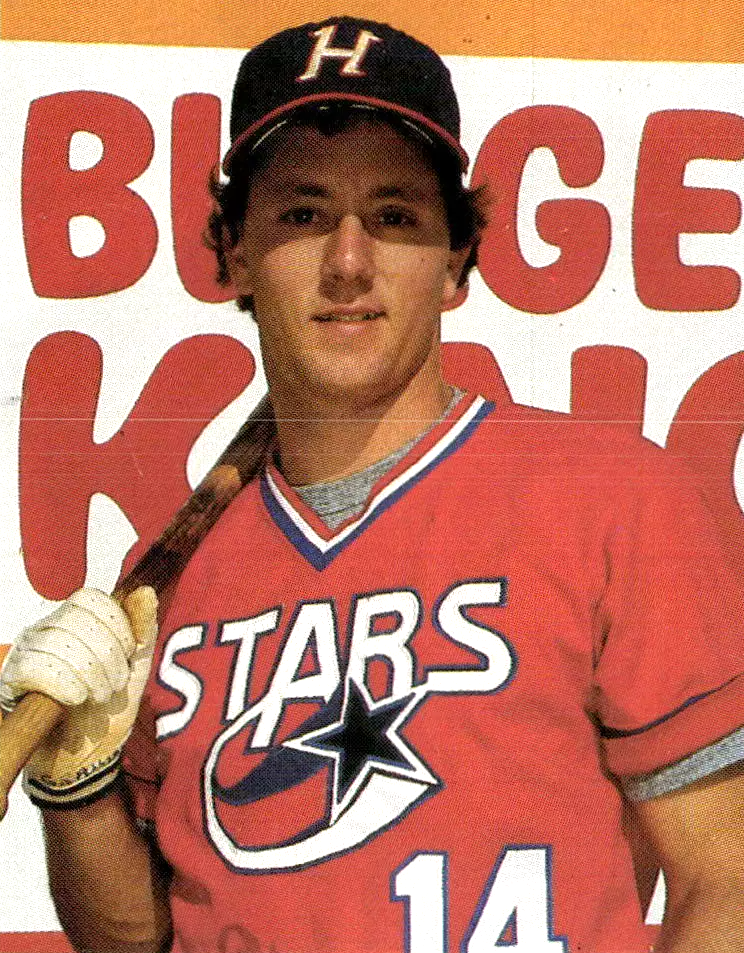
Brian Graham led the Bisons to win the final American Association championship in 1997.

No.	Manager	Season(s)
1	Steve Demeter	1979–1980
2	Johnny Lipon	1981
3	Tommy Sandt	1982
4	Al Gallagher	1983
5	Jack Aker	1984
6	John Boles	1985
7	Jim Marshall	1986
8	Orlando Gómez (Note: Gómez was replaced by Steve Swisher as manager of the Bisons on May 20, following an 11–22 start to the season.)	1987
—	Steve Swisher	1987
9	Rocky Bridges	1988
10	Terry Collins	1989–1991
11	Marc Bombard	1992
12	Doc Edwards	1993–1994
13	Brian Graham	1995–1997
14	Jeff Datz	1998–1999
15	Joel Skinner	2000
16	Eric Wedge	2001–2002
17	Marty Brown	2003–2005
18	Torey Lovullo	2006–2008
19	Ken Oberkfell	2009–2010
20	Tim Teufel	2011
21	Wally Backman	2012
—	Marty Brown	2013
22	Gary Allenson	2014–2016
23	Bobby Meacham	2017–2019
—	Ken Huckaby (Note: Ken Huckaby was hired to manage the 2020 team, but the season was cancelled due to the COVID-19 pandemic before it began.)	2020
24	Casey Candaele (Note: Casey Candaele was promoted to the Toronto Blue Jays to serve as the interim bench coach on July 13. Bisons pitching coach Jeff Ware was named as interim manager for the remainder of the season on July 29. Candaele then returned as the Bisons' manager in 2023.)	2021–2022
—	Jeff Ware	2022
—	Casey Candaele	2023–present

== Season-by-season records ==
Season-by-season records (last five seasons)
Season	League	Regular season					Postseason			MLB affiliate	Ref.
Season	League	Record	Win %	League	Division	GB	Record	Win %	Result	MLB affiliate	Ref.
2022	IL	76–72	.514	7th (tie)	4th (tie)	9	—	—	Result	—	Toronto Blue Jays
2023	IL	76–72	.514	8th	5th	13 1/2	—	—	—	Toronto Blue Jays	
2024	IL	68–80	.459	18th	10th	20 1/2	—	—	—	Toronto Blue Jays	
2025	IL	61–85	.418	19th	9th	26	—	—	—	Toronto Blue Jays	
2026	IL	68–79	.463	14th	7th	21 1/2	—	—	—	Toronto Blue Jays	
Totals	—	349–388	.474	—	—	—	—	—	—	—	—

== Radio and television ==
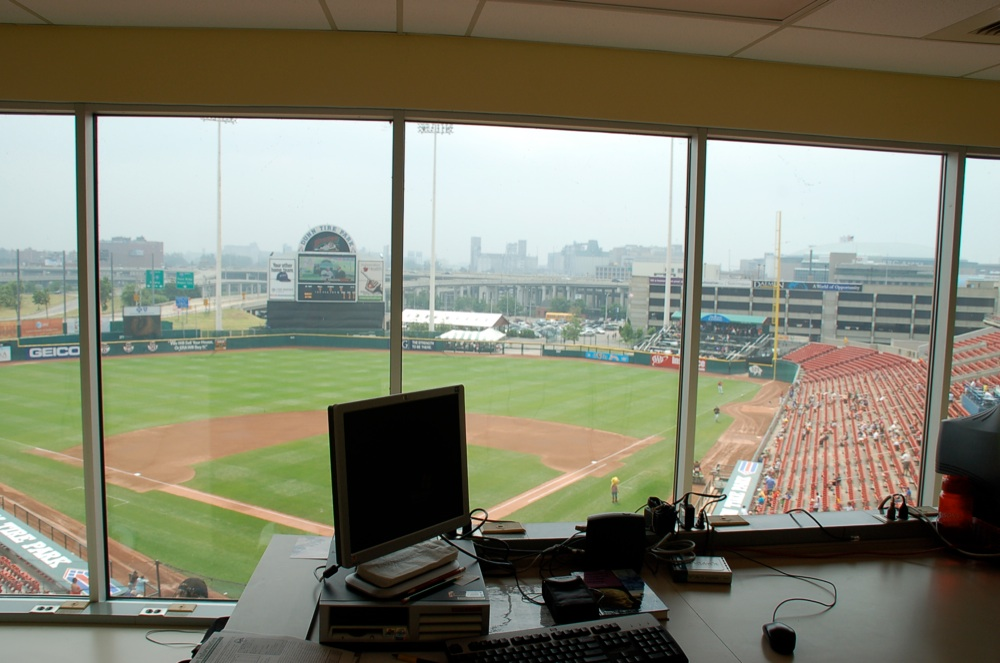
Sahlen Field press box

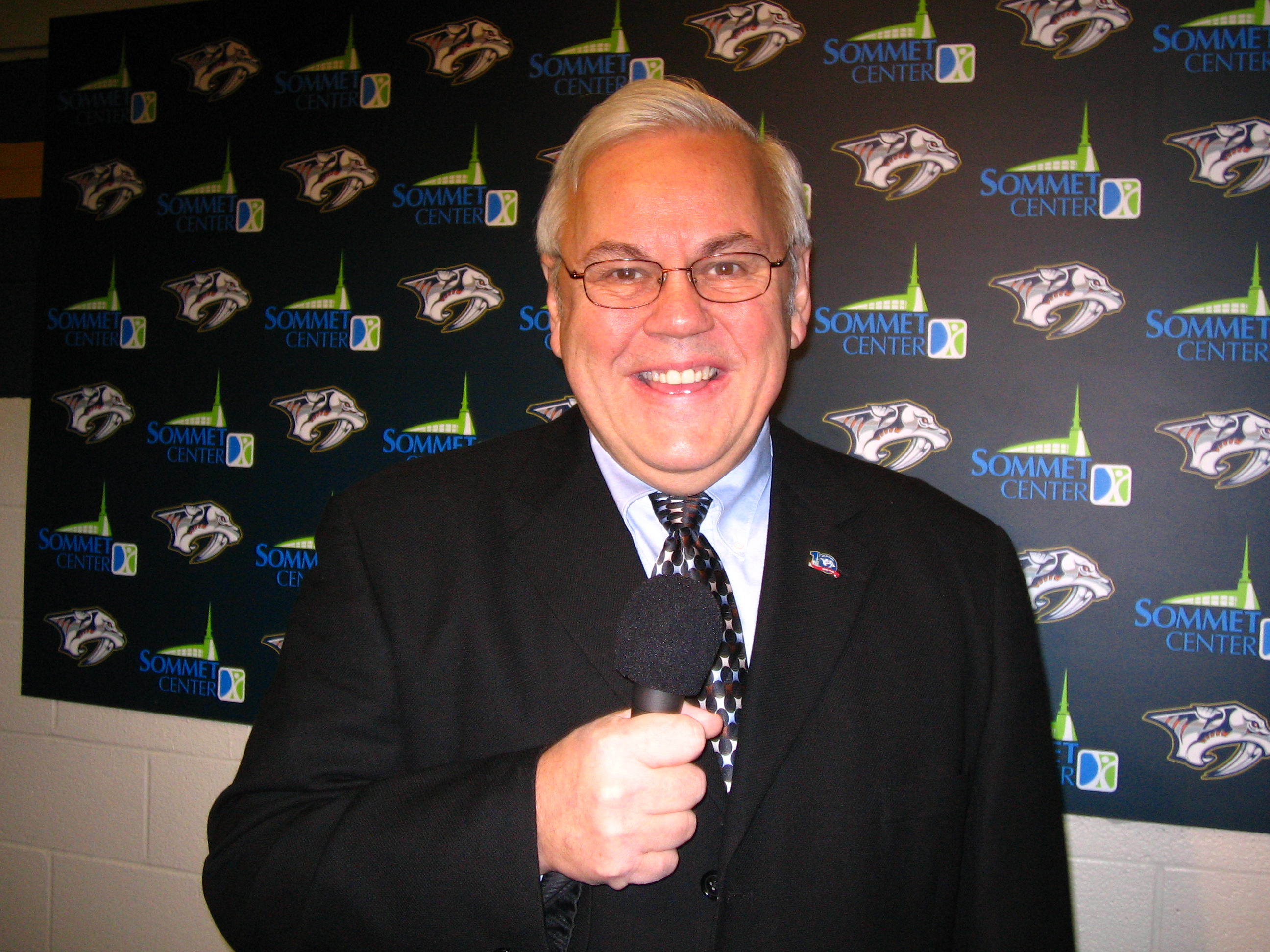
Pete Weber

Bisons Baseball Network produces all radio broadcasts of Buffalo Bisons games. Their flagship station since 2009 has been WWKB, a clear-channel station in Buffalo. Select games are simulcast on WGR in Buffalo and CJCL in Toronto. Games were previously carried by WUFO/WXRL (1983), WEBR (1984), WBEN (1985–1988) and WGR (1989–2008).

Live video streams of all Buffalo Bisons games have aired on the MiLB.TV subscription service since 2013, and free via the Bally Live app since 2023. Select games have been televised on WNYO since 2023. Games were previously televised on WNYB (1988–1989, 1996), Empire Sports Network (1991–1995, 1997–2004), Time Warner Cable SportsNet (2007–2016), Spectrum Sports (2017) and WNLO (2019–2022).

Pat Malacaro has served as the team's play-by-play announcer since 2018. Pete Weber served as play-by-play announcer from 1983 to 1995, and is the current play-by-play announcer for the Nashville Predators. Jim Rosenhaus served as play-by-play announcer from 1996 to 2006, and is the current play-by-play announcer for the Cleveland Guardians. Ben Wagner served as play-by-play announcer from 2007 to 2017, and is the current play-by-play announcer for the Baltimore Orioles, after serving 6 years as play-by-play announcer of the Toronto Blue Jays.

Duke McGuire has served as the team's color commentator since 1996, and previously worked as the team's in-stadium public address announcer from 1979 to 1995. John Murphy served as color commentator from 1985 to 1988, and is the current play-by-play announcer for the Buffalo Bills. Greg Brown served as color commentator from 1989 to 1993, and is the current play-by-play announcer for the Pittsburgh Pirates.

Weber, McGuire, Rosenhaus, and Brown were inducted into the Buffalo Baseball Hall of Fame for their broadcast work.

== Culture ==
=== Mascots ===
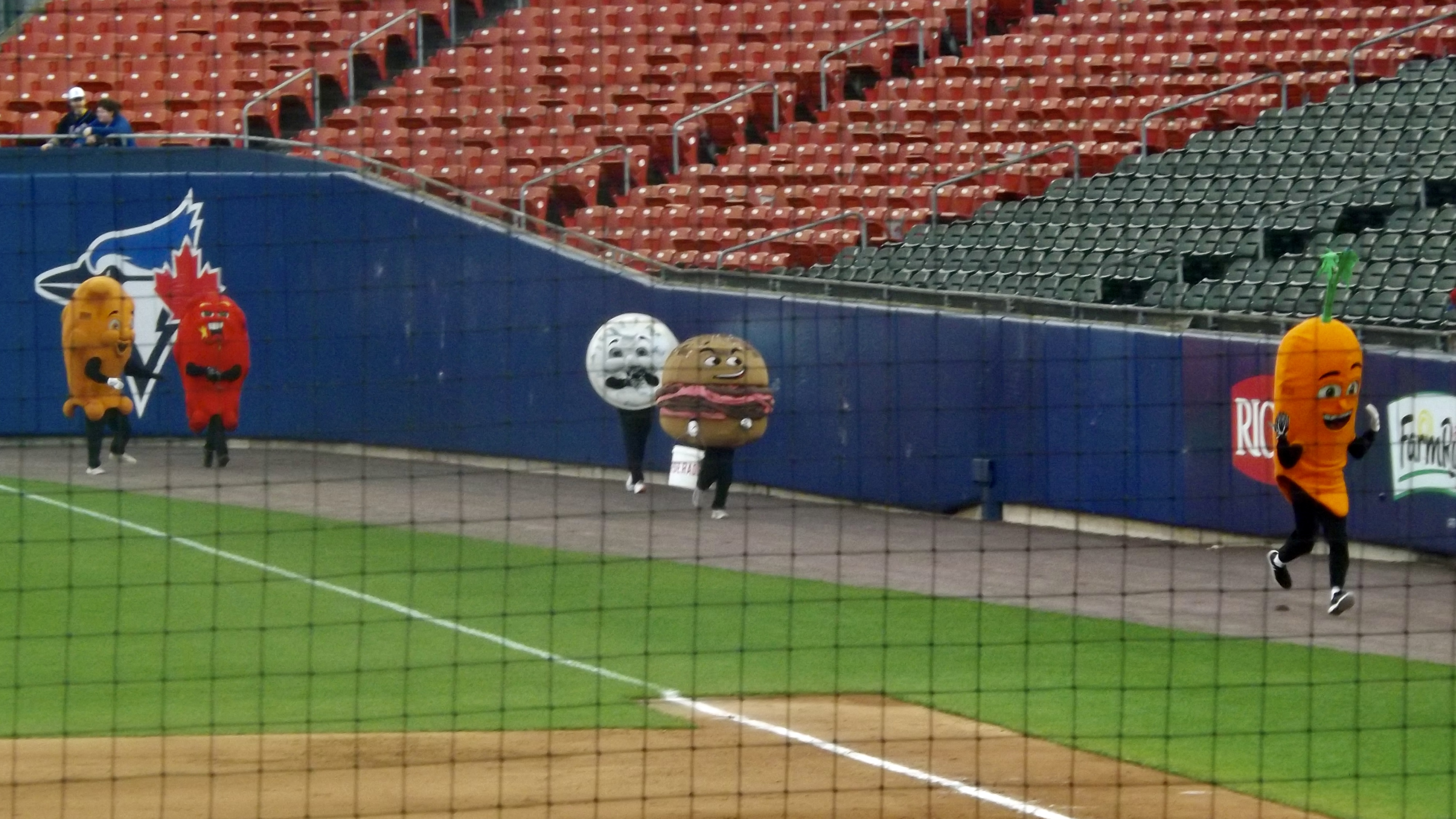
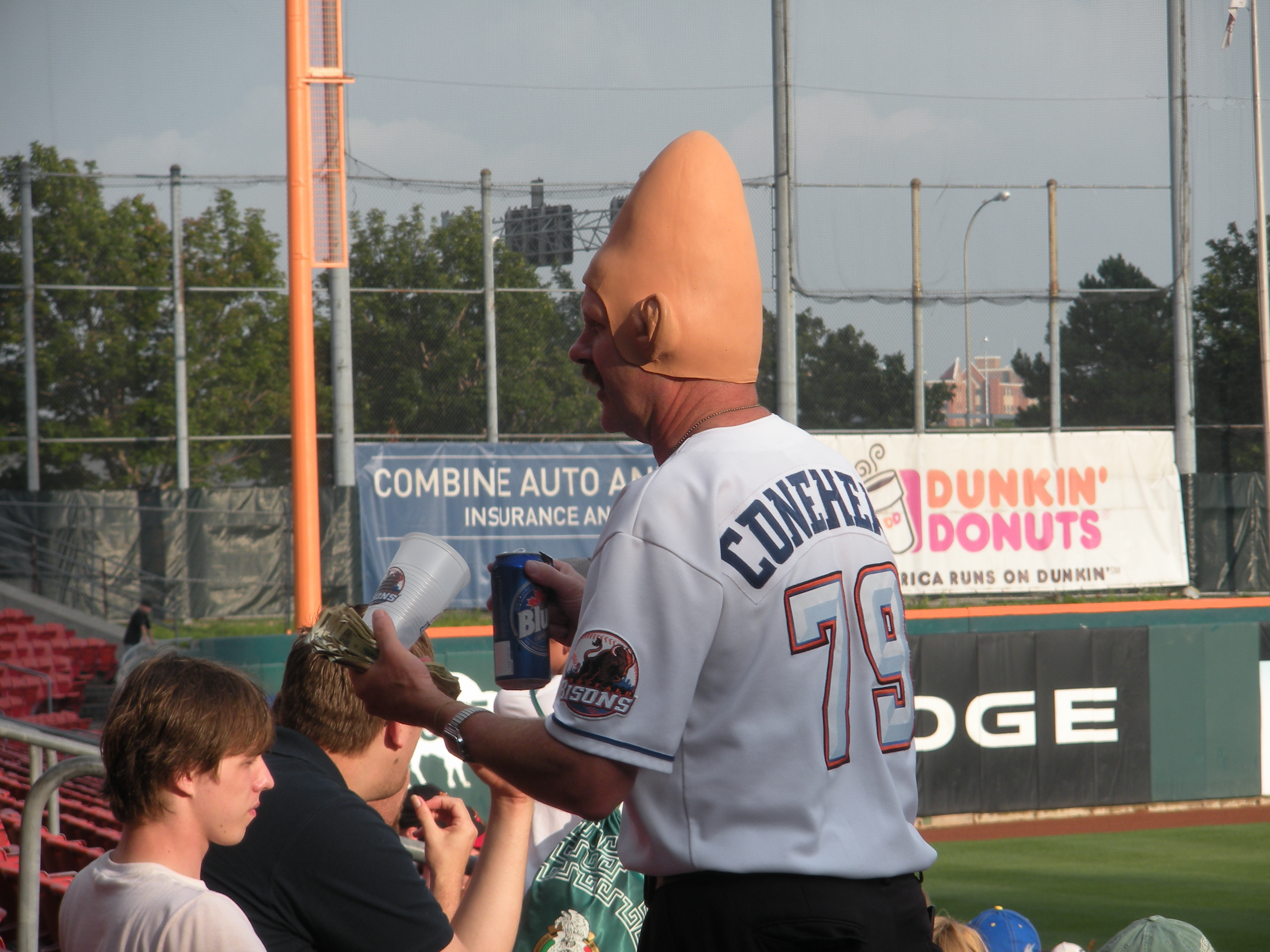
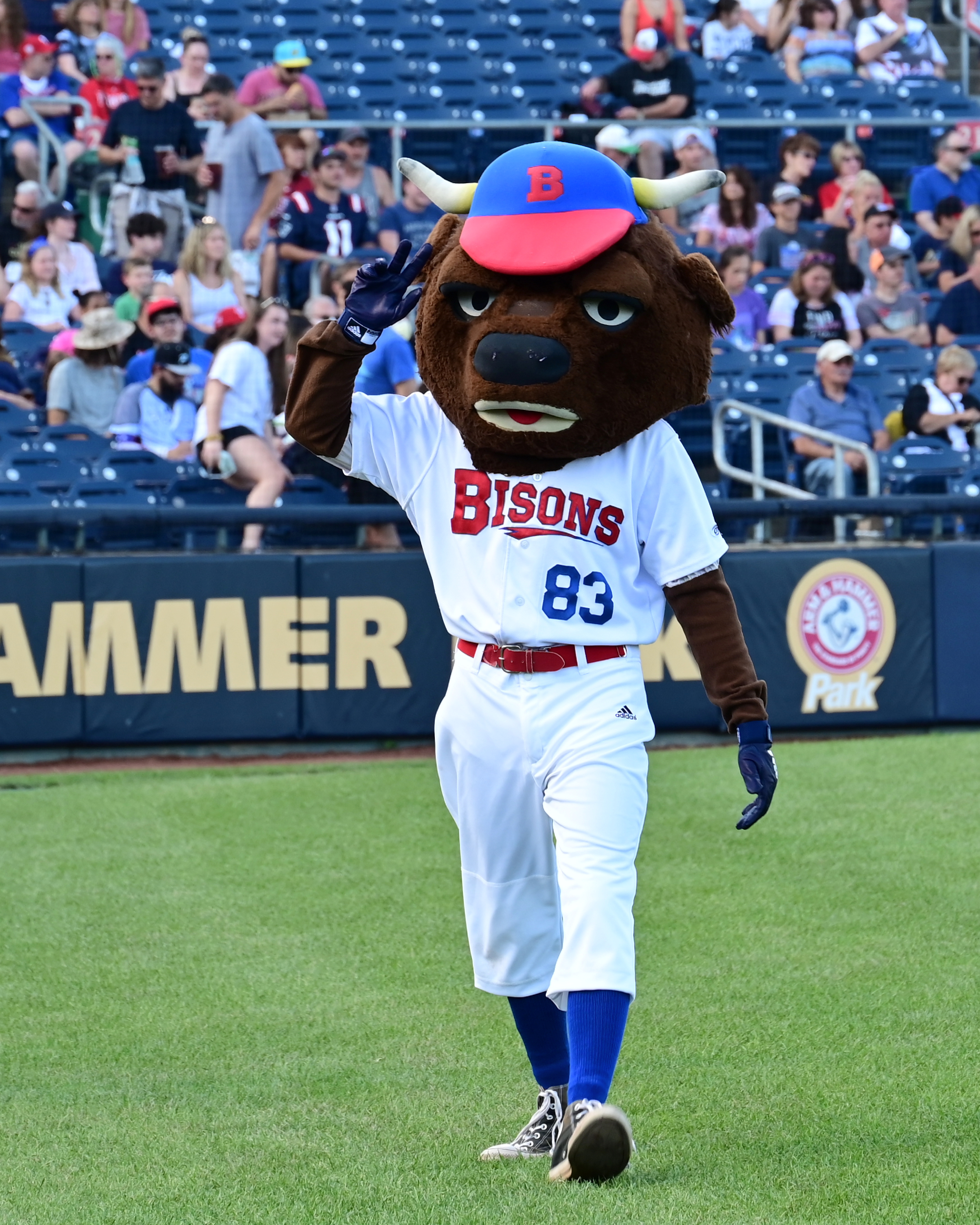
Clockwise from upper left: WCC mascot race, Tom "Conehead" Girot, Buster T. Bison

Donald Palmer was an acrobatic batboy who performed for the Buffalo Bisons as "The Butcher" from 1979 to 1988.

Earl Howze, Jr. was a beer vendor who performed for the Buffalo Bisons as "The Earl of Bud" from 1979 to 1997. He was known for dancing to the song "Tequila" atop the venue's dugouts, with a routine similar to the one made famous by Paul Reubens in the 1985 film Pee-wee's Big Adventure. The Buffalo Bisons honored him at an August 2012 game, with every fan in attendance receiving a bobblehead of his likeness. Howze, Jr. also performed for the Buffalo Sabres at Buffalo Memorial Auditorium.

Tom Girot is a beer vendor who has performed for the Buffalo Bisons as "Conehead" since 1979. The Buffalo Bisons honored him at a July 2018 game, with a beer launched in his likeness called Conehead IPA by Resurgence Brewing Company. Girot has also performed for the Rochester Red Wings at ESL Ballpark and the Toronto Blue Jays at Sahlen Field.

Buster T. Bison has been the official mascot of the Buffalo Bisons since 1983. He was later joined by his cousin Chip in 1994, and his future wife Belle in 2006.

Tracey B. Wilson was an actress who performed for the Buffalo Bisons as the mime "Loud Mouth" from 1993 to 1999.

Buffalo Bisons games since 2011 have featured the Wing, Cheese & Carrot (WCC) mascot race between costumed representations of various local foods just prior to the sixth-inning.

=== Music ===
"Stampede" has been the official fight song of the Buffalo Bisons since their inaugural season at Sahlen Field in 1988.

Tina Turner's recording of "The Best" is played after every Buffalo Bisons home victory at Sahlen Field.

A parody of the Gary Glitter song "Rock and Roll Part 2" featuring lyrics referencing Irv Weinstein was played at Sahlen Field during the seventh-inning stretch of Buffalo Bisons games in the 1990s.
