= Dion James =

American baseball player (born 1962)

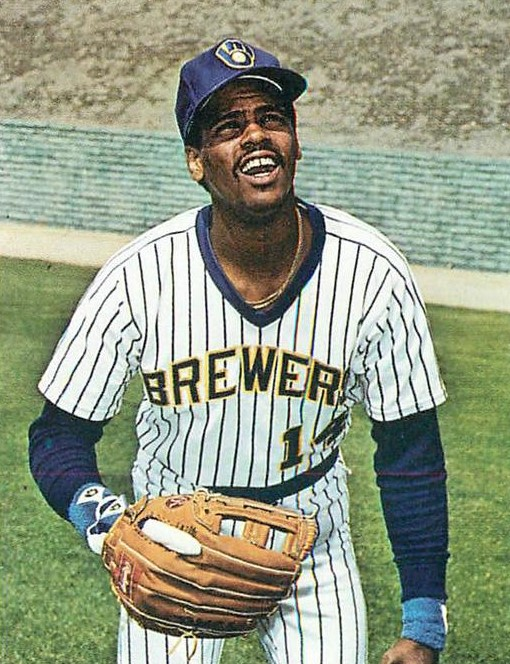
- Outfielder
- Born: November 9, 1962 (age 62); Philadelphia, Pennsylvania, U.S.
- Batted: Left Threw: Left

Professional debut
- MLB: September 16, 1983, for the Milwaukee Brewers
- NPB: April 9, 1994, for the Chunichi Dragons

Last appearance
- NPB: October 8, 1994, for the Chunichi Dragons
- MLB: April 21, 1996, for the New York Yankees

MLB statistics
- Batting average: .288
- Home runs: 32
- Runs batted in: 266

NPB statistics
- Batting average: .263
- Home runs: 8
- Runs batted in: 40
- Stats at Baseball Reference

Teams
- Milwaukee Brewers (1983–1985); Atlanta Braves (1987–1989); Cleveland Indians (1989–1990); New York Yankees (1992–1993); Chunichi Dragons (1994); New York Yankees (1995–1996)

Dion James (born November 9, 1962) is an American former Major League Baseball player who played as a left and center fielder for an eleven-year career from 1983 to 1985, 1987–1990, 1992–1993, 1995-1996.

== Career ==
James starred at C. K. McClatchy High School in Sacramento, California, before being selected by the Milwaukee Brewers in the first round (25th overall) in the 1980 Amateur Entry Draft. He played for the Brewers, Cleveland Indians and New York Yankees all of the American League and the Atlanta Braves of the National League.

James was the Brewers' Rookie of the Year in 1984, when he won the center field job and batted .295. In 1987, James was traded to the Braves for Brad Komminsk. With the Braves, the slap-hitter switched from a straight-up stance to an open crouch, giving him new power; he hit .312 with 37 doubles and 10 homers in 1987. James was a major disappointment in Atlanta's dismal 1988 season and was criticized for erratic fielding. He was traded to the Indians in mid-1989 for Oddibe McDowell, the Rangers' number-one pick in 1984. James lasted less than two seasons with the Indians, but found a part-time job with the Yankees in 1992, hitting .332 as the club's everyday left fielder in 1993. James left for Japan after the season; when he returned to the club in '95, he found little playing time in the Yankees outfield (by that time well-stocked with burgeoning talent) but did see post-season action for the first time in his career.

James was involved in an unusual occurrence while playing for the Atlanta Braves. During the third inning of the April 12, 1987 game against the defending World Series champion New York Mets at Shea Stadium, James hit a flyball to center field off Mets starting pitcher Bob Ojeda. As centerfielder Kevin McReynolds positioned himself to catch the ball, it hit off of and killed a dove in mid-air. McReynolds was unable to catch the ball. James went to second on the play and was credited with a double. He would score later in the inning on a Dale Murphy home run in a game the Braves would win 12–4. James became the first of only two players to kill a bird during play in a regular-season Major League Baseball game.

== Career statistics ==
In 917 games over 11 seasons, James compiled a .288 batting average (781-for-2708) with 362 runs, 142 doubles, 21 triples, 32 home runs, 266 RBI, 318 base on balls, a .364 on-base percentage and .392 slugging percentage. He recorded a .987 fielding percentage at all three outfield positions and first base.
