= Andy Allanson =

American baseball player (born 1961)

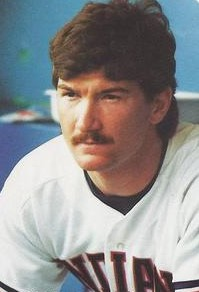
- Catcher
- Born: December 22, 1961 (age 64); Richmond, Virginia, U.S.
- Batted: Right Threw: Right

MLB debut
- April 7, 1986, for the Cleveland Indians

Last MLB appearance
- October 2, 1995, for the California Angels

MLB statistics
- Batting average: .240
- Home runs: 16
- Runs batted in: 140
- Stats at Baseball Reference

Teams
- Cleveland Indians (1986–1989); Detroit Tigers (1991); Milwaukee Brewers (1992); San Francisco Giants (1993); California Angels (1995)

Andrew Neal Allanson (born December 22, 1961) is an American former professional baseball catcher who played in Major League Baseball (MLB) for eight seasons, from 1986 to 1995. Andy was signed as a second-round pick in the 1983 amateur draft, by the Cleveland Indians and scout Bobby Malkmus.

== Amateur career ==
Allanson attended the University of Richmond. In 1982 he played collegiate summer baseball with the Harwich Mariners of the Cape Cod Baseball League and was named a league all-star.

== Professional career ==
Allanson would break into the Major Leagues on April 7, 1986, starting Opening Day behind the plate for the Indians. He went 3–4 with one run batted in, helping the Indians defeat the Baltimore Orioles 6–4. Allanson's handling of the 1986 Cleveland pitching staff was in part responsible for the Indians resurgent, 84–78 mark. He was named the Topps All-Rookie catcher. Despite his size (6'5", 220 lbs), Allanson did not hit a home run until his 1,025th pro at-bat, in the Kingdome that June 23. The Indians, feeling they were perhaps a better-hitting, veteran catcher away from contention, signed Rick Dempsey for 1987, demoting Allanson. Cleveland finished last (61–101), and Allanson was again the starting catcher in 1988.

The acquisition of Joel Skinner before the 1989 season again cut into Allanson's playing time, and when the team traded for Sandy Alomar Jr. in December 1989, it was clear Allanson's starting days were over. He was released the following spring, and was picked up by the Texas Rangers a few days later. Allanson was released in May, and did not play for any other club that year.

He was picked up by the Kansas City Royals in January 1991, and was traded to the Detroit Tigers before the season started. Allanson played 60 games for the Tigers, backing up Mickey Tettleton behind the plate, and became a free agent after the season. He signed with the Milwaukee Brewers for the 1992 season, and joined the San Francisco Giants in 1993. However, he only played 24 games during that two-year span, and would not appear in the Major Leagues again until 1995 with the California Angels, playing in 35 games.
