= Pete Dalena =

American baseball player (born 1960)

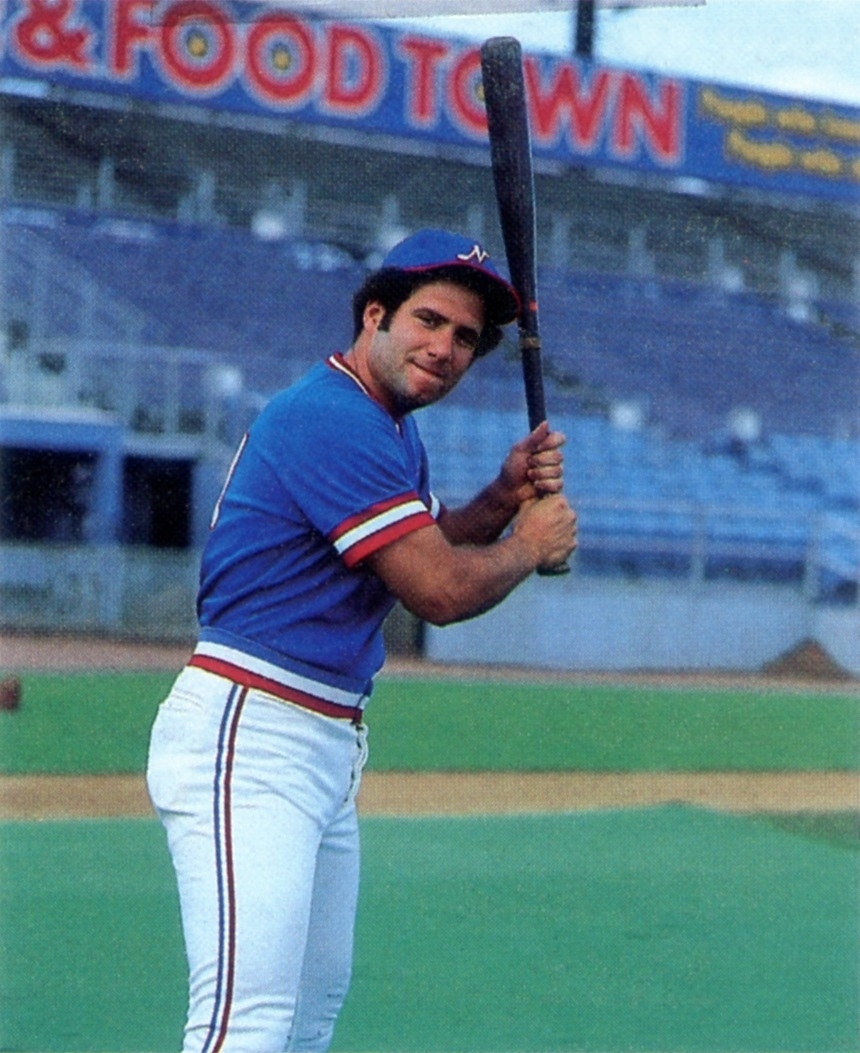
- Dalena with the Nashville Sounds in 1983
- Designated Hitter/Pinch Hitter
- Born: June 26, 1960 (age 65); Fresno, California, U.S.
- Batted: Left Threw: Right

MLB debut
- July 7, 1989, for the Cleveland Indians

Last MLB appearance
- July 21, 1989, for the Cleveland Indians

MLB statistics
- Batting average: .143
- Home runs: 0
- Runs batted in: 0
- Stats at Baseball Reference

Teams
- Cleveland Indians (1989)

Peter Martin Dalena (born June 26, 1960) is an American former Major League Baseball designated hitter/pinch hitter who played for the Cleveland Indians in 1989. He weighed 200 pounds and was 5'11" in height. Dalena, who threw right-handed but batted left, attended Fresno State University.

== Career ==
In 1982 the New York Yankees drafted Dalena in the 27th round (690th overall) of the June Regular Phase amateur entry draft. As a free-agent, the Indians picked him up on November 22, 1988.

On July 7, 1989, Dalena made his major league debut at the age of 29, wearing number 31. In 5 games (7 at-bats), he batted .143 with his only career hit being a double. He struck out three times. Dalena played his final major league game two weeks after his debut, on July 21.
