= Colby Ward =

American baseball player (born 1964)

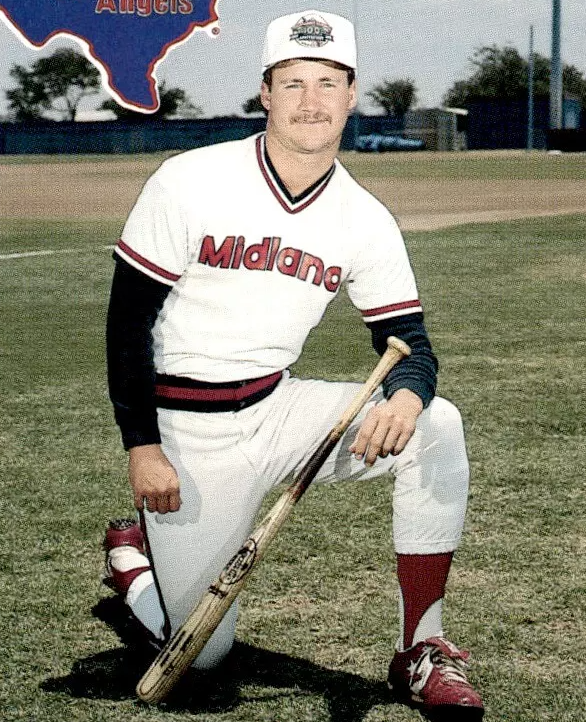
- Ward with the Midland Angels c. 1988
- Relief pitcher
- Born: January 2, 1964 (age 61); Springville, Utah, U.S.
- Batted: Right Threw: Right

MLB debut
- July 27, 1990, for the Cleveland Indians

Last MLB appearance
- September 27, 1990, for the Cleveland Indians

MLB statistics
- Win–loss record: 1–3
- Earned run average: 4.25
- Strikeouts: 23
- Stats at Baseball Reference

Teams
- Cleveland Indians (1990)

Robert Colby Ward (born January 2, 1964) is an American former professional baseball player. Ward pitched for the Cleveland Indians of the Major League Baseball (MLB).

Ward batted right-handed and fielded and threw right-handed as well. He is 6'2 and weighed 185 lbs. He played his first MLB game on July 27, 1990, and played his last MLB game on September 27 of the same season. He finished his MLB career with a 1-3 won-loss record.

Ward attended Brigham Young University. While at BYU, Ward set the school record for best win–loss record (31–10), as well as most pitching decisions (51). Both records still stand.

Ward was drafted by the California Angels in the 11th round of the 1986 Major League Baseball draft.
