= Denny González =

Dominican baseball player (born 1963)

- Infielder
- Born: July 22, 1963 (age 63); Sabana Grande de Boyá, Dominican Republic
- Batted: Right Threw: Right

Professional debut
- MLB: August 6, 1984, for the Pittsburgh Pirates
- NPB: July 29, 1991, for the Yomiuri Giants

Last appearance
- MLB: September 21, 1989, for the Cleveland Indians
- NPB: April 5, 1992, for the Yomiuri Giants

MLB statistics
- Batting average: .206
- Home runs: 4
- Runs batted in: 18

NPB statistics
- Batting average: .248
- Home runs: 9
- Runs batted in: 27

CPBL statistics
- Batting average: .309
- Home runs: 27
- Runs batted in: 82
- Stats at Baseball Reference

Teams
- Pittsburgh Pirates (1984–1985, 1987–1988); Cleveland Indians (1989); Yomiuri Giants (1991–1992); China Times Eagles (1996)

Denio Mariano González Manzueta (born July 22, 1963) is a Dominican former professional baseball infielder. He played during five seasons at Major League Baseball (MLB) for the Pittsburgh Pirates and Cleveland Indians. He was signed by the Pirates as an amateur free agent in 1981. González played his first professional season (in American baseball) with their Rookie league Gulf Coast Pirates in 1981, and his last season with the Triple-A affiliates of the Cincinnati Reds (Nashville Sounds) and Boston Red Sox (Pawtucket Red Sox) in 1992.
