= Steve Springer =

American baseball player (born 1961)

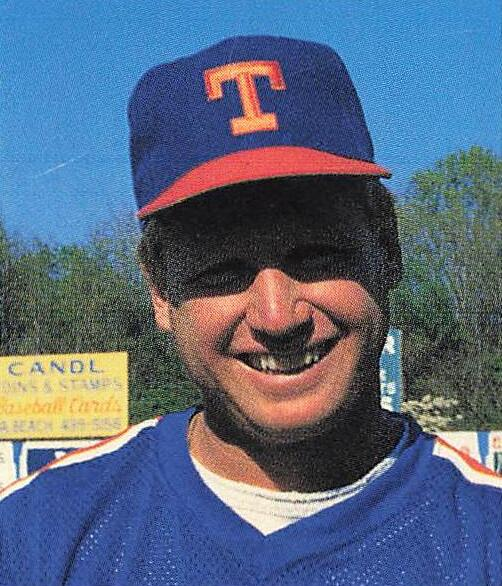
- Springer with the Tidewater Tides c. 1988
- Third baseman/Pinch hitter
- Born: February 11, 1961 (age 65); Long Beach, California, U.S.
- Batted: Right Threw: Right

MLB debut
- May 22, 1990, for the Cleveland Indians

Last MLB appearance
- August 25, 1992, for the New York Mets

MLB statistics
- Batting average: .235
- Hits: 4
- Runs batted in: 1
- Stats at Baseball Reference

Teams
- Cleveland Indians (1990); New York Mets (1992)

Steven Michael Springer (born February 11, 1961) is an American former professional baseball player who appeared in Major League Baseball (MLB) as a third baseman and pinch hitter for eight games over two seasons for the Cleveland Indians (1990) and New York Mets (1992). He threw and batted right-handed, stood 6 feet (1.8 m) tall and weighed 190 pounds (86 kg).

== Career ==
Springer was selected by the Mets from the University of Utah in the 20th round of the 1982 Major League Baseball draft, but he was traded away during his seventh season in minor league baseball. He made his MLB debut with the Indians, playing in four games in 1990, and in his first game on May 22 he singled in two at bats against Chuck Finley of the California Angels. He recorded his only Major League RBI three days later, with a sacrifice fly against Scott Sanderson of the Oakland Athletics.

Two years later, in August 1992, he received a second Major League trial — this time with his original organization. The Mets, who had reacquired him as a minor league free agent, recalled him from the Triple-A Tidewater Tides after he had batted .290 with 17 home runs in the International League. After three appearances as a pinch hitter and defensive replacement, he started the August 25 game at third base against the San Francisco Giants at Candlestick Park. Springer collected two hits in three at bats, including a double off Giants' starting pitcher Trevor Wilson for his only extra-base hit in the Majors. It would be Springer's last MLB game. All told, he collected four hits in 17 at bats, for a .235 lifetime batting average.

His minor league playing career lasted through 1995, however, and in 14 seasons (1982–1995) and 1,591 games played for six different MLB organizations, he slugged 128 home runs and collected 1,592 hits.

After retiring from the field, Springer became a player agent. Since 2008, he has been a professional scout for the Toronto Blue Jays. He also is a "performance coach" throughout the Toronto minor league system, working with batters on their mental approach to hitting.
