= Scott Bailes =

American baseball player (born 1961)

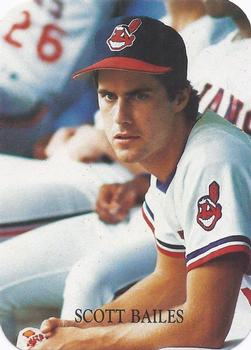
- Pitcher
- Born: December 18, 1961 (age 64); Chillicothe, Ohio, U.S.
- Batted: Left Threw: Left

MLB debut
- April 9, 1986, for the Cleveland Indians

Last MLB appearance
- September 27, 1998, for the Texas Rangers

MLB statistics
- Win–loss record: 39–44
- Earned run average: 4.95
- Strikeouts: 351
- Stats at Baseball Reference

Teams
- Cleveland Indians (1986–1989); California Angels (1990–1992); Texas Rangers (1997–1998)

Scott Alan Bailes (born December 18, 1961) is an American former professional baseball pitcher who pitched for three teams during a nine-year Major League Baseball (MLB) career.

== Career ==
During his youth, he moved to Missouri, and participated in Little League, Pony League, and American Legion teams. He played baseball in college for Southwest Missouri State University, and on January 12, 1982, was drafted by the Texas Rangers in the 7th round. Bailes did not sign, and played college baseball during the spring of 1982. In the secondary phase of the draft, Bailes was drafted again, this time in the fourth round by the Pittsburgh Pirates on June 7, 1982. He signed with the team on July 1.

== Professional career ==
After playing in the Pirates' farm system for a few years, he was traded to the Cleveland Indians. On May 30, 1985, the Indians traded Johnnie LeMaster to the Pirates for a player to be named later, which ended up being Bailes, who joined the Indians on July 3. He joined the Indians Major League roster for the start of the 1986 season, and made his pitching debut against the Baltimore Orioles on April 9, 1986. On April 13, he got his first win, relieving Don Schulze in the fourth inning and pitching 5 1/3 scoreless innings to finish an 8–2 victory over the Detroit Tigers. "I told some of the Tigers, 'I watched you guys in the World Series two years ago,'" Bailes said after the game. "I was having some doubts that I could get people out up here, but after today I found out I can. Even the good guys, like Lance Parrish, I got them out." He finished his rookie season with a 10–10 record, earning 7 saves over 62 games. He set a record for most relief wins by an Indian rookie with 8. He continued to be used as a starter, reliever, and closer the following season, starting 17 games and finishing 15. He finished with a 7–8 record, 6 saves, and a 4.64 ERA in 1987.

The 1988 season saw Bailes being used primarily as a starter. He threw 5 complete games and 2 shutouts, yet was moved back into the bullpen late in the season and finished with a 9–14 record. In 1989, Bailes managed his lowest ERA to date at 4.28, however another losing record led to him being traded in the off-season. On January 9, 1990, Bailes was traded to the California Angels for Jeff Manto and minor league prospect Colin Charland. He was no longer being used as a starter, and after a few rough outings and an ERA of 6.37, Bailes was sent to the minor leagues. In 1991, Bailes was back in the bullpen, and managed an ERA of 4.18 for the season, a career best for him to that point. However, the 1992 season was a struggle for Bailes, as he finished with an ERA of 7.45, and was released by the team on October 15, 1992. He signed with the Kansas City Royals on February 25, 1993, but was released on April 3. He signed on with the Toronto Blue Jays farm system on April 25, but could not make it past the Syracuse Chiefs at the AAA level, and after being released in January 1995 he retired. After spending some time in the business field and playing for a semi-pro league in Springfield, Missouri, Bailes signed on with the Texas Rangers after the 1996 season in hopes of making a comeback.

Bailes spent most of the 1997 season in the Texas Rangers' farm system, and was called up in early August. He made his first major league appearance in over four seasons on August 8, when he pitched 0.2 innings against the New York Yankees. He finished the season with an ERA of 2.86 in 24 appearances. He was granted free agency on November 6, but re-signed with the Rangers a month later. He played the full 1998 season with the Rangers, but retired after being granted free agency.

== Post career ==
Scott is the co-announcer on the Ozarks CW, calling games for the Springfield Cardinals franchise, the AA-affiliate for the St. Louis Cardinals. From 2009 to 2013, Scott served on the Springfield, MO City Council. He serves on the advisory committee for Champion Athletes of the Ozarks and serves on the board of the Springfield Soccer Club. Bailes previously served as the Director of the Special Olympics from 1994 to 1995. Scott is the general manager of Ballparks of America, in Branson, Missouri.

== Personal ==
Scott and his wife JoAnne have three daughters: Alli, Tara, and Mandy.
