= Ken Bolek =

American baseball coach

Ken Bolek (born December 20, 1953) is a former minor league baseball coach, major league coach and minor league manager. He was the director of baseball at IMG Academy, a high level training school for elite baseball players from all levels of amateur and professional competition.

Bolek attended the University of Arizona and Mississippi State University. In 1975, he played collegiate summer baseball with the Chatham A's of the Cape Cod Baseball League and was named a league all-star.

Bolek got his start in coaching with Cuyahoga Community College in 1979 and 1980. During his tenure there, they were Ohio Junior College champions. At Mississippi State University in 1981, Bolek was a graduate assistant for the team as they made it to the College World Series. He then managed at the professional level (see chart below) and spent two years as a coach for the Cleveland Indians (1992–93). Bolek became the Director of Baseball at IMG Academy in 1995.

== Year-by-year managerial record ==
Year	Team	League	Record	Organization	Playoffs
1986	Asheville Tourists	South Atlantic League	90–50	Houston Astros	Northern Division Champions
1987	Osceola Astros	Florida State League	80–59	Houston Astros	Northern Division Champions
1988	Waterloo Indians	Midwest League	78–62	Cleveland Indians	
1989	Kinston Indians	Carolina League	76–60	Cleveland Indians	
1990	Canton–Akron Indians	Eastern League	76–64	Cleveland Indians	Lost in Playoffs
1991	Canton–Akron Indians	Eastern League	75–65	Cleveland Indians	Lost in Playoffs
1994	Daytona Cubs	Florida State League	61–73	Chicago Cubs	

Preceded by Bill Hayes	Daytona Cubs manager 1994	Succeeded by Dave Trembley
