= Brad Komminsk =

American baseball player (born 1961)

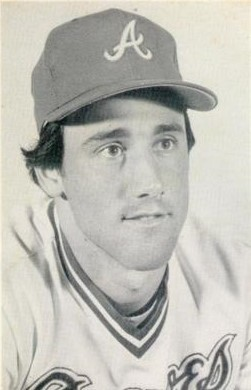
- Outfielder
- Born: April 4, 1961 (age 64); Lima, Ohio, U.S.
- Batted: Right Threw: Right

MLB debut
- August 14, 1983, for the Atlanta Braves

Last MLB appearance
- October 5, 1991, for the Oakland Athletics

MLB statistics
- Batting average: .218
- Home runs: 23
- Runs batted in: 105
- Stats at Baseball Reference

Teams
- Atlanta Braves (1983–1986); Milwaukee Brewers (1987); Cleveland Indians (1989); San Francisco Giants (1990); Baltimore Orioles (1990); Oakland Athletics (1991)

Brad Lynn Komminsk (born April 4, 1961) is an American former professional baseball outfielder. He attended Shawnee High School in Lima, Ohio, where he played basketball and baseball and was an all-state linebacker in football. He received athletic scholarship offers from Ohio State, Nebraska and Clemson. On June 5, 1979, he was drafted by the Atlanta Braves with the fourth pick in the 1979 amateur draft and received a $70,000 (equivalent to $303,000 in 2024) signing bonus.

Komminsk was a highly regarded prospect in the Braves system. He appeared on the cover of Baseball America in 1981 and 1983, where he was described as a potential Triple Crown winner and as the best five-tool player in Minor League Baseball. Hank Aaron described him as a "can't miss" prospect and compared him to future Hall of Famer Andre Dawson and MVP Dale Murphy. Before reaching Major League Baseball (MLB), he was featured on ABC's Nightline and NBC's This Week in Baseball. In 1984, the Braves rejected a trade offer from the Boston Red Sox which would have brought them future Hall of Famer Jim Rice in part because Boston asked for Komminsk in the deal.

Despite a sterling record in the minor leagues, Komminsk never played well in the majors. He chalked it up to MLB coaches trying to change his mechanics so as "to be part of the Brad Komminsk project." His Hall of Fame manager, Joe Torre, attributed his failure, at least in part, to an asthma problem. Hall of Fame teammate and roommate Tom Glavine wrote that the pressure of high expectations may have hindered Komminsk to some extent. In 2011, Baseball Prospectus included him in a list of the 50 most disappointing prospects of all time. In 2015, The Sporting News characterized Atlanta's selection of Komminsk over Andy Van Slyke as one of the five worst draft decisions in franchise history.

Komminsk played parts of eight seasons in MLB. His best season came in 1989 with the Cleveland Indians. He only appeared in 100 or more games one time, a 106-game campaign with the Braves in 1985. Komminsk spent a few seasons in the minors after his final MLB season in 1991, even playing professionally in Italy and for the independent Winnipeg Goldeyes of the Northern League. In 1995, he was a replacement player in spring training for the Minnesota Twins during the ongoing strike.

Following his playing career, Komminsk was a minor league coach and manager with several teams, including the Kinston Indians and Bowie Baysox. He was also a hitting coach for the Norfolk Tides, the Triple-A affiliate of the Baltimore Orioles, in 2011.

Preceded by Bien Figueroa	Bowie Baysox manager 2008–2010	Succeeded by Gary Kendall
