= Luis Isaac =

Puerto Rican baseball player and coach (1946–2026)

- Coach
- Born: June 19, 1946; Rio Piedras, Puerto Rico
- Died: April 26, 2026 (aged 79); Carolina, Puerto Rico
- Batted: Right Threw: Right
- Stats at Baseball Reference

Teams
- As coach: Cleveland Indians (1987–1991, 1994–2008)

Luis Isaac (June 19, 1946 – April 2026) was a Puerto Rican professional baseball player and coach. As a player, he was a catcher in the minor leagues from 1962 through 1979; he batted and threw right-handed. He is well known for his large, well-groomed mustache.

== Biography ==
In 1965, Isaac joined the Cleveland Indians as a player, and he proceeded to spend the next 44 years in the organization either as a player, coach, scout, or minor league manager. In 1972, he served as the manager of the Single-A Batavia Trojans of the New York–Penn League. The next year, he resumed his playing career for one more season, playing in 39 games with the Double-A Chattanooga Lookouts.

Isaac spent 20 seasons and two separate stints on the major league coaching staff of the Cleveland Indians. On July 17, 1987, Isaac was promoted to serve as the bullpen coach of the Indians following the firing of manager Pat Corrales. He was not retained after the 1991 season, but was later re-hired as Cleveland's bullpen coach on October 12, 1993. Isaac was fired by the Indians on September 30, 2008.

On April 26, 2026, the Cleveland Guardians announced that Isaac had died at the age of 79.
