= Félix Fermín =

Dominican baseball player (born 1963)

- Shortstop / Manager
- Born: October 9, 1963 (age 62); Mao, Dominican Republic
- Batted: Right Threw: Right

MLB debut
- July 8, 1987, for the Pittsburgh Pirates

Last MLB appearance
- August 7, 1996, for the Chicago Cubs

MLB statistics
- Batting average: .259
- Home runs: 4
- Runs batted in: 207
- Stats at Baseball Reference

Teams
- Pittsburgh Pirates (1987–1988); Cleveland Indians (1989–1993); Seattle Mariners (1994–1995); Chicago Cubs (1996)
Medals
Men's baseball
Representing Dominican Republic
Central American and Caribbean Games
Gold medal – first place	1982 Havana	Team

Félix José Fermín Minaya (born October 9, 1963) is a Dominican former professional baseball shortstop who played in Major League Baseball (MLB) for the Pittsburgh Pirates (1987–1988), Cleveland Indians (1989–1993), Seattle Mariners (1994–1995), and Chicago Cubs (1996).

== Playing career ==
On August 22, 1989, Fermin tied an 87-year-old MLB record with four sacrifice hits in one game against the Seattle Mariners. Along with Reggie Jefferson and cash, Fermín was traded by the Cleveland Indians to the Seattle Mariners in exchange for Omar Vizquel before the 1994 season. Fermín was a regular starter in 1995 when the Mariners won the American League's Western Division. He led the AL in sacrifice hits (32) in 1989; he also led the AL in most at bats per strikeout (34.3) in 1993. In 1996, Fermin was very nearly traded to the Yankees for Mariano Rivera.

In a 10-season career, Fermín played in 903 games and had 2,767 at-bats, 294 runs, 718 hits, 86 doubles, 11 triples, 4 home runs, 207 runs batted in, 27 stolen bases, 166 walks, a .259 batting average, a .305 on-base percentage, a .303 slugging average, 838 total bases.

Fermín is the current manager for Águilas Cibaeñas of the Dominican Winter League. Since 2000, he led the team to five championships until he was removed from the job in 2009. He was then hired to be the manager for the Gigantes del Cibao until the Aguilas Cibaeñas hired him back in 2011.

As a player, his nickname was "El Gato", for Felix the Cat and his quick reflexes and defense.

== Managerial career ==
On June 19, 2023, Fermín was named the manager of the Dominican Republic national baseball team at the 2023 Central American and Caribbean Games, held in El Salvador. The Dominican Republic finished fourth, good enough to qualify for the 2023 Pan American Games in Chile.

His son, Félix Fermín Jr., was appointed manager of the national team for the 2026 Central American and Caribbean Games.

Fermín began the 2026 season as the manager of the Tecolotes de los Dos Laredos of the Mexican League. On June 26, 2026, Fermín was fired by the Tecolotes, after leading the team to a 24–35 start.
