= Beau Allred =

American baseball player (born 1965)

- Outfielder
- Born: June 4, 1965 (age 61); Mesa, Arizona, U.S.
- Batted: Left Threw: Left

MLB debut
- September 7, 1989, for the Cleveland Indians

Last MLB appearance
- June 25, 1991, for the Cleveland Indians

MLB statistics
- Batting average: .230
- Home runs: 4
- Runs batted in: 15
- Stats at Baseball Reference

Teams
- Cleveland Indians (1989–1991)

Dale LeBeau Allred (born June 4, 1965) is an American former professional baseball outfielder who appeared in 65 games over parts of three seasons in Major League Baseball between 1989 and 1991 for the Cleveland Indians. Born in Mesa, Arizona, Allred threw and batted left-handed and was listed as 6 feet (1.8 m) tall and 190 pounds (86 kg).

== College and minor leagues ==
Allred played collegiately at Lamar University. As a freshman, he had a batting average of .350, 16 home runs, and 44 RBIs. After the season, he was drafted by the Cleveland Indians in the 25th round of the 1987 MLB draft. He spent the 1987 season with the Burlington Indians, where he hit .341 in 54 games. The following season, he was promoted to the Kinston Indians, and had a .252 batting average in 126 games. The next year, Allred played primarily for the Canton–Akron Indians and hit .303 for the team in 118 games. He was then promoted to the Colorado Springs Sky Sox, and played in 11 games for them before being called up to the majors in September.

== Professional career ==
Throughout his three-season career, Allred split time between the Indians and minor leagues. He made his major league debut on 7 September 1989. He played three seasons for the Cleveland Indians between 1989 and 1991. In 1989 he played in 13 games, in 1990 he played in four games, and in 1991 in played in 48 games. In his career, Allred had a batting average of .230 with four home runs and 15 RBIs. He was immortalized in a 1991 article in Sports Illustrated where writer Steve Rushin revealed several pen-written lines of graffiti in a Cleveland Stadium bathroom chronicling Allred's career: "Shoeless Beau Allred", "Clueless Beau Allred" and finally "Clubless Beau Allred".
