= Rod Nichols =

American baseball player (1964–2025)

- Pitcher
- Born: December 29, 1964; Burlington, Iowa, U.S.
- Died: May 14, 2025 (aged 60)
- Batted: Right Threw: Right

Professional debut
- MLB: July 30, 1988, for the Cleveland Indians
- NPB: August 6, 1997, for the Fukuoka Daiei Hawks

Last appearance
- MLB: August 29, 1995, for the Atlanta Braves
- NPB: August 10, 1997, for the Fukuoka Daiei Hawks

MLB statistics
- Win–loss record: 11–31
- Earned run average: 4.43
- Strikeouts: 214

NPB statistics
- Win–loss record: 0–0
- Earned run average: 3.00
- Strikeouts: 0
- Stats at Baseball Reference

Teams
- Cleveland Indians (1988–1992); Los Angeles Dodgers (1993); Atlanta Braves (1995); Fukuoka Daiei Hawks (1997)

Rodney Lea Nichols (December 29, 1964 – May 14, 2025) was an American professional baseball pitcher who played in Major League Baseball (MLB) from 1988 to 1995 with the Cleveland Indians, Los Angeles Dodgers, and Atlanta Braves. Nichols was a three-year letterman at University of New Mexico. He also played one season in Japan for the Fukuoka Daiei Hawks in 1997.

After retiring from playing, Nichols worked as a minor league pitching coach for the Reading Phillies (2002–2004), Scranton/Wilkes-Barre Red Barons (2005–2006), Ottawa Lynx (2007), and Lehigh Valley IronPigs (2008–12). In 2013, he was named the bullpen coach for the Philadelphia Phillies. Nichols returned to the minors in 2016 to serve as the pitching coach for the Chicago Cubs Triple-A Iowa affiliate. He retired after the 2019 season.

Nichols was inducted into the New Mexico Sports Hall of Fame.

Nichols died on May 14, 2025, at the age of 60.
