= Brian Graham (baseball) =

American baseball coach (born 1960)

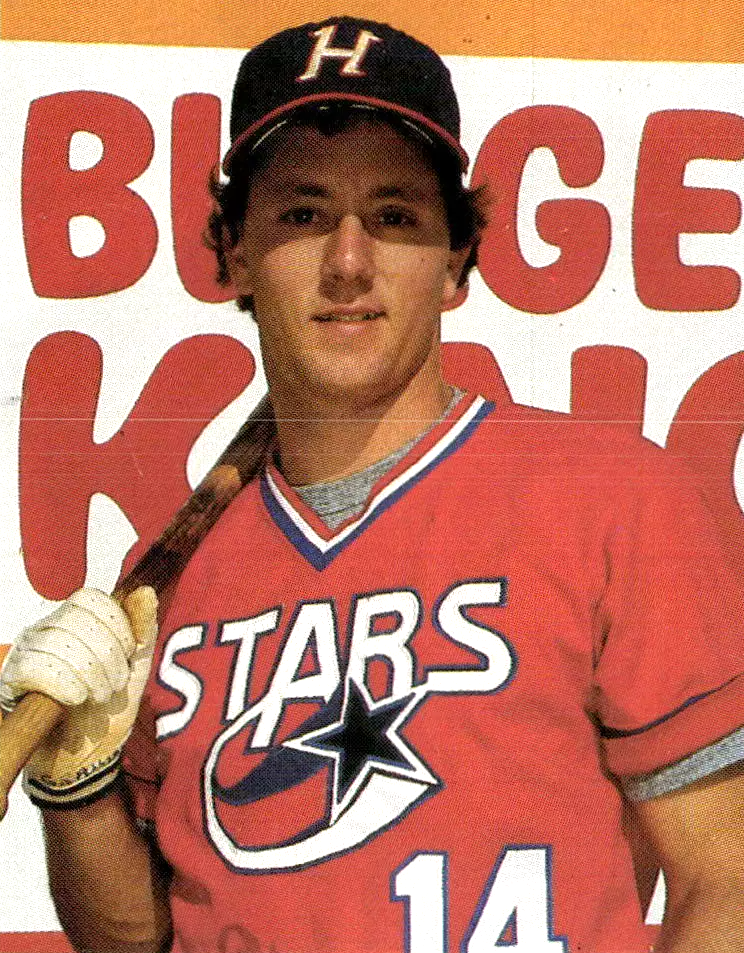
- Graham with the Huntsville Stars c. 1985
- Second baseman / Coach
- Born: April 9, 1961 (age 65); San Diego, California, U.S.
- Bats: Right Throws: Right

Teams
- As coach: Cleveland Indians (1998–1999); Baltimore Orioles (2000); As executive: Pittsburgh Pirates (2007); Baltimore Orioles (2018)

Brian Graham (born April 9, 1960) is an American former Major League Baseball coach for the Cleveland Indians and Baltimore Orioles, former MLB executive with the Pittsburgh Pirates and Orioles, minor league player and minor league manager and coach.

Graham also serves as the on-field director of the MLB Draft Combine, the executive director of the Appalachian League and the owner of Hardcore Elite Baseball organization. In 2021, Graham was an advance scout for the United States national baseball team.

== College ==
Graham attended the University of California, Los Angeles where he played both baseball and football. When he finished his collegiate career, Graham held school records for most hits, stolen bases, and runs scored. In football, Graham was a member of the 1978 Fiesta Bowl team. In 1996, he was inducted into UCLA's Baseball Hall of Fame. Graham received a Bachelor of Arts degree in Behavioral Sciences from National University.

== Minor league career ==
In 1982, Graham was chosen in the fourth round of the 1982 draft by the Oakland Athletics, and he played in the minor league systems of Oakland, the Milwaukee Brewers, the Detroit Tigers, and the Cleveland Indians over the next five years as a second baseman.

== Coaching/managing ==
In nine seasons as a minor league manager in the Cleveland Indians organization, Graham's teams finished above .500 each year, compiling a 704-491 (.589) record. Graham managed eight consecutive playoff teams. He was named the Carolina League's Manager of the Year in 1991 while leading the Kinston Indians to a championship, the “Best Managerial Prospect” by Eastern League managers and Baseball America in 1993 and Minor League Manager of the Year by USA Today's Baseball Weekly in 1996 while with the Buffalo Bisons (winning a championship in 1997). Graham has also managed in the Dominican Republic Winter League for Aguilas (1991) and has also coached and managed in the Arizona Fall League (1993–94).

Graham was a major league coach with the Cleveland Indians in 1998 and 1999 and with the Baltimore Orioles in 2000. Graham spent the 2001 season as the Field Coordinator for the Florida Marlins.

== Major league executive ==
Graham was signed to the Pirates on December 3, 2001 and eventually rose to be the senior director for player development. In that position, he coordinated instruction and oversaw the signing of free agents, staffing, budgets, player movement, affiliate relationships and the Latin American field operations. In addition, he installed and implemented a system of individual player plans which provided instruction and resources to insure the individual development of every Pirate player. In 2002, the Pirates were honored as the Topps' Baseball “Organization of the Year.”

On September 7, 2007, he was appointed interim general manager of the Pirates after the dismissal of Dave Littlefield. On October 5, 2007, he was fired along with manager Jim Tracy, scouting director Ed Creech, and director of baseball operations Jon Mercurio.

Graham was named special assignment coach for the minor leagues for the Baltimore Orioles on October 30, 2007. Graham was named director of player development for the Baltimore Orioles in 2013. His 2012 and 2013 seasons as an Orioles executive were portrayed in a 2021 memoir called Clubbie from the Aberdeen IronBirds' clubhouse attendant, Greg Larson.

In early October 2018, Graham was named as the Interim General Manager in the wake of the firings of Dan Duquette and Buck Showalter.

Preceded by Dave Littlefield	General Manager of the Pittsburgh Pirates; 2007	Succeeded by Neal Huntington
