= Steve Olin =

American baseball player (1965–1993)

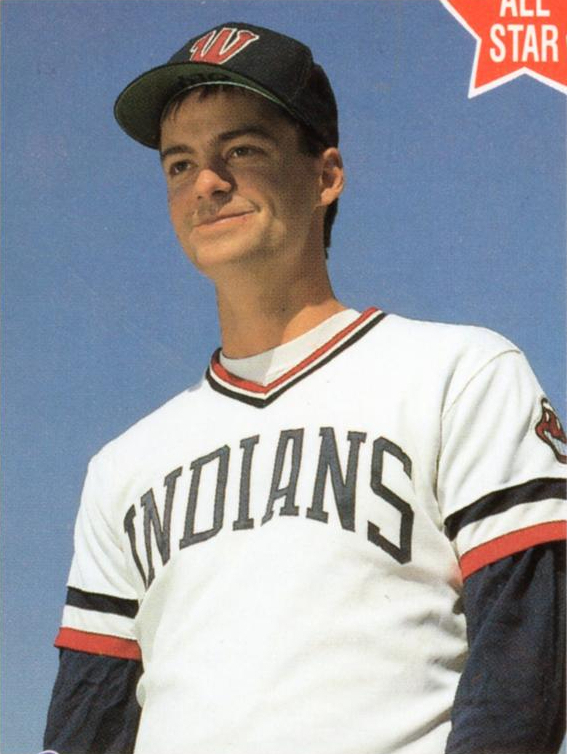
- Olin with the Waterloo Indians c. 1988
- Pitcher
- Born: October 4, 1965; Portland, Oregon, U.S.
- Died: March 22, 1993 (aged 27); Little Lake Nellie, Clermont, Florida, U.S.
- Batted: Right Threw: Right

MLB debut
- July 29, 1989, for the Cleveland Indians

Last MLB appearance
- October 4, 1992, for the Cleveland Indians

MLB statistics
- Win–loss record: 16–19
- Earned run average: 3.10
- Strikeouts: 173
- Saves: 48
- Stats at Baseball Reference

Teams
- Cleveland Indians (1989–1992)

Steven Robert Olin (October 4, 1965 – March 22, 1993) was an American right-handed pitcher in Major League Baseball who played for four seasons in the American League with the Cleveland Indians. Olin was a right-handed submarining relief pitcher for the Cleveland Indians from 1988 to 1992. Olin died, along with teammate and fellow reliever Tim Crews, in a 1993 boating accident.

== Early life ==
Steve Olin was born on October 4, 1965, in Portland, Oregon, and grew up in nearby Beaverton. He graduated from Beaverton High School in 1984, and was recruited by baseball coach Jack Dunn to attend Portland State University. Olin set a Pac-10 Conference record with 31 career complete games at Portland State between 1984 and 1987.

== Career ==
In 195 career games, Olin pitched 273 innings and posted a win–loss record of 16–19, with 48 saves, 118 games finished, and a 3.10 earned run average (ERA). He earned his final win on September 9, 1992, against the Milwaukee Brewers. Olin won the game in relief when Cleveland scored two runs in the top of the ninth.

== Death ==
During spring training before the 1993 season, Olin was killed in a boating accident on Little Lake Nellie in Clermont, Florida. The boat he was in struck a pier, killing him and fellow reliever Tim Crews and seriously injuring Bob Ojeda. Crews, who was piloting the boat, had a blood alcohol level of 0.14 at the time of the accident; Olin and Ojeda had negligible traces of alcohol in their blood. Olin and Crews were the first active major league players to die since Thurman Munson in 1979. In their memory, the Cleveland Indians wore a patch on their jerseys featuring both players' uniform numbers during the 1993 season.

== Remembrance ==
The Beatles song "Yellow Submarine" was played before each of submariner Olin's appearances for the Indians in home games.

One of Olin's favorite songs, "The Dance" by Garth Brooks, was played over the stadium speakers when the Indians clinched the 1995 American League Central Division. Before the game, manager Mike Hargrove had phoned the Indians scoreboard room, requesting that the song be played that night.

"I thought it would mean a lot to anyone who was there [with the Indians at the time of the accident]", said Hargrove. "For those who weren't there it had no significance, but it was still a good song. It was a tribute to those guys, to their families. It was part of our promise to never forget them. We didn't tell anyone that we were going to do it. For those who knew, there wasn't a dry eye to be seen. I saw Charlie Nagy; tears were rolling down his face."

== See also ==
- List of baseball players who died during their careers
