= Kevin Wickander =

American baseball player (born 1965)

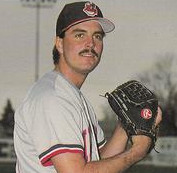
- Wickander in 1988
- Pitcher
- Born: January 4, 1965 (age 60); Fort Dodge, Iowa, U.S.
- Batted: Left Threw: Left

MLB debut
- August 10, 1989, for the Cleveland Indians

Last MLB appearance
- June 12, 1996, for the Milwaukee Brewers

MLB statistics
- Win–loss record: 5–1
- Earned run average: 4.02
- Strikeouts: 101
- Stats at Baseball Reference

Teams
- Cleveland Indians (1989–1990, 1992–1993); Cincinnati Reds (1993); Detroit Tigers (1995); Milwaukee Brewers (1995–1996)

Kevin Dean Wickander (born January 4, 1965) is a former Major League Baseball player. A pitcher, Wickander played for the Cleveland Indians, Cincinnati Reds, Milwaukee Brewers, and Detroit Tigers from 1989 to 1996.

Wickander attended Cortez High School in Phoenix, Arizona and played college baseball at Grand Canyon University. Although he grew up only ten miles from the campus of Grand Canyon, he admitted he had not heard of it until three months before he enrolled. He was the ace of the Grand Canyon Antelopes baseball team that won the 1986 NAIA World Series.

Wickander made his Major League debut with the Cleveland Indians on August 10, 1989. He missed most of the 1990 season after breaking his elbow. In May 1991, he sought treatment for alcoholism and took a leave of absence to be treated in-patient at the Cleveland Clinic. After being successfully discharged from treatment, he pitched his first full Major League season in 1992. In May of the following year, he was traded to the Cincinnati Reds.

Wickander started the 1994 season pitching in Taiwan but, after appearing in seven games, traveled back to the United States for the birth of his first child and did not return to Taiwan.

After his playing career ended he spent several years in prison on drug and other related charges.
