= Jeff Manto =

American baseball player and coach (born 1964)

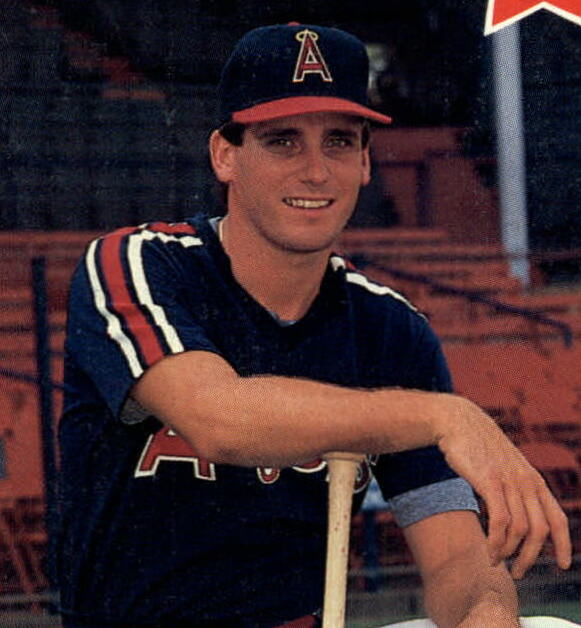
- Manto with the Midland Angels c. 1988
- Third baseman / First baseman
- Born: August 23, 1964 (age 62); Bristol, Pennsylvania, U.S.
- Batted: Right Threw: Right

Professional debut
- MLB: June 7, 1990, for the Cleveland Indians
- NPB: April 5, 1996, for the Yomiuri Giants

Last appearance
- NPB: April 21, 1996, for the Yomiuri Giants
- MLB: April 20, 2000, for the Colorado Rockies

MLB statistics
- Batting average: .230
- Home runs: 31
- Runs batted in: 97

NPB statistics
- Batting average: .111
- Home runs: 0
- Runs batted in: 1
- Stats at Baseball Reference

Teams
- Cleveland Indians (1990–1991); Philadelphia Phillies (1993); Baltimore Orioles (1995); Yomiuri Giants (1996); Boston Red Sox (1996); Seattle Mariners (1996); Cleveland Indians (1997–1998); Detroit Tigers (1998); Cleveland Indians (1998–1999); New York Yankees (1999); Colorado Rockies (2000)

Jeffrey Paul Manto (born August 23, 1964) is an American former journeyman baseball player and hitting coach. Manto is currently the head coach of the Conwell–Egan Catholic High School baseball team. He is the former manager of the Trenton Thunder of the MLB Draft League. He is a member of eight Halls of Fame. Manto played in Major League Baseball (MLB) for the Cleveland Indians, Philadelphia Phillies, Baltimore Orioles, Boston Red Sox, Seattle Mariners, Detroit Tigers, New York Yankees, and Colorado Rockies. He also played in Nippon Professional Baseball (NPB) for the Yomiuri Giants.

== Early career ==
Manto attended Temple University, where he accepted a full scholarship as a right-handed pitcher. After his freshman year, Manto was converted to a right fielder. During his Temple career, Manto had a career batting average of .412. He also held Owl records for total bases, extra base hits, home run percentage and slugging percentage. He was inducted into the Temple University Hall of Fame in 2000 and finished his degree in 2024. Manto was drafted in the 35th round of the 1982 Major League Baseball draft by the New York Yankees as a pitcher, but opted not to sign with them. Three years later, he entered again into the draft where he was drafted in the 14th round of the 1985 Major League Baseball draft by the California Angels and signed on June 7, 1985.

== Professional career ==
=== Playing career ===
Manto was drafted by the Angels in 1985. He played 16 years and retired after the 2000 season. During that span, Manto was part of three teams that reached the World Series: the 1993 Philadelphia Phillies (lost), the 1997 Cleveland Indians (lost), and the 1999 New York Yankees (won, but not on the roster).

Manto's nickname in his playing days was "Mickey".

Manto won the Texas League Most Valuable Player in 1988 and the International League Most Valuable Player Award. In 1994, a season in which he played for both the Norfolk Tides and the Rochester Red Wings, he won the International League Most Valuable Player.

Manto tied a major league record with four consecutive home runs in four consecutive official at bats.

Though Manto's stay in Rochester was brief, he forever made a name for himself in franchise history. In the winter of 1995, the city of Rochester was at risk of losing the franchise. Governor George Pataki had denied the city the funds needed to build a new stadium and keep the Red Wings in town. When team owners staged a rally called "StadiumStock," Jeff, along with his father Michael, drove from Philadelphia through a massive snowstorm to attend the rally. Manto spoke at great length of his passion for the city, its fans, and the Silver family, which ran the Red Wings. The rally was successful and funding was restored. Manto made the Orioles team the following spring. After Baltimore let him go the following winter, Manto signed on with the Yomiuri Giants in Japan, but struggled. He was released. Though he called Baltimore several times about signing a minor league deal, Syd Thrift, Baltimore's general manager, declined. Manto ended up in Syracuse and then Buffalo. However, Baltimore's decision not to bring back Manto to Rochester after what he did to help keep the franchise intact inflicted a wound that never healed, and the once warm relationship between Rochester and Baltimore began to show chinks in the armor.

Manto's most sustained run with one team was as a member of the Buffalo Bisons, at the time the Indians' Class AAA affiliate. In four interrupted years (1997–2000) with the Bisons, Manto hit 79 home runs. For his achievements, Manto's number 30 was retired by the Bisons, one of only three Bisons players (Luke Easter and Ollie Carnegie being the others) to have earned the honor.

=== Coaching career ===
After Manto's playing career ended, he worked as a hitting coach, as well as manager for the Philadelphia Phillies’ Lakewood BlueClaws. Was hired as the Pittsburgh Pirates Hitting Coordinator in 2003 and then was named the Pittsburgh Pirates hitting coach in November 2005. He was the hitting coach for the Pirates for two seasons from 2006 to 2007. In 2006, Manto helped guide Freddy Sanchez to the National League batting title with a .344 batting average. Also during his time as the Pirates hitting coach, Manto saw the future breakout potential of then-Pirate José Bautista. According to Keith Olbermann, Manto had said of Bautista, "If we can get him to replicate his swing three days in a row, José Bautista could hit 25 homers a year. In fact, I think he could hit 40. He is just so easily frustrated when it doesn’t go right that he blames himself and forgets what he's learned. Or ignores it. But of all these guys I have, if you want one of them who will eventually do something special in this game, I’d pick him. I wouldn’t be very surprised."

On October 31, 2011, Manto was named hitting coach for the Chicago White Sox where he helped guide Adam Dunn to an American League Sporting News Comeback Player of the Year Award in 2012.

He served as the Minor League Hitting Coordinator for the Baltimore Orioles from 2014 through 2019.

On April 12, 2021, Manto was announced as the manager of the Trenton Thunder for the inaugural season of the MLB Draft League.

== Honors ==
Manto is a member of 8 Halls of Fame:

- Bristol High School
- Bucks County, Pennsylvania
- Temple University
- Pennsylvania Sports
- Buffalo Bisons
- Rochester Red Wings
- Greater Buffalo
- International League
