= Jerry Browne =

American baseball player (born 1966)

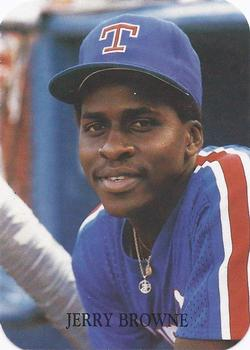
- Second baseman
- Born: February 13, 1966 (age 60); Christiansted, United States Virgin Islands
- Batted: Switch Threw: Right

MLB debut
- September 6, 1986, for the Texas Rangers

Last MLB appearance
- October 1, 1995, for the Florida Marlins

MLB statistics
- Batting average: .271
- Home runs: 23
- Runs batted in: 288
- Stats at Baseball Reference

Teams
- Texas Rangers (1986–1988); Cleveland Indians (1989–1991); Oakland Athletics (1992–1993); Florida Marlins (1994–1995)

Jerome Austin Browne (born February 13, 1966), nicknamed "the Governor", is an American former second baseman who played ten seasons in Major League Baseball (MLB). He also worked as a hitting coach for the Syracuse Chiefs.

Browne's best season was 1989, when he batted .299 for the Cleveland Indians with 31 doubles and 14 stolen bases.
