= Joel Skinner =

American baseball player (born 1961)

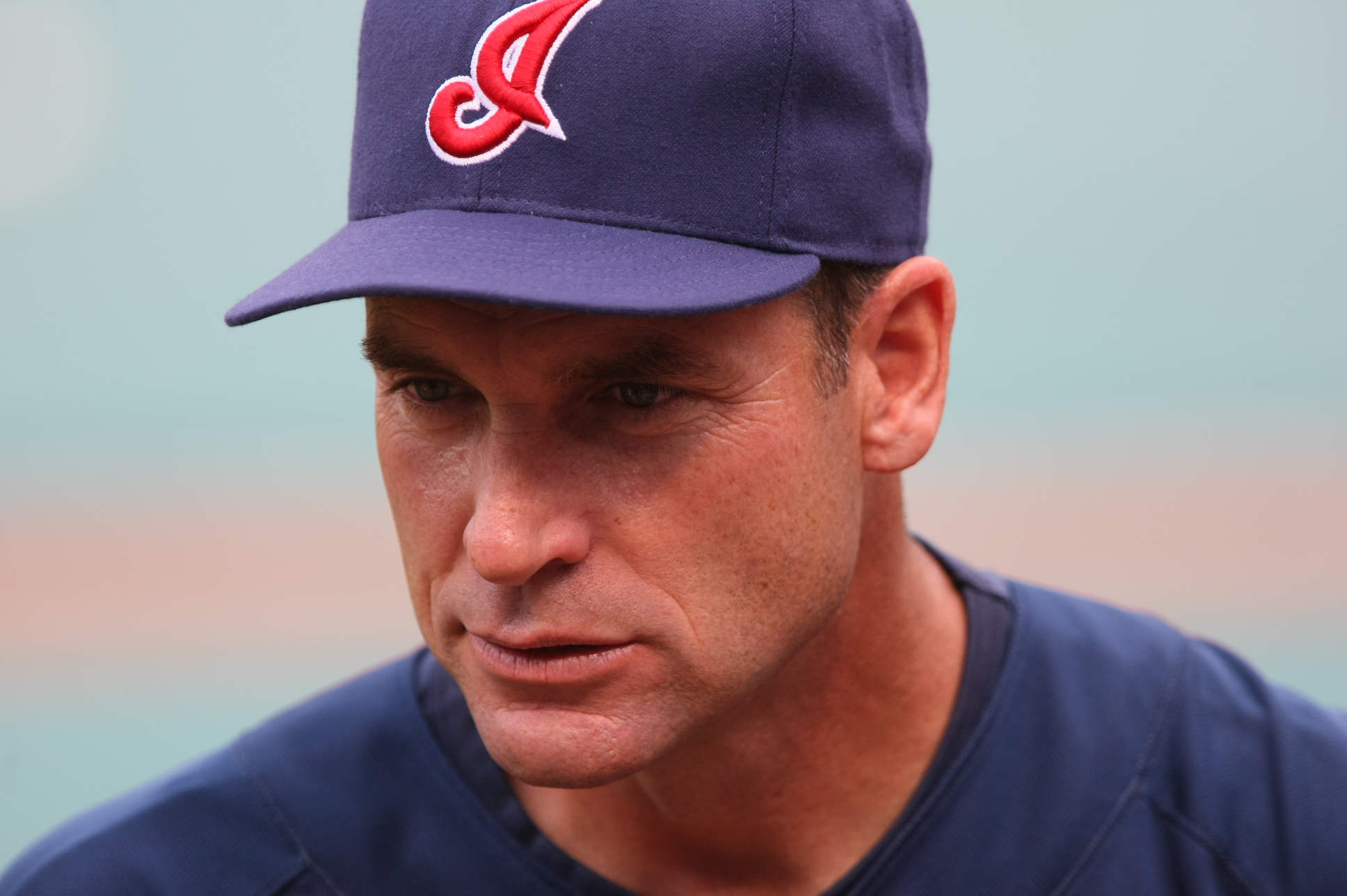
- Joel Skinner in 2009
- Catcher
- Born: February 21, 1961 (age 65); San Diego, California, U.S.
- Batted: Right Threw: Right

MLB debut
- June 12, 1983, for the Chicago White Sox

Last MLB appearance
- September 22, 1991, for the Cleveland Indians

MLB statistics
- Batting average: .228
- Home runs: 17
- Runs batted in: 136
- Stats at Baseball Reference

Teams
- As player: Chicago White Sox (1983–1986); New York Yankees (1986–1988); Cleveland Indians (1989–1991); As manager: Cleveland Indians (2002); As coach: Cleveland Indians (2001–2009); Oakland Athletics (2011)

Joel Patrick Skinner (born February 21, 1961) is an American former professional baseball manager, coach, and catcher in Major League Baseball (MLB). Skinner mostly has managed at the minor-league level, save for one half of one season at the helm of the 2002 Cleveland Indians. He is the son of Bob Skinner, a National League outfielder in the 1950s and 1960s, and himself a former MLB coach and skipper.

In 2018, Skinner became the manager of the Rochester Red Wings, the Triple-A affiliate of the Minnesota Twins. He was replaced by Toby Gardenhire for the 2020 season.

== High school career ==
At Mission Bay High School in San Diego, Skinner played baseball and water polo. He was drafted following his senior year and was the first player taken in the free-agent compensation draft.

== Major league playing career ==
Skinner was drafted by the Pittsburgh Pirates in the 37th round (842nd overall) of the 1979 Major League Baseball draft. He played two minor league seasons in the Pirates organization before he was acquired by the Chicago White Sox on February 2, 1982.

Skinner made his major league debut on June 12, 1983 against the Oakland Athletics, appearing as a defensive replacement at catcher in the ninth inning. He also recorded his first career at bat in the game, grounding out to pitcher Mike Warren in the 10th inning. After brief call-ups to the majors over the next three years, Skinner was slated to start 1986 with the White Sox.

New general manager Hawk Harrelson had taken a liking to Skinner, and decided to make him the starting catcher in place of Carlton Fisk. This made some sense on paper; Fisk was 38 years old, and conventional wisdom then as now held that catchers at that age don't have many years left. Harrelson wanted to have Fisk's successor in place when Fisk retired. To ease the transition, Fisk was moved to left field. The move backfired when Skinner batted only .171 in April. On May 10, Fisk became the regular catcher, and Skinner only made 25 more starts behind the plate before being traded to the New York Yankees on July 30.

After the trade to the New York, Skinner bounced between the majors and minors with the Yankees and Cleveland Indians until he retired as a player on May 18, 1994. The Indians immediately named him a minor league instructor upon his retirement.

== Minor league managing career ==
Skinner spent six seasons managing in the Indians minor league system from 1995–2000. Overall, he compiled a record of 448–333 (.574) and took his teams to the playoffs in five of six seasons. In 1995, Skinner managed the Watertown Indians to a record of 46–27 and a New York–Penn League title, and received Manager of the Year honors. With the Columbus Redstixx (South Atlantic League) in 1996, he managed them to a second half title and a regular season record of 79–63. In 1997, Skinner managed the Class A Kinston Indians (Carolina League) as they won titles in both the first and second halves with an 87–53 record overall, earning him Carolina League Manager of the Year honors. From 1998 through 1999, Skinner managed the Akron Aeros and was named USA Today Baseball Weekly's Minor League Manager of the Year in 1998, after guiding the Aeros to an 81–60 record and an Eastern League regular season title. Skinner then managed the Triple-A Buffalo Bisons to the best record in the International League in 2000, including an IL North Division title with a record of 86–59 (.593). His leadership of the Bisons in earned him Minor League Manager of the Year honors from Baseball America and The Sporting News in addition to being given International League Manager of the Year honors. That same season Skinner was a coach for Team USA in the 2000 All-Star Futures Game in Atlanta.

In 2011, Skinner was hired as the manager of the Charlotte Knights, the White Sox Triple-A affiliate, for the 2012 season.

In 2016, Skinner was the manager of the Winston-Salem Dash of the Carolina League.

On January 17, 2018, Skinner was named as the 45th manager of the International League's Rochester Red Wings, the Triple-A affiliate of the Minnesota Twins. His contract was not renewed for the 2020 season and he was replaced by Toby Gardenhire.

== Major League managing/coaching career ==
Skinner was named to the coaching staff of the Cleveland Indians on November 10, 2000, succeeding Jim Riggleman as third base coach. He was named interim manager of the Tribe on July 11, 2002 after Charlie Manuel was let go in a contract dispute. At the time, Skinner was the youngest manager in the major leagues, at age 41. He skippered the team to a 35–41 record to finish the season, including a 15–13 record in September. Skinner's name was mentioned among candidates to the permanent manager's job, but Eric Wedge was chosen instead. Skinner remained on the Indians' coaching staff until the end of the 2009 season.

On October 20, 2010, Skinner was hired as the Oakland Athletics bench coach for the 2011 season, replacing Tye Waller. On September 30, 2011, it was announced that he would not be retained for the 2012 season.

== Managerial records ==
Team	Year	Regular season					Postseason			
Team	Year	Games	Won	Lost	Win %	Finish	Won	Lost	Win %	Result
CLE	2002	76	35	41	.461	3rd in AL Central	–	–	–	–
Total		76	35	41	.461		0	0	–	

== Career statistics ==
G	AB	R	H	RBI	HR	AVG
564	1441	119	329	136	17	.228

== See also ==
- List of second-generation Major League Baseball players

Preceded by Jim Riggleman; Jeff Datz; Jeff Datz	Cleveland Indians Third Base Coach; 2001–2002; 2003–2005; 2007–2009	Succeeded by Jeff Datz; Jeff Datz; Steve Smith
Preceded by Robby Thompson	Cleveland Indians Bench Coach; 2006	Succeeded by Jeff Datz
Preceded by Tye Waller	Oakland Athletics Bench Coach; 2010–2011	Succeeded by Chip Hale
