= 1990 Boston Red Sox season =

Major League Baseball season

1990 Boston Red Sox
- American League East champions
- League: American League
- Division: East
- Ballpark: Fenway Park
- City: Boston, Massachusetts
- Record: 88–74 (.543)
- Divisional place: 1st
- Owners: Jean Yawkey, Haywood Sullivan
- President: John Harrington
- General manager: Lou Gorman
- Manager: Joe Morgan
- Television: WSBK-TV, Ch. 38 (Sean McDonough, Bob Montgomery); NESN (Ned Martin, Jerry Remy)
- Radio: WRKO (Bob Starr, Joe Castiglione); WROL (Bobby Serrano, Hector Martinez)
- Stats: ESPN.com; Baseball Reference

The 1990 Boston Red Sox season was the 90th season in the franchise's Major League Baseball history. The Red Sox finished first in the American League East with a record of 88–74. It was the third AL East division championship in five years for the Red Sox. However, the team was defeated in a four-game sweep by the Oakland Athletics in the ALCS, as had been the case in 1988.

== Offseason ==
- November 13, 1989: The Red Sox waive Jim Rice.
- December 6, 1989: Dennis Lamp was signed as a free agent by the Red Sox.
- December 6, 1989: Jeff Reardon was signed as a free agent by the Red Sox.
- December 19, 1989: Rick Cerone was released by the Red Sox.
- December 20, 1989: Sam Horn was released by the Red Sox.

=== February ===
- February 5, 1990: Pitcher Eric Hetzel agrees to a one-year contract with the Red Sox; pitcher Joe Johnson and infielder Jim Pankovits agree to contracts with the Pawtucket Red Sox.
- February 6, 1990: First Base Coach Al Bumbry agrees to a one-year deal with the Red Sox.
- February 9, 1990: Pitcher Rob Murphy agreed to a two-year $1.75 million contract with the Red Sox.
- February 14, 1990: Bill Buckner agrees to a Triple-A Contract with the Red Sox.
- February 15, 1990: Greg A. Harris was signed as a free agent by the Red Sox.

== Regular season ==
Record by month
Month	Record		Cumulative		AL East		Ref.
Month	Won	Lost	Won	Lost	Position	GB	Ref.
April	11	8	11	8	2nd	1 1/2	
May	12	14	23	22	3rd	1	
June	20	9	43	31	1st	+3 1/2	
July	12	17	55	48	1st (tie)	—	
August	19	9	74	57	1st	+6 1/2	
September	12	16	86	73	1st	+1	
October	2	1	88	74	1st	+2	

=== Highlights ===
The Red Sox set a major league record, which still stands, for the most times grounding into a double play during a season, 174.

On June 6, the Red Sox got a measure of retribution for Bucky Dent's home run in the 1978 American League East tie-breaker game. While in Boston for a four-game series, the New York Yankees fired Dent as their manager. The Red Sox had just defeated the Yankees in the first two games of the series, giving the Yankees an 18–31 record, 8 1/2 games behind the first-place Red Sox. The firing made Fenway Park arguably the scene of Dent's best moment as a player and worst moment as manager. Although the Red Sox got retribution for Dent's home run, they, along with the Yankees, were shaken to the core by the firing and called it an outrage and blasted Yankees owner George Steinbrenner for firing Dent—his 18th managerial change in as many years—in Boston. Dan Shaughnessy of The Boston Globe criticized Steinbrenner and rhetorically asked if he couldn't have waited to fire Dent elsewhere. Shaughnessy noted, "if Dent had been fired in Seattle or Milwaukee, this would have been just another event in an endless line of George's jettisons. But it happened in Boston and the nightly news had its hook." Author Bill Pennington called the firing of Dent "merciless." However, Yankees television analyst Tony Kubek blasted at Steinbrenner for the firing in a harsh, angry way. At the beginning of the broadcast of the game on MSG Network, he said to Yankees television play-by-play announcer Dewayne Staats, "George Steinbrenner...mishandled this. You don't take a Bucky Dent (at) the site of one of the greatest home runs in Yankee history and fire him and make it a media circus for the Boston Red Sox." He then stared defiantly on camera and said to Steinbrenner, "You don't do it by telephone, either, George. You do it face to face, eyeball to eyeball...If you really are a winner, you should not have handled this like a loser." He then said, angrily, "George, you're a bully and a coward." He then said that "What all this does, it just wrecks George Steinbrenner's credibility with his players, with the front office and in baseball more than it already is–if that's possible. It was just mishandled."

=== Season standings ===
AL East
Team	W	L	Pct.	GB	Home	Road
Boston Red Sox	88	74	.543	—	51‍–‍30	37‍–‍44
Toronto Blue Jays	86	76	.531	2	44‍–‍37	42‍–‍39
Detroit Tigers	79	83	.488	9	39‍–‍42	40‍–‍41
Cleveland Indians	77	85	.475	11	41‍–‍40	36‍–‍45
Baltimore Orioles	76	85	.472	11½	40‍–‍40	36‍–‍45
Milwaukee Brewers	74	88	.457	14	39‍–‍42	35‍–‍46
New York Yankees	67	95	.414	21	37‍–‍44	30‍–‍51

=== Record vs. opponents ===
1990 American League record Sources:
Team	BAL	BOS	CAL	CWS	CLE	DET	KC	MIL	MIN	NYY	OAK	SEA	TEX	TOR
Baltimore	—	4–9	7–5	6–6	6–7	6–7	8–3	7–6	6–6	6–7	4–8	3–9	8–4	5–8
Boston	9–4	—	7–5	6–6	9–4	8–5	4–8	5–8	4–8	9–4	4–8	8–4	5–7	10–3
California	5–7	5–7	—	5–8	7–5	5–7	7–6	7–5	9–4	6–6	4–9	5–8	8–5	7–5
Chicago	6–6	6–6	8–5	—	5–7	5–7	9–4	10–2	7–6	10–2	8–5	8–5	7–6	5–7
Cleveland	7–6	4–9	5–7	7–5	—	5–8	6–6	9–4	7–5	5–8	4–8	7–5	7–5	4–9
Detroit	7–6	5–8	7–5	7–5	8–5	—	5–7	3–10	6–6	7–6	6–6	7–5	6–6	5–8
Kansas City	3–8	8–4	6–7	4–9	6–6	7–5	—	4–8	8–5	8–4	4–9	7–6	5–8	5–7
Milwaukee	6–7	8–5	5–7	2–10	4–9	10–3	8–4	—	4–8	6–7	5–7	4–8	5–7	7–6
Minnesota	6–6	8–4	4–9	6–7	5–7	6–6	5–8	8–4	—	6–6	6–7	6–7	5–8	3–9
New York	7–6	4–9	6–6	2–10	8–5	6–7	4–8	7–6	6–6	—	0–12	9–3	3–9	5–8
Oakland	8–4	8–4	9–4	5–8	8–4	6–6	9–4	7–5	7–6	12–0	—	9–4	8–5	7–5
Seattle	9–3	4–8	8–5	5–8	5–7	5–7	6–7	8–4	7–6	3–9	4–9	—	7–6	6–6
Texas	4–8	7–5	5–8	6–7	5–7	6–6	8–5	7–5	8–5	9–3	5–8	6–7	—	7–5
Toronto	8–5	3–10	5–7	7–5	9–4	8–5	7–5	6–7	9–3	8–5	5–7	6–6	5–7	—

=== Notable transactions ===
- May 4, 1990: Lee Smith was traded by the Red Sox to the St. Louis Cardinals for Tom Brunansky.
- June 4, 1990: Les Norman was selected by the Red Sox in the 26th round of the 1990 MLB draft, but did not sign.
- June 5, 1990: Bill Buckner was released by the Red Sox.
- June 8, 1990: Rich Gedman was sent to the Houston Astros as part of a conditional deal.
- August 23, 1990: Cecilio Guante signed as a free agent with the Red Sox.
- August 30, 1990: The Red Sox traded Jeff Bagwell to the Houston Astros for Larry Andersen.

=== Opening Day lineup ===
26	Wade Boggs	3B
17	Marty Barrett	2B
39	Mike Greenwell	LF
12	Ellis Burks	CF
24	Dwight Evans	DH
13	Billy Jo Robidoux	1B
6	Tony Peña	C
3	Jody Reed	SS
16	Kevin Romine	RF
21	Roger Clemens	P

=== Red Sox debuts ===
Player	Position	Date	Game	Source
Tony Peña	Catcher	4/9/1990	Vs. Detroit Tigers	
Billy Jo Robidoux	First Base	4/9/1990	Vs. Detroit Tigers	
Jeff Reardon	Pitcher	4/17/1990	@ Chicago White Sox	
Dana Kiecker	Pitcher	4/12/1990	@ Detroit Tigers	
Daryl Irvine	Pitcher	4/28/1990	Vs. Oakland Athletics	
Jerry Reed	Pitcher	5/4/1990	@ Oakland Athletics	
Tom Brunansky	Right Field	5/6/1990	@ Oakland Athletics	
Jeff Gray	Pitcher	6/10/1990	Vs. Cleveland Indians	
Tim Naehring	Second Base	7/15/1990	Vs. Kansas City Royals	
Joe Hesketh	Pitcher	8/3/1990	Vs. Detroit Tigers	
Rick Lancellotti	Pinch Hitter	8/10/1990	@ Seattle Mariners	
Mike Marshall	Designated Hitter	8/20/1990	Vs. Baltimore Orioles	
Phil Plantier	Pinch Hitter	8/21/1990	Vs. Baltimore Orioles	
Larry Andersen	Pitcher	9/2/1990	Vs. New York Yankees	
Scott Cooper	Pinch Hitter	9/5/1990	@ Oakland Athletics	
Jim Pankovits	Second Base	9/17/1990	@ Chicago White Sox	

=== Alumni game ===
The team held an old-timers game on May 19, before a scheduled home game against the Minnesota Twins. Red Sox alumni pitchers Bill Lee, Bill Monbouquette, and Dick Radatz allowed just one hit (to former Detroit Tiger Willie Horton) in the four-inning game, as Boston won by a 2–0 score over a team of MLB alumni from other clubs.

=== Roster ===
1990 Boston Red Sox
**Roster**
**Pitchers**: 40,48 Larry Andersen; 52 Mike Boddicker; 50 Tom Bolton; 21 Roger Clemens; 40 John Dopson; 44 Wes Gardner; 38 Jeff Gray; 27 Greg Harris; 55 Joe Hesketh; 31 Eric Hetzel; 59 Daryl Irvine; 19 Dana Kiecker; 15 Dennis Lamp; 38 John Leister; 47 Rob Murphy; 41 Jeff Reardon; 3,45 Jerry Reed; 54 Mike Rochford; 48 Lee Smith	**Catchers**: 10 Rich Gedman; 20 John Marzano; 6 Tony Peña; **Infielders**: 17 Marty Barrett; 26 Wade Boggs; 22 Bill Buckner; 10 Rick Lancellotti; 11 Tim Naehring; 42 Jim Pankovits; 18 Carlos Quintana; 3 Jody Reed; 2 Luis Rivera; 13 Billy Jo Robidoux	**Outfielders**: 23 Tom Brunansky; 12 Ellis Burks; 39 Mike Greenwell; 29 Danny Heep; 5 Randy Kutcher; 7 Phil Plantier; 16 Kevin Romine; **Designated Hitters**: 24 Dwight Evans; 22 Mike Marshall; 28 Jeff Stone; **Pinch hitter**: 45 Scott Cooper	**Manager**: 35 Joe Morgan; **Coaches**: 33 Dick Berardino (bullpen); 37 Al Bumbry (first base); 34 Bill Fischer (pitching); 32 Richie Hebner (hitting); 36 Rac Slider (third base)

=== Game log ===
Past games legend
Red Sox Win (#bfb)	Red Sox Loss (#fbb)	Game postponed (#bbb)	All-Star Game (#bbcaff)	Clinched Division (#039)
Bold denotes a Red Sox pitcher

1990 Regular Season Game Log (88–74) (Home: 51–30; Road: 37–44)
April (11–8) (Home: 9–4; Road: 2–4)

#	Date	Opponent	Score	Win	Loss	Save	Crowd	Record	Streak
—	April 2	@ Tigers	Postponed (lockout); Makeup: April 12						
—	April 4	@ Tigers	Postponed (lockout); Makeup: July 19						
—	April 5	@ Tigers	Postponed (lockout); Makeup: September 27						
—	April 6	White Sox	Postponed (lockout); Makeup: October 1						
—	April 7	White Sox	Postponed (lockout); Makeup: October 2						
—	April 8	White Sox	Postponed (lockout); Makeup: October 3						
1	April 9	Tigers	5–2	**Clemens** (1–0)	Morris (0–1)	**Smith** (1)	35,199	1–0	W1
2	April 10	Tigers	4–2	**Boddicker** (1–0)	Ritz (0–1)	**Smith** (2)	15,352	2–0	W2
3	April 11	Tigers	3–2 (10)	**Harris** (1–0)	Gleaton (0–1)		15,369	3–0	W3
4	April 12	@ Tigers	7–11	Lugo (1–0)	**Rochford** (0–1)		44,906	3–1	L1
5	April 13	Brewers	5–9	Crim (1–0)	**Murphy** (0–1)		22,731	3–2	L2
6	April 14	Brewers	4–3	**Clemens** (2–0)	August (0–1)	**Smith** (3)	31,571	4–2	W1
—	April 15	Brewers	Postponed (Rain); Makeup: September 10						
7	April 16	Brewers	0–18	Higuera (1–0)	**Boddicker** (1–1)		35,478	4–3	L1
8	April 17	@ White Sox	1–2	Jones (2–0)	**Smith** (0–1)		8,479	4–4	L2
9	April 18	@ White Sox	7–5	**Clemens** (3–0)	McDowell (0–1)	**Smith** (4)	10,570	5–4	W1
10	April 20	@ Brewers	0–5	Filer (1–1)	**Boddicker** (1–2)	Crim (1)	15,334	5–5	L1
11	April 21	@ Brewers	0–2	Higuera (2–0)	**Hetzel** (0–1)		19,391	5–6	L2
12	April 22	@ Brewers	4–2 (11)	**Smith** (1–1)	Plesac (0–1)		26,741	6–6	W1
13	April 24	Angels	4–2	**Clemens** (4–0)	Langston (1–1)	**Reardon** (1)	24,362	7–6	W2
14	April 25	Angels	1–3	McCaskill (2–0)	**Boddicker** (1–3)	Eichhorn (4)	19,843	7–7	L1
15	April 26	Angels	5–4	**Smith** (2–1)	Harvey (1–1)		22,601	8–7	W1
16	April 27	Athletics	7–6	**Reardon** (1–0)	Nelson (1–1)		32,912	9–7	W2
17	April 28	Athletics	12–3	**Harris** (2–0)	Young (0–1)		33,989	10–7	W3
18	April 29	Athletics	0–1	Stewart (5–0)	**Clemens** (4–1)	Eckersley (7)	33,237	10–8	L1
19	April 30	Mariners	11–0	**Boddicker** (2–3)	Holman (3–2)		18,540	11–8	W1

May (12–14) (Home: 4–5; Road: 8–9)

#	Date	Opponent	Score	Win	Loss	Save	Crowd	Record	Streak
20	May 1	Mariners	8–2	**Hetzel** (1–1)	Johnson (2–2)		20,786	12–8	W2
21	May 2	Mariners	2–9	Hanson (3–0)	**Harris** (2–1)		23,977	12–9	L1
22	May 4	@ Athletics	3–8	Stewart (6–0)	**Clemens** (4–2)		43,894	12–10	L2
23	May 5	@ Athletics	5–1	**Boddicker** (3–3)	Welch (3–2)		41,850	13–10	W1
24	May 6	@ Athletics	2–4	Young (1–1)	**Hetzel** (1–2)	Eckersley (9)	44,008	13–11	L1
25	May 7	@ Mariners	5–4	**Harris** (3–1)	Hanson (3–1)	**Murphy** (1)	19,549	14–11	W1
26	May 8	@ Mariners	1–2	Swift (2–0)	**Gardner** (0–1)		11,503	14–12	L1
27	May 9	@ Mariners	4–1	**Clemens** (5–2)	Eave (0–3)		14,192	15–12	W1
28	May 11	@ Angels	3–2	**Boddicker** (4–3)	Eichhorn (0–3)	**Reardon** (2)	33,418	16–12	W2
29	May 12	@ Angels	7–1	**Harris** (4–1)	Blyleven (1–3)		50,755	17–12	W3
30	May 13	@ Angels	4–8	Finley (5–2)	**Lamp** (0–1)	Harvey (3)	34,399	17–13	L1
31	May 14	@ Royals	5–9 (10)	M. Davis (1–2)	**Reardon** (1–1)		32,763	17–14	L2
—	May 15	@ Royals	Postponed (Rain); Makeup: July 20						
32	May 16	@ Royals	7–1	**Boddicker** (5–3)	Gordon (1–1)		21,887	18–14	W1
33	May 18	Twins	0–6	Candelaria (4–1)	**Harris** (4–2)		31,779	18–15	L1
34	May 19	Twins	13–1	**Clemens** (6–2)	Anderson (2–5)		34,145	19–15	W1
35	May 20	Twins	4–5	Smith (2–4)	**Hetzel** (1–3)	Aguilera (11)	33,141	19–16	L1
36	May 21	Rangers	4–2	**Boddicker** (6–3)	Mielke (0–1)	**Reardon** (3)	22,359	20–16	W1
37	May 22	Rangers	4–5	Witt (2–5)	**Kiecker** (0–1)	Jeff Russell (7)	23,193	20–17	L1
38	May 23	Royals	1–4	Saberhagen (3–3)	**Harris** (4–3)		22,468	20–18	L2
39	May 24	Royals	4–1	**Clemens** (7–2)	Gubicza (2–5)		31,982	21–18	W1
40	May 25	@ Twins	0–16	Smith (3–4)	**Hetzel** (1–4)		31,564	21–19	L1
41	May 26	@ Twins	5–6	Candelaria (5–1)	**Murphy** (0–2)	Aguilera (12)	32,048	21–20	L2
42	May 27	@ Twins	1–3	Tapani (6–3)	**Kiecker** (0–2)	Aguilera (13)	28,173	21–21	L3
43	May 28	@ Rangers	4–3	**Jerry Reed** (1–1)	Jeff Russell (1–5)	**Reardon** (4)	16,128	22–21	W1
44	May 29	@ Rangers	2–1	**Clemens** (8–2)	Hough (5–3)	**Reardon** (5)	27,185	23–21	W2
45	May 30	@ Rangers	3–4 (10)	Rogers (2–1)	**Gardner** (0–2)		15,445	23–22	L1

June (20–9) (Home: 13–4; Road: 7–5)

#	Date	Opponent	Score	Win	Loss	Save	Crowd	Record	Streak
46	June 1	@ Indians	4–3	**Jerry Reed** (2–1)	Jones (0–2)	**Reardon** (6)	23,833	24–22	W1
47	June 2	@ Indians	5–7	S. Valdez (2–1)	**Murphy** (0–3)	Jones (18)	33,569	24–23	L1
48	June 3	@ Indians	8–2	**Clemens** (9–2)	Farrell (3–3)		29,137	25–23	W1
49	June 4	Yankees	5–3	**Reardon** (2–1)	Robinson (0–4)		32,125	26–23	W2
50	June 5	Yankees	9–8	**Reardon** (3–1)	Plunk (2–2)	**Jerry Reed** (1)	32,919	27–23	W3
51	June 6	Yankees	4–1	**Boddicker** (7–3)	LaPoint (4–5)		33,385	28–23	W4
52	June 7	Yankees	3–0	**Harris** (5–3)	Leary (3–7)	**Reardon** (7)	33,454	29–23	W5
53	June 8	Indians	4–3	**Clemens** (10–2)	Farrell (3–4)	**Reardon** (8)	34,222	30–23	W6
54	June 9	Indians	11–6	**Kiecker** (1–2)	S. Valdez (2–2)	**Jerry Reed** (2)	32,991	31–23	W7
55	June 10	Indians	0–4	Candiotti (6–3)	**Gardner** (0–3)	Jones (19)	33,961	31–24	L1
56	June 11	Indians	3–4 (12)	Seánez (1–0)	**Lamp** (0–2)	Jones (20)	30,404	31–25	L2
57	June 12	@ Yankees	4–5	Guetterman (3–2)	**Murphy** (0–4)	Righetti (12)	31,706	31–26	L3
58	June 13	@ Yankees	4–1	**Clemens** (11–2)	Leary (3–8)	**Reardon** (9)	28,623	32–26	W1
59	June 14	@ Yankees	1–3	Cary (3–2)	**Kiecker** (1–3)	Righetti (13)	27,073	32–27	L1
60	June 15	@ Orioles	4–3	**Gardner** (1–3)	Harnisch (6–3)	**Reardon** (10)	45,503	33–27	W1
61	June 16	@ Orioles	6–3	**Boddicker** (8–3)	Mitchell (0–1)		42,837	34–27	W2
62	June 17	@ Orioles	6–5	**Harris** (6–3)	Ballard (1–7)	**Murphy** (2)	47,534	35–27	W3
63	June 18	@ Orioles	2–7	Johnson (6–4)	**Clemens** (11–3)		31,582	35–28	L1
64	June 19	@ Blue Jays	4–2	**Kiecker** (2–3)	Ward (1–3)	**Murphy** (3)	49,907	36–28	W1
65	June 20	@ Blue Jays	0–11	Stieb (10–2)	**Gardner** (1–4)	Henke (11)	49,857	36–29	L1
66	June 22	Orioles	4–3	**Boddicker** (9–3)	Ballard (1–8)	**Murphy** (4)	34,711	37–29	W1
67	June 23	Orioles	4–3 (10)	**Gray** (1–0)	Olson (3–2)		33,767	38–29	W2
68	June 24	Orioles	2–0	**Harris** (7–3)	Milacki (3–4)	**Gray** (1)	34,125	39–29	W3
69	June 25	Blue Jays	10–8	**Lamp** (1–2)	Blair (0–5)	**Reardon** (11)	32,591	40–29	W4
70	June 26	Blue Jays	3–0	**Gardner** (2–4)	Wells (5–2)	**Reardon** (12)	23,244	41–29	W5
71	June 27	Blue Jays	9–5	**Boddicker** (10–3)	Key (4–3)	**Gray** (2)	32,961	42–29	W6
72	June 28	Blue Jays	4–3	**Clemens** (12–3)	Stottlemyre (8–7)	**Reardon** (13)	34,547	43–29	W7
73	June 29	Rangers	3–4	Barfield (1–0)	**Gray** (1–1)		33,083	43–30	L1
74	June 30	Rangers	5–6	Jeffcoat (2–3)	**Reardon** (3–2)	Rogers (5)	33,184	43–31	L2

July (12–17) (Home: 7–4; Road: 5–13)

#	Date	Opponent	Score	Win	Loss	Save	Crowd	Record	Streak
75	July 1	Rangers	15–4	**Bolton** (1–0)	Brown (9–6)		33,825	44–31	W1
76	July 2	Rangers	3–2	**Boddicker** (11–3)	Rogers (2–4)		35,096	45–31	W2
77	July 3	@ Twins	3–7	Tapani (9–5)	**Clemens** (12–4)	Aguilera (19)	20,521	45–32	L1
78	July 4	@ Twins	4–3	**Lamp** (2–2)	Aguilera (2–2)	**Reardon** (14)	23,604	46–32	W1
79	July 5	@ Twins	4–7	Drummond (1–3)	**Murphy** (0–5)	Aguilera (20)	18,473	46–33	L1
80	July 6	@ Rangers	0–4	Brown (10–6)	**Gardner** (2–5)		32,540	46–34	L2
81	July 7	@ Rangers	4–7	Ryan (8–4)	**Boddicker** (11–4)	Rogers (7)	41,773	46–35	L3
82	July 8	@ Rangers	3–4 (11)	Rogers (3–4)	**Gray** (1–2)		26,819	46–36	L4
ASG	July 10	AL @ NL	2–0	Saberhagen (1–0)	Brantley (0–1)	Eckersley (1)	55,837	—	N/A
—	July 12	Royals	Postponed (Rain); Makeup: July 14						
83	July 13	Royals	3–5	Gordon (6–6)	**Boddicker** (11–5)	Montgomery (9)	34,701	46–37	L5
84	July 14	Royals	1–2	Aquino (4–0)	**Murphy** (0–6)	Montgomery (10)	34,287	46–38	L6
85	July 14	Royals	8–7	**Bolton** (2–0)	Baller (0–1)	**Reardon** (15)	27,163	47–38	W1
86	July 15	Royals	4–13	Crawford (3–1)	**Kiecker** (2–4)		34,054	47–39	L1
87	July 16	Twins	2–3	Berenguer (7–2)	**Gray** (1–3)	Aguilera (22)	33,445	47–40	L2
88	July 17	Twins	1–0	**Bolton** (3–0)	Erickson (1–2)	**Reardon** (16)	34,113	48–40	W1
89	July 18	Twins	5–4	**Lamp** (3–2)	Berenguer (7–3)	**Reardon** (17)	34,838	49–40	W2
90	July 19	@ Tigers	0–1	Robinson (7–7)	**Harris** (7–4)	Gleaton (3)	12,678	49–41	L1
91	July 20	@ Royals	0–5	Appier (5–3)	**Clemens** (12–5)		–	49–42	L2
92	July 20	@ Royals	3–1	**Kiecker** (3–4)	Aquino (4–1)	**Reardon** (18)	36,750	50–42	W1
93	July 21	@ Royals	2–4	Farr (7–4)	**Reardon** (3–3)	Montgomery (12)	35,600	50–43	L1
94	July 22	@ Royals	1–2	S. Davis (4–6)	**Bolton** (3–1)	Montgomery (13)	33,255	50–44	L2
95	July 23	@ Brewers	0–13	Knudson (8–4)	**Boddicker** (11–6)		20,980	50–45	L3
96	July 24	@ Brewers	5–6 (10)	Plesac (2–3)	**Jerry Reed** (2–2)		24,718	50–46	L4
97	July 25	@ Brewers	2–0	**Clemens** (13–5)	Bosio (4–8)		35,948	51–46	W1
98	July 26	@ Tigers	4–10	Petry (8–6)	**Gardner** (2–6)		20,564	51–47	L1
99	July 27	@ Tigers	1–0	**Bolton** (4–1)	Morris (8–13)	**Murphy** (5)	27,556	52–47	W1
100	July 28	@ Tigers	9–17	Gibson (3–2)	**Lamp** (3–3)		39,727	52–48	L1
101	July 29	@ Tigers	13–3	**Harris** (8–4)	Robinson (8–8)		28,631	53–48	W1
102	July 30	White Sox	3–0	**Clemens** (14–5)	Peterson (1–3)		35,599	54–48	W2
103	July 31	White Sox	7–2	**Kiecker** (4–4)	King (8–4)		33,033	55–48	W3

August (19–9) (Home: 7–4; Road: 12–5)

#	Date	Opponent	Score	Win	Loss	Save	Crowd	Record	Streak
104	August 1	White Sox	9–5	**Bolton** (5–1)	McDowell (6–6)		35,522	56–48	W4
105	August 3	Tigers	14–5	**Harris** (9–4)	Robinson (8–9)		34,713	57–48	W5
106	August 4	Tigers	3–1	**Clemens** (15–5)	Searcy (1–3)	**Murphy** (6)	34,857	58–48	W6
107	August 5	Tigers	2–7	Petry (9–7)	**Boddicker** (11–7)	Gleaton (5)	34,581	58–49	L1
108	August 7	@ Angels	6–3	**Bolton** (6–1)	Langston (5–14)	**Murphy** (7)	29,262	59–49	W1
109	August 8	@ Angels	6–8 (11)	Fraser (3–3)	**Lamp** (3–4)		29,362	59–50	L1
110	August 9	@ Angels	14–3	**Clemens** (16–5)	Abbott (7–10)		32,802	60–50	W1
111	August 10	@ Mariners	1–4	Johnson (10–7)	**Kiecker** (4–5)	Schooler (29)	20,506	60–51	L1
112	August 11	@ Mariners	4–2 (14)	**Irvine** (1–0)	Schooler (1–4)		30,113	61–51	W1
113	August 12	@ Mariners	7–2	**Bolton** (7–1)	Jackson (5–4)		25,553	62–51	W2
114	August 13	@ Athletics	0–4	Sanderson (12–7)	**Harris** (9–5)		34,758	62–52	L1
115	August 14	@ Athletics	2–0	**Clemens** (17–5)	Moore (10–11)		38,009	63–52	W1
116	August 15	@ Athletics	2–6 (10)	Stewart (17–8)	**Irvine** (1–1)		41,704	63–53	L1
117	August 17	Angels	0–1	Finley (16–5)	**Boddicker** (11–8)		35,107	63–54	L2
118	August 18	Angels	3–4	McCaskill (9–8)	**Bolton** (7–2)	Harvey (15)	34,131	63–55	L3
119	August 19	Angels	4–1	**Clemens** (18–5)	Abbott (8–11)	**Gray** (3)	33,365	64–55	W1
120	August 20	Orioles	2–1	**Harris** (10–5)	Harnisch (9–8)	**Gray** (4)	35,060	65–55	W2
121	August 21	Orioles	5–9	Mitchell (6–5)	**Kiecker** (4–6)	Olson (29)	35,022	65–56	L1
122	August 22	Orioles	13–2	**Boddicker** (12–8)	McDonald (5–2)		35,189	66–56	W1
123	August 23	@ Blue Jays	3–4	Henke (1–2)	**Hesketh** (0–1)		49,918	66–57	L1
124	August 24	@ Blue Jays	2–0	**Kiecker** (5–6)	Ward (2–7)	**Gray** (5)	49,914	67–57	W1
125	August 25	@ Blue Jays	1–0	**Clemens** (19–5)	Wells (9–4)		49,890	68–57	W2
126	August 26	@ Blue Jays	1–0	**Harris** (11–5)	Stottlemyre (11–14)	**Gray** (6)	49,897	69–57	W3
127	August 27	@ Indians	12–4	**Boddicker** (13–8)	Candiotti (13–9)		10,411	70–57	W4
128	August 28	@ Indians	6–5	**Gardner** (3–6)	Jones (4–3)	**Gray** (7)	10,799	71–57	W5
129	August 29	@ Indians	7–1	**Kiecker** (6–6)	Walker (1–4)		8,862	72–57	W6
130	August 30	@ Indians	9–2	**Clemens** (20–5)	Jones (4–4)		9,651	73–57	W7
131	August 31	Yankees	7–3	**Harris** (12–5)	Cary (5–9)	**Gray** (8)	34,464	74–57	W8

September (12–16) (Home: 9–8; Road: 3–8)

#	Date	Opponent	Score	Win	Loss	Save	Crowd	Record	Streak
132	September 1	Yankees	15–1	**Boddicker** (14–8)	Hawkins (5–11)		34,482	75–57	W9
133	September 2	Yankees	7–1	**Bolton** (8–2)	Witt (3–7)		35,458	76–57	W10
134	September 3	Athletics	5–9	Sanderson (14–9)	**Kiecker** (6–7)		34,692	76–58	L1
135	September 4	Athletics	2–6	Stewart (18–10)	**Clemens** (20–6)		35,408	76–59	L2
136	September 5	Athletics	0–10	Welch (23–5)	**Harris** (12–6)		33,156	76–60	L3
137	September 7	Mariners	5–4 (11)	**Gray** (2–3)	Jackson (5–7)		32,868	77–60	W1
138	September 8	Mariners	10–2	**Bolton** (9–2)	Medvin (0–1)		32,680	78–60	W2
139	September 9	Mariners	1–3	Young (8–14)	**Hesketh** (0–2)	Swift (5)	33,923	78–61	L1
140	September 10	Brewers	5–4	**Harris** (13–6)	Knudson (10–9)	**Gray** (9)	–	79–61	W1
141	September 10	Brewers	1–6	Edens (4–2)	**Kiecker** (6–8)	Crim (11)	28,757	79–62	L1
142	September 11	Brewers	2–4	Robinson (10–3)	**Gardner** (3–7)	Plesac (23)	27,778	79–63	L2
143	September 12	Brewers	6–1	**Boddicker** (15–8)	Higuera (10–7)		29,098	80–63	W1
144	September 13	@ White Sox	6–9	Fernandez (3–3)	**Bolton** (9–3)	Patterson (2)	27,648	80–64	L1
145	September 14	@ White Sox	0–4	McDowell (13–7)	**Hesketh** (0–3)		34,349	80–65	L2
146	September 15	@ White Sox	4–7	Hibbard (13–8)	**Harris** (13–7)	Thigpen (50)	41,197	80–66	L3
147	September 16	@ White Sox	2–4	King (10–4)	**Kiecker** (6–9)	Thigpen (51)	37,561	80–67	L4
148	September 17	@ Orioles	7–3	**Boddicker** (16–8)	McDonald (7–5)		22,826	80–68	W1
149	September 18	@ Orioles	1–4	Mesa (2–2)	**Bolton** (9–4)	Olson (32)	23,308	81–68	L1
150	September 19	@ Orioles	4–8	Telford (3–2)	**Harris** (13–8)	Schilling (3)	25,598	81–69	L2
151	September 21	@ Yankees	3–0	**Kiecker** (7–9)	Cary (5–11)	**Andersen** (1)	27,573	82–69	W1
152	September 22	@ Yankees	2–5	Plunk (6–3)	**Gray** (2–4)	Righetti (33)	37,795	82–70	L1
153	September 23	@ Yankees	4–5	Witt (5–8)	**Bolton** (9–5)	Righetti (34)	40,431	82–71	L2
154	September 25	Indians	2–5	Swindell (12–8)	**Harris** (13–9)	Jones (41)	28,670	82–72	L3
155	September 26	Indians	7–2	**Kiecker** (8–9)	Candiotti (14–11)		28,824	83–72	W1
156	September 27	@ Tigers	3–2	**Bolton** (10–5)	Searcy (2–7)	**Reardon** (19)	13,247	84–72	W2
157	September 28	Blue Jays	7–6	**Reardon** (4–3)	Henke (2–3)		35,735	85–72	W3
158	September 29	Blue Jays	7–5	**Clemens** (21–6)	Stottlemyre (13–17)	**Reardon** (20)	35,444	86–72	W4
159	September 30	Blue Jays	5–10	Key (13–7)	**Hesketh** (0–4)		34,400	86–73	L1

October (2–1) (Home: 2–1; Road: 0–0)

#	Date	Opponent	Score	Win	Loss	Save	Crowd	Record	Streak
160	October 1	White Sox	4–3	**Reardon** (5–3)	Jones (11–4)		31,118	87–73	W1
161	October 2	White Sox	2–3 (11)	Pall (3–5)	**Lamp** (3–5)	Edwards (2)	33,917	87–74	L1
162	October 3	White Sox	3–1	**Boddicker** (17–8)	Fernandez (5–5)	**Reardon** (21)	33,637	88–74	W1

== Player stats ==
=== Batting ===
Note: G = Games played; AB = At bats; R = Runs; H = Hits; 2B = Doubles; 3B = Triples; HR = Home runs; RBI = Runs batted in; SB = Stolen bases; BB = Walks; AVG = Batting average; SLG = Slugging average

Player	G	AB	R	H	2B	3B	HR	RBI	SB	BB	AVG	SLG
Wade Boggs	155	619	89	187	44	5	6	63	0	87	.302	.418
Mike Greenwell	159	610	71	181	30	6	14	73	8	65	.297	.434
Jody Reed	155	598	70	173	45	0	5	51	4	75	.289	.390
Ellis Burks	152	588	89	174	33	8	21	89	9	48	.296	.486
Carlos Quintana	149	512	56	147	28	0	7	67	1	52	.287	.383
Tony Peña	143	491	62	129	19	1	7	56	8	43	.263	.348
Tom Brunansky	129	461	61	123	24	5	15	71	5	54	.267	.438
Dwight Evans	123	445	66	111	18	3	13	63	3	67	.249	.391
Luis Rivera	118	346	38	78	20	0	7	45	4	25	.225	.344
Marty Barrett	62	159	15	36	4	0	0	13	4	15	.226	.252
Kevin Romine	70	136	21	37	7	0	2	14	4	12	.272	.368
Mike Marshall	30	112	10	32	6	1	4	12	0	4	.286	.464
Tim Naehring	24	85	10	23	6	0	2	12	0	8	.271	.412
John Marzano	32	83	8	20	4	0	0	6	0	5	.241	.289
Randy Kutcher	63	74	18	17	4	1	1	5	3	13	.230	.351
Danny Heep	41	69	3	12	1	1	0	8	0	7	.174	.217
Billy Jo Robidoux	27	44	3	8	4	0	1	4	0	6	.182	.341
Bill Buckner	22	43	4	8	0	0	1	3	0	3	.186	.256
Phil Plantier	14	15	1	2	1	0	0	3	0	4	.133	.200
Rich Gedman	10	15	3	3	0	0	0	0	0	5	.200	.200
Rick Lancellotti	4	8	0	0	0	0	0	1	0	0	.000	.000
Jeff Stone	10	2	1	1	0	0	0	1	0	0	.500	.500
Scott Cooper	2	1	0	0	0	0	0	0	0	0	.000	.000
Jim Pankovits	2	0	0	0	0	0	0	0	0	0	.---	.---
Team totals	162	5516	699	1502	298	31	106	660	53	598	.272	.395

=== Pitching ===
Note: W = Wins; L = Losses; ERA = Earned run average; G = Games pitched; GS = Games started; SV = Saves; IP = Innings pitched; H = Hits allowed; R = Runs allowed; ER = Earned runs allowed; BB = Walks allowed; SO = Strikeouts

Player	W	L	ERA	G	GS	SV	IP	H	R	ER	BB	SO
Roger Clemens	21	6	1.93	31	31	0	228.1	193	59	49	54	209
Mike Boddicker	17	8	3.36	34	34	0	228.0	225	92	85	69	143
Greg A. Harris	13	9	4.00	34	30	0	184.1	186	90	82	77	117
Dana Kiecker	8	9	3.97	32	25	0	152.0	145	74	67	54	93
Tom Bolton	10	5	3.38	21	16	0	119.2	111	46	45	47	65
Dennis Lamp	3	5	4.68	47	1	0	105.2	114	61	55	30	49
Wes Gardner	3	7	4.89	34	9	0	77.1	77	43	42	35	58
Rob Murphy	0	6	6.32	68	0	7	57.0	85	46	40	32	54
Jeff Reardon	5	3	3.16	47	0	21	51.1	39	19	18	19	33
Jeff Gray	2	4	4.44	41	0	9	50.2	53	27	25	15	50
Jerry Reed	2	1	4.80	29	0	2	45.0	55	27	24	16	17
Eric Hetzel	1	4	5.91	9	8	0	35.0	39	28	23	21	20
Joe Hesketh	0	4	3.51	12	2	0	25.2	37	12	10	11	26
Larry Andersen	0	0	1.23	15	0	1	22.0	18	3	3	3	25
John Dopson	0	0	2.04	4	4	0	17.2	13	7	4	9	9
Daryl Irvine	1	1	4.67	11	0	0	17.1	15	10	9	10	9
Lee Smith	2	1	1.88	11	0	4	14.1	13	4	3	9	17
John Leister	0	0	4.76	2	1	0	5.2	7	5	3	4	3
Mike Rochford	0	1	18.00	2	1	0	4.0	10	10	8	4	0
Danny Heep	0	0	9.00	1	0	0	1.0	4	1	1	0	0
Team totals	88	74	3.72	162	162	44	1442.0	1439	664	596	519	997

== Statistical leaders ==
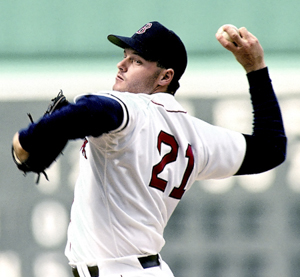
Roger Clemens

Category	Player	Statistic
Youngest player	Phil Plantier	21
Oldest player	Bill Buckner	40
Wins Above Replacement	Roger Clemens	10.4

=== Batting ===
Abbr.	Category	Player	Statistic
G	Games played	Mike Greenwell	159
PA	Plate appearances	Wade Boggs	713
AB	At bats	Wade Boggs	619
R	Runs scored	Wade Boggs	89
R	Runs scored	Ellis Burks	89
H	Hits	Wade Boggs	187
2B	Doubles	Jody Reed	45
3B	Triples	Ellis Burks	8
HR	Home runs	Ellis Burks	21
RBI	Runs batted in	Ellis Burks	89
SB	Stolen bases	Ellis Burks	9
CS	Caught stealing	Ellis Burks	11
BB	Base on balls	Wade Boggs	87
SO	Strikeouts	Tom Brunansky	105
BA	Batting average	Wade Boggs	.302
OBP	On-base percentage	Wade Boggs	.386
SLG	Slugging percentage	Ellis Burks	.486
OPS	On-base plus slugging	Ellis Burks	.835
OPS+	Adjusted OPS	Ellis Burks	128
TB	Total bases	Ellis Burks	286
GIDP	Grounded into double play	Tony Peña	23
HBP	Hit by pitch	3 tied	4
SH	Sacrifice hits	Luis Rivera	12
SF	Sacrifice flies	Tom Brunansky	8
IBB	Intentional base on balls	Wade Boggs	19

=== Pitching ===
Abbr.	Category	Player	Statistic
W	Wins	Roger Clemens	21
L	Losses	Greg A. Harris	9
L	Losses	Dana Kiecker	9
W-L %	Winning percentage	Roger Clemens	.778 (21–6)
ERA	Earned run average	Roger Clemens	1.93
G	Games pitched	Rob Murphy	68
GS	Games started	Mike Boddicker	34
GF	Games finished	Jeff Reardon	37
CG	Complete games	Roger Clemens	7
SHO	Shutouts	Roger Clemens	4
SV	Saves	Jeff Reardon	21
IP	Innings pitched	Roger Clemens	228 1/3
SO	Strikeouts	Roger Clemens	209
WHIP	Walks plus hits per inning pitched	Rogers Clemens	1.082

== ALCS ==
=== Game 1 ===
October 6, 1990, at Fenway Park

Team	1	2	3	4	5	6	7	8	9	R	H	E
Oakland	0	0	0	0	0	0	1	1	7	9	13	0
Boston	0	0	0	1	0	0	0	0	0	1	5	1
W: Dave Stewart (1–0) L: Larry Andersen (0–1)
HR: BOS – Wade Boggs (1)

=== Game 2 ===
October 7, 1990, at Fenway Park

Team	1	2	3	4	5	6	7	8	9	R	H	E
Oakland	0	0	0	1	0	0	1	0	2	4	13	1
Boston	0	0	1	0	0	0	0	0	0	1	6	0
W: Bob Welch (1–0) L: Greg Harris (0–1) S: Dennis Eckersley (1)
HR: None

=== Game 3 ===
October 9, 1990, at Oakland–Alameda County Coliseum

Team	1	2	3	4	5	6	7	8	9	R	H	E
Boston	0	1	0	0	0	0	0	0	0	1	8	3
Oakland	0	0	0	2	0	2	0	0	x	4	6	0
W: Mike Moore (1–0) L: Mike Boddicker (0–1) S: Dennis Eckersley (2)
HR: None

=== Game 4 ===
October 10, 1990, at Oakland–Alameda County Coliseum

Team	1	2	3	4	5	6	7	8	9	R	H	E
Boston	0	0	0	0	0	0	0	0	1	1	4	1
Oakland	0	3	0	0	0	0	0	0	x	3	6	0
W: Dave Stewart (2–0) L: Roger Clemens (0–1) S: Rick Honeycutt (1)
HR: None

== Awards and honors ==
Awards

- Mike Boddicker – Gold Glove Award (P)
- Ellis Burks – Silver Slugger Award (OF), Gold Glove Award (OF)
- Roger Clemens – AL Pitcher of the Month (August)

Accomplishments

- Roger Clemens, American League Leader, Shutouts (4)

All-Star Game

- Wade Boggs, third base, starter
- Ellis Burks, outfield, reserve
- Roger Clemens, pitcher, reserve

== Farm system ==
The Lynchburg Red Sox and Winter Haven Red Sox changed classification from Class A to Class A-Advanced.

Level	Team	League	Manager
AAA	Pawtucket Red Sox	International League	Ed Nottle and Johnny Pesky
AA	New Britain Red Sox	Eastern League	Butch Hobson
A-Advanced	Lynchburg Red Sox	Carolina League	Gary Allenson
A-Advanced	Winter Haven Red Sox	Florida State League	Dave Holt
A-Short Season	Elmira Pioneers	New York–Penn League	Mike Verdi
Rookie	GCL Red Sox	Gulf Coast League	Felix Maldonado
Rookie	DSL cooperative	Dominican Summer League	

The Red Sox shared a DSL team with the Detroit Tigers and San Diego Padres.
