= 1989 Boston Red Sox season =

Major League Baseball season

1989 Boston Red Sox
- League: American League
- Division: East
- Ballpark: Fenway Park
- City: Boston, Massachusetts
- Record: 83–79 (.512)
- Divisional place: 3rd
- Owners: Jean Yawkey, Haywood Sullivan
- President: John Harrington
- General manager: Lou Gorman
- Manager: Joe Morgan
- Television: WSBK-TV, Ch. 38 (Sean McDonough, Bob Montgomery); NESN (Ned Martin, Jerry Remy)
- Radio: WPLM-FM 99.1; WPLM-AM 1390 (Ken Coleman, Joe Castiglione); WRCA (Bobby Serrano, Hector Martinez)
- Stats: ESPN.com; Baseball Reference

The 1989 Boston Red Sox season was the 89th season in the franchise's Major League Baseball history. The Red Sox finished third in the American League East with a record of 83–79, six games behind the Toronto Blue Jays.

== Offseason ==
- November 20, 1988: Dennis Lamp was signed as a free agent by the Red Sox.
- December 8, 1988: Spike Owen was traded with Dan Gakeler to the Montreal Expos for John Dopson and Luis Rivera.
- February 6, 1989: Danny Heep signed as a free agent with the Red Sox.

== Regular season ==
Record by month
| Month | Record | | Cumulative | | AL East | | Ref. |
| Month | Won | Lost | Won | Lost | Position | GB | Ref. |
|---|---|---|---|---|---|---|---|
| April | 10 | 12 | 10 | 12 | 3rd (tie) | 1 | |
| May | 14 | 12 | 24 | 24 | 2nd | 2 | |
| June | 12 | 15 | 36 | 39 | 3rd | 6 1/2 | |
| July | 14 | 12 | 50 | 51 | 3rd | 3 | |
| August | 18 | 15 | 68 | 66 | 3rd | 4 | |
| September | 14 | 13 | 82 | 79 | 3rd | 7 | |
| October | 1 | 0 | 83 | 79 | 3rd | 6 | |

=== Highlights ===
Wade Boggs had 205 hits and 107 walks, becoming the first player in MLB history to have at least 200 hits and 100 walks in four consecutive seasons. He also became the first player in the modern era (after 1900) to have at least 200 hits in seven consecutive seasons.

=== Season standings ===
AL East
| Team | W | L | Pct. | GB | Home | Road |
|---|---|---|---|---|---|---|
| Toronto Blue Jays | 89 | 73 | .549 | — | 46‍–‍35 | 43‍–‍38 |
| Baltimore Orioles | 87 | 75 | .537 | 2 | 47‍–‍34 | 40‍–‍41 |
| Boston Red Sox | 83 | 79 | .512 | 6 | 46‍–‍35 | 37‍–‍44 |
| Milwaukee Brewers | 81 | 81 | .500 | 8 | 45‍–‍36 | 36‍–‍45 |
| New York Yankees | 74 | 87 | .460 | 14½ | 41‍–‍40 | 33‍–‍47 |
| Cleveland Indians | 73 | 89 | .451 | 16 | 41‍–‍40 | 32‍–‍49 |
| Detroit Tigers | 59 | 103 | .364 | 30 | 38‍–‍43 | 21‍–‍60 |

=== Record vs. opponents ===
1989 American League record Sources:
| Team | BAL | BOS | CAL | CWS | CLE | DET | KC | MIL | MIN | NYY | OAK | SEA | TEX | TOR |
|---|---|---|---|---|---|---|---|---|---|---|---|---|---|---|
| Baltimore | — | 6–7 | 6–6 | 6–6 | 7–6 | 10–3 | 6–6 | 7–6 | 4–8 | 8–5 | 5–7 | 6–6 | 9–3 | 7–6 |
| Boston | 7–6 | — | 4–8 | 7–5 | 8–5 | 11–2 | 4–8 | 6–7 | 6–6 | 7–6 | 7–5 | 5–7 | 6–6 | 5–8 |
| California | 6–6 | 8–4 | — | 8–5 | 5–7 | 11–1 | 4–9 | 7–5 | 11–2 | 6–6 | 5–8 | 7–6 | 6–7 | 7–5 |
| Chicago | 6–6 | 5–7 | 5–8 | — | 7–5 | 4–8 | 6–7 | 10–2 | 5–8 | 5–6 | 5–8 | 7–6 | 3–10 | 1–11 |
| Cleveland | 6–7 | 5–8 | 7–5 | 5–7 | — | 5–8 | 8–4 | 3–10 | 5–7 | 9–4 | 2–10 | 6–6 | 7–5 | 5–8 |
| Detroit | 3–10 | 2–11 | 1–11 | 8–4 | 8–5 | — | 6–6 | 6–7 | 5–7 | 6–7 | 4–8 | 4–8 | 4–8 | 2–11 |
| Kansas City | 6–6 | 8–4 | 9–4 | 7–6 | 4–8 | 6–6 | — | 8–4 | 7–6 | 6–6 | 7–6 | 9–4 | 8–5 | 7–5 |
| Milwaukee | 6–7 | 7–6 | 5–7 | 2–10 | 10–3 | 7–6 | 4–8 | — | 9–3 | 8–5 | 5–7 | 7–5 | 5–7 | 6–7 |
| Minnesota | 8–4 | 6–6 | 2–11 | 8–5 | 7–5 | 7–5 | 6–7 | 3–9 | — | 6–6 | 6–7 | 7–6 | 5–8 | 9–3 |
| New York | 5–8 | 6–7 | 6–6 | 6–5 | 4–9 | 7–6 | 6–6 | 5–8 | 6–6 | — | 3–9 | 8–4 | 5–7 | 7–6 |
| Oakland | 7–5 | 5–7 | 8–5 | 8–5 | 10–2 | 8–4 | 6–7 | 7–5 | 7–6 | 9–3 | — | 9–4 | 8–5 | 7–5 |
| Seattle | 6–6 | 7–5 | 6–7 | 6–7 | 6–6 | 8–4 | 4–9 | 5–7 | 6–7 | 4–8 | 4–9 | — | 6–7 | 5–7 |
| Texas | 3–9 | 6–6 | 7–6 | 10–3 | 5–7 | 8–4 | 5–8 | 7–5 | 8–5 | 7–5 | 5–8 | 7–6 | — | 5–7 |
| Toronto | 6–7 | 8–5 | 5–7 | 11–1 | 8–5 | 11–2 | 5–7 | 7–6 | 3–9 | 6–7 | 5–7 | 7–5 | 7–5 | — |

=== Notable transactions ===
- August 5, 1989: Ed Romero was released by the Red Sox.
- August 7, 1989: Greg A. Harris was selected off waivers by the Red Sox from the Philadelphia Phillies.

=== Other Transactions ===
- September 25: Pitcher Bob Stanley announces his retirement; the Red Sox inform Jim Rice that he will not be invited back to the team next year.

=== Opening Day lineup ===
| 26 | Wade Boggs | 3B |
| 17 | Marty Barrett | 2B |
| 24 | Dwight Evans | RF |
| 39 | Mike Greenwell | LF |
| 12 | Ellis Burks | CF |
| 14 | Jim Rice | DH |
| 7 | Nick Esasky | 1B |
| 10 | Rich Gedman | C |
| 3 | Jody Reed | SS |
| 21 | Roger Clemens | P |

The Red Sox lost their Opening Day game, 5–4 in 11 innings, to the Baltimore Orioles at Memorial Stadium in Baltimore. The ceremonial first pitch was thrown by President George H. W. Bush.

=== Alumni game ===
The team held an old-timers game on May 6, before a scheduled home game against the Texas Rangers. Festivities included an appearance by Carl Yastrzemski, shortly after his election to the Hall of Fame. Red Sox alumni lost to a team of former MLB players from other clubs, by a 9–0 score in three innings of play.

=== Roster ===
1989 Boston Red Sox
Roster
| Pitchers: 52 Mike Boddicker; 50 Tom Bolton; 23 Oil Can Boyd; 21 Roger Clemens; 40 John Dopson; 44 Wes Gardner; 27,42 Greg Harris; 31 Eric Hetzel; 15 Dennis Lamp; 47 Rob Murphy; 49 Joe Price; 54 Mike Rochford; 48 Lee Smith; 41 Mike Smithson; 46 Bob Stanley | Catchers: 6 Rick Cerone; 10 Rich Gedman; 20 John Marzano; Infielders: 17 Marty Barrett; 26 Wade Boggs; 7 Nick Esasky; 30 Sam Horn; 3 Jody Reed; 2 Luis Rivera; 11 Ed Romero | Outfielders: 12 Ellis Burks; 24 Dwight Evans; 39 Mike Greenwell; 29 Danny Heep; 5 Randy Kutcher; 18 Carlos Quintana; 16 Kevin Romine; 19 Jeff Stone; 19,20 Dana Williams; Other batters: 14 Jim Rice | Manager: 35 Joe Morgan; Coaches: 33 Dick Berardino (Bullpen); 37 Al Bumbry (First base); 34 Bill Fischer (Pitching); 32 Richie Hebner (Hitting); 36 Rac Slider (Third base) |

== Player stats ==
=== Batting ===
Note: G = Games played; AB = At bats; R = Runs; H = Hits; 2B = Doubles; 3B = Triples; HR = Home runs; RBI = Runs batted in; SB = Stolen bases; BB = Walks; AVG = Batting average; SLG = Slugging average

| Player | G | AB | R | H | 2B | 3B | HR | RBI | SB | BB | AVG | SLG |
|---|---|---|---|---|---|---|---|---|---|---|---|---|
| Wade Boggs | 156 | 621 | 113 | 205 | 51 | 7 | 3 | 54 | 2 | 107 | .330 | .449 |
| Mike Greenwell | 145 | 578 | 87 | 178 | 36 | 0 | 14 | 95 | 13 | 56 | .308 | .443 |
| Nick Esasky | 154 | 564 | 79 | 156 | 26 | 5 | 30 | 108 | 1 | 66 | .277 | .500 |
| Jody Reed | 146 | 524 | 76 | 151 | 42 | 2 | 3 | 40 | 4 | 73 | .288 | .393 |
| Dwight Evans | 146 | 520 | 82 | 148 | 27 | 3 | 20 | 100 | 3 | 99 | .285 | .463 |
| Ellis Burks | 97 | 399 | 73 | 121 | 19 | 6 | 12 | 61 | 21 | 36 | .303 | .471 |
| Marty Barrett | 86 | 336 | 31 | 86 | 18 | 0 | 1 | 27 | 4 | 32 | .256 | .318 |
| Luis Rivera | 93 | 323 | 35 | 83 | 17 | 1 | 5 | 29 | 2 | 20 | .257 | .362 |
| Danny Heep | 113 | 320 | 36 | 96 | 17 | 0 | 5 | 49 | 0 | 29 | .300 | .400 |
| Rick Cerone | 102 | 296 | 28 | 72 | 16 | 1 | 4 | 48 | 0 | 34 | .243 | .345 |
| Kevin Romine | 92 | 274 | 30 | 75 | 13 | 0 | 1 | 23 | 1 | 21 | .274 | .332 |
| Rich Gedman | 93 | 260 | 24 | 55 | 9 | 0 | 4 | 16 | 0 | 23 | .212 | .292 |
| Jim Rice | 56 | 209 | 22 | 49 | 10 | 2 | 3 | 28 | 1 | 13 | .234 | .344 |
| Randy Kutcher | 77 | 160 | 28 | 36 | 10 | 3 | 2 | 18 | 3 | 11 | .225 | .363 |
| Ed Romero | 46 | 113 | 14 | 24 | 4 | 0 | 0 | 6 | 0 | 7 | .212 | .248 |
| Carlos Quintana | 34 | 77 | 6 | 16 | 5 | 0 | 0 | 6 | 0 | 7 | .208 | .273 |
| Sam Horn | 33 | 54 | 1 | 8 | 2 | 0 | 0 | 4 | 0 | 8 | .148 | .185 |
| John Marzano | 7 | 18 | 5 | 8 | 3 | 0 | 1 | 3 | 0 | 0 | .444 | .778 |
| Jeff Stone | 18 | 15 | 3 | 3 | 0 | 0 | 0 | 1 | 1 | 1 | .200 | .200 |
| Dana Williams | 8 | 5 | 1 | 1 | 1 | 0 | 0 | 0 | 0 | 0 | .200 | .400 |
| Team totals | 162 | 5666 | 774 | 1571 | 326 | 30 | 108 | 716 | 56 | 643 | .277 | .403 |

=== Pitching ===
Note: W = Wins; L = Losses; ERA = Earned run average; G = Games pitched; GS = Games started; SV = Saves; IP = Innings pitched; H = Hits allowed; R = Runs allowed; ER = Earned runs allowed; BB = Walks allowed; SO = Strikeouts

| Player | W | L | ERA | G | GS | SV | IP | H | R | ER | BB | SO |
|---|---|---|---|---|---|---|---|---|---|---|---|---|
| Roger Clemens | 17 | 11 | 3.13 | 35 | 35 | 0 | 253.1 | 215 | 101 | 88 | 93 | 230 |
| Mike Boddicker | 15 | 11 | 4.00 | 34 | 34 | 0 | 211.2 | 217 | 101 | 94 | 71 | 145 |
| John Dopson | 12 | 8 | 3.99 | 29 | 28 | 0 | 169.1 | 166 | 84 | 75 | 69 | 95 |
| Mike Smithson | 7 | 14 | 4.95 | 40 | 19 | 2 | 143.2 | 170 | 84 | 79 | 35 | 61 |
| Dennis Lamp | 4 | 2 | 2.32 | 42 | 0 | 2 | 112.1 | 96 | 37 | 29 | 27 | 61 |
| Rob Murphy | 5 | 7 | 2.74 | 74 | 0 | 9 | 105.0 | 97 | 38 | 32 | 41 | 107 |
| Wes Gardner | 3 | 7 | 5.97 | 22 | 16 | 0 | 86.0 | 97 | 64 | 57 | 47 | 81 |
| Bob Stanley | 5 | 2 | 4.88 | 43 | 0 | 4 | 79.1 | 102 | 54 | 43 | 26 | 32 |
| Lee Smith | 6 | 1 | 3.57 | 64 | 0 | 25 | 70.2 | 53 | 30 | 28 | 33 | 96 |
| Joe Price | 2 | 5 | 4.35 | 31 | 5 | 0 | 70.1 | 71 | 35 | 34 | 30 | 52 |
| Oil Can Boyd | 3 | 2 | 4.42 | 10 | 10 | 0 | 59.0 | 57 | 31 | 29 | 19 | 26 |
| Eric Hetzel | 2 | 3 | 6.26 | 12 | 11 | 0 | 50.1 | 61 | 39 | 35 | 28 | 33 |
| Greg A. Harris | 2 | 2 | 2.57 | 15 | 0 | 0 | 28.0 | 21 | 12 | 8 | 15 | 25 |
| Tom Bolton | 0 | 4 | 8.31 | 4 | 4 | 0 | 17.1 | 21 | 18 | 16 | 10 | 9 |
| Mike Rochford | 0 | 0 | 6.75 | 4 | 0 | 0 | 4.0 | 4 | 7 | 3 | 4 | 1 |
| Team totals | 83 | 79 | 4.01 | 162 | 162 | 42 | 1460.1 | 1448 | 735 | 650 | 548 | 1054 |

== Statistical leaders ==
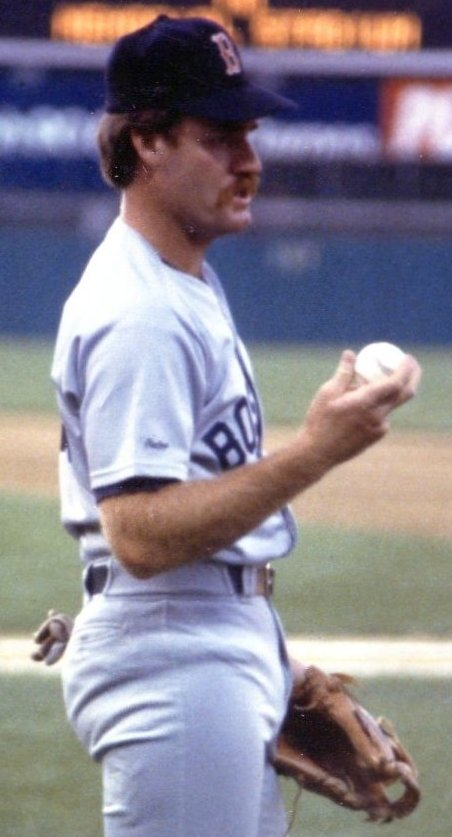
Wade Boggs

| Category | Player | Statistic |
|---|---|---|
| Youngest player | Carlos Quintana | 23 |
| Oldest player | Dwight Evans | 37 |
| Wins Above Replacement | Wade Boggs | 8.4 |

=== Batting ===
| Abbr. | Category | Player | Statistic |
|---|---|---|---|
| G | Games played | Wade Boggs | 156 |
| PA | Plate appearances | Wade Boggs | 742 |
| AB | At bats | Wade Boggs | 621 |
| R | Runs scored | Wade Boggs | 113 |
| H | Hits | Wade Boggs | 205 |
| 2B | Doubles | Wade Boggs | 51 |
| 3B | Triples | Wade Boggs | 7 |
| HR | Home runs | Nick Esasky | 30 |
| RBI | Runs batted in | Nick Esasky | 108 |
| SB | Stolen bases | Ellis Burks | 21 |
| CS | Caught stealing | Wade Boggs | 6 |
| BB | Base on balls | Wade Boggs | 107 |
| SO | Strikeouts | Nick Esasky | 117 |
| BA | Batting average | Wade Boggs | .330 |
| OBP | On-base percentage | Wade Boggs | .430 |
| SLG | Slugging percentage | Nick Esasky | .500 |
| OPS | On-base plus slugging | Wade Boggs | .879 |
| OPS+ | Adjusted OPS | Wade Boggs | 142 |
| TB | Total bases | Nick Esasky | 282 |
| GIDP | Grounded into double play | Mike Greenwell | 21 |
| HBP | Hit by pitch | Wade Boggs | 7 |
| SH | Sacrifice hits | Marty Barrett | 15 |
| SF | Sacrifice flies | Wade Boggs | 7 |
| SF | Sacrifice flies | Dwight Evans | 7 |
| IBB | Intentional base on balls | Wade Boggs | 19 |

=== Pitching ===
| Abbr. | Category | Player | Statistic |
|---|---|---|---|
| W | Wins | Roger Clemens | 17 |
| L | Losses | Mike Smithson | 14 |
| W-L % | Winning percentage | Roger Clemens | .607 (17–11) |
| ERA | Earned run average | Roger Clemens | 3.13 |
| G | Games pitched | Rob Murphy | 74 |
| GS | Games started | Roger Clemens | 35 |
| GF | Games finished | Lee Smith | 50 |
| CG | Complete games | Roger Clemens | 8 |
| SHO | Shutouts | Roger Clemens | 3 |
| SV | Saves | Lee Smith | 25 |
| IP | Innings pitched | Roger Clemens | 253 1/3 |
| SO | Strikeouts | Roger Clemens | 230 |
| WHIP | Walks plus hits per inning pitched | Roger Clemens | 1.216 |

== Awards and honors ==
Awards

- Wade Boggs, Silver Slugger Award (3B)
- Nick Esasky, AL Player of the Month (August)

Accomplishments

- Wade Boggs, American League Leader, Runs (113)
- Wade Boggs, American League Leader, Doubles (51)

All-Star Game

- Wade Boggs, third base, starter
- Mike Greenwell, outfield, reserve
- Joe Morgan, manager, bench coach

== Farm system ==
The Gulf Coast League Red Sox replaced the Arizona League Red Sox/Mariners (a cooperative team) as the domestic Rookie League affiliate.

| Level | Team | League | Manager |
|---|---|---|---|
| AAA | Pawtucket Red Sox | International League | Ed Nottle |
| AA | New Britain Red Sox | Eastern League | Butch Hobson |
| A | Lynchburg Red Sox | Carolina League | Gary Allenson |
| A | Winter Haven Red Sox | Florida State League | Dave Holt |
| A-Short Season | Elmira Pioneers | New York–Penn League | Mike Verdi |
| Rookie | GCL Red Sox | Gulf Coast League | Felix Maldonado |
| Rookie | DSL cooperative | Dominican Summer League | |

The Red Sox shared a DSL team with the Baltimore Orioles and Milwaukee Brewers.
