= 1991 Boston Red Sox season =

Major League Baseball season

1991 Boston Red Sox
- League: American League
- Division: East
- Ballpark: Fenway Park
- City: Boston
- Record: 84–78 (.519)
- Divisional place: 2nd
- Owners: Jean Yawkey, Haywood Sullivan
- President: John Harrington
- General manager: Lou Gorman
- Manager: Joe Morgan
- Television: WSBK-TV, Ch. 38 (Sean McDonough, Bob Montgomery); NESN (Ned Martin, Jerry Remy)
- Radio: WRKO (Bob Starr, Joe Castiglione); WROL (Bobby Serrano, Hector Martinez)
- Stats: ESPN.com; Baseball Reference

The 1991 Boston Red Sox season was the 91st season in the franchise's Major League Baseball history. The Red Sox finished tied for second in the American League East with a record of 84 wins and 78 losses, seven games behind the Toronto Blue Jays.

== Offseason ==
- December 19, 1990: Danny Darwin signed as a free agent with the Red Sox.
- February 1, 1991: John Moses was signed as a free agent by the Red Sox.
- April 1, 1991: John Moses was released by the Red Sox.

== Regular season ==
Record by month
Month	Record		Cumulative		AL East		Ref.
Month	Won	Lost	Won	Lost	Position	GB	Ref.
April	11	7	11	7	1st	+1/2	
May	15	13	26	20	1st	—	
June	11	16	37	36	2nd	4 1/2	
July	11	16	48	52	3rd	9	
August	18	11	66	63	3rd	6	
September	17	10	83	73	2nd	3 1/2	
October	1	5	84	78	2nd (tie)	7	

=== Season standings ===
AL East
Team	W	L	Pct.	GB	Home	Road
Toronto Blue Jays	91	71	.562	—	46‍–‍35	45‍–‍36
Boston Red Sox	84	78	.519	7	43‍–‍38	41‍–‍40
Detroit Tigers	84	78	.519	7	49‍–‍32	35‍–‍46
Milwaukee Brewers	83	79	.512	8	43‍–‍37	40‍–‍42
New York Yankees	71	91	.438	20	39‍–‍42	32‍–‍49
Baltimore Orioles	67	95	.414	24	33‍–‍48	34‍–‍47
Cleveland Indians	57	105	.352	34	30‍–‍52	27‍–‍53

=== Record vs. opponents ===
1991 American League record Sources:
Team	BAL	BOS	CAL	CWS	CLE	DET	KC	MIL	MIN	NYY	OAK	SEA	TEX	TOR
Baltimore	—	8–5	6–6	4–8	7–6	5–8	4–8	3–10	4–8	5–8	3–9	4–8	9–3	5–8
Boston	5–8	—	4–8	7–5	9–4	5–8	7–5	7–6	3–9	6–7	8–4	9–3	5–7	9–4
California	6–6	8–4	—	8–5	7–5	5–7	9–4	6–6	8–5	6–6	1–12	6–7	5–8	6–6
Chicago	8–4	5–7	5–8	—	6–6	4–8	7–6	7–5	8–5	8–4	7–6	7–6	8–5	7–5
Cleveland	6–7	4–9	5–7	6–6	—	7–6	4–8	5–8	2–10	6–7	5–7	2–10	4–8	1–12
Detroit	8–5	8–5	7–5	8–4	6–7	—	8–4	4–9	4–8	8–5	4–8	8–4	6–6	5–8
Kansas City	8–4	5–7	4–9	6–7	8–4	4–8	—	9–3	6–7	7–5	6–7	7–6	7–6	5–7
Milwaukee	10–3	6–7	6–6	5–7	8–5	9–4	3–9	—	6–6	6–7	8–4	3–9	7–5	6–7
Minnesota	8–4	9–3	5–8	5–8	10–2	8–4	7–6	6–6	—	10–2	8–5	9–4	6–7	4–8
New York	8–5	7–6	6–6	4–8	7–6	5–8	5–7	7–6	2–10	—	6–6	3–9	5–7	6–7
Oakland	9–3	4–8	12–1	6–7	7–5	8–4	7–6	4–8	5–8	6–6	—	6–7	4–9	6–6
Seattle	8–4	3–9	7–6	6–7	10–2	4–8	6–7	9–3	4–9	9–3	7–6	—	5–8	5–7
Texas	3–9	7–5	8–5	5–8	8–4	6–6	6–7	5–7	7–6	7–5	9–4	8–5	—	6–6
Toronto	8–5	4–9	6–6	5–7	12–1	8–5	7–5	7–6	8–4	7–6	6–6	7–5	6–6	—

=== Notable transactions ===
- April 18, 1991: Steve Lyons was signed as a free agent by the Red Sox.
- August 9, 1991: Kevin Romine was released by the Red Sox.

=== Opening Day Line Up ===
26	Wade Boggs	3B
3	Jody Reed	2B
39	Mike Greenwell	LF
25	Jack Clark	DH
12	Ellis Burks	CF
23	Tom Brunansky	RF
18	Carlos Quintana	1B
6	Tony Peña	C
11	Tim Naehring	SS
21	Roger Clemens	P

=== Alumni game ===
The team held an old-timers game on May 11, before a scheduled home game against the Texas Rangers. Festivities included non-playing appearances by Ted Williams (then 72) and Joe DiMaggio (then 76), in recognition of the 50th anniversary of the 1941 MLB season, when Williams batted .406 and DiMaggio had a 56-game hitting streak.

Red Sox alumni lost, 9–5, to a team of MLB alumni from other clubs, led by José Cardenal who had three hits (including two doubles) in the three-inning game.

=== Roster ===
1991 Boston Red Sox
Roster
Pitchers: 50 Tom Bolton; 21 Roger Clemens; 44 Danny Darwin; 40 John Dopson; 48 Tony Fossas; 47 Mike Gardiner; 38 Jeff Gray; 27 Greg Harris; 55 Joe Hesketh; 59 Daryl Irvine; 19 Dana Kiecker; 15 Dennis Lamp; 51 Josías Manzanillo; 43 Kevin Morton; 46 Dan Petry; 54 Jeff Plympton; 41 Jeff Reardon; 30 Matt Young	Catchers: 20 John Marzano; 6 Tony Peña; Infielders: 26 Wade Boggs; 10 Mike Brumley; 45 Scott Cooper; 22 Mike Marshall; 11 Tim Naehring; 18 Carlos Quintana; 3 Jody Reed; 2 Luis Rivera; 42 Mo Vaughn	Outfielders: 23 Tom Brunansky; 12 Ellis Burks; 39 Mike Greenwell; 17 Wayne Housie; 7 Steve Lyons; 29 Phil Plantier; 16 Kevin Romine; 16 Bob Zupcic; Other batters: 25 Jack Clark; 22 Eric Wedge	Manager: 35 Joe Morgan; Coaches: 33 Dick Berardino (third base); 37 Al Bumbry (first base); 34 Bill Fischer (pitching); 32 Richie Hebner (hitting); 36 John McLaren (bullpen)

== Player stats ==
=== Batting ===
Note: G = Games played; AB = At bats; R = Runs; H = Hits; 2B = Doubles; 3B = Triples; HR = Home runs; RBI = Runs batted in; SB = Stolen bases; BB = Walks; AVG = Batting average; SLG = Slugging average

Player	G	AB	R	H	2B	3B	HR	RBI	SB	BB	AVG	SLG
Jody Reed	153	618	87	175	42	2	5	60	6	60	.283	.382
Wade Boggs	144	546	93	181	42	2	8	51	1	89	.332	.460
Mike Greenwell	147	541	76	163	26	6	9	83	15	43	.300	.419
Jack Clark	140	481	75	120	18	1	28	87	0	96	.249	.466
Carlos Quintana	149	478	69	141	21	1	11	71	1	61	.295	.412
Ellis Burks	130	474	56	119	33	3	14	56	6	39	.251	.422
Tony Peña	141	464	45	107	23	2	5	48	8	37	.231	.321
Tom Brunansky	142	459	54	105	24	1	16	70	1	49	.229	.390
Luis Rivera	129	414	64	107	22	3	8	40	4	35	.258	.384
Mo Vaughn	74	219	21	57	12	0	4	32	2	26	.260	.370
Steve Lyons	87	212	15	51	10	1	4	17	10	11	.241	.354
Phil Plantier	53	148	27	49	7	1	11	35	1	23	.331	.615
Mike Brumley	63	118	16	25	5	0	0	5	2	10	.212	.254
John Marzano	49	114	10	30	8	0	0	9	0	1	.263	.333
Mike Marshall	22	62	4	18	4	0	1	7	0	0	.290	.403
Tim Naehring	20	55	1	6	1	0	0	3	0	6	.109	.127
Kevin Romine	44	55	7	9	2	0	1	7	1	3	.164	.255
Scott Cooper	14	35	6	16	4	2	0	7	0	2	.457	.686
Bob Zupcic	18	25	3	4	0	0	1	3	0	1	.160	.280
Wayne Housie	11	8	2	2	1	0	0	0	1	1	.250	.375
Eric Wedge	1	1	0	1	0	0	0	0	0	0	1.000	1.000
Team totals	162	5530	731	1486	305	25	126	691	59	593	.269	.401

=== Pitching ===
Note: W = Wins; L = Losses; ERA = Earned run average; G = Games pitched; GS = Games started; SV = Saves; IP = Innings pitched; H = Hits allowed; R = Runs allowed; ER = Earned runs allowed; BB = Walks allowed; SO = Strikeouts

Player	W	L	ERA	G	GS	SV	IP	H	R	ER	BB	SO
Roger Clemens	18	10	2.62	35	35	0	271.1	219	93	79	65	241
Greg A. Harris	11	12	3.85	53	21	2	173.0	157	79	74	69	127
Joe Hesketh	12	4	3.29	39	17	0	153.1	142	59	56	53	104
Mike Gardiner	9	10	4.85	22	22	0	130.0	140	79	70	47	91
Tom Bolton	8	9	5.24	25	19	0	110.0	136	72	64	51	64
Dennis Lamp	6	3	4.70	51	0	0	92.0	100	54	48	31	57
Matt Young	3	7	5.18	19	16	0	88.2	92	55	51	53	69
Kevin Morton	6	5	4.59	16	15	0	86.1	93	49	44	40	45
Danny Darwin	3	6	5.16	12	12	0	68.0	71	39	39	15	42
Jeff Gray	2	3	2.34	50	0	1	61.2	39	17	16	10	41
Jeff Reardon	1	4	3.03	57	0	40	59.1	54	21	20	16	44
Tony Fossas	3	2	3.47	64	0	1	57.0	49	27	22	28	29
Dana Kiecker	2	3	7.36	18	5	0	40.1	56	34	33	23	21
Dan Petry	0	0	4.43	13	0	1	22.1	21	17	11	12	12
Daryl Irvine	0	0	6.00	9	0	0	18.0	25	13	12	9	8
Jeff Plympton	0	0	0.00	4	0	0	5.1	5	0	0	4	2
Steve Lyons	0	0	0.00	1	0	0	1.0	2	0	0	0	1
John Dopson	0	0	18.00	1	0	0	1.0	2	2	2	1	0
Josías Manzanillo	0	0	18.00	1	0	0	1.0	2	2	2	3	1
Team totals	84	78	4.01	162	162	45	1439.2	1405	712	642	530	999

== Statistical leaders ==
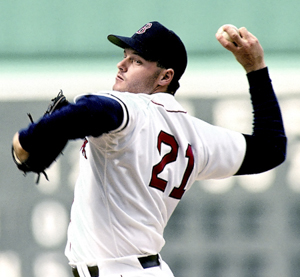
Roger Clemens

Category	Player	Statistic
Youngest player	Kevin Morton	22
Youngest player	Phil Plantier	22
Oldest player	Dennis Lamp	38
Wins Above Replacement	Roger Clemens	7.9

=== Batting ===
Abbr.	Category	Player	Statistic
G	Games played	Jody Reed	153
PA	Plate appearances	Jody Reed	696
AB	At bats	Jody Reed	618
R	Runs scored	Wade Boggs	93
H	Hits	Wade Boggs	181
2B	Doubles	Wade Boggs	42
2B	Doubles	Jody Reed	42
3B	Triples	Mike Greenwell	6
HR	Home runs	Jack Clark	28
RBI	Runs batted in	Jack Clark	87
SB	Stolen bases	Mike Greenwell	15
CS	Caught stealing	Ellis Burks	11
BB	Base on balls	Jack Clark	96
SO	Strikeouts	Jack Clark	133
BA	Batting average	Wade Boggs	.332
OBP	On-base percentage	Wade Boggs	.421
SLG	Slugging percentage	Jack Clark	.466
OPS	On-base plus slugging	Wade Boggs	.881
OPS+	Adjusted OPS	Wade Boggs	140
TB	Total bases	Wade Boggs	251
GIDP	Grounded into double play	Tony Peña	23
HBP	Hit by pitch	Ellis Burks	6
SH	Sacrifice hits	Luis Rivera	12
SF	Sacrifice flies	Tom Brunansky	8
IBB	Intentional base on balls	Wade Boggs	25

=== Pitching ===
Abbr.	Category	Player	Statistic
W	Wins	Roger Clemens	18
L	Losses	Greg A. Harris	12
W-L %	Winning percentage	Joe Hesketh	.750 (12–4)
ERA	Earned run average	Roger Clemens	2.62
G	Games pitched	Tony Fossas	64
GS	Games started	Roger Clemens	35
GF	Games finished	Jeff Reardon	51
CG	Complete games	Roger Clemens	13
SHO	Shutouts	Roger Clemens	4
SV	Saves	Jeff Reardon	40
IP	Innings pitched	Roger Clemens	271 1/3
SO	Strikeouts	Roger Clemens	241
WHIP	Walks plus hits per inning pitched	Roger Clemens	1.047

== Awards and honors ==
Awards

- Wade Boggs – Silver Slugger Award (3B)
- Roger Clemens – American League Cy Young Award, AL Pitcher of the Month (April, September)
- Tony Peña – Gold Glove Award (C)

Accomplishments

- Roger Clemens, American League Leader, Games Started (35)
- Roger Clemens, American League Leader, Innings Pitched (271 1/3)
- Roger Clemens, American League Leader, Shutouts (4)

All-Star Game

- Wade Boggs, third base, starter
- Roger Clemens, pitcher, reserve
- Jeff Reardon, relief pitcher, reserve

== Farm system ==
Level	Team	League	Manager
AAA	Pawtucket Red Sox	International League	Butch Hobson
AA	New Britain Red Sox	Eastern League	Gary Allenson
A-Advanced	Lynchburg Red Sox	Carolina League	Buddy Bailey
A-Advanced	Winter Haven Red Sox	Florida State League	Mike Verdi
A-Short Season	Elmira Pioneers	New York–Penn League	Dave Holt
Rookie	GCL Red Sox	Gulf Coast League	Felix Maldonado
