= Lou Gorman =

American executive in Major League Baseball

- General Manager
- Born: February 18, 1929; Providence, Rhode Island, U.S.
- Died: April 1, 2011 (aged 82); Boston, Massachusetts, U.S.
- Stats at Baseball Reference

Teams
- Seattle Mariners (1977–1980); Boston Red Sox (1984–1993)

Career highlights and awards
- Boston Red Sox Hall of Fame

James Gerald "Lou" Gorman (February 18, 1929 – April 1, 2011) was an American baseball executive, and the former general manager of the Seattle Mariners and Boston Red Sox of Major League Baseball. He spent more than three decades in baseball operations, as a general manager, assistant GM, farm system director or scouting director, and at the time of his death he was the Red Sox' executive consultant for public affairs with an emphasis on community projects. He also was the coordinator of the Boston Red Sox Hall of Fame, to which he was inducted in 2002.

== Early years ==
A native of South Providence, Rhode Island, Gorman grew up a Red Sox fan. At the high school level, at La Salle Academy in Providence, he was an excellent athlete—he was nicknamed after Lou Gehrig—but was cut from the minors. His Baseball Reference player page records that a 19-year-old Gorman played in 16 games for the 1948 Providence Grays of the Class B New England League, compiling a batting average of .036 (1-for-28).

After his professional playing career stalled, Gorman enrolled in Stonehill College for his bachelor's degree. He then served in the United States Navy, including more than eight years of active duty and two tours in Korea. Gorman's naval career, including his tenure with the United States Navy Reserve, lasted for 34 years. He retired with the rank of captain. After his active service, he entered Bridgewater State College for his master's in education, which he received in 1961.

== Baseball front office career ==
Gorman resumed his baseball career in 1962 as an executive in the minor leagues when he became general manager with the Class D Lakeland Giants in the San Francisco Giants' system, then, in 1963 with the Single-A Kinston Eagles in the Pittsburgh Pirates' chain.

Gorman joined the Baltimore Orioles' Major League front office in 1964 as assistant farm system director, working under Harry Dalton. He was promoted to director of player development in 1966, when the Orioles won their first World Series championship. In 1968, Gorman became the first farm system director in the history of the Kansas City Royals, where he eventually also assumed control of the team's scouting department. For his efforts, he was promoted to vice president in 1973 and assistant general manager in 1976.

But he soon departed for a new expansion team when he was appointed director of baseball operations (in effect, chief baseball officer) of the Seattle Mariners when they entered the American League in 1977; he later was formally appointed the club's general manager. Although the under-capitalized Mariners struggled during Gorman's four seasons in Seattle—they posted a 246–400 (.381) record from 1977–1980 with two last-place finishes in the AL West—he obtained early Mariner standout Ruppert Jones in the 1976 Major League Baseball expansion draft (from his old Royals' organization) and drafted centerfielder Dave Henderson with his first-ever No. 1 choice in the June 1977 Major League Baseball draft.

After building the Seattle organization from scratch, he returned to the East Coast as vice president, player personnel, of the New York Mets in 1980. Working under Mets' GM Frank Cashen, with whom Gorman served with the Orioles, he helped lay the foundation for the Mets' 1986 World Series championship—achieved at the expense of his next team, the Red Sox.

=== Red Sox general manager ===
In the months preceding the 1984 season, the Red Sox were embroiled in a legal dispute involving two ownership factions seeking control of the team. Gorman was named vice president of baseball operations in the Boston front office on February 2, 1984; then, four months later, when the legal case was settled, he was officially appointed vice president and general manager, succeeding co-owner Haywood Sullivan, who moved up to chief executive officer. When Gorman took on the general manager job June 6, the Red Sox already had players like Roger Clemens, Wade Boggs, Dwight Evans and Bob Stanley, stars that would form the nucleus of the talented Red Sox teams of the late 1980s. However, it was Gorman's acquisitions (from the Mariners) of Dave Henderson and Spike Owen and closer Calvin Schiraldi (from the Mets) that helped lead the Red Sox to the 1986 World Series. In the spring of 1987, unhappy about his contract, Roger Clemens left spring training, which prompted Gorman to quip, "The sun will rise, the sun will set, and I'll have lunch."

Though the team made it back to the playoffs in 1988 and 1990, it never got any closer to a championship than it had in 1986. Gorman made several key trades, such as picking up Nick Esasky and Rob Murphy from Cincinnati and getting closer Lee Smith for World Series goat Schiraldi and pitcher Al Nipper, but he made mistakes as well. It was Gorman who traded away future All-Stars Jeff Bagwell, Curt Schilling, and Brady Anderson in pennant-stretch deals. The Boston farm system, which had produced players such as Mike Greenwell, Ellis Burks, Jody Reed and Todd Benzinger early in Gorman's tenure, developed everyday players such as Mo Vaughn, John Valentin, Aaron Sele, Tim Naehring, Carlos Quintana and Scott Hatteberg in the early 1990s, but the flow of talent was not enough to keep the club at the forefront of its division. The Red Sox were unable to retain free agents Bruce Hurst, Esasky and Mike Boddicker (a front-line starting pitcher acquired for Schilling and Brady Anderson in 1988), and when the team returned to the free agent marketplace after the 1989 season, catcher Tony Peña and pitchers Jeff Reardon and Danny Darwin approached expectations, while high-profile signings Jack Clark, Frank Viola and Matt Young were major disappointments.

The Red Sox won another AL East title in 1990, but it was the trade involving Bagwell, at the time a third base prospect in the minor leagues, that would ultimately come back to haunt the team the most. Looking to strengthen the bullpen, Gorman traded him to the Houston Astros for relief pitcher Larry Andersen. Andersen pitched just 15 games for the Red Sox before being declared a free agent as a result of the second collusion settlement, while Bagwell would spend his entire 15-year career with the Astros, evolving into one of the most productive and consistent power hitters in major league history. Thus, the trade is now reckoned as one of the most lopsided deals in baseball history, especially as Bagwell was inducted into the Baseball Hall of Fame. Some analysts are less critical of Gorman making a deal to acquire Andersen, and more critical of Gorman selecting Bagwell as the third base prospect to send to Houston rather than Scott Cooper.

After 1990, the Red Sox faded from contention. They finished a distant second in 1991, and in 1992 collapsed all the way to last place for the first time in 60 years. After another losing campaign in 1993, wholesale changes were made in the Red Sox front office. Gorman was relieved of his general manager responsibilities on November 10, becoming senior vice president of baseball operations. Two weeks later, John Harrington, who as executive director of the JRY Trust was the team's managing general partner, bought out minority general partner Sullivan to assume full control. Harrington then hired Montreal Expos general manager Dan Duquette (another native New Englander) as Gorman's permanent successor in February 1994.

In his nine full seasons as general manager, 1985 through 1993, the Red Sox compiled a 751–706 (.515) win–loss record, with three division titles and one American League pennant.

== Late career ==
Gorman was a senior vice president, then executive vice president, in the Red Sox' baseball operations department through 1996. He also served as a member of the advisory board of the Baseball Assistance Team, a 501(c)(3) non-profit organization dedicated to helping former Major League, Minor League, and Negro league players through financial and medical difficulties. In his later years, Gorman was the chairman of the board of the Newport Gulls of the New England Collegiate Baseball League, and was instrumental to the team.

After a period of declining health, Gorman died at Massachusetts General Hospital, Boston, at age 82 on the Opening Day of the Red Sox' 2011 season. Mayor Thomas Menino declared April 8, 2011, the day of the home opener at Fenway Park, as Lou Gorman Day in Boston. The Red Sox also paid tribute to Gorman during the game that afternoon.

== Legacy ==
Gorman was inducted into the Kinston Professional Baseball Hall of Fame in 1985, the Stonehill College Athletic Hall of Fame in 1989, the Boston Red Sox Hall of Fame in 2002, and the Newport Gulls Hall of Fame in 2010.

In September 2011, the Red Sox established an annual Lou Gorman Award, given to a minor league player in the Red Sox organization "who has demonstrated dedication and perseverance in overcoming obstacles while working his way to the Major League team."

== Works ==
- Gorman, Lou (2005). One Pitch from Glory: A Decade of Running the Red Sox. foreword by Doris Kearns Goodwin. Champaign, Illinois: Sports Publishing, LLC. ISBN 1-59670-067-X.
- Gorman, Lou (2007). High and Inside: My Life in the Front Offices of Baseball. McFarland & Company. ISBN 978-0786431632.

Sporting positions
Preceded by Dick Vertlieb	Seattle Mariners general manager 1977–1980	Succeeded by Dan O'Brien Sr.
Preceded by Haywood Sullivan	Boston Red Sox general manager 1984–1993	Succeeded by Dan Duquette
