= 1990 American League Championship Series =

22nd edition of Major League Baseball's American League Championship Series

Team (Wins)	Managers	Season
Oakland Athletics (4)	Tony La Russa	103–59, .636, GA: 9
Boston Red Sox (0)	Joe Morgan	88–74, .543, GA: 2
- Dates: October 6–10
- MVP: Dave Stewart (Oakland)
- Umpires: Rich Garcia (crew chief); John Hirschbeck; Jim Evans; Terry Cooney; Vic Voltaggio; Larry McCoy

Broadcast
- Television: CBS
- TV announcers: Dick Stockton and Jim Kaat
- Radio: CBS
- Radio announcers: Jim Hunter and Johnny Bench

The 1990 American League Championship Series was a best-of-seven series in Major League Baseball's 1990 postseason that matched the East Division champion Boston Red Sox against the West Division champion Oakland Athletics. For the second time in three years, the Athletics swept the Red Sox four games to none. The sweep was capped by a Roger Clemens ejection in Game 4 for arguing balls and strikes. The Athletics would go on to lose to the Cincinnati Reds in the 1990 World Series in a four-game sweep.

This was the last pennant ever won by the Athletics during their time in Oakland, as the team would move to Las Vegas.

== Background ==
The Athletics finished the regular season with the best record in baseball, at 103–59 (.636), easily winning their third consecutive American League West division title by nine games over the Chicago White Sox. By contrast, the Red Sox ended the season with a record of 88–74 (.543), finishing two games ahead of the Toronto Blue Jays, and claiming their third American League East division title in five years.

== Summary ==
=== Boston Red Sox vs. Oakland Athletics ===
Oakland won the series, 4–0.

Game	Date	Score	Location	Time	Attendance
1	October 6	Oakland Athletics – 9, Boston Red Sox – 1	Fenway Park	3:26	35,192
2	October 7	Oakland Athletics – 4, Boston Red Sox – 1	Fenway Park	3:42	35,070
3	October 9	Boston Red Sox – 1, Oakland Athletics – 4	Oakland-Alameda County Coliseum	2:47	49,026
4	October 10	Boston Red Sox – 1, Oakland Athletics – 3	Oakland-Alameda County Coliseum	3:02	49,052

== Game summaries ==
=== Game 1 ===
Saturday, October 6, 1990, at Fenway Park in Boston, Massachusetts

Team	1	2	3	4	5	6	7	8	9	R	H	E
Oakland	0	0	0	0	0	0	1	1	7	9	13	0
Boston	0	0	0	1	0	0	0	0	0	1	5	1
WP: Dave Stewart (1–0) LP: Larry Andersen (0–1); Home runs: OAK: None; BOS: Wade Boggs (1)

The opening game of the series saw a battle of aces, as Oakland sent Dave Stewart to the hill against Boston's Roger Clemens. The game was a scoreless pitchers' duel until the bottom of the fourth, when Red Sox third baseman Wade Boggs launched a home run off Stewart. Despite mounting scoring threats in each of the next two innings, the Athletics failed to deliver against the "Rocket."

The shot by Boggs turned out to be the only home run in the 1990 ALCS.

Oakland finally came through in the seventh, when Larry Andersen replaced Clemens on the mound. Andersen walked Mark McGwire, who then was forced out at second by the next batter, Walt Weiss. A single by pinch-hitter Jamie Quirk moved Weiss to third, and he came home on a sacrifice fly by Rickey Henderson. In the eighth, the A's took the lead via small ball, as José Canseco singled, was sacrificed over to second by Harold Baines, stole third, and then plated on a single by Carney Lansford.

In the ninth, the wheels came off for the Red Sox bullpen, as Oakland blew the game wide open by erupting for seven runs, a historic distinction done only twice before in the postseason and the first in twenty years. Henderson led the way with a two-run single and a stolen base, Terry Steinbach and Willie Randolph added RBI base hits, and Canseco chipped in with a sacrifice fly. With the game now far from a save situation, A's closer Dennis Eckersley shut Boston down in the bottom half of the inning. giving Oakland a 9–1 victory and a 1–0 series lead.

=== Game 2 ===
Sunday, October 7, 1990, at Fenway Park in Boston, Massachusetts

Team	1	2	3	4	5	6	7	8	9	R	H	E
Oakland	0	0	0	1	0	0	1	0	2	4	13	1
Boston	0	0	1	0	0	0	0	0	0	1	6	0
WP: Bob Welch (1–0) LP: Greg Harris (0–1) Sv: Dennis Eckersley (1)

Game 2 saw the A's Bob Welch, the eventual 1990 American League Cy Young Award winner, take on Boston's Dana Kiecker. The Red Sox struck against Welch in the third, as Luis Rivera doubled, took third on a Jody Reed grounder, and scored on a sacrifice fly by Carlos Quintana. Oakland got the run back the very next half-inning, however, as Willie McGee doubled and scored on a single by Baines.

In the sixth, Boston manager Joe Morgan pulled Kiecker in favor of the bullpen, and as they had in Game 1, the A's went to work. Mike Gallego and Rickey Henderson ripped consecutive singles, and McGee forced Henderson, moving Gallego to third. He came home on a groundout by Baines, giving the A's a 2–1 advantage. In the ninth, the Athletics extended their lead to three runs, courtesy of an RBI double by Baines and a run-scoring single by McGwire. Eckersley worked a 1–2–3 ninth to secure his first save of the series, and Oakland carried a 2–0 ALCS lead back to the Coliseum.

=== Game 3 ===
Tuesday, October 9, 1990, at Oakland-Alameda County Coliseum in Oakland, California

Team	1	2	3	4	5	6	7	8	9	R	H	E
Boston	0	1	0	0	0	0	0	0	0	1	8	3
Oakland	0	0	0	2	0	2	0	0	X	4	6	0
WP: Mike Moore (1–0) LP: Mike Boddicker (0–1) Sv: Dennis Eckersley (2)

For Game 3 in Oakland, the Red Sox threw Mike Boddicker, who had been the 1983 ALCS MVP with the Baltimore Orioles, against the Athletics' Mike Moore. In the second, the Red Sox drew first blood when Mike Greenwell walked, moved up to third on a single by Dwight Evans, and came home on a sacrifice fly by Tom Brunansky. Boston continued to lead until the bottom of the fourth, when the A's struck for two runs. Canseco and Baines both got on base and then executed a double steal, enabling Canseco to subsequently score on a Dave Henderson sacrifice fly and Baines to eventually plate on a single by Randolph.

In the sixth, Oakland added a pair of runs to their lead thanks to some shoddy fielding by the Red Sox. An error by Rivera on a ground ball allowed Baines to reach base, take second on a fly out by McGwire, then move to third when Dave Henderson was forced out by Steinbach. An RBI single by Randolph scored Baines and moved Steinbach to third. Steinbach then boldly tried to steal home and was gunned down, but an error by his Boston counterpart Tony Peña resulted in another run. In the ninth, Eckersley picked up his second save as the A's took a 3–0 stranglehold on the series.

=== Game 4 ===
Wednesday, October 10, 1990, at Oakland-Alameda County Coliseum in Oakland, California

Team	1	2	3	4	5	6	7	8	9	R	H	E
Boston	0	0	0	0	0	0	0	0	1	1	4	1
Oakland	0	3	0	0	0	0	0	0	X	3	6	0
WP: Dave Stewart (2–0) LP: Roger Clemens (0–1) Sv: Rick Honeycutt (1)

The fourth game was a pitching rematch of Game 1, as Stewart again faced Clemens. In the bottom of the second, the "Rocket" gave up consecutive singles to Lansford and Steinbach, and both advanced one base due to a throwing error by Greenwell. McGwire then forced Steinbach, driving in Lansford with the first run of the game.

Randolph was the next batter, and when home plate umpire Terry Cooney adjudged Clemens' fifth pitch to him to be ball four, the Red Sox ace lost his composure, letting loose a stream of profanities. Although Clemens later claimed he was talking to his glove, Cooney assumed the comments were directed at him and promptly ejected Clemens from the game. Video evidence posted on YouTube shows Clemens looking at and talking directly to Cooney. Boston manager Joe Morgan and Clemens fiercely argued the call. The Red Sox bench also exploded, with Clemens' teammates hurling water coolers and litter onto the field. In the end, Clemens and Marty Barrett were thrown out; an angry Barrett was ejected by throwing things onto the field.

The ejection proved to be the turning point of the game, as Gallego proceeded to belt a double to center field off Clemens' replacement, Tom Bolton, scoring both McGwire and Randolph. The Red Sox briefly mounted a last-ditch rally in the top of the ninth, scoring a single run courtesy of an Ellis Burks double and a single by Jody Reed, but Athletics reliever Rick Honeycutt got Greenwell to ground out, handing Oakland its third straight American League pennant.

This was Oakland's last postseason series win until 2006. This was also the last pennant ever won by the Athletics during their time in Oakland, as the team would move to Las Vegas.

== Composite box ==
1990 ALCS (4–0): Oakland Athletics over Boston Red Sox

Team	1	2	3	4	5	6	7	8	9	R	H	E
Oakland Athletics	0	3	0	3	0	2	2	1	9	20	38	1
Boston Red Sox	0	1	1	1	0	0	0	0	1	4	23	5
Total attendance: 168,340 Average attendance: 42,085
