= Randy Kutcher =

American baseball player (born 1960)

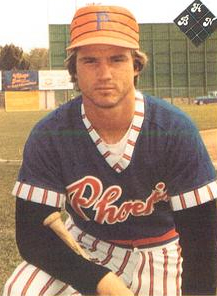
- Kutcher with the Phoenix Giants c. 1983
- Outfielder
- Born: April 20, 1960 (age 65); Anchorage, Alaska, U.S.
- Batted: Right Threw: Right

MLB debut
- June 19, 1986, for the San Francisco Giants

Last MLB appearance
- September 27, 1990, for the Boston Red Sox

MLB statistics
- Batting average: .228
- Home runs: 10
- Runs batted in: 40
- Stats at Baseball Reference

Teams
- San Francisco Giants (1986–1987); Boston Red Sox (1988–1990)

Randy Scott Kutcher (born April 20, 1960) is a former Major League Baseball outfielder and utility infielder. He played for the San Francisco Giants and Boston Red Sox from 1986 through 1990.

Kutcher was born in Anchorage, Alaska and attended Palmdale High School in Palmdale, California, where he also played football and basketball. The Giants drafted him in the fourth round of the 1979 MLB draft. He was a member of two division-winning teams in his three seasons with the Red Sox, in 1988 and 1990, when he and Kevin Romine split duties as reserve outfielders for the Red Sox behind All-Star starters Mike Greenwell, Ellis Burks and Dwight Evans. Kutcher wore jersey number 5 in 1988, later switching to 55.

In 1995, he was a replacement player in spring training for the New York Yankees during the ongoing strike.

In 448 career at bats, Kutcher was a .228 hitter with 10 home runs and 40 runs batted in.
