= Dana Williams (baseball) =

American baseball player (born 1963)

- Left fielder/Designated hitter
- Born: March 20, 1963 (age 63); Weirton, West Virginia
- Batted: Right Threw: Right

MLB debut
- June 19, 1989, for the Boston Red Sox

Last MLB appearance
- July 2, 1989, for the Boston Red Sox

MLB statistics
- Batting average: .200
- Games played: 8
- Hits: 1
- Stats at Baseball Reference

Teams
- Boston Red Sox (1989)

Dana Lamont Williams (born March 20, 1963) is an American former professional baseball player and manager. He appeared in eight games in Major League Baseball (MLB) as an outfielder, designated hitter, and pinch runner for the Boston Red Sox in 1989. Listed at 5 feet 10 inches (1.78 m), 170 pounds (77 kg), he batted and threw right-handed.

== Playing career ==
Williams graduated from Davidson High School in Mobile, Alabama and was signed by the Red Sox as an undrafted free agent out of Enterprise State Community College.

In six MLB plate appearances and five at bats, Williams was a .200 hitter (1-for-5) with a double and one run scored. His double came in the only game he ever started for Boston, on June 25 as the designated hitter in a 7–0 loss to the Minnesota Twins, off left-handed starting pitcher Allan Anderson.

Williams also played in the Red Sox, White Sox and Cubs minor league systems from 1983 through 1990, hitting .291 with 37 home runs and 265 runs batted in in 845 games. He later played in the independent Northern League in 1993 and 1996. Williams was a replacement player with the Pittsburgh Pirates in spring training in 1995 during the ongoing players' strike.

== Coaching career ==
Williams began coaching with the independent Sioux City Explorers in 1996 then joined the Seattle Mariners minor league system in 1997 as a hitting coach. He managed the Arizona Mariners in 2005 and 2006. He was a coach for the independent Washington Wild Things in 2010.

== Personal life ==
Williams is married and has four children.

== See also ==
- 1989 Boston Red Sox season
