= Jeff Gray (baseball, born 1963) =

American baseball player

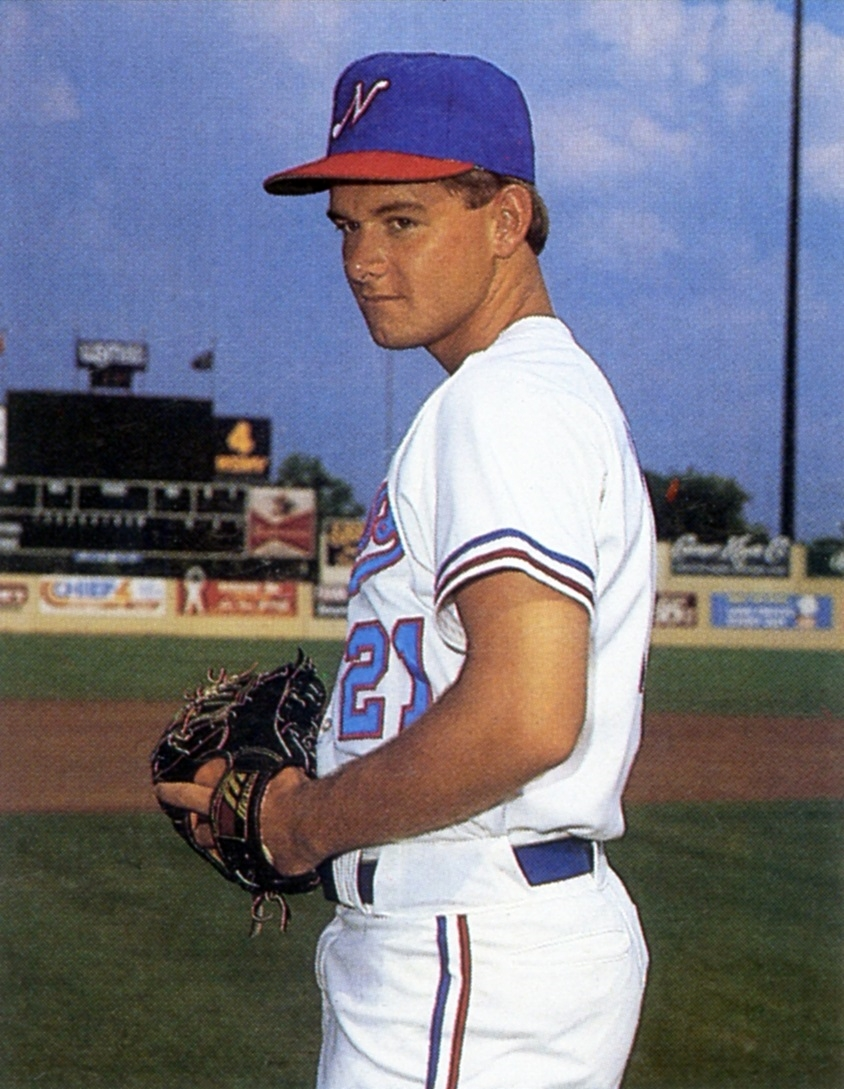
- Gray with the Nashville Sounds in 1987
- Pitcher
- Born: April 10, 1963 (age 63); Richmond, Virginia, U.S.
- Batted: Right Threw: Right

MLB debut
- June 21, 1988, for the Cincinnati Reds

Last MLB appearance
- July 28, 1991, for the Boston Red Sox

MLB statistics
- Win–loss record: 4–7
- Earned run average: 3.33
- Strikeouts: 96
- Stats at Baseball Reference

Teams
- Cincinnati Reds (1988); Boston Red Sox (1990–1991)

Jeffrey Edward Gray (born April 10, 1963) is a former professional baseball relief pitcher who played in Major League Baseball (MLB) for the Cincinnati Reds in 1988 and for the Boston Red Sox in 1990 and 1991. Listed at 6 feet 1 inch (1.85 m) and 175 pounds (79 kg), Gray batted and threw right-handed. He was signed by the Philadelphia Phillies in 1984 out of Florida State University.

== Playing career ==
A forkball specialist, Gray started his professional career in 1984 in the Philadelphia Phillies' minor-league system for two years. He was traded along with John Denny from the Phillies to the Cincinnati Reds for Tom Hume and Gary Redus on December 11, 1985. In 1986, he posted a 14–2 record with a 2.35 ERA and 15 saves for the Double-A Vermont Reds. Gray played in Triple-A for the Nashville Sounds in 1987, compiling a 4.86 ERA in 53 appearances. Returning to Nashville in 1988, he went 8–5 with five saves and a 1.97 in 42 appearances, and was promoted to the Reds during midseason. He recorded a 3.86 ERA in five MLB games and did not have a decision. He returned to Triple-A Nashville for the 1989 season, logging a 3.66 ERA in 44 games.

Gray rejoined the Phillies organization before the 1990 season. At the end of spring training, he was told by the Phillies that he had not made the major-league roster; they asked him to go to Double-A Reading. Gray rejected the offer and signed with the Boston Red Sox organization. After starting the season in Triple-A with the Pawtucket Red Sox, he was promoted to Boston mid-season a become a significant contributor to the American League East division winners. Gray collected nine saves, and seven of them came in seven chances from August 19 through September 10 as he filled in for injured closer Jeff Reardon. In the postseason, Boston was eliminated by the Oakland Athletics in the American League Championship Series; Gray made two appearances, allowing two runs (one earned) in 3 1/3 innings pitched.

Gray returned to Boston for the 1991 season, where he made 50 relief appearances through late July. One of the best middle relievers of the league at this time, he had allowed only 39 hits in 61 2/3 innings, with a 2.34 ERA. Opposing batters had a .181 batting average against him (left-handed .200, right-handed .161).

=== Injury ===
On July 30, 1991, Gray was preparing to go out onto the field for his daily routine when his right side went numb, and he suffered what was later diagnosed as a kind of stroke, ending what had been a brilliant season.

Gray missed the rest of the 1991 and 1992 seasons while recuperating from the stroke. He attempted to return to baseball over the following two seasons, but had lost a lot of velocity on his fastball and was never able to return to the majors.

In a three-season major-league career, Gray posted a 4–7 record with a 3.33 ERA and 10 saves in 96 appearances, including a 3.31 strikeout-to-walk ratio (96-to-29) in 121 2/3 innings pitched.

== Post-playing career ==
Gray returned to the game as a pitching coach. As of 2003, he was the pitching coach for the Gulf Coast League Reds. He was also the co-owner of a Beef O'Brady's restaurant in Sarasota, Florida, along with former Red Sox teammate Jody Reed.

== Sources ==
- The Scouting Report: 1992, STATS, INC./John Dewan and Don Zminda editors, HarperPerennial Publishers.
