= Chuck Cary =

American baseball player (born 1960)

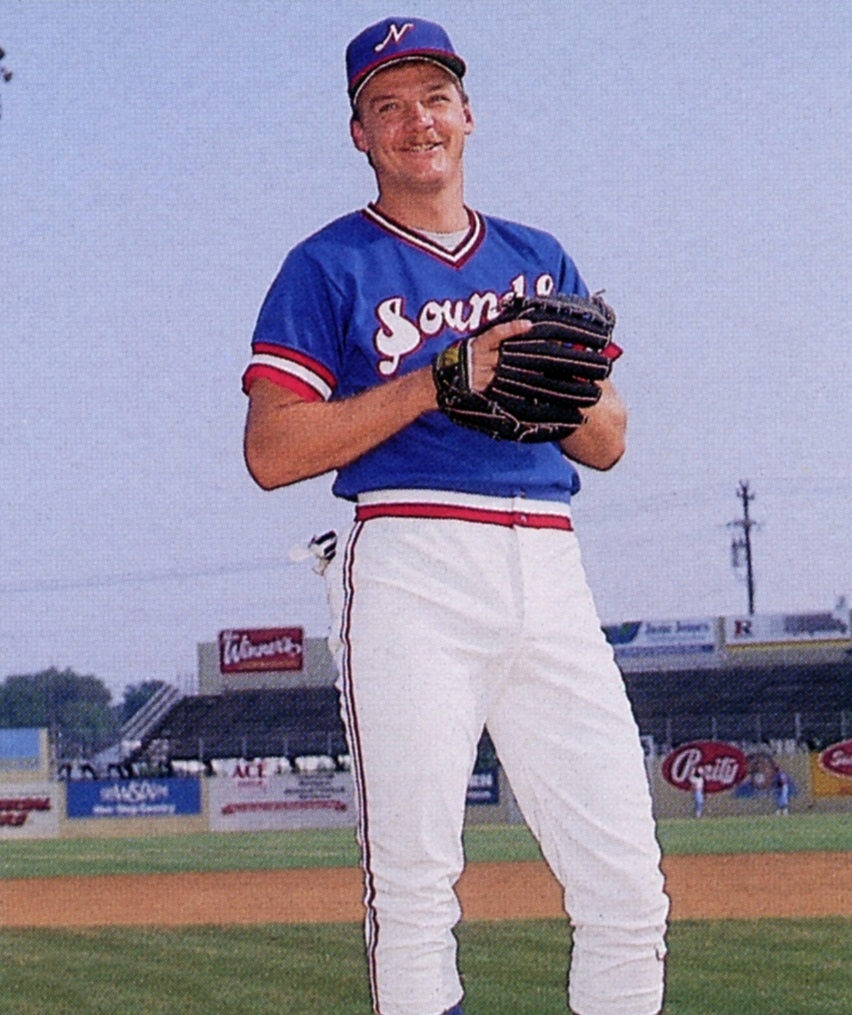
- Cary with the Nashville Sounds in 1986
- Pitcher
- Born: March 3, 1960 (age 66); Whittier, California, U.S.
- Batted: Left Threw: Left

Professional debut
- MLB: August 22, 1985, for the Detroit Tigers
- NPB: August 22, 1992, for the Yomiuri Giants

Last appearance
- MLB: October 2, 1993, for the Chicago White Sox
- NPB: September 26, 1992, for the Yomiuri Giants

MLB statistics
- Win–loss record: 14–26
- Earned run average: 4.17
- Strikeouts: 322

NPB statistics
- Win–loss record: 3–5
- Earned run average: 3.61
- Strikeouts: 35
- Stats at Baseball Reference

Teams
- Detroit Tigers (1985–1986); Atlanta Braves (1987–1988); New York Yankees (1989–1991); Yomiuri Giants (1992); Chicago White Sox (1993)

Charles Douglas Cary (born March 3, 1960) is an American former professional baseball pitcher. He played in Major League Baseball (MLB) from 1985 to 1991, and 1993 for the Detroit Tigers, Atlanta Braves, New York Yankees, and Chicago White Sox. He also played in Nippon Professional Baseball (NPB) for the Tokyo Giants in 1992.

== Career ==
Cary was drafted in the seventh round of the 1981 Major League Baseball draft out of the University of California Berkeley; where he was a member of Chi Phi fraternity and graduated in 1988. Cary pitched in the 1980 College World Series in Omaha, Nebraska, where he defeated the St. Johns Redmen. He was also slated for the win against University of Arizona two nights later, but received a no decision when the Bears lost in the ninth inning.

Cary was a reliever for the Detroit Tigers and Atlanta Braves until a 1988 knee injury cost him most of the season. He came back in 1989 with the New York Yankees. In New York, he spent most of his time in the starting rotation, posting a 4–4 record, with a 3.26 earned run average (ERA) in 1989, and making 27 starts in 1990 going 6–12, with a 4.19 ERA. After one more season with the Yankees, Cary finished his career with 16 relief outings for the White Sox in 1993.
