= Eric Hetzel =

American baseball player (born 1963)

- Pitcher
- Born: September 25, 1963 (age 62); Crowley, Louisiana, U.S.
- Batted: Right Threw: Right

MLB debut
- July 1, 1989, for the Boston Red Sox

Last MLB appearance
- September 13, 1990, for the Boston Red Sox

MLB statistics
- Win–loss record: 3–7
- Earned run average: 6.12
- Strikeouts: 53
- Stats at Baseball Reference

Teams
- Boston Red Sox (1989–1990)

Eric Paul Hetzel (born September 25, 1963) is an American former professional baseball starting pitcher. He played in Major League Baseball (MLB) between 1989 and 1990 for the Boston Red Sox. Listed at 6' 3", 175 lb., Hetzel batted and threw right-handed. He was selected by Boston in the first round (1st pick) of the 1985 draft out of Louisiana State University.

Hetzel spent six years in the Red Sox organization. He debuted in 1985, with Class-A Greensboro, and posted a 7–5 mark with a 5.57 ERA. In 1987 he went 10–12 with a 3.55 ERA for Class-A Winter Haven, after missing a year with an unknown injury. Promoted to Triple-A Pawtucket in 1988, he finished 6–10 with a 3.96 ERA, and went 4–4, 2.48 in 1989, before joining the Red Sox during the midseason. He ended with a 2–3 record and a 6.26 ERA In 11 starts for Boston.

Hetzel started the 1990 season in Pawtucket. Again, he earned a midseason call-up to the Red Sox after going 6–5 with a 3.64 ERA in 18 starts, but he went just 1–4 with 5.91 ERA in eight appearances for the big team. In 1991 he returned for his third stint with Pawtucket, ending with a 9–5 mark and a 3.57 ERA in 19 starts.

In two major league seasons career, Hetzel posted a 3–7 record with 53 strikeouts and a 6.12 ERA in 21 appearances, including 19 starts and 85 1/3 innings of work. In 112 minor league starts, he went 42–41 with 592 strikeouts and a 3.74 ERA in 702 2/3 innings.

A shoulder injury forced him to leave the game.

Hetzel is married to Catherine Arceneaux of Crowley. They have 6 children.

== Sources ==
- The Baseball Cube
- Baseball Reference
