= John Marzano =

American baseball player (1963–2008)

- Catcher
- Born: February 14, 1963; Philadelphia, Pennsylvania, U.S.
- Died: April 19, 2008 (aged 45); Philadelphia, Pennsylvania, U.S.
- Batted: Right Threw: Right

MLB debut
- July 31, 1987, for the Boston Red Sox

Last MLB appearance
- September 23, 1998, for the Seattle Mariners

MLB statistics
- Batting average: .241
- Home runs: 11
- Runs batted in: 72
- Stats at Baseball Reference

Teams
- Boston Red Sox (1987–1992); Texas Rangers (1995); Seattle Mariners (1996–1998)
Medals
Representing United States
Men's baseball
Summer Olympics
Silver medal – second place	1984 Los Angeles	Team
Pan American Games
Bronze medal – third place	1983 Caracas	Team
Intercontinental Cup
Silver medal – second place	1983 Brussels	Team

John Robert Marzano (February 14, 1963 – April 19, 2008), commonly referred to as "Johnny Marz", was an American professional baseball catcher, who played in Major League Baseball (MLB) for the Boston Red Sox, Texas Rangers, and Seattle Mariners, from 1987 to 1992 and 1995 to 1998. Generally utilized as a backup catcher, Marzano was a member of division champions with the 1988 and 1990 Red Sox, and the 1997 Mariners, for whom he posted a .287 batting average. During his playing days, he stood 5 feet 11 inches (1.80 m) tall, weighing 185 pounds (84 kg). Marzano batted and threw right-handed.

== Early life ==
Born in Philadelphia, Pennsylvania, Marzano graduated from its Central High School, and briefly attended Holy Family College, studying radiologic technology. He attended Temple University, where he played catcher for the Owls' baseball team from 1982 to 1984. In 1982, he played collegiate summer baseball with the Wareham Gatemen of the Cape Cod Baseball League. Marzano finished his collegiate career with a .413 batting average. Named an All-American by three different organizations in 1984, he batted .448, with 15 home runs, and 61 RBI. Marzano finished his career as the all-time Temple University leader in batting average, slugging percentage, and tied for the most home runs.

In the 1984 Major League Baseball draft, Marzano was selected in the first round, 14th overall, by the Boston Red Sox of the American League (AL). He was a member of the silver medal-winning Team USA at the 1984 Olympic Games.

== Professional career ==
As a reserve catcher with the Mariners in 1996, Marzano became a cult hero in Seattle when he threw a haymaker at New York Yankees outfielder Paul O'Neill during a game in the Kingdome on Wednesday, August 28. It occurred after O'Neill complained to home plate umpire Rocky Roe about a pitch from reliever Tim Davis was high and inside; the ensuing brawl in the eighth inning resulted in six ejections, including Marzano.

In later years, Marzano was a frequent guest of Phillies Post Game Live on Comcast SportsNet.

He co-hosted a show with Rob Charry on Saturdays, and was also a regular guest on WIP's morning show.

Marzano also appeared often on AT&T Daily News Live with Michael Barkann, on Comcast SportsNet.

The Marzano Baseball Academy, founded in 1991, bears his name.

At the time of his death, Marzano was in his second year of work with Major League Baseball's BaseballChannel.tv. He co-hosted the show Leading Off with Vinny Micucci every weekday morning.

== Death ==
Marzano died unexpectedly, April 19, 2008, at age 45, at his home on Passyunk Avenue, in the city's South Philadelphia neighborhood. He was found after having fallen down a flight of stairs. The Medical Examiner's Office revealed in its July 17 report that Marzano‘s death was actually caused by positional asphyxia, due to the way his body landed after the fall. His last public appearance was on Daily News Live, on Thursday, April 17, from the Wachovia Center.

Marzano is survived by his wife, two daughters, and two grandchildren. He was buried at the Holy Cross Cemetery in Yeadon, Pennsylvania.
