= Mike Rochford =

American baseball player (born 1963)

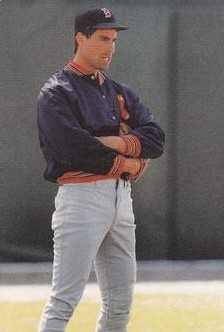
- Pitcher
- Born: March 14, 1963 (age 62); Methuen, Massachusetts, U.S.
- Batted: Left Threw: Left

Professional debut
- MLB: September 3, 1988, for the Boston Red Sox
- NPB: July 15, 1990, for the Yakult Swallows

Last appearance
- MLB: April 16, 1990, for the Boston Red Sox
- NPB: September 29, 1990, for the Yakult Swallows

MLB statistics
- Win–loss record: 0–1
- Earned run average: 9.58
- Strikeouts: 2

NPB statistics
- Win–loss record: 0–3
- Earned run average: 8.61
- Strikeouts: 17
- Stats at Baseball Reference

Teams
- Boston Red Sox (1988–1990); Yakult Swallows (1990)

Michael Joseph Rochford (born March 14, 1963) is an American former relief pitcher in Major League Baseball who played from 1988 through 1990 for the Boston Red Sox. He also pitched for the Yakult Swallows at the end of the 1990 season.

A 6 ft 4 in (1.93 m), 205 lbs. left-handed specialist, Rochford was selected by the Red Sox in the first round of the 1982 January draft out of Santa Fe (Florida) Community College. Prior to college, he was an outstanding three-sport athlete at South Burlington High School, graduating in 1981. In high school, Rochford led the Rebels to Vermont state championships in baseball and football (quarterback) and was one of the best basketball players in the state, scoring over 1,000 career points as a four-year starter. He is the first and only product of a Vermont high school to be selected in the Major League Baseball Amateur Draft and go on to reach the major leagues.

Rochford spent six years in the Boston minor league system before joining the major league club late in 1988.

In parts of three seasons, Rochford posted a record of 0–1, with a 9.58 ERA in eight appearances, giving up 17 runs (11 unearned) on 18 hits and nine walks while striking out two without a save in 10 1/3 innings of work. Over parts of nine minor league seasons, he went 75–64 with a 3.53 ERA in 250 games, including 161 starts. Pitching for Winston-Salem in 1983, Rochford was named to the Carolina League All-Star Team and led Pawtucket in the AAA International League in victories (11) in 1986. He made his major league debut on September 3, 1988, against the California Angels at Anaheim Stadium.

Rochford currently is a golf pro in southern Florida.
