= Dana Kiecker =

American baseball player (born 1961)

- Pitcher
- Born: February 25, 1961 (age 65); Sleepy Eye, Minnesota, U.S.
- Batted: Right Threw: Right

MLB debut
- April 12, 1990, for the Boston Red Sox

Last MLB appearance
- October 1, 1991, for the Boston Red Sox

MLB statistics
- Win–loss record: 10–12
- Earned run average: 4.68
- Strikeouts: 114
- Stats at Baseball Reference

Teams
- Boston Red Sox (1990–1991)

Dana Ervin Kiecker (/ˈkɪkər/ KIK-ər; born February 25, 1961) is a former starting pitcher in Major League Baseball who played for the Boston Red Sox during 1990-1991. He batted and threw right-handed.

== Early years ==
Kiecker was born in Sleepy Eye, Minnesota and raised in Fairfax, Minnesota. He attended Fairfax High School from 1976 to 1979. Kiecker earned four varsity baseball letters during high school. He earned three letters in basketball and two letters in football. Kiecker set the single and career season record for receptions at wide receiver with 36 his senior year. He earned WCCO Radio Prep Parade All-State and KNUJ All-Area accolades as a wide receiver his senior season. Kiecker attended the American Legion Boys' State in 1978 and was selected as the Outstanding Boy's Stater from Minnesota and earned a trip to Boy's Nation in Washington, DC. In 1979, Kiecker was a semi-finalist at the Mr. Minnesota Teen Program. He spent the summer of 1979 working as an intern for Minnesota Governor Al Quie. That summer, Kiecker played on the St Paul Public Safety American Legion baseball team coached by Jake Mauer, Sr. and Jake Mauer, Jr. grandfather and father to MLB catcher Joe Mauer.

== College career ==
Kiecker played college baseball for the St. Cloud State University Huskies and was a freshman on the 1980 Northern Intercolligate Conference championship team which was a rarity among NCAA Division II teams in that it featured two other future Major Leaguers, Jim Eisenreich and Bob Hegman. He earned 4 varsity letters in baseball during his college career. He was named the North Central Conference "Pitcher of the Year" during his senior year at SCSU. He was drafted in the eighth round of the 1983 Major League Baseball draft.

== Professional career ==
Kiecker spent seven years in the minor leagues, having two double-digit win seasons in the A− and A level before finally getting promoted to Triple-A in 1988 with Pawtucket. He spent one further year there before making the 1990 roster out of spring training; he credited working with Oakland catcher Terry Steinbach in granting him confidence that he could make it with his stuff. The 29-year-old rookie made his first major league appearance against the Detroit Tigers on the road on April 12, appearing in the third inning. He went four innings and allowed three runs (two earned) on four hits. He made his first start on April 27 and went 4 1/3 innings while allowing four runs on four hits. He became a mainline starter in May. He won his first game on June 9, going six innings and allowing just one run. In 152 innings, he had a 3.97 ERA with 93 strikeouts to 54 walks with a record of 8-9 and pitched into the 6th inning in 19 of 25 starts. That year, the Red Sox won the American League East and Kiecker was tasked to start Game 2 of the 1990 American League Championship Series against the Oakland Athletics. Kiecker went 5 2/3 innings and allowed one run on six hits with a walk and two strikeouts while matched against Bob Welch. However, the bullpen could not hold its own against Oakland despite a 1-1 tie after six innings to give the Sox a 4-1 loss in a series later ended two games later. It would be the only postseason start by Kiecker. He was named Red Sox Rookie of the Year by the Boston Baseball Writers Association.

Kiecker was utilized in the bullpen for the Sox to start 1991, making just one start in April, which was a 5.1 inning effort (one run allowed) against the Royals on April 28. An inflamed muscle in his right elbow in May saw him miss June and most of July while rehabilitating for a couple games in Triple-A. He made just eight appearances in a major league game after May 26. His last start was on July 31, where he went five innings and allowed seven runs in a no decision. His last appearance in a game was on October 1, going two shutout relief innings. He went 2-3 on the year in 40.1 innings with 23 walks to 21 strikeouts and a 7.36 ERA He required arthroscopic surgery after the season ended and ultimately never played again.

In 1992, Kiecker was released by the Boston Red Sox at the end of spring training. He signed a minor league deal with Cleveland in 1992 but had a second arthroscopic surgery in November. He attended minor league spring training with the Minnesota Twins in 1993, before retiring due to continued elbow soreness. In a two-season career, Kiecker posted a 10-12 record with 114 strikeouts and a 4.68 ERA in 192.1 innings pitched.

== Post-baseball life ==
After retiring from professional baseball in 1993, Kiecker continued to play amateur baseball. In 1993, he turned down a contract offer from the independent St. Paul Saints. He would, however, go on to become a long-serving television analyst for the club.

Kiecker began driving a truck for United Parcel Service in 1988 during his offseasons with the Pawtucket Red Sox. As of August 2004, he had risen to Enterprise Accounts Manager. He became a pitching coach at Dakota County Technical College in 2017 and retired from UPS in 2018 after 27 years of service.

As of 2004, he lived in Eagan, Minnesota with his wife Julie. The couple spends their winters in Naples, Florida.
