= Daryl Irvine =

American baseball player (born 1964)

- Pitcher
- Born: November 15, 1964 (age 60); Harrisonburg, Virginia
- Batted: Right Threw: Right

MLB debut
- April 28, 1990, for the Boston Red Sox

Last MLB appearance
- September 28, 1992, for the Boston Red Sox

MLB statistics
- Win–loss record: 4–5
- Earned run average: 5.68
- Strikeouts: 27
- Stats at Baseball Reference

Teams
- Boston Red Sox (1990–1992)

Daryl Keith Irvine (born November 15, 1964) from Grottoes, Virginia is a former relief pitcher in Major League Baseball who played for the Boston Red Sox (1990–1992). He batted and threw right-handed.

Irvine earned his first major league victory on August 11, 1990. He pitched two scoreless innings (13th and 14th) to pick up the victory during a 4-2 Red Sox win over the Mariners.

In a three-season career, Irvine posted a 4-5 record with 27 strikeouts and a 5.68 ERA in 63-1/3 innings pitched. He now resides in Harrisonburg, Virginia.
