= Tim Naehring =

American baseball player (born 1967)

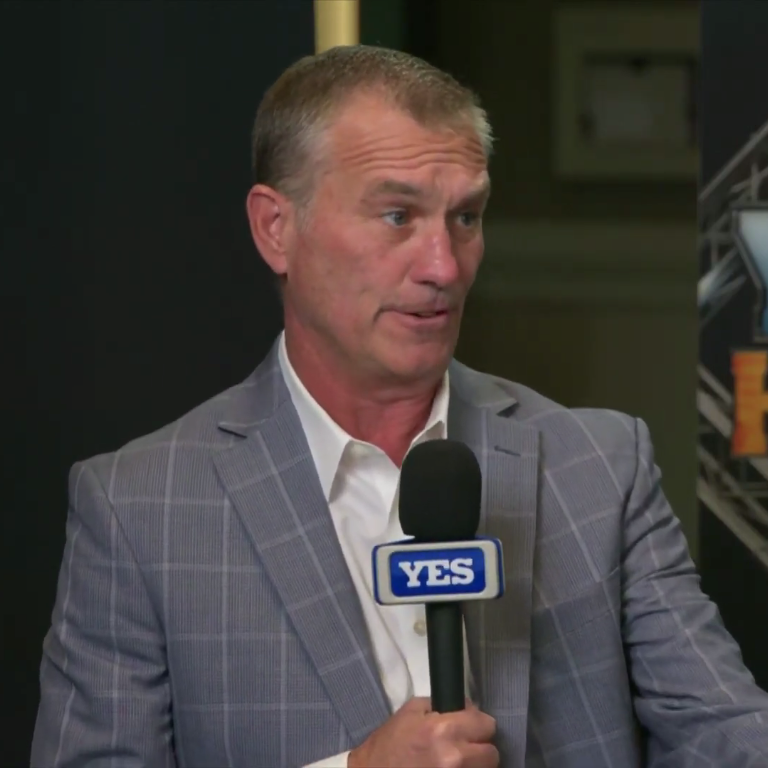
- Naehring at the Winter Meetings in 2022
- Infielder
- Born: February 1, 1967 (age 59); Cincinnati, Ohio, U.S.
- Batted: Right Threw: Right

MLB debut
- July 15, 1990, for the Boston Red Sox

Last MLB appearance
- June 23, 1997, for the Boston Red Sox

MLB statistics
- Batting average: .282
- Home runs: 49
- Runs batted in: 250
- Stats at Baseball Reference

Teams
- Boston Red Sox (1990–1997)

Timothy James Naehring (born February 1, 1967) is an American former Major League Baseball infielder who played for the Boston Red Sox from 1990 to 1997, and who currently works in the front office of the New York Yankees.

== Amateur career ==
Naehring graduated from La Salle High School, and attended Miami University. In 1987, he played collegiate summer baseball with the Cotuit Kettleers of the Cape Cod Baseball League.

== Professional career ==
Naehring was selected by the Red Sox in the 8th round of the 1988 amateur draft. He made his major league debut on July 15, 1990 against the Kansas City Royals.

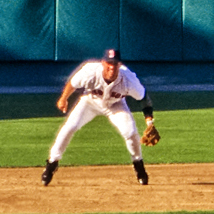
Naehring with the Red Sox in 1996

In his years as a starter, Naehring was a fine-fielding third baseman and solid all-around offensive player. He hit .307 with 10 HR and 57 RBI for the AL East Champion Red Sox in 1995. The following season, he hit .288 and set career highs with 17 HR and 65 RBI. In his final campaign in 1997, Naehring was on his way to having his finest season, as he batted .286 with 9 HR and 40 RBI through just 70 games, but a shoulder injury forced him to miss more than half the games that year. He played his final game on June 23, 1997, against the Toronto Blue Jays. Naehring homered in his second to last at bat.

== Post-playing career ==
After retiring, Naehring was hired as player development director by the Cincinnati Reds. He later was promoted to minor league field coordinator replacing Bob Miscik, who was dismissed in February 2006 by the club. In September 2007, Cincinnati fired Naehring and assistant director of player development Grant Griesser as well as several minor league instructors, coaches and managers as part of a major overhaul of their minor league system. Naehring was hired by the New York Yankees as a scout in December 2007. He became the Vice President of Baseball Operations in 2015, succeeding Billy Eppler.
