= Nick Esasky =

American baseball player (born 1960)

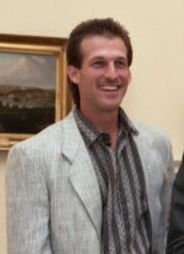
- Esasky in 1989
- First baseman / Third baseman
- Born: February 24, 1960 (age 66); Hialeah, Florida, U.S.
- Batted: Right Threw: Right

MLB debut
- June 19, 1983, for the Cincinnati Reds

Last MLB appearance
- April 21, 1990, for the Atlanta Braves

MLB statistics
- Batting average: .250
- Home runs: 122
- Runs batted in: 427
- Stats at Baseball Reference

Teams
- Cincinnati Reds (1983–1988); Boston Red Sox (1989); Atlanta Braves (1990)

Nicholas Andrew Esasky (born February 24, 1960) is an American former professional baseball corner infielder. He played in Major League Baseball (MLB) from 1983 to 1990, primarily with the Cincinnati Reds.

== Biography ==
Esasky attended high school in Carol City, Florida, a suburb of Miami. He was a selected as a shortstop with the 17th pick of the first round of the 1978 MLB draft. He then had a professional career spanning 1978 to 1992. He reached the Double-A level in 1980, and the Triple-A level in 1981, during which time he played exclusively as a third baseman.

Esasky made his major-league debut with the Cincinnati Reds in 1983 and remained with the team through 1988, playing as a third baseman, first baseman, left fielder and designated hitter. He twice hit more than 20 home runs in a season with the Reds, and had season batting averages ranging from .193 (in 1984) to .272 (in 1987).

In December 1988, Esasky was traded to the Boston Red Sox along with relief pitcher Rob Murphy for first baseman/outfielder Todd Benzinger, pitcher Jeff Sellers, and player to be named later. In his one season with Boston, 1989, Esasky posted career highs in major-league games played (154), batting average (.277), home runs (30), and runs batted in (RBIs; 108).

Esasky became a free agent in November 1989, and signed a three-year contract, reportedly worth $5.7 million, with the Atlanta Braves.

Early in his tenure with the Braves, Esasky was placed on the disabled list and doctors determined he was suffering from vertigo, caused by an inner ear infection. The condition limited him to nine major-league games during the 1990 season, during which he had a .171 batting average. After missing the 1991 season, Esasky played briefly in the minor leagues during 1992, then was released by the Braves in July 1992. He did not play professionally thereafter.

Overall for his major-league career, Esasky appeared in 810 games, compiling a .250 batting average with 122 home runs and 427 RBIs. Defensively, he played 479 games at first base, 230 games at third base, and 98 games in left field. He had a .993 fielding average at first base, .927 fielding average at third base, and did not commit an error in the outfield.
