= Tom Bolton (baseball) =

American baseball player (born 1962)

- Pitcher
- Born: May 6, 1962 (age 62); Nashville, Tennessee, U.S.
- Batted: Left Threw: Left

MLB debut
- May 17, 1987, for the Boston Red Sox

Last MLB appearance
- July 30, 1994, for the Baltimore Orioles

MLB statistics
- Win–loss record: 31–34
- Earned run average: 4.56
- Strikeouts: 336
- Stats at Baseball Reference

Teams
- Boston Red Sox (1987–1992); Cincinnati Reds (1992); Detroit Tigers (1993); Baltimore Orioles (1994)

Thomas Edward Bolton (born May 6, 1962) is an American former professional baseball pitcher. He played in Major League Baseball (MLB) from 1987 through 1994 for the Boston Red Sox, Cincinnati Reds, Detroit Tigers, and Baltimore Orioles. Listed at 6 feet 2 inches (1.88 m) and 172 pounds (78 kg), he batted and threw left-handed.

== Biography ==
A native of Nashville, Tennessee, Bolton helped lead Antioch High School to the Tennessee High School Class AAA state championship in 1979, his junior year. His overall win–loss record as a high school pitcher was 26–4. Bolton was selected by the Boston Red Sox in the 20th round of the 1980 MLB draft.

Bolton's professional baseball career spanned 1980 to 1998, as he appeared in Minor League Baseball during 16 seasons and in MLB during eight seasons. He moved back and forth between being a starting pitcher and being a relief pitcher. He reached MLB in 1987 with the Red Sox, playing in parts of six seasons with them before moving to three other teams late in this career.

Bolton's most productive season came in 1990 with Boston, when he had a 10–5 mark with a 3.38 earned run average (ERA) in 16 starts. He made his only major league postseason appearances that season, pitching a total of three scoreless innings in two games of the 1990 ALCS, as the Red Sox were swept by the Oakland Athletics.

In 1991, Bolton recorded a high-career 19 starts, but went 8–9 with a 5.24 ERA. In July 1992, he was sent to the Cincinnati Reds in the trade that brought Billy Hatcher to the Red Sox. After that, Bolton was used mostly as a middle reliever and left-handed specialist. He spent his last two seasons with the Detroit Tigers (1993) and Baltimore Orioles (1994).

In an eight-season MLB career, Bolton posted a 31–34 record with a 4.56 ERA and 336 strikeouts in 209 appearances, including 56 starts, three complete games, and 540 1/3 innings pitched. He had one save in MLB, which came on August 13, 1988, during a blowout victory against the Tigers, as Bolton pitched the final three innings of 16–4 win. As a batter, Bolton was hitless in 14 major league at bats, all occurring with Cincinnati in 1992. As a fielder, he committed six errors in 117 total chances, for a .949 fielding percentage.

Bolton pitched in the Pacific Coast League for the Calgary Cannons (1996–1997), Tucson Toros (1997) and Nashville Sounds (1998). He was also an assistant pitching coach with the Sounds. In 16 minor league seasons, Bolton went 79–71 with 841 strikeouts and a 3.88 ERA in 1246 2/3 innings.

Bolton was inducted to the Metropolitan Nashville Public Schools sports hall of fame in 2008. He has served as a board member of the Nashville Old Timers Baseball Association. Bolton and his wife, Diane, have three children.
