= John Dopson =

American baseball player (born 1963)

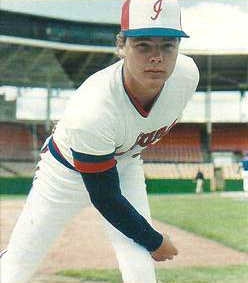
- Dopson with the Indianapolis Indians c. 1986
- Pitcher
- Born: July 14, 1963 (age 62); Baltimore, Maryland, U.S.
- Batted: Left Threw: Right

MLB debut
- September 4, 1985, for the Montreal Expos

Last MLB appearance
- June 22, 1994, for the California Angels

MLB statistics
- Win–loss record: 30–47
- Earned run average: 4.27
- Strikeouts: 386
- Stats at Baseball Reference

Teams
- Montreal Expos (1985, 1988); Boston Red Sox (1989–1993); California Angels (1994)

John Robert Dopson, Jr. (born July 14, 1963) is an American former professional baseball player who pitched in the Major Leagues during 1985, then from 1988 to 1994. He was the last pitcher to balk four times in one game, a feat he achieved on June 13, 1989. Primarily a starter, Dopson recorded his only career save during his last season of 1994.

== See also ==
- Montreal Expos all-time roster
