= Kevin Romine =

American baseball player (born 1961)

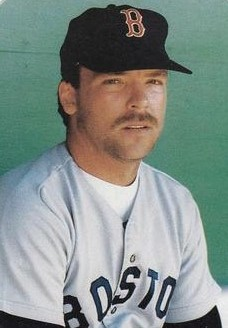
- Right fielder
- Born: May 23, 1961 (age 65); Exeter, New Hampshire, U.S.
- Batted: Right Threw: Right

MLB debut
- September 7, 1985, for the Boston Red Sox

Last MLB appearance
- August 4, 1991, for the Boston Red Sox

MLB statistics
- Batting average: .251
- Home runs: 5
- Runs batted in: 55
- Stats at Baseball Reference

Teams
- Boston Red Sox (1985–1991)

Kevin Andrew Romine (born May 23, 1961) is an American former utility outfielder in Major League Baseball who played for the Boston Red Sox throughout his career (1985–1991).

== Biography ==
Romine attended Fountain Valley High School in Fountain Valley, California, where he played football and baseball. He turned down offers to play college football at Long Beach State and Cal State Fullerton in favor of beginning his college baseball career at Orange Coast College.

A New Hampshire native, Romine batted and threw right-handed. After attending Fountain Valley High School, he had an All-American career at Arizona State University, after which he was selected in the second round of the Major League Baseball amateur draft by the Boston Red Sox and subsequently played six seasons in Boston.

On July 16, 1988, Romine connected off the Kansas City Royals' Steve Farr in the bottom of the ninth for a 7-6 Red Sox victory. Romine accomplished the same feat on July 2, 1990, when he blasted a ninth-inning, game-winning home run off the Texas Rangers' Kenny Rogers. In 1989, Romine set a career high in games, filling in for outfielders Dwight Evans and Ellis Burks, batting .274. On July 2, 1989, Romine went 5 for 5 against the Toronto Blue Jays.

The final home run of his career, on May 5, 1991, off the Chicago White Sox Alex Fernandez, was a grand slam. He was released in the middle of the 1991 season after batting .164.

His career stats included a .251 batting average, with 5 home runs and 55 RBIs. He had 30 doubles and 1 triple in 630 career at bats.

== Personal ==
Romine's two sons have both made it to the major leagues, Andrew and Austin.

After his retirement from baseball, Romine became a police detective in the Los Angeles Police Department (LAPD) where he served for 21 years before retiring in 2016 at the rank of Detective II.
