= Carlos Quintana (baseball) =

Venezuelan baseball player (born 1965)

- Right fielder / First baseman
- Born: August 26, 1965 (age 61); Mamporal, Venezuela
- Batted: Right Threw: Right

MLB debut
- September 16, 1988, for the Boston Red Sox

Last MLB appearance
- October 3, 1993, for the Boston Red Sox

MLB statistics
- Batting average: .276
- Home runs: 19
- Runs batted in: 165
- Stats at Baseball Reference

Teams
- Boston Red Sox (1988–1991, 1993)

Member of the Caribbean

Baseball Hall of Fame
- Induction: 2014

Carlos Narciso Quintana Hernandez (born August 26, 1965) is a Venezuelan former Major League Baseball player who played for the Boston Red Sox from 1988 to 1993.

== Professional career ==
Quintana was signed by the Red Sox in 1984 as an undrafted free agent. Over the next four years, he progressed through the Red Sox minor league system, playing for Elmira, Greensboro, New Britain and Pawtucket.

He made his first appearance for the Red Sox on September 16, 1988. He split the 1989 season between Pawtucket and Boston and earned the starting first baseman role during spring training in 1990, beating out Bill Buckner. Over the next two seasons Quintana earned a reputation as an outstanding defensive first baseman and an intelligent batter who maintained a high on-base percentage, albeit without much power or speed.

In February 1992, Quintana was in a car accident in Tacarigua de Mamporal, Venezuela while rushing his two brothers to a hospital after they were shot at a party. In the accident, Quintana broke his left arm and his right big toe and his wife Solys broke both of her legs. The injuries sidelined for the entire 1992 season.

Quintana returned for the 1993 season but was still feeling the effects of the accident, including numbness in his left thumb. He lost the starting role to Mo Vaughn and announced his retirement from MLB baseball at the end of the season. However, he played more than a season in the Venezuelan League, and spent the 1994 season with the Buffalo Bisons, then a Triple-A affiliate of the Pittsburgh Pirates. In 1998 he played in Italy for Bbc Grosseto and hit four home runs in a game against BC Modena.

He was a .276 hitter (380-for-1376) with 19 home runs and 165 runs batted in, including 163 runs, 59 doubles, one triple and three stolen bases, as well as a .350 on-base percentage and 498 total bases for a .362 slugging average.

== Highlights ==
- In 2014, he gained induction into the Caribbean Baseball Hall of Fame as part of its 18th Class.
- Drove in six runs in the third inning of a game against the Texas Rangers on July 30, 1991, tying the major league record for most RBI in an inning.
- Played in a game in Pawtucket and a game in Boston on the same day in 1989.

== See also ==
- List of Major League Baseball players from Venezuela
- List of Venezuelans

Preceded by Nick Esasky	Boston Red Sox First Baseman; 1990–1991	Succeeded by Mo Vaughn
