= Greg A. Harris =

American baseball player (born 1955)

Greg Harris
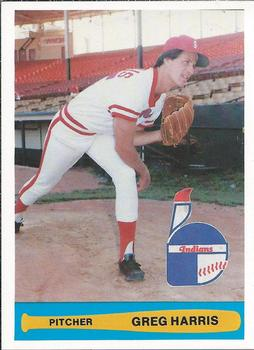
- Pitcher
- Born: November 2, 1955 (age 70); Lynwood, California, U.S.
- Batted: Switch Threw: Right

MLB debut
- May 21, 1981, for the New York Mets

Last MLB appearance
- September 29, 1995, for the Montreal Expos

MLB statistics
- Win–loss record: 74–90
- Earned run average: 3.69
- Strikeouts: 1,141
- Stats at Baseball Reference

Teams
- New York Mets (1981); Cincinnati Reds (1982–1983); Montreal Expos (1984); San Diego Padres (1984); Texas Rangers (1985–1987); Philadelphia Phillies (1988–1989); Boston Red Sox (1989–1994); New York Yankees (1994); Montreal Expos (1995)

Greg Allen Harris (born November 2, 1955) is an American former professional baseball pitcher, who played in Major League Baseball (MLB) for 15 years, 1981–1995. Harris pitched in 703 career games, starting 98. He pitched for eight different teams, including the San Diego Padres when they lost the 1984 World Series to the Detroit Tigers in five games.

Though he spent his career as a right-handed pitcher, Harris threw left-handed to two batters in a 1995 game (the penultimate game of his career), becoming the first switch pitcher to pitch in a major-league game in the modern era. Harris also was unusual in that, for periods during 1991–1993 while pitching for the Boston Red Sox, he achieved success while throwing curveballs almost exclusively.

== Early career ==
Harris attended Los Alamitos High School and then Long Beach City College. He was selected by the New York Mets in the 7th round (130th overall) of the 1976 January Amateur Baseball Draft.

== Switch pitcher ==
A natural right-hander, by 1986 Harris could throw well enough left-handed that he felt he could pitch with either hand in a game, but his team would not allow this, keeping him from being a legitimate ambidextrous major league pitcher. Harris wasn't allowed to throw lefty in a regular season game until September 28, 1995, his penultimate game with the Montreal Expos, while facing his former team, the Cincinnati Reds. In the ninth inning, Harris retired Reggie Sanders pitching right-handed, then switched to his left hand for the next two hitters, Hal Morris and Ed Taubensee, who both batted lefty. Harris walked Morris but got Taubensee to ground out. He then went back to his right hand to retire Bret Boone to end the inning. Harris's glove, which was custom built by Mizuno with an extra thumb so that it could be worn on either hand, is now on display at the National Baseball Hall of Fame.

== Personal life ==
His son, Greg Harris Jr., was drafted by the Los Angeles Dodgers in the 17th round of the 2013 MLB draft and was traded to the Tampa Bay Rays in November 2014.

During his career, Harris was often known as Greg A. Harris to differentiate him from fellow pitcher Greg W. Harris, whose career he overlapped.

== See also ==
- Pat Venditte, a major league pitcher who pitched with either hand
- Tony Mullane, a dead-ball-era pitcher who routinely switch-pitched
