= Mike Greenwell =

American baseball player (1963–2025)

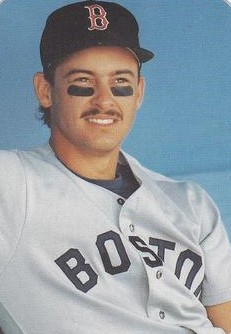
- Greenwell with the Boston Red Sox in 1986
- Left fielder
- Born: July 18, 1963; Louisville, Kentucky, U.S.
- Died: October 9, 2025 (aged 62); Boston, Massachusetts, U.S.
- Batted: Left Threw: Right

Professional debut
- MLB: September 5, 1985, for the Boston Red Sox
- NPB: May 3, 1997, for the Hanshin Tigers

Last appearance
- MLB: September 28, 1996, for the Boston Red Sox
- NPB: May 11, 1997, for the Hanshin Tigers

MLB statistics
- Batting average: .303
- Home runs: 130
- Runs batted in: 726

NPB statistics
- Batting average: .231
- Home runs: 0
- Runs batted in: 5
- Stats at Baseball Reference

Teams
- Boston Red Sox (1985–1996); Hanshin Tigers (1997)

Career highlights and awards
- 2× All Star (1988, 1989); Silver Slugger Award (1988); Boston Red Sox Hall of Fame

Michael Lewis Greenwell (July 18, 1963 – October 9, 2025) was an American left fielder in Major League Baseball (MLB) who played his entire MLB career with the Boston Red Sox (1985–1996). He played seven games for the Hanshin Tigers in Japan (1997), before retiring. Greenwell was nicknamed "the Gator". He batted left-handed and threw right-handed. He was fourth in Rookie of the Year voting in 1987. Greenwell finished as the runner-up for the American League Most Valuable Player (MVP) Award in 1988 after batting .325 along with career highs of 22 home runs and 119 runs batted in (RBIs).

== Early life ==
Greenwell was born in Louisville, Kentucky, on July 18, 1963, to Leonard and Martha Greenwell. When he was five years old, his family relocated to Fort Myers, Florida. He attended North Fort Myers High School, where he played both baseball and football.

== Baseball career ==
=== Major League Baseball ===
Greenwell was drafted in the third round of the 1982 Major League Baseball draft by the Red Sox, and was signed on June 9, 1982. Since 1940, Boston's left fielders had included Ted Williams, Carl Yastrzemski and Jim Rice—all MVP winners, regular triple crown candidates, and eventual members of the Baseball Hall of Fame. While not reaching those levels, Greenwell provided a solid and reliable presence in the team's lineup for several seasons. He also served as the team's player representative for a time.

Greenwell finished fourth in Rookie of the Year voting in 1987. On September 14, 1988, Greenwell hit for the cycle, becoming the 17th player to do so in Red Sox franchise history. During the 1988 season, Greenwell batted .325 on average with 192 hits and second in the league in on-base percentage (OBP). The hits were a career high, as were his 22 home runs, 39 doubles, and 119 RBIs. He set the American League record for most game-winning RBIs in a single season with 23; the game-winning RBI has since been discontinued as an official statistic. Greenwell was runner-up for the 1988 American League MVP Award to Jose Canseco of the Oakland Athletics. Canseco had the first 40 home run, 40 stolen base season in baseball history; years later, his admission of steroid use led Greenwell to ask, "Where's my MVP?"

On September 2, 1996, the Red Sox beat the Seattle Mariners 9–8 in 10 innings at the Kingdome, with Greenwell driving in all nine runs for the Sox, a record for most runs driven in by one player accounting for all of that team's runs in a single game. He was inducted to the Boston Red Sox Hall of Fame in 2008.

==== Career MLB statistics ====
G	AB	R	H	2B	3B	HR	RBI	SB	CS	BB	SO	BA	OBP	SLG	TB	SH	HBP	FLD%
1269	4623	657	1400	275	38	130	726	80	43	460	364	.303	.368	.463	2141	3	39	.981

==== "The Gator" ====
Greenwell received his nickname during spring training in Winter Haven. He had captured an alligator, taped its mouth shut, and put it in Ellis Burks' locker.

=== Nippon Professional Baseball ===
Greenwell signed with the Hanshin Tigers of Nippon Professional Baseball in 1997. His career in the major leagues heightened expectations from Japanese fans, but he left the team during spring training and returned to the United States; he had suffered a herniated disc when diving for a ball. He did not return to Japan until late April. He played his first game on May 3, and hit an RBI triple in that game despite having missed spring training. However, Greenwell suddenly announced his retirement after appearing in just seven games; he had fractured his right foot with a foul tip, and the injury would have prevented him from playing for at least four weeks.

=== Coaching ===
In 2001, Greenwell was hired during the offseason as a player-coach for the Cincinnati Reds' Double-A affiliate in Chattanooga, Tennessee. Greenwell was also the interim hitting coach for the Reds in 2001, filling in when Ken Griffey Sr. was given a medical leave of absence.

== Racing career ==
Mike Greenwell

NASCAR FedEx Freight Truck Series career
- 2 races run over 1 year
- Best finish: 69th (2006)
- First race: 2006 City of Mansfield 250 (Mansfield)
- Last race: 2006 O'Reilly 200 (Memphis)
Wins	Top tens	Poles
0	0	0

Upon his retirement from baseball, Greenwell began driving late model stock cars at New Smyrna Speedway, winning the 2000 Speedweeks track championship. In May 2006, he made his Craftsman Truck Series debut at Mansfield Motorsports Park for Green Light Racing, starting 20th and finishing 26th. In 2010, Greenwell gave up racing.

=== Motorsports career results ===
NASCAR

(key) (Bold – Pole position awarded by qualifying time. Italics – Pole position earned by points standings or practice time. * – Most laps led.)

Craftsman Truck Series

NASCAR Craftsman Truck Series results
Year	Team	No.	Make	1	2	3	4	5	6	7	8	9	10	11	12	13	14	15	16	17	18	19	20	21	22	23	24	25	NCTC	Pts	Ref
2006	Green Light Racing	08	Chevy	DAY	CAL	ATL	MAR	GTY	CLT	MFD; 26	DOV	TEX	MCH	MLW	KAN	KEN	MEM; 33	IRP	NSH	BRI	NHA	LVS	TAL	MAR	ATL	TEX	PHO	HOM	69th	149	

== Personal life and death ==
In 2022, Greenwell was appointed by Florida governor Ron DeSantis to serve the remaining term of county commissioner Franklin B. Mann after Mann had died. Greenwell was reelected for a full term in 2024, defeating Amanda Cochran in the Republican primary and Kizzie Fowler in the general election.

Greenwell operated several businesses, including Big League Builders, a general construction company. Greenwell owned an 890-acre (3.6 km^{2}) ranch in Alva, Florida, which, as a developer and county commissioner, he rezoned in 2023 for land development to include new housing and commercial units. He owned an amusement park in Cape Coral, Florida called Mike Greenwell's Bat-A-Ball & Family Fun Park, which opened in 1992. The park is now currently under different ownership and was renamed Gator Mike's in honor of Greenwell.

Greenwell's wife Tracy was a nurse, and they had two sons, both of whom Greenwell coached. Bo was drafted as an outfielder in the sixth round of the 2007 MLB draft; he spent eight years in the minor leagues in the farm systems of the Cleveland Indians (2007–2013) and the Red Sox (2014). First baseman Garrett started at Santa Fe College in 2011 before transferring to Oral Roberts University in 2013. Greenwell was the uncle of Joey Terdoslavich, who played for the Atlanta Braves (2013–2015).

In mid-August 2025, Greenwell announced that he had been diagnosed with medullary thyroid cancer. He died two months later on October 9 at the age of 62.

== See also ==
- List of Major League Baseball players who spent their entire career with one franchise
- List of Major League Baseball players to hit for the cycle

Achievements
Preceded by Chris Speier	Hitting for the cycle September 14, 1988	Succeeded by Kelly Gruber
