= 1988 Boston Red Sox season =

Major League Baseball season

1988 Boston Red Sox
- American League East champions
- League: American League
- Division: East
- Ballpark: Fenway Park
- City: Boston, Massachusetts
- Record: 89–73 (.549)
- Divisional place: 1st
- Owners: Jean Yawkey, Haywood Sullivan
- President: John Harrington (Note: The Red Sox list 1987–2001 as Harrington's tenure as president, although the team's 1988 media guide listed Jean Yawkey as president.)
- General manager: Lou Gorman
- Managers: John McNamara (43–42); Joe Morgan (46–31)
- Television: WSBK-TV, Ch. 38 (Sean McDonough, Bob Montgomery); NESN (Ned Martin, Jerry Remy)
- Radio: WPLM-FM 99.1; WPLM-AM 1390 (Ken Coleman, Joe Castiglione); WRCA (Bobby Serrano, Hector Martinez)
- Stats: ESPN.com; Baseball Reference

The 1988 Boston Red Sox season was the 88th season in the franchise's Major League Baseball history. The Red Sox finished first in the American League East with a record of 89–73 but were then swept by the Oakland Athletics in the ALCS.

The team is best remembered for its change of fortune following its change of manager; after John McNamara was replaced by Joe Morgan, the team won its next 12 games in a stretch nicknamed "Morgan Magic".

== Offseason ==
- December 8, 1987: Lee Smith was traded by the Chicago Cubs to the Red Sox for Al Nipper and Calvin Schiraldi.
- January 5, 1988: Dennis Lamp was signed as a free agent with the Red Sox.

== Regular season ==
Record by month
Month	Record		Cumulative		AL East		Ref.
Month	Won	Lost	Won	Lost	Position	GB	Ref.
April	14	6	14	6	2nd	1	
May	11	16	25	22	4th	7	
June	14	12	39	34	3rd	6	
July	21	9	60	43	3rd	1 1/2	
August	13	16	73	59	2nd	2	
September	16	12	89	71	1st	+3	
October	0	2	89	73	1st	+1	

=== Highlights ===
A rough beginning

The 1988 team seemed to start much better than their chaotic 1987 predecessors, going 14–6 in April; however, the team went sour thereafter, especially for Jim Rice as he moved from left field to designated hitter. Dwight Evans also had problems when he played first base, and the usually reliable Lee Smith had problems closing, including giving up a game-winning home run to the Detroit Tigers on Opening Day.

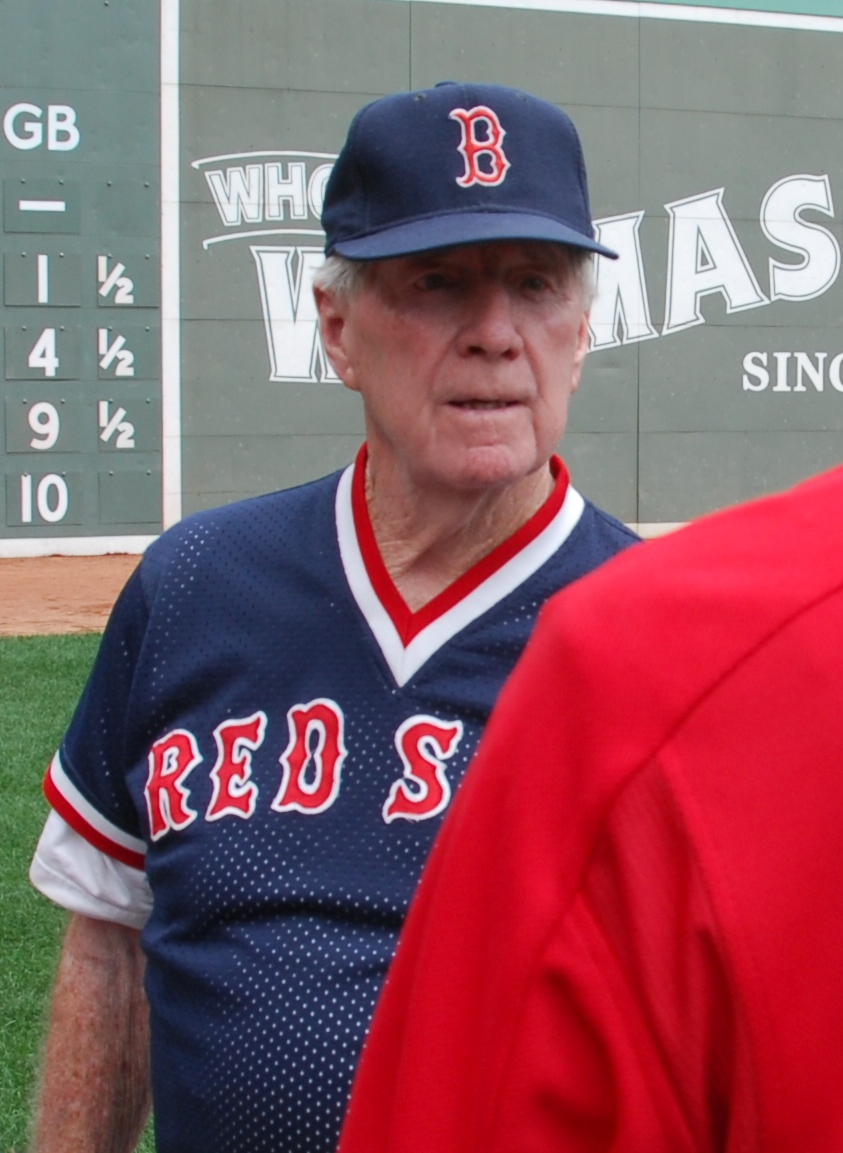
Joe Morgan

The Red Sox had an 11–16 record in May, followed by a slightly better June with a 14–12 record, but lost pitcher Jeff Sellers when he was hit by a line drive in Cleveland that broke his hand. Wes Gardner was moved from the bullpen to the rotation, but the team and its fans were losing patience.

"Morgan Magic"

At the All-Star break, the Red Sox were 43–42, nine games behind the Tigers in the AL East standings. Management had seen enough, firing John McNamara and elevating third base coach Joe Morgan to manager.

On July 15, the first game after the All-Star break, the Red Sox and Roger Clemens beat the Kansas City Royals and Bret Saberhagen, 3–1. This began a 12-game winning streak, which launched the Red Sox to first place over the slumping Tigers and New York Yankees. The Red Sox would later set an American League record of 24 straight home victories. Two months after Morgan became manager, the team was 81–63 and in first place by 4 1/2 games. The team cooled off in the final two weeks of the season, finishing with nine losses in their final 13 games, but held on to win the AL East, finishing one game ahead of the Tigers, for their second division title in three seasons.

=== Season standings ===
AL East
Team	W	L	Pct.	GB	Home	Road
Boston Red Sox	89	73	.549	—	53‍–‍28	36‍–‍45
Detroit Tigers	88	74	.543	1	50‍–‍31	38‍–‍43
Milwaukee Brewers	87	75	.537	2	47‍–‍34	40‍–‍41
Toronto Blue Jays	87	75	.537	2	45‍–‍36	42‍–‍39
New York Yankees	85	76	.528	3½	46‍–‍34	39‍–‍42
Cleveland Indians	78	84	.481	11	44‍–‍37	34‍–‍47
Baltimore Orioles	54	107	.335	34½	34‍–‍46	20‍–‍61

=== Record vs. opponents ===
1988 American League record Sources:
Team	BAL	BOS	CAL	CWS	CLE	DET	KC	MIL	MIN	NYY	OAK	SEA	TEX	TOR
Baltimore	—	4–9	5–7	4–7	4–9	5–8	0–12	4–9	3–9	3–10	4–8	7–5	6–6	5–8
Boston	9–4	—	8–4	7–5	8–5	6–7	6–6	10–3	7–5	9–4	3–9	6–6	8–4	2–11
California	7–5	4–8	—	9–4	8–4	5–7	5–8	3–9	4–9	6–6	4–9	6–7	8–5	6–6
Chicago	7–4	5–7	4–9	—	3–9	3–9	7–6	6–6	4–9	3–9	5–8	9–4	8–5	7–5
Cleveland	9–4	5–8	4–8	9–3	—	4–9	6–6	9–4	5–7	6–7	4–8	5–7	6–6	6–7
Detroit	8–5	7–6	7–5	9–3	9–4	—	8–4	5–8	1–11	8–5	4–8	9–3	8–4	5–8
Kansas City	12–0	6–6	8–5	6–7	6–6	4–8	—	3–9	7–6	6–6	8–5	7–5	7–6	4–8
Milwaukee	9–4	3–10	9–3	6–6	4–9	8–5	9–3	—	7–5	6–7	3–9	8–4	8–4	7–6
Minnesota	9–3	5–7	9–4	9–4	7–5	11–1	6–7	5–7	—	3–9	5–8	8–5	7–6	7–5
New York	10–3	4–9	6–6	9–3	7–6	5–8	6–6	7–6	9–3	—	6–6	5–7	5–6	6–7
Oakland	8–4	9–3	9–4	8–5	8–4	8–4	5–8	9–3	8–5	6–6	—	9–4	8–5	9–3
Seattle	5–7	6–6	7–6	4–9	7–5	3–9	5–7	4–8	5–8	7–5	4–9	—	6–7	5–7
Texas	6–6	4–8	5–8	5–8	6–6	4–8	6–7	4–8	6–7	6–5	5–8	7–6	—	6–6
Toronto	8–5	11–2	6–6	5–7	7–6	8–5	8–4	6–7	5–7	7–6	3–9	7–5	6–6	—

=== Notable transactions ===
- April 15, 1988: Rick Cerone signed as a free agent with the Red Sox.
- July 29, 1988: Brady Anderson was traded by the Red Sox with minor league pitcher Curt Schilling to the Baltimore Orioles for Mike Boddicker.

=== Opening Day lineup ===
5	Brady Anderson	CF
17	Marty Barrett	2B
26	Wade Boggs	3B
14	Jim Rice	LF
39	Mike Greenwell	RF
24	Dwight Evans	1B
30	Sam Horn	DH
10	Rich Gedman	C
7	Spike Owen	SS
21	Roger Clemens	P

=== Alumni game ===
The team held an old-timers game on May 14, before a scheduled home game against the Seattle Mariners. The alumni game marked the 40th anniversary of the 1948 Red Sox team, which had lost a one-game playoff to the Cleveland Indians. The visiting (non-Red Sox) alumni team, skippered by Lou Boudreau—who had been player-manager of the 1948 Cleveland squad—prevailed by an 8–2 score, led by four RBIs from former Pittsburgh Pirate Manny Sanguillén.

=== Roster ===
1988 Boston Red Sox
**Roster**
**Pitchers**: 52 Mike Boddicker; 50 Tom Bolton; 23 Oil Can Boyd; 21 Roger Clemens; 56 Zach Crouch; 53 Steve Curry; 28 Steve Ellsworth; 44 Wes Gardner; 47 Bruce Hurst; 15 Dennis Lamp; 54 Mike Rochford; 19 Jeff Sellers; 48 Lee Smith; 41 Mike Smithson; 46 Bob Stanley; 42 John Trautwein; 45 Rob Woodward	**Catchers**: 6 Rick Cerone; 10 Rich Gedman; 20 John Marzano; **Infielders**: 17 Marty Barrett; 38 Todd Benzinger; 26 Wade Boggs; 27 Pat Dodson; 7 Spike Owen; 25 Larry Parrish; 3 Jody Reed; 11 Ed Romero	**Outfielders**: 5 Brady Anderson; 12 Ellis Burks; 24 Dwight Evans; 39 Mike Greenwell; 55 Randy Kutcher; 18 Carlos Quintana; 14 Jim Rice; 16 Kevin Romine; **Other batters**: 30 Sam Horn	**Manager**: 2 John McNamara; 35 Joe Morgan; **Coaches**: 37 Al Bumbry (First Base); 34 Bill Fischer (Pitching); 33 Walt Hriniak (Hitting); 32 Jerry McNertney (Bullpen); 35 Joe Morgan (Third Base); 36 Rac Slider (Bullpen, Third Base)

=== Game log ===
Past games legend
Red Sox Win (#bfb)	Red Sox Loss (#fbb)	Game postponed (#bbb)	All-Star Game (#bbcaff)	Clinched Division (#039)
Bold denotes a Red Sox pitcher

1988 Regular Season Game Log (89–73) (Home: 53–28; Road: 36–45)
April (14–6) (Home: 8–4; Road: 6–2)

#	Date	Opponent	Score	Win	Loss	Save	Crowd	Record	Streak
1	April 4	Tigers	3–5 (10)	Morris (1–0)	**Smith** (0–1)	Henneman (1)	34,781	0–1	L1
2	April 6	Tigers	6–5	**Lamp** (1–0)	Hernández (0–1)	**Smith** (1)	16,965	1–1	W1
3	April 7	Tigers	6–11	Tanana (1–0)	**Ellsworth** (0–1)		13,807	1–2	L1
4	April 8	@ Rangers	4–0	**Boyd** (1–0)	Jeffcoat (0–1)		18,470	2–2	W1
5	April 9	@ Rangers	2–1	**Clemens** (1–0)	Hough (1–1)	**Smith** (2)	27,527	3–2	W2
6	April 10	@ Rangers	1–4	Kilgus (1–0)	**Sellers** (0–1)	Williams (2)	14,024	3–3	L1
—	April 11	Brewers	Postponed (Cold); Makeup: July 29						
7	April 12	Brewers	3–1	**Hurst** (1–0)	Bosio (1–1)	**Smith** (3)	12,045	4–3	W1
8	April 13	Brewers	6–3	**Boyd** (2–0)	Nieves (0–2)	**Smith** (4)	14,114	5–3	W2
9	April 14	Brewers	2–0	**Clemens** (2–0)	Wegman (0–2)		15,693	6–3	W3
10	April 15	Rangers	2–3 (10)	Hough (2–1)	**Gardner** (0–1)		12,369	6–4	L1
11	April 16	Rangers	0–2	Kilgus (2–0)	**Ellsworth** (0–2)	Williams (4)	25,936	6–5	L2
12	April 17	Rangers	15–2	**Hurst** (2–0)	Jeffcoat (0–2)		32,243	7–5	W1
13	April 18	Rangers	4–3	**Smith** (1–1)	Williams (0–1)		33,976	8–5	W2
14	April 19	@ Tigers	7–3	**Clemens** (3–0)	Morris (2–2)		11,920	9–5	W3
—	April 20	@ Tigers	Postponed (Rain); Makeup: August 5						
15	April 21	@ Tigers	12–3	**Ellsworth** (1–2)	Robinson (1–2)		13,862	10–5	W4
—	April 22	@ Brewers	Postponed (Rain); Makeup: April 25						
—	April 23	@ Brewers	Postponed (Rain); Makeup: August 9						
16	April 24	@ Brewers	4–0	**Clemens** (4–0)	Higuera (2–1)		16,379	11–5	W5
17	April 25	@ Brewers	5–1	**Hurst** (3–0)	Wegman (1–3)		11,109	12–5	W6
—	April 26	@ White Sox	Postponed (Rain); Makeup: July 8						
—	April 27	@ White Sox	Postponed (Rain); Makeup: July 9						
18	April 28	@ White Sox	0–6	LaPoint (3–1)	**Boyd** (2–1)		8,204	12–6	L1
19	April 29	Twins	6–5	**Smith** (2–1)	Berenguer (3–3)		32,022	13–6	W1
20	April 30	Twins	8–3	**Hurst** (4–0)	Lea (0–3)	**Gardner** (1)	32,708	14–6	W2

May (11–16) (Home: 6–8; Road: 5–8)

#	Date	Opponent	Score	Win	Loss	Save	Crowd	Record	Streak
21	May 1	Twins	0–2	Viola (3–1)	**Sellers** (0–2)		31,124	14–7	L1
22	May 2	Royals	0–2	Bannister (4–1)	**Ellsworth** (1–3)	Garber (4)	20,400	14–8	L2
23	May 3	Royals	3–9	Saberhagen (4–2)	**Boyd** (2–2)		21,602	14–9	L3
24	May 4	White Sox	2–6	McDowell (2–2)	**Clemens** (4–1)		21,191	14–10	L4
25	May 5	White Sox	16–3	**Hurst** (5–0)	Horton (3–4)		24,135	15–10	W1
26	May 6	@ Twins	0–5	Viola (4–1)	**Sellers** (0–3)		29,767	15–11	L1
27	May 7	@ Twins	2–5	Blyleven (2–3)	**Ellsworth** (1–4)		33,416	15–12	L2
28	May 8	@ Twins	10–6	**Boyd** (3–2)	Mason (0–1)		28,896	16–12	W1
29	May 9	@ Royals	2–0	**Clemens** (5–1)	Gubicza (3–4)		24,806	17–12	W2
30	May 10	@ Royals	2–7	Bannister (5–2)	**Hurst** (5–1)		21,645	17–13	L1
31	May 13	Mariners	14–8	**Boyd** (4–2)	Campbell (2–5)	**Gardner** (2)	29,582	18–13	W1
32	May 14	Mariners	3–0	**Clemens** (6–1)	Bankhead (0–1)		33,846	19–13	W2
33	May 15	Mariners	7–11	Jackson (1–1)	**Smith** (2–2)		33,109	19–14	L1
34	May 16	Athletics	0–3	Davis (4–1)	**Sellers** (0–4)	Eckersley (14)	24,642	19–15	L2
35	May 17	Athletics	7–12	Ontiveros (2–1)	**Ellsworth** (1–5)	Honeycutt (4)	28,407	19–16	L3
36	May 18	Athletics	4–1	**Boyd** (5–2)	Stewart (8–2)	**Smith** (5)	24,683	20–16	W1
37	May 20	Angels	2–4 (10)	Buice (1–2)	**Clemens** (6–2)	Harvey (2)	31,032	20–17	L1
38	May 21	Angels	8–4	**Hurst** (6–1)	Krawczyk (0–1)	**Smith** (6)	32,180	21–17	W1
39	May 22	Angels	12–4	**Stanley** (1–0)	Fraser (4–3)		32,678	22–17	W2
40	May 23	@ Mariners	3–14	Swift (4–1)	**Boyd** (5–3)		15,511	22–18	L1
41	May 24	@ Mariners	1–14	Campbell (3–5)	**Smithson** (0–1)		9,473	22–19	L2
42	May 25	@ Mariners	4–0	**Clemens** (7–2)	Langston (4–4)		17,968	23–19	W1
43	May 27	@ Athletics	2–3	Young (4–2)	**Hurst** (6–2)	Eckersley (15)	32,723	23–20	L1
44	May 28	@ Athletics	5–7	Honeycutt (1–0)	**Lamp** (1–1)	Eckersley (16)	43,177	23–21	L2
45	May 29	@ Athletics	4–5	Nelson (3–2)	**Sellers** (0–5)	Plunk (2)	43,427	23–22	L3
46	May 30	@ Angels	5–2	**Clemens** (8–2)	Petry (2–4)		46,598	24–22	W1
47	May 31	@ Angels	4–3	**Smithson** (1–1)	Fraser (4–4)		24,005	25–22	W2

June (14–12) (Home: 7–6; Road: 7–6)

#	Date	Opponent	Score	Win	Loss	Save	Crowd	Record	Streak
48	June 2	Blue Jays	4–5	Wells (3–2)	**Hurst** (6–3)	Eichhorn (1)	32,144	25–23	L1
49	June 3	Blue Jays	3–6	Stottlemyre (2–7)	**Boyd** (5–4)	Henke (10)	32,292	25–24	L2
50	June 4	Blue Jays	2–10	Clancy (3–5)	**Clemens** (8–3)	Ward (4)	33,067	25–25	L3
51	June 5	Blue Jays	4–12	Ward (2–0)	**Smithson** (1–2)		33,756	25–26	L4
52	June 6	@ Yankees	3–2	**Hurst** (7–3)	Allen (2–1)	**Smith** (7)	37,244	26–26	W1
53	June 7	@ Yankees	3–4	Hudson (5–2)	**Boyd** (5–5)	Guante (6)	37,081	26–27	L1
54	June 8	@ Yankees	4–3	**Clemens** (9–3)	John (4–2)	**Smith** (8)	42,804	27–27	W1
55	June 10	@ Blue Jays	0–3	Stieb (8–3)	**Sellers** (0–6)	Henke (11)	35,201	27–28	L1
56	June 11	@ Blue Jays	3–4 (10)	Ward (3–0)	**Lamp** (1–2)		40,461	27–29	L2
57	June 12	@ Blue Jays	8–2	**Boyd** (6–5)	Cerutti (3–3)		40,123	28–29	W1
58	June 13	Yankees	6–12	Dotson (7–1)	**Clemens** (9–4)	Guante (7)	34,288	28–30	L1
59	June 14	Yankees	7–3	**Smithson** (2–2)	Allen (2–2)	**Smith** (9)	33,367	29–30	W1
60	June 15	Yankees	8–3	**Hurst** (8–3)	Leiter (4–3)		33,870	30–30	W2
61	June 16	@ Orioles	4–8	Ballard (3–3)	**Trautwein** (0–1)	Williamson (1)	24,499	30–31	L1
62	June 17	@ Orioles	2–3 (11)	Schmidt (3–2)	**Lamp** (1–3)		34,340	30–32	L2
63	June 18	@ Orioles	5–0	**Clemens** (10–4)	Bautista (2–6)		32,175	31–32	W1
64	June 19	@ Orioles	15–7	**Gardner** (1–1)	Noles (0–2)		31,046	32–32	W2
65	June 20	@ Indians	14–7	**Hurst** (9–3)	Swindell (10–5)		19,870	33–32	W3
66	June 21	@ Indians	10–6	**Stanley** (2–0)	Rodriguez (0–1)	**Smith** (10)	26,681	34–32	W4
67	June 22	@ Indians	1–3	Farrell (8–4)	**Boyd** (6–6)	Jones (17)	18,843	34–33	L1
68	June 24	Orioles	2–6	Bautista (3–6)	**Clemens** (10–5)		35,333	34–34	L2
69	June 25	Orioles	10–3	**Stanley** (3–0)	Williamson (1–5)		34,573	35–34	W1
70	June 26	Orioles	10–1	**Smithson** (3–2)	Peraza (1–3)		34,374	36–34	W2
71	June 27	Indians	9–5	**Lamp** (2–3)	Farrell (8–5)		33,318	37–34	W3
72	June 28	Indians	6–1	**Gardner** (2–1)	Bailes (6–7)		34,661	38–34	W4
73	June 29	Indians	5–1	**Clemens** (11–5)	Candiotti (7–7)	**Smith** (11)	35,035	39–34	W5

July (21–9) (Home: 15–0; Road: 6–9)

#	Date	Opponent	Score	Win	Loss	Save	Crowd	Record	Streak
74	July 1	@ Royals	7–8	Montgomery (1–1)	**Ellsworth** (1–6)	Farr (6)	25,970	39–35	L1
75	July 2	@ Royals	1–3	Leibrandt (4–10)	**Boyd** (6–7)	Farr (7)	37,098	39–36	L2
76	July 3	@ Royals	2–3	Montgomery (2–1)	**Smith** (2–3)	Farr (8)	36,220	39–37	L3
77	July 4	@ Royals	9–2	**Clemens** (12–5)	Power (4–2)		40,804	40–37	W1
78	July 5	@ Twins	4–6	Berenguer (8–3)	**Smith** (2–4)	Reardon (23)	44,091	40–38	L1
79	July 6	@ Twins	1–8	Viola (14–2)	**Hurst** (9–4)		41,027	40–39	L2
80	July 7	@ Twins	4–3	**Boyd** (7–7)	Lea (5–4)	**Stanley** (1)	32,724	41–39	W1
81	July 8	@ White Sox	5–6	John Davis (2–2)	**Smithson** (3–3)	Thigpen (16)	–	41–40	L1
82	July 8	@ White Sox	10–7	**Lamp** (3–3)	Long (3–4)		18,963	42–40	W1
83	July 9	@ White Sox	7–8	Pérez (8–5)	**Bolton** (0–1)	Thigpen (17)	–	42–41	L1
84	July 9	@ White Sox	8–2 (10)	**Smith** (3–4)	Horton (4–7)		23,699	43–41	W1
85	July 10	@ White Sox	1–4	LaPoint (7–9)	**Curry** (0–1)	Thigpen (18)	15,163	43–42	L1
ASG	July 12	AL @ NL	2–1	Viola (1–0)	Gooden (0–1)	Eckersley (1)	39,071	—	N/A
—	July 14	Royals	Postponed (Rain); Makeup: July 15						
86	July 15	Royals	3–1	**Clemens** (13–5)	Saberhagen (10–8)		–	44–42	W1
87	July 15	Royals	7–4	**Smithson** (4–3)	Leibrandt (5–11)	**Smith** (12)	35,412	45–42	W2
88	July 16	Royals	7–6	**Smith** (4–4)	Farr (2–2)		34,466	46–42	W3
89	July 17	Royals	10–8	**Gardner** (3–1)	Power (4–4)		34,181	47–42	W4
90	July 18	Twins	6–5	**Lamp** (4–3)	Blyleven (7–9)	**Smith** (13)	33,397	48–42	W5
91	July 19	Twins	5–0	**Smithson** (5–3)	Anderson (6–7)		32,036	49–42	W6
92	July 20	Twins	9–7 (10)	**Bolton** (1–1)	Atherton (5–5)		35,313	50–42	W7
93	July 21	White Sox	6–1	**Boyd** (8–7)	McDowell (4–8)	**Stanley** (2)	32,049	51–42	W8
94	July 22	White Sox	4–3	**Gardner** (4–1)	John Davis (2–3)	**Smith** (14)	33,477	52–42	W9
95	July 23	White Sox	11–5	**Smithson** (6–3)	LaPoint (7–11)		35,129	53–42	W10
96	July 24	White Sox	3–2	**Hurst** (10–4)	Long (4–5)	**Smith** (15)	33,394	54–42	W11
97	July 25	@ Rangers	2–0	**Clemens** (14–5)	Hough (9–11)		34,175	55–42	W12
98	July 26	@ Rangers	8–9	McMurtry (2–0)	**Bolton** (1–2)	Williams (14)	20,456	55–43	L1
99	July 27	@ Rangers	10–7	**Stanley** (4–0)	Williams (1–4)	**Smith** (16)	17,639	56–43	W1
100	July 29	Brewers	6–4	**Hurst** (11–4)	Wegman (10–8)	**Smith** (17)	–	57–43	W2
101	July 29	Brewers	5–4	**Lamp** (5–3)	Bosio (6–13)	**Stanley** (3)	35,169	58–43	W3
102	July 30	Brewers	3–2	**Clemens** (15–5)	Higuera (7–7)		33,964	59–43	W4
103	July 31	Brewers	5–0	**Boddicker** (7–12)	August (5–5)		33,527	60–43	W5

August (13–16) (Home: 9–5; Road: 4–11)

#	Date	Opponent	Score	Win	Loss	Save	Crowd	Record	Streak
104	August 2	Rangers	7–2	**Gardner** (5–1)	Russell (8–4)		35,462	61–43	W6
105	August 3	Rangers	5–4	**Lamp** (6–3)	Witt (3–7)	**Smith** (18)	34,380	62–43	W7
106	August 4	@ Tigers	6–11	Terrell (6–8)	**Clemens** (15–6)		40,980	62–44	L1
107	August 5	@ Tigers	1–3	Morris (9–11)	**Stanley** (4–1)	Henneman (17)	–	62–45	L2
108	August 5	@ Tigers	2–3	King (2–1)	**Boddicker** (7–13)	Henneman (18)	44,334	62–46	L3
109	August 6	@ Tigers	2–4	Alexander (11–6)	**Gardner** (5–2)		44,838	62–47	L4
110	August 7	@ Tigers	3–0 (10)	**Hurst** (12–4)	Robinson (13–5)		41,623	63–47	W1
111	August 9	@ Brewers	2–3	Crim (5–5)	**Clemens** (15–7)		–	63–48	L1
112	August 9	@ Brewers	5–1	**Boddicker** (8–13)	Wegman (10–9)	**Stanley** (4)	20,816	64–48	W1
113	August 10	@ Brewers	3–8	Higuera (8–8)	**Smithson** (6–4)		19.739	64–49	L1
114	August 11	@ Brewers	0–4	August (7–5)	**Gardner** (5–3)		32,351	64–50	L2
115	August 12	Tigers	9–4	**Hurst** (13–4)	Alexander (11–7)	**Stanley** (5)	34,732	65–50	W1
116	August 13	Tigers	16–4	**Boddicker** (9–13)	Robinson (13–6)	**Bolton** (1)	33,601	66–50	W2
117	August 14	Tigers	6–18	King (3–1)	**Clemens** (15–8)		33,757	66–51	L1
118	August 16	Mariners	0–7	Bankhead (6–7)	**Gardner** (5–4)		33,924	66–52	L2
119	August 17	Mariners	7–2	**Hurst** (14–4)	Swift (6–10)		31,548	67–52	W1
120	August 18	Mariners	1–6	Langston (9–10)	**Boddicker** (9–14)		33,944	67–53	L1
121	August 19	Athletics	7–6	**Stanley** (5–1)	Stewart (15–11)		33,993	68–53	W1
122	August 20	Athletics	7–5	**Sellers** (1–6)	Burns (5–1)	**Smith** (19)	34,372	69–53	W2
123	August 21	Athletics	4–5	Honeycutt (3–2)	**Stanley** (5–2)	Eckersley (35)	33,282	69–54	L1
124	August 22	Angels	6–2	**Hurst** (15–4)	Clark (5–2)		33,828	70–54	W1
125	August 23	Angels	10–2	**Boddicker** (10–14)	Finley (7–12)		34,313	71–54	W2
126	August 24	Angels	3–4	Witt (10–12)	**Clemens** (15–9)	Harvey (13)	32,522	71–55	L1
127	August 26	@ Mariners	5–3	**Boyd** (9–7)	Bankhead (7–8)	**Smith** (20)	16,109	72–55	W1
128	August 27	@ Mariners	6–8	Wilkinson (2–2)	**Bolton** (1–3)	Schooler (10)	19,706	72–56	L1
129	August 28	@ Mariners	7–2	**Hurst** (16–4)	Moore (7–14)		17,047	73–56	W1
130	August 29	@ Athletics	1–3	Welch (15–7)	**Boddicker** (10–15)	Eckersley (36)	40,423	73–57	L1
131	August 30	@ Athletics	0–1	Stewart (16–11)	**Clemens** (15–10)		35,220	73–58	L2
132	August 31	@ Athletics	2–7	Davis (14–4)	**Smithson** (6–5)		37,151	73–59	L3

September (16–12) (Home: 8–5; Road: 8–7)

#	Date	Opponent	Score	Win	Loss	Save	Crowd	Record	Streak
133	September 1	@ Angels	4–2	**Gardner** (6–4)	Clark (6–3)	**Smith** (21)	27,771	74–59	W1
134	September 2	@ Angels	2–3	Finley (9–12)	**Hurst** (16–5)	Harvey (14)	29,325	74–60	L1
135	September 3	@ Angels	1–2	Witt (12–12)	**Lamp** (6–4)		33,376	74–61	L2
136	September 4	@ Angels	6–5 (10)	**Stanley** (6–2)	Harvey (6–5)	**Smith** (22)	30,224	75–61	W1
137	September 5	@ Orioles	4–1	**Smithson** (7–5)	Schmidt (7–4)	**Smith** (23)	19,614	76–61	W2
138	September 6	@ Orioles	6–1	**Gardner** (7–4)	Tibbs (4–13)		19,124	77–61	W3
139	September 7	@ Orioles	3–4	Thurmond (1–6)	**Stanley** (6–3)		35,569	77–62	L1
140	September 9	Indians	7–4	**Boddicker** (11–15)	Yett (8–5)	**Smith** (24)	33,349	78–62	W1
141	September 10	Indians	6–0	**Clemens** (16–10)	Black (4–4)		34,099	79–62	W2
142	September 11	Indians	2–4	Candiotti (12–8)	**Stanley** (6–4)	Jones (32)	33,154	79–63	L1
143	September 12	Orioles	6–1	**Hurst** (17–5)	Schilling (0–1)		32,619	80–63	W1
144	September 13	Orioles	6–4	**Smithson** (8–5)	Harnisch (0–1)	**Smith** (25)	32,842	81–63	W2
145	September 14	Orioles	4–3	**Boddicker** (12–15)	Bautista (6–14)	**Smith** (26)	32,745	82–63	W3
146	September 15	Yankees	3–5	Rhoden (11–10)	**Clemens** (16–11)	Righetti (22)	35,320	82–64	L1
147	September 16	Yankees	7–4	**Gardner** (8–4)	Shields (4–5)	**Smith** (27)	35,226	83–64	W1
148	September 17	Yankees	3–1	**Hurst** (18–5)	Hudson (6–6)		35,051	84–64	W2
149	September 18	Yankees	9–4	**Smithson** (9–5)	Guidry (1–3)	**Smith** (28)	35,146	85–64	W3
150	September 19	@ Blue Jays	4–5	Clancy (10–13)	**Lamp** (6–5)	Ward (14)	28,455	85–65	L1
151	September 20	@ Blue Jays	13–2	**Clemens** (17–11)	Musselman (6–5)		30,352	86–65	W1
152	September 21	@ Blue Jays	0–1	Flanagan (12–13)	**Gardner** (8–5)	Ward (15)	30,344	86–66	L1
153	September 23	@ Yankees	10–9	**Lamp** (7–5)	Mohorcic (4–8)	**Smith** (29)	51,511	87–66	W1
154	September 24	@ Yankees	4–5	Guetterman (1–1)	**Smith** (4–5)		51,392	87–67	L1
155	September 25	@ Yankees	6–0	**Clemens** (18–11)	Rhoden (12–11)		54,774	88–67	W1
156	September 26	Blue Jays	1–11	Musselman (7–5)	**Gardner** (8–6)		33,953	88–68	L1
157	September 27	Blue Jays	9–15	Flanagan (13–13)	**Smithson** (9–6)		34,442	88–69	L2
158	September 28	Blue Jays	0–1	Key (12–5)	**Hurst** (18–6)		34,873	88–70	L3
159	September 29	@ Indians	12–0	**Boddicker** (13–15)	Nichols (1–7)		5,879	89–70	W1
160	September 30	@ Indians	2–4 (Note: Though the Red Sox lost, they clinched the division title when the Milwaukee Brewers lost 7–1 to the Oakland Athletics.)	Yett (9–6)	**Clemens** (18–12)	Jones (36)	15,497	89–71	L1

October (0–2) (Home: 0–0; Road: 0–2)

#	Date	Opponent	Score	Win	Loss	Save	Crowd	Record	Streak
161	October 1	@ Indians	0–1	Farrell (14–10)	**Sellers** (1–7)	Jones (37)	14,972	89–72	L2
162	October 2	@ Indians	5–6	Candiotti (14–8)	**Lamp** (7–6)	Black (1)	10,456	89–73	L3

== Player stats ==
=== Batting ===
==== Starters by position ====
Note: Pos = Position; G = Games played; AB = At bats; H = Hits; Avg. = Batting average; HR = Home runs; RBI = Runs batted in

Pos	Player	G	AB	H	Avg.	HR	RBI
C	Rich Gedman	95	299	69	.231	9	39
1B	Todd Benzinger	120	405	103	.254	13	70
2B	Marty Barrett	150	612	173	.283	1	65
3B	Wade Boggs	155	584	214	.366	5	58
SS	Jody Reed	109	338	99	.293	1	28
LF	Mike Greenwell	158	590	192	.325	22	119
CF	Ellis Burks	144	540	159	.294	18	92
RF	Dwight Evans	149	559	164	.293	21	111
DH	Jim Rice	135	485	128	.264	15	72

==== Other batters ====
Note: G = Games played; AB = At bats; H = Hits; Avg. = Batting average; HR = Home runs; RBI = Runs batted in

Player	G	AB	H	Avg.	HR	RBI
Rick Cerone	84	264	71	.269	3	27
Spike Owen	89	257	64	.249	5	18
Larry Parrish	52	158	41	.259	7	26
Brady Anderson	41	148	34	.230	0	12
Kevin Romine	57	78	15	.192	1	6
Ed Romero	31	75	18	.240	0	5
Sam Horn	24	61	9	.148	2	8
Pat Dodson	17	45	8	.178	1	1
John Marzano	10	29	4	.138	0	1
Randy Kutcher	19	12	2	.167	0	0
Carlos Quintana	5	6	2	.333	0	2

=== Pitching ===
==== Starting pitchers ====
Note: G = Games pitched; IP = Innings pitched; W = Wins; L = Losses; ERA = Earned run average; SO = Strikeouts

Player	G	IP	W	L	ERA	SO
Roger Clemens	35	264.0	18	12	2.93	291
Bruce Hurst	33	216.2	18	6	3.66	166
Oil Can Boyd	23	129.2	9	7	5.34	71
Mike Boddicker	15	89.0	7	3	2.63	56
Steve Ellsworth	8	36.0	1	6	6.75	16
Steve Curry	3	11.0	0	1	8.18	4

==== Other pitchers ====
Note: G = Games pitched; IP = Innings pitched; W = Wins; L = Losses; ERA = Earned run average; SO = Strikeouts

Player	G	IP	W	L	ERA	SO
Wes Gardner	36	149.2	8	6	3.50	106
Mike Smithson	31	126.2	9	6	5.97	73
Jeff Sellers	18	85.2	1	7	4.83	70

==== Relief pitchers ====
Note: G = Games pitched; W = Wins; L = Losses; SV = Saves; ERA = Earned run average; SO = Strikeouts

Player	G	W	L	SV	ERA	SO
Lee Smith	64	4	5	29	2.80	96
Bob Stanley	57	6	4	5	3.19	57
Dennis Lamp	46	7	6	0	3.48	49
Tom Bolton	28	1	3	1	4.75	21
John Trautwein	9	0	1	0	9.00	8
Zach Crouch	3	0	0	0	6.75	0
Mike Rochford	2	0	0	0	0.00	1
Rob Woodward	1	0	0	0	13.50	0

== ALCS ==
=== Game 1 ===
Team	1	2	3	4	5	6	7	8	9	R	H	E
Oakland	0	0	0	1	0	0	0	1	0	2	6	0
Boston	0	0	0	0	0	0	1	0	0	1	6	0
W: Rick Honeycutt (1–0) L: Bruce Hurst (0–1) S: Dennis Eckersley (1)
HR: OAK – José Canseco (1)

=== Game 2 ===
Team	1	2	3	4	5	6	7	8	9	R	H	E
Oakland	0	0	0	0	0	0	3	0	1	4	10	1
Boston	0	0	0	0	0	2	1	0	0	3	4	1
W: Gene Nelson (1–0) L: Lee Smith (0–1) S: Dennis Eckersley (2)
HR: OAK – José Canseco (2) BOS – Rich Gedman (1)

=== Game 3 ===
Team	1	2	3	4	5	6	7	8	9	R	H	E
Boston	3	2	0	0	0	0	1	0	0	6	12	0
Oakland	0	4	2	0	1	0	1	2	X	10	15	1
W: Gene Nelson (2–0) L: Mike Boddicker (0–1) S: Dennis Eckersley (3)
HR: OAK – Mark McGwire (1) Carney Lansford (1) Ron Hassey (1) Dave Henderson (1) BOS – Mike Greenwell (1)

=== Game 4 ===
Team	1	2	3	4	5	6	7	8	9	R	H	E
Boston	0	0	0	0	0	1	0	0	0	1	4	0
Oakland	1	0	1	0	0	0	0	2	X	4	10	1
W: Dave Stewart (1–0) L: Bruce Hurst (0–2) S: Dennis Eckersley (4)
HR: OAK – José Canseco (3)

== Awards and honors ==
Awards

- Wade Boggs, Silver Slugger Award (3B)
- Roger Clemens, AL Pitcher of the Month (July)
- Mike Greenwell, Silver Slugger Award (OF), AL Player of the Month (June)
- Bruce Hurst, AL Pitcher of the Month (September)

Accomplishments

- Wade Boggs, American League Batting Champion, (.366)
- Wade Boggs, American League Leader, Runs (128)
- Wade Boggs, American League Leader, Doubles (45)
- Wade Boggs, American League Leader, Walks (125)
- Wade Boggs, Major League Baseball Leader, On-base percentage (.476)
- Roger Clemens, American League Leader, Complete Games (14)
- Roger Clemens, American League Leader, Shutouts (8)

All-Star Game

- Wade Boggs, third base, starter
- Roger Clemens, pitcher, reserve
- Mike Greenwell, outfield, reserve

== Farm system ==
The Lynchburg Red Sox replaced the Greensboro Hornets as a Class A affiliate. The Arizona League Red Sox/Mariners (a cooperative team) were added as a Rookie League affiliate.

Level	Team	League	Manager
AAA	Pawtucket Red Sox	International League	Ed Nottle
AA	New Britain Red Sox	Eastern League	Dave Holt
A	Lynchburg Red Sox	Carolina League	Dick Berardino
A	Winter Haven Red Sox	Florida State League	Doug Camilli
A-Short Season	Elmira Pioneers	New York–Penn League	Bill Limoncelli
Rookie	AZL Mariners/Red Sox	Arizona League	Mike Verdi and Myron Pines

Arizona League team affiliation shared with the Seattle Mariners
