= 1988 Cleveland Indians season =

1988 Cleveland Indians
- League: American League
- Division: East
- Ballpark: Cleveland Municipal Stadium
- City: Cleveland, Ohio
- Owners: Richard Jacobs
- General managers: Hank Peters
- Managers: Doc Edwards
- Television: WUAB; Jack Corrigan, Steve Lamar
- Radio: WWWE; Herb Score, Paul Olden

The 1988 Cleveland Indians season was the 88th season for the franchise. The team, managed by Doc Edwards, finished sixth in the American League East.

Despite its mediocre season, the team had a significant legacy in Major League Baseball in the 21st century. Twenty-five years later, five of the 30 MLB managers at the start of the 2013 season were alumni of the 1988 Indians:

- Bud Black, pitcher – San Diego Padres
- Terry Francona, first baseman/outfielder – Cleveland Indians
- John Farrell, pitcher – Boston Red Sox
- Charlie Manuel, hitting coach – Philadelphia Phillies
- Ron Washington, utility infielder – Texas Rangers

The team also had players who became MLB Broadcasters, coaches, and front office executives:

- Scott Bailes, pitcher- fill-in broadcaster for the Cleveland Indians
- Tom Candiotti, pitcher- radio color analyst for the Arizona Diamondbacks
- Rod Nichols, pitcher- former Philadelphia Phillies bullpen coach, former Iowa Cubs pitching coach
- Rick Rodriguez, pitcher- former Oakland Athletics bullpen coach, former Sacramento River Cats
- Greg Swindell, pitcher- former Arizona Diamondbacks pregame and postgame analyst. In 2011, Swindell served as the color commentator for the Little League Southwest Region tournament
- Chris Bando, catcher- former Milwaukee Brewers bench and 3rd base coach from 1996 to 1998
- Jay Bell, infielder- former Arizona Diamondbacks bench and hitting coach, former Pittsburgh Pirates hitting coach, former Cincinnati Reds bench coach
- Brook Jacoby, infielder- former Cincinnati Reds hitting coach and former Toronto Blue Jays hitting coach
- Willie Upshaw, infielder- former San Francisco Giants 1st base coach
- Joe Carter, outfielder- former Toronto Blue Jays and Chicago Cubs TV analyst
- Dave Clark, outfielder- former Pittsburgh Pirates hitting coach, former Houston Astros interim manager, 3rd base coach, and 1st base coach, and former Detroit Tigers third base coach
- Cory Snyder, outfielder- former hitting coach for the Jackson Generals, a Double-A affiliate of the Seattle Mariners
- Pat Tabler, outfielder- former Toronto Blue Jays TV color analyst
- Rod Allen, outfielder- former Arizona Diamondbacks broadcaster, former Detroit Tigers television analyst
- Dan Firova, catcher- former Washington Nationals bullpen coach
- Doug Jones, closer- former pitching coach of the Boise Hawks, the short-season A affiliate of the Colorado Rockies

== Offseason ==
- January 15, 1988: Rick Rodriguez was signed as a free agent by the Indians.
- January 19, 1988: John Moses was signed as a free agent by the Indians.
- January 19, 1988: Greg Harris was signed as a free agent by the Indians.
- February 3, 1988: Doug Piatt was signed as an amateur free agent by the Indians.
- February 9, 1988: Dan Schatzeder was signed as a free agent by the Indians.
- February 22, 1988: Chris Codiroli was signed as a free agent by the Indians.
- February 28, 1988: Terry Francona was signed as a free agent by the Indians.
- March 17, 1988: Mark Huismann was released by the Indians.
- March 24, 1988: Greg Harris was released by the Indians.
- March 25, 1988: Willie Upshaw was purchased by the Indians from the Toronto Blue Jays.
- March 29, 1988: John Moses was released by the Indians.

== Regular season ==
=== Season standings ===
AL East
| Team | W | L | Pct. | GB | Home | Road |
|---|---|---|---|---|---|---|
| Boston Red Sox | 89 | 73 | .549 | — | 53‍–‍28 | 36‍–‍45 |
| Detroit Tigers | 88 | 74 | .543 | 1 | 50‍–‍31 | 38‍–‍43 |
| Milwaukee Brewers | 87 | 75 | .537 | 2 | 47‍–‍34 | 40‍–‍41 |
| Toronto Blue Jays | 87 | 75 | .537 | 2 | 45‍–‍36 | 42‍–‍39 |
| New York Yankees | 85 | 76 | .528 | 3½ | 46‍–‍34 | 39‍–‍42 |
| Cleveland Indians | 78 | 84 | .481 | 11 | 44‍–‍37 | 34‍–‍47 |
| Baltimore Orioles | 54 | 107 | .335 | 34½ | 34‍–‍46 | 20‍–‍61 |

=== Record vs. opponents ===
1988 American League record Sources:
| Team | BAL | BOS | CAL | CWS | CLE | DET | KC | MIL | MIN | NYY | OAK | SEA | TEX | TOR |
|---|---|---|---|---|---|---|---|---|---|---|---|---|---|---|
| Baltimore | — | 4–9 | 5–7 | 4–7 | 4–9 | 5–8 | 0–12 | 4–9 | 3–9 | 3–10 | 4–8 | 7–5 | 6–6 | 5–8 |
| Boston | 9–4 | — | 8–4 | 7–5 | 8–5 | 6–7 | 6–6 | 10–3 | 7–5 | 9–4 | 3–9 | 6–6 | 8–4 | 2–11 |
| California | 7–5 | 4–8 | — | 9–4 | 8–4 | 5–7 | 5–8 | 3–9 | 4–9 | 6–6 | 4–9 | 6–7 | 8–5 | 6–6 |
| Chicago | 7–4 | 5–7 | 4–9 | — | 3–9 | 3–9 | 7–6 | 6–6 | 4–9 | 3–9 | 5–8 | 9–4 | 8–5 | 7–5 |
| Cleveland | 9–4 | 5–8 | 4–8 | 9–3 | — | 4–9 | 6–6 | 9–4 | 5–7 | 6–7 | 4–8 | 5–7 | 6–6 | 6–7 |
| Detroit | 8–5 | 7–6 | 7–5 | 9–3 | 9–4 | — | 8–4 | 5–8 | 1–11 | 8–5 | 4–8 | 9–3 | 8–4 | 5–8 |
| Kansas City | 12–0 | 6–6 | 8–5 | 6–7 | 6–6 | 4–8 | — | 3–9 | 7–6 | 6–6 | 8–5 | 7–5 | 7–6 | 4–8 |
| Milwaukee | 9–4 | 3–10 | 9–3 | 6–6 | 4–9 | 8–5 | 9–3 | — | 7–5 | 6–7 | 3–9 | 8–4 | 8–4 | 7–6 |
| Minnesota | 9–3 | 5–7 | 9–4 | 9–4 | 7–5 | 11–1 | 6–7 | 5–7 | — | 3–9 | 5–8 | 8–5 | 7–6 | 7–5 |
| New York | 10–3 | 4–9 | 6–6 | 9–3 | 7–6 | 5–8 | 6–6 | 7–6 | 9–3 | — | 6–6 | 5–7 | 5–6 | 6–7 |
| Oakland | 8–4 | 9–3 | 9–4 | 8–5 | 8–4 | 8–4 | 5–8 | 9–3 | 8–5 | 6–6 | — | 9–4 | 8–5 | 9–3 |
| Seattle | 5–7 | 6–6 | 7–6 | 4–9 | 7–5 | 3–9 | 5–7 | 4–8 | 5–8 | 7–5 | 4–9 | — | 6–7 | 5–7 |
| Texas | 6–6 | 4–8 | 5–8 | 5–8 | 6–6 | 4–8 | 6–7 | 4–8 | 6–7 | 6–5 | 5–8 | 7–6 | — | 6–6 |
| Toronto | 8–5 | 11–2 | 6–6 | 5–7 | 7–6 | 8–5 | 8–4 | 6–7 | 5–7 | 7–6 | 3–9 | 7–5 | 6–6 | — |

=== Notable transactions ===
- May 11, 1988: Dan Firova was signed as a free agent by the Indians.
- June 2, 1988: Houston Jiménez was signed as a free agent by the Indians.
- June 3, 1988: Pat Tabler was traded by the Indians to the Kansas City Royals for Bud Black.
- June 22, 1988: Dan Schatzeder was released by the Cleveland Indians.
- September 6, 1988: Chris Codiroli was released by the Indians.

=== Opening Day Lineup ===
Opening Day Starters
| # | Name | Position |
|---|---|---|
| 14 | Julio Franco | 2B |
| 20 | Willie Upshaw | 1B |
| 10 | Pat Tabler | DH |
| 30 | Joe Carter | CF |
| 27 | Mel Hall | LF |
| 26 | Brook Jacoby | 3B |
| 28 | Cory Snyder | RF |
| 16 | Jay Bell | SS |
| 6 | Andy Allanson | C |
| 49 | Tom Candiotti | P |

=== Roster ===
1988 Cleveland Indians
Roster
| Pitchers: 43 Scott Bailes; 40 Bud Black; 49 Tom Candiotti; 37 Chris Codiroli; 50 Jeff Dedmon; 52 John Farrell; 39 Don Gordon; 22 Brad Havens; 11 Doug Jones; 47 Jeff Kaiser; 17 Bill Laskey; 57 Rod Nichols; 44 Jon Perlman; 36,12 Rick Rodriguez; 31 Dan Schatzeder; 21 Greg Swindell; 75 Mike Walker; 42 Rich Yett | Catchers: 6 Andy Allanson; 23 Chris Bando; 31 Dan Firova; 17 Tom Lampkin; 18 Ron Tingley; Infielders: 16 Jay Bell; 14 Julio Franco; 24 Terry Francona; 26 Brook Jacoby; 4 Houston Jiménez; 69 Luis Medina; 4 Domingo Ramos; 20 Willie Upshaw; 15 Ron Washington; 34 Eddie Williams; 10 Paul Zuvella | Outfielders: 30 Joe Carter; 8 Carmen Castillo; 25 Dave Clark; 27 Mel Hall; 68 Scott Jordan; 28 Cory Snyder; 10 Pat Tabler; 36 Reggie Williams; Other batters: 60 Rod Allen; 33 Ron Kittle | Manager: 32 Doc Edwards; Coaches: 45 Johnny Goryl (Third Base); 7 Luis Isaac (Bullpen); 9 Charlie Manuel (Hitting); 2 Tom Spencer (First Base); 35 Mark Wiley (Pitching) |

== Statistics ==
=== Batting ===
Note: G = Games played; AB = At bats; R = Runs scored; H = Hits; 2B = Doubles; 3B = Triples; HR = Home runs; RBI = Runs batted in; AVG = Batting average; SB = Stolen bases

| Player | G | AB | R | H | 2B | 3B | HR | RBI | AVG | SB |
|---|---|---|---|---|---|---|---|---|---|---|
| Andy Allanson | 133 | 434 | 44 | 114 | 11 | 0 | 5 | 50 | .263 | 5 |
| Rod Allen | 5 | 11 | 1 | 1 | 1 | 0 | 0 | 0 | .091 | 0 |
| Chris Bando | 32 | 72 | 6 | 9 | 1 | 0 | 1 | 8 | .125 | 0 |
| Jay Bell | 73 | 211 | 23 | 46 | 5 | 1 | 2 | 21 | .218 | 4 |
| Joe Carter | 157 | 621 | 85 | 168 | 36 | 6 | 27 | 98 | .271 | 27 |
| Carmelo Castillo | 66 | 176 | 12 | 48 | 8 | 0 | 4 | 14 | .273 | 6 |
| Dave Clark | 63 | 156 | 11 | 41 | 4 | 1 | 3 | 18 | .263 | 0 |
| Dan Firova | 1 | 0 | 0 | 0 | 0 | 0 | 0 | 0 | — | 0 |
| Julio Franco | 152 | 613 | 88 | 186 | 23 | 6 | 10 | 54 | .303 | 25 |
| Terry Francona | 62 | 212 | 24 | 66 | 8 | 0 | 1 | 12 | .311 | 0 |
| Mel Hall | 150 | 515 | 69 | 144 | 32 | 4 | 6 | 71 | .280 | 7 |
| Brook Jacoby | 152 | 552 | 59 | 133 | 25 | 0 | 9 | 49 | .241 | 2 |
| Houston Jimenez | 9 | 21 | 1 | 1 | 0 | 0 | 0 | 1 | .048 | 0 |
| Scott Jordan | 7 | 9 | 0 | 1 | 0 | 0 | 0 | 1 | .111 | 0 |
| Ron Kittle | 75 | 225 | 31 | 58 | 8 | 0 | 18 | 43 | .258 | 0 |
| Tom Lampkin | 4 | 4 | 0 | 0 | 0 | 0 | 0 | 0 | .000 | 0 |
| Luis Medina | 16 | 51 | 10 | 13 | 0 | 0 | 6 | 8 | .255 | 0 |
| Domingo Ramos | 22 | 46 | 7 | 12 | 1 | 0 | 0 | 5 | .261 | 0 |
| Cory Snyder | 142 | 511 | 71 | 139 | 24 | 3 | 26 | 75 | .272 | 5 |
| Pat Tabler | 41 | 143 | 16 | 32 | 5 | 1 | 1 | 17 | .224 | 1 |
| Ron Tingley | 9 | 24 | 1 | 4 | 0 | 0 | 1 | 2 | .167 | 0 |
| Willie Upshaw | 149 | 493 | 58 | 121 | 22 | 3 | 11 | 50 | .245 | 12 |
| Ron Washington | 69 | 223 | 30 | 57 | 14 | 2 | 2 | 21 | .256 | 3 |
| Eddie Williams | 10 | 21 | 3 | 4 | 0 | 0 | 0 | 1 | .190 | 0 |
| Reggie Williams | 11 | 31 | 7 | 7 | 2 | 0 | 1 | 3 | .226 | 0 |
| Paul Zuvella | 51 | 130 | 9 | 30 | 5 | 1 | 0 | 7 | .231 | 0 |
| Team totals | 162 | 5505 | 666 | 1435 | 235 | 28 | 134 | 629 | .261 | 97 |

=== Pitching ===
Note: W = Wins; L = Losses; ERA = Earned run average; G = Games pitched; GS = Games started; SV = Saves; IP = Innings pitched; H = Hits allowed; R = Runs allowed; ER = Earned runs allowed; BB = Walks allowed; K = Strikeouts

| Player | W | L | ERA | G | GS | SV | IP | H | R | ER | BB | K |
|---|---|---|---|---|---|---|---|---|---|---|---|---|
| Scott Bailes | 9 | 14 | 4.90 | 37 | 21 | 0 | 145.0 | 149 | 89 | 79 | 46 | 53 |
| Bud Black | 2 | 3 | 5.03 | 16 | 7 | 1 | 59.0 | 59 | 35 | 33 | 23 | 44 |
| Tom Candiotti | 14 | 8 | 3.28 | 31 | 31 | 0 | 216.2 | 225 | 86 | 79 | 53 | 137 |
| Chris Codiroli | 0 | 4 | 9.31 | 14 | 2 | 1 | 19.1 | 32 | 22 | 20 | 10 | 12 |
| Jeff Dedmon | 1 | 0 | 4.54 | 21 | 0 | 1 | 33.2 | 35 | 20 | 17 | 21 | 17 |
| John Farrell | 14 | 10 | 4.24 | 31 | 30 | 0 | 210.1 | 216 | 106 | 99 | 67 | 92 |
| Don Gordon | 3 | 4 | 4.40 | 38 | 0 | 1 | 59.1 | 65 | 33 | 29 | 19 | 20 |
| Brad Havens | 2 | 3 | 3.14 | 28 | 0 | 1 | 57.1 | 62 | 22 | 20 | 17 | 30 |
| Doug Jones | 3 | 4 | 2.27 | 51 | 0 | 37 | 83.1 | 69 | 26 | 21 | 16 | 72 |
| Jeff Kaiser | 0 | 0 | 0.00 | 3 | 0 | 0 | 2.2 | 2 | 0 | 0 | 1 | 0 |
| Bill Laskey | 1 | 0 | 5.18 | 17 | 0 | 1 | 24.1 | 32 | 16 | 14 | 6 | 17 |
| Rod Nichols | 1 | 7 | 5.06 | 11 | 10 | 0 | 69.1 | 73 | 41 | 39 | 23 | 31 |
| Jon Perlman | 0 | 2 | 5.49 | 10 | 0 | 0 | 19.2 | 25 | 12 | 12 | 11 | 10 |
| Rick Rodriguez | 1 | 2 | 7.09 | 10 | 5 | 0 | 33.0 | 43 | 28 | 26 | 17 | 9 |
| Dan Schatzeder | 0 | 2 | 9.56 | 15 | 0 | 3 | 16.0 | 26 | 19 | 17 | 2 | 10 |
| Greg Swindell | 18 | 14 | 3.20 | 33 | 33 | 0 | 242.0 | 234 | 97 | 86 | 45 | 180 |
| Mike Walker | 0 | 1 | 7.27 | 3 | 1 | 0 | 8.2 | 8 | 7 | 7 | 10 | 7 |
| Rich Yett | 9 | 6 | 4.62 | 23 | 22 | 0 | 134.1 | 146 | 72 | 69 | 55 | 71 |
| Team totals | 78 | 84 | 4.16 | 162 | 162 | 46 | 1434.0 | 1501 | 731 | 663 | 442 | 812 |

== Awards and honors ==
All-Star Game

== Farm system ==
| Level | Team | League | Manager |
|---|---|---|---|
| AAA | Colorado Springs Sky Sox | Pacific Coast League | Steve Swisher |
| AA | Williamsport Bills | Eastern League | Mike Hargrove |
| A | Kinston Indians | Carolina League | Glenn Adams |
| A | Waterloo Indians | Midwest League | Ken Bolek |
| Rookie | Burlington Indians | Appalachian League | Mike Bucci |
| Rookie | GCL Indians | Gulf Coast League | Billy Williams |

LEAGUE CHAMPIONS: Kinston
