= 1988 Baltimore Orioles season =

Major League Baseball season

1988 Baltimore Orioles
- League: American League
- Division: East
- Ballpark: Memorial Stadium
- City: Baltimore, Maryland
- Record: 54–107 (.335)
- Divisional place: 7th
- Owners: Edward Bennett Williams
- General managers: Roland Hemond
- Managers: Cal Ripken Sr., Frank Robinson
- Television: WMAR-TV (Jim Simpson, Brooks Robinson); Home Team Sports (Jim Palmer, Mel Proctor, John Lowenstein)
- Radio: WBAL (AM) (Jon Miller, Joe Angel)

The 1988 Baltimore Orioles season was the 88th season in Baltimore Orioles franchise history, the 35th in Baltimore, and the 35th at Memorial Stadium. The Orioles had the worst start to a season in modern American baseball history. The Orioles finished seventh in the American League East, reduced to a record of 54 wins and 107 losses just five seasons after winning the World Series. The season is most notable for the 0–21 start that lasted from April 4 to April 28. Manager Cal Ripken Sr. was fired after an 0–6 start and replaced by Hall of Famer Frank Robinson. The Orioles won their first game of the year against the Chicago White Sox at Comiskey Park on April 29. The most runs allowed during the season was 15 in a game on June 19 while the most runs scored was 12 in a game on May 31. Orioles owner Edward Bennett Williams died in August of that year.

This was only the second time that the Orioles had lost at least 100 games since their move to Baltimore (the other 1954); in addition, the 107 losses would not be surpassed until 30 years later. It was the team's fifth-worst overall franchise record, behind only 1939 (43–111), 2018 (47–115), 2021 (52–110) and 2019 (54–108). The next year the Orioles switched back to the full bodied bird logo (which had been previously featured on the caps for the team's first 12 years from 1954 to 1965), the cartoon bird logo wouldn't return to the caps until 2012.

The Orioles’ 21-game losing streak would not be matched as the American League's longest losing streak until 2024, when the Chicago White Sox matched it.

== Offseason ==
- October 8, 1987: Mike Kinnunen was released by the Orioles.
- October 8, 1987: Mike Hart was released by the Orioles.
- November 6, 1987: Rico Rossy and Terry Crowley Jr. (minors) were traded by the Orioles to the Pittsburgh Pirates for Joe Orsulak.
- February 27, 1988: Ray Knight was traded by the Orioles to the Detroit Tigers for Mark Thurmond.
- March 21, 1988: Mike Young and a player to be named later were traded by the Orioles to the Philadelphia Phillies for Rick Schu, Keith Hughes and Jeff Stone. The Orioles completed the deal by sending Frank Bellino (minors) to the Phillies on June 14.

== Regular season ==
- April 4, 1988: The Milwaukee Brewers defeated the Orioles 12–0, setting a record for the largest margin of victory in a shutout win on Opening Day.
- September 7, 1988: Curt Schilling made his major league debut. He pitched against the Boston Red Sox and pitched in 7 innings. Schilling gave up 6 hits and 3 earned runs. He had 2 strikeouts and 5 bases on balls.

=== The losing streak ===
- Game 13: The Orioles tied the 1904 Washington Senators and the 1920 Detroit Tigers for most losses to start the season with 13 losses when they lost to the Brewers 9–5 in Milwaukee.
- Game 14: On a cold, wet night, 7,284 witnessed baseball history at Milwaukee's County Stadium. Baltimore became the first team in MLB history to start the season 0–14 as the Brewers won, 8–6. No MLB team would lose this many games in a row to open a season until the 1997 Chicago Cubs did so.
- Game 21: The Orioles lost 4–2 to the Minnesota Twins in Minnesota, extending their streak of season-starting losses to half again their original record, marking their seventh straight series being swept, and ending the day 16 games out of first place on April 28.

=== Season standings ===
AL East
Team	W	L	Pct.	GB	Home	Road
Boston Red Sox	89	73	.549	—	53‍–‍28	36‍–‍45
Detroit Tigers	88	74	.543	1	50‍–‍31	38‍–‍43
Milwaukee Brewers	87	75	.537	2	47‍–‍34	40‍–‍41
Toronto Blue Jays	87	75	.537	2	45‍–‍36	42‍–‍39
New York Yankees	85	76	.528	3½	46‍–‍34	39‍–‍42
Cleveland Indians	78	84	.481	11	44‍–‍37	34‍–‍47
Baltimore Orioles	54	107	.335	34½	34‍–‍46	20‍–‍61

=== Record vs. opponents ===
1988 American League record Sources:
Team	BAL	BOS	CAL	CWS	CLE	DET	KC	MIL	MIN	NYY	OAK	SEA	TEX	TOR
Baltimore	—	4–9	5–7	4–7	4–9	5–8	0–12	4–9	3–9	3–10	4–8	7–5	6–6	5–8
Boston	9–4	—	8–4	7–5	8–5	6–7	6–6	10–3	7–5	9–4	3–9	6–6	8–4	2–11
California	7–5	4–8	—	9–4	8–4	5–7	5–8	3–9	4–9	6–6	4–9	6–7	8–5	6–6
Chicago	7–4	5–7	4–9	—	3–9	3–9	7–6	6–6	4–9	3–9	5–8	9–4	8–5	7–5
Cleveland	9–4	5–8	4–8	9–3	—	4–9	6–6	9–4	5–7	6–7	4–8	5–7	6–6	6–7
Detroit	8–5	7–6	7–5	9–3	9–4	—	8–4	5–8	1–11	8–5	4–8	9–3	8–4	5–8
Kansas City	12–0	6–6	8–5	6–7	6–6	4–8	—	3–9	7–6	6–6	8–5	7–5	7–6	4–8
Milwaukee	9–4	3–10	9–3	6–6	4–9	8–5	9–3	—	7–5	6–7	3–9	8–4	8–4	7–6
Minnesota	9–3	5–7	9–4	9–4	7–5	11–1	6–7	5–7	—	3–9	5–8	8–5	7–6	7–5
New York	10–3	4–9	6–6	9–3	7–6	5–8	6–6	7–6	9–3	—	6–6	5–7	5–6	6–7
Oakland	8–4	9–3	9–4	8–5	8–4	8–4	5–8	9–3	8–5	6–6	—	9–4	8–5	9–3
Seattle	5–7	6–6	7–6	4–9	7–5	3–9	5–7	4–8	5–8	7–5	4–9	—	6–7	5–7
Texas	6–6	4–8	5–8	5–8	6–6	4–8	6–7	4–8	6–7	6–5	5–8	7–6	—	6–6
Toronto	8–5	11–2	6–6	5–7	7–6	8–5	8–4	6–7	5–7	7–6	3–9	7–5	6–6	—

=== Opening Day starters ===
- Mike Boddicker
- Terry Kennedy
- Fred Lynn
- Eddie Murray
- Joe Orsulak
- Billy Ripken
- Cal Ripken Jr.
- Rick Schu
- Larry Sheets
- Jeff Stone

=== Notable transactions ===
- April 2, 1988: Dickie Noles was signed as a free agent with the Orioles.
- April 5, 1988: Mickey Tettleton was signed as a free agent by the Orioles.
- June 1, 1988: Pete Rose Jr. was drafted by the Orioles in the 12th round of the 1988 Major League Baseball draft. Player signed September 1, 1988.
- July 29, 1988: Mike Boddicker was traded by the Orioles to the Boston Red Sox for Brady Anderson and Curt Schilling.

== Roster ==
1988 Baltimore Orioles roster
Roster
Pitchers: 41 Don Aase; 29,34 Jeff Ballard; 48 José Bautista; 52 Mike Boddicker; 43 Gordon Dillard; 27 John Habyan; 42 Pete Harnisch; 16 Scott McGregor; 52 Bob Milacki; 12 Mike Morgan; 49 Tom Niedenfuer; 37 Dickie Noles; 30 Gregg Olson; 23 Oswaldo Peraza; 37 Bill Scherrer; 43 Curt Schilling; 24 Dave Schmidt; 39 Doug Sisk; 21 Mark Thurmond; 53 Jay Tibbs; 32 Mark Williamson	Catchers: 15 Terry Kennedy; 26 Carl Nichols; 14 Mickey Tettleton; Infielders: 88 Rene Gonzales; 33 Eddie Murray; 3,7 Billy Ripken; 8 Cal Ripken Jr.; 11 Wade Rowdon; 13,25 Rick Schu; 28 Jim Traber; 3 Craig Worthington	Outfielders: 16 Brady Anderson; 25 Butch Davis; 9 Jim Dwyer; 38 Ken Gerhart; 35 Keith Hughes; 30 Tito Landrum; 19 Fred Lynn; 6 Joe Orsulak; 18,19 Larry Sheets; 17 Pete Stanicek; 1 Jeff Stone	Manager: 7 Cal Ripken Sr.; 20 Frank Robinson; Coaches: 2 Don Buford (Bench); 10 Terry Crowley (Hitting); 47 John Hart (Third Base); 44 Elrod Hendricks (Bullpen); 40 Minnie Mendoza (First Base); 31 Herm Starrette (Pitching)

== Player stats ==
= Indicates team leader

=== Batting ===
==== Starters by position ====
Note: Pos = Position; G = Games played; AB = At bats; H = Hits; HR = Home runs; RBI = Runs batted in; Avg. = Batting average

Pos	Player	G	AB	H	HR	RBI	Avg.
C	Mickey Tettleton	86	283	74	11	37	.261
1B	Eddie Murray	161	603	171	28	84	.284
2B	Billy Ripken	150	512	103	2	34	.207
3B	Rick Schu	89	270	69	4	20	.256
SS	Cal Ripken Jr.	161	575	152	23	81	.264
LF	Pete Stanicek	83	261	60	4	17	.230
CF	Fred Lynn	87	301	76	18	37	.252
RF	Joe Orsulak	125	379	109	8	27	.288
DH	Larry Sheets	136	452	104	10	47	.230

==== Other batters ====
Note: G = Games played; AB = At bats; H = Hits; HR = Home runs; RBI = Runs batted in; Avg. = Batting average

Player	G	AB	H	HR	RBI	Avg.
Jim Traber	103	352	78	10	45	.222
Terry Kennedy	85	265	60	3	16	.226
Ken Gerhart	103	262	51	9	23	.195
Rene Gonzales	92	237	51	2	15	.215
Brady Anderson	53	177	35	1	9	.198
Keith Hughes	41	108	21	2	14	.194
Craig Worthington	26	81	15	2	4	.185
Jeff Stone	26	61	10	0	1	.164
Jim Dwyer	35	53	12	0	3	.226
Carl Nichols	18	47	9	0	1	.191
Wade Rowdon	20	30	3	0	0	.100
Butch Davis	13	25	6	0	0	.240
Tito Landrum	13	24	3	0	2	.125

=== Pitching ===
==== Starting pitchers ====
Note: G = Games pitched; IP = Innings pitched; W = Wins; L = Losses; ERA = Earned run average; SO = Strikeouts

Player	G	IP	W	L	ERA	SO
José Bautista	33	171.2	6	15	4.30	76
Jay Tibbs	30	158.2	4	15	5.39	82
Jeff Ballard	25	153.1	8	12	4.40	41
Mike Boddicker	21	147.0	6	12	3.86	100
Oswaldo Peraza	19	86.0	5	7	5.55	61
Bob Milacki	3	25.0	2	0	0.72	18
Scott McGregor	4	17.1	0	3	8.83	10
Curt Schilling	4	14.2	0	3	9.82	4
Pete Harnisch	2	13.0	0	2	5.54	10
Dickie Noles	2	3.1	0	2	24.30	1

==== Other pitchers ====
Note: G = Games pitched; IP = Innings pitched; W = Wins; L = Losses; ERA = Earned run average; SO = Strikeouts

Player	G	IP	W	L	ERA	SO
Dave Schmidt	41	129.2	8	5	3.40	67
Mark Williamson	37	117.2	5	8	4.90	69
Mike Morgan	22	71.1	1	6	5.43	29
Gordon Dillard	2	3.0	0	0	6.00	2

==== Relief pitchers ====
Note: G = Games pitched; IP = Innings pitched; W = Wins; L = Losses; SV = Saves; ERA = Earned run average; SO = Strikeouts

Player	G	IP	W	L	SV	ERA	SO
Tom Niedenfuer	52	59.0	3	4	18	3.51	40
Doug Sisk	52	94.1	3	3	0	3.72	26
Mark Thurmond	43	74.2	1	8	3	4.58	29
Don Aase	35	46.2	0	0	0	4.05	28
John Habyan	7	14.2	1	0	0	4.30	4
Gregg Olson	10	11.0	1	1	0	3.27	9
Bill Scherrer	4	4.0	0	1	0	13.50	3

== Farm system ==
Level	Team	League	Manager
AAA	Rochester Red Wings	International League	Johnny Oates
AA	Charlotte Knights	Southern League	Greg Biagini
A	Hagerstown Suns	Carolina League	Mike Hart
A-Short Season	Erie Orioles	New York–Penn League	Bobby Tolan
Rookie	Bluefield Orioles	Appalachian League	Glenn Gulliver
