= Stephen Curry (disambiguation) =

Stephen Curry (born 1988) is an American professional basketball player.

Stephen Curry may also refer to:

- Stephen Curry (comedian) (born 1976), Australian comedian and actor
- Steve Curry (born 1965), American baseball player

== See also ==
- Steve Currie (1947–1981), British bass player
- Stephen Corry (born 1951), British indigenous rights activist
