= 1988 American League Championship Series =

1988 Major League Baseball playoff series

Team (Wins)	Managers	Season
Oakland Athletics (4)	Tony La Russa	104–58, .642, GA: 13
Boston Red Sox (0)	Joe Morgan	89–73, .549, GA: 1
- Dates: October 5–9
- MVP: Dennis Eckersley (Oakland)
- Umpires: Don Denkinger (crew chief); Ted Hendry; Tim McClelland; Greg Kosc; Ken Kaiser; John Shulock

Broadcast
- Television: ABC
- TV announcers: Gary Bender, Joe Morgan and Reggie Jackson
- Radio: CBS
- Radio announcers: Dick Stockton and Johnny Bench

The 1988 American League Championship Series was a best-of-seven semifinal series in Major League Baseball’s 1988 postseason that pitted the East Division champion Boston Red Sox against the West Division champion Oakland Athletics. It was the second meeting between the two in ALCS play. The Athletics swept the Series four games to none and lost to the Los Angeles Dodgers in the 1988 World Series.

== Summary ==
=== Boston Red Sox vs. Oakland Athletics ===
Oakland won the series, 4–0.

Game	Date	Score	Location	Time	Attendance
1	October 5	Oakland Athletics – 2, Boston Red Sox – 1	Fenway Park	2:55	34,104
2	October 6	Oakland Athletics – 4, Boston Red Sox – 3	Fenway Park	3:14	34,605
3	October 8	Boston Red Sox – 6, Oakland Athletics – 10	Oakland-Alameda County Coliseum	3:14	49,261
4	October 9	Boston Red Sox – 1, Oakland Athletics – 4	Oakland-Alameda County Coliseum	2:55	49,406

== Game summaries ==
=== Game 1 ===
Wednesday, October 5, 1988, at Fenway Park in Boston, Massachusetts

Team	1	2	3	4	5	6	7	8	9	R	H	E
Oakland	0	0	0	1	0	0	0	1	0	2	6	0
Boston	0	0	0	0	0	0	1	0	0	1	6	0
WP: Rick Honeycutt (1–0) LP: Bruce Hurst (0–1) Sv: Dennis Eckersley (1); Home runs: OAK: José Canseco (1); BOS: None

In an interview conducted before Game 1, José Canseco denied reports in that day's Washington Post by baseball reporter Thomas Boswell that he had used steroids. Canseco was supported in this denial by former slugger Reggie Jackson.

The opening game, in Fenway Park, pitted Bruce Hurst against Oakland's newfound ace, Dave Stewart. The game was scoreless until the fourth when Canseco, coming off the first 40–40 season in major league history, drilled a homer to give the A's a 1-0 lead. It stayed that way until the seventh. In the bottom of the seventh, Jim Rice walked and gave way to pinch-runner Kevin Romine. Jody Reed reached when Stewart hit him with a pitch. A single by Rich Gedman loaded the bases with one out and Stewart gave way to reliever Rick Honeycutt. Honeycutt induced a line out to left field by Wade Boggs that plated Romine and tied the game, 1-1. Marty Barrett grounded out and the game remained tied after seven innings.

A Carney Lansford double and a Dave Henderson single gave the A's a 2–1 lead, and Dennis Eckersley held on for the save as the A's prevailed. Hurst went the distance allowing only six hits and two runs but wound up with the loss, while Honeycutt got the win.

The victory gave the A's a 1–0 series lead.

=== Game 2 ===
Thursday, October 6, 1988, at Fenway Park in Boston, Massachusetts

Team	1	2	3	4	5	6	7	8	9	R	H	E
Oakland	0	0	0	0	0	0	3	0	1	4	10	1
Boston	0	0	0	0	0	2	1	0	0	3	4	1
WP: Gene Nelson (1–0) LP: Lee Smith (0–1) Sv: Dennis Eckersley (2); Home runs: OAK: José Canseco (2); BOS: Rich Gedman (1)

Game 2 saw Storm Davis take the mound against Roger Clemens. After five innings, the A's had two hits, the Red Sox one, and the game was still scoreless. In the bottom of the sixth, a sequence of errors gave the Red Sox two unearned runs. With two outs, Dwight Evans and Mike Greenwell walked. With two on and two out, Davis appeared out of the inning, but an error by Dave Henderson allowed Evans to score the first run of the game. Ellis Burks then singled home Greenwell to make it 2–0 Boston. Davis then threw a wild pitch that moved Burks to second but retired the side on a strikeout of Todd Benzinger.

Trailing for the first time in the series, the A's deficit only lasted two batters. Henderson singled and José Canseco hit his second home run in two games to tie the score at two. Dave Parker singled but was forced at second by Lansford. Lansford got to go to second when Clemens balked and to third on a wild pitch. Lansford then scored on Mark McGwire's single to give the A's a 3–2 lead.

Boston tied the game in the bottom of the seventh when Rich Gedman hit a home run off Oakland reliever Greg Cadaret. Three ninth-inning singles by Ron Hassey, Tony Phillips, and Walt Weiss scored Hassey with what proved to be the winning run. Eckersley retired the side again in the ninth for his second save and Oakland carried a two games to none lead with them back to California.

Gene Nelson got the win while Boston reliever Lee Smith was the losing pitcher.

=== Game 3 ===
Saturday, October 8, 1988, at Oakland-Alameda County Coliseum in Oakland, California

Team	1	2	3	4	5	6	7	8	9	R	H	E
Boston	3	2	0	0	0	0	1	0	0	6	12	0
Oakland	0	4	2	0	1	0	1	2	X	10	15	1
WP: Gene Nelson (2–0) LP: Mike Boddicker (0–1) Sv: Dennis Eckersley (3); Home runs: BOS: Mike Greenwell (1); OAK: Mark McGwire (1), Carney Lansford (1), Ron Hassey (1), Dave Henderson (1)

After two calm games in Boston, Game 3 saw both teams mount an offense and go wild, scoring 11 runs in the first three innings (the first two games combined saw only 11 runs scored in 18 total innings). Game 3 saw two former post-season heroes square off against one another as Oakland threw Bob Welch, famous for striking out Reggie Jackson to end Game 2 of the 1978 World Series, and Boston turned to Mike Boddicker, the Orioles' post-season hero of 1983. Neither pitcher lasted the first three innings.

The Red Sox began quickly in the first. Ellis Burks singled and went to second on a balk. He reached third when Marty Barrett singled. A Wade Boggs single scored Burks and put Barrett at second. Mike Greenwell then doubled both home, and the Red Sox had a 3–0 lead after only four batters. After a ground out by Jim Rice, Welch promptly loaded the bases with walks to Evans and Gedman. With the bases loaded and only one out, Welch induced short outfield pop flies by Reed and Benzinger to get out of the first trailing only 3–0.

The Red Sox had batted through in the first, so Burks led off the second with a double. Barrett bunted Burks to third, and Burks scored on a sacrifice fly to left by Boggs. Mike Greenwell, who had doubled home two runs in the first, hit a home run to make the score 5–0 and send Welch to the showers. Gene Nelson came on in relief and got Rice to stop the deficit at 5–0.

In the bottom of the second, the A's came back. Mark McGwire led off with a home run. Consecutive fielder's choice grounders put Mike Gallego at first with two outs. Walt Weiss doubled and Carney Lansford homered, and the score after two was Red Sox 5, A's 4.

With two outs in the third, the A's took the lead. Mark McGwire singled, and Ron Hassey drilled a two-run homer to put the A's in front, 6–5. Boddicker left and Wes Gardner came in to relieve.

In the fifth, a McGwire single and Hassey double scored McGwire to make the score, 7–5. In the seventh, Boggs hit a single and went to second on Henderson's error. Boggs then scored on a single by Dwight Evans to make it 7–6. A Dave Parker double and a Stan Javier single made it 8–6. In the bottom of the eighth, a Lansford single and a Dave Henderson home run closed out the scoring as the A's prevailed, 10–6, to take a three games to none lead in the best-of-seven series.

Gene Nelson got his second win in two games while Eckersley got his third save. Boddicker got the loss.

=== Game 4 ===
Sunday, October 9, 1988, at Oakland-Alameda County Coliseum in Oakland, California

Team	1	2	3	4	5	6	7	8	9	R	H	E
Boston	0	0	0	0	0	1	0	0	0	1	4	0
Oakland	1	0	1	0	0	0	0	2	X	4	10	1
WP: Dave Stewart (1–0) LP: Bruce Hurst (0–2) Sv: Dennis Eckersley (4); Home runs: BOS: None; OAK: José Canseco (3)

The Oakland Athletics completed a four-game sweep against the Boston Red Sox to make their first World Series appearance since 1974. They faced the Los Angeles Dodgers who coincidentally were their opponent in that 1974 World Series.

Game 4 was a rematch of Game 1 as Bruce Hurst squared off against Dave Stewart. José Canseco drilled his third home run in the bottom of the first to give the A's a 1–0 lead. In the third, two singles by Weiss and Lansford followed by a Dave Henderson double made it 2–0 A's. In the top of the sixth, the Red Sox cut the lead in half when Marty Barrett walked, went to second on a single, and scored on consecutive fielder's choice ground outs.

Needing two runs to win, the Red Sox took the field with one series of at-bats left in the bottom of the eighth. Lee Smith, ineffective in Game 2, was again ineffective as the A's pushed across two insurance runs. Canseco singled, stole second, and came home on a McGwire single. Stan Javier bunted to move McGwire to second and wound up on first due to poor execution by the Red Sox. A walk to Luis Polonia loaded the bases with nobody out. Don Baylor hit a sacrifice fly that scored McGwire and made the score 4–1. Smith retired the next two hitters, but the Red Sox were finished. Eckersley finished the ninth to get his fourth save in only four games, an all-time record (since matched by John Wetteland in the 1996 World Series and Greg Holland in the 2014 ALCS). Eckersley won the Most Valuable Player Award for his efforts.

== Composite box ==
1988 ALCS (4–0): Oakland Athletics over Boston Red Sox

Team	1	2	3	4	5	6	7	8	9	R	H	E
Oakland Athletics	1	4	3	1	1	0	4	5	1	20	41	3
Boston Red Sox	3	2	0	0	0	3	3	0	0	11	26	1
Total attendance: 167,376 Average attendance: 41,844
