= Joe Morgan (baseball manager) =

American baseball player (1930–2026)

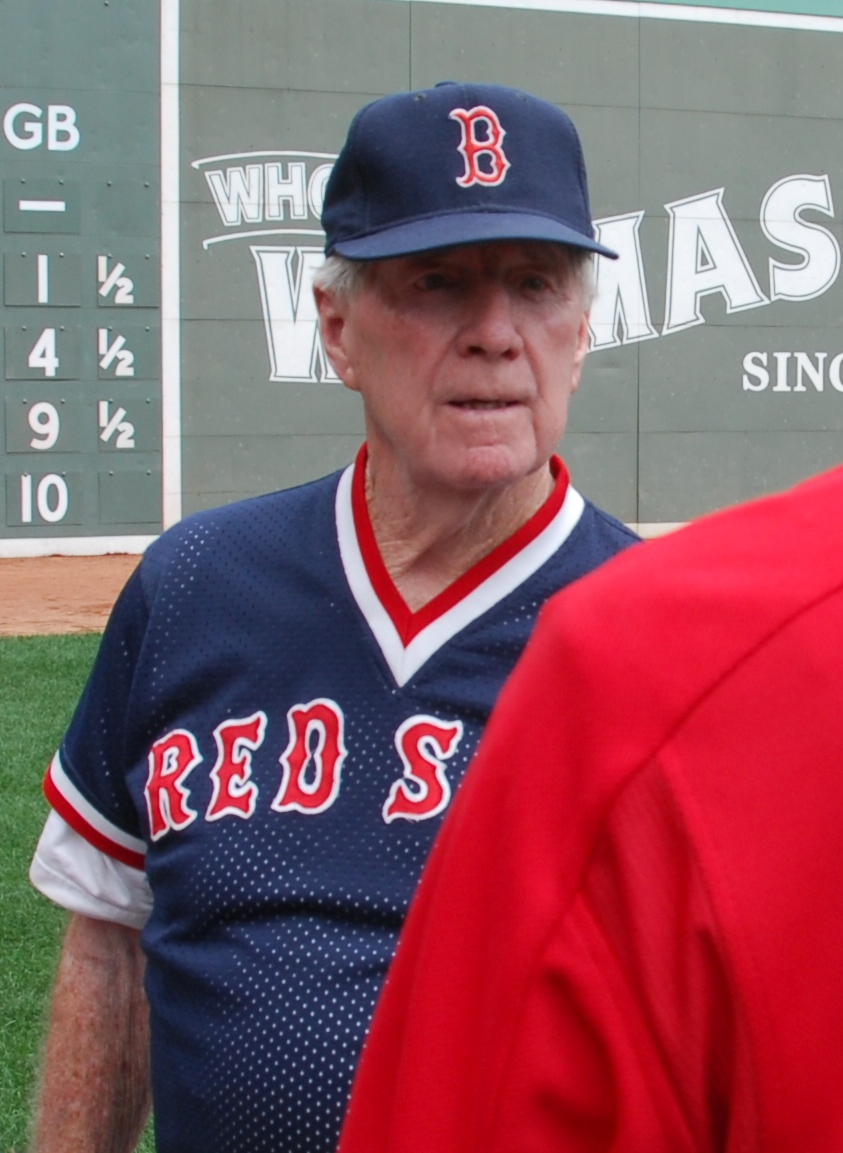
- Morgan in 2008
- Third baseman / Second baseman / Outfielder / Manager
- Born: November 19, 1930; Walpole, Massachusetts, U.S.
- Died: September 5, 2026 (aged 95); Walpole, Massachusetts, U.S.
- Batted: Left Threw: Right

MLB debut
- April 14, 1959, for the Milwaukee Braves

Last MLB appearance
- October 3, 1964, for the St. Louis Cardinals

MLB statistics
- Batting average: .193
- Home runs: 2
- Runs batted in: 10
- Stats at Baseball Reference

Teams
- As player: Milwaukee Braves (1959); Kansas City Athletics (1959); Philadelphia Phillies (1960); Cleveland Indians (1960–1961); St. Louis Cardinals (1964); As manager: Boston Red Sox (1988–1991); As coach: Pittsburgh Pirates (1972); Boston Red Sox (1985–1988)

Career highlights and awards
- Boston Red Sox Hall of Fame

Joseph Michael Morgan (November 19, 1930 – September 5, 2026) was an American infielder, manager, coach and scout in Major League Baseball (MLB). He played in MLB for the Milwaukee Braves, Kansas City Athletics, Philadelphia Phillies, Cleveland Indians, and St. Louis Cardinals from 1959 to 1964. He managed the Boston Red Sox from 1988 to 1991.

== Early life ==
A native and lifelong resident of Walpole, Massachusetts, Morgan was born on November 19, 1930, the son of Irish immigrants from County Clare. He graduated from Walpole High School and attended Boston College, where he played varsity hockey—he was a center who led the Eagles in points as a junior—as well as baseball. Morgan was also elected as team captain for Boston College's baseball team during his junior year. He signed his first professional baseball contract on June 20, 1952, with his then-hometown National League team, the Boston Braves.

== Playing career ==
Morgan stood 5 feet 10 inches (1.78 m) tall and weighed 170 pounds (77 kg) during his playing career. When he made his major-league debut at age 28 in 1959, after military service and a stint in the minor leagues, his parent team had become the Milwaukee Braves.

A left-handed-hitting second baseman, third baseman and outfielder, Morgan batted over the .300 mark three times in the high minors between 1956 and 1959. He could not, however, secure a spot in the Braves' starting lineup, nor with the other major-league teams he played for. In parts of four major-league seasons, he appeared in 88 games, collected 36 hits, and batted .193. His two major-league home runs came during his stint with the 1960 Cleveland Indians within a two-week period, as he hit solo shots off Chuck Estrada on August 30 and Ted Sadowski on September 10. In the latter contest, Morgan's three hits and two runs scored helped the Indians to a 5–4 victory over the Washington Senators.

In 13 seasons in the minor leagues, Morgan had 1,353 hits (with 117 home runs) and compiled a lifetime batting mark of .278. He was named most valuable player of the Triple-A International League in 1964, after batting .290 with 16 home runs for the Jacksonville Suns.

== Managerial career ==
=== Pittsburgh Pirates' organization ===
In 1966, Morgan became a manager in the farm system of the Pittsburgh Pirates, recommended for the assignment by Pittsburgh manager Harry "The Hat" Walker, who had been his skipper in Jacksonville. Morgan spent two seasons in Class A ball as pilot of the Raleigh Pirates, then was promoted to Double-A York of the Eastern League for a two-year stint; his 1969 York club posted a league-best 89–50 record. He oversaw prospects such as Richie Hebner, Ángel Mangual, Don Money, Al Oliver, Manny Sanguillén and Richie Zisk at Raleigh and York.

Then, in 1970, Morgan rose to the Pirates' Triple-A assignment as skipper of the Columbus Jets of the International League. In 1971, he moved with the Jets to Charleston, West Virginia, and became skipper of the Charleston Charlies. His 1970–1971 teams, which included prospects Dave Cash, Bruce Kison, Milt May and Rennie Stennett, made the IL playoffs each season.

Morgan was called to the major leagues to serve as a Pittsburgh coach under Bill Virdon in 1972, when the Pirates won the National League East Division title but fell in the 1972 NLCS to the Cincinnati Reds. When the Bucs decided to trim the size of their 1973 staff, Morgan returned to Charleston for a final season as the Pirates' Triple-A manager. The 1973 Charlies—who included future Hall-of-Famer Dave Parker and longtime major-league manager Art Howe—won 85 games and the division title, but lost in the International League playoffs to the Pawtucket Red Sox in five games. Nevertheless, Morgan was selected Minor League Manager of the Year for 1973 by The Sporting News.

=== Pawtucket Red Sox ===
Morgan joined the Boston Red Sox organization the following season to become skipper of its Pawtucket affiliate, located 24 miles (38 km) from his Walpole hometown. He led the "PawSox" for nine years (1974–1982), the longest-tenured manager in the franchise's history. Morgan's teams won 601 games, losing 658 (.477). His players over that nine-year period included Hall of Famers Jim Rice and Wade Boggs, and other standouts such as Marty Barrett, Rick Burleson, Rich Gedman, Bruce Hurst, Fred Lynn, Bob Ojeda and John Tudor. Morgan's best PawSox squads, the 1977 and 1978 editions, won a combined 161 games and made the finals of the Governors' Cup playoffs each season. He won the International League Manager of the Year Award in 1977.

He was the Pawtucket skipper during its notable 33-inning game against Rochester in April 1981; Morgan was ejected in the 22nd frame of the marathon, which ultimately concluded on June 23 with a PawSox victory.

=== Boston Red Sox ===
The parent Red Sox reassigned Morgan after the 1982 season, making him a scout during 1983 and 1984, before he was finally invited to return to the majors as Boston's first-base coach in 1985. He worked as the team's bullpen coach during the Red Sox's 1986 pennant-winning season, then replaced Rene Lachemann as Boston's third-base coach in 1987.

The following season, the 1988 Red Sox were a disappointing one game over .500 under manager John McNamara, leading the ownership to fire him during the break for that season's All-Star game. They named Morgan acting manager on July 14 and were reported to be interested in high-profile candidates, such as Joe Torre and Lou Piniella, under contract to other organizations, as eventual permanent replacements. However, the Red Sox won their first 12 games under Morgan, and 19 of the first 20 games he managed. The press coined the hot streak "Morgan Magic" and the team removed the interim tag, naming him manager. The 1988 Red Sox won the AL East, but were swept by the Oakland Athletics in the American League Championship Series (ALCS). Two years later, the 1990 Red Sox again won their division, clinching the title on the final day of the season, and making Morgan the first Red Sox manager to lead a team to the postseason twice in a three-year span since Bill Carrigan in 1915-16-18. The Red Sox were again eliminated in the postseason in four straight games by Oakland in the ALCS. Overall, the Red Sox were 0–8 in the postseason under Morgan.

In 1991, Morgan guided Boston to a second-place finish in the AL East. The team had difficulties in June and July before maneuvering their way back in early September; as late as the 21st, they were just one-half game behind Toronto in the AL East. However, they lost 11 of their last 14 games and finished seven games behind the Toronto Blue Jays. Although he had one year remaining on his contract, he was fired at season's end in favor of Butch Hobson. Under Hobson, the 1992 Red Sox finished last in the AL East.

Morgan's final major-league managerial totals were 301–262 (.535) over 3 1/2 years, all with the Red Sox. His record as a minor league manager over 16 seasons (1966–1971; 1973–1982) was 1,140 victories and 1,102 defeats (.508) with one league championship (with the York Pirates of the Double-A Eastern League in 1969).

==== Managerial record ====
Team	Year	Regular season					Postseason			
Team	Year	Games	Won	Lost	Win %	Finish	Won	Lost	Win %	Result
BOS	1988	77	46	31	.597	1st in AL East	0	4	.000	Lost ALCS (OAK)
BOS	1989	162	83	79	.512	3rd in AL East	–	–	–	–
BOS	1990	162	88	74	.543	1st in AL East	0	4	.000	Lost ALCS (OAK)
BOS	1991	162	84	78	.519	3rd in AL East	–	–	–	–
Total		563	301	262	.535		0	8	.000	

== Popularity ==
Morgan was called "Walpole Joe," as well as "Turnpike Joe" in tribute to the offseason job he held for many years to supplement his minor-league pay, driving a snowplow on the Massachusetts Turnpike. The nicknames also served to prevent any confusion with Baseball Hall of Fame second baseman Joe Morgan. Some of his phrases, such as "I'm the skipper of this nine!" (during a disagreement with outfielder Jim Rice) and "Roger spun another beauty" (describing one of the outings of pitcher Roger Clemens) were highlighted by the press.

In 2006, Morgan was named to the Boston Red Sox Hall of Fame and the Walpole High School Hockey Hall of Fame. He was inducted into the International League Hall of Fame in 2008. On July 30, 2013, the Red Sox honored him with "Joe Morgan Night" at Fenway Park, with Clemens among the former players participating in the festivities.

== Personal life and death ==
Morgan married Dorothy "Dottie" Glebus in 1956; they were married for 60 years before her death in 2016. They had four children: Catherine, Joseph Jr., William and Barbara. Morgan died on September 5, 2026, at the age of 95. Attendees at his funeral included Marty Barrett, Dwight Evans, Rich Gedman, and Bruce Hurst.

Sporting positions
Preceded by Don Hoak	Columbus Jets manager 1970	Succeeded by Franchise relocated
Preceded by Franchise established Red Davis	Charleston Charlies manager 1971; 1973	Succeeded by Red Davis; Steve Demeter
Preceded by Darrell Johnson	Pawtucket Red Sox manager 1974–1982	Succeeded by Tony Torchia
Preceded by Tommy Harper	Boston Red Sox first-base coach 1985	Succeeded by Walt Hriniak
Preceded by Tony Torchia	Boston Red Sox bullpen coach 1986	Succeeded by Rac Slider
Preceded by Rene Lachemann	Boston Red Sox third-base coach 1987–1988	Succeeded by Rac Slider
