= John Trautwein =

American baseball player (born 1962)

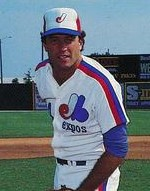
- Pitcher
- Born: August 7, 1962 (age 63); Lafayette Hill, Pennsylvania, U.S.
- Batted: Right Threw: Right

MLB debut
- April 7, 1988, for the Boston Red Sox

Last MLB appearance
- August 16, 1988, for the Boston Red Sox

MLB statistics
- Games pitched: 9
- Win–loss record: 0–1
- Earned run average: 9.00
- Strikeouts: 8
- Stats at Baseball Reference

Teams
- Boston Red Sox (1988)

John Howard Trautwein (born August 7, 1962) is an American former relief pitcher in Major League Baseball who played briefly for the Boston Red Sox during the 1988 season. Listed at 6' 3", 205 lb., Trautwein batted and threw right-handed.

== Amateur career ==
Trautwein attended Northwestern University, and in 1982 he played collegiate summer baseball with the Chatham A's of the Cape Cod Baseball League. He earned a degree in chemistry from Northwestern, was Academic All Big-10 and captained Northwestern's most successful baseball team in school history in 1984.

== Professional career ==
In 1984, Trautwein was purchased by the Montreal Expos from the Helena Gold Sox of the Pioneer League. Then, in 1987 he was obtained by Boston from the Expos in the Rule 5 draft, and spent the entire 1988 season as a member of the Red Sox pitching staff.

In 1995, Trautwein played for a team in Bournemouth, England.

== Personal life ==
John and his wife Susie Trautwein founded the Will To Live Foundation, Inc., a public charity that is dedicated to spreading the awareness and education of teen suicide in America and around the world. They started the foundation after the suicide of their oldest child, Will, who killed himself in October 2010.

Trautwein wrote a book about his son Will's suicide, and the creation of the Will To Live Foundation, My Living Will: A Father's Story of Loss & Hope which was published in December 2014.

== See also ==
- 1988 Boston Red Sox season
