= Bruce Hurst =

American baseball player (born 1958)

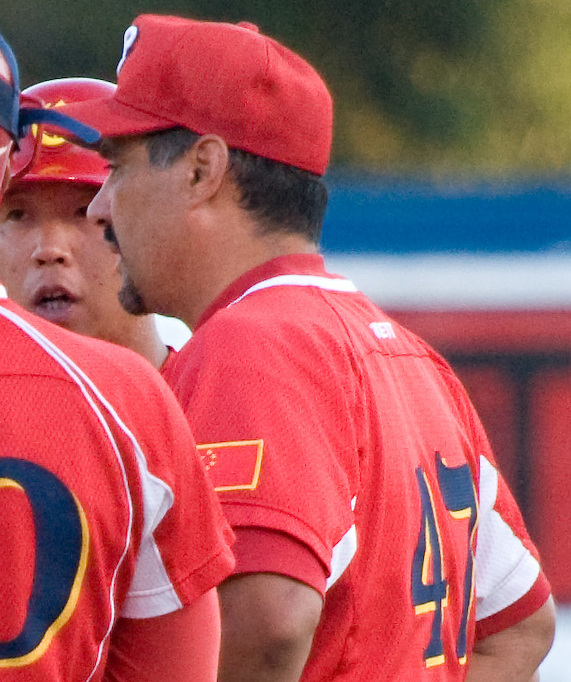
- Hurst with the China national baseball team in 2008
- Pitcher
- Born: March 24, 1958 (age 68); St. George, Utah, U.S.
- Batted: Left Threw: Left

MLB debut
- April 12, 1980, for the Boston Red Sox

Last MLB appearance
- June 18, 1994, for the Texas Rangers

MLB statistics
- Win–loss record: 145–113
- Earned run average: 3.92
- Strikeouts: 1,689
- Stats at Baseball Reference

Teams
- Boston Red Sox (1980–1988); San Diego Padres (1989–1993); Colorado Rockies (1993); Texas Rangers (1994)

Career highlights and awards
- All-Star (1987); Boston Red Sox Hall of Fame

Bruce Vee Hurst (born March 24, 1958) is an American former Major League Baseball left-handed starting pitcher. He is best remembered for his performance for the Boston Red Sox in the 1986 postseason, where he won two games while allowing only two runs total. Prior to the miraculous Game 6 comeback by the New York Mets, he was the presumed World Series MVP. Two days later, in Game 7, Hurst was sent out to pitch the decisive game for the Sox, but he left with a no-decision when Boston saw a three run lead turn into a tie in the sixth with Hurst on the mound (New York eventually won the game and the Series); Hurst pitched a total of 23 innings, most among any pitcher in the Series and allowed five earned runs.

== Early life ==
Hurst grew up in St. George, Utah, the youngest of five children born to John and Beth Hurst, who divorced when he was five years old. At an early age, doctors prescribed plaster casts to correct a condition that was causing his legs to bow.

Hurst was a standout basketball player, leading Dixie High School to the state tournament in his junior and senior seasons, despite suffering a cracked vertebra as a senior, and would receive basketball scholarship offers. He played basketball at Dixie Junior College for the 1979–80 season. In 2015, Hurst told The Boston Globe that he would shoot hoops at Boston Celtics practices during his Red Sox days after developing a friendship with Celtics guard Danny Ainge.

Hurst has attributed his early interest and development in baseball to Kent Garrett, a coach and former Brigham Young University player who had him analyze magazine photos of pitcher windups, with Hurst practicing his own windup in front of a three-way mirror. Hurst caught the eye of MLB scouts after his junior year during an American Legion state tournament. He would average 14 strikeouts a game as a senior, compiling a 24–2 record in high school.

== Professional career ==
=== Boston Red Sox ===
==== 1976–1979: Minor leagues ====
Hurst was selected by the Red Sox with the 22nd overall pick in the 1976 Major League Baseball draft. He was the 11th pitcher selected. The Red Sox assigned him to the Elmira Pioneers of the New York-Penn League, where Hurst was 3–2 with a 3.00 earned run average across nine starts.

Hurst spent the 1977 season with the Winter Haven Red Sox in the Florida State League, going 5–4 in 13 starts with a 2.08 ERA, before incurring an elbow injury.

In 1978, the Red Sox promoted Hurst to the Bristol Red Sox of the Eastern League, where he lodged six starts before having his season shut down with shoulder soreness, ending with a 1–3 record and a 2.73 ERA.

Hurst started the 1979 season with Winter Haven, going 8–2 in 12 starts with a 1.93 ERA, then finishing the year in Bristol where, across 15 starts and one relief appearance, he had a 9–4 record with a 3.58 ERA.

==== 1980–1981: MLB debut and time in Triple-A ====
Hurst made Boston's opening day roster in 1980. He made his major league debut on April 12, coming on in relief in the second game of the season and giving up five earned runs in an inning of work in an 18–1 blowout at the hands of the Milwaukee Brewers. He made six more appearances, all starts, before being optioned to the Pawtucket Red Sox of the International League on May 14. He went 8–6 for Pawtucket over the next three months with a 3.94 ERA, with Boston recalling him in August to the parent club. He ended 1980 with a 2–2 record and 9.10 ERA at the major league level.

Returning to Pawtucket for the 1981 season, Hurst went 12–7 with a 2.87 ERA. In Pawtucket, he played in the longest professional baseball game, with 32 innings played on April 18 and 19 against the Rochester Red Wings, with the final inning played later on June 23. Hurst came on as a reliever for the 28th inning and pitched five innings without giving up a run, later recollecting striking out Cal Ripken Jr. on a breaking ball at 4 a.m. prior to the league's commissioner ordering the suspension of play at the end of the inning. Bob Ojeda was credited with the win after pitching the 33rd inning on June 23.

After spending the 1981 minor league season in Pawtucket, Hurst received a September call-up, going 2–0 in five starts with a 4.30 ERA.

==== 1982–1985 ====
Hurst became a regular in the Red Sox rotation in the 1982 season, starting 19 games with another nine relief appearances en route to a 3–7 record and a 5.77 ERA. He solidified his starting status the following season, going 12–12 with a 4.09 ERA across 32 starts and one relief appearance in 1983.

With the departures of John Tudor and Dennis Eckersley, Hurst became Boston's top starter in 1984, getting the nod on opening day and giving up two unearned runs in 8 1/3 innings in a 2-1 road loss to the California Angels. He bounced back with a four-hit shutout of the Oakland Athletics, then was chased from his Fenway Park home opener after giving up seven runs while recording only one out. Hurst was 12–12 on the season with a 3.92 ERA, tying with Ojeda and Oil Can Boyd for the team lead in wins and losses.

Getting off to a slow start in the 1985 season, Hurst was demoted to the bullpen for a portion of June and requested a trade. Hurst turned around his season with the addition of a forkball as a third pitch to his curveball and fastball. Hurst credited former Detroit Tigers coach Roger Craig for teaching him the concept of the forkball and former Baltimore Orioles pitcher Mike Boddicker for schooling him in the grip, confirmed later by Boddicker who described the pitch as a "foshball" that was essentially "a glorified changeup."

Hurst said in an interview that that when his curve and forkball were fooling hitters, "I think I can get by with a mediocre fastball." Hurst would later pinpoint his revival to a single moment during a July 3 game against Milwaukee when batter Paul Molitor easily fouled off a Hurst pitch, at which point Hurst recollected telling himself "no more" and bore down to get the strikeout, one of 10 that day for the first time in his career. With his ERA having peaked at 6.66 on June 23, Hurst would finish the season with an overall 4.51 ERA and an 11–13 record.

==== 1986: World Series ====
Hurst had gone 42–46 with a 4.59 ERA with the Red Sox before his breakthrough 1986 season, on a staff anchored by Cy Young Award winner Roger Clemens. Hurst posted a 2.99 ERA with 13 victories despite spending six midsummer weeks on the disabled list with a pulled groin. The Red Sox won the American League East by 5.5 games over the New York Yankees to head to the 1986 American League Championship Series against the California Angels. Hurst went 1–0 with a 2.40 ERA in two starts in the ALCS won by the Sox in seven games.

Hurst pitched brilliantly in the World Series, holding the New York Mets to just four hits in the Game 1 pitchers' duel with Ron Darling won 1–0 by the Red Sox. In Game 5, Hurst pitched a complete game victory to give Boston a 3–2 lead in the Series.

Prior to the Mets' historic rally in Game 6 to win the game and even the series, a vote had been taken for World Series Most Valuable Player, with Hurst set to receive the award based on his performances in his two prior starts. However, with the postponement of Game 7 by one night due to heavy rain that washed through the New York metropolitan area following Game 6, Hurst received a third start in the series when Boston manager John McNamara, who had originally planned to start Oil Can Boyd in the decisive game, decided to hand him the ball on three days' rest.

Hurst again pitched well early on, only giving up a single to Ray Knight] through five innings while the Red Sox staked him to a 3-0 lead after recording solo home runs by Dwight Evans and Rich Gedman and an RBI single by Wade Boggs in the second inning. But in the sixth, the Mets rallied to tie the game with Keith Hernandez driving in two runs with a single and Gary Carter recording a fielder's choice to score the tying run. Hurst would leave the game after that inning and ultimately recorded a no decision as the Mets added five more runs over the next two innings to win the game and the series; Knight would usurp Hurst as the MVP when the final vote was tallied.

==== 1987–1988: Accolades and postseason return ====
Hurst had a 9–6 record and 3.81 ERA when McNamara added him to the 1987 American League All-Star team. However, he did not appear in the game. He ended the season with a middling 15–13 record as the Red Sox finished the season 20 games behind the first place Detroit Tigers.

Hurst was 9–4 with a 4.60 ERA midway through the 1988 season when the Red Sox replaced McNamara at manager with Joe Morgan, who had been Pawtucket manager during Hurst's tenure there. The Sox were in fifth place, nine games back of the first place Tigers at the time of the managerial change. The team went 46-31 from that point forward to finish one game ahead of Detroit in the AL East.

Hurst went 9–2 with a 2.54 ERA under his new manager to end the season at 18–6, finishing fifth in balloting for the American League Cy Young Award that season. He pitched a complete game in Game 1 of the 1988 American League Championship Series against the Oakland Athletics, but was outmatched by Oakland's ace, Dave Stewart. With Boston down three games to none, the two faced off again in Game 4 with Stewart and the A's again emerging victorious to complete the sweep.

=== San Diego Padres ===
Hurst became a free agent following the 1988 season. He signed a three-year contract with the San Diego Padres worth $5.25 million. Hurst indicated at the time that San Diego's relative proximity to St. George was the primary factor in his decision to leave Boston, and later expressed regret in leaving the Red Sox.

On April 10, 1989, he pitched a one-hitter against the Atlanta Braves for his first National League win and also collected his first MLB hit as a batter. He was the first Padres pitcher to strike out 13 batters while allowing only one hit. He went 15–11 with a career-best 2.69 ERA that season and led the National League with 10 complete games.

On May 18, 1992, Hurst pitched a one-hit shutout over Dwight Gooden and the Mets. The only hit was a single by Chico Walker. At the end of the season, Hurst began feeling pain in his left shoulder and underwent surgery to repair a torn rotator cuff and labrum. The rehabilitation was arduous, and Hurst started only twice for the Padres in the first half of 1993, allowing 6 earned runs in 4 1/3 innings.

=== Colorado Rockies ===
The Padres traded Hurst and Greg Harris to the Colorado Rockies on July 26, 1993 for Brad Ausmus, Doug Bochtler, and Andy Ashby. Hurst started just three games for Colorado, never finishing the fourth inning.

=== Texas Rangers ===
Hurst signed with the Texas Rangers for the 1994 season. He was 2–1 with a 7.11 ERA in eight starts through June. With the repercussions of the surgery still lingering, he decided to retire less than three months into the season.

== Career stats ==
W	L	PCT	ERA	G	GS	CG	SHO	SV	IP	H	ER	R	HR	BB	K	WP	HBP	Fld%
145	113	.562	3.92	379	359	83	23	0	2417.1	2463	1052	1143	258	740	1689	56	28	.968

Never overpowering hitters, Hurst was a specialist at changing speeds. His fastball was hard enough to get in on right-handed hitters, and he mixed it with a curve and a slider as well. He also had a decent forkball at times. Thanks to his control, Hurst was able to work corners well and had a knowledge of each hitter. In seven postseason games, he had a 3–2 record with 37 strikeouts and a 2.29 ERA in 51 innings.

== Post-playing activities ==
Hurst was inducted to the Boston Red Sox Hall of Fame in November 2004, on the heels of the Red Sox 2004 World Series victory, the club's first since 1918. Believers of "The Curse of the Bambino" have pointed out the letters "BRUCE HURST" can be re-arranged as "B RUTH CURSE". With his mother Beth having died in December 2003 on the eve of the Red Sox World Series win in 2004, Hurst was quoted saying years later, "I'm pretty sure, knowing my mom, that she would have gone up and put her arm around Babe and said, 'Let's get this over with.'"

In 2005, Hurst and Jim Lefebvre coached China to a bronze medal at the 23rd Asian Baseball Championship, the first time ever that China had defeated one of the "Big Three" Asian teams (Japan, South Korea, Chinese Taipei). In 2006, Hurst and Lefebvre also led the Chinese team in the inaugural World Baseball Classic, where they were eliminated in the first round of competition in the Asian bracket, which also featured eventual tournament champion Japan, as well as Korea and Chinese Taipei. Hurst also coached China alongside manager John McLaren in the Asian Baseball Championship in 2012 and 2013 World Baseball Classic.

Hurst returned to the Boston Red Sox during spring training in 2008 as a pitching instructor. On February 26, 2008, Hurst was named as Special Assistant for Player Development with the Red Sox. He worked for part of the 2015 season for the Los Angeles Dodgers, serving as a talent evaluator for players in Latin America.

During his 2019 Pawtucket Red Sox Hall of Fame induction ceremony, Clemens credited Hurst for giving him the nickname "Rocketman." In a 2015 interview, Hurst described Clemens as "the greatest teammate ever."

== Personal life ==
Hurst met his wife Holly in 1979 during offseason studies at Dixie Junior College in St. George. They married in 1981, the year he graduated. They have four children. Hurst was inducted into Dixie State's athletic hall of fame in 2011, and the school's baseball field is named for him.

In 1999, Hurst and his wife moved to Gilbert, Arizona.

Hurst is a member of The Church of Jesus Christ of Latter-day Saints.
