= Dick Berardino =

- Coach
- Born: July 2, 1937 (age 89); Cambridge, Massachusetts, U.S.
- Bats: Right Throws: Right
- Stats at Baseball Reference

Teams
- Boston Red Sox (1989–1991)

Richard John Berardino (born July 2, 1937) is an American player development consultant for the Boston Red Sox of Major League Baseball (MLB). A former outfielder and longtime manager in Minor League Baseball, he also spent three years (1989–1991) as a coach with the Red Sox. As a player, Berardino batted and threw right-handed, stood 6 feet 1 inch (1.85 m) tall and weighed 190 pounds (86 kg).

== Biography ==
Berardino was a three-sport star at Watertown, Massachusetts, High School. He graduated from the College of the Holy Cross in 1959 after leading the Crusaders to the 1958 NCAA District One baseball championship. Upon graduation, he signed with the New York Yankees and batted .378 in his first professional season, with the Modesto Reds of the Class C California League. He reached Triple-A for three seasons (1962–1964), playing for the Richmond Virginians, Indianapolis Indians and Spokane Indians, but never broke through to the major league level. In total, Berardino appeared in 812 minor league games, and batted .272 with 702 hits and 70 home runs.

Berardino compiled a record of 753 wins and 858 losses (.467) with two championships in 21 seasons (1966–1967; 1971–1985; 1987–1988; 1997–1998) as a minor league manager. Nineteen of those 21 seasons were spent in short-season leagues. Berardino managed two full-season Class A clubs, the Greensboro Hornets of the South Atlantic League in 1987, and the Lynchburg Red Sox of the Carolina League the following season. His managing career began in the Yankee organization, where he handled Rookie-level clubs in the Gulf Coast League and Appalachian League. In 1968, Berardino joined the Red Sox organization as a minor league coach, and 2017 marked his 50th consecutive year with Boston. From 1971 through 1985, he spent 15 consecutive seasons as the manager of the Red Sox' Class A Short Season New York–Penn League farm teams, the Williamsport Red Sox and the Elmira Pioneers (also known as the Red Sox and Suns during his 13-year tenure there). Berardino returned to the New York–Penn League a dozen years later, in 1997–1998, as manager of the Lowell Spinners.

In addition to his minor league managerial and coaching assignments, and his three years as bullpen coach and third-base coach on the major league staff of Joe Morgan in Boston, he also had roles with the Red Sox as spring training coordinator, assistant field coordinator of minor league instruction, and roving outfield and baserunning coach.

Berardino's grandson, Ryan Berardino, was selected by the Red Sox in the 34th round of the 2019 MLB draft out of Bentley University. Ryan Berardino's other grandfather is former Red Sox player Dwight Evans.

== Sources ==
- Red Sox Organization Book. Boston: Howe News Bureau, 1983.
- Red Sox 2008 Media Guide.

Preceded by Jerry McNertney	Boston Red Sox bullpen coach 1989–1990	Succeeded by John McLaren
Preceded by Rac Slider	Boston Red Sox third-base coach 1991	Succeeded by Don Zimmer
Preceded by Billy Gardner Jr.	Lowell Spinners manager 1997–1998	Succeeded by Luis Aguayo
