= Jeff Sellers =

American baseball player (born 1964)

- Pitcher
- Born: May 11, 1964 (age 62); Compton, California, U.S.
- Batted: Right Threw: Right

MLB debut
- September 15, 1985, for the Boston Red Sox

Last MLB appearance
- October 1, 1988, for the Boston Red Sox

MLB statistics
- Win–loss record: 13–22
- Earned run average: 4.97
- Strikeouts: 226
- Stats at Baseball Reference

Teams
- Boston Red Sox (1985–1988)

Jeffrey Doyle Sellers (born May 11, 1964) is an American former professional baseball pitcher. He played in Major League Baseball (MLB) for the Boston Red Sox.

== Biography ==
Sellers played high school baseball for Paramount High School in California, and was drafted by the Red Sox after graduating in 1982.

In a four-season major league career (1985–1988), Sellers posted a 13–22 record with 226 strikeouts and a 4.97 ERA in 329 2/3 innings pitched, including seven complete games and two shutouts.

On October 1, 1988, Sellers flirted with a no-hitter through 7 1/3 innings until Luis Medina of the Cleveland Indians hit a home run accounting for the only run in a 1–0 victory over the Red Sox. Sellers struck out 10 Cleveland batters in the losing effort, which turned out to be his last major league appearance.

Before the 1989 season, Sellers, Todd Benzinger, and a minor leaguer were sent by Boston to the Cincinnati Reds in the same transaction that brought Nick Esasky and Rob Murphy to the Red Sox. But Sellers suffered an injury the following spring and did not play in MLB for the Reds. He went on to play in the minor league systems of the Reds, New York Yankees, Texas Rangers and Colorado Rockies before retiring for good after the 1994 season.

Jeff Sellers is the father of Justin Sellers, a former infielder for the Los Angeles Dodgers.
