= Luis Medina (designated hitter) =

American baseball player (born 1963)

Louie Medina
- Designated hitter / First baseman
- Born: March 26, 1963 (age 63); Santa Monica, California, U.S.
- Batted: Right Threw: Left

Professional debut
- MLB: September 2, 1988, for the Cleveland Indians
- NPB: April 10, 1993, for the Hiroshima Toyo Carp

Last appearance
- MLB: June 13, 1991, for the Cleveland Indians
- NPB: August 5, 1995, for the Hiroshima Toyo Carp

MLB statistics
- Batting average: .207
- Home runs: 10
- Runs batted in: 16

NPB statistics
- Batting average: .262
- Home runs: 18
- Runs batted in: 82
- Stats at Baseball Reference

Teams
- Cleveland Indians (1988–1989, 1991); Hiroshima Toyo Carp (1993–1995)

Luis Main "Louie" Medina (born March 26, 1963) is an American former designated hitter/first baseman in Major League Baseball who played for the Cleveland Indians (1988–89, 1991). He batted right-handed and threw left-handed. He is currently working in the Kansas City Royals front office.

== Playing career ==
In a three-season career, Medina was a .207 hitter (31-for-150) with 10 home runs and 16 RBI in 51 games played.

Drafted out of Arizona State University, the 6 ft 3 in (1.91 m), 220-pound Medina reached the major leagues for good in 1988 after leading all Triple-A players with 28 home runs for Colorado Springs. He also finished fourth in the Pacific Coast League with 81 RBI and hit .310, despite being disabled three weeks with an elbow injury. Medina joined the Cleveland Indians when rosters expanded in September. He hit his first two major league home runs off Tommy John at Yankee Stadium (September 7), then hit a home run which accounted for the only run in a 1–0 victory over the Boston Red Sox and Jeff Sellers, who flirted with a no-hitter through 7 1/3 innings (October 1). Medina hit .255 with six home runs and eight RBI in 51 at-bats following his late season promotion, but new injuries affected his playing time in the next two years. He appeared in only five games for Cleveland in 1991, his last major league season.

After that, he played in Japan for the Hiroshima Toyo Carp from 1993 to 1995 and ended his professional career with Class-A Lansing in 2000. As of 2006, Medina is one of 19 Colorado Springs players to hit 20 home runs during a regular season. He was the only player to do so twice.

Medina was one of those rare players who were not primarily pitchers in major league history who threw left-handed but batted right-handed. Medina also holds the trivial distinction of having the fewest career RBI among all players with exactly 10 career home runs.

== Post-playing career ==
In 2001, Medina was hired by the Kansas City Royals to work in their front office. He was hired as Special Assistant to the General Manager/Player Personnel in 2007.

== See also ==
- Major leaguers who played for the Arizona State Sun Devils
- Security Service Field
