= Wade Rowdon =

American baseball player (born 1960)

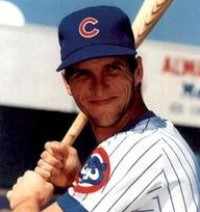
- Third baseman/Pinch hitter/Leftfielder
- Born: September 7, 1960 (age 65); Riverhead, New York, U.S.
- Batted: Right Threw: Right

Professional debut
- MLB: September 8, 1984, for the Cincinnati Reds
- NPB: April 8, 1989, for the Hiroshima Toyo Carp

Last appearance
- MLB: June 19, 1988, for the Baltimore Orioles
- NPB: August 12, 1990, for the Hiroshima Toyo Carp

MLB statistics
- Batting average: .217
- Home runs: 1
- Runs batted in: 16

NPB statistics
- Batting average: .289
- Home runs: 24
- Runs batted in: 94
- Stats at Baseball Reference

Teams
- Cincinnati Reds (1984–1986); Chicago Cubs (1987); Baltimore Orioles (1988); Hiroshima Toyo Carp (1989–1990)

Wade Lee Rowdon (born September 7, 1960) is an American former Major League Baseball player who played from 1984 to 1988 with the Cincinnati Reds, Chicago Cubs and the Baltimore Orioles.

Rowdon attended Stetson University, where he was named team MVP in 1980. In 1980 and 1981, he played collegiate summer baseball for the Orleans Cardinals of the Cape Cod Baseball League, tying a league record with three homers in a single game, and being named the league's Outstanding Pro Prospect in 1981.

On June 9, 1987, Rowdon hit a home run in four consecutive at bats while playing for the Iowa Cubs.
