= Steve Ellsworth =

American baseball player (born 1960)

- Pitcher
- Born: July 30, 1960 (age 65); Chicago, Illinois, U.S.
- Batted: Right Threw: Right

MLB debut
- April 7, 1988, for the Boston Red Sox

Last MLB appearance
- July 8, 1988, for the Boston Red Sox

MLB statistics
- Win-loss record: 1-6
- Earned run average: 6.75
- Strikeouts: 16
- Stats at Baseball Reference

Teams
- Boston Red Sox (1988)

Steven Clark Ellsworth (born July 30, 1960) is an American former professional baseball pitcher who played in Major League Baseball (MLB) for the Boston Red Sox in 1988. He is the son of former MLB pitcher, Dick Ellsworth.

Towering over most of his teammates at 6'8" tall (and 220 pounds), this right-hander attended Bullard High School in Fresno, California. He then went on to attend Cal State Northridge and Fresno City College.

He was drafted twice in 1980, once by the Minnesota Twins in the seventh round and once by the Cleveland Indians in the third round. He didn't sign either time. He was drafted by the Red Sox in the first round of the 1981 draft, 9th overall. This time, he did sign. His professional career started that year, though he appeared in only one professional game, with the low-A Elmira Pioneers of the New York–Penn League. In that one game, he gave up two runs in one inning pitched, while walking two and striking out zero.

Between 1981 and 1988, he was used both as a starter and a reliever in the minors. In 1983 with the Winston-Salem Red Sox, he went 13-8 with a 3.29 ERA in 164+ innings as a starter. In 1986 with the Pawtucket Red Sox, he went 6-2 with a 3.36 ERA in 83 innings of work as a reliever.

On April 7, 1988 at the age of 27, he made his Major League debut. He pitched two innings that game, giving up 8 hits and 5 earned runs. He struck out two, but still earned a loss. The rest of his career didn't fare him too well either – overall, he went 1 and 6 with a 6.75 ERA in 36 innings. He gave up seven home runs, walked 16 and struck out 16. He also hit one batter and threw one wild pitch. Perhaps the best start of his career was his second: On April 16, 1988, he gave up only one run while striking out five in seven innings against the Texas Rangers. Even though he pitched well that game, he still got the loss. His only win came on April 21 against the Detroit Tigers.

In the field, he made no errors for a fielding percentage of 1.000.

Ellsworth played his final game on July 8, 1988.

== See also ==
- List of second-generation Major League Baseball players
