= Zach Crouch =

American baseball player (born 1965)

- Pitcher
- Born: October 26, 1965 (age 59); Folsom, California
- Batted: Left Threw: Left

MLB debut
- June 4, 1988, for the Boston Red Sox

Last MLB appearance
- June 10, 1988, for the Boston Red Sox

MLB statistics
- Win–loss record: 0-0
- Earned run average: 6.75
- Strikeouts: 0
- Stats at Baseball Reference

Teams
- Boston Red Sox (1988)

Zachary Quinn Crouch (born October 26, 1965) is a former relief pitcher in Major League Baseball who played briefly for the Boston Red Sox during the 1988 season.

Crouch, a 6'3", 180 lb. left-handed specialist, was selected by the Boston Red Sox in third round of the 1984 amateur draft. He pitched at five different minor league levels from 1985 to 1988 before joining the big team.

In 102 minor league games, Crouch posted a 27–31 record with a 3.63 ERA in 533.2 innings pitched. In three major league appearances, he recorded a 6.75 ERA without a decision in 1 1/3 innings.

== Sources ==
- Career statistics from Baseball Reference, or Baseball Reference (Minors), or Retrosheet
