= Steve Curry =

American baseball player (born 1965)

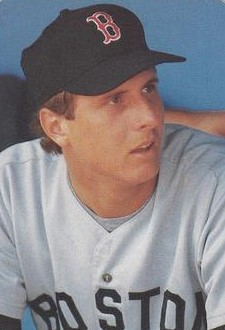
- Pitcher
- Born: September 13, 1965 (age 60); Winter Park, Florida, U.S.
- Batted: Right Threw: Right

MLB debut
- July 10, 1988, for the Boston Red Sox

Last MLB appearance
- July 23, 1988, for the Boston Red Sox

MLB statistics
- Win–loss record: 0–1
- Earned run average: 8.18
- Strikeouts: 4

CPBL statistics
- Win–loss record: 1–2
- Earned run average: 3.44
- Strikeouts: 28
- Stats at Baseball Reference

Teams
- Boston Red Sox (1988); Mercuries Tigers (1996)

Stephen Thomas Curry (born September 13, 1965) is an American former starting pitcher in Major League Baseball who played briefly for the Boston Red Sox during the 1988 season. Listed at 6' 6", 217 lb., he batted and threw right-handed.

In three starts, Curry posted a 0–1 record with four strikeouts and a 8.18 ERA in 11.0 innings pitched.

His son Braden plays baseball for Toledo, while his daughter Lauren plays softball for Northwestern.
