= Rick Rodriguez =

American baseball player (born 1960)

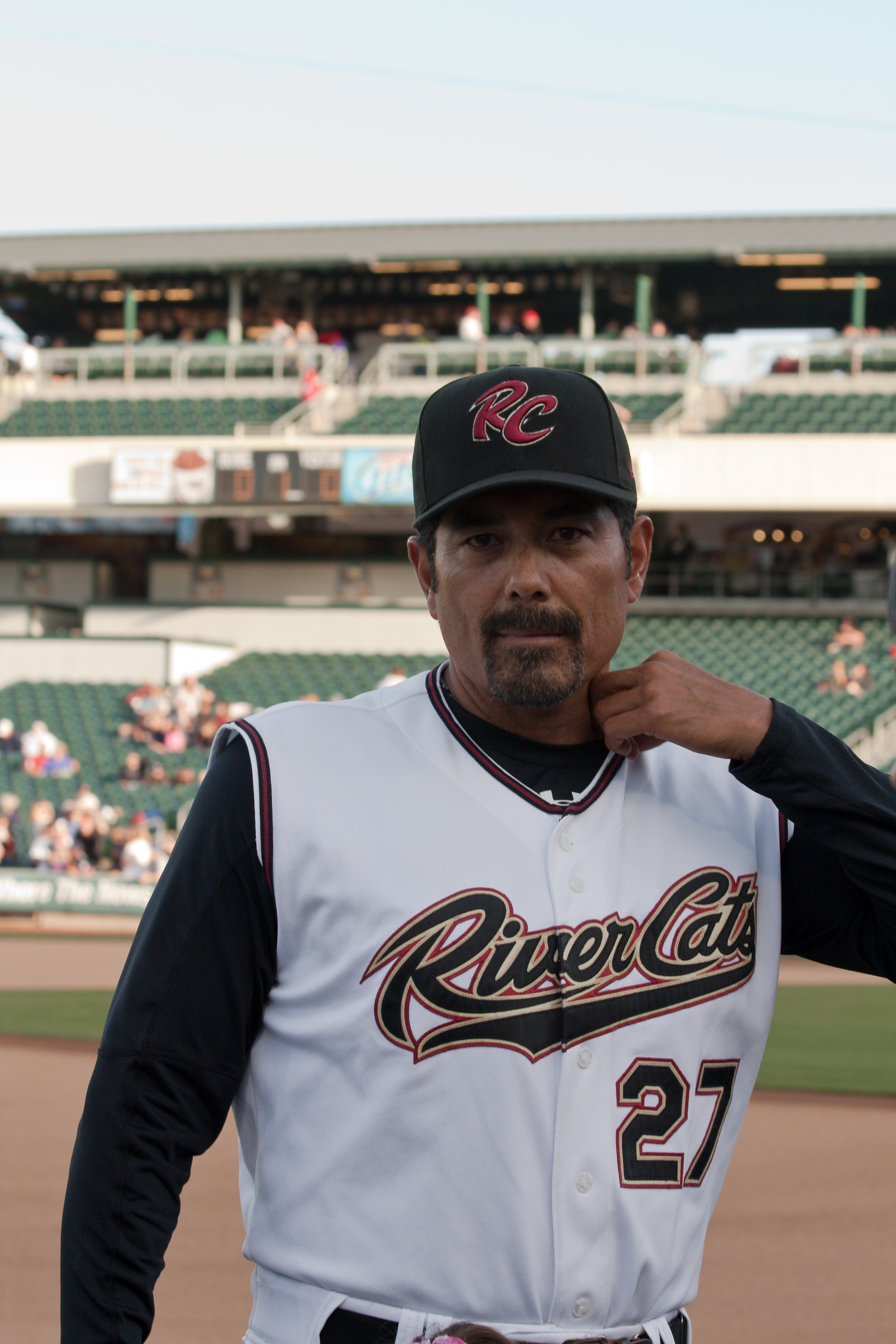
- Rodriguez with the Sacramento River Cats in 2009
- Pitcher
- Born: September 21, 1960 (age 66); Oakland, California, U.S.
- Batted: Right Threw: Right

MLB debut
- September 17, 1986, for the Oakland Athletics

Last MLB appearance
- August 26, 1990, for the San Francisco Giants

MLB statistics
- Win–loss record: 3–4
- Earned run average: 5.73
- Strikeouts: 22
- Stats at Baseball Reference

Teams
- Oakland Athletics (1986–1987); Cleveland Indians (1988); San Francisco Giants (1990)

Ricardo "Rick" Rodriguez (born September 21, 1960) is an American professional baseball coach and former professional baseball pitcher. He pitched in parts of four seasons in the major leagues between 1986 and 1990. He was the bullpen coach for the Oakland Athletics until he was replaced by Darren Bush, former manager of the Sacramento River Cats on October 26, 2012.

== Playing career ==
Rodriguez was drafted by the Athletics in the 2nd round of the 1981 Major League Baseball draft out of the University of California, Riverside, where he had played college baseball for the Highlanders. Previous to Riverside, he went to Castro Valley High School and Chabot College. He spent the next five seasons working his way up through their farm system, reaching the majors for the first time in 1986. He pitched parts of that season and 1987 for the A's, but was released in December 1987.

In January 1988, Rodriguez was signed by the Cleveland Indians, pitching one season in their organization with a brief stint in the majors. He became a free agent after the season, then spent a year in the Chicago White Sox organization before spending his final season with the San Francisco Giants in 1990.

== Coaching career ==
In 1999, Rodriguez returned to the Oakland Athletics organization as a minor league pitching coach. He filled that position with the Modesto A's in 1999, then in 2000 he was promoted to the Triple-A Sacramento River Cats. He has been their pitching coach in every season since, with the exception of 2003, when he spent the season back at Modesto as the team's field manager.

Rodriguez was the bullpen coach for the Oakland Athletics in 2011 and 2012. On October 26, 2012, he was replaced by Darren Bush.

On November 23, 2015, Rodriguez was named as the pitching coach for the Nashville Sounds. In 2026, Rodriguez, was the bullpen coach for the Arizona Complex League Athletics, the rookie-level affiliate of the Athletics.

On August 28, 2026, Rodriguez announced his retirement from coaching.
