= Oswaldo Peraza =

Venezuelan baseball player and coach (born 1962)

Caciques de Distrito
- Pitcher / Coach
- Born: October 19, 1962 (age 63); Puerto Cabello, Carabobo, Venezuela
- Batted: Right Threw: Right

MLB debut
- April 4, 1988, for the Baltimore Orioles

Last MLB appearance
- September 2, 1988, for the Baltimore Orioles

MLB statistics
- Win–loss record: 5–7
- Earned run average: 5.55
- Strikeouts: 61
- Stats at Baseball Reference

Teams
- Baltimore Orioles (1988)

Oswald José Peraza [pay-RAH-za] (born October 19, 1962) is a Venezuelan former professional baseball starting pitcher. He played in Major League Baseball (MLB) for the Baltimore Orioles in 1988. He batted and threw right-handed. As of the 2014 season, he is the pitching coach for the Dominican Summer League Blue Jays. He is the pitching coach for the Caciques de Distrito of the Venezuelan Major League.

== Career ==
Peraza was a hard thrower with a fastball in the 94–95 range. He also had a good slider and a fine change-up. He was traded from the Toronto Blue Jays to the Orioles for Mike Flanagan on August 31, 1987 in a transaction that was completed four days later on September 4 when José Mesa was sent to Baltimore. Peraza debuted with Baltimore in 1988, then missed the following season with arm problems, which were serious enough to affect the rest of his career. In his rookie season, Peraza posted a 10–14 record with 61 strikeouts and a 5.55 of ERA in 86 innings pitched.

Peraza, who was once one of the more highly touted prospects in the game, could not make it out of Triple-A ball after 1988 and he retired for good after three injury riddled years (1990–92).

== See also ==
- List of players from Venezuela in Major League Baseball
