= Dwight Evans (baseball) =

American baseball player (born 1951)

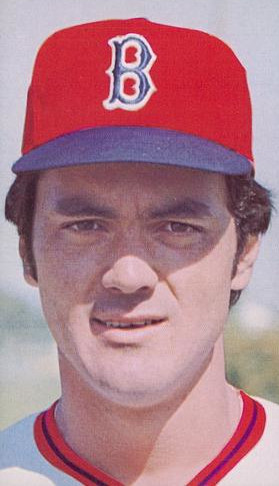
- Evans with the Boston Red Sox in 1976
- Right fielder
- Born: November 3, 1951 (age 74); Santa Monica, California, U.S.
- Batted: Right Threw: Right

MLB debut
- September 16, 1972, for the Boston Red Sox

Last MLB appearance
- October 6, 1991, for the Baltimore Orioles

MLB statistics
- Batting average: .272
- Hits: 2,446
- Home runs: 385
- Runs batted in: 1,384
- Stats at Baseball Reference

Teams
- Boston Red Sox (1972–1990); Baltimore Orioles (1991)

Career highlights and awards
- 3× All-Star (1978, 1981, 1987); 8× Gold Glove Award (1976, 1978, 1979, 1981–1985); 2× Silver Slugger Award (1981, 1987); AL home run leader (1981); Boston Red Sox Hall of Fame

Dwight Michael "Dewey" Evans (born November 3, 1951) is an American former professional baseball right fielder and right-handed batter who played with the Boston Red Sox (1972–1990) and Baltimore Orioles (1991) in Major League Baseball (MLB). He was a three-time All-Star, won eight Gold Glove Awards, and won two Silver Slugger Awards. Evans played the second-most career games for the Red Sox of any player, surpassed only by Carl Yastrzemski.

== Early years ==
Evans was born in Santa Monica, California. He played Pony League and Colt League baseball in Northridge, California, with Doug DeCinces. Dwight attended Granada Hills High School in the tenth grade, but was not happy with the poor treatment he received from the baseball coaches. He then transferred to Chatsworth High School, from which he graduated in 1969.

== Playing career ==
Evans was drafted in the fifth round of the 1969 MLB draft by the Red Sox, with the 107th overall pick, and then played in Boston's minor league system from 1969 through 1972. He played for the Florida Instructional League Red Sox (1969), short season Class A Jamestown Falcons (1969), Single-A Greenville Red Sox (1970), Single-A Winston-Salem Red Sox (1971), and Triple-A Louisville Colonels (1972).

Evans acquired the nickname "Dewey" while playing for Winston-Salem in 1971. It was coined by manager Don Lock who had already called Don Newhauser "Newie" and another teammate "Louie". In 1972, with Louisville, Evans was named MVP of the International League.

=== Boston Red Sox ===
Evans made his major league debut with the Red Sox on September 16, 1972, during a Red Sox 10–0 win over the Cleveland Indians. Evans appeared in a total of 18 games late in that season, batting 15-for-57 (.263) with one home run and six RBIs.

Early in his major league career, Evans was primarily a defensive standout (he would eventually receive eight Gold Glove Awards) with a modest bat. In the second half of his career, he became a powerful hitter, twice winning a Silver Slugger Award.

Originally, Evans was assigned uniform number 40, although quietly he really wanted to wear number 24, the number of his idol Willie Mays. In 1973, the Red Sox gave him number 24, the number he wore for the remainder of his career.

Evans was the Red Sox regular right fielder starting in 1973, a role he would have until 1987. In 1973 he batted .223 with 10 home runs and 32 RBIs, and in 1974 he batted .281 with 10 home runs and 70 RBIs. In 1975, the Red Sox won the AL East and then swept the Oakland Athletics in the 1975 ALCS. Evans batted 1-for-10 against Oakland, being held to a double in the first game. In the 1975 World Series against the Cincinnati Reds, Evans batted 7-for-24 (.292) with a home run and five RBIs. In the historic sixth game, with the score tied 6–6 in the 11th inning, he made a spectacular catch of a drive hit by Reds second baseman Joe Morgan, then threw to first base to complete an inning-ending double play. Then, Carlton Fisk hit his famous walk-off home run in the 12th inning to win the game for the Red Sox, 7–6, forcing a seventh game, which was won the next day by the Reds.

From 1976 through 1980, Evans batted an overall .260 with 94 home runs and 279 RBIs; he was limited to 73 games in 1977 by a knee injury; in each of the other years he appeared in at least 146 games. He was named an All-Star in 1978; he would be an All-Star twice more during his career. In 1981, despite the strike-shortened season, Evans had his best all-around year. He paced the league in total bases (215), OPS (.937), walks (85), times on base (208), and tied Eddie Murray, Tony Armas and Bobby Grich for the home run title with 22. He also ranked second in runs scored (84) and on-base percentage (.415), and third in slugging percentage (.522). He added a .296 batting average with 71 RBIs, was an All-Star for the second time, and received his first Silver Slugger Award.

On Opening Day of 1982, the Red Sox were visiting the Milwaukee Brewers, where Evans watched Sixto Lezcano's famous walk off grand slam in the bottom of the Ninth sail over his head. Brewers announcer Bob Uecker called the homerun as follows: "Here's a drive to deep right-center, way back goes Evans. It's got a chance to gooooo, GOOOONE !!!!!".

From 1982 through 1985, Evans batted an overall .274 with 115 home runs and 338 RBIs; in both 1982 and 1984 he played in every Red Sox game. On June 28, 1984, he hit for the cycle, in a 9–6 extra-innings win over the Seattle Mariners.

In 1986, Evans hit a home run on opening day, April 7, on the first pitch of the MLB season, as Boston and the Detroit Tigers were playing the first game that day. His home run eclipsed the mark held by the Chicago Cubs' Bump Wills, who hit the second pitch for a home run on April 5, 1982. Evans hit a home run on opening day four times during his career. The Red Sox went on to win the AL East, and defeated the California Angels in seven games in the 1986 ALCS; Evans batted 6-for-28 (.214) with a home run and four RBIs. Boston then lost the 1986 World Series to the New York Mets in seven games; Evans batted 8-for-26 (.308) with two home runs and nine RBIs. As recently as 2016, Evans has said publicly that he has never watched any highlight films of that World Series because the memory remains too painful for him to bear.

In 1987, at age 35, Evans recorded career highs in batting average (.305), home runs (34) and RBIs (123). He was named an All-Star for the third time of his career, won his second Silver Slugger Award, and finished fourth in MVP voting. Defensively, he started 77 games at first base, 71 games in right field, and four games as designated hitter (DH). In 1988, he batted .293 with 21 home runs and 111 RBIs, while starting 78 games in right field, 61 games at first base, and 6 games as DH. In 1989, he started 76 games in right field and 69 games at DH, while batting .285 with 20 home runs and 100 RBIs. In his final season with Boston, 1990, he started 121 games, all as DH, and batted .249 with 13 home runs and 63 RBIs. After the season ended, Evans was released by the Red Sox.

In his 19 years with Boston, Evans batted .272 with 379 home runs and 1,346 RBIs in a total of 2,505 games played. Only Carl Yastrzemski played more games for the Red Sox (3,308). Evans won eight Gold Gloves, two Silver Sluggers, and three All-Star honors.

=== Baltimore Orioles ===
Evans signed a one-year contract with the Baltimore Orioles on December 6, 1990. He batted .270 with six homers and 38 RBIs in 101 games in his only season with the Orioles. Based on his uncertain medical status, Evans was released by the Orioles in spring training on March 15, 1992.

=== Career stats ===
In his 20-year career, Evans batted .272, with 385 home runs, 1384 RBIs, 1470 runs, 2446 hits, 483 doubles, 73 triples, and 78 stolen bases in 2606 regular season games. He compiled a .986 fielding percentage. In postseason batting, Evans batted .239 with four home runs and 19 RBIs, in 32 games played. In three All-Star Game appearances, Evans batted an overall 3-for-5, and had two walks and one run scored.

Evans earned a reputation as an outfielder with one of the strongest arms in the American League. For his career, he had 157 outfield assists, including 15 in 1975, 1976 & 1979 and 14 in 1978.

== Post-playing career ==
Evans spent two seasons as an MLB hitting coach; 1994 with the Colorado Rockies, and 2002 with the Red Sox. Evans was named a Player Development Consultant for the Red Sox in 2003; as of November 2019, he was still listed in that role by the Red Sox.

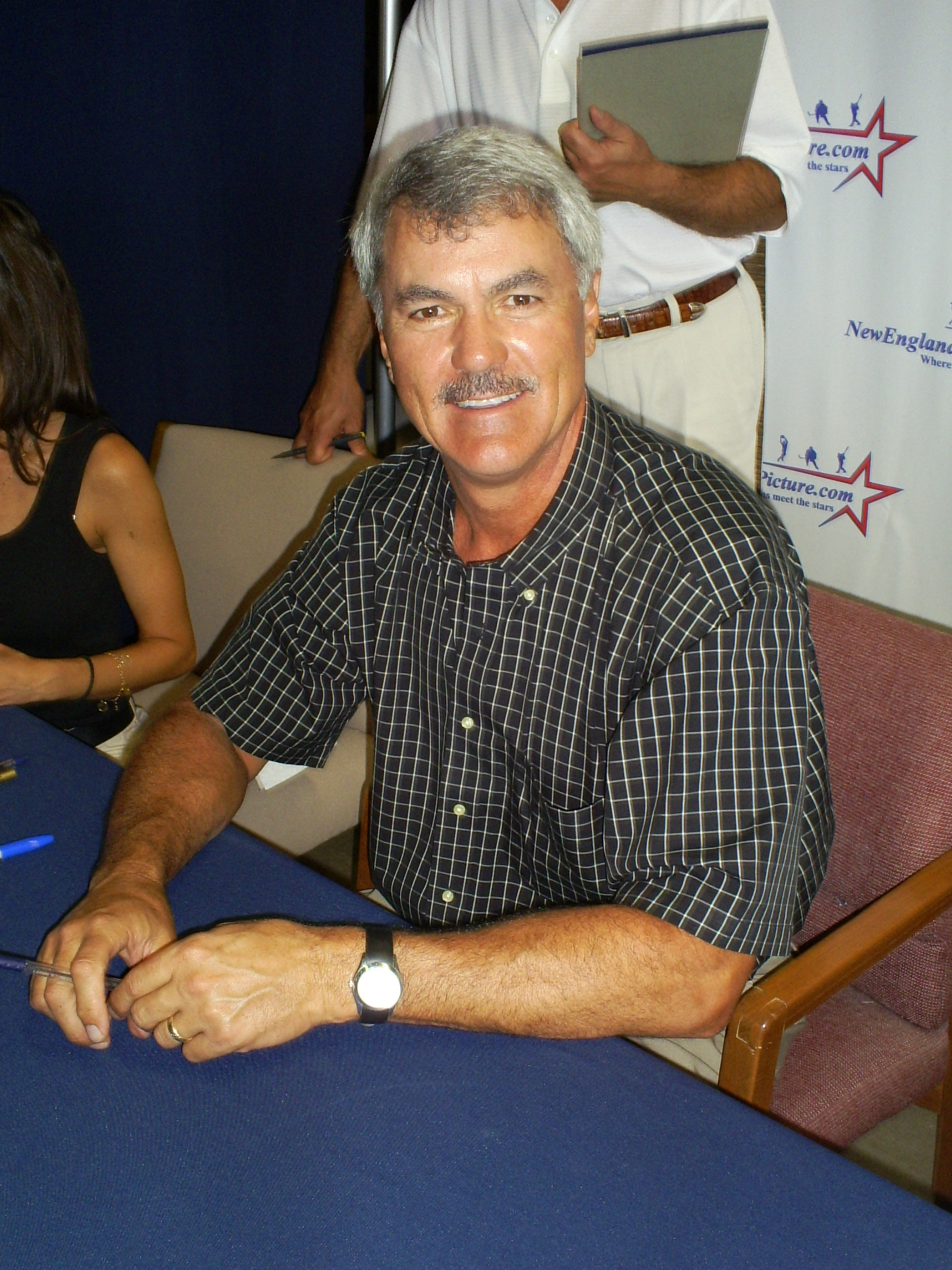
Evans signing autographs in August 2007

In 2000, Evans was inducted to the Boston Red Sox Hall of Fame.

=== Hall of Fame consideration ===
Evans was dropped from the Baseball Hall of Fame ballot when he did not receive the minimum five percent of votes in his third year of eligibility. Evans received 5.9% in 1997, 10.4% in 1998, and 3.6% in 1999. Evans' low vote total in 1999 is attributed to the appearance of future Hall of Fame players Nolan Ryan, George Brett, Robin Yount, and Carlton Fisk on the 1999 ballot. Based on his win shares metric, baseball statistician Bill James has argued that Evans is a worthy candidate for induction. In 2016, Evans commented, "I just don't understand the mentality of the voting." In November 2019, Evans was included as a Modern Baseball Era finalist as part of the 2020 Baseball Hall of Fame balloting. To gain admission to the Hall, finalists must obtain 75 percent of the votes from its 16-member Modern Baseball Era Committee; Evans received eight votes, falling short of the threshold by four votes. In January 2021, Evans was ranked 10th by Joe Posnanski of The Athletic in a listing of the 100 greatest eligible players not in the Hall of Fame.

== Personal life ==
Evans and his wife, Susan, have three children; Timothy, Kirstin, and Justin. Their youngest child, Justin, died in April 2019 at age 42 of complications from neurofibromatosis. Their son Timothy died ten months later from complications of the same disease. Evans and his wife have been long-time supporters of the non-profit organization Neurofibromatosis Northeast. Both Justin and his brother, Timothy, were diagnosed with the disease in the 1980s.

Evans' grandson, Ryan Berardino, was drafted by the Red Sox in the 34th round of the 2019 Major League Baseball draft out of Bentley University. Berardino's other grandfather is former player and coach Dick Berardino.

In 2011, Evans appeared in the Farrelly brothers film Hall Pass as Maggie's father.

== Achievements ==
- Three-time All-Star (1978, 1981, 1987)
- Eight Gold Glove Awards (1976, 1978–79, 1981–1985)
- Four Top-10 finishes in AL MVP Awards (1981–82, 1987–88)
- Led league in On-base percentage (1982)
- Led league in OPS (1981 and 1984)
- Led league in Runs and Extra-Base Hits (1984)
- Led league in Total Bases and Home Runs (1981)
- Led league in Walks (1981, 1985 and 1987)
- Led league in Runs Created (1981 and 1984)
- Led league in Times on Base (1981 and 1982)
- Hit for the cycle (1984)
- Cover of Sports Illustrated (September 26, 1988)

- Four home runs on Opening Days in his career, including one on the very first pitch of the game (April 7, 1986), which was also the first MLB game of the season, thus giving Evans the record for earliest home run hit in a season (tied by Ian Happ on March 29, 2018).
- Only player with 10+ home runs from every spot in the batting order

Records (ranked within top 100)

- 1,391 Walks (29th All-time MLB)
- 2,606 Games (41st All-time MLB)
- 941 Extra-Base Hits (55th All-time MLB)
- 3,890 Times on Base (57th All-time MLB)
- 385 Home Runs (65th All-time MLB)
- 1,570 Runs Created (68th All-time MLB)
- 4,230 Total Bases (70th All-time MLB)
- 8,996 At Bats (74th All-time MLB)
- 1,470 Runs (79th All-time MLB)
- 483 Doubles (80th All-time MLB)
- 1,384 RBI (82nd All-time MLB)
- 385 Home Runs by a right-handed batter (10th All-time AL)

Rankings updated April 26, 2019

== See also ==
- Boston Red Sox Hall of Fame
- List of Major League Baseball career home run leaders
- List of Major League Baseball career hits leaders
- List of Major League Baseball career doubles leaders
- List of Major League Baseball career runs scored leaders
- List of Major League Baseball career runs batted in leaders
- List of Major League Baseball players to hit for the cycle
- List of Major League Baseball annual home run leaders
- List of Major League Baseball annual runs scored leaders

Achievements
Preceded by Willie McGee	Hitting for the cycle June 28, 1984	Succeeded by Jeffrey Leonard
Sporting positions
Preceded by Rick Down	Red Sox Hitting Coach; 2002	Succeeded by Ron Jackson
