= 1987 Minnesota Twins season =

Major League Baseball season

1987 Minnesota Twins
- World Series champions American League champions American League West champions
- League: American League
- Division: West
- Ballpark: Hubert H. Humphrey Metrodome
- City: Minneapolis
- Record: 85–77 (.525)
- Divisional place: 1st
- Owners: Carl Pohlad
- General managers: Andy MacPhail
- Managers: Tom Kelly
- Television: KMSP-TV (John Rooney, John Gordon, Harmon Killebrew); Twinsvision (Dick Bremer, Frank Quilici)
- Radio: 830 WCCO AM (Herb Carneal, John Gordon)

The 1987 Minnesota Twins season was the 27th season for the Minnesota Twins franchise in the Twin Cities of Minnesota, their 6th season at Hubert H. Humphrey Metrodome and the 87th overall in the American League. The Twins won the World Series for the first time since moving from Washington in 1961, the second time that the franchise won the World Series (the Washington Senators won it in 1924). Having won only 85 games during the 1987 regular season, they won the World Series with the then-fewest regular season wins since Major League Baseball expanded to a 162-game season in 1961, and the fewest of any team since the 1889 New York Giants (excluding the strike-shortened 1981 and the COVID-19 pandemic-shortened 2020 seasons and later surpassed by the 2006 St. Louis Cardinals who won 83 games that season). They also became the first team to win the World Series despite being outscored by their opponents in the regular season, having scored 786 runs and allowed 806.

Tom Kelly became the fifth manager to win a World Series in his first full season on the job, and one of seven total, as of 2023, to accomplish the feat.

== Offseason ==
- November 12, 1986: The Twins traded a player to be named later to the New York Mets for Ron Gardenhire. The Twins completed the trade by sending Dominic Iasparro (minors) to the Mets on April 4, 1987. Gardenhire would spend the next 28 years in the Twins Organization including a 13-year stint as manager from 2002 to 2014.
- January 9, 1987: Juan Berenguer was signed as a free agent by the Twins.
- February 3, 1987: Neal Heaton, Yorkis Pérez, Jeff Reed and minor leaguer Al Cardwood were traded by the Twins to the Montreal Expos for Jeff Reardon and Tom Nieto.
- February 20, 1987: Minor leaguer Mike Shade was traded by the Twins to the Montreal Expos for Al Newman.
- February 24, 1987: Billy Sample was signed as a free agent by the Minnesota Twins.

== Regular season ==
The Twins were 85–77, first in the American League West, two games ahead of the Kansas City Royals. The team had one of the lowest winning percentages ever for a World Series champion, at .525. They also had the remarkably bad road record of 29-52 (.358 percentage) but made up for it winning 56 home games (best in MLB). Fortunately for the Twins, they played in a very weak division; only two teams finished above .500 and only 10 games separated the Twins from the last-place California Angels (the previous year's division champion) and Texas Rangers. The Twins' 85-77 was the lowest for a World Series champion for nearly two decades, until the 2006 St. Louis Cardinals won the World Series with an 83–78 record.

1987 was the first year the Twins started using their modernized logos and uniforms, which are still in use today.

Only one Twin made the All-Star Game, outfielder Kirby Puckett. The highest paid player was Kent Hrbek at $1,310,000; followed by Bert Blyleven at $1,150,000.

Over a late August weekend at Milwaukee, Puckett went 10 for 11, with four homers and two doubles, raising his batting average 13 points. The feat tied a major league record.

Joe Niekro, a pitcher for the Twins, was suspended for 10 games when umpire Tim Tschida discovered an emery board in his pocket. Tschida suspected Niekro was scuffing the ball, and saw the emery board fly out of Niekro's pocket. Niekro said he was filing his nails in the dugout, but American League president Dr. Bobby Brown didn't believe him, and ordered the suspension. When the Twins won the pennant, Niekro set a major league record as he'd waited 20½ years since his debut to reach a World Series game.

2,081,976 fans attended Twins games, the sixth highest total in the American League.

The Homer Hanky was introduced in 1987's pennant drive. When the Twins made the playoffs for the first time since 1970, three members of that team remained with the club now seventeen years later. Bert Blyleven was the only remaining player; Tony Oliva became the hitting coach and Rick Renick the third base coach.

=== Offense ===
This was the last year for a long time that the Twins were stocked with power hitters. In particular, Kirby Puckett, Kent Hrbek, Gary Gaetti, and Tom Brunansky combined to hit 125 home runs. (The team as a whole hit 196.) Hrbek, Gaetti, and Brunansky each surpassed 30 home runs, a number that no Twin would reach again until Justin Morneau and Torii Hunter in 2006.

Kirby Puckett led the AL with 207 hits.

Despite the power in their lineup, the Twins were outscored 806–786, one of the largest such differentials for a World Series champion.

Team Leaders
Statistic	Player	Quantity
HR	Kent Hrbek	34
RBI	Gary Gaetti	109
BA	Kirby Puckett	.332
Runs	Kirby Puckett	96

=== Pitching ===
The top three starting pitchers, Frank Viola, Bert Blyleven, and Les Straker provided stability throughout the year. Mike Smithson, Joe Niekro, and Jeff Bittiger were less reliable. Newly acquired closer Jeff Reardon was a reliable option at the end of games. Juan Berenguer was the most reliable set-up man, posting a 3.94 ERA.

Bert Blyleven led the AL with 46 home runs allowed.

Team Leaders
Statistic	Player	Quantity
ERA	Frank Viola	2.90
Wins	Frank Viola	17
Saves	Jeff Reardon	31
Strikeouts	Frank Viola	197

=== Defense ===
The defense was not as strong as would be typical for Twins teams under manager Tom Kelly. Hrbek was the most reliable fielder at first base, and the outfield of Dan Gladden, Puckett, and Brunansky was reliable. Third baseman Gary Gaetti and center fielder Kirby Puckett each won their second Gold Glove Award.

=== Season standings ===
AL West
Team	W	L	Pct.	GB	Home	Road
Minnesota Twins	85	77	.525	—	56‍–‍25	29‍–‍52
Kansas City Royals	83	79	.512	2	46‍–‍35	37‍–‍44
Oakland Athletics	81	81	.500	4	42‍–‍39	39‍–‍42
Seattle Mariners	78	84	.481	7	40‍–‍41	38‍–‍43
Chicago White Sox	77	85	.475	8	38‍–‍43	39‍–‍42
Texas Rangers	75	87	.463	10	43‍–‍38	32‍–‍49
California Angels	75	87	.463	10	38‍–‍43	37‍–‍44

=== Record vs. opponents ===
1987 American League record Sources:
Team	BAL	BOS	CAL	CWS	CLE	DET	KC	MIL	MIN	NYY	OAK	SEA	TEX	TOR
Baltimore	—	1–12	9–3	8–4	7–6	4–9	9–3	2–11	5–7	3–10	7–5	4–8	7–5	1–12
Boston	12–1	—	4–8	3–9	7–6	2–11	6–6	6–7	7–5	7–6	4–8	7–5	7–5	6–7
California	3–9	8–4	—	8–5	7–5	3–9	5–8	7–5	8–5	3–9	6–7	7–6	5–8	5–7
Chicago	4–8	9–3	5–8	—	7–5	3–9	6–7	6–6	6–7	5–7	9–4	6–7	7–6	4–8
Cleveland	6–7	6–7	5–7	5–7	—	4–9	6–6	4–9	3–9	6–7	4–8	5–7	2–10	5–8
Detroit	9–4	11–2	9–3	9–3	9–4	—	5–7	6–7	8–4	5–8	5–7	7–5	8–4	7–6
Kansas City	3–9	6–6	8–5	7–6	6–6	7–5	—	4–8	8–5	5–7	5–8	9–4	7–6	8–4
Milwaukee	11–2	7–6	5–7	6–6	9–4	7–6	8–4	—	3–9	7–6	6–6	4–8	9–3	9–4
Minnesota	7–5	5–7	5–8	7–6	9–3	4–8	5–8	9–3	—	6–6	10–3	9–4	6–7	3–9
New York	10–3	6–7	9–3	7–5	7–6	8–5	7–5	6–7	6–6	—	5–7	7–5	5–7	6–7
Oakland	5–7	8–4	7–6	4–9	8–4	7–5	8–5	6–6	3–10	7–5	—	5–8	6–7	7–5
Seattle	8–4	5–7	6–7	7–6	7–5	5–7	4–9	8–4	4–9	5–7	8–5	—	9–4	2–10
Texas	5–7	5–7	8–5	6–7	10–2	4–8	6–7	3–9	7–6	7–5	7–6	4–9	—	3–9
Toronto	12–1	7–6	7–5	8–4	8–5	6–7	4–8	4–9	9–3	7–6	5–7	10–2	9–3	—

== Game log ==
=== Regular season ===
1987 game log: 85−77 (Home: 56−25; Away: 29−52)
April: 12–9 (Home: 7–3; Away: 5–6)

#	Date	Time (CT)	Opponent	Score	Win	Loss	Save	Time of Game	Attendance	Record	Box/ Streak
1	April 7		Athletics	5–4 (10)	**Frazier** (1–0)	Krueger (0–1)	—		43,548	1–0	W1
2	April 8		Athletics	4–1	**Viola** (1–0)	Plunk (0–1)	**Reardon** (1)		12,577	2–0	W2
3	April 9		Athletics	5–4	**Berenguer** (1–0)	Howell (0–1)	—		11,586	3–0	W3
4	April 10		@ Mariners	8–1	**Smithson** (1–0)	Morgan (0–1)	—		38,122	4–0	W4
5	April 11		@ Mariners	5–6	Nunez (1–0)	**Reardon** (0–1)	—		26,312	4–1	L1
6	April 12		@ Mariners	8–5	**Blyleven** (1–0)	Langston (0–2)	**Berenguer** (1)		9,358	5–1	W1
7	April 13		@ Athletics	3–6	Howell (1–1)	**Frazier** (1–1)	—		14,447	5–2	L1
8	April 14		@ Athletics	9–8	**Atherton** (1–0)	Codiroli (0–1)	**Reardon** (2)		10,435	6–2	W1
9	April 15		@ Athletics	5–2	**Smithson** (2–0)	Stewart (0–2)	**Reardon** (3)		17,182	7–2	W2
10	April 17		@ Angels	1–2	Witt (2–1)	**Blyleven** (1–1)	—		36,175	7–3	L1
11	April 18		@ Angels	0–1	Candelaria (2–0)	**Viola** (1–1)	Moore (2)		36,881	7–4	L2
12	April 19		@ Angels	6–5	**Portugal** (1–0)	Sutton (0–3)	**Reardon** (4)		49,627	8–4	W1
13	April 20		Mariners	13–5	**Smithson** (3–0)	Morgan (0–3)	—		11,927	9–4	W2
14	April 21		Mariners	6–1	**Straker** (1–0)	Trujillo (1–1)	—		10,776	10–4	W3
15	April 22		Mariners	3–4	Langston (2–2)	**Frazier** (1–2)	—		11,247	10–5	L1
16	April 23		Angels	3–7	Candelaria (3–0)	**Viola** (1–2)	Moore (3)		14,204	10–6	L2
17	April 24		Angels	1–8	Sutton (1–3)	**Portugal** (1–1)	—		20,116	10–7	L3
18	April 25		Angels	8–7	**Reardon** (1–1)	Finley (0–1)	—		51,717	11–7	W1
19	April 26		Angels	10–5	**Frazier** (2–2)	Cook (1–1)	—		19,116	12–7	W2
20	April 28		@ Blue Jays	1–5	Clancy (2–2)	**Viola** (1–3)	—		21,182	12–8	L1
21	April 29		@ Blue Jays	1–8	Johnson (1–2)	**Smithson** (3–1)	—		19,020	12–9	L2

May: 14–14 (Home: 9–8; Away: 5–6)

#	Date	Time (CT)	Opponent	Score	Win	Loss	Save	Time of Game	Attendance	Record	Box/ Streak
22	May 1		Yankees	7–4	**Blyleven** (2–1)	Rhoden (2–3)	**Reardon** (5)		23,531	13–9	W1
23	May 2		Yankees	4–6	John (2–0)	**Viola** (1–4)	Righetti (7)		33,173	13–10	L1
24	May 3		Yankees	4–3	**Frazier** (3–2)	Stoddard (0–1)	**Reardon** (6)		23,798	14–10	W1
25	May 5		Orioles	4–5	Bell (3–1)	**Smithson** (3–2)	Dixon (1)		8,891	14–11	L1
26	May 6		Orioles	0–6	McGregor (1–4)	**Blyleven** (2–2)	—		10,840	14–12	L2
27	May 7		Orioles	5–2	**Viola** (2–4)	Flanagan (0–5)	**Reardon** (7)		14,198	15–12	W1
28	May 8		@ Yankees	7–11	Guante (2–1)	**Reardon** (1–2)	—		25,921	15–13	L1
29	May 9		@ Yankees	2–0	**Straker** (2–0)	Rasmussen (2–2)	**Reardon** (8)		27,220	16–13	W1
30	May 10		@ Yankees	1–6	Hudson (5–0)	**Smithson** (3–3)	—		41,691	16–14	L1
31	May 11		@ Orioles	10–4	**Blyleven** (3–2)	McGregor (1–5)	—		25,353	17–14	W1
32	May 12		@ Orioles	7–10	Dixon (3–2)	**Reardon** (1–3)	—		14,279	17–15	L1
33	May 13		Blue Jays	0–7	Clancy (5–2)	**Portugal** (1–2)	—		9,158	17–16	L2
34	May 14		Blue Jays	4–16	Stieb (2–2)	**Straker** (2–1)	—		10,053	17–17	L3
35	May 15		Red Sox	3–1	**Frazier** (4–2)	Hurst (4–4)	—		13,878	18–17	W1
36	May 16		Red Sox	1–6	Clemens (3–3)	**Blyleven** (3–3)	—		23,414	18–18	L1
37	May 17		Red Sox	10–8 (10)	**Atherton** (2–0)	Schiraldi (1–3)	—		20,716	19–18	W1
38	May 19		@ Indians	3–4	Schrom (3–4)	**Portugal** (1–3)	—		7,045	19–19	L1
39	May 20		@ Indians	8–2	**Berenguer** (2–0)	Candiotti (1–6)	—		6,226	20–19	W1
40	May 21		@ Indians	3–6	Swindell (3–3)	**Blyleven** (3–4)	—		7,401	20–20	L1
41	May 22	7:05 p.m. CDT	Tigers	2–3	Morris (5–2)	**Viola** (2–5)	—	2:43	15,423	20–21	L2
42	May 23	7:05 p.m. CDT	Tigers	7–5	**Anderson** (1–0)	Terrell (3–5)	**Reardon** (9)	3:10	18,601	21–21	W1
43	May 24	1:15 p.m. CDT	Tigers	2–7	Robinson (3–2)	**Atherton** (2–1)	—	3:07	16,351	21–22	L1
44	May 26		Brewers	4–2	**Blyleven** (4–4)	Nieves (3–2)	**Reardon** (10)		23,276	22–22	W1
45	May 27		Brewers	7–2	**Viola** (3–5)	Wegman (3–5)	**Frazier** (1)		22,947	23–22	W2
46	May 28		Brewers	13–1	**Berenguer** (3–0)	Birkbeck (1–4)	—		26,203	24–22	W3
47	May 29	6:35 p.m. CDT	@ Tigers	7–15	Terrell (4–5)	**Straker** (2–2)	—	2:28	19,031	24–23	L1
—	May 30		@ Tigers	**Postponed (rain)** (Rescheduled May 31)							
48	May 31 (1)	12:35 p.m. CDT	@ Tigers	9–5	**Reardon** (2–3)	King (2–4)	—	3:25	n/a	25–23	W1
49	May 31 (2)	4:30 p.m. CDT	@ Tigers	11–3	**Frazier** (5–2)	Tanana (4–3)	—	2:56	20,993	26–23	W2

June: 17–11 (Home: 10–2; Away: 7–9)

#	Date	Time (CT)	Opponent	Score	Win	Loss	Save	Time of Game	Attendance	Record	Box/ Streak
50	June 1		@ Red Sox	9–5	**Viola** (4–5)	Clemens (4–5)	—		20,221	27–23	W3
51	June 2		@ Red Sox	5–6	Schiraldi (3–3)	**Reardon** (2–4)	—		16,910	27–24	L1
52	June 3		@ Red Sox	6–7 (10)	Schiraldi (4–3)	**Klink** (0–1)	—		20,638	27–25	L2
53	June 5		Rangers	9–15	Harris (2–4)	**Blyleven** (4–5)	—		16,092	27–26	L3
54	June 6		Rangers	3–2 (13)	**Atherton** (3–1)	Williams (3–3)	—		24,992	28–26	W1
55	June 7		Rangers	7–4	**Atherton** (4–1)	Russell (0–1)	—		15,795	29–26	W2
56	June 8	7:05 p.m. CDT	Royals	5–3	**Niemann** (1–0)	Gubicza (3–7)	**Reardon** (11)	2:35	17,815	30–26	W3
57	June 9	7:05 p.m. CDT	Royals	5–2	**Niekro** (1–0)	Jackson (2–8)	**Atherton** (1)	3:00	18,563	31–26	W4
58	June 10	7:05 p.m. CDT	Royals	4–3 (10)	**Reardon** (3–4)	Gleaton (1–2)	—	3:04	18,560	32–26	W5
—	June 11		@ White Sox	**Postponed (rain)** (Rescheduled June 12)							
59	June 12 (1)		@ White Sox	5–2	**Viola** (5–5)	Long (3–2)	**Reardon** (12)		n/a	33–26	W6
60	June 12 (2)		@ White Sox	7–4	**Berenguer** (4–0)	Nielsen (0–1)	**Atherton** (2)		18,906	34–26	W7
61	June 13		@ White Sox	2–6	Dotson (4–4)	**Straker** (2–3)	James (8)		28,087	34–27	L1
62	June 14		@ White Sox	6–3	**Niekro** (2–0)	DeLeon (4–6)	**Berenguer** (2)		17,334	35–27	W1
63	June 15		@ Brewers	5–0	**Blyleven** (5–5)	Wegman (5–6)	—		18,403	36–27	W2
64	June 16		@ Brewers	7–3	**Viola** (6–5)	Crim (3–4)	**Reardon** (13)		21,613	37–27	W3
65	June 17		@ Brewers	5–8	Clear (5–1)	**Straker** (2–4)	Plesac (14)		23,389	37–28	L1
66	June 19		White Sox	7–6	**Reardon** (4–4)	Winn (2–3)	—		24,123	38–28	W1
67	June 20		White Sox	5–10	DeLeon (5–6)	**Blyleven** (5–6)	—		33,636	38–29	L1
68	June 21		White Sox	8–6	**Berenguer** (5–0)	Winn (2–4)	**Reardon** (14)		29,240	39–29	W1
69	June 23		Indians	9–4	**Smithson** (4–3)	Candiotti (2–8)	**Frazier** (2)		17,393	40–29	W2
70	June 24		Indians	14–8	**Straker** (3–4)	Swindell (3–7)	—		19,885	41–29	W3
71	June 25		Indians	4–3	**Blyleven** (6–6)	Niekro (5–7)	**Reardon** (15)		27,489	42–29	W4
72	June 26		@ Rangers	0–1	Witt (3–3)	**Viola** (6–6)	Mohorcic (10)		20,605	42–30	L1
73	June 27 (1)		@ Rangers	6–11	Correa (3–5)	**Frazier** (5–3)	Russell (2)		n/a	42–31	L2
74	June 27 (2)		@ Rangers	2–7	Hough (8–3)	**Atherton** (4–2)	—		35,677	42–32	L3
75	June 28		@ Rangers	3–6	Guzman (6–6)	**Smithson** (4–4)	Mohorcic (11)		17,477	42–33	L4
76	June 29	7:35 p.m. CDT	@ Royals	2–3 (5)	Jackson (4–10)	**Straker** (3–5)	—	1:22	35,872	42–34	L5
77	June 30	7:35 p.m. CDT	@ Royals	3–1	**Blyleven** (7–6)	Leibrandt (8–6)	**Reardon** (16)	2:44	21,515	43–34	W1

July: 13–14 (Home: 7–3; Away: 6–11)

#	Date	Time (CT)	Opponent	Score	Win	Loss	Save	Time of Game	Attendance	Record	Box/ Streak
78	July 1	7:35 p.m. CDT	@ Royals	3–4	Quisenberry (3–0)	**Atherton** (4–3)	—	2:59	26,899	43–35	L1
79	July 2	7:35 p.m. CDT	@ Royals	3–10	Saberhagen (14–2)	**Niekro** (2–1)	—	2:42	35,992	43–36	L2
80	July 3		Orioles	6–5 (11)	**Reardon** (5–4)	Niedenfuer (1–1)	—		26,331	44–36	W1
81	July 4		Orioles	4–1	**Straker** (4–5)	Bell (6–6)	**Berenguer** (3)		23,724	45–36	W2
82	July 5		Orioles	4–3	**Blyleven** (8–6)	Niedenfuer (1–2)	—		21,294	46–36	W3
83	July 6		@ Yankees	2–0	**Viola** (7–6)	Guidry (1–4)	—		20,141	47–36	W4
84	July 7		@ Yankees	7–12	Stoddard (2–1)	**Atherton** (4–4)	—		27,697	47–37	L1
85	July 8		@ Yankees	4–13	Rhoden (11–5)	**Smithson** (4–5)	Clements (4)		38,168	47–38	L2
86	July 9		@ Orioles	3–1	**Straker** (5–5)	Bell (6–7)	**Reardon** (17)		22,656	48–38	W1
87	July 10		@ Orioles	12–13	Williamson (3–6)	**Frazier** (5–4)	—		28,057	48–39	L1
88	July 11		@ Orioles	2–1	**Viola** (8–6)	Griffin (1–3)	—		25,690	49–39	W1
89	July 12		@ Orioles	0–5	Schmidt (9–2)	**Niekro** (2–2)	—		27,486	49–40	L1
**58th All-Star Game in Oakland, California**
90	July 16		Blue Jays	2–5	Key (10–6)	**Blyleven** (8–7)	Henke (18)		34,334	49–41	L2
91	July 17		Blue Jays	3–2	**Viola** (9–6)	Eichhorn (8–5)	**Reardon** (18)		28,234	50–41	W1
92	July 18		Blue Jays	5–7	Stieb (8–5)	**Niekro** (2–3)	—		38,365	50–42	L1
93	July 19		Blue Jays	7–6	**Schatzeder** (1–0)	Lavelle (1–1)	**Reardon** (19)		32,095	51–42	W1
94	July 20		Yankees	1–7	John (9–3)	**Straker** (5–6)	—		34,966	51–43	L1
95	July 21		Yankees	2–1	**Blyleven** (9–7)	Stoddard (2–2)	—		37,391	52–43	W1
96	July 22		Yankees	3–1	**Viola** (10–6)	Rhoden (12–6)	**Reardon** (20)		40,054	53–43	W2
97	July 23		@ Blue Jays	3–4	Stieb (9–5)	**Frazier** (5–5)	—		35,320	53–44	L1
98	July 24		@ Blue Jays	6–8	Eichhorn (9–5)	**Reardon** (5–5)	Henke (20)		30,382	53–45	L2
99	July 25		@ Blue Jays	13–9	**Schatzeder** (2–0)	Musselman (7–4)	—		36,395	54–45	W1
100	July 26		@ Blue Jays	2–4	Key (11–6)	**Blyleven** (9–8)	Henke (21)		33,393	54–46	L1
101	July 27		@ Mariners	4–3	**Viola** (11–6)	Nunez (3–2)	**Reardon** (21)		13,858	55–46	W1
102	July 28		@ Mariners	1–6	Morgan (8–11)	**Niekro** (2–4)	—		13,495	55–47	L1
103	July 29		@ Mariners	3–8	Guetterman (9–2)	**Smithson** (4–6)	—		14,320	55–48	L2
104	July 31		@ Athletics	5–3	**Blyleven** (10–8)	Lamp (1–2)	**Reardon** (22)		32,097	56–48	W1

August: 13–15 (Home: 10–4; Away: 3–11)

#	Date	Time (CT)	Opponent	Score	Win	Loss	Save	Time of Game	Attendance	Record	Box/ Streak
105	August 1		@ Athletics	2–3	Stewart (14–7)	**Viola** (11–7)	—		40,929	56–49	L1
106	August 2		@ Athletics	5–6 (11)	Nelson (5–2)	**Reardon** (5–6)	—		33,215	56–50	L2
107	August 3		@ Angels	11–3	**Schatzeder** (3–0)	Witt (13–7)	—		33,983	57–50	W1
108	August 4		@ Angels	3–12	Sutton (8–9)	**Carlton** (0–1)	Lucas (2)		37,371	57–51	L1
109	August 5		@ Angels	1–6	Candelaria (6–3)	**Blyleven** (10–9)	—		34,059	57–52	L2
110	August 6		Athletics	9–4	**Viola** (12–7)	Stewart (14–8)	—		39,177	58–52	W1
111	August 7		Athletics	9–4	**Niekro** (3–4)	Lamp (1–3)	—		36,146	59–52	W2
112	August 8		Athletics	9–2	**Carlton** (1–1)	Young (10–6)	—		50,237	60–52	W3
113	August 9		Athletics	7–5	**Blyleven** (11–9)	Ontiveros (6–6)	**Reardon** (23)		33,948	61–52	W4
114	August 11		Angels	7–2	**Viola** (13–7)	Candelaria (6–4)	—		39,163	62–52	W5
115	August 12		Angels	2–8	McCaskill (3–4)	**Straker** (5–7)	—		33,033	62–53	L1
116	August 13		Angels	1–5	Witt (14–8)	**Carlton** (1–2)	—		35,837	62–54	L2
117	August 14		Mariners	6–3	**Blyleven** (12–9)	Morgan (10–12)	—		26,291	63–54	W1
118	August 15		Mariners	14–4	**Smith** (1–0)	Guetterman (9–4)	—		31,154	64–54	W2
119	August 16		Mariners	5–1	**Viola** (14–7)	Moore (5–15)	—		28,006	65–54	W3
120	August 17		Mariners	4–2	**Straker** (6–7)	Langston (13–10)	**Reardon** (24)		29,623	66–54	W4
121	August 18	6:35 p.m. CDT	@ Tigers	2–11	Morris (14–6)	**Carlton** (1–3)	—	2:36	32,053	66–55	L1
122	August 19	6:35 p.m. CDT	@ Tigers	1–7	Terrell (10–10)	**Blyleven** (12–10)	—	2:12	38,163	66–56	L2
123	August 20	12:35 p.m. CDT	@ Tigers	0–8	Alexander (1–0)	**Niekro** (3–5)	—	2:46	45,804	66–57	L3
124	August 21		@ Red Sox	3–11	Clemens (13–7)	**Viola** (14–8)	Gardner (5)		33,490	66–58	L4
125	August 22		@ Red Sox	5–6	Schiraldi (8–5)	**Straker** (6–8)	—		29,794	66–59	L5
126	August 23		@ Red Sox	4–6	Sellers (5–6)	**Carlton** (1–4)	Gardner (6)		32,956	66–60	L6
127	August 24	7:05 p.m. CDT	Tigers	5–4	**Reardon** (6–6)	King (6–9)	—	3:07	27,338	67–60	W1
128	August 25	7:05 p.m. CDT	Tigers	4–5	Alexander (2–0)	**Niekro** (3–6)	Henneman (4)	2:52	30,639	67–61	L1
129	August 26	7:05 p.m. CDT	Tigers	8–10	Petry (8–6)	**Reardon** (6–7)	Hernández (7)	3:29	29,265	67–62	L2
130	August 28		@ Brewers	0–1	Bosio (8–5)	**Straker** (6–9)	—		22,461	67–63	L3
131	August 29		@ Brewers	12–3	**Blyleven** (13–10)	Barker (2–1)	—		34,834	68–63	W1
132	August 30		@ Brewers	10–6	**Atherton** (5–4)	Crim (5–6)	**Reardon** (25)		22,417	69—63	W2

September: 16–11 (Home: 13–5; Away: 3–6)

#	Date	Time (CT)	Opponent	Score	Win	Loss	Save	Time of Game	Attendance	Record	Box/ Streak
133	September 1		Red Sox	0–9	Sellers (6–6)	**Niekro** (3–7)	—		25,508	69–64	L1
134	September 2		Red Sox	5–4	**Straker** (7–9)	Nipper (8–11)	**Reardon** (26)		19,565	70–64	W1
135	September 3		Red Sox	2–1 (10)	**Atherton** (6–4)	Gardner (1–6)	—		20,009	71–64	W2
136	September 4		Brewers	2–1 (12)	**Berenguer** (6–0)	Plesac (5–5)	—		27,380	72–64	W3
137	September 5		Brewers	2–1	**Atherton** (7–4)	Crim (5–7)	—		51,122	73–64	W4
138	September 6		Brewers	0–6	Higuera (15–9)	**Carlton** (1–5)	—		36,586	73–65	L1
139	September 7		White Sox	8–1	**Bittiger** (1–0)	LaPoint (3–3)	—		22,623	74–65	W1
140	September 8		White Sox	3–4	Bannister (12–10)	**Blyleven** (13–11)	Thigpen (9)		12,360	74–66	L1
141	September 9		White Sox	2–1	**Viola** (15–8)	Winn (4–6)	—		15,394	75–66	W1
142	September 11		@ Indians	13–10 (11)	**Reardon** (7–7)	Gordon (0–3)	**Berenguer** (4)		7,964	76–66	W2
143	September 12		@ Indians	4–5	Jones (4–4)	**Berenguer** (6–1)	—		9,156	76–67	L1
144	September 13		@ Indians	7–3 (10)	**Reardon** (8–7)	Candiotti (7–16)	—		7,474	77–67	W1
145	September 14		@ White Sox	2–8	LaPoint (4–3)	**Viola** (15–9)	—		7,898	77–68	L1
146	September 15		@ White Sox	2–6	McDowell (1–0)	**Niekro** (3–8)	—		7,947	77–69	L2
147	September 16		@ White Sox	10–13	DeLeon (10–12)	**Smithson** (4–7)	Thigpen (11)		8,921	77–70	L3
148	September 18		Indians	9–4	**Blyleven** (14–11)	Akerfelds (2–5)	—		23,173	78–70	W1
149	September 19		Indians	3–1	**Viola** (16–9)	Candiotti (7–17)	**Reardon** (27)		23,581	79–70	W2
150	September 20		Indians	3–2	**Straker** (8–9)	Yett (3–8)	**Reardon** (28)		18,906	80–70	W3
151	September 22		Rangers	6–4	**Niekro** (4–8)	Harris (5–10)	**Reardon** (29)		18,294	81–70	W4
152	September 23		Rangers	4–2	**Berenguer** (7–1)	Guzman (14–12)	**Reardon** (30)		20,640	82–70	W5
153	September 24		Rangers	4–0	**Viola** (17–9)	Hough (17–12)	—		23,496	83–70	W6
154	September 25	7:05 p.m. CDT	Royals	4–6	Farr (4–3)	**Schatzeder** (3–1)	Garber (6)	3:07	52,704	83–71	L1
155	September 26	11:00 a.m. CDT	Royals	4–7	Davis (5–2)	**Reardon** (8–8)	Garber (7)	3:04	46,263	83–72	L2
156	September 27	1:15 p.m. CDT	Royals	8–1	**Blyleven** (15–11)	Leibrandt (15–11)	—	2:12	53,106	84–72	W1
157	September 28		@ Rangers	5–3	**Berenguer** (8–1)	Guzman (14–13)	**Reardon** (31)		9,986	85–72	W2
158	September 29		@ Rangers	5–7	Hough (18–12)	**Atherton** (7–5)	—		10,328	85–73	L1
159	September 30		@ Rangers	1–2	Witt (8–10)	**Straker** (8–10)	—		9,309	85–74	L2

October: 0–3 (Home: 0–0; Away: 0–3)

#	Date	Time (CT)	Opponent	Score	Win	Loss	Save	Time of Game	Attendance	Record	Box/ Streak
160	October 2	7:35 p.m. CDT	@ Royals	3–6	Saberhagen (18–10)	**Viola** (17–10)	—	2:23	22,578	85–75	L3
161	October 3	7:05 p.m. CDT	@ Royals	2–4	Leibrandt (16–11)	**Blyleven** (15–12)	Garber (8)	2:18	28,082	85–76	L4
162	October 4	1:35 p.m. CDT	@ Royals	1–10	Gubicza (13–18)	**Niekro** (4–9)	—	2:24	26,341	85–77	L5

Legend: = Win = Loss = Postponement
Bold = Twins team member

=== Postseason Game log ===
1987 Postseason game log: 8−4 (Home 6−0; Away 2−4)
AL Championship Series: vs. Detroit Tigers: 4−1 (Home: 2–0; Away: 2–1)

#	Date	Time (CT)	Opponent	Score	Win	Loss	Save	Time of Game	Attendance	Series	Box/ Streak
1	October 7	7:28 p.m. CDT	Tigers	8–5	**Reardon** (1–0)	Alexander (0–1)	—	2:46	53,269	MIN 1–0	W1
2	October 8	7:38 p.m. CDT	Tigers	6–3	**Blyleven** (1–0)	Morris (0–1)	**Berenguer** (1)	2:54	55,245	MIN 2–0	W2
3	October 10	12:10 p.m. CDT	@ Tigers	6–7	Henneman (1–0)	**Reardon** (1–1)	—	3:29	49,730	MIN 2–1	L1
4	October 11	7:23 p.m. CDT	@ Tigers	5–3	**Viola** (1–0)	Tanana (0–1)	**Reardon** (1)	3:24	51,939	MIN 3–1	W1
5	October 12	2:07 p.m. CDT	@ Tigers	9–5	**Blyleven** (2–0)	Alexander (0–2)	**Reardon** (2)	3:14	47,448	MIN 4–1	W2

World Series: vs. St. Louis Cardinals: 4−3 (Home: 4–0; Away: 0–3)

#	Date	Time (CT)	Opponent	Score	Win	Loss	Save	Time of Game	Attendance	Series	Box/ Streak
1	October 17	7:35 p.m. CDT	Cardinals	10–1	**Viola** (1–0)	Magrane (0–1)	—	2:39	55,171	MIN 1–0	W1
2	October 18	7:25 p.m. CDT	Cardinals	8–4	**Blyleven** (1–0)	Cox (0–1)	—	2:42	55,257	MIN 2–0	W2
3	October 20	7:33 p.m. CDT	@ Cardinals	1–3	Tudor (1–0)	**Berenguer** (0–1)	Worrell (1)	2:45	55,347	MIN 2–1	L1
4	October 21	7:29 p.m. CDT	@ Cardinals	2–7	Forsch (1–0)	**Viola** (1–1)	Dayley (1)	3:11	55,347	Tied 2–2	L2
5	October 22	7:42 p.m. CDT	@ Cardinals	2–4	Cox (1–1)	**Blyleven** (1–1)	Worrell (2)	3:21	55,347	STL 3–2	L3
6	October 24	3:00 p.m. CDT	Cardinals	11–5	**Schatzeder** (1–0)	Tudor (1–1)	—	3:22	55,293	Tied 3–3	W1
7	October 25	7:26 p.m. CST	Cardinals	4–2	**Viola** (2–1)	Cox (1–2)	**Reardon** (1)	3:04	55,376	MIN 4–3	W2

Legend: = Win = Loss = Postponement
Bold = Twins team member

=== Notable transactions ===
- March 31, 1987: Minor leaguers Jose Dominguez and Ray Velázquez and a player to be named later were traded by the Twins to the San Francisco Giants for outfielder Dan Gladden and minor leaguer David Blakely. The Twins completed the deal by sending Bryan Hickerson to the Giants on June 15.
- May 10, 1987: Bill Latham was traded by the Twins to the New York Mets for Jayson Felice (minors).
- May 22, 1987: Sal Butera was signed as a free agent by the Twins.
- June 2, 1987: 1987 Major League Baseball draft
  - Willie Banks was drafted by the Twins in the 1st round (3rd pick overall).
  - Terry Jorgensen was drafted by the Twins in the 2nd round.
  - Larry Casian was drafted by the Twins in the 6th round.
  - Mark Guthrie was drafted by the Twins in the 7th round.
  - Chip Hale was drafted by the Twins in the 17th round
  - Bret Boone was drafted by the Twins in the 28th round, but did not sign.
  - Craig Paquette was drafted by the Twins in the 36th round, but did not sign.
- June 2, 1987: Eric Bullock was traded by the Houston Astros to the Minnesota Twins for Clay Christiansen.
- June 7, 1987: Mark Salas was traded by the Twins to the New York Yankees for pitcher Joe Niekro.
- June 24, 1987: Danny Clay and Tom Schwarz (minors) were traded by the Twins to the Philadelphia Phillies for Dan Schatzeder and cash.
- July 31: The Twins traded a player to be named later to the Cleveland Indians for Steve Carlton. The Twins completed the trade by sending minor leaguer Jeff Perry to the Indians on August 18.
- September 1: The Twins traded a player to be named later to the Boston Red Sox for designated hitter Don Baylor. The Twins completed the deal by sending minor leaguer Enrique Rios to the Red Sox on December 18.

=== Opening Day Lineup ===
Opening Day Starters
#	Name	Position
32	Dan Gladden	DH
4	Steve Lombardozzi	2B
34	Kirby Puckett	CF
8	Gary Gaetti	3B
14	Kent Hrbek	1B
24	Tom Brunansky	RF
27	Mark Davidson	LF
7	Greg Gagne	SS
11	Tom Nieto	C
28	Bert Blyleven	P

=== Roster ===
1987 Minnesota Twins
**Roster**
**Pitchers**: 49 Allan Anderson; 22 Keith Atherton; 40 Juan Berenguer; 30 Jeff Bittiger; 28 Bert Blyleven; 38 Steve Carlton; 21 George Frazier; 46 Joe Klink; 36 Joe Niekro; 19 Randy Niemann; 36 Mark Portugal; 41 Jeff Reardon; 31 Dan Schatzeder; 23 Roy Smith; 48 Mike Smithson; 17 Les Straker; 16 Frank Viola	**Catchers**: 33 Sal Butera; 15 Tim Laudner; 11 Tom Nieto; 12 Mark Salas; **Infielders**: 8 Gary Gaetti; 7 Greg Gagne; 14 Kent Hrbek; 9 Gene Larkin; 4 Steve Lombardozzi; 26 Al Newman; 2 Chris Pittaro; 5 Roy Smalley	**Outfielders**: 20 Billy Beane; 24 Tom Brunansky; 25 Randy Bush; 27 Mark Davidson; 32 Dan Gladden; 34 Kirby Puckett; **Other batters**: 18 Don Baylor	**Manager**: 10 Tom Kelly; **Coaches**: 6 Tony Oliva (Hitting); 44 Rick Renick (Third base); 43 Rick Stelmaszek (Bullpen); 42 Dick Such (Pitching); 45 Wayne Terwilliger (First base)

== Player stats ==
= Indicates team leader

= Indicates league leader

=== Batting ===
==== Starters by position ====
Note: Pos = Position; G = Games played; AB = At bats; H = Hits; Avg. = Batting average; HR = Home runs; RBI = Runs batted in

Pos	Player	G	AB	H	Avg.	HR	RBI
C	Tim Laudner	113	288	55	.191	16	43
1B	Kent Hrbek	143	477	136	.285	34	90
2B	Steve Lombardozzi	136	432	103	.238	8	38
3B	Gary Gaetti	154	584	150	.257	31	109
SS	Greg Gagne	137	437	116	.265	10	40
LF	Dan Gladden	121	438	109	.249	8	38
CF	Kirby Puckett	157	624	207	.332	28	99
RF	Tom Brunansky	155	532	138	.259	32	85
DH	Roy Smalley	110	309	85	.275	8	34

==== Other batters ====
Note: G = Games played; AB = At bats; H = Hits; Avg. = Batting average; HR = Home runs; RBI = Runs batted in

Player	G	AB	H	Avg.	HR	RBI
Al Newman	110	307	68	.221	0	29
Randy Bush	122	293	74	.253	11	46
Gene Larkin	85	233	62	.266	4	28
Mark Davidson	102	150	40	.267	1	14
Sal Butera	51	111	19	.171	1	12
Tom Nieto	41	105	21	.200	1	12
Don Baylor	20	49	14	.286	0	6
Mark Salas	22	45	17	.378	3	9
Billy Beane	12	15	4	.267	0	1
Chris Pittaro	14	12	4	.333	0	0

=== Pitching ===
==== Starting pitchers ====
Note: G = Games pitched; IP = Innings pitched; W = Wins; L = Losses; ERA = Earned run average; SO = Strikeouts

Player	G	IP	W	L	ERA	SO
Bert Blyleven	37	267.0	15	12	4.01	196
Frank Viola	36	251.2	17	10	2.90	197
Les Straker	31	154.1	8	10	4.37	76
Mike Smithson	21	109.0	4	7	5.94	53
Joe Niekro	19	96.1	4	9	6.26	54

==== Other pitchers ====
Note: G = Games pitched; IP = Innings pitched; W = Wins; L = Losses; ERA = Earned run average; SO = Strikeouts

Player	G	IP	W	L	ERA	SO
Mark Portugal	13	44.0	1	3	7.77	28
Steve Carlton	9	43.0	1	5	6.70	20
Joe Klink	12	23.0	0	1	6.65	17
Roy Smith	7	16.1	1	0	4.96	8
Allan Anderson	4	12.1	1	0	10.95	3
Jeff Bittiger	3	8.1	1	0	5.40	5

==== Relief pitchers ====
Note: G = Games pitched; W = Wins; L = Losses; SV = Saves; ERA = Earned run average; SO = Strikeouts

Player	G	W	L	SV	ERA	SO
Jeff Reardon	63	8	8	31	4.48	83
Juan Berenguer	47	8	1	4	3.94	110
Keith Atherton	59	7	5	2	4.54	51
George Frazier	54	5	5	2	4.98	58
Dan Schatzeder	30	3	1	0	6.39	30
Randy Niemann	6	1	0	0	8.44	1

== Postseason ==
See 1987 American League Championship Series and 1987 World Series.

The Twins won the American League Championship Series beating the Detroit Tigers 4 games to 1. Gary Gaetti was named the ALCS MVP. He'd set a record by homering in his first two post-season at-bats. The Twins won the series by winning two of the three road games at Detroit despite a 4–8 regular season record vs the Tigers as well as 29 regular season wins on the road.

The Twins won all four home games to top the St. Louis Cardinals in the World Series. Frank Viola was named the Series' MVP even though it was the Twins bats that were instrumental in the first three wins outscoring St. Louis 29–10 in the process.

== Farm system ==
Level	Team	League	Manager
AAA	Portland Beavers	Pacific Coast League	Charlie Manuel
AA	Orlando Twins	Southern League	George Mitterwald
A	Visalia Oaks	California League	Danny Schmitz
A	Kenosha Twins	Midwest League	Don Leppert
Rookie	Elizabethton Twins	Appalachian League	Ray Smith

LEAGUE CHAMPIONS: Kenosha
