= 1987 Oakland Athletics season =

1987 Oakland Athletics
- League: American League
- Division: West
- Ballpark: Oakland–Alameda County Coliseum
- City: Oakland, California
- Record: 81–81 (.500)
- Divisional place: 3rd
- Owners: Walter A. Haas, Jr.
- General managers: Sandy Alderson
- Managers: Tony La Russa
- Television: KPIX (Bill King, Lon Simmons, Ray Fosse)
- Radio: KSFO (Bill King, Lon Simmons, Ted Robinson, Joe Fonzi)

The 1987 Oakland Athletics season was the 87th season for the Oakland Athletics franchise, all as members of the American League, and their 20th season in Oakland. The Athletics finished third in the American League West with a record of 81 wins and 81 losses. Mark McGwire set a rookie record by hitting 49 home runs. At the beginning of the season, the word "Athletics" returned, in script lettering, to the front of the team's jerseys. Former A's owner, Charles O. Finley banned the word "Athletics" from the club's name in the past because he felt that name was too closely associated with former Philadelphia Athletics owner Connie Mack. In his first full Major League season, Mark McGwire hit 49 home runs, a single-season record for a rookie; he was named the American League Rookie of the Year. McGwire would be the first American League rookie since Al Rosen of the Cleveland Indians in 1950 to lead the American League in home runs. The 1987 season also saw the return of Reggie Jackson to Oakland.

== Offseason ==
- December 11, 1986: Donnie Hill was traded by the Athletics to the Chicago White Sox for Gene Nelson and Bruce Tanner.
- January 20, 1987: Vida Blue was signed as a free agent by the Athletics.
- January 22, 1987: Jim Eppard was purchased from the Athletics by the California Angels.
- February 6, 1987: Johnnie LeMaster was signed as a free agent with the Oakland Athletics.
- February 23, 1987: Jeff Kaiser was traded by the Athletics to the Cleveland Indians for Curt Wardle.

== Regular season ==
=== Season standings ===
AL West
Team	W	L	Pct.	GB	Home	Road
Minnesota Twins	85	77	.525	—	56‍–‍25	29‍–‍52
Kansas City Royals	83	79	.512	2	46‍–‍35	37‍–‍44
Oakland Athletics	81	81	.500	4	42‍–‍39	39‍–‍42
Seattle Mariners	78	84	.481	7	40‍–‍41	38‍–‍43
Chicago White Sox	77	85	.475	8	38‍–‍43	39‍–‍42
Texas Rangers	75	87	.463	10	43‍–‍38	32‍–‍49
California Angels	75	87	.463	10	38‍–‍43	37‍–‍44

=== Record vs. opponents ===
1987 American League record Sources:
Team	BAL	BOS	CAL	CWS	CLE	DET	KC	MIL	MIN	NYY	OAK	SEA	TEX	TOR
Baltimore	—	1–12	9–3	8–4	7–6	4–9	9–3	2–11	5–7	3–10	7–5	4–8	7–5	1–12
Boston	12–1	—	4–8	3–9	7–6	2–11	6–6	6–7	7–5	7–6	4–8	7–5	7–5	6–7
California	3–9	8–4	—	8–5	7–5	3–9	5–8	7–5	8–5	3–9	6–7	7–6	5–8	5–7
Chicago	4–8	9–3	5–8	—	7–5	3–9	6–7	6–6	6–7	5–7	9–4	6–7	7–6	4–8
Cleveland	6–7	6–7	5–7	5–7	—	4–9	6–6	4–9	3–9	6–7	4–8	5–7	2–10	5–8
Detroit	9–4	11–2	9–3	9–3	9–4	—	5–7	6–7	8–4	5–8	5–7	7–5	8–4	7–6
Kansas City	3–9	6–6	8–5	7–6	6–6	7–5	—	4–8	8–5	5–7	5–8	9–4	7–6	8–4
Milwaukee	11–2	7–6	5–7	6–6	9–4	7–6	8–4	—	3–9	7–6	6–6	4–8	9–3	9–4
Minnesota	7–5	5–7	5–8	7–6	9–3	4–8	5–8	9–3	—	6–6	10–3	9–4	6–7	3–9
New York	10–3	6–7	9–3	7–5	7–6	8–5	7–5	6–7	6–6	—	5–7	7–5	5–7	6–7
Oakland	5–7	8–4	7–6	4–9	8–4	7–5	8–5	6–6	3–10	7–5	—	5–8	6–7	7–5
Seattle	8–4	5–7	6–7	7–6	7–5	5–7	4–9	8–4	4–9	5–7	8–5	—	9–4	2–10
Texas	5–7	5–7	8–5	6–7	10–2	4–8	6–7	3–9	7–6	7–5	7–6	4–9	—	3–9
Toronto	12–1	7–6	7–5	8–4	8–5	6–7	4–8	4–9	9–3	7–6	5–7	10–2	9–3	—

=== Opening Day starters ===
- Jose Canseco
- Mike Davis
- Alfredo Griffin
- Reggie Jackson
- Carney Lansford
- Rob Nelson
- Dwayne Murphy
- Tony Phillips
- Curt Young
- Mickey Tettleton

=== Notable transactions ===
- April 3, 1987: Brian Guinn (minors), Dave Wilder (minors), and Mark Leonette (minors) were traded by the Athletics to the Chicago Cubs for Dennis Eckersley and Dan Rohn.
- April 27, 1987: Dennis Lamp was signed as a free agent by the Athletics.
- April 30, 1987: Bill Caudill was signed as a free agent by the Athletics.
- May 12, 1987: Brian Harper was signed as a free agent by the Athletics.
- June 29, 1987: Bill Mooneyham was traded by the Athletics to the Milwaukee Brewers for Russ McGinnis.
- July 29, 1987: Johnnie LeMaster was released by the Oakland Athletics.
- August 29, 1987: Tim Belcher was traded by the Athletics to the Los Angeles Dodgers for Rick Honeycutt.
- August 30, 1987: The Athletics traded players to be named later to the San Diego Padres for Storm Davis. The Athletics completed the deal by sending Dave Leiper to the Padres on August 31 and Rob Nelson to the Padres on September 8.
- August 31, 1987: Gary Lavelle was signed as a free agent by the Athletics.

==== Draft picks ====
- June 2, 1987: Ron Coomer was drafted by the Oakland Athletics in the 14th round of the 1987 amateur draft. Player signed June 6, 1987.
- June 2, 1987: Scott Brosius was drafted by the Athletics in the 20th round of the 1987 Major League Baseball draft. Player signed June 9, 1987.

=== All-Star Game ===
The 1987 Major League Baseball All-Star Game was the 58th playing of the midsummer classic between the all-stars of the American League (AL) and National League (NL), the two leagues comprising Major League Baseball. The game was held on July 14, 1987, at the Oakland–Alameda County Coliseum in Oakland, California, the home of the Oakland Athletics of the American League. The game resulted in the National League defeating the American League 2–0 in 13 innings. Montreal Expos outfielder Tim Raines was named the Most Valuable Player.

=== Roster ===
1987 Oakland Athletics
Roster
Pitchers: 47 Joaquín Andújar; 32 Greg Cadaret; 37 Bill Caudill; 23 Chris Codiroli; 41 Storm Davis; 43 Dennis Eckersley; 30 Moose Haas; 40 Rick Honeycutt; 30 Jay Howell; 32 Bill Krueger; 49 Dennis Lamp; 46 Gary Lavelle; 52 Dave Leiper; 19,40 Gene Nelson; 53 Steve Ontiveros; 38 Dave Otto; 51 Eric Plunk; 27,38 José Rijo; 12,27 Rick Rodriguez; 34 Dave Stewart; 57 Dave Von Ohlen; 29 Curt Young	Catchers: 11 Matt Sinatro; 36 Terry Steinbach; 6 Mickey Tettleton; Infielders: 14 Tony Bernazard; 11 Ron Cey; 9 Mike Gallego; 3 Alfredo Griffin; 4 Carney Lansford; 13 Johnnie LeMaster; 25 Mark McGwire; 14,49 Rob Nelson; 2 Tony Phillips; 17 Walt Weiss; 7 Jerry Willard	Outfielders: 33 José Canseco; 16 Mike Davis; 31 Brian Harper; 24 Steve Henderson; 44 Reggie Jackson; 28 Stan Javier; 21 Dwayne Murphy; 22 Luis Polonia; 24 Alejandro Sánchez	Manager: 10 Tony La Russa; Coaches: 18 Dave Duncan (Pitching); 15 Rene Lachemann (First base); 5 Jim Lefebvre (Third base); 46 Joe Rudi (Hitting); 39 Dave McKay (Bullpen); 45 Mike Paul (Bullpen); 55 Bob Watson (Bench)

== Player stats ==
= Indicates team leader

=== Batting ===
==== Starters by position ====
Note: Pos = Position; G = Games played; AB = At bats; H = Hits; Avg. = Batting average; HR = Home runs; RBI = Runs batted in; SB = Stolen bases

Pos	Player	G	AB	R	H	Avg.	HR	RBI	SB
C	Terry Steinbach	122	391	66	111	.284	16	56	1
1B	Mark McGwire	151	557	97	161	.289	49	118	1
2B	Tony Phillips	111	379	48	91	.240	10	46	7
3B	Carney Lansford	151	554	89	160	.289	19	76	27
SS	Alfredo Griffin	144	494	69	130	.263	3	60	26
LF	José Canseco	159	630	81	162	.257	31	113	15
CF	Dwayne Murphy	82	219	39	51	.233	8	35	4
RF	Mike Davis	139	494	69	131	.265	22	72	19
DH	Reggie Jackson	115	336	42	74	.220	15	43	2

==== Other batters ====
Note: G = Games played; AB = At bats; R = Runs; H = Hits; Avg. = Batting average; HR = Home runs; RBI = Runs batted in; SB = Stolen bases

Player	G	AB	R	H	Avg.	HR	RBI	SB
Luis Polonia	125	435	78	125	.287	4	49	29
Tony Bernazard	61	214	34	57	.266	3	19	4
Mickey Tettleton	82	211	19	41	.194	8	26	1
Stan Javier	81	151	22	28	.185	2	9	3
Mike Gallego	72	124	18	31	.250	2	14	0
Steve Henderson	46	114	14	33	.289	3	9	0
Ron Cey	45	104	12	23	.221	4	11	0
Walt Weiss	16	26	3	12	.462	0	1	1
Johnnie LeMaster	20	24	3	2	.083	0	1	0
Rob Nelson	7	24	1	4	.167	0	0	0
Brian Harper	11	17	1	4	.235	0	3	0
Jerry Willard	7	6	1	1	.167	0	0	0
Alejandro Sánchez	2	3	0	0	.000	0	0	0
Matt Sinatro	6	3	0	0	.000	0	0	0

=== Pitching ===
==== Starting pitchers ====
Note: G = Games pitched; IP = Innings pitched; W = Wins; L= Losses; ERA = Earned run average; CG = Complete games; SO = Strikeouts

Player	G	IP	W	L	ERA	CG	SO
Dave Stewart	37	261.1	20	13	3.68	8	205
Curt Young	31	203.0	13	7	4.08	6	124
José Rijo	21	82.1	2	7	5.90	1	67
Joaquín Andújar	13	60.2	3	5	6.08	1	32
Moose Haas	9	40.2	2	2	5.75	0	13
Storm Davis	5	30.1	1	1	3.26	0	28
Chris Codiroli	3	11.1	0	2	8.74	0	4

==== Other pitchers ====
Note: G = Games pitched; IP = Innings pitched; W = Wins; L = Losses; ERA = Earned run average; SO = Strikeouts

Player	G	IP	W	L	ERA	SO
Steve Ontiveros	35	150.2	10	8	4.00	97
Eric Plunk	32	95.0	4	6	4.74	90
Rick Honeycutt	7	23.2	1	4	5.32	10

==== Relief pitchers ====
Note: G = Games pitched; IP = Innings pitched; W = Wins; L = Losses; SV = Saves; ERA = Earned run average; SO = Strikeouts

Player	G	IP	W	L	SV	ERA	SO
Dennis Eckersley	54	115.2	6	8	16	3.03	113
Gene Nelson	54	123.2	6	5	3	3.93	94
Dave Leiper	45	52.1	2	1	1	3.78	33
Jay Howell	36	44.1	3	4	16	5.89	35
Dennis Lamp	36	56.2	1	3	0	5.08	36
Greg Cadaret	29	39.2	6	2	0	4.54	30
Rick Rodriguez	15	24.1	1	0	0	2.96	9
Bill Caudill	6	8.0	0	0	1	9.00	8
Dave Otto	3	6.0	0	0	0	9.00	3
Dave Von Ohlen	4	6.0	0	0	0	7.50	3
Bill Krueger	9	5.2	0	3	0	9.53	2
Gary Lavelle	6	4.1	0	0	0	8.31	6

== Awards and records ==
- Mark McGwire, American League Rookie of the Year
- Mark McGwire, Rookie Record, Most Home Runs in One Season (49)

All-Star Game

- Jay Howell, P, Reserve
- Mark McGwire, 1B, Reserve

== McGwire's rookie record 49 home runs ==
Home Run	Game	Date	Inning	Location	Opposing Pitcher	Team
1	4	04-10-1987	7th	Oakland	Donnie Moore	Angels
2	15	04-21-1987	4th	Oakland	Urbano Lugo	Angels
3	18	04-25-1987	3rd	Oakland	Scott Bankhead	Mariners
4	22	04-29-1987	2nd	Oakland	Ted Higuera	Brewers
5	24	05-01-1987	3rd	Oakland	Walt Terrell	Tigers
6	29	05-08-1987	4th	Detroit	Frank Tanana	Tigers
7	29	05-08-1987	8th	Detroit	Frank Tanana	Tigers
8	30	05-09-1987	6th	Detroit	Eric King	Tigers
9	31	05-10-1987	2nd	Detroit	Jack Morris	Tigers
10	31	05-10-1987	4th	Detroit	Jack Morris	Tigers
11	35	05-16-1987	1st	Oakland	Jimmy Key	Blue Jays
12	37	05-18-1987	7th	Oakland	Tim Stoddard	Yankees
13	38	05-19-1987	3rd	Oakland	Dennis Rasmussen	Yankees
14	39	05-20-1987	2nd	Oakland	Charles Hudson	Yankees
15	41	05-23-1987	2nd	Oakland	Mike Boddicker	Orioles
16	42	05-24-1987	2nd	Oakland	Jeff Ballard	Orioles
17	44	05-27-1987	4th	Toronto	Joe Johnson	Blue Jays
18	48	05-31-1987	2nd	New York	Tommy John	Yankees
19	48	05-31-1987	7th	New York	Tommy John	Yankees
20	59	06-13-1987	4th	Arlington Stadium	Ed Correa	Rangers
21	61	06-15-1987	4th	Kansas City	Charlie Leibrandt	Royals
22	66	06-21-1987	8th	Oakland	Jose Guzman	Rangers
23	72	06-27-1987	1st	Cleveland	Ken Schrom	Indians
24	72	06-27-1987	5th	Cleveland	Ed Vande Berg	Indians
25	72	06-27-1987	9th	Cleveland	Scott Bailes	Indians
26	73	06-28-1987	4th	Cleveland	Tom Candiotti	Indians
27	73	06-28-1987	7th	Cleveland	Tom Candiotti	Indians
28	75	06-30-1987	1st	Chicago	Scott Nielsen	White Sox
29	79	07-04-1987	5th	Boston	Bruce Hurst	Red Sox
30	80	07-05-1987	4th	Boston	Oil Can Boyd	Red Sox
31	83	07-08-1987	6th	Oakland	Jeff Robinson	Tigers
32	86	07-11-1987	2nd	Oakland	Bill Wegman	Brewers
33	86	07-11-1987	8th	Oakland	Dan Plesac	Brewers
34	89	07-17-1987	10th	Boston	Calvin Schiraldi	Red Sox
35	93	07-21-1987	10th	Detroit	Eric King	Tigers
36	94	07-22-1987	8th	Detroit	Mark Thurmond	Tigers
37	101	07-29-1987	4th	Oakland	Don Sutton	Angels
38	113	08-11-1987	7th	Seattle	Mike Moore	Mariners
39	115	08-14-1987	6th	Anaheim	Don Sutton	Angels
40	129	08-29-1987	10th	Toronto	Mark Eichhorn	Blue Jays
41	134	09-04-1987	5th	Baltimore	Mike Boddicker	Orioles
42	136	09-05-1987	2nd	Baltimore	Jon Habyan	Orioles
43	142	09-12-1987	2nd	Oakland	Charlie Leibrandt	Royals
44	145	09-15-1987	4th	Arlington Stadium	Greg Harris	Rangers
45	145	09-15-1987	6th	Arlington Stadium	Greg Harris	Rangers
46	148	09-19-1987	1st	Kansas City	Mélido Pérez	Royals
47	153	09-24-1987	9th	Oakland	Scott Bannister	White Sox
48	154	09-25-1987	9th	Oakland	Bobby Thigpen	White Sox
49	157	09-29-1987	1st	Oakland	John Farrell	Indians

== Farm system ==
Level	Team	League	Manager
AAA	Tacoma Tigers	Pacific Coast League	Keith Lieppman
AA	Huntsville Stars	Southern League	Brad Fischer
A	Modesto A's	California League	Tommie Reynolds
A	Madison Muskies	Midwest League	Jim Nettles
A-Short Season	Medford A's	Northwest League	Dave Hudgens
