= 1987 Baltimore Orioles season =

Major League Baseball season

1987 Baltimore Orioles
- League: American League
- Division: East
- Ballpark: Memorial Stadium
- City: Baltimore, Maryland
- Record: 67–95 (.414)
- Divisional place: 6th
- Owners: Edward Bennett Williams
- General managers: Hank Peters
- Managers: Cal Ripken, Sr.
- Television: WMAR-TV (Chuck Thompson, Brooks Robinson); Home Team Sports (Rex Barney, Mel Proctor, John Lowenstein)
- Radio: WCBM (Jon Miller, Jack Wiers)

The 1987 Baltimore Orioles season was the 87th season in Baltimore Orioles franchise history, the 34th in Baltimore, and the 34th at Memorial Stadium. The Orioles finished sixth in the American League East with a record of 67 wins and 95 losses.

== Offseason ==
- January 30, 1987: Jack O'Connor was signed as a free agent by the Orioles.
- February 12, 1987: Ray Knight was signed as a free agent by the Orioles.
- March 30, 1987: Rich Bordi was released by the Orioles.

== Regular season ==
- On April 15, 1987, Juan Nieves threw the first no hitter in Milwaukee Brewers history. The Brewers beat the Baltimore Orioles by a score of 7–0.

=== Season standings ===
AL East
| Team | W | L | Pct. | GB | Home | Road |
|---|---|---|---|---|---|---|
| Detroit Tigers | 98 | 64 | .605 | — | 54‍–‍27 | 44‍–‍37 |
| Toronto Blue Jays | 96 | 66 | .593 | 2 | 52‍–‍29 | 44‍–‍37 |
| Milwaukee Brewers | 91 | 71 | .562 | 7 | 48‍–‍33 | 43‍–‍38 |
| New York Yankees | 89 | 73 | .549 | 9 | 51‍–‍30 | 38‍–‍43 |
| Boston Red Sox | 78 | 84 | .481 | 20 | 50‍–‍30 | 28‍–‍54 |
| Baltimore Orioles | 67 | 95 | .414 | 31 | 31‍–‍51 | 36‍–‍44 |
| Cleveland Indians | 61 | 101 | .377 | 37 | 35‍–‍46 | 26‍–‍55 |

=== Record vs. opponents ===
1987 American League record Sources:
| Team | BAL | BOS | CAL | CWS | CLE | DET | KC | MIL | MIN | NYY | OAK | SEA | TEX | TOR |
|---|---|---|---|---|---|---|---|---|---|---|---|---|---|---|
| Baltimore | — | 1–12 | 9–3 | 8–4 | 7–6 | 4–9 | 9–3 | 2–11 | 5–7 | 3–10 | 7–5 | 4–8 | 7–5 | 1–12 |
| Boston | 12–1 | — | 4–8 | 3–9 | 7–6 | 2–11 | 6–6 | 6–7 | 7–5 | 7–6 | 4–8 | 7–5 | 7–5 | 6–7 |
| California | 3–9 | 8–4 | — | 8–5 | 7–5 | 3–9 | 5–8 | 7–5 | 8–5 | 3–9 | 6–7 | 7–6 | 5–8 | 5–7 |
| Chicago | 4–8 | 9–3 | 5–8 | — | 7–5 | 3–9 | 6–7 | 6–6 | 6–7 | 5–7 | 9–4 | 6–7 | 7–6 | 4–8 |
| Cleveland | 6–7 | 6–7 | 5–7 | 5–7 | — | 4–9 | 6–6 | 4–9 | 3–9 | 6–7 | 4–8 | 5–7 | 2–10 | 5–8 |
| Detroit | 9–4 | 11–2 | 9–3 | 9–3 | 9–4 | — | 5–7 | 6–7 | 8–4 | 5–8 | 5–7 | 7–5 | 8–4 | 7–6 |
| Kansas City | 3–9 | 6–6 | 8–5 | 7–6 | 6–6 | 7–5 | — | 4–8 | 8–5 | 5–7 | 5–8 | 9–4 | 7–6 | 8–4 |
| Milwaukee | 11–2 | 7–6 | 5–7 | 6–6 | 9–4 | 7–6 | 8–4 | — | 3–9 | 7–6 | 6–6 | 4–8 | 9–3 | 9–4 |
| Minnesota | 7–5 | 5–7 | 5–8 | 7–6 | 9–3 | 4–8 | 5–8 | 9–3 | — | 6–6 | 10–3 | 9–4 | 6–7 | 3–9 |
| New York | 10–3 | 6–7 | 9–3 | 7–5 | 7–6 | 8–5 | 7–5 | 6–7 | 6–6 | — | 5–7 | 7–5 | 5–7 | 6–7 |
| Oakland | 5–7 | 8–4 | 7–6 | 4–9 | 8–4 | 7–5 | 8–5 | 6–6 | 3–10 | 7–5 | — | 5–8 | 6–7 | 7–5 |
| Seattle | 8–4 | 5–7 | 6–7 | 7–6 | 7–5 | 5–7 | 4–9 | 8–4 | 4–9 | 5–7 | 8–5 | — | 9–4 | 2–10 |
| Texas | 5–7 | 5–7 | 8–5 | 6–7 | 10–2 | 4–8 | 6–7 | 3–9 | 7–6 | 7–5 | 7–6 | 4–9 | — | 3–9 |
| Toronto | 12–1 | 7–6 | 7–5 | 8–4 | 8–5 | 6–7 | 4–8 | 4–9 | 9–3 | 7–6 | 5–7 | 10–2 | 9–3 | — |

=== Notable transactions ===
- May 22, 1987: John Shelby and Brad Havens were traded by the Orioles to the Los Angeles Dodgers for Tom Niedenfuer.
- June 2, 1987: Jack Voigt was drafted by the Orioles in the 9th round of the 1987 Major League Baseball draft.
- June 23, 1987: Doug Corbett was signed as a free agent with the Orioles.
- August 21, 1987: Doug Corbett was released by the Orioles.
- August 31, 1987: Mike Flanagan was traded by the Orioles to the Toronto Blue Jays for Oswaldo Peraza and a player to be named later. The Blue Jays completed the deal by sending José Mesa to the Orioles on September 4.

== Roster ==
1987 Baltimore Orioles
Roster
| Pitchers: 41 Don Aase; 57 Tony Arnold; 34 Jeff Ballard; 45 Eric Bell; 52 Mike Boddicker; 23 Doug Corbett; 47 Luis DeLeón; 39 Ken Dixon; 46 Mike Flanagan; 42 Mike Griffin; 54 John Habyan; 48 Mike Kinnunen; 16 Scott McGregor; 51 José Mesa; 49 Tom Niedenfuer; 21 Jack O'Connor; 24 Dave Schmidt; 32 Mark Williamson | Catchers: 15 Terry Kennedy; 26 Carl Nichols; 6 Floyd Rayford; 14 Dave Van Gorder; Infielders: 17 Rick Burleson; 88 Rene Gonzales; 11 Jackie Gutiérrez; 25 Ray Knight; 33 Eddie Murray; 3 Billy Ripken; 8 Cal Ripken Jr.; 12 Pete Stanicek; 37 Ron Washington; 2 Alan Wiggins | Outfielders: 9 Jim Dwyer; 38 Ken Gerhart; 27 Lee Lacy; 19 Fred Lynn; 18 Larry Sheets; 37 John Shelby; 42 Nelson Simmons; 43 Mike Young | Manager: 7 Cal Ripken, Sr.; Coaches: 10 Terry Crowley (First base/hitting); 44 Elrod Hendricks (Bullpen); 20 Frank Robinson (Bench); 31 Mark Wiley (Pitching); 40 Jimmy Williams (Third Base) |

== Player stats ==
=== Batting ===
==== Starters by position ====
Note: Pos = Position; G = Games played; AB = At bats; H = Hits; Avg. = Batting average; HR = Home runs; RBI = Runs batted in

| Pos | Player | G | AB | H | Avg. | HR | RBI |
|---|---|---|---|---|---|---|---|
| C | Terry Kennedy | 143 | 512 | 128 | .250 | 18 | 62 |
| 1B | Eddie Murray | 160 | 618 | 171 | .277 | 30 | 91 |
| 2B | Billy Ripken | 58 | 234 | 72 | .308 | 2 | 20 |
| 3B | Ray Knight | 150 | 563 | 144 | .256 | 14 | 65 |
| SS | Cal Ripken Jr. | 162 | 624 | 157 | .252 | 27 | 98 |
| LF | Larry Sheets | 135 | 469 | 148 | .316 | 31 | 94 |
| CF | Fred Lynn | 111 | 396 | 100 | .253 | 23 | 60 |
| RF | Lee Lacy | 87 | 258 | 63 | .244 | 7 | 28 |
| DH | Mike Young | 110 | 363 | 87 | .240 | 16 | 39 |

==== Other batters ====
Note: G = Games played; AB = At bats; H = Hits; Avg. = Batting average; HR = Home runs; RBI = Runs batted in

| Player | G | AB | H | Avg. | HR | RBI |
|---|---|---|---|---|---|---|
| Alan Wiggins | 85 | 306 | 71 | .232 | 1 | 15 |
| Ken Gerhart | 92 | 284 | 69 | .243 | 14 | 34 |
| Jim Dwyer | 92 | 241 | 66 | .274 | 15 | 33 |
| Rick Burleson | 62 | 206 | 43 | .209 | 2 | 14 |
| Pete Stanicek | 30 | 113 | 31 | .274 | 0 | 9 |
| Ron Washington | 26 | 79 | 16 | .203 | 1 | 6 |
| Mike Hart | 34 | 76 | 12 | .158 | 4 | 12 |
| Rene Gonzales | 37 | 60 | 16 | .267 | 1 | 7 |
| Floyd Rayford | 20 | 50 | 11 | .220 | 2 | 3 |
| Nelson Simmons | 16 | 49 | 13 | .265 | 1 | 4 |
| John Shelby | 21 | 32 | 6 | .188 | 1 | 3 |
| Dave Van Gorder | 12 | 21 | 5 | .238 | 1 | 1 |
| Carl Nichols | 13 | 21 | 8 | .381 | 0 | 3 |
| Jackie Gutiérrez | 3 | 1 | 0 | .000 | 0 | 0 |

=== Pitching ===
==== Starting pitchers ====
Note: G = Games pitched; IP = Innings pitched; W = Wins; L = Losses; ERA = Earned run average; SO = Strikeouts

| Player | G | IP | W | L | ERA | SO |
|---|---|---|---|---|---|---|
| Mike Boddicker | 33 | 226.0 | 10 | 12 | 4.18 | 152 |
| Eric Bell | 33 | 165.0 | 10 | 13 | 5.45 | 111 |
| Mike Flanagan | 16 | 94.2 | 3 | 6 | 4.94 | 50 |
| Jeff Ballard | 14 | 69.2 | 2 | 8 | 6.59 | 27 |
| José Mesa | 6 | 31.1 | 1 | 3 | 6.03 | 17 |

==== Other pitchers ====
Note: G = Games pitched; IP = Innings pitched; W = Wins; L = Losses; ERA = Earned run average; SO = Strikeouts

| Player | G | IP | W | L | ERA | SO |
|---|---|---|---|---|---|---|
| Dave Schmidt | 35 | 124.0 | 10 | 5 | 3.77 | 70 |
| John Habyan | 27 | 116.1 | 6 | 7 | 4.80 | 64 |
| Ken Dixon | 34 | 105.0 | 7 | 10 | 6.43 | 91 |
| Scott McGregor | 26 | 85.1 | 2 | 7 | 6.64 | 39 |
| Mike Griffin | 23 | 74.1 | 3 | 5 | 4.36 | 42 |

==== Relief pitchers ====
Note: G = Games pitched; W = Wins; L = Losses; SV = Saves; ERA = Earned run average; SO = Strikeouts

| Player | G | W | L | SV | ERA | SO |
|---|---|---|---|---|---|---|
| Tom Niedenfuer | 45 | 3 | 5 | 13 | 4.99 | 37 |
| Mark Williamson | 61 | 8 | 9 | 3 | 4.03 | 73 |
| Jack O'Connor | 29 | 1 | 1 | 2 | 4.30 | 33 |
| Tony Arnold | 27 | 0 | 0 | 0 | 5.77 | 18 |
| Mike Kinnunen | 18 | 0 | 0 | 0 | 4.95 | 14 |
| Doug Corbett | 11 | 0 | 2 | 1 | 7.83 | 16 |
| Luis DeLeón | 11 | 0 | 2 | 1 | 4.79 | 13 |
| Don Aase | 7 | 1 | 0 | 2 | 2.25 | 3 |

== Farm system ==
| Level | Team | League | Manager |
|---|---|---|---|
| AAA | Rochester Red Wings | International League | John Hart |
| AA | Charlotte O's | Southern League | Greg Biagini |
| A | Hagerstown Suns | Carolina League | Glenn Gulliver |
| A-Short Season | Newark Orioles | New York–Penn League | Mike Hart |
| Rookie | Bluefield Orioles | Appalachian League | Jim Pamlanye |
