= 1987 Cleveland Indians season =

1987 Cleveland Indians
- League: American League
- Division: East
- Ballpark: Cleveland Municipal Stadium
- City: Cleveland, Ohio
- Owners: Richard Jacobs
- General managers: Joe Klein, Hank Peters
- Managers: Pat Corrales, Doc Edwards
- Television: WUAB; Joe Tait, Jack Corrigan
- Radio: WWWE; Herb Score, Steve Lamar

The 1987 Cleveland Indians season was the 87th in franchise history. The team, predicted by Sports Illustrated magazine to finish first, finished seventh in the American League East. Club president Peter Bavasi would resign before the regular season began. Bavasi had joined the Indians in November 1984. As team president, he served on Major League Baseball's Executive Council. During the 1986 season, the team had an 84–78 record, its best since 1968, and attendance of 1.47 million, its highest since 1959. There was much optimism that the team would reach its full potential in 1987.

Sluggers Joe Carter and Cory Snyder were featured on the cover of Sports Illustrated on April 6, 1987, with the headline "Indian Uprising". The Indians were being predicted as the best team in baseball on the back of their two 30+ home run hitters. What sports writers overlooked was that Cleveland had the worst performing pitching staff in the majors, despite the presence of 300 game winners Phil Niekro and Steve Carlton, as well as Tom Candiotti (with Niekro and Candiotti, Cleveland had two starters whose main pitch was the knuckleball).

The 1987 Indians would fall well short of SI's bold prediction. They were not above .500 even once all season, and an 8–20 May ended any realistic hope of contention. They finished 61–101, the worst record in all of baseball. The season would go on to be associated with the Sports Illustrated cover jinx.

== Offseason ==
- November 7, 1986: Fran Mullins was released by the Indians.
- November 28, 1986: Casey Parsons was signed as a free agent by the Indians.
- December 23, 1986: John Butcher was released by the Indians.
- January 19, 1987: Doug Frobel was signed as a free agent with the Cleveland Indians.
- February 23, 1987: Curt Wardle was traded by the Indians to the Oakland Athletics for Jeff Kaiser.

== Regular season ==
In 1987, the Cleveland Indians achieved a baseball first. The Indians had veteran pitchers Steve Carlton and Phil Niekro on their roster to add experience. Their most notable accomplishment was appearing in a game together against the New York Yankees at Yankee Stadium. Carlton and Niekro became the first teammates and 300-game winners to appear in the same game. Both were ineffective in a 10-6 Yankee victory. It would be Carlton's first and only pitching appearance at the legendary stadium. Neither pitcher finished the season with the Indians. Carlton would end up with the Minnesota Twins and win a World Series championship. Niekro would be picked up by the Toronto Blue Jays and come within two games of winning the American League East Championship.

=== Season standings ===
AL East
Team	W	L	Pct.	GB	Home	Road
Detroit Tigers	98	64	.605	—	54‍–‍27	44‍–‍37
Toronto Blue Jays	96	66	.593	2	52‍–‍29	44‍–‍37
Milwaukee Brewers	91	71	.562	7	48‍–‍33	43‍–‍38
New York Yankees	89	73	.549	9	51‍–‍30	38‍–‍43
Boston Red Sox	78	84	.481	20	50‍–‍30	28‍–‍54
Baltimore Orioles	67	95	.414	31	31‍–‍51	36‍–‍44
Cleveland Indians	61	101	.377	37	35‍–‍46	26‍–‍55

=== Record vs. opponents ===
1987 American League record Sources:
Team	BAL	BOS	CAL	CWS	CLE	DET	KC	MIL	MIN	NYY	OAK	SEA	TEX	TOR
Baltimore	—	1–12	9–3	8–4	7–6	4–9	9–3	2–11	5–7	3–10	7–5	4–8	7–5	1–12
Boston	12–1	—	4–8	3–9	7–6	2–11	6–6	6–7	7–5	7–6	4–8	7–5	7–5	6–7
California	3–9	8–4	—	8–5	7–5	3–9	5–8	7–5	8–5	3–9	6–7	7–6	5–8	5–7
Chicago	4–8	9–3	5–8	—	7–5	3–9	6–7	6–6	6–7	5–7	9–4	6–7	7–6	4–8
Cleveland	6–7	6–7	5–7	5–7	—	4–9	6–6	4–9	3–9	6–7	4–8	5–7	2–10	5–8
Detroit	9–4	11–2	9–3	9–3	9–4	—	5–7	6–7	8–4	5–8	5–7	7–5	8–4	7–6
Kansas City	3–9	6–6	8–5	7–6	6–6	7–5	—	4–8	8–5	5–7	5–8	9–4	7–6	8–4
Milwaukee	11–2	7–6	5–7	6–6	9–4	7–6	8–4	—	3–9	7–6	6–6	4–8	9–3	9–4
Minnesota	7–5	5–7	5–8	7–6	9–3	4–8	5–8	9–3	—	6–6	10–3	9–4	6–7	3–9
New York	10–3	6–7	9–3	7–5	7–6	8–5	7–5	6–7	6–6	—	5–7	7–5	5–7	6–7
Oakland	5–7	8–4	7–6	4–9	8–4	7–5	8–5	6–6	3–10	7–5	—	5–8	6–7	7–5
Seattle	8–4	5–7	6–7	7–6	7–5	5–7	4–9	8–4	4–9	5–7	8–5	—	9–4	2–10
Texas	5–7	5–7	8–5	6–7	10–2	4–8	6–7	3–9	7–6	7–5	7–6	4–9	—	3–9
Toronto	12–1	7–6	7–5	8–4	8–5	6–7	4–8	4–9	9–3	7–6	5–7	10–2	9–3	—

=== Transactions ===
- April 4, 1987: Steve Carlton signed as a free agent with the Indians.
- May 11, 1987: Don Schulze was traded by the Indians to the New York Mets for Ricky Nelson.
- May 12, 1987: Dave Gallagher was traded by the Indians to the Seattle Mariners for Mark Huismann.
- July 15, 1987: Tony Bernazard was traded by the Indians to the Oakland Athletics for Darrel Akerfelds and Brian Dorsett.
- July 31, 1987: Steve Carlton was traded by the Indians to the Minnesota Twins for a player to be named later. The Twins completed the deal by sending Jeff Perry (minors) to the Indians on August 18.

==== Draft picks ====
- June 2, 1987: 1987 Major League Baseball draft
  - Albert Belle was drafted by the Indians in the 2nd round. Belle signed on August 27, 1987.
  - Beau Allred was drafted by the Indians in the 25th round.

=== Opening Day Lineup ===
Opening Day Starters
#	Name	Position
4	Tony Bernazard	2B
2	Brett Butler	CF
14	Julio Franco	SS
30	Joe Carter	LF
29	Andre Thornton	DH
26	Brook Jacoby	3B
10	Pat Tabler	1B
28	Cory Snyder	RF
23	Chris Bando	C
49	Tom Candiotti	P

=== Roster ===
1987 Cleveland Indians
Roster
Pitchers: 47 Darrel Akerfelds; 47 Mike Armstrong; 43 Scott Bailes; 13 Ernie Camacho; 49 Tom Candiotti; 32 Steve Carlton; 36,11 Jamie Easterly; 52 John Farrell; 39 Don Gordon; 37 Mark Huismann; 46 Doug Jones; 48 Jeff Kaiser; 35 Phil Niekro; 44 Reggie Ritter; 18 Ken Schrom; 53 Sammy Stewart; 21 Greg Swindell; 44,36 Ed Vande Berg; 22 Frank Wills; 42 Rich Yett	Catchers: 6 Andy Allanson; 23 Chris Bando; 24 Rick Dempsey; 4 Brian Dorsett; Infielders: 16 Jay Bell; 4 Tony Bernazard; 30 Joe Carter; 14 Julio Franco; 1 Tommy Hinzo; 26 Brook Jacoby; 17 Junior Noboa; 10 Pat Tabler; 34 Eddie Williams	Outfielders: 2 Brett Butler; 8 Carmen Castillo; 12 Dave Clark; 31,38 Doug Frobel; 15 Dave Gallagher; 27 Mel Hall; 20 Otis Nixon; 15 Casey Parsons; 28 Cory Snyder; Other batters: 29 Andre Thornton	Manager: 7 Pat Corrales (Apr 6 - July 15); 32 Doc Edwards (July 16 - Oct 4); Coaches: 1 Jack Aker (Pitching, Apr 6 - Jun 30); 25 Bobby Bonds (Hitting/First Base); 31 Steve Comer (Pitching, July 1 - Oct 4); 32 Doc Edwards (Bullpen); 45 John Goryl (Third Base); 7 Luis Isaac (Bullpen); 4 Dave Roberts

== Statistics ==
=== Batting ===
Note: G = Games played; AB = At bats; R = Runs scored; H = Hits; 2B = Doubles; 3B = Triples; HR = Home runs; RBI = Runs batted in; AVG = Batting average; SB = Stolen bases

Player	G	AB	R	H	2B	3B	HR	RBI	AVG	SB
Andy Allanson	50	154	17	41	6	0	3	16	.266	1
Chris Bando	89	211	20	46	9	0	5	16	.218	0
Jay Bell	38	125	14	27	9	1	2	13	.216	2
Tony Bernazard	79	293	39	70	12	1	11	30	.239	7
Brett Butler	137	522	91	154	25	8	9	41	.295	33
Joe Carter	149	588	83	155	27	2	32	106	.264	31
Carmelo Castillo	89	220	27	55	17	0	11	31	.250	1
Dave Clark	29	87	11	18	5	0	3	12	.207	1
Rick Dempsey	60	141	16	25	10	0	1	9	.177	0
Brian Dorsett	5	11	2	3	0	0	1	3	.273	0
Julio Franco	128	495	86	158	24	3	8	52	.319	32
Doug Frobel	29	40	5	4	0	0	2	5	.100	0
Dave Gallagher	15	36	2	4	1	1	0	1	.111	2
Mel Hall	142	485	57	136	21	1	18	76	.280	5
Tommy Hinzo	67	257	31	68	9	3	3	21	.265	9
Brook Jacoby	155	540	73	162	26	4	32	69	.300	2
Otis Nixon	19	17	2	1	0	0	0	1	.059	2
Junior Noboa	39	80	7	18	2	1	0	7	.225	1
Casey Parsons	18	25	2	4	0	0	1	5	.160	0
Cory Snyder	157	577	74	136	24	2	33	82	.236	5
Pat Tabler	151	553	66	170	34	3	11	86	.307	5
Andre Thornton	36	85	8	10	2	0	0	5	.118	1
Eddie Williams	22	64	9	11	4	0	1	4	.172	0
Team totals	162	5606	742	1476	267	30	187	691	.263	140

=== Pitching ===
Note: W = Wins; L = Losses; ERA = Earned run average; G = Games pitched; GS = Games started; SV = Saves; IP = Innings pitched; H = Hits allowed; R = Runs allowed; ER = Earned runs allowed; BB = Walks allowed; K = Strikeouts

Player	W	L	ERA	G	GS	SV	IP	H	R	ER	BB	K
Darrel Akerfelds	2	6	6.75	16	13	0	74.2	84	60	56	38	42
Mike Armstrong	1	0	8.68	14	0	1	18.2	27	18	18	10	9
Scott Bailes	7	8	4.64	39	17	6	120.1	145	75	62	47	65
Ernie Camacho	0	1	9.22	15	0	1	13.2	21	14	14	5	9
Tom Candiotti	7	18	4.78	32	32	0	201.2	193	132	107	93	111
Steve Carlton	5	9	5.37	23	14	1	109.0	111	76	65	63	71
Jamie Easterly	1	1	4.55	16	0	0	31.2	26	17	16	13	22
John Farrell	5	1	3.39	10	9	0	69.0	68	29	26	22	28
Don Gordon	0	3	4.08	21	0	1	39.2	49	31	18	12	20
Mark Huismann	2	3	5.09	20	0	2	35.1	38	22	20	8	23
Doug Jones	6	5	3.15	49	0	8	91.1	101	45	32	24	87
Jeff Kaiser	0	0	16.20	2	0	0	3.1	4	6	6	3	2
Phil Niekro	7	11	5.89	22	22	0	123.2	142	83	81	53	57
Reggie Ritter	1	1	6.08	14	0	0	26.2	33	21	18	16	11
Ken Schrom	6	13	6.50	32	29	0	153.2	185	126	111	57	61
Sammy Stewart	4	2	5.67	25	0	3	27.0	25	22	17	21	25
Greg Swindell	3	8	5.10	16	15	0	102.1	112	62	58	37	97
Ed Vande Berg	1	0	5.10	55	0	0	72.1	96	42	41	21	40
Tom Waddell	0	1	14.29	6	0	0	5.2	7	10	9	7	6
Frank Wills	0	1	5.06	6	0	1	5.1	3	3	3	7	4
Rich Yett	3	9	5.25	37	11	1	97.2	96	63	57	49	59
Team totals	61	101	5.28	162	162	25	1422.2	1566	957	835	606	849

== Award winners ==
All-Star Game

- Pat Tabler, designated hitter, reserve

== Farm system ==
Level	Team	League	Manager
AAA	Buffalo Bisons	American Association	Orlando Gómez and Steve Swisher
AA	Williamsport Bills	Eastern League	Steve Swisher and Orlando Gómez
A	Kinston Indians	Carolina League	Mike Hargrove
A	Waterloo Indians	Midwest League	Glenn Adams
Rookie	Burlington Indians	Appalachian League	Tom Chandler

LEAGUE CHAMPIONS: Burlington
