= 1987 California Angels season =

Major League Baseball season

1987 California Angels
- League: American League
- Division: West
- Ballpark: Anaheim Stadium
- City: Anaheim, California
- Record: 75–87 (.463)
- Divisional place: 7th
- Owner: Gene Autry
- General manager: Mike Port
- Manager: Gene Mauch
- Television: KTLA (Joe Torre, Bob Starr, Joel Meyers)
- Radio: KMPC (Ken Brett, Joel Meyers, Al Conin); XPRS (Ruben Valentin, Ulpiano Cos Villa)
- Stats: ESPN.com; Baseball Reference

The 1987 California Angels season was the 27th season of the California Angels franchise in the American League, the 22nd in Anaheim, and their 22nd season playing their home games at Anaheim Stadium. The Angels finished sixth in the American League west with a record of 75 wins and 87 losses.

== Regular season ==
=== Season standings ===
AL West
Team	W	L	Pct.	GB	Home	Road
Minnesota Twins	85	77	.525	—	56‍–‍25	29‍–‍52
Kansas City Royals	83	79	.512	2	46‍–‍35	37‍–‍44
Oakland Athletics	81	81	.500	4	42‍–‍39	39‍–‍42
Seattle Mariners	78	84	.481	7	40‍–‍41	38‍–‍43
Chicago White Sox	77	85	.475	8	38‍–‍43	39‍–‍42
Texas Rangers	75	87	.463	10	43‍–‍38	32‍–‍49
California Angels	75	87	.463	10	38‍–‍43	37‍–‍44

=== Record vs. opponents ===
1987 American League record Sources:
Team	BAL	BOS	CAL	CWS	CLE	DET	KC	MIL	MIN	NYY	OAK	SEA	TEX	TOR
Baltimore	—	1–12	9–3	8–4	7–6	4–9	9–3	2–11	5–7	3–10	7–5	4–8	7–5	1–12
Boston	12–1	—	4–8	3–9	7–6	2–11	6–6	6–7	7–5	7–6	4–8	7–5	7–5	6–7
California	3–9	8–4	—	8–5	7–5	3–9	5–8	7–5	8–5	3–9	6–7	7–6	5–8	5–7
Chicago	4–8	9–3	5–8	—	7–5	3–9	6–7	6–6	6–7	5–7	9–4	6–7	7–6	4–8
Cleveland	6–7	6–7	5–7	5–7	—	4–9	6–6	4–9	3–9	6–7	4–8	5–7	2–10	5–8
Detroit	9–4	11–2	9–3	9–3	9–4	—	5–7	6–7	8–4	5–8	5–7	7–5	8–4	7–6
Kansas City	3–9	6–6	8–5	7–6	6–6	7–5	—	4–8	8–5	5–7	5–8	9–4	7–6	8–4
Milwaukee	11–2	7–6	5–7	6–6	9–4	7–6	8–4	—	3–9	7–6	6–6	4–8	9–3	9–4
Minnesota	7–5	5–7	5–8	7–6	9–3	4–8	5–8	9–3	—	6–6	10–3	9–4	6–7	3–9
New York	10–3	6–7	9–3	7–5	7–6	8–5	7–5	6–7	6–6	—	5–7	7–5	5–7	6–7
Oakland	5–7	8–4	7–6	4–9	8–4	7–5	8–5	6–6	3–10	7–5	—	5–8	6–7	7–5
Seattle	8–4	5–7	6–7	7–6	7–5	5–7	4–9	8–4	4–9	5–7	8–5	—	9–4	2–10
Texas	5–7	5–7	8–5	6–7	10–2	4–8	6–7	3–9	7–6	7–5	7–6	4–9	—	3–9
Toronto	12–1	7–6	7–5	8–4	8–5	6–7	4–8	4–9	9–3	7–6	5–7	10–2	9–3	—

=== Notable transactions ===
- December 19, 1986: Ron Romanick was traded by the California Angels with a player to be named later to the New York Yankees for a player to be named later and Butch Wynegar.
- January 8, 1987: Doug DeCinces was signed as a free agent with the California Angels.
- January 22, 1987: Jim Eppard was purchased by the California Angels from the Oakland Athletics.
- May 1, 1987: Bob Boone was signed as a free agent with the California Angels.
- May 19, 1987: Doug Corbett was signed as a free agent with the California Angels.
- June 1, 1987: Greg Minton was signed as a free agent with the California Angels.
- June 19, 1987: Doug Corbett was released by the California Angels.
- June 22, 1987: Alan Mills was sent by the California Angels to the New York Yankees to complete an earlier deal made on December 19, 1986.
- July 28, 1987: Bill Buckner signed as a free agent with the California Angels.
- September 15, 1987: John Candelaria was traded by the California Angels to the New York Mets for Jeff Richardson and Shane Young (minors).

==== Draft picks ====
- June 2, 1987: John Orton was drafted by the California Angels in the 1st round (25th pick) of the 1987 amateur draft.
- June 2, 1987: Rubén Amaro, Jr. was drafted by the California Angels in the 11th round of the 1987 amateur draft. Player signed June 16, 1987.

=== Roster ===
1987 California Angels
Roster
Pitchers: 41 DeWayne Buice; 45 John Candelaria; 46 Mike Cook; 31 Chuck Finley; 27 Willie Fraser; 34 Miguel García; 34 Bryan Harvey; 17 Jack Lazorko; 36 Gary Lucas; 18 Urbano Lugo; 15 Kirk McCaskill; 38 Greg Minton; 37 Donnie Moore; 44 Jerry Reuss; 20 Don Sutton; 39 Mike Witt	Catchers: 8 Bob Boone; 13,58 Jack Fimple; 32 Darrell Miller; 35 Butch Wynegar; Infielders: 6 Bill Buckner; 11 Doug DeCinces; 21 Wally Joyner; 28 Mark McLemore; 14 Gus Polidor; 3 Johnny Ray; 22 Dick Schofield	Outfielders: 10 Tony Armas; 5 Brian Downing; 12 Jim Eppard; 25 George Hendrick; 16 Jack Howell; 9 Ruppert Jones; 24 Gary Pettis; 6,7 Mark Ryal; 30 Devon White; 2 Tack Wilson	Manager: 3 Gene Mauch; Coaches: 49 Bob Clear; 1 Bobby Knoop; 53 Marcel Lachemann; 50 Jimmie Reese; 47 Moose Stubing

== Player stats ==
=== Batting ===
==== Starters by position ====
Note: Pos = Position; G = Games played; AB = At bats; H = Hits; Avg. = Batting average; HR = Home runs; RBI = Runs batted in

Pos	Player	G	AB	H	Avg.	HR	RBI
C	Bob Boone	128	389	94	.242	3	33
1B	Wally Joyner	149	564	161	.285	34	117
2B	Mark McLemore	138	433	102	.236	3	41
3B	Doug DeCinces	133	453	106	.234	16	63
SS	Dick Schofield	134	479	120	.251	9	46
LF	Jack Howell	138	449	110	.245	23	64
CF	Gary Pettis	133	394	82	.208	1	17
RF	Devon White	159	639	168	.263	24	87
DH	Brian Downing	155	567	154	.272	29	77

==== Other batters ====
Note: G = Games played; AB = At bats; H = Hits; Avg. = Batting average; HR = Home runs; RBI = Runs batted in

Player	G	AB	H	Avg.	HR	RBI
Ruppert Jones	85	192	47	.245	8	28
Bill Buckner	57	183	56	.306	3	32
George Hendrick	65	162	39	.241	5	25
Gus Polidor	63	137	36	.263	2	15
Johnny Ray	30	127	44	.346	0	15
Darrell Miller	53	108	26	.241	4	16
Mark Ryal	58	100	20	.200	5	18
Butch Wynegar	31	92	19	.207	0	5
Tony Armas	28	81	16	.198	3	9
Jack Fimple	13	10	2	.200	0	1
Jim Eppard	8	9	3	.333	0	0
Tack Wilson	7	2	1	.500	0	0

=== Starting pitchers ===
Note: G = Games pitched; IP = Innings pitched; W = Wins; L = Losses; ERA = Earned run average; SO = Strikeouts

Player	G	IP	W	L	ERA	SO
Mike Witt	36	297.0	16	14	4.01	192
Don Sutton	35	191.2	11	11	4.70	99
John Candelaria	20	116.2	8	6	4.71	74
Jerry Reuss	17	82.1	4	5	5.25	37
Kirk McCaskill	14	74.2	4	6	5.67	56

==== Other pitchers ====
Note: G = Games pitched; IP = Innings pitched; W = Wins; L = Losses; ERA = Earned run average; SO = Strikeouts

Player	G	IP	W	L	ERA	SO
Willie Fraser	36	176.2	10	10	3.92	106
Jack Lazorko	26	117.2	5	6	4.59	55
Urbano Lugo	7	28.0	0	2	9.32	24

===== Relief pitchers =====
Note: G = Games pitched; W = Wins; L = Losses; SV = Saves; ERA = Earned run average; SO = Strikeouts

Player	G	W	L	SV	ERA	SO
DeWayne Buice	57	6	7	17	3.39	109
Greg Minton	41	5	4	10	3.08	35
Gary Lucas	48	1	5	3	3.63	44
Chuck Finley	35	2	7	0	4.67	63
Mike Cook	16	1	2	0	5.50	27
Donnie Moore	14	2	2	5	2.70	17
Bryan Harvey	3	0	0	0	0.00	3
Miguel García	1	0	0	0	16.20	0

== Farm system ==
Level	Team	League	Manager
AAA	Edmonton Trappers	Pacific Coast League	Tom Kotchman
AA	Midland Angels	Texas League	Mako Oliveras
A	Palm Springs Angels	California League	Bill Lachemann
A	Quad Cities Angels	Midwest League	Eddie Rodríguez
A-Short Season	Salem Angels	Northwest League	Chris Smith

Records
Preceded by 1986	California Angels seasons 1987	Succeeded by 1988
