= Bill Fulton (baseball) =

American baseball player (born 1963)

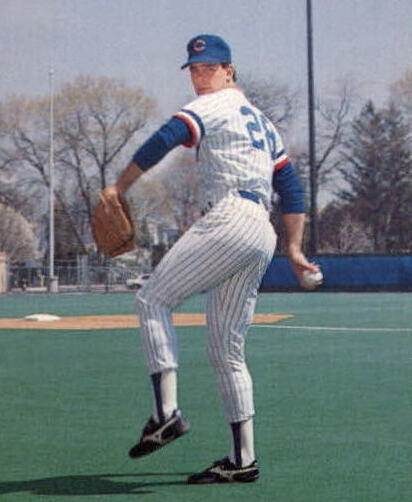
- Fulton with the Columbus Clippers c. 1988
- Pitcher
- Born: October 22, 1963; Pittsburgh, Pennsylvania, U.S.
- Batted: Right Threw: Right

MLB debut
- September 12, 1987, for the New York Yankees

Last MLB appearance
- September 28, 1987, for the New York Yankees

MLB statistics
- Win–loss record: 1–0
- Earned run average: 11.57
- Strikeouts: 2
- Stats at Baseball Reference

Teams
- New York Yankees (1987)

William David Fulton (born October 22, 1963) is an American former pitcher in Major League Baseball. He played for the New York Yankees for three total games during the 1987 season. He had a career 11.57 earned run average in 4.2 innings pitched. Fulton played collegiately at Pensacola Junior College.
