= 1987 Seattle Mariners season =

1987 Seattle Mariners
- League: American League
- Division: West
- Ballpark: Kingdome
- City: Seattle, Washington
- Record: 78–84 (.481)
- Divisional place: 4th
- Owners: George Argyros
- General managers: Dick Balderson
- Managers: Dick Williams
- Television: KSTW-TV 11
- Radio: KIRO 710 AM (Dave Niehaus, Rick Rizzs, Joe Simpson)

The Seattle Mariners 1987 season was their 11th since the franchise creation, and ended the season finishing fourth in the American League West with a record of 78–84 (.481).

== Offseason ==
- December 5, 1986: The Mariners traded a player to be named later to the Pittsburgh Pirates for Rick Rentería. The Mariners completed the deal by sending Bob Siegel (minors) to the Pirates on December 10.
- December 10, 1986: Danny Tartabull and Rick Luecken were traded by the Mariners to the Kansas City Royals for Scott Bankhead, Steve Shields, and Mike Kingery.
- December 17, 1986: Ricky Nelson was traded by the Mariners to the New York Mets for Doug Gwosdz.
- March 31, 1987: Pete Ladd was released by the Mariners.

== Regular season ==
=== Season standings ===
AL West
Team	W	L	Pct.	GB	Home	Road
Minnesota Twins	85	77	.525	—	56‍–‍25	29‍–‍52
Kansas City Royals	83	79	.512	2	46‍–‍35	37‍–‍44
Oakland Athletics	81	81	.500	4	42‍–‍39	39‍–‍42
Seattle Mariners	78	84	.481	7	40‍–‍41	38‍–‍43
Chicago White Sox	77	85	.475	8	38‍–‍43	39‍–‍42
Texas Rangers	75	87	.463	10	43‍–‍38	32‍–‍49
California Angels	75	87	.463	10	38‍–‍43	37‍–‍44

=== Record vs. opponents ===
1987 American League record Sources:
Team	BAL	BOS	CAL	CWS	CLE	DET	KC	MIL	MIN	NYY	OAK	SEA	TEX	TOR
Baltimore	—	1–12	9–3	8–4	7–6	4–9	9–3	2–11	5–7	3–10	7–5	4–8	7–5	1–12
Boston	12–1	—	4–8	3–9	7–6	2–11	6–6	6–7	7–5	7–6	4–8	7–5	7–5	6–7
California	3–9	8–4	—	8–5	7–5	3–9	5–8	7–5	8–5	3–9	6–7	7–6	5–8	5–7
Chicago	4–8	9–3	5–8	—	7–5	3–9	6–7	6–6	6–7	5–7	9–4	6–7	7–6	4–8
Cleveland	6–7	6–7	5–7	5–7	—	4–9	6–6	4–9	3–9	6–7	4–8	5–7	2–10	5–8
Detroit	9–4	11–2	9–3	9–3	9–4	—	5–7	6–7	8–4	5–8	5–7	7–5	8–4	7–6
Kansas City	3–9	6–6	8–5	7–6	6–6	7–5	—	4–8	8–5	5–7	5–8	9–4	7–6	8–4
Milwaukee	11–2	7–6	5–7	6–6	9–4	7–6	8–4	—	3–9	7–6	6–6	4–8	9–3	9–4
Minnesota	7–5	5–7	5–8	7–6	9–3	4–8	5–8	9–3	—	6–6	10–3	9–4	6–7	3–9
New York	10–3	6–7	9–3	7–5	7–6	8–5	7–5	6–7	6–6	—	5–7	7–5	5–7	6–7
Oakland	5–7	8–4	7–6	4–9	8–4	7–5	8–5	6–6	3–10	7–5	—	5–8	6–7	7–5
Seattle	8–4	5–7	6–7	7–6	7–5	5–7	4–9	8–4	4–9	5–7	8–5	—	9–4	2–10
Texas	5–7	5–7	8–5	6–7	10–2	4–8	6–7	3–9	7–6	7–5	7–6	4–9	—	3–9
Toronto	12–1	7–6	7–5	8–4	8–5	6–7	4–8	4–9	9–3	7–6	5–7	10–2	9–3	—

=== Notable transactions ===
- May 12, 1987: Mark Huismann was traded by the Mariners to the Cleveland Indians for Dave Gallagher.
- June 2, 1987: 1987 Major League Baseball draft
  - Ken Griffey Jr. was drafted by the Seattle Mariners in the 1st round (1st pick).
  - Pat Listach was drafted by the Mariners in the 23rd round, but did not sign.

=== Roster ===
1987 Seattle Mariners
Roster
Pitchers: 15 Scott Bankhead; 47 Mike Brown; 54 Mike Campbell; 37 Stan Clarke; 36 Lee Guetterman; 27 Mark Huismann; 12 Mark Langston; 19 Rich Monteleone; 25 Mike Moore; 16 Mike Morgan; 30 Edwin Núñez; 27 Clay Parker; 48 Dennis Powell; 31 Jerry Reed; 40 Steve Shields; 49 Roy Thomas; 43 Mike Trujillo; 13 Bill Wilkinson	Catchers: 9 Scott Bradley; 11 Bob Kearney; 38 Jerry Narron; 10 Dave Valle; Infielders: 21 Alvin Davis; 5 Mario Díaz; 11 Edgar Martínez; 44 Ken Phelps; 17 Jim Presley; 51 Rey Quiñones; 3 Domingo Ramos; 1 Rick Rentería; 4 Harold Reynolds; 35 Brick Smith	Outfielders: 29 Phil Bradley; 14 Mickey Brantley; 42 John Christensen; 20 Dave Hengel; 7 Mike Kingery; 26 John Moses; 6 Donell Nixon; 46 Jim Weaver; Other batters: 36 Gary Matthews	Manager: 23 Dick Williams; Coaches: 36 Billy Connors; 33 Frank Howard; 24 Phil Roof; 28 Bobby Tolan; 32 Ozzie Virgil

== Player stats ==
= Indicates team leader

=== Batting ===
==== Starters by position ====
Note: Pos = Position; G = Games played; AB = At bats; H = Hits; Avg. = Batting average; HR = Home runs; RBI = Runs batted in

Pos	Player	G	AB	H	Avg.	HR	RBI
C	Scott Bradley	102	342	95	.278	5	43
1B	Alvin Davis	157	580	171	.295	29	100
2B	Harold Reynolds	160	530	146	.275	1	35
3B	Jim Presley	152	575	142	.247	24	88
SS	Rey Quiñones	135	478	132	.276	12	56
LF	Phil Bradley	158	603	179	.297	14	67
CF	John Moses	116	390	96	.246	3	38
RF	Mike Kingery	120	354	99	.280	9	52
DH	Ken Phelps	120	332	86	.259	27	68

==== Other batters ====
Note: G = Games played; AB = At bats; H = Hits; Avg. = Batting average; HR = Home runs; RBI = Runs batted in

Player	G	AB	H	Avg.	HR	RBI
Mickey Brantley	92	351	106	.302	14	54
Dave Valle	95	324	83	.256	12	53
Donell Nixon	46	132	33	.250	3	12
John Christensen	53	132	32	.242	2	12
Gary Matthews	45	119	28	.235	3	15
Domingo Ramos	42	103	32	.311	2	11
Bob Kearney	24	47	8	.170	0	1
Edgar Martínez	13	43	16	.372	0	5
Mario Díaz	11	23	7	.304	0	3
Dave Hengel	10	19	6	.316	1	4
Rick Rentería	12	10	1	.100	0	0
Brick Smith	5	8	1	.125	0	0
Jerry Narron	4	8	0	.000	0	0
Jim Weaver	7	4	0	.000	0	0

=== Pitching ===
==== Starting pitchers ====
Note: G = Games pitched; IP = Innings pitched; W = Wins; L = Losses; ERA = Earned run average; SO = Strikeouts

Player	G	IP	W	L	ERA	SO
Mark Langston	35	272.0	19	13	3.84	262
Mike Moore	33	231.0	9	19	4.71	115
Mike Morgan	34	207.0	12	17	4.65	85
Scott Bankhead	27	149.1	9	8	5.42	95
Mike Campbell	9	49.1	1	4	4.74	35

==== Other pitchers ====
Note: G = Games pitched; IP = Innings pitched; W = Wins; L = Losses; ERA = Earned run average; SO = Strikeouts

Player	G	IP	W	L	ERA	SO
Lee Guetterman	25	113.1	11	4	3.81	42
Mike Trujillo	28	65.2	4	4	6.17	36
Dennis Powell	16	34.1	1	3	3.15	17
Clay Parker	3	7.2	0	0	10.57	8

==== Relief pitchers ====
Note: G = Games pitched; W = Wins; L = Losses; SV = Saves; ERA = Earned run average; SO = Strikeouts

Player	G	W	L	SV	ERA	SO
Edwin Núñez	48	3	4	12	3.80	34
Bill Wilkinson	56	3	4	10	3.66	73
Jerry Reed	39	1	2	7	3.42	51
Stan Clarke	22	2	2	0	5.48	13
Steve Shields	20	2	0	3	6.60	22
Roy Thomas	8	1	0	0	5.23	14
Mark Huismann	6	0	0	0	4.91	15
Rich Monteleone	3	0	0	0	6.43	2
Mike Brown	1	0	0	0	5.40	0

== Awards and honors ==
- Mark Langston – American League Leader, Strikeouts (262)

All-Star Game

== Farm system ==
Level	Team	League	Manager
AAA	Calgary Cannons	Pacific Coast League	Bill Plummer
AA	Chattanooga Lookouts	Southern League	Sal Rende
A	Salinas Spurs	California League	Greg Mahlberg
A	Wausau Timbers	Midwest League	Bobby Cuellar
A-Short Season	Bellingham Mariners	Northwest League	Rick Sweet
