= 1987 New York Yankees season =

Season for the Major League Baseball team the New York Yankees

1987 New York Yankees
- League: American League
- Division: East
- Ballpark: Yankee Stadium
- City: New York City
- Record: 89-73 (.549)
- Owners: George Steinbrenner
- General managers: Woody Woodward
- Managers: Lou Piniella
- Television: WPIX (Phil Rizzuto, Bill White, Billy Martin); SportsChannel NY (Ken Harrelson, Spencer Ross, Mickey Mantle)
- Radio: WABC (AM) (Hank Greenwald, Tommy Hutton)

The 1987 New York Yankees season was the 85th season for the Yankees. The team finished in fourth place with a record of 89–73, finishing 9 games behind the Detroit Tigers. New York was managed by Lou Piniella. The Yankees played at Yankee Stadium.

== Offseason ==
- November 26, 1986: Doug Drabek, Brian Fisher, and Logan Easley were traded by the Yankees to the Pittsburgh Pirates for Rick Rhoden, Pat Clements and Cecilio Guante.
- December 17, 1986: Lenn Sakata was signed as a free agent with the New York Yankees.
- December 19, 1986: Ron Romanick was traded by the California Angels with a player to be named later to the New York Yankees for a player to be named later and Butch Wynegar.
- January 5, 1987: Scott Nielsen and Mike Soper (minors) were traded by the Yankees to the Chicago White Sox for Randy Velarde and Pete Filson.
- January 8, 1987: Willie Randolph was signed as a free agent by the Yankees.
- February 13, 1987: Rick Cerone was signed as a free agent by the Yankees.

== Regular season ==
The Yankees hit 10 grand slams, the most by an MLB team in 1987. Six of those were hit by Don Mattingly, who set a record for most grand slam home runs in one season with six. His record was matched by Travis Hafner during the 2006 season. Mattingly's grand slams in 1987 were also the only six grand slams of his career. In addition, Mattingly had tied Dale Long's major league record by hitting home runs in eight consecutive games (record later tied again by Ken Griffey Jr., of Seattle in 1993), as well as stroking an extra base hit in ten consecutive games. Mattingly had a record 10 home runs during this streak (Long & Griffey had eight of them).

MLB-record six Grand Slams in one season 1
#	Date	Against	Pitcher	Venue	Score
1	May 14	Texas Rangers	Mike Mason	Yankee Stadium	9–1 W
2	Jun 29	Toronto Blue Jays	John Cerutti	Exhibition Stadium	15–14 W
3	Jul 10	Chicago White Sox	Joel McKeon	Yankee Stadium	9–5 W
4	Jul 16	Texas Rangers	Charlie Hough	Arlington Stadium	12–3 W
5	Sep 25	Baltimore Orioles	José Mesa	Memorial Stadium	8–4 W
6	Sep 29	Boston Red Sox	Bruce Hurst	Yankee Stadium	6–0 W

In June 1987, it was reported that Mattingly injured his back during some clubhouse horseplay with pitcher Bob Shirley though both denied this. Nevertheless, he finished with a .327 batting average, 30 home runs, and 115 RBIs, his fourth straight year with at least 110 RBIs.

On July 13, 1987, George Steinbrenner told manager Lou Piniella that the acquisition of Steve Trout would win the Yankees the pennant. Trout never won a game for the Yankees, going 0–4 in 14 games.

=== Season standings ===
AL East
Team	W	L	Pct.	GB	Home	Road
Detroit Tigers	98	64	.605	—	54‍–‍27	44‍–‍37
Toronto Blue Jays	96	66	.593	2	52‍–‍29	44‍–‍37
Milwaukee Brewers	91	71	.562	7	48‍–‍33	43‍–‍38
New York Yankees	89	73	.549	9	51‍–‍30	38‍–‍43
Boston Red Sox	78	84	.481	20	50‍–‍30	28‍–‍54
Baltimore Orioles	67	95	.414	31	31‍–‍51	36‍–‍44
Cleveland Indians	61	101	.377	37	35‍–‍46	26‍–‍55

=== Record vs. opponents ===
1987 American League record Sources:
Team	BAL	BOS	CAL	CWS	CLE	DET	KC	MIL	MIN	NYY	OAK	SEA	TEX	TOR
Baltimore	—	1–12	9–3	8–4	7–6	4–9	9–3	2–11	5–7	3–10	7–5	4–8	7–5	1–12
Boston	12–1	—	4–8	3–9	7–6	2–11	6–6	6–7	7–5	7–6	4–8	7–5	7–5	6–7
California	3–9	8–4	—	8–5	7–5	3–9	5–8	7–5	8–5	3–9	6–7	7–6	5–8	5–7
Chicago	4–8	9–3	5–8	—	7–5	3–9	6–7	6–6	6–7	5–7	9–4	6–7	7–6	4–8
Cleveland	6–7	6–7	5–7	5–7	—	4–9	6–6	4–9	3–9	6–7	4–8	5–7	2–10	5–8
Detroit	9–4	11–2	9–3	9–3	9–4	—	5–7	6–7	8–4	5–8	5–7	7–5	8–4	7–6
Kansas City	3–9	6–6	8–5	7–6	6–6	7–5	—	4–8	8–5	5–7	5–8	9–4	7–6	8–4
Milwaukee	11–2	7–6	5–7	6–6	9–4	7–6	8–4	—	3–9	7–6	6–6	4–8	9–3	9–4
Minnesota	7–5	5–7	5–8	7–6	9–3	4–8	5–8	9–3	—	6–6	10–3	9–4	6–7	3–9
New York	10–3	6–7	9–3	7–5	7–6	8–5	7–5	6–7	6–6	—	5–7	7–5	5–7	6–7
Oakland	5–7	8–4	7–6	4–9	8–4	7–5	8–5	6–6	3–10	7–5	—	5–8	6–7	7–5
Seattle	8–4	5–7	6–7	7–6	7–5	5–7	4–9	8–4	4–9	5–7	8–5	—	9–4	2–10
Texas	5–7	5–7	8–5	6–7	10–2	4–8	6–7	3–9	7–6	7–5	7–6	4–9	—	3–9
Toronto	12–1	7–6	7–5	8–4	8–5	6–7	4–8	4–9	9–3	7–6	5–7	10–2	9–3	—

=== Notable transactions ===
- April 10, 1987: Rich Bordi was signed as a free agent by the Yankees.
- May 15, 1987: Rafael Quirico was signed as an amateur free agent by the Yankees.
- June 10, 1987: Keith Hughes and Shane Turner were traded by the Yankees to the Philadelphia Phillies for Mike Easler.
- June 22, 1987: Alan Mills was sent by the California Angels to the New York Yankees to complete an earlier deal made on December 19, 1986.
- July 13, 1987: Bob Tewksbury, Rich Scheid, and Dean Wilkins were traded by the Yankees to the Chicago Cubs for Steve Trout.
- August 26, 1987: Dennis Rasmussen was traded by the Yankees to the Cincinnati Reds for Bill Gullickson.
- August 26, 1987: Ken Patterson and a player to be named later were traded by the Yankees to the Chicago White Sox for Jerry Royster and Mike Soper (minors). The New York Yankees completed the deal by sending Jeff Pries (minors) to the White Sox on September 19.
- September 17, 1987: Sherman Obando was signed as an amateur free agent by the Yankees.

=== Roster ===
1987 New York Yankees
Roster
Pitchers: 48 Neil Allen; 36,54 Brad Arnsberg; 46 Rich Bordi; 29,38 Pat Clements; 47 Pete Filson; 64 Bill Fulton; 51,54 Cecilio Guante; 49 Ron Guidry; 45 Bill Gullickson; 29 Al Holland; 41 Charles Hudson; 25 Tommy John; 56 Al Leiter; 39 Joe Niekro; 45 Dennis Rasmussen; 26 Rick Rhoden; 19 Dave Righetti; 29 Bob Shirley; 43 Tim Stoddard; 35 Bob Tewksbury; 35 Steve Trout	Catchers: 6 Rick Cerone; 61 Phil Lombardi; 27 Mark Salas; 12 Joel Skinner; Infielders: 57 Juan Bonilla; 53 Orestes Destrade; 23 Don Mattingly; 20 Bob Meacham; 36 Jeff Moronko; 13 Mike Pagliarulo; 30 Willie Randolph; 46 Jerry Royster; 11 Lenn Sakata; 2 Wayne Tolleson; 29 Randy Velarde; 17,29 Paul Zuvella	Outfielders: 54 Jay Buhner; 28 Henry Cotto; 17 Mike Easler; 24 Rickey Henderson; 39 Roberto Kelly; 33 Ron Kittle; 21 Dan Pasqua; 22 Gary Ward; 18 Claudell Washington; 31 Dave Winfield; Other batters: 27 Keith Hughes	Manager: 14 Lou Piniella; Coaches: 52 Mark Connor; 34 Mike Ferraro; 42 Stump Merrill; 44 Jeff Torborg; 50 Jay Ward; 40 Stan Williams

== Player stats ==
= Indicates team leader

=== Batting ===
==== Starters by position ====
Note: Pos = Position; G = Games played; AB = At bats; H = Hits; Avg. = Batting average; HR = Home runs; RBI = Runs batted in

Pos	Player	G	AB	H	Avg.	HR	RBI
C	Rick Cerone	113	284	69	.243	4	23
1B	Don Mattingly	141	569	186	.327	30	115
2B	Willie Randolph	120	449	137	.305	7	67
3B	Mike Pagliarulo	150	522	122	.234	32	87
SS	Wayne Tolleson	121	349	77	.221	1	22
LF	Gary Ward	146	529	131	.248	16	78
CF	Claudell Washington	102	312	87	.279	9	44
RF	Dave Winfield	156	575	158	.275	27	97
DH	Ron Kittle	59	159	44	.277	12	28

==== Other batters ====
Note: G = Games played; AB = At bats; H = Hits; Avg. = Batting average; HR = Home runs; RBI = Runs batted in

Player	G	AB	H	Avg.	HR	RBI
Rickey Henderson	95	358	104	.291	17	37
Dan Pasqua	113	318	74	.233	17	42
Bob Meacham	77	203	55	.271	5	21
Mike Easler	65	167	47	.281	4	21
Henry Cotto	68	149	35	.235	5	20
Joel Skinner	64	139	19	.137	3	14
Mark Salas	50	115	23	.200	3	12
Juan Bonilla	23	55	14	.255	1	3
Roberto Kelly	23	52	14	.269	1	7
Lenn Sakata	19	45	12	.267	2	4
Jerry Royster	18	42	15	.357	0	4
Paul Zuvella	14	34	6	.176	0	0
Jay Buhner	7	22	5	.227	0	1
Randy Velarde	8	22	4	.182	0	1
Orestes Destrade	9	19	5	.263	0	1
Jeff Moronko	7	11	1	.091	0	0
Phil Lombardi	5	8	1	.125	0	0
Keith Hughes	4	4	0	.000	0	0

=== Pitching ===
==== Starting pitchers ====
Note: G = Games pitched; IP = Innings pitched; W = Wins; L = Losses; ERA = Earned run average; SO = Strikeouts

Player	G	IP	W	L	ERA	SO
Tommy John	33	187.2	13	6	4.03	63
Rick Rhoden	30	181.2	16	10	3.86	107
Dennis Rasmussen	26	146.0	9	7	4.75	89
Ron Guidry	22	117.2	5	8	3.67	96
Joe Niekro	8	50.2	3	4	3.55	30
Bill Gullickson	8	48.0	4	2	4.88	28
Al Leiter	4	22.2	2	2	6.35	28

==== Other pitchers ====
Note: G = Games pitched; IP = Innings pitched; W = Wins; L = Losses; ERA = Earned run average; SO = Strikeouts

Player	G	IP	W	L	ERA	SO
Charles Hudson	35	154.2	11	7	3.61	100
Steve Trout	14	46.1	0	4	6.60	27
Bob Tewksbury	8	33.1	1	4	6.75	12
Pete Filson	7	22.0	1	0	3.27	10
Brad Arnsberg	6	19.1	1	3	5.59	14

==== Relief pitchers ====
Note: G = Games pitched; W = Wins; L = Losses; SV = Saves; ERA = Earned run average; SO = Strikeouts

Player	G	W	L	SV	ERA	SO
Dave Righetti	60	8	6	31	3.51	77
Tim Stoddard	57	4	3	8	3.50	78
Pat Clements	55	3	3	7	4.95	36
Cecilio Guante	23	3	2	1	5.73	46
Rich Bordi	16	3	1	0	7.64	23
Bob Shirley	12	1	0	0	4.50	12
Neil Allen	8	0	1	0	3.65	16
Al Holland	3	0	0	0	14.21	5
Bill Fulton	3	1	0	0	11.57	2
Rick Cerone	2	0	0	0	0.00	1

== Awards and records ==
- Don Mattingly, American League record, Most Grand Slams in one season (6)
- Don Mattingly, Silver Slugger Award

MLB-record six Grand Slams in one season 1
#	Date	Against	Pitcher	Venue	Score
1	May 14	Texas Rangers	Mike Mason	Yankee Stadium	9-1 W
2	Jun 29	Toronto Blue Jays	John Cerutti	Exhibition Stadium	15-14 W
3	Jul 10	Chicago White Sox	Joel McKeon	Yankee Stadium	9-5 W
4	Jul 16	Texas Rangers	Charlie Hough	Arlington Stadium	12-3 W
5	Sep 25	Baltimore Orioles	José Mesa	Memorial Stadium	8-4 W
6	Sep 29	Boston Red Sox	Bruce Hurst	Yankee Stadium	6-0 W

== Farm system ==
Level	Team	League	Manager
AAA	Columbus Clippers	International League	Bucky Dent
AA	Albany-Colonie Yankees	Eastern League	Tommy Jones
A	Prince William Cannons	Carolina League	Wally Moon
A	Fort Lauderdale Yankees	Florida State League	Buck Showalter
A-Short Season	Oneonta Yankees	New York–Penn League	Gary Allenson
Rookie	GCL Yankees	Gulf Coast League	Fred Ferreira

LEAGUE CHAMPIONS: Columbus, Fort Lauderdale
