= 1987 Boston Red Sox season =

MLB baseball season

1987 Boston Red Sox
- League: American League
- Division: East
- Ballpark: Fenway Park
- City: Boston, Massachusetts
- Record: 78–84 (.481)
- Divisional place: 5th
- Owners: Jean Yawkey, Haywood Sullivan
- President: Jean Yawkey
- General manager: Lou Gorman
- Manager: John McNamara
- Television: WSBK-TV, Ch. 38; NESN (Ned Martin, Bob Montgomery)
- Radio: WPLM-FM 99.1; WPLM-AM 1390 (Ken Coleman, Joe Castiglione)
- Stats: ESPN.com; Baseball Reference

The 1987 Boston Red Sox season was the 87th season in the franchise's Major League Baseball history. The Red Sox finished fifth in the American League East with a record of 78 wins and 84 losses, 20 games behind the Detroit Tigers.

== Regular season ==
Record by month
| Month | Record | | Cumulative | | AL East | | Ref. |
| Month | Won | Lost | Won | Lost | Position | GB | Ref. |
|---|---|---|---|---|---|---|---|
| April | 9 | 13 | 9 | 13 | 6th | 9 1/2 | |
| May | 13 | 14 | 22 | 27 | 6th | 9 | |
| June | 15 | 12 | 37 | 39 | 5th | 10 1/2 | |
| July | 11 | 15 | 48 | 54 | 5th | 14 1/2 | |
| August | 14 | 13 | 62 | 67 | 5th | 15 | |
| September | 13 | 16 | 75 | 83 | 5th | 20 1/2 | |
| October | 3 | 1 | 78 | 84 | 5th | 20 | |

=== Highlights ===
- June 29, 1987: Wade Boggs had a grand slam, a triple, and seven RBIs in a game against the Baltimore Orioles.

=== Season standings ===
AL East
| Team | W | L | Pct. | GB | Home | Road |
|---|---|---|---|---|---|---|
| Detroit Tigers | 98 | 64 | .605 | — | 54‍–‍27 | 44‍–‍37 |
| Toronto Blue Jays | 96 | 66 | .593 | 2 | 52‍–‍29 | 44‍–‍37 |
| Milwaukee Brewers | 91 | 71 | .562 | 7 | 48‍–‍33 | 43‍–‍38 |
| New York Yankees | 89 | 73 | .549 | 9 | 51‍–‍30 | 38‍–‍43 |
| Boston Red Sox | 78 | 84 | .481 | 20 | 50‍–‍30 | 28‍–‍54 |
| Baltimore Orioles | 67 | 95 | .414 | 31 | 31‍–‍51 | 36‍–‍44 |
| Cleveland Indians | 61 | 101 | .377 | 37 | 35‍–‍46 | 26‍–‍55 |

=== Record vs. opponents ===
1987 American League record Sources:
| Team | BAL | BOS | CAL | CWS | CLE | DET | KC | MIL | MIN | NYY | OAK | SEA | TEX | TOR |
|---|---|---|---|---|---|---|---|---|---|---|---|---|---|---|
| Baltimore | — | 1–12 | 9–3 | 8–4 | 7–6 | 4–9 | 9–3 | 2–11 | 5–7 | 3–10 | 7–5 | 4–8 | 7–5 | 1–12 |
| Boston | 12–1 | — | 4–8 | 3–9 | 7–6 | 2–11 | 6–6 | 6–7 | 7–5 | 7–6 | 4–8 | 7–5 | 7–5 | 6–7 |
| California | 3–9 | 8–4 | — | 8–5 | 7–5 | 3–9 | 5–8 | 7–5 | 8–5 | 3–9 | 6–7 | 7–6 | 5–8 | 5–7 |
| Chicago | 4–8 | 9–3 | 5–8 | — | 7–5 | 3–9 | 6–7 | 6–6 | 6–7 | 5–7 | 9–4 | 6–7 | 7–6 | 4–8 |
| Cleveland | 6–7 | 6–7 | 5–7 | 5–7 | — | 4–9 | 6–6 | 4–9 | 3–9 | 6–7 | 4–8 | 5–7 | 2–10 | 5–8 |
| Detroit | 9–4 | 11–2 | 9–3 | 9–3 | 9–4 | — | 5–7 | 6–7 | 8–4 | 5–8 | 5–7 | 7–5 | 8–4 | 7–6 |
| Kansas City | 3–9 | 6–6 | 8–5 | 7–6 | 6–6 | 7–5 | — | 4–8 | 8–5 | 5–7 | 5–8 | 9–4 | 7–6 | 8–4 |
| Milwaukee | 11–2 | 7–6 | 5–7 | 6–6 | 9–4 | 7–6 | 8–4 | — | 3–9 | 7–6 | 6–6 | 4–8 | 9–3 | 9–4 |
| Minnesota | 7–5 | 5–7 | 5–8 | 7–6 | 9–3 | 4–8 | 5–8 | 9–3 | — | 6–6 | 10–3 | 9–4 | 6–7 | 3–9 |
| New York | 10–3 | 6–7 | 9–3 | 7–5 | 7–6 | 8–5 | 7–5 | 6–7 | 6–6 | — | 5–7 | 7–5 | 5–7 | 6–7 |
| Oakland | 5–7 | 8–4 | 7–6 | 4–9 | 8–4 | 7–5 | 8–5 | 6–6 | 3–10 | 7–5 | — | 5–8 | 6–7 | 7–5 |
| Seattle | 8–4 | 5–7 | 6–7 | 7–6 | 7–5 | 5–7 | 4–9 | 8–4 | 4–9 | 5–7 | 8–5 | — | 9–4 | 2–10 |
| Texas | 5–7 | 5–7 | 8–5 | 6–7 | 10–2 | 4–8 | 6–7 | 3–9 | 7–6 | 7–5 | 7–6 | 4–9 | — | 3–9 |
| Toronto | 12–1 | 7–6 | 7–5 | 8–4 | 8–5 | 6–7 | 4–8 | 4–9 | 9–3 | 7–6 | 5–7 | 10–2 | 9–3 | — |

=== Notable transactions ===
- July 23, 1987: Bill Buckner was released by the Red Sox.
- August 21, 1987: Glenn Hoffman was traded by the Red Sox to the Los Angeles Dodgers for a player to be named later (minor league player Billy Bartels).
- September 1, 1987: Don Baylor was traded by the Red Sox to the Minnesota Twins for a player to be named later (minor league player Enrique Rios).
- September 1, 1987: Dave Henderson was traded by the Red Sox to the San Francisco Giants for a player to be named later (Randy Kutcher).

=== Opening Day lineup ===
| 26 | Wade Boggs | 3B |
| 17 | Marty Barrett | 2B |
| 6 | Bill Buckner | 1B |
| 14 | Jim Rice | LF |
| 25 | Don Baylor | DH |
| 24 | Dwight Evans | RF |
| 42 | Dave Henderson | CF |
| 15 | Marc Sullivan | C |
| 7 | Spike Owen | SS |
| 46 | Bob Stanley | P |

=== Alumni game ===
On May 23, the Red Sox held an old-timers game, before a scheduled home game with the Chicago White Sox. The game was themed to celebrate the 75th anniversary of Fenway Park. The Red Sox team included Jim Lonborg, Jimmy Piersall, Luis Tiant, and Ted Williams; they were defeated by a team of other MLB alumni, including Cleveland Indians Hall of Fame inductee Bob Feller, Detroit Tigers pitcher Mark Fidrych, and slugger Dick Allen.

=== Roster ===
1987 Boston Red Sox
Roster
| Pitchers: 50 Tom Bolton; 23 Oil Can Boyd; 21 Roger Clemens; 28 Steve Crawford; 44 Wes Gardner; 47 Bruce Hurst; 22 John Leister; 49 Al Nipper; 43 Joe Sambito; 31 Calvin Schiraldi; 19 Jeff Sellers; 46 Bob Stanley; 45 Rob Woodward | Catchers: 10 Rich Gedman; 37 John Marzano; 12 Dave Sax; 29 Danny Sheaffer; 15 Marc Sullivan; Infielders: 17 Marty Barrett; 26 Wade Boggs; 6 Bill Buckner; 27 Pat Dodson; 24 Dwight Evans; 18 Glenn Hoffman; 7 Spike Owen; 52 Jody Reed; 11 Ed Romero | Outfielders: 38 Todd Benzinger; 12 Ellis Burks; 39 Mike Greenwell; 42 Dave Henderson; 14 Jim Rice; 16 Kevin Romine; Other batters: 25 Don Baylor; 30 Sam Horn | Manager: 1 John McNamara; Coaches: 34 Bill Fischer (Pitching); 33 Walt Hriniak (Hitting & First base); 35 Joe Morgan (Third base); 36 Rac Slider (Bullpen) |

== Player stats ==
=== Batting ===
Note: G = Games played; AB = At bats; R = Runs; H = Hits; 2B = Doubles; 3B = Triples; HR = Home runs; RBI = Runs batted in; SB = Stolen bases; BB = Walks; AVG = Batting average; SLG = Slugging average

| Player | G | AB | R | H | 2B | 3B | HR | RBI | SB | BB | AVG | SLG |
|---|---|---|---|---|---|---|---|---|---|---|---|---|
| Marty Barrett | 137 | 559 | 72 | 164 | 23 | 0 | 3 | 43 | 15 | 51 | .293 | .351 |
| Ellis Burks | 133 | 558 | 94 | 152 | 30 | 2 | 20 | 59 | 27 | 41 | .272 | .441 |
| Wade Boggs | 147 | 551 | 108 | 200 | 40 | 6 | 24 | 89 | 1 | 105 | .363 | .588 |
| Dwight Evans | 154 | 541 | 109 | 165 | 37 | 2 | 34 | 123 | 4 | 106 | .305 | .569 |
| Spike Owen | 132 | 437 | 50 | 113 | 17 | 7 | 2 | 48 | 11 | 53 | .259 | .343 |
| Mike Greenwell | 125 | 412 | 71 | 135 | 31 | 6 | 19 | 89 | 5 | 35 | .328 | .570 |
| Jim Rice | 108 | 404 | 66 | 112 | 14 | 0 | 13 | 62 | 1 | 45 | .277 | .408 |
| Don Baylor | 108 | 339 | 64 | 81 | 8 | 0 | 16 | 57 | 5 | 40 | .239 | .404 |
| Bill Buckner | 75 | 286 | 23 | 78 | 6 | 1 | 2 | 42 | 1 | 13 | .273 | .322 |
| Ed Romero | 88 | 235 | 23 | 64 | 5 | 0 | 0 | 14 | 0 | 18 | .272 | ..294 |
| Todd Benzinger | 73 | 223 | 36 | 62 | 11 | 1 | 8 | 43 | 5 | 22 | .278 | .444 |
| Dave Henderson | 75 | 184 | 30 | 43 | 10 | 0 | 8 | 25 | 1 | 22 | .234 | .418 |
| John Marzano | 52 | 168 | 20 | 41 | 11 | 0 | 5 | 24 | 0 | 7 | .244 | .399 |
| Sam Horn | 46 | 158 | 31 | 44 | 7 | 0 | 14 | 34 | 0 | 17 | .278 | .589 |
| Rich Gedman | 52 | 151 | 11 | 31 | 8 | 0 | 1 | 13 | 0 | 10 | .205 | .278 |
| Danny Sheaffer | 25 | 66 | 5 | 8 | 1 | 0 | 1 | 5 | 0 | 0 | .121 | .182 |
| Glenn Hoffman | 21 | 55 | 5 | 11 | 3 | 0 | 0 | 6 | 0 | 3 | .200 | .255 |
| Pat Dodson | 26 | 42 | 4 | 7 | 3 | 0 | 2 | 6 | 0 | 8 | .167 | .381 |
| Jody Reed | 9 | 30 | 4 | 9 | 1 | 1 | 0 | 8 | 1 | 4 | .300 | .400 |
| Kevin Romine | 9 | 24 | 5 | 7 | 2 | 0 | 0 | 2 | 0 | 2 | .292 | .375 |
| Dave Sax | 2 | 3 | 0 | 0 | 0 | 0 | 0 | 0 | 0 | 0 | .000 | .000 |
| Team totals | 162 | 5586 | 842 | 1554 | 273 | 26 | 174 | 802 | 77 | 606 | .278 | .430 |

=== Pitching ===
Note: W = Wins; L = Losses; ERA = Earned run average; G = Games pitched; GS = Games started; SV = Saves; IP = Innings pitched; H = Hits allowed; R = Runs allowed; ER = Earned runs allowed; BB = Walks allowed; SO = Strikeouts

| Player | W | L | ERA | G | GS | SV | IP | H | R | ER | BB | SO |
|---|---|---|---|---|---|---|---|---|---|---|---|---|
| Roger Clemens | 20 | 9 | 2.97 | 36 | 36 | 0 | 281.2 | 248 | 100 | 93 | 83 | 256 |
| Bruce Hurst | 15 | 13 | 4.41 | 33 | 33 | 0 | 238.2 | 239 | 124 | 117 | 76 | 190 |
| Al Nipper | 11 | 12 | 5.43 | 30 | 30 | 0 | 174.0 | 196 | 115 | 105 | 62 | 89 |
| Bob Stanley | 4 | 15 | 5.01 | 34 | 20 | 0 | 152.2 | 198 | 96 | 85 | 42 | 67 |
| Jeff Sellers | 7 | 8 | 5.28 | 25 | 22 | 0 | 139.2 | 161 | 85 | 82 | 61 | 99 |
| Wes Gardner | 3 | 6 | 5.42 | 49 | 1 | 10 | 89.2 | 98 | 55 | 54 | 42 | 70 |
| Calvin Schiraldi | 8 | 5 | 4.41 | 62 | 1 | 6 | 83.2 | 75 | 45 | 41 | 40 | 93 |
| Steve Crawford | 5 | 4 | 5.33 | 29 | 0 | 0 | 72.2 | 91 | 48 | 43 | 32 | 43 |
| Tom Bolton | 1 | 0 | 4.38 | 29 | 0 | 0 | 61.2 | 83 | 33 | 30 | 27 | 49 |
| Joe Sambito | 2 | 6 | 6.93 | 47 | 0 | 0 | 37.2 | 46 | 29 | 29 | 16 | 35 |
| Rob Woodward | 1 | 1 | 7.05 | 9 | 6 | 0 | 37.0 | 53 | 33 | 29 | 15 | 15 |
| Oil Can Boyd | 1 | 3 | 5.89 | 7 | 7 | 0 | 36.2 | 47 | 31 | 24 | 9 | 12 |
| John Leister | 0 | 2 | 9.20 | 8 | 6 | 0 | 30.1 | 49 | 31 | 31 | 12 | 16 |
| Team totals | 78 | 84 | 4.77 | 162 | 162 | 16 | 1436.0 | 1584 | 825 | 761 | 517 | 1034 |

== Statistical leaders ==
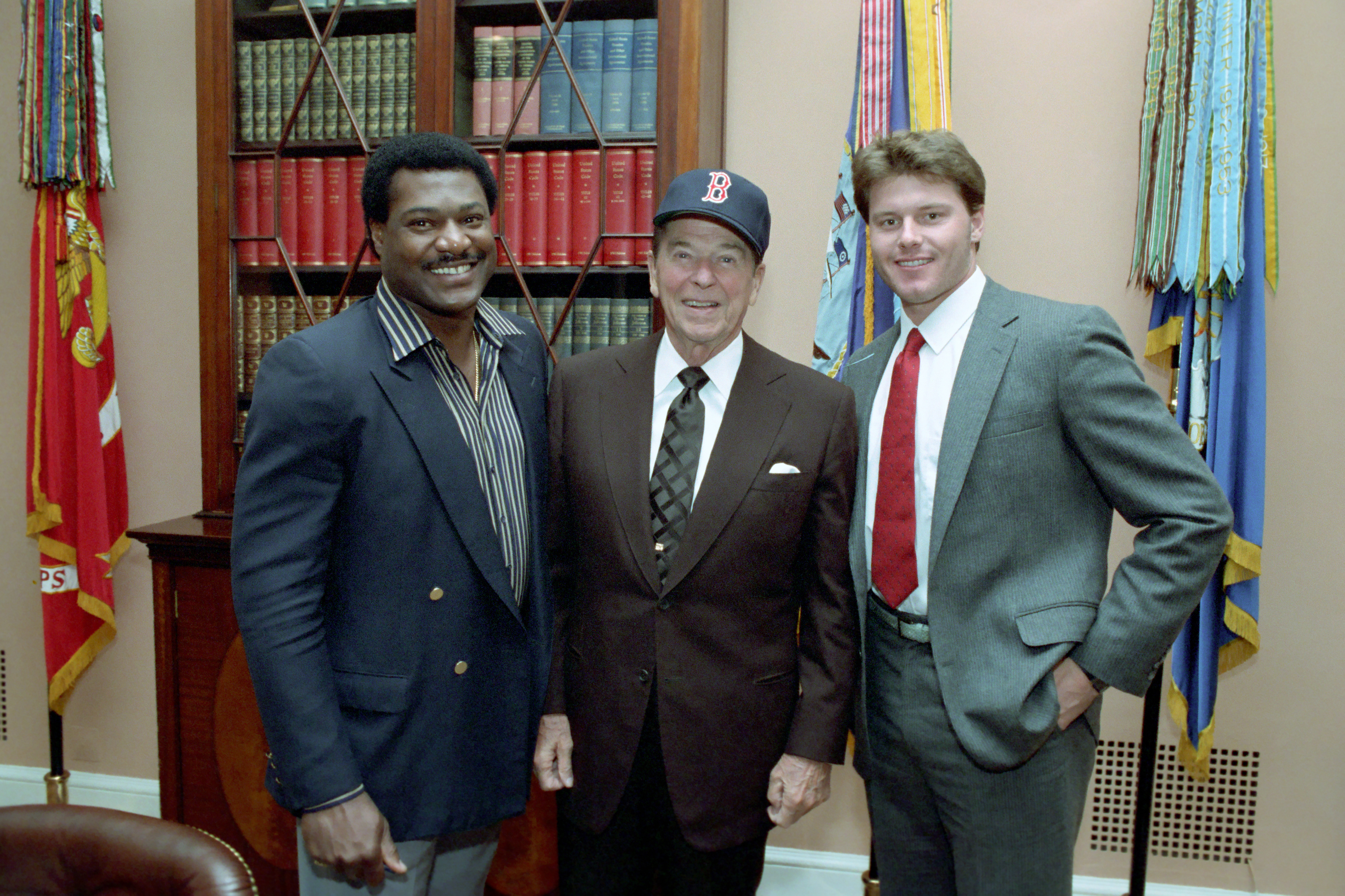
From left: Don Baylor, Ronald Reagan, and Roger Clemens

| Category | Player | Statistic |
|---|---|---|
| Youngest player | Ellis Burks | 22 |
| Oldest player | Don Baylor | 38 |
| Wins Above Replacement | Roger Clemens | 9.4 |

=== Batting ===
| Abbr. | Category | Player | Statistic |
|---|---|---|---|
| G | Games played | Dwight Evans | 154 |
| PA | Plate appearances | Wade Boggs | 667 |
| AB | At bats | Marty Barrett | 559 |
| R | Runs scored | Dwight Evans | 109 |
| H | Hits | Wade Boggs | 200 |
| 2B | Doubles | Wade Boggs | 40 |
| 3B | Triples | Spike Owen | 7 |
| HR | Home runs | Dwight Evans | 34 |
| RBI | Runs batted in | Dwight Evans | 123 |
| SB | Stolen bases | Ellis Burks | 27 |
| CS | Caught stealing | Spike Owen | 8 |
| BB | Base on balls | Dwight Evans | 106 |
| SO | Strikeouts | Dwight Evans | 98 |
| SO | Strikeouts | Ellis Burks | 98 |
| BA | Batting average | Wade Boggs | .363 |
| OBP | On-base percentage | Wade Boggs | .461 |
| SLG | Slugging percentage | Wade Boggs | .588 |
| OPS | On-base plus slugging | Wade Boggs | 1.049 |
| OPS+ | Adjusted OPS | Wade Boggs | 174 |
| TB | Total bases | Wade Boggs | 324 |
| GIDP | Grounded into double play | Jim Rice | 22 |
| HBP | Hit by pitch | Don Baylor | 24 |
| SH | Sacrifice hits | Marty Barrett | 22 |
| SF | Sacrifice flies | Wade Boggs | 8 |
| IBB | Intentional base on balls | Wade Boggs | 19 |

=== Pitching ===
| Abbr. | Category | Player | Statistic |
|---|---|---|---|
| W | Wins | Roger Clemens | 20 |
| L | Losses | Bob Stanley | 15 |
| W-L % | Winning percentage | Roger Clemens | .690 (20–9) |
| ERA | Earned run average | Roger Clemens | 2.97 |
| G | Games pitched | Calvin Schiraldi | 62 |
| GS | Games started | Roger Clemens | 36 |
| GF | Games finished | Calvin Schiraldi | 52 |
| CG | Complete games | Roger Clemens | 18 |
| SHO | Shutouts | Roger Clemens | 7 |
| SV | Saves | Wes Gardner | 10 |
| IP | Innings pitched | Roger Clemens | 281 2/3 |
| SO | Strikeouts | Roger Clemens | 256 |
| WHIP | Walks plus hits per inning pitched | Roger Clemens | 1.175 |

== Awards and honors ==
Awards

- Wade Boggs, Silver Slugger Award (3B), AL Player of the Month (June)
- Roger Clemens, American League Cy Young Award
- Dwight Evans, Silver Slugger Award (OF), AL Player of the Month (August)

Accomplishments

- Wade Boggs, American League Batting Champion, .363
- Wade Boggs, Major League Baseball Leader, On-base percentage (.461)
- Roger Clemens, American League Leader, Complete Games (18)
- Roger Clemens, American League Leader, Shutouts (7)
- Roger Clemens, American League Leader, Wins (20)

All-Star Game

- Wade Boggs, third base, starter
- Dwight Evans, outfield, reserve
- Bruce Hurst, pitcher, reserve

== Farm system ==
| Level | Team | League | Manager |
|---|---|---|---|
| AAA | Pawtucket Red Sox | International League | Ed Nottle |
| AA | New Britain Red Sox | Eastern League | Dave Holt |
| A | Winter Haven Red Sox | Florida State League | Doug Camilli |
| A | Greensboro Hornets | South Atlantic League | Dick Berardino |
| A-Short Season | Elmira Pioneers | New York–Penn League | Bill Limoncelli |
