= Jack O'Connor (pitcher) =

American baseball player (born 1958)

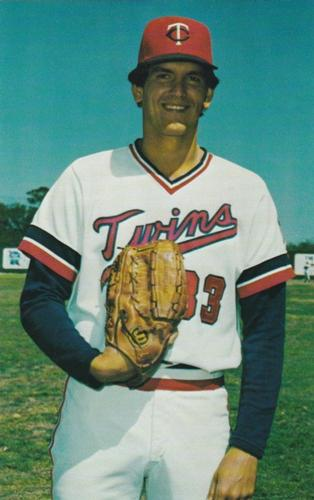
- Pitcher
- Born: June 2, 1958 (age 66); Yucca Valley, California, U.S.
- Batted: Left Threw: Left

MLB debut
- April 9, 1981, for the Minnesota Twins

Last MLB appearance
- October 3, 1987, for the Baltimore Orioles

MLB statistics
- Win–loss record: 14–17
- Earned run average: 4.89
- Strikeouts: 177
- Stats at Baseball Reference

Teams
- Minnesota Twins (1981–1984); Montreal Expos (1985); Baltimore Orioles (1987)

Jack William O'Connor (born June 2, 1958) is an American former Major League Baseball pitcher. He played all or part of six seasons in the majors, between 1981 and 1987.

== Sources ==
- Career statistics from Baseball Reference · Fangraphs · Baseball Reference (Minors) · Retrosheet
