= Juan Berenguer =

Panamanian baseball player (born 1954)

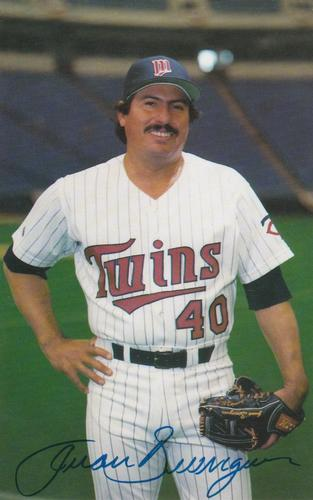
- Berenguer in 1987
- Pitcher
- Born: November 30, 1954 (age 71); Aguadulce, Coclé, Panama
- Batted: Right Threw: Right

MLB debut
- August 17, 1978, for the New York Mets

Last MLB appearance
- October 4, 1992, for the Kansas City Royals

MLB statistics
- Win–loss record: 67–62
- Earned run average: 3.90
- Strikeouts: 975
- Stats at Baseball Reference

Teams
- New York Mets (1978–1980); Kansas City Royals (1981); Toronto Blue Jays (1981); Detroit Tigers (1982–1985); San Francisco Giants (1986); Minnesota Twins (1987–1990); Atlanta Braves (1991–1992); Kansas City Royals (1992)

Career highlights and awards
- 2× World Series champion (1984, 1987)

Juan Bautista Berenguer [beh-ren-gher'] (born November 30, 1954) is a Panamanian former long relief pitcher in Major League Baseball (MLB) who played for eight teams from 1978 to 1992. Listed at 5'11 (1.80 m), 200 lb. (91 k), Berenguer batted and threw right-handed. He was born in Aguadulce, Coclé, Panama.

A mean-looking, husky pitcher with long hair and a mustache, Berenguer was nicknamed 'Pancho Villa' by his teammates, and Twins fans admiringly referred to him as 'Señor Smoke' or 'El Gasolino' due to his mid-90s mph fastball.

Extremely wild as a youngster, Berenguer learned to harness his sneaky fastball which he liked to throw inside, and added a deceptive forkball. His effectiveness was aided by his intimidating appearance and disposition.

Berenguer was signed by the New York Mets as an amateur free agent in 1975. He made his MLB debut with the team in 1978. By April 1981, Berenguer had a 1–4 win–loss record and a 4.75 earned run average (ERA) in 16 career appearances with the team, and he was still having problems controlling his fastball, so the Mets traded him to the Kansas City Royals in exchange for outfielder Marvell Wynne and pitcher John Skinner.

Berenguer pitched for seven organizations before joining the Minnesota Twins. His breakout season came in 1987, when he posted an 8–1 record with a 3.94 ERA and four saves for the American League champion Twins, en route to the 1987 World Championship over the St. Louis Cardinals. During the 1987 playoffs, Juan recorded “The Berenguer Boogie,” a music video that featured Juan dancing and singing in a trench coat and briefcase. Berenguer previously won a World Series ring with the 1984 Champion Detroit Tigers, though he did not play in the Series.

Following his MLB career, Berenguer continued to play in the minors. After spending 1993 and part of 1994 in the Mexican League, he returned to Minnesota and pitched for the independent Minneapolis Loons and Southern Minny Stars in the Prairie League. He then signed to pitch for the Duluth–Superior Dukes of the Northern League prior to the 1998 season, but never played for them. In between, he played winter ball in the Dominican Republic and Venezuela.

After baseball, Berenguer returned to Minnesota, where he worked in marketing for a local television station. He also became a salesman for an automobile dealership in Bloomington, Minnesota.

His son Chris was a hockey player with the Sioux Falls Stampede of the United States Hockey League.
