= Mark Davidson =

American baseball player (born 1961)

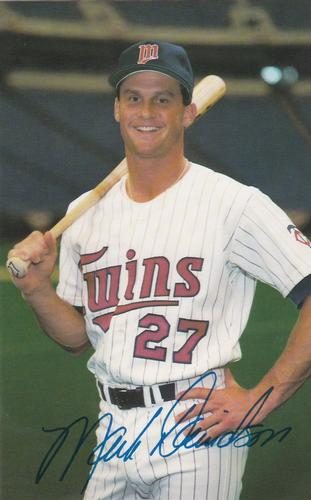
- Davidson in 1987
- Outfielder
- Born: February 15, 1961 (age 65); Knoxville, Tennessee, U.S.
- Batted: Right Threw: Right

MLB debut
- June 20, 1986, for the Minnesota Twins

Last MLB appearance
- September 20, 1991, for the Houston Astros

MLB statistics
- Batting average: .225
- Home runs: 6
- Runs batted in: 57
- Stats at Baseball Reference

Teams
- Minnesota Twins (1986–1988); Houston Astros (1989–1991)

Career highlights and awards
- World Series champion (1987)

John Mark Davidson (born February 15, 1961) is an American former professional baseball outfielder. He played in Major League Baseball (MLB) from 1986 to 1991 for the Minnesota Twins and Houston Astros.

== Career ==
Davidson graduated in 1978 from Garinger High School in Charlotte, North Carolina. He played baseball for UNC Charlotte in 1979 and 1980, and then transferred to Clemson University, where he played in 1982.

He was drafted by the Minnesota Twins in the 11th round of the 1982 Major League Baseball draft. In 1987, he played in 102 games and had a .267 batting average. Davidson was a member of the Twins team that won the 1987 World Series.

== Personal life ==
Davidson currently lives in Seneca, South Carolina.

Davidson's son, Logan, currently plays professional baseball in the Los Angeles Angels organization. His daughter, Taylor, played tennis for Stanford University.
