= Rob Nelson (baseball) =

American baseball player (born 1964)

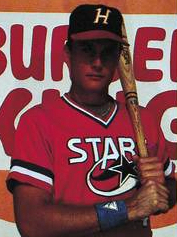
- Nelson with the Huntsville Stars c. 1985
- First baseman
- Born: May 17, 1964 (age 61); Pasadena, California, U.S.
- Batted: Left Threw: Left

MLB debut
- September 9, 1986, for the Oakland Athletics

Last MLB appearance
- April 29, 1990, for the San Diego Padres

MLB statistics
- Batting average: .178
- Home runs: 4
- Runs batted in: 11
- Stats at Baseball Reference

Teams
- Oakland Athletics (1986–1987); San Diego Padres (1987–1990)

Robert Augustus Nelson (born May 17, 1964) is an American former professional baseball first baseman. He played parts of six to seven Major League Baseball (MLB) seasons, from 1986 to 1990, for the Oakland Athletics and San Diego Padres.

Nelson attended South Pasadena High School and then Mt. San Antonio College, both in southern California. He was drafted twice, by the Houston Astros in the 27th round of the 1982 draft and the Atlanta Braves in the first round secondary phase of the January 1983 draft, before signing with Oakland after being drafted in the first round with the seventh pick of the secondary phase of the June 1983 draft.

After his final game in MLB, Nelson's career continued in the minors, playing in the Chicago White Sox, Minnesota Twins, Houston Astros and San Francisco Giants organizations through 1994, as well as a stint in the Mexican League. In 1995, he was a replacement player during the 1994–95 MLB strike and participated in spring training with the Cleveland Indians.

Nelson's number was retired by his high school in 2024. He and his wife Leenie have three children and four grandchildren.
