= Les Straker =

Venezuelan baseball player (born 1959)

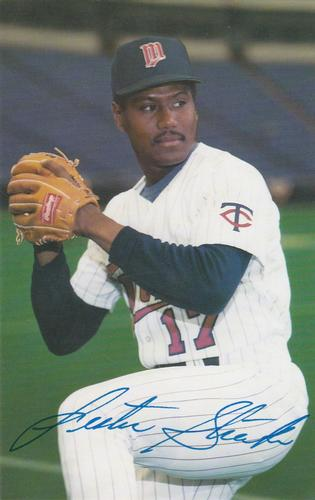
- Straker in 1987
- Pitcher
- Born: October 10, 1959 (age 66); Ciudad Bolívar, Bolívar State, Venezuela
- Batted: Right Threw: Right

MLB debut
- April 11, 1987, for the Minnesota Twins

Last MLB appearance
- October 1, 1988, for the Minnesota Twins

MLB statistics
- Win–loss record: 10–15
- Earned run average: 4.22
- Strikeouts: 99
- Stats at Baseball Reference

Teams
- Minnesota Twins (1987–1988)

Career highlights and awards
- World Series champion (1987)

Lester Paul Straker Bolnalda (born October 10, 1959) is a Venezuelan former professional baseball right-handed starting pitcher. He played two seasons for the Minnesota Twins in 1987–88. Straker is currently the pitching coach for the DSL Phillies.

== Career ==
=== Playing ===
A ten-year minor leaguer, Straker went all the way to the 1987 World Series in his rookie year. As a young prospect, Straker was released by the Cincinnati Reds and Oakland Athletics. He made his major league debut with the Twins as their number-three starter behind Frank Viola and Bert Blyleven.

Straker became the first Venezuelan to pitch in the World Series when he started games three and six. He began 1988 on the disabled list and never completely recovered his form, being released when the season was over. He played two additional seasons in the minor leagues.

In his two-season, 47-game career, Straker had a record of 10–15, with 99 strikeouts, one shutout, one save, and a 4.22 earned run average.

=== Coaching ===
Straker was named as the pitching coach for the DSL Phillies for the 2018 season.

== See also ==
- List of players from Venezuela in Major League Baseball
