= Don Gordon (baseball) =

American baseball player (born 1959)

- Pitcher
- Born: October 10, 1959 (age 66); New York, New York, U.S.
- Batted: Right Threw: Right

MLB debut
- April 10, 1986, for the Toronto Blue Jays

Last MLB appearance
- September 29, 1988, for the Cleveland Indians

MLB statistics
- Win–loss record: 3–8
- Earned run average: 4.72
- Strikeouts: 56
- Stats at Baseball Reference

Teams
- Toronto Blue Jays (1986–1987); Cleveland Indians (1987–1988)

Donald Thomas Gordon (born October 10, 1959) is an American former Major League Baseball pitcher who played for three seasons. He pitched for the Toronto Blue Jays from 1986 to 1987 and the Cleveland Indians from 1987 to 1988. He has the distinction of being traded for a hall of famer, Phil Niekro, on August 10, 1987. Neither player would appear in the majors after the following season.

Gordon attended The Citadel and the University of South Carolina. In 1981, he played collegiate summer baseball with the Hyannis Mets of the Cape Cod Baseball League. He was selected by the Detroit Tigers in the 31st round of the 1982 MLB draft.
