= 1988 Detroit Tigers season =

Major League Baseball season

1988 Detroit Tigers
- League: American League
- Division: East
- Ballpark: Tiger Stadium
- City: Detroit, Michigan
- Record: 88–74 (.543)
- Divisional place: 2nd
- Owners: Tom Monaghan
- General managers: Bill Lajoie
- Managers: Sparky Anderson
- Television: WDIV-TV (George Kell, Al Kaline); PASS (Larry Osterman, Jim Northrup)
- Radio: WJR (Ernie Harwell, Paul Carey)

The 1988 Detroit Tigers season was the team's 88th season and the 77th season at Tiger Stadium. The Tigers, fresh off of losing the American League pennant to the Minnesota Twins, were attempting to repeat as American League East champions after winning the division on the final day of the previous season.

The Tigers hit five grand slams, the most in MLB in 1988.

== Offseason ==
- October 23, 1987: Dickie Noles was returned by the Tigers to the Chicago Cubs as part of an earlier agreement (Noles was loaned to the Tigers on September 22).
- March 23, 1988: Mark Huismann was signed as a free agent by the Tigers.
- March 24, 1988: Balvino Gálvez was traded by the Tigers to the Minnesota Twins for Billy Beane.

== Regular season ==
=== Season standings ===
AL East
Team	W	L	Pct.	GB	Home	Road
Boston Red Sox	89	73	.549	—	53‍–‍28	36‍–‍45
Detroit Tigers	88	74	.543	1	50‍–‍31	38‍–‍43
Milwaukee Brewers	87	75	.537	2	47‍–‍34	40‍–‍41
Toronto Blue Jays	87	75	.537	2	45‍–‍36	42‍–‍39
New York Yankees	85	76	.528	3½	46‍–‍34	39‍–‍42
Cleveland Indians	78	84	.481	11	44‍–‍37	34‍–‍47
Baltimore Orioles	54	107	.335	34½	34‍–‍46	20‍–‍61

=== Record vs. opponents ===
1988 American League record Sources:
Team	BAL	BOS	CAL	CWS	CLE	DET	KC	MIL	MIN	NYY	OAK	SEA	TEX	TOR
Baltimore	—	4–9	5–7	4–7	4–9	5–8	0–12	4–9	3–9	3–10	4–8	7–5	6–6	5–8
Boston	9–4	—	8–4	7–5	8–5	6–7	6–6	10–3	7–5	9–4	3–9	6–6	8–4	2–11
California	7–5	4–8	—	9–4	8–4	5–7	5–8	3–9	4–9	6–6	4–9	6–7	8–5	6–6
Chicago	7–4	5–7	4–9	—	3–9	3–9	7–6	6–6	4–9	3–9	5–8	9–4	8–5	7–5
Cleveland	9–4	5–8	4–8	9–3	—	4–9	6–6	9–4	5–7	6–7	4–8	5–7	6–6	6–7
Detroit	8–5	7–6	7–5	9–3	9–4	—	8–4	5–8	1–11	8–5	4–8	9–3	8–4	5–8
Kansas City	12–0	6–6	8–5	6–7	6–6	4–8	—	3–9	7–6	6–6	8–5	7–5	7–6	4–8
Milwaukee	9–4	3–10	9–3	6–6	4–9	8–5	9–3	—	7–5	6–7	3–9	8–4	8–4	7–6
Minnesota	9–3	5–7	9–4	9–4	7–5	11–1	6–7	5–7	—	3–9	5–8	8–5	7–6	7–5
New York	10–3	4–9	6–6	9–3	7–6	5–8	6–6	7–6	9–3	—	6–6	5–7	5–6	6–7
Oakland	8–4	9–3	9–4	8–5	8–4	8–4	5–8	9–3	8–5	6–6	—	9–4	8–5	9–3
Seattle	5–7	6–6	7–6	4–9	7–5	3–9	5–7	4–8	5–8	7–5	4–9	—	6–7	5–7
Texas	6–6	4–8	5–8	5–8	6–6	4–8	6–7	4–8	6–7	6–5	5–8	7–6	—	6–6
Toronto	8–5	11–2	6–6	5–7	7–6	8–5	8–4	6–7	5–7	7–6	3–9	7–5	6–6	—

=== Notable transactions ===
- August 31, 1988: Rey Palacios and Mark Lee were traded by the Tigers to the Kansas City Royals for Ted Power
- August 31, 1988: The Tigers sent Chris Hoiles and players to be named later to the Baltimore Orioles for Fred Lynn

==== Draft picks ====
- June 1, 1988: 1988 Major League Baseball draft
  - Rico Brogna was drafted by the Tigers in the 1st round (26th pick). Player signed June 18, 1988.
  - Dave Haas was drafted by the Tigers in the 15th round.

=== Roster ===
1988 Detroit Tigers
Roster
Pitchers: 19 Doyle Alexander; 48 Paul Gibson; 17 Don Heinkel; 39 Mike Henneman; 21 Willie Hernández; 27 Mark Huismann; 25 Eric King; 47 Jack Morris; 43 Ted Power; 44 Jeff Robinson; 49 Steve Searcy; 26 Frank Tanana; 35 Walt Terrell; 36 Mike Trujillo	Catchers: 10 Chris Bando; 8 Mike Heath; 33 Matt Nokes; Infielders: 14 Dave Bergman; 16 Tom Brookens; 30 Iván DeJesús; 41 Darrell Evans; 22 Ray Knight; 23 Torey Lovullo; 9 Jim Morrison; 3 Alan Trammell; 32 Jim Walewander; 1 Lou Whitaker	Outfielders: 4 Billy Bean; 29 Billy Beane; 31 Larry Herndon; 34 Chet Lemon; 7 Scott Lusader; 9 Fred Lynn; 40 Dwayne Murphy; 24 Gary Pettis; 12 Luis Salazar; 15 Pat Sheridan	Manager: 11 Sparky Anderson; Coaches: 50 Billy Consolo; 51 Alex Grammas; 56 Billy Muffett; 28 Vada Pinson; 53 Dick Tracewski

== Player stats ==
= Indicates team leader

=== Batting ===
==== Starters by position ====
Note: Pos = Position; G = Games played; AB = At bats; H = Hits; Avg. = Batting average; HR = Home runs; RBI = Runs batted in

Pos	Player	G	AB	H	Avg.	HR	RBI
C	Matt Nokes	122	382	96	.251	16	53
1B	Ray Knight	105	299	65	.217	3	33
2B	Lou Whitaker	115	403	111	.275	12	55
3B	Tom Brookens	136	441	107	.243	5	38
SS	Alan Trammell	128	466	145	.311	15	69
LF	Pat Sheridan	127	347	88	.254	11	47
CF	Gary Pettis	129	458	96	.210	3	36
RF	Chet Lemon	144	512	135	.264	17	64
DH	Darrell Evans	144	437	91	.208	22	64

==== Other batters ====
Note: G = Games played; AB = At bats; H = Hits; Avg. = Batting average; HR = Home runs; RBI = Runs batted in

Player	G	AB	H	Avg.	HR	RBI
Luis Salazar	130	452	122	.270	12	62
Dave Bergman	116	289	85	.294	5	35
Mike Heath	86	219	54	.247	5	18
Jim Walewander	88	175	37	.211	0	6
Larry Herndon	76	174	39	.224	4	20
Dwayne Murphy	49	144	36	.250	4	19
Fred Lynn	27	90	20	.222	7	19
Jim Morrison	24	74	16	.216	0	6
Torey Lovullo	12	21	8	.381	1	2
Iván DeJesús	7	17	3	.176	0	0
Scott Lusader	16	16	1	.063	1	3
Billy Bean	10	11	2	.182	0	0
Billy Beane	6	6	1	.167	0	1
Chris Bando	1	0	0	----	0	0

=== Pitching ===
==== Starting pitchers ====
Note: G = Games pitched; IP = Innings pitched; W = Wins; L = Losses; ERA = Earned run average; SO = Strikeouts

Player	G	IP	W	L	ERA	SO
Jack Morris	34	235.0	15	13	3.94	168
Doyle Alexander	34	229.0	14	11	4.32	126
Walt Terrell	29	206.1	7	16	3.97	84
Frank Tanana	32	203.0	14	11	4.21	127
Jeff Robinson	24	172.0	13	6	2.98	114
Steve Searcy	2	8.0	0	2	5.63	5

==== Other pitchers ====
Note: G = Games pitched; IP = Innings pitched; W = Wins; L = Losses; ERA = Earned run average; SO = Strikeouts

Player	G	IP	W	L	ERA	SO
Eric King	23	68.2	4	1	3.41	45
Ted Power	4	18.2	1	1	5.79	13

==== Relief pitchers ====
Note: G = Games pitched; W = Wins; L = Losses; SV = Saves; ERA = Earned run average; SO = Strikeouts

Player	G	W	L	SV	ERA	SO
Mike Henneman	65	9	6	22	1.87	58
Willie Hernández	63	6	5	10	3.06	59
Paul Gibson	40	4	2	0	2.93	50
Don Heinkel	21	0	0	1	3.96	30
Mike Trujillo	6	0	0	0	5.11	5
Mark Huismann	5	1	0	0	5.06	6

== Farm system ==
Level	Team	League	Manager
AAA	Toledo Mud Hens	International League	Pat Corrales
AA	Glens Falls Tigers	Eastern League	John Wockenfuss
A	Lakeland Tigers	Florida State League	Johnny Lipon
A	Fayetteville Generals	South Atlantic League	Leon Roberts
Rookie	Bristol Tigers	Appalachian League	Rick Magnante
