= 1987 Detroit Tigers season =

Major League Baseball season

1987 Detroit Tigers
- American League East champions
- League: American League
- Division: East
- Ballpark: Tiger Stadium
- City: Detroit, Michigan
- Record: 98–64 (.605)
- Divisional place: 1st
- Owners: Tom Monaghan
- General managers: Bill Lajoie
- Managers: Sparky Anderson
- Television: WDIV-TV (George Kell, Al Kaline); PASS (Larry Osterman, Jim Northrup)
- Radio: WJR (Ernie Harwell, Paul Carey)

The 1987 Detroit Tigers season was the team's 87th season and the 76th season at Tiger Stadium. The Tigers made a late-season comeback to win the American League East on the season's final day. The Tigers finished with a Major League-best record of 98–64, two games ahead of the Toronto Blue Jays. Detroit lost the ALCS to the Minnesota Twins in 5 games.

This would be the last time the Tigers made the postseason until 2006.

== Offseason ==
- March 23, 1987: Brian Harper was released by the Tigers.

== Regular season ==
After their 1984 championship season, the Tigers finished in third place in the AL East in both 1985 and 1986. The 1987 Tigers faced lowered expectations – which seemed to be confirmed by an 11–19 start to the season. The team hit its stride thereafter and gradually gained ground on its AL East rivals. This charge was fueled in part by the acquisition of pitcher Doyle Alexander from the Atlanta Braves in exchange for minor league pitcher John Smoltz. Alexander started 11 games for the Tigers, posting 9 wins without a loss and a 1.53 ERA. The deal came at a price. Smoltz, a Lansing, Michigan native, went on to have a long, productive career with the Braves winning a Cy Young Award and eventually gaining entry into the Baseball Hall of Fame in 2015.

Despite their improvement, they entered September neck-and-neck with the Toronto Blue Jays. The two teams would square off in seven hard-fought games during the final two weeks of the season. All seven games were decided by one run, and in the first six of the seven games, the winning run was scored in the final inning of play. At Exhibition Stadium, the Tigers dropped three in a row to the Blue Jays before winning a dramatic extra-inning showdown.

The Tigers entered the final week of the 1987 season 3.5 games behind. After a series against the Baltimore Orioles, the Tigers returned home trailing by a game and swept the Blue Jays. Detroit clinched the division in a 1–0 victory over Toronto in front of 51,005 fans at Tiger Stadium on Sunday afternoon, October 4. Frank Tanana pitched a complete-game shutout, and outfielder Larry Herndon hit a second-inning solo home run for the game's only run. Detroit finished the season with a Major League-best 98–64, two games ahead of Toronto. The team hit 225 home runs, the most since the 1961 New York Yankees.

In what would be their last postseason appearance until 2006, the Tigers lost the 1987 American League Championship Series to the underdog Minnesota Twins (who would go on to win the World Series) in five games.

The 1987 Tigers' winning percentage ranks as the 10th best in team history, as follows:

**Best Seasons in Detroit Tigers History**
**Rank**	**Year**	**Wins**	**Losses**	**Win %**	**Finish**
1	1934	101	53	.656	Lost 1934 World Series to Cardinals
2	1915	100	54	.649	2nd in AL behind Red Sox
3	1909	98	54	.645	Lost 1909 World Series to Pirates
4	1984	104	58	.642	Won 1984 World Series over Padres
5	1968	103	59	.636	Won 1968 World Series over Cardinals
6	1961	101	61	.623	2nd in AL behind Yankees
7	1950	95	59	.617	2nd in AL behind Yankees
8	1935	93	58	.616	Won 1935 World Series over Cubs
9	1907	92	58	.613	Lost 1907 World Series to Cubs
10	1987	98	64	.605	Lost 1987 ALCS to Twins

=== Season standings ===
AL East
Team	W	L	Pct.	GB	Home	Road
Detroit Tigers	98	64	.605	—	54‍–‍27	44‍–‍37
Toronto Blue Jays	96	66	.593	2	52‍–‍29	44‍–‍37
Milwaukee Brewers	91	71	.562	7	48‍–‍33	43‍–‍38
New York Yankees	89	73	.549	9	51‍–‍30	38‍–‍43
Boston Red Sox	78	84	.481	20	50‍–‍30	28‍–‍54
Baltimore Orioles	67	95	.414	31	31‍–‍51	36‍–‍44
Cleveland Indians	61	101	.377	37	35‍–‍46	26‍–‍55

=== Record vs. opponents ===
1987 American League record Sources:
Team	BAL	BOS	CAL	CWS	CLE	DET	KC	MIL	MIN	NYY	OAK	SEA	TEX	TOR
Baltimore	—	1–12	9–3	8–4	7–6	4–9	9–3	2–11	5–7	3–10	7–5	4–8	7–5	1–12
Boston	12–1	—	4–8	3–9	7–6	2–11	6–6	6–7	7–5	7–6	4–8	7–5	7–5	6–7
California	3–9	8–4	—	8–5	7–5	3–9	5–8	7–5	8–5	3–9	6–7	7–6	5–8	5–7
Chicago	4–8	9–3	5–8	—	7–5	3–9	6–7	6–6	6–7	5–7	9–4	6–7	7–6	4–8
Cleveland	6–7	6–7	5–7	5–7	—	4–9	6–6	4–9	3–9	6–7	4–8	5–7	2–10	5–8
Detroit	9–4	11–2	9–3	9–3	9–4	—	5–7	6–7	8–4	5–8	5–7	7–5	8–4	7–6
Kansas City	3–9	6–6	8–5	7–6	6–6	7–5	—	4–8	8–5	5–7	5–8	9–4	7–6	8–4
Milwaukee	11–2	7–6	5–7	6–6	9–4	7–6	8–4	—	3–9	7–6	6–6	4–8	9–3	9–4
Minnesota	7–5	5–7	5–8	7–6	9–3	4–8	5–8	9–3	—	6–6	10–3	9–4	6–7	3–9
New York	10–3	6–7	9–3	7–5	7–6	8–5	7–5	6–7	6–6	—	5–7	7–5	5–7	6–7
Oakland	5–7	8–4	7–6	4–9	8–4	7–5	8–5	6–6	3–10	7–5	—	5–8	6–7	7–5
Seattle	8–4	5–7	6–7	7–6	7–5	5–7	4–9	8–4	4–9	5–7	8–5	—	9–4	2–10
Texas	5–7	5–7	8–5	6–7	10–2	4–8	6–7	3–9	7–6	7–5	7–6	4–9	—	3–9
Toronto	12–1	7–6	7–5	8–4	8–5	6–7	4–8	4–9	9–3	7–6	5–7	10–2	9–3	—

=== Transactions ===
- June 2, 1987: 1987 Major League Baseball draft
  - Travis Fryman was drafted by the Tigers in the 1st round (30th pick). Player signed June 6, 1987.
  - Torey Lovullo was drafted by the Tigers in the 5th round. Player signed June 7, 1987.
- June 4, 1987: Bill Madlock was signed as a free agent by the Tigers.
- August 7, 1987: Darnell Coles and a player to be named later were traded by the Tigers to the Pittsburgh Pirates for Jim Morrison. The Tigers completed the deal by sending Morris Madden to the Pirates on August 12.
- August 12, 1987: John Smoltz was traded by the Tigers to the Atlanta Braves for Doyle Alexander.
- September 22, 1987: Dickie Noles was loaned to the Tigers by the Chicago Cubs.

=== Roster ===
1987 Detroit Tigers
**Roster**
**Pitchers**: 19 Doyle Alexander; 39 Mike Henneman; 21 Willie Hernández; 45 Bryan Kelly; 25 Eric King; 42 Morris Madden; 47 Jack Morris; 27 Dickie Noles; 46 Dan Petry; 44 Jeff Robinson; 36 Nate Snell; 26 Frank Tanana; 35 Walt Terrell; 30 Mark Thurmond	**Catchers**: 8 Mike Heath; 12 Dwight Lowry; 24 Orlando Mercado; 33 Matt Nokes; **Infielders**: 9 Doug Baker; 14 Dave Bergman; 16 Tom Brookens; 19 Darnell Coles; 41 Darrell Evans; 7 Bill Madlock; 17 Jim Morrison; 3 Alan Trammell; 32 Jim Walewander; 1 Lou Whitaker	**Outfielders**: 4 Billy Bean; 23 Kirk Gibson; 30 Johnny Grubb; 17 Terry Harper; 31 Larry Herndon; 34 Chet Lemon; 24 Scott Lusader; 15 Pat Sheridan; 38 Tim Tolman	**Manager**: 11 Sparky Anderson; **Coaches**: 50 Billy Consolo (Bench); 51 Alex Grammas (Third base); 56 Billy Muffett (Pitching); 28 Vada Pinson (Hitting); 53 Dick Tracewski (First base)

=== Game log ===
Past games legend
Tigers Win (#bfb)	Tigers Loss (#fbb)	Game postponed (#bbb)	All-Star Game (#bbcaff)	Clinched Division (#039)
Bold denotes a Tigers pitcher

1987 game log: 98–64 (Home: 54–27; Away: 44–37)
April: 9–12 (Home: 4–5; Away: 5–7)

#	Date	Opponent	Score	Win	Loss	Save	Crowd	Record	Streak
1	April 6	Yankees	1–2 (10)	Righetti (1–0)	**Morris** (0–1)		51,315	0–1	L1
2	April 8	Yankees	5–6	Hudson (1–0)	**Hernández** (0–1)	Righetti (1)	12,271	0–2	L2
3	April 9	Yankees	9–3	**Terrell** (1–0)	Tewksbury (1–0)		12,228	1–2	W1
4	April 10	@ White Sox	11–4	**Tanana** (1–0)	Allen (0–1)		40,025	2–2	W2
5	April 11	@ White Sox	7–1	**Morris** (1–1)	Dotson (1–1)		12,896	3–2	W3
6	April 12	@ White Sox	7–1	**Robinson** (1–0)	Davis (0–1)		13,245	4–2	W4
7	April 14	@ Royals	1–10	Gubicza (1–1)	**Petry** (0–1)		16,023	4–3	L1
8	April 15	@ Royals	1–2	Saberhagen (2–0)	**Terrell** (1–1)	Black (1)	18,721	4–4	L2
9	April 17	White Sox	3–1	**Tanana** (2–0)	Dotson (1–2)	**Thurmond** (1)	16,953	5–4	W1
10	April 18	White Sox	3–2	**King** (1–0)	Thigpen (0–1)		20,607	6–4	W2
11	April 19	White Sox	2–7	Bannister (1–1)	**Petry** (0–2)		14,269	6–5	L1
12	April 20	@ Yankees	2–8	Rhoden (2–1)	**Morris** (1–2)	Righetti (4)	20,111	6–6	L2
13	April 21	@ Yankees	1–3	Niekro (1–1)	**Terrell** (1–2)	Guante (1)	25,148	6–7	L3
14	April 22	@ Yankees	1–4	Shirley (1–0)	**Tanana** (2–1)	Righetti (5)	21,091	6–8	L4
15	April 24	Royals	3–7	Leibrandt (3–1)	**Petry** (0–3)		14,449	6–9	L5
16	April 25	Royals	13–2	**Morris** (2–2)	Gubicza (1–3)		18,052	7–9	W1
17	April 26	Royals	1–6	Saberhagen (4–0)	**Terrell** (1–3)		16,686	7–10	L1
18	April 27	@ Mariners	2–5	Langston (3–2)	**King** (1–1)	Núñez (4)	8,492	7–11	L2
19	April 28	@ Mariners	4–6	Morgan (1–3)	**Robinson** (1–1)	Núñez (5)	7,393	7–12	L3
20	April 29	@ Angels	2–1 (10)	**King** (2–1)	Moore (1–1)		26,126	8–12	W1
21	April 30	@ Angels	12–4	**Morris** (3–2)	Fraser (1–1)		27,656	9–12	W2

May: 15–11 (Home: 11–6; Away: 4–5)

#	Date	Opponent	Score	Win	Loss	Save	Crowd	Record	Streak
22	May 1	@ Athletics	1–2 (13)	Eckersley (2–1)	**Kelly** (0–1)		14,035	9–13	L1
23	May 2	@ Athletics	2–3 (13)	Leiper (1–0)	**Snell** (0–1)		17,753	9–14	L2
24	May 3	@ Athletics	0–2	Plunk (1–1)	**King** (2–2)	Howell (4)	21,810	9–15	L3
25	May 5	Mariners	5–7	Clarke (1–0)	**Robinson** (1–2)	Núñez (6)	10,918	9–16	L4
26	May 6	Mariners	7–5	**Terrell** (2–3)	Bankhead (4–2)	**Thurmond** (2)	13,718	10–16	W1
27	May 8	Athletics	2–7	Young (4–1)	**Tanana** (2–2)		13,949	10–17	L1
28	May 9	Athletics	7–8	G. Nelson (1–1)	**Thurmond** (0–1)	Howell (5)	15,685	10–18	L2
29	May 10	Athletics	7–6	**Snell** (1–1)	Ontiveros (0–1)		14,114	11–18	W1
30	May 11	Angels	1–5	Witt (5–2)	**Terrell** (2–4)	Buice (2)	11,079	11–19	L1
31	May 12	Angels	15–2	**Petry** (1–3)	Lugo (0–2)		11,579	12–19	W1
32	May 13	Angels	10–7	**Tanana** (3–2)	Candelaria (4–1)		11,659	13–19	W2
33	May 15	Indians	4–3	**Henneman** (1–0)	Huismann (0–1)		17,525	14–19	W3
34	May 16	Indians	5–3	**Morris** (4–2)	Niekro (2–3)		20,583	15–19	W4
35	May 17	Indians	8–4	**Terrell** (3–4)	Carlton (2–4)		20,824	16–19	W5
36	May 18	@ Rangers	6–3	**Robinson** (2–2)	Guzmán (2–3)	**Thurmond** (3)	26,503	17–19	W6
37	May 19	@ Rangers	8–10	Mohorcic (3–1)	**King** (2–3)		17,484	17–20	L1
38	May 20	@ Rangers	6–4	**Petry** (2–3)	Witt (1–3)	**King** (1)	16,820	18–20	W1
39	May 22	@ Twins	3–2	**Morris** (5–2)	Viola (2–5)	**King** (2)	15,423	19–20	W2
40	May 23	@ Twins	5–7	Anderson (1–0)	**Terrell** (3–5)	Reardon (9)	18,601	19–21	L1
41	May 24	@ Twins	7–2	**Robinson** (3–2)	Atherton (2–1)		16,351	20–21	W1
42	May 25	Rangers	8–5	**Tanana** (4–2)	Correa (1–5)	**Henneman** (1)	13,824	21–21	W2
43	May 26	Rangers	8–7 (11)	**Henneman** (2–0)	Mohorcic (3–2)		11,234	22–21	W3
44	May 27	Rangers	4–3	**Morris** (6–2)	Loynd (1–2)	**Thurmond** (4)	12,696	23–21	W4
45	May 29	Twins	15–7	**Terrell** (4–5)	Straker (2–2)		19,031	24–21	W5
—	May 30	Twins	Postponed (Rain); Makeup: May 31						
46	May 31	Twins	5–9	Reardon (2–3)	**King** (2–4)		–	24–22	L1
47	May 31	Twins	3–11	Frazier (5–2)	**Tanana** (4–3)		20,993	24–23	L2

June: 17–9 (Home: 7–5; Away: 10–4)

#	Date	Opponent	Score	Win	Loss	Save	Crowd	Record	Streak
48	June 1	@ Indians	6–9	Niekro (3–5)	**Petry** (2–4)	Bailes (3)	6,509	24–24	L3
—	June 2	@ Indians	Postponed (Rain); Makeup: August 21						
49	June 3	@ Indians	15–3	**Morris** (7–2)	Schrom (4–5)		8,226	25–24	W1
50	June 4	@ Red Sox	5–8	Hurst (6–4)	**Terrell** (4–6)		24,660	25–25	L1
51	June 5	@ Red Sox	4–2	**Robinson** (4–2)	Nipper (4–5)	**King** (3)	33,827	26–25	W1
52	June 6	@ Red Sox	5–3 (14)	**King** (3–4)	Gardner (0–3)		33,902	27–25	W2
53	June 7	@ Red Sox	18–8	**Henneman** (3–0)	Leister (0–1)		33,254	28–25	W3
54	June 9	Brewers	8–5	**Morris** (8–2)	Higuera (5–6)		16,645	29–25	W4
55	June 10	Brewers	5–8 (10)	Plesac (2–0)	**King** (3–5)		16,998	29–26	L1
56	June 11	Brewers	5–8	Wegman (5–5)	**King** (3–6)	Bosio (2)	20,780	29–27	L2
57	June 12	Red Sox	11–4	**Tanana** (5–3)	Clemens (4–6)		32,341	30–27	W1
58	June 13	Red Sox	6–4	**Petry** (3–4)	Crawford (2–2)	**Hernández** (1)	40,427	31–27	W2
59	June 14	Red Sox	2–1	**Morris** (6–2)	Hurst (7–5)		28,203	32–27	W3
60	June 15	@ Blue Jays	2–1	**Terrell** (5–6)	Key (8–4)	**King** (4)	36,225	33–27	W4
61	June 16	@ Blue Jays	4–10	Lavelle (1–0)	**Robinson** (4–3)		36,398	33–28	L1
62	June 17	@ Blue Jays	3–2	**Tanana** (6–3)	Clancy (7–4)	**Hernández** (2)	46,227	34–28	W1
63	June 19	@ Orioles	5–3	**Morris** (10–2)	Williamson (2–5)	**Hernández** (3)	31,672	35–28	W2
64	June 20	@ Orioles	5–9	Bell (6–5)	**Terrell** (5–7)	Niedenfuer (2)	27,240	35–29	L1
65	June 21	@ Orioles	9–3	**Petry** (4–4)	Dixon (3–7)	**King** (5)	28,845	36–29	W1
66	June 22	Blue Jays	2–0	**Tanana** (7–3)	Clancy (7–5)		28,978	37–29	W2
67	June 23	Blue Jays	7–8	Stieb (6–4)	**Robinson** (4–4)	Henke (13)	29,275	37–30	L1
68	June 24	Blue Jays	3–5	Cerutti (5–2)	**Morris** (10–3)	Musselman (3)	34,866	37–31	L2
69	June 26	Orioles	9–0	**Terrell** (6–7)	Griffin (0–1)		29,396	38–31	W1
70	June 27	Orioles	2–4	Niedenfuer (1–0)	**Tanana** (7–4)		32,395	38–32	L1
71	June 28	Orioles	8–7 (11)	**Hernández** (1–1)	Corbett (0–2)		31,606	39–32	W1
72	June 29	@ Brewers	11–1	**Morris** (11–3)	Bosio (3–2)		21,487	40–32	W2
73	June 30	@ Brewers	8–5	**Petry** (5–4)	Clear (5–3)	**Hernández** (4)	21,609	41–32	W3

July: 17–9 (Home: 10–3; Away: 7–6)

#	Date	Opponent	Score	Win	Loss	Save	Crowd	Record	Streak
74	July 1	@ Brewers	2–13	Wegman (7–7)	**Terrell** (6–8)		24,528	41–33	L1
75	July 2	@ Mariners	2–5	Guetterman (6–1)	**Tanana** (7–5)		10,646	41–34	L2
76	July 3	@ Mariners	5–2	**Robinson** (5–4)	Moore (3–10)	**King** (6)	13,568	42–34	W1
77	July 4	@ Mariners	7–3	**Morris** (12–3)	Campbell (0–1)		16,884	43–34	W2
78	July 5	@ Mariners	7–5	**Petry** (6–4)	Langston (10–7)	**Henneman** (2)	13,232	44–34	W3
79	July 6	@ Athletics	3–5	G. Nelson (4–1)	**King** (3–7)	Howell (15)	14,656	44–35	L1
80	July 7	@ Athletics	6–4	**Tanana** (8–5)	Andújar (3–2)	**Hernández** (5)	17,174	45–35	W1
81	July 8	@ Athletics	9–5	**Robinson** (6–4)	Ontiveros (5–3)	**Thurmond** (5)	20,031	46–35	W2
82	July 9	@ Angels	2–5	Sutton (6–9)	**Morris** (12–4)	Minton (5)	30,966	46–36	L1
83	July 10	@ Angels	9–4	**King** (4–7)	Lazorko (2–5)		31,073	47–36	W1
84	July 11	@ Angels	12–5	**Henneman** (4–0)	Reuss (3–1)		44,219	48–36	W2
85	July 12	@ Angels	4–5	Witt (11–5)	**Tanana** (8–6)	Minton (6)	42,682	48–37	L1
ASG	July 14	NL @ AL	2–0	Smith (1–0)	Howell (0–1)	Fernandez (1)	49,671	—	N/A
86	July 16	Mariners	3–2	**Terrell** (7–8)	Moore (3–11)		20,488	49–37	W1
87	July 17	Mariners	7–0	**Tanana** (9–6)	Langston (10–9)		24,669	50–37	W2
88	July 18	Mariners	10–6	**Henneman** (5–0)	Reed (0–1)	**King** (7)	31,594	51–37	W3
89	July 19	Mariners	4–5	Núñez (3–1)	**Hernández** (1–2)		23,577	51–38	L1
90	July 20	Athletics	5–4	**Henneman** (6–0)	G. Nelson (4–2)		22,692	52–38	W1
91	July 21	Athletics	6–5 (10)	**King** (5–7)	Howell (3–4)		23,118	53–38	W2
92	July 22	Athletics	1–10	Lamp (1–0)	**Tanana** (9–7)		24,855	53–39	L1
93	July 24	Angels	6–3	**Henneman** (7–0)	Finley (2–4)		33,275	54–39	W1
94	July 25	Angels	5–4 (10)	**Henneman** (8–0)	Minton (3–1)		34,973	55–39	W2
95	July 26	Angels	6–2	**Terrell** (8–8)	Fraser (6–7)		31,339	56–39	W3
96	July 27	White Sox	4–1	**Tanana** (10–7)	Nielsen (3–4)		23,704	57–39	W4
97	July 28	White Sox	3–1	**Robinson** (7–4)	Long (5–6)		26,156	58–39	W5
98	July 29	White Sox	0–4	Bannister (6–8)	**Morris** (12–5)		28,918	58–40	L1
99	July 31	@ Yankees	5–6	Righetti (6–3)	**Henneman** (8–1)		50,214	58–41	L2

August: 19–11 (Home: 9–5; Away: 10–6)

#	Date	Opponent	Score	Win	Loss	Save	Crowd	Record	Streak
100	August 1	@ Yankees	10–5	**Tanana** (11–7)	Rasmussen (8–5)		55,103	59–41	W1
101	August 2	@ Yankees	5–8	Rhoden (14–6)	**Robinson** (7–5)	Righetti (20)	46,212	59–42	L1
102	August 3	Royals	2–4 (10)	Gleaton (2–3)	**Morris** (12–6)		25,781	59–43	L2
103	August 4	Royals	4–8	D. Jackson (5–13)	**Petry** (6–5)		23,330	59–44	L3
104	August 5	Royals	4–2	**Terrell** (9–8)	Saberhagen (15–7)		21,584	60–44	W1
105	August 6	Yankees	12–5	**Tanana** (12–7)	Guidry (3–5)		41,875	61–44	W2
106	August 7	Yankees	8–0	**Robinson** (8–5)	Rhoden (14–7)		48,262	62–44	W3
107	August 8	Yankees	0–7	John (11–4)	**King** (5–8)		45,812	62–45	L1
108	August 9	Yankees	15–4	**Petry** (7–5)	Rasmussen (8–6)		44,673	63–45	W1
109	August 10	@ White Sox	4–8	Dotson (9–8)	**Terrell** (9–9)		16,068	63–46	L1
110	August 11	@ White Sox	9–6	**Tanana** (13–7)	Nielsen (3–5)	**Hernández** (6)	14,567	64–46	W1
111	August 12	@ White Sox	8–7	**Hernández** (2–2)	Thigpen (3–4)		16,438	65–46	W2
112	August 13	@ Royals	4–1	**Morris** (13–6)	Gubicza (9–12)		38,221	66–46	W3
113	August 14	@ Royals	5–7	Black (5–6)	**Terrell** (9–10)	Quisenberry (8)	38,749	66–47	L1
114	August 15	@ Royals	8–4	**King** (6–8)	D. Jackson (6–14)	**Henneman** (3)	40,425	67–47	W1
115	August 16	@ Royals	10–6	**Robinson** (9–5)	Gleaton (2–4)		33,006	68–47	W2
116	August 18	Twins	11–2	**Morris** (14–6)	Carlton (6–12)		32,053	69–47	W3
117	August 19	Twins	7–1	**Terrell** (10–10)	Blyleven (12–10)		38,163	70–47	W4
118	August 20	Twins	8–0	**Alexander** (1–0)	Niekro (6–9)		45,804	71–47	W5
119	August 21	@ Indians	4–12	Easterly (1–0)	**Petry** (7–6)	Gordon (1)	–	71–48	L1
120	August 21	@ Indians	3–8	Farrell (2–0)	**Tanana** (13–8)		20,965	71–49	L2
121	August 22	@ Indians	8–6	**Henneman** (9–1)	Bailes (6–6)	**King** (8)	20,148	72–49	W1
122	August 23	@ Indians	4–3	**Morris** (15–6)	Candiotti (6–13)		21,097	73–49	W2
123	August 24	@ Twins	4–5	Reardon (6–6)	**King** (6–9)		27,338	73–50	L1
124	August 25	@ Twins	5–4	**Alexander** (2–0)	Niekro (6–10)	**Henneman** (4)	30,639	74–50	W1
125	August 26	@ Twins	10–8	**Petry** (8–6)	Reardon (6–7)	**Hernández** (7)	29,265	75–50	W2
126	August 28	Rangers	3–5	Williams (7–3)	**Morris** (15–7)	Mohorcic (16)	32,362	75–51	L1
127	August 29	Rangers	4–1	**Terrell** (11–10)	Witt (7–7)		41,604	76–51	W1
128	August 30	Rangers	7–0	**Alexander** (3–0)	Hough (14–10)		38,641	77–51	W2
129	August 31	Indians	2–7	Farrell (3–0)	**Tanana** (13–9)		22,530	77–52	L1

September: 17–12 (Home: 9–3; Away: 8–9)

#	Date	Opponent	Score	Win	Loss	Save	Crowd	Record	Streak
130	September 1	Indians	6–5 (12)	**Hernández** (3–2)	Gordon (0–2)		19,810	78–52	W1
131	September 2	Indians	2–1	**Morris** (16–7)	Candiotti (7–14)		20,516	79–52	W2
132	September 3	Indians	3–1	**Terrell** (12–10)	Yett (3–6)		21,964	80–52	W3
133	September 4	@ Rangers	11–2	**Alexander** (4–0)	Hough (14–11)		16,095	81–52	W4
134	September 5	@ Rangers	7–8	Howe (2–2)	**Hernández** (3–3)		26,058	81–53	L1
135	September 6	@ Rangers	3–9	Guzmán (12–11)	**Robinson** (9–6)		22,374	81–54	L2
136	September 7	@ Orioles	12–4	**Morris** (17–7)	Ballard (2–5)		13,651	82–54	W1
—	September 8	@ Orioles	Postponed (Rain); Makeup: September 9						
137	September 9	@ Orioles	7–4	**Terrell** (13–10)	Dixon (7–9)	**Hernández** (8)	–	83–54	W2
138	September 9	@ Orioles	6–0	**Alexander** (5–0)	Boddicker (10–8)		21,579	84–54	W3
139	September 10	@ Brewers	3–4	Nieves (12–6)	**Tanana** (13–10)	Mirabella (1)	9,715	84–55	L1
140	September 11	@ Brewers	2–5	Higuera (16–9)	**Henneman** (9–2)		21,161	84–56	L2
141	September 12	@ Brewers	2–11	Wegman (10–10)	**Morris** (17–8)		50,288	84–57	L3
142	September 13	@ Brewers	5–1	**Terrell** (14–10)	Bosio (10–6)		21,880	85–57	W1
143	September 14	Red Sox	3–0	**Alexander** (6–0)	Clemens (16–9)	**Henneman** (5)	23,287	86–57	W2
144	September 15	Red Sox	9–8	**Petry** (9–6)	Crawford (5–4)	**Henneman** (6)	20,398	87–57	W3
145	September 16	Red Sox	4–1	**Morris** (18–8)	Sellers (7–8)		22,341	88–57	W4
146	September 18	Brewers	5–2	**Terrell** (15–10)	Wegman (10–11)	**King** (9)	30,104	89–57	W5
147	September 19	Brewers	7–6	**Alexander** (7–0)	Bosio (10–7)		34,006	90–57	W6
148	September 20	Brewers	4–11	Nieves (13–7)	**Morris** (18–9)	Crim (10)	32,143	90–58	L1
149	September 21	@ Red Sox	4–9	Nipper (10–11)	**Snell** (1–2)		20,376	90–59	L2
150	September 22	@ Red Sox	8–5	**Terrell** (16–10)	Woodward (1–1)	**Noles** (1)	20,189	91–59	W1
151	September 23	@ Red Sox	4–0	**Alexander** (8–0)	Hurst (15–12)		23,798	92–59	W2
152	September 24	@ Blue Jays	3–4	Flanagan (6–7)	**Morris** (18–10)	Henke (34)	42,436	92–60	L1
153	September 25	@ Blue Jays	2–3	Musselman (12–4)	**Hernández** (3–4)		46,233	92–61	L2
154	September 26	@ Blue Jays	9–10	Núñez (5–1)	**Henneman** (9–3)		46,429	92–62	L3
155	September 27	@ Blue Jays	3–2 (13)	**Henneman** (10–3)	Núñez (5–2)	**Noles** (4)	46,346	93–62	W1
156	September 28	Orioles	0–3	Habyan (6–6)	**Morris** (18–11)	Niedenfuer (12)	20,015	93–63	L1
157	September 29	Orioles	10–1	**Tanana** (14–10)	Bell (9–13)		16,882	94–63	W1
158	September 30	Orioles	3–7	Mesa (1–3)	**Petry** (9–7)		19,434	94–64	L1

October: 4–0 (Home: 4–0; Away: 0–0)

#	Date	Opponent	Score	Win	Loss	Save	Crowd	Record	Streak
159	October 1	Orioles	9–5	**Terrell** (17–10)	Boddicker (10–12)		19,749	95–64	W1
160	October 2	Blue Jays	4–3	**Alexander** (9–0)	Clancy (15–11)	**Henneman** (7)	45,167	96–64	W2
161	October 3	Blue Jays	3–2 (12)	**Henneman** (11–3)	Musselman (12–5)		45,026	97–64	W3
162	October 4	Blue Jays	1–0	**Tanana** (15–10)	Key (17–8)		51,005	98–64	W4

== Player stats ==
= Indicates team leader

=== Batting ===
==== Starters by position ====
Note: Pos = Position; G = Games played; AB = At bats; H = Hits; Avg. = Batting average; HR = Home runs; RBI = Runs batted in

Pos	Player	G	AB	H	Avg.	HR	RBI
C	Matt Nokes	135	461	133	.289	32	87
1B	Darrell Evans	150	499	128	.257	34	99
2B	Lou Whitaker	149	604	160	.265	16	59
3B	Tom Brookens	143	444	107	.241	14	59
SS	Alan Trammell	151	597	205	.343	28	105
LF	Kirk Gibson	128	487	135	.277	24	79
CF	Chet Lemon	146	470	130	.277	20	75
RF	Pat Sheridan	141	421	109	.259	6	49
DH	Bill Madlock	87	326	91	.279	14	50

==== Other batters ====
Note: G = Games played; AB = At bats; H = Hits; Avg. = Batting average; HR = Home runs; RBI = Runs batted in

Player	G	AB	H	Avg.	HR	RBI
Mike Heath	93	270	76	.281	8	33
Larry Herndon	89	225	73	.324	9	47
Dave Bergman	91	172	47	.273	6	22
Darnell Coles	53	149	27	.181	4	15
Jim Morrison	34	117	24	.205	4	19
Johnny Grubb	59	114	23	.202	2	13
Billy Bean	26	66	17	.258	0	4
Terry Harper	31	64	13	.203	3	10
Jim Walewander	53	54	13	.241	1	4
Scott Lusader	23	47	15	.319	1	8
Dwight Lowry	13	25	5	.200	0	1
Orlando Mercado	10	22	3	.136	0	1
Tim Tolman	9	12	1	.083	0	1
Doug Baker	8	1	0	.000	0	0

=== Pitching ===
==== Starting pitchers ====
Note: G = Games pitched; IP = Innings pitched; W = Wins; L = Losses; ERA = Earned run average; SO = Strikeouts

Player	G	IP	W	L	ERA	SO
Jack Morris	34	266.0	18	11	3.38	208
Walt Terrell	35	244.2	17	10	4.05	143
Frank Tanana	34	218.2	15	10	3.91	146
Dan Petry	30	134.2	9	7	5.61	93
Jeff Robinson	29	127.1	9	6	5.37	98
Doyle Alexander	11	88.1	9	0	1.53	44

==== Relief pitchers ====
Note: G = Games pitched; W = Wins; L = Losses; SV = Saves; ERA = Earned run average; SO = Strikeouts

Player	G	W	L	SV	ERA	SO
Eric King	55	6	9	9	4.89	89
Mike Henneman	55	11	3	7	2.98	75
Willie Hernández	45	3	4	8	3.67	30
Mark Thurmond	48	0	1	5	4.23	21
Nate Snell	22	1	2	0	3.96	19
Dickie Noles	4	0	0	2	4.50	0
Bryan Kelly	5	0	1	0	5.06	10
Morris Madden	2	0	0	0	16.20	0

== Farm system ==
Level	Team	League	Manager
AAA	Toledo Mud Hens	International League	Leon Roberts
AA	Glens Falls Tigers	Eastern League	Tom Burgess, Tom Gamboa and Paul Felix
A	Lakeland Tigers	Florida State League	John Wockenfuss
A	Fayetteville Generals	South Atlantic League	Johnny Lipon
Rookie	Bristol Tigers	Appalachian League	Rick Magnante
