= List of Detroit Tigers seasons =

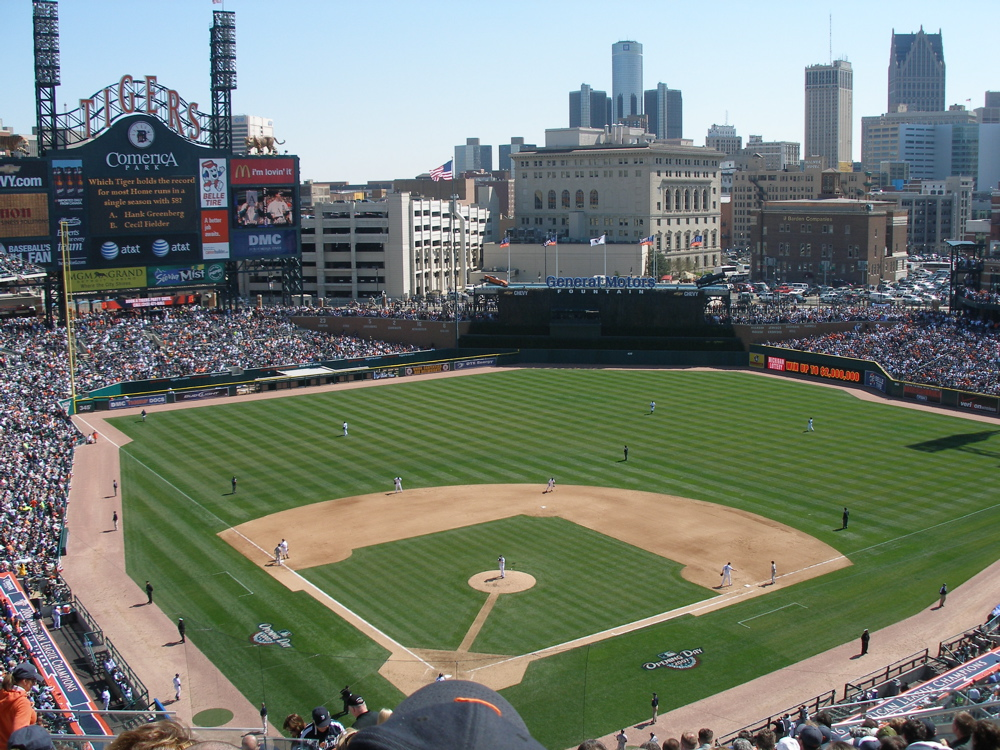
Comerica Park, home field of the Tigers since the 2000 season.

This is a list of seasons completed by the Detroit Tigers. They played in the Western League from their inception in 1894 to the 1900 season; in 1900, the league changed its named to the American League and became a major league in 1901. The Tigers have completed 124 seasons in Major League Baseball, qualifying for the postseason seventeen times and reaching the World Series eleven times (1907–1909, 1934, 1935, 1940, 1945, 1968, 1984, 2006, 2012) with four world championships (1935, 1945, 1968, 1984).

Through the efforts of team executive (and future owner) Frank Navin, the Tigers acquired a handful of talent in the first decade of the 20th century that would bear results. In 1905, the Tigers acquired Ty Cobb to join a team that had steadily acquired players of talent such as Sam Crawford, Hughie Jennings and Bill Donovan (the former two and Cobb would each reach the Hall of Fame). Cobb would play 21 years with the Tigers, and they would reach the World Series three times during his era, although they would lose each time. The end of the Cobb era in 1926 opened up a period of rebuilding that bore fruit in 1934 with a quartet of future Hall of Famers in Hank Greenberg, Goose Goslin, Charlie Gehringer, and Mickey Cochrane (they acquired the latter two in a 1934 trade). That year, they went 101–53 (with a winning percentage of .656) and won the pennant. They lost in the ensuing World Series but returned the following year after going 93–58. They lost Greenberg in Game 2 due to injury but persevered over the Chicago Cubs to win their first world championship.

After the death of Navin in 1935, Walter Briggs Sr. (a part-owner since 1919) took over as primary owner, which he would operate until his death in 1952. The Tigers toiled in mediocre play until their next pennant in 1940 while Greenberg won his second MVP award, although the Tigers lost in seven games. World War II meant that Greenberg would be away from 1941 to 1944 due to service, and the Tigers regressed despite the efforts of pitchers such as Hal Newhouser, who won the MVP Award in 1944 and 1945 (the only pitcher to win back-to-back MVP Awards). Greenberg and others would return in 1945 to help the Tigers narrowly win the AL pennant with an 88–65 record. Facing the Cubs, they won in seven games. While the Tigers would do well in the remainder of the decade while adding a future Hall of Famer in George Kell, they would not win another pennant for seventeen years (with the 1950s resulting in seven losing seasons). Briggs Sr was succeeded by his son Jr, but he would sell the team to John Fetzer and Fred Knorr in 1956. Al Kaline made his debut on the roster in 1953 and became a mainstay for the next two decades. The 1960s brought some needed sparkplug players such as Norm Cash, Willie Horton, Mickey Lolich and Denny McLain. The Tigers won 101 games in 1961 but fell short of the pennant by eight games. Six years later, they finished one game short of the Boston Red Sox for the pennant after losing the last game of the year. The following year, they would take hold of the pennant with 103 victories while McLain won the MVP Award and the Cy Young Award. In the final Series played before the division era, the Tigers defeated the St. Louis Cardinals in a classic seven-game series that saw them come back from a 3–1 series deficit. A gradual decline over the next decade was followed by the hiring of Sparky Anderson in 1979, for which he led them to the 1984 World Series championship; he retired in 1995. The next decade brought plenty of losing before manager Jim Leyland and rookie pitcher Justin Verlander helped bring them back to prominence. The Tigers would reach the World Series that year but lost in five games; they would win four consecutive division titles from 2011 to 2014 (led by Miguel Cabrera) and reach the World Series in 2012, which they lost in a sweep.

Through 124 seasons of baseball, the Tigers have recorded 72 seasons at .500 or better, 70 of which have been winning campaigns.

== Record season-by-season ==
The following table describes a season-by-season listing of the Tigers win–loss record.

World Series champions †	AL champions *	Division champions (1969–present) ^	Wild card berth (1995–present) ¤

Season	Level	League	Division	Finish	Wins	Losses	Win%	GB	Post-Season	Awards
1901	MLB	AL		3rd	74	61	.548	8½		
1902	MLB	AL		7th	52	83	.385	30½		
1903	MLB	AL		5th	65	71	.478	25		
1904	MLB	AL		7th	62	90	.408	32		
1905	MLB	AL		3rd	79	74	.516	15½		
1906	MLB	AL		6th	71	78	.477	21		
1907	MLB	AL *		1st	92	58	.613	—	Lost World Series (Cubs) 4–0 *	
1908	MLB	AL *		1st	90	63	.588	—	Lost World Series (Cubs) 4–1 *	
1909	MLB	AL *		1st	98	54	.645	—	Lost World Series (Pirates) 4–3 *	Ty Cobb (TC)
1910	MLB	AL		3rd	86	68	.558	18		
1911	MLB	AL		2nd	89	65	.578	13½		Ty Cobb (MVP)
1912	MLB	AL		6th	69	84	.451	36½		
1913	MLB	AL		6th	66	87	.431	30		
1914	MLB	AL		4th	80	73	.523	19½		
1915	MLB	AL		2nd	100	54	.649	2½		
1916	MLB	AL		3rd	87	67	.565	4		
1917	MLB	AL		4th	78	75	.510	21½		
1918	MLB	AL		7th	55	71	.437	20		
1919	MLB	AL		4th	80	60	.571	8		
1920	MLB	AL		7th	61	93	.396	37		
1921	MLB	AL		6th	71	82	.464	27		
1922	MLB	AL		3rd	79	75	.513	15		
1923	MLB	AL		2nd	83	71	.539	16		
1924	MLB	AL		3rd	86	68	.558	6		
1925	MLB	AL		4th	81	73	.526	16½		
1926	MLB	AL		6th	79	75	.513	12		
1927	MLB	AL		4th	82	71	.536	27½		
1928	MLB	AL		6th	68	86	.442	33		
1929	MLB	AL		6th	70	84	.455	36		
1930	MLB	AL		5th	75	79	.487	27		
1931	MLB	AL		7th	61	93	.396	47		
1932	MLB	AL		5th	76	75	.503	29½		
1933	MLB	AL		5th	75	79	.487	25		
1934	MLB	AL *		1st	101	53	.656	—	Lost World Series (Cardinals) 4–3 *	Mickey Cochrane (MVP)
1935	MLB †	AL *		1st	93	58	.616	—	Won World Series (Cubs) 4–2 †	Hank Greenberg (MVP)
1936	MLB	AL		2nd	83	71	.539	19½		
1937	MLB	AL		2nd	89	65	.578	13		Charlie Gehringer (MVP)
1938	MLB	AL		4th	84	70	.545	16		
1939	MLB	AL		5th	81	73	.526	26½		
1940	MLB	AL *		1st	90	64	.584	—	Lost World Series (Reds) 4–3 *	Hank Greenberg (MVP)
1941	MLB	AL		4th	75	79	.487	26		
1942	MLB	AL		5th	73	81	.474	30		
1943	MLB	AL		5th	78	76	.506	20		
1944	MLB	AL		2nd	88	66	.571	1		Hal Newhouser (MVP)
1945	MLB †	AL *		1st	88	65	.575	—	Won World Series (Cubs) 4–3 †	Hal Newhouser (MVP, TC)
1946	MLB	AL		2nd	92	62	.597	12		
1947	MLB	AL		2nd	85	69	.552	12		
1948	MLB	AL		5th	78	76	.506	18½		
1949	MLB	AL		4th	87	67	.565	10		
1950	MLB	AL		2nd	95	59	.617	3		
1951	MLB	AL		5th	73	81	.474	25		
1952	MLB	AL		8th	50	104	.325	45		
1953	MLB	AL		6th	60	94	.390	40½		Harvey Kuenn (ROY)
1954	MLB	AL		5th	68	86	.442	43		
1955	MLB	AL		5th	79	75	.513	17		
1956	MLB	AL		5th	82	72	.532	15		
1957	MLB	AL		4th	78	76	.506	20		
1958	MLB	AL		5th	77	77	.500	15		
1959	MLB	AL		4th	76	78	.494	18		
1960	MLB	AL		6th	71	83	.461	26		
1961	MLB	AL		2nd	101	61	.623	8		
1962	MLB	AL		4th	85	76	.528	10½		
1963	MLB	AL		5th	79	83	.488	25½		
1964	MLB	AL		4th	85	77	.525	14		
1965	MLB	AL		4th	89	73	.549	13		
1966	MLB	AL		3rd	88	74	.543	10		
1967	MLB	AL		3rd	91	71	.562	1		
1968	MLB †	AL *		1st	103	59	.636	—	Won World Series (Cardinals) 4–3 †	Denny McLain (MVP, CYA); Mickey Lolich (WS MVP)
1969	MLB	AL	East	2nd	90	72	.556	19		Denny McLain (CYA)
1970	MLB	AL	East	4th	79	83	.488	29		
1971	MLB	AL	East	2nd	91	71	.562	12		
1972	MLB	AL	East ^	1st	86	70	.551	—	Lost ALCS (Athletics) 3–2	
1973	MLB	AL	East	3rd	85	77	.525	12		
1974	MLB	AL	East	6th	72	90	.444	19		
1975	MLB	AL	East	6th	57	102	.358	37½		
1976	MLB	AL	East	5th	74	87	.460	24		Mark Fidrych (ROY)
1977	MLB	AL	East	4th	74	88	.457	26		
1978	MLB	AL	East	5th	86	76	.531	13½		Lou Whitaker (ROY)
1979	MLB	AL	East	5th	85	76	.528	18		
1980	MLB	AL	East	5th	84	78	.519	19		
1981	MLB	AL	East	4th	31	26	.544	3½		
1981	MLB	AL	East	3rd	29	23	.558	1½		
1982	MLB	AL	East	4th	83	79	.512	12		
1983	MLB	AL	East	2nd	92	70	.568	6		
1984	MLB †	AL *	East ^	1st	104	58	.642	—	Won ALCS (Royals) 3–0; Won World Series (Padres) 4–1 †	Willie Hernández (MVP, CYA); Sparky Anderson (MOY); Alan Trammell (WS MVP)
1985	MLB	AL	East	3rd	84	77	.522	15		
1986	MLB	AL	East	3rd	87	75	.537	8½		
1987	MLB	AL	East ^	1st	98	64	.605	—	Lost ALCS (Twins) 4–1	Sparky Anderson (MOY)
1988	MLB	AL	East	2nd	88	74	.543	1		
1989	MLB	AL	East	7th	59	103	.364	30		
1990	MLB	AL	East	3rd	79	83	.488	9		
1991	MLB	AL	East	2nd	84	78	.519	7		
1992	MLB	AL	East	6th	75	87	.463	21		
1993	MLB	AL	East	4th	85	77	.525	10		
1994	MLB	AL	East	5th	53	62	.461	18	Playoffs canceled	
1995	MLB	AL	East	4th	60	84	.417	26		
1996	MLB	AL	East	5th	53	109	.327	39		
1997	MLB	AL	East	3rd	79	83	.488	19		
1998	MLB	AL	Central	5th	65	97	.401	24		
1999	MLB	AL	Central	3rd	69	92	.429	27½		
2000	MLB	AL	Central	3rd	79	83	.488	16		
2001	MLB	AL	Central	4th	66	96	.407	25		
2002	MLB	AL	Central	5th	55	106	.342	39		
2003	MLB	AL	Central	5th	43	119	.265	47		
2004	MLB	AL	Central	4th	72	90	.444	20		
2005	MLB	AL	Central	4th	71	91	.438	28		
2006	MLB	AL *	Central	2nd ¤	95	67	.586	1	Won ALDS (Yankees) 3–1; Won ALCS (Athletics) 4–0; Lost World Series (Cardinals) 4–1 *	Justin Verlander (ROY); Jim Leyland (MOY)
2007	MLB	AL	Central	2nd	88	74	.543	8		
2008	MLB	AL	Central	5th	74	88	.457	14½		
2009	MLB	AL	Central	2nd	86	77	.528	1		
2010	MLB	AL	Central	3rd	81	81	.500	13		
2011	MLB	AL	Central ^	1st	95	67	.586	—	Won ALDS (Yankees) 3–2; Lost ALCS (Rangers) 4–2	Justin Verlander (MVP, CYA, TC)
2012	MLB	AL *	Central ^	1st	88	74	.543	—	Won ALDS (Athletics) 3–2; Won ALCS (Yankees) 4–0; Lost World Series (Giants) 4–0 *	Miguel Cabrera (MVP, TC)
2013	MLB	AL	Central ^	1st	93	69	.574	—	Won ALDS (Athletics) 3–2; Lost ALCS (Red Sox) 4–2	Miguel Cabrera (MVP); Max Scherzer (CYA)
2014	MLB	AL	Central ^	1st	90	72	.556	—	Lost ALDS (Orioles) 3–0	
2015	MLB	AL	Central	5th	74	87	.460	20½		
2016	MLB	AL	Central	2nd	86	75	.534	8		Michael Fulmer (ROY)
2017	MLB	AL	Central	5th	64	98	.395	38		
2018	MLB	AL	Central	3rd	64	98	.395	27		
2019	MLB	AL	Central	5th	47	114	.292	53½		
2020	MLB	AL	Central	5th	23	35	.397	12		
2021	MLB	AL	Central	3rd	77	85	.475	16		
2022	MLB	AL	Central	4th	66	96	.407	26		
2023	MLB	AL	Central	2nd	78	84	.481	9		
2024	MLB	AL	Central	3rd ¤	86	76	.531	6½	Won ALWC (Astros) 2–0; Lost ALDS (Guardians) 3–2	Tarik Skubal (CYA, TC)
2025	MLB	AL	Central	2nd ¤	87	75	.537	1	Won ALWC (Guardians) 2–1; Lost ALDS (Mariners) 3–2	Tarik Skubal (CYA)
2026	MLB	AL	Central	4th	76	86	.469	9		Kevin McGonigle (ROY)
Totals					Wins	Losses	Win%			
Totals					9,839	9,728	.503	All-time regular season record (1901–2026)		
Totals					64	68	.485	All-time postseason record		
Totals					9,903	9,796	.503	All-time regular and postseason record		

== Record by decade ==
The following table describes the Tigers' MLB win–loss record by decade.

Decade	Wins	Losses	Win %
1900s	683	632	.519
1910s	790	704	.529
1920s	760	778	.494
1930s	818	716	.533
1940s	834	705	.542
1950s	738	802	.479
1960s	882	729	.547
1970s	789	820	.490
1980s	839	727	.536
1990s	702	852	.452
2000s	729	891	.450
2010s	782	835	.484
2020s	493	537	.479
All-time	9,839	9,728	.503

== Postseason record by year ==
The Tigers have made the postseason eighteen times in their history, with their first being in 1907 and the most recent being in 2025.

Year	Finish	Round	Opponent	Result		
1907	American League Champions	World Series	Chicago Cubs	Lost	0	4
1908	American League Champions	World Series	Chicago Cubs	Lost	1	4
1909	American League Champions	World Series	Pittsburgh Pirates	Lost	3	4
1934	American League Champions	World Series	St. Louis Cardinals	Lost	3	4
1935	World Series Champions	World Series	Chicago Cubs	Won	4	2
1940	American League Champions	World Series	Cincinnati Reds	Lost	3	4
1945	World Series Champions	World Series	Chicago Cubs	Won	4	3
1968	World Series Champions	World Series	St. Louis Cardinals	Won	4	3
1972	American League East Champions	ALCS	Oakland Athletics	Lost	2	3
1984	World Series Champions	ALCS	Kansas City Royals	Won	3	0
1984	World Series Champions	World Series	San Diego Padres	Won	4	1
1987	American League East Champions	ALCS	Minnesota Twins	Lost	1	4
2006	American League Champions	ALDS	New York Yankees	Won	3	1
2006	American League Champions	ALCS	Oakland Athletics	Won	4	0
2006	American League Champions	World Series	St. Louis Cardinals	Lost	1	4
2011	American League Central Champions	ALDS	New York Yankees	Won	3	2
2011	American League Central Champions	ALCS	Texas Rangers	Lost	2	4
2012	American League Champions	ALDS	Oakland Athletics	Won	3	2
2012	American League Champions	ALCS	New York Yankees	Won	4	0
2012	American League Champions	World Series	San Francisco Giants	Lost	0	4
2013	American League Central Champions	ALDS	Oakland Athletics	Won	3	2
2013	American League Central Champions	ALCS	Boston Red Sox	Lost	2	4
2014	American League Central Champions	ALDS	Baltimore Orioles	Lost	0	3
2024	American League Wild Card	Wild Card Series	Houston Astros	Won	2	0
2024	American League Wild Card	ALDS	Cleveland Guardians	Lost	2	3
2025	American League Wild Card	Wild Card Series	Cleveland Guardians	Won	2	1
2025	American League Wild Card	ALDS	Seattle Mariners	Lost	2	3
18	Totals			13–14	65	69 (Note: Includes a tied Game 1 of the 1907 World Series)

== Best seasons in Detroit Tigers history ==
Best Seasons in Detroit Tigers History
Rank	Year	Wins	Losses	Win %	Finish
1	1934	101	53	.656	Lost 1934 World Series to Cardinals
2	1915	100	54	.649	2nd in AL behind Red Sox
3	1909	98	54	.645	Lost 1909 World Series to Pirates
4	1984	104	58	.642	Won 1984 World Series over Padres
5	1968	103	59	.636	Won 1968 World Series over Cardinals
6	1961	101	61	.623	2nd in AL behind Yankees
7	1950	95	59	.617	2nd in AL behind Yankees
8	1935	93	58	.616	Won 1935 World Series over Cubs
9	1907	92	58	.613	Lost 1907 World Series to Cubs
10	1987	98	64	.605	Lost 1987 ALCS to Twins
11	1946	92	62	.597	2nd in AL behind Red Sox
12	1908	90	63	.588	Lost 1908 World Series to Cubs
13	2006	95	67	.586	Lost 2006 World Series to Cardinals
13	2011	95	67	.586	Lost 2011 ALCS to Rangers
15	1940	90	64	.584	Lost 1940 World Series to Reds
16	1911	89	65	.578	2nd in AL behind A's
16	1937	89	65	.578	2nd in AL behind Yankees
18	1945	88	65	.575	Won 1945 World Series over Cubs
19	2013	93	69	.574	Lost 2013 ALCS to Red Sox
20	1944	88	66	.571	2nd in AL behind Browns

== Worst seasons in Detroit Tigers history ==
Worst Seasons in Detroit Tigers History
Rank	Year	Wins	Losses	Win %
1	2003	43	119	.265
2	2019	47	114	.292
3	1952	50	104	.325
4	1996	53	109	.327
5	2002	55	106	.342
6	1975	57	102	.358

== See also ==
- History of the Detroit Tigers
