= 1987 American League Championship Series =

19th edition of Major League Baseball's American League Championship Series

Team (Wins)	Managers	Season
Minnesota Twins (4)	Tom Kelly	85–77, .525, GA: 2
Detroit Tigers (1)	Sparky Anderson	98–64, .605, GA: 2
- Dates: October 7–12
- MVP: Gary Gaetti (Minnesota)
- Umpires: Joe Brinkman (crew chief); Durwood Merrill; Drew Coble; Al Clark; Mike Reilly; Jim McKean

Broadcast
- Television: NBC
- TV announcers: Bob Costas and Tony Kubek
- Radio: CBS
- Radio announcers: Brent Musburger and Bill White

The 1987 American League Championship Series was a semifinal series in Major League Baseball’s 1987 postseason that pitted the Minnesota Twins, the American League West champions, against the Detroit Tigers, the American League East champions. Minnesota won the Series four games to one, en route to winning the 1987 World Series four games to three over the St. Louis Cardinals.

== Background ==
The Detroit Tigers finished the 1987 regular season with the best record in all of baseball, at 98–64 (.605). They won the American League East by two games in thrilling fashion over the Toronto Blue Jays, overcoming a 3½-game deficit with a week to go, and clinching the division—and their second postseason appearance in four years—on the last day of the season with a 1–0 win over Toronto at Tiger Stadium.

The Twins, by contrast, finished with the worst record of any of the four teams that made the playoffs, at 85–77 (.525). Although they held off the Kansas City Royals by two games to take the American League West, they were clearly seen as the underdogs against the power of the Tigers in the 1987 ALCS.

== Summary ==
=== Minnesota Twins vs. Detroit Tigers ===
Minnesota won the series, 4–1.

Game	Date	Score	Location	Time	Attendance
1	October 7	Detroit Tigers – 5, Minnesota Twins – 8	Hubert H. Humphrey Metrodome	2:46	53,269
2	October 8	Detroit Tigers – 3, Minnesota Twins – 6	Hubert H. Humphrey Metrodome	2:54	55,245
3	October 10	Minnesota Twins – 6, Detroit Tigers – 7	Tiger Stadium	3:29	49,730
4	October 11	Minnesota Twins – 5, Detroit Tigers – 3	Tiger Stadium	3:24	51,939
5	October 12	Minnesota Twins – 9, Detroit Tigers – 5	Tiger Stadium	3:14	47,448

== Game summaries ==
=== Game 1 ===
Wednesday, October 7, 1987, at Hubert H. Humphrey Metrodome in Minneapolis, Minnesota

Team	1	2	3	4	5	6	7	8	9	R	H	E
Detroit	0	0	1	0	0	1	1	2	0	5	10	0
Minnesota	0	1	0	0	3	0	0	4	X	8	10	0
WP: Jeff Reardon (1–0) LP: Doyle Alexander (0–1); Home runs: DET: Mike Heath (1), Kirk Gibson (1); MIN: Gary Gaetti 2 (2)

The 1987 AL playoffs opened at the Hubert H. Humphrey Metrodome, with the Tigers throwing Doyle Alexander against the Twins' Frank Viola. In the bottom of the second, the Twins opened the scoring when third baseman Gary Gaetti homered off Alexander to give Minnesota a 1–0 lead. However, Detroit answered back the very next half-inning, as catcher Mike Heath homered to center field to tie the game. The game remained tied until the bottom of the fifth, when the Twins erupted for three runs. Gaetti led off the inning with his second round-tripper of the game, and Randy Bush followed by stroking a triple to right field and coming home on a double by Tom Brunansky. Steve Lombardozzi sacrificed Brunansky to third, and he scored on a subsequent base hit by Dan Gladden to make it 4–1.

Beginning in the top half of the sixth, however, Detroit staged a comeback. Kirk Gibson hit a home run that inning, and then Heath ripped an RBI single in the seventh that scored Larry Herndon to cut Minnesota's lead down to one. In the top of the eighth, the Tigers took a one-run lead with a pair of sacrifice flies off Twins reliever Jeff Reardon that scored Gibson and Alan Trammell.

In the bottom of the eighth, however, Minnesota took the lead for good. A double by Kirby Puckett brought Gladden home to tie the game, and Don Baylor and Brunansky drove in the go-ahead runs off Willie Hernández with a single and double, respectively. A single by Johnny Grubb and a walk to Lou Whitaker was all the Tigers could muster against Reardon in the ninth, as Gibson struck out to give the Twins an 8–5 victory and a 1–0 lead in the series. This was the Twins' first postseason win since Game 6 of the 1965 World Series.

=== Game 2 ===
Thursday, October 8, 1987, at Hubert H. Humphrey Metrodome in Minneapolis, Minnesota

Team	1	2	3	4	5	6	7	8	9	R	H	E
Detroit	0	2	0	0	0	0	0	1	0	3	7	1
Minnesota	0	3	0	2	1	0	0	0	X	6	6	0
WP: Bert Blyleven (1–0) LP: Jack Morris (0–1) Sv: Juan Berenguer (1); Home runs: DET: Chet Lemon (1), Lou Whitaker (1); MIN: Kent Hrbek (1)

For Game 2, the Twins sent Bert Blyleven to the hill against Detroit's ace, Jack Morris. In the top of the second, the Tigers opened the scoring when Chet Lemon hit a two-run home run off Blyleven. In the bottom half of the inning, however, the Twins stormed back, as Gaetti doubled to right and scored on another double by Brunansky. After a walk to Greg Gagne, catcher Tim Laudner hit the third double of the inning off Morris, scoring both Brunansky and Gagne for a 3–2 Minnesota lead.

The Twins extended their lead in the fourth, as Bush singled and then stole second and third. After consecutive walks to Brunansky and Gagne, Gladden singled to left to drive in Bush and Brunansky. Kent Hrbek then added a homer in the fifth, giving Minnesota a 6–2 lead. Tigers second baseman Lou Whitaker touched Blyleven for a homer in the eighth, but the Twins hurler would allow nothing more. Former Tiger Juan Berenguer struck out the side in the ninth to hand the Twins a 6–3 victory and a 2–0 series lead.

=== Game 3 ===
Saturday, October 10, 1987, at Tiger Stadium in Detroit, Michigan

Team	1	2	3	4	5	6	7	8	9	R	H	E
Minnesota	0	0	0	2	0	2	2	0	0	6	8	1
Detroit	0	0	5	0	0	0	0	2	X	7	7	0
WP: Mike Henneman (1–0) LP: Jeff Reardon (1–1); Home runs: MIN: Greg Gagne (1), Tom Brunansky (1); DET: Pat Sheridan (1)

The Series shifted to Detroit for Game 3, with the Tigers' Walt Terrell facing the Twins' Les Straker. The two pitchers matched zeroes for the first two-and-a-half innings until the bottom of the third, when Detroit's Pat Sheridan doubled to left, moved to third on a single by Whitaker, and scored on a force out by Gibson that sent Whitaker to third. After Gibson stole second, a balk by Straker scored Whitaker, and a single by Trammell brought in Gibson. A double by Herndon then scored Trammell and Lemon to give the Tigers a 5–0 lead.

In the top of the fourth, the Twins cut Detroit's lead to 5–2 with a Gagne home run and a Bush single that scored Hrbek, and in the sixth they reduced the lead down to one with a two-run homer by Brunansky. In the top of the seventh, a two-out single by Gaetti drove in Gladden and Gagne to give the Twins a 6–5 lead and put them on the cusp of taking a stranglehold on the series.

Facing the prospect of blowing a 5–0 lead and falling behind three games to none, the Tigers rallied in the bottom of the eighth. Minnesota brought in Reardon to get a two-inning save, but Herndon greeted him with a leadoff single. After Tigers manager Sparky Anderson sent Morris in to run for Herndon, Reardon got Tom Brookens to pop out to Hrbek on a sacrifice bunt attempt. Pat Sheridan, 1 for 6 lifetime against Reardon, hit the first pitch he saw into the upper deck in right field for a two-run home run that restored Detroit's lead, 7–6. In the top of the ninth, Mike Henneman retired the Twins in order to put the Tigers back in the Series, which now stood at 2–1 for Minnesota.

=== Game 4 ===
Sunday, October 11, 1987, at Tiger Stadium in Detroit, Michigan

Team	1	2	3	4	5	6	7	8	9	R	H	E
Minnesota	0	0	1	1	1	1	0	1	0	5	7	1
Detroit	1	0	0	0	1	1	0	0	0	3	7	3
WP: Frank Viola (1–0) LP: Frank Tanana (0–1) Sv: Jeff Reardon (1); Home runs: MIN: Kirby Puckett (1), Greg Gagne (2); DET: None

The fourth game of the series matched Viola against Tiger left-hander Frank Tanana, who had thrown a 1–0 complete-game shutout over the Toronto Blue Jays on the final day of the regular season to punch Detroit's playoff ticket.

In the bottom of the first, the Tigers gave Tanana a 1–0 lead when Lou Whitaker walked to lead off the inning and eventually scored on a throwing error by Twins shortstop Greg Gagne. However, in the top of the third, Kirby Puckett homered off Tanana to tie the game, then Gagne added a homer in the top of the fourth to give Minnesota a 2–1 lead. The Twins made it a 3–1 lead in the fifth when Puckett came home on a Gary Gaetti sacrifice fly, but the Tigers came to within a run in the bottom of the fifth when an infield hit by Kirk Gibson scored Whitaker.

In the top of the sixth, Gagne doubled, moved to third on a wild pitch, and scored on a base hit by pinch-hitter Gene Larkin to give Minnesota a 4–2 advantage. In the bottom half of the inning, the Tigers again clawed to within a run when pinch-hitter Dave Bergman followed up singles by Chet Lemon and Darrell Evans with a single of his own, scoring Lemon and moving Evans to second. After Mike Heath sacrificed Evans to third and Bergman to second, Twins manager Tom Kelly pulled Keith Atherton in favour of Juan Berenguer. However, the Tiger rally was squelched when catcher Tim Laudner picked a stunned Evans off third and Berenguer induced a flyout from Jim Morrison to end the inning.

In the eighth, the Twins restored their two-run lead when Laudner reached on an error by Evans (who was playing third base, as Bergman had stayed in the game as the first baseman) and came home to score on a single by Steve Lombardozzi. In the ninth, Reardon managed to preserve a 5–3 Twins win, putting them one victory away from the pennant. This was the first road postseason victory for the Washington Senators/Minnesota Twins franchise since Game 1 of the 1925 World Series.

=== Game 5 ===
Monday, October 12, 1987, at Tiger Stadium in Detroit, Michigan

Team	1	2	3	4	5	6	7	8	9	R	H	E
Minnesota	0	4	0	0	0	0	1	1	3	9	15	1
Detroit	0	0	0	3	0	0	0	1	1	5	9	1
WP: Bert Blyleven (2–0) LP: Doyle Alexander (0–2) Sv: Jeff Reardon (2); Home runs: MIN: Tom Brunansky (2); DET: Matt Nokes (1), Chet Lemon (2)

In what would turn out to be the last postseason game played at Tiger Stadium, the Twins would send Blyleven to the mound to face the Tigers' Doyle Alexander.

In the top of the second, Minnesota drew first blood when Tom Brunansky doubled home Gary Gaetti and Randy Bush, but was thrown out trying to stretch his hit into a triple. Dan Gladden and Kirby Puckett added RBI base hits of their own to give the Twins a 4–0 lead, and Tigers manager Sparky Anderson replaced Alexander with Eric King.

As they had several times during the series, Detroit cut the Twins' lead down to one run in the bottom of the fourth, when Kirk Gibson scored on an Alan Trammell single and Matt Nokes followed with a two-run homer that scored Trammell. In the top of the seventh, however, the Twins restored their two-run lead when Kent Hrbek singled, moved to second when Gaetti was hit by a pitch, took third on a wild pitch by King, and plated on a sacrifice fly by Bush.

In the eighth, Tiger reliever Mike Henneman, who replaced King in the seventh, allowed a double to Gladden and a walk to Gagne. Puckett then grounded to Henneman, who attempted to initiate a double play. However, first baseman Darrell Evans misplayed the ball for his second error of the series, allowing Gladden to score and make it a 6–3 Minnesota lead. Although Chet Lemon homered for Detroit in the bottom half of the inning to make it 6–4, the Twins decisively stormed ahead in the top of the ninth. Brunansky hit his second home run of the postseason, and Gladden and Gagne followed with consecutive RBI doubles off Henneman and Jeff Robinson.

The Twins sent Reardon, who entered the game in the bottom of the eighth, to the hill to close out the series in the bottom of the ninth. Although an RBI single by Gibson scored Jim Morrison, the Minnesota stopper allowed nothing more, as Matt Nokes grounded out to Reardon to end a 9–5 Twins victory and clinch the franchise's first World Series berth since 1965.

This was the last postseason appearance by the Tigers until 2006.

== Composite box ==
1987 ALCS (4–1): Minnesota Twins over Detroit Tigers

Team	1	2	3	4	5	6	7	8	9	R	H	E
Minnesota Twins	0	8	1	5	5	3	3	6	3	34	46	3
Detroit Tigers	1	2	6	3	1	2	1	6	1	23	40	5
Total attendance: 257,631 Average attendance: 51,526

== Aftermath ==
A week later, the Twins won their first of two World Championships over the span of five years.

On January 22, 1988, an arbitrator's ruling made Kirk Gibson a free agent. A few days later, Gibson signed with the Dodgers and turned in one of the more mythical seasons in baseball history. In spring training, he set a fire under a Dodgers team that had lost 89 games in back-to-back seasons. He would go on to win the National League Most Valuable Player Award and hit one of the most famous home runs in baseball history to win Game 1 of the World Series, which was his only at-bat of the series due to injury. Gibson returned to the Tigers in 1993 and played the last three seasons of his career there until his retirement.

After the 1993 season, MLB owners and the MLBPA agreed to re-align and create a third Central division in each league as part of their collective bargaining agreement. The Twins moved to the newly added American League Central in 1994 and the Tigers followed them in 1998 after the Milwaukee Brewers moved to the National League and the Tampa Bay Devil Rays were formed, taking the Tigers’ place in the American League East. In 2009, the two teams played for both the division and a playoff berth in the Game 163 2009 American League Central tie-breaker game, a legendary contest which the Twins ultimately won by the score of 6–5 in extra innings. Outside of 2009, the only other time the Tigers and Twins finished 1–v2 in the standings was in 2006, when the Twins clinched on the last day of the season after never having held sole possession of first place (they were the first team in MLB history to accomplish this feat). However, the Tigers still made the playoffs as a wildcard and made it further than the Twins by winning the American League pennant, before losing to the St. Louis Cardinals in the World Series.

Only three years removed from their historic 1984 season, where they won 104 games, swept the Royals in the ALCS and then won the World Series in five games over San Diego, this would be the closest that the Tigers would get to going back to the World Series in the Sparky Anderson-era. Detroit had an 18-year postseason drought, as they would not play October postseason baseball again until the year 2006, by which time Anderson and all the players on those teams had long since retired.
