= Pat Sheridan (disambiguation) =

Pat Sheridan may refer to:

- Pat Sheridan (musician), Guitarist for Fit for an Autopsy
- Pat Sheridan (baseball player), American baseball player
