= Morris Madden =

American baseball player (born 1960)

- Pitcher
- Born: August 31, 1960 (age 66); Laurens, South Carolina, U.S.
- Batted: Left Threw: Left

MLB debut
- June 11, 1987, for the Detroit Tigers

Last MLB appearance
- June 23, 1989, for the Pittsburgh Pirates

MLB statistics
- Win–loss record: 2–2
- Earned run average: 5.91
- Strikeouts: 9
- Stats at Baseball Reference

Teams
- Detroit Tigers (1987); Pittsburgh Pirates (1988–1989)

Morris DeWayne Madden (born August 31, 1960) is an American former professional baseball pitcher who played for the Detroit Tigers and the Pittsburgh Pirates of Major League Baseball (MLB) between 1987 and 1989. He batted and threw left-handed.

== Career ==
After playing for Spartanburg Methodist College, Madden was drafted by the Los Angeles Dodgers in the 24th round of the 1979 Major League Baseball draft. He spent the first several years of his professional career in the minor leagues in the Dodgers, Cincinnati Reds, and Detroit Tigers organizations, before making his major league debut with the Tigers on June 11, 1987.

On August 12, 1987, Madden (along with Darnell Coles) was traded by the Tigers to the Pittsburgh Pirates in exchange for Jim Morrison. (Note: Madden was revealed to be the player to be named later in the trade on August 12. The original trade occurred on August 7.)

Madden appeared in 14 major league games with the Pirates between 1988 and 1989, where he went 2-2 with a 5.03 ERA with Pittsburgh. He spent most of his time in the Pirates organization with the Triple-A Buffalo Bisons. Madden appeared in 47 games over two seasons in Buffalo, where he recorded 17 wins and a 3.43 ERA in 47 games. Madden played his last season in 1990 in the Dodgers organization with the Triple-A Albuquerque Dukes before retiring.

== Post-playing career ==
Following the end of his playing career, Madden stayed in baseball as a coach and instructor for youth athletes in Charlotte, North Carolina. In 2018, Madden, along with Jeff Schaefer, co-founded the Knothole Foundation, a nonprofit organization that aims to increase access to baseball and softball for underserved boys and girls, with teams ranging from the ages of 4 to 18. The foundation participates in MLB's Reviving Baseball in Inner Cities (RBI) program.
