= Jim Walewander =

American baseball player (born 1962)

- Second baseman
- Born: May 2, 1962 (age 64); Chicago, Illinois, U.S.
- Batted: Both Threw: Right

MLB debut
- May 31, 1987, for the Detroit Tigers

Last MLB appearance
- October 3, 1993, for the California Angels

MLB statistics
- Batting average: .215
- Home runs: 1
- Runs batted in: 14
- Stats at Baseball Reference

Teams
- Detroit Tigers (1987–1988); New York Yankees (1990); California Angels (1993)

Jim "Wales" Walewander (born May 2, 1962) is an American former professional baseball infielder. Walewander was drafted by the Detroit Tigers in the 9th round of the 1983 Major League Baseball draft. During his professional career, he played for the Tigers, New York Yankees and California Angels of Major League Baseball (MLB). He attended Iowa State University and is an alumnus of Arizona State University and UCLA.

== Career ==
As an infielder, Walewander's advancement to the majors was delayed by shortstop Alan Trammell and second baseman Lou Whitaker. "Wales" was finally summoned to Detroit on May 31, 1987, going 1 for 2 against the Minnesota Twins. Walewander primarily appeared as a defensive substitute or pinch-runner in the late innings. He was a key figure as the Tigers battled the Toronto Blue Jays for the division crown. In the 12th inning of the season's penultimate game against Toronto, pinch-hitter Walewander scooted home with the game-winning run after Trammell drilled a game-winning single through Toronto shortstop Manuel Lee's legs. Detroit won the division title the next day via a Frank Tanana 1–0 shutout. Walewander was not on the playoff roster, and Minnesota defeated Tigers in the ALCS.

Walewander had his own quirky style that endeared him to the fans of Detroit, who felt compelled to start The Jimmy Walewander Fan Club. His behavior was often interpreted as unconventional. He played 18 holes of golf wearing combat boots, but that was because he left his spikes at home. He used tin foil as curtains to cover the window in his Minor League apartment, because that was the only thing that kept sun out. When asked how he found Mark Langston, one of the first pitchers Walewander faced in the Major Leagues, Walewander responded, "I walked from the on-deck circle to the batter's box and there he was on the mound." Walewander was also a fan of the Philadelphia punk band The Dead Milkmen. The punk rockers were guests in the dugout when Walewander hit his only major-league home run.

A local Tigers fan, named "Eastside Billee" a.k.a. William Speelman, wrote a "theme song" for Walewander, called "The Jim Walewander Blues", and recorded it with his band The Ten Speeds. The song got radio airplay in the Lakeland, Florida area during spring training one year. Broadcaster Ernie Harwell even gave a Detroit newspaper review of the song in an article written by Shelby Strother. The song, and its lyrics, were also mentioned in a Sports Illustrated article regarding Walewander.

Wales played one more year with the Tigers before his release. He played with the New York Yankees and then in Italy before his last game, in a California Angels uniform in 1993.

For his Major League career, Walewander batted .215 with a home run and 14 RBI in 242 at-bats. Walewander's 24 runs scored on only 13 hits during the 1987 season represents the all-time record for the highest 'runs to hits' ratio (1.846) for a major league season for players with 10 or more hits.

After leaving baseball, Walewander earned his undergraduate degree from Arizona State University and an MBA from the UCLA Anderson School of Management.

== Athletic history ==
=== Professional ===
The Detroit Tigers signed Walewander in the 9th round of the 1983 MLB amateur draft.

- In 1983 he was voted MVP by the fans of the 1983 Rookie League Bristol Tigers.
- In 1984 & 1985 he was voted to the Florida State League (A-Ball) all-star team by coaches and reporters.
- In 1986 he was voted to the Eastern League (AA) all-star team by coaches and reporters.
- In 1987, he started the season with the Tigers' AAA affiliate, the Toledo Mud Hens in Toledo, Ohio.
- In 1987, he was called up to the Detroit Tigers on May 30.
- He was on the Tiger team that won the 1987 American League East Division Championship.
- In 1988, he was on the team that placed second in the American League East Division – one game behind the Boston Red Sox
- In 1988, he was 2nd on the team in stolen bases
- In 1989, he played on the Detroit Tigers' AAA team, the Mud Hens, in Toledo, Ohio.

==== Yankees ====
- He was picked up as a free agent with the New York Yankees organization in the 1989 off season.
- In 1990, he played most of the season with the Yankee AAA affiliate, the Columbus Clippers in Columbus, Ohio. There he led International League in stolen bases and second in runs scored. Wale wander was called up to the Yankees in September.
- In 1991 Walewander led the league in stolen bases for a second straight season. That year, the Columbus Clippers won the AAA International League Championship.

==== Mediolanum Milano ====
- In 1992 Walewander played in Milan, Italy with the Mediolanum Milano baseball team, owned at the time by Silvio Berlusconi.
- While there, his team won the Coppa della Coppa Tournament in Amsterdam.
- Mid-season Walewander incurred an injury and returned to the US.

==== Texas Rangers ====
- Upon return to the United States from Italy, Walewander was picked up by the Texas Ranger AAA organization - the Oklahoma City 89ers.
- He finished off the season helping them win the 1992 American Association Championship.

==== California Angels ====
- In 1993, Walewander was picked up by the California Angels organization and played in their AAA affiliate, the Vancouver Canadians.
- At the end of the season, he was named Most Versatile Player. Walewander was called up to the Angels in July and September

==== Florida Marlins ====
- In 1994, Walewander signed with the Florida Marlins AAA team - the Edmonton Trappers.

=== College ===
- For college, Walewander attended Iowa State University in Ames, Iowa.
- He broke the Big-8 Conference record for stolen bases and walks in a season in 1982.
- He earned All-Conference, All-Tournament and All-Academic designations in 1983.
- He was drafted in the 9th round of the 1983 MLB amateur draft.

=== High school ===
- Prior to his professional career, Walewander attended Maine South High School (the same school Hillary Clinton attended) in Park Ridge, Illinois where he played baseball and basketball.
- His basketball team won the Illinois High School Boys Championship in 1979.
- His baseball team came in 3rd in State for Baseball in 1980.
- Walewander won Maine South Athlete of the Year in 1980.
