= Jeff Robinson (starting pitcher) =

American baseball player (1961–2014)

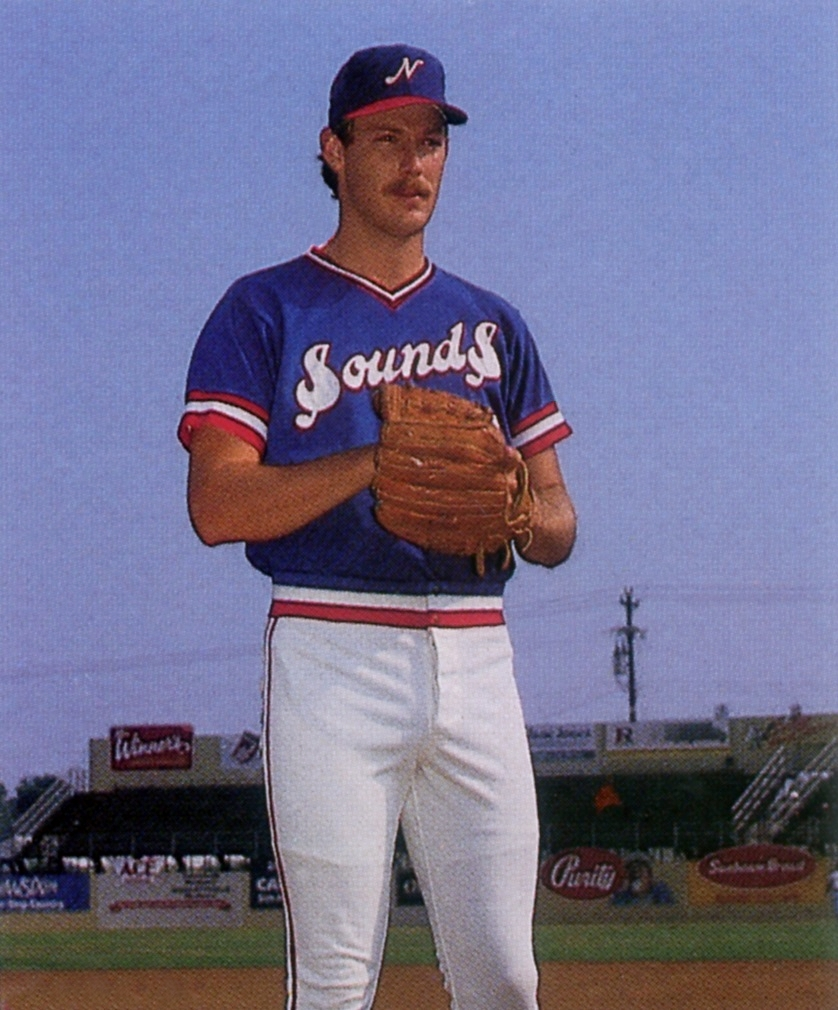
- Robinson with the Nashville Sounds in 1986
- Pitcher
- Born: December 14, 1961; Ventura, California, U.S.
- Died: October 26, 2014 (aged 52); Overland Park, Kansas, U.S.
- Batted: Right Threw: Right

MLB debut
- April 12, 1987, for the Detroit Tigers

Last MLB appearance
- July 20, 1992, for the Pittsburgh Pirates

MLB statistics
- Win–loss record: 47–40
- Earned run average: 4.79
- Strikeouts: 425
- Stats at Baseball Reference

Teams
- Detroit Tigers (1987–1990); Baltimore Orioles (1991); Texas Rangers (1992); Pittsburgh Pirates (1992)

Jeffrey Mark Robinson (December 14, 1961 – October 26, 2014) was an American right-handed pitcher who spent six seasons from 1987 to 1992 in Major League Baseball (MLB) with the Detroit Tigers (1987–1990), Baltimore Orioles (1991), Texas Rangers (1992) and Pittsburgh Pirates (1992).

== Professional career ==
Robinson was drafted out of Christian High School, El Cajon, California, by the Toronto Blue Jays in the seventeenth round (419th overall) in 1979 and the San Diego Padres in the fortieth round (817th overall) in 1980. Instead of signing a professional baseball contract out of high school, Robinson chose college and played both basketball and baseball at Azusa Pacific Christian College (now Azusa Pacific University). He did not sign a professional contract until being selected by the Tigers in the third round (69th overall) of the 1983 Major League Baseball draft. He spent the next three seasons in the Tigers' minor league system before making the major league club out of spring training in 1987.

In his first season in the majors, Robinson appeared in the 1987 ALCS as a member of the Tigers against the Minnesota Twins. He pitched to two batters in Game 5, giving up a run-scoring double to Greg Gagne before getting Kirby Puckett to ground out to end the top of the 9th inning. Robinson's best season came in 1988, his second season in the major leagues, when he won 13 games, and finished with a 2.98 ERA. Robinson spent three more seasons in Detroit, compiling a record of 36–26, with a 4.65 ERA.

He was traded by the Tigers to the Baltimore Orioles for Mickey Tettleton on January 12, 1991. Robinson was 4–9 with a 5.18 ERA and failed to complete five innings eight times in nineteen starts with the Orioles. After only one winning decision in his last 11 starts, he was optioned to the Rochester Red Wings in a July 30 transaction that also included the promotion of Mike Mussina to the majors. Irate over the demotion, Robinson went 1–2 with a 6.43 ERA in eight games for the Red Wings before a hip injury ended his season on August 21. He was released by the Orioles on November 13, 1991.

Robinson split the first part of 1992 between the Texas Rangers and the Pittsburgh Pirates. For the first time in his career, Robinson was used more often in relief (13 times) than as a starter (11 times). In July, he was released by the Pirates, only to be brought back to the Tigers' organization, as he pitched the rest of the season for their Triple-A affiliate, the Toledo Mud Hens. He never again pitched in the majors, and retired before the following spring training.

Robinson finished his career with a record of 47–40 and a 4.79 ERA in 141 career games. During his career, Robinson was often referred to as "Jeff M. Robinson" to differentiate him from Jeff D. Robinson, whose career overlapped his.

== Death ==
Robinson died on October 26, 2014, at the age of 52 after a seven-week battle with undisclosed health issues. Prior to his death, he had been a pitching director, coach and instructor with the Olathe, Kansas-based Natural Baseball Academy.

Preceded by Jimmy Key	AL hits per nine innings 1988	Succeeded by Nolan Ryan
