= Nate Snell =

American baseball player (born 1959)

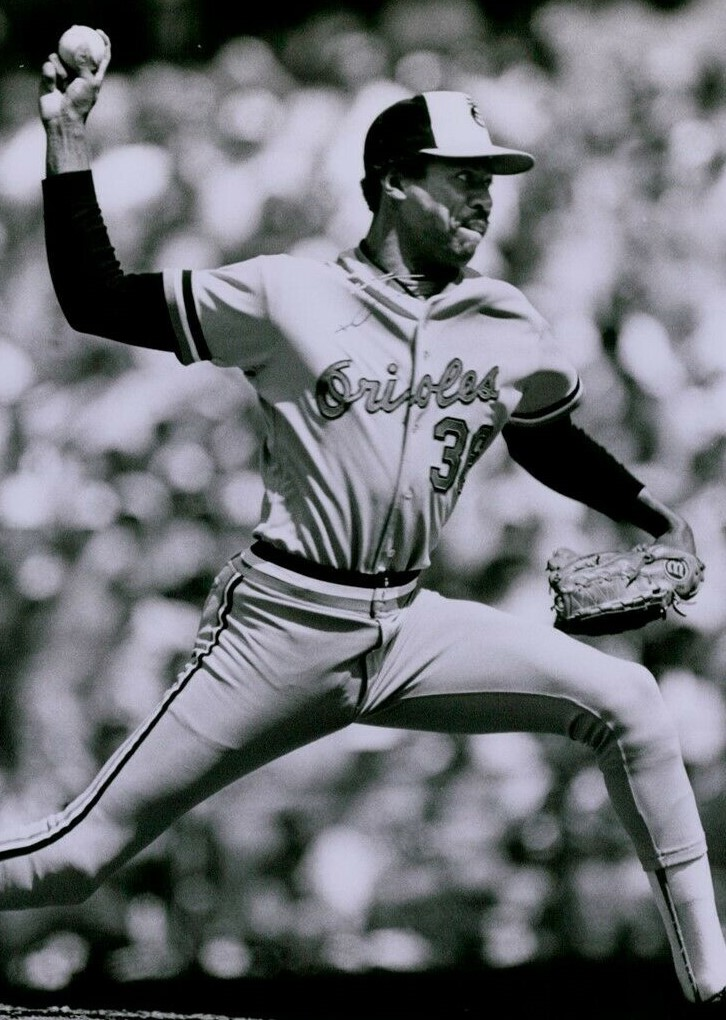
- Pitcher
- Born: September 2, 1959 (age 66); Orangeburg, South Carolina, U.S.
- Batted: Right Threw: Right

MLB debut
- September 20, 1984, for the Baltimore Orioles

Last MLB appearance
- September 29, 1987, for the Detroit Tigers

MLB statistics
- Win–loss record: 7–6
- Earned run average: 3.29
- Strikeouts: 96
- Stats at Baseball Reference

Teams
- Baltimore Orioles (1984–1986); Detroit Tigers (1987)

Nathaniel Snell (born September 2, 1959) is an American former professional baseball pitcher, who played in Major League Baseball (MLB) for the Baltimore Orioles and Detroit Tigers, for four seasons.

Snell was signed by the Orioles as an amateur free agent in September 1976, right after the completion of that year's Minor League season. He played his first professional season with their Class A-Advanced Miami Orioles in 1977, and split his last season with the Class A-Advanced Miami Marlins and the Cincinnati Reds' Double-A Chattanooga Lookouts and Triple-A Nashville Sounds in 1988. Snell spent parts of seven seasons in the minor leagues before getting called up during the 1984 season on September 20. He threw a total of 7 2/3 innings that season, giving up only 2 earned runs and striking out seven. Snell was a regular in the Baltimore bullpen for all of 1985 and 1986, compiling a 2.69 ERA in 100 innings in 1985, and a 3.86 ERA in 72 innings in 1986.

After the 1986 season, Snell signed a free agent contract with the Detroit Tigers. He pitched 38 innings, compiling a 3.86 ERA with a 1-2 record. After that season, Snell threw a few more seasons in the minor leagues for the Cincinnati Reds organization, and ultimately retired after 1990.

Snell finished his major league career with a 7-6 record, a 3.29 ERA, 5 saves, 96 strikeouts, and a 1.31 WHIP.
