= Walt Terrell =

American baseball player (born 1958)

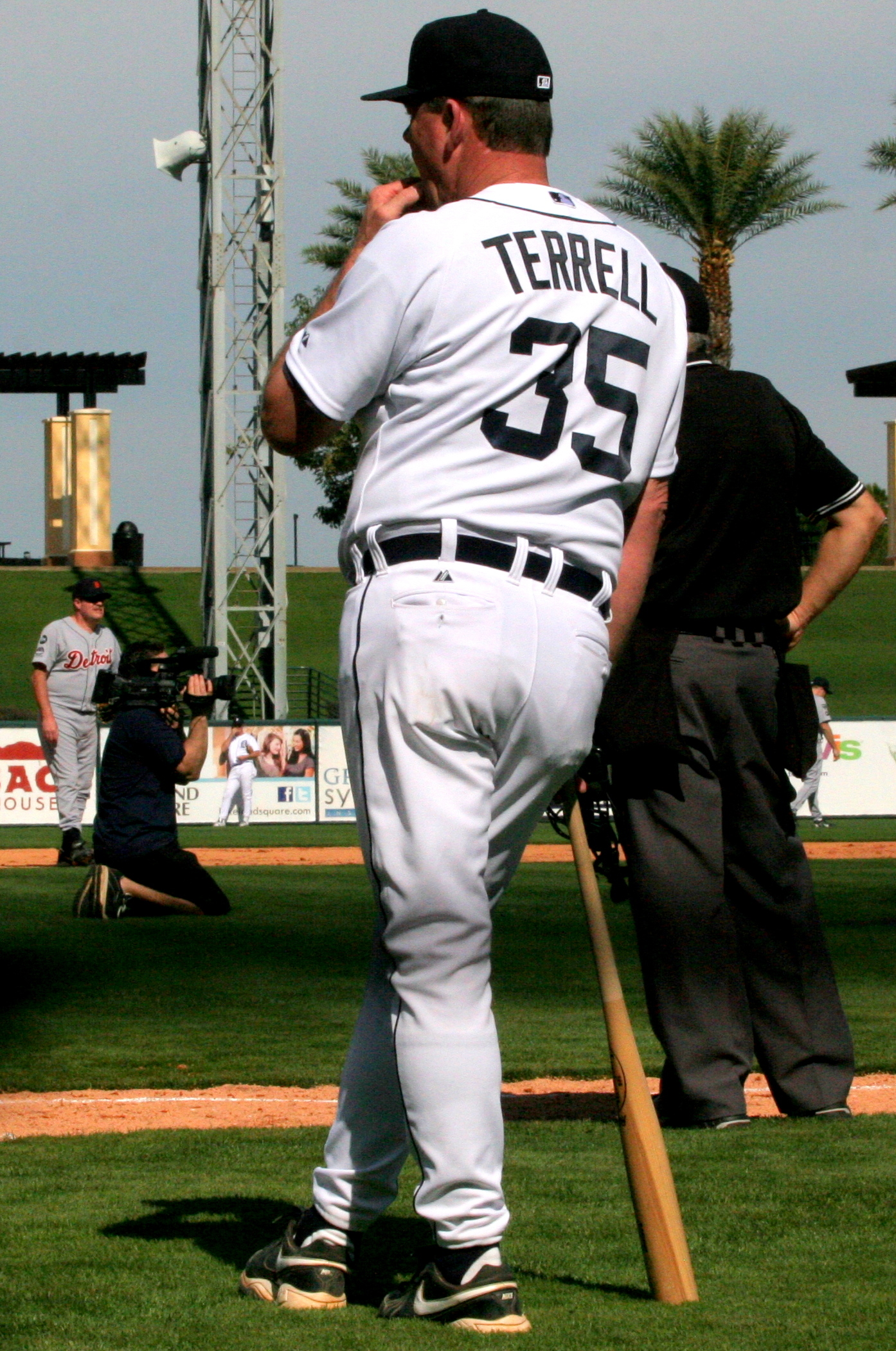
- Terrell at Detroit Tigers Fantasy Camp in 2012
- Pitcher
- Born: May 11, 1958 (age 68); Jeffersonville, Indiana, U.S.
- Batted: Left Threw: Right

MLB debut
- September 18, 1982, for the New York Mets

Last MLB appearance
- October 2, 1992, for the Detroit Tigers

MLB statistics
- Win–loss record: 111–124
- Earned run average: 4.22
- Strikeouts: 929
- Stats at Baseball Reference

Teams
- New York Mets (1982–1984); Detroit Tigers (1985–1988); San Diego Padres (1989); New York Yankees (1989); Pittsburgh Pirates (1990); Detroit Tigers (1990–1992)

Charles Walter Terrell (born May 11, 1958) is an American former Major League Baseball player. A starting pitcher, Terrell pitched from 1982 to 1992 for the New York Mets (1982–1984), Detroit Tigers (1985–1988), San Diego Padres (1989), New York Yankees (1989), Pittsburgh Pirates (1990), and the Tigers again (1990–1992).

== Amateur career ==
In 1979, Terrell played collegiate summer baseball for the Chatham A's of the Cape Cod Baseball League (CCBL). He posted a 9–4 record with a 2.20 ERA and 13 complete games. Terrell set the league record for innings pitched in a season, and was named the league's outstanding pitcher. Terrell was inducted into the CCBL Hall of Fame in 2007.

Terrell attended college at Morehead State University in Morehead, Kentucky. He was initially drafted by the Mets in the 15th round of the 1979 Major League Baseball draft, but did not sign the $12,000 offer, choosing instead to return to Morehead for his senior year. A year later, the Texas Rangers selected him in the 33rd round of the 1980 draft, and this time he did sign, thus beginning his professional career.

== Professional career ==
=== Texas Rangers system ===
Terrell was dominant for the Rangers' Rookie League team in 1980, pitching to a 1.42 ERA, which earned him a promotion to the Rangers' A ball team in Ashville. He hit a wall after the promotion, pitching to a 6.75 ERA, but nonetheless advanced to AA Tulsa the following year. Terrell found his groove that year, finishing 1981 with a 15–7 record and 3.10 ERA, and presumably expected to advance to AAA Denver to begin 1982. In fact, Terrell did begin the 1982 season in AAA, but not with Tulsa.

=== New York Mets ===
On April 1, 1982, just before the start of the 1982 regular season, the Rangers acquired first baseman/outfielder Lee Mazzilli from the Mets, giving up two pitching prospects from their minor league system in order to get him: Terrell and Ron Darling. Met fans were disappointed to lose the popular, homegrown, local star, traded for two minor leaguers whose names most people had never heard. Yet it turned out to be one of the best trades the Mets ever made. The team sent both pitchers to their AAA squad, the Tidewater Tides.

Terrell pitched to a 7–8 record along with a 3.96 ERA at Tidewater, yet was called up to the major league team in September. Pitching for a team which would finish in last place, Terrell overall pitched effectively. His major league debut came against the St. Louis Cardinals, who were on their way to winning that year's World Series. They roughed him up for six runs in six innings, handing him his first major league loss. Despite that inauspicious debut, he averaged seven innings per start in his three major league appearances, all starts, posting an overall ERA of 3.43, albeit while receiving the loss in all three games. His appearances were limited enough for him to qualify as a rookie the following season, 1983.

Terrell began 1983 back in Tidewater, where he showed real promise. He posted a record of 10–1, to go with a 3.12 ERA, and was then recalled to the major leagues. (He went on to be named the International League pitcher of the year.) The Mets had a doubleheader with the Cardinals scheduled for June 20, one of the games a makeup for a rainout two months prior, and called Terrell up to the majors to start the nightcap. He thus made his first 1983 major league appearance against the Cardinals, the same team which had smacked him around in his September 1982 major league debut. This time, however, Terrell got the win, his first as a major leaguer, as the Mets defeated the Cardinals 6–4. Keith Hernandez was now on the Mets' side, his fifth game with his new team after the shocking trade which brought him over to New York from St. Louis five days prior. Hernandez reached base thrice against his old team, including a two run, first inning home run to give the Mets the early lead. Terrell allowed 4 earned runs in 5.2 innings, followed by three relievers who shut the Cardinals out the rest of the way, and Terrell had his first major league victory.

On August 6, 1983, as a rookie facing future Hall of Famer Ferguson Jenkins of the Chicago Cubs, Terrell turned out not only to be the best pitcher that day, but also the best hitter. Entering the game, Terrell had struck out in the majority of his at bats on the season, with eight strikeouts in 14 trips to the plate. He came up to bat in third inning at Wrigley Field, and hit a two-run home run. He came up again in the fourth - and hit another. Jenkins shut down the rest of the Mets' offense, as all four Met RBIs came off of Terrell's bat. Terrell also had the longest start of his major league career to that point, giving up one run in 7.1 innings. Final score - Mets 4, Cubs 1. Later that month, Terrell had another three hits, including a three-run homer. In five seasons as a hitter (the rest of his career was spent in the American League, which employed a designated hitter), he logged only three home runs and ten runs batted in, but all three home runs, as well as seven of the ten RBI, came in a seventeen-day span in August 1983, his rookie year.

Terrell finished the season with an 8–8 record and a 3.57 ERA, a surprising result from a pitcher in what was still considered his rookie year, playing for a team which finished 68–94, in last place.

In 1984, the Mets were involved in their first pennant race in a decade, improving their record by 22 games from the year prior, as they finished in second place behind the Cubs with a 90–72 record. That same year, Terrell established himself as a major league starter. He remained in the big leagues all season, making 33 starts, and finishing with numbers substantially similar to his 1983 results: 11–12 record, 3.52 ERA.

=== Detroit Tigers ===
On December 7, 1984, at the Winter Meetings, Terrell was dealt by the Mets to the Tigers, in exchange for slugging third baseman Howard Johnson. Over the next three years, Terrell established himself as one of the better and more reliable starting pitchers in the American League. He averaged 34 starts per year, finishing with records of 15–10, 15–12, and 17–10 respectively, to go with ERAs of 3.85, 4.56, and 4.05. Although his ERA was higher than it was with the Mets, he was now pitching in a bandbox on the opposite end of the spectrum vs. spacious Shea Stadium, a known pitcher's venue, while facing the designated hitter instead of the opposing pitcher in the lineup, and while often pitching against some of the better lineups in all of baseball in the talented American League East. Terrell was able to withstand the travails of pitching his home games in a hitter's park, relying heavily on his sinker, while benefitting from the excellent defense played by the Tigers' legendary middle infield duo of Alan Trammell and Lou Whitaker.

Against the California Angels on August 20, 1986, Terrell came close to achieving what would have been the remarkable feat of throwing a no-hitter at Tiger Stadium. The score was 0–0 until the Tigers broke through with two outs in the bottom of the 7th inning off of Angels' starter John Candelaria. With two outs in the top of the 9th inning Wally Joyner doubled, ending the no hit bit; Terrell then retired Reggie Jackson on a fly ball to deep centerfield. Terrell got the win and the complete game shutout, having only surrendered one hit and three walks, thus improving his record to 11–9 on the season.

In his next start, on August 25, 1986, Terrell surrendered the first of what would turn out to be 583 home runs by the A's Mark McGwire, as Terrell was the losing pitcher of record in an 8–4 defeat, having been charged with giving up 7 earned runs in just 4.2 innings.

Terrell had a career-best 17 wins during the Tigers 98-win season in which the team captured the 1987 American League Eastern Division title. He experienced his only major league postseason play that year when the Tigers faced off with the Minnesota Twins in 1987 American League Championship Series. The Tigers, with their MLB-leading 98 victories, came in heavily favored over the 85-win Twins, but Detroit faltered badly in series, and lost the best-of-seven in five games. Like his fellow Tiger starting pitchers Jack Morris and Doyle Alexander, Terrell badly underperformed in the playoffs as compared to his regular season accomplishments. Terrell's one start came in Game 3. Handed a 5–0 lead, Terrell gave up six runs to give the lead back to Minnesota, while pitching into the seventh inning, earning him a 6.00 ERA. The Tigers rebounded to win the game, the only victory the team secured that postseason, as the Twins not only bounced Detroit but pulled a similar upset to capture the World Series, defeating the heavily favored St. Louis Cardinals in seven games.

Terrell got off to a bumpy start in 1988. He missed the first few weeks of the season recovering from an injured ankle caused by an offseason fall on the ice. The Tigers were in the thick of the division race that year, trying to defend their AL East crown, before faltering badly late in the season. They had mostly brought back the 1987 team, with the notable exception of Kirk Gibson, who left to the Dodgers via free agency, where he proceeded to win the National League Most Valuable Player award as he led his new team to a surprise championship. The Tigers' team as a whole was stocked with veteran players; age presumably played a factor as they crumbled at the end of the season, as the team suffered through slumps and injuries, losing the division to the Boston Red Sox. Terrell was no exception, as he lost six of his last seven starts. The Tigers and their veteran lineup struggled mightily on offense in 1988, which led to Terrell's finishing with a 7–16 record despite improving his ERA from the prior season, posting a 3.97 mark that year.

=== San Diego Padres ===
Immediately after the 1988 season ended, the Tigers traded Terrell to the San Diego Padres, in exchange for veteran infielders Keith Moreland and Chris Brown.

As a Padre, Terrell made 19 starts, posting a 4.01 ERA. That along with his FIP of 3.85, combined with the best WHIP of his career at 1.297, suggested that bad luck contributed to his unsightly 5–13 record.

=== New York Yankees ===
Terrell's time out west ended on July 22, as he was traded, along with a player to be named later (who became Freddie Toliver), to the Yankees, in exchange for third baseman Mike Pagliarulo and pitcher Don Schulze. Terrell initially struggled with the Yankees, but improved down the stretch, finishing with a 6–5 record and a 5.20 ERA. He became a free agent after the season, and was interested in staying in the Bronx, but those feelings were not reciprocated by the team.

=== Pittsburgh Pirates ===
Terrell's consolation prize was not bad, as he signed a three-year, $3.6 million contract with the Pittsburgh Pirates, an up-and-coming team at that point (as opposed to the sinking ship the Yankees were about to become). The contract was the biggest of Terrell's career. The 1990 Yankees finished in last place, while the Pirates won their division for the first of three consecutive division crowns, 1990–1992, the years covered by his contract. Alas, Terrell was not present for those division winners. Ineffective for Pittsburgh, he did not survive even the first year of those three. Sixteen starts into the season, Terrell had a 2–7 record to go along with an unsightly 5.88 ERA, whereupon the Pirates decided he needed time down at the AAA level. As a veteran, Terrell had the right to refuse the assignment, which he did; the team then placed him on irrevocable waivers. When no other major league team chose to assume his existing contract, the Pirates released him, making him an unrestricted free agent. Under major league rules, Pittsburgh was responsible for the balance of his contract.

=== Detroit Tigers (second stint) ===
Terrell had an obvious landing place at that point - Detroit, where he had found the most success in his career. Under MLB's rules, the Tigers only had to pay him the major league minimum salary during the period of time he remained under contract to Pittsburgh, while the Pirates were on the hook for the rest. The minimum salary at that time was $100,000 per year; the Tigers were responsible for the prorated amount of that $100,000 for the rest of 1990, and the full $100,000 for each of the two years following.

Terrell righted the ship upon returning to Detroit, pitching to a solid if unspectacular 6–4 record and 4.54 ERA over the course of the rest of the season. He made 13 appearances, 12 of them starts. His 1991 output was similar, as he finished with a 10–12 record, while improving his ERA to 4.24. He was again a regular member of the starting rotation, making 33 starts, along with two relief appearances. In 1992, the final year of his Pittsburgh contract, Terrell struggled to repeat his relatively productive work of the prior 1.5 years. After beginning the season as a member of the Tigers' starting rotation, Terrell was mostly used in relief over the last two thirds of the season by manager Sparky Anderson. He started just 14 games, while pitching 22 times out of the bullpen, and posted a record of 7–10 and a 5.20 ERA.

=== Toronto Blue Jays system ===
Terrell became an unrestricted free agent after the season. Unable to attract any major league offers, he signed a minor league contract with the Toronto Blue Jays, hoping to find his way back to the big leagues. Pitching primarily as a starter for Toronto's AAA affiliate in Syracuse, Terrell struggled to a 0–1 record and a 5.30 ERA; by midseason he had seen the handwriting on the wall, and retired.

=== Major league statistics ===
Terrell finished his major league career with a won-loss record of 111–124 and a 4.22 ERA over 321 games, 294 of which were starts. He struck out 929 batters in 1,986.2 innings pitched.

Terrell was a righthanded pitcher but a lefthanded batter. He was a weak hitter, posting a .120 batting average (23-for-192) with 3 home runs and 10 RBI, but was an above average fielding pitcher. He recorded a .980 fielding percentage, with only 10 errors in 489 total chances, and started 38 double plays.

== Personal life ==
Terrell was born in Jeffersonville, Indiana, and attended Morehead State University, where he was a member of the Sigma Alpha Epsilon fraternity. He and his wife, Karen née Forge, have been married since late 1979 or early 1980; their oldest son, Ryan was born in late 1980. Upon retiring from baseball, Terrell and Karen moved to Kentucky, along with their three children, Ryan, Michael, and Erin.
