= Doyle Alexander =

American baseball player (born 1950)

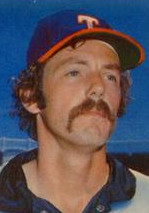
- Pitcher
- Born: September 4, 1950 (age 75); Cordova, Alabama, U.S.
- Batted: Right Threw: Right

MLB debut
- June 26, 1971, for the Los Angeles Dodgers

Last MLB appearance
- September 27, 1989, for the Detroit Tigers

MLB statistics
- Win–loss record: 194–174
- Earned run average: 3.76
- Strikeouts: 1,528
- Stats at Baseball Reference

Teams
- Los Angeles Dodgers (1971); Baltimore Orioles (1972–1976); New York Yankees (1976); Texas Rangers (1977–1979); Atlanta Braves (1980); San Francisco Giants (1981); New York Yankees (1982–1983); Toronto Blue Jays (1983–1986); Atlanta Braves (1986–1987); Detroit Tigers (1987–1989)

Career highlights and awards
- All-Star (1988)

Doyle Lafayette Alexander (born September 4, 1950) is an American former pitcher in Major League Baseball (MLB) who played for the Los Angeles Dodgers, Baltimore Orioles, New York Yankees, Texas Rangers, Atlanta Braves, San Francisco Giants, Toronto Blue Jays, and Detroit Tigers.

== Early life ==
Doyle Lafayette Alexander was born on September 4, 1950, in Cordova, Alabama. Alexander attended Woodlawn High School in Birmingham, Alabama. He later attended Jefferson College in Hillsboro, Missouri.

== Major League career ==
After being drafted by the Dodgers in 1968 in the 9th round, Alexander debuted in the big leagues in 1971 with the team. He was acquired along with Bob O'Brien, Sergio Robles and Royle Stillman by the Baltimore Orioles from the Dodgers for Frank Robinson and Pete Richert at the Winter Meetings on December 2, 1971. He enjoyed his first winning season with the Orioles in 1973 when he went 12–8 with a 3.86 ERA.

Alexander was traded along with Ken Holtzman, Elrod Hendricks, Grant Jackson and Jimmy Freeman from the Orioles to the New York Yankees for Rick Dempsey, Scott McGregor, Tippy Martinez, Rudy May and Dave Pagan at the trade deadline on June 15, 1976. He went 10–5 to help the Yankees win the American League East division. He did not pitch during the American League Championship Series, so he was tapped to start Game 1 of the World Series against the Cincinnati Reds, which he lost.

Alexander took advantage of the advent of free agency by signing with the Texas Rangers on November 23, 1976. He rejected the Yankees over the team's refusal to guarantee him twenty starts a season. He enjoyed one good year before falling apart. He would then join the Atlanta Braves and San Francisco Giants after his stint with Texas. It would not be until he signed with the Toronto Blue Jays during the 1983 season, after being released by the New York Yankees, that he would return to form.

The Blue Jays were on the rise in the mid-1980s, and Alexander was an instrumental part of their success, winning 17 games in both 1984 and 1985, including the division-clinching win over the Yankees in 1985. In the ALCS, however, he went 0–1 with an 8.71 earned run average in two starts as the Blue Jays fell to the Kansas City Royals in seven games. When Alexander negotiated his contract with the Blue Jays, the team refused to pay Alexander if he injured himself while hunting. Toronto lawyer Gord Kirke worked out a compromise in which Alexander would collect money while hurt, "only if he was following all hunting regulations and wearing an orange hunting jacket".

A slow start the next year resulted in Alexander being traded to the Atlanta Braves, who dealt him in turn to the contending Detroit Tigers midway through the 1987 season for a then unknown minor-leaguer named John Smoltz. The Tigers got more than they could have possibly hoped for in Alexander, who went 9–0 with a 1.53 ERA to propel the Tigers to the division title. However, he struggled again in the ALCS, going 0–2 with a 10.00 ERA, bringing his postseason totals to 0–5 with an 8.38 ERA. The following year, Alexander went 14–11 with a 4.32 ERA, earning his only All-Star appearance. In 1989, his performance declined (6–18, 4.44 ERA) in part due to pitching with a fractured jaw. He retired following the season. Although Alexander performed fairly well for the Tigers, the Braves ended up getting the better end of the trade in the long run. Smoltz would go on to pitch twenty years with the Braves and became a Hall of Famer. The trade is now considered one of the most lopsided trades in baseball history. It been cited many times since 1987 as an example of a deal in which each team sought something different and received it. While the Tigers wanted Alexander to bolster them in the short-term, the Braves wanted Smoltz as part of their long-term rebuilding plans.
