= Scott Lusader =

American baseball player (born 1963)

- Outfielder
- Born: September 30, 1963 (age 63); Chicago, Illinois, U.S.
- Batted: Left Threw: Left

MLB debut
- September 1, 1987, for the Detroit Tigers

Last MLB appearance
- May 11, 1991, for the New York Yankees

MLB statistics
- Batting average: .246
- Home runs: 5
- Runs batted in: 36
- Stats at Baseball Reference

Teams
- Detroit Tigers (1987–1990); New York Yankees (1991)

Scott Edward Lusader (born September 30, 1963) is an American former Major League Baseball (MLB) player, who played for the Detroit Tigers from 1987 to 1990, and briefly for the New York Yankees in 1991. Lusader played all three outfield positions in his major league career, but saw the majority of his action as a right fielder.

Lusader was born in Chicago, grew up in Florida and attended Twin Lakes High School in West Palm Beach. He attended the University of Florida, and in 1985, he played collegiate summer baseball with the Falmouth Commodores of the Cape Cod Baseball League. He was selected by the Tigers in the sixth round of the 1985 MLB draft.

As a rookie in 1987, Lusader compiled a .319 batting average in 23 games with a .489 slugging percentage, three doubles, a triple, a home run and eight RBIs. Lusader's average dropped to .063 in 16 games in 1988. In 1989, Lusader had career highs with 103 at bats, 15 runs, 26 hits, and four doubles. In 1990, he played in a career-high 45 games and had 16 RBIs.

On September 9, 1989, Lusader tied a major league record by committing three errors in the outfield in a single inning. Fighting the sun and a soggy turf, Lusader became the eighth major league outfielder to accomplish the feat, the first in the American League since 1925. Lusader dropped a fly ball hit by Carlos Martínez for his first error, then overthrew home plate after a single by Daryl Boston for his second error. For the third error, he allowed the ball to go past him following a single by Ozzie Guillén.

In April 1991, Lusader was placed on waivers by the Tigers, and he was claimed by the New York Yankees for $20,000. He appeared in 11 games for the Yankees in 1991, batted .143, and drove in a single run. He appeared in his last major league game on May 11, 1991.

== See also ==
- List of Florida Gators baseball players
