= Mike Henneman =

American baseball player (born 1961)

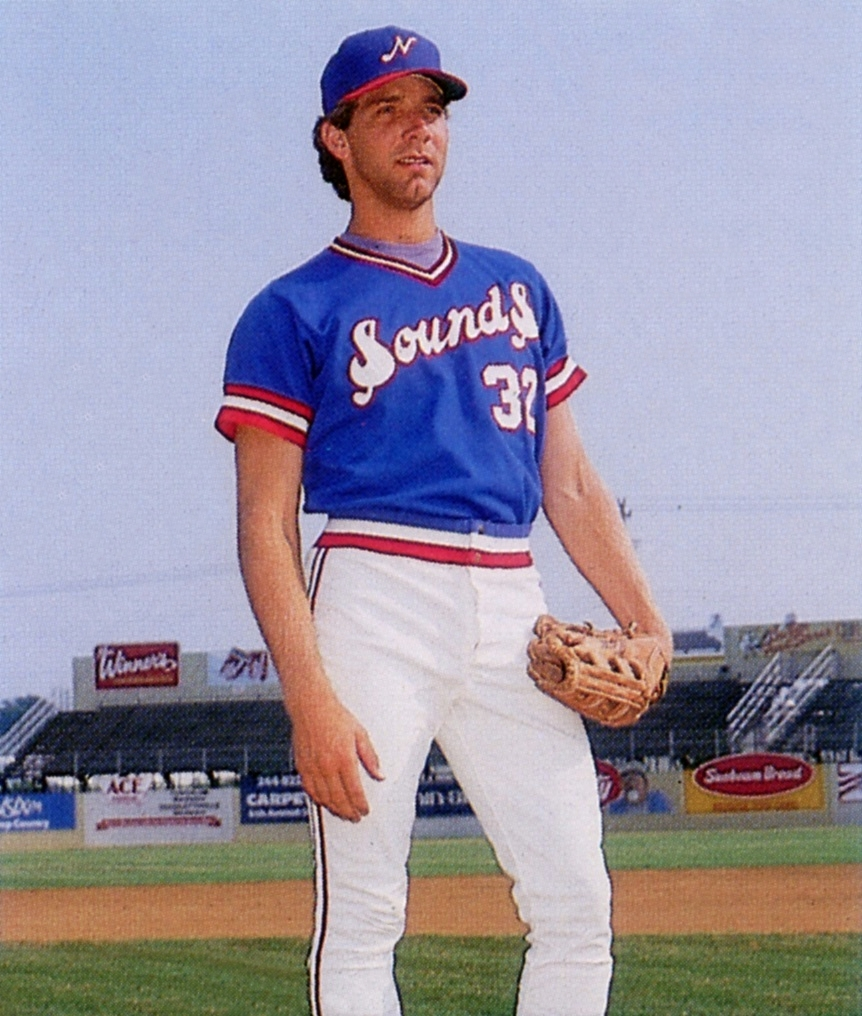
- Henneman with the Nashville Sounds in 1986
- Pitcher
- Born: December 11, 1961 (age 64); St. Charles, Missouri, U.S.
- Batted: Right Threw: Right

MLB debut
- May 11, 1987, for the Detroit Tigers

Last MLB appearance
- September 27, 1996, for the Texas Rangers

MLB statistics
- Win–loss record: 57–42
- Earned run average: 3.21
- Strikeouts: 533
- Saves: 193
- Stats at Baseball Reference

Teams
- Detroit Tigers (1987–1995); Houston Astros (1995); Texas Rangers (1996)

Career highlights and awards
- All-Star (1989)

Michael Alan Henneman (born December 11, 1961) is a former Major League Baseball pitcher with a 10-year career from 1987 to 1996. He played for the Detroit Tigers and Texas Rangers, both of the American League, and the Houston Astros of the National League.

== Amateur career ==
Henneman was born in St. Charles, Missouri, but adopted and raised by a family in Festus, Missouri. He graduated from St. Pius X High School in Crystal City, and attended Jefferson College in nearby Hillsboro in order to play college basketball but worked his way onto the college baseball team after impressing the school's coach in an American Legion baseball game. In 1983, he played collegiate summer baseball with the Wareham Gatemen of the Cape Cod Baseball League.

== Professional career ==
Henneman was named the Sporting News Rookie Pitcher of the Year in 1987, and led Tiger relief pitchers in wins and earned run average in both 1987 and 1988. Henneman was elected to the American League All-Star team in 1989.

Henneman has the second most saves (154) in Tigers history, behind only Todd Jones.

== Coaching career ==
Since retiring from baseball, Henneman has been a coach and roving instructor in the Tigers' minor league system. In 2023, Henneman returned to the Cape Cod Baseball League as the pitching coach for the Chatham Anglers.

== Personal ==
Henneman was adopted as an infant and only found out about five brothers and two sisters after taking a DNA test in 2020.

== See also ==
- Best pitching seasons by a Detroit Tiger
