= Eric King (baseball) =

American baseball player (born 1964)

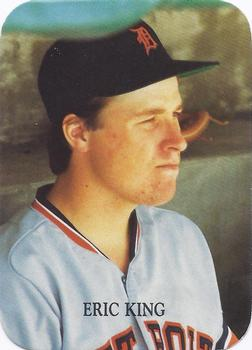
- Pitcher
- Born: April 10, 1964 (age 62); Oxnard, California, U.S.
- Batted: Right Threw: Right

MLB debut
- May 15, 1986, for the Detroit Tigers

Last MLB appearance
- October 4, 1992, for the Detroit Tigers

MLB statistics
- Win–loss record: 52–45
- Earned run average: 3.97
- Strikeouts: 459
- Stats at Baseball Reference

Teams
- Detroit Tigers (1986–1988); Chicago White Sox (1989–1990); Cleveland Indians (1991); Detroit Tigers (1992)

Eric Steven King (born April 10, 1964) is an American former pitcher in Major League Baseball (MLB). He may be best known for giving up Ken Griffey Jr.'s first career Major League home run. King played for three teams during a career that included parts of seven seasons. Those teams are the Detroit Tigers (1986–1988 and 1992), Chicago White Sox (1989–1990) and Cleveland Indians (1991).

== Minor league ==
King attended Moorpark College near Los Angeles, intending to play baseball in 1983, but his attitude butted heads with the coach, and he was dismissed from the team. He left Moorpark and played two seasons in the minor leagues for the San Francisco Giants before being traded to the Detroit Tigers.

== Career ==
On May 15, 1986, King played in his first MLB game. He pitched 5 1/3 scoreless innings of relief against the Texas Rangers, posting three walks and three strikeouts, while surrendering only one hit as the Tigers lost by an 8–1 score. For the season, King appeared in 33 games and 138 1/3 innings. He started 16, but he also finished 9, recording three saves and three complete games, including one shutout. He tallied an 11–4 record and a 3.51 ERA while striking out 79 opponents and walking 63. He was honored that season as the Tigers Rookie of the Year.

King was back with the Tigers in 1987 and he pitched in a career–high 55 games, making only four starts. He saved nine games and finished a total of 26. King's win–loss record was 6–9 and his ERA jumped by a whole run to 4.89. His strikeout total climbed slightly to 89 and he walked 60 in 116 innings.

In 1988, King appeared in only 23 games for Detroit. He won four times and suffered one loss. King threw 68 2/3 innings, the lowest for any season during his MLB career. His ERA improved to 3.41 and with the lower number of innings pitched, his walk and strikeout totals were almost cut in half, as King fanned 45 batters and walked 34. He started five games and saved three.

Prior to the 1989 season, King was acquired by the Chicago White Sox, who sent Kenny Williams to Detroit in exchange. Chicago used King solely as a starter and in 25 starts, King posted a 9–10 record and a 3.39 ERA. He hurled 159 1/3 innings, striking out 72, but walking 64. King also threw a complete-game shutout against the Seattle Mariners on April 22, winning 1–0.

King's second and final season with the White Sox was 1990. He had a 12–4 win–loss record and posted a career–low ERA of 3.28, as he made 25 starts for the second consecutive year. In 151 innings, King's walk total dropped to 40 and he struck 70 opponents. He also hurled a pair of shutouts; against the Kansas City Royals on May 5 and against the Oakland Athletics on June 22. On December 4, 1990, Chicago sent King along with Shawn Hillegas to the Cleveland Indians. The White Sox received Cory Snyder and Lindsay Foster (who never made it to the MLB) in the deal.

In 1991, King played for his third major league team, as he appeared in 25 games for Cleveland, all but one as a starter. His 6–11 record left him with the lowest winning percentage (.353) of his MLB career. King's ERA, which had not been over 3.41 since his second season, jumped all the way to 4.60. Despite this, he threw two complete games and one shutout. King struck out 59 and walked 44 in 150 2/3 innings.

King returned to the Tigers for what would prove to be his final major league season in 1992. In 17 games (14 starts), he was 4–6 with 45 strikeouts, 28 walks, one save and a career-worst 5.22 ERA over 79 1/3 innings.

King went several years without pitching due to arm injuries before attempting a comeback in independent baseball in 1998.
