= Pat Sheridan =

American baseball player (born 1957)

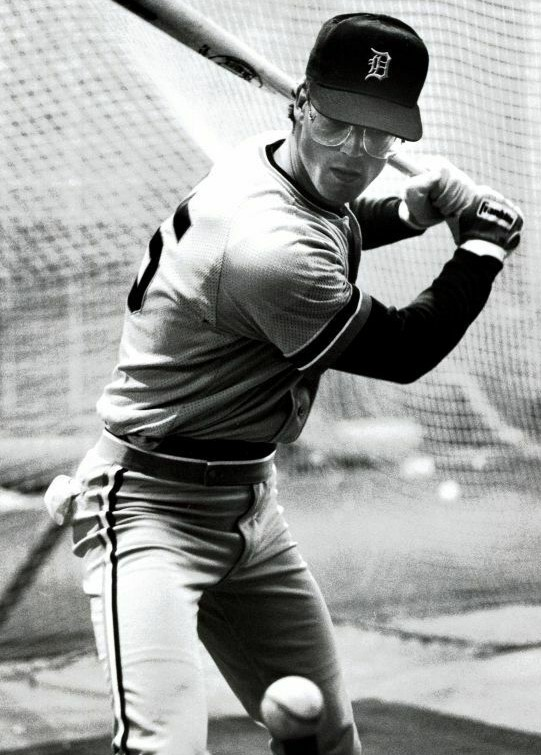
- Outfielder
- Born: December 4, 1957 (age 68); Ann Arbor, Michigan, U.S.
- Batted: Left Threw: Right

MLB debut
- September 16, 1981, for the Kansas City Royals

Last MLB appearance
- October 5, 1991, for the New York Yankees

MLB statistics
- Batting average: .253
- Home runs: 51
- Runs batted in: 257
- Stats at Baseball Reference

Teams
- Kansas City Royals (1981, 1983–1985); Detroit Tigers (1986–1989); San Francisco Giants (1989); New York Yankees (1991)

Career highlights and awards
- World Series champion (1985)

Patrick Arthur Sheridan (born December 4, 1957) is an American former professional baseball player who played in Major League Baseball (MLB) for four different teams, primarily as an outfielder, between 1981 and 1991.

== Biography ==
Sheridan grew up in Wayne, Michigan, and attended Wayne Memorial High School, where he still holds many of the sports records. He played college baseball at Eastern Michigan University. Sheridan was selected to the All Mid-American Conference team as a center fielder in 1979. He was drafted by the Kansas City Royals in the 1979 baseball draft.

In 1983, Sheridan missed two weeks in June with a shoulder injury. Upon his return June 22, he hit a walk-off 12th-inning single to give the Royals a 7-6 victory over the Oakland Athletics.

Sheridan served as the Royals' starting right fielder in 1984. After he and left-fielder Darryl Motley struggled to begin the 1985 season, the Royals acquired Lonnie Smith on May 17 and moved Motley, a right-handed hitter, to right field to platoon with Sheridan, the left-handed hitter. Sheridan hit two home runs for the Royals in the 1985 American League Championship Series against the Toronto Blue Jays, and was a member of the Royals' 1985 World Series champion team that defeated the St. Louis Cardinals in seven games. In 1986, Sheridan battled Motley for the starting right field spot in spring training; this time, the Royals chose to make Motley their everyday right fielder and released Sheridan at the end of spring training on March 28.

On June 16, 1989, he was traded by the Detroit Tigers to the San Francisco Giants for Tracy Jones, and subsequently appeared in the 1989 World Series with the Giants, starting game 3 in right field.

In a 9-year, 876 game major league career, Sheridan compiled a .253 batting average (611-for-2419) with 319 runs, 51 home runs and 257 RBI. He recorded a .983 fielding percentage at all three outfield positions. In 26 postseason games, he hit .174 (12-for-69) with 8 runs, 3 home runs and 6 RBI.
