= Willie Hernández =

Puerto Rican baseball player (1954–2023)

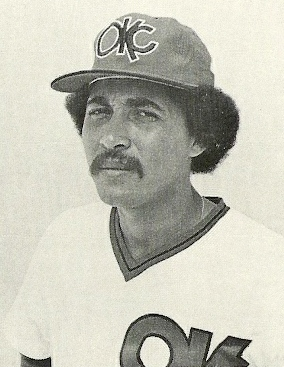
- Hernández in 1976
- Pitcher
- Born: November 14, 1954; Aguada, Puerto Rico
- Died: November 20, 2023 (aged 69); Sebring, Florida, U.S.
- Batted: Left Threw: Left

MLB debut
- April 9, 1977, for the Chicago Cubs

Last MLB appearance
- August 18, 1989, for the Detroit Tigers

MLB statistics
- Win–loss record: 70–63
- Earned run average: 3.38
- Strikeouts: 788
- Saves: 147
- Stats at Baseball Reference

Teams
- Chicago Cubs (1977–1983); Philadelphia Phillies (1983); Detroit Tigers (1984–1989)

Career highlights and awards
- 3× All-Star (1984–1986); World Series champion (1984); AL MVP (1984); AL Cy Young Award (1984)

Guillermo "Willie" Hernández Villanueva (November 14, 1954 – November 20, 2023) was a Puerto Rican professional baseball relief pitcher in Major League Baseball. He won both the American League Cy Young Award and the American League Most Valuable Player Award in 1984 after leading the Detroit Tigers to the World Series championship.

Hernández was born and raised in Aguada, Puerto Rico. He signed with the Philadelphia Phillies in 1973 and played in their minor-league system as a starting pitcher from 1974 to 1976. He was acquired by the Chicago Cubs in the 1976 Rule 5 Draft and played for the Cubs, principally as a relief pitcher, from 1977 to 1983. His performance improved markedly after adding a screwball and cut fastball to his pitching repertoire. He was traded to the Phillies in May 1983, helped lead them to the National League pennant, and appeared in three games in the 1983 World Series, giving up zero hits and zero runs in three games.

In March 1984, he was traded to the Detroit Tigers. As the Tigers' closer in 1984, he compiled a 9–3 win–loss record with 32 saves and a 1.92 earned run average (ERA). He helped lead the Tigers to the 1984 World Series championship and became only the third player in major-league history (following Sandy Koufax and Denny McLain) to win the Cy Young Award, MVP Award, and World Series title, all in the same season.

Hernández continued to pitch for the Tigers through the 1989 season. In 13 major-league seasons, he appeared in 744 games, 733 as a relief pitcher and 11 as a starter, and compiled a win–loss record of 70–63 with a 3.38 ERA, 788 strikeouts, and 147 saves. After his playing career ended, he returned to Puerto Rico, where he operated a construction business and later owned a cattle ranch.

== Early years ==
Hernández was born in 1954 in Aguada, Puerto Rico. He was seventh of eight children born to Dinicio, a worker in a sugar cane factory, and Dominga, a housekeeper. Hernández described them as "a poor, but happy family."

Hernández began playing baseball as a third baseman and outfielder. As a teenager, his manager asked him to pitch when one of the team's pitchers got suspended and another got hurt. Hernández threw a seven-inning shutout. Hernández recalled in 1984 that he thereafter developed a 100-mile-per-hour (160 km/h) fastball and an 85-mile-per-hour (137 km/h) breaking ball, played with the Puerto Rico national team, and won a game against the United States team – the first time the Puerto Rico team had beaten the United States. He also played for a time with the Tiburones de Aguadilla.

== Professional baseball ==
=== Minor leagues ===
Hernández signed with the Philadelphia Phillies as an amateur free agent in 1973. He spent three years in the Phillies' minor-league system, where he was used principally as a starting pitcher. In 1974, he played for the Single-A Spartanburg Phillies in the Western Carolinas League. He appeared in 26 games, all as a starter, and compiled an 11–11 win–loss record with a 2.75 earned run average (ERA), and 13 complete games. He struck out 179 batters in 190 innings pitched.

Hernández was promoted in 1975 to the Double-A Reading Phillies of the Eastern League. Continuing as a starter, he compiled an 8–2 record with a 2.97 ERA. Halfway through the 1975 season, he was promoted again to the Triple-A Toledo Mud Hens of the American Association. He compiled a 6–4 record with a 3.27 ERA at Toledo.

In 1976, Hernández continued as a starting pitcher for the Triple-A Oklahoma City 89ers of the American Association. He appeared in 25 games (23 as a starter) and compiled an 8–9 record with a 4.53 ERA and 88 strikeouts.

=== Chicago Cubs ===
The Chicago Cubs selected Hernández from the Phillies in the 1976 Rule 5 draft. The Cubs converted him into a relief pitcher. He made his major-league debut with the Cubs on April 9, 1977, giving up one hit and no runs in 2 1/3 innings. During his rookie season, he appeared in 67 games (110 innings pitched), all but one as a relief pitcher. He compiled an 8–7 win-loss record with a 3.03 ERA and 78 strikeouts. Hernández made the league minimum salary of $19,000 ($100,947 in current dollar terms) when he joined the Cubs.

In 1978, Hernández appeared in 54 games (59 2/3 innings pitched), all as a relief pitcher. He compiled an 8–2 record with a 3.77 ERA and 38 strikeouts. His ERA jumped to 5.01 in 1979, as he appeared in 51 games, including two games as a starter, and compiled a 4–4 record with zero saves. He played in the shadow of Chicago closer Bruce Sutter during these years.

In 1980, Hernández started seven games but was still used principally as a reliever in 46 games. He compiled a 1–9 record with a 4.40 ERA and 75 strikeouts. In 1981, Hernández pitched only 13 2/3 innings with no wins, no losses, and a 3.95 ERA. The Chicago Tribune described him in these early years as "The Willie Hernandez the Cubs fans love to boo." Hernández recalled that the lack of playing time caused him to lose rhythm, adding: "I was struggling. My attitude was bad."

Hernández emerged as the Cubs' best relief pitcher during the 1982 season. At one point, he went a month without giving up a run. He appeared in 75 games (and an equal 75 innings), a career-high to that point in his career. He was used exclusively in relief, lowered his ERA to 3.00 and tallied 54 strikeouts and 10 saves, the latter being another career high to that point. Fellow relief pitcher Bill Campbell called him "one of the most professional men I've been around" and someone who gives 150% and who "you'll never get an excuse from."

The Chicago Tribune wrote that Hernández came into the 1982 season with "a new personality: confident, aggressive, eager." Hernández gave partial credit to advice he received from Juan Pizarro while pitching in the Puerto Rican Winter League during the off-season. Pizzarro advised Hernández that he was "taking too much time thinking between pitches" and encouraged him to "do your thinking while you're in the bullpen, not in the game." Hernández, who was then making between $90,000 and $100,000, also pointed to his desire to make "big money" and provide for his wife and children: "I'm here to help the ballclub win games and to get a pay raise. I came into the world poor and naked. But I don't want to die with no clothes on."

Hernández began the 1983 season with Chicago, appearing in 11 games, including one start, with a 3.20 ERA. He struck out 18 batters in 19 2/3 innings pitched.

=== Philadelphia Phillies ===
On May 22, 1983, the Cubs traded Hernández to the Philadelphia Phillies in exchange for pitchers Bill Johnson and Dick Ruthven. At the time of the trade, Hernández said: "I'm really excited about coming to a contender like the Phillies, and I'm raring to go. Physically, I feel great, and I'm ready for whatever the Phillies want me to do."

Hernández appeared in 63 games for the Phillies and compiled an 8–4 record with a 3.29 ERA and seven saves. On July 3, he entered a game against the New York Mets in the eighth inning and tied the National League record by striking out six consecutive batters. He was used principally as a setup man for Phillies closer Al Holland.

Hernández also performed well at the plate in 1983. He compiled a .400 batting average, scored two runs, stole a base, and tallied a run batted in. Interviewed late in the season when he was batting .462, he said, "I'm not gonna say I'm a good hitter, but I make contact. I swing the bat. I'm not gonna take three pitches out there."

The Phillies compiled a 90–72 record, defeated the Los Angeles Dodgers to win the National League pennant, and lost to the Baltimore Orioles in the 1983 World Series. Hernández appeared in three games during the World Series, compiling a 0.00 ERA and striking out four batters in four hitless innings pitched. In a frightening moment during the World Series, one of Hernández's pitches hit Baltimore's Dan Ford in the batting helmet in Game Two, causing Ford to fall and remain on the ground for several minutes. It was the first time Hernández had ever hit anybody in the head, and he gave Ford a thumbs-up sign when he got up to let him know, "I didn't mean anything by it. I'm not that kind of pitcher."

=== Detroit Tigers ===
==== Cy Young and MVP in 1984 ====
On March 24, 1984, the Phillies traded Hernández to the Detroit Tigers with Dave Bergman for Glenn Wilson and John Wockenfuss. Upon arriving at the Tigers' spring training facility, Hernández expressed eagerness to help the team in any way he could: "If they want me to come in from the bullpen, I'll do it. If they want me to start, I'll do it. If they want me to DH or steal bases, I'm happy to do it. . . . I'm a winner. I want to play ball in October."

During the 1984 season, Hernández led the American League's pitchers by appearing in 80 games and tallying 68 games finished – both figures establishing new team records for the Tigers. After tallying only 27 saves in the previous seven seasons combined, he ranked third in the league with 32 saves. He also compiled a 9–3 record, a 1.92 ERA, and 112 strikeouts in 140 innings pitched.

By late August, Hernández had entered 39 games with a lead and had successfully protected the lead all 39 times. He had 32 saves in 32 save opportunities through late September. It was not until September 27, after the Tigers had already clinched the AL East, that he failed to capitalize on a save opportunity, allowing a run-scoring sacrifice fly against the New York Yankees. Bill McGraw of the Detroit Free Press described Hernández as "truly the missing link, the key element the Tigers needed to nudge an already good ball club over the thin line separating parvenu from pennant contender." Sports Illustrated credited him with the Tigers' success: "Hernandez has changed the Tigers from a talented team that lost the close ones to a talented team that now steps on an opponent's neck once it gets ahead."

The Tigers finished the season with a 104–58 record, swept the Kansas City Royals in the American League Championship Series, and defeated the San Diego Padres in the 1984 World Series, four games to one. Hernandez pitched five innings in the series, had two saves, and gave up only one run.

After the season, Hernández received the following honors:

- On October 26, he was selected by the Detroit chapter of the Baseball Writers' Association of America for the "Tiger of the Year" award, receiving 42 of 46 votes, ahead of Alan Trammell and Kirk Gibson who received two votes each.
- On October 30, he won the 1984 American League Cy Young Award, beating out Dan Quisenberry by a total of 88 points to 71. He learned of the award at his home in Puerto Rico and said: "This is an incredible award, not only for me, but for all of Puerto Rico. I feel like I won the award for all of the people."
- On November 6, he won the American League Most Valuable Player Award, defeating Kent Hrbek by 306 points to 247.

Hernández was the fourth player in the American League (and the seventh overall) to win the Cy Young and Most Valuable Player awards in the same season. Among that group, only Sandy Koufax and Denny McLain also won a World Series in the same year that they won the Cy Young and MVP awards.

==== Screwball and cutter ====
Many credited the screwball for the turn-around in Hernández's career. Hernández learned the screwball from Mike Cuellar during the off-season in Puerto Rico prior to the 1983 season. Gary Gillette, in his biography of Hernández for the Society for American Baseball Research, wrote that his development of a cutter pitch (or "cut fastball") was the real key to Hernández's success. The cutter looked like a fastball on the inside part of the plate as it approached the plate but then cut in toward the batter's hands, causing right-handed batters to hit weak popups or grounders. Sports Illustrated noted that the contrast between the cutter and the screwball "set up righthanded batters to be jammed (cut fastball) or pitched away (scroogie)."

==== 1985 to 1989 seasons ====
In January 1985, Hernández signed a four-year contract extension with the Tigers. The extension ran through the 1989 season. The four-year extension was worth an estimated $4.65 million and made Hernández the highest paid player in team history. In 1985, Hernández appeared in 70 games and tallied 31 saves with a 2.70 ERA. He was selected to the All-Star team for the second consecutive season and compiled an 8–10 record.

In 1986, Hernández appeared in 64 games and was selected to the All-Star team for the third consecutive year. His ERA jumped to 3.55 and he compiled an 8–7 record with 24 saves in 88 2/3 innings pitched. He compiled a 3–4 record in 1987 with a 3.67 ERA with eight saves in 49 innings pitched.

As Hernández's performance declined, Detroit fans and sports writers were critical of the highly-paid pitcher. After a poor outing in the playoffs in 1987, Mitch Albom of the Detroit Free Press wrote a column titled, "Familiar nightmare: Hernandez on mound", in which he wrote that "Hernandez in crucial situations lately has been about effective for the Tigers as pulling down their pants." The following March, Hernández dumped a bucket of ice water on Albom at spring training in Florida. Albom complained to Tigers' executives who declined to take disciplinary action against Hernández.

One month after dumping ice water on Albom, Hernández asked that the stadium's public address system introduce him by his given name "Guillermo" rather than "Willie" as he had been introduced for the previous four years. The first announcement of his appearance as "Guillermo" led to a "puzzled reaction" from the Tiger Stadium crowd. Questioned about the change after the game, Hernández responded: "I use it because it's my name. What's wrong with using my real name?" He compiled a 6–5 record in 1988 with a 3.06 ERA and 10 saves in 67 innings pitched.

In the spring of 1989, Hernández pitched well and, after a rocky relationship in which he had asked to be traded, expressed a desire to remain in Detroit for the remainder of his career. However, Hernández remained unpopular with fans who booed him on opening day. In the final year of his contract with the Tigers, elbow soreness sidelined Hernández for a portion of the season. He appeared in 32 games, pitched 31 1/3 innings, and compiled a 2–2 record with a career-high 5.74 ERA. At age 34, Hernández appeared in his last major-league game on August 18, 1989, giving up two earned runs in one inning.

=== Comeback attempts ===
In 1990, after undergoing arthroscopic surgery on his left elbow, Hernández attended spring training with the Oakland Athletics. His tryout was cut short in March due to a sore elbow, but he was then tried out again in May.

Hernández attended spring training with the Philadelphia Phillies as a non-roster invitee in 1991. The Phillies released Hernández in early April. He then played with the Triple-A Syracuse Chiefs of the Toronto Blue Jays organization.

Four years later, during the 1994–95 strike, Hernández attempted a comeback with the New York Yankees as a replacement player. He said at the time that the comeback was not about money but because of his love of baseball, adding, "My spirit said I hadn't finished my career yet. I wanted to have more years in my career." In one exhibition game, Hernandez threw six pitches in one inning, retiring three Atlanta Braves batters on two fly balls and a groundout.

== Career statistics ==
Hernández played 13 seasons in Major League Baseball. He appeared in 744 games, 733 as a relief pitcher and 11 as a starter. He compiled a record of 70–63 with a 3.38 ERA, 788 strikeouts, and 147 saves in 1,044-23 innings pitched. At the plate, he posted a .206 batting average (13-for-63) with three runs batted in. Defensively, he was above average, committing only four errors in 231 total chances in 1044.2 innings pitched for a .983 fielding percentage.

Hernández appeared in 10 postseason games (13 2/3 inning pitched) and compiled a postseason ERA of 1.32 with seven strikeouts.

== Later years and family ==
After his playing career ended, Hernández owned and operated a steel construction business in Puerto Rico. He later sold his construction business and operated a cattle ranch.

Hernández married Carmen Rivera in 1978. They had two sons together, Guillermo, born in approximately 1981 and Xavier, born in approximately 1982.

Hernández's health declined in the years following his playing days. He developed asthma and diabetes and had multiple strokes. He had heart surgery in 2009.

On April 4, 2019, Hernández returned to Detroit to throw the ceremonial first pitch at the Tigers 2019 home opener.

Hernández died at home in Sebring, Florida, on November 20, 2023, at age 69. He was buried at Monte Cristo Memorial Park in Aguadilla, Puerto Rico.

== See also ==
- List of Major League Baseball players from Puerto Rico
