= Jim Morrison (baseball) =

American baseball player and manager (born 1952)

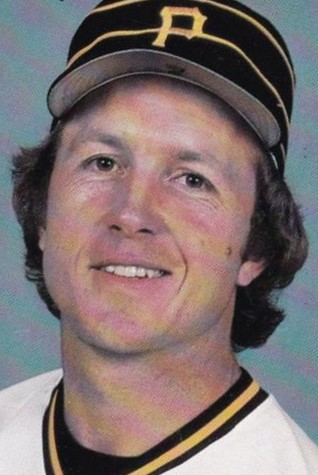
- Morrison with the Pittsburgh Pirates
- Third baseman / Second baseman
- Born: September 23, 1952 (age 73); Pensacola, Florida, U.S.
- Batted: Right Threw: Right

MLB debut
- September 18, 1977, for the Philadelphia Phillies

Last MLB appearance
- September 28, 1988, for the Atlanta Braves

MLB statistics
- Batting average: .260
- Home runs: 112
- Runs batted in: 435
- Stats at Baseball Reference

Teams
- Philadelphia Phillies (1977–1978); Chicago White Sox (1979–1982); Pittsburgh Pirates (1982–1987); Detroit Tigers (1987–1988); Atlanta Braves (1988)

James Forrest Morrison (born September 23, 1952) is an American former professional baseball second baseman and third baseman who played in Major League Baseball (MLB) from 1977 to 1988 for the Philadelphia Phillies, Chicago White Sox, Pittsburgh Pirates, Detroit Tigers, and Atlanta Braves. He also spent time playing in the Italian Baseball League.

After his playing career, Morrison became a manager in Minor League Baseball. He managed the Columbus Catfish, a Class A affiliate of the Tampa Bay Rays, leading them to the South Atlantic League championship in 2007. He later managed the Charlotte Stone Crabs until 2012, and as of 2016 was named manager of the Florida Complex League Rays.

== Career statistics ==
In 12 MLB seasons covering 1,089 games, Morrison compiled a .260 batting average with 371 runs, 112 home runs, and 435 runs batted in. He recorded a .963 fielding percentage across second and third base.
