= Detroit Tigers award winners and league leaders =

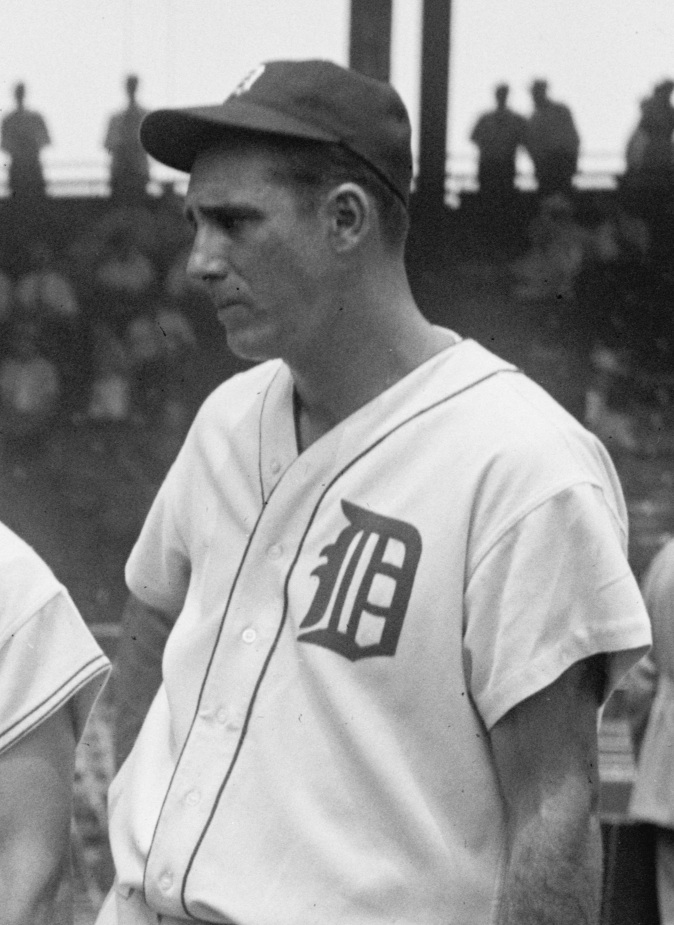
Hank Greenberg, Hall of Famer and 2-time MVP

This is a list of award winners and league leaders for the Detroit Tigers professional baseball team.

== Awards and achievements ==
=== American League Most Valuable Player Award (12) ===
- 1911 – Ty Cobb
- 1934 – Mickey Cochrane
- 1935 – Hank Greenberg
- 1937 – Charlie Gehringer
- 1940 – Hank Greenberg
- 1944 – Hal Newhouser
- 1945 – Hal Newhouser
- 1968 – Denny McLain
- 1984 – Willie Hernández
- 2011 – Justin Verlander
- 2012 – Miguel Cabrera
- 2013 – Miguel Cabrera

=== American League Cy Young Award (7) ===
- 1968 – Denny McLain
- 1969 – Denny McLain
- 1984 – Willie Hernández
- 2011 – Justin Verlander
- 2013 – Max Scherzer
- 2024 – Tarik Skubal
- 2025 – Tarik Skubal

=== American League Triple Crown (5) ===
- 1909 – Ty Cobb, batting
- 1945 – Hal Newhouser, pitching
- 2011 – Justin Verlander, pitching
- 2012 – Miguel Cabrera, batting
- 2024 – Tarik Skubal, pitching

=== American League Rookie of the Year award (6) ===
- 1953 – Harvey Kuenn
- 1976 – Mark Fidrych
- 1978 – Lou Whitaker
- 2006 – Justin Verlander
- 2016 – Michael Fulmer
- 2026 – Kevin McGonigle

=== American League Manager of the Year (3) ===
See footnote

- 1984 – Sparky Anderson
- 1987 – Sparky Anderson
- 2006 – Jim Leyland

=== Fielding Bible Award (3) ===
- Center field
  - 2011 – Austin Jackson

- Second base
  - 2015 – Ian Kinsler

• Left field

• 2024 – Riley Greene

=== Gold Glove Award (45) ===
Key
†	Elected to the Baseball Hall of Fame

Player	Position	Times Won	Years
Frank Bolling	2B	1	1958
Ed Brinkman	SS	1	1972
Yoenis Céspedes	OF	1	2015
Dillon Dingler	C	2	2025–2026
Bill Freehan	C	5	1965–1969
Al Kaline^{†}	OF	10	1957–1959, 1961–1967
Ian Kinsler	2B	1	2016
Frank Lary	P	1	1961
Lance Parrish	C	3	1983–1985
Gary Pettis	OF	2	1988, 1989
Plácido Polanco	2B	2	2007, 2009
Aurelio Rodríguez	3B	1	1976
Iván Rodríguez^{†}	C	3	2004, 2006, 2007
Kenny Rogers	P	1	2006
Mickey Stanley	OF	4	1968–1970, 1973
Alan Trammell^{†}	SS	4	1980, 1981, 1983, 1984
Lou Whitaker	2B	3	1983–1985

=== Silver Slugger Award (38) ===
Key
†	Elected to the Baseball Hall of Fame

Player	Position	Times Won	Years
Alex Avila	C	1	2011
Miguel Cabrera	1B, 3B	5	2010, 2012, 2013, 2015, 2016
Dillon Dingler	C	1	2026
Damion Easley	2B	1	1998
Cecil Fielder	1B	2	1990, 1991
Prince Fielder	1B	1	2012
Travis Fryman	SS	1	1992
Riley Greene	OF	2	2025, 2026
Torii Hunter	OF	1	2013
J. D. Martinez	OF	1	2015
Víctor Martínez	DH	1	2014
Kevin McGonigle	UT	1	2026
Zach McKinstry	UT	1	2025
Matt Nokes	C	1	1987
Magglio Ordóñez	OF	1	2007
Dean Palmer	3B	1	1999
Lance Parrish	C	5	1980, 1982–1984, 1986
Plácido Polanco	2B	1	2007
Iván Rodríguez^{†}	C	1	2004
Mickey Tettleton	C	2	1991, 1992
Alan Trammell^{†}	SS	3	1987, 1988, 1990
Lou Whitaker	2B	4	1983–1985, 1987

=== All-MLB Team (3) ===
Key
†	Elected to the Baseball Hall of Fame

Player	Position	Times Won	Years
Tarik Skubal	SP	3	2024 (1st), 2025 (1st), 2026 (2nd)

=== Edgar Martínez Award ===
- 1975 – Willie Horton
- 1978 – Rusty Staub
- 2014 – Víctor Martínez

=== Wilson Defensive Player of the Year Award (3) ===
Team (at all positions)

- 2012 – Austin Jackson
- 2013 – Austin Jackson

Second base (in MLB)

- 2014 – Ian Kinsler

=== American League Championship Series MVP Award (3) ===
- 1984 – Kirk Gibson
- 2006 – Plácido Polanco
- 2012 – Delmon Young

=== World Series MVP Award (2) ===
- 1968 – Mickey Lolich
- 1984 – Alan Trammell

=== MLB "This Year in Baseball Awards" ===
See: This Year in Baseball Awards#Award winners
Note: Voted by fans as the best in all of Major League Baseball (i.e., not two awards, one for each league).

==== "This Year in Baseball Awards" MLB MVP ====
- 2012 – Miguel Cabrera
- 2013 – Miguel Cabrera

==== "This Year in Baseball Awards" Defensive Player of the Year ====
- 2007 – Plácido Polanco

==== "This Year in Baseball Awards" Play of the Year ====
- 2007 – Curtis Granderson

==== "This Year in Baseball Awards" Performance of the Year ====
- 2010 – Armando Galarraga

==== "Greatness in Baseball Yearly (GIBBY)" Starting Pitcher ====
- 2011 – Justin Verlander

==== "Greatness in Baseball Yearly (GIBBY)" Closer ====
- 2011 – José Valverde

=== Players Choice Awards ===
==== Player of the Year ====
- 2011 – Justin Verlander
- 2012 – Miguel Cabrera
- 2013 – Miguel Cabrera (2)

==== Marvin Miller Man of the Year Award ====
- 2009 – Curtis Granderson
- 2010 – Brandon Inge

==== Outstanding Player ====
- 2012 – Miguel Cabrera
- 2013 – Miguel Cabrera (2)

==== Outstanding Pitcher ====
- 2011 – Justin Verlander
- 2013 – Max Scherzer

==== Outstanding Rookie ====
- 2006 – Justin Verlander
- 2010 – Austin Jackson
- 2016 – Michael Fulmer

=== MLB All-Century Team (1999) ===
See: Major League Baseball All-Century Team

- Ty Cobb (1 of 10 outfielders)

=== MLB All-Time Team (BBWAA) (1997) ===
See: Major League Baseball All-Time Team

- Ty Cobb (CF; runner-up)

=== DHL Hometown Heroes (2006) ===
- Ty Cobb — voted by MLB fans as the most outstanding player in the history of the franchise, based on on-field performance, leadership quality and character value

=== USA Today AL MVP ===
- 2011 – Miguel Cabrera

=== USA Today AL Top Pitcher ===
- 2011 – Justin Verlander

=== American League Rolaids Relief Man Award ===
See footnote

- 2000 – Todd Jones
- 2011 – José Valverde

=== Sporting News AL Reliever of the Year Award ===
See footnote

==== The Sporting News AL Fireman of the Year Award (1960–2000; for closers) ====
- 1973 – John Hiller
- 2000 – Todd Jones

=== Sporting News AL Rookie of the Year Award ===
- 2016 – Michael Fulmer

=== Topps All-Star Rookie teams ===
- 1961 – Jake Wood (2B)
- 1970 – Les Cain (LHP)
- 1975 – Tom Veryzer (SS)
- 1976 – Jason Thompson (1B) & Mark Fidrych (RHP)
- 1977 – Dave Rozema (RHP)
- 1980 – Rick Peters (OF)
- 1987 – Matt Nokes (C)
- 1988 – Paul Gibson (LHP)
- 1991 – Milt Cuyler (OF) & Mark Leiter (LHP)
- 1992 – Scott Livingstone (3B)
- 1994 – Chris Gomez (SS)
- 1996 – Tony Clark (1B)
- 2002 – Ramon Santiago (SS)
- 2006 – Justin Verlander (RHP)
- 2010 – Austin Jackson (OF)
- 2013 – José Iglesias (SS)

=== Sporting News American League Comeback Player of the Year ===
- 1965 – Norm Cash
- 1971 – Norm Cash
- 1973 – John Hiller
- 1983 – Alan Trammell

=== Hutch Award ===
- 1969 – Al Kaline
- 1973 – John Hiller

=== Ford C. Frick Award (broadcasters) ===
- 1981 – Ernie Harwell

=== BBWAA Career Excellence Award (baseball writers) ===
- 1968 – H. G. Salsinger
- 2001 – Joe Falls
- 2015 – Tom Gage
- 2022 – John Lowe

== Team award ==
- 1907 – American League pennant
- 1908 – American League pennant
- 1909 – American League pennant
- 1934 – American League pennant
- 1935 – American League pennant
- 1935 – World Series championship
- 1940 – American League pennant
- 1945 – American League pennant
- 1945 – World Series championship
- 1968 – American League pennant
- 1968 – World Series Trophy
- 1984 – William Harridge Trophy (American League champion)
- 1984 – World Series Trophy
- 1997 – Baseball America Organization of the Year
- 2006 – William Harridge Trophy (American League champion)
- 2012 – William Harridge Trophy (American League champion)
- 2013 – Commissioner's Award for Philanthropic Excellence

== Minor-league system ==
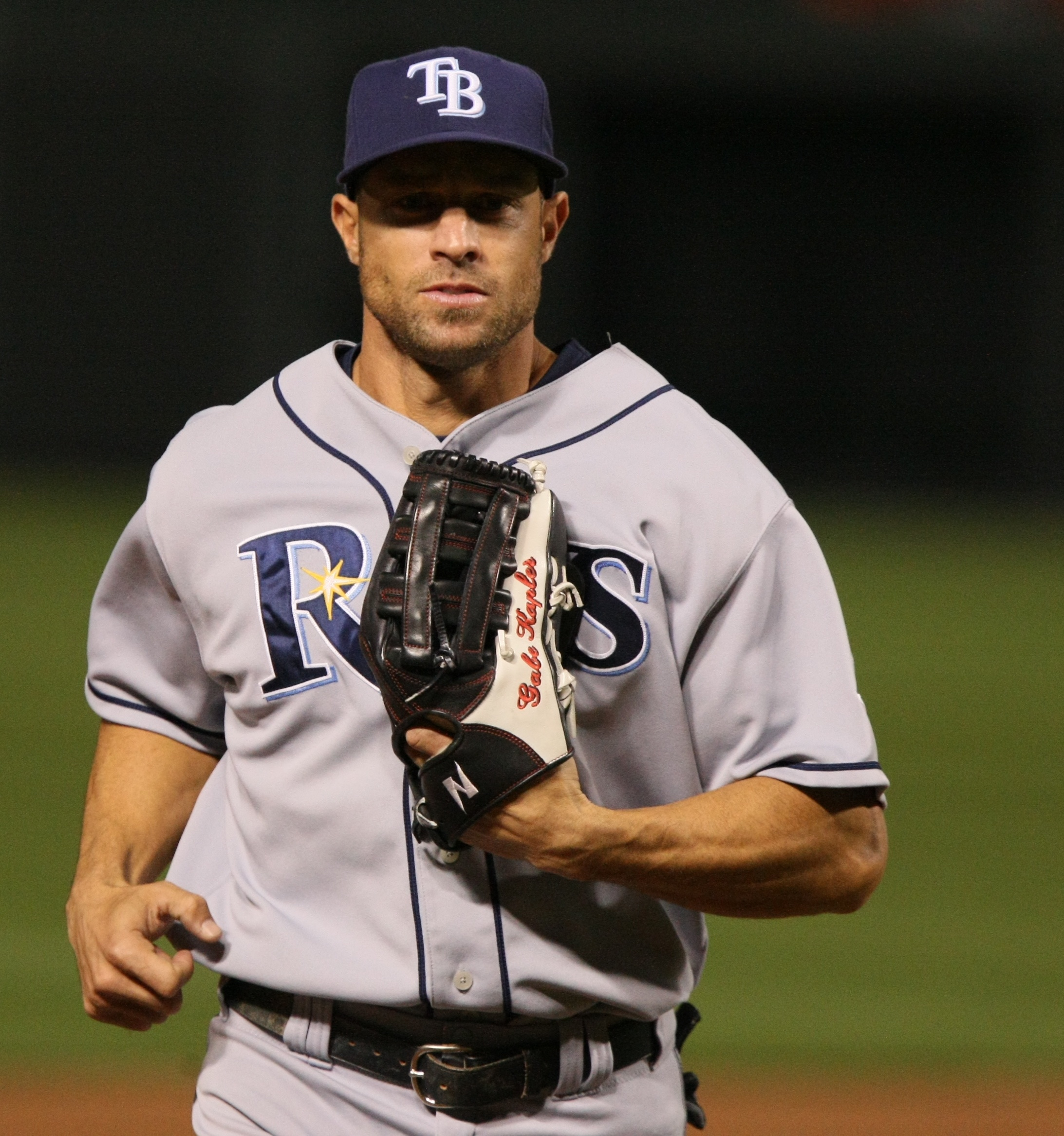
Gabe Kapler

=== USA Today Minor League Player of the Year Award ===
- 1998 – Gabe Kapler (OF)

== Other achievements ==
=== National Baseball Hall of Fame ===
See: Detroit Tigers#Baseball Hall of Famers

=== Retired numbers ===
See: Detroit Tigers#Retired numbers and honorees

=== Tiger of the Year ===
The following players were selected as "Tiger of the Year" by the Detroit chapter of the Baseball Writers' Association of America.

- 2024 – Tarik Skubal: AL Cy Young Award; Triple Crown winner; 18 wins; 2.39 ERA; 228 strikeouts; 5.9 fWAR
- 2023 – Spencer Torkelson: .233 batting average; 34 doubles; 31 home runs; 94 RBIs; .759 OPS
- 2022 – Riley Greene: .253 batting average; 18 doubles; 5 home runs; 52 RBIs; .707 OPS
- 2021 – Jeimer Candelario: .271 batting average; 42 doubles (T-1st in MLB); 16 home runs; 67 RBIs; .795 OPS
- 2020 – Jeimer Candelario: .297 batting average; 3 triples (T-2nd in AL); 7 home runs; 29 RBIs; .872 OPS
- 2019 – Matthew Boyd: 9-12 record; 4.56 ERA; 238 strikeouts (6th in AL); 7.46 K/BB ratio (4th in AL); 1.23 WHIP (9th in AL)
- 2018 - Nicholas Castellanos: .298 batting average; 23 home runs; 46 doubles; 89 RBIs; .854 OPS; .500 slugging
- 2017 – Justin Upton: .279 batting average; 28 home runs; 37 doubles; 94 RBIs; .904 OPS; .542 slugging
- 2016 – Justin Verlander: 16–9 record; 3.04 ERA (2nd in AL); Led AL with 254 strikeouts and 1.00 WHIP; 6.61 WAR (1st in AL among pitchers)
- 2015 – J. D. Martinez: .282 batting average; 33 doubles; 38 home runs (8th in AL); 102 RBIs (7th in AL); .879 OPS (9th in AL); .993 fielding percentage; 15 outfield assists (2nd in AL)
- 2014 – Víctor Martínez: .335 batting average (2nd in AL); 103 RBIs; .409 on-base percentage (1st in AL); .974 OPS (1st in MLB)
- 2013 – Miguel Cabrera: AL MVP; .348 batting average (1st in MLB); 44 home runs (2nd in MLB); 137 RBIs (2nd in MLB)
- 2012 – Miguel Cabrera: AL MVP; Triple Crown winner; .330 batting average (1st in MLB); 44 home runs (1st in MLB); 139 RBIs (1st in MLB)
- 2011 – Justin Verlander: AL MVP and Cy Young Awards; Triple Crown winner; 24–5 record; 2.40 ERA
- 2010 – Miguel Cabrera: .328 batting average; 38 home runs; 45 doubles; 126 RBIs; .622 slugging
- 2009 – Justin Verlander: 19–9 record; 3.45 ERA; Led AL with 35 games started, 240.0 innings pitched, 269 strikeouts and 10.1 strikeouts per nine innings.
- 2008 – Miguel Cabrera: .292 batting average; 37 home runs (1st in AL); 36 doubles; 127 RBIs (3rd in AL); .537 slugging (7th in AL)
- 2007 – Magglio Ordóñez: .363 average (led Major League Baseball); 54 doubles (led MLB); 139 RBIs (2nd in American League), .434 on base (2nd in AL), .595 slugging (4th in AL)
- 2006 – Carlos Guillén: .320 average; .400 on base; .519 slugging; 41 doubles; 100 runs; No. 10 in AL MVP voting
- 2005 – Plácido Polanco: 338 average and .461 slugging in 86 games
- 2004 – Iván Rodríguez: Gold Glove at catcher; .334 average; .510 slugging; 33 doubles; No. 10 in AL MVP voting
- 2003 – Dmitri Young: 29 home runs; .297 average; .372 on base; .537 slugging
- 2002 – Randall Simon: 19 home runs; .301 average
- 2001 – Steve Sparks: Led AL in complete games (8)
- 2000 – Bobby Higginson: .300 average; .538 slugging; 40 doubles; 30 home runs; 102 RBIs; 104 runs; 19 OF assists
- 1999 – Dean Palmer: 38 home runs; 100 RBIs; .518 slugging
- 1998 – Damion Easley: 38 doubles; 27 home runs; 100 RBIs
- 1997 – Tony Clark: 32 home runs; 117 RBIs; 105 runs; .500 slugging
- 1997 – Bobby Higginson: .299 average; .379 on base; .520 slugging; 27 home runs; 20 OF assists
- 1996 – Travis Fryman: 22 home runs; 100 RBIs
- 1995 – Travis Fryman: .275 average; 81 RBIs
- 1994 – Kirk Gibson: 23 home runs; .548 slugging
- 1993 – Tony Phillips: .313 average; .443 on base; 113 runs
- 1992 – Cecil Fielder: 35 home runs; 124 RBIs; No. 9 in AL MVP voting
- 1991 – Cecil Fielder: 44 home runs: 133 RBIs; 102 runs; No. 2 in AL MVP voting
- 1990 – Cecil Fielder: 51 home runs; 132 RBIs; 104 runs; .592 slugging; No. 2 in AL MVP voting
- 1989 – Lou Whitaker: 28 home runs; .361 on base pct; .462 slugging
- 1988 – Alan Trammell: .311 average; No. 7 in AL MVP voting
- 1987 – Alan Trammell: .343 average; .402 on base; .551 slugging; 28 home runs; 105 RBIs; No. 2 in AL MVP voting
- 1986 – Jack Morris: 21–8 record; .724 win percentage; No. 5 in AL Cy Young voting
- 1985 – Darrell Evans: AL HR leader at age 38 with 40 HRs; .518 slugging; No. 14 in AL MVP voting
- 1984 – Willie Hernández: AL MVP and Cy Young Awards; 1.92 ERA; 68 games finished
- 1983 – Lou Whitaker: Gold Glove at 2nd base; .320 average; 205 hits; No. 8 in AL MVP voting
- 1982 – Lance Parrish: 32 home runs; .529 slugging; No. 13 in AL MVP voting
- 1981 – Kirk Gibson: .328 average; No. 12 in AL MVP voting
- 1980 – Alan Trammell: Gold Glove at shortstop; .300 average; .376 on base pct.
- 1979 – Steve Kemp: 318 average; .543 slugging; 26 home runs; 105 RBIs
- 1978 – Ron LeFlore: Led AL in stolen bases (68) and runs (126)
- 1977 – Ron LeFlore: .325 average; 212 hits; 100 runs
- 1976 – Mark Fidrych: Year of the Bird; 19 wins; 2.34 ERA; Rookie of the Year Award; No. 2 in AL Cy Young voting
- 1975 – Willie Horton: 25 home runs; 92 RBIs
- 1974 – Al Kaline: Kaline's final season; 3,000th hit
- 1973 – John Hiller: 1.44 ERA; 65 games; No. 4 in AL MVP voting; AL Hutch Award
- 1972 – Ed Brinkman: Gold Glove award at shortstop; .990 fielding percentage; No. 9 in AL MVP and CY Young voting
- 1971 – Mickey Lolich: Led AL in wins (25) and strikeouts (308); No. 2 in Cy Young voting; No. 5 in AL MVP voting
- 1970 – Tom Timmermann: 61 games; 43 games finished; 27 saves
- 1969 – Denny McLain: 24 wins; 2.80 ERA; .727 win percentage
- 1968 – Denny McLain: 31 wins; 1.96 ERA; .280 strikeouts; 838 win pct.; Cy Young and AL MVP awards
- 1967 – Bill Freehan: Gold Glove award at catcher; .389 on-base percentage; No. 3 in AL MVP voting
- 1966 – Denny McLain: 20 wins; .727 win percentage; No. 15 in AL MVP voting
- 1965 – Don Wert: .341 on-base percentage; 331 assists at third base; No. 10 in AL MVP voting

=== King Tiger Award ===
See: King Tiger Award

=== Sporting News Sportsman of the Year ===
See: Sporting News#Sportsman of the Year

- 1968 – Denny McLain

== American League statistical batting leaders ==
=== Batting average (27) ===
  - 1907 – Ty Cobb, .350
  - 1908 – Ty Cobb, .324
  - 1909 – Ty Cobb, .377
  - 1911 – Ty Cobb, .420
  - 1912 – Ty Cobb, .409
  - 1913 – Ty Cobb, .390
  - 1914 – Ty Cobb, .368
  - 1915 – Ty Cobb, .369
  - 1917 – Ty Cobb, .383
  - 1918 – Ty Cobb, .382
  - 1919 – Ty Cobb, .384
  - 1921 – Harry Heilmann, .394
  - 1923 – Harry Heilmann, .403
  - 1925 – Harry Heilmann, .393
  - 1926 – Heinie Manush, .378
  - 1927 – Harry Heilmann, .398
  - 1932 – Dale Alexander, .367
  - 1937 – Charlie Gehringer, .371
  - 1949 – George Kell, .343
  - 1955 – Al Kaline, .340
  - 1959 – Harvey Kuenn, .353
  - 1961 – Norm Cash, .361
  - 2007 – Magglio Ordóñez, .363
  - 2011 – Miguel Cabrera, .344
  - 2012 – Miguel Cabrera, .340
  - 2013 – Miguel Cabrera, .348
  - 2015 – Miguel Cabrera, .338

=== On-base percentage (15) ===
  - 1903 – Jimmy Barrett, .407
  - 1909 – Ty Cobb, .431
  - 1910 – Ty Cobb, .456
  - 1913 – Ty Cobb, .467
  - 1914 – Ty Cobb, .466
  - 1915 – Ty Cobb, .486
  - 1917 – Ty Cobb, .444
  - 1918 – Ty Cobb, .440
  - 1959 – Eddie Yost, .435
  - 1960 – Eddie Yost, .414
  - 1961 – Norm Cash, .487
  - 2010 – Miguel Cabrera, .420
  - 2011 – Miguel Cabrera, .448
  - 2013 – Miguel Cabrera, .442
  - 2014 – Víctor Martínez, .409

=== Slugging percentage (14) ===
  - 1907 – Ty Cobb, .468
  - 1908 – Ty Cobb, .475
  - 1909 – Ty Cobb, .517
  - 1910 – Ty Cobb, .551
  - 1911 – Ty Cobb, .621
  - 1912 – Ty Cobb, .584
  - 1914 – Ty Cobb, .513
  - 1917 – Ty Cobb, .570
  - 1940 – Hank Greenberg, .670
  - 1943 – Rudy York, .527
  - 1959 – Al Kaline, .530
  - 1990 – Cecil Fielder, .592
  - 2012 – Miguel Cabrera, .606
  - 2013 – Miguel Cabrera, .636

=== On-base plus slugging (OPS) (16) ===
  - 1907 – Ty Cobb, .848
  - 1908 – Ty Cobb, .842
  - 1909 – Ty Cobb, .947
  - 1910 – Ty Cobb, 1.008
  - 1911 – Ty Cobb, 1.088
  - 1912 – Ty Cobb, 1.040
  - 1914 – Ty Cobb, .979
  - 1915 – Ty Cobb, .973
  - 1917 – Ty Cobb, 1.014
  - 1925 – Ty Cobb, 1.066
  - 1940 – Hank Greenberg, 1.103
  - 1959 – Al Kaline, .940
  - 1961 – Norm Cash, 1.148
  - 2012 – Miguel Cabrera, .999
  - 2013 – Miguel Cabrera, 1.078
  - 2014 – Víctor Martínez, .974

=== Games played (40) ===
  - 1904 – Jimmy Barrett, 162
  - 1909 – Donie Bush, 157
  - 1920 – Bobby Veach, 154
  - 1922 – Topper Rigney, 155
  - 1922 – Bobby Veach, 155
  - 1926 – Jackie Tavener, 156
  - 1929 – Dale Alexander, 155
  - 1930 – Charlie Gehringer, 155
  - 1930 – Dale Alexander, 154
  - 1930 – Charlie Gehringer, 154
  - 1933 – Charlie Gehringer, 155
  - 1933 – Billy Rogell, 155
  - 1934 – Charlie Gehringer, 154
  - 1934 – Marv Owen, 154
  - 1934 – Billy Rogell, 154
  - 1940 – Rudy York, 155
  - 1943 – Dick Wakefield, 155
  - 1943 – Rudy York, 155
  - 1945 – Rudy York, 155
  - 1946 – Eddie Lake, 155
  - 1947 – Eddie Lake, 158
  - 1949 – Vic Wertz, 155
  - 1950 – Johnny Groth, 157
  - 1950 – George Kell, 157
  - 1950 – Jerry Priddy, 157
  - 1951 – Jerry Priddy, 154
  - 1954 – Harvey Kuenn, 155
  - 1955 – Bill Tuttle, 154
  - 1961 – Rocky Colavito, 163
  - 1965 – Don Wert, 162
  - 1972 – Ed Brinkman, 162
  - 1973 – Ed Brinkman, 162
  - 1976 – Rusty Staub, 161
  - 1981 – Lou Whitaker, 109
  - 1991 – Cecil Fielder, 162
  - 1997 – Brian Hunter, 162
  - 2009 – Brandon Inge, 161
  - 2011 – Miguel Cabrera, 161
  - 2012 – Prince Fielder, 162
  - 2013 – Prince Fielder, 162

=== At bats (12) ===
  - 1908 – Sam Crawford, 591
  - 1913 – Sam Crawford, 609
  - 1917 – Ty Cobb, 588
  - 1929 – Roy Johnson, 640
  - 1942 – Doc Cramer, 630
  - 1943 – Dick Wakefield, 633
  - 1950 – George Kell, 641
  - 1953 – Harvey Kuenn, 679
  - 1954 – Harvey Kuenn, 656
  - 1992 – Travis Fryman, 659
  - 1994 – Travis Fryman, 464
  - 2014 – Ian Kinsler, 684

=== Plate appearances (17) ===
  - 1904 – Jimmy Barrett, 714
  - 1908 – Matty McIntyre, 672
  - 1909 – Donie Bush, 676
  - 1913 – Donie Bush, 694
  - 1914 – Donie Bush, 721
  - 1915 – Donie Bush, 703
  - 1918 – Donie Bush, 594
  - 1922 – Bobby Veach, 705
  - 1929 – Charlie Gehringer, 717
  - 1943 – Dick Wakefield, 697
  - 1946 – Eddie Lake, 703
  - 1953 – Harvey Kuenn, 731
  - 1963 – Rocky Colavito, 692
  - 1994 – Tony Phillips, 538
  - 1995 – Chad Curtis, 670
  - 2014 – Ian Kinsler, 726

=== Runs (15) ===
  - 1907 – Sam Crawford, 102
  - 1908 – Matty McIntyre, 105
  - 1909 – Ty Cobb, 116
  - 1910 – Ty Cobb, 106
  - 1911 – Ty Cobb, 147
  - 1915 – Ty Cobb, 144
  - 1916 – Ty Cobb, 113
  - 1917 – Donie Bush, 112
  - 1929 – Charlie Gehringer, 131
  - 1934 – Charlie Gehringer, 134
  - 1938 – Hank Greenberg, 143
  - 1959 – Eddie Yost, 115
  - 1968 – Dick McAuliffe, 95
  - 1978 – Ron LeFlore, 126
  - 1992 – Tony Phillips, 114

=== Hits (23) ===
  - 1907 – Ty Cobb, 212
  - 1908 – Ty Cobb, 188
  - 1909 – Ty Cobb, 216
  - 1911 – Ty Cobb, 248
  - 1912 – Ty Cobb, 226
  - 1915 – Ty Cobb, 208
  - 1917 – Ty Cobb, 225
  - 1919 – Ty Cobb, 191
  - 1919 – Bobby Veach, 191
  - 1921 – Harry Heilmann, 237
  - 1929 – Dale Alexander, 215
  - 1929 – Charlie Gehringer, 215
  - 1934 – Charlie Gehringer, 214
  - 1940 – Barney McCosky, 200
  - 1943 – Dick Wakefield, 200
  - 1950 – George Kell, 218
  - 1951 – George Kell, 191
  - 1953 – Harvey Kuenn, 209
  - 1954 – Harvey Kuenn, 201
  - 1955 – Al Kaline, 200
  - 1956 – Harvey Kuenn, 196
  - 1959 – Harvey Kuenn, 198
  - 1961 – Norm Cash, 193

=== Total bases (15) ===
  - 1907 – Ty Cobb, 283
  - 1908 – Ty Cobb, 276
  - 1909 – Ty Cobb, 296
  - 1911 – Ty Cobb, 367
  - 1913 – Sam Crawford, 298
  - 1915 – Ty Cobb, 274
  - 1917 – Ty Cobb, 335
  - 1935 – Hank Greenberg, 389
  - 1940 – Hank Greenberg, 384
  - 1943 – Rudy York, 301
  - 1955 – Al Kaline, 321
  - 1962 – Rocky Colavito, 309
  - 1990 – Cecil Fielder, 339
  - 2008 – Miguel Cabrera, 331
  - 2012 – Miguel Cabrera, 377

=== Singles (12) ===
  - 1907 – Ty Cobb, 165
  - 1908 – Matty McIntyre, 131
  - 1909 – Ty Cobb, 164
  - 1911 – Ty Cobb, 169
  - 1912 – Ty Cobb, 166
  - 1915 – Ty Cobb, 161
  - 1917 – Ty Cobb, 151
  - 1931 – John Stone, 142
  - 1943 – Doc Cramer, 159
  - 1951 – George Kell, 150
  - 1953 – Harvey Kuenn, 167
  - 1978 – Ron LeFlore, 153

=== Doubles (23) ===
  - 1908 – Ty Cobb, 36
  - 1909 – Sam Crawford, 35
  - 1911 – Ty Cobb, 47
  - 1915 – Bobby Veach, 40
  - 1917 – Ty Cobb, 44
  - 1919 – Bobby Veach, 45
  - 1924 – Harry Heilmann, 45
  - 1929 – Charlie Gehringer, 45
  - 1929 – Roy Johnson, 45
  - 1934 – Hank Greenberg, 63
  - 1936 – Charlie Gehringer, 60
  - 1940 – Hank Greenberg, 50
  - 1943 – Dick Wakefield, 38
  - 1950 – George Kell, 56
  - 1951 – George Kell, 36
  - 1955 – Harvey Kuenn, 38
  - 1958 – Harvey Kuenn, 39
  - 1959 – Harvey Kuenn, 42
  - 1961 – Al Kaline, 41
  - 2007 – Magglio Ordóñez, 54
  - 2011 – Miguel Cabrera, 48
  - 2014 – Miguel Cabrera, 52
  - 2021 – Jeimer Candelario, 42

=== Triples (19) ===
  - 1903 – Sam Crawford, 25
  - 1908 – Ty Cobb, 20
  - 1910 – Sam Crawford, 19
  - 1911 – Ty Cobb, 24
  - 1913 – Sam Crawford, 23
  - 1914 – Sam Crawford, 26
  - 1915 – Sam Crawford, 19
  - 1917 – Ty Cobb, 24
  - 1918 – Ty Cobb, 14
  - 1919 – Bobby Veach, 17
  - 1929 – Charlie Gehringer, 19
  - 1931 – Roy Johnson, 19
  - 1940 – Barney McCosky, 19
  - 1950 – Hoot Evers, 11
  - 1961 – Jake Wood, 14
  - 2007 – Curtis Granderson, 23
  - 2008 – Curtis Granderson, 12
  - 2012 – Austin Jackson, 10
  - 2017 – Nicholas Castellanos, 10

=== Home runs (12) ===
  - 1908 – Sam Crawford, 7
  - 1909 – Ty Cobb, 9
  - 1935 – Hank Greenberg, 36
  - 1938 – Hank Greenberg, 58
  - 1940 – Hank Greenberg, 41
  - 1943 – Rudy York, 34
  - 1946 – Hank Greenberg, 44
  - 1985 – Darrell Evans, 40
  - 1990 – Cecil Fielder, 51
  - 1991 – Cecil Fielder, 44
  - 2008 – Miguel Cabrera, 37
  - 2012 – Miguel Cabrera, 44

=== Runs batted in (21) ===
  - 1907 – Ty Cobb, 119
  - 1908 – Ty Cobb, 108
  - 1909 – Ty Cobb, 107
  - 1910 – Sam Crawford, 120
  - 1911 – Ty Cobb, 127
  - 1914 – Sam Crawford, 104
  - 1915 – Sam Crawford, 112
  - 1915 – Bobby Veach, 112
  - 1917 – Bobby Veach, 103
  - 1918 – Bobby Veach, 78
  - 1935 – Hank Greenberg, 170
  - 1937 – Hank Greenberg, 183
  - 1940 – Hank Greenberg, 150
  - 1943 – Rudy York, 118
  - 1946 – Hank Greenberg, 127
  - 1955 – Ray Boone, 116
  - 1990 – Cecil Fielder, 132
  - 1991 – Cecil Fielder, 133
  - 1992 – Cecil Fielder, 124
  - 2010 – Miguel Cabrera, 126
  - 2012 – Miguel Cabrera, 139

=== Walks (12) ===
  - 1903 – Jimmy Barrett, 74
  - 1904 – Jimmy Barrett, 79
  - 1909 – Donie Bush, 88
  - 1910 – Donie Bush, 78
  - 1911 – Donie Bush, 98
  - 1912 – Donie Bush, 117
  - 1914 – Donie Bush, 112
  - 1938 – Hank Greenberg, 119
  - 1959 – Eddie Yost, 135
  - 1960 – Eddie Yost, 125
  - 1992 – Mickey Tettleton, 122
  - 1993 – Tony Phillips, 132

=== Strikeouts (8) ===
  - 1901 – Jimmy Barrett, 64
  - 1939 – Hank Greenberg, 95
  - 1961 – Jake Wood, 141
  - 1990 – Cecil Fielder, 182
  - 1991 – Rob Deer, 175
  - 1994 – Travis Fryman, 128
  - 2006 – Curtis Granderson, 174
  - 2010 – Austin Jackson, 170

  - 2025 – Riley Greene, 201

=== Stolen bases (10) ===
  - 1907 – Ty Cobb, 53
  - 1909 – Ty Cobb, 76
  - 1911 – Ty Cobb, 83
  - 1915 – Ty Cobb, 96
  - 1916 – Ty Cobb, 68
  - 1917 – Ty Cobb, 55
  - 1929 – Charlie Gehringer, 27
  - 1930 – Marty McManus, 23
  - 1978 – Ron LeFlore, 68
  - 1997 – Brian Hunter, 74

=== Runs created (20) ===
  - 1903 – Sam Crawford, 98
  - 1907 – Ty Cobb, 106
  - 1908 – Ty Cobb, 100
  - 1909 – Ty Cobb, 126
  - 1911 – Ty Cobb, 169
  - 1915 – Ty Cobb, 138
  - 1916 – Ty Cobb, 125
  - 1917 – Ty Cobb, 148
  - 1918 – Ty Cobb, 95
  - 1935 – Hank Greenberg, 159
  - 1937 – Hank Greenberg, 172
  - 1940 – Hank Greenberg, 166
  - 1943 – Rudy York, 109
  - 1950 – George Kell, 124
  - 1959 – Harvey Kuenn, 117
  - 1961 – Norm Cash, 178
  - 2010 – Miguel Cabrera, 141
  - 2011 – Miguel Cabrera, 149
  - 2012 – Miguel Cabrera, 139
  - 2013 – Miguel Cabrera, 155

=== Extra-base hits (14) ===
  - 1907 – Sam Crawford, 55
  - 1908 – Ty Cobb, 60
  - 1909 – Sam Crawford, 55
  - 1911 – Ty Cobb, 79
  - 1913 – Sam Crawford, 64
  - 1915 – Sam Crawford, 54
  - 1917 – Ty Cobb, 74
  - 1934 – Hank Greenberg, 96
  - 1935 – Hank Greenberg, 98
  - 1937 – Hank Greenberg, 103
  - 1940 – Hank Greenberg, 99
  - 1943 – Rudy York, 67
  - 1990 – Cecil Fielder, 77
  - 2012 – Miguel Cabrera, 84

=== Times on base (14) ===
  - 1903 – Jimmy Barrett, 243
  - 1904 – Jimmy Barrett, 249
  - 1908 – Matty McIntyre, 258
  - 1909 – Ty Cobb, 270
  - 1911 – Ty Cobb, 300
  - 1915 – Ty Cobb, 336
  - 1917 – Ty Cobb, 290
  - 1925 – Harry Heilmann, 293
  - 1959 – Eddie Yost, 292
  - 1960 – Eddie Yost, 262
  - 1961 – Norm Cash, 326
  - 2010 – Miguel Cabrera, 272
  - 2011 – Miguel Cabrera, 308
  - 2012 – Prince Fielder, 284

=== Hit by pitch (13) ===
  - 1902 – Dick Harley, 12
  - 1914 – George Burns, 12
  - 1917 – Tubby Spencer, 9
  - 1917 – Bobby Veach, 9
  - 1923 – Heinie Manush, 17
  - 1924 – Heinie Manush, 16
  - 1962 – Norm Cash, 13
  - 1967 – Bill Freehan, 20
  - 1968 – Bill Freehan, 24
  - 1982 – Chet Lemon, 15
  - 1983 – Chet Lemon, 20
  - 2012 – Prince Fielder, 17

=== Sacrifice hits (14) ===
  - 1901 – Kid Nance
  - 1903 – Billy Lush
  - 1909 – Donie Bush
  - 1915 – Ossie Vitt
  - 1920 – Donie Bush
  - 1943 – Joe Hoover
  - 1944 – Eddie Mayo
  - 1958 – Billy Martin
  - 1968 – Denny McLain
  - 1969 – Denny McLain
  - 1981 – Alan Trammell
  - 1983 – Alan Trammell
  - 2003 – Ramón Santiago
  - 2009 – Adam Everett

=== Sacrifice flies (6) ===
  - 1958 – Frank Bolling, 9
  - 1963 – Bubba Phillips, 10
  - 1983 – Lance Parrish, 13
  - 1994 – Travis Fryman, 13
  - 2005 – Craig Monroe, 12
  - 2014 – Miguel Cabrera, 11

=== Intentional walks (7) ===
  - 1959 – Al Kaline, 12
  - 1961 – Norm Cash, 19
  - 1963 – Al Kaline, 12
  - 1967 – Bill Freehan, 15
  - 2010 – Miguel Cabrera, 32
  - 2012 – Prince Fielder, 18
  - 2014 – Víctor Martínez, 28

=== Grounded into double plays (8) ===
  - 1943 – Jimmy Bloodworth, 29
  - 1945 – Rudy York, 12
  - 1955 – Bill Tuttle, 25
  - 1968 – Mickey Stanley, 22
  - 1976 – Rusty Staub, 23
  - 1977 – Rusty Staub, 27
  - 2008 – Magglio Ordóñez, 27
  - 2012 – Miguel Cabrera, 28

=== At bats per strikeout (9) ===
  - 1916 – Sam Crawford, 32.2
  - 1943 – Doc Cramer, 46.6
  - 1975 – Dan Meyer, 18.8
  - 2002 – Randall Simon, 16.1
  - 2006 – Plácido Polanco, 17.1
  - 2007 – Plácido Polanco, 19.6
  - 2008 – Plácido Polanco, 13.5
  - 2013 – Víctor Martínez, 9.8
  - 2014 – Víctor Martínez, 13.4

=== At bats per home run (9) ===
  - 1909 – Ty Cobb, 63.7
  - 1937 – Rudy York, 10.7
  - 1938 – Hank Greenberg, 9.6
  - 1940 – Hank Greenberg, 14.0
  - 1946 – Hank Greenberg, 11.9
  - 1965 – Norm Cash, 15.6
  - 1971 – Norm Cash, 14.1
  - 1985 – Darrell Evans, 12.6
  - 1990 – Cecil Fielder, 11.2

=== Outs (16) ===
  - 1908 – Germany Schaefer, 476
  - 1911 – Donie Bush, 461
  - 1914 – Donie Bush, 482
  - 1931 – Roy Johnson, 471
  - 1943 – Joe Hoover, 478
  - 1946 – Eddie Lake, 464
  - 1947 – Eddie Lake, 508
  - 1953 – Harvey Kuenn, 486
  - 1954 – Harvey Kuenn, 493
  - 1955 – Bill Tuttle. 481
  - 1974 – Gary Sutherland, 489
  - 1992 – Travis Fryman, 512
  - 1995 – Chad Curtis, 463
  - 1997 – Brian Hunter, 525
  - 2014 – Ian Kinsler, 528

=== Six-hit games (9 innings) (6) ===
  - 1901 – Kid Nance
  - 1920 – Bobby Veach
  - 1925 – Ty Cobb
  - 1946 – George Kell
  - 2001 – Damion Easley
  - 2004 – Carlos Peña

== American League statistical pitching leaders ==
=== Wins (20) ===
  - 1909 – George Mullin, 29
  - 1936 – Tommy Bridges, 23
  - 1943 – Dizzy Trout, 20
  - 1944 – Hal Newhouser, 29
  - 1945 – Hal Newhouser, 25
  - 1946 – Hal Newhouser, 26
  - 1948 – Hal Newhouser, 21
  - 1956 – Frank Lary, 21
  - 1957 – Jim Bunning, 20
  - 1967 – Earl Wilson, 22
  - 1968 – Denny McLain, 31
  - 1969 – Denny McLain, 24
  - 1971 – Mickey Lolich, 25
  - 1981 – Jack Morris, 14
  - 1991 – Bill Gullickson, 20
  - 2009 – Justin Verlander, 19
  - 2011 – Justin Verlander, 24
  - 2013 – Max Scherzer, 21
  - 2014 – Max Scherzer, 18
  - 2024 – Tarik Skubal, 18

=== Win–loss Percentage (9) ===
  - 1904 – Bill Donovan, .862
  - 1909 – George Mullin, .784
  - 1935 – Elden Auker, .720
  - 1940 – Schoolboy Rowe, .842
  - 1968 – Denny McLain, .838
  - 2007 – Justin Verlander, .750
  - 2011 – Justin Verlander, .828
  - 2013 – Max Scherzer, .875
  - 2024 – Tarik Skubal, .818

=== Earned Run Average (ERA) (11) ===
  - 1902 – Ed Siever, 1.91
  - 1944 – Dizzy Trout, 2.12
  - 1945 – Hal Newhouser, 1.81
  - 1946 – Hal Newhouser, 1.94
  - 1951 – Saul Rogovin, 2.78
  - 1962 – Hank Aguirre, 2.21
  - 1976 – Mark Fidrych, 2.34
  - 2011 – Justin Verlander, 2.40
  - 2013 – Aníbal Sánchez, 2.57
  - 2024 – Tarik Skubal, 2.39
  - 2025 – Tarik Skubal, 2.21

=== Strikeouts (15) ===
  - 1935 – Tommy Bridges, 163
  - 1936 – Tommy Bridges, 175
  - 1944 – Hal Newhouser, 187
  - 1945 – Hal Newhouser, 212
  - 1949 – Virgil Trucks, 153
  - 1959 – Jim Bunning, 201
  - 1960 – Jim Bunning, 201
  - 1971 – Mickey Lolich, 308
  - 1983 – Jack Morris, 232
  - 2009 – Justin Verlander, 269
  - 2011 – Justin Verlander, 250
  - 2012 – Justin Verlander, 239
  - 2014 – David Price, 271
  - 2016 – Justin Verlander, 254
  - 2024 – Tarik Skubal, 228

=== Saves (5) ===
  - 1903 – George Mullin, 2
  - 1940 – Al Benton, 17
  - 1973 – John Hiller, 38
  - 2000 – Todd Jones, 42
  - 2011 – José Valverde, 49

=== No Hitters (8) ===
  - 1912 – George Mullin
  - 1952 – Virgil Trucks
  - 1952 – Virgil Trucks
  - 1958 – Jim Bunning
  - 1984 – Jack Morris
  - 2007 – Justin Verlander
  - 2011 – Justin Verlander
  - 2021 - Spencer Turnbull

=== Walks Plus Hits per Inning Pitched (WHIP) (7) ===
  - 1933 – Firpo Marberry, 1.229
  - 1946 – Hal Newhouser, 1.069
  - 1949 – Fred Hutchinson, 1.161
  - 1962 – Hank Aguirre, 1.051
  - 2011 – Justin Verlander, .920
  - 2013 – Max Scherzer, .970
  - 2025 – Tarik Skubal, .891

=== Hits Allowed per 9 Innings Pitched (8) ===
  - 1933 – Tommy Bridges, 7.416
  - 1941 – Al Benton, 7.421
  - 1942 – Hal Newhouser, 6.713
  - 1945 – Hal Newhouser, 6.865
  - 1946 – Hal Newhouser, 6.612
  - 1962 – Hank Aguirre, 6.750
  - 1988 – Jeff Robinson, 6.331
  - 2011 – Justin Verlander, 6.239

=== Walks Allowed per 9 Innings Pitched (8) ===
  - 1948 – Fred Hutchinson, 1.955
  - 1949 – Fred Hutchinson, 2.481
  - 1950 – Fred Hutchinson, 1.865
  - 1951 – Fred Hutchinson, 1.290
  - 1955 – Steve Gromek, 1.840
  - 1961 – Don Mossi, 1.760
  - 1977 – Dave Rozema, 1.402
  - 2025 – Tarik Skubal, 1.520

=== Strikeouts Allowed per 9 Innings Pitched (9) ===
  - 1920 – Doc Ayers, 4.442
  - 1923 – Syl Johnson, 4.747
  - 1942 – Hal Newhouser, 5.047
  - 1944 – Hal Newhouser, 5.388
  - 1945 – Hal Newhouser, 6.089
  - 1946 – Hal Newhouser, 8.457
  - 1960 – Jim Bunning, 7.179
  - 2009 – Justin Verlander, 10.088
  - 2012 – Max Scherzer, 11.078

=== Innings Pitched (15) ===
  - 1905 – George Mullin, 347 2/3
  - 1944 – Dizzy Trout, 352 1/3
  - 1945 – Hal Newhouser, 313 1/3
  - 1956 – Frank Lary, 294
  - 1957 – Jim Bunning, 267 1/3
  - 1958 – Frank Lary, 260 1/3
  - 1960 – Frank Lary, 274 1/3
  - 1968 – Denny McLain, 336
  - 1969 – Denny McLain, 325
  - 1971 – Mickey Lolich, 376
  - 1983 – Jack Morris, 293 2/3
  - 2009 – Justin Verlander, 240
  - 2011 – Justin Verlander, 251
  - 2012 – Justin Verlander, 238 1/3
  - 2014 – David Price, 248

=== Games Started (22) ===
  - 1905 – George Mullin, 41
  - 1925 – Earl Whitehill, 33
  - 1934 – Tommy Bridges, 35
  - 1936 – Tommy Bridges, 38
  - 1944 – Dizzy Trout, 40
  - 1945 – Hal Newhouser, 36
  - 1956 – Frank Lary, 38
  - 1959 – Paul Foytack, 37
  - 1960 – Frank Lary, 36
  - 1968 – Denny McLain, 41
  - 1969 – Denny McLain, 41
  - 1971 – Mickey Lolich, 45
  - 1983 – Dan Petry, 38
  - 1990 – Jack Morris, 36
  - 1991 – Bill Gullickson, 35
  - 1993 – Mike Moore, 36
  - 1994 – Tim Belcher, 25
  - 1994 – Mike Moore, 25
  - 2006 – Jeremy Bonderman, 34
  - 2009 – Justin Verlander, 35
  - 2011 – Justin Verlander, 34
  - 2013 – Justin Verlander, 34

=== Complete Games (14) ===
  - 1903 – Bill Donovan, 34
  - 1905 – George Mullin, 35
  - 1944 – Dizzy Trout, 33
  - 1945 – Hal Newhouser, 29
  - 1947 – Hal Newhouser, 24
  - 1958 – Frank Lary, 19
  - 1960 – Frank Lary, 15
  - 1961 – Frank Lary, 22
  - 1968 – Denny McLain, 28
  - 1971 – Mickey Lolich, 29
  - 1976 – Mark Fidrych, 24
  - 1990 – Jack Morris, 11
  - 2001 – Steve Sparks, 8
  - 2012 – Justin Verlander, 6

=== Shutouts (17) ===
  - 1905 – Ed Killian, 8
  - 1926 – Ed Wells, 4
  - 1932 – Tommy Bridges, 4
  - 1935 – Schoolboy Rowe, 6
  - 1943 – Dizzy Trout, 5
  - 1944 – Dizzy Trout, 7
  - 1945 – Hal Newhouser, 8
  - 1949 – Virgil Trucks, 6
  - 1950 – Art Houtteman, 4
  - 1955 – Billy Hoeft, 7
  - 1967 – Mickey Lolich, 6
  - 1969 – Denny McLain, 9
  - 1986 – Jack Morris, 6
  - 2004 – Jeremy Bonderman, 2
  - 2014 – Rick Porcello, 3
  - 2024 – Keider Montero, 1
  - 2025 – Tarik Skubal, 1

=== Walks Allowed (11) ===
  - 1903 – George Mullin, 106
  - 1904 – George Mullin, 131
  - 1905 – George Mullin, 138
  - 1906 – George Mullin, 108
  - 1919 – Howard Ehmke, 107
  - 1927 – Earl Whitehill, 105
  - 1943 – Hal Newhouser, 111
  - 1944 – Rufe Gentry, 108
  - 1956 – Paul Foytack, 142
  - 1981 – Jack Morris, 78
  - 1994 – Mike Moore, 89

=== Hits Allowed (15) ===
  - 1905 – George Mullin, 303
  - 1907 – George Mullin, 346
  - 1915 – Harry Coveleski, 271
  - 1944 – Dizzy Trout, 314
  - 1947 – Hal Newhouser, 268
  - 1949 – Hal Newhouser, 277
  - 1955 – Ned Garver, 251
  - 1956 – Frank Lary, 289
  - 1960 – Frank Lary, 262
  - 1962 – Jim Bunning, 262
  - 1969 – Denny McLain, 288
  - 1971 – Mickey Lolich, 336
  - 1991 – Walt Terrell, 257
  - 2012 – Rick Porcello, 226
  - 2014 – David Price, 230

=== Home Runs Allowed (23) ===
  - 1910 – Sailor Stroud, 9
  - 1931 – Earl Whitehill, 22
  - 1935 – Tommy Bridges, 22
  - 1946 – Virgil Trucks, 23
  - 1948 – Fred Hutchinson, 32
  - 1950 – Art Houtteman, 29
  - 1953 – Ted Gray, 25
  - 1954 – Steve Gromek, 26
  - 1955 – Steve Gromek, 26
  - 1959 – Jim Bunning, 37
  - 1963 – Jim Bunning, 38
  - 1966 – Denny McLain, 42
  - 1967 – Denny McLain, 35
  - 1968 – Denny McLain, 31
  - 1972 – Mickey Lolich, 29
  - 1974 – Mickey Lolich, 38
  - 1983 – Dan Petry, 37
  - 1989 – Doyle Alexander, 28
  - 1992 – Bill Gullickson, 35
  - 1993 – Mike Moore, 35
  - 2003 – Mike Maroth, 34
  - 2015 – Aníbal Sánchez, 29
  - 2020 – Matthew Boyd, 15

=== Strikeout to Walk (13) ===
  - 1921 – Dutch Leonard, 1.905
  - 1934 – Schoolboy Rowe, 1.840
  - 1935 – Schoolboy Rowe, 2.059
  - 1947 – Fred Hutchinson, 1.852
  - 1948 – Fred Hutchinson, 1.917
  - 1950 – Fred Hutchinson, 1.479
  - 1951 – Fred Hutchinson, 1.963
  - 1954 – Billy Hoeft, 1.932
  - 1959 – Frank Lary, 2.978
  - 1960 – Jim Bunning, 3.141
  - 1961 – Don Mossi, 2.915
  - 1968 – Denny McLain, 4.444
  - 2025 – Tarik Skubal, 7.303

=== Losses (15) ===
  - 1923 – Herman Pillette, 19
  - 1941 – Bobo Newsom, 20
  - 1947 – Hal Newhouser, 17
  - 1951 – Ted Gray, 14
  - 1951 – Dizzy Trout, 14
  - 1952 – Art Houtteman, 20
  - 1970 – Mickey Lolich, 19
  - 1974 – Mickey Lolich, 21
  - 1989 – Doyle Alexander, 18
  - 1994 – Tim Belcher, 15
  - 1995 – Mike Moore, 15
  - 1999 – Brian Moehler, 16
  - 2003 – Mike Maroth, 21
  - 2008 – Justin Verlander, 17
  - 2025 – Jack Flaherty, 15

=== Earned Runs Allowed (18) ===
  - 1907 – George Mullin, 103
  - 1908 – George Mullin, 100
  - 1910 – George Mullin, 92
  - 1914 – Hooks Dauss, 96
  - 1918 – Hooks Dauss, 83
  - 1922 – Howard Ehmke, 131
  - 1926 – Earl Whitehill, 112
  - 1949 – Hal Newhouser, 109
  - 1955 – Ned Garver, 102
  - 1959 – Paul Foytack, 124
  - 1966 – Denny McLain, 115
  - 1970 – Mickey Lolich, 115
  - 1974 – Mickey Lolich, 142
  - 1990 – Jack Morris, 125
  - 2003 – Mike Maroth, 123
  - 2008 – Nate Robertson, 119
  - 2014 – Justin Verlander, 104
  - 2025 – Chris Paddack, 94

=== Wild Pitches (13) ===
  - 1902 – George Mullin, 13
  - 1912 – Jean Dubuc, 16
  - 1913 – Jean Dubuc, 13
  - 1920 – Dutch Leonard, 13
  - 1931 – Tommy Bridges, 9
  - 1945 – Hal Newhouser, 10
  - 1947 – Hal Newhouser, 11
  - 1975 – Joe Coleman, 15
  - 1983 – Jack Morris, 18
  - 1984 – Jack Morris, 14
  - 1985 – Jack Morris, 15
  - 1987 – Jack Morris, 24
  - 2007 – Justin Verlander, 17

=== Hit Batters (23) ===
  - 1908 – Ed Summers, 20
  - 1912 – Ed Willett, 17
  - 1914 – Hooks Dauss, 18
  - 1915 – Harry Coveleski, 20
  - 1916 – Hooks Dauss, 16
  - 1921 – Hooks Dauss, 13
  - 1921 – Howard Ehmke, 13
  - 1922 – Howard Ehmke, 23
  - 1924 – Earl Whitehill, 13
  - 1930 – Elon Hogsett, 9
  - 1931 – Art Herring, 8
  - 1933 – Tommy Bridges, 6
  - 1954 – Steve Gromek, 12
  - 1956 – Frank Lary, 12
  - 1957 – Frank Lary, 12
  - 1958 – Frank Lary, 12
  - 1960 – Frank Lary, 19
  - 1965 – Mickey Lolich, 12
  - 1973 – Joe Coleman, 10
  - 1974 – Joe Coleman, 12
  - 1999 – Jeff Weaver, 17
  - 2000 – Jeff Weaver, 15
  - 2007 – Justin Verlander, 19

=== Batters Faced (13) ===
  - 1905 – George Mullin, 1,428
  - 1906 – George Mullin, 1,361
  - 1944 – Dizzy Trout, 1,421
  - 1945 – Hal Newhouser, 1,261
  - 1956 – Frank Lary, 1,269
  - 1968 – Denny McLain, 1,288
  - 1969 – Denny McLain, 1,304
  - 1971 – Mickey Lolich, 1,538
  - 1983 – Jack Morris, 1,204
  - 2001 – Jeff Weaver, 985
  - 2009 – Justin Verlander, 982
  - 2012 – Justin Verlander, 956
  - 2014 – David Price, 1,009

=== Games Finished (7) ===
  - 1933 – Elon Hogsett, 34
  - 1935 – Elon Hogsett, 30
  - 1973 – John Hiller, 60
  - 1984 – Willie Hernández, 68
  - 2009 – Fernando Rodney, 65
  - 2011 – José Valverde, 70
  - 2012 – José Valverde, 67

== See also ==
- Baseball awards
- List of Major League Baseball awards
