= Thomas Gage (disambiguation) =

Thomas Gage (1719–1787) was a British general and commander in chief of the North American forces during the early days of the American Revolution.

Thomas Gage may also refer to:

- Thomas Gage (priest) (c. 1597–1656), English clergyman and traveler in the New World
- Thomas Gage, 1st Viscount Gage (before 1702–1754), English nobleman and Member of Parliament; father of the general Thomas Gage
- Thomas Gage (botanist) (1781–1820), English botanist 7th Baronet, of Hengrave
- Tom Gage (athlete) (1943–2010), American hammer thrower
- Tom Gage (journalist) (born 1948), American sportswriter
