= List of Silver Slugger Award winners at catcher =

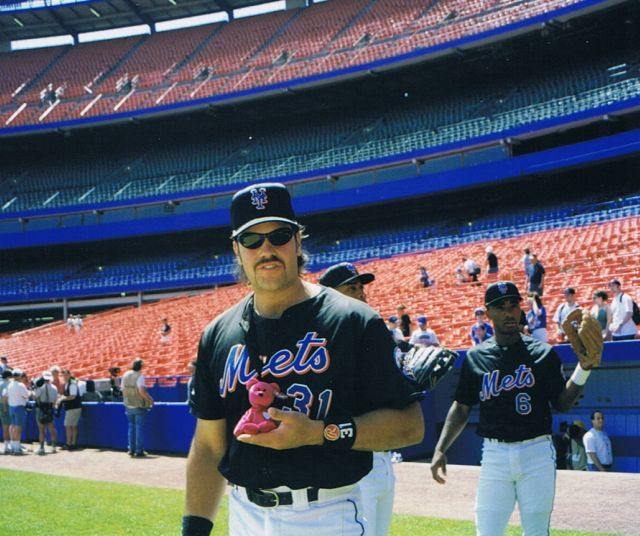
Mike Piazza is the all-time leader in Silver Slugger Awards among catchers, winning ten consecutive from 1993 to 2002.

The Silver Slugger Award is awarded annually to the best offensive player at each position in both the American League (AL) and the National League (NL), as determined by the coaches and managers of Major League Baseball (MLB). These voters consider several offensive categories in selecting the winners, including batting average, slugging percentage, and on-base percentage (OBP), in addition to "coaches' and managers' general impressions of a player's overall offensive value." Managers and coaches are not permitted to vote for players on their own team. The Silver Slugger was first awarded in 1980 and is given by Hillerich & Bradsby, the manufacturer of Louisville Slugger bats. The award is a bat-shaped trophy, 3feet (91cm) tall, engraved with the names of each of the winners from the league and plated with sterling silver.

Among catchers, Mike Piazza has won the most Silver Slugger Awards, with ten consecutive wins in the National League between 1993 and 2002; this is the most Silver Sluggers won consecutively by any player in Major League Baseball. In the American League, Iván Rodríguez has won the most Silver Sluggers, with six consecutive wins from 1994 to 1999, and a seventh when he tied with Víctor Martínez in 2004. Lance Parrish won the American League award six times (1980, 1982–1984, 1986, and 1990), and Joe Mauer, Jorge Posada and Salvador Pérez have won it five times; Mauer won in 2006, 2008–2010 and 2013, Posada won in 2000–2003 and 2007, and Pérez won it in 2016, 2018, 2020, 2021 and 2024. Hall of Famer Gary Carter (1981–1983, 1984–1986), Buster Posey (2012, 2014–2015, 2017, 2021), and Brian McCann (2006, 2008–2011) are five-time winners in the National League; McCann also won a sixth Silver Slugger in 2016, but in the American League. Other multiple awardees include Benito Santiago (four wins; 1987–1988, 1990–1991), J. T. Realmuto (three wins; 2018–2019, 2022), Mickey Tettleton (three wins; 1989, 1991–1992) and Carlton Fisk (three wins; 1981, 1985, 1988). Gabriel Moreno and Dillon Dingler are the most recent National and American League winners, respectively.

Piazza holds several Major League records for catchers in a Silver Slugger-winning season; most were set in 1997. That season, he had an on-base percentage of .431, and had 124 runs batted in (a total he matched in 1999) to lead the award-winning catchers in those statistical categories. Cal Raleigh holds the Major League record among winners for home runs (60) and runs batted in (125), which he both set in 2025. Perez holds the American League record for slugging percentage (.633), set in 2020. Javy López holds the Major League record among winners for slugging percentage (.687); these were set in 2003. López also leads National League winners in home runs with 43 in 2003. Mauer holds the Major League record in batting average with a .365 clip he set in 2009. Mauer also leads the American League in on-base percentage (.444 in 2009).

== Key ==
| Year | Links to the corresponding Major League Baseball season |
| AVG | Batting average |
| OBP | On-base percentage |
| SLG | Slugging percentage |
| HR | Home runs |
| RBI | Runs batted in |
| Ref | References |
| * | Winner of the most Silver Sluggers in Major League Baseball as a catcher |
| § | Indicates a tie between two players in a particular season |
| † | Member of the National Baseball Hall of Fame and Museum |

== American League winners ==
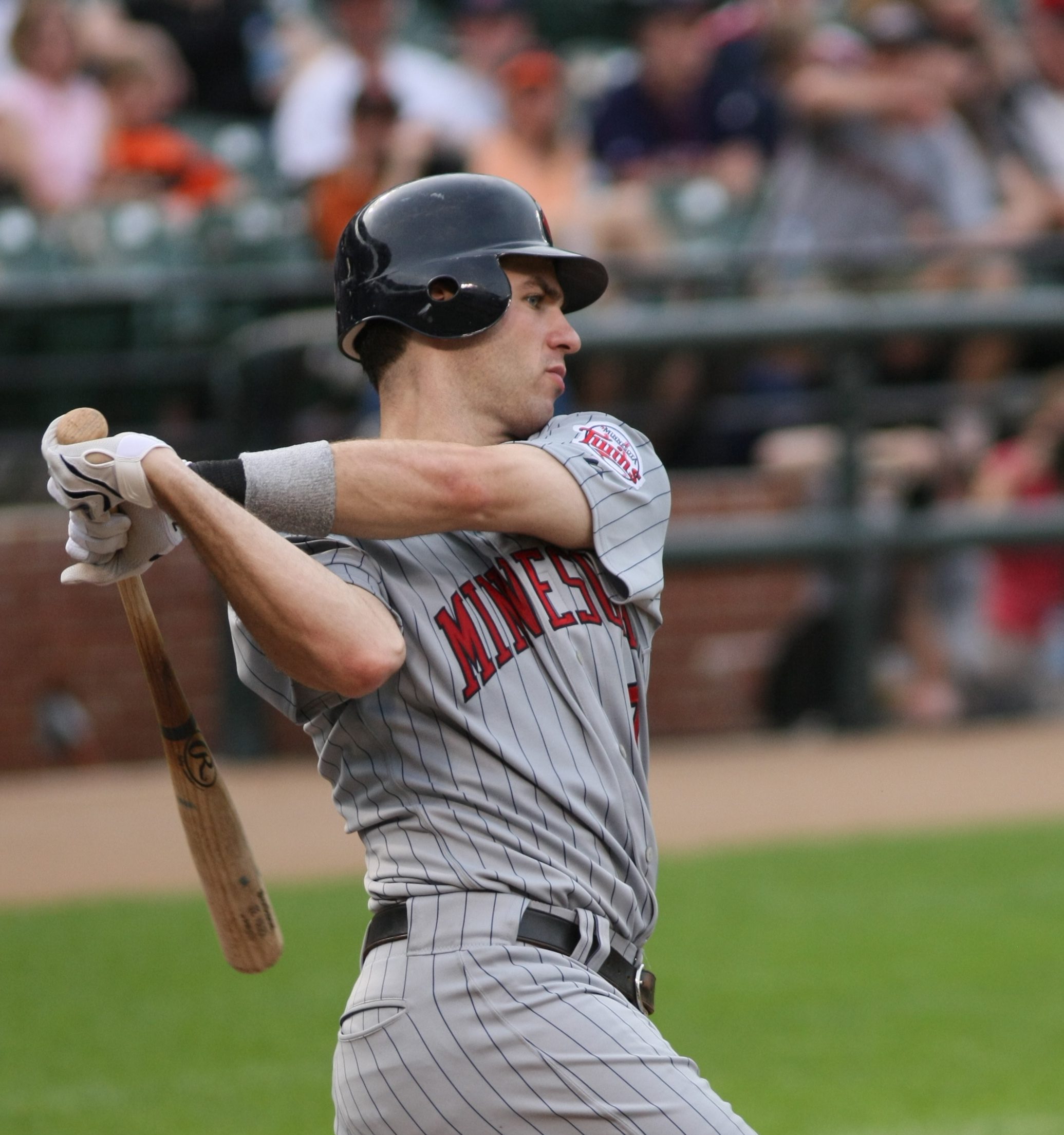
Joe Mauer won four AL Silver Sluggers at catcher (2006, 2008–2010).

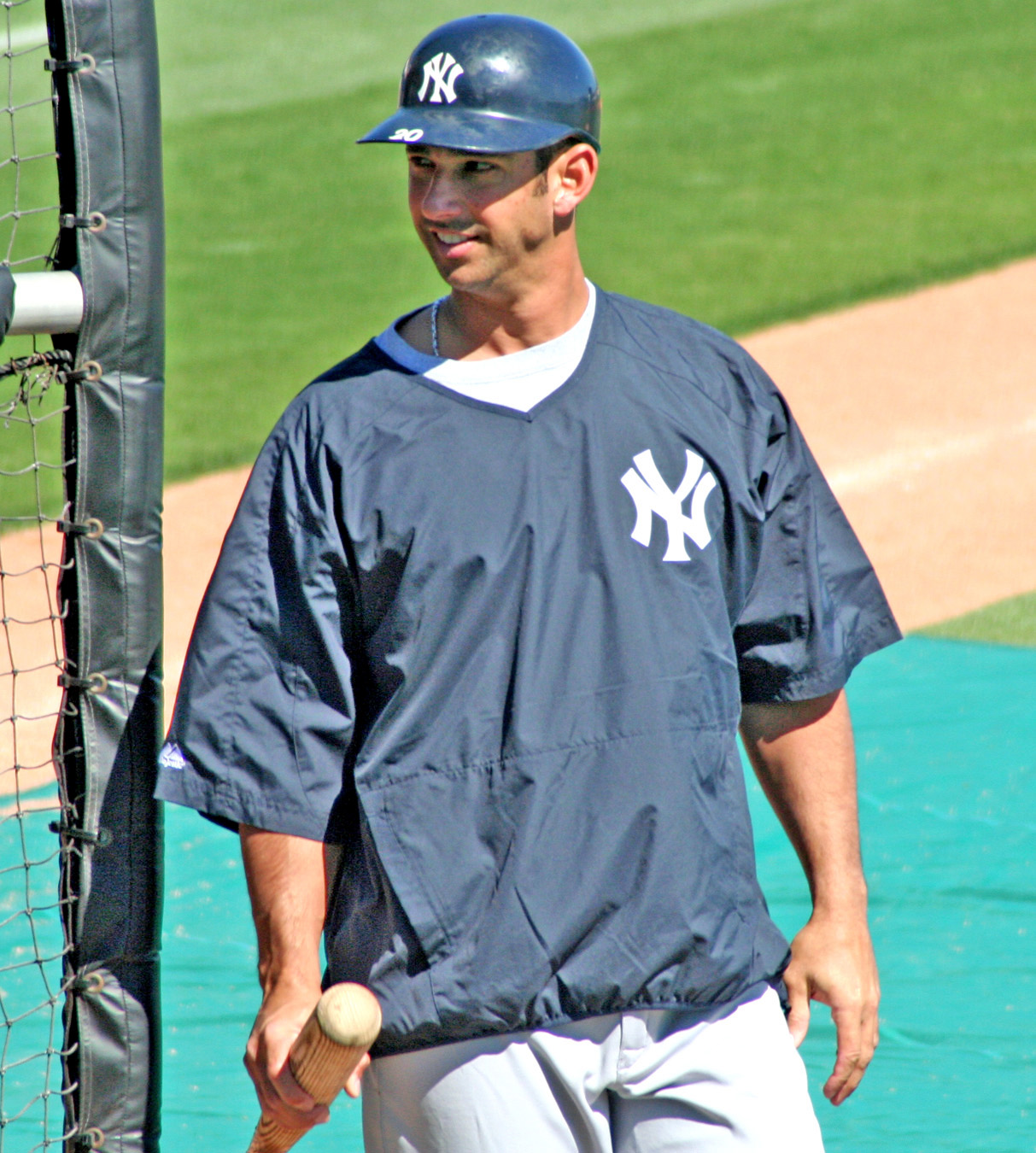
Jorge Posada has won five AL Silver Sluggers as a catcher (2000–2003, 2007).

| Year | Player | Team | AVG | OBP | SLG | HR | RBI | Ref |
|---|---|---|---|---|---|---|---|---|
| 1980 | Lance Parrish | Detroit Tigers | .286 | .325 | .499 | 24 | 82 | |
| 1981 | Carlton Fisk^{†} | Chicago White Sox | .263 | .354 | .361 | 7 | 45 | |
| 1982 | Lance Parrish (2) | Detroit Tigers | .284 | .338 | .529 | 32 | 87 | |
| 1983 | Lance Parrish (3) | Detroit Tigers | .269 | .314 | .483 | 27 | 114 | |
| 1984 | Lance Parrish (4) | Detroit Tigers | .237 | .287 | .443 | 33 | 98 | |
| 1985 | Carlton Fisk^{†} (2) | Chicago White Sox | .238 | .320 | .488 | 37 | 107 | |
| 1986 | Lance Parrish (5) | Detroit Tigers | .257 | .340 | .483 | 22 | 62 | |
| 1987 | Matt Nokes | Detroit Tigers | .289 | .345 | .536 | 32 | 87 | |
| 1988 | Carlton Fisk^{†} (3) | Chicago White Sox | .277 | .377 | .542 | 19 | 50 | |
| 1989 | Mickey Tettleton | Baltimore Orioles | .258 | .369 | .509 | 26 | 65 | |
| 1990 | Lance Parrish (6) | California Angels | .268 | .338 | .451 | 24 | 70 | |
| 1991 | Mickey Tettleton (2) | Detroit Tigers | .263 | .387 | .491 | 31 | 89 | |
| 1992 | Mickey Tettleton (3) | Detroit Tigers | .238 | .379 | .469 | 32 | 83 | |
| 1993 | Mike Stanley | New York Yankees | .305 | .389 | .534 | 26 | 84 | |
| 1994 | Iván Rodríguez^{†} | Texas Rangers | .298 | .360 | .488 | 16 | 57 | |
| 1995 | Iván Rodríguez^{†} (2) | Texas Rangers | .303 | .327 | .449 | 12 | 67 | |
| 1996 | Iván Rodríguez^{†} (3) | Texas Rangers | .300 | .342 | .473 | 19 | 86 | |
| 1997 | Iván Rodríguez^{†} (4) | Texas Rangers | .313 | .360 | .484 | 20 | 77 | |
| 1998 | Iván Rodríguez^{†} (5) | Texas Rangers | .321 | .358 | .513 | 21 | 91 | |
| 1999 | Iván Rodríguez^{†} (6) | Texas Rangers | .332 | .356 | .558 | 35 | 113 | |
| 2000 | Jorge Posada | New York Yankees | .287 | .417 | .527 | 28 | 86 | |
| 2001 | Jorge Posada (2) | New York Yankees | .277 | .363 | .475 | 22 | 95 | |
| 2002 | Jorge Posada (3) | New York Yankees | .268 | .370 | .468 | 20 | 99 | |
| 2003 | Jorge Posada (4) | New York Yankees | .281 | .405 | .518 | 30 | 101 | |
| 2004^{§} | Víctor Martínez | Cleveland Indians | .283 | .359 | .492 | 23 | 108 | |
| 2004^{§} | Iván Rodríguez^{†} (7) | Detroit Tigers | .334 | .383 | .510 | 19 | 86 | |
| 2005 | Jason Varitek | Boston Red Sox | .281 | .366 | .489 | 22 | 70 | |
| 2006 | Joe Mauer^{†} | Minnesota Twins | .347 | .429 | .507 | 13 | 84 | |
| 2007 | Jorge Posada (5) | New York Yankees | .338 | .426 | .543 | 20 | 90 | |
| 2008 | Joe Mauer^{†} (2) | Minnesota Twins | .328 | .413 | .451 | 9 | 85 | |
| 2009 | Joe Mauer^{†} (3) | Minnesota Twins | .365 | .444 | .587 | 28 | 96 | |
| 2010 | Joe Mauer^{†} (4) | Minnesota Twins | .327 | .402 | .469 | 9 | 75 | |
| 2011 | Alex Avila | Detroit Tigers | .295 | .389 | .506 | 19 | 82 | |
| 2012 | A. J. Pierzynski | Chicago White Sox | .278 | .326 | .501 | 27 | 77 | |
| 2013 | Joe Mauer^{†} (5) | Minnesota Twins | .324 | .404 | .476 | 11 | 47 | |
| 2014 | Yan Gomes | Cleveland Indians | .278 | .313 | .472 | 21 | 74 | |
| 2015 | Brian McCann (6) | New York Yankees | .232 | .320 | .427 | 26 | 94 | |
| 2016 | Salvador Pérez | Kansas City Royals | .247 | .288 | .438 | 22 | 64 | |
| 2017 | Gary Sánchez | New York Yankees | .278 | .345 | .531 | 33 | 90 | |
| 2018 | Salvador Pérez (2) | Kansas City Royals | .235 | .274 | .439 | 27 | 80 | |
| 2019 | Mitch Garver | Minnesota Twins | .273 | .365 | .630 | 31 | 67 | |
| 2020 | Salvador Pérez (3) | Kansas City Royals | .333 | .353 | .633 | 11 | 32 | |
| 2021 | Salvador Pérez (4) | Kansas City Royals | .273 | .316 | .544 | 48 | 121 | |
| 2022 | Alejandro Kirk | Toronto Blue Jays | .285 | .372 | .415 | 14 | 63 | |
| 2023 | Adley Rutschman | Baltimore Orioles | .277 | .374 | .435 | 20 | 80 | |
| 2024 | Salvador Pérez (5) | Kansas City Royals | .271 | .330 | .456 | 27 | 104 | |
| 2025 | Cal Raleigh | Seattle Mariners | .247 | .359 | .589 | 60 | 125 | |
| 2026 | Dillon Dingler | Detroit Tigers | .243 | .302 | .446 | 27 | 91 | |

== National League winners ==
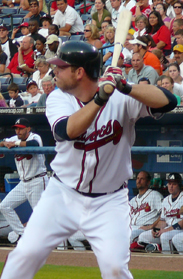
Brian McCann is the only player to win the Silver Slugger Award as a catcher in both leagues.

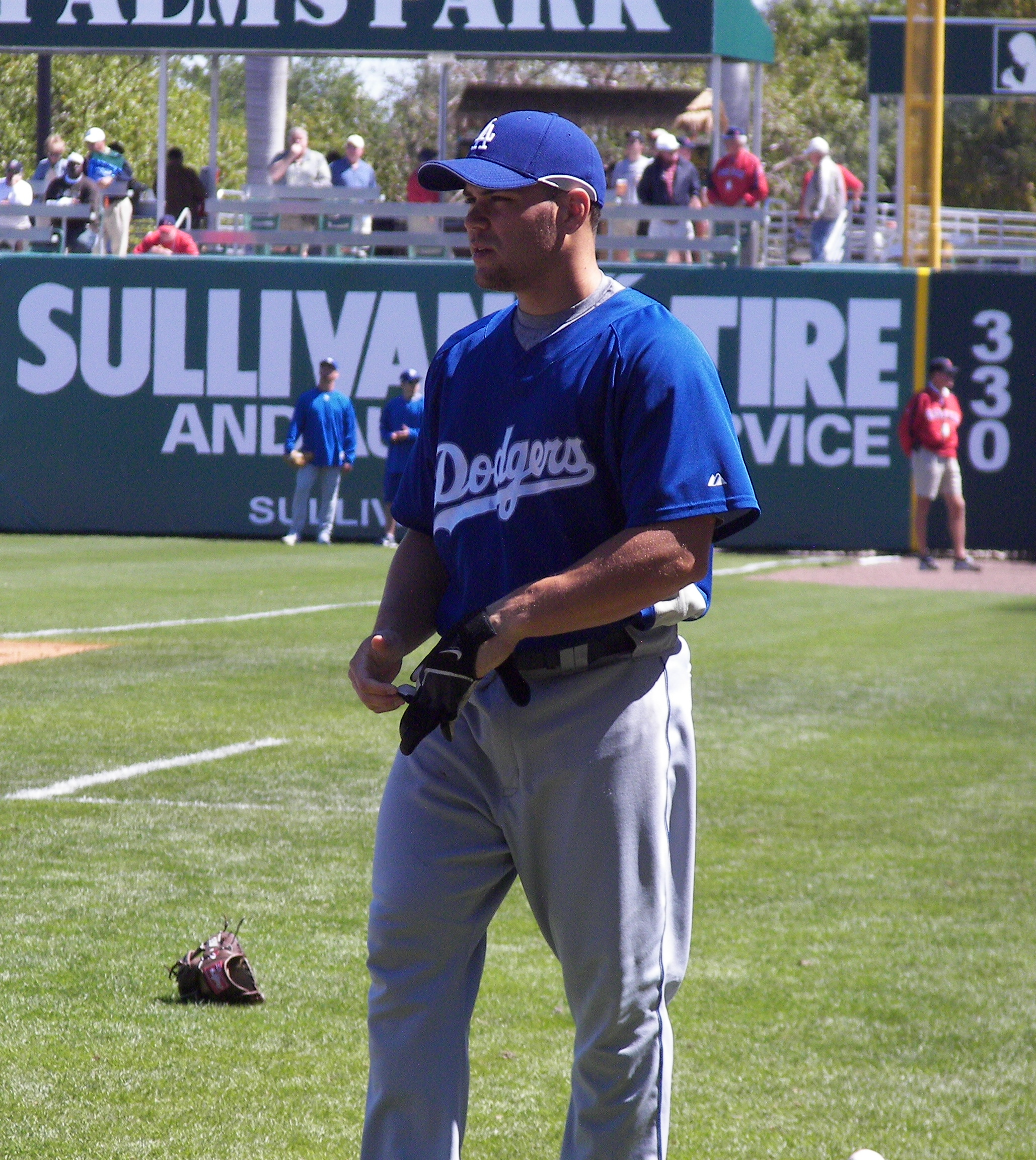
Russell Martin stole 21 bases as a catcher during his NL Silver Slugger-winning season (2007).

| Year | Player | Team | AVG | OBP | SLG | HR | RBI | Ref |
|---|---|---|---|---|---|---|---|---|
| 1980 | Ted Simmons^{†} | St. Louis Cardinals | .303 | .375 | .505 | 21 | 98 | |
| 1981 | Gary Carter^{†} | Montreal Expos | .251 | .313 | .444 | 16 | 68 | |
| 1982 | Gary Carter^{†} (2) | Montreal Expos | .293 | .381 | .510 | 29 | 97 | |
| 1983 | Terry Kennedy | San Diego Padres | .284 | .342 | .434 | 17 | 98 | |
| 1984 | Gary Carter^{†} (3) | Montreal Expos | .294 | .366 | .487 | 27 | 106 | |
| 1985 | Gary Carter^{†} (4) | New York Mets | .281 | .365 | .488 | 32 | 100 | |
| 1986 | Gary Carter^{†} (5) | New York Mets | .255 | .337 | .439 | 24 | 105 | |
| 1987 | Benito Santiago | San Diego Padres | .300 | .324 | .467 | 18 | 79 | |
| 1988 | Benito Santiago (2) | San Diego Padres | .248 | .282 | .362 | 10 | 46 | |
| 1989 | Craig Biggio^{†} | Houston Astros | .257 | .336 | .402 | 13 | 60 | |
| 1990 | Benito Santiago (3) | San Diego Padres | .270 | .323 | .419 | 11 | 53 | |
| 1991 | Benito Santiago (4) | San Diego Padres | .267 | .296 | .403 | 17 | 87 | |
| 1992 | Darren Daulton | Philadelphia Phillies | .270 | .385 | .524 | 27 | 109 | |
| 1993 | Mike Piazza*^{†} | Los Angeles Dodgers | .318 | .370 | .561 | 35 | 112 | |
| 1994 | Mike Piazza*^{†} (2) | Los Angeles Dodgers | .319 | .370 | .541 | 24 | 92 | |
| 1995 | Mike Piazza*^{†} (3) | Los Angeles Dodgers | .346 | .400 | .606 | 32 | 93 | |
| 1996 | Mike Piazza*^{†} (4) | Los Angeles Dodgers | .336 | .422 | .563 | 36 | 105 | |
| 1997 | Mike Piazza*^{†} (5) | Los Angeles Dodgers | .362 | .431 | .638 | 40 | 124 | |
| 1998 | Mike Piazza*^{†} (6) | Los Angeles Dodgers; Florida Marlins; New York Mets | .328 | .390 | .570 | 32 | 111 | |
| 1999 | Mike Piazza*^{†} (7) | New York Mets | .303 | .361 | .575 | 40 | 124 | |
| 2000 | Mike Piazza*^{†} (8) | New York Mets | .324 | .398 | .614 | 38 | 113 | |
| 2001 | Mike Piazza*^{†} (9) | New York Mets | .300 | .384 | .573 | 36 | 94 | |
| 2002 | Mike Piazza*^{†} (10) | New York Mets | .280 | .359 | .544 | 33 | 98 | |
| 2003 | Javy López | Atlanta Braves | .328 | .378 | .687 | 43 | 109 | |
| 2004 | Johnny Estrada | Atlanta Braves | .314 | .378 | .450 | 9 | 76 | |
| 2005 | Michael Barrett | Chicago Cubs | .276 | .345 | .479 | 16 | 61 | |
| 2006 | Brian McCann | Atlanta Braves | .333 | .388 | .572 | 24 | 93 | |
| 2007 | Russell Martin | Los Angeles Dodgers | .293 | .374 | .469 | 19 | 87 | |
| 2008 | Brian McCann (2) | Atlanta Braves | .301 | .373 | .523 | 23 | 87 | |
| 2009 | Brian McCann (3) | Atlanta Braves | .281 | .349 | .486 | 21 | 94 | |
| 2010 | Brian McCann (4) | Atlanta Braves | .269 | .375 | .453 | 21 | 77 | |
| 2011 | Brian McCann (5) | Atlanta Braves | .270 | .351 | .466 | 24 | 71 | |
| 2012 | Buster Posey | San Francisco Giants | .336 | .408 | .549 | 24 | 103 | |
| 2013 | Yadier Molina | St. Louis Cardinals | .319 | .359 | .477 | 12 | 80 | |
| 2014 | Buster Posey (2) | San Francisco Giants | .311 | .364 | .490 | 22 | 89 | |
| 2015 | Buster Posey (3) | San Francisco Giants | .318 | .379 | .470 | 19 | 95 | |
| 2016 | Wilson Ramos | Washington Nationals | .307 | .354 | .496 | 22 | 80 | |
| 2017 | Buster Posey (4) | San Francisco Giants | .320 | .400 | .462 | 12 | 67 | |
| 2018 | J. T. Realmuto | Miami Marlins | .277 | .340 | .484 | 21 | 74 | |
| 2019 | J. T. Realmuto (2) | Philadelphia Phillies | .275 | .328 | .493 | 25 | 83 | |
| 2020 | Travis d'Arnaud | Atlanta Braves | .321 | .386 | .533 | 9 | 34 | |
| 2021 | Buster Posey (5) | San Francisco Giants | .304 | .390 | .499 | 18 | 56 | |
| 2022 | J. T. Realmuto (3) | Philadelphia Phillies | .276 | .342 | .478 | 22 | 84 | |
| 2023 | William Contreras | Milwaukee Brewers | .289 | .367 | .457 | 17 | 78 | |
| 2024 | William Contreras (2) | Milwaukee Brewers | .281 | .365 | .466 | 23 | 92 | |
| 2025 | Hunter Goodman | Colorado Rockies | .278 | .323 | .520 | 31 | 91 | |
| 2026 | Gabriel Moreno | Arizona Diamondbacks | .311 | .388 | .486 | 16 | 83 | |
