= Silver Slugger Award =

Major League Baseball award

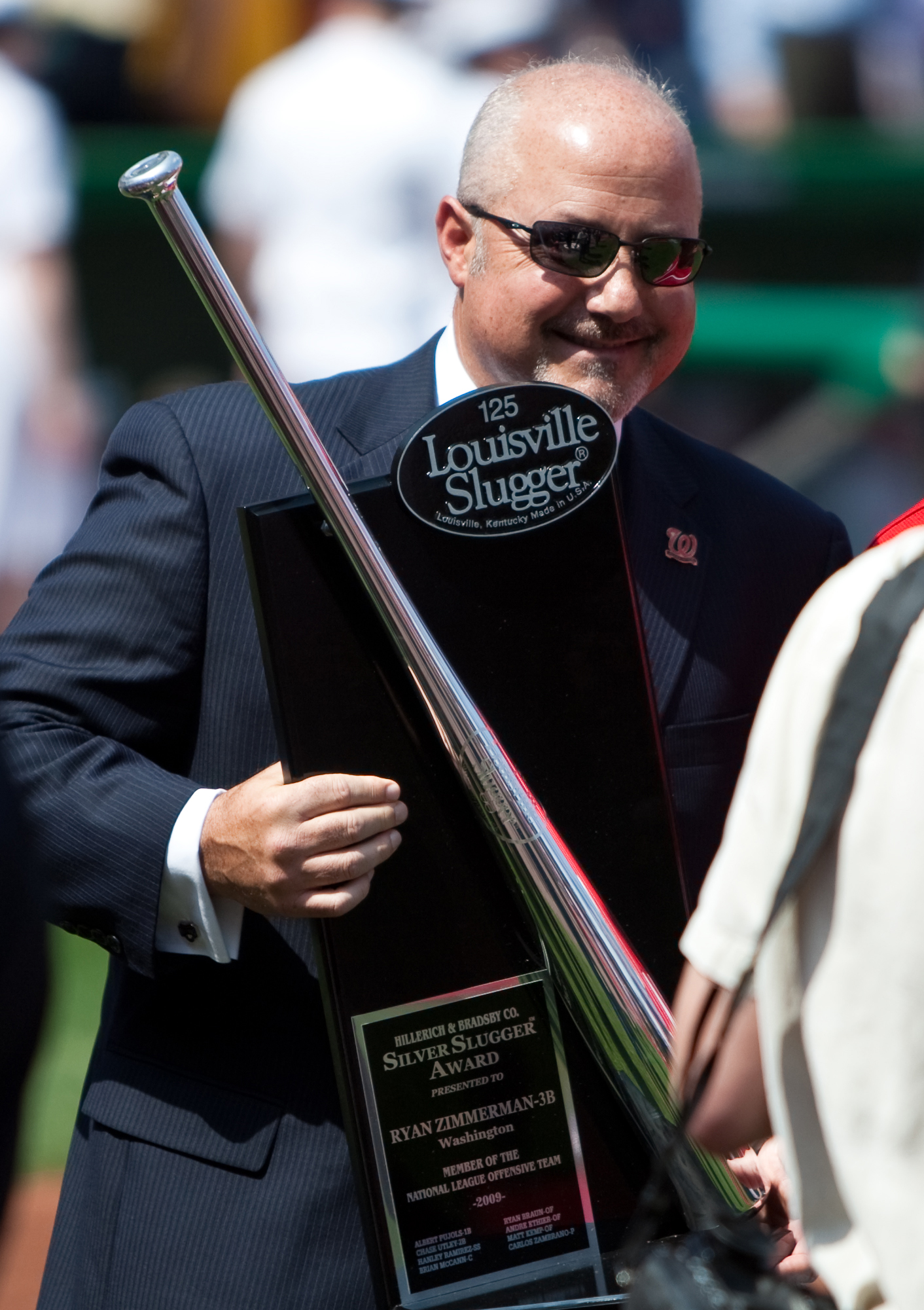
- Washington Nationals general manager Mike Rizzo holds Ryan Zimmerman's Silver Slugger Award.
- Sport: Baseball
- League: Major League Baseball
- Awarded for: Best offensive player at each position in the American League and National League
- Presented by: Hillerich & Bradsby

History
- First award: 1980

The Silver Slugger Award has been awarded annually since 1980 to the best offensive player at each position in both the American League (AL) and the National League (NL), as determined by the coaches and managers of Major League Baseball (MLB).

These voters consider several offensive statistics, including batting average, slugging percentage, and on-base percentage, as well as their "general impressions of a player's overall offensive value". They are not permitted to vote for players on their team.

The award is a bat-shaped trophy, three feet (91 cm) tall, engraved with the names of each of the winners from the league and plated with sterling silver. It is given by Hillerich & Bradsby, the manufacturer of Louisville Slugger bats.

Ten Silver Slugger Awards are given each year per league individually. One each goes to a catcher, first baseman, second baseman, third baseman, and shortstop. Three outfielders receive the award, irrespective of their specific position; for instance, three left fielders could win the award in a given year. One award goes to a designated hitter (a player who bats in place of the pitcher) and one to a utility player (a player who can play multiple fielding positions). Additionally, since 2023, a Silver Slugger is also awarded to “the best offensive team” in each league.

NL pitchers received a Silver Slugger Award each year until 2019 and in 2021. In the COVID-shortened 2020 season, MLB allowed NL teams to use a designated hitter, so an NL DH received a Silver Slugger Award for the first time. In 2022, MLB permanently allowed both leagues to use the DH. That year also saw the introduction of the Utility Player Award.

Home run record-holder Barry Bonds won 12 Silver Slugger Awards, the most of any player, and won the award in five consecutive seasons twice: from 1990 to 1994, and again from 2000 to 2004. Mike Piazza and Alex Rodriguez are tied for second, with ten each. Piazza is also the winningest catcher, having won all ten playing at the position. Rodriguez won seven Silver Sluggers as a shortstop for the Seattle Mariners and Texas Rangers, and three with the Yankees as a third baseman. Wade Boggs leads third basemen with eight awards; Barry Larkin leads shortstops with nine. Other leaders include Jose Altuve, who is tied with Ryne Sandberg (seven wins as a second baseman), Mike Hampton (five wins as a pitcher), and Paul Goldschmidt (five wins as a first baseman). David Ortiz has won seven awards as a designated hitter, the most at that position. In 2018, J. D. Martinez collected two Silver Slugger Awards: one as a designated hitter and the other as an outfielder, becoming the only player to win twice in one year. In 2021, Max Fried became the final pitcher to win a Silver Slugger Award.

== Key ==
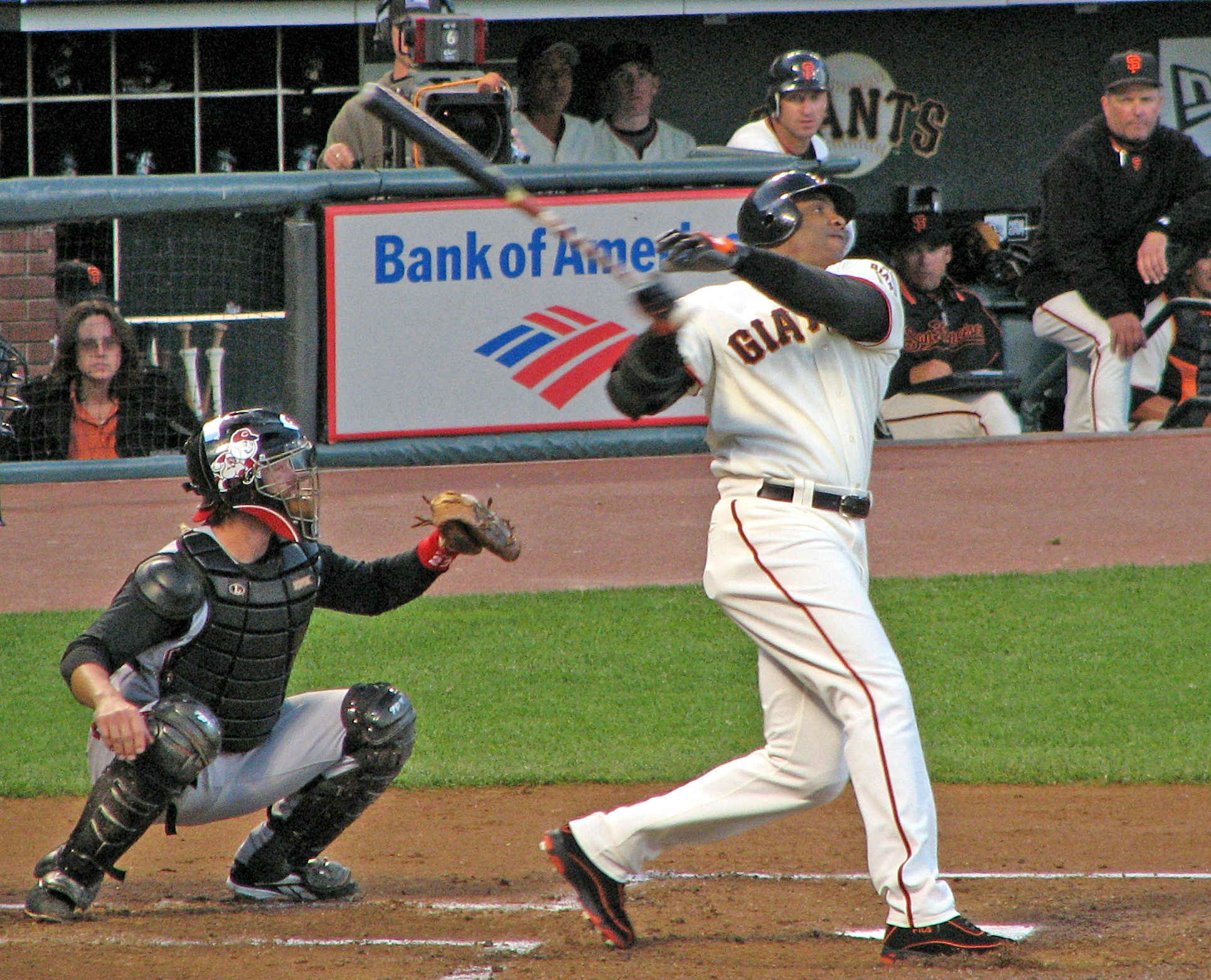
Barry Bonds (in white uniform) has won the most Silver Slugger Awards of any player, 12.

Year	Links to the corresponding Major League Baseball season
1B	First baseman (list of winners)
2B	Second baseman (list of winners)
3B	Third baseman (list of winners)
SS	Shortstop (list of winners)
OF	Outfielder (list of winners)
C	Catcher (list of winners)
P	Pitcher (list of winners)
DH	Designated hitter (list of winners)
UT	Utility player (list of winners)
*	Winner of the most Silver Slugger Awards at his position (* indicates tie)
†	Member of the National Baseball Hall of Fame and Museum

== AL winners ==
Year	1B	2B	3B	SS	OF	OF	OF	C	DH	UT	Team
1980	Cecil Cooper	Willie Randolph	George Brett^{†}	Robin Yount^{†}	Ben Oglivie	Al Oliver	Willie Wilson	Lance Parrish	Reggie Jackson^{†}	N/A	N/A
1981	Cecil Cooper	Bobby Grich	Carney Lansford	Rick Burleson	Rickey Henderson^{†}	Dave Winfield^{†}	Dwight Evans	Carlton Fisk^{†}	Al Oliver	N/A	N/A
1982	Cecil Cooper	Dámaso García	Doug DeCinces	Robin Yount^{†}	Reggie Jackson^{†}	Dave Winfield^{†}	Willie Wilson	Lance Parrish	Hal McRae	N/A	N/A
1983	Eddie Murray^{†}	Lou Whitaker	Wade Boggs^{†}	Cal Ripken Jr.^{†}	Jim Rice^{†}	Dave Winfield^{†}	Lloyd Moseby	Lance Parrish	Don Baylor	N/A	N/A
1984	Eddie Murray^{†}	Lou Whitaker	Buddy Bell	Cal Ripken Jr.^{†}	Jim Rice^{†}	Dave Winfield^{†}	Tony Armas	Lance Parrish	Andre Thornton	N/A	N/A
1985	Don Mattingly	Lou Whitaker	George Brett^{†}	Cal Ripken Jr.^{†}	Rickey Henderson^{†}	Dave Winfield^{†}	George Bell	Carlton Fisk^{†}	Don Baylor	N/A	N/A
1986	Don Mattingly	Frank White	Wade Boggs^{†}	Cal Ripken Jr.^{†}	Jesse Barfield	Kirby Puckett^{†}	George Bell	Lance Parrish	Don Baylor	N/A	N/A
1987	Don Mattingly	Lou Whitaker	Wade Boggs^{†}	Alan Trammell^{†}	Dwight Evans	Kirby Puckett^{†}	George Bell	Matt Nokes	Paul Molitor^{†}	N/A	N/A
1988	George Brett^{†}	Julio Franco	Wade Boggs^{†}	Alan Trammell^{†}	Mike Greenwell	Kirby Puckett^{†}	Jose Canseco	Carlton Fisk^{†}	Paul Molitor^{†}	N/A	N/A
1989	Fred McGriff^{†}	Julio Franco	Wade Boggs^{†}	Cal Ripken Jr.^{†}	Rubén Sierra	Kirby Puckett^{†}	Robin Yount^{†}	Mickey Tettleton	Harold Baines^{†}	N/A	N/A
1990	Cecil Fielder	Julio Franco	Kelly Gruber	Alan Trammell^{†}	Rickey Henderson^{†}	Ellis Burks	Jose Canseco	Lance Parrish	Dave Parker^{†}	N/A	N/A
1991	Cecil Fielder	Julio Franco	Wade Boggs^{†}	Cal Ripken Jr.^{†}	Joe Carter	Ken Griffey Jr.^{†}	Jose Canseco	Mickey Tettleton	Frank Thomas^{†}	N/A	N/A
1992	Mark McGwire	Roberto Alomar^{†}	Edgar Martínez^{†}	Travis Fryman	Joe Carter	Kirby Puckett^{†}	Juan González	Mickey Tettleton	Dave Winfield^{†}	N/A	N/A
1993	Frank Thomas^{†}	Carlos Baerga	Wade Boggs^{†}	Cal Ripken Jr.^{†}	Albert Belle	Ken Griffey Jr.^{†}	Juan González	Mike Stanley	Paul Molitor^{†}	N/A	N/A
1994	Frank Thomas^{†}	Carlos Baerga	Wade Boggs^{†}	Cal Ripken Jr.^{†}	Albert Belle	Ken Griffey Jr.^{†}	Kirby Puckett^{†}	Iván Rodríguez^{†}	Julio Franco	N/A	N/A
1995	Mo Vaughn	Chuck Knoblauch	Gary Gaetti	John Valentin	Albert Belle	Tim Salmon	Manny Ramirez	Iván Rodríguez^{†}	Edgar Martínez^{†}	N/A	N/A
1996	Mark McGwire	Roberto Alomar^{†}	Jim Thome^{†}	Alex Rodriguez	Albert Belle	Ken Griffey Jr.^{†}	Juan González	Iván Rodríguez^{†}	Paul Molitor^{†}	N/A	N/A
1997	Tino Martinez	Chuck Knoblauch	Matt Williams	Nomar Garciaparra	David Justice	Ken Griffey Jr.^{†}	Juan González	Iván Rodríguez^{†}	Edgar Martínez^{†}	N/A	N/A
1998	Rafael Palmeiro	Damion Easley	Dean Palmer	Alex Rodriguez	Albert Belle	Ken Griffey Jr.^{†}	Juan González	Iván Rodríguez^{†}	Jose Canseco	N/A	N/A
1999	Carlos Delgado	Roberto Alomar^{†}	Dean Palmer	Alex Rodriguez	Shawn Green	Ken Griffey Jr.^{†}	Manny Ramirez	Iván Rodríguez^{†}	Rafael Palmeiro	N/A	N/A
2000	Carlos Delgado	Roberto Alomar^{†}	Troy Glaus	Alex Rodriguez	Darin Erstad	Magglio Ordóñez	Manny Ramirez	Jorge Posada	Frank Thomas^{†}	N/A	N/A
2001	Jason Giambi	Bret Boone	Troy Glaus	Alex Rodriguez	Ichiro Suzuki^{†}	Juan González	Manny Ramirez	Jorge Posada	Edgar Martínez^{†}	N/A	N/A
2002	Jason Giambi	Alfonso Soriano	Eric Chavez	Alex Rodriguez	Garret Anderson	Magglio Ordóñez	Bernie Williams	Jorge Posada	Manny Ramirez	N/A	N/A
2003	Carlos Delgado	Bret Boone	Bill Mueller	Alex Rodriguez	Garret Anderson	Vernon Wells	Manny Ramirez	Jorge Posada	Edgar Martínez^{†}	N/A	N/A
2004	Mark Teixeira	Alfonso Soriano	Melvin Mora	Miguel Tejada	Gary Sheffield	Vladimir Guerrero^{†}	Manny Ramirez	Víctor Martínez & Iván Rodríguez^{†}	David Ortiz^{†}	N/A	N/A
2005	Mark Teixeira	Alfonso Soriano	Alex Rodriguez	Miguel Tejada	Gary Sheffield	Vladimir Guerrero^{†}	Manny Ramirez	Jason Varitek	David Ortiz^{†}	N/A	N/A
2006	Justin Morneau	Robinson Canó	Joe Crede	Derek Jeter^{†}	Jermaine Dye	Vladimir Guerrero^{†}	Manny Ramirez	Joe Mauer^{†}	David Ortiz^{†}	N/A	N/A
2007	Carlos Peña	Plácido Polanco	Alex Rodriguez	Derek Jeter^{†}	Ichiro Suzuki^{†}	Vladimir Guerrero^{†}	Magglio Ordóñez	Jorge Posada	David Ortiz^{†}	N/A	N/A
2008	Justin Morneau	Dustin Pedroia	Alex Rodriguez	Derek Jeter^{†}	Josh Hamilton	Carlos Quentin	Grady Sizemore	Joe Mauer^{†}	Aubrey Huff	N/A	N/A
2009	Mark Teixeira	Aaron Hill	Evan Longoria	Derek Jeter^{†}	Ichiro Suzuki^{†}	Jason Bay	Torii Hunter	Joe Mauer^{†}	Adam Lind	N/A	N/A
2010	Miguel Cabrera	Robinson Canó	Adrián Beltré^{†}	Alexei Ramírez	Josh Hamilton	Carl Crawford	José Bautista	Joe Mauer^{†}	Vladimir Guerrero^{†}	N/A	N/A
2011	Adrián González	Robinson Canó	Adrián Beltré^{†}	Asdrúbal Cabrera	Jacoby Ellsbury	Curtis Granderson	José Bautista	Alex Avila	David Ortiz^{†}	N/A	N/A
2012	Prince Fielder	Robinson Canó	Miguel Cabrera	Derek Jeter^{†}	Josh Hamilton	Mike Trout	Josh Willingham	A. J. Pierzynski	Billy Butler	N/A	N/A
2013	Chris Davis	Robinson Canó	Miguel Cabrera	J. J. Hardy	Adam Jones	Mike Trout	Torii Hunter	Joe Mauer^{†}	David Ortiz^{†}	N/A	N/A
2014	José Abreu	Jose Altuve^{*}	Adrián Beltré^{†}	Alexei Ramírez	José Bautista	Mike Trout	Michael Brantley	Yan Gomes	Víctor Martínez	N/A	N/A
2015	Miguel Cabrera	Jose Altuve^{*}	Josh Donaldson	Xander Bogaerts	Nelson Cruz	Mike Trout	J. D. Martinez	Brian McCann	Kendrys Morales	N/A	N/A
2016	Miguel Cabrera	Jose Altuve^{*}	Josh Donaldson	Xander Bogaerts	Mookie Betts	Mike Trout	Mark Trumbo	Salvador Pérez	David Ortiz^{†}	N/A	N/A
2017	Eric Hosmer	Jose Altuve^{*}	José Ramírez	Francisco Lindor	Aaron Judge	Justin Upton	George Springer	Gary Sánchez	Nelson Cruz	N/A	N/A
2018	José Abreu	Jose Altuve^{*}	José Ramírez	Francisco Lindor	Mookie Betts	Mike Trout	J. D. Martinez	Salvador Pérez	J. D. Martinez	N/A	N/A
2019	Carlos Santana	DJ LeMahieu	Alex Bregman	Xander Bogaerts	Mookie Betts	Mike Trout	George Springer	Mitch Garver	Nelson Cruz	N/A	N/A
2020	José Abreu	DJ LeMahieu	José Ramírez	Tim Anderson	Eloy Jiménez	Mike Trout	Teoscar Hernández	Salvador Pérez	Nelson Cruz	N/A	N/A
2021	Vladimir Guerrero Jr.	Marcus Semien	Rafael Devers	Xander Bogaerts	Aaron Judge	Cedric Mullins	Teoscar Hernández	Salvador Pérez	Shohei Ohtani	N/A	N/A
2022	Nathaniel Lowe	Jose Altuve^{*}	José Ramírez	Xander Bogaerts	Aaron Judge	Mike Trout	Julio Rodríguez	Alejandro Kirk	Yordan Alvarez	Luis Arráez	N/A
2023	Yandy Díaz	Marcus Semien	Rafael Devers	Corey Seager	Luis Robert Jr.	Kyle Tucker	Julio Rodríguez	Adley Rutschman	Shohei Ohtani	Gunnar Henderson	Texas Rangers
2024	Vladimir Guerrero Jr.	Jose Altuve^{*}	José Ramírez	Bobby Witt Jr.	Aaron Judge	Anthony Santander	Juan Soto	Salvador Pérez	Brent Rooker	Josh Smith	New York Yankees
2025	Nick Kurtz	Jazz Chisholm Jr.	José Ramírez	Bobby Witt Jr.	Aaron Judge	Byron Buxton	Riley Greene	Cal Raleigh	George Springer	Zach McKinstry	New York Yankees
2026	Pete Alonso	Chase Meidroth	Junior Caminero	Bobby Witt Jr.	Randy Arozarena	Chase DeLauter	Riley Greene	Dillon Dingler	Yordan Alvarez	Kevin McGonigle	Houston Astros

== NL winners ==
Year	1B	2B	3B	SS	OF	OF	OF	C	P	DH^	UT	Team
1980	Keith Hernandez	Manny Trillo	Mike Schmidt^{†}	Garry Templeton	Dusty Baker	Andre Dawson^{†}	George Hendrick	Ted Simmons^{†}	Bob Forsch	N/A	N/A	N/A
1981	Pete Rose	Manny Trillo	Mike Schmidt^{†}	Dave Concepción	Dusty Baker	Andre Dawson^{†}	George Foster	Gary Carter^{†}	Fernando Valenzuela	N/A	N/A	N/A
1982	Al Oliver	Joe Morgan^{†}	Mike Schmidt^{†}	Dave Concepción	Dale Murphy	Pedro Guerrero	Leon Durham	Gary Carter^{†}	Don Robinson	N/A	N/A	N/A
1983	George Hendrick	Johnny Ray	Mike Schmidt^{†}	Dickie Thon	Dale Murphy	Andre Dawson^{†}	José Cruz	Terry Kennedy	Fernando Valenzuela	N/A	N/A	N/A
1984	Keith Hernandez	Ryne Sandberg^{†*}	Mike Schmidt^{†}	Garry Templeton	Dale Murphy	Tony Gwynn^{†}	José Cruz	Gary Carter^{†}	Rick Rhoden	N/A	N/A	N/A
1985	Jack Clark	Ryne Sandberg^{†*}	Tim Wallach	Hubie Brooks	Dale Murphy	Willie McGee	Dave Parker^{†}	Gary Carter^{†}	Rick Rhoden	N/A	N/A	N/A
1986	Glenn Davis	Steve Sax	Mike Schmidt^{†}	Hubie Brooks	Tim Raines^{†}	Tony Gwynn^{†}	Dave Parker^{†}	Gary Carter^{†}	Rick Rhoden	N/A	N/A	N/A
1987	Jack Clark	Juan Samuel	Tim Wallach	Ozzie Smith^{†}	Andre Dawson^{†}	Tony Gwynn^{†}	Eric Davis	Benito Santiago	Bob Forsch	N/A	N/A	N/A
1988	Andrés Galarraga	Ryne Sandberg^{†*}	Bobby Bonilla	Barry Larkin^{†}	Darryl Strawberry	Kirk Gibson	Andy Van Slyke	Benito Santiago	Tim Leary	N/A	N/A	N/A
1989	Will Clark	Ryne Sandberg^{†*}	Howard Johnson	Barry Larkin^{†}	Kevin Mitchell	Tony Gwynn^{†}	Eric Davis	Craig Biggio^{†}	Don Robinson	N/A	N/A	N/A
1990	Eddie Murray^{†}	Ryne Sandberg^{†*}	Matt Williams	Barry Larkin^{†}	Barry Bonds	Bobby Bonilla	Darryl Strawberry	Benito Santiago	Don Robinson	N/A	N/A	N/A
1991	Will Clark	Ryne Sandberg^{†*}	Howard Johnson	Barry Larkin^{†}	Barry Bonds	Bobby Bonilla	Ron Gant	Benito Santiago	Tom Glavine^{†}	N/A	N/A	N/A
1992	Fred McGriff^{†}	Ryne Sandberg^{†*}	Gary Sheffield	Barry Larkin^{†}	Barry Bonds	Larry Walker^{†}	Andy Van Slyke	Darren Daulton	Dwight Gooden	N/A	N/A	N/A
1993	Fred McGriff^{†}	Robby Thompson	Matt Williams	Jay Bell	Barry Bonds	Lenny Dykstra	David Justice	Mike Piazza^{†}	Orel Hershiser	N/A	N/A	N/A
1994	Jeff Bagwell^{†}	Craig Biggio^{†}	Matt Williams	Wil Cordero	Barry Bonds	Tony Gwynn^{†}	Moisés Alou	Mike Piazza^{†}	Mark Portugal	N/A	N/A	N/A
1995	Eric Karros	Craig Biggio^{†}	Vinny Castilla	Barry Larkin^{†}	Sammy Sosa	Tony Gwynn^{†}	Dante Bichette	Mike Piazza^{†}	Tom Glavine^{†}	N/A	N/A	N/A
1996	Andrés Galarraga	Eric Young	Ken Caminiti	Barry Larkin^{†}	Barry Bonds	Gary Sheffield	Ellis Burks	Mike Piazza^{†}	Tom Glavine^{†}	N/A	N/A	N/A
1997	Jeff Bagwell^{†}	Craig Biggio^{†}	Vinny Castilla	Jeff Blauser	Barry Bonds	Tony Gwynn^{†}	Larry Walker^{†}	Mike Piazza^{†}	John Smoltz^{†}	N/A	N/A	N/A
1998	Mark McGwire	Craig Biggio^{†}	Vinny Castilla	Barry Larkin^{†}	Sammy Sosa	Greg Vaughn	Moisés Alou	Mike Piazza^{†}	Tom Glavine^{†}	N/A	N/A	N/A
1999	Jeff Bagwell^{†}	Edgardo Alfonzo	Chipper Jones^{†}	Barry Larkin^{†}	Sammy Sosa	Vladimir Guerrero^{†}	Larry Walker ^{†}	Mike Piazza^{†}	Mike Hampton	N/A	N/A	N/A
2000	Todd Helton^{†}	Jeff Kent^{†}	Chipper Jones^{†}	Édgar Rentería	Barry Bonds	Vladimir Guerrero^{†}	Sammy Sosa	Mike Piazza^{†}	Mike Hampton	N/A	N/A	N/A
2001	Todd Helton^{†}	Jeff Kent^{†}	Albert Pujols	Rich Aurilia	Barry Bonds	Luis Gonzalez	Sammy Sosa	Mike Piazza^{†}	Mike Hampton	N/A	N/A	N/A
2002	Todd Helton^{†}	Jeff Kent^{†}	Scott Rolen^{†}	Édgar Rentería	Barry Bonds	Vladimir Guerrero^{†}	Sammy Sosa	Mike Piazza^{†}	Mike Hampton	N/A	N/A	N/A
2003	Todd Helton^{†}	José Vidro	Mike Lowell	Édgar Rentería	Barry Bonds	Gary Sheffield	Albert Pujols	Javy López	Mike Hampton	N/A	N/A	N/A
2004	Albert Pujols	Mark Loretta	Adrián Beltré^{†}	Jack Wilson	Barry Bonds	Jim Edmonds	Bobby Abreu	Johnny Estrada	Liván Hernández	N/A	N/A	N/A
2005	Derrek Lee	Jeff Kent^{†}	Morgan Ensberg	Felipe López	Andruw Jones^{†}	Miguel Cabrera	Carlos Lee	Michael Barrett	Jason Marquis	N/A	N/A	N/A
2006	Ryan Howard	Chase Utley	Miguel Cabrera	José Reyes	Carlos Beltrán^{†}	Matt Holliday	Alfonso Soriano	Brian McCann	Carlos Zambrano	N/A	N/A	N/A
2007	Prince Fielder	Chase Utley	David Wright	Jimmy Rollins	Carlos Beltrán^{†}	Matt Holliday	Carlos Lee	Russell Martin	Micah Owings	N/A	N/A	N/A
2008	Albert Pujols	Chase Utley	David Wright	Hanley Ramírez	Ryan Ludwick	Matt Holliday	Ryan Braun	Brian McCann	Carlos Zambrano	N/A	N/A	N/A
2009	Albert Pujols	Chase Utley	Ryan Zimmerman	Hanley Ramírez	Matt Kemp	Andre Ethier	Ryan Braun	Brian McCann	Carlos Zambrano	N/A	N/A	N/A
2010	Albert Pujols	Dan Uggla	Ryan Zimmerman	Troy Tulowitzki	Carlos González	Matt Holliday	Ryan Braun	Brian McCann	Yovani Gallardo	N/A	N/A	N/A
2011	Prince Fielder	Brandon Phillips	Aramis Ramírez	Troy Tulowitzki	Matt Kemp	Justin Upton	Ryan Braun	Brian McCann	Daniel Hudson	N/A	N/A	N/A
2012	Adam LaRoche	Aaron Hill	Chase Headley	Ian Desmond	Andrew McCutchen	Jay Bruce	Ryan Braun	Buster Posey	Stephen Strasburg	N/A	N/A	N/A
2013	Paul Goldschmidt	Matt Carpenter	Pedro Álvarez	Ian Desmond	Andrew McCutchen	Jay Bruce	Michael Cuddyer	Yadier Molina	Zack Greinke	N/A	N/A	N/A
2014	Adrián González	Neil Walker	Anthony Rendon	Ian Desmond	Andrew McCutchen	Giancarlo Stanton	Justin Upton	Buster Posey	Madison Bumgarner	N/A	N/A	N/A
2015	Paul Goldschmidt	Dee Gordon	Nolan Arenado	Brandon Crawford	Andrew McCutchen	Bryce Harper	Carlos González	Buster Posey	Madison Bumgarner	N/A	N/A	N/A
2016	Anthony Rizzo	Daniel Murphy	Nolan Arenado	Corey Seager	Charlie Blackmon	Yoenis Céspedes	Christian Yelich	Wilson Ramos	Jake Arrieta	N/A	N/A	N/A
2017	Paul Goldschmidt	Daniel Murphy	Nolan Arenado	Corey Seager	Charlie Blackmon	Giancarlo Stanton	Marcell Ozuna	Buster Posey	Adam Wainwright	N/A	N/A	N/A
2018	Paul Goldschmidt	Javier Báez	Nolan Arenado	Trevor Story	Nick Markakis	David Peralta	Christian Yelich	J. T. Realmuto	Germán Márquez	N/A	N/A	N/A
2019	Freddie Freeman	Ozzie Albies	Anthony Rendon	Trevor Story	Ronald Acuña Jr.	Cody Bellinger	Christian Yelich	J. T. Realmuto	Zack Greinke	N/A	N/A	N/A
2020	Freddie Freeman	Donovan Solano	Manny Machado	Fernando Tatís Jr.	Juan Soto	Ronald Acuña Jr.	Mookie Betts	Travis d'Arnaud	N/A	Marcell Ozuna	N/A	N/A
2021	Freddie Freeman	Ozzie Albies	Austin Riley	Fernando Tatís Jr.	Juan Soto	Bryce Harper	Nick Castellanos	Buster Posey	Max Fried	N/A	N/A	N/A
2022	Paul Goldschmidt	Jeff McNeil	Nolan Arenado	Trea Turner	Kyle Schwarber	Mookie Betts	Juan Soto	J. T. Realmuto	N/A	Josh Bell	Brandon Drury	N/A
2023	Matt Olson	Luis Arráez	Austin Riley	Francisco Lindor	Ronald Acuña Jr.	Mookie Betts	Juan Soto	William Contreras	N/A	Bryce Harper	Cody Bellinger	Atlanta Braves
2024	Bryce Harper	Ketel Marte	Manny Machado	Francisco Lindor	Teoscar Hernández	Jackson Merrill	Jurickson Profar	William Contreras	N/A	Shohei Ohtani	Mookie Betts	Los Angeles Dodgers
2025	Pete Alonso	Ketel Marte	Manny Machado	Geraldo Perdomo	Corbin Carroll	Juan Soto	Kyle Tucker	Hunter Goodman	N/A	Shohei Ohtani	Alec Burleson	Los Angeles Dodgers
2026	Matt Olson	Brandon Lowe	Alex Bregman	Elly De La Cruz	Pete Crow-Armstrong	Jackson Chourio	James Wood	Gabriel Moreno	N/A	Kyle Schwarber	Jake Bauers	Chicago Cubs

(^) = A universal designated hitter rule was implemented temporarily during the 2020 MLB season and was fully implemented starting in 2022; the NL awarded its first Silver Slugger for DH in 2020. No award for pitchers was given.

== See also ==
- List of Major League Baseball awards
  - Hank Aaron Award, recognizing the best hitter in each league
  - Edgar Martínez Award, recognizing the best designated hitter
  - Gold Glove Award, the defensive equivalent of the award
- Baseball awards § United States
- Triple Crown (baseball)
- Ted Williams Museum and Hitters Hall of Fame
