= Jimmy Barrett (baseball) =

American baseball player (1875–1921)

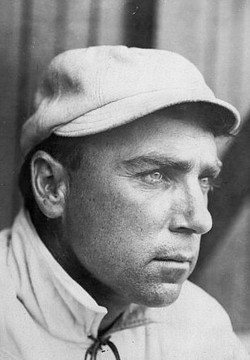
- Center fielder
- Born: March 28, 1875; Athol, Massachusetts, U.S.
- Died: October 24, 1921 (aged 46); Detroit, Michigan, U.S.
- Batted: Left Threw: Right

MLB debut
- September 13, 1899, for the Cincinnati Reds

Last MLB appearance
- May 13, 1908, for the Boston Red Sox

MLB statistics
- Batting average: .291
- Home runs: 16
- Runs batted in: 255
- Stats at Baseball Reference

Teams
- Cincinnati Reds (1899–1900); Detroit Tigers (1901–1905); Cincinnati Reds (1906); Boston Americans/Red Sox (1907–1908)

James Erigena Barrett (March 28, 1875 – October 24, 1921) was an American Major League Baseball (MLB) center fielder. A native of Athol, Massachusetts, he batted left-handed and threw right-handed. Barrett played 10 seasons in the major leagues with the Cincinnati Reds (1899–1900, 1906), Detroit Tigers (1901–05), and Boston Red Sox (1907–08). Barrett was the first star for the Tigers, playing for the Tigers in the first five years of their existence. He left the Tigers with the arrival of a new center fielder Ty Cobb. Barrett had a career batting average of .291 (21 points higher than the league average during the deadball years in which he played). He also had a career on-base percentage of .379. In 1903 and 1904, he led the American League in times on base and walks. Despite Barrett having played in only 866 major league games, baseball historian, Bill James, ranks Barrett as the 72nd best center fielder of all time.

== Early years ==
Born in Athol, Massachusetts, Barrett served in the U.S. Army from 1894 to 1896. Barrett joined the company baseball team, playing shortstop for three years.

In 1899, Barrett played for the Detroit team in the Western Association before being sold to the Cincinnati Reds in August 1899. In one month with the Reds in 1899, Barrett hit for a .370 batting average, .477 on-base percentage, and .478 slugging percentage. Barrett never matched those numbers again, but continued to be one of the better hitters of his time. In 1900, he hit .316, with a .400 on-base percentage and had career highs with 172 hits, 114 runs and 44 stolen bases (both 3rd best in the National League).

== Detroit Tigers (1901–1905) ==
In 1901, Barrett jumped to the new American League, signing with the Detroit Tigers. Barrett was the star of the Tigers team in the first five years of the franchise's history from 1901 to 1905. In 1901, Barrett was among the league leaders in the American League's inaugural season in runs scored with 110 (fifth), bases on balls with 76 (third), on-base percentage at .385 (ninth), times on base with 240 (fourth), and plate appearances with 630 (fourth).

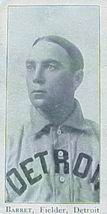
Jimmy Barrett's 1903 E107 Breisch Williams baseball card

Barrett continued to rank among the best batters in the American League each year from 1901 to 1904. His .397 on-base percentage in 1902 was fourth highest in the league. In 1903, arguably his best season, Barrett led the league with a .407 on-base percentage, 74 bases on balls, and 243 times on base.

In the 1904 season, despite a 154-game schedule, Barrett became the first major league player to appear in 162 games after Detroit set a season record with 10 tie games. His record for games played was unmatched until the schedules increased to 162 games in 1961. In 1904, Barrett also led the American League with 79 bases on balls and 249 times on base.

Barrett was also an excellent fielder. He had a strong arm and led all American League outfielders in assists in three of the first four American League seasons. From 1900 to 1904, Barrett racked up an impressive total of 126 assists, including 31 in 1901 and 29 in 1904. He also led American League outfielders in putouts in 1902 (326) and 1904 (339). His range factor score was markedly above the league average from 1900 to 1904, including 1902 when his 2.56 range factor score was 0.52 points above the league average.

During the 1903 and 1904 seasons, Barrett clashed with Detroit manager, Ed Barrow. In his autobiography, "My Fifty Years in Baseball", Barrow wrote that he never got along with Barrett. When Detroit owner, Frank Navin, blocked Barrow's efforts to trade the star center fielder, Barrow quit. Barrow wrote that, on one occasion, Barrett complained to Barrow that "your methods take all the individuality away from a ballplayer." Barrow responded, "Young man, if you ever speak to me that way again I will take more than your individuality away from you. I will knock your block off."

In 1905, Barrow was gone as the Tigers' manager, but a leg injury slowed Barrett and resulted in his appearing in only 20 games. When Ty Cobb joined the Tigers in August, Barrett faced a new threat. Detroit's new manager Bill Armour introduced Cobb to Barrett. He told Cobb that Barrett's "knee was on the bum, and I'm using you in his place in center field. Barrett was given the task of teaching Cobb the team's signs, which included a system Barrett had developed in 1905 for stealing the opponents' signs. Cobb wrote in his autobiography that the injured Barrett would sit in the center field stands with a pair of spyglasses "strong enough to pick out the fillings in the opposition catcher's teeth." Barrett would then relay the signs to the batter using markings on a fence sign advertising The Detroit News.

As Cobb proved his potential in 1905, Barrett became expendable. Barrett began to resent the young Cobb, who was a clear threat to his job. In early 1906, the Tigers sold Barrett back to the Cincinnati Reds, where he played in only five games.

== Later years ==
Barrett spent his final two seasons in the major leagues playing for the Boston Red Sox in 1907 and 1908. However, he was never the same either as a batter or a fielder. He hit .244 in 1907 and dropped to .125 in 1908. He played his final major league game on May 13, 1908. A knee injury ended his career prematurely.

He became a senior partner in the real estate firm of Barrett & Walsh in Detroit. Barrett died from "a stroke of apoplexy" (for the avoidance of doubt, apoplexy is an outdated medical term) at his office in October 1921 at age 46. He was buried in Detroit's Mount Olivet Cemetery.
