= List of Silver Slugger Award winners as a utility player =

The Silver Slugger Award is awarded annually to the best offensive player at each position in both the American League (AL) and the National League (NL), as determined by the coaches and managers of Major League Baseball (MLB). These voters consider several offensive categories in selecting the winners, including batting average, slugging percentage, and on-base percentage, in addition to "coaches' and managers' general impressions of a player's overall offensive value". Managers and coaches are not permitted to vote for players on their own team. The Silver Slugger was first awarded in 1980 and is given by Hillerich & Bradsby, the manufacturer of Louisville Slugger bats. The award is a bat-shaped trophy, 3 feet (91 cm) tall, engraved with the names of each of the winners from the league and plated with sterling silver.

In 2022, Major League Baseball began awarding a Silver Slugger Award to utility players (i.e. players who played multiple fielding positions in a given season).

== Key ==
Year	Links to the corresponding Major League Baseball season
AVG	Batting average
OBP	On-base percentage
SLG	Slugging percentage
HR	Home runs
RBI	Runs batted in
Ref	References
* or **	Winner of the most Silver Slugger Awards at his position (** indicates tie)
†	Member of the National Baseball Hall of Fame and Museum

== American League winners ==
Year	Player	Team	AVG	OBP	SLG	HR	RBI	Ref
2022	Luis Arráez**	Minnesota Twins	.316	.375	.420	8	49	
2023	Gunnar Henderson**	Baltimore Orioles	.255	.325	.489	28	82	
2024	Josh Smith**	Texas Rangers	.258	.337	.394	13	62	
2025	Zach McKinstry**	Detroit Tigers	.259	.333	.438	12	49	
2026	Kevin McGonigle**	Detroit Tigers	.278	.376	.430	18	72	

== National League winners ==
Year	Player	Team	AVG	OBP	SLG	HR	RBI	Ref
2022	Brandon Drury**	Cincinnati Reds; San Diego Padres	.263	.320	.492	28	87	
2023	Cody Bellinger**	Chicago Cubs	.307	.356	.525	26	97	
2024	Mookie Betts**	Los Angeles Dodgers	.289	.372	.491	19	75	
2025	Alec Burleson**	St. Louis Cardinals	.290	.343	.459	18	69	
2026	Jake Bauers**	Milwaukee Brewers	.266	.389	.484	26	86	

== See also ==
- List of Gold Glove Award winners as a utility player
