= Eddie Lake =

American baseball player (1916–1995)

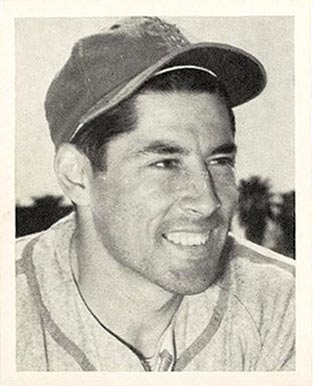
- Shortstop
- Born: March 18, 1916; Antioch, California, U.S.
- Died: June 7, 1995 (aged 79); Castro Valley, California, U.S.
- Batted: Right Threw: Right

MLB debut
- September 26, 1939, for the St. Louis Cardinals

Last MLB appearance
- September 30, 1950, for the Detroit Tigers

MLB statistics
- Batting average: .231
- Home runs: 39
- Runs batted in: 193
- Stats at Baseball Reference

Teams
- St. Louis Cardinals (1939–1941); Boston Red Sox (1943–1945); Detroit Tigers (1946–1950)

Career highlights and awards
- Led AL in on-base percentage (1945)

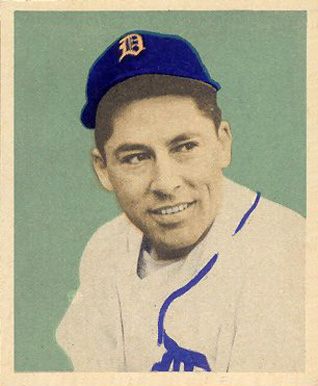
Eddie Lake's 1949 Bowman baseball card

Edward Erving Lake (March 18, 1916 – June 7, 1995), nicknamed "Sparky," was an American professional baseball player from 1937 through 1956. A shortstop, he appeared in 835 games in the Major Leagues over 11 seasons with the St. Louis Cardinals (1939–1941), Boston Red Sox (1943–1945), and Detroit Tigers (1946–1950).

Over his MLB career, Lake compiled only a .231 batting average, but with his ability to draw bases on balls, Lake had a career on-base percentage of .366 — 135 points higher than his batting average. His 1945 on-base percentage of .412 with the Red Sox led the American League. Lake had over 100 bases on balls in three consecutive seasons. His walk totals were 106 in 1945 (second best in the AL); 103 in 1946 (third in the AL), and 120 in 1947 (third in the AL). He was also four best in the AL in times hit by pitcher in 1946 with four.

Lake was also a solid fielder, leading AL shortstops in assists and double plays in 1945. For the 1945 season, Lake collected 265 putouts, 459 assists, and 112 double plays. His range factor was 5.57 — 63 points above the league average for shortstops. Traded by the Red Sox to the Tigers on January 3, 1946 for first baseman Rudy York, Lake scored 105 runs in his first season for the Tigers in 1946, while York helped lead Boston to its first American League pennant in 28 years.
