= Matt Nokes =

American baseball player (born 1963)

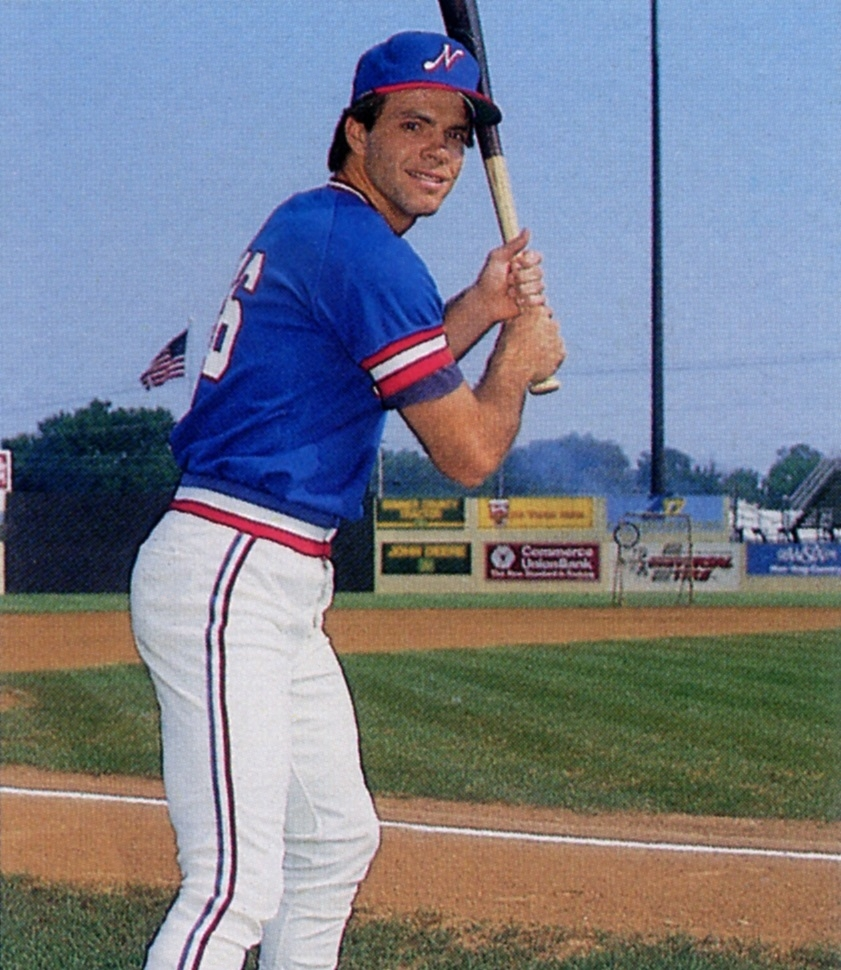
- Nokes with the Nashville Sounds in 1986
- Catcher
- Born: October 31, 1963 (age 62); San Diego, California, U.S.
- Batted: Left Threw: Right

MLB debut
- September 3, 1985, for the San Francisco Giants

Last MLB appearance
- September 27, 1995, for the Colorado Rockies

MLB statistics
- Batting average: .254
- Home runs: 136
- Runs batted in: 422
- Stats at Baseball Reference

Teams
- San Francisco Giants (1985); Detroit Tigers (1986–1990); New York Yankees (1990–1994); Baltimore Orioles (1995); Colorado Rockies (1995)

Career highlights and awards
- All-Star (1987); Silver Slugger Award (1987)

Matthew Dodge Nokes (born October 31, 1963) is an American former professional baseball catcher and designated hitter. He played 11 seasons in Major League Baseball for the San Francisco Giants (1985), the Detroit Tigers (1986–1990), New York Yankees (1990–1994), the Baltimore Orioles, and the Colorado Rockies (1995). Nokes batted left-handed and threw right-handed. He also had experience at first base, third base, and left and right fields.

== Playing career ==
Nokes was drafted by the Giants in the 20th round of the 1981 amateur draft. He debuted in the major leagues on September 3, 1985, against the visiting Philadelphia Phillies, collecting two hits in four at bats. In 1987, his rookie year, he had his finest statistical season, batting .289, hitting 32 home runs, (at the time a record for a rookie catcher) and driving in 87 runs. In that year, he was elected to the American League All-Star Game roster, won the Silver Slugger Award, selected to the Topps Rookie All-Star team, and finished third in voting for the American League Rookie of the Year award. He was also named the Tigers Rookie of The Year by the Detroit Sports Media Association.

Following his major league career, Nokes played for the St. Paul Saints of the Northern League in 1998 and 1999, with a brief two-game stint with the Cafeteros de Córdoba of the Mexican League. He spent 2001 as a player/coach for the Schaumburg Flyers and managed the Joliet Jackhammers of the Northern League in 2002 and 2003.

After retirement from professional baseball, Nokes returned to his hometown San Diego area, where he currently owns an instructional consultation practice for serious hitters and advises software and equipment companies.

While with the Yankees, Nokes caught Jim Abbott's no-hitter on September 4, 1993.

== Plane incident ==
On February 19, 2000, Nokes, who had just signed a minor league contract with the Cleveland Indians, was forced to land a plane he was piloting on Interstate 15 in northern San Diego County. Nokes said that the plane lost oil pressure and that he could not reach an airport.

"I went south, hovered over some cars, and waited until they cleared", he said.

Nokes later sold the plane. On April 2, 2016, the man he sold it to, Dennis Hogge, crash landed it on the same highway. The plane struck a vehicle that had stopped on the side of the road, killing a passenger in that vehicle and injuring five others, including Hogge.

== Career statistics ==
| Years | Games | PA | AB | R | H | 2B | 3B | HR | RBI | BB | SO | AVG | OBP | SLG | FLD% |
| 11 | 902 | 2997 | 2735 | 310 | 695 | 96 | 4 | 136 | 422 | 200 | 395 | .254 | .308 | .441 | .990 |

Nokes' only postseason appearance was in the 1987 American League Championship Series, during which he batted .143 (2-for-14) with 1 home run and 2 RBI.

| Preceded by Andy Allanson | Topps Rookie All-Star Catcher; 1987 | Succeeded by Damon Berryhill |
