= Dillon Dingler =

American baseball player (born 1998)

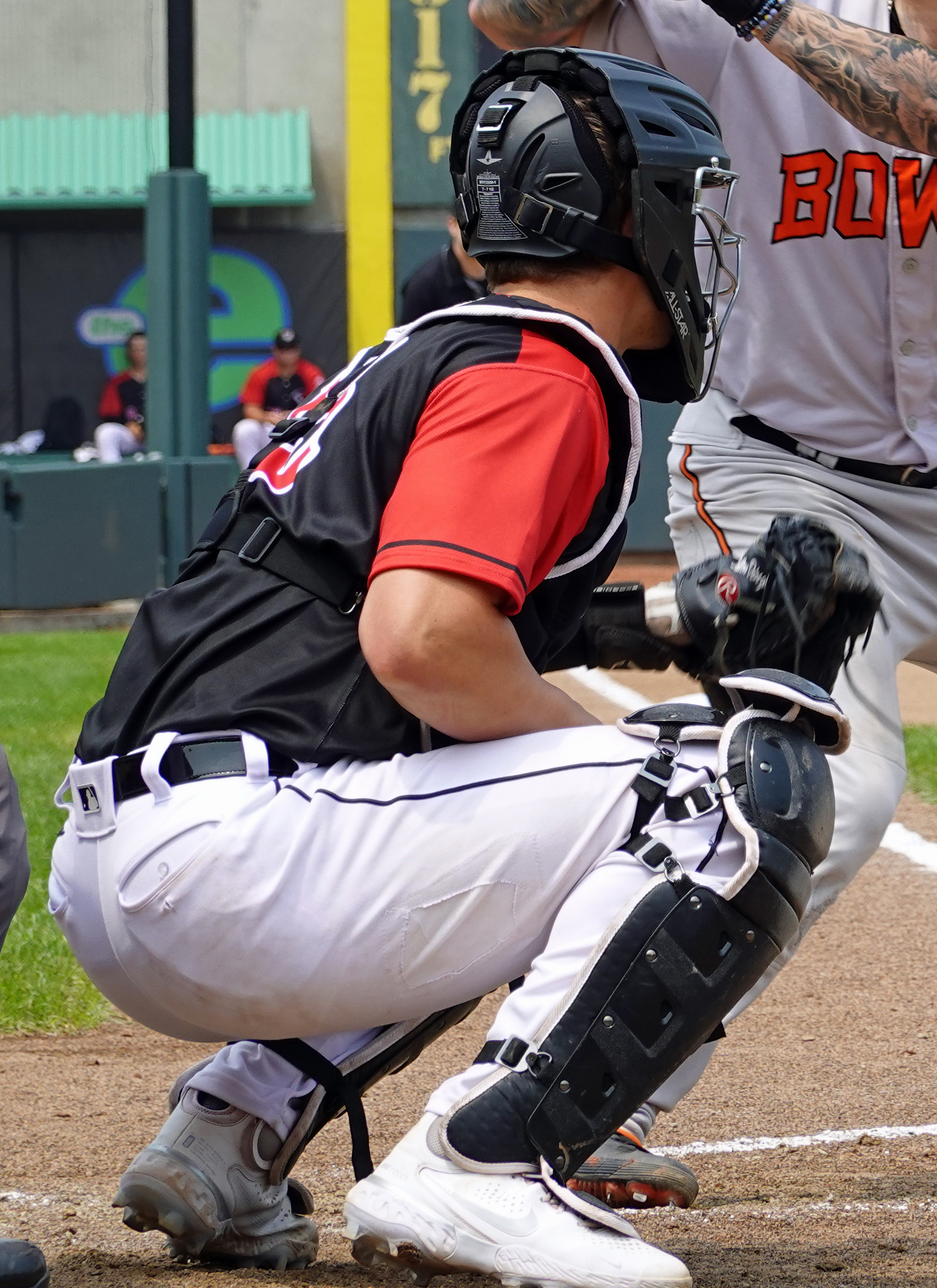
- Dingler with the Erie SeaWolves in 2021

Detroit Tigers – No. 13
- Catcher
- Born: September 17, 1998 (age 28); Massillon, Ohio, U.S.
- Bats: Right Throws: Right

MLB debut
- July 29, 2024, for the Detroit Tigers

MLB statistics (through 2026 season)
- Batting average: .251
- Home runs: 41
- Runs batted in: 159
- Stats at Baseball Reference

Teams
- Detroit Tigers (2024–present)

Career highlights and awards
- All-Star (2026); 2× Gold Glove Award (2025, 2026); Silver Slugger Award (2026)

Francis Dillon Dingler (born September 17, 1998) is an American professional baseball catcher for the Detroit Tigers of Major League Baseball (MLB). He made his MLB debut in 2024, and won a Gold Glove Award in 2025. Dingler was named to his first All-Star game in 2026.

== Amateur career ==
Dingler attended Jackson High School in Jackson Township, Ohio, where he played baseball, basketball, and football, leading Jackson to state championships in both basketball and baseball his senior year. He was teammates with fellow major leaguer Kyle Nicolas. Undrafted in the 2017 Major League Baseball draft, he enrolled at Ohio State University where he played college baseball for the Ohio State Buckeyes.

As a freshman at Ohio State in 2018, Dingler batted .244 with four home runs and 17 RBI over 53 games. He earned Big Ten Conference All-Freshman honors. After the season, he played collegiate summer baseball for the Chillicothe Paints of the Prospect League, and he was named the league's Top Pro Prospect. In 2019, his sophomore year, he was named a team captain. He missed 19 games during the season due to a broken hamate bone in his left hand. Over 49 games, he slashed .291/.392/.424 with three home runs and 19 RBI, and was named to the All-Big Ten second team. As a junior in 2020, Dingler was named a team captain for the second consecutive season. He hit .340 with five home runs and 14 RBI over 13 games before the college baseball season was cut short due to the COVID-19 pandemic.

== Professional career ==
=== Minor leagues ===
The Detroit Tigers selected Dingler in the second round, with the 38th overall pick in the 2020 Major League Baseball draft. He signed for $1.93 million. He did not play a minor league game in 2020 due to the cancellation of the minor league season because of the COVID-19 pandemic. To begin the 2021 season, he was assigned to the West Michigan Whitecaps of the High-A Central. After slashing .287/.376/.549 with eight home runs and 24 RBI over 32 games, he was promoted to the Erie SeaWolves of the Double-A Northeast on June 13. In early August, he was placed on the injured list with a finger injury. He returned to play in early September. Over 50 games with Erie, Dingler batted .202/.264/.314 with four home runs and twenty RBI. He returned to Erie for the 2022 season. He was selected to represent the Tigers at the 2022 All-Star Futures Game. Over 107 games with Erie, Dingler slashed .238/.333/.419 with 14 home runs, 58 RBI, and 22 doubles. He was selected to play in the Arizona Fall League for the Salt River Rafters after the season.

On March 16, 2023, it was reported that Dingler would be out for four weeks after undergoing a meniscectomy procedure on his right knee. After hitting .253 with 9 home runs and 41 RBI in 51 games for Double–A Erie, Dingler was promoted to the Triple–A Toledo Mud Hens in August 15. In 26 games for Toledo, he hit .202 with three home runs and nine RBI.

On November 14, 2023, the Tigers added Dingler to their 40-man roster to protect him from the Rule 5 draft. He was optioned to Triple–A Toledo to begin the 2024 season. Over 71 games with Toledo, he hit .308 with 17 home runs and 52 RBI.

=== Major leagues ===
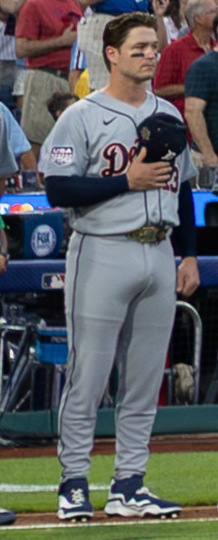
Dingler at the 2026 MLB All-Star Game.

On July 29, 2024, Dingler was promoted to the major leagues for the first time. Dingler's first career hit was an RBI double on July 29, 2024 against the Cleveland Guardians. Dingler hit his first career home run on August 11 against the San Francisco Giants. Dingler batted .167/.195/.310 with one home run and 11 RBI in the 2024 season with the Tigers.

Dingler started the 2025 season with Detroit splitting time with 2024 starting catcher Jake Rogers. Rogers was placed on the injured list and when he returned, Dingler's positive performance (.289 batting average, plus-6 Defensive Runs Saved rating as of May 29) allowed him to remain the starter, catching approximately twice as often as Rogers. Dingler led the 2025 Tigers with a .278 batting average, while adding 13 home runs and 57 RBI. Behind the plate, he had zero passed balls and threw out 31.7 percent of potential base stealers, first in the AL among catchers with a minimum of 50 SB attempts and well above the league average of 21.5 percent. On November 2, 2025, Dingler was awarded his first career Gold Glove Award for American League catchers. He is the first Tiger player to win a Gold Glove since Ian Kinsler in 2016, and the first Tiger catcher to win the award since Iván Rodríguez in 2007.

Prior to the 2026 season, Dingler underwent arthoscopic surgery and began his play at spring training by participating in a throwing program and catching bullpen sessions. In a June 9, 2026 game against the Minnesota Twins, Dingler had four hits and 11 total bases, including two home runs. This gave him 16 home runs, the most by a Tiger catcher through the first 60 games played in a season since Rudy York in 1938.

On July 4, 2026, Dingler was selected as a reserve catcher for the 2026 American League All-Star team. At the time of his selection, he was hitting .269 with 19 home runs and 59 RBI, while leading all AL catchers with a 3.9 fWAR (per Fangraphs). Dingler slumped after the All-Star break, and from August 1 onward, he hit .186 (32-for-172). He finished the season hitting .243, with a team-leading 27 home runs and 91 RBI. After the season, he was awarded his second consecutive Gold Glove. On November 17, Dingler was awarded his first AL Silver Slugger Award at the catching position.
