= Tom Gage (journalist) =

American sportswriter (born 1948)

- Born: April 2, 1948 (age 78); Detroit, Michigan
- Occupation: Sportswriter
- Spouse: Lisa
- Children: J.T.
- Writing career
- Notable awards: J. G. Taylor Spink Award (2015)

Tom Gage (born April 2, 1948) is an American sportswriter who worked for The Detroit News as the Detroit Tigers beat writer from 1979 to 2015. Gage was awarded the J. G. Taylor Spink Award in 2015.

== Education ==
Gage is a graduate of Washington & Lee University.

== Career ==
Gage began his career at The Times-Picayune in the early 1970s before moving to The Detroit News in 1976. Gage spent 39 years on the News sports staff, and 36 years as the Tigers beat writer, until retiring from the paper in March 2015, after being reassigned from the beat a month prior.

Following his retirement from The Detroit News in March 2015, it was announced that Gage was hired as a columnist for Fox Sports Detroit, where he began writing commentary and analysis of the Tigers from their spring training complex. His job at Fox Sports Detroit only lasted three months, when Fox Sports dismissed all of their regional web sportswriters on June 30, 2015.

Gage was awarded the J. G. Taylor Spink Award in 2015 by Baseball Writers' Association of America, in the closest balloting in the history of the award. Gage received 167 votes of the record 463 ballots cast, while late columnist Furman Bisher of The Atlanta Journal-Constitution received 161 votes. On June 13, 2016, Gage was honored by the Michigan Jewish Sports Foundation with the Dick Schaap Award for Media Excellence at its 26th Annual Hank Greenberg Memorial Golf Invitational. On September 9, 2016, Gage was inducted into the Michigan Sports Hall of Fame in Detroit, Michigan.

In 2024, Gage co-wrote The Enchanted Season (with Lance Parrish) about the 1984 Detroit Tigers.
