= 1989 Detroit Tigers season =

Major League Baseball season

1989 Detroit Tigers
- League: American League
- Division: East
- Ballpark: Tiger Stadium
- City: Detroit, Michigan
- Record: 59–103 (.364)
- Divisional place: 7th
- Owners: Tom Monaghan
- General managers: Bill Lajoie
- Managers: Sparky Anderson
- Television: WDIV-TV (George Kell, Al Kaline); PASS (Larry Osterman, Jim Northrup)
- Radio: WJR (Ernie Harwell, Paul Carey)

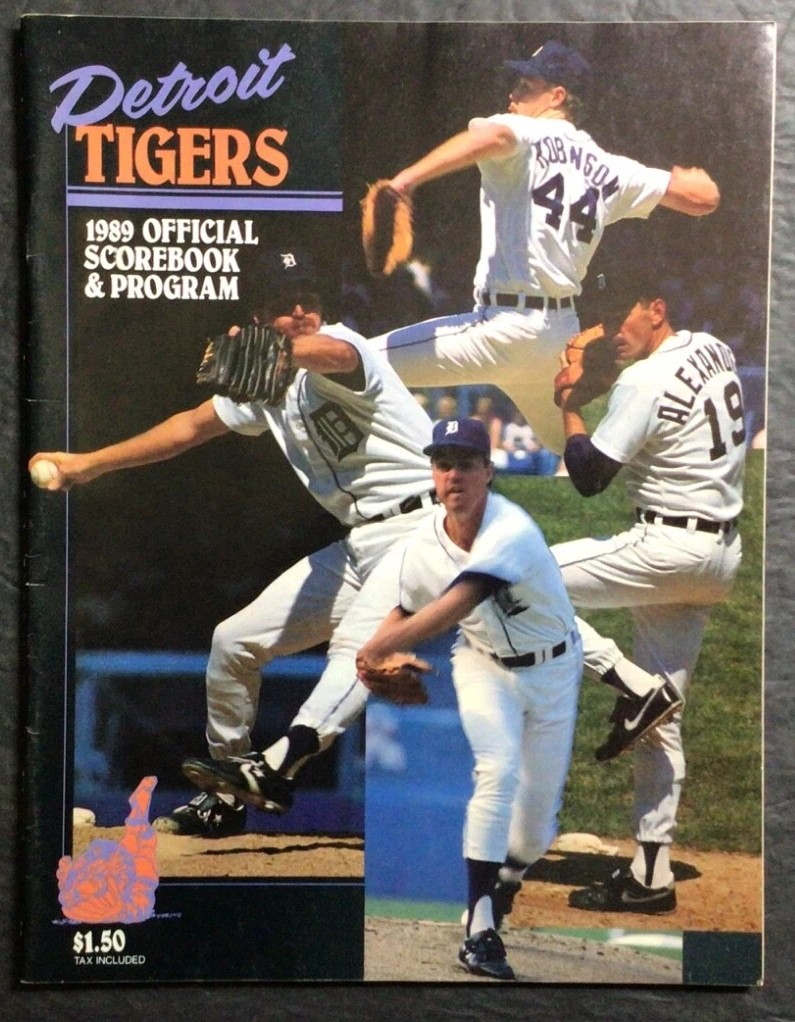
1989 Scorebook featuring the starting pitchers of the Detroit Tigers. Shown are (clockwise): Jeff Robinson, Doyle Alexander, Frank Tanana and Jack Morris. This item was sold exclusively at Tiger Stadium in Detroit, Michigan.

The 1989 Detroit Tigers season was the team's 89th season and the 78th season at Tiger Stadium. The Tigers finished 59–103 and in last place in the American League East. It was the team's first losing season since 1977, the worst record in the Major Leagues, as well as (at the time) the franchise's second-worst season ever in terms of both losses (103) and win percentage (.364). It was also (at the time) the franchise's worst full 162-game season (those marks would be surpassed in 1996, 2003, and 2019).

== Offseason Roster Moves at a glance ==
- October 28, 1988: Walt Terrell was traded by the Tigers to the San Diego Padres for Chris Brown and Keith Moreland.
- November 4, 1988: Darrell Evans was granted free agency. Larry Herndon was released by the Detroit Tigers.
- November 16, 1988: Ray Knight was released by the Tigers.
- November 30, 1988: Randy Bockus was signed as a free agent with the Detroit Tigers.
- January 13, 1989: Doyle Alexander was signed as a free agent by the Tigers.
- February 22, 1989: Mark Huismann was released by the Tigers.
- March 23, 1989: Tom Brookens was traded by the Tigers to the New York Yankees for Charles Hudson.
- March 23, 1989: Eric King was traded by the Tigers to the Chicago White Sox for Kenny Williams.

== Offseason News ==
January 17: While on the team's annual midseason bus tour throughout the state of Michigan, Sparky Anderson compares new acquisition Chris Brown to former Cincinnati Reds star Joe Morgan: "I once had a player named Joe Morgan who had the same kind of stories following him. Seven years later, I asked Joe if he tricked me. He said 'No, you tricked me Sparky. You lockered me next to Pete Rose.'" Sparky was referring to the concerns over Brown's previous injuries and playing time and the speculation that he would locker next to Tigers' star Alan Trammell.

February 17: Even though many preseason publications pick the Tigers for the second division, Sparky Anderson remains optimistic. "We'll be in there again," said Anderson, referring to the Tigers' 1987 AL East title and second-place showing in 1988 despite similar predictions from the media. "They better play good baseball because we're going to."

February 21: Manager Sparky Anderson tells the media that his roster is "set" for the 1989 season. When asked if he will bring a little-known player to the major league roster for Opening Day, Anderson says "I can't see doing that this year."

February 24: As the Tigers prepare for their first Spring Training game, shortstop Alan Trammell is asked about the team's chances in 1989. The consensus is that the Tigers will not contend for a pennant: "We like it that way. Nobody's looking over our shoulder all the time and aiming for us and we know deep down inside that we can win it all." Trammell elaborated to say that in his view, six teams had a legitimate shot to win the American League East.

== Spring Training ==
March 1: Manager Sparky Anderson confirms his intention to bat veteran second baseman Lou Whitaker third in the batting lineup for the upcoming season.

Newly acquired third baseman Chris Brown reports to camp 30 pounds over his playing weight. Speculation begins that he will not be able to take it off by Opening Day.

March 3: The Tigers win their first spring training game a 6–4 victory over the Chicago White Sox. Matt Nokes and Torey Lovullo both homer, in support of victor Eric King, who pitched three innings of relief. Jack Morris started and allowed one-hit over three innings and Guillermo Hernandez earned the save.

March 4: Shortstop Alan Trammell signs the richest contract in team history, a three-year, $6.4 million deal. Trammell negotiated the deal with General Manager Bill Lajoie without the help of an agent.

March 12: The first telecast of the 1989 season came when the Tigers played the Texas Rangers at Joker Marchant Stadium in Lakeland, Florida. George Kell and Al Kaline were the announcers. WDIV had changed their opening graphics and music with this airing and discontinued referring to the year in their opening graphics. Instead of following the previous pattern calling the broadcast "Tigers '89", they were now designated as "Tiger Baseball Network".

March 15: Despite losing to the Texas Rangers and Nolan Ryan 4–1, a confident manager Sparky Anderson tells the media, "If we stay healthy, we can win it. We're going to be good. We'll be in the thick of things. They're picking us for fifth again. That'll be enough to let me look smart."

March 16: Owner Tom Monaghan announces his support for a new open-air stadium that would remain in Detroit. A consulting firm based in Kansas City, Missouri, provided several options, also including renovations of Tiger Stadium and a new retractable dome option.

March 21: Centerfielder Gary Pettis jammed his thumb trying to steal second during the Tigers' 6–3 victory over the Boston Red Sox. Pettis, who was also slated to start the season as the Tigers' leadoff hitter, would go on to miss the first month and a half with the injury.

March 23: The Tigers make three separate trades with the stated goal to address an aging roster. Long-time fan favorite Tom Brookens is traded to the New York Yankees for pitcher Charles Hudson. Brookens, 35, and his teammates were surprised by the trade and was quoted as saying the he "spent more time in limbo than some dancers." Teammate Jack Morris was incensed, telling the media "they (Tiger management) talk about loyalty. They crapped on Tommy for nine years, then they trade him." Alan Trammell was more philosophical saying, "I thought in the back of my mind he'd be a Tiger all his life. That's gone now."

The other trades saw pitcher Eric King traded to the Chicago White Sox for outfielder Kenny Williams and utility player Luis Salazar traded to the San Diego Padres for infielder Mike Brumley. King, 24, apparently, was in Tiger manager Sparky Anderson's doghouse for a subpar 1988 season, despite pitching very well during spring training (3–0, 1.96 ERA). King was quoted as saying "Obviously, I made someone mad in this organization and I couldn't change it."

Anderson claimed at the time that Williams, 25 was "key" despite hitting .147 during spring training at the time of the trade. Salazar, 33, had a strong first half of the 1988 season with Detroit, and played seven different positions, but Brumley, 25, was considered a younger switch-hitting version.

General Manager Bill Lajoie said the trade "gives us some added speed and also adds youth to the roster. We'll now start the season with a balanced club. Williams and Brumley are every scout's dream. They're young players with tools."

March 27: In a surprise announcement, Torey Lovullo is named the Opening Day first baseman by manager Sparky Anderson. Lovullo, a 24-year old switch hitting rookie, wins the job due his versatility (he plays all four infield positions in Spring Training) and a prolonged slump by veteran Keith Moreland, who was expected to be the first baseman after being traded for Walt Terrell. When Spring Training began, the general consensus was the Tiger roster was set. This announcement, along with Anderson's insistence that Lovullo was "the new heart of the lineup" and get 500 at-bats in the upcoming season was newsworthy.

Veteran outfielder Dwayne Murphy was released. With the acquisition of Kenny Williams and a strong spring showing by the younger Billy Bean, the 34-year old Murphy was expendable, despite hitting .300 in Spring Training.

March 31: The Tigers announce their Opening Day roster:

Pitchers: Doyle Alexander, Dave Beard, Paul Gibson, Mike Henneman, Guillermo Hernandez, Charles Hudson, Jack Morris, Jeff Robinson, Frank Tanana, Frank Williams

Catchers: Mike Heath, Matt Nokes

Infielders: Billy Bean, Dave Bergman, Chris Brown, Mike Brumley, Torey Lovullo, Keith Moreland, Al Pedrique, Alan Trammell, Lou Whitaker

Outfielders: Chet Lemon, Fred Lynn, Pat Sheridan, Ken Williams

April 1: The Tigers defeat the Boston Red Sox 4–2 in Lakeland to finish the Grapefruit League season 15–16–1.

== Regular season ==
=== April ===
April 4: Before the largest Opening Day crowd in Texas Rangers' history, the Tigers are shut out by Charlie Hough 4–0. The Tigers never really get their offense going, collecting only five hits. It is the first time the Tigers are shut out on Opening Day since 1975. Chet Lemon has the first hit of the Tigers' season and Jack Morris takes the loss. Morris tied the American League record with his tenth consecutive Opening Day start. He would go on to set the Major League record with 14 straight Opening Day assignments, breaking the record of Robin Roberts of the Philadelphia Phillies.

Before the game, the first pitch is delivered by at the time recently fired Dallas Cowboys coach Tom Landry. Landry is joined by the new ownership of the Rangers, headed by George W. Bush.

April 7: The Tigers win their first home game of the season, a 10–3 rout of the Milwaukee Brewers before 51,473 fans at Tiger Stadium. Doyle Alexander earns the victory in the home opener, displaying a knuckleball he developed during Spring Training. The Tigers scored eight runs in the seventh and eighth innings and were led by Matt Nokes (2 run homer) and Kenny Williams (2 clutch hits and 3 RBI). Manager Sparky Anderson won his 1700th game as a manager, making him only the 10th manager at the time to reach that plateau.

April 9: The Tigers have their first cancellation of the season as their game against Milwaukee is postponed. The game is rescheduled as part of a doubleheader on August 7 due to cold temperatures and snow flurries.

April 12: Despite the team's worst start in nine years and hitting a collective .202, manager Sparky Anderson tells the media "We've got the most wins in baseball during the 80s. How can you lead baseball for nine years and the get off to a slow start one year and have people start panicking? Come October, we'll be there."

April 14: The Tigers fall into last place in the American League East following their 4–2 loss to the Texas Rangers. Despite this, the Tigers are only 2 games out in the American League East as no team in the division has a winning record.

April 17: With the Tigers in last place with a 2–7 record, there is only 3 games difference from first to last place in the American League East. Sparky Anderson tells the media, "Nobody else is doing anything. But if we keep going on like this, we'll get separated from the others."

April 20: A frustrated Jack Morris complains to Minnesota reporters after the Tigers 7-2 loss at the Metrodome. Morris blames the poor start on the trades the team made in Spring Training and the loss of several veteran ballplayers. When the comments make their way to Detroit, Morris refuses to speak to the local media.

April 21: The Tigers lose to the Milwaukee Brewers 2–1 at County Stadium to see their record drop to 3–10 on the season. Jack Morris is the hard luck loser, and his record falls to 0–4. It is only the second time in Morris' career that he is four games under .500. Even with the poor start to the season and batting only .221 as a team, the Tigers are still only 3.5 games out of first place in the lowly AL East.

April 23: Outfielder/DH Gary Ward, released by the New York Yankees, is signed by the Tigers. Ward appeared in eight games with New York and batted .294. To make room for the 35-year old former All Star, infielder Billy Bean is optioned to Toledo.

April 24: At Tiger Stadium, the Tigers edge the Seattle Mariners 1-0, marking the teams' only 1-0 victory of the season. Doyle Alexander outduels Mark Langston to earn the victory raising his record to 3-0 on the season. The Tigers have won three straight and are two games out of first in the AL East. Future Hall of Famer Ken Griffey Jr. makes his first ever appearance in Detroit, singling in his first appearance, and going 2-2 with a walk.

April 30: The Tigers end the month in 6th place in the American League East with an 8–14 record, a half-game ahead of the Toronto Blue Jays in last place. The team bats .233 for the month and scores 78 runs in 22 games. The leading hitters are Mike Heath .357 and Chet Lemon at .316. Matt Nokes and Lou Whitaker lead the team with 5 home runs each.

On the pitching side, the team ends April with a 4.14 ERA and are led by Doyle Alexander who sports a 3–1 record and 2.29 ERA. Staff ace Jack Morris finishes the month 0–5, the first time in his career he lost five consecutive decisions. Willie Hernandez saves 5 games but sports an ERA of 4.70.

=== May ===
May 1: The Seattle Mariners rally, scoring three runs in the 7th inning to defeat the Tigers 5-3. Tigers' pitcher Jack Morris falls to 0-6; the first Tiger pitcher to lose his first six starts since Ted Gray in 1953. The loss leaves the Tigers with an 8-15 record, worst in Major League Baseball.

May 3: At the Kingdome, the Tigers are swept in the three-game series, losing the finale 3-2 to the Mariners. The Tigers 8-17 start is their worst 25 game start since 1953 when they were 6-19. It is also the first time the team was seve games under .500 since 1977, and their worst road trip (1-7) since 1975.

May 5: The Tigers return to Detroit to begin a homestand against Oakland. Before the game, hitting coach Vada Pinson is the subject to scrutiny with the team in last place and batting a league-worst .230. It is suggested that a broken VCR is preventing hitters from studying techniques. Pinson tells the media "In my day we didn't have VCRs. We took extra hitting."

May 8: The California Angels visit Detroit, bringing with them two players with Michigan ties. Former Tiger Lance Parrish returned to Tiger Stadium for the first time since 1986. He mentions that he was hoping to have been traded to the Tigers prior to the season and be the Tigers first baseman. Flint's Jim Abbott, in his rookie season, makes his first visit to Detroit and is the victim of a Bert Blyleven hotfoot. The Angels defeat the Tigers 9-2 to drop Detroit to 11 games under .500 for the first time since 1977.

May 10: Detroit loses to the California Angels 5-1 to drop to 9-21, their worst start since 1953. Chet Lemon is sidelined with stomach issues, Torey Luvullo is missing time with sore knees and Ken Williams has sore ribs. Chris Brown has missed all but 12 of the Tigers 30 games thus far. Sparky Anderson admits to the media that the losing is beginning to take its toll on him.

May 11: The Tigers travel to Toledo, Ohio for an exhibition game against their AAA minor-league affiliate the Toledo Mud Hens. The Mud Hens defeated the Tigers 3–1 before 10,322 at Ned Skeldon Stadium. Former Tiger and Mud Hen manager John Wockenfuss pitches five scoreless innings in relief allowing just three hits. The 40-year old Wockenfuss was primarily a catcher in his 12-year major league career and took to the mound because the Mud Hens were coming off a doubleheader the day before and had another one scheduled the following day. This game further highlighted the Tigers worst start in 35 years.

May 15: Torey Luvullo, batting .115 on the season, is sent to back the minor leagues. Gary Pettis replaces him on the roster, coming back from a Spring Training injury. Luvullo, who was tabbed to be the Tigers everyday first baseman, would never appear in another game in a Tiger uniform.

May 16: During the Tigers' 9-7 win over the Chicago White Sox at Tiger Stadium, Chris Brown leaves the game in the sixth inning with yet another injury, a sore back. An exacerbated Sparky Anderson tells reporters "I don't know (what's wrong) and I can't worry about it. I just say the hell with it. If they go down, they go down." It would be final game of Brown's career.

May 17: Reliever Guillermo Hernandez explodes after allowing five runs in the ninth inning of a 10-7 loss to the Chicago White Sox at Tiger Stadium. "I save seven (expletive) games and nobody comes around," Hernandez said. Then I lose and everybody wants to talk about the same thing (fans booing his arrival in games). I'm tired of the (expletive).

May 19: Manager Sparky Anderson left the club on the direction of team doctor Clarence Livingood due to physical exhaustion. Livingood told the press that Anderson was suffering from extreme stress to the point where he was unable to sleep. At the time, the Tigers were 14–24, last place in the American League East and had the worst record in Major League Baseball. Coach Dick Tracewski was named interim manager in Anderson's absence.

Hours later, second baseman Lou Whitaker hit his league-leading 10th home run as the Tigers defeated the Kansas City Royals 2–0. Whitaker would go on to hit a career-high 28 home runs in 1989. Doyle Alexander would leave the game with a broken jaw after being hit by a line drive off the bat of Frank White. Alexander would not miss any action.

Finally, Chris Brown was waived after batting .193 and no home runs. He had played in only 17 of the teams 38 games. Rick Schu was recalled to take Brown's place on the roster. Tracewski says; "A lot of things that were projected to happen did not happen. We had a third baseman who didn't want to play. We didn't ask him to hit .360, we only asked him to play. Veteran outfielder Chet Lemon added, "Chris Brown is hurting his career beyond comprehension."

May 21: Despite having the worst record in baseball and being in last place in the AL East, the Tigers find themselves 3.5 games out of first place after defeating the Kansas City Royals 4-2 at Tiger Stadium. Outfielder Fred Lynn says: "We're only four games out. We weren't winning these kind of games earlier....we are on the upswing now."

May 23: Pitcher Jack Morris is placed on the disabled list for the first time in his career. Morris had complained of soreness following a 7–3 loss to the Cleveland Indians on May 22. Morris became the fourth Tiger pitcher to be placed on the DL so far this season. Morris was in the midst of the worst start of his career with a 2–7 record with a 4.94 ERA. To replace him on the roster, the Tigers called up pitcher Mike Schwabe from AA London.

May 27: Randy Nosek, the Tigers' #1 pick in the 1985 draft is called up from the Class AA London, Ontario to take the place of Jack Morris in the starting rotation. Nosek will make his major league debut at Royals Stadium against Kansas City. Fighting butterflies with his family in attendance, Nosek walks eight and gives up three hits in a 5–1 loss to the Royals. The Tigers pitching staff is decimated by injuries, giving Nosek his chance. He would make one more appearance with Detroit before being sent back to the minors.

May 30: Despite a historically bad start, the Tigers find themselves tied for fifth place with a 21-28 record at the close of play. The fanbase is reminded of a poor start in 1987 that led to the AL East title. With numerous injuries, roster changes and the impending return of Sparky Anderson, there is reason for some hope.

May 31: Team doctor Clarence Livingood releases a statement that manager Sparky Anderson is making progress in his recovery and could return to the team within a week.

Lou Whitaker finishes the month tied for the American League lead in home runs with 13. Baltimore Orioles catcher and future teammate Mickey Tettleton also has hit 13 home runs.

Keith Moreland leads all Tiger hitters with a .341 average (43 of 126), while Frank Tanana (5-4 3.66) and Doyle Alexander (4-4, 2.78) lead the pitching staff. Guillermo Hernandez has ten saves despite a 5.50 ERA.

=== June ===
June 4: The Baltimore Orioles complete a three game sweep of the Tigers, sending Detroit into last place. It will be the last game that coach Dick Traczewski in Anderson's absence, with the team going 9-8. "Trixie" took the reins at different points in three previous seasons, but this would be the last game he ever manages in the big leagues.

June 5: Manager Sparky Anderson returned to the team after 17 days. Team doctor Clarence Livingood tells the media that Sparky's stress level was never life-threatening, but that he would be cutting back on appearances, commercials and charity work while coming to the ballpark later than he had previously. Livingood states that he believes the situation "probably frightened" the manager into changing his behavior.

Anderson returned to the dugout to see the Tigers lose that evening's game to the Boston Red Sox 5–2. Interim manager Dick Tracewski led the team to a 9–8 record in Anderson's absence. The team also announced that pitcher Jack Morris would miss an additional seven weeks after being placed on the disabled list on May 23 with a chip fracture in his right elbow.

June 5 is also the first day of the MLB Player draft. With their first selection (21st overall) the Tigers select right-handed pitcher Greg Gohr from Santa Clara University.

June 8: Shortstop Alan Trammell is placed on the 15 day disabled list due to back spasms. Infielder Mike Brumley is recalled from Toledo to take Trammell's place on the roster.

June 9: The Tigers play their first game at the new Skydome in Toronto, Ontario Canada. Blue Jays pitcher Dave Stieb combines with David Wells to allow only four Tiger hits as the Blue Jays blank the Tigers 2–0. Frank Tanana is the hard-luck loser, striking out 10 in a complete game effort.

June 10: Manager Sparky Anderson is interviewed by Marv Albert before a national broadcast of NBC's "Game of the Week" between the Tigers and Toronto Blue Jays. Anderson calls himself "stupid" for not following his own advice to players about stress and what led to his absence, the reason for the Tigers' poor start, and the Tigers' inability to develop young players. The Tigers would go on to defeat the Blue Jays before the national audience, 11–8.

June 16: In the 9th inning of a 9–4 loss to the California Angels at Tiger Stadium, catcher Matt Nokes is injured in a collision at home plate. Chili Davis crashed into Nokes in a close play at the plate, a play that Davis insisted wasn't intentional. Nokes had to be helped from the field and would be out of the lineup for almost two months. The fans in attendance entertained themselves by chanting "Bad Boys," made popular by recent championship of the Detroit Pistons of the NBA.

=== July ===
July 5: The final balloting for the American League All Star teams and starting lineups are announced. Consistent with their performance on the field, the Tigers fare poorly in the fan balloting. Lou Whitaker and Alan Trammell have the best name recognition, as both finish fourth in the voting for starting second baseman and shortstop respectively. Three Tigers (Torey Lovullo, Chris Brown and Kenny Williams), are no longer on the Tigers active roster when results are announced. Williams finishes last among all 42 American League outfielders; Louvello, second to last among first basemen. Brown, despite not appearing in a game since May, finishes 13th among 15 candidates.

July 6: Relief pitcher Mike Henneman is the only Tiger to be named to the American League All Star team. At the announcement of his selection, Henneman is 5–2 with 2 saves and a 3.21 ERA. Despite eight pitchers appearing in the game, Henneman and Chuck Finley of the California Angels do not see action.

July 28: The Tigers deal their leading hitter Keith Moreland to the Baltimore Orioles in exchange for minor league pitcher Brian DuBois. Moreland was batting .299 with 5 home runs and 35 RBI at the time of the trade to the Orioles who were leading the AL East by 3.5 games. The O's were looking to add a veteran bat and failed to add Harold Baines of the Chicago White Sox. Orioles director of player personnel Doug Melvin said of DuBois, "we gave up a kid that could come back to haunt us, but we got a guy we know could help us immediately." Detroit general manager Bill Lajoie said the Tigers were very fortunate to add DuBois and that he "was on the verge of becoming a solid major league performer."

=== August ===
August 7: For the first time in his major league career, Lou Whitaker starts a game at a position other than second base. Batting third and penciled in as the Tigers' designated hitter, Whitaker drives in two runs in Detroit's 5–3 win over the Milwaukee Brewers. The game was the first of a doubleheader and Whitaker returned to his customary position for the nightcap, a 5-2 Tiger loss.

August 17: Pitcher Brian DuBois makes his Major League debut. Named the starting pitcher against the New York Yankees at Tiger Stadium, DuBois goes six innings, allowing only two runs, but the Tigers' offense doesn't cooperate and the DuBois and the Tigers fall by a score of 2–1. DuBois had joined the Tigers after being traded for Keith Moreland on July 28.

August 18: In what would be the final appearance of his major league career, pitcher Willie Hernandez pitches the 9th inning of the Tigers' 7–3 win over the New York Yankees at Tiger Stadium. The 1984 Cy Young winner and MVP gives up a two-run home run to Bob Geren. Hernandez would reinjure his elbow that plagued him all season and finished the season with a 2–2 record and 15 saves. The game was also notable in that it was Bucky Dent's managerial debut for the Yankees, taking over for Dallas Green.

August 19: In the early morning hours, pitcher Charles Hudson, driving drunk, slammed his mother in-law's Mercury Cougar into a telephone pole in the Detroit suburb of Farmington Hills, Michigan. He spent a day and a half in intensive care with a broken left leg, right ankle and his right knee needed reconstructive surgery. A month later, Hudson was sentenced to one year's probation after pleading guilty to driving while impaired. Investigators said his blood alcohol level the night of the accident was 0.11. Under Michigan law, 0.10 was considered the legal limit.

Hudson would later discuss how he began to drink as he struggled in his baseball career. He would not pitch in the major leagues again and the Tigers released him in November 1989.

=== September ===
September 4: In the 7th inning of the Tigers' 5–1 win over the Kansas City Royals, outfielder Fred Lynn hit his 300th career home run. The blast came off of Royals ace Bret Saberhagen at Tiger Stadium in a Labor Day matinee game.

September 5: Catcher Jeff Datz and right-handed pitcher Shawn Holman both make their major league debuts in the Tigers 10–2 win over the Kansas City Royals at Tiger Stadium. Holman appeared in relief of starting pitcher Kevin Ritz and allowed one run in two innings of work. Datz also made his appearance in the same inning as Holman, as a defensive replacement.

September 8: The Tigers defeat the Chicago White Sox 7-5 at Tiger Stadium. It is the team's 7th victory in the row, the longest winning streak of the season. The last time the Tigers had won seven straight was in their World Championship season of 1984. Jack Morris pitched 8.1 innings to earn the win, Mike Brumley had a clutch hit to break a 2-2 tie, and Doug Strange made a key defensive play in the ninth inning to seal the win.

September 17: Pitcher Doyle Alexander voices his frustration on the season: "Frustration is no longer the word. That applied in June and July. Pathetic is a better word now. We've got guys playing on this team who have no idea how to play baseball." Alexander would go on to criticize his own performance as well as some of the decisions made earlier in the season, notably, the promotion of rookie Torey Lovullo.

September 27: After going seven innings and allowing three runs, Doyle Alexander suffers his 18th loss of the season in a 8-1 decision against the Toronto Blue Jays at Tiger Stadium. Alexander would lead all of baseball with 18 defeats in 1989 and this game would be his final appearance in a major league uniform.

=== October ===
October 1: The Tigers defeat the New York Yankees at Yankee Stadium 5–3. The victory prevents the Tigers from tying the then-franchise record of 104 losses in a season.

=== December ===
December 6: Veteran outfielder Fred Lynn leaves Detroit and signs with the San Diego Padres. The 37-year old Lynn hit .241 on the season with 11 home runs and 41 RBI.

December 20:The Tigers release Willie Hernandez and Doyle Alexander effectively bringing to an end the careers of both pitchers. Hernandez, a hero of the 1984 club, was the Cy Young and MVP that season, while Alexander helped the Tigers win the 1987 AL East title by going 9–0 after being acquired via trade from the Atlanta Braves.

=== Notable transactions ===
- May 19, 1989: Rick Schu was purchased by the Tigers from the Baltimore Orioles. Chris Brown was waived by the Tigers.
- June 16, 1989: Pat Sheridan was traded by the Tigers to the San Francisco Giants for Tracy Jones.
- July 28, 1989: Keith Moreland was traded by the Tigers to the Baltimore Orioles for Brian DuBois.
- August 17, 1989: Keith Atherton was signed as a free agent with the Detroit Tigers.

=== Season standings ===
AL East
Team	W	L	Pct.	GB	Home	Road
Toronto Blue Jays	89	73	.549	—	46‍–‍35	43‍–‍38
Baltimore Orioles	87	75	.537	2	47‍–‍34	40‍–‍41
Boston Red Sox	83	79	.512	6	46‍–‍35	37‍–‍44
Milwaukee Brewers	81	81	.500	8	45‍–‍36	36‍–‍45
New York Yankees	74	87	.460	14½	41‍–‍40	33‍–‍47
Cleveland Indians	73	89	.451	16	41‍–‍40	32‍–‍49
Detroit Tigers	59	103	.364	30	38‍–‍43	21‍–‍60

=== Record vs. opponents ===
1989 American League record Sources:
Team	BAL	BOS	CAL	CWS	CLE	DET	KC	MIL	MIN	NYY	OAK	SEA	TEX	TOR
Baltimore	—	6–7	6–6	6–6	7–6	10–3	6–6	7–6	4–8	8–5	5–7	6–6	9–3	7–6
Boston	7–6	—	4–8	7–5	8–5	11–2	4–8	6–7	6–6	7–6	7–5	5–7	6–6	5–8
California	6–6	8–4	—	8–5	5–7	11–1	4–9	7–5	11–2	6–6	5–8	7–6	6–7	7–5
Chicago	6–6	5–7	5–8	—	7–5	4–8	6–7	10–2	5–8	5–6	5–8	7–6	3–10	1–11
Cleveland	6–7	5–8	7–5	5–7	—	5–8	8–4	3–10	5–7	9–4	2–10	6–6	7–5	5–8
Detroit	3–10	2–11	1–11	8–4	8–5	—	6–6	6–7	5–7	6–7	4–8	4–8	4–8	2–11
Kansas City	6–6	8–4	9–4	7–6	4–8	6–6	—	8–4	7–6	6–6	7–6	9–4	8–5	7–5
Milwaukee	6–7	7–6	5–7	2–10	10–3	7–6	4–8	—	9–3	8–5	5–7	7–5	5–7	6–7
Minnesota	8–4	6–6	2–11	8–5	7–5	7–5	6–7	3–9	—	6–6	6–7	7–6	5–8	9–3
New York	5–8	6–7	6–6	6–5	4–9	7–6	6–6	5–8	6–6	—	3–9	8–4	5–7	7–6
Oakland	7–5	5–7	8–5	8–5	10–2	8–4	6–7	7–5	7–6	9–3	—	9–4	8–5	7–5
Seattle	6–6	7–5	6–7	6–7	6–6	8–4	4–9	5–7	6–7	4–8	4–9	—	6–7	5–7
Texas	3–9	6–6	7–6	10–3	5–7	8–4	5–8	7–5	8–5	7–5	5–8	7–6	—	5–7
Toronto	6–7	8–5	5–7	11–1	8–5	11–2	5–7	7–6	3–9	6–7	5–7	7–5	7–5	—

=== Roster ===
1989 Detroit Tigers
Roster
Pitchers: 19 Doyle Alexander; 42 Dave Beard; 41 Randy Bockus; 16 Brian Dubois; 48 Paul Gibson; 55 Brad Havens; 39 Mike Henneman; 21 Willie Hernández; 38 Shawn Holman; 27 Charles Hudson; 47 Jack Morris; 37 Randy Nosek; 41 Edwin Núñez; 16 Dave Palmer; 18 Ramón Peña; 31 Kevin Ritz; 44 Jeff Robinson; 46 Mike Schwabe; 49 Steve Searcy; 26 Frank Tanana; 43 Mike Trujillo; 36 Frank Williams	Catchers: 43 Jeff Datz; 8 Mike Heath; 33 Matt Nokes; 52 Matt Sinatro; Infielders: 14 Dave Bergman; 35 Chris Brown; 12 Mike Brumley; 23 Torey Lovullo; 10 Keith Moreland; 17 Al Pedrique; 35 Rick Schu; 20 Doug Strange; 3 Alan Trammell; 1 Lou Whitaker	Outfielders: 4 Billy Bean; 15 Tracy Jones; 34 Chet Lemon; 7 Scott Lusader; 9 Fred Lynn; 24 Gary Pettis; 10 Rob Richie; 15 Pat Sheridan; 32 Gary Ward; 25 Kenny Williams	Manager: 11 Sparky Anderson; Coaches: 50 Billy Consolo; 51 Alex Grammas; 56 Billy Muffett; 28 Vada Pinson; 53 Dick Tracewski

== Player stats ==
= Indicates team leader

=== Batting ===
==== Starters by position ====
Note: Pos = Position; G = Games played; AB = At bats; H = Hits; Avg. = Batting average; HR = Home runs; RBI = Runs batted in

Pos	Player	G	AB	H	Avg.	HR	RBI
C	Mike Heath	122	396	104	.263	10	43
1B	Dave Bergman	137	385	103	.268	7	37
2B	Lou Whitaker	148	509	128	.251	28	85
3B	Rick Schu	98	266	57	.214	7	21
SS	Alan Trammell	121	449	109	.243	5	43
LF	Fred Lynn	117	353	85	.241	11	46
CF	Gary Pettis	119	444	114	.257	1	18
RF	Chet Lemon	127	414	98	.237	7	47
DH	Keith Moreland	90	318	95	.299	5	35

==== Other batters ====
Note: G = Games played; AB = At bats; H = Hits; Avg. = Batting average; HR = Home runs; RBI = Runs batted in

Player	G	AB	H	Avg.	HR	RBI
Gary Ward	105	275	69	.251	9	29
Matt Nokes	87	268	67	.250	9	39
Kenny Williams	94	258	53	.205	6	23
Mike Brumley	92	212	42	.198	1	11
Doug Strange	64	196	42	.214	1	14
Tracy Jones	46	158	41	.259	3	26
Pat Sheridan	50	120	29	.242	3	15
Scott Lusader	40	103	26	.252	1	8
Torey Lovullo	29	87	10	.115	1	4
Al Pedrique	31	69	14	.203	0	5
Chris Brown	17	57	11	.193	0	4
Rob Richie	19	49	13	.265	1	10
Matt Sinatro	13	25	3	.120	0	1
Bill Bean	9	11	0	.000	0	0
Jeff Datz	7	10	2	.200	0	0

=== Pitching ===
==== Starting pitchers ====
Note: G = Games pitched; IP = Innings pitched; W = Wins; L = Losses; ERA = Earned run average; SO = Strikeouts

Player	G	IP	W	L	ERA	SO
Frank Tanana	33	223.2	10	14	3.58	147
Doyle Alexander	33	223.0	6	18	4.44	95
Jack Morris	24	170.1	6	14	4.86	115
Jeff Robinson	16	78.0	4	5	4.73	40
Kevin Ritz	12	74.0	4	6	4.38	56
Brian Dubois	6	36.0	0	4	1.75	13

==== Other pitchers ====
Note: G = Games pitched; IP = Innings pitched; W = Wins; L = Losses; ERA = Earned run average; SO = Strikeouts

Player	G	IP	W	L	ERA	SO
Paul Gibson	45	132.0	4	8	4.64	77
Charles Hudson	18	66.2	1	5	6.35	23
Mike Schwabe	13	44.2	2	4	6.04	13
Mike Trujillo	8	25.2	1	2	5.96	13
Steve Searcy	8	22.1	1	1	6.04	11
David Palmer	5	17.1	0	3	7.79	12
Randy Nosek	2	5.1	0	2	13.50	4
Dave Beard	2	5.1	0	2	5.06	1

==== Relief pitchers ====
Note: G = Games pitched; W = Wins; L = Losses; SV = Saves; ERA = Earned run average; SO = Strikeouts

Player	G	W	L	SV	ERA	SO
Willie Hernández	32	2	2	15	5.74	30
Mike Henneman	60	11	4	8	3.70	69
Frank Williams	42	3	3	1	3.64	33
Edwin Núñez	27	3	4	1	4.17	41
Brad Havens	13	1	2	0	5.56	15
Ramón Peña	8	0	0	0	6.00	12
Shawn Holman	5	0	0	0	1.80	9
Randy Bockus	2	0	0	0	5.06	2

== Farm system ==
Level	Team	League	Manager
AAA	Toledo Mud Hens	International League	John Wockenfuss
AA	London Tigers	Eastern League	Chris Chambliss
A	Lakeland Tigers	Florida State League	Johnny Lipon
A	Fayetteville Generals	South Atlantic League	Gene Roof
A-Short Season	Niagara Falls Rapids	New York–Penn League	Rick Magnante
Rookie	Bristol Tigers	Appalachian League	Rubén Amaro, Sr.
