= 1990 Detroit Tigers season =

Major League Baseball season

1990 Detroit Tigers
- League: American League
- Division: East
- Ballpark: Tiger Stadium
- City: Detroit, Michigan
- Record: 79–83 (.488)
- Divisional place: 3rd
- Owners: Tom Monaghan
- General managers: Bill Lajoie
- Managers: Sparky Anderson
- Television: WDIV-TV (George Kell, Al Kaline); PASS (Larry Osterman, Jim Northrup)
- Radio: WJR (Ernie Harwell, Paul Carey)

The 1990 Detroit Tigers season was the 90th season in franchise history. The Tigers finished in third place in the American League East, with a record of 79–83, which was a 20-win improvement on the dismal 1989 season. They scored 750 runs and allowed 754. Notably, Cecil Fielder hit 51 home runs, making him the (to date) only Tiger to hit at least 50 home runs in a season since Hank Greenberg in 1938.

== Offseason ==
- December 4, 1989: Steve Wapnick was drafted by the Tigers from the Toronto Blue Jays in the 1989 rule 5 draft.
- December 5, 1989: Tony Phillips was signed as a free agent by the Tigers.
- December 6, 1989: Bill Henderson (minors), Marcos Betances (minors), and Pat Austin (minors) were traded by the Tigers to the St. Louis Cardinals for Jim Lindeman and Matt Kinzer.
- December 7, 1989: Lloyd Moseby was signed as a free agent by the Tigers.
- December 8, 1989: Rick Schu was released by the Tigers.
- December 20, 1989: Willie Hernández was released by the Tigers.
- January 15, 1990: Cecil Fielder was signed as a free agent by the Tigers.
- January 15, 1990: Ed Romero was signed as a free agent by the Tigers.

== Regular season ==
- October 3, 1990: Cecil Fielder hit two home runs at Yankee Stadium to finish with 51 for the season. The 50th home run was hit off of Steve Adkins. Fielder was the first major leaguer since George Foster in 1977 to hit 50 home runs in a season. It was the 18th time that a major leaguer (and the 11th time that an American League player) hit 50 home runs in a season.

== Opening Day starters ==
- 3B Tony Phillips
- SS Alan Trammell
- 2B Lou Whitaker
- 1B Cecil Fielder
- CF Lloyd Moseby
- C Matt Nokes
- LF Gary Ward
- RF Chet Lemon
- DH Dave Bergman
- SP Jack Morris

=== Season standings ===
AL East
Team	W	L	Pct.	GB	Home	Road
Boston Red Sox	88	74	.543	—	51‍–‍30	37‍–‍44
Toronto Blue Jays	86	76	.531	2	44‍–‍37	42‍–‍39
Detroit Tigers	79	83	.488	9	39‍–‍42	40‍–‍41
Cleveland Indians	77	85	.475	11	41‍–‍40	36‍–‍45
Baltimore Orioles	76	85	.472	11½	40‍–‍40	36‍–‍45
Milwaukee Brewers	74	88	.457	14	39‍–‍42	35‍–‍46
New York Yankees	67	95	.414	21	37‍–‍44	30‍–‍51

=== Record vs. opponents ===
1990 American League record Sources:
Team	BAL	BOS	CAL	CWS	CLE	DET	KC	MIL	MIN	NYY	OAK	SEA	TEX	TOR
Baltimore	—	4–9	7–5	6–6	6–7	6–7	8–3	7–6	6–6	6–7	4–8	3–9	8–4	5–8
Boston	9–4	—	7–5	6–6	9–4	8–5	4–8	5–8	4–8	9–4	4–8	8–4	5–7	10–3
California	5–7	5–7	—	5–8	7–5	5–7	7–6	7–5	9–4	6–6	4–9	5–8	8–5	7–5
Chicago	6–6	6–6	8–5	—	5–7	5–7	9–4	10–2	7–6	10–2	8–5	8–5	7–6	5–7
Cleveland	7–6	4–9	5–7	7–5	—	5–8	6–6	9–4	7–5	5–8	4–8	7–5	7–5	4–9
Detroit	7–6	5–8	7–5	7–5	8–5	—	5–7	3–10	6–6	7–6	6–6	7–5	6–6	5–8
Kansas City	3–8	8–4	6–7	4–9	6–6	7–5	—	4–8	8–5	8–4	4–9	7–6	5–8	5–7
Milwaukee	6–7	8–5	5–7	2–10	4–9	10–3	8–4	—	4–8	6–7	5–7	4–8	5–7	7–6
Minnesota	6–6	8–4	4–9	6–7	5–7	6–6	5–8	8–4	—	6–6	6–7	6–7	5–8	3–9
New York	7–6	4–9	6–6	2–10	8–5	6–7	4–8	7–6	6–6	—	0–12	9–3	3–9	5–8
Oakland	8–4	8–4	9–4	5–8	8–4	6–6	9–4	7–5	7–6	12–0	—	9–4	8–5	7–5
Seattle	9–3	4–8	8–5	5–8	5–7	5–7	6–7	8–4	7–6	3–9	4–9	—	7–6	6–6
Texas	4–8	7–5	5–8	6–7	5–7	6–6	8–5	7–5	8–5	9–3	5–8	6–7	—	7–5
Toronto	8–5	3–10	5–7	7–5	9–4	8–5	7–5	6–7	9–3	8–5	5–7	6–6	5–7	—

=== Notable transactions ===
- May 1, 1990: Steve Wapnick was returned by the Tigers to the Toronto Blue Jays.
- June 4, 1990: Tony Clark was drafted by the Tigers in the 1st round of the 1990 Major League Baseball draft.
- June 13, 1990: John Shelby was signed as a free agent by the Tigers.
- June 18, 1990: Kenny Williams was selected off waivers from the Tigers by the Toronto Blue Jays.
- June 18, 1990: Tracy Jones was traded by the Tigers to the Seattle Mariners for Darnell Coles.
- July 15, 1990: Ed Romero was released by the Detroit Tigers.

=== Roster ===
1990 Detroit Tigers
Roster
Pitchers: 30 Scott Aldred; 16 Brian Dubois; 48 Paul Gibson; 19 Jerry Don Gleaton; 39 Mike Henneman; 43 Matt Kinzer; 20 Urbano Lugo; 18 Lance McCullers; 47 Jack Morris; 37 Randy Nosek; 41 Edwin Núñez; 17 Clay Parker; 23 Dan Petry; 31 Kevin Ritz; 44 Jeff Robinson; 46 Mike Schwabe; 49 Steve Searcy; 26 Frank Tanana; 35 Walt Terrell; 43 Steve Wapnick	Catchers: 8 Mike Heath; 33 Matt Nokes; 12 Rich Rowland; 10 Mark Salas; Infielders: 14 Dave Bergman; 45 Cecil Fielder; 24 Travis Fryman; 33 Jim Lindeman; 18 Johnny Paredes; 4 Tony Phillips; 12 Ed Romero; 3 Alan Trammell; 1 Lou Whitaker	Outfielders: 21 Darnell Coles; 22 Milt Cuyler; 15 Tracy Jones; 34 Chet Lemon; 7 Scott Lusader; 15,17 Lloyd Moseby; 9 Larry Sheets; 25 John Shelby; 32 Gary Ward; 25 Kenny Williams	Manager: 11 Sparky Anderson; Coaches: 50 Billy Consolo; 51 Alex Grammas; 56 Billy Muffett; 28 Vada Pinson; 53 Dick Tracewski

== Player stats ==
= Indicates team leader

= Indicates league leader

=== Batting ===
==== Starters by position ====
Note: Pos = Position; G = Games played; AB = At bats; H = Hits; Avg. = Batting average; HR = Home runs; RBI = Runs batted in

Pos	Player	G	AB	H	Avg.	HR	RBI
C	Mike Heath	122	370	100	.270	7	38
1B	Cecil Fielder	159	573	159	.277	51	132
2B	Lou Whitaker	132	472	112	.237	18	60
3B	Tony Phillips	152	573	144	.251	8	55
SS	Alan Trammell	146	559	170	.304	14	89
LF	Gary Ward	106	309	79	.256	9	46
CF	Lloyd Moseby	122	431	107	.248	14	51
RF	Chet Lemon	104	322	83	.258	5	32
DH	Dave Bergman	100	205	57	.278	2	26

==== Other batters ====
Note: G = Games played; AB = At bats; H = Hits; Avg. = Batting average; HR = Home runs; RBI = Runs batted in

Player	G	AB	H	Avg.	HR	RBI
Larry Sheets	131	360	94	.261	10	52
Travis Fryman	66	232	69	.297	9	27
John Shelby	78	222	55	.248	4	20
Mark Salas	74	164	38	.232	9	24
Tracy Jones	50	118	27	.229	4	9
Matt Nokes	44	111	30	.270	3	8
Darnell Coles	52	108	22	.204	1	4
Scott Lusader	45	87	21	.241	2	16
Kenny Williams	57	83	11	.133	0	5
Ed Romero	32	70	16	.229	0	4
Milt Cuyler	19	51	13	.255	0	8
Jim Lindeman	12	32	7	.219	2	8
Rich Rowland	7	19	3	.158	0	0
Johnny Paredes	6	8	1	.125	0	0

=== Pitching ===
==== Starting pitchers ====
Note: G = Games pitched; IP = Innings pitched; W = Wins; L = Losses; ERA = Earned run average; SO = Strikeouts

Player	G	IP	W	L	ERA	SO
Jack Morris	36	249.2	15	18	4.51	162
Frank Tanana	34	176.1	9	8	5.31	114
Dan Petry	32	149.2	10	9	4.45	73
Jeff Robinson	27	145.0	10	9	5.96	76
Walt Terrell	13	75.1	6	4	4.54	30
Brian Dubois	12	58.1	3	5	5.09	34
Kevin Ritz	4	7.1	0	4	11.05	3

==== Other pitchers ====
Note: G = Games pitched; IP = Innings pitched; W = Wins; L = Losses; ERA = Earned run average; SO = Strikeouts

Player	G	IP	W	L	ERA	SO
Steve Searcy	16	75.1	2	7	4.66	66
Lance McCullers	9	29.2	1	0	2.73	20
Urbano Lugo	13	24.1	2	0	7.03	12
Scott Aldred	4	14.1	1	2	3.77	7
Randy Nosek	3	7.0	1	1	7.71	3

==== Relief pitchers ====
Note: G = Games pitched; IP = Innings pitched; W = Wins; L = Losses; SV = Saves; ERA = Earned run average; SO = Strikeouts

Player	G	IP	W	L	SV	ERA	SO
Mike Henneman	69	94.1	8	6	22	3.05	50
Paul Gibson	61	97.1	5	4	3	3.05	56
Jerry Don Gleaton	57	82.2	1	3	13	2.94	56
Edwin Núñez	42	80.1	3	1	6	2.24	66
Clay Parker	24	51.0	2	2	0	3.18	20
Steve Wapnick	4	7.0	0	0	0	6.43	6
Mike Schwabe	1	3.2	0	0	0	2.45	1
Matt Kinzer	1	1.2	0	0	0	16.20	1

== Awards and honors ==
- Cecil Fielder, Major League Home Run Champion (51)
- Cecil Fielder, American League RBI Champion (132)
- Cecil Fielder, Silver Slugger Award

MLB All-Star Game

- Cecil Fielder, first base, reserve
- Alan Trammell, shortstop, reserve

=== Team leaders ===
- Home Runs – Cecil Fielder (51)
- Runs Batted In – Cecil Fielder (132)

== Fielder's 51 Home Runs ==
Home Run	Game	Date	Inning	Location	Opposing Pitcher	Team	Reference
1	6	April 14	6th	Tiger Stadium	Dave Johnson	Baltimore Orioles	
2	9	April 18	5th	Tiger Stadium	Clay Parker	New York Yankees	
3	13	April 22	4th	Memorial Stadium	Jeff Ballard	Baltimore Orioles	
4	15	April 24	9th	Metrodome	John Candelaria	Minnesota Twins	
5	18	April 28	5th	Tiger Stadium	Paul Mirabella	Milwaukee Brewers	
6	18	April 28	8th	Tiger Stadium	Tony Fossas	Milwaukee Brewers	
7	20	April 30	9th	Tiger Stadium	Mark Knudson	Milwaukee Brewers	
8	26	May 6	3rd	SkyDome	Jimmy Key	Toronto Blue Jays	
9	26	May 6	5th	SkyDome	Jimmy Key	Toronto Blue Jays	
10	26	May 6	7th	SkyDome	David Wells	Toronto Blue Jays	
11	27	May 7	4th	County Stadium	Mark Knudson	Milwaukee Brewers	
12	28	May 8	2nd	County Stadium	Jaime Navarro	Milwaukee Brewers	
13	30	May 10	2nd	Tiger Stadium	Todd Stottlemyre	Toronto Blue Jays	
14	34	May 15	7th	Arlington Stadium	Kevin Brown	Texas Rangers	
15	37	May 18	7th	Comiskey Park	Ken Patterson	Chicago White Sox	
16	39	May 20	4th	Comiskey Park	Greg Hibbard	Chicago White Sox	
17	42	May 23	3rd	Tiger Stadium	Mike Jeffcoat	Texas Rangers	
18	45	May 26	2nd	Tiger Stadium	Jerry Kutzler	Chicago White Sox	
19	50	June 1	2nd	Kingdome	Matt Young	Seattle Mariners	
20	54	June 6	2nd	Cleveland Municipal Stadium	Greg Swindell	Cleveland Indians	
21	54	June 6	4th	Cleveland Municipal Stadium	Greg Swindell	Cleveland Indians	
22	54	June 6	5th	Cleveland Municipal Stadium	Greg Swindell	Cleveland Indians	
23	61	June 13	2nd	Tiger Stadium	John Farrell	Cleveland Indians	
24	62	June 14	5th	Tiger Stadium	Sergio Valdez	Cleveland Indians	
25	65	June 17	7th	Tiger Stadium	Chuck Finley	California Angels	
26	77	June 30	5th	Royals Stadium	Storm Davis	Kansas City Royals	
27	80	July 3	1st	Comiskey Park	Eric King	Chicago White Sox	
28	83	July 6	4th	Tiger Stadium	Tom Gordon	Kansas City Royals	
29	87	July 13	6th	Tiger Stadium	Bobby Witt	Texas Rangers	
30	92	July 18	6th	Tiger Stadium	Greg Hibbard	Chicago White Sox	
31	95	July 21	1st	Arlington Stadium	Mike Jeffcoat	Texas Rangers	
32	98	July 24	3rd	Tiger Stadium	John Mitchell	Baltimore Orioles	
33	104	July 30	4th	Yankee Stadium	Dave LaPoint	New York Yankees	
34	108	August 3	2nd	Fenway Park	Greg Harris	Boston Red Sox	
35	111	August 7	9th	Skydome	Jimmy Key	Toronto Blue Jays	
36	117	August 13	1st	Cleveland Stadium	Jeff Shaw	Cleveland Indians	
37	120	August 16	3rd	Tiger Stadium	Ron Robinson	Milwaukee Brewers	
38	121	August 17	6th	Tiger Stadium	Tom Candiotti	Cleveland Indians	
39	122	August 18	3rd	Tiger Stadium	Efrain Valdez	Cleveland Indians	
40	127	August 25	1st	Tiger Stadium	Dave Stewart	Oakland Athletics	
41	127	August 25	4th	Tiger Stadium	Dave Stewart	Oakland Athletics	
42	130	August 29	8th	Kingdome	Matt Young	Seattle Mariners	
43	135	September 3	6th	Tiger Stadium	Jimmy Key	Toronto Blue Jays	
44	137	September 5	6th	Tiger Stadium	David Wells	Toronto Blue Jays	
45	139	September 7	6th	County Stadium	Ted Higuera	Milwaukee Brewers	
46	145	September 13	9th	Tiger Stadium	Mike Witt	New York Yankees	
47	148	September 16	5th	Tiger Stadium	Mark Leiter	New York Yankees	
48	153	September 23	2nd	Oakland Coliseum	Mike Moore	Oakland Athletics	
49	156	September 27	8th	Tiger Stadium	Dennis Lamp	Boston Red Sox	
50	162	October 3	4th	Yankee Stadium	Steve Adkins	New York Yankees	
51	162	October 3	8th	Yankee Stadium	Alan Mills	New York Yankees	

== Farm system ==
Level	Team	League	Manager
AAA	Toledo Mud Hens	International League	John Wockenfuss and Tom Gamboa
AA	London Tigers	Eastern League	Chris Chambliss
A	Lakeland Tigers	Florida State League	Johnny Lipon
A	Fayetteville Generals	South Atlantic League	Gene Roof
A-Short Season	Niagara Falls Rapids	New York–Penn League	Juan López
Rookie	Bristol Tigers	Appalachian League	Ken Cunningham

LEAGUE CHAMPIONS: London
