= Joseph Kain =

American politician

Joseph Kain (December 4, 1854–May 3, 1907) was an American businessman and politician.

Kain was born in Kilwinning, Scotland. In 1861, he emigrated with his parents to the United States and settled in Pennsylvania. In 1866, Kain and his parents settled in Braidwood, Illinois. Kain owned a furniture store in Braidwood. He also was involved with the funeral home, livery and stable businesses in Braidwood. Kain served on the Kane County Board of Supervisors and was a Democrat. He served in the Illinois House of Representatives in 1897 and 1898. Kain died in Chicago, Illinois.
