= Braidwood, Illinois =

- City
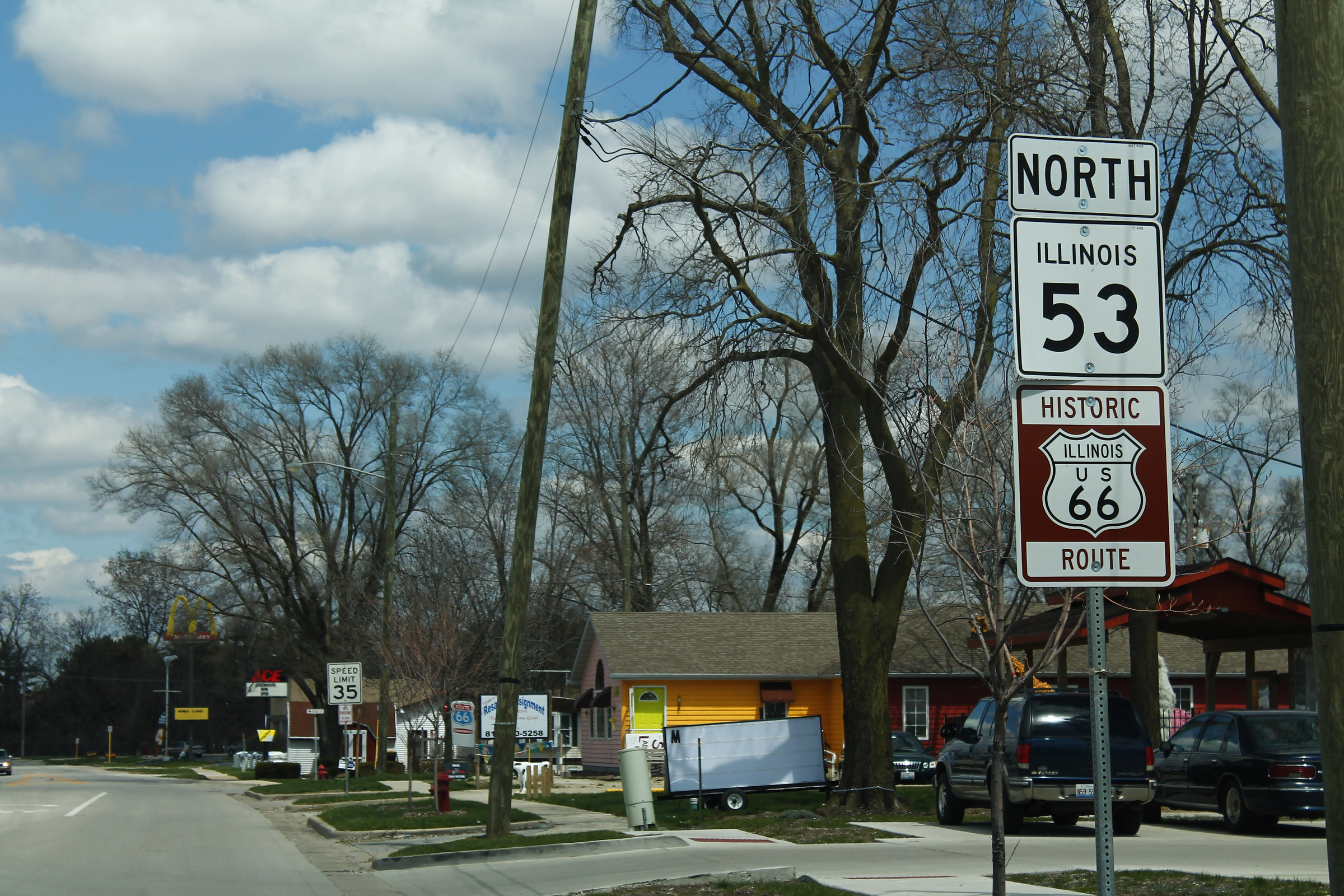
- Illinois Route 53 and Historic U.S. Route 66 in Braidwood

- Location of Braidwood in Will County, Illinois.
- Coordinates: 41°15′30″N 88°14′46″W
- Country: United States
- State: Illinois
- County: Will, Grundy

Area
  - Total: 5.47 sq mi (14.17 km^{2})
  - Land: 5.30 sq mi (13.72 km^{2})
  - Water: 0.18 sq mi (0.46 km^{2})
- Elevation: 568 ft (173 m)

Population (2020)
  - Total: 6,194
  - Density: 1,169.7/sq mi (451.61/km^{2})
- Time zone: UTC-6 (CST)
  - Summer (DST): UTC-5 (CDT)
- ZIP code: 60408
- Area code: 815/779
- FIPS code: 17-07770
- GNIS feature ID: 2394237
- Website: www.braidwood.gov

Braidwood is a city in Will and Grundy counties, Illinois, United States, approximately 53 miles (85 km) southwest of Chicago and 18 miles (29 km) south of Joliet. As of the 2020 census, Braidwood had a population of 6,194.

The Braidwood Nuclear Generating Station, a nuclear power plant owned by Exelon Corporation, is also located in the area (although the plant's address is actually in the nearby village of Braceville). The station is one of the major employers in the area and provides a significant portion of the electricity used in the Chicago area. The plant has been the subject of controversy concerning a series of leaks since 2007.

== History ==
In 1864, a farmer digging for water at the site of the present city found coal instead. Deposits were substantial and the demand for coal in nearby Chicago was high, so companies rushed to acquire land and set up operations. A mining boomtown sprang up, a post office was established in 1867, and the community was called Keeversville. James Braidwood was an early member of the community, and in 1872 he was hired by one company to superintend the sinking of the first deep mine shaft. The addition of more deep-shaft mines followed, and on March 4, 1873, the city was incorporated and named in Braidwood's honor.

Concerning the city's early population, Donna reports,

According to the U. S. Bureau of Census for 1880 the population of Braidwood was 5,524, the highest of record in the census reports. In that year the population of the entire Township of Reed was 5,981. Since coal production reached its peak in 1877-1878, it is quite possible that the population may have been near 7,500 in those years, but hardly higher. Hundreds of people left Braidwood following the area's worst strike in 1877, when strike-breakers were imported by the coal companies, reducing the actual recorded census of 1880 to near the 6,000 number.

Businesses and the lives of residents were centered on the coal mines, with economic prosperity and depression occurring in their turn. Mines cut back operations during summer months, when warm weather reduced the demand for coal, leaving many miners unemployed. The disputes between coal companies and miners over wages and working conditions were always rancorous and often violent, typical for the late nineteenth and early twentieth centuries.

On February 16, 1883, the Diamond Mine in Braidwood was suddenly flooded, resulting in the deaths of 73 miners. See 1883 Diamond Mine Disaster.

There was a combination of ethnicities, providing religious and cultural diversity. At first most miners were Americans or immigrants from northern Europe. African Americans arrived from West Virginia, and many later residents would arrive as immigrants from eastern and southern Europe.

== Geography ==
According to the 2010 census, Braidwood has a total area of 4.764 square miles (12.34 km^{2}), of which 4.58 square miles (11.86 km^{2}) (or 96.14%) is land and 0.184 square miles (0.48 km^{2}) (or 3.86%) is water.

=== Major highways ===
- I-55
- IL 53
- IL 113
- IL 129

== Demographics ==
Historical population
Census	Pop.	Note	%±
1880	5,524		—
1890	4,641		−16.0%
1900	3,279		−29.3%
1910	1,958		−40.3%
1920	1,297		−33.8%
1930	1,161		−10.5%
1940	1,354		16.6%
1950	1,485		9.7%
1960	1,944		30.9%
1970	2,323		19.5%
1980	3,429		47.6%
1990	3,584		4.5%
2000	5,203		45.2%
2010	6,191		19.0%
2020	6,194		0.0%
U.S. Decennial Census

=== Racial and ethnic composition ===
Braidwood city, Illinois – Racial and ethnic composition Note: the US Census treats Hispanic/Latino as an ethnic category. This table excludes Latinos from the racial categories and assigns them to a separate category. Hispanics/Latinos may be of any race.
Race / Ethnicity (NH = Non-Hispanic)	Pop 2000	Pop 2010	Pop 2020	% 2000	% 2010	% 2020
White alone (NH)	4,985	5,772	5,354	95.81%	93.23%	86.44%
Black or African American alone (NH)	9	22	56	0.17%	0.36%	0.90%
Native American or Alaska Native alone (NH)	4	14	8	0.08%	0.23%	0.13%
Asian alone (NH)	17	29	20	0.33%	0.47%	0.32%
Native Hawaiian or Pacific Islander alone (NH)	0	0	0	0.00%	0.00%	0.00%
Other race alone (NH)	8	5	4	0.15%	0.08%	0.06%
Mixed race or Multiracial (NH)	33	43	306	0.63%	0.69%	4.94%
Hispanic or Latino (any race)	147	306	446	2.83%	4.94%	7.20%
Total	5,203	6,191	6,194	100.00%	100.00%	100.00%

=== 2020 census ===
As of the 2020 census, Braidwood had a population of 6,194. The median age was 42.7 years. 21.4% of residents were under the age of 18 and 16.4% of residents were 65 years of age or older. For every 100 females, there were 103.1 males, and for every 100 females age 18 and over, there were 101.4 males.

98.4% of residents lived in urban areas, while 1.6% lived in rural areas.

There were 2,471 households in Braidwood, of which 28.3% had children under the age of 18 living in them. Of all households, 51.4% were married-couple households, 19.7% were households with a male householder and no spouse or partner present, and 21.2% were households with a female householder and no spouse or partner present. About 26.6% of all households were made up of individuals and 11.5% had someone living alone who was 65 years of age or older.

There were 2,982 housing units, of which 17.1% were vacant. The homeowner vacancy rate was 1.6% and the rental vacancy rate was 5.7%.

=== 2000 census ===
As of the census of 2000, there were 5,203 people, 1,843 households, and 1,422 families residing in the city. The population density was 1,124.0 inhabitants per square mile (434.0/km^{2}). There were 2,305 housing units at an average density of 497.9 per square mile (192.2/km^{2}). The racial makeup of the city was 97.48% White, 0.27% African American, 0.10% Native American, 0.33% Asian, 0.79% from other races, and 1.04% from two or more races. Hispanic or Latino of any race were 2.83% of the population. Was also known by Blacks to be a "sundown town".

There were 1,843 households, out of which 39.8% had children under the age of 18 living with them, 62.3% were married couples living together, 9.5% had a female householder with no husband present, and 22.8% were non-families. 18.5% of all households were made up of individuals, and 6.2% had someone living alone who was 65 years of age or older. The average household size was 2.81 and the average family size was 3.20.

In the city, the population was spread out, with 29.5% under the age of 18, 8.6% from 18 to 24, 32.2% from 25 to 44, 20.9% from 45 to 64, and 8.8% who were 65 years of age or older. The median age was 34 years. For every 100 females, there were 101.3 males. For every 100 females age 18 and over, there were 98.4 males.

== Education ==
Reed-Custer Community Unit School District 255 educates students from the Will County portion of Braidwood, as well as Custer Park, Essex, and the Will County portions of Braceville and Godley and much of the Will County portion of Diamond. The district has 3 schools: Reed-Custer Elementary School (Grades PreK-5), Reed-Custer Middle School (Grades 6–8), and Reed-Custer High School (Grades 9–12). The district level administrators are: Mark Mitchell (Superintendent), Christine Nelson (Assistant Superintendent), and Jim King (Director of Operations). Reed-Custer High School is located at 249 Comet Drive in Braidwood, IL 60408, and is part of the Reed-Custer School District known as 255U.

The Grundy County portion of Braidwood is in the Coal City Community Unit School District 1.

== Notable people ==
- Kay Cannon, writer (30 Rock); Emmy nominee
- Anton Cermak, immigrant from Bohemia and the 34th mayor of Chicago; worked as a miner in Braidwood.
- Brian Dubois, pitcher with the Detroit Tigers; played in the state championships with Reed-Custer High School
- Brent Headrick, pitcher with the New York Yankees; born and raised in Braidwood
- Joseph Kain, Illinois businessman and politician
- Artie Matthews, a songwriter, pianist, and ragtime composer; born in Braidwood (1888)
- John Mitchell, early UMW president; born in Braidwood (1870, before incorporation); worked in the local mines as a child
- Les Norman, outfielder with the Kansas City Royals; played in the state championships with Reed-Custer High School
- Doug Pinnick, songwriter, bassist, and co-lead singer for rock band King's X; born and raised in Braidwood

== Popular culture ==
- Braidwood Inn (now the Sun Motel) was featured in the film Planes, Trains and Automobiles.
