= Rick Eckstein =

American baseball coach (born 1973)

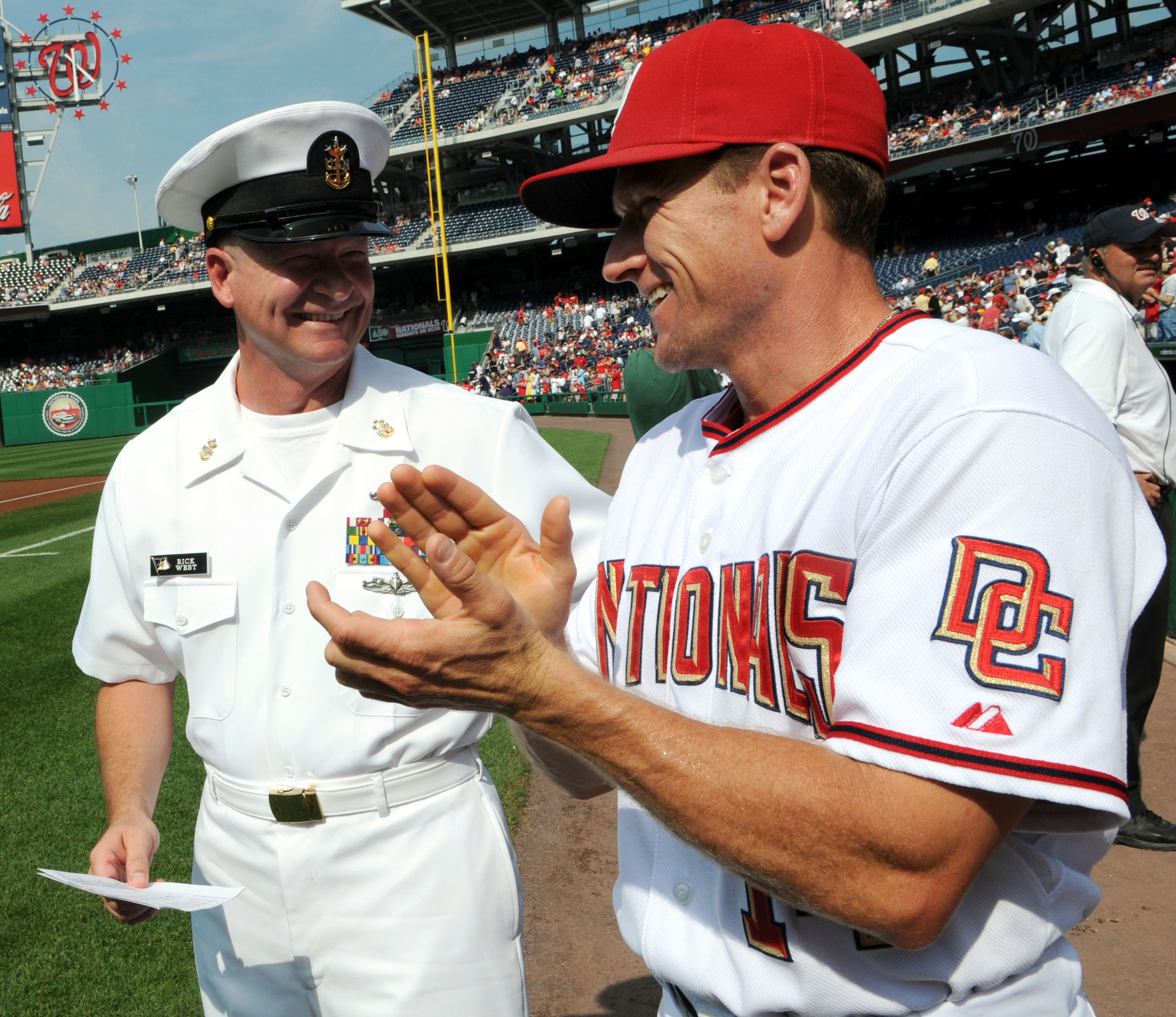
- Rick West (left) and Eckstein (right) in 2010
- Coach
- Born: March 4, 1973 (age 53); Sanford, Florida, U.S.
- Stats at Baseball Reference

Teams
- As coach: Washington Nationals (2009–2013); Los Angeles Angels of Anaheim (2014); Pittsburgh Pirates (2019–2021)

Rick H. Eckstein (born March 4, 1973) is an American professional baseball hitting coach. He is a hitting coach and the former hitting coach for Washington Nationals and Pittsburgh Pirates of Major League Baseball (MLB) and the Kentucky Wildcats baseball team, and assistant hitting coach and scout for the Los Angeles Angels of Anaheim of MLB.

== Career ==
Eckstein played college baseball at the University of Florida and, after graduation, became a volunteer assistant for the Gators. Eckstein became the hitting coach for the Washington Nationals of Major League Baseball in September 2008, after serving as the Columbus Clippers hitting coach. He also was the hitting coach on the United States national baseball team in the 2008 Olympics.

On November 5, 2013, Eckstein was named to the Los Angeles Angels of Anaheim coaching staff for the 2014 season. On August 14, 2014, Eckstein left the Angels to join the staff of Gary Henderson at the University of Kentucky. He was the minor league hitting coordinator for the Minnesota Twins organization for the 2017 and 2018 seasons.

The Pittsburgh Pirates hired Eckstein as their hitting coach after the 2018 season. On August 30, 2021, after nearly 3 seasons as hitting coach, the Pirates fired Eckstein.

In 2024, he was named the manager of the United States national under-18 baseball team for the qualifying rounds of the U-18 Baseball World Cup. He also served as the hitting coach of the senior national team at the 2024 WBSC Premier12. In 2025, he returned to manage the under-18 team.

== Personal life ==
Eckstein was raised in what he called "a very strong Catholic family" and served as an altar boy as a child. He is the older brother of former major leaguer David Eckstein. On December 8, 2010, Eckstein donated his right kidney to his brother, Ken, who is currently suffering from a renal disease.

Sporting positions
Preceded by Lenny Harris	Washington Nationals Hitting Coach; 2008–2013	Succeeded by Rick Schu
Preceded by Jeff Branson	Pittsburgh Pirates Hitting Coach; 2019–present	Succeeded by Incumbent
