= Reed-Custer High School =

Location
- 249 Comet Drive; Braidwood, Illinois; United States
- 41.2583°N 88.206°W

Information
- Type: Public high school
- Principal: Chad Klover
- Teaching staff: 35.60 (FTE)
- Grades: 9-12
- Enrollment: 397 (2023–2024)
- Student to teacher ratio: 11.15
- Colors: Black, white, and gold
- Athletics conference: Illinois Central Eight
- Nickname: Comets
- Website: www.rc255.net/apps/pages/index.jsp?uREC_ID=4272243&type=d&pREC_ID=2521617

Reed-Custer High School is a 4-year public high school located at 249 Comet Drive in Braidwood, a southwest suburb of Chicago, Illinois. RCHS is part of the Reed-Custer School District (255U).

== Notable alumni ==
- Kay Cannon, comedy writer and producer, creator of the Pitch Perfect film series
- Brian Dubois, baseball player
- Brent Headrick, baseball player
- Les Norman, baseball player
