= Dave Beard =

American baseball player (born 1959)

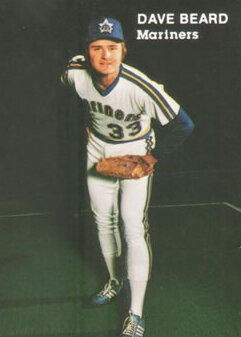
- Beard with the Seattle Mariners c. 1984
- Pitcher
- Born: October 2, 1959 (age 66); Atlanta, Georgia, U.S.
- Batted: Left Threw: Right

MLB debut
- July 16, 1980, for the Oakland Athletics

Last MLB appearance
- July 21, 1989, for the Detroit Tigers

MLB statistics
- Win–loss record: 19–20
- Earned run average: 4.70
- Strikeouts: 185
- Stats at Baseball Reference

Teams
- Oakland Athletics (1980–1983); Seattle Mariners (1984); Chicago Cubs (1985); Detroit Tigers (1989)

Charles David Beard (born October 2, 1959) is an American former professional baseball right-handed pitcher. He played in Major League Baseball for the Oakland Athletics, Seattle Mariners, Chicago Cubs, and Detroit Tigers from 1980 to 1989.

Following his high school days at Sequoyah High School in Doraville, Georgia, Beard was drafted by the Athletics in the sixth round of the 1977 amateur draft. After two strong minor league seasons in three years, Beard was promoted to the Athletics and made his major league debut at age 20 on July 16, 1980, pitching the ninth inning of a loss to the Tigers. He appeared in twelve more games that season, all in relief, and earned one save and one loss on the season, posting an earned run average of 3.38. The Athletics tended to use him in games they were losing; in fact, his team was on top only twice when he was summoned to the mound, and their only win in a game where Beard appeared was when he earned his lone save on August 1 against the Cleveland Indians.

In 1981, Beard was called up to the big leagues when rosters expanded September 1, and he appeared in eight games over the final month, collecting three more saves and his first big league win, which came in the first game of a doubleheader against the Toronto Blue Jays on September 22, when he held Toronto scoreless for the final 5 1/3 innings of an extra inning tilt. He made two postseason appearances with the playoff-bound A's. His first appearance was a 1 1/3-inning save to close out the Divisional Series against the Kansas City Royals. However, his ALCS appearance versus the New York Yankees would be less successful; he allowed three earned runs in 2/3 of an inning in game 2 as the Yankees swept the A's out of the playoffs.

Still, Beard impressed enough to earn a roster spot for 1982, when he spent nearly the entire season in the big leagues for the first time, going 10–9 with 11 saves and a 3.44 ERA. However, injury hit in 1983, and Beard struggled to a 5.61 ERA and a 5–5 record while posting 10 more saves. After the season, Oakland parted ways with Beard, trading him to the Seattle Mariners with Bob Kearney in exchange for Darrel Akerfelds and Bill Caudill.

With Seattle in 1984, Beard had injury issues again, with 37 days between big league appearances at one point during the season. He went 3–2 with only five saves and an even higher ERA of 5.80. They released him after spring training in 1985, but he was signed by Cleveland less than two weeks later. After 16 appearances with their AAA club in Maine, Cleveland shipped Beard to the Cubs organization in exchange for Tom Grant. Beard posted a sparkling 0.56 ERA in 11 games for the Cubs AAA team in Iowa, posting two wins and three saves, before being called up to the big leagues again when rosters expanded in September. He managed just a 6.39 ERA in nine appearances and was released after the season.

The Atlanta Braves signed Beard as a free agent in December 1985. He spent all of 1986 with their AAA team before again opting for free agency. Beard was out of baseball for 14 months before signing with the Tigers. He then spent all of 1988 and much of 1989 as a starting pitcher in Detroit's farm system, working his way back to the majors again. He made his first start since June 29, 1982 when the Tigers called him up for a July 18 game in the 1989 season. Unfortunately for Beard, four unearned runs scored early due to a Doug Strange error, and his day did not get much better. He took the loss in what would be his penultimate major league contest. His final appearance was three days later, and after allowing two runs in 1/3 of an inning, Beard found himself back in the minors. He was released after the 1989 season and subsequently retired.
