= Brian DuBois =

American baseball player (1967–2023)

- Pitcher
- Born: April 18, 1967; Joliet, Illinois, U.S.
- Died: February 12, 2023 (aged 55); Appleton, Wisconsin, U.S.
- Batted: Left Threw: Left

MLB debut
- August 17, 1989, for the Detroit Tigers

Last MLB appearance
- July 5, 1990, for the Detroit Tigers

MLB statistics
- Win–loss record: 3–9
- Earned run average: 3.82
- Strikeouts: 47
- Stats at Baseball Reference

Teams
- Detroit Tigers (1989–1990)

Brian Andrew DuBois (April 18, 1967 – February 12, 2023) was an American left-handed Major League Baseball (MLB) pitcher who played for two seasons. He played for the Detroit Tigers for six games during the 1989 Detroit Tigers season and 12 games during the 1990 Detroit Tigers season. Dubois had been traded from the Baltimore Orioles to the Tigers for Keith Moreland on July 28, 1989. On September 6, 1989, he picked up a rare five-inning save. DuBois pitched five shutout innings and picked up the save during an 11–5 Tigers victory over the Royals. It was his only save at the MLB level.

DuBois attended Reed-Custer High School in Braidwood, Illinois, from 1981 to 1985. On Tuesday, June 6, 1985, DuBois ended an All-American high school pitching career with a 5–0 win over Litchfield (IL) High School during the Illinois Class A State Championship Title Game. In the Comets' 5–0 triumph over Litchfield, DuBois struck out 12 and came within one slip of pitching his second no-hitter in three tournament appearances. He threw 75 pitches in the state title game, 57 of them strikes. In one stretch, he struck out four batters on 12 pitches.

In 13 2/3 innings, he struck out 29 batters, walked three, allowed a blooper hit and even picked two men off first base. Minutes after the title game, DuBois found out he had been selected by the Baltimore Orioles in the fourth round of the free-agent draft.

DuBois' struck out 226 batters in 1985. It remains the all-time highest number of strikeouts during one season in Illinois High School Association's (IHSA) baseball history. During the 1985 season, DuBois pitched 109 innings, recorded an ERA of 0.06 with 3 no-hitters.

During his varsity career at Reed-Custer High School, DuBois had an ERA of .074, and struck out 626 batters in 295 innings. His 626 career strikeouts remain the second all-time highest in Illinois' high school history.

DuBois died from cancer in Appleton, Wisconsin, on February 12, 2023, at the age of 55.
