= Rich Rowland =

American baseball player (1964–2026)

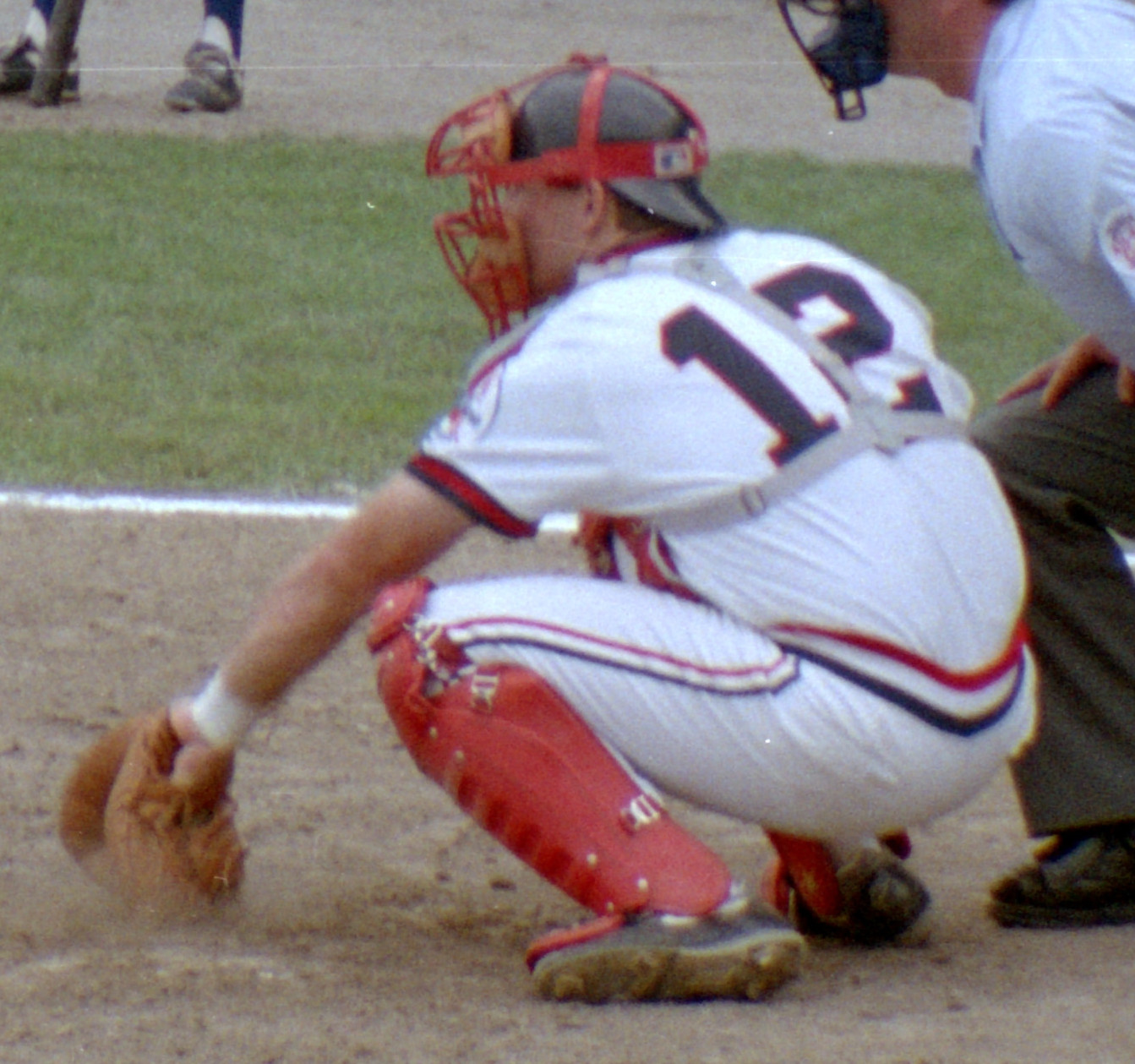
- Rowland with the Toledo Mud Hens in 1992
- Catcher
- Born: February 25, 1964; Cloverdale, California, U.S.
- Died: August 25, 2026 (aged 62); Cloverdale, California, U.S.
- Batted: Right Threw: Right

MLB debut
- September 7, 1990, for the Detroit Tigers

Last MLB appearance
- June 19, 1995, for the Boston Red Sox

MLB statistics
- Batting average: .213
- Home runs: 9
- Runs batted in: 26
- Stats at Baseball Reference

Teams
- Detroit Tigers (1990–1993); Boston Red Sox (1994–1995)

Richard Garnet Rowland (February 25, 1964 – August 25, 2026) was an American professional baseball player. He played in Major League Baseball as a backup catcher for the Detroit Tigers and the Boston Red Sox from 1990 to 1995. In addition to catching, he also played sparsely as a designated hitter, first baseman, third baseman, and pinch runner. Prior to playing professional baseball, Rowland attended Mendocino College in Ukiah, California, nearby to his home . He also had a longer career in minor league baseball on and off from 1988 to 1997, where he even served as a pitcher in three games.

== Minor leagues ==
Born in Cloverdale, California, Rowland played for minor league baseball for a total of nine seasons from 1988 to 1997; he did not play in the minor leagues in 1994. He played for the minor leagues during the same seasons that he also played in the Major Leagues. He debuted in the minor leagues on the Bristol Tigers (now the Bristol Pirates) in 1988 – a rookie-class Appalachian League team formerly owned by the Detroit Tigers. That season, he played 56 games for a .274 batting average in 186 at-bats as catcher. In 1989, he advanced to the Tigers' A-class Fayetteville Generals of the South Atlantic League, where he had a .272 batting average, 102 hits, and nine home runs. He also recorded two games pitched, pitching a total of two innings and allowing one run. Continuing through the Tigers' farm system, he advanced to the AA-class London Tigers of the Eastern League in 1990. He played for London for the first half of the season, where his statistics were impressive enough for a mid-season promotion to the AAA-class Toledo Mud Hens of the International League. For London, he batted .286 with 46 hits in 47 games with 161 at-bats. For Toledo, he batted .260 with 50 hits and 192 at-bats.

For his efforts, he was called up to the Detroit Tigers on September 7, 1990 and played seven games with them during the 1990 season. From 1991 to 1993, he played the majority of time with Toledo, while being called up on occasion to play for the Tigers as catcher. His statistic in the Major Leagues were unimpressive due to his limited time on the Tigers' roster, but his statistics with Toledo were far more impressive. When he was not called up to play for the Tigers, he was a consistently solid hitting full-time catcher with Toledo reaching 136 games in 1992. His minor league playing time in 1993 was shorter, as he played more time on the Tigers. That season with Toledo, he batted .268 but hit 21 home runs in 325 at-bats— a relatively high home run ratio of 15.48. His slugging percentage of .548 ranked fourth in the International League in 1993.

At the start of the 1994 season, Rowland was traded from the Detroit Tigers to the Boston Red Sox for John Flaherty and did not play in the minor leagues for Boston that year. In 1995, he played for Boston's AAA affiliate Pawtucket Red Sox, but he played little time for Pawtucket since he played more for Boston. With Pawtucket, he batted .258 in 34 games and 124 at-bats. At the end of the 1995 season, Rowland was traded to the Toronto Blue Jays, where he played on their AAA affiliate Syracuse Chiefs of the International League in 1996. He played 96 games with 288 at-bats but only had a .226 batting average (his lowest minor league batting average). While on the Chiefs, he was never called up to play for the Blue Jays and was traded to the San Francisco Giants for the start of 1997. He never played for the Giants but instead played on their AAA affiliate Phoenix Firebirds of the Pacific Coast League during the 1997 season. His time on the Chiefs was short, and he only played in 19 games before retiring.

== Major leagues ==
=== Detroit Tigers ===
Rowland was drafted by the Detroit Tigers in round 17 of the June 1988 draft. He played on various minor league teams before he made his professional debut late into the 1990 Detroit Tigers season on September 7, 1990, at the age of 26 as part of the team's late season expanded roster. While playing in the Major Leagues for the Detroit Tigers, Rowland also played intermittently on their Toledo Mud Hens minor league team and was occasionally called up to the Tigers when needed. In 1990, he played in only seven games, accumulating only three hits in 19 at-bats for a .158 batting average. He returned for the Tigers in 1991 as a backup catcher to Mickey Tettleton, who rarely missed a game. Because of that, Rowland saw very little playing time with two other backup catchers – Andy Allanson and Mark Salas – on the roster as well. That season, he played in only four games, accumulating only four at-bats, one hit, one run batted in, and a .250 batting average. Rowland saw similar playing time in 1992; he only played in six games, batting 14 times with three hits for a .214 batting average. Despite very little playing time, he was contracted for the league-minimum $120,000 that season but spent most of his time on assignment with minor league Toledo. In 1993, Rowland saw his most playing time on the Detroit Tigers. That year, primary catcher Mickey Tettleton played more time as a first baseman and outfielder, giving Rowland and fellow backup catcher Chad Kreuter more playing time. That year, Rowland played 21 games, accumulating 10 hits in 46 at-bats for a .217 batting average.

=== Boston Red Sox ===
On April 1, just prior to the start of the 1994 season, Rich Rowland was traded to the Boston Red Sox for catcher John Flaherty. The strike-shortened 1994 season would prove to be by far Rowland's best season. He played in 46 games, accumulating 118 at-bats, 27 hits, nine home runs (hitting his first Major League home run this year), 20 runs batted in, and a .229 batting average. He also posted a career high .483 slugging percentage, among other career highs this season. In 1995, Rowland played again on the Red Sox, who won American League East division that year. He played in only 14 games, accumulating 29 at-bats with five hits and a low .172 batting average. He played his final Major League game on June 15, 1995. He was sent back full-time to the Pawtucket Red Sox minor league team for the duration of the season. During the off-season, Rowland was granted free agency from the Red Sox and was acquired by the Toronto Blue Jays and later the San Francisco Giants – though he never played in the Major Leagues again.

== Personal life and death ==
Rowland died on August 25, 2026, at the age of 62. His sons played professional baseball.
