= Jeff Branson (baseball) =

American baseball player and coach (born 1967)

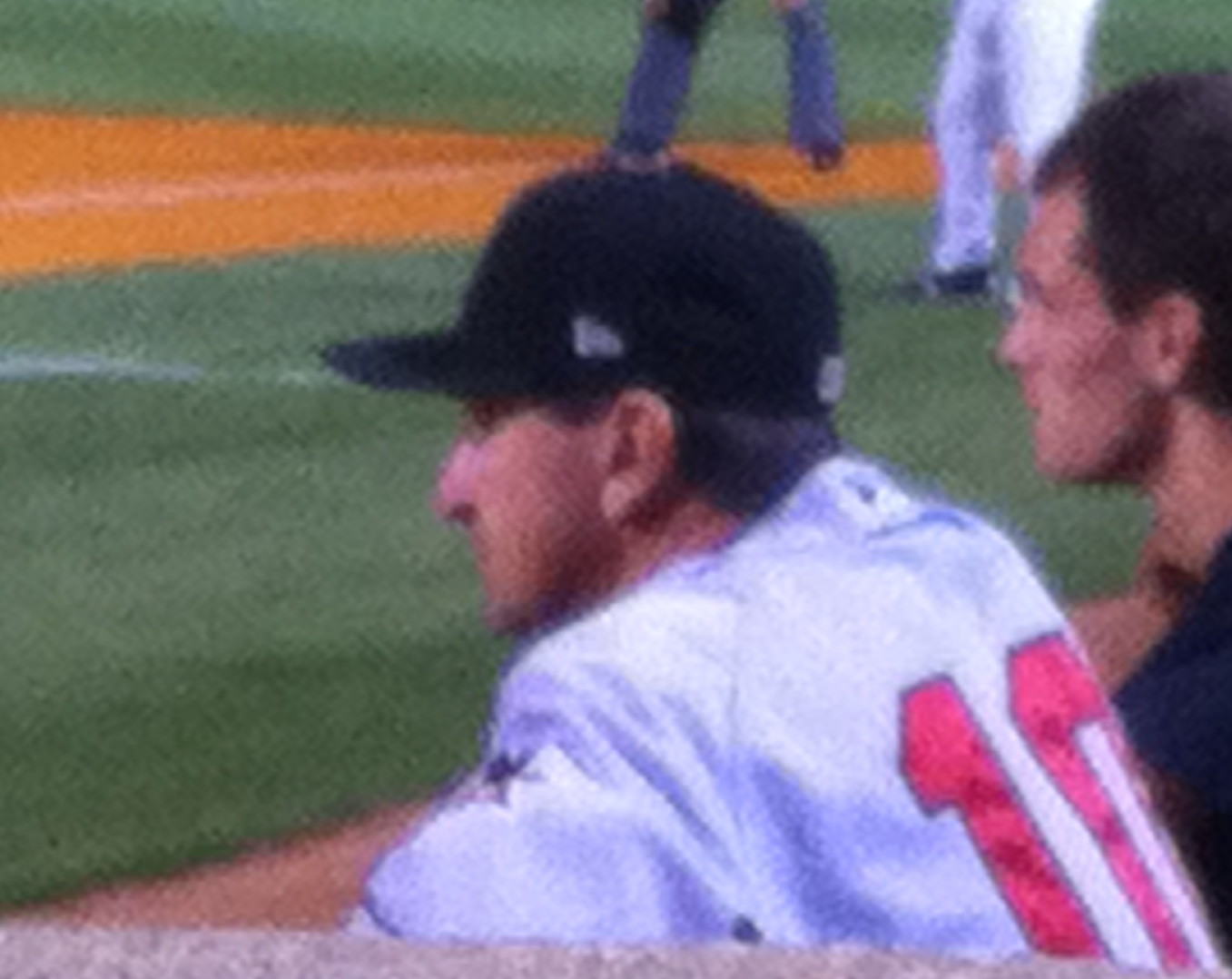
- Infielder
- Born: January 26, 1967 (age 59); Waynesboro, Mississippi, U.S.
- Batted: Left Threw: Right

MLB debut
- April 12, 1992, for the Cincinnati Reds

Last MLB appearance
- October 6, 2001, for the Los Angeles Dodgers

MLB statistics
- Batting average: .246
- Home runs: 34
- Runs batted in: 156
- Stats at Baseball Reference

Teams
- As player: Cincinnati Reds (1992–1997); Cleveland Indians (1997–1998); Los Angeles Dodgers (2000–2001); As coach: Pittsburgh Pirates (2013–2018)
Medals
Men's baseball
Representing United States
Olympic Games
| Gold medal – first place | 1988 Seoul | Team |

Jeffery Glenn Branson (born January 26, 1967) is an American former Major League Baseball infielder who is a Major League Baseball coach. He was the assistant hitting coach for the Pittsburgh Pirates in 2013 and the hitting coach from 2014 until 2018. He is currently the hitting coach for the Toledo Mud Hens.

== Early and personal life ==
Branson was born on January 26, 1967, in Waynesboro, Mississippi. He is an alumnus of Southern Choctaw High School in Silas, Alabama, and the University of West Alabama. He was drafted by the Cincinnati Reds in the second round of the 1988 MLB amateur draft.

== Career ==
Branson played for three different teams during his playing career: the Cincinnati Reds (1992–1997), Cleveland Indians (1997–1998), and Los Angeles Dodgers (2000–2001). He made his Major League Baseball debut April 12, 1992 and played his final game October 6, 2001.

== Coaching career ==
On November 18, 2013, Branson was named hitting coach of the Pittsburgh Pirates. He was previously the assistant hitting coach in 2013. He was relieved of this position on October 1, 2018.

Sporting positions
| Preceded by Mark Strittmatter | Pittsburgh Pirates assistant hitting coach 2013 | Succeeded by Jeff Livesey |
| Preceded by Gregg Ritchie | Pittsburgh Pirates hitting coach 2014–2018 | Succeeded by Rick Eckstein |
