= Brent Headrick =

American baseball player (born 1997)

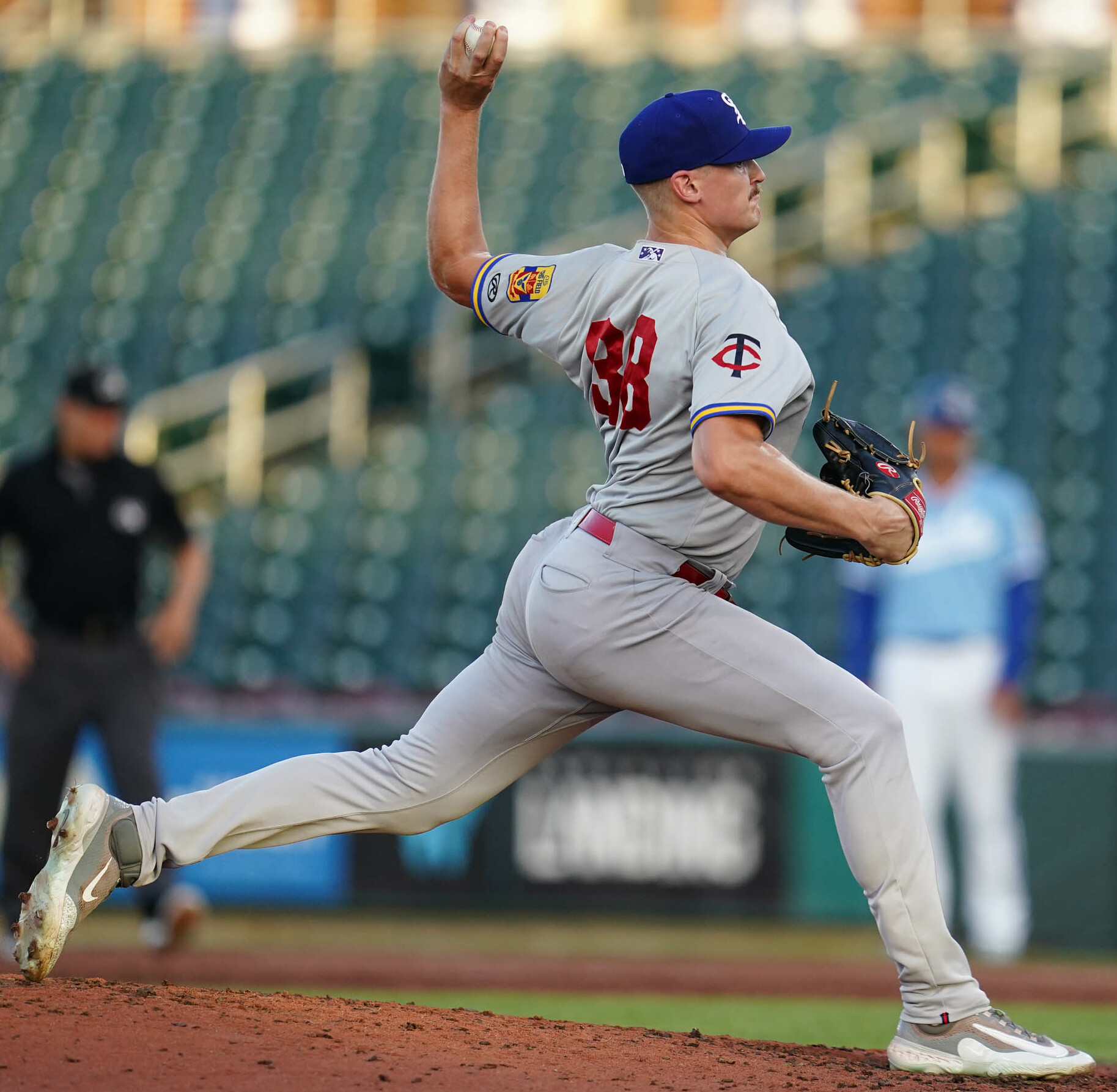
- Headrick with the St. Paul Saints in 2023

New York Yankees – No. 47
- Pitcher
- Born: December 17, 1997 (age 28); Braidwood, Illinois, U.S.
- Bats: Left Throws: Left

MLB debut
- April 19, 2023, for the Minnesota Twins

MLB statistics (through 2026 season)
- Win–loss record: 10–4
- Earned run average: 3.18
- Strikeouts: 1613
- Stats at Baseball Reference

Teams
- Minnesota Twins (2023–2024); New York Yankees (2025–present)

Brent Wayne Headrick (born December 17, 1997) is an American professional baseball pitcher for the New York Yankees of Major League Baseball (MLB). He has previously played in MLB for the Minnesota Twins.

== Career ==
=== Amateur career ===
Headrick attended Reed-Custer High School in Braidwood, Illinois, and Illinois State University, where he played college baseball for the Illinois State Redbirds. In 2018, he played collegiate summer baseball for the Wisconsin Woodchucks of the Northwoods League.

=== Minnesota Twins ===
The Minnesota Twins selected Headrick in the ninth round, with the 269th overall selection, of the 2019 Major League Baseball draft. He made his professional debut with the rookie–level Elizabethton Twins, making three scoreless appearances in his inaugural campaign.

Headrick did not play in a game in 2020 due to the cancellation of the minor league season because of the COVID-19 pandemic. In 2021, he spent the majority of the year with the Single–A Fort Myers Mighty Mussels, also making a single start for the rookie–level Florida Complex League Twins. In 15 games (14 starts) for Fort Myers, Headrick logged a 3.82 ERA with 86 strikeouts in 61 1/3 innings pitched. In 2022, Headrick made 25 appearances (23 starts) split between the High–A Cedar Rapids Kernels and the Double–A Wichita Wind Surge. In 108 1/3 innings of work, he posted a 10–5 record and 3.32 ERA with 136 strikeouts.

On November 15, 2022, the Twins added Headrick to their 40-man roster to protect him from the Rule 5 draft. Headrick was optioned to the Triple-A St. Paul Saints to begin the 2023 season. On April 16, 2023, Headrick was recalled and promoted to the major leagues for the first time. He made his MLB debut on April 19, earning the save. In 14 games for Minnesota, Headrick posted a 6.31 ERA with 30 strikeouts across 25 2/3 innings pitched.

Headrick was again optioned to Triple–A St. Paul to begin the 2024 season. He made only one appearance for Minnesota in 2024, tossing three innings of one-run ball against the Boston Red Sox in a 1-8 defeat.

=== New York Yankees ===
On February 11, 2025, Headrick was claimed off waivers by the New York Yankees.
