= John Flaherty =

American baseball player and broadcaster (born 1967)

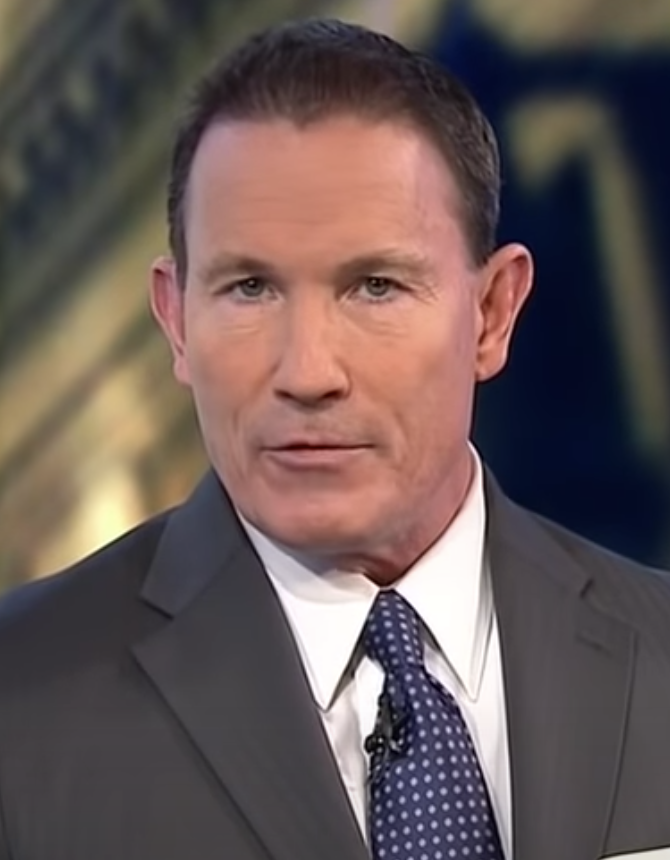
- Flaherty in 2019
- Catcher
- Born: October 21, 1967 (age 58); New York City, New York, U.S.
- Batted: Right Threw: Right

MLB debut
- April 12, 1992, for the Boston Red Sox

Last MLB appearance
- October 1, 2005, for the New York Yankees

MLB statistics
- Batting average: .252
- Home runs: 80
- Runs batted in: 395
- Stats at Baseball Reference

Teams
- Boston Red Sox (1992–1993); Detroit Tigers (1994–1996); San Diego Padres (1996–1997); Tampa Bay Devil Rays (1998–2002); New York Yankees (2003–2005)

John Timothy Flaherty (born October 21, 1967) is an American television baseball broadcaster and a former professional baseball catcher. He played for the Boston Red Sox, Detroit Tigers, San Diego Padres, Tampa Bay Devil Rays, and New York Yankees of Major League Baseball between 1992 and 2005. From 2005 to 2025 he was a broadcaster for the YES Network.

== Early life ==
Flaherty grew up in West Nyack, New York and graduated in 1985 from Saint Joseph Regional High School in Montvale, New Jersey. He went to grammar school at St. Anthony School in Nanuet, New York. He attended George Washington University, graduating in 1990 with a BA in Speech Communications and a minor in Psychology. He batted and threw right-handed. In 1987, he played collegiate summer baseball with the Harwich Mariners of the Cape Cod Baseball League.

== Professional career (1992–2005) ==
Drafted by the Boston Red Sox in 1988, he moved through the farm system and broke through with the Sox in 1992. He also played for the Red Sox in 1993, and in 1994 he was traded to the Detroit Tigers for Rich Rowland. In 1996, Flaherty had a 27-game hitting streak. This ranks as the third-longest hitting streak of all time by a catcher, behind only Sandy Alomar Jr.'s 30-game streak and Benito Santiago's 34-game streak.

In 1996, the Tigers traded Flaherty to the San Diego Padres, along with Chris Gomez, for Brad Ausmus, Andújar Cedeño, and a minor leaguer. In 1997, the Padres traded Flaherty to the Tampa Bay Devil Rays for Andy Sheets and Brian Boehringer. He played as the Devil Rays' everyday catcher through the 2002 season. As a member of the Devil Rays, he broke up a no-hitter by Pedro Martínez in the ninth inning.

In 2003, he signed as a free agent with the New York Yankees. With the Yankees, he served as a back-up to regular catcher Jorge Posada. He is best known for a 2004 pinch-hit game-winning single that ended a 13 inning game against the Boston Red Sox. In the 2005 season, Flaherty developed a good working relationship with pitcher Randy Johnson, and was paired with Johnson for most of the pitcher's starts that season.

He rejoined the Red Sox in December 2005, but announced his retirement March 7, 2006, during spring training with the team.

Flaherty's career stats include a .252 batting average in 1,047 games and 849 hits, including 80 home runs.

== Post-playing career ==
Flaherty participated in the 67th annual Yankees Old-Timers' Day on June 23, 2013, the first time he played on Old-Timers' Day. He also appeared from 2014 to 2019, and from 2022 to 2026.

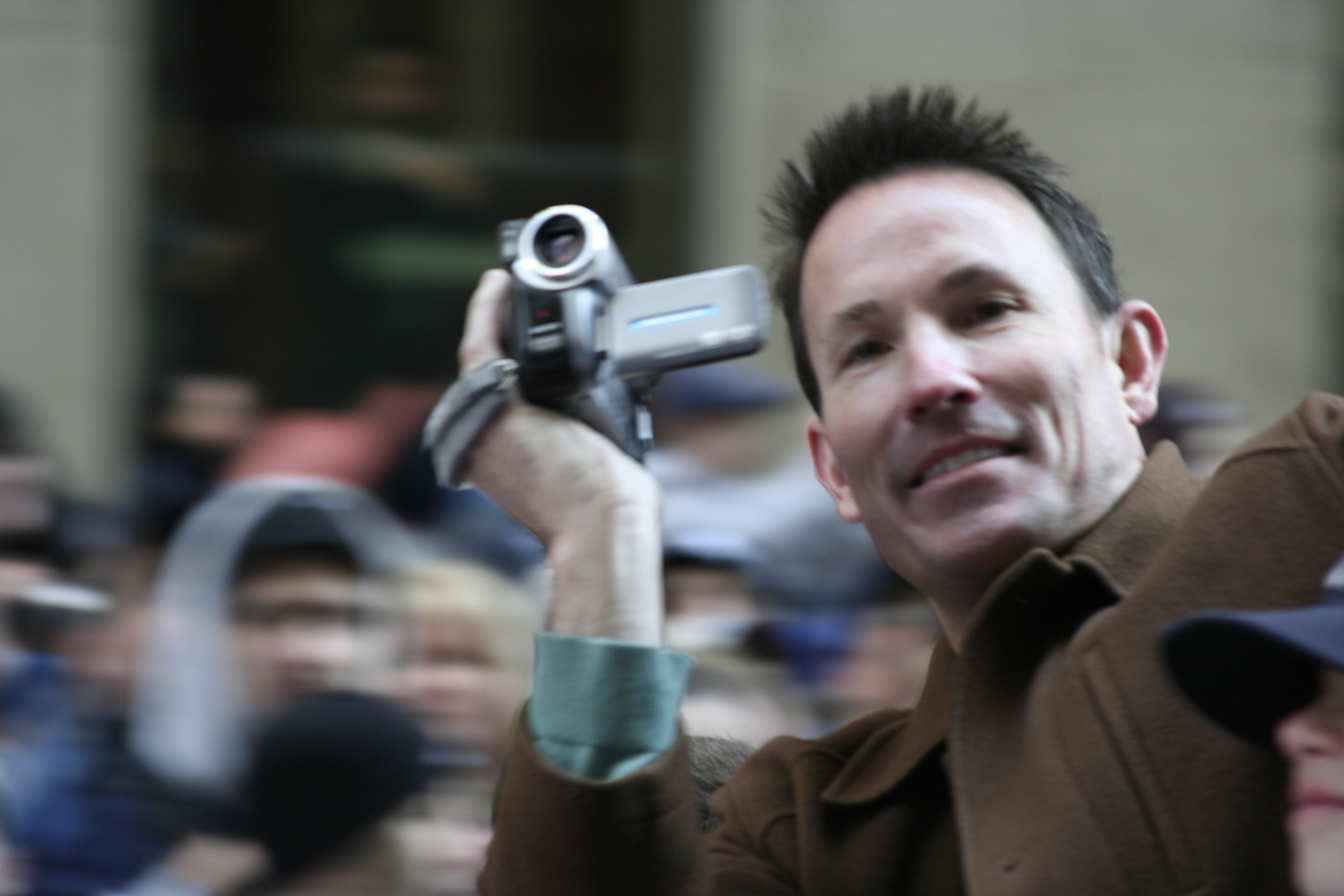
Flaherty during the 2009 World Series parade

=== New York Boulders ===
In 2011, Flaherty founded the New York Boulders (formerly the Rockland Boulders), a member of Frontier League. They play their home games at Clover Stadium in Rockland County, New York.

== Broadcasting career ==
Following his retirement, Flaherty joined the YES Network as a color analyst on Yankees telecasts. In addition to game commentary, Flaherty has also served the network as an analyst on the New York Yankees Pre-Game Show, Yankees Batting Practice Today, and the New York Yankees Post-Game Show. He has also appeared on the network's youth-oriented show Yankees on Deck.

On October 29, 2025, Flaherty revealed his contract was not renewed, and he would leave the YES Network after 20 years.

== Personal life ==
John Flaherty is known by the nickname "Flash."

On May 15, 2009, Flaherty was awarded an honorary Doctorate of Humane Letters from St. Thomas Aquinas College in Sparkill, New York.
