= Steve Wapnick =

American baseball player (born 1965)

- Pitcher
- Born: September 25, 1965 (age 60); Panorama City, California, U.S.
- Batted: Right Threw: Right

MLB debut
- April 14, 1990, for the Detroit Tigers

Last MLB appearance
- October 4, 1991, for the Chicago White Sox

MLB statistics
- Win–loss record: 0–1
- Earned run average: 4.50
- Strikeouts: 7
- Stats at Baseball Reference

Teams
- Detroit Tigers (1990); Chicago White Sox (1991)

Steven Lee Wapnick (born September 25, 1965) is an American former Major League Baseball pitcher. He played for the Detroit Tigers and the Chicago White Sox. He held batters to a .222 batting average, holding righties to a .115 batting average.

== Early life ==
Wapnick was born in Panorama City, California, and is Jewish. He attended Monroe High School in Sepulveda, California. He then attended Moorpark College and Fresno State University, where he pitched for the Bulldogs, and he threw and batted right-handed.

== Amateur draft ==
Wapnick, who was 6 ft 2 in (1.88 m) and 200 pounds, was drafted three times. Each time, his place in the draft slipped. The San Diego Padres drafted him in the second round of the 1985 Major League Baseball draft. When he did not sign with them, the Oakland Athletics drafted him in fifth round of the June Secondary Phase, but again he didn't sign. Finally, he was drafted in 1987 by the Toronto Blue Jays, but not until round 30. He finally signed with them, and reported to the minor league St. Catharines Blue Jays shortly thereafter.

== Professional career ==
=== Detroit Tigers ===
On December 4, 1989, Wapnick was drafted from the Blue Jays by the Detroit Tigers in the Rule 5 Draft. His first Major League game was April 14, 1990 at the age of 24. He appeared in just four games for the Tigers, posting an ERA of 6.43, and was returned to the Blue Jays on May 1.

=== Chicago White Sox ===
After spending most of the 1991 season with the Blue Jays top farm club, the Syracuse Chiefs, with whom he led the International League in saves with 20, on September 4 Wapnick was sent to the Chicago White Sox as the player to be named later in a deal that involved Shawn Jeter going to the Sox for outfielder Cory Snyder. Now wearing uniform number 51, Wapnick appeared in six more games for Chicago down the stretch, winning none and losing one with an ERA of 1.80. He never appeared in the majors again.

=== Back to the minors ===
He injured his arm in 1992 during spring training, which was the beginning of the end for his career. He pitched two more seasons in the minors, one in the White Sox organization and one for the Seattle Mariners top farm team, the Calgary Cannons.

Overall, in 12 career innings of work over 10 games, during 2 seasons, Wapnick walked 14 and struck out 7.

== Personal life ==
After his playing career, Wapnick coached at Clovis High School and Sierra High School, and also coached a Junior USA baseball team. He resides in Northern Colorado Where he coached at Resurrection Christian School for a number of years.

== See also ==
- List of Jewish Major League Baseball players
