= Shawn Holman =

American baseball player (born 1964)

- Pitcher
- Born: November 19, 1964 (age 60); Sewickley, Pennsylvania, U.S.
- Batted: Right Threw: Right

MLB debut
- September 5, 1989, for the Detroit Tigers

Last MLB appearance
- September 23, 1989, for the Detroit Tigers

MLB statistics
- Pitching Record: 0–0
- Earned run average: 1.80
- Strikeouts: 9
- Stats at Baseball Reference

Teams
- Detroit Tigers (1989)

Shawn Leroy Holman (born November 19, 1964) is a former baseball pitcher who appeared in five games for the Detroit Tigers in 1989.
