= Rob Richie (baseball) =

American baseball player (born 1965)

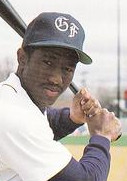
- Richie in 1988
- Left fielder
- Born: September 5, 1965 (age 60); Reno, Nevada, U.S.
- Batted: Left Threw: Right

MLB debut
- August 19, 1989, for the Detroit Tigers

Last MLB appearance
- September 26, 1989, for the Detroit Tigers

MLB statistics
- Batting average: .265
- Home runs: 1
- Runs batted in: 10
- Stats at Baseball Reference

Teams
- Detroit Tigers (1989)

Robert Eugene Richie (born September 5, 1965) is an American former Major League Baseball left fielder who played for the Detroit Tigers in 1989.

Richie was considered a top prospect, but he shocked the Tigers when he announced after the 1989 season that he was retiring to become a probation officer and to be able to focus more on his faith as a Jehovah’s Witness.
