= Frank Williams (pitcher) =

American baseball player (1958–2009)

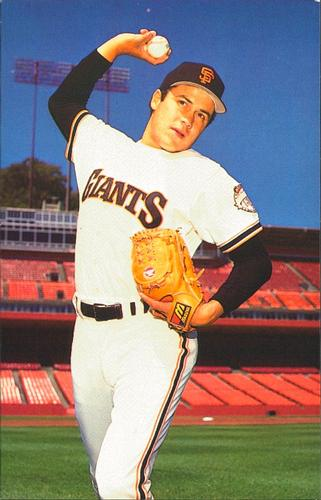
- Pitcher
- Born: February 13, 1958; Seattle, Washington, U.S.
- Died: January 9, 2009 (aged 50); Victoria, British Columbia, Canada
- Batted: Right Threw: Right

MLB debut
- April 5, 1984, for the San Francisco Giants

Last MLB appearance
- September 27, 1989, for the Detroit Tigers

MLB statistics
- Win–loss record: 24–14
- Earned run average: 3.00
- Strikeouts: 314
- Stats at Baseball Reference

Teams
- San Francisco Giants (1984–1986); Cincinnati Reds (1987–1988); Detroit Tigers (1989)

Frank Lee Williams (February 13, 1958 – January 9, 2009) was a major league baseball player from 1984 through 1989.

Williams and his twin brother Francis, of Tseshaht First Nation heritage, were placed for adoption at birth, and after some years in foster homes were raised in suburban Kirkland, Washington by Boeing engineer Dick McCullough. Williams attended Shoreline Community College in Seattle, then Lewis-Clark State College in Idaho, where he attracted the attention of scouts (and engaged in amateur tough man boxing in the offseason).

Williams was drafted by the San Francisco Giants in the 11th round of the 1979 amateur draft, and, after pitching for Great Falls, Fresno, Shreveport, and Phoenix, made his major league debut in 1984. A middle reliever, he pitched a shutout in his rookie season but started no other games and was credited with just eight saves over his six-season, 333-game career.

His best season was 1986, when he had a 1.20 earned run average, and, with 34 singles and one double given up in 52.1 innings, a defensive isolated power percentage (slugging percentage allowed minus batting average allowed, a measure of extra bases allowed on hits) of .006 – as of 2014, the lowest such percentage of anyone pitching 50 or more innings in records going back to 1957. He was traded in the offseason to the Cincinnati Reds and finished with the Detroit Tigers in 1989. He created the “slurve”, a slow side arm curve ball. Frank was known for his side arm and fast pitch.

After baseball, Williams suffered various misfortunes including a serious car accident, the breakup of his marriage, and the death of his twin brother. He struggled with alcoholism, and eventually became homeless. He died in Victoria, British Columbia, in January 2009 after suffering a heart attack and complications from pneumonia. He is remembered by a son, Tyler Lee Williams, and a daughter, Lyndsay Kae Williams, both of Kendrick, Idaho.
