= Randy Bockus =

American baseball player (born 1960)

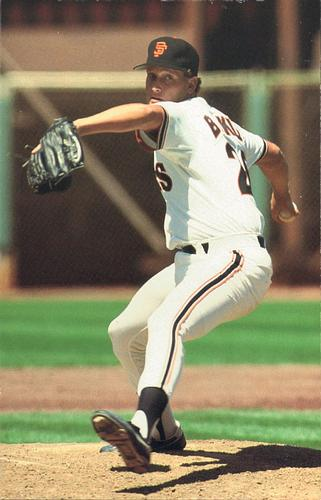
- Pitcher
- Born: October 5, 1960 (age 65); Canton, Ohio, U.S.
- Batted: Left Threw: Right

MLB debut
- September 10, 1986, for the San Francisco Giants

Last MLB appearance
- May 27, 1989, for the Detroit Tigers

MLB statistics
- Win–loss record: 2–1
- Earned run average: 4.23
- Strikeouts: 33
- Stats at Baseball Reference

Teams
- San Francisco Giants (1986–1988); Detroit Tigers (1989)

Randy Walter Bockus (born October 5, 1960) is an American former professional baseball pitcher. He played parts of four seasons in Major League Baseball (MLB), from 1986 to 1989.

== Career ==
Originally from Canton, Ohio, and an alumnus of Kent State University, Bockus made his major league debut on September 10, 1986, for the San Francisco Giants. He went on to appear in 39 games for the San Francisco Giants and Detroit Tigers as a pitcher, and one as a pinch hitter and outfielder.

=== Day in the outfield ===
In the fourth game of his major league career, he was involved in an unusual situation. On September 28, 1986, Giants regular second baseman Robby Thompson was suffering from a back injury, but had come in to play the field in the 12th inning of a game against the Los Angeles Dodgers. Unable to bat, he was pinch-hit for by Bockus, who at that point had not yet batted in the major leagues. Bockus struck out against Joe Beckwith, then stayed in the game to play the outfield. He played one inning, alternating between left and right field with Mike Aldrete, until being pinch-hit for himself by another pitcher, Mike Krukow. The Giants wound up winning the game in 16 innings.
