= Mike Schwabe =

American baseball player (born 1964)

- Pitcher
- Born: July 12, 1964 (age 61); Fort Dodge, Iowa, U.S.
- Batted: Right Threw: Right

MLB debut
- May 27, 1989, for the Detroit Tigers

Last MLB appearance
- July 20, 1990, for the Detroit Tigers

MLB statistics
- Win–loss record: 2–4
- Earned run average: 5.77
- Strikeouts: 14
- Stats at Baseball Reference

Teams
- Detroit Tigers (1989–1990)

Michael Scott Schwabe (born July 12, 1964) is an American former pitcher in Major League Baseball who played for the Detroit Tigers in 1989 and 1990. Prior to being drafted in the 1987 amateur draft, Schwabe played for Arizona State University.
