= Rick Schu =

American baseball player and coach (born 1962)

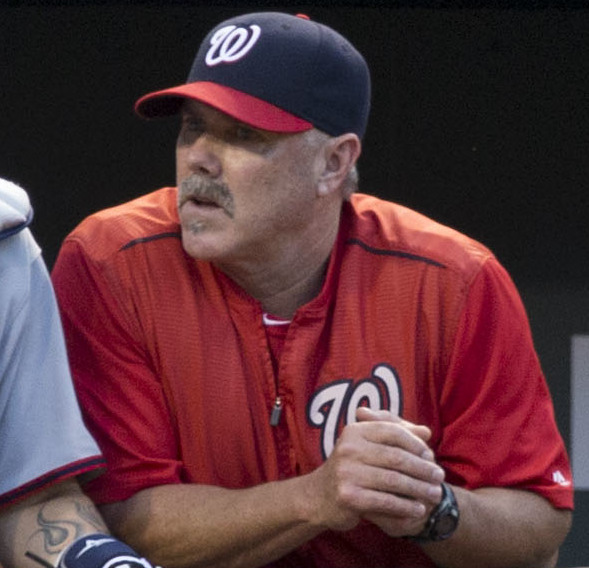
- Schu with the Washington Nationals in 2015
- Third baseman
- Born: January 26, 1962 (age 64); Philadelphia, Pennsylvania, U.S.
- Batted: Right Threw: Right

Professional debut
- MLB: September 1, 1984, for the Philadelphia Phillies
- NPB: April 10, 1993, for the Nippon Ham Fighters

Last appearance
- MLB: August 14, 1996, for the Montreal Expos
- NPB: October 4, 1994, for the Nippon Ham Fighters

MLB statistics
- Batting average: .246
- Home runs: 41
- Runs batted in: 134

NPB statistics
- Batting average: .257
- Home runs: 38
- Runs batted in: 124
- Stats at Baseball Reference

Teams
- As player: Philadelphia Phillies (1984–1987); Baltimore Orioles (1988–1989); Detroit Tigers (1989); California Angels (1990); Philadelphia Phillies (1991); Nippon Ham Fighters (1993–1994); Montreal Expos (1996); As coach: Arizona Diamondbacks (2004, 2007–2009); Washington Nationals (2013–2017); San Francisco Giants (2018–2019)

Richard Spencer Schu (born January 26, 1962) is an American former professional baseball third baseman and coach who played in Major League Baseball (MLB) for the Philadelphia Phillies (1984–1987, 1991), Baltimore Orioles (1988–1989), Detroit Tigers (1989), California Angels (1990), and Montreal Expos (1996). Schu also played in the Nippon Professional Baseball (NPB) for the Nippon Ham Fighters (1993–1994).

== Playing career ==
Schu grew up in Fair Oaks, California, and was signed as an amateur free agent out of Del Campo High School by the Philadelphia Phillies.

Schu made his Major League debut at Veterans Stadium on September 1, 1984, starting at third base for the Phillies, and went 0-3. He returned to the major leagues in May 1985 after hitting .284 for the Portland Beavers, and replaced future Hall of Famer Mike Schmidt at third base, with Schmidt moving to first. After Schu hit .252 with seven home runs in 1985 and 1986, Schmidt returned to third and Schu became a bench player. After four seasons with the Phillies, he joined the Baltimore Orioles, and played for them, the Detroit Tigers and the California Angels before returning to Philadelphia in 1991.

== Coaching career ==
On July 11, 2007, Schu replaced Kevin Seitzer as the hitting coach for the Arizona Diamondbacks. Schu continued in this role until May 7, 2009.

On November 4, 2009, the Washington Nationals announced the hiring of Schu to be an organizational hitting instructor. He became their hitting coach on Monday July 22, 2013 after the Nationals fired Rick Eckstein. His contract expired after the 2017 season. On November 9, 2017, Schu was hired as the assistant hitting coach for the San Francisco Giants.

| Preceded by Rick Eckstein | Washington Nationals hitting coach 2013–2017 | Succeeded by Kevin Long |
