= Randy Nosek =

American baseball player (born 1967)

- Pitcher
- Born: January 8, 1967 (age 58); Omaha, Nebraska, U.S.
- Batted: Right Threw: Right

MLB debut
- May 27, 1989, for the Detroit Tigers

Last MLB appearance
- October 2, 1990, for the Detroit Tigers

MLB statistics
- Win–loss record: 1–3
- Earned run average: 10.22
- Strikeouts: 7
- Stats at Baseball Reference

Teams
- Detroit Tigers (1989–1990)

Randall William Nosek (born January 8, 1967) is an American former Major League Baseball pitcher. Nosek played for the Detroit Tigers in 1989 and 1990.
