= Doug Strange =

American baseball player (born 1964)

- Third baseman / Second baseman
- Born: April 13, 1964 (age 62); Greenville, South Carolina, U.S.
- Batted: Switch Threw: Right

MLB debut
- July 13, 1989, for the Detroit Tigers

Last MLB appearance
- September 27, 1998, for the Pittsburgh Pirates

MLB statistics
- Batting average: .233
- Home runs: 31
- Runs batted in: 211
- Stats at Baseball Reference

Teams
- Detroit Tigers (1989); Chicago Cubs (1991–1992); Texas Rangers (1993–1994); Seattle Mariners (1995–1996); Montreal Expos (1997); Pittsburgh Pirates (1998)

Joseph Douglas Strange (born April 13, 1964) is an American former Major League Baseball (MLB) infielder who played for several teams from 1989 to 1998. He is currently a scout for the Pittsburgh Pirates, his final MLB team

== Playing career ==
A native of Greenville, South Carolina, Strange attended North Carolina State University, where he played college baseball for the NC State Wolfpack. In 1984, he played collegiate summer baseball with the Falmouth Commodores of the Cape Cod Baseball League.

Strange played for six MLB different ballclubs during his career: the Detroit Tigers (1989), Chicago Cubs (1991–1992), Texas Rangers (1993–1994), Seattle Mariners (1995–1996), Montreal Expos (1997), and Pittsburgh Pirates (1998). He made his MLB debut on July 13, 1989 and played his final game on September 27, 1998. His career batting average was .233.

The Tigers drafted Strange in the seventh round of the 1987 MLB draft. After playing 64 games for the Tigers in his rookie season in 1989, Detroit traded him to the Houston Astros for Lou Frazier on March 30, 1990. Houston released him that May. He then signed with the Cubs and returned to the majors in 1991. He reached free agency after the 1992 season and signed with Texas. He set several career highs in 1993, playing in 145 games, driving in 60 runs, and stealing six bases. He signed with Seattle in April 1995 and made his only postseason appearance that fall, batting 0-for-8 in six games for the Mariners. He did have one postseason RBI after a bases loaded walk that tied the game in the 8th when the team was facing elimination (The Mariners went on to win in extra innings). He signed as a free agent with Montreal in 1997, hitting a career-high 12 home runs that season.

== Post-playing career ==
Strange currently works as a scout for the Pittsburgh Pirates.
