= 1992 Toronto Blue Jays season =

1992 Toronto Blue Jays
- World Series champions American League champions American League East champions
- League: American League
- Division: East
- Ballpark: SkyDome
- City: Toronto
- Record: 96–66 (.592)
- Divisional place: 1st
- Owners: Labatt Breweries, Canadian Imperial Bank of Commerce, Paul Beeston (CEO)
- General managers: Pat Gillick
- Managers: Cito Gaston
- Television: CFTO-TV 9 (Don Chevrier, Tommy Hutton, Fergie Olver); The Sports Network (Jim Hughson, Buck Martinez)
- Radio: CJCL–AM 1430 (Tom Cheek, Jerry Howarth)

The 1992 Toronto Blue Jays season was the franchise's 16th season of Major League Baseball. Toronto finished first in the American League East for the fourth time with a record of 96 wins and 66 losses, closing the season with an attendance record of 4,028,318. Toronto was not swept in a single series all year, becoming the first team in 49 years to accomplish the feat.

In the American League Championship Series, the Blue Jays defeated the Oakland Athletics in six games for their first American League pennant in four tries. In the World Series, Toronto faced the Atlanta Braves, who had won their second straight National League pennant, but lost the previous year's World Series. The Blue Jays prevailed in six games, becoming the first non-U.S.-based team to win a World Series. They were the first Toronto based team in a major professional sports league to win a championship since the 1967 Toronto Maple Leafs.

== Transactions ==
Transactions by the Toronto Blue Jays during the off-season before the 1992 season.

=== October 1991 ===
October 15	Ravelo Manzanillo granted free agency. Efraín Valdez granted free agency.
October 16	Mickey Weston granted free agency.
October 26	Frank Wills granted free agency.
October 28	Released Cory Snyder.
October 29	Mookie Wilson granted free agency.
October 31	Jim Acker granted free agency (signed with Seattle Mariners on February 2, 1992, to a one-year, $275,000 contract).

=== November 1991 ===
November 4	Dave Parker granted free agency.
November 7	Tom Candiotti granted free agency (signed with Los Angeles Dodgers on December 3, 1991, to a four-year, $15.5 million contract).
November 18	Rene Gonzales granted free agency (signed with California Angels on January 10, 1992, to a one-year, $300,000 contract).

=== December 1991 ===
December 11	Signed free agent Butch Davis from the Los Angeles Dodgers to a contract.
December 12	Signed free agent Eric Plunk from the New York Yankees to a contract.
December 18	Signed free agent Jack Morris from the Minnesota Twins to a two-year, $10.85 million contract.
December 19	Signed free agent Dave Winfield from the California Angels to a one-year, $2.3 million contract.

=== February 1992 ===
February 8	Re-signed Roberto Alomar to a four-year, $18.5 million contract.

=== March 1992 ===
March 19	Signed free agent Alfredo Griffin from the Los Angeles Dodgers to a one-year, $637,500 contract.
March 20	Vince Horsman selected off of waivers by the Oakland Athletics.
March 27	Released Eric Plunk.

=== April 1992 ===
April 3	Selected Shawn Hillegas off of waivers from the Cleveland Indians.
April 4	Shawn Hillegas granted free agency (signed a contract with the New York Yankees on April 9, 1992).

== Spring training ==
The Toronto Blue Jays spent their 16th spring training at Dunedin, Florida, while playing their home exhibition games at Dunedin Stadium at Grant Field for the 3rd spring training season.

== Regular season ==
Despite their post-season success, the Blue Jays had many ups and downs during the regular season. The Jays started off winning the first six games of the regular season and Roberto Alomar was named the AL Player of the Month for the month of April.

On August 25, they had lost six of their last seven games and were only two games ahead of the Baltimore Orioles in the standings. At this point, general manager Pat Gillick decided to acquire a fiery right-hander from the New York Mets named David Cone. The trade resulted in the Jays sending minor league prospect Ryan Thompson and utility infielder Jeff Kent to the Mets. The deal sent the message that the Blue Jays were committed to winning. Cone would have 4 wins, 3 losses and a 2.55 ERA.

The regular season also marked the end of the road for Dave Stieb, who made his last start for the Blue Jays on August 8 and only lasted three innings. On September 23, Stieb announced that he was finished for the season. 1992 was Stieb's final season for the Jays before briefly coming out of retirement years later.

Four days later, on September 27, Jack Morris would make club history by becoming the first pitcher in franchise history to win 20 games in a season. Morris would have to wait through a two-hour rain delay at Yankee Stadium to get the win.

Heading into the last weekend of the season, only the Milwaukee Brewers were still in contention. Led by manager Phil Garner, the Brewers had won 22 of 29 games since August 29. The Brewers trailed the Blue Jays by 2 games, and the Jays were heading into a weekend series vs. the Detroit Tigers. On October 3, Juan Guzmán had a one-hitter through eight innings and Duane Ward picked up the save as the Jays won the game 3-1 and clinched the American League East Division title.

=== Season standings ===
AL East
Team	W	L	Pct.	GB	Home	Road
Toronto Blue Jays	96	66	.593	—	53‍–‍28	43‍–‍38
Milwaukee Brewers	92	70	.568	4	53‍–‍28	39‍–‍42
Baltimore Orioles	89	73	.549	7	43‍–‍38	46‍–‍35
Cleveland Indians	76	86	.469	20	41‍–‍40	35‍–‍46
New York Yankees	76	86	.469	20	41‍–‍40	35‍–‍46
Detroit Tigers	75	87	.463	21	38‍–‍42	37‍–‍45
Boston Red Sox	73	89	.451	23	44‍–‍37	29‍–‍52

	Record			Games Left		
Opponent	Home	Road	Total	Home	Road	Total
AL East
Baltimore Orioles	5–2	3–3	8–5	–	–	–
Boston Red Sox	3–3	3–4	6–7	–	–	–
Cleveland Indians	4–3	3–3	7–6	–	–	–
Detroit Tigers	4–2	4–3	8–5	–	–	–
Milwaukee Brewers	3–3	2–5	5–8	–	–	–
New York Yankees	6–1	5–1	11–2	–	–	–
Totals	25–14	20–19	45–33	–	–	–
AL West
California Angels	5–1	2–4	7–5	–	–	–
Chicago White Sox	5–1	2–4	7–5	–	–	–
Kansas City Royals	4–2	3–3	7–5	–	–	–
Minnesota Twins	4–2	3–3	7–5	–	–	–
Oakland Athletics	3–3	3–3	6–6	–	–	–
Seattle Mariners	3–3	5–1	8–4	–	–	–
Texas Rangers	4–2	5–1	9–3	–	–	–
Totals	28–14	23–19	51–33	–	–	–
Grand Totals	53–28	43–38	96–66	–	–	–

Month	Games	Won	Lost	Pct.
April	23	16	7	.696
May	27	15	12	.556
June	26	14	12	.538
July	26	16	10	.615
August	30	14	16	.467
September	27	18	9	.667
October	3	3	0	1.000
Totals	162	96	66	.593

=== Record vs. opponents ===
1992 American League record Sources:
Team	BAL	BOS	CAL	CWS	CLE	DET	KC	MIL	MIN	NYY	OAK	SEA	TEX	TOR
Baltimore	—	8–5	8–4	6–6	7–6	10–3	8–4	6–7	6–6	5–8	6–6	7–5	7–5	5–8
Boston	5–8	—	8–4	6–6	6–7	4–9	7–5	5–8	3–9	7–6	5–7	6–6	4–8	7–6
California	4–8	4–8	—	3–10	6–6	7–5	8–5	5–7	2–11	7–5	5–8	7–6	9–4	5–7
Chicago	6–6	6–6	10–3	—	7–5	10–2	7–6	5–7	8–5	8–4	5–8	4–9	5–8	5–7
Cleveland	6–7	7–6	6–6	5–7	—	5–8	5–7	5–8	6–6	7–6	6–6	7–5	5–7	6–7
Detroit	3–10	9–4	5–7	2–10	8–5	—	7–5	5–8	3–9	5–8	6–6	9–3	8–4	5–8
Kansas City	4–8	5–7	5–8	6–7	7–5	5–7	—	7–5	6–7	5–7	4–9	7–6	6–7	5–7
Milwaukee	7–6	8–5	7–5	7–5	8–5	8–5	5–7	—	6–6	6–7	7–5	8–4	7–5	8–5
Minnesota	6–6	9–3	11–2	5–8	6–6	9–3	7–6	6–6	—	7–5	5–8	8–5	6–7	5–7
New York	8–5	6–7	5–7	4–8	6–7	8–5	7–5	7–6	5–7	—	6–6	6–6	6–6	2–11
Oakland	6–6	7–5	8–5	8–5	6–6	6–6	9–4	5–7	8–5	6–6	—	12–1	9–4	6–6
Seattle	5–7	6–6	6–7	9–4	5–7	3–9	6–7	4–8	5–8	6–6	1–12	—	4–9	4–8
Texas	5–7	8–4	4–9	8–5	7–5	4–8	7–6	5–7	7–6	6–6	4–9	9–4	—	3–9
Toronto	8–5	6–7	7–5	7–5	7–6	8–5	7–5	5–8	7–5	11–2	6–6	8–4	9–3	—

=== Opening Day starters ===
- Devon White, CF
- Roberto Alomar, 2B
- Joe Carter, LF
- Dave Winfield, DH
- John Olerud, 1B
- Derek Bell, RF
- Kelly Gruber, 3B
- Pat Borders, C
- Manuel Lee, SS
- Jack Morris, P

=== Transactions ===
Transactions for the Toronto Blue Jays during the 1992 regular season.

==== June 1992 ====
June 15	Signed amateur free agent Brad Cornett to a contract.

==== July 1992 ====
July 9	Signed amateur free agent Kelvim Escobar to a contract.
July 30	Acquired Mark Eichhorn from the California Angels for Rob Ducey and Greg Myers.

==== August 1992 ====
August 1	Signed free agent Terry McGriff from the California Angels to a contract.
August 27	Acquired David Cone from the New York Mets for Jeff Kent and a player to be named later (Ryan Thompson on September 1, 1992).

=== Roster ===
1992 Toronto Blue Jays
Roster
Pitchers: 11 David Cone; 48 Mark Eichhorn; 66 Juan Guzmán; 50 Tom Henke; 41 Pat Hentgen; 22 Jimmy Key; 28 Al Leiter; 26 Doug Linton; 45 Bob MacDonald; 47 Jack Morris; 37 Dave Stieb; 30 Todd Stottlemyre; 40 Mike Timlin; 35 Ricky Trlicek; 31 Duane Ward; 53 David Weathers; 36 David Wells	Catchers: 10 Pat Borders; 27 Randy Knorr; 21 Greg Myers; 33 Ed Sprague; Infielders: 12 Roberto Alomar; 4 Alfredo Griffin; 17 Kelly Gruber; 11 Jeff Kent; 2 Manuel Lee; 21 Mike Maksudian; 19 Domingo Martínez; 9 John Olerud; 16 Tom Quinlan; 15 Pat Tabler; 1 Eddie Zosky	Outfielders: 14 Derek Bell; 29 Joe Carter; 20 Rob Ducey; 23 Candy Maldonado; 24 Turner Ward; 25 Devon White; 32 Dave Winfield; Other batters: 5 Rance Mulliniks	Manager: 43 Cito Gaston; Coaches: 3 Bob Bailor (first base); 42 Galen Cisco (pitching); 7 Rich Hacker (third base); 39 Larry Hisle (hitting); 8 John Sullivan (bullpen); 18 Gene Tenace (bench)

=== Game log ===
Legend
Blue Jays win	Blue Jays loss	Game postponed

1992 Game Log: 96–66 (Home: 53–28; Road: 43–38)
April: 16–7 (Home: 11–4; Road: 5–3)

#	Date	Opponent	Score	Win	Loss	Save	Stadium	Attendance	Record	Report
1	April 6	@ Tigers	4–2	Morris (1–0)	Gullickson (0–1)		Tiger Stadium	51,068	1–0	W1
2	April 8	@ Tigers	10–9	Henke (1–0)	Tanana (0–1)	Ward (1)	Tiger Stadium	12,819	2–0	W2
3	April 9	@ Tigers	3–1	Guzmán (1–0)	Terrell (0–1)	Ward (2)	Tiger Stadium	9,720	3–0	W3
4	April 10	Orioles	4–3	Hentgen (1–0)	Olson (0–1)		SkyDome	50,424	4–0	W4
5	April 11	Orioles	7–2	Morris (2–0)	Sutcliffe (1–1)		SkyDome	50,375	5–0	W5
6	April 12	Orioles	3–1	Wells (1–0)	Mesa (0–1)	Ward (3)	SkyDome	48,309	6–0	W6
7	April 13	Yankees	2–5	Howe (1–0)	Stottlemyre (0–1)	Farr (2)	SkyDome	44,115	6–1	L1
8	April 14	Yankees	12–6	Guzmán (2–0)	Johnson (0–1)		SkyDome	45,579	7–1	W1
9	April 15	Yankees	2–0	Key (1–0)	Pérez (1–1)	Henke (1)	SkyDome	48,111	8–1	W2
10	April 16	Yankees	7–6	Ward (1–0)	Farr (0–1)		SkyDome	50,376	9–1	W3
11	April 17	@ Red Sox	0–1	Clemens (2–1)	Wells (1–1)	Reardon (2)	Fenway Park	27,467	9–2	L1
12	April 18	@ Red Sox	2–1	Stottlemyre (1–1)	Viola (0–2)	Henke (2)	Fenway Park	32,640	10–2	W1
13	April 19	@ Red Sox	4–5	Darwin (1–0)	Henke (1–1)		Fenway Park	28,196	10–3	L1
14	April 20	@ Red Sox	6–4 (13)	MacDonald (1–0)	Bolton (0–1)		Fenway Park	34,709	11–3	W1
15	April 21	Indians	2–1	Morris (3–0)	Cook (0–2)		SkyDome	40,191	12–3	W2
16	April 22	Indians	2–7	Nagy (3–1)	Stieb (0–1)	Power (1)	SkyDome	43,292	12–4	L1
17	April 23	Indians	13–8	Stottlemyre (2–1)	Otto (1–2)		SkyDome	42,401	13–4	W1
18	April 24	Royals	4–3	Guzmán (3–0)	Gordon (0–2)	Henke (3)	SkyDome	50,352	14–4	W2
19	April 25	Royals	6–4	Hentgen (2–0)	Young (0–1)	Ward (4)	SkyDome	50,346	15–4	W3
20	April 26	Royals	0–9	Gubicza (1–2)	Morris (3–1)		SkyDome	46,486	15–5	L1
21	April 28	Angels	5–9	Finley (1–1)	Stieb (0–2)		SkyDome	46,201	15–6	L2
22	April 29	Angels	1–0	Stottlemyre (3–1)	Abbott (1–3)		SkyDome	47,356	16–6	W1
23	April 30	@ Brewers	2–3	Bosio (2–1)	Ward (1–1)	Henry (4)	County Stadium	8,877	16–7	L1

May: 15–12 (Home: 8–4; Road: 7–8)

#	Date	Opponent	Score	Win	Loss	Save	Stadium	Attendance	Record	Report
24	May 1	@ Brewers	3–4	Navarro (2–2)	Key (1–1)	Henry (5)	County Stadium	13,794	16–8	L2
25	May 2	@ Brewers	4–5	Fetters (1–0)	Morris (3–2)	Henry (6)	County Stadium	26,547	16–9	L3
26	May 3	@ Brewers	4–1	Stieb (1–2)	Wegman (2–2)		County Stadium	17,312	17–9	W1
27	May 4	@ Athletics	7–3	Stottlemyre (4–1)	Darling (1–2)		Oakland–Alameda County Coliseum	20,137	18–9	W2
28	May 5	@ Athletics	5–1	Guzmán (4–0)	Slusarski (2–1)	Ward (5)	Oakland–Alameda County Coliseum	18,753	19–9	W3
29	May 6	@ Mariners	12–4	Key (2–1)	Johnson (3–2)		Kingdome	12,771	20–9	W4
30	May 7	@ Mariners	8–7	Hentgen (3–0)	Schooler (0–2)	Henke (4)	Kingdome	13,347	21–9	W5
31	May 8	@ Angels	1–4	Eichhorn (1–2)	Stieb (1–3)		Anaheim Stadium	36,383	21–10	L1
32	May 9	@ Angels	1–2	Abbott (2–4)	Stottlemyre (4–2)	Harvey (10)	Anaheim Stadium	36,159	21–11	L2
33	May 10	@ Angels	4–1	Guzmán (5–0)	Grahe (2–3)		Anaheim Stadium	23,009	22–11	W1
34	May 12	Athletics	3–0	Key (3–1)	Stewart (2–3)	Henke (5)	SkyDome	50,407	23–11	W2
35	May 13	Athletics	4–3	Morris (4–2)	Moore (4–2)	Henke (6)	SkyDome	50,394	24–11	W3
36	May 14	Mariners	5–4	Stieb (2–3)	Jones (1–1)	Wells (1)	SkyDome	50,375	25–11	W4
37	May 15	Mariners	1–2	Fleming (5–1)	Stottlemyre (4–3)	Schooler (6)	SkyDome	50,405	25–12	L1
38	May 16	Mariners	6–7	Powell (1–0)	Wells (1–2)	Schooler (7)	SkyDome	50,385	25–13	L2
39	May 17	Mariners	2–3	Johnson (4–3)	Key (3–2)	Schooler (8)	SkyDome	50,364	25–14	L3
40	May 18	Twins	2–6 (11)	Wayne (1–1)	Ward (1–2)		SkyDome	50,391	25–15	L4
41	May 19	Twins	1–7	Mahomes (3–1)	Stieb (2–4)	Edens (1)	SkyDome	50,338	25–16	L5
42	May 20	Twins	8–7 (10)	Henke (2–1)	Aguilera (0–4)		SkyDome	50,125	26–16	W1
43	May 22	@ White Sox	6–2	Guzmán (6–0)	McDowell (7–2)	Ward (6)	Comiskey Park	37,446	27–16	W2
44	May 23	@ White Sox	2–5	Hibbard (5–2)	Key (3–3)	Thigpen (12)	Comiskey Park	39,293	27–17	L1
45	May 24	@ White Sox	1–8	McCaskill (3–4)	Morris (4–3)		Comiskey Park	32,230	27–18	L2
46	May 26	Brewers	5–4	Stieb (3–4)	Bones (1–2)	Henke (7)	SkyDome	49,360	28–18	W1
47	May 27	Brewers	4–8	Navarro (4–4)	Stottlemyre (4–4)	Henry (7)	SkyDome	50,376	28–19	L1
48	May 29	White Sox	3–0	Ward (2–2)	Hibbard (5–3)	Henke (8)	SkyDome	50,408	29–19	W1
49	May 30	White Sox	2–1 (11)	Wells (2–2)	Pall (2–2)		SkyDome	50,391	30–19	W2
50	May 31	White Sox	3–2	Morris (5–3)	Thigpen (0–2)		SkyDome	50,393	31–19	W3

June: 14–12 (Home: 5–4; Road: 9–3)

#	Date	Opponent	Score	Win	Loss	Save	Stadium	Attendance	Record	Report
51	June 1	@ Twins	5–3 (10)	Ward (3–2)	Willis (1–2)	Henke (9)	Hubert H. Humphrey Metrodome	20,134	32–19	W4
52	June 2	@ Twins	7–5 (13)	Hentgen (4–0)	Wayne (1–2)	Henke (10)	Hubert H. Humphrey Metrodome	22,317	33–19	W5
53	June 3	@ Twins	3–11	Tapani (6–4)	Guzmán (6–1)		Hubert H. Humphrey Metrodome	21,392	33–20	L1
54	June 5	@ Orioles	0–1	Sutcliffe (8–4)	Key (3–4)	Olson (14)	Oriole Park at Camden Yards	45,803	33–21	L2
55	June 6	@ Orioles	4–3	Morris (6–3)	McDonald (7–3)	Henke (11)	Oriole Park at Camden Yards	45,520	34–21	W1
56	June 7	@ Orioles	1–7	Mussina (7–1)	Stieb (3–5)		Oriole Park at Camden Yards	45,620	34–22	L1
57	June 8	@ Yankees	16–3	Stottlemyre (5–4)	Cadaret (3–5)		Yankee Stadium	18,166	35–22	W1
58	June 9	@ Yankees	2–1	Guzmán (7–1)	Leary (4–5)	Henke (12)	Yankee Stadium	22,429	36–22	W2
59	June 10	@ Yankees	10–3	Key (4–4)	Sanderson (4–4)	Wells (2)	Yankee Stadium	25,229	37–22	W3
60	June 11	Red Sox	4–0	Morris (7–3)	Clemens (9–4)		SkyDome	50,423	38–22	W4
61	June 12	Red Sox	0–5	Viola (6–4)	Stieb (3–6)		SkyDome	50,387	38–23	L1
62	June 13	Red Sox	3–5	Hesketh (3–3)	Stottlemyre (5–5)	Reardon (14)	SkyDome	50,397	38–24	L2
63	June 14	Red Sox	6–2	Guzmán (8–1)	Gardiner (3–6)	Ward (7)	SkyDome	50,412	39–24	W1
64	June 16	Tigers	3–4	Gullickson (8–4)	Key (4–5)	Henneman (10)	SkyDome	50,394	39–25	L1
65	June 17	Tigers	6–2	Morris (8–3)	Ritz (1–2)	Ward (8)	SkyDome	50,401	40–25	W1
66	June 18	Tigers	10–14	Munoz (1–1)	Timlin (0–1)	Henneman (11)	SkyDome	50,392	40–26	L1
67	June 19	@ Royals	4–11	Gubicza (7–4)	Stottlemyre (5–6)		Royals Stadium	23,942	40–27	L2
68	June 20	@ Royals	6–1	Guzmán (9–1)	Magnante (3–6)		Royals Stadium	29,194	41–27	W1
69	June 21	@ Royals	0–2	Appier (7–3)	Key (4–6)	Montgomery (16)	Royals Stadium	24,275	41–28	L1
70	June 22	@ Rangers	16–7	Morris (9–3)	Guzmán (6–5)		Arlington Stadium	24,460	42–28	W1
--	June 23	@ Rangers	Postponed (rain) Rescheduled for September 10							
71	June 24	@ Rangers	3–2	Wells (3–2)	Witt (8–6)	Henke (13)	Arlington Stadium	23,798	43–28	W2
72	June 26	@ Indians	6–1	Guzmán (10–1)	Armstrong (2–9)		Cleveland Stadium	16,299	44–28	W6
73	June 27	@ Indians	4–6	Plunk (1–0)	Ward (3–3)		Cleveland Stadium	40,560	44–29	L1
74	June 28	@ Indians	6–7	Olin (2–3)	Ward (3–4)	Plunk (1)	Cleveland Stadium	23,560	44–30	L2
75	June 29	Rangers	11–4	Hentgen (5–0)	Witt (8–7)		SkyDome	50,404	45–30	W1
76	June 30	Rangers	13–16	Brown (12–4)	Wells (3–3)		SkyDome	50,396	45–31	L1

July: 16–10 (Home: 12–4; Road: 4–6)

#	Date	Opponent	Score	Win	Loss	Save	Stadium	Attendance	Record	Report
77	July 1	Rangers	3–2 (10)	Ward (4–4)	Russell (2–3)		SkyDome	50,379	46–31	W1
78	July 3	Angels	10–1	Key (5–6)	Langston (8–6)		SkyDome	50,408	47–31	W2
79	July 4	Angels	8–6	Morris (10–3)	Eichhorn (1–4)	Henke (14)	SkyDome	50,418	48–31	W3
80	July 5	Angels	6–2	Wells (4–3)	Valera (4–8)		SkyDome	50,398	49–31	W4
81	July 6	Angels	3–0	Guzmán (11–1)	Abbott (4–11)	Henke (15)	SkyDome	50,406	50–31	W5
82	July 7	Mariners	4–3	Ward (5–4)	Nelson (0–4)		SkyDome	50,397	51–31	W6
83	July 8	Mariners	6–0	Key (6–6)	Hanson (6–11)		SkyDome	50,391	52–31	W7
84	July 9	Athletics	4–3	Henke (3–1)	Gossage (0–2)		SkyDome	50,402	53–31	W8
85	July 10	Athletics	1–5	Welch (7–4)	Wells (4–4)		SkyDome	50,399	53–32	L1
86	July 11	Athletics	1–3	Moore (10–7)	Guzmán (11–2)	Eckersley (30)	SkyDome	50,414	53–33	L2
87	July 12	Athletics	0–8	Darling (8–7)	Hentgen (5–1)		SkyDome	50,392	53–34	L3
	July 14	A.L. @ N.L. All-Star Game (AL wins—)	13–6	Brown (TEX)	Glavine (ATL)		Jack Murphy Stadium	59,372	San Diego, California	
88	July 16	@ Mariners	7–2	Morris (11–3)	Johnson (5–10)		Kingdome	52,711	54–34	W1
89	July 17	@ Mariners	6–8	Hanson (8–11)	Key (6–7)	Swan (6)	Kingdome	24,160	54–35	L1
90	July 18	@ Mariners	3–0	Guzmán (12–2)	Fleming (11–4)	Henke (16)	Kingdome	43,922	55–35	W1
91	July 19	@ Mariners	8–4	Wells (5–4)	DeLucia (3–6)		Kingdome	28,560	56–35	W2
92	July 20	@ Angels	3–5	Crim (4–2)	Hentgen (5–2)	Grahe (6)	Anaheim Stadium	21,090	56–36	L1
93	July 21	@ Angels	9–5	Morris (12–3)	Crim (4–3)	Ward (9)	Anaheim Stadium	21,581	57–36	W1
94	July 22	@ Angels	4–5	Grahe (3–3)	Key (6–8)		Anaheim Stadium	22,178	57–37	L1
95	July 23	@ Athletics	9–3	Stieb (4–6)	Moore (10–9)		Oakland–Alameda County Coliseum	24,707	58–37	W1
96	July 24	@ Athletics	5–6	Eckersley (3–0)	Henke (3–2)		Oakland–Alameda County Coliseum	30,206	58–38	L1
97	July 25	@ Athletics	0–6	Darling (9–8)	Stottlemyre (5–7)		Oakland–Alameda County Coliseum	36,086	58–39	L2
98	July 26	@ Athletics	1–9	Downs (2–2)	Morris (12–4)		Oakland–Alameda County Coliseum	34,595	58–40	L3
99	July 28	Royals	6–4	Key (7–8)	Moeller (0–1)	Henke (17)	SkyDome	50,392	59–40	W1
100	July 29	Royals	2–5	Appier (12–3)	Timlin (0–2)	Montgomery (25)	SkyDome	50,418	59–41	L1
101	July 30	Royals	3–0	Wells (6–4)	Aquino (1–2)	Henke (18)	SkyDome	50,417	60–41	W1
102	July 31	Yankees	13–2	Stottlemyre (6–7)	Hillegas (1–5)		SkyDome	50,407	61–41	W2

August: 14–16 (Home: 7–4; Road: 7–12)

#	Date	Opponent	Score	Win	Loss	Save	Stadium	Attendance	Record	Report
103	August 1	Yankees	3–1	Morris (13–4)	Pérez (9–10)	Henke (19)	SkyDome	50,420	62–41	W3
104	August 2	Yankees	7–6	Eichhorn (3–4)	Habyan (3–5)	Ward (10)	SkyDome	50,409	63–41	W4
105	August 3	@ Red Sox	1–7	Clemens (12–7)	Guzmán (12–3)		Fenway Park	34,024	63–42	L1
106	August 4	@ Red Sox	4–9	Hesketh (6–8)	Wells (6–5)	Harris (2)	Fenway Park	33,294	63–43	L2
107	August 5	@ Red Sox	5–4	Eichhorn (4–4)	Irvine (2–1)	Henke (20)	Fenway Park	33,945	64–43	W1
108	August 6	@ Tigers	15–11	Morris (14–4)	Tanana (9–7)		Tiger Stadium	27,969	65–43	W2
109	August 7	@ Tigers	2–7	Gullickson (13–7)	Key (7–9)		Tiger Stadium	29,994	65–44	L1
110	August 8	@ Tigers	6–8	Kiely (4–1)	Linton (0–1)	Henneman (19)	Tiger Stadium	39,344	65–45	L2
111	August 9	@ Tigers	2–9	Haas (1–0)	Wells (6–6)		Tiger Stadium	40,035	65–46	L3
112	August 10	Orioles	8–4	Stottlemyre (7–7)	Mussina (11–5)		SkyDome	50,395	66–46	W1
113	August 11	Orioles	0–3	Mills (8–2)	Morris (14–5)	Olson (27)	SkyDome	50,421	66–47	L1
114	August 12	Orioles	4–11	McDonald (12–7)	Key (7–10)		SkyDome	50,419	66–48	L2
115	August 13	Orioles	4–2	Linton (1–1)	Rhodes (4–2)	Henke (21)	SkyDome	50,405	67–48	W1
116	August 14	@ Indians	9–5	Wells (7–6)	Nichols (2–3)		Cleveland Stadium	41,686	68–48	W2
--	August 15	@ Indians	Postponed (rain) Rescheduled for August 16							
117	August 16	@ Indians	2–4	Cook (4–5)	Stottlemyre (7–8)	Olin (21)	Cleveland Stadium	n/a	68–49	L1
118	August 16	@ Indians	6–2	Morris (15–5)	Otto (5–9)		Cleveland Stadium	27,997	69–49	W1
119	August 18	@ Brewers	12–1	Key (8–10)	Ruffin (1–5)		County Stadium	31,297	70–49	W2
120	August 19	@ Brewers	5–10	Bosio (11–5)	Linton (1–2)		County Stadium	32,060	70–50	L1
121	August 20	@ Brewers	3–16	Wegman (11–10)	Wells (7–7)		County Stadium	34,702	70–51	L2
122	August 21	@ Twins	1–5	Smiley (13–6)	Stottlemyre (7–9)		Hubert H. Humphrey Metrodome	48,082	70–52	L3
123	August 22	@ Twins	4–2	Morris (16–5)	West (1–2)	Henke (22)	Hubert H. Humphrey Metrodome	50,465	71–52	W1
124	August 23	@ Twins	0–2	Erickson (9–10)	Key (8–11)		Hubert H. Humphrey Metrodome	45,211	71–53	L1
125	August 24	@ White Sox	4–8	Fernandez (6–7)	Linton (1–3)		Comiskey Park	32,837	71–54	L2
126	August 25	@ White Sox	3–6	Hough (6–10)	Wells (7–8)	Hernández (4)	Comiskey Park	29,450	71–55	L3
127	August 26	@ White Sox	9–0	Stottlemyre (8–9)	McCaskill (9–10)		Comiskey Park	26,436	72–55	W1
128	August 27	Brewers	5–4	Morris (17–5)	Navarro (14–9)	Henke (23)	SkyDome	50,415	73–55	W2
129	August 28	Brewers	2–22	Eldred (5–1)	Key (8–12)		SkyDome	50,408	73–56	L1
130	August 29	Brewers	2–7	Bosio (12–5)	Cone (0–1)	Holmes (3)	SkyDome	50,413	73–57	L2
131	August 30	Brewers	5–3	Ward (6–4)	Wegman (11–12)	Henke (24)	SkyDome	50,412	74–57	W1
132	August 31	White Sox	9–2	Stottlemyre (9–9)	Hough (6–11)		SkyDome	50,417	75–57	W2

September: 18–9 (Home: 9–5; Road: 9–4)

#	Date	Opponent	Score	Win	Loss	Save	Stadium	Attendance	Record	Report
133	September 1	White Sox	9–3	Morris (18–5)	McCaskill (9–11)		SkyDome	50,409	76–57	W3
134	September 2	White Sox	2–3	Hibbard (10–6)	Key (8–13)	Hernández (6)	SkyDome	50,419	76–58	L1
135	September 4	Twins	16–5	Cone (1–1)	Tapani (14–10)		SkyDome	50,420	77–58	W1
136	September 5	Twins	7–3	Guzmán (13–3)	Smiley (14–7)		SkyDome	50,409	78–58	W2
137	September 6	Twins	4–2	Stottlemyre (10–9)	Trombley (0–1)	Henke (25)	SkyDome	50,421	79–58	W3
138	September 7	@ Royals	4–5 (12)	Magnante (4–7)	Wells (7–9)		Royals Stadium	21,015	79–59	L1
139	September 8	@ Royals	5–0	Key (9–13)	Aquino (2–5)		Royals Stadium	15,454	80–59	W1
140	September 9	@ Royals	1–0	Cone (2–1)	Appier (15–8)	Henke (26)	Royals Stadium	15,454	81–59	W2
--	September 10	@ Rangers	Postponed (rain) Rescheduled for September 11							
141	September 11	@ Rangers	7–5	Guzmán (14–3)	Chiamparino (0–2)	Henke (27)	Arlington Stadium	n/a	82–59	W3
142	September 11	@ Rangers	3–4	Pavlik (4–2)	Stottlemyre (10–10)	Burns (1)	Arlington Stadium	19,396	82–60	L1
143	September 12	@ Rangers	4–2	Morris (19–5)	Smith (0–1)	Henke (28)	Arlington Stadium	27,178	83–60	W1
144	September 13	@ Rangers	7–2	Key (10–13)	Brown (19–9)	Ward (11)	Arlington Stadium	16,654	84–60	W2
145	September 14	Indians	1–2	Mesa (7–10)	Cone (2–2)	Olin (26)	SkyDome	50,394	84–61	L1
146	September 15	Indians	5–4	Guzmán (15–3)	Embree (0–1)	Henke (29)	SkyDome	49,487	85–61	W1
147	September 16	Indians	3–6	Nagy (15–10)	Stottlemyre (10–11)	Power (6)	SkyDome	50,416	85–62	L1
148	September 17	Indians	7–5 (10)	Ward (7–4)	Plunk (8–4)		SkyDome	50,408	86–62	W1
149	September 18	Rangers	13–0	Key (11–13)	Brown (19–10)		SkyDome	50,416	87–62	W2
150	September 19	Rangers	1–0	Cone (3–2)	Chiamparino (0–3)	Henke (30)	SkyDome	50,421	88–62	W3
151	September 20	Rangers	5–7	Guzmán (15–11)	Guzmán (15–4)	Whiteside (2)	SkyDome	50,405	88–63	L1
152	September 22	@ Orioles	4–3	Stottlemyre (11–11)	Sutcliffe (16–14)	Henke (31)	Oriole Park at Camden Yards	45,104	89–63	W1
153	September 23	@ Orioles	1–4	Rhodes (6–5)	Morris (19–6)	Olson (34)	Oriole Park at Camden Yards	45,660	89–64	L1
154	September 24	@ Orioles	8–2	Key (12–13)	McDonald (12–13)		Oriole Park at Camden Yards	45,739	90–64	W1
155	September 25	@ Yankees	3–1	Cone (4–2)	Pérez (12–16)	Henke (32)	Yankee Stadium	18,124	91–64	W2
156	September 26	@ Yankees	1–2	Wickman (5–1)	Guzmán (15–5)	Farr (28)	Yankee Stadium	23,438	91–65	L1
157	September 27	@ Yankees	12–2	Morris (20–6)	Sanderson (12–10)		Yankee Stadium	21,413	92–65	W1
158	September 29	Red Sox	5–2	Key (13–13)	Darwin (9–9)	Henke (33)	SkyDome	50,418	93–65	W2
159	September 30	Red Sox	0–1	Viola (13–12)	Cone (4–3)		SkyDome	50,420	93–66	L1

October: 3–0 (Home: 3–0; Road: 0–0)

#	Date	Opponent	Score	Win	Loss	Save	Stadium	Attendance	Record	Report
160	October 2	Tigers	8–7	Morris (21–6)	Gullickson (14–13)	Henke (34)	SkyDome	50,418	94–66	W1
161	October 3	Tigers	3–1	Guzmán (16–5)	Haas (5–3)	Ward (12)	SkyDome	50,412	95–66	W2
162	October 4	Tigers	7–4	Stottlemyre (12–11)	Aldred (3–8)	Timlin (1)	SkyDome	50,421	96–66	W3

== Player stats ==
= Indicates team leader

=== Batting ===
==== Starters by position ====
Note: Pos = Position; G = Games played; AB = At bats; H = Hits; Avg. = Batting average; HR = Home runs; RBI = Runs batted in

Pos	Player	G	AB	H	Avg.	HR	RBI
C	Pat Borders	138	480	116	.242	13	53
1B	John Olerud	138	458	130	.284	16	66
2B	Roberto Alomar	152	571	177	.310	8	76
3B	Kelly Gruber	120	446	102	.229	11	43
SS	Manuel Lee	128	396	104	.263	3	39
LF	Candy Maldonado	137	489	133	.272	20	66
CF	Devon White	153	641	159	.248	17	60
RF	Joe Carter	158	622	164	.264	34	119
DH	Dave Winfield	156	583	169	.290	26	108

==== Other batters ====
Note: G = Games played; AB = At bats; H = Hits; Avg. = Batting average; HR = Home runs; RBI = Runs batted in

Player	G	AB	H	Avg.	HR	RBI
Jeff Kent	65	192	46	.240	8	35
Derek Bell	61	161	39	.242	2	12
Alfredo Griffin	63	150	35	.233	0	10
Pat Tabler	49	135	34	.252	0	16
Greg Myers	22	61	14	.230	1	13
Ed Sprague Jr.	22	47	11	.234	1	7
Turner Ward	18	29	10	.345	1	3
Rob Ducey	23	21	1	.048	0	0
Randy Knorr	8	19	5	.263	1	2
Tom Quinlan	13	15	1	.067	0	2
Domingo Martinez	7	8	5	.625	1	3
Eddie Zosky	8	7	2	.286	0	1
Mike Maksudian	3	3	0	.000	0	0
Rance Mulliniks	3	2	1	.500	0	0

=== Pitching ===
= Indicates league leader

==== Starting pitchers ====
Note: G = Games pitched; IP = Innings pitched; W = Wins; L = Losses; ERA = Earned run average; SO = Strikeouts

Player	G	IP	W	L	ERA	SO
Jack Morris	34	240.2	21	6	4.04	132
Jimmy Key	33	216.2	13	13	3.53	117
Juan Guzmán	28	180.2	16	5	2.64	165
Todd Stottlemyre	28	174.0	12	11	4.50	98
Dave Stieb	21	96.1	4	6	5.04	45
David Cone	8	53.0	4	3	2.55	47

==== Other pitchers ====
Note: G = Games pitched; IP = Innings pitched; W = Wins; L = Losses; ERA = Earned run average; SO = Strikeouts

Player	G	IP	W	L	ERA	SO
David Wells	41	120.0	7	9	5.40	62
Doug Linton	8	24.0	1	3	8.63	16

==== Relief pitchers ====
Note: G = Games pitched; W = Wins; L = Losses; SV = Saves; ERA = Earned run average; SO = Strikeouts

Player	G	W	L	SV	ERA	SO
Tom Henke	57	3	2	34	2.26	46
Duane Ward	79	7	4	12	1.95	103
Pat Hentgen	28	5	2	0	5.36	39
Bob MacDonald	27	1	0	0	4.37	26
Mike Timlin	26	0	2	1	4.12	35
Mark Eichhorn	23	2	0	0	4.35	19
David Weathers	2	0	0	0	8.10	3
Ricky Trlicek	2	0	0	0	10.80	1
Al Leiter	1	0	0	0	9.00	0

== Postseason ==
=== American League Championship Series ===
The Toronto Blue Jays entered the series with a three-man pitching rotation of Jack Morris, David Cone, and Juan Guzmán.

==== Game 1 ====
October 7, Skydome

Team	1	2	3	4	5	6	7	8	9	R	H	E
Oakland	0	3	0	0	0	0	0	0	1	4	6	1
Toronto	0	0	0	0	1	1	0	1	0	3	9	0
W: Jeff Russell (1–0) L: Jack Morris (0–1) S: Dennis Eckersley (1)
HR: OAK – Mark McGwire (1) Terry Steinbach (1) Harold Baines (1) TOR – Pat Borders (1) Dave Winfield (1)

==== Game 2 ====
October 8, Skydome

Team	1	2	3	4	5	6	7	8	9	R	H	E
Oakland	0	0	0	0	0	0	0	0	1	1	6	0
Toronto	0	0	0	0	2	0	1	0	X	3	4	0
W: David Cone (1–0) L: Mike Moore (0–1) S: Tom Henke (1)
HR: TOR – Kelly Gruber (1)

==== Game 3 ====
October 10, Oakland–Alameda County Coliseum

Team	1	2	3	4	5	6	7	8	9	R	H	E
Toronto	0	1	0	1	1	0	2	1	1	7	9	1
Oakland	0	0	0	2	0	0	2	1	0	5	13	3
W: Juan Guzmán (1–0) L: Ron Darling (0–1) S: Tom Henke (2)
HR: TOR – Roberto Alomar (1) Candy Maldonado (1)

==== Game 4 ====
October 11, Oakland–Alameda County Coliseum

The defining moment of the Series came in the ninth inning of Game 4, when Toronto second baseman Roberto Alomar hit a game-tying 2-run home run off Athletics closer Dennis Eckersley. The Blue Jays would eventually win the game 7–6 in 11 innings and take a 3–1 series lead.

Team	1	2	3	4	5	6	7	8	9	10	11	R	H	E
Toronto	0	1	0	0	0	0	0	3	2	0	1	7	17	4
Oakland	0	0	5	0	0	1	0	0	0	0	0	6	12	2
W: Duane Ward (1–0) L: Kelly Downs (0–1) S: Tom Henke (3)
HR: TOR – John Olerud (1) Roberto Alomar (2)

==== Game 5 ====
October 12, Oakland–Alameda County Coliseum

Team	1	2	3	4	5	6	7	8	9	R	H	E
Toronto	0	0	0	1	0	0	1	0	0	2	7	3
Oakland	2	0	1	0	3	0	0	0	X	6	8	0
W: Dave Stewart (1–0) L: David Cone (1-1)
HR: OAK – Rubén Sierra (1) TOR – Dave Winfield (2)

==== Game 6 ====
October 14, Skydome

With their victory in game 6, the 1992 Blue Jays became the first non-American-based team to go to the World Series.

Team	1	2	3	4	5	6	7	8	9	R	H	E
Oakland	0	0	0	0	0	1	0	1	0	2	7	1
Toronto	2	0	4	0	1	0	0	2	X	9	13	0
W: Juan Guzmán (2–0) L: Mike Moore (0–2)
HR: TOR – Joe Carter (1) Candy Maldonado (2)

=== World Series ===
==== Game 1 ====
October 17, 1992, at Atlanta–Fulton County Stadium in Atlanta

Team	1	2	3	4	5	6	7	8	9	R	H	E
Toronto	0	0	0	1	0	0	0	0	0	1	4	0
Atlanta	0	0	0	0	0	3	0	0	X	3	4	0
W: Tom Glavine (1–0) L: Jack Morris (0–1)
HR: TOR – Joe Carter (1) ATL – Damon Berryhill (1)

==== Game 2 ====
October 18, 1992, at Atlanta–Fulton County Stadium in Atlanta

Team	1	2	3	4	5	6	7	8	9	R	H	E
Toronto	0	0	0	0	2	0	0	1	2	5	9	2
Atlanta	0	1	0	1	2	0	0	0	0	4	5	1
W: Duane Ward (1–0) L: Jeff Reardon (0–1) S: Tom Henke (1)
HR: TOR – Ed Sprague (1)

==== Game 3 ====
October 20, 1992, at SkyDome in Toronto

Team	1	2	3	4	5	6	7	8	9	R	H	E
Atlanta	0	0	0	0	0	1	0	1	0	2	9	0
Toronto	0	0	0	1	0	0	0	1	1	3	6	1
W: Duane Ward (2–0) L: Steve Avery (0–1)
HR: TOR – Joe Carter (2), Kelly Gruber (1)

==== Game 4 ====
October 21, 1992, at SkyDome in Toronto

Team	1	2	3	4	5	6	7	8	9	R	H	E
Atlanta	0	0	0	0	0	0	0	1	0	1	5	0
Toronto	0	0	1	0	0	0	1	0	0	2	6	0
W: Jimmy Key (1–0) L: Tom Glavine (1-1) S: Tom Henke (2)
HR: TOR – Pat Borders (1)

==== Game 5 ====
October 22, 1992, at SkyDome in Toronto

Team	1	2	3	4	5	6	7	8	9	R	H	E
Atlanta	1	0	0	1	5	0	0	0	0	7	13	0
Toronto	0	1	0	1	0	0	0	0	0	2	6	0
W: John Smoltz (1–0) L: Jack Morris (0–2) S: Mike Stanton (1)
HR: ATL – David Justice (1), Lonnie Smith (1)

==== Game 6 ====
October 24, 1992, at Atlanta–Fulton County Stadium in Atlanta

Team	1	2	3	4	5	6	7	8	9	10	11	R	H	E
Toronto	1	0	0	1	0	0	0	0	0	0	2	4	14	1
Atlanta	0	0	1	0	0	0	0	0	1	0	1	3	8	1
W: Jimmy Key (2–0) L: Charlie Leibrandt (0–1) S: Mike Timlin (1)
HR: TOR – Candy Maldonado (1)

=== Postseason Game Log ===
Legend
Blue Jays win	Blue Jays loss	Game postponed

1992 Playoff Game Log
American League Championship Series: 4–2

#	Date	Opponent	Score	Win	Loss	Save	Stadium	Attendance	Series	Report
1	October 7	Athletics	3–4	Russell (1–0)	Morris (0–1)	Eckersley (1)	SkyDome	51,039	0–1	L1
2	October 8	Athletics	3–1	Cone (1–0)	Moore (0–1)	Henke (1)	SkyDome	51,114	1–1	W1
3	October 10	@ Athletics	7–5	Guzman (1–0)	Darling (0–1)	Henke (2)	Oakland–Alameda County Coliseum	46,911	2–1	W2
4	October 11	@ Athletics	7–6 (11)	Ward (1–0)	Downs (0–1)	Henke (3)	Oakland–Alameda County Coliseum	47,732	3–1	W3
5	October 12	@ Athletics	2–6	Stewart (1–0)	Cone (1–1)		Oakland–Alameda County Coliseum	44,955	3–2	L1
6	October 14	Athletics	9–2	Guzman (2–0)	Moore (0–2)		SkyDome	51,335	4–2	W1

World Series: 4–2

#	Date	Opponent	Score	Win	Loss	Save	Stadium	Attendance	Series	Report
1	October 17	@ Braves	1–3	Glavine (1–0)	Morris (0–1)		Atlanta–Fulton County Stadium	51,763	0–1	L1
2	October 18	@ Braves	5–4	Ward (1–0)	Reardon (0–1)	Henke (1)	Atlanta–Fulton County Stadium	51,763	1–1	W1
3	October 20	Braves	3–2	Ward (2–0)	Avery (0–1)		SkyDome	51,813	2–1	W2
4	October 21	Braves	2–1	Key (1–0)	Glavine (1–1)	Henke (2)	SkyDome	52,090	3–1	W3
5	October 22	Braves	2–7	Smoltz (1–0)	Morris (0–2)	Stanton (1)	SkyDome	52,268	3–2	L1
6	October 24	@ Braves	4–3 (11)	Key (2–0)	Leibrandt (0–1)	Timlin (1)	Atlanta–Fulton County Stadium	51,763	4–2	W1

== Award winners ==
=== Awards ===
Regular Season
Player	Award	Awarded
Roberto Alomar	AL Player of the Week	April 20–26, 1992
Roberto Alomar	Player of the Month Award	April 1992
Roberto Alomar	Silver Slugger Award	November 1992
Roberto Alomar	Gold Glove Award	November 1992
Joe Carter	AL Player of the Week	June 8–14, 1992
Joe Carter	AL Player of the Week	August 10–16, 1992
Devon White	Gold Glove Award	November 1992
Dave Winfield	Silver Slugger Award	November 1992
Dave Winfield	Babe Ruth Award	November 1992

Playoffs
Player	Award	Awarded
Roberto Alomar	ALCS MVP	October 1992
Pat Borders	World Series MVP	October 1992

The 1992 Toronto Blue Jays were inducted into the Ontario Sports Hall of Fame in 2001.

== 63rd MLB All-Star Game ==
Infielders

Pos	#	Player	League	AB	H	RBI
2B	12	Roberto Alomar	American League; Starter	3	1	0

Outfielders

Pos	#	Player	League	AB	H	RBI
RF	29	Joe Carter	American League; Starter	3	2	1

Pitchers

#	Player	League	IP	SO
66	Juan Guzmán	American League	1	2

== Farm system ==
Level	Team	League	Manager
AAA	Syracuse Chiefs	International League	Nick Leyva
AA	Knoxville Blue Jays	Southern League	Garth Iorg
A	Dunedin Blue Jays	Florida State League	Dennis Holmberg
A	Myrtle Beach Hurricanes	South Atlantic League	Doug Ault
A-Short Season	St. Catharines Blue Jays	New York–Penn League	J. J. Cannon
Rookie	GCL Blue Jays	Gulf Coast League	Omar Malavé
Rookie	Medicine Hat Blue Jays	Pioneer League	Jim Nettles

LEAGUE CHAMPIONS: Myrtle Beach
