= 1993 New York Yankees season =

Season for the Major League Baseball team the New York Yankees

1993 New York Yankees
- League: American League
- Division: East
- Ballpark: Yankee Stadium
- City: New York City
- Record: 88–74 (.543)
- Divisional place: 2nd
- Owners: George Steinbrenner
- General managers: Gene Michael
- Managers: Buck Showalter
- Television: WPIX (Phil Rizzuto, Tom Seaver, Bobby Murcer); MSG (Dewayne Staats, Tony Kubek, Al Trautwig)
- Radio: WABC (AM) (John Sterling, Michael Kay)

The 1993 New York Yankees season was the 91st season for the Yankees. The team finished with a record of 88–74 finishing 7 games behind the Toronto Blue Jays for their first winning season since 1988, but they still missed the playoffs for the 12th consecutive season — in what was the longest active streak of missing the playoffs in franchise history.

New York was managed by Buck Showalter. The Yankees played at Yankee Stadium. This would be the last time the Yankees would miss the playoffs until 2008.

== Offseason ==
- November 3, 1992: Roberto Kelly was traded by the Yankees to the Cincinnati Reds for Paul O'Neill and Joe DeBerry (minors).
- November 6, 1992: Greg Cadaret was purchased from the Yankees by the Cincinnati Reds.
- November 17, 1992: Charlie Hayes was drafted from the Yankees by the Colorado Rockies with the 3rd pick in the 1992 MLB expansion draft.
- December 4, 1992: Spike Owen was signed as a free agent by the Yankees.
- December 6, 1992: J. T. Snow, Jerry Nielsen, and Russ Springer were traded by the Yankees to the California Angels for Jim Abbott.
- December 7, 1992: Sherman Obando was drafted from the Yankees by the Baltimore Orioles rule 5 draft.
- December 10, 1992: Jimmy Key was signed as a free agent by the Yankees.
- December 15, 1992: Wade Boggs was signed as a free agent by the Yankees.

== Regular season ==
Reggie Jackson's number 44 was retired by the New York Yankees in 1993.

=== Season standings ===
AL East
Team	W	L	Pct.	GB	Home	Road
Toronto Blue Jays	95	67	.586	—	48‍–‍33	47‍–‍34
New York Yankees	88	74	.543	7	50‍–‍31	38‍–‍43
Baltimore Orioles	85	77	.525	10	48‍–‍33	37‍–‍44
Detroit Tigers	85	77	.525	10	44‍–‍37	41‍–‍40
Boston Red Sox	80	82	.494	15	43‍–‍38	37‍–‍44
Cleveland Indians	76	86	.469	19	46‍–‍35	30‍–‍51
Milwaukee Brewers	69	93	.426	26	38‍–‍43	31‍–‍50

=== Record vs. opponents ===
1993 American League record Source: MLB Standings Grid – 1993
Team	BAL	BOS	CAL	CWS	CLE	DET	KC	MIL	MIN	NYY	OAK	SEA	TEX	TOR
Baltimore	—	6–7	7–5	4–8	8–5	5–8	7–5	8–5	8–4	6–7	10–2	7–5	4–8	5–8
Boston	7–6	—	7–5	7–5	5–8	6–7	5–7	5–8	7–5	6–7	9–3	7–5	6–6	3–10
California	5–7	5–7	—	7–6	5–7	4–8	6–7	7–5	4–9	6–6	6–7	6–7	6–7	4–8
Chicago	8–4	5–7	6–7	—	9–3	7–5	6–7	9–3	10–3	4–8	7–6	9–4	8–5	6–6
Cleveland	5–8	8–5	7–5	3–9	—	6–7	7–5	8–5	4–8	6–7	8–4	3–9	7–5	4–9
Detroit	8–5	7–6	8–4	5–7	7–6	—	5–7	8–5	6–6	4–9	8–4	7–5	6–6	6–7
Kansas City	5–7	7–5	7–6	7–6	5–7	7–5	—	5–7	7–6	6–6	6–7	7–6	7–6	8–4
Milwaukee	5–8	8–5	5–7	3–9	5–8	5–8	7–5	—	7–5	4–9	7–5	4–8	4–8	5–8
Minnesota	4–8	5–7	9–4	3–10	8–4	6–6	6–7	5–7	—	4–8	8–5	4–9	7–6	2–10
New York	7–6	7–6	6–6	8–4	7–6	9–4	6–6	9–4	8–4	—	6–6	7–5	3–9	5–8
Oakland	2–10	3–9	7–6	6–7	4–8	4–8	7–6	5–7	5–8	6–6	—	9–4	5–8	5–7
Seattle	5–7	5–7	7–6	4–9	9–3	5–7	6–7	8–4	9–4	5–7	4–9	—	8–5	7–5
Texas	8–4	6–6	7–6	5–8	5–7	6–6	6–7	8–4	6–7	9–3	8–5	5–8	—	7–5
Toronto	8–5	10–3	8–4	6–6	9–4	7–6	4–8	8–5	10–2	8–5	7–5	5–7	5–7	—

=== Notable Transactions ===
- July 30, 1993: John Habyan was traded by the Yankees to the Kansas City Royals as part of a 3-team trade. The Chicago Cubs sent Paul Assenmacher to the Yankees. The Royals sent Tuffy Rhodes to the Cubs.
- August 31, 1993: Rich Batchelor was traded by the Yankees to the St. Louis Cardinals for Lee Smith.

=== Roster ===
1993 New York Yankees
Roster
Pitchers: 25 Jim Abbott; 43 Paul Assenmacher; 34 Andy Cook; 26 Steve Farr; 35 Paul Gibson; 42 John Habyan; 53 Neal Heaton; 34 Sterling Hitchcock; 57 Steve Howe; 53 Mark Hutton; 42 Domingo Jean; 43 Jeff Johnson; 28 Scott Kamieniecki; 22 Jimmy Key; 34 Sam Militello; 55 Rich Monteleone; 54 Bobby Muñoz; 33 Mélido Pérez; 47 Lee Smith; 31 Frank Tanana; 27 Bob Wickman; 39 Mike Witt	Catchers: 38 Matt Nokes; 20 Mike Stanley; Infielders: 12 Wade Boggs; 2 Mike Gallego; 14 Pat Kelly; 13 Jim Leyritz; 24 Kevin Maas; 23 Don Mattingly; 17 Spike Owen; 47 Dave Silvestri; 35 Andy Stankiewicz	Outfielders: 29 Mike Humphreys; 19 Dion James; 31 Hensley Meulens; 21 Paul O'Neill; 45 Danny Tartabull; 18 Randy Velarde; 51 Bernie Williams; 36 Gerald Williams	Manager: 11 Buck Showalter; Coaches: 6 Clete Boyer; 40 Tony Cloninger; 52 Mark Connor; 48 Rick Down; 46 Frank Howard; 50 Ed Napoleon

== Player stats ==
= Indicates team leader

=== Batting ===
==== Starters by position ====
Note: Pos = Position; G = Games played; AB = At bats; H = Hits; Avg. = Batting average; HR = Home runs; RBI = Runs batted in

Pos	Player	G	AB	H	Avg.	HR	RBI
C	Mike Stanley	130	423	129	.305	26	84
1B	Don Mattingly	134	530	154	.291	17	86
2B	Pat Kelly	106	318	72	.226	7	27
3B	Wade Boggs	143	560	169	.302	2	59
SS	Spike Owen	103	334	78	.234	2	20
LF	Dion James	115	343	114	.332	7	36
CF	Bernie Williams	139	567	152	.268	12	68
RF	Paul O'Neill	141	498	155	.311	20	75
DH	Danny Tartabull	138	513	128	.250	31	102

==== Other batters ====
Note: G = Games played; AB = At bats; H = Hits; Avg. = Batting average; HR = Home runs; RBI = Runs batted in

Player	G	AB	H	Avg.	HR	RBI
Mike Gallego	119	403	114	.283	10	54
Jim Leyritz	95	259	80	.309	14	53
Randy Velarde	85	226	68	.301	7	24
Matt Nokes	76	217	54	.249	10	35
Kevin Maas	59	151	31	.205	9	25
Gerald Williams	42	67	10	.149	0	6
Hensley Meulens	30	53	9	.170	2	5
Mike Humphreys	25	35	6	.171	1	6
Dave Silvestri	7	21	6	.286	1	4
Andy Stankiewicz	16	9	0	.000	0	0

=== Pitching ===
==== Starting pitchers ====
Note: G = Games pitched; IP = Innings pitched; W = Wins; L = Losses; ERA = Earned run average; SO = Strikeouts

Player	G	IP	W	L	ERA	SO
Jimmy Key	34	236.2	18	6	3.00	173
Jim Abbott	32	214.0	11	14	4.37	95
Mélido Pérez	25	163.0	6	14	5.19	148
Scott Kamieniecki	30	154.1	10	7	4.08	72
Mike Witt	9	41.0	3	2	5.27	30
Sterling Hitchcock	6	31.0	1	2	4.65	26
Frank Tanana	3	19.2	0	2	3.20	12
Jeff Johnson	2	2.2	0	2	30.38	0

==== Other pitchers ====
Note: G = Games pitched; IP = Innings pitched; W = Wins; L = Losses; ERA = Earned run average; SO = Strikeouts

Player	G	IP	W	L	ERA	SO
Bob Wickman	41	140.0	14	4	4.63	70
Domingo Jean	10	40.1	1	1	4.46	20
Mark Hutton	7	22.0	1	1	5.73	12
Sam Militello	3	9.1	1	1	6.75	5

==== Relief pitchers ====
Note: G = Games pitched; W = Wins; L = Losses; SV = Saves; ERA = Earned run average; SO = Strikeouts

Player	G	W	L	SV	ERA	SO
Steve Farr	49	2	2	25	4.21	39
Steve Howe	51	3	5	4	4.97	19
Rich Monteleone	42	7	4	0	4.94	50
Bobby Muñoz	38	3	3	0	5.32	33
John Habyan	36	2	1	1	4.04	29
Paul Assenmacher	26	2	2	0	3.12	11
Paul Gibson	20	2	0	0	3.06	25
Neal Heaton	18	1	0	0	6.00	15
Lee Smith	8	0	0	3	0.00	11
Andy Cook	4	0	1	0	5.06	4

== Awards and honors ==
- Don Mattingly, first base, Lou Gehrig Memorial Award
- Reggie Jackson's number retired.

1993 MLB All-Star Game

- Wade Boggs, third base, starter
- Jimmy Key, reserve pitcher

== Farm system ==
Level	Team	League	Manager
AAA	Columbus Clippers	International League	Stump Merrill
AA	Albany-Colonie Yankees	Eastern League	Mike Hart and Bill Evers
A	Prince William Cannons	Carolina League	Trey Hillman
A	Greensboro Hornets	South Atlantic League	Bill Evers and Gary Denbo
A-Short Season	Oneonta Yankees	New York–Penn League	Mark Newman
Rookie	GCL Yankees	Gulf Coast League	Glenn Sherlock
