= 1992 New York Yankees season =

Season for the Major League Baseball team the New York Yankees

1992 New York Yankees
- League: American League
- Division: East
- Ballpark: Yankee Stadium
- City: New York City
- Record: 76–86 (.469)
- Divisional place: 4th
- Owners: George Steinbrenner and Joe Molloy (managing partner)
- General managers: Gene Michael
- Managers: Buck Showalter
- Television: WPIX (Phil Rizzuto, Tom Seaver, Bobby Murcer) MSG (Dewayne Staats, Tony Kubek, Al Trautwig)
- Radio: WABC (AM) (John Sterling, Michael Kay)

The 1992 New York Yankees season was the 90th season for the Yankees, their 69th at Yankee Stadium and their first under manager Buck Showalter. The team looked to improve their standings from 1991 when they finished fifth in the American League East with a 71–91 record.

The Yankees did improve their record by five games and finished tied for fourth place with the Cleveland Indians at 76–86, 20 games behind their division rival and eventual World Series champion Toronto Blue Jays. Nevertheless, the team finished with a losing record for the fourth consecutive year, with 86 being their fewest losses in that span.

As of the conclusion of the 2026 season, this is the last time that the Yankees have finished with a losing record, as they have currently gone 34 consecutive seasons with a winning record from 1993 to 2026 — the longest active streak in North American professional sports.

== Offseason ==
- November 13, 1991: Ramiro Mendoza was signed as an amateur free agent by the Yankees.
- November 20, 1991: Eric Plunk was released by the New York Yankees.
- December 2, 1991: Bob Geren was selected off waivers from the Yankees by the Cincinnati Reds.
- January 6, 1992: Danny Tartabull was signed as a free agent with the Yankees.
- January 8, 1992: Darrin Chapin was traded by the Yankees to the Philadelphia Phillies for a player to be named later. The Phillies completed the deal by sending Charlie Hayes to the Yankees on February 19.
- January 9, 1992: Mike Gallego signed as a free agent with the Yankees.
- January 10, 1992: Steve Sax was traded by the Yankees to the Chicago White Sox for Bob Wickman, Domingo Jean and Mélido Pérez.

== Regular season ==
- On August 12, pitcher Scott Sanderson threw exactly three pitches and recorded three outs. This was accomplished in the fifth inning.
- J. T. Snow made his major league debut on September 20 against the Kansas City Royals. In five at bats he had no hits.

=== Season standings ===
AL East
Team	W	L	Pct.	GB	Home	Road
Toronto Blue Jays	96	66	.593	—	53‍–‍28	43‍–‍38
Milwaukee Brewers	92	70	.568	4	53‍–‍28	39‍–‍42
Baltimore Orioles	89	73	.549	7	43‍–‍38	46‍–‍35
Cleveland Indians	76	86	.469	20	41‍–‍40	35‍–‍46
New York Yankees	76	86	.469	20	41‍–‍40	35‍–‍46
Detroit Tigers	75	87	.463	21	38‍–‍42	37‍–‍45
Boston Red Sox	73	89	.451	23	44‍–‍37	29‍–‍52

=== Record vs. opponents ===
1992 American League record Sources:
Team	BAL	BOS	CAL	CWS	CLE	DET	KC	MIL	MIN	NYY	OAK	SEA	TEX	TOR
Baltimore	—	8–5	8–4	6–6	7–6	10–3	8–4	6–7	6–6	5–8	6–6	7–5	7–5	5–8
Boston	5–8	—	8–4	6–6	6–7	4–9	7–5	5–8	3–9	7–6	5–7	6–6	4–8	7–6
California	4–8	4–8	—	3–10	6–6	7–5	8–5	5–7	2–11	7–5	5–8	7–6	9–4	5–7
Chicago	6–6	6–6	10–3	—	7–5	10–2	7–6	5–7	8–5	8–4	5–8	4–9	5–8	5–7
Cleveland	6–7	7–6	6–6	5–7	—	5–8	5–7	5–8	6–6	7–6	6–6	7–5	5–7	6–7
Detroit	3–10	9–4	5–7	2–10	8–5	—	7–5	5–8	3–9	5–8	6–6	9–3	8–4	5–8
Kansas City	4–8	5–7	5–8	6–7	7–5	5–7	—	7–5	6–7	5–7	4–9	7–6	6–7	5–7
Milwaukee	7–6	8–5	7–5	7–5	8–5	8–5	5–7	—	6–6	6–7	7–5	8–4	7–5	8–5
Minnesota	6–6	9–3	11–2	5–8	6–6	9–3	7–6	6–6	—	7–5	5–8	8–5	6–7	5–7
New York	8–5	6–7	5–7	4–8	6–7	8–5	7–5	7–6	5–7	—	6–6	6–6	6–6	2–11
Oakland	6–6	7–5	8–5	8–5	6–6	6–6	9–4	5–7	8–5	6–6	—	12–1	9–4	6–6
Seattle	5–7	6–6	6–7	9–4	5–7	3–9	6–7	4–8	5–8	6–6	1–12	—	4–9	4–8
Texas	5–7	8–4	4–9	8–5	7–5	4–8	7–6	5–7	7–6	6–6	4–9	9–4	—	3–9
Toronto	8–5	6–7	7–5	7–5	7–6	8–5	7–5	5–8	7–5	11–2	6–6	8–4	9–3	—

=== Notable transactions ===
- April 9, 1992: Shawn Hillegas was signed as a free agent by the Yankees.
- June 1, 1992: Derek Jeter was drafted by the New York Yankees in the 1st round (6th pick) of the 1992 amateur draft. Player signed June 27, 1992.
- August 22, 1992: Tim Leary and cash were traded by the Yankees to the Seattle Mariners for Sean Twitty (minors).
- August 22, 1992: Shawn Hillegas was released by the New York Yankees.

=== Roster ===
1992 New York Yankees
Roster
Pitchers: 41 Tim Burke; 25 Greg Cadaret; 26 Steve Farr; 35 Lee Guetterman; 42 John Habyan; 36 Shawn Hillegas; 54 Sterling Hitchcock; 57 Steve Howe; 49,43 Jeff Johnson; 22 Scott Kamieniecki; 54 Tim Leary; 43 Sam Militello; 55 Rich Monteleone; 34 Jerry Nielsen; 33 Mélido Pérez; 21 Scott Sanderson; 36 Russ Springer; 31 Bob Wickman; 35 Curt Young	Catchers: 12 Jim Leyritz; 38 Matt Nokes; 20 Mike Stanley; Infielders: 2 Mike Gallego; 28 Charlie Hayes; 14 Pat Kelly; 24 Kevin Maas; 23 Don Mattingly; 59 Hensley Meulens; 56 Dave Silvestri; 60 J. T. Snow; 17 Andy Stankiewicz; 18 Randy Velarde	Outfielders: 29 Jesse Barfield; 27 Mel Hall; 31 Mike Humphreys; 19 Dion James; 39 Roberto Kelly; 45 Danny Tartabull; 51 Bernie Williams; 13 Gerald Williams	Manager: 11 Buck Showalter; Coaches: 47 Clete Boyer; 40 Tony Cloninger; 52 Mark Connor; 46 Frank Howard; 48 Monk Meyer; 50 Ed Napoleon; 53 Glenn Sherlock (bullpen catcher)

== Player stats ==
=== Batting ===
==== Starters by position ====
Note: Pos = Position; G = Games played; AB = At bats; H = Hits; Avg. = Batting average; HR = Home runs; RBI = Runs batted in

Pos.	Player	G	AB	H	Avg.	HR	RBI
C	Matt Nokes	121	384	86	.224	22	59
1B	Don Mattingly	157	640	184	.288	14	86
2B	Pat Kelly	106	318	72	.226	7	27
3B	Charlie Hayes	142	509	131	.257	18	66
SS	Andy Stankiewicz	116	400	107	.268	2	25
LF	Mel Hall	152	583	163	.280	15	81
CF	Roberto Kelly	152	580	158	.272	10	66
RF	Danny Tartabull	123	421	112	.266	25	85
DH	Kevin Maas	98	286	71	.248	11	35

==== Other batters ====
Note: G = Games played; AB = At bats; H = Hits; Avg. = Batting average; HR = Home runs; RBI = Runs batted in

Player	G	AB	H	Avg.	HR	RBI
Randy Velarde	121	412	112	.272	7	46
Bernie Williams	62	261	73	.280	5	26
Mike Stanley	68	173	43	.249	8	27
Mike Gallego	53	173	44	.254	3	14
Dion James	67	145	38	.262	3	17
Jim Leyritz	63	144	37	.257	7	26
Jesse Barfield	30	95	13	.137	2	7
Gerald Williams	15	27	8	.296	3	6
J.T. Snow	7	14	2	.143	0	2
Dave Silvestri	7	13	4	.308	0	1
Mike Humphreys	4	10	1	.100	0	0
Hensley Meulens	2	5	3	.600	1	1

=== Pitching ===
==== Starting pitchers ====
Note: G = Games pitched; IP = Innings pitched; W = Wins; L = Losses; ERA = Earned run average; SO = Strikeouts; BB = Walks allowed

Player	G	IP	W	L	ERA	SO	BB
Mélido Pérez	33	247.2	13	16	2.87	218	93
Scott Sanderson	33	193.1	12	11	4.93	104	64
Scott Kamieniecki	28	188.0	6	14	4.36	88	74
Tim Leary	18	97.0	5	6	5.57	34	57
Sam Militello	9	60.0	3	3	3.45	42	32
Bob Wickman	8	50.1	6	1	4.11	21	20
Sterling Hitchcock	3	13.0	0	2	8.31	6	6

==== Other pitchers ====
Note: G = Games pitched; IP = Innings pitched; W = Wins; L = Losses; ERA = Earned run average; SO = Strikeouts; BB = Walks allowed

Player	G	IP	W	L	ERA	SO	BB
Greg Cadaret	46	103.2	4	8	4.25	73	74
Shawn Hillegas	21	78.1	1	8	5.51	46	33
Jeff Johnson	13	52.2	2	3	6.66	14	23
Curt Young	13	43.1	3	0	3.32	13	10

===== Relief pitchers =====
Note: G = Games pitched; IP = Innings pitched; W = Wins; L = Losses; SV = Saves; ERA = Earned run average; SO = Strikeouts; BB = Walks allowed

Player	G	IP	W	L	SV	ERA	SO	BB
Steve Farr	50	52.0	2	2	30	1.56	37	19
John Habyan	56	72.2	5	6	7	3.84	44	21
Rich Monteleone	47	92.2	7	3	0	3.30	62	27
Tim Burke	23	27.2	2	2	0	3.25	8	15
Steve Howe	20	22.0	3	0	6	2.45	12	3
Jerry Nielsen	20	19.2	1	0	0	4.58	12	18
Lee Guetterman	15	22.2	1	1	0	9.53	5	13
Russ Springer	14	16.0	0	0	0	6.19	12	10

== Awards and records ==
1992 MLB All-Star Game

- Roberto Kelly, outfield, reserve

== Farm system ==
Level	Team	League	Manager
AAA	Columbus Clippers	International League	Rick Down
AA	Albany-Colonie Yankees	Eastern League	Dan Radison
A	Prince William Cannons	Carolina League	Mike Hart
A	Fort Lauderdale Yankees	Florida State League	Brian Butterfield
A	Greensboro Hornets	South Atlantic League	Trey Hillman
A-Short Season	Oneonta Yankees	New York–Penn League	Jack Gillis
Rookie	GCL Yankees	Gulf Coast League	Gary Denbo

LEAGUE CHAMPIONS: Columbus
