= 1992 Seattle Mariners season =

1992 Seattle Mariners
- League: American League
- Division: West
- Ballpark: Kingdome
- City: Seattle, Washington
- Record: 64–98 (.395)
- Divisional place: 7th
- Owners: Jeff Smulyan, purchased by Hiroshi Yamauchi in July
- General manager: Woody Woodward
- Manager: Bill Plummer
- Television: KSTW-TV 11
- Radio: KIRO 710 AM (Dave Niehaus, Ken Levine, Billy Sample)

The 1992 Seattle Mariners season was their 16th since the franchise creation. The team finished seventh (last) in the American League (AL) West with a record of 64–98 (.395).

After a then franchise-best 83 wins the previous season, the Mariners won 19 fewer games, the largest one-year decline in team history. Owner Jeff Smulyan sold the team in July to Nintendo president Hiroshi Yamauchi. First-year manager Bill Plummer was fired after the season, succeeded by Lou Piniella in November.

Starting pitcher Randy Johnson won the first of four consecutive AL strikeout titles with 241. In his third full season in the majors, 29-year-old third baseman Edgar Martínez batted .343 to lead the majors and win the first of his two AL batting titles. He hit .388 in July and .395 in August and was the AL Player of the Month for both.

== Offseason ==
- October 11, 1991: The Mariners decided not to retain manager Jim Lefebvre and pitching coach Mike Paul.
- October 29: Third base coach Bill Plummer was promoted to manager.
- December 11: Pitchers Bill Swift, Mike Jackson, and Dave Burba were traded to the San Francisco Giants for outfielder Kevin Mitchell and pitcher Mike Remlinger.
- January 27: Mark Grant signed as a minor league free agent with the Mariners.
- February 19, 1992: Shane Turner signed as a free agent with the Mariners.
- March 9: John Moses signed as a free agent with the Mariners.

== Regular season ==
=== Season standings ===
AL West
| Team | W | L | Pct. | GB | Home | Road |
|---|---|---|---|---|---|---|
| Oakland Athletics | 96 | 66 | .593 | — | 51‍–‍30 | 45‍–‍36 |
| Minnesota Twins | 90 | 72 | .556 | 6 | 48‍–‍33 | 42‍–‍39 |
| Chicago White Sox | 86 | 76 | .531 | 10 | 50‍–‍32 | 36‍–‍44 |
| Texas Rangers | 77 | 85 | .475 | 19 | 36‍–‍45 | 41‍–‍40 |
| California Angels | 72 | 90 | .444 | 24 | 41‍–‍40 | 31‍–‍50 |
| Kansas City Royals | 72 | 90 | .444 | 24 | 44‍–‍37 | 28‍–‍53 |
| Seattle Mariners | 64 | 98 | .395 | 32 | 38‍–‍43 | 26‍–‍55 |

=== Record vs. opponents ===
1992 American League record Sources:
| Team | BAL | BOS | CAL | CWS | CLE | DET | KC | MIL | MIN | NYY | OAK | SEA | TEX | TOR |
|---|---|---|---|---|---|---|---|---|---|---|---|---|---|---|
| Baltimore | — | 8–5 | 8–4 | 6–6 | 7–6 | 10–3 | 8–4 | 6–7 | 6–6 | 5–8 | 6–6 | 7–5 | 7–5 | 5–8 |
| Boston | 5–8 | — | 8–4 | 6–6 | 6–7 | 4–9 | 7–5 | 5–8 | 3–9 | 7–6 | 5–7 | 6–6 | 4–8 | 7–6 |
| California | 4–8 | 4–8 | — | 3–10 | 6–6 | 7–5 | 8–5 | 5–7 | 2–11 | 7–5 | 5–8 | 7–6 | 9–4 | 5–7 |
| Chicago | 6–6 | 6–6 | 10–3 | — | 7–5 | 10–2 | 7–6 | 5–7 | 8–5 | 8–4 | 5–8 | 4–9 | 5–8 | 5–7 |
| Cleveland | 6–7 | 7–6 | 6–6 | 5–7 | — | 5–8 | 5–7 | 5–8 | 6–6 | 7–6 | 6–6 | 7–5 | 5–7 | 6–7 |
| Detroit | 3–10 | 9–4 | 5–7 | 2–10 | 8–5 | — | 7–5 | 5–8 | 3–9 | 5–8 | 6–6 | 9–3 | 8–4 | 5–8 |
| Kansas City | 4–8 | 5–7 | 5–8 | 6–7 | 7–5 | 5–7 | — | 7–5 | 6–7 | 5–7 | 4–9 | 7–6 | 6–7 | 5–7 |
| Milwaukee | 7–6 | 8–5 | 7–5 | 7–5 | 8–5 | 8–5 | 5–7 | — | 6–6 | 6–7 | 7–5 | 8–4 | 7–5 | 8–5 |
| Minnesota | 6–6 | 9–3 | 11–2 | 5–8 | 6–6 | 9–3 | 7–6 | 6–6 | — | 7–5 | 5–8 | 8–5 | 6–7 | 5–7 |
| New York | 8–5 | 6–7 | 5–7 | 4–8 | 6–7 | 8–5 | 7–5 | 7–6 | 5–7 | — | 6–6 | 6–6 | 6–6 | 2–11 |
| Oakland | 6–6 | 7–5 | 8–5 | 8–5 | 6–6 | 6–6 | 9–4 | 5–7 | 8–5 | 6–6 | — | 12–1 | 9–4 | 6–6 |
| Seattle | 5–7 | 6–6 | 6–7 | 9–4 | 5–7 | 3–9 | 6–7 | 4–8 | 5–8 | 6–6 | 1–12 | — | 4–9 | 4–8 |
| Texas | 5–7 | 8–4 | 4–9 | 8–5 | 7–5 | 4–8 | 7–6 | 5–7 | 7–6 | 6–6 | 4–9 | 9–4 | — | 3–9 |
| Toronto | 8–5 | 6–7 | 7–5 | 7–5 | 7–6 | 8–5 | 7–5 | 5–8 | 7–5 | 11–2 | 6–6 | 8–4 | 9–3 | — |

=== Notable transactions ===
- April 4, 1992: Mario Díaz was signed as a free agent by the Mariners.
- May 29: Díaz was released by the Mariners.
- May 29: Bill Haselman was selected off waivers from the Texas Rangers.
- August 22: The Mariners acquired pitcher Tim Leary and cash from the New York Yankees for minor leaguer Sean Twitty.

== 1992 roster ==
1992 Seattle Mariners
Roster
| Pitchers: 34 Jim Acker; 47 Juan Agosto; 53 Shawn Barton; 15 Kevin Brown; 55 Rich DeLucia; 46 Brian Fisher; 35 Dave Fleming; 50 Mark Grant; 31 Eric Gunderson; 39 Erik Hanson; 47 Gene Harris; 51 Randy Johnson; 52 Calvin Jones; 54 Randy Kramer; 54 Tim Leary; 40 Jeff Nelson; 32 Clay Parker; 48 Dennis Powell; 20 Dave Schmidt; 29 Mike Schooler; 37 Russ Swan; 44 Mike Walker; 42 Kerry Woodson | Catchers: 6,9 Scott Bradley; 15 Bill Haselman; 6 Bert Heffernan; 3 Lance Parrish; 17 Matt Sinatro; 10 Dave Valle; Infielders: 8 Rich Amaral; 38 Mike Blowers; 34 Bret Boone; 33 Patrick Lennon; 11 Edgar Martínez; 23 Tino Martinez; 12 Pete O'Brien; 4 Harold Reynolds; 2 Jeff Schaefer; 20 Shane Turner; 13 Omar Vizquel | Outfielders: 1 Greg Briley; 19 Jay Buhner; 43 Dave Cochrane; 28 Henry Cotto; 24 Ken Griffey Jr.; 44 Dann Howitt; 17,7 Kevin Mitchell; 6 John Moses | Manager: 9 Bill Plummer; Coaches: 16 Gene Clines (hitting); 25 Roger Hansen (bullpen); 22 Rusty Kuntz (first base); 14 Marty Martínez (third base); 5 Russ Nixon (bench); 49 Dan Warthen (pitching) |

=== Player stats ===
| = Indicates team leader |

| = Indicates league leader |

==== Batting ====
===== Starters by position =====
Note: Pos = Position; G = Games played; AB = At bats; H = Hits; Avg. = Batting average; HR = Home runs; RBI = Runs batted in

| Pos | Player | G | AB | H | Avg. | HR | RBI |
|---|---|---|---|---|---|---|---|
| C | Dave Valle | 124 | 367 | 88 | .240 | 9 | 30 |
| 1B | Tino Martinez | 136 | 460 | 118 | .257 | 16 | 66 |
| 2B | Harold Reynolds | 140 | 458 | 113 | .247 | 3 | 33 |
| 3B | Edgar Martínez | 135 | 528 | 181 | .343 | 18 | 73 |
| SS | Omar Vizquel | 136 | 483 | 142 | .294 | 0 | 21 |
| LF | Kevin Mitchell | 99 | 360 | 103 | .286 | 9 | 67 |
| CF | Ken Griffey Jr. | 142 | 565 | 174 | .308 | 27 | 103 |
| RF | Jay Buhner | 152 | 543 | 132 | .243 | 25 | 79 |
| DH | Pete O'Brien | 134 | 396 | 88 | .222 | 14 | 52 |

==== Other batters ====
Note: G = Games played; AB = At bats; H = Hits; Avg. = Batting average; HR = Home runs; RBI = Runs batted in

| Player | G | AB | H | Avg. | HR | RBI |
|---|---|---|---|---|---|---|
| Henry Cotto | 108 | 294 | 76 | .259 | 5 | 27 |
| Greg Briley | 86 | 200 | 55 | .275 | 5 | 12 |
| Lance Parrish | 69 | 192 | 45 | .234 | 8 | 21 |
| Dave Cochrane | 65 | 152 | 38 | .250 | 2 | 12 |
| Bret Boone | 33 | 129 | 25 | .194 | 4 | 15 |
| Rich Amaral | 35 | 100 | 24 | .240 | 1 | 7 |
| Shane Turner | 34 | 74 | 20 | .270 | 0 | 5 |
| Mike Blowers | 31 | 73 | 14 | .192 | 1 | 2 |
| Jeff Schaefer | 65 | 70 | 8 | .114 | 1 | 3 |
| Dann Howitt | 13 | 37 | 10 | .270 | 1 | 8 |
| Matt Sinatro | 18 | 28 | 3 | .107 | 0 | 0 |
| John Moses | 21 | 22 | 3 | .136 | 0 | 1 |
| Bill Haselman | 8 | 19 | 5 | .263 | 0 | 0 |
| Bert Heffernan | 8 | 11 | 1 | .091 | 0 | 1 |
| Patrick Lennon | 1 | 2 | 0 | .000 | 0 | 0 |
| Scott Bradley | 2 | 1 | 0 | .000 | 0 | 0 |

==== Pitching ====
===== Starting pitchers =====
Note: G = Games pitched; IP = Innings pitched; W = Wins; L = Losses; ERA = Earned run average; SO = Strikeouts

| Player | G | IP | W | L | ERA | SO |
|---|---|---|---|---|---|---|
| Dave Fleming | 33 | 228.1 | 17 | 10 | 3.39 | 112 |
| Randy Johnson | 31 | 210.1 | 12 | 14 | 3.77 | 241 |
| Erik Hanson | 31 | 186.2 | 8 | 17 | 4.82 | 112 |
| Tim Leary | 8 | 44.0 | 3 | 4 | 4.91 | 12 |
| Randy Kramer | 4 | 16.1 | 0 | 1 | 7.71 | 6 |

===== Other pitchers =====
Note: G = Games pitched; IP = Innings pitched; W = Wins; L = Losses; ERA = Earned run average; SO = Strikeouts

| Player | G | IP | W | L | ERA | SO |
|---|---|---|---|---|---|---|
| Brian Fisher | 22 | 91.1 | 4 | 3 | 4.53 | 26 |
| Rich DeLucia | 30 | 83.2 | 3 | 6 | 5.49 | 66 |
| Mark Grant | 23 | 81.0 | 2 | 4 | 3.89 | 42 |
| Clay Parker | 8 | 33.1 | 0 | 2 | 7.56 | 20 |
| Mike Walker | 5 | 14.2 | 0 | 3 | 7.36 | 5 |

===== Relief pitchers =====
Note: G = Games pitched; W = Wins; L = Losses; SV = Saves; ERA = Earned run average; SO = Strikeouts

| Player | G | W | L | SV | ERA | SO |
|---|---|---|---|---|---|---|
| Mike Schooler | 53 | 2 | 7 | 13 | 4.70 | 33 |
| Jeff Nelson | 66 | 1 | 7 | 6 | 3.44 | 46 |
| Russ Swan | 55 | 3 | 10 | 9 | 4.74 | 45 |
| Dennis Powell | 49 | 4 | 2 | 0 | 4.58 | 35 |
| Calvin Jones | 38 | 3 | 5 | 0 | 5.69 | 49 |
| Jim Acker | 17 | 0 | 0 | 0 | 5.28 | 11 |
| Juan Agosto | 17 | 0 | 0 | 0 | 5.89 | 12 |
| Shawn Barton | 14 | 0 | 1 | 0 | 2.92 | 4 |
| Eric Gunderson | 9 | 2 | 1 | 0 | 8.68 | 2 |
| Kerry Woodson | 8 | 0 | 1 | 0 | 3.29 | 6 |
| Gene Harris | 8 | 0 | 0 | 0 | 7.00 | 6 |
| Dave Schmidt | 3 | 0 | 0 | 0 | 18.90 | 1 |
| Kevin Brown | 2 | 0 | 0 | 0 | 9.00 | 2 |

== Awards and honors ==
- Randy Johnson, American League strikeouts leader
- Edgar Martínez, MLB batting average champion
- Martínez and Ken Griffey Jr. were selected to the MLB All-Star Game. Martínez won a Silver Slugger Award and Griffey won a Gold Glove Award.

== Farm system ==
| Level | Team | League | Manager |
|---|---|---|---|
| AAA | Calgary Cannons | Pacific Coast League | Keith Bodie |
| AA | Jacksonville Suns | Southern League | Bob Hartsfield |
| A | San Bernardino Spirit | California League | Iván DeJesús |
| A | Peninsula Pilots | Carolina League | Marc Hill |
| A-Short Season | Bellingham Mariners | Northwest League | Dave Myers |
| Rookie | AZL Mariners | Arizona League | Carlos Lezcano |

League Champions: Peninsula
