= 1991 Seattle Mariners season =

1991 Seattle Mariners
- League: American League
- Division: West
- Ballpark: Kingdome
- City: Seattle, Washington
- Record: 83–79 (.512)
- Divisional place: 5th
- Owner: Jeff Smulyan
- General manager: Woody Woodward
- Manager: Jim Lefebvre
- Average attendance: 26,517
- Television: KSTW-TV 11 (Dave Niehaus, Rick Rizzs, Joe Simpson); KIRO-TV 7 (Greg Gumbel, Joe Simpson)
- Radio: KIRO 710 AM (Dave Niehaus, Rick Rizzs, Joe Simpson)

The 1991 Seattle Mariners season was the 15th since the franchise's creation. It was the first winning season in franchise history, as the Mariners finished fifth in the American League West with a record of 83–79 (.512). Home attendance at the Kingdome was the highest to date, exceeding 2.1 million.

After the season, the contract of third-year manager Jim Lefebvre was not renewed despite his performance, and he was succeeded by third-base coach Bill Plummer in 1992.

This was the last full season under the ownership of Jeff Smulyan; the club was sold the following July.

== Offseason ==
- November 25, 1990: Rich Amaral was signed as a free agent by the Mariners.

== Regular season ==
- July 18, 1991: Ken Griffey Jr. and Omar Vizquel each had five hits in one game at Milwaukee.
- September 30: Nolan Ryan of the Texas Rangers struck out Tino Martinez of the M's for the 5,500th strikeout in his career. Griffey, age 21, became the youngest player in 35 years to reach 100 RBI in a season.
- October 4: The Mariners defeated the Chicago White Sox to win their 82nd game, guaranteeing with their first winning season in franchise history.

=== Season standings ===
AL West
Team	W	L	Pct.	GB	Home	Road
Minnesota Twins	95	67	.586	—	51‍–‍30	44‍–‍37
Chicago White Sox	87	75	.537	8	46‍–‍35	41‍–‍40
Texas Rangers	85	77	.525	10	46‍–‍35	39‍–‍42
Oakland Athletics	84	78	.519	11	47‍–‍34	37‍–‍44
Seattle Mariners	83	79	.512	12	45‍–‍36	38‍–‍43
Kansas City Royals	82	80	.506	13	40‍–‍41	42‍–‍39
California Angels	81	81	.500	14	40‍–‍41	41‍–‍40

=== Record vs. opponents ===
1991 American League record Sources:
Team	BAL	BOS	CAL	CWS	CLE	DET	KC	MIL	MIN	NYY	OAK	SEA	TEX	TOR
Baltimore	—	8–5	6–6	4–8	7–6	5–8	4–8	3–10	4–8	5–8	3–9	4–8	9–3	5–8
Boston	5–8	—	4–8	7–5	9–4	5–8	7–5	7–6	3–9	6–7	8–4	9–3	5–7	9–4
California	6–6	8–4	—	8–5	7–5	5–7	9–4	6–6	8–5	6–6	1–12	6–7	5–8	6–6
Chicago	8–4	5–7	5–8	—	6–6	4–8	7–6	7–5	8–5	8–4	7–6	7–6	8–5	7–5
Cleveland	6–7	4–9	5–7	6–6	—	7–6	4–8	5–8	2–10	6–7	5–7	2–10	4–8	1–12
Detroit	8–5	8–5	7–5	8–4	6–7	—	8–4	4–9	4–8	8–5	4–8	8–4	6–6	5–8
Kansas City	8–4	5–7	4–9	6–7	8–4	4–8	—	9–3	6–7	7–5	6–7	7–6	7–6	5–7
Milwaukee	10–3	6–7	6–6	5–7	8–5	9–4	3–9	—	6–6	6–7	8–4	3–9	7–5	6–7
Minnesota	8–4	9–3	5–8	5–8	10–2	8–4	7–6	6–6	—	10–2	8–5	9–4	6–7	4–8
New York	8–5	7–6	6–6	4–8	7–6	5–8	5–7	7–6	2–10	—	6–6	3–9	5–7	6–7
Oakland	9–3	4–8	12–1	6–7	7–5	8–4	7–6	4–8	5–8	6–6	—	6–7	4–9	6–6
Seattle	8–4	3–9	7–6	6–7	10–2	4–8	6–7	9–3	4–9	9–3	7–6	—	5–8	5–7
Texas	3–9	7–5	8–5	5–8	8–4	6–6	6–7	5–7	7–6	7–5	9–4	8–5	—	6–6
Toronto	8–5	4–9	6–6	5–7	12–1	8–5	7–5	7–6	8–4	7–6	6–6	7–5	6–6	—

=== Notable transactions ===
- May 17, 1991: The Mariners traded cash and a player to be named later to the New York Yankees for Mike Blowers; Jim Blueberg (minors) was sent to the Yankees on June 22.
- June 22: Randy Kramer signed with the Mariners.

=== Roster ===
1991 Seattle Mariners
Roster
Pitchers: 15 Scott Bankhead; 34 Dave Burba; 32 Keith Comstock; 55 Rich DeLucia; 56 Dave Fleming; 39 Erik Hanson; 47 Gene Harris; 36 Brian Holman; 38 Mike Jackson; 51 Randy Johnson; 52 Calvin Jones; 44 Bill Krueger; 46 Rob Murphy; 23 Pat Rice; 40 Mike Schooler; 37 Russ Swan; 18 Bill Swift	Catchers: 9 Scott Bradley; 45 Chris Howard; 17 Matt Sinatro; 10 Dave Valle; Infielders: 8 Rich Amaral; 21 Alvin Davis; 11 Edgar Martínez; 14 Tino Martinez; 12 Pete O'Brien; 4 Harold Reynolds; 2 Jeff Schaefer; 13 Omar Vizquel	Outfielders: 1 Greg Briley; 19 Jay Buhner; 43 Dave Cochrane; 28 Henry Cotto; 30 Ken Griffey; 24 Ken Griffey Jr.; 25 Tracy Jones; 26 Patrick Lennon; 7 Alonzo Powell	Manager: 5 Jim Lefebvre; Coaches: 6 Ron Clark (bench); 16 Gene Clines (hitting); 22 Rusty Kuntz (first base); 20 Mike Paul (pitching); 3 Bill Plummer (third base); 49 Dan Warthen (bullpen)

== Game log ==
=== Regular season ===
1991 regular season game log: 83–79 (Home: 45–36; Away: 38–43)
April: 10–11 (Home: 6–3; Away: 4–8)

#	Date	Time (PT)	Opponent	Score	Win	Loss	Save	Time of Game	Attendance	Record	Box/ Streak

May: 15–12 (Home: 8–7; Away: 7–5)

#	Date	Time (PT)	Opponent	Score	Win	Loss	Save	Time of Game	Attendance	Record	Box/ Streak

June: 14–13 (Home: 6–4; Away: 8–9)

#	Date	Time (PT)	Opponent	Score	Win	Loss	Save	Time of Game	Attendance	Record	Box/ Streak

July: 15–12 (Home: 8–7; Away: 7–5)

#	Date	Time (PT)	Opponent	Score	Win	Loss	Save	Time of Game	Attendance	Record	Box/ Streak

August: 13–15 (Home: 10–6; Away: 3–9)

#	Date	Time (PT)	Opponent	Score	Win	Loss	Save	Time of Game	Attendance	Record	Box/ Streak

September: 12–15 (Home: 5–8; Away: 7–7)

#	Date	Time (PT)	Opponent	Score	Win	Loss	Save	Time of Game	Attendance	Record	Box/ Streak

October: 4–1 (Home: 2–1; Away: 2–0)

#	Date	Time (PT)	Opponent	Score	Win	Loss	Save	Time of Game	Attendance	Record	Box/ Streak

Legend: = Win = Loss = Postponement
Bold = Mariners team member

== Player stats ==
= Indicates team leader

=== Batting ===
==== Starters by position ====
Note: Pos = Position; G = Games played; AB = At bats; H = Hits; Avg. = Batting average; HR = Home runs; RBI = Runs batted in

Pos	Player	G	AB	H	Avg.	HR	RBI
C	Dave Valle	132	324	63	.194	8	32
1B	Pete O'Brien	152	560	139	.248	17	88
2B	Harold Reynolds	161	631	160	.254	3	57
3B	Edgar Martínez	150	544	167	.307	14	52
SS	Omar Vizquel	142	426	98	.230	1	41
LF	Greg Briley	139	381	99	.260	2	26
CF	Ken Griffey Jr.	154	548	179	.327	22	100
RF	Jay Buhner	137	406	99	.244	27	77
DH	Alvin Davis	145	462	102	.221	12	69

==== Other batters ====
Note: G = Games played; AB = At bats; H = Hits; Avg. = Batting average; HR = Home runs; RBI = Runs batted in

Player	G	AB	H	Avg.	HR	RBI
Dave Cochrane	65	178	44	.247	2	22
Henry Cotto	66	177	54	.305	6	23
Tracy Jones	79	175	44	.251	3	24
Scott Bradley	83	172	35	.203	0	11
Jeff Schaefer	84	164	41	.250	1	11
Tino Martinez	36	112	23	.205	4	9
Alonzo Powell	57	111	24	.216	3	12
Ken Griffey Sr.	30	85	24	.282	1	9
Rich Amaral	14	16	1	.063	0	0
Patrick Lennon	9	8	1	.125	0	1
Matt Sinatro	5	8	2	.250	0	1
Chris Howard	9	6	1	.167	0	0

=== Pitching ===
==== Starting pitchers ====
Note: G = Games pitched; IP = Innings pitched; W = Wins; L = Losses; ERA = Earned run average; SO = Strikeouts

Player	G	IP	W	L	ERA	SO
Randy Johnson	33	201.1	13	10	3.98	228
Brian Holman	30	195.1	13	14	3.69	108
Rich DeLucia	32	182.0	12	13	5.09	98
Bill Krueger	35	175.0	11	8	3.60	91
Erik Hanson	27	174.2	8	8	3.81	143

==== Other pitchers ====
Note: G = Games pitched; IP = Innings pitched; W = Wins; L = Losses; ERA = Earned run average; SO = Strikeouts

Player	G	IP	W	L	ERA	SO
Scott Bankhead	17	60.2	3	6	4.90	28
Pat Rice	7	21.0	1	1	3.00	12
Dave Fleming	9	17.2	1	0	6.62	11

==== Relief pitchers ====
Note: G = Games pitched; W = Wins; L = Losses; SV = Saves; ERA = Earned run average; SO = Strikeouts

Player	G	W	L	SV	ERA	SO
Bill Swift	71	1	2	17	1.99	48
Mike Jackson	72	7	7	14	3.25	74
Russ Swan	63	6	2	2	3.43	33
Rob Murphy	57	0	1	4	3.00	34
Mike Schooler	34	3	3	7	3.67	31
Calvin Jones	27	2	2	2	2.53	42
Dave Burba	22	2	2	1	3.68	16
Gene Harris	8	0	0	1	4.05	6
Keith Comstock	1	0	0	0	54.00	0

== Awards and honors ==
- Harold Reynolds won the Roberto Clemente Award
- Ken Griffey Jr. was the team's lone All-Star Game selection and won a Gold Glove Award.

== Farm system ==
Level	Team	League	Manager
AAA	Calgary Cannons	Pacific Coast League	Keith Bodie
AA	Jacksonville Suns	Southern League	Jim Nettles
A	San Bernardino Spirit	California League	Tommy Jones
A	Peninsula Pilots	Carolina League	Steve Smith
A-Short Season	Bellingham Mariners	Northwest League	Dave Myers
Rookie	AZL Mariners	Arizona League	Myron Pines
