= Andy Cook (baseball) =

American baseball player (born 1967)

- Pitcher
- Born: August 30, 1967 (age 58); Memphis, Tennessee
- Batted: Right Threw: Right

MLB debut
- May 9, 1993, for the New York Yankees

Last MLB appearance
- May 24, 1993, for the New York Yankees

MLB statistics
- Win–loss record: 0-1
- Earned run average: 5.06
- Strikeouts: 4
- Stats at Baseball Reference

Teams
- New York Yankees (1993)

Andrew Bernard Cook (born August 30, 1967) is a former professional baseball pitcher. He pitched in four games in Major League Baseball for the New York Yankees in 1993.

A native of Memphis, Tennessee, he attended Christian Brothers High School and the University of Memphis. In 1988, he played collegiate summer baseball with the Chatham A's of the Cape Cod Baseball League. He was selected by the Yankees in the 11th round of the 1988 MLB draft.

== Sources ==
- Career statistics from Baseball Reference · Baseball Reference (Minors) · Retrosheet · Baseball Almanac
