= Shawn Barton =

American baseball player

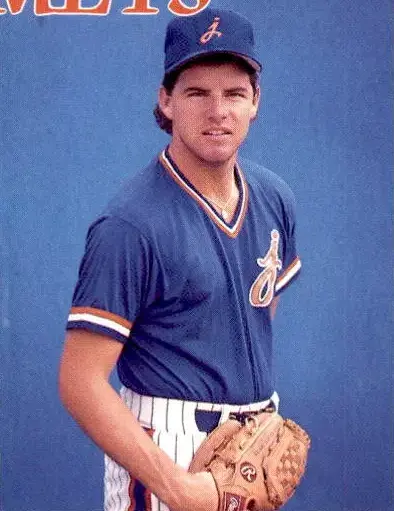
- Barton with the Jackson Mets c. 1988
- Pitcher
- Born: May 14, 1963 (age 62); Los Angeles, California, U.S.
- Batted: Right Threw: Left

MLB debut
- August 6, 1992, for the Seattle Mariners

Last MLB appearance
- September 6, 1996, for the San Francisco Giants

MLB statistics
- Win–loss record: 4–2
- Earned run average: 4.71
- Strikeouts: 29
- Stats at Baseball Reference

Teams
- Seattle Mariners (1992); San Francisco Giants (1995–1996)

Shawn Edward Barton (born May 14, 1963) is an American professional baseball scout and a former Major League Baseball relief pitcher who appeared in 73 games pitched for the Seattle Mariners (1992) and San Francisco Giants (1995–1996). He threw left-handed, batted right-handed, stood 6 feet 3 inches (1.91 m) tall and weighed 195 pounds (88 kg).

== Career ==
Barton attended the University of Nevada, Reno, and was selected by the Philadelphia Phillies in the 21st round of the 1984 Major League Baseball draft. He later passed into the organizations of the New York Mets and Atlanta Braves before signing with the Mariners as a free agent. He made his MLB debut with them, at age 29, in August 1992 and worked in 14 games and 12 1/3 innings pitched during the course of the season, allowed ten hits and seven bases on balls, and compiled an earned run average of 2.92, with no decisions and no saves. However, he spent all of 1993 with the Mariners' Triple-A affiliate, the Calgary Cannons, and was released at the end of the campaign.

Signed by the Giants, he spent all of 1994 and the early weeks of 1995 with the Triple-A Phoenix Firebirds before his recall in May. Used largely in short relief and as a situational lefty, he worked in 51 games for the Giants over the remainder of the season, winning four of five decisions and notching one save. In 44 1/3 innings, he gave up 37 hits and 19 bases on balls. However, his earned run average rose to 4.26.

In 1996, he began the season with the Giants and was effective in his first three outings. However, his ineffectiveness in his next four appearances resulted in his demotion to Phoenix, where he spent the rest of his final active season.

Altogether, as a Major Leaguer, he gave up 66 hits and 27 walks in 65 innings, with 29 strikeouts.

Barton remained in the game, however, as a minor league pitching coach in the Giants' and Los Angeles Dodgers' farm systems, and an area scout for the Arizona Diamondbacks.
