= Doug Linton =

American baseball player (born 1965)

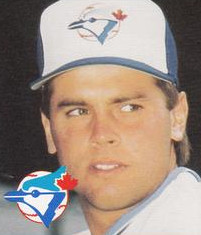
- Linton in 1988
- Pitcher
- Born: February 9, 1965 (age 61); Santa Ana, California, U.S.
- Batted: Right Threw: Right

MLB debut
- August 3, 1992, for the Toronto Blue Jays

Last MLB appearance
- April 18, 2003, for the Toronto Blue Jays

MLB statistics
- Win–loss record: 17–20
- Earned run average: 5.78
- Strikeouts: 206
- Stats at Baseball Reference

Teams
- Toronto Blue Jays (1992–1993); California Angels (1993); New York Mets (1994); Kansas City Royals (1995–1996); Baltimore Orioles (1999); LG Twins (2002); Toronto Blue Jays (2003); Uni-President Lions (2005)

Douglas Warren Linton (born February 9, 1965) is a former professional baseball pitcher. He played all or parts of seven seasons in Major League Baseball between 1992 and 2003 for the Toronto Blue Jays, California Angels, New York Mets, Kansas City Royals, and Baltimore Orioles, mostly as a relief pitcher. He also played one season in the KBO League for the LG Twins in 2002. He is currently the pitching coach for the Colorado Springs Sky Sox.

== Early life ==
Linton attended Canyon High School in Anaheim, California. He attended the University of California, Irvine, where he played college baseball for the Anteaters from 1984–1986.

== Playing career ==
=== Toronto Blue Jays ===
Linton was drafted by the Toronto Blue Jays in the 43rd round of the 1986 Major League Baseball draft, signing with the Blue Jays on September 5, 1986. He made his professional baseball debut with the Myrtle Beach Blue Jays of the South Atlantic League in 1987, where he had a very impressive season, earning a 14–2 record and a 1.73 ERA in 21 games. He was promoted to the Knoxville Blue Jays of the Southern League late in the year. He pitched in only one game for Knoxville, allowing three runs in three innings.

Linton spent the 1988 season with the Dunedin Blue Jays of the Florida State League. An injury cut his season short, and he appeared in just twelve games, all in relief. He had a 2–1 record with a 1.63 ERA in 27.2 innings. He split the 1989 season with Dunedin and Knoxville, where he posted a combined record of 6–6 with a 2.68 ERA in 23 games, 14 of them starts.

Linton was promoted to the Syracuse Chiefs of the International League for the 1990 season, where he had a 10–10 record with a 3.40 ERA in 26 starts. He returned to Syracuse in 1991, posting a 10–12 record with a 5.01 ERA in 30 games.

He began the season with the Chiefs once again in 1992, where he had a 12–10 record with a 3.74 ERA in 25 starts, earning a call-up from the Toronto Blue Jays. Linton made his Blue Jays debut on August 3, 1992, where he pitched 3.2 innings out of the bullpen, allowing one run and striking out four as Toronto lost 7–1 to the Boston Red Sox at Fenway Park. He made his first major league start on August 13, as Linton pitched eight innings, allowing two runs and striking out four, as the Blue Jays defeated the Baltimore Orioles 4–2 at SkyDome to earn his first major league victory. Linton struggled after that game, allowing 19 earned runs in six innings over four appearances, and was sent back to the Chiefs at the end of August. Linton had a 1–3 record with an 8.62 ERA with Toronto.

Linton began the 1993 season with the Syracuse Chiefs, posting a 2–6 record with them with a 5.36 ERA, as well as playing in four games with Toronto, with a 0–1 record and a 6.55 ERA before being selected off waivers by the California Angels on June 17.

=== California Angels ===
He made his Angels debut on June 20, 1993, allowing a run in 1.1 innings pitched as the Chicago White Sox defeated the Angels 11–6 at Anaheim Stadium. He earned his first Angels victory on July 7, pitching a scoreless ninth inning as California defeated the Boston Red Sox 7–6. The Angels released Linton on September 14, at which time Linton had a 2–0 record with a 7.71 ERA in 19 games, all out of the bullpen.

=== New York Mets ===
The New York Mets signed Linton on December 17, 1993. Linton made his Mets debut on April 8, 1994 in a 6–3 loss to the Houston Astros at The Astrodome, working out of the bullpen. He made 32 appearances with New York, having a solid record of 6–2 with a 4.47 ERA. In July he was sent to the Norfolk Tides of the International League, where Linton had a 2–1 record with 2.00 ERA.

After the season, Linton became a free agent, and signed with the Kansas City Royals on April 25, 1995.

=== Kansas City Royals ===
Linton made his Royals debut working out of the bullpen on April 29, 1995, allowing 3 runs in 3.2 innings as Kansas City lost 10–3 to the New York Yankees at Kauffman Stadium. He made his first Royals start on May 5 against the Chicago White Sox, allowing only one run in eight innings with four strikeouts, however, he had to settle for a no-decision before the Royals won the game in extra innings. Linton was crushed in his next start, allowing ten runs in five innings in a 10–0 loss to the Cleveland Indians. He was sent to the Omaha Royals at the end of May, where he spent the rest of the season, compiling a 7–7 record with a 4.40 ERA in 18 starts. His numbers in Kansas City were 0–1 with a 7.25 ERA in seven games.

After re-signing with Kansas City for the 1996 season, he began the year in Omaha, where he started four games with a 2–1 record and a 4.76 ERA before earning a call-up to Kansas City. Linton set a career high in wins with Kansas City, as he had a 7–9 record with a 5.02 ERA in 21 games and a career high 104 innings pitched. The Royals released Linton on March 4, 1997.

=== Yankees and Twins ===
Linton sat out the 1997 season due to injury, then later signed a contract with the New York Yankees on January 26, 1998, however, he was released during spring training on March 14.

Linton next signed a contract with the Minnesota Twins on May 26, and spent the season with the Twins AAA affiliate, the Salt Lake Buzz of the Pacific Coast League. Linton played in 18 games, making 14 starts, as he had a 4–4 record with a 5.99 ERA with the Buzz. He became a free agent after the season.

=== Baltimore Orioles ===
On December 17, 1998, Linton signed with the Baltimore Orioles and began the 1999 season with the club making his Orioles debut on April 11, 1999 at Camden Yards, starting against the Toronto Blue Jays. Linton allowed two runs through five innings receiving a no-decision in the Orioles 9–5 loss. He lost his next start, 7–4, also to Toronto at SkyDome, and was demoted first to the Orioles bullpen, then to their Triple-A affiliate, the Rochester Red Wings of the International League. There, he pitched well, compiling a 7–5 record with a 3.65 ERA, earning a promotion back to the O's, finishing the year in Baltimore as a full-time starter pitching his best game on September 4, allowing one run in seven innings as Baltimore defeated the Cleveland Indians 3–1. He finished the year with a 1–4 record and a 5.95 ERA with the Orioles, but was released on December 7.

=== Colorado Rockies ===
On February 21, 2000, Linton agreed to a contract with the Colorado Rockies and was sent to their AAA affiliate, the Colorado Springs Sky Sox of the Pacific Coast League at the end of Spring Training, spending the season with the Sky Sox, posting a record of 10–13 with a 5.38 ERA in 28 starts.

=== Dodgers, Mets, and Korea ===
Linton signed as a free agent with the Los Angeles Dodgers on January 15, 2001, however, he was released at the end of Spring Training on April 1.

Linton next came back for his second stint in the New York Mets organization, signing as a free agent on May 9, 2001 and was assigned to their AAA affiliate the Norfolk Tides of the International League, compiling a 7–3 record with a 3.21 ERA in 12 starts before being sold to the LG Twins of the Korea Baseball Organization, where he finished the 2001 season.

=== Atlanta Braves ===
On January 16, 2002, Linton agreed to a deal with the Atlanta Braves. He would have another very solid season in AAA, where he played for the Richmond Braves of the International League. Despite a 9–11 record, Linton had a very solid ERA of 2.53, as well as 160 strikeouts in 174 innings pitched. He started the Triple A All-Star for the International League against the Pacific Coast League.

=== Return to the Blue Jays ===
Linton returned to the Toronto Blue Jays organization as he signed as a free agent on October 23, 2002. He won a job in the Blue Jays bullpen in spring training, and started the year in Toronto. Linton made his return in a Blue Jays uniform on March 31, 2003, when he pitched two scoreless innings in relief as Toronto lost 8–4 to the Yankees. He appeared in seven games with Toronto, having a 0–0 record and a 3.00 ERA in nine innings before being sent to the Syracuse SkyChiefs. In Syracuse, Linton struggled badly, posting a record of 2–10 with a 5.28 ERA in 32 appearances.

=== Return to the Royals ===
Linton would sign with the Kansas City Royals on January 16, 2004, and after a start with the Wichita Wranglers of the Texas League in which Linton pitched 5.1 innings, allowing only one run, he was promoted to the Omaha Royals of the Pacific Coast League. In Omaha, Linton had a tough season, going 3–9 with a 7.59 ERA in 27 games. After the season, he announced his retirement from the game.

== Coaching career ==
Linton was formerly the pitching coach for the Asheville TouristsTri-City Dust Devils and Modesto Nuts, and is currently the pitching coach for the Sky Sox. Minor league pitching coordinator for the Colorado Rockies.
