= Sam Militello =

American baseball player

- Pitcher
- Born: November 26, 1969 (age 56); Tampa, Florida, U.S.
- Batted: Right Threw: Right

MLB debut
- August 9, 1992, for the New York Yankees

Last MLB appearance
- April 22, 1993, for the New York Yankees

MLB statistics
- Win–loss record: 4–4
- Earned run average: 3.89
- Strikeouts: 47
- Stats at Baseball Reference

Teams
- New York Yankees (1992–1993)

Sam Salvatore Militello Jr. (born November 26, 1969) is a former Major League Baseball pitcher who played for the New York Yankees in 1992 and 1993. In 12 career games, he had a 4–4 record with a 3.89 ERA. He batted and threw right-handed.

== Amateur career ==
Militello attended the University of Tampa, where he played for the Tampa Spartans baseball team. In 1989, he played collegiate summer baseball with the Falmouth Commodores of the Cape Cod Baseball League and was named a league all-star. The New York Yankees selected Militello in the sixth round of the 1990 Major League Baseball draft.

== Professional career ==
Militello made his professional debut in 1990, with the Oneonta Yankees, and led the Short-Season New York–Penn League with 119 strikeouts and his 1.22 ERA was second in the league. The following year, he was the Pitcher of the Year in the Carolina League after compiling a 12–2 record with a 1.22 ERA and 113 strikeouts in 103 innings for the Prince William Cannons. He finished the year with the AA Albany-Colonie Yankees, with whom he put up a 2–2, 2.35 record in 7 starts. In 1992, he was named the International League Most Valuable Pitcher when he compiled another 12–2 record, with a league-leading 2.29 ERA, in 22 games with the Columbus Clippers. He made his Major League debut with the 1992 New York Yankees at the end of the year, going 3–3 in 9 starts. However, his promising career was cut short by injuries and wildness.

== Coaching career ==
Militello is an associate head coach for Joe Urso at the University of Tampa. He has been an assistant at UT since 2001. Miltello was a pitching coach in the Cleveland Indians chain in 1999–2000 for the Burlington Indians and Columbus RedStixx.
