= Jim Lefebvre =

American baseball player and manager (born 1942)

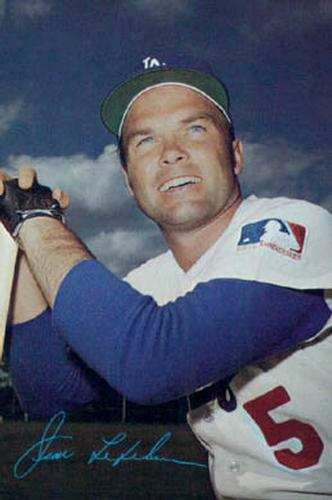
- Lefebvre with the Los Angeles Dodgers in 1971
- Second baseman / Third baseman / Manager
- Born: January 7, 1942 (age 84); Inglewood, California, U.S.
- Batted: Switch Threw: Right

MLB debut
- April 12, 1965, for the Los Angeles Dodgers

Last MLB appearance
- September 19, 1972, for the Los Angeles Dodgers

MLB statistics
- Batting average: .251
- Home runs: 74
- Runs batted in: 404
- Managerial record: 417–442
- Winning %: .485

NPB statistics
- Batting average: .263
- Home runs: 60
- Runs batted in: 176
- Stats at Baseball Reference
- Managerial record at Baseball Reference

Teams
- As player: Los Angeles Dodgers (1965–1972); Lotte Orions (1973–1976); As manager: Seattle Mariners (1989–1991); Chicago Cubs (1992–1993); Milwaukee Brewers (1999); As coach: Los Angeles Dodgers (1979); San Francisco Giants (1980–1982); Oakland Athletics (1987–1988, 1994–1995); Milwaukee Brewers (1998–1999); Cincinnati Reds (2002); San Diego Padres (2009)

Career highlights and awards
- All-Star (1966); World Series champion (1965); Japan Series champion (1974); NL Rookie of the Year (1965)

James Kenneth Lefebvre (/ləˈfiːvər/ lə-FEE-ver; born January 7, 1942) is an American former professional infielder, coach, and manager in Major League Baseball (MLB). He won the National League Rookie of the Year in 1965 with the Los Angeles Dodgers as the team won the World Series. He started in the MLB All-Star Game the following season.

Lefebvre was the manager of the Seattle Mariners from 1989 to 1991, the Chicago Cubs in 1992 and 1993, and the Milwaukee Brewers in part of 1999. He was a coach for six MLB teams.

== Baseball career ==
=== Playing career ===
Lefebvre was signed by the Los Angeles Dodgers as an amateur free agent in 1962. He was the 1965 National League Rookie of the Year; he hit .250 with 12 home runs and 69 RBI in 157 games, helping the Dodgers win the World Series. That season, he was part of an infield for the Dodgers that consisted of four players who were switch hitters. The others were Jim Gilliam, Wes Parker, and Maury Wills. In 1966, Lefebvre batted .274 with 24 home runs and 74 RBI in 152 games. He also started at second base in the MLB All-Star Game.

Lefebvre also played four seasons in Japan, from 1973 until 1976, for the Lotte Orions. Lefebvre became only the second player, after Johnny Logan, to have won a World Series and a Japan Series with the 1974 Lotte Orions.

=== Managerial and coaching career ===
Lefebvre was first hired as a major league manager by the Seattle Mariners in November 1988, with a two-year contract at $150,000 annually, with incentives and a team option for a third year. In his second season in 1990, Seattle won 77 games and drew over 1.5 million in home attendance at the Kingdome. In 1991, the Mariners posted their first-ever winning record at 83–79 (.512) and drew over 2.1 million, but Lefebvre's contract was not extended. He was succeeded by third base coach Bill Plummer. With Seattle, Lefebvre had a record of 233 wins and 253 losses. Lefebvre was soon hired by the Chicago Cubs in November and led them during the 1992 and 1993 seasons; he was released again after a posting a winning record, Chicago was 84–78 (.519) in the 1993 season. With the Milwaukee Brewers, he was the interim manager for the final seven weeks of the 1999 season.

In addition to managing, Lefebvre was a coach for the Dodgers, Brewers, San Francisco Giants, Oakland Athletics, Cincinnati Reds, and San Diego Padres. He managed the China national baseball team in 2005, the 2006 World Baseball Classic, and 2008 Olympics.

=== Managerial record ===
Team	From	To	Regular season record				Post–season record			
Team	From	To	G	W	L	Win %	G	W	L	Win %
Seattle Mariners	1989	1991	486	233	253	.479	DNQ			
Chicago Cubs	1992	1993	324	162	162	.500	DNQ			
Milwaukee Brewers	1999	1999	49	22	29	.431	DNQ			
Total			859	417	442	.485	0	0	0	–
Ref.:

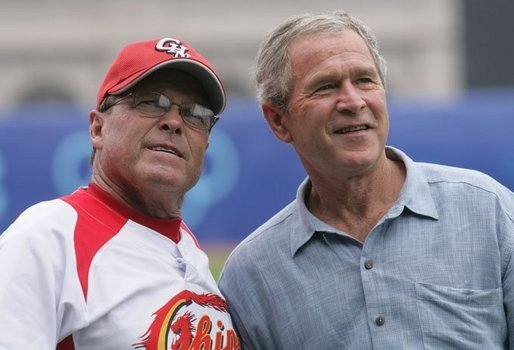
Lefebvre, as manager of China, and President George W. Bush at the 2008 Summer Olympics

== Outside of baseball ==
Lefebvre had roles on several television shows including Gilligan's Island and Batman. His role in Batman was of a henchman for the Riddler. He is also a spokesman for Vemma vitamin supplements.

== Personal life ==
Lefebvre first married Jean Bakke from Waterford, Wisconsin, and they had their son, Ryan, when Lefebvre was playing baseball in Japan. Ryan is the a play-by-play announcer for the Kansas City Royals. Lefebvre has a daughter, Brittany, who has worked in Christian motion pictures, and two other children, .

Preceded by Jim Gilliam	Los Angeles Dodgers Hitting Coach; 1979	Succeeded by Manny Mota
