= Pat Rice (baseball) =

American baseball player and coach (born 1963)

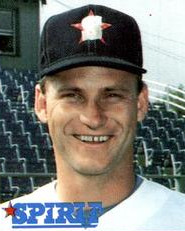
- Rice in 1988
- Pitcher
- Born: November 2, 1963 (age 61); Rapid City, South Dakota, U.S.
- Batted: Right Threw: Right

MLB debut
- May 18, 1991, for the Seattle Mariners

Last MLB appearance
- June 16, 1991, for the Seattle Mariners

MLB statistics
- Win–loss record: 1–1
- Earned run average: 3.00
- Strikeouts: 12
- Stats at Baseball Reference

Teams
- Seattle Mariners (1991)

Patrick Edward Rice (born November 2, 1963) is an American former professional baseball pitcher and coach. He pitched in 7 games for the Seattle Mariners of Major League Baseball (MLB) in 1991.

Rice grew up in a Air Force family which eventually settled in Colorado Springs where he attended Air Academy High School. He then attended the University of Arkansas. He signed with the Mariners as an undrafted free agent in 1986.

After several years in the minors, Rice debuted with the Mariners on May 18, 1991, starting and earning a win over the New York Yankees. After 5 multi-inning relief appearances, he made one final start in the majors, taking the loss and not lasting three innings against the Detroit Tigers on June 16. He continued to pitch for the Triple-A Calgary Cannons through 1992.

In 1995, Rice attempted to comeback as a replacement player in spring training for the Mariners during the ongoing strike. After being released in March, he agreed to be the pitching coach for the team's Low-A affiliate, the Wisconsin Timber Rattlers. He coached there through 1997, then was the pitching coach for the Orlando Ray in 1998 and New Haven Ravens in 1999, both Double-A teams. From 2000–2007, he was the minor league pitching coordinator for the Mariners.

Rice left the Mariners' organization in 2008 to become the pitching coach for the Single-A San Jose Giants in the San Francisco Giants organization. On December 15, 2008, he was announced as the pitching coach for the Triple-A Fresno Grizzlies. Rice left the Giants organization after 2013 season. The Los Angeles Angels of Anaheim then hired him to be the pitching coach for the Double A Arkansas Travelers. In 2015, he was named the pitching coordinator of the upper level for the Angels. Rice was hired by the Washington Nationals to be the pitching coach for the Low-A Fredericksburg Nationals during their inaugural season in 2021. Rice lasted one season with the team.

Rice's son Stephen Rice was the play by play broadcaster for the Fresno Grizzlies, now the Single-A affiliate of the Colorado Rockies, in 2023.
