= Mike Hart (outfielder, born 1951) =

American baseball player

- Outfielder
- Born: December 20, 1951 (age 74); Kalamazoo, Michigan, U.S.
- Batted: Both Threw: Right

MLB debut
- June 12, 1980, for the Texas Rangers

Last MLB appearance
- June 22, 1980, for the Texas Rangers

MLB statistics
- Batting average: .250
- Home runs: 0
- Runs batted in: 0
- Stats at Baseball Reference

Teams
- Texas Rangers (1980)

James Michael Hart (born December 20, 1951) is an American former Major League Baseball (MLB) outfielder. He played five games for the Texas Rangers in 1980, getting one hit in four at bats. Following his major league career, Hart has had a long career as a minor league manager and coach. His most recent managerial stint was in 1998 with the Shreveport Captains.

== Sources ==
- Career statistics from Baseball Reference · Baseball Reference (Minors) · Retrosheet · Baseball Almanac
- Retrosheet
