= Hensley Meulens =

Curaçaoan baseball player & coach (born 1967)

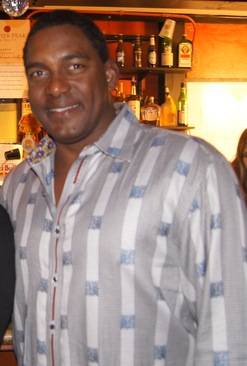
- Meulens in 2011

Leones de Yucatán
- Outfielder / Coach
- Born: June 23, 1967 (age 59); Willemstad, Curaçao
- Batted: Right Threw: Right

Professional debut
- MLB: August 23, 1989, for the New York Yankees
- NPB: April 9, 1994, for the Chiba Lotte Marines
- KBO: 2000, for the SK Wyverns

Last appearance
- NPB: October 2, 1996, for the Yakult Swallows
- MLB: May 14, 1998, for the Arizona Diamondbacks
- KBO: 2000, for the SK Wyverns

MLB statistics
- Batting average: .220
- Home runs: 15
- Runs batted in: 53

NPB statistics
- Batting average: .246
- Home runs: 77
- Runs batted in: 216

KBO statistics
- Batting average: .196
- Home runs: 1
- Runs batted in: 3
- Stats at Baseball Reference

Teams
- As player: New York Yankees (1989–1993); Chiba Lotte Marines (1994); Yakult Swallows (1995–1996); Montreal Expos (1997); Arizona Diamondbacks (1998); SK Wyverns (2000); As coach: San Francisco Giants (2010–2019); New York Mets (2020); New York Yankees (2022); Colorado Rockies (2023–2025)

Career highlights and awards
- As player: Japan Series champion (1995); As coach: 3× World Series champion (2010, 2012, 2014)

Hensley Filemon Acasio Meulens (MEW-lens, Papiamento pronunciation: [ˈhɛnsli ˈmʏiləns]; born June 23, 1967), nicknamed "Bam Bam", is a Curaçaoan professional baseball coach and former player. He is currently the manager for the Leones de Yucatán of the Mexican League. Meulens was also the longtime manager of the Netherlands national baseball team, from 2013 to 2023.

A native of Curaçao, he played from 1989 to 2000 in MLB, Nippon Professional Baseball, and the KBO League. He was the first Curaçaoan to play in MLB and the Dominican winter league.

Hitting home runs left-handed while playing softball as a teenager earned Meulens the nickname "Bam Bam", when his friends compared his power to the Flintstones cartoon character.

== Professional career ==
=== Minor leagues ===
Hensley Meulens was signed by the New York Yankees as an undrafted free agent in 1985. After struggling in his first professional season in 1986 with the Gulf Coast Yankees, Meulens made a splash in 1987 with Single-A Prince William, hitting .300 with 28 home runs and 103 RBI, also being named to the Carolina League All-Star team. His hitting cooled somewhat in 1988 and 1989 as he split time between the Double-A Albany-Colonie Yankees of the Eastern League and the Triple-A Columbus Clippers of the International League.

His bat rebounded in 1990 for Columbus, as he helped lead the team to the 1990 International League championships (where they ultimately lost to Rochester), hitting .285 with 26 HR and 96 RBI, and was named the 1990 International League MVP. Meulens' impressive 1990 season earned him a spot on the Yankees roster in 1991, but he was back in Columbus in 1992, when he led the International League in home runs in 1992.

=== New York Yankees (1989–1993) ===
Meulens made his major league debut with the New York Yankees on August 23, 1989. Meulens never attained a permanent spot on the New York lineup, despite spending the entire 1991 season on the Yankees roster. Meulens struck out in 31 percent of plate appearances that season and platooned in left field with Mel Hall. He saw limited action with the Yankees a September call-up in 1992 and in 30 games in 1993.

=== Japan (1994–1996) ===
In November 1993, the Yankees sold Meulens' contract to the Chiba Lotte Marines of Nippon Professional Baseball, where he spent the 1994 season, hitting 23 home runs, driving in 69 runs, while accumulating 135 strikeouts to go with a .248 AVG. The following season, Meulens signed with the Yakult Swallows, helping lead them to the 1995 Japan Series championship after hitting 29 home runs and totaling 80 RBI. He was back again in 1996, hitting 25 homers to go with 67 RBI.

=== Back to America (1997–2002) ===
He returned to North America in 1997, and after an unsuccessful tryout with the Atlanta Braves, he reached the majors again briefly playing with the Montreal Expos (while having a good season for the Expos' Triple-A affiliate Ottawa Lynx) in 1997 and Arizona Diamondbacks in 1998.

Unable to secure a contract with a major league team in 1999, Meulens signed with the Newark Bears of the independent Atlantic League. He made one last stop in Asia, playing 14 games with the SK Wyverns of the KBO League, batting only .196, before heading to the Mexican League with the Saraperos de Saltillo in 2001 and finally retiring in 2002 after a mid-season injury while playing with the Pericos de Puebla.

== International career ==
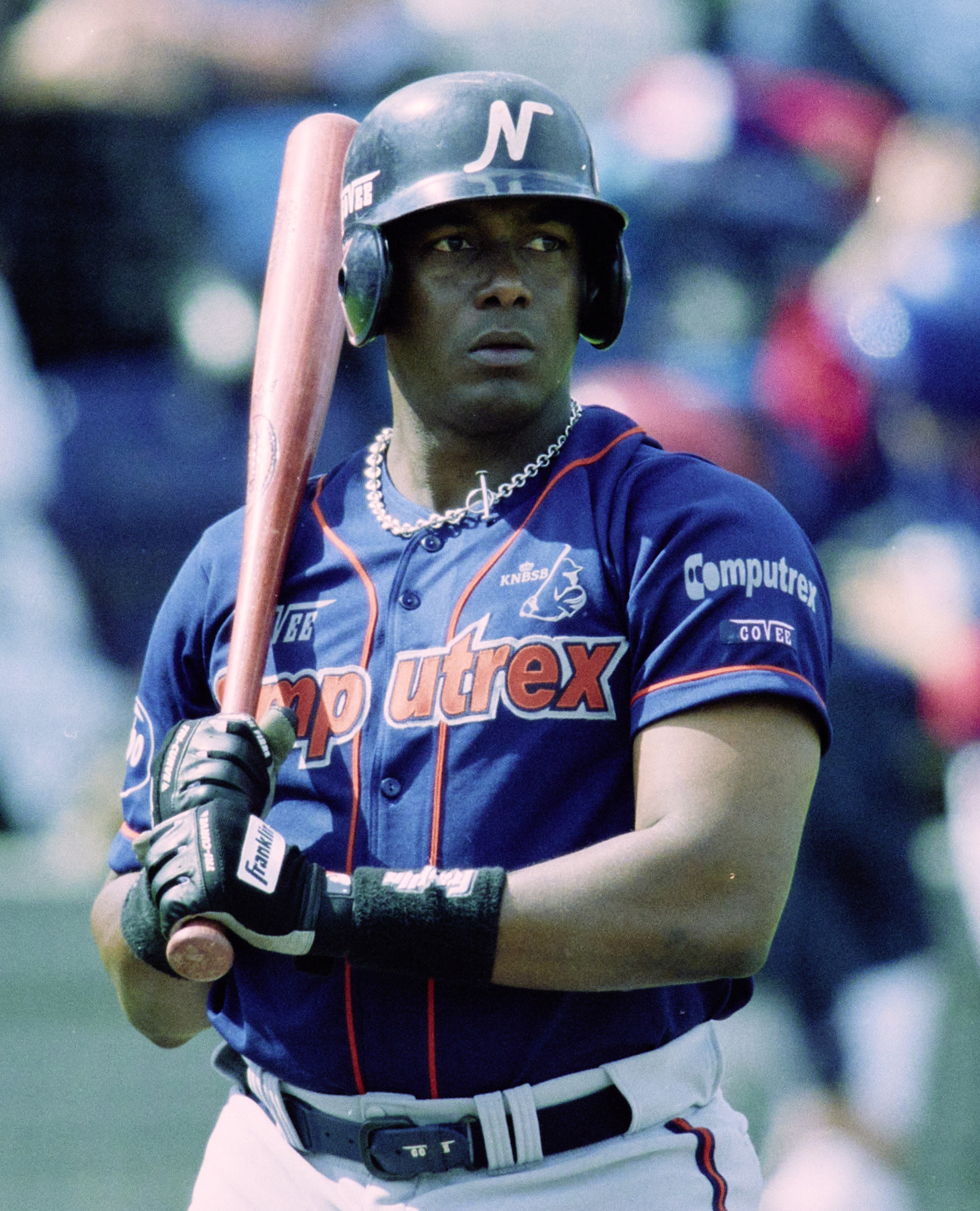
Meulens with the Netherlands in 2002

Meulens represented the Netherlands at the 2000 Summer Olympics in Sydney, Australia. His 4th-inning double gave Cuba their first Olympic loss in 21 games. Ultimately, the Netherlands took fifth place in the tournament.

Meulens also played for the Dutch team in the 2001 Baseball World Cup in Taichung, Taiwan and 2002 Intercontinental Cup in Havana, Cuba.

Meulens returned to the Netherlands national team as a coach for the 2004 Summer Olympics and 2009 World Baseball Classic (WBC). Meulens was named the manager of the team before the 2013 WBC. Meulens managed the Netherlands in the 2020 Olympic Baseball Qualifier, where the team failed to qualify to the Olympics. After a disappointing showing at the 2023 WBC, Meulens was dismissed as the Netherlands manager in December 2023.

== Coaching career ==
Meulens began his coaching career with the Bluefield Orioles for the 2003 and 2004 seasons. From 2005-2008, he was the hitting coach of the Indianapolis Indians, the Triple-A affiliate of the Pittsburgh Pirates, also coaching in the Arizona Fall League for the Peoria Saguaros in 2005 and the Hawaii Winter Baseball league for the Honolulu Sharks in the 2006 off-season. In 2009, Meulens served as hitting coach for the Fresno Grizzlies, the Triple-A affiliate of the San Francisco Giants of the Pacific Coast League.

Meulens also ran the Dutch Antilles Baseball Academy in Curaçao from 2003 to 2011. He was reportedly interested in starting a baseball league in Curaçao in association with MLB's RBI program.

=== San Francisco Giants (2010–2019) ===
Meulens reached the major league ranks as a hitting coach in 2010, joining the San Francisco Giants following the firing of Carney Lansford. He helped the Giants win a World Series in three of his first five years. In November 2017, Meulens became one of six candidates interviewed by the New York Yankees for their vacant manager position, following the decision not to renew the contract of Joe Girardi. The other candidates were Carlos Beltran, Aaron Boone, Rob Thomson, Eric Wedge and Chris Woodward. He was the Giants bench coach in 2018 and 2019.

=== New York Mets (2020) ===
Meulens was named bench coach of the New York Mets on December 8, 2019. He was fired after the season and replaced with Dave Jauss.

=== New York Yankees (2022) ===
On February 28, 2022, the New York Yankees announced that Meulens would serve as assistant hitting coach.

=== Colorado Rockies (2023–2025) ===
On November 7, 2022, the Colorado Rockies announced that they had hired Meulens as their hitting coach starting with the 2023 season. The Rockies fired him on April 17, 2025.

=== Leones de Yucatán ===
On May 18, 2026, Meulens was announced as the new manager of the Leones de Yucatán of the Mexican League, replacing Sergio Omar Gastélum.

== Personal life ==
Meulens is married and has five children, two of whom are from a previous marriage. He has two grandchildren.

Meulens speaks five languages: English, Spanish, Dutch, Papiamento, and Japanese.

On April 27, 2012, Meulens was awarded the order of Knight in the Order of Orange-Nassau by Queen Beatrix. A ceremony was held at AT&T Park on July 13, where he was introduced as 'Sir' Hensley Meulens. The award ceremony highlighted his role in victory by the Netherlands in the 2011 Baseball World Cup.

Meulens was inducted into the International League Hall of Fame in 2016.

In 2016, Meulens had a street in his hometown of Willemstad, Curaçao, Kaminda Hensley F.A. "Bam Bam" Meulens, named after him.

In April 2024, an investigation was launched by the Federal Aviation Administration for unauthorized entry to the cockpit of a United Airlines flight chartered by the Colorado Rockies en route to Toronto on April 10. Meulens had posted (and later deleted) a video on Instagram in which he was shown in a pilot's seat while the plane was on autopilot and included a caption thanking the captain and first officer. Meulens later issued an apology to the Rockies and United Airlines.
