= Shawn Hillegas =

American baseball player (born 1964)

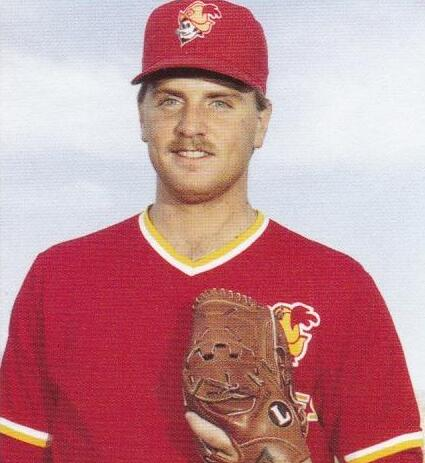
- Hillegas with the Albuquerque Dukes c. 1987
- Pitcher
- Born: August 21, 1964 (age 61); Dos Palos, California, U.S.
- Batted: Right Threw: Right

MLB debut
- August 9, 1987, for the Los Angeles Dodgers

Last MLB appearance
- July 17, 1993, for the Oakland Athletics

MLB statistics
- Win–loss record: 24–38
- Earned run average: 4.61
- Strikeouts: 332
- Stats at Baseball Reference

Teams
- Los Angeles Dodgers (1987–1988); Chicago White Sox (1988–1990); Cleveland Indians (1991); New York Yankees (1992); Oakland Athletics (1992–1993)

Shawn Patrick Hillegas (born August 21, 1964) is an American former professional baseball right-handed pitcher. He played for the Los Angeles Dodgers, Chicago White Sox, Cleveland Indians, New York Yankees and Oakland Athletics of Major League Baseball (MLB).

== Biography ==
Hillegas was born in Dos Palos, California, on August 21, 1964.

Hillegas was 6'3", 190 pounds (although one source says he was 6'2", 208 pounds) and he threw and batted right-handed. He attended Forest Hills High School in Sidman, Pennsylvania, and then Middle Georgia College.

== Career ==
Hillegas was drafted by the California Angels in the 26th round (657th overall) of the 1983 draft. He opted not to sign that year. In 1984, he signed with the Los Angeles Dodgers after being drafted 4th overall in the first round.

He did well in the minors, with only one bad stretch: in 1986 with the Albuquerque Dukes, he had a 6.17 ERA in 9 games. His best minor league season statistically was 1984 with the Vero Beach Dodgers, where he had a 1.83 ERA in 13 games.

On August 9, 1987, Hillegas made his major league debut. He lived up to his first round status in his debut-he pitched 8 2/3 innings with 6 strikeouts and 2 earned runs for the win. Perhaps his best Major League season was his rookie year-he went 4-3 with a 3.57 ERA in 58 innings pitched.

Hillegas went 24-38, with a 4.61 ERA. He never quite lived up to his 1st round status as a whole. As a batter, he went 2-29-that's a .069 batting average. He committed 9 errors in the field, for a .900 fielding percentage. He balked only once in his career.

He played his final game on July 17, 1993.

== Major transactions ==
- On August 30, 1988, Hillegas was traded to the White Sox from the Dodgers for Ricky Horton.
- On December 4, 1990, Hillegas was traded with Eric King from the White Sox to the Indians for Cory Snyder and minor leaguer Lindsay Foster.
