= Mike Humphreys =

American baseball player (born 1967)

- Outfielder
- Born: April 10, 1967 (age 59); Dallas, Texas, U.S.
- Batted: Right Threw: Right

MLB debut
- July 29, 1991, for the New York Yankees

Last MLB appearance
- October 3, 1993, for the New York Yankees

MLB statistics
- Batting average: .176
- Home runs: 1
- Runs batted in: 9
- Stats at Baseball Reference

Teams
- New York Yankees (1991–1993)

Michael Butler Humphreys (born April 10, 1967) is an American former Major League Baseball player. Humphreys played for the New York Yankees from 1991 to 1993. He batted and threw right-handed.

== Amateur career ==
Humphreys played collegiately for the Texas Tech Red Raiders. In 1987, he played collegiate summer baseball with the Orleans Cardinals of the Cape Cod Baseball League and was named a league all-star.

== Professional career ==
He was drafted by the San Diego Padres in the 15th round of the 1988 MLB draft. He then went on to play for the New York Yankees.

== Personal ==
His son, Zack, was a catcher for the TCU Horned Frogs.

He was signed as a free agent on 7/13/2021 by the Los Angeles Angels. He currently plays for the Rocket City Trash Pandas (AA-level minor league team for the Angels) in Madison, Alabama.
