= Patrick Lennon (baseball) =

American baseball player (born 1968)

- Outfielder
- Born: April 27, 1968 (age 58); Whiteville, North Carolina, U.S.
- Batted: Right Threw: Right

MLB debut
- September 15, 1991, for the Seattle Mariners

Last MLB appearance
- June 1, 1999, for the Toronto Blue Jays

MLB statistics
- Batting average: .265
- Home runs: 2
- Runs batted in: 22
- Stats at Baseball Reference

Teams
- Seattle Mariners (1991–1992); Kansas City Royals (1996); Oakland Athletics (1997); Toronto Blue Jays (1998–1999)

Patrick Orlando Lennon (born April 27, 1968) is an American former professional baseball outfielder. He played in Major League Baseball (MLB) for the Seattle Mariners, Kansas City Royals, Oakland Athletics, and Toronto Blue Jays.

Lennon was drafted by the Seattle Mariners in the first round with the eighth overall selection of the 1986 MLB draft out of Whiteville High School in Whiteville, North Carolina. He signed with the Mariners for $120,000. That fall, he was charged with assault in Whiteville for allegedly striking someone with a gun. While playing in Double-A in 1989, Lennon fired a gun in a parking lot and was charged with attempted murder and other offenses. He was held in a Pennsylvania county jail for two months.

Lennon made his major league debut for the Mariners on September 15, 1991. The Mariners released him after the 1992 season, then he was cut by the Colorado Rockies in spring training in 1993. He had the most MLB playing time in 1997 with the Athletics, batting .293 with one home run in 56 games.

Lennon played in the Mexican Baseball League in 1993 and 1997. From 2002–2005, with two stints in Triple-A in between, he played for the Long Island Ducks of the independent Atlantic League. In his four seasons with the Ducks, he batted .311, .327, .323, and .291.
