= Calvin Jones (baseball) =

American baseball player (1963–2022)

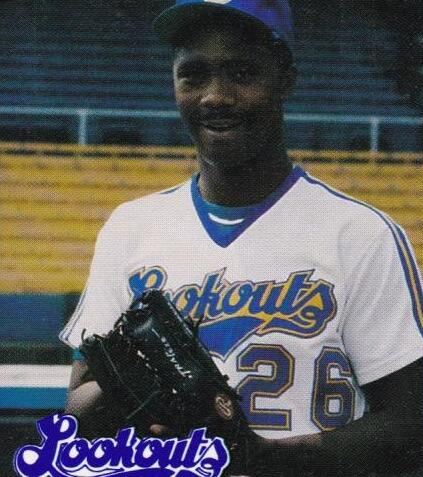
- Jones with the Chattanooga Lookouts c. 1987
- Pitcher
- Born: September 26, 1963; Compton, California, U.S.
- Died: February 12, 2022 (aged 58); Dallas, Texas, U.S.
- Batted: Right Threw: Right

MLB debut
- June 14, 1991, for the Seattle Mariners

Last MLB appearance
- October 1, 1992, for the Seattle Mariners

MLB statistics
- Win–loss record: 5–7
- Earned run average: 4.33
- Strikeouts: 91
- Stats at Baseball Reference

Teams
- Seattle Mariners (1991–1992)

Calvin Douglas Jones (September 26, 1963 – February 12, 2022) was an American professional baseball pitcher. He played during two seasons in Major League Baseball (MLB) for the Seattle Mariners. He later worked as a scout.

== Career ==
Jones attended Chaffey Junior College and University of California, Riverside, where he played college baseball for the Highlanders from 1982–1983.

Jones was drafted by the Mariners as the 1st pick in the first round of the January 1984 MLB draft. He played his first professional season with their Class A Short Season Bellingham Mariners in 1984 and his last season with the Los Angeles Dodgers' Triple-A Albuquerque Dukes in 1996.

Jones led the Salinas Spurs in strikeouts in 1986. He converted to a relief pitcher role in 1987, then missed most of 1989 with a back injury. He made his MLB debut in 1991, going 2–2 with the Mariners. He lost his only start with the Mariners, in June 1992, his final MLB season. The Colorado Rockies selected Jones in the 1992 MLB expansion draft, but he did not return to the majors.

Jones later pitched in 1996, 1998, and 1999 in the Chinese Professional Baseball League in Taiwan, the Mexican Baseball League in 2000, and the Atlantic League in 2001 and 2002.

After ending his career, Jones became a scout with the Los Angeles Dodgers, working in Texas. He was instrumental in the team drafting and signing future Cy Young Award winner Clayton Kershaw.

== Personal life and death ==
Jones died from cancer on February 12, 2022, at the age of 58.
