= Jeff Johnson (baseball) =

American baseball player (born 1966)

- Pitcher
- Born: August 4, 1966 (age 60); Durham, North Carolina, U.S.
- Batted: Right Threw: Left

MLB debut
- June 5, 1991, for the New York Yankees

Last MLB appearance
- June 12, 1993, for the New York Yankees

MLB statistics
- Win–loss record: 8–16
- Earned run average: 6.52
- Strikeouts: 76
- Stats at Baseball Reference

Teams
- New York Yankees (1991–1993)

William Jeffrey Johnson (born August 4, 1966) is a former Major League Baseball pitcher. He played with the New York Yankees for his entire Major League career. Born in Durham, North Carolina, Johnson attended South Granville High School, then University of North Carolina at Charlotte where he played college baseball. He was only one of nine people from the University of North Carolina at Charlotte to have played Major League Baseball. On June 1, 1988, Johnson was drafted by the New York Yankees in the 6th round (157th overall pick) of the 1988 amateur draft. He was listed at 6 ft 3 in (1.91 m) in height, and 200 lb. in weight. During his three-year Major League Baseball career, Johnson batted right-handed and threw left-handed.

== Major League Baseball career ==
Jeff Johnson made his major league debut on June 5, 1991 at age 24 with the New York Yankees. On that day, the Toronto Blue Jays were playing against the Yankees at Yankee Stadium, with 21,213 people attending the game. Johnson was the starting pitcher for the game. He pitched until the seventh inning, then he was replaced by Eric Plunk. Plunk finished the game. Unfortunately, at the end of the game, the New York Yankees lost to the Toronto Blue Jays 4–1.

The New York Times published an article on March 20, 1992, mentioning that Johnson had been bothered by rumors he had heard about the New York Yankees pursuing different pitchers. Johnson played his final major league baseball game on June 12, 1993. On September 17, 1993, Johnson was released by the New York Yankees. He then signed as a free agent with the Cleveland Indians on February 14, 1994, though he never pitched for them. At the end of his career, Johnson had pitched a total of 182.1 innings. He also earned a career earned run average (ERA) of 6.52, with 8 wins and 16 losses, along with 76 strikeouts.
