= Steve Farr =

American baseball player (born 1956)

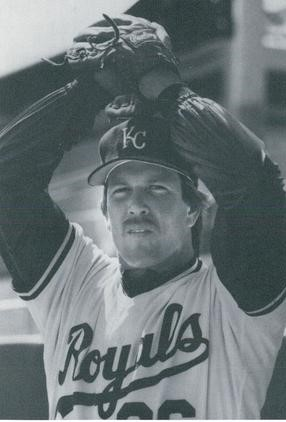
- Pitcher
- Born: December 12, 1956 (age 69); Cheverly, Maryland, U.S.
- Batted: Right Threw: Right

MLB debut
- May 1, 1984, for the Cleveland Indians

Last MLB appearance
- August 8, 1994, for the Boston Red Sox

MLB statistics
- Win–loss record: 48–45
- Earned run average: 3.25
- Strikeouts: 668
- Saves: 132
- Stats at Baseball Reference

Teams
- Cleveland Indians (1984); Kansas City Royals (1985–1990); New York Yankees (1991–1993); Cleveland Indians (1994); Boston Red Sox (1994)

Career highlights and awards
- World Series champion (1985)

Steven Michael Farr (born December 12, 1956) is an American former professional baseball player who pitched primarily as a closer in Major League Baseball (MLB) from 1984 to 1994.

== Biography ==
Farr graduated from DeMatha High School outside Washington, D.C., in 1974 where he played both pitcher and catcher and then played college baseball at American University for a year before signing a professional contract with the Pittsburgh Pirates.

He was signed as an undrafted free Agent by the Pittsburgh Pirates in '76 and spent 7 full seasons in their farm system. On June 8th 1983 he was traded by the Pirates to the Cleveland Indians for John Malkin. he began his professional career in Cleveland in 1984 as a reliever. He pitched 116 innings over the course of 31 games. And was ultimately released by the club.

On May 9, 1985 Farr was picked up by the Royals as a bullpen reliever, although he would not play a part in the team's World Series Championship that year, he was credited as the winning pitcher of game 3 of the ALCS against Toronto having put up 4.1 innings of work. However, after a few seasons he took over as the Royals closer in the 1988 season leading the team in saves with 20. In 89 he injured his knee and required surgery, but still chalked up 18 saves for the team.

In 1990 he was used anywhere between the pitching rotations and bullpen the team needed him and he ended up leading the team with 13 wins while posting a 1.98 ERA. It was this season that he pitched his only career complete game throwing a 5 hit shutout of the California Angels on September 23, 1990. This season's performance led to him signing with the New York Yankees just before the '91 season. In his first season he led the team in saves with 23 while at one point posting 27 consecutive scoreless innings and 14 straight save completions. He went on in '92 to post a career high 30 saves while putting up a 1.56 ERA.

After earning 25 saves in 93 to lead the Yankees for 3 straight seasons, in 1994 with the ascension of Mariano Rivera to the position of the team's closer, Farr signed as a free agent with the Cleveland Indians taking over their closer duties. But at the beginning of July he was traded to the Boston Red Sox only to have that be his last season to pitch in the majors.

Farr was known throughout his career for his impeccable control and a basic repertoire of fastball, curveball and slider.

== See also ==
- Buffalo Baseball Hall of Fame
