= John Habyan =

American baseball player (born 1964)

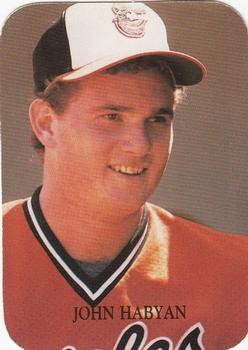
- Pitcher
- Born: January 29, 1964 (age 62); Bay Shore, New York, U.S.
- Batted: Right Threw: Right

MLB debut
- September 29, 1985, for the Baltimore Orioles

Last MLB appearance
- June 8, 1996, for the Colorado Rockies

MLB statistics
- Win–loss record: 26–24
- Earned run average: 3.85
- Strikeouts: 372
- Stats at Baseball Reference

Teams
- Baltimore Orioles (1985–1988); New York Yankees (1990–1993); Kansas City Royals (1993); St. Louis Cardinals (1994–1995); California Angels (1995); Colorado Rockies (1996)

John Gabriel Habyan (born January 29, 1964) is a former professional baseball player. A right-handed pitcher, Habyan played all or parts of 11 seasons in Major League Baseball.

== Baseball career ==
Drafted by the Baltimore Orioles in the 3rd round of the 1982 Major League Baseball draft, Habyan made his MLB debut with the Baltimore Orioles on September 29, 1985. From 1990 to 1993 he pitched for the New York Yankees, over that span going 11-9, 10 saves, an ERA of 3.16, and striking out 147. During the 1993 he was traded to the Kansas City Royals. He pitched for three more teams, before appearing in his final game on June 8, 1996.

Defensively, he was a good fielding pitcher, posting a .992 fielding percentage, committing only one error in 121 total chances in 532.1 innings of work.

== Coaching career ==
Habyan coached the varsity team and taught gym classes at St. John the Baptist Diocesan High School in West Islip, New York. In 2008 the Cougars won the NSCHSAA championship against St. Dominic High School in a best of 3 series, 2–1.

In 2015, Habyan became the pitching coach at Hofstra University, in Hempstead, New York, an NCAA Division I baseball program on Long Island, under head baseball coach John Russo.

Hayban is also the pitching coach for the New York Baseball Academy, which is held at Hofstra.

== Hall of fame inductee ==
Habyan was inducted into the Suffolk Sports Hall of Fame on Long Island in the Baseball Category with the Class of 2005.
