= Dave Fleming (baseball) =

American baseball player (born 1969)

- Pitcher
- Born: November 7, 1969 (age 56); Jackson Heights, New York, U.S.
- Batted: Left Threw: Left

MLB debut
- August 6, 1991, for the Seattle Mariners

Last MLB appearance
- September 30, 1995, for the Kansas City Royals

MLB statistics
- Win–loss record: 38–32
- Earned run average: 4.67
- Strikeouts: 303
- Stats at Baseball Reference

Teams
- Seattle Mariners (1991–1995); Kansas City Royals (1995)

David Anthony Fleming (born November 7, 1969) is an American former professional baseball pitcher who played from 1991 to 1995, mostly for the Seattle Mariners of Major League Baseball (MLB).

== Career ==
Fleming was born in Jackson Heights, Queens, New York, and went to high school in Mahopac. He pitched for the University of Georgia, leading them to a College World Series title in 1990.

Fleming was selected in the third round of the 1990 Major League Baseball draft by the Seattle Mariners. He won a career high 17 games, including nine consecutive, for the Mariners in his rookie season of 1992. His ERA that year was 3.39, and he took third place in the AL Rookie of the Year voting (behind winner Pat Listach).

After going 29-15 in his first two MLB seasons, Fleming began to struggle with arm trouble. On 7 July 1995, he was traded by the Mariners to the Kansas City Royals for Bob Milacki. He pitched only nine games for the Royals before undergoing surgery, and never pitched in the Major Leagues again.

Fleming is currently a fifth-grade teacher at Chatfield-LoPresti School in Seymour, Connecticut.
