= Mike Schooler =

American baseball player (born 1962)

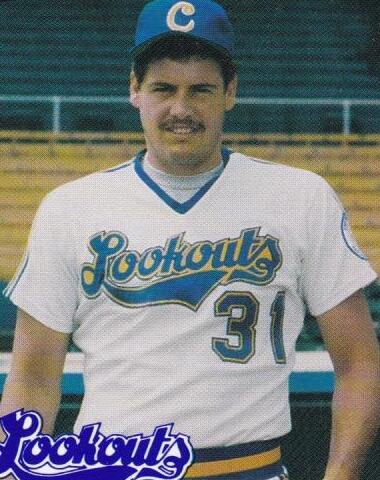
- Schooler with the Chattanooga Lookouts c. 1987
- Pitcher
- Born: August 10, 1962 (age 63); Anaheim, California, U.S.
- Batted: Right Threw: Right

MLB debut
- June 10, 1988, for the Seattle Mariners

Last MLB appearance
- September 3, 1993, for the Texas Rangers

Career statistics
- Win–loss record: 15–29
- Earned run average: 3.49
- Strikeouts: 248
- Saves: 98
- Stats at Baseball Reference

Teams
- Seattle Mariners (1988–1992); Texas Rangers (1993)

Michael Ralph Schooler (born August 10, 1962) is an American former professional baseball player. Schooler pitched in Major League Baseball (MLB) from 1988–1993 for the Seattle Mariners and the Texas Rangers. He attended Garden Grove High School in Garden Grove, California, Golden West College, and Cal State Fullerton.

== Professional career ==
=== Seattle Mariners ===
The Seattle Mariners selected Schooler in the second round, 35th overall, in the 1985 MLB draft. He worked as a starter to begin his minor league career, leading his teams in wins, starts, and strikeouts in 1986 and 1987. He converted to a relief role with Caracas of the Venezuelan Winter League after the 1987 season, then pitched in relief in Triple-A at the beginning of 1988.

Schooler made his MLB debut on June 10, 1988, against the Minnesota Twins, pitching one scoreless inning. He became Seattle's closer in the second half of 1988, saving 15 games and striking out more than a batter an inning. He surpassed that performance in 1989, his first full season, improving his control and finishing third in the American League in saves, trailing only Jeff Russell and Bobby Thigpen. He ended up posting 30 saves in 1990, good for eighth in the league. However, he missed the final month of the season with a shoulder injury. He returned to the Mariners in July 1991. He finished third on the team with 7 saves in a partial season. In 1992, he allowed seven home runs, all of which tied the game or put the opposition in the lead. Four of the home runs were grand slams, which tied an MLB record for most allowed in a season. He suffered two losses and four blown saves when surrendering a homer, with the Mariners winning only one of those seven games. He a 4.70 ERA, the highest of his career. The Mariners released Schooler on March 15, 1993. He was the franchise leader in saves, with 98. His shoulder injury limited his effectiveness in his final seasons with Seattle.

=== Later career ===
On March 22, 1993, Schooler signed with the Texas Rangers. He debuted with Texas in June and went 3–0 with a 5.55 ERA in 17 games. He was released on September 11.

Schooler pitched in Double-A in both 1994 and 1995. He was a replacement player with the California Angels in spring training in 1995 during the ongoing players' strike.
