= List of New York Yankees coaches =

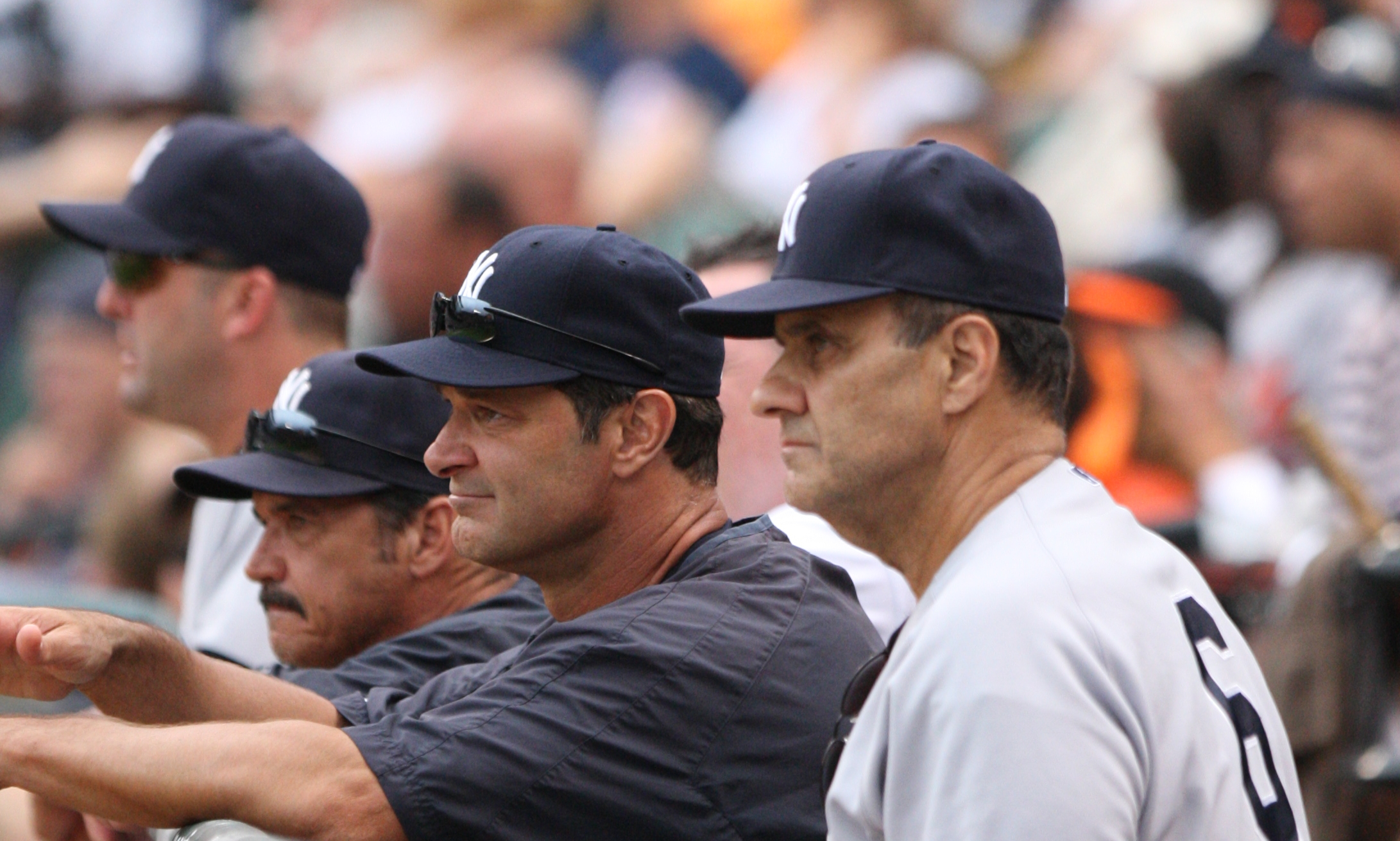
Joe Torre (at right) with coaches (from left) Kevin Long, Ron Guidry, and Don Mattingly

The New York Yankees are a professional baseball team based in New York City, New York in the borough of The Bronx. The Yankees are members of the American League (AL) East Division in Major League Baseball (MLB). The Yankees have won the World Series 27 times, more than any other MLB team.

In baseball, coaches serve as assistants to the manager. In the past, coaches did not serve in specific roles, as noted in the position titles, such as "first assistant." The number of coaches on a team's staff has increased over the years, and coaching evolved so that individual coaches took on specific roles. Base coaches also serve as infield, outfield, and base-running instructors. Teams also have a pitching coach, hitting coach, and bullpen coach, who often works with the catchers. The bench coach, a newer role on the coaching staff, serves as a second-in-command, advising the manager during the game.

Many Yankees coaches are former players, former managers or future managers.

== Coaches ==
Key
†	Inducted into the Baseball Hall of Fame primarily as a manager or executive
*	Inducted into the Baseball Hall of Fame primarily as a player
+	Former MLB All-Star

=== Bench coaches ===
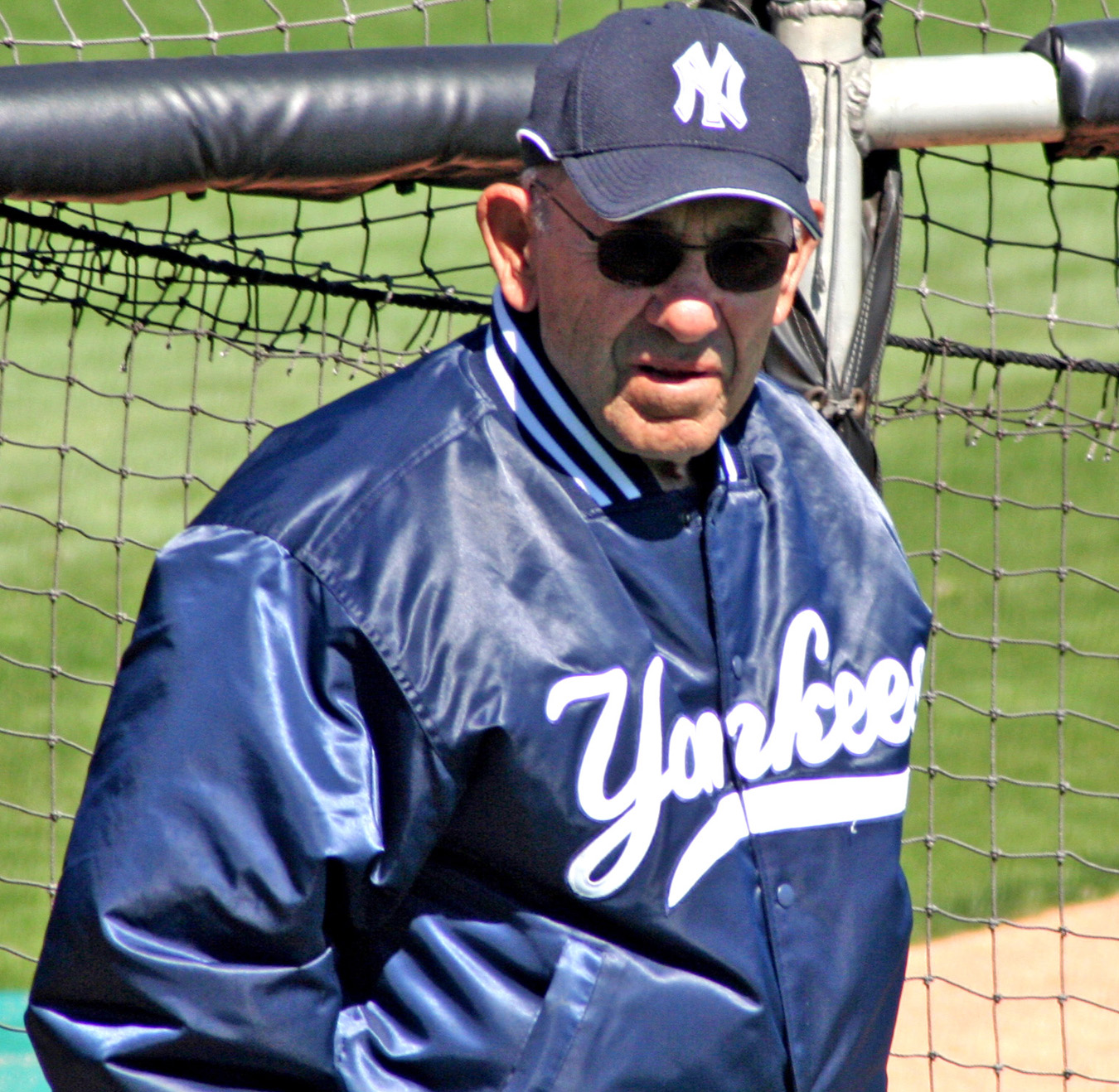
Yogi Berra served as a coach for the Yankees after his playing and managerial career.

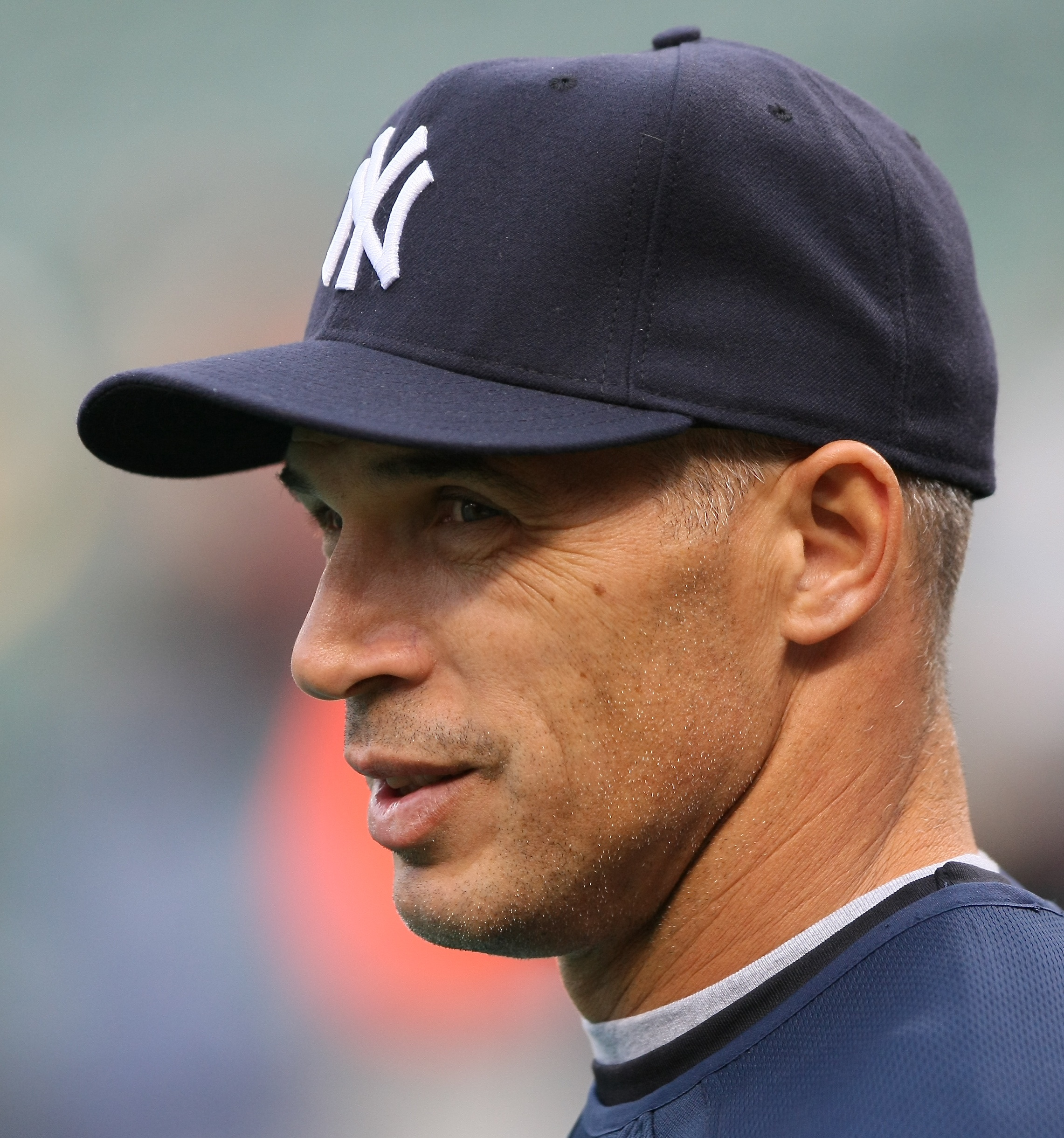
Joe Girardi served as bench coach for one season, before becoming the manager for the Florida Marlins, and later for the New York Yankees.

Coach	Seasons	Notes	Ref
Yogi Berra^{*}	1976–1982	Former Yankees catcher/outfielder (1946–1963); Managed the Yankees (1964, 1984–1985) and New York Mets (1972–1975)	
Roy White^{+}	1983	Former Yankees outfielder (1965–1979)	
Joe Altobelli	1986	Managed the San Francisco Giants (1977–1979), Baltimore Orioles (1983–1985), Chicago Cubs (1991)	
Charlie Fox	1989	Managed the San Francisco Giants (1971–1974), Montreal Expos (1976), and Chicago Cubs (1983)	
Mike Ferraro	1991	Managed the Cleveland Indians (1983) and Kansas City Royals (1986)	
Russ Meyer	1992	—	
Ed Napoleon	1993	—	
Clete Boyer	1994	Former Yankees third baseman (1957–1966)	
Don Zimmer^{+}	1996–2003	Managed the San Diego Padres (1972–1973), Boston Red Sox (1976–1980), Texas Rangers (1981–1982), and Chicago Cubs (1988–1991)	
Willie Randolph^{+}	2004	Former Yankees second baseman (1976–1988); Managed the New York Mets (2005–08)	
Joe Girardi^{+}	2005	Former Yankees catcher (1996–1999); Managed the Florida Marlins (2006) and New York Yankees (2008–2017)	and the Philadelphia Phillies (2020–2022)
Lee Mazzilli^{+}	2006	Former Yankees first baseman (1982); Managed the Baltimore Orioles (2004–2005)	
Don Mattingly^{+}	2007	Former Yankees first baseman (1982–1995); Managed the Los Angeles Dodgers (2011–2015) and the Miami Marlins (2016–2022); Philadelphia Phillies (2026–present) Bench Coach the Toronto Blue Jays (2023–2025); Philadelphia Phillies (2026)	
Rob Thomson	2008, 2015–2017	Bench Coach the New York Yankees (2008, 2015–2017) and the Philadelphia Phillies (2018–2022); Third Base Coach the New York Yankees (2009–2014); Managed the Philadelphia Phillies (2022–2026)	
Tony Peña^{+}	2009–2014	Managed the Kansas City Royals (2002–2005) Bench Coach the New York Yankees (2009–2014); First Base Coach the New York Yankees (2006–2008, 2015–2017)	
Josh Bard	2018–2019	bullpen coach the Los Angeles Dodgers (2016–2017, 2020–present)	
Carlos Mendoza	2020–2023	Bench Coach the New York Yankees (2018–2023) ; Third base the Philadelphia Phillies (2027–present) ;Managed the New York Mets (2024–2026)	
Brad Ausmus ^{+}	2024–2026	Bench Coach the Oakland Athletics (2022) and the New York Yankees (2024–2026); Managed the Detroit Tigers (2014–2017) and the Los Angeles Angels (2019); Houston Astros (2027–present)	

=== Pitching coaches ===
Coach	Seasons	Notes	Ref
John Corriden	1947–1948	—	
Jim Turner	1949–1959; 1966–1973	Former Yankees pitcher (1942–1945)	
Eddie Lopat^{+}	1960	Former Yankees pitcher (1948–1955); Managed the Kansas City Athletics (1963–1964)	
Johnny Sain^{+}	1961–1963	Former Yankees pitcher (1951–1955)	
Whitey Ford^{*}	1964, 1974–1975	Former Yankees pitcher (1950–1967)	
Cot Deal	1965	—	
Cloyd Boyer	1975, 1977	—	
Bob Lemon^{*}	1976	Managed the Kansas City Royals (1970–1972), Chicago White Sox (1977–1978), New York Yankees (1978–1979, 1981–1982)	
Art Fowler	1977–1979; 1983, 1988	—	
Clyde King	1978, 1981–1982	Managed the San Francisco Giants (1969–1970), Atlanta Braves (1974–1975), Yankees (1982)	
Tom Morgan	1979	Former Yankees pitcher (1951–1956)	
Stan Williams	1980–1982, 1988	Former Yankees pitcher (1963–1964)	
Jeff Torborg	1982–1984	Began the 1982 season as co-pitching coach with Jerry Walker. Managed the Cleveland Indians (1977–1979), Chicago White Sox (1989–1991), New York Mets (1992–1993), Montreal Expos (2001), and Florida Marlins (2002–2003)	
Jerry Walker^{+}	1982	Began the 1982 season as co-pitching coach with Jeff Torborg.	
Sammy Ellis^{+}	1982–1984, 1986	Served as co-pitching coach with Jeff Torborg (1983–1984).	
Mark Connor	1984–1987; 1991–1992	—	
Bill Monbouquette	1985	Former Yankees pitcher (1967–1968)	
Billy Connors	1989–1990; 1994–1995, 2000	Served as interim pitching coach while Stottlemyre was ill (2000).	
Tony Cloninger	1992–1993	—	
Nardi Contreras	1995	—	
Mel Stottlemyre^{+}	1996–2005	Former Yankees pitcher (1964–1974)	
Ron Guidry^{+}	2006–2007	Former Yankees pitcher (1975–88)	
Dave Eiland	2008–2010	Former Yankees pitcher (1988–1991, 1995)	
Larry Rothschild	2011–2019	Managed the Tampa Bay Devil Rays (1998–2001)	
Matt Blake	2020–present		

=== Hitting coaches ===
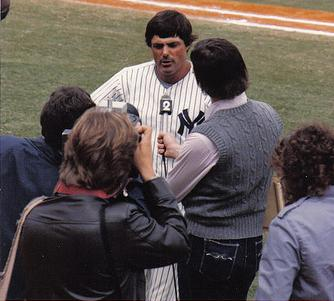
Lou Piniella was a Yankees player, coach, manager, general manager, and managed other teams as well.

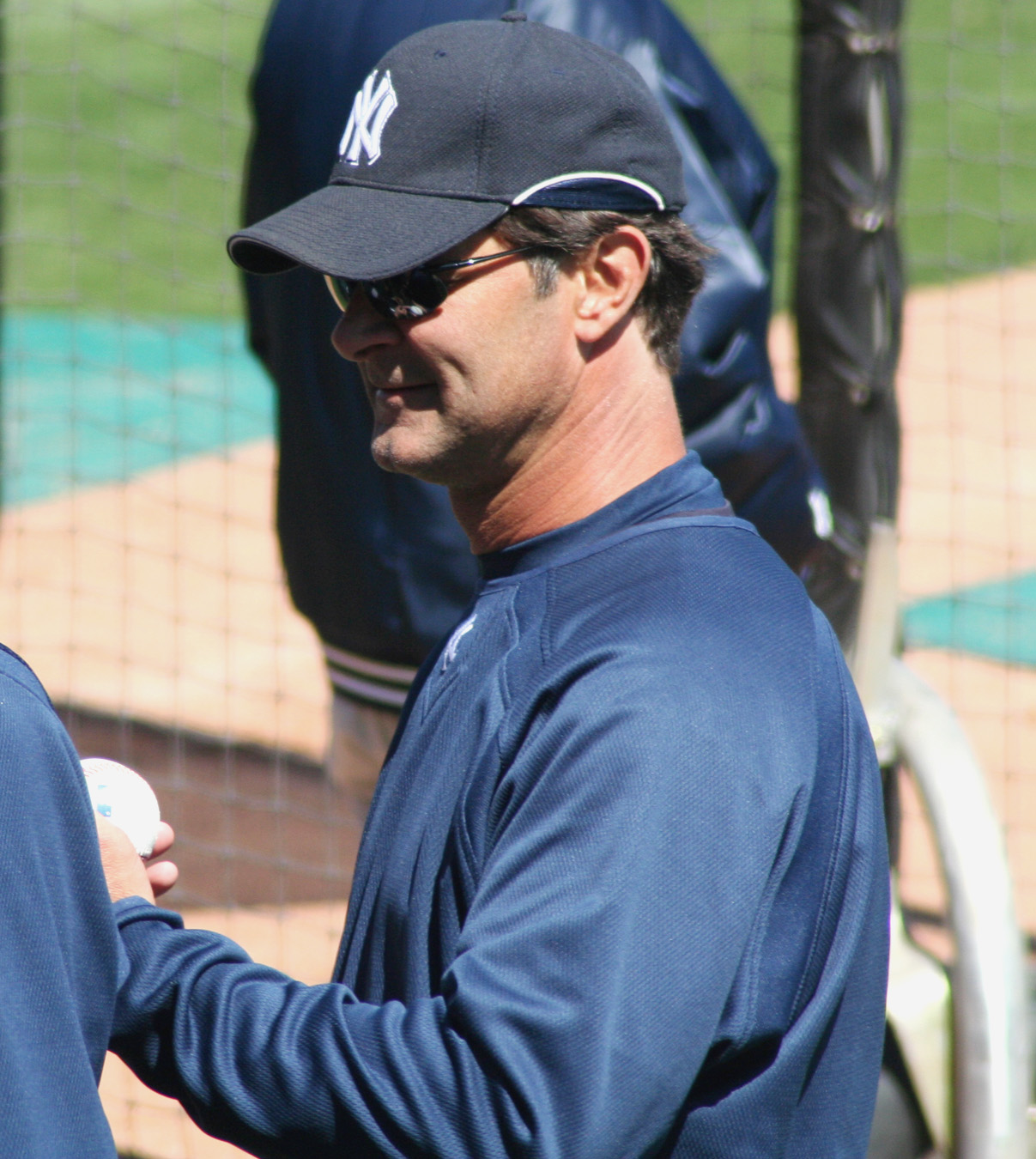
Don Mattingly served as a hitting coach and bench coach for the Yankees following his playing career.

Coach	Seasons	Notes	Ref
Ralph Houk	1958–1960	Former Yankees catcher (1947–1954); Managed the New York Yankees (1961–1963, 1966–1973), Detroit Tigers (1974–1978), and Boston Red Sox (1981–1984)	
Wally Moses	1961–1962	—	
Mickey Mantle^{*}	1970	Former Yankees outfielder/first baseman (1951–1968)	
Charley Lau	1979–1981	—	
Mickey Vernon^{+}	1982	—	
Joe Pepitone^{+}	1982	Former Yankees first baseman/outfielder (1962–1969)	
Lee Walls	1983	—	
Lou Piniella^{+}	1984–1985	Former Yankees outfielder (1974–1984); Managed the Yankees (1986–1987, 1988), Cincinnati Reds (1990–1992), Seattle Mariners (1993–2002), Tampa Bay Devil Rays (2003–2005) and Chicago Cubs (2007–2010)	
Willie Horton^{+}	1985	—	
Jay Ward	1987	—	
Chris Chambliss^{+}	1988, 1996–2000	Former Yankees first baseman (1974–1979, 1988)	
Champ Summers	1989–1990	—	
Darrell Evans^{+}	1990	—	
Frank Howard^{+}	1991–1992	Managed the San Diego Padres (1981) and New York Mets (1983)	
Rick Down	1993–1995; 2002–2003	—	
Gary Denbo	2001	—	
Don Mattingly^{+}	2004–2006	Former Yankees first baseman (1982–1995); Managed the Los Angeles Dodgers (2011–2015) and the Miami Marlins (2016–2022); Philadelphia Phillies (2026–present) Bench Coach the Toronto Blue Jays (2023–2025); Philadelphia Phillies (2026)	
Kevin Long	2007–2014	Former Hitting coach New York Yankees (2007–2014), New York Mets (2015–2017), Washington Nationals (2018–2021), Philadelphia Phillies (2022–2026)	
Jeff Pentland	2015	Former Hitting coach Chicago Cubs (1997–2002), Kansas City Royals (2003–2005), Seattle Mariners (2005–2008), and Los Angeles Dodgers (2011), New York Yankees (2015).	
Alan Cockrell	2016–2017	Former Hitting coach Colorado Rockies (2006–2008), Seattle Mariners (2009–2011), New York Yankees (2016–2017)	
Marcus Thames	2018–2021	Former Yankees outfielder (2002, 2010); Hitting Coach the New York Yankees (2018–2021); Miami Marlins (2022); Los Angeles Angels (2023); Chicago White Sox (2024–present)	
Dillon Lawson	2022–2023	Former hitting Coach for the New York Yankees	
Sean Casey	2023	Former hitting coach for the New York Yankees	
Hensley Meulens	2022	Former Yankees outfielder (1989–1993), Assistant hitting coach New York Yankees (2022); Former bench coach San Francisco Giants (2010–2017); New York Mets (2020) hitting coach San Francisco Giants (2018–2019); Colorado Rockies (2023–2025)	
James Rowson	2024–2026	hitting coach for the Chicago Cubs (2012–2013);Minnesota Twins (2017–2019), Miami Marlins (2020–2022), Detroit Tigers (2023), New York Yankees (2024–2026)	

=== Bullpen coaches ===
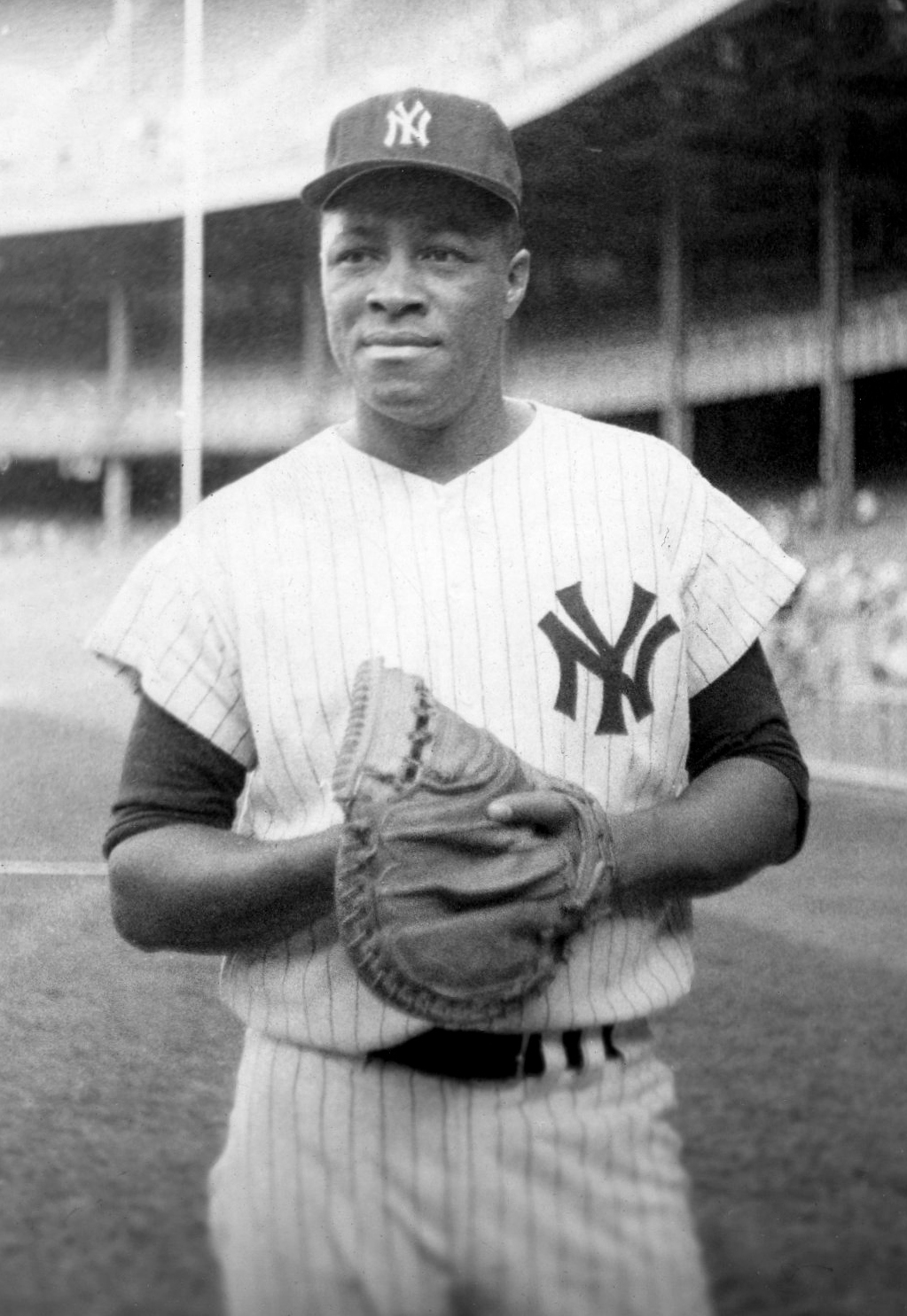
Elston Howard, the first African-American Yankee, hoped to become the first African-American manager in Major League Baseball, and coached the Yankees hoping he would receive a managerial offer.

Coach	Seasons	Notes	Ref
Jim Hegan^{+}	1961–1973; 1979–1980	—	
Mel Wright	1974–1975	—	
Elston Howard^{*}	1978–1979	Former Yankees catcher (1955–1967)	
Jeff Torborg	1980–1984; 1985–1987, 1988	Managed the Cleveland Indians (1977–1979), Chicago White Sox (1989–1991), New York Mets (1992–1993), Montreal Expos (2001), and Florida Marlins (2002–2003)	
Jerry McNertney	1984	—	
Mark Connor	1984–1985; 1990, 1993	—	
George Mitterwald	1988	—	
John Stearns	1989	—	
Marc Hill	1991	—	
Tony Cloninger	1992, 1994–2001	—	
Rich Monteleone	2002–2004	Former Yankees pitcher (1990–1993)	
Neil Allen	2005	Former Yankees pitcher (1985, 1987–1988)	
Joe Kerrigan	2006–2007	Managed the Boston Red Sox (2001)	
Mike Harkey	2008–2013; 2016–2025	Pitching coach for the Arizona Diamondbacks (2014–2015)	
Gary Tuck	2014–2015	—	

=== First base coaches ===
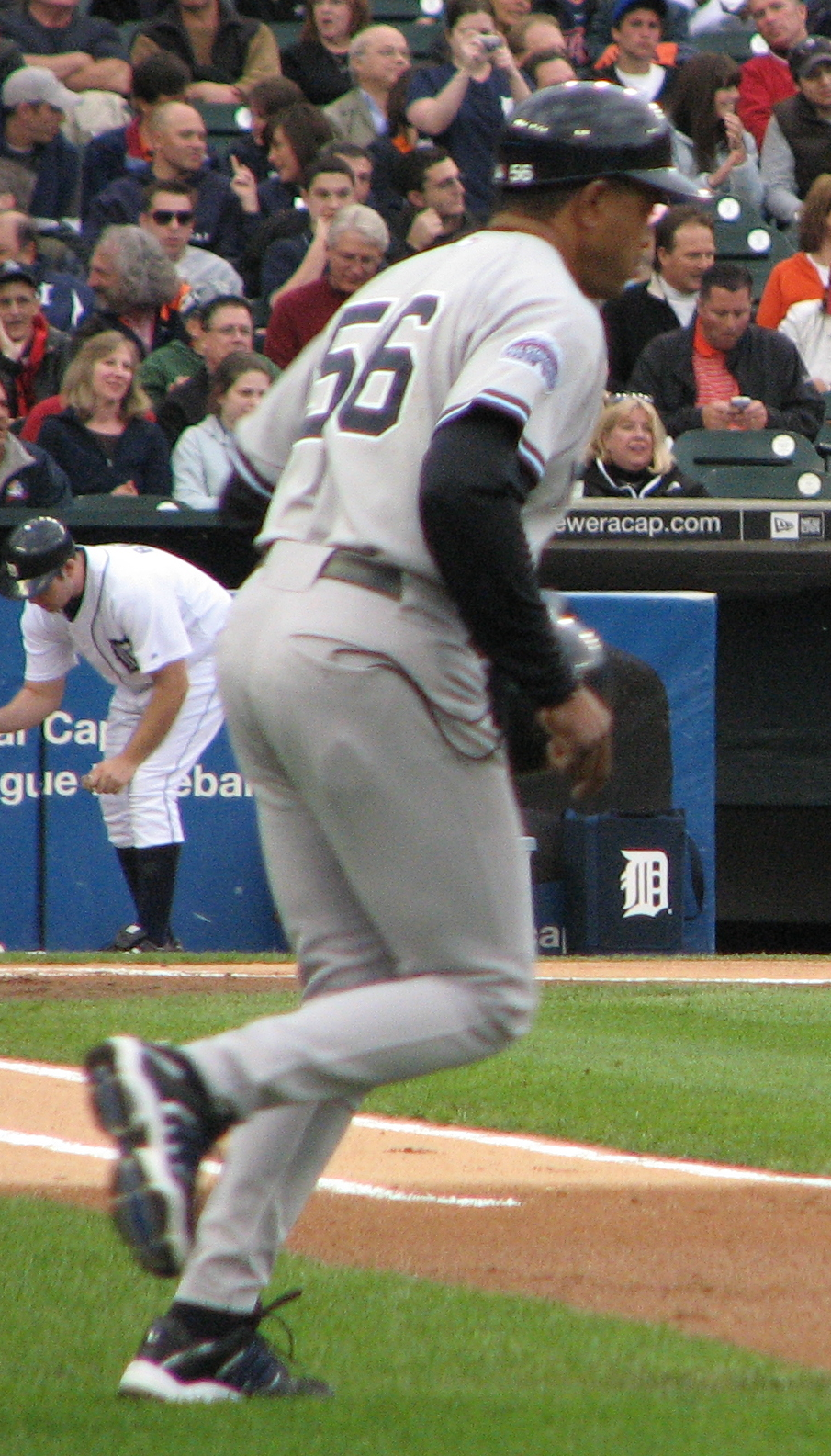
Tony Peña, the former Manager of the Year for the Kansas City Royals, has served as first base coach and bench coach for the Yankees.

Coach	Seasons	Notes	Ref
Ralph Houk	1958–1960	Former Yankees catcher (1947–1954); Managed the New York Yankees (1961–1963, 1966–1973), Detroit Tigers (1974–1978), and Boston Red Sox (1981–1984)	
Charlie Keller^{+}	1959	Former Yankees outfielder (1939–1949, 1952)	
Wally Moses	1961–1962, 1966	—	
Yogi Berra^{*}	1963, 1979, 1983	Former Yankees catcher/outfielder (1946–1963); Managed the Yankees (1964, 1984–1985) and New York Mets (1972–1975)	
Jim Gleeson	1964	—	
Vern Benson	1965–1966	—	
Loren Babe	1967	Former Yankees third baseman (1952–1953)	
Whitey Ford^{*}	1968	Former Yankees pitcher (1950–1967)	
Elston Howard^{*}	1969–1977	Former Yankees catcher (1955–1967)	
Mickey Mantle	1970	Former Yankees outfielder/first baseman (1951–68);	
Bobby Cox	1977	Former Yankees third baseman (1968–1969); Managed the Atlanta Braves (1978–1981), Toronto Blue Jays (1982–1985) and Atlanta Braves (1990–2010)	
Gene Michael	1978	Former Yankees shortstop (1968–1974); Managed the Yankees (1981–1982) and Chicago Cubs (1986–1987)	
Mike Ferraro	1979–1980; 1981–1982; 1988, 1990	Managed the Cleveland Indians (1983) and Kansas City Royals (1986)	
Jeff Torborg	1980	Managed the Cleveland Indians (1977–1979), Chicago White Sox (1989–1991), New York Mets (1992–1993), Montreal Expos (2001), and Florida Marlins (2002–2003)	
Roy White^{+}	1984, 1986; 2004–2005	Former Yankees outfielder (1965–1979)	
Doug Holmquist	1984–1985	—	
Stump Merrill	1985, 1987	Managed the Yankees (1990–1991)	
Pat Corrales	1989	Managed the Texas Rangers (1978–1980), Philadelphia Phillies (1982–1983), Cleveland Indians (1983–1987)	
Graig Nettles^{+}	1991	Former Yankees third baseman (1973–1983)	
Ed Napoleon	1992	—	
Frank Howard^{+}	1993	Managed the San Diego Padres (1981) and New York Mets (1983)	
Brian Butterfield	1994–1995	—	
José Cardenal	1996–1999	—	
Lee Mazzilli^{+}	2000–2003	Former Yankees first baseman (1982); Managed the Baltimore Orioles (2004–2005)	
Tony Peña^{+}	2006–2008; 2015–2017	Managed the Kansas City Royals (2002–2005) Bench Coach the New York Yankees (2009–2014) First Base Coach the New York Yankees (2006–2008, 2015–2017)	
Mick Kelleher	2009–2014	—	
Reggie Willits	2018–2021	—	
Travis Chapman	2022–2025	Former Phillies Third baseman (2003), First Base Coach the New York Yankees (2022–2025)	
Dan Fiorito	2026–present		

=== Third base coaches ===
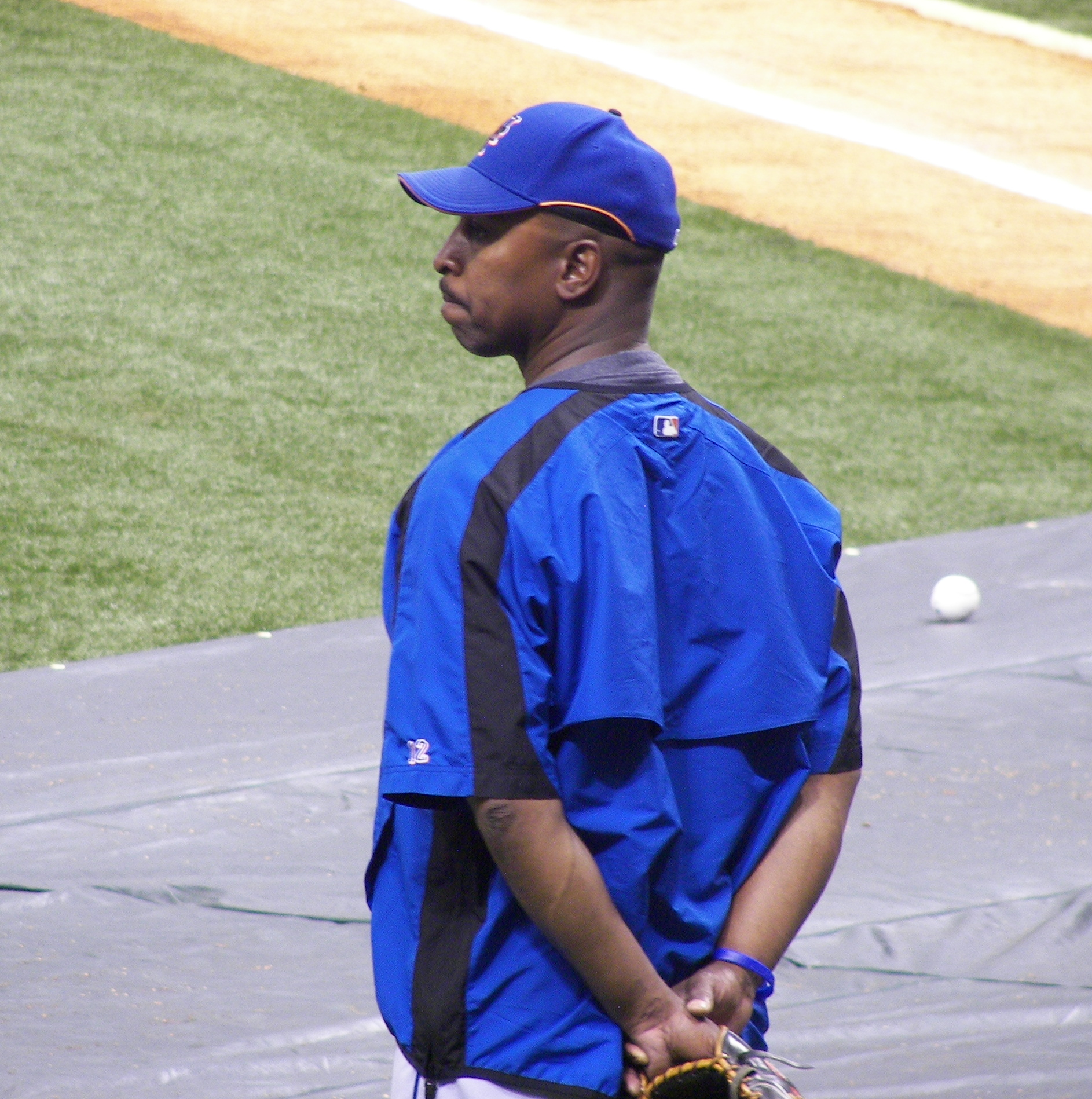
Prior to managing the New York Mets, Willie Randolph coached for the New York Yankees.

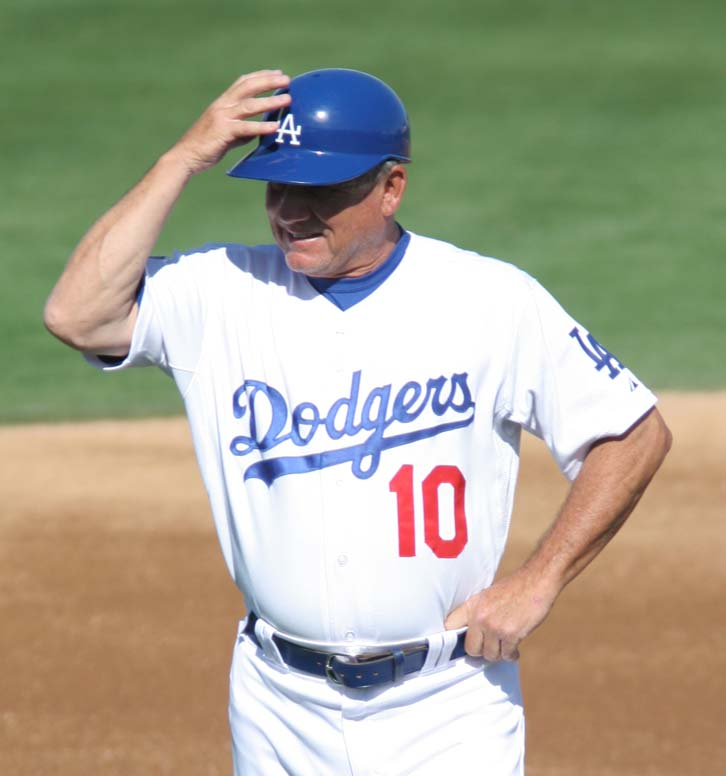
Larry Bowa was a member of Joe Torre's coaching staff with the Yankees, leaving for the Los Angeles Dodgers with Torre after the 2007 season.

Coach	Seasons	Notes	Ref
Frankie Crosetti^{+}	1946–1968	Former Yankees shortstop (1932–1948)	
Dick Howser^{+}	1969–1978	Former Yankees shortstop (1967–1968); Managed the Yankees (1980) and Kansas City Royals (1981–1986)	
Mike Ferraro	1979–1981	Managed the Cleveland Indians (1983) and Kansas City Royals (1986)	
Billy Martin^{+}	1979	Former Yankees second baseman (1950–1957); Managed the Minnesota Twins (1969), Detroit Tigers (1971–1973), Texas Rangers (1973–1975), Yankees (1975–1978, 1979, 1983, 1985, 1988), and Oakland Athletics (1980–1982)	
Joe Altobelli	1981–1982	Managed the San Francisco Giants (1977–1979), Baltimore Orioles (1983–1985), Chicago Cubs (1991)	
Don Zimmer^{+}	1983, 1986	Managed the San Diego Padres (1972–1973), Boston Red Sox (1976–1980), Texas Rangers (1981–1982), and Chicago Cubs (1988–1991)	
Gene Michael	1984–1986, 1988	Former Yankees shortstop (1968–1974); Managed the Yankees (1981–1982) and Chicago Cubs (1986–1987)	
Clete Boyer	1988, 1992–1993	Former Yankees third baseman (1957–1966)	
Lee Elia	1989	Managed the Chicago Cubs (1982–1983) and Philadelphia Phillies (1987–1988)	
Joe Sparks	1990	—	
Buck Showalter	1990–1991	Managed the Yankees (1992–1995), Arizona Diamondbacks (1998–2000), Texas Rangers (2003–2006), and the Baltimore Orioles (2010–2018) and the New York Mets (2022–2023)	
Willie Randolph^{+}	1994–2003	Former Yankees second baseman (1976–1988); Managed the New York Mets (2005–2008)	
Luis Sojo	2004–2005	Former Yankees infielder (1996–99, 2000–2001, 2003)	
Larry Bowa^{+}	2006–2007	Managed the San Diego Padres (1987–1988) and Philadelphia Phillies (2001–2004)	
Bobby Meacham	2008	Former Yankees shortstop (1983–1988)	
Rob Thomson	2009–2014	Bench Coach the New York Yankees (2008, 2015–2017) and the Philadelphia Phillies (2018–2022); Third Base Coach the New York Yankees (2009–2014)	—
Joe Espada	2015–2017		
Phil Nevin^{+}	2018–2021	Third base coach the San Francisco Giants (2017)	
Luis Rojas^{+}	2022–present	Managed the New York Mets (2020–2021)	

=== Positions unspecified ===
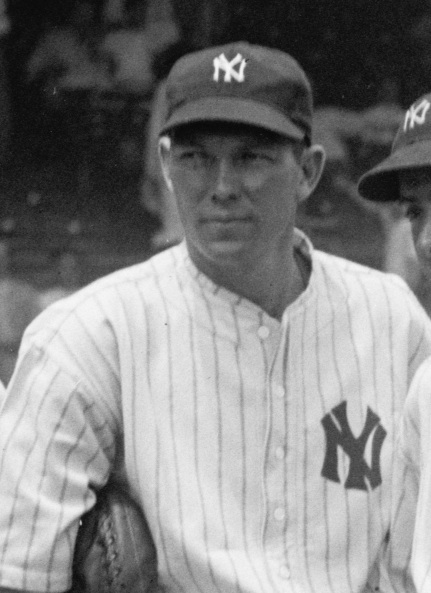
After his Hall of Fame playing career, Bill Dickey remained with the Yankees as a coach.

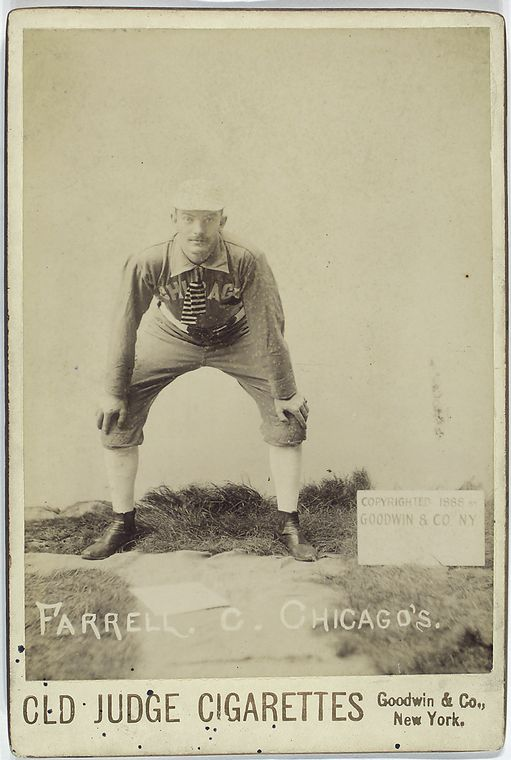
Duke Farrell was one of the earliest Major League Baseball coaches.

Coach	Seasons	Notes	Ref
Duke Farrell	1909, 1911; 1915–1917	—	
Tom Daly	1914	—	
Germany Schaefer	1916	Former Yankees outfielder (1916)	
Paddy O'Connor	1918–1919	Former Yankees catcher (1918)	
Charley O'Leary	1921–1930	—	
Frank Roth	1921–1922	—	
Hooks Wiltse	1925	—	
Fred Merkle	1925–1926	Former Yankees first baseman (1925–1926)	
Art Fletcher	1927–1945	Managed the Philadelphia Phillies (1923–26) and Yankees (1929)	
Harry Mathews	1929	—	
Bob Shawkey	1929	Former Yankees pitcher (1915–1927); Managed the Yankees (1930)	
Jimmy Burke	1931–1933	—	
Cy Perkins	1932–1933	Former Yankees catcher (1931)	
Johnny Schulte	1934–1948	—	
Joe Sewell^{*}	1934–1935	Former Yankees shortstop (1931–1933)	
Earle Combs^{*}	1936–1944	Former Yankees outfielder (1924–1935)	
Paul Schreiber	1942, 1945	—	
Johnny Neun	1944–1946	Managed the Yankees (1946) and Cincinnati Reds (1947–1948)	
Red Rolfe^{+}	1946	Former Yankees third baseman (1931, 1934–1942); Managed the Detroit Tigers (1949–1952)	
Chuck Dressen	1947–1948	Managed the Cincinnati Reds (1934–1937), Brooklyn Dodgers (1951–1953), Washington Senators (1955–1957), Milwaukee Braves (1960–1961), and Detroit Tigers (1963–1966)	
Bill Dickey^{*}	1949–1957, 1960	Former Yankees catcher (1928–1946); Managed the Yankees (1946)	
Tommy Henrich^{+}	1951	Former Yankees outfielder (1937–1942, 1946–1950)	
Ralph Houk	1953–1954	Former Yankees catcher (1947–54); Managed the New York Yankees (1961–1963, 1966–1973), Detroit Tigers (1974–1978), and Boston Red Sox (1981–1984)	
Randy Gumpert	1957	Former Yankees pitcher (1946–1948)	
Charlie Keller	1957	Former Yankees outfielder (1939–1949, 1952)	
Earl Torgeson	1961	Former Yankees first baseman (1961)	
Dale Long^{+}	1963	Former Yankees first baseman (1960, 1962–1963)	
