= Matt Blake =

American baseball coach (born 1985)

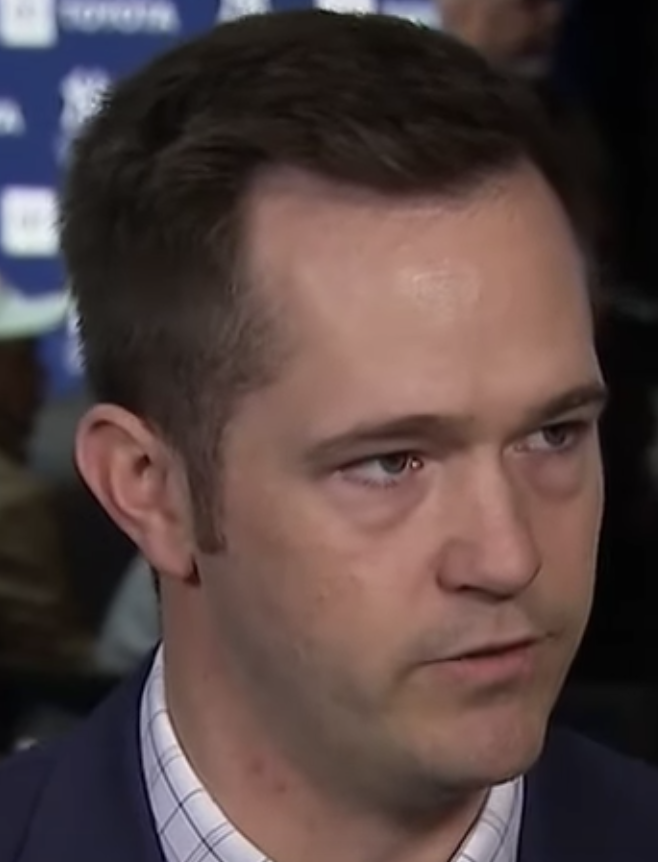
- Blake at the Gerrit Cole press conference in 2019

New York Yankees – No. 77
- Pitching coach
- Born: May 14, 1985 (age 40); Concord, New Hampshire, U.S.
- Bats: Left Throws: Left

Teams
- As coach: New York Yankees (2020–present)

Matthew Blake (born May 14, 1985) is an American professional baseball coach. He is the pitching coach for the New York Yankees of Major League Baseball (MLB).

== Career ==
Blake attended Concord High School in Concord, New Hampshire. Blake was a three sport athlete. He excelled in golf, basketball, and baseball. Blake attended the College of the Holy Cross, and played college baseball all four years for the Crusaders. Blake graduated from Holy Cross with degrees in psychology and philosophy.

Blake started his baseball coaching career in 2009 as the pitching coach for Lincoln-Sudbury Regional High School in Sudbury, Massachusetts, and as a pitching coordinator for Cressey Sports Performance in Hudson, Massachusetts. Blake began his career in professional baseball in 2010 as an associate scout for the New York Yankees. He served as the pitching coach for the Yarmouth–Dennis Red Sox of the Cape Cod League during the 2015 season. He joined the Cleveland Indians organization in 2015 as a lower level pitching coordinator, and later was promoted to assistant director of pitching development in 2016.

The New York Yankees hired Blake as their pitching coach on November 7, 2019. After the 2022 season, Blake signed a new three-year contract with the Yankees. The Yankees exercised an option for the 2026 season.

Sporting positions
Preceded by Larry Rothschild	New York Yankees Pitching Coach; 2020–present	Succeeded by Incumbent
