= Rick Down =

American baseball hitting coach (1950–2019)

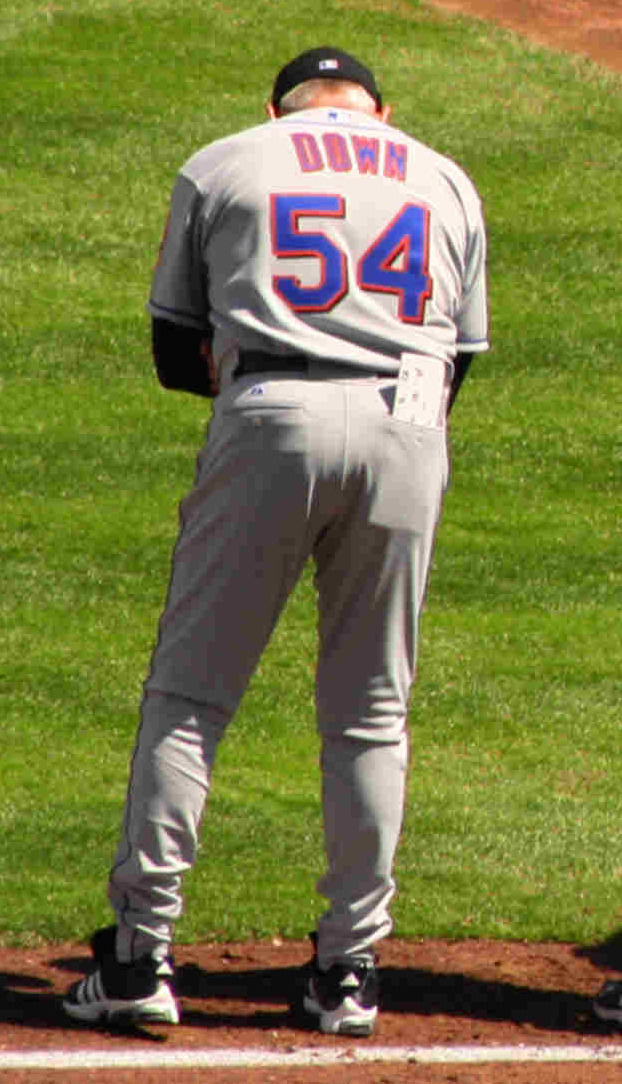
- Down as hitting coach of the Mets in 2006
- Hitting coach
- Born: December 14, 1950; Wyandotte, Michigan, U.S.
- Died: January 5, 2019 (aged 68); Las Vegas, Nevada, U.S.
- Batted: Right Threw: Right
- Stats at Baseball Reference

Teams
- California Angels (1987–1988); New York Yankees (1993–1995); Baltimore Orioles (1996–1998); Los Angeles Dodgers (1999–2000); Boston Red Sox (2001); New York Yankees (2002–2003); New York Mets (2005–2007)

Richard John Down (December 14, 1950 – January 5, 2019) was an American professional baseball hitting coach. He was a hitting coach in Major League Baseball (MLB) for the New York Yankees, Boston Red Sox, Los Angeles Angels of Anaheim, Los Angeles Dodgers, New York Mets, and the Baltimore Orioles.

== Playing career ==
Down was born in Wyandotte, Michigan, in 1950. He was drafted by the Montreal Expos in the 74th round of the 1969 MLB draft out of high school. Down never made the major leagues as a player, peaking in AAA ball with a variety of teams between 1971 and 1975. He also played some minor league games in 1978 while coaching with the Mariners' minor league teams. Throughout his minor league career, he primarily played first base and the outfield.

== Coaching career ==
After his playing career, Down turned to coaching. He started as an assistant coach for the University of Nevada, Las Vegas baseball team from 1979 to 1984, serving under Fred Dallimore. The team had six consecutive winning seasons and reach the NCAA Division I Baseball Tournament three times during his tenure.

After his time at UNLV, he served as a roving hitting instructor for the California Angels. Over the next two decades, he worked for a variety of minor and major league teams, mostly as a hitting coach. In that time, he worked for the Yankees, Orioles, Dodgers, Red Sox, and Mets.

He successfully managed the Columbus Clippers of the AAA International League to multiple championships, but like his playing career, his managerial career peaked in AAA and he never managed a major league team. However, he did serve as a hitting coach in the majors, for multiple teams. He was the hitting coach for the New York Yankees under Buck Showalter from 1993 to 1996; Showalter praised his teaching abilities and his dedication to improving his players' hitting abilities. In 1996, he moved to the Baltimore Orioles, who set the then-MLB record of 257 home runs in a season.

== Career highlights ==
- In 2002, the Yankees hit 223 home runs, second most in the American League and second highest single season total in franchise history.
- The Yankees led the majors in batting average in each of his first two seasons as a hitting coach (1993–94). In 1994, the team's batting average of .290 was the highest Yankees' average since 1936 (.300) and the highest in the majors since Boston hit .302 in 1950.
- He helped guide the 2000 Dodgers to a franchise record 211 home runs.
- He led the 1996 Orioles to a then major league record 251 home runs in his first season with the club.
- From 1990 to 1992, he served as the manager of the Yankees' Columbus (AAA) team of the International League. He led the 1992 club to a 95-49 record and a Governors' Cup Championship. The 95 victories were a franchise record and were the most wins in the IL since 1960, when Toronto went 100-54.
- In three seasons at Columbus, he directed the Clippers to three straight International League West Division titles and two straight Governors' Cups. In three years, he won 242 games and had a winning percentage of .619.
- He compiled a 122-273 record (.309 percentage) in six years as a minor league manager.
- Spent seven seasons in the minors as an outfielder. Hit .257 with 33 home runs, 247 RBI and 54 stolen bases in 745 games. He was placed on Montreal's major league roster on September 30, 1971.
- Down also served as an advance scout for the San Francisco Giants and hitting coach for the Spokane Indians of the Northwest League.

Sporting positions
Preceded by Bucky Dent	Columbus Clippers Manager; 1989	Succeeded by Stump Merrill
Preceded by Buck Showalter	Albany-Colonie Yankees Manager; 1990	Succeeded by Dan Radison
Preceded by Stump Merrill	Columbus Clippers Manager; 1990–1992	Succeeded by Stump Merrill
Preceded by Frank Howard	New York Yankees Hitting Coach; 1993–1995	Succeeded by Chris Chambliss
Preceded by Lee May	Baltimore Orioles Hitting Coach; 1996–1998	Succeeded by Terry Crowley
Preceded by Reggie Smith	Los Angeles Dodgers Hitting Coach; 1999–2000	Succeeded by Jack Clark
Preceded by Jim Rice	Boston Red Sox Hitting Coach; 2001	Succeeded by Dwight Evans
Preceded by Chris Chambliss	New York Yankees Hitting Coach; 2002–2003	Succeeded by Don Mattingly
Preceded by Don Baylor	New York Mets Hitting Coach; 2005 – July 11, 2007	Succeeded by Howard Johnson
