= Tony Peña =

Dominican baseball player (born 1957)

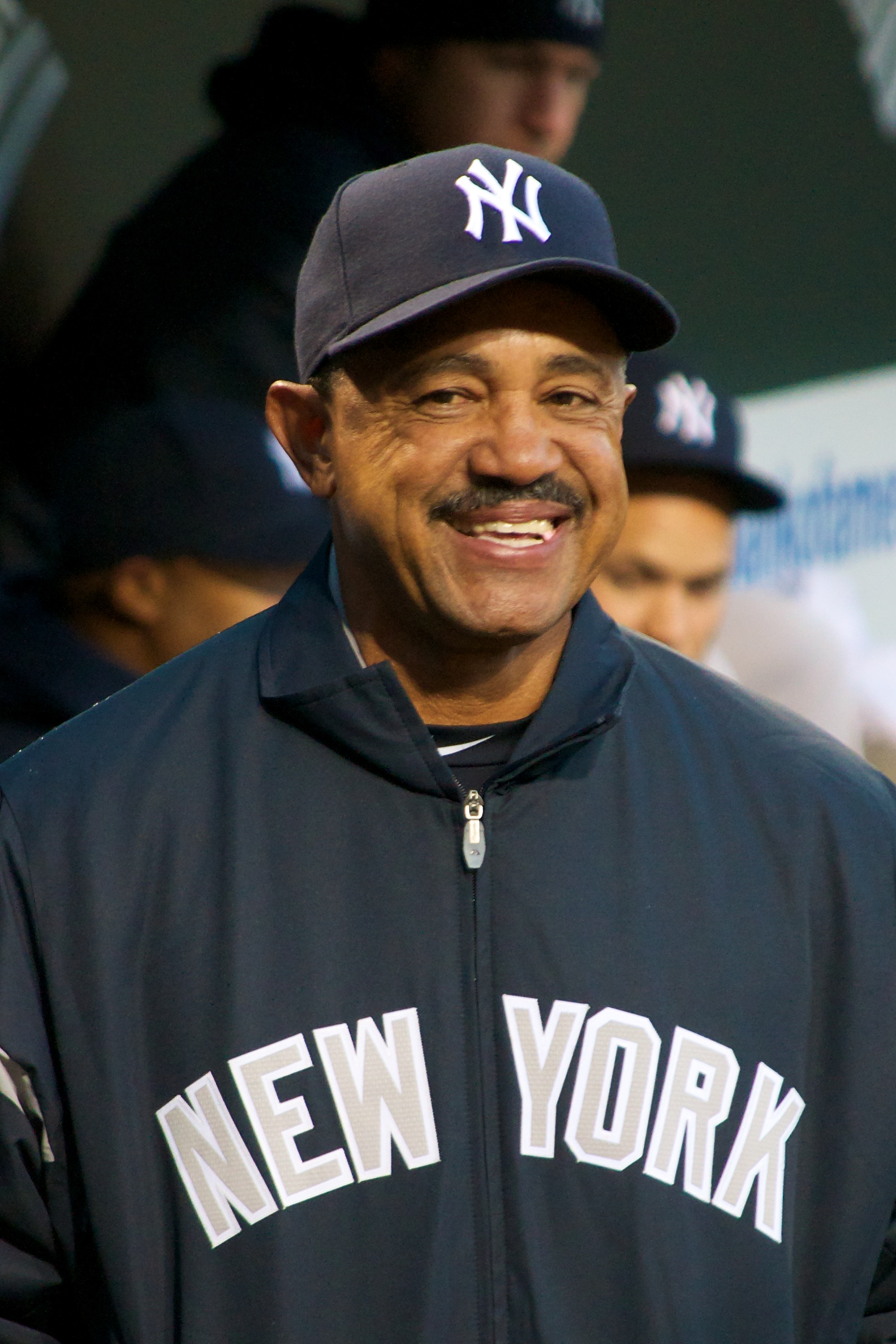
- Peña in 2012
- Catcher / Manager
- Born: June 4, 1957 (age 69); Monte Cristi, Dominican Republic
- Batted: Right Threw: Right

MLB debut
- September 1, 1980, for the Pittsburgh Pirates

Last MLB appearance
- September 28, 1997, for the Houston Astros

MLB statistics
- Batting average: .260
- Home runs: 107
- Runs batted in: 708
- Managerial record: 198–285
- Winning %: .410
- Stats at Baseball Reference

Teams
- As player: Pittsburgh Pirates (1980–1986); St. Louis Cardinals (1987–1989); Boston Red Sox (1990–1993); Cleveland Indians (1994–1996); Chicago White Sox (1997); Houston Astros (1997); As manager: Kansas City Royals (2002–2005); As coach: New York Yankees (2006–2017)

Career highlights and awards
- 5× All-Star (1982, 1984–1986, 1989); World Series champion (2009); 4× Gold Glove Award (1983–1985, 1991); AL Manager of the Year (2003)

Member of the Caribbean

Baseball Hall of Fame
- Induction: 2016
Medals
Men's baseball
Manager for Dominican Republic
World Baseball Classic
| Gold medal – first place | 2013 San Francisco | Team |

Antonio Francisco Peña Padilla (Spanish pronunciation: [ˈtoni ˈpeɲa]; born 4 June 1957) is a Dominican former professional baseball player, manager and coach. He played as a catcher in Major League Baseball for the Pittsburgh Pirates, St. Louis Cardinals, Boston Red Sox, Cleveland Indians, Chicago White Sox, and Houston Astros. After his playing career, Peña was the manager of the Kansas City Royals between 2002 and 2005. He was most recently the first base coach for the New York Yankees. A four-time Gold Glove Award winner, Peña was known for his defensive abilities as well as his unorthodox squat behind home plate.

== Playing career ==
=== Pittsburgh Pirates ===
In 1975, Peña attended a tryout camp held by the Pittsburgh Pirates in the Dominican Republic and was signed as an amateur free agent for $4,000. Originally an outfielder, he didn't start playing as a catcher until 1977 while playing in the minor leagues. As a catcher, Peña adopted an unorthodox squat behind the plate when there were no runners on base, extending his left leg straight out while squatting on his right leg. Similar stances are still being adopted by current players. He did this in order to help his pitchers keep their pitches low in the strike zone.

In 1979, Peña hit for a .313 batting average along with 34 home runs and 97 runs batted in for the Buffalo Bisons. The following year, he posted a .329 batting average and .367 on-base percentage with the Portland Beavers before making his major league debut at the age of 23 that September. In the offseason, he played for Águilas Cibaeñas in the Dominican Professional Baseball League and won the Rookie of the Year award.

In 1981, his path to the majors was initially less clear. He was stuck behind Ed Ott and Steve Nicosia, and his English was poor. However, the Pirates traded Ott on 1 April and Peña platooned alongside Nicosia before taking the full-time catching job. He hit an impressive .300 batting average in 66 games and finished in sixth place in the 1981 National League Rookie of the Year Award.

Peña further cemented his place as the Pirates' starting catcher that offseason by batting .313 in the Dominican Republic winter league baseball to earn MVP honors. He also hit .431 with two home runs and 12 RBl in spring training. In 1982, he took over as the Pirates full-time catcher and had a .340 batting average on the first of July, helping him earn a spot as a reserve for the National League team in the 1982 All-Star Game. He finished the year with a .296 batting average. While he committed 16 errors, he finished second among National League catchers in assists and third in putouts and caught stealing percentage. He again won MVP honors in the Dominican Professional Baseball League.

Peña had one of his best seasons in 1983, posting career-highs with a .301 batting average and 15 home runs as the Pirates improved to finish in second place in the National League Eastern Division. He led National League catchers with 976 putouts and finished second to Gary Carter with a .992 fielding percentage, earning him his first Gold Glove Award. Peña also finished 12th in voting for the 1983 National League Most Valuable Player Award.

The Pirates entered into a period of decline, finishing in last place for three consecutive years between 1984 and 1986 however, Peña still led National League catchers in assists, putouts and baserunners caught stealing in 1984. He was named an All-Star and won a Gold Glove that season.

In 1985, he again led the league in assists and baserunners caught stealing. Peña was again selected to the All-Star Game and won another Gold Glove. When Peña broke the 100 assists barrier in 1985, he joined Johnny Bench, Jim Sundberg and Gary Carter as the only major league catchers to have more than 100 assists in a season since the end of the Second World War.

In a 1986 poll of major league managers, Peña was selected as the best throwing catcher in the major leagues. He was an All-Star for the third season in a row in 1986. In November 1986, Peña participated in the MLB Japan All-Star Series. He led a team of major league All-Stars to victory over a team of Japanese All-Stars and was chosen as the MVP of the American team. Before the start of the following season, with Peña nearing the end of his contract, the Pirates made a decision to trade him rather than lose him through free agency.

=== St. Louis Cardinals ===
On 1 April, 1987, Peña was traded to the St. Louis Cardinals for Andy Van Slyke and Mike LaValliere. He was also signed to a two-year contract extension. Three games into his Cardinals' career, he suffered a broken left thumb in a game against his former team, the Pirates. He missed more than a month and returned to post a career-low .214 batting average, including a .183 average in the second half. Nevertheless, the Cardinals won the National League Eastern Division crown with Peña rebounding to post a .381 batting average in the 1987 National League Championship Series as, the Cardinals defeated the San Francisco Giants. In the 1987 World Series against the Minnesota Twins he hit .409 with four RBI as the Cardinals lost in a seven-game series.

In 1988, Peña recovered with a .263 batting average along with 10 home runs and 51 runs batted in. He also led National League catchers with a .994 fielding percentage and was second in putouts and third in assists. He hit .259 with four home runs and 37 RBI in 1989. He earned his fifth All-Star selection and led the league's catchers with a .997 fielding percentage, committing only two errors in 134 games.

=== Boston Red Sox ===
In November 1989, Peña was granted free agency and signed a three-year, $6.4 million contract with the Boston Red Sox. In 1990, he led American League catchers in games played, range factor, and putouts, while finishing second in assists and fielding percentage. He also hit .263 with seven home runs and 56 RBI, coming in 21st place in the American League MVP voting that year. Amid a September skid that nearly cost the Red Sox the division, Peña called the team quitters and threw a folding chair in the clubhouse in an apparent attempt to fire up his teammates. Several players were offended by this and blamed it on his English language skills.

On 18 September, In Game 3 of the 1990 American League Championship Series, Peña's two defensive lapses against the Oakland Athletics allowed three runs and cost the Red Sox the game. He was also behind the plate in Game 4 when Boston starter Roger Clemens was ejected in the second inning for arguing balls and strikes with the home plate umpire.

In 1991, Peña led American League catchers in defensive games, putouts, double plays, runners caught stealing, and range factor. His performance earned him a Gold Glove Award, making him one of only five players at the time to win the award in both the American and National Leagues. He led AL catchers in putouts and double plays in 1992. After the season, he signed a one-year extension with Boston.

Peña struggled in 1993, hitting just .181 in 126 games. He lost playing time to backup catchers Bob Melvin and John Flaherty. On 23 May, Peña got his 1,500th career hit in a game against the New York Yankees.

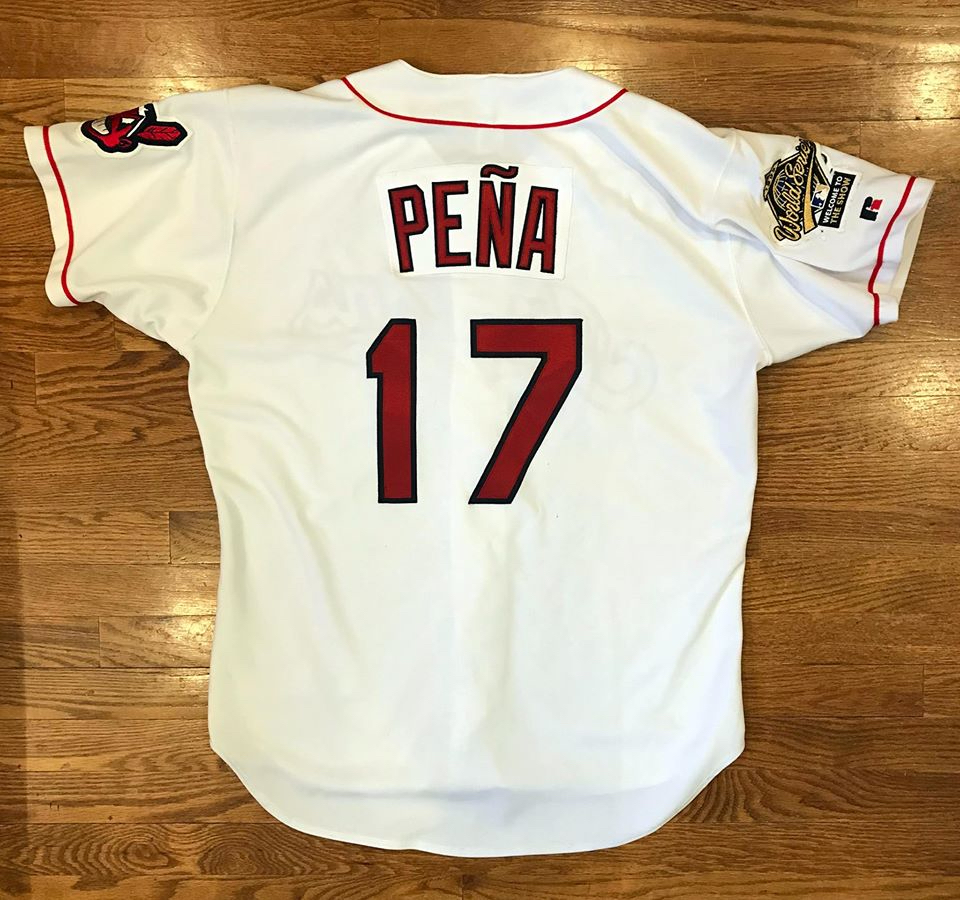
1995 Cleveland Indians #17 Tony Pena World Series Home Jersey

=== Cleveland Indians ===
Prior to the 1994 season, Peña signed a minor league deal with the Cleveland Indians to serve as the backup catcher behind Sandy Alomar Jr. Although his batting statistics weren't as strong as his earlier career, Peña was still valued for his strong defensive skills as a catcher and proved to be an invaluable substitute behind the injury-prone Alomar. Peña also proved to be a mentor to a young Manny Ramirez during their time in Cleveland together.

In the strike-shortened 1994 season, He hit .296 with a .341 on-base percentage. With Alomar out after undergoing knee surgery, Peña caught the majority of the Indians' games in 1995. Despite a .195 batting average during the regular season, he hit a walk-off home run with two outs in the bottom of the 13th inning of Game 1 in the 1995 American League Division Series that helped propel the Indians to a three-game sweep of the Boston Red Sox. Ending after 2:00 AM, it became the longest night game in postseason history by time (5:01) and innings (13). The Indians made it all the way to the 1995 World Series before losing to the Atlanta Braves in a six-game series.

Peña returned to Cleveland for the 1996 season. He hit just .195 in 67 games behind a healthy Alomar.

=== Chicago White Sox ===
Peña signed with the Chicago White Sox for the 1997 season and served alongside Ron Karkovice and Chad Kreuter as one of the team's three catchers to start the season.

=== Houston Astros ===
On 15 August 1997, he was traded to the Houston Astros for right-handed pitched Julien Tucker. At the end of the year, he retired as a player at the age of 40.

In an eighteen-year major league career, Peña played in 1,988 games, accumulating 1,687 hits in 6,489 at bats for a .260 career batting average along with 107 home runs, 708 runs batted in and a .309 on-base percentage. He ended his career with a .991 fielding percentage. He led his league five times in putouts and twice in fielding percentage, assists, range factor and in baserunners caught stealing. A five-time All-Star, he won four Gold Glove Awards during his career. Peña's 1,950 games played as a catcher rank him sixth on the all-time list. His 156 career double plays ranks fifth all-time among major league catchers.

In 2011, Peña was inducted into the Buffalo Baseball Hall of Fame Hall of Fame along with Cleveland Indians broadcaster Jim Rosenhaus. In 2016, he was inducted into the Caribbean Baseball Hall of Fame.

== Coaching and managerial career ==
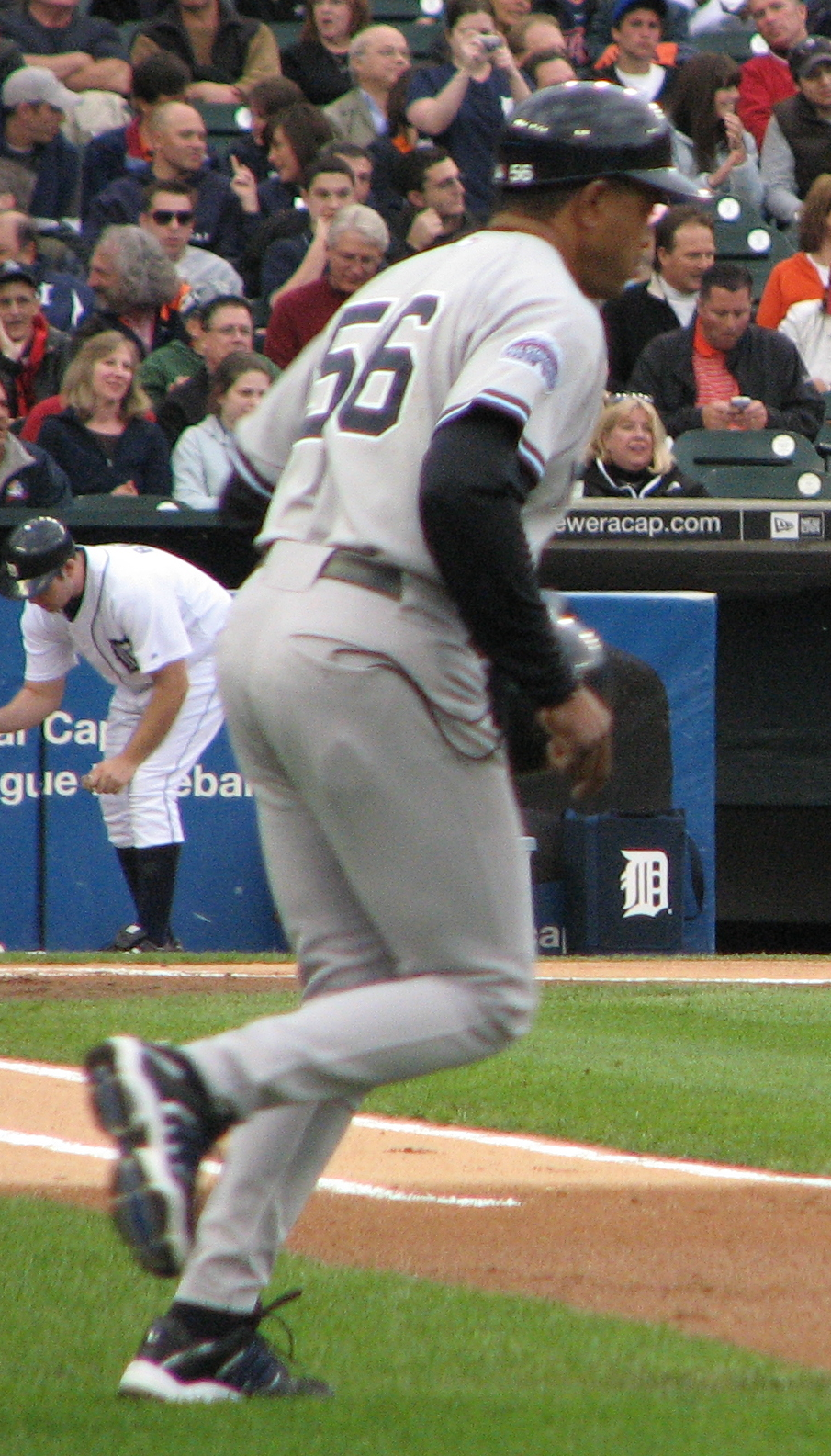
Tony Peña in 2008

After announcing his retirement at the end of the 1997 season, Peña was hired by the White Sox to coordinate the organization's Dominican operations and to serve as the manager of its Arizona League rookie ball team. For the 1999 season, he was hired by the Houston Astros to be the manager of the New Orleans Zephyrs in Triple-A. In 2001, he led them to a first-place finish in the East Division of the Pacific Coast League. He also led Águilas Cibaeñas of the Dominican Winter Baseball League to two domestic championships in 1998 and 2000, and Caribbean Series title in 2001.

In May 2002, Peña was hired as the new manager of the Kansas City Royals, replacing Tony Muser, who was fired on 29 April. Peña led the 2003 Royals to a seven-game lead in the American League Central Division by mid-season before settling into a third-place finish with a record of 83–79. It was the Royals' first season with a winning record since the strike-shortened 1994 season. Peña was rewarded with the 2003 American League Manager of the Year Award.

Peña's Royals were less successful in 2004, finishing in last place in the Central Division of the American League with 104 losses. He resigned as manager of the Royals after a loss to the Toronto Blue Jays on 10 May 2005, as the Royals had the worst record in the American League at 8–25. He was replaced by interim manager Bob Schaefer.

On 3 November 2005, Peña was named first base coach of the New York Yankees. On 21 October 2007, the Yankees announced that Peña would interview to replace Joe Torre as manager. However, the Yankees chose to hire former catcher Joe Girardi to manage the team instead. Peña remained as the Yankees first base coach in 2008, before shifting to bench coach for the 2009 season. He assumed the role of Yankees first base coach once more when they hired Joe Espada as the third base coach for the 2015 season and shifted former Yankees third base coach Rob Thomson to the role of bench coach.

Peña once again managed Águilas Cibaeñas during the 2010–2011 season. He was considered a candidate to replace Terry Francona as the manager of the Red Sox in 2011 before the job went to Bobby Valentine. In 2012, Valentine was fired as Red Sox manager after just one year, and Peña was interviewed to be the Red Sox manager.

In 2013, Peña was named the manager of the Dominican Republic National Baseball Team for the World Baseball Classic. Armed with a roster that included Jose Reyes, Robinson Canó, Nelson Cruz, Edwin Encarnación, Fernando Rodney, and many others, the Dominican team stormed through the WBC with an 8–0 record, culminating in a 3–0 victory over Puerto Rico to win the championship. They were the first team in WBC history to go undefeated throughout the tournament.

After the 2017 season, the Yankees hired Aaron Boone to replace Girardi as manager, and Peña was replaced by Reggie Willits. He returned to manage Águilas Cibaeñas for the 2023–2024 season.

== Personal life ==
Peña's mother, Rosalia, was a star softball player in the Dominican Republic. She taught him and his brothers how to play baseball.

Peña is married to Amaris and they have three children. He is the father of pitcher Tony Peña Jr., and catcher Francisco Peña. Peña's daughter, Jennifer Amaris, won Miss RD USA 2007 and represented the Dominican Community in the US in Miss Dominican Republic 2008 and came in sixth place. His brother, Ramón Peña, pitched with the Detroit Tigers organization.

In May 2005, Peña was called to testify in divorce court, where it was revealed that he had an affair with a neighbor. During this time, he decided to resign as manager of the Kansas City Royals.

== Managerial record ==
| Team | Year | Regular season | | | | | Postseason | | | |
| Team | Year | Games | Won | Lost | Win % | Finish | Won | Lost | Win % | Result |
|---|---|---|---|---|---|---|---|---|---|---|
| KC | 2002 | 126 | 49 | 77 | .389 | 4th in AL Central | – | – | – | |
| KC | 2003 | 162 | 83 | 79 | .512 | 3rd in AL Central | – | – | – | |
| KC | 2004 | 162 | 58 | 104 | .358 | 5th in AL Central | – | – | – | |
| KC | 2005 | 33 | 8 | 25 | .242 | (fired) | – | – | – | |
| Total | | 483 | 198 | 285 | .402 | | 0 | 0 | – | |

== See also ==
- List of Afro-Latinos
- List of Major League Baseball career putouts as a catcher leaders
- List of Major League Baseball players from the Dominican Republic

Sporting positions
| Preceded by Roy White; Mick Kelleher | New York Yankees First Base Coach; 2006–2008; 2015–2017 | Succeeded by Mick Kelleher; Reggie Willits |
| Preceded by Rob Thomson | New York Yankees Bench Coach; 2009–2014 | Succeeded by Rob Thomson |
