= Bill Evers =

Dominican baseball player & coach

- Born: January 29, 1954 (age 72); New York, New York, U.S.
- Bats: Right Throws: Right
- Stats at Baseball Reference

Teams
- Tampa Bay Devil Rays (2006–2007); Minnesota Twins (2019–2021)

William Joseph Evers (born January 29, 1954) is an American professional baseball coach and a former minor league player and longtime manager and instructor. In November 2018, he was named a coach on the staff of Rocco Baldelli, the 2019 manager of the Minnesota Twins of Major League Baseball. The appointment marked the second MLB staff assignment of Evers' 44-year baseball career: he spent 2006 and 2007 as the bench coach during Joe Maddon's first two seasons as skipper of the Tampa Bay Devil Rays.

== Career ==
Evers was born in New York City. He received his BA in management and recreation from Eckerd College in St. Petersburg, Florida, in 1976 and was selected by the Chicago Cubs in the sixth round of the secondary phase of the June 1976 Major League Baseball draft. During his four-year playing career, Evers was a catcher and first baseman who batted and threw right-handed; he was listed as 5 feet 10 inches (1.78 m) tall and 190 pounds (86 kg). Peaking at the Triple-A level with 30 games played in 1978–79, he hit 11 home runs with an even 200 hits in 274 total games, with 161 walks and 113 strikeouts.

After coaching in the Cubs' minor-league organization, Evers became a manager in the San Francisco Giants and New York Yankees systems through 1995, then joined the fledgling Tampa Bay Devil Rays' organization in 1996, two seasons before the Rays' American League debut. He spent ten years managing in Tampa Bay's farm system, including eight seasons at the helm of the Durham Bulls, the club's Triple-A affiliate, where he managed Baldelli as a young player. By the time he was named the MLB Rays' bench coach for 2006, Evers had spent 19 years as a minor-league pilot and compiled a 1,381–1,206 (.534) record, then the second-most wins among active minor-league managers. He won five minor league championships and managed three of the Rays' five minor league championship teams through 2005.

In 2008, Evers was succeeded as bench coach by former Devil Ray player Dave Martinez. He then served Tampa Bay as a scout for two seasons, and spent nine years (2010–2018) as the field coordinator for the Rays' minor league organization. In all, he was a member of the Rays' system for 23 years before his appointment to Baldelli's staff. In September 2021, Evers announced his intention to retire at the end of the season, and served as acting manager in Baldelli's place when Baldelli took paternity leave that same month.

Preceded by Stump Merrill	Columbus Clippers manager 1995	Succeeded by Stump Merrill
Preceded by Triple-A franchise established	Durham Bulls manager 1998–2005	Succeeded by John Tamargo
Preceded by John McLaren	Tampa Bay Devil Rays bench coach 2006–2007	Succeeded by Dave Martinez
