= Roy White =

American baseball player (born 1943)

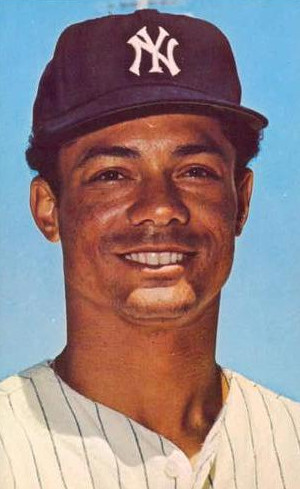
- White in 1970
- Left fielder
- Born: December 27, 1943 (age 82); Los Angeles, California, U.S.
- Batted: Switch Threw: Right

MLB debut
- September 7, 1965, for the New York Yankees

Last MLB appearance
- September 27, 1979, for the New York Yankees

MLB statistics
- Batting average: .271
- Home runs: 160
- Runs batted in: 758

NPB statistics
- Batting average: .283
- Home runs: 54
- Runs batted in: 172
- Stats at Baseball Reference

Teams
- New York Yankees (1965–1979); Yomiuri Giants (1980–1982)

Career highlights and awards
- 2× All-Star (1969, 1970); 2× World Series champion (1977, 1978)

Roy Hilton White (born December 27, 1943) is an American former professional baseball player and coach. He played his entire career in Major League Baseball as an outfielder for the New York Yankees between 1965 and 1979. With the Yankees, he won two championships in 1977 and 1978, both over his hometown Los Angeles Dodgers.

White, who came up a year after the Yankees’ final “dynastic” World Series appearance in 1964, is the only player from the franchise's subsequent period of decline during the mid to late 1960s to participate in their championships of the late 1970s.

== Playing career ==
White, a switch hitter, was named to the American League All-Star team in 1969 and in 1970. In 1971, he set an American League record for most sacrifice flies in a season with 17. White led the American League in walks in 1972 and in runs in 1976. He played on three American League pennant winners (in 1976, 1977, and 1978), and two World Series championship teams (1977 and 1978).

After playing in the major leagues, he spent three seasons playing in Japan for the Tokyo Giants.

In a 15-year major league career, White played in 1,881 games, accumulating 1,803 hits in 6,650 at bats for a .271 career batting average along with 160 home runs, 758 runs batted in and a .360 on-base percentage. He ended his career with a .986 fielding percentage. A sure-handed fielder who took no chances, White led American League left fielders in fielding percentage for four consecutive years between 1968 and 1971.

== Coaching career and retirement ==
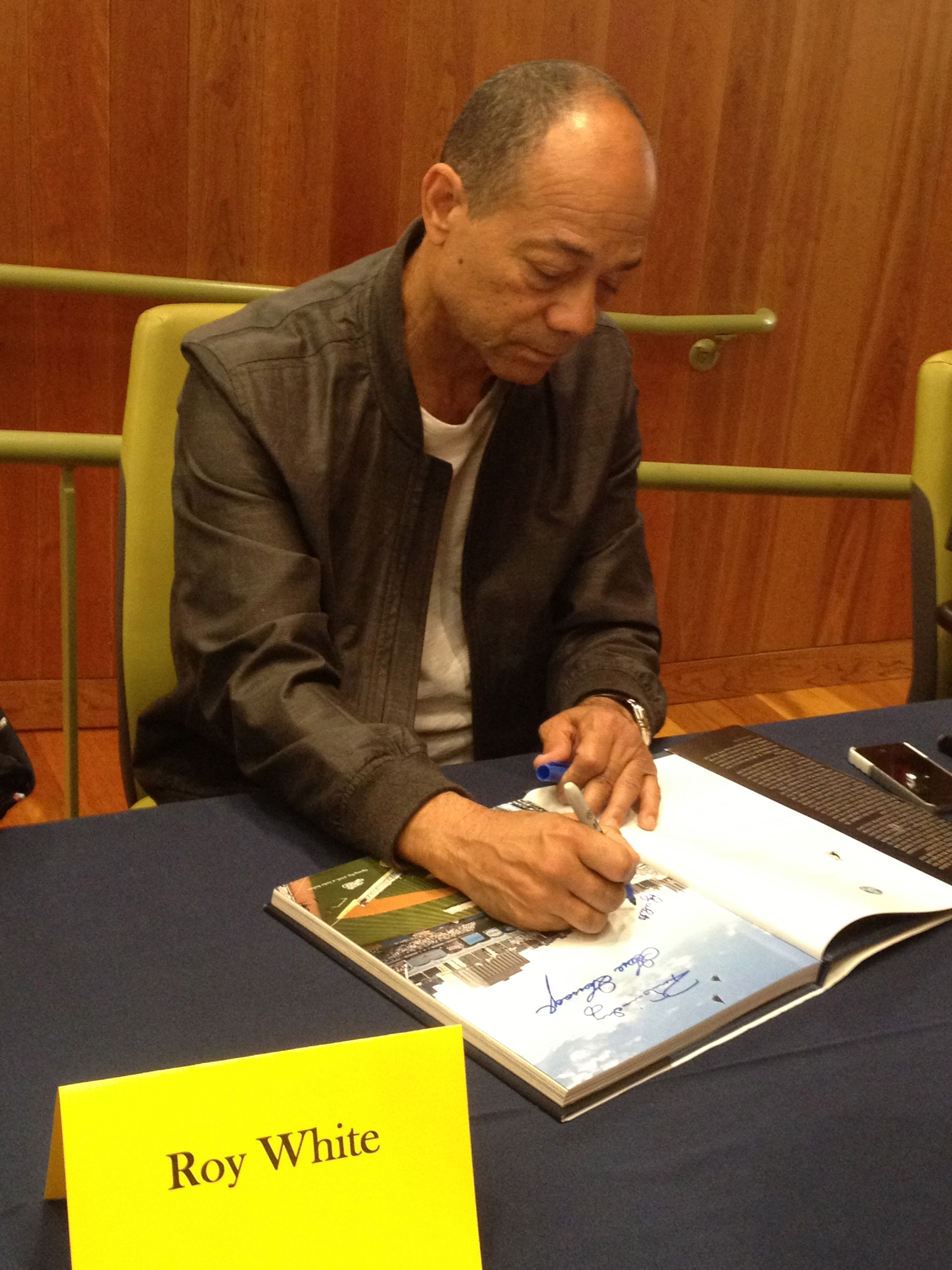
White at the Yogi Berra Museum and Learning Center in 2013

White served as a Yankee coach for three seasons in the mid-1980s before returning to the coaching staff at the start of 2004. He also spent time as the minor league hitting coach for the Oakland Athletics organization.

In 2002 he established The Roy White Foundation, a charity aimed to help children and young adults in the New York area who would like to attend college, but do not have the financial resources to do so.

White, who is half African American (and half White through his father, Marcus White), appeared in a 2011 interview for UniWatch on Page 2 of ESPN.com about his time in Georgia with the Yankees’ Double-A farm team, the Columbus Confederate Yankees, during the mid-1960s, which had a patch of the Confederate flag on its uniform. White commented that even at the height of the civil rights movement he didn't notice the patch nor pay attention to its symbolism. Instead, the native Southern Californian was faced with contending with overt racism in the Southern United States at the time.

In 2014, White receive a Special Recognition Award presented by the Order Sons of Italy in America, Columbus Lodge #2143 for his efforts to promote higher education to underprivileged students through the Roy White Foundation.

== See also ==
- List of Major League Baseball career stolen bases leaders
- List of Major League Baseball annual runs scored leaders
- List of Major League Baseball players who spent their entire career with one franchise

Sporting positions
Preceded by Yogi Berra	New York Yankees First Base Coach; 1983–1984	Succeeded by Doug Holmquist
Preceded by Doug Holmquist	New York Yankees First Base Coach; 1986	Succeeded by Stump Merrill
Preceded by Lee Mazzilli	New York Yankees First Base Coach; 2004–2005	Succeeded by Tony Peña
