= Bucky Dent =

American baseball player, coach, and manager (born 1951)

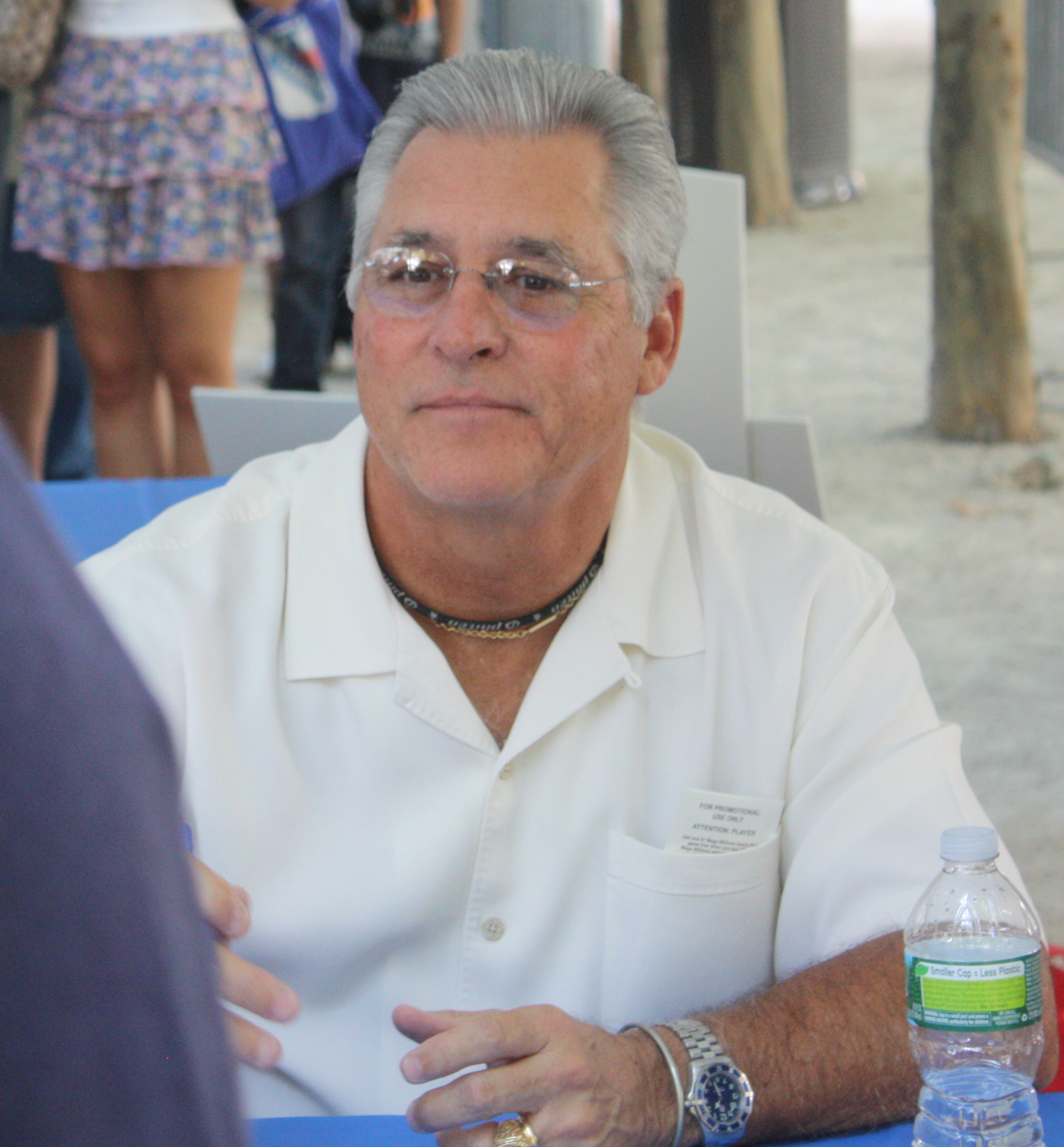
- Dent in 2010
- Shortstop / Manager
- Born: November 25, 1951 (age 74); Savannah, Georgia, U.S.
- Batted: Right Threw: Right

MLB debut
- June 1, 1973, for the Chicago White Sox

Last MLB appearance
- September 11, 1984, for the Kansas City Royals

MLB statistics
- Batting average: .247
- Home runs: 40
- Runs batted in: 423
- Managerial record: 36–53
- Winning %: .404
- Stats at Baseball Reference

Teams
- As player: Chicago White Sox (1973–1976); New York Yankees (1977–1982); Texas Rangers (1982–1983); Kansas City Royals (1984); As manager: New York Yankees (1989–1990); As coach: St. Louis Cardinals (1991–1994); Texas Rangers (1995–2001); Cincinnati Reds (2006–2007)

Career highlights and awards
- 3× All-Star (1975, 1980, 1981); 2× World Series champion (1977, 1978); World Series MVP (1978)

Russell Earl "Bucky" Dent (né O'Dey; born November 25, 1951) is an American former professional baseball player and manager. He played in Major League Baseball (MLB) for the Chicago White Sox, New York Yankees, Texas Rangers, and Kansas City Royals from 1973 to 1984. He managed the Yankees in 1989 and 1990.

Dent earned two World Series rings as the starting shortstop for the Yankees in 1977 and 1978, both over the Los Angeles Dodgers and was voted the World Series Most Valuable Player Award in 1978. Dent is famous for his home run in a tie-breaker game against the Boston Red Sox at Fenway Park at the end of the 1978 regular season.

== Early life ==
Born out of wedlock in Savannah, Georgia, to Denise O'Dey, Dent went home from the hospital with his mother's brother James Earl Dent, and James' wife, Sarah. Bucky and his half-brother were raised by the Dents, who changed his last name to "Dent", but his mother would not allow them to legally adopt him. He and his half-brother were led to believe the Dents were their biological parents, until he was ten years old. Dent was told the woman he knew as his aunt was in fact his mother. Later in life, his mother finally told him the name of his father, Russell "Shorty" Stanford, whom he then found, thus sparking and developing a relationship. Dent, furious at his mother for keeping secret his father's identity all those years, stopped speaking with her.

== Playing career ==
=== Early career ===
Dent grew up in Sylvania, Georgia, and Hialeah, Florida, graduating from Hialeah High School.

The Chicago White Sox selected Dent in the first round, with the sixth overall selection, in the 1970 MLB draft. He made his MLB debut in 1973. His best season with the White Sox was in 1975 when he batted .264, led American League shortstops with a .981 fielding percentage and was selected as a reserve for the MLB All-Star Game. After his $50,000-a-year contract expired at the conclusion of the 1976 campaign, he rejected the White Sox's three-year $500,000 offer. His agent Nick Buoniconti explained, "It's obvious that the White Sox can't afford Dent. He is one of the best shortstops in the American League, and he should be paid like one."

The White Sox traded Dent to the New York Yankees for Oscar Gamble, LaMarr Hoyt, minor league pitcher Bob Polinsky and $250,000 on April 5, 1977. He signed a three-year $600,000 contract upon his arrival. For the Yankees, Dent was an upgrade over Fred Stanley, the starting shortstop the previous year. The Yankees assigned him uniform number 20. In his first year with the team, they went on to win the World Series. In his second year, repeated as baseball champions.

=== 1978 ===
In 1978, Dent is widely remembered for hitting a three-run home run that gave the Yankees a 3–2 lead in the AL East division tie-breaker game against the Boston Red Sox. This was all the more remarkable because Dent was not a power hitter; his seventh-inning home run was one of only 40 he hit in his entire 12-year career. Further, Dent occupied the ninth spot in the batting order, not generally considered a power slot, and did it with a bat borrowed from center fielder Mickey Rivers. The Yankees went on to win the game 5–4 for the division title; Boston was left out of the playoffs, after squandering one of the largest July leads in major league history. Generations of Red Sox fans have since referred to him as "Bucky Fucking Dent".

Dent continued his unusually high production by batting .417 (10–24, 7 RBI) in the World Series, earning Series Most Valuable Player honors, as the Yankees again defeated the Los Angeles Dodgers in six games.

=== 1979–1984 ===
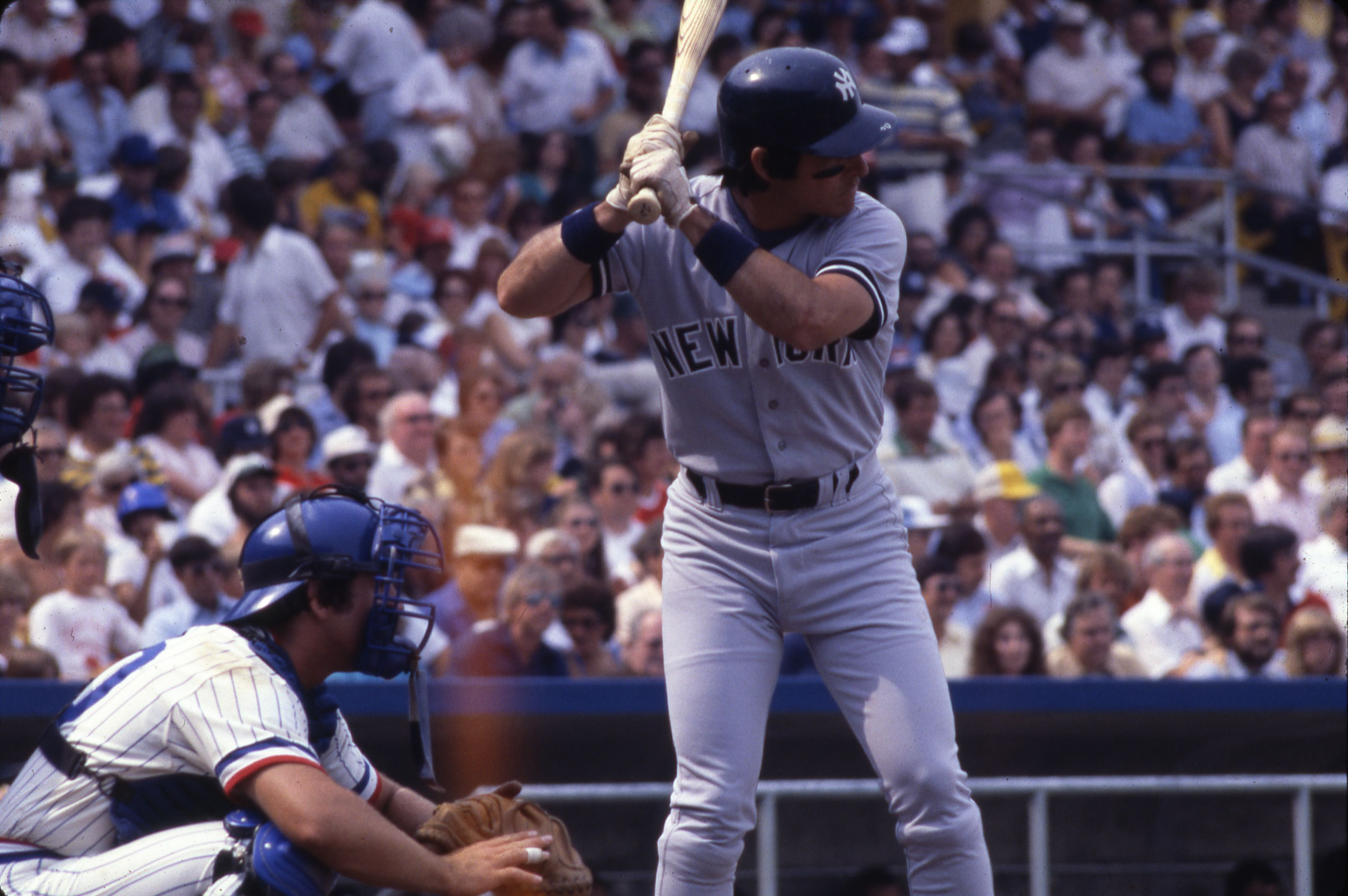
Dent at bat at for the New York Yankees in 1979

A three-time All-Star, Dent remained the Yankees' shortstop until 1982, when he was traded to the Texas Rangers in August for outfielder Lee Mazzilli. During his six years with the Yankees, Dent lived in Wyckoff, New Jersey, in a home he later rented to Don Zimmer.

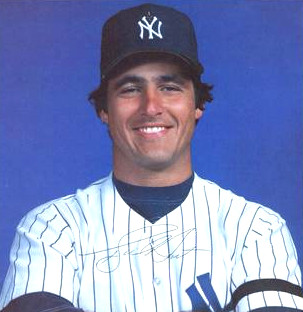
Dent in 1981

On the Rangers, his uniform number was 7. Dent returned to the Yankees briefly in 1984 (but never played a game) before finishing his career that season with the Kansas City Royals, wearing uniform number 21. He spent his entire 12-year playing career in the American League, with a .247 batting average and 423 RBI.

Tommy John observed that Dent's throwing arm was not the strongest and that his range was limited. In spite of that, he was extremely reliable on balls he was able to get to. "He knew how to position himself, and he got to balls that were missed by other shortstops with better range," John said, adding that the player "was kind of taken for granted, until the Yankees unloaded him and discovered what he meant to the infield".

== Post-career activities ==
After retiring as a player, Dent managed in the Yankees' minor-league system, notably with the Columbus Clippers. He served the Yankees as manager of the big-league club for portions of two seasons, compiling an 18–22 record in 1989 and an 18–31 record in 1990. Owner George Steinbrenner hired Dent only as a stopgap, and did not believe he could lead the Yankees back to postseason play. He intended to replace Dent with Billy Martin at the earliest opportunity in 1990, but those plans were undone when Martin died in a car accident on Christmas Day in 1989.

In 1989 Dent opened a baseball school at Delray Beach, Florida, which featured a miniature version of Fenway Park. Although Dent had his greatest moment as a player at Fenway Park, his worst moment also came at Fenway Park when he was fired as manager of the Yankees. Dan Shaughnessy of The Boston Globe criticized Steinbrenner for firing Dent in Boston and said he should "have waited until the Yankees got to Baltimore" to fire Dent. He said that "if Dent had been fired in Seattle or Milwaukee, this would have been just another event in an endless line of George's jettisons. But it happened in Boston and the nightly news had its hook". He also said that "the firing was only special because...it's the first time a Yankee manager...was purged on the ancient Indian burial grounds of the Back Bay". Bill Pennington called the firing of Dent "merciless." Yankees' television analyst Tony Kubek blasted Steinbrenner for the firing. At the beginning of the broadcast of the game on MSG Network, he said to Yankees television play-by-play announcer Dewayne Staats, "George Steinbrenner...mishandled this. You don't take a Bucky Dent (at) the site of one of the greatest home runs in Yankee history and fire him and make it a media circus for the Boston Red Sox." He then stared defiantly on camera and said to Steinbrenner, "You don't do it by telephone, either, George. You do it face to face, eyeball to eyeball...If you really are a winner, you should not have handled this like a loser," adding angrily, "George, you're a bully and a coward." Kubek continued: "What all this does, it just wrecks George Steinbrenner's credibility with his players, with the front office and in baseball more than it already is–if that's possible. It was just mishandled." The firing of Dent shook New York to its core and the Yankees flagship radio station then, WABC, which also criticized the firing, ran editorials demanding that Steinbrenner sell the team.

From 1991 to 1994, Dent served on the coaching staff of the St. Louis Cardinals under manager Joe Torre, moving to the coaching staff of the Texas Rangers from 1995 to 2001.

In 2002, Dent served as the manager for the Omaha Royals, the Triple A affiliate of the Kansas City Royals.

In 2003, when the Green Monster seats were added to Fenway Park, Dent attended the first game and sat in a Green Monster seat that was very near to where his 1978 home run landed. No animosity was displayed towards him by Red Sox fans at that game, who were all cordial to him.

Dent threw out the first pitch to Yogi Berra before the seventh and final game of the 2004 American League Championship Series.

In November 2005, Dent became the bench coach for the Cincinnati Reds. The Cincinnati Reds released Dent on July 3, 2007, days after releasing manager Jerry Narron. At the time, the Reds had the worst record in Major League Baseball.

Every year, ESPN hosts a company softball game named after Dent in Central Park, New York City.

In March, 2020 he began hosting a podcast, Deep to Left with Bucky Dent.

== Managerial record ==
Team	Year	Regular season					Postseason			
Team	Year	Games	Won	Lost	Win %	Finish	Won	Lost	Win %	Result
NYY	1989	40	18	22	.450	5th in AL East	–	–	–	–
NYY	1990	49	18	31	.367	fired	–	–	–	–
Total		89	36	53	.404		0	0	–	

== Non-baseball work ==
In 1979, Dent posed for a pin-up poster. That year he also appeared in the TV movie Dallas Cowboys Cheerleaders, portraying a wide receiver who was the love interest of one of the cheerleaders. He also appeared in the September 1983 issue of Playgirl magazine wearing a swimsuit.

In 2014, Dent made a cameo as a father in the feature film Walt Before Mickey.

== Personal life ==
Dent lives in Bradenton, Florida, with his wife, Angie Aberson, with whom he eloped in November 2019.

His second wife, Mary Ann, died on October 22, 2015; they were the parents of twin children, Cody and Caitlin. He also has two children with his first wife, Karen “Stormie” Neale, Scott and Stacy. That marriage ended in divorce.

One of his daughters, Caitlin, played softball at North Carolina State from 2010 to 2013, and was an assistant coach for the Hofstra softball team during the 2015 season, while Cody Dent played baseball at Florida.

== See also ==
- List of St. Louis Cardinals coaches

Sporting positions
Preceded by Barry Foote	Fort Lauderdale Yankees manager 1985–1986	Succeeded by Buck Showalter
Preceded by Barry Foote	Columbus Clippers manager 1987–1989	Succeeded by Rick Down
Preceded by Rich Hacker	St. Louis Cardinals third base coach 1991–1994	Succeeded by Gaylen Pitts
Preceded by Jackie Moore	Texas Rangers bench coach 1995–2001	Succeeded by Terry Francona
Preceded by John Mizerock	Omaha Royals manager 2002	Succeeded by Mike Jirschele
Preceded by Stump Merrill	Columbus Clippers manager 2003–2005	Succeeded by Dave Miley
Preceded by John Moses	Cincinnati Reds bench coach 2006–2007	Succeeded by Pat Kelly
