= Fort Lauderdale Yankees =

- 1962–1993; Fort Lauderdale, Florida

Minor league affiliations
- Class: Class A-Advanced (1990–1993); Class A (1963–1989); Class D (1962)
- League: Florida State League (1962–1993)

Major league affiliations
- Previous teams: Boston Red Sox (1993); New York Yankees (1962–1992)

Minor league titles
- League titles (7): 1962; 1964; 1965; 1980; 1982; 1984; 1987

Team data
- Name: Fort Lauderdale Red Sox (1993); Fort Lauderdale Yankees (1962–1992)
- Ballpark: Fort Lauderdale Stadium

The Fort Lauderdale Yankees, based in Fort Lauderdale, Florida, were an American Minor League Baseball franchise that existed from 1962 through 1992. The team was a member of the Florida State League (FSL) as an affiliate of the New York Yankees and won seven FSL championships during its 31 years of existence.

The team was formed when the Yankees moved their spring training base from St. Petersburg, Florida, to Fort Lauderdale Stadium after the 1961 season. Its last championship team, in 1987, was managed by Buck Showalter and featured future Major Leaguers Jim Leyritz, Kevin Maas and Dave Eiland.

When the Yankees left Fort Lauderdale for their new spring training home in Tampa, Florida, in 1993, the parent club maintained its other High-A affiliate, the Prince William Yankees of the Carolina League, and left the FSL for one season — returning in 1994 with the Tampa Yankees. The Boston Red Sox transferred their Winter Haven club to Fort Lauderdale Stadium for 1993 as the Fort Lauderdale Red Sox.

When the spring training relationship with Winter Haven ended, Boston tried to move its FSL franchise to its new spring training stadium, Fort Myers' City of Palms Park, but the shift was blocked by the established Fort Myers Miracle, a Minnesota Twins FSL affiliate that played in nearby Hammond Stadium. While the Red Sox and the Miracle ownership tried to resolve the impasse, Boston needed a 1993 venue for its displaced Winter Haven franchise. Fort Lauderdale Stadium was available.

As events turned out, the Red Sox/Miracle territorial dispute never permitted Boston to place its FSL team in Fort Myers. Instead, Boston moved the Fort Lauderdale Red Sox to Sarasota, Florida in 1994 and operated the Sarasota Red Sox there for eleven seasons before departing the Florida State League in 2005. The Red Sox' parent company, Fenway Sports Group, eventually owned and operated its own High Class A farm club, the Salem Red Sox, in the Carolina League.

The Red Sox' one year in Fort Lauderdale was an athletic and economic disappointment. The team, managed by DeMarlo Hale (later the Red Sox' bench coach), compiled the worst record in the FSL at 46–85 (.351), 32 1/2 games out of first place. It drew 28,000 fans, second last in the league and almost 73,000 fans fewer than the 1992 Fort Lauderdale Yankees team. (It still out-paced the 1992 Winter Haven Red Sox entry, which attracted only 16,000 fans in its lame-duck season). Of the 40-plus players who suited up for the Fort Lauderdale Red Sox, only Shayne Bennett, Alex Delgado, Peter Hoy, Ryan McGuire and Lou Merloni would see Major League service.

Fort Lauderdale has not been represented in the Florida State League since 1993. Although the Baltimore Orioles eventually replaced the Yankees as Fort Lauderdale's spring training tenants, they never placed an FSL franchise in the city.

== The Ballpark ==
For the duration of their existence, the Yankees played their home games at Fort Lauderdale Stadium located at 1401 NW 55th Street. The stadium doubled as the spring training home of the parent New York Yankees. Fort Lauderdale Stadium was demolished in 2019.

== Notable alumni ==
Hall of Fame Alumni

- Bobby Cox (1971, MGR) Inducted, 2014
- Rickey Henderson (1985) Inducted, 2009
- Mariano Rivera (1992) Inducted, 2019

Notable alumni

- Steve Balboni (1979)
- Jay Buhner (1985)
- Carl Everett (1992)
- Cesar Geronimo (1968)
- Ron Guidry (1972, 1988) 1978 AL Cy Young Award
- LaMarr Hoyt (1975) 1983 AL Cy Young Award
- Scott McGregor (1972)
- Willie McGee (1978) 2 × NL Batting Champion (1985, 1990)
- Bobby Murcer (1985)
- Buck Showalter (1977, 1987)
- Bob Tewksbury (1982)
- José Rijo (1983)
- Scott Norris (1975)
- Deion Sanders (1988)
- Bernie Williams (1987)

== Year-by-year record ==
Year	Record	Finish	Manager	Playoffs
1962	71–50	1st	Bob Bauer	League Champs
1963	60–60	4th	Pinky May (22–19) / Steve Souchock (7–13) / Cloyd Boyer (31–28)	
1964	81–59	2nd	Frank Verdi	League Champs
1965	87–51	1st	Jack Reed	League Champs
1966	63–75	7th	Lamar North	
1967	69–69	4th	Billy Shantz	
1968	62–75	7th	Billy Shantz	
1969	68–55	4th	Billy Shantz	
1970	59–76	10th	Lamar North	
1971	71–70	6th (t)	Bobby Cox	
1972	64–65	7th	Pete Ward	
1973	67–72	7th	Pete Ward	
1974	82–49	1st	Pete Ward	Lost League Finals
1975	61–75	5th (t)	Leo Posada	
1976	77–62	3rd	Mike Ferraro	Lost in 1st round
1977	53–80	9th	Ed Napoleon	
1978	74–68	5th	Doug Holmquist	
1979	92–51	1st	Doug Holmquist	Lost League Finals
1980	83–54	2nd	Doug Holmquist	League Champs
1981	81–53	1st	Doug Holmquist	Lost in 1st round
1982	82–50	1st	Stump Merrill	League Champs
1983	77–54	2nd	Stump Merrill	
1984	74–68	5th	Barry Foote	League Champs
1985	77–63	4th	Bucky Dent	Lost League Finals
1986	80–59	5th	Bucky Dent	
1987	85–53	1st	Buck Showalter	League Champs
1988	69–65	9th	Buck Showalter	
1989	61–77	11th	Clete Boyer	
1990	62–75	9th	Mike Hart	
1991	59–69	11th	Glenn Sherlock	
1992	59–76	10th	Brian Butterfield	
1993	46-85	4th	DeMarlo Hale	
