= Dan Radison =

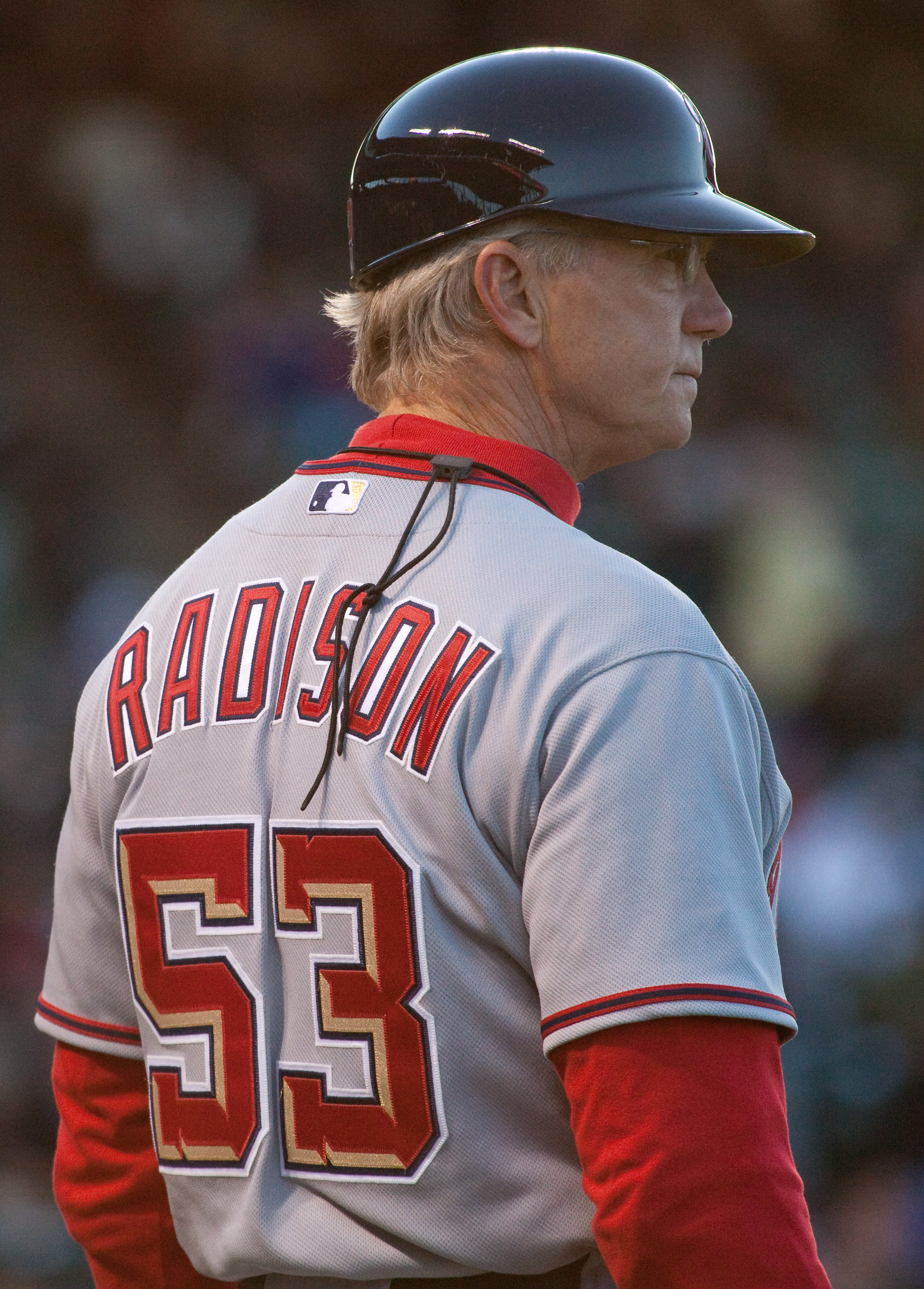
- Radison in 2010
- Coach
- Born: August 24, 1950 (age 75); St. Louis, Missouri, U.S.
- Bats: Right Throws: Right

Teams
- As coach: San Diego Padres (1993–1994); Chicago Cubs (1995–1999); Washington Nationals (2010–2011); Houston Astros (2012–2013)

Daniel John Radison (born August 24, 1950) is an American former professional baseball coach. A former minor league catcher, he has also been a Major League Baseball (MLB) coach for the San Diego Padres, Chicago Cubs and Washington Nationals. Radison batted and threw right-handed as a player, and was listed at 6 feet 2 inches (1.88 m) tall and weighing 180 pounds (82 kg).

Radison played shortstop and catcher for his high school squad in Columbia, Illinois. One of Radison's teammates was Jim Kremmel, who later pitched in the majors with the Chicago Cubs. In 1970, he played collegiate summer baseball for the Harwich Mariners of the Cape Cod Baseball League (CCBL) and was named a league all-star. He returned to the CCBL to play for the Orleans Cardinals the following season. After high school, Radison attended Southern Illinois University, where he earned all-tournament honors in the 1971 College World Series.

Radison played for three seasons (1972–74) in the Cardinal farm system before becoming an assistant coach at the U.S. college level from 1977 to 1983 with Broward Community College, the University of Georgia and Old Dominion University. In 1984, he returned to professional baseball as a manager in the farm system of the New York Mets, spending two years with them before rejoining the Cardinals as a minor league pilot in 1986. He has also been a manager in the New York Yankees system, piloting the Albany-Colonie Yankees (1990–92) and Norwich Navigators (2000), the Yanks' Double-A Eastern League affiliates.

In between, Radison coached in MLB working under Jim Riggleman — like Radison, a veteran of the Cardinal system — with the Padres (1993–94) and Cubs (1995–99). From 2000 to 2009, he was a minor league manager and roving coach for the Yankees and Cardinals. His career minor league managing record is 622–552 (.530), with two championships. On November 20, 2009, he was appointed first-base coach of the Washington Nationals by newly named permanent manager Jim Riggleman.

In 2012, Radison joined the Houston Astros as a special assistant in the player development department. Radison was named interim first base coach for the Astros on August 19, 2012, and was named the Astros' assistant hitting coach in 2013. From 2015 to 2016, Radison was the hitting coach for the Corpus Christi Hooks, the Astros' Double-A affiliate.

Sporting positions
Preceded by Buck Showalter	Albany-Colonie Yankees Manager; 1990-1992	Succeeded by Mike Hart
Preceded by Lee Mazzilli	Norwich Navigators Manager; 2000	Succeeded by Stump Merrill
Preceded by Marquis Grissom	Washington Nationals First Base Coach; 2010	Succeeded by Trent Jewett
Preceded by Bobby Meacham	Houston Astros First Base Coach; 2012	Succeeded by Dave Clark
