= Stump Merrill =

American baseball coach and manager (born 1944)

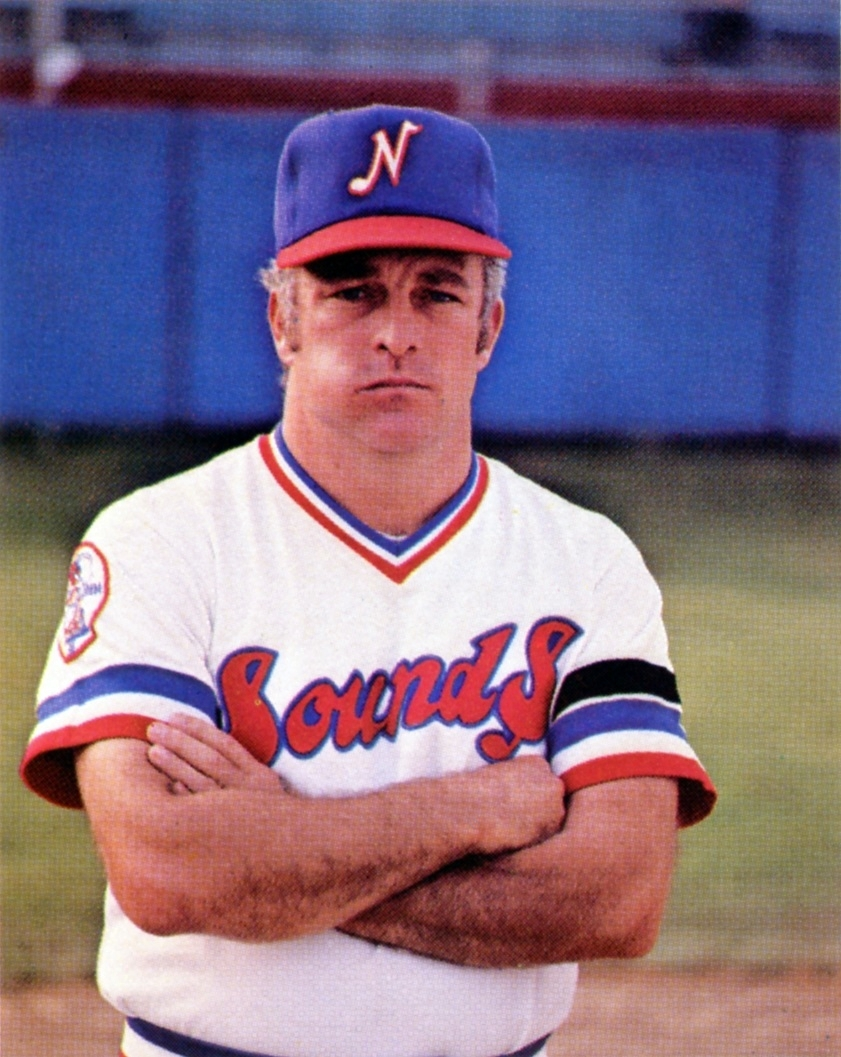
- Merrill with the Nashville Sounds in 1980
- Manager
- Born: February 15, 1944 (age 81); Brunswick, Maine, U.S.
- Bats: Left Throws: Right

MLB statistics
- Games managed: 275
- Win–loss record: 120–155
- Winning %: .436
- Managerial record at Baseball Reference

Teams
- As manager: New York Yankees (1990–1991); As coach: New York Yankees (1985, 1987)

Carl Harrison "Stump" Merrill (born February 15, 1944) is an American former manager in Major League Baseball (MLB). Merrill spent 38 years in the New York Yankees organization, including 1990 and 1991 as the manager of the Yankees, and he also managed several of the Yankees' minor league affiliates.

== Early life ==
Merrill was born in 1944 in Brunswick, Maine. He graduated from Brunswick High School, where he was a star in baseball, basketball, and football despite being considered undersized.

== Baseball career ==
=== As a player ===
Merrill was listed as 5 feet 8 inches (1.73 m) tall and 185 pounds (84 kg); he batted left-handed and threw right-handed.

He began his baseball career as a catcher for the Maine Black Bears, where he also played football and earned a degree in physical education. He was selected by the Philadelphia Phillies in the 1966 free-agent draft. He spent that season in the class-A New York–Penn League with the Batavia Clippers, and the following year with single-A teams in Bakersfield and Eugene. In 1968 and 1969, Merrill was at the double-A level with the Reading Phillies, and returned to Eugene in 1970 and 1971 while that team was at the triple-A level. His playing career ended after the 1971 season due to a leg injury.

=== As a manager ===
Merrill's managerial career started in 1978 with the West Haven Yankees of the Eastern League. He led the team to the best overall record in the league that season, and to a first-place finish in 1979. When the Yankees moved their affiliation to the Nashville Sounds, Merrill moved as well, guiding the team to two more first-place finishes in 1980 and 1981.

In 1982 and 1983, Merrill managed the Fort Lauderdale Yankees of the Florida State League, winning the league championship in 1982. For the 1984 season, he jumped to the triple-A level, managing the Columbus Clippers to another first-place finish.

Merrill joined the New York Yankees in 1985 as first-base coach for manager Yogi Berra, but was returned to Columbus in mid-season to again serve as that team's manager. He rejoined the major-league team in 1986 as a coach on Lou Piniella's staff.

During the 1988 season, Merrill was sent to the Albany-Colonie Yankees, then the team's double-A affiliate in the Eastern League. He won the league title that season, and did so yet again in 1989, guiding the Prince William Cannons to the Class A Carolina League championship.

In 1990, Merrill began the season with Columbus before getting a call to take charge of the New York Yankees in June when Bucky Dent was fired as manager. Merrill finished out what would be one of the worst seasons in Yankees franchise history, which saw those Yankees finish at 67-95 (49-64 under Merrill), dead last in the American League and second-worst in all of baseball. It was only the fourth time the storied franchise had finished with the worst record in the league. However, Merrill was not blamed for the debacle and was brought back for the 1991 season—the first time in four years where the Yankees had a single manager for the entire season. However, after the Yankees could only improve to 71–91, he was replaced by Buck Showalter prior to the 1992 season and served that season as a roving minor-league instructor.

During 1993 and 1994, Merrill once again managed the Columbus Clippers before spending 1995 as a special assignment scout. In 1996, Merrill guided the Clippers for a third time, winning the International League title, the Governors' Cup. Along the way, Merrill won his 1000th game as a manager on August 2, 1996. He remained with the Clippers for the 1997 and 1998 seasons before returning to New York.

In 1999 and 2000, Merrill had a two-year stint as special assistant to the general manager under Brian Cashman. He returned to the dugout in 2001 to manage the Yankees' double-A farm club, then the Norwich Navigators. When the Yankees changed affiliations after the 2002 season, Merrill moved with the team once more, managing the Trenton Thunder in 2003 and 2004.

Merrill returned to New York in 2005 and was once again named special assistant to the general manager. He retired in 2014.

=== Managerial record ===
Team	Year	Regular season					Postseason			
Team	Year	Games	Won	Lost	Win %	Finish	Won	Lost	Win %	Result
NYY	1990	113	49	64	.434	7th in AL East	–	–	–	–
NYY	1991	162	71	91	.438	5th in AL East (fired)	–	–	–	–
Total		275	120	155	.436		0	0	.000	

== Nickname ==
Merrill's nickname, "Stump," was given to him in 1963 by Jack Butterfield, his college baseball coach at Maine. Merrill recalled of the coining: "In my freshman year, we were walking out of the field house. I was with a tall pitcher who was about 6-foot-5. Just as we were outside, Jack Butterfield was trying to get my attention. He hollered at me three or four times and I didn't hear him. Finally he said, 'Hey Stump you little devil, turn around.' The pitcher heard it, and I guess it stuck."

Sporting positions
Preceded by Mike Ferraro	West Haven Yankees Manager; 1978–1979	Succeeded by became Nashville Sounds
Preceded by were the West Haven Yankees	Nashville Sounds Manager; 1980–1981	Succeeded by Johnny Oates
Preceded by Doug Holmquist	Fort Lauderdale Yankees Manager; 1982–83	Succeeded by Jim Marshall
Preceded by Johnny Oates	Columbus Clippers Manager; 1984	Succeeded by Doug Holmquist
Preceded by Lou Piniella	New York Yankees First Base Coach; 1985	Succeeded by Doug Holmquist
Preceded by Doug Holmquist	Columbus Clippers Manager; 1985	Succeeded by Barry Foote
Preceded by Roy White	New York Yankees First Base Coach; 1987	Succeeded by Mike Ferraro
Preceded by Tommy Jones	Albany-Colonie Yankees Manager; 1988	Succeeded by Buck Showalter
Preceded by Mark Weidemaier	Prince William Cannons Manager; 1989	Succeeded by Gary Denbo
Preceded by Rick Down	Columbus Clippers Manager; 1990	Succeeded by Rick Down
Preceded by Bucky Dent	New York Yankees Manager; 1990–1991	Succeeded by Buck Showalter
Preceded by Rick Down	Columbus Clippers Manager; 1993–1994	Succeeded by Bill Evers
Preceded by Bill Evers	Columbus Clippers Manager; 1996–1999	Succeeded by Trey Hillman
Preceded by Dan Radison	Norwich Navigators Manager; 2001–2002	Succeeded by Luis Sojo
Preceded by Frank Howard	Columbus Clippers Manager; 2002	Succeeded by Bucky Dent
Preceded by previously Red Sox affiliate	Trenton Thunder Manager; 2003–2004	Succeeded by Bill Masse
