= Lee Mazzilli =

American baseball player and manager (born 1955)

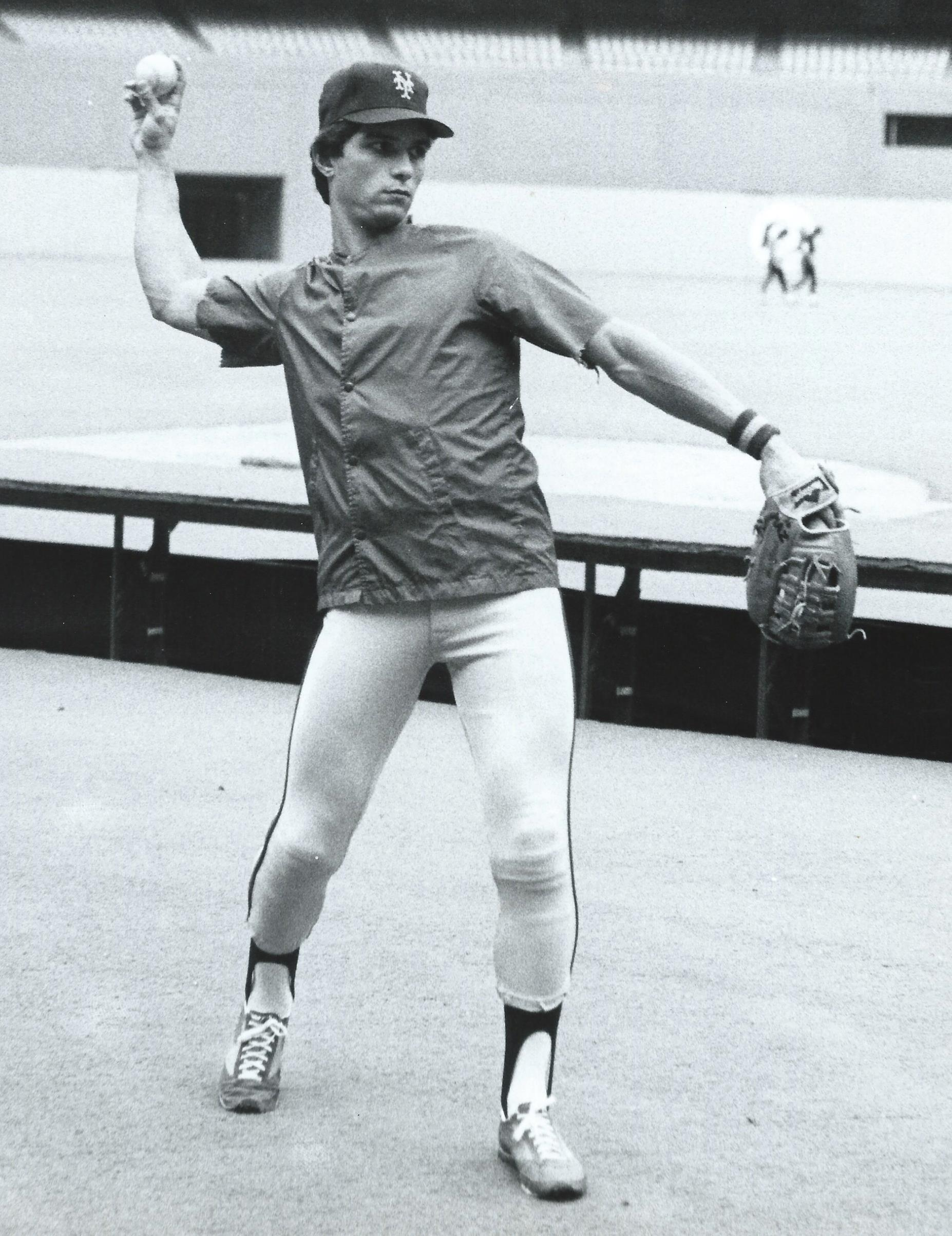
- Mazzilli with the Mets in 1978
- Center fielder / First baseman
- Born: March 25, 1955 (age 71); Brooklyn, New York, U.S.
- Batted: Switch Threw: Right

MLB debut
- September 7, 1976, for the New York Mets

Last MLB appearance
- September 29, 1989, for the Toronto Blue Jays

MLB statistics
- Batting average: .259
- Home runs: 93
- Runs batted in: 460
- Managerial record: 129–140
- Winning %: .480
- Stats at Baseball Reference
- Managerial record at Baseball Reference

Teams
- As player: New York Mets (1976–1981); Texas Rangers (1982); New York Yankees (1982); Pittsburgh Pirates (1983–1986); New York Mets (1986–1989); Toronto Blue Jays (1989); As manager: Baltimore Orioles (2004–2005); As coach: New York Yankees (2000–2003, 2006)

Career highlights and awards
- All-Star (1979); 2× World Series champion (1986, 2000); New York Mets Hall of Fame

Lee Louis Mazzilli (born March 25, 1955) is an American former professional baseball player, coach, and manager. He played in Major League Baseball (MLB) as an outfielder for the New York Mets, Texas Rangers, New York Yankees, Pittsburgh Pirates, and Toronto Blue Jays from 1976 through 1989. He was an MLB All-Star in 1979. Mazzilli also managed the Baltimore Orioles from 2004 through 2005 and coached the Yankees from 2000 through 2003 and in 2006.

== Early years ==
An excellent athlete, Mazzilli was the son of welterweight boxer Libero Mazzilli and his wife, June. Unlike most switch hitters, who naturally bat from one side of the plate and train themselves to feel comfortable on the other, Mazzilli was naturally ambidextrous, and swung the bat both ways from an early age. The sport he most excelled in as a junior was speed skating, in which he won eight national championships. He graduated from Brooklyn's Lincoln High School in 1973, and was the first round selection (14th pick overall) of the hometown New York Mets in the 1973 Major League Baseball draft.

== Playing career ==
Mazzilli was quite popular in New York City, thanks not only to his talent, but his Brooklyn roots and matinée idol looks. While in the minor leagues, Mazzilli set a California League record (and what is believed to be a professional record) when he stole seven bases in a game for the Mets' minor league affiliate Visalia against San Jose on June 8, 1975.

In 1979, Mazzilli had his best statistical season, and led the Mets with 4.7 fWAR, 137 WRC+, 181 hits and 79 runs batted in, 93 walks against only 74 strikeouts, and was one of their two representatives at the All-Star Game in Seattle (the other being catcher John Stearns). Mazzilli hit a game-tying solo home run in the eighth inning of that All-Star Game, and drew a bases-loaded walk in the ninth inning to bring in the winning run of the National League's 7–6 victory. The following year, he had his second best statistical season, leading the Mets with 162 hits, 31 doubles, 16 home runs, 76 RBIs, 82 runs, and 41 stolen bases. He also accumulated 3.3 fWAR that season, alongside 127 WRC+. He was the only Met to have 2 RBI's in an All Star Game until 2019 when Pete Alonso did so.

After a 1981 season in which he hit only .228 and was hampered by injuries to his back and elbow, Mazzilli was traded from the Mets to the Texas Rangers for Ron Darling and Walt Terrell on April 1, 1982. He had lost the right fielder competition to Ellis Valentine and Joel Youngblood. He batted .269 with 61 home runs in his five years with the Mets. Mazzilli played only 58 games with Texas and was traded to the New York Yankees for Bucky Dent midway through the 1982 season. Prior to the 1983 season, Mazzilli was traded to the Pittsburgh Pirates for Tim Burke, Don Aubin, John Holland, and Jose Rivera.

=== Re-signing with the Mets ===
The Mets were early favorites to reach the post-season in 1986, and prior to the start of the season offered third baseman Ray Knight to the Pirates for Mazzilli. The Pirates turned them down. The Pirates released him in July 1986, and he re-signed with the Mets on August 3.

Upon signing with the Mets, Mazzilli was assigned to their triple-A affiliate, the Tidewater Tides. This was his first tour of duty with the Tides as he had made the jump to the major leagues from double-A. On August 7, the Mets released left fielder George Foster and called Mazzilli up to the majors. Foster was very critical of this move by the Mets, and accused his former employers of racism.

Mazzilli turned out to be an important part of their championship team. His career with the Mets continued until 1989 when he was claimed by the Toronto Blue Jays on waivers. Mazzilli retired after the 1989 season, his 14th in the major leagues.

His final major league at bat came on September 29, 1989 when the Toronto Blue Jays were hosting the Baltimore Orioles. There was a great deal of attention paid to the game, as it was the middle game of a three-game series that would decide the winner of the American League East. The Baltimore Orioles had beaten even the most optimistic expectations and were in first place for much of the 1989 season. Baltimore needed to win three games against Toronto to enter post-season play. Baltimore had lost the first game. In Mazzilli's final at bat, during the second game, he singled to center field.

In 14 major league seasons covering 1,475 games, Mazzilli batted .259 (1068-for-4124) with 93 home runs and 460 RBI.

== Pittsburgh drug trials ==
Mazzilli and Pirates teammates Dale Berra, Lee Lacy, John Milner and Dave Parker, along with several other notable major league players, were called before a Pittsburgh grand jury for their involvement in the Pittsburgh cocaine distribution trial of Curtis Strong. Their testimony led to the drug trials, which made national headlines in September 1985. He and the other players brought before the Pittsburgh Grand Jury were granted immunity from prosecution in exchange for testimony.

== Acting career ==
At the end of his career, Mazzilli took up acting, starring as Tony in an off-Broadway production of Tony n' Tina's Wedding.

== Managing/coaching career ==
Mazzilli was manager of the Norwich Navigators for the 1999 season, the Double-A affiliate for the New York Yankess in Norwich, CT. They finished second in the Northern Division with a record of 78 wins and 64 losses under Mazzilli. Mazzilli was next manager of the Baltimore Orioles from 2004 until August 4, 2005. The 2005 team compiled a surprising record of 42 wins and 30 losses while spending 62 days in first place in AL East. Its subsequent losing streak led to Mazzilli's firing. He was first base coach to the New York Yankees from 2000 to 2003 and bench coach in 2006.

=== Managerial record ===
Team	Year	Regular season					Postseason			
Team	Year	Games	Won	Lost	Win %	Finish	Won	Lost	Win %	Result
BAL	2004	162	78	84	.481	3rd in AL East	–	–	–	–
BAL	2005	107	51	56	.477	fired	–	–	–	–
Total		269	129	140	.480		0	0	–	

== Broadcasting ==
On December 11, 2006, he was hired as a studio analyst for Sportsnet New York. He was replaced by Bob Ojeda prior to the 2009 season.

== Family ==
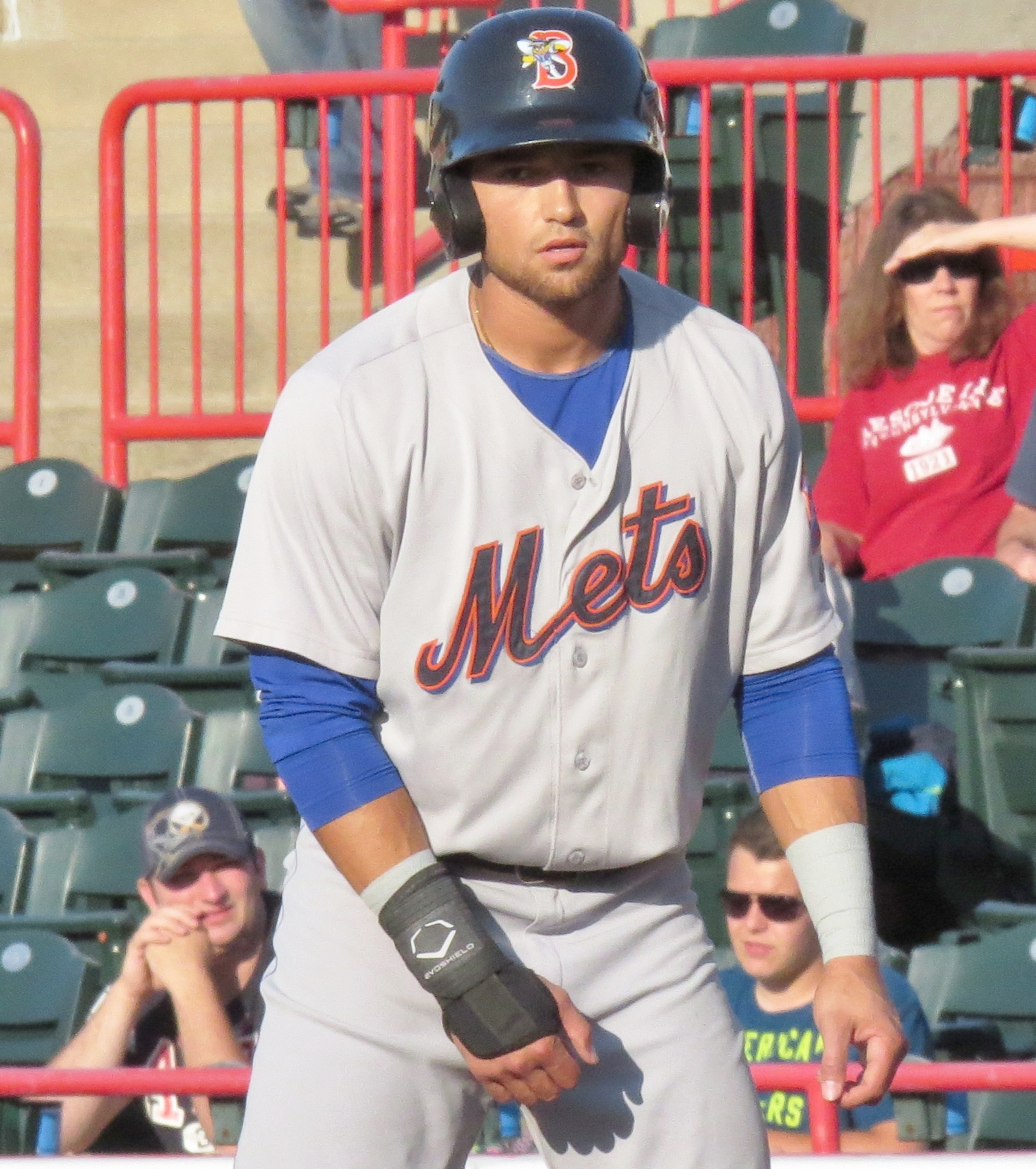
L. J. Mazzilli with the Binghamton Mets in 2015

Mazzilli's brother Fredo introduced him in 1981 to Danielle Folquet, a host of the New York City edition of PM Magazine. They were married at St. Patrick's Cathedral on February 4, 1984. The Mazzillis have three children: Jenna, Lacey, and Lee Jr. (known as L.J.) L.J. was drafted by the New York Mets in the fourth round of the 2013 Major League Baseball draft after playing for the University of Connecticut.

== See also ==
- List of Major League Baseball career stolen bases leaders

Sporting positions
Preceded by Trey Hillman	Tampa Yankees Manager; 1997–1998	Succeeded by Tom Nieto
Preceded by Trey Hillman	Norwich Navigators Manager; 1999	Succeeded by Dan Radison
Preceded by José Cardenal	New York Yankees First Base Coach; 2000–2003	Succeeded by Roy White
Preceded by Joe Girardi	New York Yankees Bench Coach; 2006	Succeeded by Don Mattingly
