= Doug Holmquist =

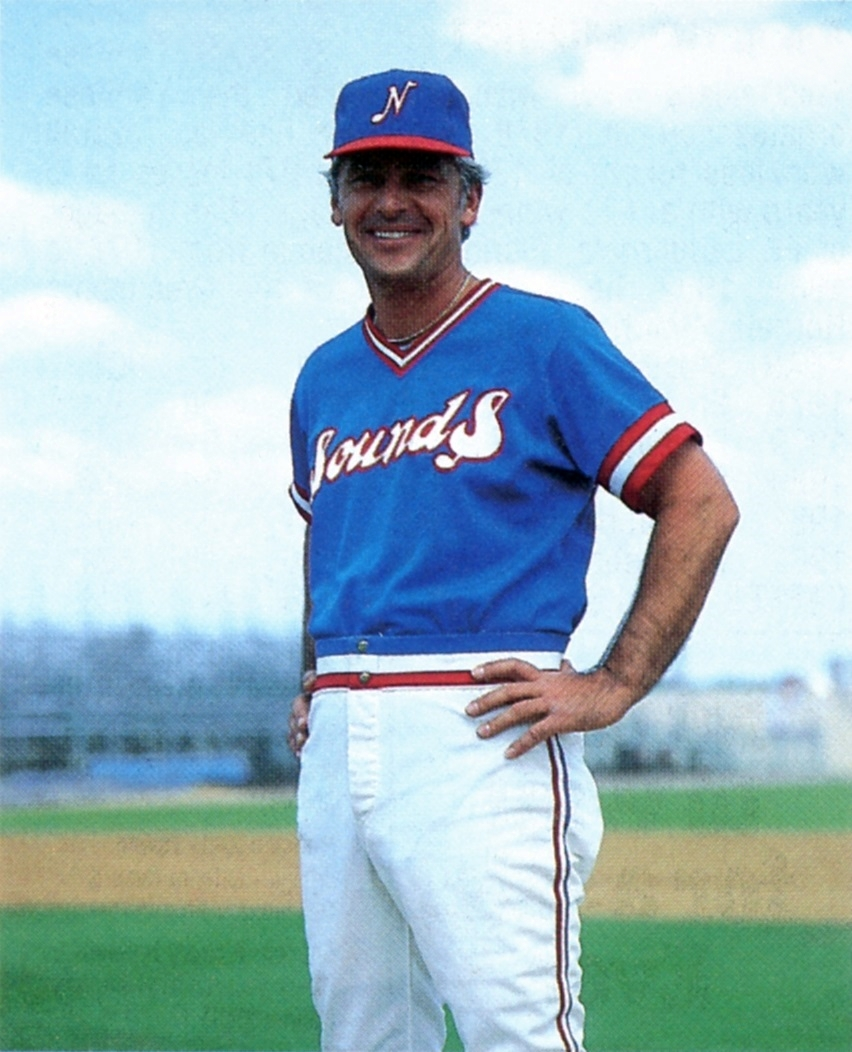
- Holmquist as the manager of the Nashville Sounds in 1983
- First base coach
- Born: October 4, 1941; Bridgeport, Connecticut, U.S.
- Died: February 27, 1988 (aged 46); Orlando, Florida, U.S.
- Batted: Right Threw: Right
- Stats at Baseball Reference

Teams
- As coach: New York Yankees (1984–1985)

Douglas Leonard Holmquist (October 4, 1941 – February 27, 1988) was an American minor league baseball player and manager, as well as Major League Baseball coach for the New York Yankees. He played professionally as a catcher from 1962 to 1965, and later managed and/or coached at the professional level from 1978 to 1985. He led his teams to win league championships in 1980 and 1982.

At the collegiate level, Holmquist coached at Sacred Heart University (1968), the University of Vermont (1969 to 1971), and started the baseball program at the Florida Technological University, coaching there from 1973 to 1975. In 1970, he coached collegiate summer baseball in the Cape Cod Baseball League, leading the Chatham Anglers.

His entire seven-year managerial career was spent in the Yankees farm system. He served for four years at their Class A Fort Lauderdale Yankees of the Florida State League, then a year at the Class A Greensboro Hornets of the South Atlantic League, and then a year at their Double-A Nashville Sounds of the Southern League. After sitting out 1984 as skipper, Holmquist returned for a final year in 1985, managing the Triple-A Columbus Clippers of the International League. That year, he managed 22 games before being replaced by Stump Merrill. In 1984 and 1985, he was the first base coach for the major league Yankees, wearing #42. Holmquist died of a heart attack at age 46 in 1988.

Sporting positions
| Preceded by Roy White | New York Yankees First Base Coach; 1984 | Succeeded by Stump Merrill |
| Preceded by Stump Merrill | New York Yankees First Base Coach; 1985 | Succeeded by Roy White |
