= 1992 Boston Red Sox season =

Major League Baseball season

1992 Boston Red Sox
- League: American League
- Division: East
- Ballpark: Fenway Park
- City: Boston, Massachusetts
- Record: 73–89 (.451)
- Divisional place: 7th
- Owners: JRY Trust, Haywood Sullivan
- President: John Harrington
- General manager: Lou Gorman
- Manager: Butch Hobson
- Television: WSBK-TV, Ch. 38 (Sean McDonough, Bob Montgomery); NESN (Ned Martin, Jerry Remy)
- Radio: WRKO (Bob Starr, Joe Castiglione); WROL (Bobby Serrano, Hector Martinez)
- Stats: ESPN.com; Baseball Reference

The 1992 Boston Red Sox season was the 92nd season in the franchise's Major League Baseball history. The Red Sox finished last in the seven-team American League East with a record of 73 wins and 89 losses, 23 games behind the Toronto Blue Jays, who went on to win the 1992 World Series. It was the last time the Red Sox finished last in their division until 2012. From 1933 to 2011, this was the only season the Red Sox finished last in the division.

== Offseason ==
- January 2, 1992: Frank Viola signed as a free agent with the Red Sox.

== Regular season ==
Record by month
Month	Record		Cumulative		AL East		Ref.
Month	Won	Lost	Won	Lost	Position	GB	Ref.
April	9	9	9	9	5th	4 1/2	
May	15	12	24	21	4th	4 1/2	
June	11	17	35	38	5th	8 1/2	
July	13	15	48	53	4th	12 1/2	
August	12	18	60	71	6th (tie)	14 1/2	
September	11	17	71	88	7th	22	
October	2	1	73	89	7th	23	

The Red Sox hit seven grand slams, the most in MLB in 1992.

=== Season standings ===
AL East
Team	W	L	Pct.	GB	Home	Road
Toronto Blue Jays	96	66	.593	—	53‍–‍28	43‍–‍38
Milwaukee Brewers	92	70	.568	4	53‍–‍28	39‍–‍42
Baltimore Orioles	89	73	.549	7	43‍–‍38	46‍–‍35
Cleveland Indians	76	86	.469	20	41‍–‍40	35‍–‍46
New York Yankees	76	86	.469	20	41‍–‍40	35‍–‍46
Detroit Tigers	75	87	.463	21	38‍–‍42	37‍–‍45
Boston Red Sox	73	89	.451	23	44‍–‍37	29‍–‍52

=== Record vs. opponents ===
1992 American League record Sources:
Team	BAL	BOS	CAL	CWS	CLE	DET	KC	MIL	MIN	NYY	OAK	SEA	TEX	TOR
Baltimore	—	8–5	8–4	6–6	7–6	10–3	8–4	6–7	6–6	5–8	6–6	7–5	7–5	5–8
Boston	5–8	—	8–4	6–6	6–7	4–9	7–5	5–8	3–9	7–6	5–7	6–6	4–8	7–6
California	4–8	4–8	—	3–10	6–6	7–5	8–5	5–7	2–11	7–5	5–8	7–6	9–4	5–7
Chicago	6–6	6–6	10–3	—	7–5	10–2	7–6	5–7	8–5	8–4	5–8	4–9	5–8	5–7
Cleveland	6–7	7–6	6–6	5–7	—	5–8	5–7	5–8	6–6	7–6	6–6	7–5	5–7	6–7
Detroit	3–10	9–4	5–7	2–10	8–5	—	7–5	5–8	3–9	5–8	6–6	9–3	8–4	5–8
Kansas City	4–8	5–7	5–8	6–7	7–5	5–7	—	7–5	6–7	5–7	4–9	7–6	6–7	5–7
Milwaukee	7–6	8–5	7–5	7–5	8–5	8–5	5–7	—	6–6	6–7	7–5	8–4	7–5	8–5
Minnesota	6–6	9–3	11–2	5–8	6–6	9–3	7–6	6–6	—	7–5	5–8	8–5	6–7	5–7
New York	8–5	6–7	5–7	4–8	6–7	8–5	7–5	7–6	5–7	—	6–6	6–6	6–6	2–11
Oakland	6–6	7–5	8–5	8–5	6–6	6–6	9–4	5–7	8–5	6–6	—	12–1	9–4	6–6
Seattle	5–7	6–6	6–7	9–4	5–7	3–9	6–7	4–8	5–8	6–6	1–12	—	4–9	4–8
Texas	5–7	8–4	4–9	8–5	7–5	4–8	7–6	5–7	7–6	6–6	4–9	9–4	—	3–9
Toronto	8–5	6–7	7–5	7–5	7–6	8–5	7–5	5–8	7–5	11–2	6–6	8–4	9–3	—

=== Notable transactions ===
- April 16, 1992: Bob Geren was signed as a free agent with the Red Sox.
- June 27, 1992: Steve Lyons was purchased by the Red Sox from the Montreal Expos.
- August 30, 1992: Jeff Reardon was traded by the Red Sox to the Atlanta Braves for Nate Minchey and minor league outfielder Sean Ross.
- October 26, 1992: Wade Boggs was granted free agency by the Red Sox.

=== Opening Day lineup ===
26	Wade Boggs	3B
3	Jody Reed	2B
39	Mike Greenwell	LF
12	Ellis Burks	CF
29	Phil Plantier	RF
25	Jack Clark	DH
42	Mo Vaughn	1B
6	Tony Peña	C
2	Luis Rivera	SS
21	Roger Clemens	P

=== Alumni game ===
The team held an old-timers game on May 16, before a scheduled home game against the California Angels. The game marked the 25th anniversary of the 1967 Boston Red Sox season, known as "The Impossible Dream"; participants from the 1967 team included Mike Andrews, Jim Lonborg, Rico Petrocelli, and Carl Yastrzemski. Red Sox alumni won by a 3–0 score over a team of MLB alumni from other clubs, managed by Harmon Killebrew.

=== Roster ===
1992 Boston Red Sox
Roster
Pitchers: 50 Tom Bolton; 21 Roger Clemens; 44 Danny Darwin; 40 John Dopson; 48 Tony Fossas; 47 Mike Gardiner; 27 Greg Harris; 55 Joe Hesketh; 31 Peter Hoy; 59 Daryl Irvine; 49 Paul Quantrill; 41 Jeff Reardon; 50 Ken Ryan; 56 Scott Taylor; 16 Frank Viola; 30 Matt Young	Catchers: 15 John Flaherty; 20 John Marzano; 6 Tony Peña; Infielders: 33 Tom Barrett; 26 Wade Boggs; 45 Scott Cooper; 19 Steve Lyons; 11 Tim Naehring; 3 Jody Reed; 2 Luis Rivera; 13 John Valentin; 42 Mo Vaughn	Outfielders: 23 Tom Brunansky; 12 Ellis Burks; 39 Mike Greenwell; 22 Billy Hatcher; 29 Phil Plantier; 5 Herm Winningham; 28 Bob Zupcic; Other batters: 10 Mike Brumley; 25 Jack Clark; 22 Eric Wedge	Manager: 17 Butch Hobson; Coaches: 32 Gary Allenson (Bullpen); 37 Al Bumbry (First base); 7 Rick Burleson (Hitting, third base); 35 Rich Gale (Pitching); 34 Don Zimmer (Third base, bench)

== Player stats ==
= Indicates team leader

= Indicates league leader

=== Batting ===
==== Starters by position ====
Note: Pos = Position; G = Games played; AB = At bats; H = Hits; Avg. = Batting average; HR = Home runs; RBI = Runs batted in

Pos.	Player	G	AB	H	Avg.	HR	RBI
C	Tony Peña	133	410	99	.241	1	38
1B	Mo Vaughn	113	355	83	.234	13	57
2B	Jody Reed	143	550	136	.247	3	40
3B	Wade Boggs	143	514	133	.259	7	50
SS	Luis Rivera	102	288	62	.215	0	29
LF	Billy Hatcher	75	315	75	.238	1	23
CF	Bob Zupcic	124	392	108	.276	3	43
RF	Tom Brunansky	138	458	122	.266	15	74
DH	Jack Clark	81	257	54	.210	5	33

==== Other batters ====
Note: G = Games played; AB = At bats; H = Hits; Avg. = Batting average; HR = Home runs; RBI = Runs batted in

Player	G	AB	H	Avg.	HR	RBI
Phil Plantier	108	349	86	.246	7	30
Scott Cooper	123	337	93	.276	5	33
Ellis Burks	66	235	60	.255	8	30
Herm Winningham	105	234	55	.235	1	14
Tim Naehring	72	186	43	.231	3	14
John Valentin	58	185	51	.276	5	25
Mike Greenwell	49	180	42	.233	2	18
Eric Wedge	27	68	17	.250	5	11
John Flaherty	35	66	13	.197	0	2
John Marzano	19	50	4	.080	0	1
Steve Lyons	21	28	7	.250	0	2
Tom Barrett	4	3	0	.000	0	0
Mike Brumley	2	1	0	.000	0	0

=== Pitching ===
==== Starting pitchers ====
Note: G = Games pitched; IP = Innings pitched; W = Wins; L = Losses; ERA = Earned run average; SO = Strikeouts

Player	G	IP	W	L	ERA	SO
Roger Clemens	32	246.2	18	11	2.41	208
Frank Viola	35	238.0	13	12	3.44	121
Joe Hesketh	30	148.2	8	9	4.36	104
John Dopson	25	141.1	7	11	4.08	55

==== Relief and other pitchers ====
Note: G = Games pitched; IP = Innings pitched; W = Wins; L = Losses; ERA = Earned run average; SO = Strikeouts; SV = Saves

Player	G	IP	W	L	ERA	SO	SV
Danny Darwin	51	161.1	9	9	3.96	124	3
Mike Gardiner	28	130.2	4	10	4.75	79	0
Greg Harris	70	107.2	4	9	2.51	73	4
Matt Young	28	70.2	0	4	4.58	57	0
Paul Quantrill	27	49.1	2	3	2.19	24	1
Jeff Reardon	46	42.1	2	2	4.25	32	27
Tony Fossas	60	29.2	1	2	2.43	19	2
Tom Bolton	21	29.0	1	2	3.41	23	0
Daryl Irvine	21	28.0	3	4	6.11	10	0
Scott Taylor	4	14.2	1	1	4.91	7	0
Ken Ryan	7	7.0	0	0	6.43	5	1
Peter Hoy	5	3.2	0	0	7.36	2	0

== Awards and honors ==
Awards

- Roger Clemens, AL Pitcher of the Month (May, August)

Accomplishments

- Roger Clemens, American League Leader, Shutouts (5)

All-Star Game

- Wade Boggs, third base, starter
- Roger Clemens, pitcher, reserve

== Farm system ==
Level	Team	League	Manager
AAA	Pawtucket Red Sox	International League	Rico Petrocelli
AA	New Britain Red Sox	Eastern League	Jim Pankovits
A-Advanced	Lynchburg Red Sox	Carolina League	Buddy Bailey
A-Advanced	Winter Haven Red Sox	Florida State League	Felix Maldonado
A-Short Season	Elmira Pioneers	New York–Penn League	Dave Holt
Rookie	GCL Red Sox	Gulf Coast League	Frank White

== Game log ==
Red Sox Win	Red Sox Loss	Game postponed

1992 Boston Red Sox Season Game Log: 73–89 (Home: 44–37; Away: 29–52)
April: 9–9

#	Date	Opponent	Score	Win	Loss	Save	Stadium	Attendance	Record	Streak
1	April 7	@ Yankees	3–4	Sanderson (1–0)	Clemens (0–1)	Farr (1)	Yankee Stadium	56,572	0–1	L1
2	April 9	@ Yankees	2–3	Monteleone (1–0)	Viola (0–1)	Howe (1)	Yankee Stadium	20,430	0–2	L2
3	April 11	@ Indians	7–5 (19)	Gardiner (1–0)	Bell (0–1)	—	Cleveland Stadium	65,813	1–2	W1
4	April 12 (1)	@ Indians	1–2	Nagy (1–1)	Young (0–1)	Lilliquist (1)	Cleveland Stadium	—	1–3	L1
5	April 12 (2)	@ Indians	3–0	Clemens (1–1)	Scudder (0–1)	—	Cleveland Stadium	20,480	2–3	W1
6	April 13	Orioles	6–8	Frowirth (1–0)	Fossas (0–1)	Olson (1)	Fenway Park	34,472	2–4	L1
7	April 15	Orioles	6–5	Harris (1–0)	Davis (0–1)	Reardon (1)	Fenway Park	27,185	3–4	W1
—	April 16	Orioles	Postponed (rain). Makeup date July 31.							
8	April 17	Blue Jays	1–0	Clemens (2–1)	Wells (1–1)	Reardon (2)	Fenway Park	27,467	4–4	W2
9	April 18	Blue Jays	1–2	Stottlemyre (1–1)	Viola (0–2)	Henke (2)	Fenway Park	32,640	4–5	L1
10	April 19	Blue Jays	5–4	Darwin (1–0)	Henke (1–1)	—	Fenway Park	28,196	5–5	W1
11	April 20	Blue Jays	4–6 (13)	MacDonald (1–0)	Bolton (0–1)	—	Fenway Park	34,709	5–6	L1
12	April 21	@ Brewers	3–1	Gardiner (2–0)	Austin (1–1)	Darwin (1)	Milwaukee County Stadium	8,257	6–6	W1
—	April 22	@ Brewers	Postponed (cold). Makeup date August 14.							
13	April 23	@ Brewers	2–3	Wegman (2–1)	Clemens (2–2)	Henry (2)	Milwaukee County Stadium	9,740	6–7	L1
14	April 24	Rangers	3–1 (6)	Viola (1–2)	Guzmán (1–2)	—	Fenway Park	31,461	7–7	W1
—	April 25	Rangers	Postponed (rain). Makeup date April 26.							
15	April 26 (1)	Rangers	1–3	Witt (2–2)	Young (0–2)	Russell (4)	Fenway Park	—	7–8	L1
16	April 26 (2)	Rangers	2–4	Mathews (1–1)	Harris (1–1)	Russell (5)	Fenway Park	32,728	7–9	L2
17	April 28	White Sox	6–3	Clemens (3–2)	McKaskill (1–3)	Reardon (3)	Fenway Park	27,673	8–9	W1
18	April 29	White Sox	6–1	Viola (2–2)	Fernandez (1–2)	Reardon (4)	Fenway Park	27,205	9–9	W2

May: 15–12

#	Date	Opponent	Score	Win	Loss	Save	Stadium	Attendance	Record	Streak
19	May 1	Royals	6–5	Darwin (2–0)	Montgomery (0–3)	—	Fenway Park	27,973	10–9	W3
20	May 2	Royals	7–6	Harris (2–1)	Pichardo (0–1)	Reardon (5)	Fenway Park	31,978	11–9	W4
21	May 3	Royals	2–5	Appier (1–2)	Hesketh (0–1)	Montgomery (3)	Fenway Park	33,368	11–10	L1
22	May 4	Twins	1–6	Smiley (1–2)	Clemens (3–3)	—	Fenway Park	25,843	11–11	L2
23	May 5	Twins	4–1	Viola (3–2)	Mahomes (2–1)	Reardon (6)	Fenway Park	25,009	12–11	W1
24	May 6	@ White Sox	5–7	Radinsky (2–1)	Darwin (2–1)	Thigpen (6)	Comiskey Park	25,338	12–12	L1
25	May 7	@ White Sox	6–7	Pall (1–0)	Harris (2–2)	Thigpen (7)	Comiskey Park	25,582	12–13	L2
26	May 8	@ Royals	1–2	Appier (2–2)	Hesketh (0–2)	Montgomery (6)	Royals Stadium	22,063	12–14	L3
27	May 9	@ Royals	5–0	Clemens (4–3)	Gordon (0–4)	—	Royals Stadium	28,444	13–14	W1
28	May 10	@ Royals	10–6	Viola (4–2)	Magnante (0–3)	—	Royals Stadium	19,180	14–14	W2
29	May 12	@ Twins	3–6	Tapani (2–4)	Gardiner (2–1)	Aguilera (10)	Metrodome	19,270	14–15	L1
30	May 13	@ Twins	3–4	Edens (2–0)	Harris (2–3)	—	Metrodome	21,472	14–16	L2
31	May 15	Angels	3–0	Clemens (5–3)	Abbott (2–5)	—	Fenway Park	33,254	15–16	W1
32	May 16	Angels	3–0	Viola (5–2)	Valera (2–2)	Reardon (7)	Fenway Park	33,247	16–16	W2
33	May 17	Angels	1–3	Langston (4–1)	Dopson (0–1)	Harvey (12)	Fenway Park	32,554	16–17	L1
34	May 18	Mariners	3–2	Gardiner (3–1)	Hanson (1–6)	Reardon (8)	Fenway Park	24,377	17–17	W1
35	May 19	Mariners	7–5	Bolton (1–1)	Nelson (0–2)	Reardon (9)	Fenway Park	27,091	18–17	W2
36	May 20	Mariners	6–4	Clemens (6–3)	Powell (1–1)	Reardon (10)	Fenway Park	32,055	19–17	W3
37	May 22	Athletics	3–5	Stewart (3–4)	Viola (5–3)	Eckersley (17)	Fenway Park	33,591	19–18	L1
38	May 23	Athletics	5–1	Dopson (1–1)	Moore (5–3)	—	Fenway Park	33,186	20–18	W1
39	May 24	Athletics	0–4	Darling (4–2)	Gardiner (3–2)	—	Fenway Park	33,965	20–19	L1
40	May 26	@ Angels	4–1	Clemens (7–3)	Abbott (2–6)	Reardon (11)	Anaheim Stadium	23,649	21–19	W1
41	May 27	@ Angels	4–3 (10)	Reardon (1–0)	Harvey (0–3)	Darwin (2)	Anaheim Stadium	23,127	22–19	W2
42	May 28	@ Angels	2–1	Hesketh (1–2)	Langston (5–2)	Reardon (12)	Anaheim Stadium	23,843	23–19	W3
43	May 29	@ Mariners	3–7	Powell (2–1)	Dopson (1–2)	—	Kingdome	18,270	23–20	L1
44	May 30	@ Mariners	0–3	Fleming (7–1)	Gardiner (3–3)	—	Kingdome	40,484	23–21	L2
45	May 31	@ Mariners	7–1	Clemens (8–3)	Johnson (5–5)	—	Kingdome	39,005	24–21	W1

June: 11–17

#	Date	Opponent	Score	Win	Loss	Save	Stadium	Attendance	Record	Streak
46	June 1	@ Athletics	7–10	Campbell (1–0)	Darwin (2–2)	—	Oakland Coliseum	24,518	24–22	L1
47	June 2	@ Athletics	4–5	Moore (7–3)	Hesketh (1–3)	Eckersley (19)	Oakland Coliseum	25,553	24–23	L2
48	June 3	@ Athletics	6–7	Parrett (5–0)	Gardiner (3–4)	Eckersley (20)	Oakland Coliseum	31,294	24–24	L3
—	June 5	Indians	Postponed (rain). Makeup date June 6.							
49	June 6 (1)	Indians	5–1	Clemens (9–3)	Armstrong (1–7)	—	Fenway Park	—	25–24	W1
50	June 6 (2)	Indians	1–3	Nagy (7–3)	Viola (5–4)	Olin (12)	Fenway Park	32,937	25–25	L1
51	June 7	Indians	4–0	Hesketh (2–3)	Otto (4–4)	Darwin	Fenway Park	33,202	26–25	W1
52	June 8	@ Orioles	2–5	Bob Milacki (5–3)	Gardiner (3–5)	Olson (15)	Camden Yards	46,061	26–26	L1
53	June 9	@ Orioles	4–1	Dopson (2–2)	Mesa (2–6)	Reardon (13)	Camden Yards	46,085	27–26	W1
54	June 10	@ Orioles	1–3	Sutcliffe (9–4)	Bolton (1–2)	Olson (16)	Camden Yards	45,733	27–27	L1
55	June 11	@ Blue Jays	0–4	Morris (7–3)	Clemens (9–4)	—	Skydome	50,423	27–28	L2
56	June 12	@ Blue Jays	5–0	Viola (6–4)	Stieb (3–6)	—	Skydome	50,387	28–28	W1
57	June 13	@ Blue Jays	5–3	Hesketh (3–3)	Stottlemyre (5–5)	Reardon (14)	Skydome	50,397	29–28	W2
58	June 14	@ Blue Jays	2–6	Guzmán (8–1)	Gardiner (3–6)	Ward (7)	Skydome	50,412	29–29	L1
59	June 15	Yankees	1–0	Dopson (3–2)	Sanderson (4–5)	Reardon (15)	Fenway Park	33,577	30–29	W1
60	June 16	Yankees	4–3 (10)	Darwin (3–2)	Cadaret (3–6)	—	Fenway Park	34,592	31–29	W2
61	June 17	Yankees	4–3	Viola (7–4)	Kamieniecki (1–5)	Fossas (1)	Fenway Park	33,916	32–29	W3
62	June 18	Yankees	4–5	Pérez (7–4)	Darwin (3–3)	Farr (10)	Fenway Park	34,076	32–30	L1
63	June 19	@ Rangers	1–4	Witt (8–5)	Gardiner (3–7)	Russell (18)	Arlington Stadium	32,025	32–31	L2
64	June 20	@ Rangers	1–4	Brown (10–4)	Dopson (3–3)	Rogers (4)	Arlington Stadium	40,401	32–32	L3
65	June 21	@ Rangers	2–3	Burns (2–0)	Clemens (9–5)	Russell (19)	Arlington Stadium	32,648	32–33	L4
66	June 22	@ Tigers	2–4 (11)	Knudsen (2–0)	Darwin (3–4)	—	Tiger Stadium	19,040	32–34	L5
67	June 23	@ Tigers	7–11	Kiely (1–0)	Hesketh (3–4)	—	Tiger Stadium	14,134	32–35	L6
68	June 24	@ Tigers	1–5	Tanana (6–5)	Gardiner (3–8)	—	Tiger Stadium	20,834	32–36	L7
69	June 26	Brewers	8–4	Dopson (4–3)	Robinson (1–3)	—	Fenway Park	33,637	33–36	W1
70	June 27	Brewers	8–7 (13)	Darwin (4–4)	Holmes (2–3)	—	Fenway Park	33,734	34–36	W2
71	June 28	Brewers	3–9	Navarro (8–6)	Viola (7–5)	—	Fenway Park	33,237	34–37	L1
72	June 29	Tigers	3–8	Tanana (7–5)	Hesketh (3–5)	Knudsen (2)	Fenway Park	33,388	34–38	L2
73	June 30	Tigers	8–5	Irvine (1–0)	Henneman (0–3)	—	Fenway Park	33,485	35–38	W1

July: 13–15

#	Date	Opponent	Score	Win	Loss	Save	Stadium	Attendance	Record	Streak
74	July 1	Tigers	6–4	Dopson (5–3)	Gullickson (9–5)	Reardon (16)	Fenway Park	32,059	36–38	W2
75	July 2	@ White Sox	3–8	Álvarez (1–2)	Clemens (9–6)	Hernández (1)	Comiskey Park	32,448	36–39	L1
76	July 3	@ White Sox	1–2 (10)	Thigpen (1–2)	Harris (2–4)	—	Comiskey Park	35,584	36–40	L2
77	July 4	@ White Sox	2–1	Hesketh (4–5)	McDowell (11–4)	Reardon (17)	Comiskey Park	42,285	37–40	W1
78	July 5	@ White Sox	2–4	Hibbard (7–4)	Gardiner (3–9)	Radinsky (4)	Comiskey Park	40,088	37–41	L1
79	July 6	Royals	3–6	Reed (2–3)	Dopson (5–4)	Meachum (1)	Fenway Park	28,495	37–42	L2
80	July 7	Royals	3–2 (11)	Darwin (5–4)	Meachum (4–2)	—	Fenway Park	30,078	38–42	W1
81	July 8	Royals	4–5	Fossas (1–1)	Gordon (1–9)	Reardon (18)	Fenway Park	31,196	39–42	W2
82	July 9	White Sox	3–10	McDowell (12–4)	Hesketh (4–6)	—	Fenway Park	33,357	39–43	L1
83	July 10	White Sox	6–5	Reardon (2–0)	Leach (1–3)	—	Fenway Park	34,288	40–43	W1
84	July 11	White Sox	11–2	Dopson (6–4)	McCaskill (6–7)	—	Fenway Park	34,288	41–43	W2
85	July 12	White Sox	3–0	Viola (8–5)	Álvarez (2–3)	Harris (1)	Fenway Park	34,105	42–43	W3
86	July 16	@ Twins	6–7	Willis (4–2)	Gardiner (3–10)	Aguilera (27)	Metrodome	39,865	42–44	L1
87	July 17	@ Twins	2–3 (10)	Kipper (3–3)	Harris (2–5)	—	Metrodome	42,368	42–45	L2
88	July 18	@ Twins	1–0	Clemens (10–6)	Erickson (10–7)	—	Metrodome	42,078	43–45	W1
89	July 19	@ Twins	5–7	Guthrie (2–2)	Harris (2–6)	Aguilera (28)	Metrodome	38,735	43–46	L1
90	July 20	@ Royals	5–3	Quantrill (1–0)	Shifflett (1–2)	Reardon (19)	Royals Stadium	30,260	44–46	W1
91	July 21	@ Royals	0–8	Pichardo (5–4)	Hesketh (4–7)	—	Royals Stadium	21,921	44–47	L1
92	July 22	@ Royals	4–6	Gordon (3–9)	Viola (8–6)	Montgomery (23)	Royals Stadium	22,978	44–48	L2
—	July 23	Twins	Postponed (rain). Makeup date July 24.							
93	July 24 (1)	Twins	0–5	Erickson (7–7)	Clemens (10–7)	—	Fenway Park	—	44–49	L3
94	July 24 (2)	Twins	5–4	Irvine (2–0)	Willis (4–3)	—	Fenway Park	34,614	45–49	W1
95	July 25	Twins	2–3	Banks (4–3)	Darwin (5–5)	Aguilera (29)	Fenway Park	34,420	45–50	L1
96	July 26	Twins	2–8	Tapani (11–6)	Hesketh (4–8)	Guthrie (3)	Fenway Park	33,095	45–51	L2
97	July 27	Rangers	7–5	Viola (9–6)	Brown (14–7)	Reardon (20)	Fenway Park	32,927	46–51	W1
98	July 28	Rangers	1–2 (10)	León (1–1)	Quantrill (1–1)	Russell (26)	Fenway Park	33,188	46–52	L1
99	July 29	Rangers	6–5	Clemens (11–7)	Burns (2–4)	Reardon (21)	Fenway Park	31,587	47–52	W1
100	July 31 (1)	Orioles	7–4	Hesketh (5–8)	Frohwirth (3–2)	Reardon	Fenway Park	28,349	48–52	W2
101	July 31 (2)	Orioles	3–4 (6)	Lewis (1–0)	Young (0–3)	Davis (3)	Fenway Park	32,748	48–53	L1

August: 12–18

#	Date	Opponent	Score	Win	Loss	Save	Stadium	Attendance	Record	Streak
102	August 1	Orioles	3–8	Clements (4–1)	Viola (9–7)	—	Fenway Park	33,788	48–54	L2
103	August 2	Orioles	1–2	McDonald (11–7)	Fossas (1–2)	Olson (25)	Fenway Park	33,637	48–55	L3
104	August 3	Blue Jays	7–1	Clemens (12–7)	Guzmán (12–3)	—	Fenway Park	34,024	49–55	W1
105	August 4	Blue Jays	9–4	Hesketh (6–8)	Wells (6–5)	Harris (2)	Fenway Park	33,294	50–55	W2
106	August 5	Blue Jays	4–5	Eichhorn (4–4)	Irvine (2–1)	Henke (20)	Fenway Park	33,395	50–56	L1
107	August 6	@ Yankees	3–1	Viola (10–7)	Pérez (9–11)	Reardon (23)	Yankee Stadium	38,112	51–56	W1
108	August 7	@ Yankees	5–7	Sanderson (9–8)	Dopson (6–5)	Farr (15)	Yankee Stadium	33,483	51–57	L1
109	August 8	@ Yankees	4–2	Clemens (13–7)	Kamieniecki (2–9)	Reardon (24)	Yankee Stadium	48,774	52–57	W1
110	August 9	@ Yankees	0–6	Militello (1–0)	Hesketh (6–9)	Farr (16)	Yankee Stadium	41,125	52–58	L1
111	August 10	@ Indians	5–8	Armstrong (4–13)	Quantrill (1–2)	Olin (19)	Cleveland Stadium	9,225	52–59	L2
112	August 11	@ Indians	1–3	Otto (5–8)	Viola (10–8)	Lilliquist (5)	Cleveland Stadium	15,425	52–60	L3
113	August 12	@ Indians	5–8	Plunk (3–2)	Irvine (2–2)	Olin (20)	Cleveland Stadium	11,516	52–61	L4
114	August 13	@ Indians	14–7	Clemens (14–7)	Nagy (12–8)	Reardon (25)	Cleveland Stadium	26,797	53–61	W1
115	August 14 (1)	@ Brewers	7–8 (13)	Austin (3–2)	Reardon (2–1)	—	Milwaukee County Stadium	—	53–62	L1
116	August 14 (2)	@ Brewers	0–1	Eldred (3–1)	Harris (2–7)	Holmes (2)	Milwaukee County Stadium	25,598	53–63	L2
117	August 15	@ Brewers	3–1	Darwin (6–5)	Wegman (10–10)	—	Milwaukee County Stadium	35,095	54–63	W1
118	August 16	@ Brewers	0–1	Navarro (13–8)	Viola (10–9)	—	Milwaukee County Stadium	27,174	54–64	L1
119	August 18	Angels	8–0	Clemens (15–7)	Langston (11–11)	—	Fenway Park	33,339	55–64	W1
120	August 19	Angels	2–3	Abbott (5–12)	Reardon (2–2)	Grahe (15)	Fenway Park	32,980	55–65	L1
121	August 20	Angels	0–2	Blyleven (7–5)	Darwin (6–6)	Grahe (16)	Fenway Park	32,879	55–66	L2
122	August 21	Mariners	2–5	Johnson (10–12)	Viola (10–10)	—	Fenway Park	33,444	55–67	L3
123	August 22	Mariners	10–8	Harris (3–7)	Barton (0–1)	Reardon (26)	Fenway Park	33,275	56–67	W1
124	August 23	Mariners	3–9	Powell (3–2)	Clemens (15–8)	—	Fenway Park	33,365	56–68	L1
125	August 24	Athletics	3–9	Stewart (9–8)	Dopson (6–6)	—	Fenway Park	33,494	56–69	L2
126	August 25	Athletics	5–4	Quantrill (2–2)	Eckersley (6–1)	Reardon (27)	Fenway Park	33,387	57–69	W1
127	August 26	Athletics	2–1 (10)	Viola (11–10)	Campbell (2–2)	—	Fenway Park	33,193	58–69	W2
128	August 28	@ Angels	7–1	Clemens (16–8)	Finley (4–11)	—	Anaheim Stadium	29,872	59–69	W3
129	August 29	@ Angels	2–7	Langston (12–11)	Dopson (6–7)	—	Anaheim Stadium	24,717	59–70	L1
130	August 30	@ Angels	4–2 (10)	Darwin (7–6)	Butcher (2–2)	Harris (3)	Anaheim Stadium	22,421	60–70	W1
131	August 31	@ Mariners	2–15	Johnson (11–12)	Viola (11–11)	—	Kingdome	14,017	60–71	L1

September / October: 13–18

#	Date	Opponent	Score	Win	Loss	Save	Stadium	Attendance	Record	Streak
132	September 1	@ Mariners	3–4	Schooler (2–6)	Harris (3–8)	—	Kingdome	12,458	60–72	L2
133	September 2	@ Mariners	5–3	Clemens (17–8)	Leary (6–7)	—	Kingdome	14,717	61–72	W1
134	September 4	@ Athletics	8–3	Darwin (8–6)	Stewart (10–9)	—	Oakland Coliseum	35,084	62–72	W2
135	September 5	@ Athletics	7–3	Dopson (7–7)	Darling (12–9)	—	Oakland Coliseum	32,610	63–72	W3
136	September 6	@ Athletics	1–2 (10)	Eckersley (7–1)	Quantrill (2–3)	—	Oakland Coliseum	29,670	63–73	L1
137	September 7	@ Rangers	3–0	Clemens (18–8)	Ryan (5–9)	Hesketh (1)	Arlington Stadium	29,699	64–73	W1
138	September 8	@ Rangers	1–6	Brown (19–8)	Young (0–4)	—	Arlington Stadium	13,294	64–74	L1
139	September 9	@ Rangers	2–3	Guzmán (13–11)	Darwin (8–7)	—	Arlington Stadium	13,542	64–75	L2
140	September 11	Tigers	5–4	Gardiner (4–10)	Doherty (5–4)	Ryan (1)	Fenway Park	32,696	65–75	W1
141	September 12	Tigers	5–9	Terrell (6–10)	Clemens (18–9)	—	Fenway Park	32,865	65–76	L1
142	September 13	Tigers	2–7	Tanana (12–9)	Dopson (7–8)	—	Fenway Park	32,615	65–77	L2
143	September 14	Brewers	0–6	Bosio (14–5)	Darwin (8–8)	—	Fenway Park	27,578	65–78	L3
144	September 15	Brewers	2–7	Austin (4–2)	Viola (11–12)	—	Fenway Park	23,757	65–79	L4
145	September 16	Brewers	2–1 (15)	Irvine (3–2)	Henry (1–4)	—	Fenway Park	24,106	66–79	W1
146	September 17	Brewers	4–10	Navarro (16–11)	Clemens (18–10)	—	Fenway Park	29,515	66–80	L1
147	September 18	@ Tigers	3–10	Doherty (6–4)	Dopson (7–9)	King (1)	Tiger Stadium	14,951	66–81	L2
148	September 19	@ Tigers	2–3	Tanana (13–9)	Harris (3–9)	—	Tiger Stadium	18,613	66–82	L3
149	September 20	@ Tigers	5–4	Viola (12–12)	Gullickson (14–12)	Fossas (2)	Tiger Stadium	18,459	67–82	W1
150	September 21	@ Tigers	5–6 (10)	Leiter (8–5)	Irvine (3–3)	—	Tiger Stadium	9,558	67–83	L1
151	September 22	Indians	4–2	Power (2–3)	Clemens (18–11)	Lilliquist (6)	Fenway Park	24,412	67–84	W1
152	September 23	Indians	3–7	Nagy (16–10)	Taylor (0–1)	—	Fenway Park	26,415	67–85	L1
153	September 24	Indians	6–4	Darwin (9–8)	Scudder (6–10)	Harris (4)	Fenway Park	28,135	68–85	W1
—	September 25	Orioles	Postponed (rain). Makeup date September 26.							
154	September 26 (1)	@ Orioles	7–3 (14)	Harris (4–9)	Frohwirth (4–3)	—	Camden Yards	—	69–85	W2
155	September 26 (2)	@ Orioles	0–2	Lefferts (14–11)	Dopson (7–10)	Olson (35)	Camden Yards	45,454	69–86	L1
156	September 27	@ Orioles	6–1	Hesketh (7–9)	Sutcliffe (16–15)	—	Camden Yards	45,597	70–86	W1
157	September 28	@ Orioles	6–7	Davis (7–3)	Irvine (3–4)	—	Camden Yards	45,663	70–87	L1
158	September 29	@ Blue Jays	2–5	Key (13–13)	Darwin (9–9)	Henke (33)	SkyDome	50,418	70–88	L2
159	September 30	@ Blue Jays	1–0	Viola (13–12)	Cone (17–10)	—	SkyDome	50,420	71–88	W1
160	October 2	Yankees	3–6	Wickman (6–1)	Dopson (7–11)	Farr (30)	Fenway Park	33,097	71–89	L1
161	October 3	Yankees	7–5	Taylor (1–1)	Sanderson (12–11)	—	Fenway Park	33,223	72–89	W1
162	October 4	Yankees	8–2	Heseth (8–9)	Kamienieski (6–14)	Quantrill (1)	Fenway Park	33,229	73–89	W2
