= Todd Pratt =

American baseball player & coach (born 1967)

Glacier Range Riders
- Catcher / Coach
- Born: February 9, 1967 (age 59); Bellevue, Nebraska, U.S.
- Batted: Right Threw: Right

MLB debut
- July 29, 1992, for the Philadelphia Phillies

Last MLB appearance
- September 27, 2006, for the Atlanta Braves

MLB statistics
- Batting average: .251
- Home runs: 49
- Runs batted in: 224
- Stats at Baseball Reference

Teams
- Philadelphia Phillies (1992–1994); Chicago Cubs (1995); New York Mets (1997–2001); Philadelphia Phillies (2001–2005); Atlanta Braves (2006)

Todd Alan Pratt (born February 9, 1967) is an American former professional baseball player. He played in Major League Baseball (MLB) between 1992 and 2006, primarily serving as a back-up catcher for most of his career. Following his playing career, Pratt has served in a number of coaching roles including in college baseball and also in Minor League Baseball with the Miami Marlins. He is currently manager of the Glacier Range Riders, an independent baseball team of the Pioneer League in Kalispell, Montana.

== Playing career ==
=== Boston Red Sox ===
Pratt was drafted during the 6th round of the 1985 amateur draft. Considered a good prospect, Pratt skipped the entry-level Rookie League and instead was catapulted into the New York–Penn League, where Pratt, barely 18 and out of high school, spent most of his time facing Latin American players with years of professional baseball experience and older American players drafted out of premier universities. This appeared to be a mistake for Pratt, who batted .134 in his first professional appearance and was occasionally pinch-hit for with pitchers (who do not bat in the NY-PL), although he displayed outstanding defense.

The Red Sox refused to admit their mistake and have Pratt repeat the level in 1986, and instead promoted him to the full-season South Atlantic League. Pratt improved, however, and was easily the best catcher on the team, the Greensboro Hornets. He again played excellent defense and was a favorite receiver of Greensboro pitchers, and although his hitting had improved greatly from his debut season, he was still overmatched at the plate, batting .241 and striking out 114 times with only 30 extra-base hits.

He was again promoted in 1987, this time to the Florida State League, where he enjoyed the first full-success of his career. He received a lot of playing time in Spring Training with the Boston Red Sox and was again the best catcher for their A-ball affiliate Winter Haven Red Sox. At Winter Haven, Pratt batted a more-impressive .258 and lowered his strikeout total while continuing to play excellent defense.

=== Cleveland Indians ===
Pratt was assigned to Winter Haven during the 1987 season by Boston to make room for another player on the 40-man roster and was never placed on the 40-man roster by December. Pratt had played three seasons in the minor leagues without being on a Major League 40-man roster. This made him eligible for the annual Rule 5 draft, where he was selected by the Cleveland Indians. Rule 5 players have to remain on the selecting team's Major League roster all season or be offered back to the original team in lieu of cash. Pratt played well in Spring Training and competed for a spot as the backup to Andy Allanson, but was beat out for the job by Chris Bando. Pratt was returned to Boston at the end of Spring Training.

=== Boston Red Sox second stint ===
Pratt was assigned to the Eastern League upon his return to the Boston organization in 1988. His struggles at the plate returned at the AA-level, with his batting average dropping to .225 with 110 strikeouts to go along with only 25 extra-base hits. His defense was still sharp and he was still the best catcher for the New Britain Red Sox, though it was beginning to become clear that Pratt's days in professional baseball were numbered.

Finally admitting that they had made a mistake by having Pratt skip a level upon drafting him and that it had affected his development as a hitter, Boston officials decided to have him repeat the AA-level again. He returned to New Britain but fared no better, seeing his batting average finish at .228.

By 1990 the Red Sox had all but given up on Pratt. It was his last year under contract and he'd had a lot of upside but almost no success as a hitter. His prospect status long-gone, he received a lot of playing time in Spring Training with no chance of making the team, making it obvious that the Red Sox were showcasing Pratt for trading partners to move him out of the organization. There were no takers. The Red Sox considered releasing Pratt, but instead decided to send him back to New Britain to serve as a backup catcher and player/coach to tutor prospects Don Florence, Josias Manzanillo, Kevin Morton, Jeff Plympton, Paul Quantrill, and Scott Taylor.

Pratt became a six-year minor league free agent following the 1990 season, although he quickly signed a minor league contract with an invitation to Spring Training to return to Boston. The Red Sox sent Pratt to the International League to serve once again as a player/coach, this time working with Gar Finnvold, Mike Gardiner, Peter Hoy, Ken Ryan, and once again Manzanillo, Morton, Plympton, Quantrill, and Taylor. As the pitchers began reaching the Major Leagues, leaving the organization, or losing their prospect status, the need for a player-coach in Pratt's vein dissipated. He became a six-year minor league free agent at the end of the 1991 season and this time left the Boston organization for good.

=== Baltimore Orioles ===
Pratt signed a minor league contract with an invitation to Spring Training with the Baltimore Orioles on November 13, 1991.

=== Philadelphia Phillies ===
Pratt was not on Baltimore's 40-man roster and was instead assigned to the roster of the Rochester Red Wings. Given his years of experience in the minor leagues without being on a Major League 40-man roster Pratt was still eligible for the Rule 5 draft and was taken by the Philadelphia Phillies. Pratt played in Spring Training in 1992 and was competing for a job as the backup to Darren Daulton, but lost out to Steve Lake. Pratt had signed with Baltimore on November 13, 1991, to provide depth at the catching position and nothing more, while the 1991 Rule 5 draft took place on December 9, 1991, making Pratt a signee of little importance who'd only been in the Baltimore organization for a little more than three weeks during the off-season. When Philadelphia cut Pratt they offered him back to Baltimore but the Orioles organization showed little interest in re-acquiring the minor league veteran. Philadelphia considered releasing Pratt, but still felt he had a lot of upside and decided that too much catching was not a bad thing. Being thin at the AA level, the Phillies sent Pratt to the Eastern League to serve as the everyday catcher. Pratt finally managed to find his swing after his eighth season in the minors, however, batting .333 with a .530 slugging percentage. This performance earned him a promotion to the International League at the midway point of the season, where he finished out the minor league campaign by hitting .320 with a .576 slugging percentage, giving him combined season totals of a .327 batting average and a .553 slugging percentage. When rosters were expanded in September Pratt's contract was purchased by the Phillies, finally allowing him to reach the major leagues after eight seasons in the minors. Pratt played 16 games as the third catcher for the Phillies in September and batted .283.

Pratt won a job on Philadelphia's roster in Spring Training of 1993 as the backup to Daulton. He played 33 games and batted .287 in 1993, helping the Phillies win the National League East and topple the Atlanta Braves in the NLCS to take home the NL pennant, though they lost in six games to the reigning Toronto Blue Jays in the World Series.

Pratt served as Philadelphia's backup to Daulton again in 1994 and had played in 25 games when players struck in August. Pratt's performance was poor however, batting only .196 in limited action. The Phillies were not playing well at the time of the strike and hoped to improve after playing resumed. The strike, however, dragged on and the rest of the season, the postseason, and eventually the World Series were all cancelled. The Phillies decided to make several changes in the off-season as the strike dragged on, and Pratt was non-tendered, making him a free agent.

=== Chicago Cubs ===
The strike continued into 1995, with Spring Training being cancelled and no apparent progress being made, and the lack of an agreement left free agents like Pratt in limbo. After MLB owners threatened to use replacement players to begin the season and several minor leaguers and former Major League players crossed the picket line and began participating in Spring Training both sides quickly began rushing to an agreement. The strike finally ended in late March and Spring Training officially began in April. After these developments Pratt finally signed a minor league contract with an invitation to Spring Training with the Chicago Cubs on April 8, 1995. Pratt competed for a job as the backup to Scott Servais but lost out to Rick Wilkins. The Cubs decided to keep Pratt in the organization and assigned him to the American Association. Pratt batted .308 in 25 games and was called up to replace Wilkins, who was batting well-below .200 at the midway point of the season. Pratt, however, was even worse, batting only .133 in the second half and once again being pinch hit for with pitchers. After Wilkins was recalled again in September the two split backup catching duties depending on the situation. Pratt was non-tendered at the end of the season and became a free agent.

=== Seattle Mariners ===
Pratt signed a minor league contract with an invitation to Spring Training with the Seattle Mariners on January 25, 1996. Pratt was brought into Spring Training by Seattle as catching depth and had no chance of making the team, being cut late in Spring Training. The Mariners decided not to keep him in the organization and released him on March 27, 1996.

Pratt went unsigned for the rest of 1996 and worked part-time delivering pizzas for Domino's and as an instructor at Bucky Dent's baseball school.

=== New York Mets ===
Pratt signed a minor league contract with an invitation to Spring Training with the New York Mets on December 23, 1996. Pratt was competing for a job as the backup to Todd Hundley but lost out to Alberto Castillo. The Mets optioned Pratt to the Norfolk Tides to be their everyday catcher, where he batted .301 in 59 games. With Castillo struggling at the Major League level, Pratt was recalled in the second half of the season and hit a game-tying home run in his first at-bat with the Mets. Pratt played 39 games with the Mets and batted .283. The Mets surged to 88 wins in the second half of 1997 with Pratt as their backup catcher but finished in third place and missed the playoffs by a wide margin.

The Mets brought Pratt back in 1998. With Hundley injured and unable to play and unable to catch for all of 1998 (although he did find his way behind the plate for two games in September), Pratt competed for jobs in Spring Training as both New York's starting catcher or its backup. However, he lost out on both jobs to Castillo and Tim Spehr. After Spehr was injured there was a chance that Pratt could be recalled, but the Mets instead stunned the National League and acquired Mike Piazza from the Florida Marlins in exchange for a host of prospects, relegating Castillo to a more familiar backup role and leaving Pratt at Norfolk. Pratt batted .366 in the minor leagues while Castillo's hitting hadn't come around after parts of two seasons in the catching mix for the Mets, however, and Pratt was once again recalled in the second half, playing in 41 games and batting .275. The Mets won 88 games again but missed out on the playoffs by losing to the Atlanta Braves on the last day of the season. Pratt became a free agent at the end of the year.

Piazza was signed to a long-term deal, Hundley finally became healthy enough to catch again and was packaged in a three-team deal that netted the Mets Armando Benitez and Roger Cedeno, Castillo was traded to the St. Louis Cardinals to serve as a part-time starter behind the plate, and the Mets re-signed Pratt to a minor league contract with an invitation to Spring Training. Without anyone else in his way, Pratt easily won the backup job to Piazza. He played in 71 games and batted .293. The Mets finished the season with 97 wins, behind the Braves but tied with the Cincinnati Reds in the Wild Card race. The two teams played a one-game playoff which the Mets won on the strength of a complete game, two-hit shutout by Al Leiter, allowing the Mets to win the National League Wild Card. Piazza injured his thumb in the NLDS against the Arizona Diamondbacks, pressing Pratt into starting duty for the final two games of the series. The Mets won game three behind Rick Reed, and Pratt came up big in game four, hitting a walk-off solo homer against Matt Mantei in extra innings to clinch the series for the Mets and send them to the NLCS. In game five of the NLCS, Robin Ventura hit what appeared to be a game-winning grand slam in the 16th inning that would have sent the series back to Atlanta. Pratt (who was supposed to be running the bases) was the first Met to embrace Ventura. Since Ventura only touched first base, he was officially credited with a single, referred to jokingly as a "Grand Slam Single". The Mets, however, lost the NLCS to the Braves in six games. Pratt became a free agent at the end of the year.

The Mets re-signed Pratt to a minor league contract and he once again won the role of Piazza's backup in Spring Training. Pratt played in 80 games and batted .275. The Mets won 94 games and emerged as Wild Card winners once again. The Mets toppled the San Francisco Giants in the NLDS and took down the Cardinals in the NLCS, sending them to the World Series against their crosstown rivals, the New York Yankees. Pratt started game one of the series in Yankee Stadium as Piazza was penciled into the lineup as the DH against southpaw Andy Pettitte, a game-time decision as manager Bobby Valentine had considered starting Bubba Trammell against the lefty. The Mets lost in extra innings. Lenny Harris started game two at DH against Roger Clemens and Piazza returned to catching, while Pratt did not start another game in the series. The Mets lost in five games. Pratt became a free agent at the end of the season.

The Mets re-signed Pratt to a minor league contract and he won the backup job to Piazza again, although it had become obvious that longtime Mets farmhand Vance Wilson, never a prospect, had emerged as a more capable backup than Pratt. Pratt played in 45 games for the Mets but only batted .163, being traded mid-season to the Philadelphia Phillies in exchange for Gary Bennett. Bennett got a hit in his only at-bat as a Met and was also traded out of the organization, allowing Wilson to be recalled and serve as Piazza's backup.

=== Philadelphia Phillies second stint ===
Pratt played in 35 games for the Phillies for the remainder of the 2001 season in a backup role to Johnny Estrada and batted .204, raising his season average to .185.

Despite the poor performance in 2001, the Phillies re-signed Pratt to a minor league contract in 2002 to serve as the backup to Mike Lieberthal. Pratt played in 39 games and batted .311.

Returning to Philadelphia on another minor league contract in 2003, Pratt played in 43 games and batted .272 as Lieberthal's backup.

Pratt signed another minor league deal with the Phillies in 2004 and played in 45 games and batted .258 as Lieberthal's backup.

The Phillies brought Pratt back again on a minor league deal in 2005 and he played in 60 games and batted .251 as Lieberthal's backup. Pratt became a free agent at the end of the year and, this time, the Phillies opted to part ways with the veteran backup.

=== Atlanta Braves ===
Pratt signed a minor league contract with an invitation to Spring Training with the Braves on December 13, 2005. Pratt won a job in Spring Training as the backup to Brian McCann. Pratt played in 62 games and batted .207. Pratt became a free agent at the end of the season.

=== New York Yankees ===
Pratt signed a minor league contract with an invitation to Spring Training with the Yankees on January 12, 2007, although the terms of the deal were unclear, with some sources speculating that Pratt would return to the minor leagues as a player/coach to tutor young Yankees pitchers, a role he'd filled years before with the Boston Red Sox organization. The Yankees had a dearth of backup catchers in spring training and it was unclear what Pratt's role was, though he appeared to be the frontrunner to win the job as the backup to Jorge Posada. However, he lost out on the job to Wil Nieves. The Yankees offered Pratt a position in the organization to tutor some of their pitchers in the minor leagues, though Pratt declined and decided to retire.

== Post-playing career ==
After his retirement, Pratt was named in the Mitchell Report as a user of performance-enhancing drugs.

Pratt was the head baseball coach and athletic director at West Georgia Technical College, a member of the Georgia Collegiate Athletic Association, from 2011 to 2016, and the owner/head coach of the Carrollton Clippers (formerly known as Douglasville Bulls), a summer wooden-bat collegiate team playing in the Sunbelt Baseball League from 2009 to 2016.

The board of directors of the Sunbelt Baseball League appointed Pratt to serve as the commissioner of the Sunbelt League from 2014 to 2016. He was a manager in the Miami Marlins organization for three seasons (Greensboro Grasshoppers during 2017–2018 and Jupiter Hammerheads during 2019). In January 2020, he was named commissioner of the Sunbelt Baseball League.

In November 2024, Pratt was named manager of the Glacier Range Riders, an independent baseball team of the Pioneer League in Kalispell, Montana.

== Personal life ==
Pratt and his wife Tracy, along with their four children, currently reside just outside Atlanta, in Douglasville, Georgia. Pratt was also a notable player of the online video game Ultima Online, and appeared on the box of Ultima Online: Renaissance for marketing purposes. He also appeared in the movie Taking Out The Trash.
