= 1992 Milwaukee Brewers season =

1992 Milwaukee Brewers
- League: American League
- Division: East
- Ballpark: Milwaukee County Stadium
- City: Milwaukee, Wisconsin
- Record: 92–70 (.568)
- Divisional place: 2nd
- Owners: Bud Selig
- General managers: Sal Bando
- Managers: Phil Garner
- Television: WCGV-TV (Rory Markas, Del Crandall)
- Radio: WTMJ (AM) (Bob Uecker, Pat Hughes)

The 1992 Milwaukee Brewers season was the 23rd season for the Brewers in Milwaukee, and their 24th overall. The Brewers finished in second place in the American League East with a record of 92 wins and 70 losses. This was the last time the Brewers finished at least .500 until 2005, and their last winning season until 2007. This proved to be their final winning season as a member of the American League.

== Offseason ==
- October 15, 1991: George Canale was traded by the Brewers to the Montreal Expos for Alex Diaz.
- December 6, 1991: Jesse Orosco was sent to the Brewers by the Cleveland Indians as part of a conditional deal.
- December 11, 1991: Dale Sveum was traded by the Brewers to the Philadelphia Phillies for Bruce Ruffin.
- December 16, 1991: Mario Díaz was signed as a free agent by the Brewers.
- March 26, 1992: Gary Sheffield and Geoff Kellogg (minors) were traded by the Brewers to the San Diego Padres for Ricky Bones, José Valentín, and Matt Mieske.

== Regular season ==
(1992)
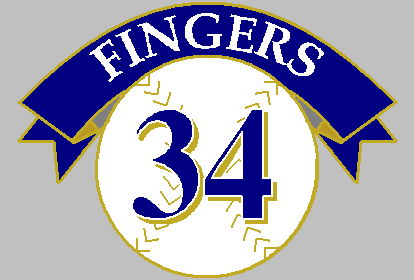
Rollie Fingers
P: 1981–85

=== Season standings ===
AL East
Team	W	L	Pct.	GB	Home	Road
Toronto Blue Jays	96	66	.593	—	53‍–‍28	43‍–‍38
Milwaukee Brewers	92	70	.568	4	53‍–‍28	39‍–‍42
Baltimore Orioles	89	73	.549	7	43‍–‍38	46‍–‍35
Cleveland Indians	76	86	.469	20	41‍–‍40	35‍–‍46
New York Yankees	76	86	.469	20	41‍–‍40	35‍–‍46
Detroit Tigers	75	87	.463	21	38‍–‍42	37‍–‍45
Boston Red Sox	73	89	.451	23	44‍–‍37	29‍–‍52

=== Record vs. opponents ===
1992 American League record Sources:
Team	BAL	BOS	CAL	CWS	CLE	DET	KC	MIL	MIN	NYY	OAK	SEA	TEX	TOR
Baltimore	—	8–5	8–4	6–6	7–6	10–3	8–4	6–7	6–6	5–8	6–6	7–5	7–5	5–8
Boston	5–8	—	8–4	6–6	6–7	4–9	7–5	5–8	3–9	7–6	5–7	6–6	4–8	7–6
California	4–8	4–8	—	3–10	6–6	7–5	8–5	5–7	2–11	7–5	5–8	7–6	9–4	5–7
Chicago	6–6	6–6	10–3	—	7–5	10–2	7–6	5–7	8–5	8–4	5–8	4–9	5–8	5–7
Cleveland	6–7	7–6	6–6	5–7	—	5–8	5–7	5–8	6–6	7–6	6–6	7–5	5–7	6–7
Detroit	3–10	9–4	5–7	2–10	8–5	—	7–5	5–8	3–9	5–8	6–6	9–3	8–4	5–8
Kansas City	4–8	5–7	5–8	6–7	7–5	5–7	—	7–5	6–7	5–7	4–9	7–6	6–7	5–7
Milwaukee	7–6	8–5	7–5	7–5	8–5	8–5	5–7	—	6–6	6–7	7–5	8–4	7–5	8–5
Minnesota	6–6	9–3	11–2	5–8	6–6	9–3	7–6	6–6	—	7–5	5–8	8–5	6–7	5–7
New York	8–5	6–7	5–7	4–8	6–7	8–5	7–5	7–6	5–7	—	6–6	6–6	6–6	2–11
Oakland	6–6	7–5	8–5	8–5	6–6	6–6	9–4	5–7	8–5	6–6	—	12–1	9–4	6–6
Seattle	5–7	6–6	6–7	9–4	5–7	3–9	6–7	4–8	5–8	6–6	1–12	—	4–9	4–8
Texas	5–7	8–4	4–9	8–5	7–5	4–8	7–6	5–7	7–6	6–6	4–9	9–4	—	3–9
Toronto	8–5	6–7	7–5	7–5	7–6	8–5	7–5	5–8	7–5	11–2	6–6	8–4	9–3	—

=== Notable transactions ===
- April 1, 1992: Mario Díaz was released by the Brewers.
- July 7, 1992: Jeff Kunkel was traded by the Brewers to the Chicago Cubs for Ced Landrum.

=== Roster ===
1992 Milwaukee Brewers
Roster
Pitchers: 42 Jim Austin; 25 Ricky Bones; 29 Chris Bosio; 21 Cal Eldred; 36 Mike Fetters; 27 Neal Heaton; 28 Doug Henry; 40 Darren Holmes; 31 Jaime Navarro; 41 Edwin Núñez; 47 Jesse Orosco; 37 Dan Plesac; 33 Ron Robinson; 30 Bruce Ruffin; 46 Bill Wegman	Catchers: 6 Andy Allanson; 26 Tim McIntosh; 11 Dave Nilsson; 5 B. J. Surhoff; Infielders: 12 Scott Fletcher; 17 Jim Gantner; 32 John Jaha; 16 Pat Listach; 4 Paul Molitor; 20 Kevin Seitzer; 9 Bill Spiers; 0 Franklin Stubbs; 2 William Suero; 39 Jim Tatum; 54 José Valentín	Outfielders: 8 Dante Bichette; 18 Alex Diaz; 24 Darryl Hamilton; 23 Greg Vaughn; 19 Robin Yount	Manager: 3 Phil Garner; Coaches: 35 Bill Castro (bullpen); 10 Duffy Dyer (third base); 22 Mike Easler (hitting); 14 Tim Foli (first base); 45 Don Rowe (pitching)

== Player stats ==
=== Batting ===
==== Starters by position ====
Note: Pos = Position; G = Games played; AB = At bats; H = Hits; Avg. = Batting average; HR = Home runs; RBI = Runs batted in

Pos	Player	G	AB	H	Avg.	HR	RBI
C	B. J. Surhoff	139	480	121	.252	4	62
1B	Franklin Stubbs	92	288	66	.229	9	42
2B	Scott Fletcher	123	386	106	.275	3	51
3B	Kevin Seitzer	148	540	146	.270	5	71
SS	Pat Listach	149	579	168	.290	1	47
LF	Greg Vaughn	141	501	114	.228	23	78
CF	Robin Yount	150	557	147	.264	8	77
RF	Dante Bichette	112	387	111	.287	5	41
DH	Paul Molitor	158	609	195	.320	12	89

==== Other batters ====
Note: G = Games played; AB = At bats; H = Hits; Avg. = Batting average; HR = Home runs; RBI = Runs batted in

Player	G	AB	H	Avg.	HR	RBI
Darryl Hamilton	128	470	140	.298	5	62
Jim Gantner	101	256	63	.246	1	18
Dave Nilsson	51	164	38	.232	4	25
John Jaha	47	133	30	.226	2	10
Tim McIntosh	35	77	14	.182	0	6
Andy Allanson	9	25	8	.320	0	0
Bill Spiers	12	16	5	.313	0	2
William Suero	18	16	3	.188	0	0
Alex Diaz	22	9	1	.111	0	1
Jim Tatum	5	8	1	.125	0	0
José Valentín	4	3	0	.000	0	1

=== Pitching ===
==== Starting pitchers ====
Note: G = Games pitched; IP = Innings pitched; W = Wins; L = Losses; ERA = Earned run average; SO = Strikeouts

Player	G	IP	W	L	ERA	SO
Bill Wegman	35	261.2	13	14	3.20	127
Jaime Navarro	34	246.0	17	11	3.33	100
Chris Bosio	33	231.1	16	6	3.62	120
Ricky Bones	31	163.1	9	10	4.57	65
Cal Eldred	14	100.1	11	2	1.79	62
Ron Robinson	8	35.1	1	4	5.86	12

==== Other pitchers ====
Note: G = Games pitched; IP = Innings pitched; W = Wins; L = Losses; ERA = Earned run average; SO = Strikeouts

Player	G	IP	W	L	ERA	SO
Bruce Ruffin	25	58.0	1	6	6.67	45

==== Relief pitchers ====
Note: G = Games pitched; W = Wins; L = Losses; SV = Saves; ERA = Earned run average; SO = Strikeouts

Player	G	W	L	SV	ERA	SO
Doug Henry	68	1	4	29	4.02	52
Jesse Orosco	59	3	1	1	3.23	40
Mike Fetters	50	5	1	2	1.87	43
Jim Austin	47	5	2	0	1.85	30
Darren Holmes	41	4	4	6	2.55	31
Dan Plesac	44	5	4	1	2.96	54
Edwin Núñez	10	1	1	0	2.63	10
Neal Heaton	1	0	0	0	0.00	1

== Awards and honors ==
- Pat Listach, American League Rookie of the Year

== Farm system ==
The Brewers' farm system consisted of seven minor league affiliates in 1992. The Stockton Ports won the California League championship.

Level	Team	League	Manager
Triple-A	Denver Zephyrs	American Association	Tony Muser
Double-A	El Paso Diablos	Texas League	Chris Bando
Class A-Advanced	Stockton Ports	California League	Tim Ireland
Class A	Beloit Brewers	Midwest League	Wayne Krenchicki
Rookie	Helena Brewers	Pioneer League	Harry Dunlop
Rookie	AZL Brewers	Arizona League	Tommy Jones
Rookie	DSL Brewers	Dominican Summer League	—
