= 1992 Kansas City Royals season =

1992 Kansas City Royals
- League: American League
- Division: West
- Ballpark: Royals Stadium
- City: Kansas City, Missouri
- Record: 72–90 (.444)
- Divisional place: 6th
- Owners: Ewing Kauffman
- General managers: Herk Robinson
- Managers: Hal McRae
- Television: WDAF-TV (Paul Splittorff, Denny Trease)
- Radio: WIBW (AM) (Denny Matthews, Fred White)

The 1992 Kansas City Royals season was the 24th season for the franchise, and their 20th at Kauffman Stadium. The Royals failed to improve on their 82–80 record from 1991 and finished fifth in the American League West with a record of 72 wins and 90 losses. Thus they were eliminated from postseason contention for the 7th consecutive season.

== Offseason ==
- December 9, 1991: Wally Joyner signed as a free agent with the Kansas City Royals.
- December 10, 1991: Rico Rossy was traded by the Atlanta Braves to the Kansas City Royals for Bobby Moore.
- December 11, 1991: Kevin McReynolds was traded by the New York Mets with Gregg Jefferies and Keith Miller to the Kansas City Royals for Bret Saberhagen and Bill Pecota.
- March 10, 1992: Kirk Gibson was traded by the Kansas City Royals to the Pittsburgh Pirates for Neal Heaton.

== Regular season ==
=== Season standings ===
AL West
Team	W	L	Pct.	GB	Home	Road
Oakland Athletics	96	66	.593	—	51‍–‍30	45‍–‍36
Minnesota Twins	90	72	.556	6	48‍–‍33	42‍–‍39
Chicago White Sox	86	76	.531	10	50‍–‍32	36‍–‍44
Texas Rangers	77	85	.475	19	36‍–‍45	41‍–‍40
California Angels	72	90	.444	24	41‍–‍40	31‍–‍50
Kansas City Royals	72	90	.444	24	44‍–‍37	28‍–‍53
Seattle Mariners	64	98	.395	32	38‍–‍43	26‍–‍55

=== Record vs. opponents ===
1992 American League record Sources:
Team	BAL	BOS	CAL	CWS	CLE	DET	KC	MIL	MIN	NYY	OAK	SEA	TEX	TOR
Baltimore	—	8–5	8–4	6–6	7–6	10–3	8–4	6–7	6–6	5–8	6–6	7–5	7–5	5–8
Boston	5–8	—	8–4	6–6	6–7	4–9	7–5	5–8	3–9	7–6	5–7	6–6	4–8	7–6
California	4–8	4–8	—	3–10	6–6	7–5	8–5	5–7	2–11	7–5	5–8	7–6	9–4	5–7
Chicago	6–6	6–6	10–3	—	7–5	10–2	7–6	5–7	8–5	8–4	5–8	4–9	5–8	5–7
Cleveland	6–7	7–6	6–6	5–7	—	5–8	5–7	5–8	6–6	7–6	6–6	7–5	5–7	6–7
Detroit	3–10	9–4	5–7	2–10	8–5	—	7–5	5–8	3–9	5–8	6–6	9–3	8–4	5–8
Kansas City	4–8	5–7	5–8	6–7	7–5	5–7	—	7–5	6–7	5–7	4–9	7–6	6–7	5–7
Milwaukee	7–6	8–5	7–5	7–5	8–5	8–5	5–7	—	6–6	6–7	7–5	8–4	7–5	8–5
Minnesota	6–6	9–3	11–2	5–8	6–6	9–3	7–6	6–6	—	7–5	5–8	8–5	6–7	5–7
New York	8–5	6–7	5–7	4–8	6–7	8–5	7–5	7–6	5–7	—	6–6	6–6	6–6	2–11
Oakland	6–6	7–5	8–5	8–5	6–6	6–6	9–4	5–7	8–5	6–6	—	12–1	9–4	6–6
Seattle	5–7	6–6	6–7	9–4	5–7	3–9	6–7	4–8	5–8	6–6	1–12	—	4–9	4–8
Texas	5–7	8–4	4–9	8–5	7–5	4–8	7–6	5–7	7–6	6–6	4–9	9–4	—	3–9
Toronto	8–5	6–7	7–5	7–5	7–6	8–5	7–5	5–8	7–5	11–2	6–6	8–4	9–3	—

=== Notable transactions ===
- April 3, 1992: Josías Manzanillo was signed as a free agent with the Kansas City Royals.
- June 1, 1992: Johnny Damon was drafted by the Kansas City Royals in the 1st round (35th pick) of the 1992 amateur draft. Player signed June 23, 1992.
- July 21, 1992: Mark Davis was traded by the Kansas City Royals to the Atlanta Braves for Juan Berenguer.
- August 6, 1992: Juan Samuel was signed as a free agent with the Kansas City Royals.

=== Roster ===
1992 Kansas City Royals
Roster
Pitchers: 55 Kevin Appier; 27 Luis Aquino; 48 Juan Berenguer; 52 Mike Boddicker; 48 Mark Davis; 36 Tom Gordon; 23 Mark Gubicza; 33,42 Chris Haney; 26,46 Neal Heaton; 37 Joel Johnston; 57 Mike Magnante; 28 Rusty Meacham; 53 Dennis Moeller; 21 Jeff Montgomery; 58 Hipólito Pichardo; 54 Ed Pierce; 47 Dennis Rasmussen; 38 Rick Reed; 50 Bill Sampen; 26 Rich Sauveur; 49 Steve Shifflett; 40 Curt Young	Catchers: 15 Mike Macfarlane; 24 Brent Mayne; 2 Bob Melvin; Infielders: 5 George Brett; 13 David Howard; 9 Gregg Jefferies; 12 Wally Joyner; 16 Keith Miller; 32 Rico Rossy; 3 Terry Shumpert; 30 Curtis Wilkerson	Outfielders: 19 Jeff Conine; 8 Jim Eisenreich; 29 Chris Gwynn; 40 Kevin Koslofski; 56 Brian McRae; 22 Kevin McReynolds; 51 Harvey Pulliam; 17 Juan Samuel; 25 Gary Thurman	Manager: 11 Hal McRae; Coaches: 44 Glenn Ezell (Bench); 41 Adrian Garrett (Third Base); 43 Guy Hansen (Pitching); 18 Joe Jones (Bench); 35 Lynn Jones (First Base); 42 Bruce Kison (Bullpen); 45 Lee May (Hitting)

== Player stats ==
=== Batting ===
==== Starters by position ====
Note: Pos = Position; G = Games played; AB = At bats; H = Hits; Avg. = Batting average; HR = Home runs; RBI = Runs batted in

Pos.	Player	G	AB	H	Avg.	HR	RBI
C	Mike Macfarlane	129	402	94	.234	17	48
1B	Wally Joyner	149	572	154	.269	9	66
2B	Keith Miller	106	416	118	.284	4	38
3B	Gregg Jefferies	152	604	172	.285	10	75
SS	David Howard	74	219	49	.224	1	18
LF	Kevin McReynolds	109	373	92	.247	13	49
CF	Brian McRae	149	533	119	.223	4	52
RF	Jim Eisenreich	113	353	95	.269	2	28
DH	George Brett	152	592	169	.285	7	61

==== Other batters ====
Note: G = Games played; AB = At bats; H = Hits; Avg. = Batting average; HR = Home runs; RBI = Runs batted in

Player	G	AB	H	HR	RBI	Avg.
Curt Wilkerson	111	296	74	.250	2	29
Brent Mayne	82	213	48	.225	0	18
Gary Thurman	88	200	49	.245	0	20
Rico Rossy	59	149	32	.215	1	12
Kevin Koslofski	55	133	33	.248	3	13
Juan Samuel	29	102	29	.284	0	8
Terry Shumpert	36	94	14	.149	1	11
Jeff Conine	28	91	23	.253	0	9
Chris Gwynn	34	84	24	.286	1	7
Bob Melvin	32	70	22	.314	0	6
Harvey Pulliam	4	5	1	.200	0	0

=== Pitching ===
==== Starting pitchers ====
Note: G = Games pitched; IP = Innings pitched; W = Wins; L = Losses; ERA = Earned run average; SO = Strikeouts

Player	G	IP	W	L	ERA	SO
Kevin Appier	30	208.1	15	8	2.46	150
Hipólito Pichardo	31	143.2	9	6	3.95	59
Mark Gubicza	18	111.1	7	6	3.72	81
Rick Reed	19	100.1	3	7	3.68	49
Luis Aquino	15	67.2	3	6	4.52	11
Chris Haney	7	42.0	2	3	3.86	27
Dennis Rasmussen	5	37.2	4	1	1.43	12

==== Other pitchers ====
Note: G = Games pitched; IP = Innings pitched; W = Wins; L = Losses; ERA = Earned run average; SO = Strikeouts

Player	G	IP	W	L	ERA	SO
Tom Gordon	40	117.2	6	10	4.59	98
Mike Magnante	44	89.1	4	9	4.94	31
Mike Boddicker	29	86.2	1	4	4.98	47
Mark Davis	13	36.1	1	3	7.18	19
Curt Young	10	24.1	1	2	5.18	7
Bill Sampen	8	19.2	0	2	3.66	14
Dennis Moeller	5	18.0	0	3	7.00	6
Ed Pierce	2	5.1	0	0	3.38	3

==== Relief pitchers ====
Note: G = Games pitched; W = Wins; L = Losses; SV = Saves; ERA = Earned run average; SO = Strikeouts

Player	G	W	L	SV	ERA	SO
Jeff Montgomery	65	1	6	39	2.18	69
Rusty Meacham	64	10	4	2	2.74	64
Steve Shifflett	34	1	4	0	2.60	25
Neal Heaton	31	3	1	0	4.17	29
Juan Berenguer	19	1	4	0	5.64	26
Rich Sauveur	8	0	1	0	4.40	7
Joel Johnston	5	0	0	0	13.50	0

== Farm system ==
Level	Team	League	Manager
AAA	Omaha Royals	American Association	Jeff Cox
AA	Memphis Chicks	Southern League	Brian Poldberg
A	Baseball City Royals	Florida State League	Ron Johnson
A	Appleton Foxes	Midwest League	Tom Poquette
A-Short Season	Eugene Emeralds	Northwest League	Bobby Meacham
Rookie	GCL Royals	Gulf Coast League	Mike Jirschele

LEAGUE CHAMPIONS: GCL Royals
