= 1992 Cleveland Indians season =

1992 Cleveland Indians
- League: American League
- Division: East
- Ballpark: Cleveland Municipal Stadium
- City: Cleveland, Ohio
- Record: 76–86 (.469)
- Divisional place: 4th
- Owners: Richard Jacobs
- General managers: John Hart
- Managers: Mike Hargrove
- Television: WUAB; Jack Corrigan, Mike Hegan; SportsChannel; John Sanders, Rick Manning
- Radio: WKNR (1220 AM); Herb Score, Tom Hamilton

The 1992 Cleveland Indians season was the 92nd season for the franchise. The Indians were named "Organization of the Year" by Baseball America. in 1992, in response to the appearance of offensive bright spots and an improving farm system.

== Offseason ==
- October 7, 1991: Mike York was released by the Indians.
- November 15, 1991: Greg Swindell was traded by the Indians to the Cincinnati Reds for Jack Armstrong, Scott Scudder, and Joe Turek (minors).
- November 20, 1991: Derek Lilliquist was selected off waivers by the Indians from the San Diego Padres.
- December 6, 1991: Jesse Orosco was sent by the Indians to the Milwaukee Brewers as part of a conditional deal.
- December 9, 1991: Pete Rose Jr. was drafted by the Indians from the Chicago White Sox in the 1991 rule 5 draft.
- December 10, 1991: Willie Blair and Eddie Taubensee were traded by the Indians to the Houston Astros for Kenny Lofton and Dave Rohde.
- January 27, 1992: Brook Jacoby was signed as a free agent by the Indians.

== Regular season ==
=== Season standings ===
AL East
Team	W	L	Pct.	GB	Home	Road
Toronto Blue Jays	96	66	.593	—	53‍–‍28	43‍–‍38
Milwaukee Brewers	92	70	.568	4	53‍–‍28	39‍–‍42
Baltimore Orioles	89	73	.549	7	43‍–‍38	46‍–‍35
Cleveland Indians	76	86	.469	20	41‍–‍40	35‍–‍46
New York Yankees	76	86	.469	20	41‍–‍40	35‍–‍46
Detroit Tigers	75	87	.463	21	38‍–‍42	37‍–‍45
Boston Red Sox	73	89	.451	23	44‍–‍37	29‍–‍52

=== Record vs. opponents ===
1992 American League record Sources:
Team	BAL	BOS	CAL	CWS	CLE	DET	KC	MIL	MIN	NYY	OAK	SEA	TEX	TOR
Baltimore	—	8–5	8–4	6–6	7–6	10–3	8–4	6–7	6–6	5–8	6–6	7–5	7–5	5–8
Boston	5–8	—	8–4	6–6	6–7	4–9	7–5	5–8	3–9	7–6	5–7	6–6	4–8	7–6
California	4–8	4–8	—	3–10	6–6	7–5	8–5	5–7	2–11	7–5	5–8	7–6	9–4	5–7
Chicago	6–6	6–6	10–3	—	7–5	10–2	7–6	5–7	8–5	8–4	5–8	4–9	5–8	5–7
Cleveland	6–7	7–6	6–6	5–7	—	5–8	5–7	5–8	6–6	7–6	6–6	7–5	5–7	6–7
Detroit	3–10	9–4	5–7	2–10	8–5	—	7–5	5–8	3–9	5–8	6–6	9–3	8–4	5–8
Kansas City	4–8	5–7	5–8	6–7	7–5	5–7	—	7–5	6–7	5–7	4–9	7–6	6–7	5–7
Milwaukee	7–6	8–5	7–5	7–5	8–5	8–5	5–7	—	6–6	6–7	7–5	8–4	7–5	8–5
Minnesota	6–6	9–3	11–2	5–8	6–6	9–3	7–6	6–6	—	7–5	5–8	8–5	6–7	5–7
New York	8–5	6–7	5–7	4–8	6–7	8–5	7–5	7–6	5–7	—	6–6	6–6	6–6	2–11
Oakland	6–6	7–5	8–5	8–5	6–6	6–6	9–4	5–7	8–5	6–6	—	12–1	9–4	6–6
Seattle	5–7	6–6	6–7	9–4	5–7	3–9	6–7	4–8	5–8	6–6	1–12	—	4–9	4–8
Texas	5–7	8–4	4–9	8–5	7–5	4–8	7–6	5–7	7–6	6–6	4–9	9–4	—	3–9
Toronto	8–5	6–7	7–5	7–5	7–6	8–5	7–5	5–8	7–5	11–2	6–6	8–4	9–3	—

=== Notable transactions ===
- April 3, 1992: Shawn Hillegas was selected off waivers from the Indians by the Toronto Blue Jays.
- April 9, 1992: Eric Plunk was signed as a free agent by the Indians.
- June 1, 1992: 1992 Major League Baseball draft
  - Paul Shuey was drafted by the Indians in the 1st round (2nd pick).
  - Matt Williams was drafted by the Indians in the 4th round.
- July 4, 1992: Alex Cole was traded by the Indians to the Pittsburgh Pirates for Tony Mitchell (minors).

=== Opening Day Lineup ===
Opening Day Starters
#	Name	Position
7	Kenny Lofton	CF
1	Glenallen Hill	DH
9	Carlos Baerga	2B
8	Albert Belle	LF
11	Paul Sorrento	1B
23	Mark Whiten	RF
15	Sandy Alomar Jr.	C
26	Brook Jacoby	3B
10	Mark Lewis	SS
41	Charles Nagy	P

=== Roster ===
1992 Cleveland Indians
Roster
Pitchers: 77 Jack Armstrong; 36 Brad Arnsberg; 63 Eric Bell; 37 Denis Boucher; 32 Mike Christopher; 39 Dennis Cook; 56 Alan Embree; 28 Derek Lilliquist; 49 José Mesa; 36 Dave Mlicki; 50 Jeff Mutis; 41 Charles Nagy; 54 Rod Nichols; 31 Steve Olin; 27 Dave Otto; 38 Eric Plunk; 48 Ted Power; 47 Scott Scudder; 57 Jeff Shaw; 53 Kevin Wickander	Catchers: 15 Sandy Alomar Jr.; 14 Jesse Levis; 0 Junior Ortiz; Infielders: 9 Carlos Baerga; 16 Félix Fermín; 2 José Hernández; 26 Brook Jacoby; 44 Reggie Jefferson; 10 Mark Lewis; 42 Carlos Martínez; 20 Tony Perezchica; 22 Dave Rohde; 11 Paul Sorrento; 25 Jim Thome; 12 Craig Worthington	Outfielders: 8 Albert Belle; 2 Alex Cole; 1 Glenallen Hill; 33 Thomas Howard; 35 Wayne Kirby; 7 Kenny Lofton; 23 Mark Whiten	Manager: 21 Mike Hargrove; Coaches: 24 Rick Adair (pitching); 51 Ken Bolek (assistant); 30 Dom Chiti (bullpen); 6 Ron Clark (bench); 34 Jose Morales (hitting); 17 Dave Nelson (first base); 55 Jeff Newman (third base)

== Statistics ==
= Indicates team leader

= Indicates league leader

=== Batting ===
Note: G = Games played; AB = At bats; R = Runs scored; H = Hits; 2B = Doubles; 3B = Triples; HR = Home runs; RBI = Runs batted in; AVG = Batting average; SB = Stolen bases

Player	G	AB	R	H	2B	3B	HR	RBI	AVG	SB
Sandy Alomar Jr.	89	299	22	75	16	0	2	26	.251	3
Carlos Baerga	161	657	92	205	32	1	20	105	.312	10
Albert Belle	153	585	81	152	23	1	34	112	.260	8
Alex Cole	41	97	11	20	1	0	0	5	.206	9
Felix Fermin	79	215	27	58	7	2	0	13	.270	0
José Hernández	3	4	0	0	0	0	0	0	.000	0
Glenallen Hill	102	369	38	89	16	1	18	49	.241	9
Thomas Howard	117	358	36	99	15	2	2	32	.277	15
Brook Jacoby	120	291	30	76	7	0	4	36	.261	0
Reggie Jefferson	24	89	8	30	6	2	1	6	.337	0
Wayne Kirby	21	18	9	3	1	0	1	1	.167	0
Jesse Levis	28	43	2	12	4	0	1	3	.279	0
Mark Lewis	122	413	44	109	21	0	5	30	.264	4
Kenny Lofton	148	576	96	164	15	8	5	42	.285	66
Carlos Martinez	69	228	23	60	9	1	5	35	.263	1
Junior Ortiz	86	244	20	61	7	0	0	24	.250	1
Tony Perezchica	18	20	2	2	1	0	0	1	.100	0
Dave Rohde	5	7	0	0	0	0	0	0	.000	0
Paul Sorrento	140	458	52	123	24	1	18	60	.269	0
Jim Thome	40	117	8	24	3	1	2	12	.205	2
Mark Whiten	148	508	73	129	19	4	9	43	.254	16
Craig Worthington	9	24	0	4	0	0	0	2	.167	0
Team totals	162	5620	674	1495	227	24	127	637	.266	144

=== Pitching ===
Note: W = Wins; L = Losses; ERA = Earned run average; G = Games pitched; GS = Games started; SV = Saves; IP = Innings pitched; H = Hits allowed; R = Runs allowed; ER = Earned runs allowed; BB = Walks allowed; K = Strikeouts

Player	W	L	ERA	G	GS	SV	IP	H	R	ER	BB	K
Jack Armstrong	6	15	4.64	35	23	0	166.2	176	100	86	67	114
Brad Arnsberg	0	0	11.81	8	0	0	10.2	13	14	14	11	5
Eric Bell	0	2	7.63	7	1	0	15.1	22	13	13	9	10
Denis Boucher	2	2	6.37	8	7	0	41.0	48	29	29	20	17
Mike Christopher	0	0	3.00	10	0	0	18.0	17	8	6	10	13
Dennis Cook	5	7	3.82	32	25	0	158.0	156	79	67	50	96
Alan Embree	0	2	7.00	4	4	0	18.0	19	14	14	8	12
Derek Lilliquist	5	3	1.75	71	0	6	61.2	39	13	12	18	47
José Mesa	4	4	4.16	15	15	0	93.0	92	45	43	43	40
Dave Mlicki	0	2	4.98	4	4	0	21.2	23	14	12	16	16
Jeff Mutis	0	2	9.53	3	2	0	11.1	24	14	12	6	8
Charles Nagy	17	10	2.96	33	33	0	252.0	245	91	83	57	169
Rod Nichols	4	3	4.53	30	9	0	105.1	114	58	53	31	56
Steve Olin	8	5	2.34	72	0	29	88.1	80	25	23	27	47
Dave Otto	5	9	7.06	18	16	0	80.1	110	64	63	33	32
Eric Plunk	9	6	3.64	58	0	4	71.2	61	31	29	38	50
Ted Power	3	3	2.54	64	0	6	99.1	88	33	28	35	51
Scott Scudder	6	10	5.28	23	22	0	109.0	134	80	64	55	51
Jeff Shaw	0	1	8.22	2	1	0	7.2	7	7	7	4	3
Kevin Wickander	2	0	3.07	44	0	1	41.0	39	14	14	28	38
Team totals	76	86	4.11	162	162	46	1470.0	1507	746	671	566	890

== Award winners ==
All-Star Game

- Sandy Alomar Jr., starting catcher
- Carlos Baerga, reserve
- Charles Nagy, reserve

== Minor league affiliates ==
Classification level	Team	League	Managers
AAA	Colorado Springs Sky Sox	Pacific Coast League	Charlie Manuel
AA	Canton–Akron Indians	Eastern League	Brian Graham
Advanced A	Kinston Indians	Carolina League	Dave Keller
A	Columbus RedStixx	South Atlantic League	Mike Brown
Short Season A	Watertown Indians	New York–Penn League	Shawn Pender
Rookie	Burlington Indians	Appalachian League	
