= 1992 Baltimore Orioles season =

Major League Baseball season

1992 Baltimore Orioles
- League: American League
- Division: East
- Ballpark: Oriole Park at Camden Yards
- City: Baltimore, Maryland
- Record: 89–73 (.549)
- Divisional place: 3rd
- Owners: Eli Jacobs
- General managers: Roland Hemond
- Managers: Johnny Oates
- Television: WMAR-TV (Jon Miller, Brooks Robinson, Scott Garceau); Home Team Sports (Mel Proctor, John Lowenstein, Jim Palmer, Rex Barney, Tom Davis)
- Radio: WBAL (AM) (Chuck Thompson, Jon Miller, Joe Angel)

The 1992 Baltimore Orioles season was the 92nd season in Baltimore Orioles franchise history, the 39th in Baltimore, and the inaugural season at Oriole Park at Camden Yards, after having played almost 40 years at Memorial Stadium where they still play to this day. It involved the Orioles finishing third in the American League East with a record of 89 wins and 73 losses.

== Offseason ==
- November 13, 1991: Jeff Robinson was released by the Orioles.
- January 7, 1992: Amalio Carreño was signed as a free agent with the Baltimore Orioles.

== Regular season ==
The Orioles spent most of the first three months of the season battling with the Toronto Blue Jays for first place in the division. The lead switched back and forth between the two teams before the Jays took it for good on June 20. Baltimore remained in second place for the next two months, with the margin between themselves and Toronto fluctuating from between one and five games. However, the Birds faded during the September stretch and relinquished second place to the Milwaukee Brewers on September 19. Still, they were not mathematically eliminated from contention until September 27, finishing at a respectable 89–73.

In 1992, Mike Mussina played his first full season with the Orioles. He finished with an 18–5 record and a 2.54 ERA in 241 innings; his .783 win–loss percentage was the best in the American League, and his 1.79 BB/9 was second-best in the AL behind the Brewers' Chris Bosio. Mussina also pitched four shutouts, tying for second in the league behind Boston's Roger Clemens. He finished fourth in the American League Cy Young Award voting, and participated in the 1992 Major League Baseball All-Star Game in San Diego, pitching one perfect inning.

=== Oriole Park at Camden Yards ===
In 1992, with grand ceremony, the Orioles began their season in a brand new ballpark, Oriole Park at Camden Yards, and thus retiring Memorial Stadium in the major league baseball world. The ballpark was an instant success; however, the name of the new park had controversy. Many felt that since the Orioles' new home was so close to Babe Ruth's birthplace that the new park should have been named after Ruth instead of being indirectly named after the Earl of Camden, Charles Pratt, who was a Briton who never set foot on American soil. There was also the superficial connection to the fact that Ruth played for the Orioles early in his career, but the Orioles team that Ruth played for was in no way related to the Orioles team that moved to Baltimore from St. Louis. Camden Yards was built at the location of the old Camden Railway. It was the first of the "retro" major league ballparks constructed during the 1990s and early 2000s, and remains one of the most highly praised.

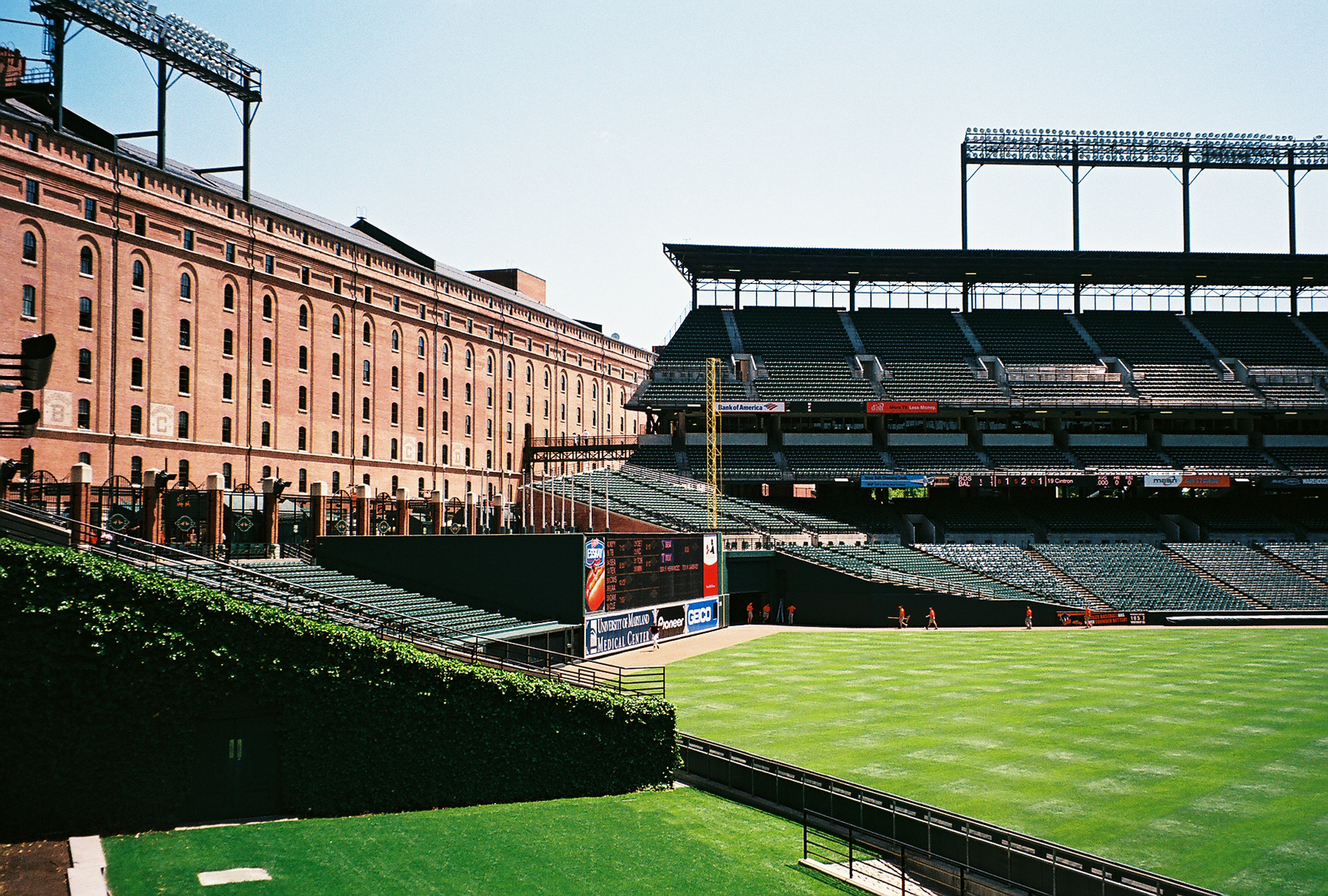
Right field and the Baltimore & Ohio Warehouse at Camden Yards.

=== Season standings ===
AL East
| Team | W | L | Pct. | GB | Home | Road |
|---|---|---|---|---|---|---|
| Toronto Blue Jays | 96 | 66 | .593 | — | 53‍–‍28 | 43‍–‍38 |
| Milwaukee Brewers | 92 | 70 | .568 | 4 | 53‍–‍28 | 39‍–‍42 |
| Baltimore Orioles | 89 | 73 | .549 | 7 | 43‍–‍38 | 46‍–‍35 |
| Cleveland Indians | 76 | 86 | .469 | 20 | 41‍–‍40 | 35‍–‍46 |
| New York Yankees | 76 | 86 | .469 | 20 | 41‍–‍40 | 35‍–‍46 |
| Detroit Tigers | 75 | 87 | .463 | 21 | 38‍–‍42 | 37‍–‍45 |
| Boston Red Sox | 73 | 89 | .451 | 23 | 44‍–‍37 | 29‍–‍52 |

=== Record vs. opponents ===
1992 American League record Sources:
| Team | BAL | BOS | CAL | CWS | CLE | DET | KC | MIL | MIN | NYY | OAK | SEA | TEX | TOR |
|---|---|---|---|---|---|---|---|---|---|---|---|---|---|---|
| Baltimore | — | 8–5 | 8–4 | 6–6 | 7–6 | 10–3 | 8–4 | 6–7 | 6–6 | 5–8 | 6–6 | 7–5 | 7–5 | 5–8 |
| Boston | 5–8 | — | 8–4 | 6–6 | 6–7 | 4–9 | 7–5 | 5–8 | 3–9 | 7–6 | 5–7 | 6–6 | 4–8 | 7–6 |
| California | 4–8 | 4–8 | — | 3–10 | 6–6 | 7–5 | 8–5 | 5–7 | 2–11 | 7–5 | 5–8 | 7–6 | 9–4 | 5–7 |
| Chicago | 6–6 | 6–6 | 10–3 | — | 7–5 | 10–2 | 7–6 | 5–7 | 8–5 | 8–4 | 5–8 | 4–9 | 5–8 | 5–7 |
| Cleveland | 6–7 | 7–6 | 6–6 | 5–7 | — | 5–8 | 5–7 | 5–8 | 6–6 | 7–6 | 6–6 | 7–5 | 5–7 | 6–7 |
| Detroit | 3–10 | 9–4 | 5–7 | 2–10 | 8–5 | — | 7–5 | 5–8 | 3–9 | 5–8 | 6–6 | 9–3 | 8–4 | 5–8 |
| Kansas City | 4–8 | 5–7 | 5–8 | 6–7 | 7–5 | 5–7 | — | 7–5 | 6–7 | 5–7 | 4–9 | 7–6 | 6–7 | 5–7 |
| Milwaukee | 7–6 | 8–5 | 7–5 | 7–5 | 8–5 | 8–5 | 5–7 | — | 6–6 | 6–7 | 7–5 | 8–4 | 7–5 | 8–5 |
| Minnesota | 6–6 | 9–3 | 11–2 | 5–8 | 6–6 | 9–3 | 7–6 | 6–6 | — | 7–5 | 5–8 | 8–5 | 6–7 | 5–7 |
| New York | 8–5 | 6–7 | 5–7 | 4–8 | 6–7 | 8–5 | 7–5 | 7–6 | 5–7 | — | 6–6 | 6–6 | 6–6 | 2–11 |
| Oakland | 6–6 | 7–5 | 8–5 | 8–5 | 6–6 | 6–6 | 9–4 | 5–7 | 8–5 | 6–6 | — | 12–1 | 9–4 | 6–6 |
| Seattle | 5–7 | 6–6 | 6–7 | 9–4 | 5–7 | 3–9 | 6–7 | 4–8 | 5–8 | 6–6 | 1–12 | — | 4–9 | 4–8 |
| Texas | 5–7 | 8–4 | 4–9 | 8–5 | 7–5 | 4–8 | 7–6 | 5–7 | 7–6 | 6–6 | 4–9 | 9–4 | — | 3–9 |
| Toronto | 8–5 | 6–7 | 7–5 | 7–5 | 7–6 | 8–5 | 7–5 | 5–8 | 7–5 | 11–2 | 6–6 | 8–4 | 9–3 | — |

=== Notable transactions ===
- August 11, 1992: Juan Bell was traded by the Orioles to the Philadelphia Phillies for Steve Scarsone.

=== Roster ===
1992 Baltimore Orioles
Roster
| Pitchers: 29 Pat Clements; 34 Storm Davis; 46 Mike Flanagan; 49 Todd Frohwirth; 31 Craig Lefferts; 55 Richie Lewis; 19 Ben McDonald; 52 José Mesa; 18 Bob Milacki; 75 Alan Mills; 35 Mike Mussina; 30 Gregg Olson; 45 Jim Poole; 53 Arthur Rhodes; 40 Rick Sutcliffe; 32 Mark Williamson | Catchers: 24 Rick Dempsey; 23 Chris Hoiles; 27 Mark Parent; 41 Jeff Tackett; Infielders: 48 Manny Alexander; 37 Glenn Davis; 10 Leo Gómez; 36 Tim Hulett; 2,67 Mark McLemore; 39 Randy Milligan; 3 Billy Ripken; 8 Cal Ripken Jr.; 43 Steve Scarsone; 21 David Segui | Outfielders: 9 Brady Anderson; 12 Mike Devereaux; 14 Chito Martínez; 11 Luis Mercedes; 6 Joe Orsulak; Other batters: 15,38 Sam Horn; 1 Tommy Shields; 28 Jack Voigt | Manager: 26 Johnny Oates; Coaches: 25 Greg Biagini (hitting); 27 Dick Bosman (pitching); 44 Elrod Hendricks (bullpen); 15 Davey Lopes (first base); 7 Cal Ripken, Sr. (third base) |

== Player stats ==
| = Indicates team leader |

| = Indicates league leader |

=== Batting ===
==== Starters by position ====
Note: Pos = Position; G = Games played; AB = At bats; H = Hits; Avg. = Batting average; HR = Home runs; RBI = Runs batted in

| Pos | Player | G | AB | H | Avg. | HR | RBI |
|---|---|---|---|---|---|---|---|
| C | Chris Hoiles | 96 | 310 | 85 | .274 | 20 | 40 |
| 1B | Randy Milligan | 137 | 462 | 111 | .240 | 11 | 53 |
| 2B | Billy Ripken | 111 | 330 | 76 | .230 | 4 | 36 |
| 3B | Leo Gómez | 137 | 468 | 124 | .265 | 17 | 64 |
| SS | Cal Ripken Jr. | 162 | 637 | 160 | .251 | 14 | 72 |
| LF | Brady Anderson | 159 | 623 | 169 | .271 | 21 | 80 |
| CF | Mike Devereaux | 156 | 653 | 180 | .276 | 24 | 107 |
| RF | Joe Orsulak | 117 | 391 | 113 | .289 | 4 | 39 |
| DH | Glenn Davis | 106 | 398 | 110 | .276 | 13 | 48 |

==== Other batters ====
Note: G = Games played; AB = At bats; H = Hits; Avg. + Batting average; HR = Home runs; RBI = Runs batted in

| Player | G | AB | H | Avg. | HR | RBI |
|---|---|---|---|---|---|---|
| Mark McLemore | 101 | 228 | 56 | .246 | 0 | 27 |
| Chito Martínez | 83 | 198 | 53 | .268 | 5 | 25 |
| David Segui | 115 | 189 | 44 | .233 | 1 | 17 |
| Jeff Tackett | 65 | 179 | 43 | .240 | 5 | 24 |
| Sam Horn | 63 | 162 | 38 | .235 | 5 | 19 |
| Tim Hulett | 57 | 142 | 41 | .289 | 2 | 21 |
| Luis Mercedes | 23 | 50 | 7 | .140 | 0 | 4 |
| Mark Parent | 17 | 34 | 8 | .235 | 2 | 4 |
| Steve Scarsone | 11 | 17 | 3 | .176 | 0 | 0 |
| Rick Dempsey | 8 | 9 | 1 | .111 | 0 | 0 |
| Manny Alexander | 4 | 5 | 1 | .200 | 0 | 0 |
| Tommy Shields | 2 | 0 | 0 | ---- | 0 | 0 |
| Jack Voigt | 1 | 0 | 0 | ---- | 0 | 0 |

=== Pitching ===
==== Starting pitchers ====
Note: G = Games pitched; IP = Innings pitched; W = Wins; L = Losses; ERA = Earned run average; SO = Strikeouts

| Player | G | IP | W | L | ERA | SO |
|---|---|---|---|---|---|---|
| Mike Mussina | 32 | 241.0 | 18 | 5 | 2.54 | 130 |
| Rick Sutcliffe | 36 | 237.1 | 16 | 15 | 4.47 | 109 |
| Ben McDonald | 35 | 227.0 | 13 | 13 | 4.24 | 158 |
| Bob Milacki | 23 | 115.2 | 6 | 8 | 5.84 | 51 |
| Arthur Rhodes | 15 | 94.1 | 7 | 5 | 3.63 | 77 |
| José Mesa | 13 | 67.2 | 3 | 8 | 5.19 | 22 |
| Craig Lefferts | 5 | 33.0 | 1 | 3 | 4.09 | 23 |
| Richie Lewis | 2 | 6.2 | 0 | 2 | 10.80 | 4 |

==== Relief pitchers ====
Note: G = Games pitched; W = Wins; L = Losses; SV = Saves; ERA = Earned run average; SO = Strikeouts

| Player | G | W | L | SV | ERA | SO |
|---|---|---|---|---|---|---|
| Gregg Olson | 60 | 1 | 5 | 36 | 2.05 | 58 |
| Todd Frohwirth | 65 | 4 | 3 | 4 | 2.46 | 58 |
| Storm Davis | 48 | 7 | 3 | 4 | 3.43 | 53 |
| Mike Flanagan | 42 | 0 | 0 | 0 | 8.05 | 17 |
| Alan Mills | 35 | 10 | 4 | 2 | 2.61 | 60 |
| Pat Clements | 23 | 2 | 0 | 0 | 3.28 | 9 |
| Mark Williamson | 12 | 0 | 0 | 1 | 0.96 | 14 |
| Jim Poole | 6 | 0 | 0 | 0 | 0.00 | 3 |

== Awards and honors ==
- Cal Ripken Jr., shortstop, Roberto Clemente Award

== Farm system ==
| Level | Team | League | Manager |
|---|---|---|---|
| AAA | Rochester Red Wings | International League | Jerry Narron |
| AA | Hagerstown Suns | Eastern League | Don Buford |
| A | Frederick Keys | Carolina League | Bob Miscik |
| A | Kane County Cougars | Midwest League | Joel Youngblood |
| Rookie | Bluefield Orioles | Appalachian League | Mike O'Berry |
| Rookie | GCL Orioles | Gulf Coast League | Phillip Wellman |

LEAGUE CHAMPIONS: Bluefield
