= Matt Young =

American baseball player (born 1958)

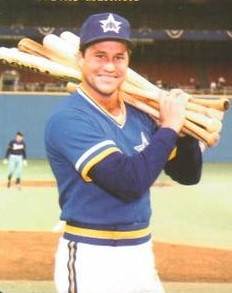
- Young with the Seattle Mariners
- Pitcher
- Born: August 9, 1958 (age 68); Pasadena, California, U.S.
- Batted: Left Threw: Left

MLB debut
- April 6, 1983, for the Seattle Mariners

Last MLB appearance
- August 6, 1993, for the Cleveland Indians

MLB statistics
- Win–loss record: 55–95
- Earned run average: 4.40
- Strikeouts: 857
- Stats at Baseball Reference

Teams
- Seattle Mariners (1983–1986); Los Angeles Dodgers (1987); Oakland Athletics (1989); Seattle Mariners (1990); Boston Red Sox (1991–1992); Cleveland Indians (1993)

Career highlights and awards
- All-Star (1983); World Series champion (1989)

Matthew John Young (born August 9, 1958) is an American former professional baseball pitcher. Young played eleven seasons in Major League Baseball for a variety of teams over his career, was an MLB All-Star in his rookie year, and is best known for his unofficial no-hitter against the Cleveland Indians while a member of the Boston Red Sox.

== Bio ==
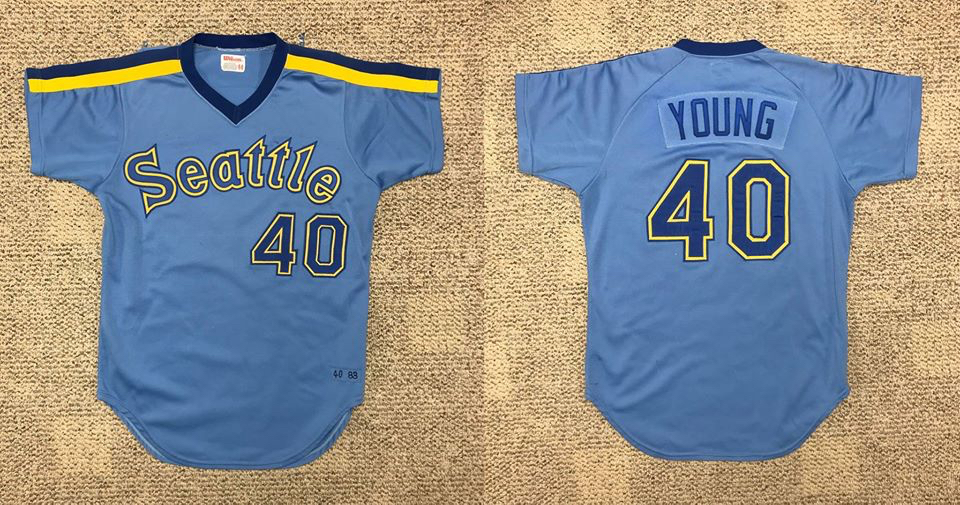
1983 Seattle Mariners #40 Matt Young game worn road jersey

Young was born in Pasadena, California in 1958, and attended the University of California, Los Angeles (UCLA). While at UCLA, he was drafted by the Seattle Mariners in the second round (32nd overall) of the 1980 Major League Baseball draft. He made his major league debut in 1983 with the Mariners, eventually finishing the season with an 11–15 record games over 203 1/3 innings, with a 3.27 earned run average in 33 games (32 starts), good enough to rank in the top ten for ERA that season. He represented the Mariners in the 1983 Major League Baseball All-Star Game, where he pitched a scoreless eighth inning facing Johnny Bench, Darrell Evans and Pedro Guerrero.

Young, however, struggled to replicate that success, underwent "Tommy John surgery" and was traded twice, from the Mariners to the Los Angeles Dodgers, then to the Oakland Athletics in a three-team trade with the New York Mets, appearing in a game in relief during the 1989 American League Championship Series. Eventually, Young hit free agency, and signed a three-year, $6.35 million contract with the Boston Red Sox on December 4, 1990.

Young pitched for the Red Sox for two seasons before being released days before the start of the 1993 season. He became part of baseball history during his tenure with the Red Sox. On April 12, 1992, Young faced the Cleveland Indians in the first game of a doubleheader, allowed two runs on seven walks and an error by shortstop Luis Rivera en route to the fourth no-hitter by a losing pitcher. On that day, Roger Clemens pitched a two-hit shutout in the second game of the doubleheader, giving Young and Clemens the Major League Baseball record for the fewest hits (2) allowed in a doubleheader. While Young sent the ball to the Baseball Hall of Fame in Cooperstown, New York, Major League Baseball, in a rule created prior to the season, did not recognize the performance as a true no-hitter, as Young, playing for the losing team on the road, only pitched eight innings in his complete game loss. According to Seymour Siwoff, who was on Baseball's Committee for Statistical Accuracy, the feat could not be listed with the "pure" no-hitters because "Young didn't get the chance to go out and pitch the ninth...who knows what would have happened if he did." Had the no-hitter been officially recognized, it would have been the first no-hitter by a Boston pitcher since Dave Morehead did so in 1965, also against the Indians, and was the fifteenth time, at that point, that a Red Sox pitcher had completed a game without allowing a hit.

Young was released by the Red Sox in 1993, appeared in 22 games for the Indians in 1993, and finally spent a month with the Syracuse Chiefs, a minor league team in the Toronto Blue Jays organization, before being released a final time in September 1993.

== See also ==
- List of Major League Baseball single-inning strikeout leaders
