= Ed Pierce (baseball) =

American baseball player (born 1968)

- Pitcher
- Born: October 6, 1968 (age 56); Arcadia, California, U.S.
- Batted: Left Threw: Left

MLB debut
- September 6, 1992, for the Kansas City Royals

Last MLB appearance
- September 12, 1992, for the Kansas City Royals

MLB statistics
- Win–loss record: 0–0
- Earned run average: 3.38
- Strikeouts: 3
- Stats at Baseball Reference

Teams
- Kansas City Royals (1992)

Edward John Pierce (born October 6, 1968) is a former Major League Baseball pitcher who played for one season. He pitched in two games for the Kansas City Royals during the 1992 Kansas City Royals season.
