= 1992 Chicago White Sox season =

1992 Chicago White Sox
- League: American League
- Division: West
- Ballpark: Comiskey Park
- City: Chicago
- Owners: Jerry Reinsdorf
- General managers: Ron Schueler
- Managers: Gene Lamont
- Television: WGN-TV; SportsChannel Chicago (Ken Harrelson, Tom Paciorek)
- Radio: WMAQ (AM) (John Rooney, Ed Farmer); WIND (AM) (Hector Molina, Chico Carrasquel)

The 1992 Chicago White Sox season was the White Sox's 94th season. They finished with a record of 86–76, good enough for third place in the American League West, 10 games behind the first place Oakland Athletics.

== Offseason ==
- December 4, 1991: Dan Pasqua was signed as a free agent by the White Sox.
- December 9, 1991: Pete Rose Jr. was drafted from the White Sox by the Cleveland Indians in the 1991 rule 5 draft.
- January 10, 1992: Bob Wickman, Domingo Jean and Mélido Pérez were traded by the White Sox to the New York Yankees for Steve Sax.

== Regular season ==
=== Season standings ===
AL West
Team	W	L	Pct.	GB	Home	Road
Oakland Athletics	96	66	.593	—	51‍–‍30	45‍–‍36
Minnesota Twins	90	72	.556	6	48‍–‍33	42‍–‍39
Chicago White Sox	86	76	.531	10	50‍–‍32	36‍–‍44
Texas Rangers	77	85	.475	19	36‍–‍45	41‍–‍40
California Angels	72	90	.444	24	41‍–‍40	31‍–‍50
Kansas City Royals	72	90	.444	24	44‍–‍37	28‍–‍53
Seattle Mariners	64	98	.395	32	38‍–‍43	26‍–‍55

=== Record vs. opponents ===
1992 American League record Sources:
Team	BAL	BOS	CAL	CWS	CLE	DET	KC	MIL	MIN	NYY	OAK	SEA	TEX	TOR
Baltimore	—	8–5	8–4	6–6	7–6	10–3	8–4	6–7	6–6	5–8	6–6	7–5	7–5	5–8
Boston	5–8	—	8–4	6–6	6–7	4–9	7–5	5–8	3–9	7–6	5–7	6–6	4–8	7–6
California	4–8	4–8	—	3–10	6–6	7–5	8–5	5–7	2–11	7–5	5–8	7–6	9–4	5–7
Chicago	6–6	6–6	10–3	—	7–5	10–2	7–6	5–7	8–5	8–4	5–8	4–9	5–8	5–7
Cleveland	6–7	7–6	6–6	5–7	—	5–8	5–7	5–8	6–6	7–6	6–6	7–5	5–7	6–7
Detroit	3–10	9–4	5–7	2–10	8–5	—	7–5	5–8	3–9	5–8	6–6	9–3	8–4	5–8
Kansas City	4–8	5–7	5–8	6–7	7–5	5–7	—	7–5	6–7	5–7	4–9	7–6	6–7	5–7
Milwaukee	7–6	8–5	7–5	7–5	8–5	8–5	5–7	—	6–6	6–7	7–5	8–4	7–5	8–5
Minnesota	6–6	9–3	11–2	5–8	6–6	9–3	7–6	6–6	—	7–5	5–8	8–5	6–7	5–7
New York	8–5	6–7	5–7	4–8	6–7	8–5	7–5	7–6	5–7	—	6–6	6–6	6–6	2–11
Oakland	6–6	7–5	8–5	8–5	6–6	6–6	9–4	5–7	8–5	6–6	—	12–1	9–4	6–6
Seattle	5–7	6–6	6–7	9–4	5–7	3–9	6–7	4–8	5–8	6–6	1–12	—	4–9	4–8
Texas	5–7	8–4	4–9	8–5	7–5	4–8	7–6	5–7	7–6	6–6	4–9	9–4	—	3–9
Toronto	8–5	6–7	7–5	7–5	7–6	8–5	7–5	5–8	7–5	11–2	6–6	8–4	9–3	—

=== 1992 Opening Day lineup ===
- Tim Raines, LF
- Steve Sax, 2B
- Robin Ventura, 3B
- Frank Thomas, 1B
- George Bell, DH
- Mike Huff, RF
- Ron Karkovice, C
- Lance Johnson, CF
- Ozzie Guillén, SS
- Jack McDowell, P

=== Transactions ===
- March 10, 1992: Bo Jackson was signed as a free agent by the White Sox.
- March 30, 1992: Sammy Sosa and Ken Patterson were traded by the White Sox to the Chicago Cubs for George Bell.
- April 3, 1992: Shawn Abner was signed as a free agent with the Chicago White Sox.
- June 1, 1992: A. J. Hinch was drafted by the Chicago White Sox in the 2nd round of the 1992 amateur draft, but did not sign.
- August 10, 1992: Keith Shepherd was traded by the White Sox to the Philadelphia Phillies for Dale Sveum.

=== Roster ===
1992 Chicago White Sox
Roster
Pitchers: 40 Wilson Álvarez; 50 Brian Drahman; 54 Mike Dunne; 32 Alex Fernandez; 39 Roberto Hernández; 27 Greg Hibbard; 49 Charlie Hough; 34 Terry Leach; 25 Kirk McCaskill; 29 Jack McDowell; 22 Donn Pall; 31 Scott Radinsky; 37 Bobby Thigpen	Catchers: 72 Carlton Fisk; 20 Ron Karkovice; 5 Matt Merullo; 48 Nelson Santovenia; Infielders: 38 Esteban Beltré; 28 Joey Cora; 57 Chris Cron; 14 Craig Grebeck; 13 Ozzie Guillén; 7 Steve Sax; 42 Dale Sveum; 35 Frank Thomas; 23 Robin Ventura	Outfielders: 45 Shawn Abner; 36 Scott Hemond; 12 Mike Huff; 10 Shawn Jeter; 1 Lance Johnson; 24 Warren Newson; 44 Dan Pasqua; 30 Tim Raines; Other Positions: 21 George Bell	Manager: 33 Gene Lamont; Coaches: 18 Terry Bevington (First Base); 36 Jackie Brown (Pitching); 6 Walt Hriniak (Hitting); 17 Doug Mansolino (Third Base); 15 Joe Nossek (Bench); 26 Mike Squires (Bullpen)

== Player stats ==
=== Batting ===
Note: G = Games played; AB = At bats; R = Runs scored; H = Hits; 2B = Doubles; 3B = Triples; HR = Home runs; RBI = Runs batted in; BB = Base on balls; SO = Strikeouts; AVG = Batting average; SB = Stolen bases

Player	G	AB	R	H	2B	3B	HR	RBI	BB	SO	AVG	SB
Shawn Abner, OF	97	208	21	58	10	1	1	16	12	35	.279	1
George Bell, DH, LF	155	627	74	160	27	0	25	112	31	97	.255	5
Esteban Beltre, SS	49	110	21	21	2	0	1	10	3	18	.191	1
Joey Cora, 2B	68	122	27	30	7	1	0	9	22	13	.246	10
Chris Cron, 1B, LF	6	10	0	0	0	0	0	0	0	4	.000	0
Carlton Fisk, C	62	188	12	43	4	1	3	21	23	38	.229	3
Craig Grebeck, SS, 3B	88	287	24	77	21	2	3	35	30	34	.268	0
Ozzie Guillén, SS	12	40	5	8	4	0	0	7	1	5	.200	1
Scott Hemond, LF, DH	8	13	1	3	1	0	0	1	1	6	.231	0
Mike Huff, OF	60	115	13	24	5	0	0	8	10	24	.209	1
Shawn Jeter, OF	13	18	1	2	0	0	0	0	0	7	.111	0
Lance Johnson, CF	157	567	67	158	15	12	3	47	34	33	.279	41
Ron Karkovice, C	123	342	39	81	12	1	13	50	30	89	.237	10
Matt Merullo, C, DH	24	50	3	9	1	1	0	3	1	8	.180	0
Warren Newson, OF, DH	63	136	19	30	3	0	1	11	37	38	.221	3
Dan Pasqua, RF, 1B	93	265	26	56	16	1	6	33	36	57	.211	0
Tim Raines, LF	144	551	102	162	22	9	7	54	81	48	.294	45
Nelson Santovenia, C	2	3	1	1	0	0	1	2	0	0	.333	0
Steve Sax, 2B	143	567	74	134	26	4	4	47	43	42	.236	30
Dale Sveum, SS	40	114	15	25	9	0	2	12	12	29	.219	1
Frank Thomas, 1B, DH	160	573	108	185	46	2	24	115	122	88	.323	6
Robin Ventura, 3B	157	592	85	167	38	1	16	93	93	71	.282	2
Team totals	162	5498	738	1434	269	36	110	686	622	784	.261	160

=== Pitching ===
Note: W = Wins; L = Losses; ERA = Earned run average; G = Games pitched; GS = Games started; SV = Saves; IP = Innings pitched; H = Hits allowed; R = Runs allowed; ER = Earned runs allowed; HR = Home runs allowed; BB = Walks allowed; K = Strikeouts

Player	W	L	ERA	G	GS	SV	IP	H	R	ER	HR	BB	K
Wilson Álvarez	5	3	5.20	34	9	1	100.1	103	64	58	12	67	66
Brian Drahman	0	0	2.57	5	0	0	7.0	6	3	2	0	2	1
Mike Dunne	2	0	4.26	4	1	0	12.2	12	7	6	0	7	6
Alex Fernandez	8	11	4.27	29	29	0	187.2	199	100	89	21	53	95
Roberto Hernández	7	3	1.65	43	0	12	71.0	45	15	13	4	21	68
Greg Hibbard	10	7	4.40	31	28	1	176.0	187	92	86	17	59	69
Charlie Hough	7	12	3.93	27	27	0	176.1	160	88	77	19	68	76
Terry Leach	6	5	1.95	51	0	0	73.2	57	17	16	2	25	22
Kirk McCaskill	12	13	4.18	34	34	0	209.0	193	116	97	11	100	109
Jack McDowell	20	10	3.18	34	34	0	260.2	247	95	92	21	94	178
Donn Pall	5	2	4.93	39	0	1	73.0	79	43	40	9	35	27
Scott Radinsky	3	7	2.73	68	0	15	59.1	54	21	18	3	39	48
Bobby Thigpen	1	3	4.75	55	0	22	55.0	58	29	29	4	38	45
Team totals	86	76	3.82	162	162	52	1461.2	1400	690	621	123	598	810

== Awards and honors ==
All-Star Game

- Jack McDowell
- Robin Ventura

== Farm system ==
Level	Team	League	Manager
AAA	Vancouver Canadians	Pacific Coast League	Rick Renick
AA	Birmingham Barons	Southern League	Tony Franklin
A	Sarasota White Sox	Florida State League	Rick Patterson
A	South Bend White Sox	Midwest League	Terry Francona
A-Short Season	Utica Blue Sox	New York–Penn League	Fred Kendall
Rookie	GCL White Sox	Gulf Coast League	Mike Rojas
