= Tommy Shields =

American baseball player and coach (born 1964)

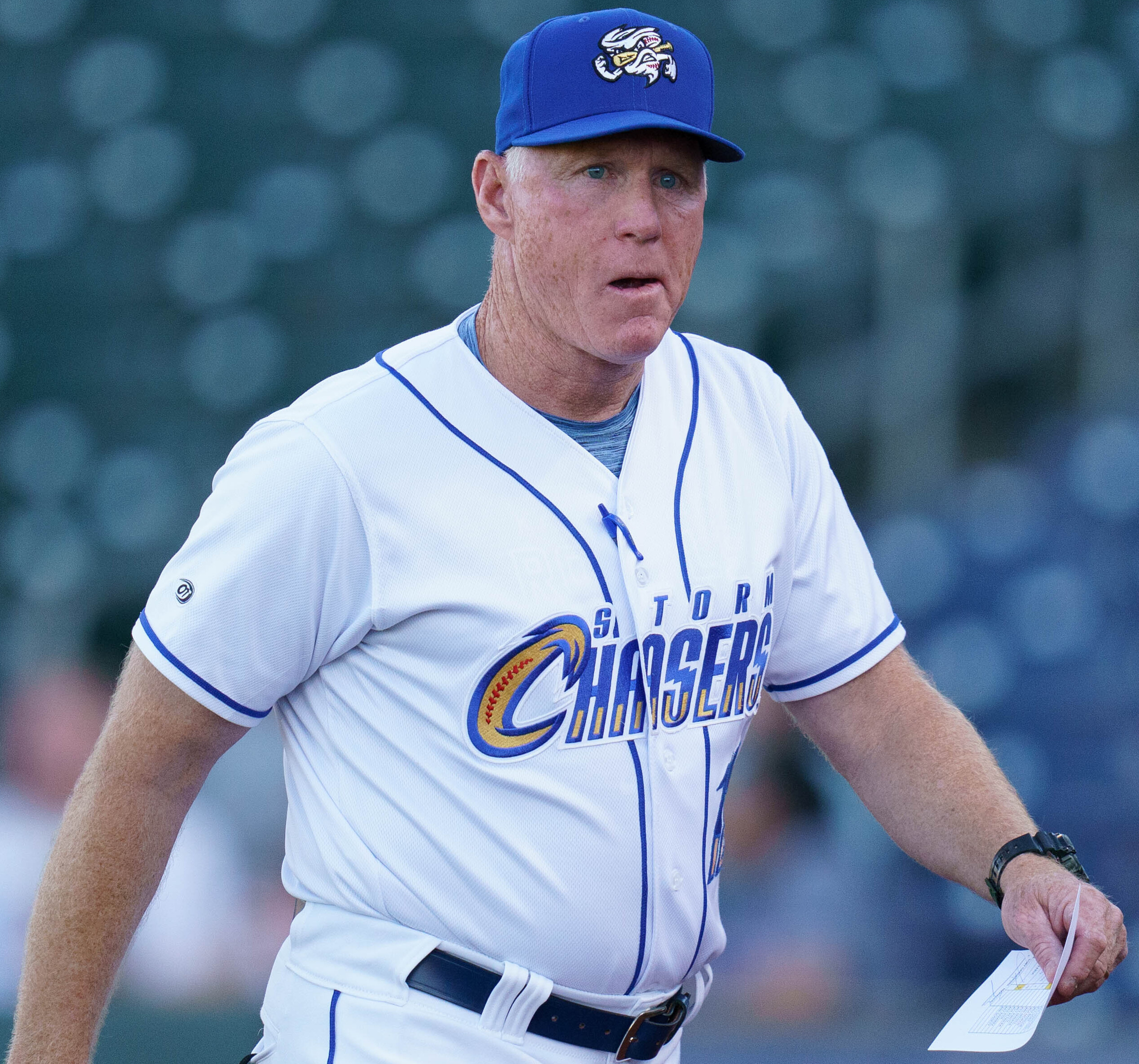
- Shields with the Omaha Storm Chasers in 2022
- Infielder
- Born: August 14, 1964 (age 61); Fairfax, Virginia, U.S.
- Batted: Left Threw: Right

MLB debut
- July 25, 1992, for the Baltimore Orioles

Last MLB appearance
- October 3, 1993, for the Chicago Cubs

MLB statistics
- Batting average: .176
- Home runs: 0
- Runs batted in: 1
- Stats at Baseball Reference

Teams
- Baltimore Orioles (1992); Chicago Cubs (1993)

Thomas Charles Shields (born August 14, 1964) is an American professional baseball coach and former infielder. Shields was an infielder in Major League Baseball (MLB) from 1992 to 1993 for the Baltimore Orioles and Chicago Cubs. He played in Minor League Baseball from 1986 to 1994, starting out in the Pittsburgh Pirates system. Shields was most recently the manager of the Northwest Arkansas Naturals.

Shields has been a baseball coach for 29 years. He previously served as the manager of the Delmarva Shorebirds, Burlington Royals and Wilmington Blue Rocks. He was also the bench coach for the Omaha Storm Chasers. He has worked in the minor league organizations of the Kansas City Royals, Orioles, St. Louis Cardinals, Atlanta Braves, and Washington Nationals.

Shields and his wife, Melonni, have four children. He lives in Lititz, Pennsylvania.
