= Doug Henry (baseball) =

American baseball player & coach (born 1963)

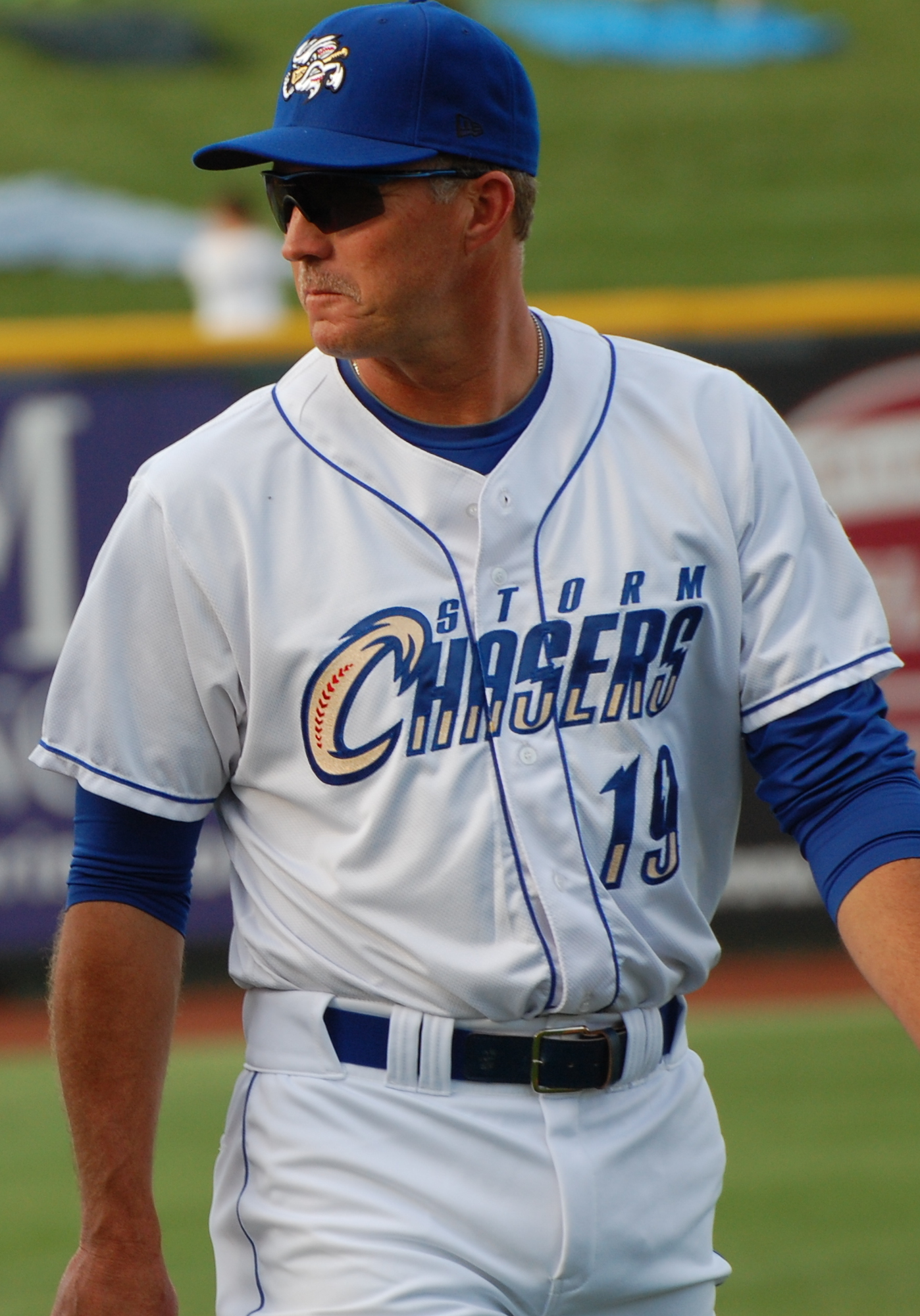
- Henry with the Omaha Storm Chasers in 2012
- Pitcher
- Born: December 10, 1963 (age 62); Sacramento, California, U.S.
- Batted: Right Threw: Right

MLB debut
- July 15, 1991, for the Milwaukee Brewers

Last MLB appearance
- October 3, 2001, for the Kansas City Royals

MLB statistics
- Win–loss record: 34–42
- Earned run average: 4.19
- Strikeouts: 541
- Saves: 82
- Stats at Baseball Reference

Teams
- Milwaukee Brewers (1991–1994); New York Mets (1995–1996); San Francisco Giants (1997); Houston Astros (1998–2000); San Francisco Giants (2000); Kansas City Royals (2001); As Coach: Kansas City Royals (2013-2017)
Medals
Baseball
Representing the United States
Pan American Games
Bronze medal – third place	1983 Caracas	Team
Amateur World Series
Bronze medal – third place	1984 Cuba	Team

Richard Douglas Henry (born December 10, 1963) is an American former professional baseball relief pitcher and current coach.

== Career ==
Henry played for the Milwaukee Brewers (1991–94), New York Mets (1995–96), San Francisco Giants (1997 and 2000), Houston Astros (1998–2000) and Kansas City Royals (2001). He was acquired by the Mets on November 30, 1994 in a transaction that was completed when the Brewers received minor-league catcher Javier Gonzalez on December 6 and Fernando Viña sixteen days later on December 22.

He rejoined the Royals organization as the pitching coach for the Burlington Bees in the Midwest League after spending three years as a pitching coach in the Atlanta Braves organization. During the 2007 season, Henry was the pitching coach for the Single-A Rome Braves in the South Atlantic League.

He helped the Giants win the 1997 and 2000 National League Western Division and the Astros win the 1998 and 1999 NL Central Division.

Henry finished tied for eighth in voting for 1991 American League Rookie of the Year for having a 2–1 win-loss record, 32 games, 25 games finished, 15 saves, 36 innings pitched, 16 hits allowed, 4 runs allowed, 4 earned runs allowed, 1 home run allowed, 14 walks, 28 strikeouts, 137 batters faced, 1 intentional walk and a 1.00 earned run average.

In 11 seasons he had a 34–42 win–loss record, 582 games, 290 games finished, 82 saves, 665 2/3 innings pitched, 611 hits allowed, 346 runs allowed, 310 earned runs allowed, 83 home runs allowed, 341 walks, 541 strikeouts, 17 hit batsmen, 41 wild pitches, 2,911 batters faced, 42 intentional Walks, 2 balks and a 4.19 ERA.

In 2026, he was named as the assistant pitching coach for the Rocket City Trash Pandas the Double-A affiliate of the Los Angeles Angels.

Henry lives in Hartland, Wisconsin.
