= Luis Rivera (infielder) =

Puerto Rican baseball player (born 1964)

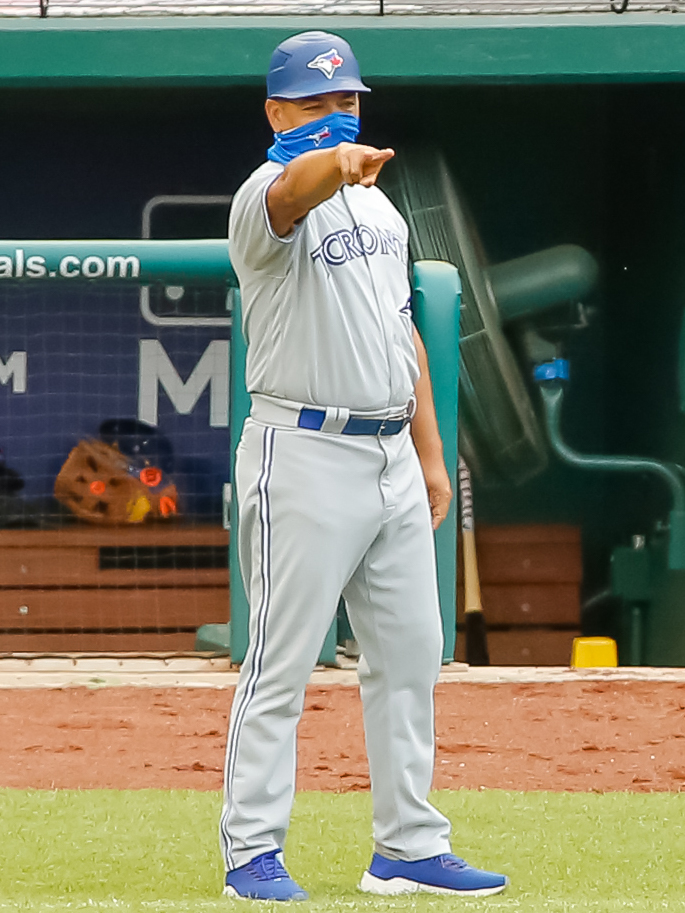
- Rivera with the Toronto Blue Jays in 2020
- Shortstop / Third base coach
- Born: January 3, 1964 (age 62); Cidra, Puerto Rico
- Batted: Right Threw: Right

MLB debut
- August 3, 1986, for the Montreal Expos

Last MLB appearance
- August 27, 1998, for the Kansas City Royals

MLB statistics
- Batting average: .233
- Home runs: 28
- Runs batted in: 209
- Stats at Baseball Reference

Teams
- As a player: Montreal Expos (1986–1989); Boston Red Sox (1989–1993); New York Mets (1994); Houston Astros (1997); Kansas City Royals (1998); As a coach: Cleveland Indians (2006–2009); Toronto Blue Jays (2011–2023)

Luis Antonio Rivera Pedraza (born January 3, 1964) is a Puerto Rican former professional baseball infielder and coach, who played for the Montreal Expos, Boston Red Sox, New York Mets, Houston Astros, and Kansas City Royals of Major League Baseball (MLB).

Rivera began coaching in the Cleveland Indians organization in 2000, and worked as their infield and first base coach from 2006 to 2009. In 2010, he joined the Toronto Blue Jays as a coaching assistant, and became the third base coach in 2012. Rivera retired at the end of the 2023 season.

== Professional career ==
Rivera signed with the Montreal Expos as an international free agent on September 22, 1981. He played four years in their minor league organization before making his MLB debut on August 3, 1986. Rivera played parts of three seasons with the Expos before he was traded to the Boston Red Sox, along with John Dopson, for Dan Gakeler and Spike Owen on December 8, 1988. Rivera had the most productive season of his career with Boston in 1991, when he hit .258 with eight home runs and 40 runs batted in (RBI) in 129 games.

After the 1993 season Rivera became a free agent. He signed with the New York Mets on January 19, 1994. He spent the 1995 and 1996 seasons entirely in the minor leagues, with the Texas Rangers and Mets respectively.

Rivera joined the Houston Astros in 1997, and finished his playing career as a member of the Kansas City Royals in 1998.

== Coaching career ==
In 2000, Rivera joined the Cleveland Indians organization, working as a coach and manager. He coached the Advanced-A Kinston Indians through the 2002 season, when he was promoted to manager of the Class-A Lake County Captains. In 2003, he was named the South Atlantic League Manager of the Year, after managing the Captains to a league-best 97–43 record. After coaching the Captains in 2004, Rivera was made the manager of the Kinston Indians prior to the 2005 season. Kinston finished the year with a 76–64 record, and went to the Carolina League Championship Series. Rivera was promoted to the Majors in 2006, working as the Indians infield coach and later first base coach until the end of the 2009 season.

In 2010, Rivera joined the Toronto Blue Jays organization, and managed the Double-A New Hampshire Fisher Cats. In 2011 and 2012, he worked as a coaching assistant for the Blue Jays. Prior to the start of the 2013 season, Rivera was named the third base coach. Rivera retired from coaching on October 5, 2023.

In 2026, Rivera was hired as manager of the St. Lucie Mets the High-A affiliate of the New York Mets for the 2026 season.

Sporting positions
Preceded by Brian Butterfield	Toronto Blue Jays third base coach 2013–2023	Succeeded by Carlos Febles
Preceded by Sal Fasano	New Hampshire Fisher Cats manager 2010	Succeeded by Gary Cathcart
