= Steve Shifflett =

American baseball player

- Pitcher
- Born: January 5, 1966 (age 60); Kansas City, Missouri, U.S.
- Batted: Right Threw: Right

MLB debut
- July 3, 1992, for the Kansas City Royals

Last MLB appearance
- October 4, 1992, for the Kansas City Royals

MLB statistics
- Win–loss record: 1–4
- Earned run average: 2.60
- Strikeouts: 25
- Stats at Baseball Reference

Teams
- Kansas City Royals (1992)

Stephen Earl Shifflett (born January 5, 1966) is a former Major League Baseball pitcher who played for one season. He pitched in 34 games for the Kansas City Royals during the 1992 season.

Shifflett attended but did not play baseball at Pleasant Hill High School in Missouri, instead playing American Legion Baseball. He began his college baseball career at Longview Community College before transferring as a third baseman to Central Missouri. He converted to pitching at Central Missouri but, after one year, could not afford to attend the school and transferred back to Longview. After attending a tryout camp, he accepted an offer to play at Emporia State. In the summer of 1989, he signed with the Kansas City Royals and began a professional baseball career.
