= Mike Gardiner =

Canadian baseball player (born 1965)

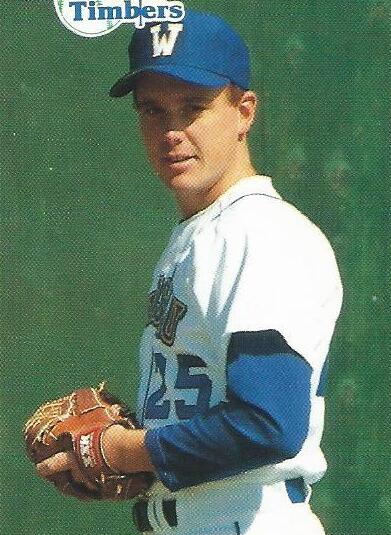
- Gardiner with the Wausau Timbers c. 1988
- Pitcher
- Born: October 19, 1965 (age 60); Sarnia, Ontario, Canada
- Batted: Switch Threw: Right

MLB debut
- September 8, 1990, for the Seattle Mariners

Last MLB appearance
- July 2, 1995, for the Detroit Tigers

MLB statistics
- Win–loss record: 17–27
- Earned run average: 5.21
- Strikeouts: 239
- Stats at Baseball Reference

Teams
- Seattle Mariners (1990); Boston Red Sox (1991–1992); Montreal Expos (1993); Detroit Tigers (1993–1995)

Michael James Gardiner (born October 19, 1965) is a Canadian former Major League Baseball pitcher who played for the Seattle Mariners, Boston Red Sox, Montreal Expos, and Detroit Tigers. He was a switch hitter and threw right-handed.

== Career ==
Gardiner was drafted by the Seattle Mariners in the 18th round (448th) of the 1987 Major League Baseball draft out of Indiana State University. He signed June 6, 1987. He reached the majors on September 8, 1990.

In his college career, Gardiner led Indiana State to the College World Series; he currently holds the career wins record (30) for the Sycamores, he's #2 in strikeouts (296) and #5 in complete games (16). He was a member of the Canadian Olympic Team for the 1984 Olympics and the 1985 Intercontinental Cup.

In a six-year major league career, Gardiner posted 17 wins, 27 losses, and a career 5.21 ERA in 136 career games. He spent a total of 12 seasons in the minors, posting a W/L record of 61–42, 3.97, 11 Saves and an ERA of 3.45. He was the Eastern League Pitcher of the Year in 1990.

== Personal life ==
Gardiner lives in Denver, North Carolina and coaches for Five Star along with coaching at North Lincoln High School.

His son, Eric, died in February 2024 at the age of 28, following a battle with cancer.
