= Peter Hoy =

Canadian baseball player (born 1966)

- Pitcher
- Born: June 29, 1966 (age 59); Brockville, Ontario, Canada
- Batted: Right Threw: Right

MLB debut
- April 11, 1992, for the Boston Red Sox

Last MLB appearance
- May 12, 1992, for the Boston Red Sox

MLB statistics
- Win–loss record: 0–0
- Earned run average: 7.36
- Strikeouts: 2
- Stats at Baseball Reference

Teams
- Boston Red Sox (1992)

Peter Alexander Hoy (born June 29, 1966) is a Canadian former relief pitcher in Major League Baseball who played briefly for the Boston Red Sox during the 1992 season. Listed at 6 feet 7 inches (2.01 m), 220 pounds (100 kg), Hoy batted and threw right-handed.

A native of Brockville, Ontario, Hoy attended Le Moyne College, and in 1987 he played collegiate summer baseball with the Chatham A's of the Cape Cod Baseball League. He was selected by Boston in the 33rd round of the 1988 MLB draft.

Hoy made Boston's roster out of spring training in 1992 largely on the strength of his sinker but, in the words of the Regina Leader-Post's John Chaput, "just when he reached The Show ... his sinker disappeared." He made five relief appearances in six weeks on the Major League roster and posted a 7.36 earned run average in 3 2/3 innings of work. He was demoted on May 16, 1992 and released following the 1993 season.

== See also ==
- List of Major League Baseball players from Canada
