= Jim Austin (baseball) =

American baseball player (born 1963)

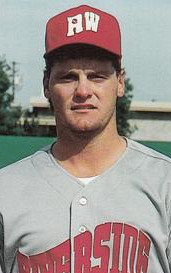
- Austin in 1988
- Pitcher
- Born: December 7, 1963 (age 61); Farmville, Virginia, U.S.
- Batted: Right Threw: Right

MLB debut
- July 4, 1991, for the Milwaukee Brewers

Last MLB appearance
- July 21, 1993, for the Milwaukee Brewers

MLB statistics
- Win–loss record: 6–4
- Earned run average: 3.06
- Strikeouts: 48
- Stats at Baseball Reference

Teams
- Milwaukee Brewers (1991–1993)

James Parker Austin (born December 7, 1963) is a former baseball pitcher who played for the Milwaukee Brewers from 1991 to 1993.

== Career ==
Austin made his major league debut for the Milwaukee Brewers on July 4, 1991, after spending 6 seasons in the minors with the San Diego Padres and Brewers organizations. Austin had an excellent 1992 season with Milwaukee, posting a record of 5–2 with a 1.85 ERA. Shortly afterwards an arm injury derailed his major league career. After his injury, Austin played for the Triple-A Buffalo Bisons in the Cleveland Indians organization in 1995, the Triple-A Pawtucket Red Sox of the Boston Red Sox organization in 1996, and in the Chinese Professional Baseball League for the Wei Chuan Dragons in 1997 before his career ended.
