= Scott Taylor (left-handed pitcher) =

American baseball player (born 1967)

- Pitcher
- Born: August 2, 1967 (age 57); Defiance, Ohio, U.S.
- Batted: Left Threw: Left

MLB debut
- September 17, 1992, for the Boston Red Sox

Last MLB appearance
- October 3, 1993, for the Boston Red Sox

MLB statistics
- Win–loss record: 1–2
- Earned run average: 6.31
- Strikeouts: 15
- Stats at Baseball Reference

Teams
- Boston Red Sox (1992–1993)

Rodney Scott Taylor (born August 2, 1967) is an American former professional baseball pitcher. He played in Major League Baseball (MLB) for the Boston Red Sox.

== Biography ==
Taylor played high school baseball in his hometown of Defiance, Ohio. His senior year, he threw a no-hitter (Note: Taylor's no-hitter is absent from the detailed baseball records kept by Defiance High School, but was reported locally in The Lima News.) and posted a 5–2 win–loss record with a 0.52 earned run average (ERA). In June 1985, he committed to attend Bowling Green State University.

Taylor played college baseball for three seasons with the Bowling Green Falcons, receiving all-Mid-American Conference (MAC) honorable mention in 1986 and 1987, and second-team honors in 1988. Taylor noted that he was hampered by a sore lower back during the 1987 season, and during that summer had issues with a torn muscle in his arm. He was named the team's outstanding pitcher for 1988, having recorded 87 strikeouts in 83 1/3 innings pitched (9.4 strikeouts per nine innings pitched) while posting a 4–5 record with a 3.24 ERA. Taylor was selected by the Boston Red Sox in the 28th round of the 1988 MLB draft; he signed with the team the following week.

Taylor made his professional debut in 1988 with the Elmira Pioneers, a Class A Short Season affiliate of the Red Sox. He was limited to just 3 2/3 innings due to a tender left bicep muscle. In 1989, he played for the Class A Lynchburg Red Sox in the Carolina League, making 19 appearances (nine starts) while pitching to a 5–3 record with a 2.89 ERA and 99 strikeouts in 81 innings pitched.

Taylor first reached the Double-A level in 1990, and the Triple-A level in 1991. Taylor was a September call-up for Boston in both 1992 and 1993, appearing in four games (one start) from mid-September through the end of the season in 1992, and in 16 games (all in relief) during the final month of the 1993 season. In 20 total major-league appearances (one start), Taylor pitched to a 1–2 record with an ERA of 6.31; he struck out 15 batters in 25 2/3 innings pitched.

Taylor was released by the Red Sox at the end of spring training in 1994, then underwent arthroscopic surgery on his left rotator cuff, causing him to miss the 1994 season. He played a final professional season in 1995, at the Triple-A level in the Pacific Coast League with the Calgary Cannons, a farm team of the Pittsburgh Pirates.

In 1999, Taylor was inducted to the athletic hall of fame of his high school in Ohio.
