= Eric Bell (baseball) =

American baseball player (born 1963)

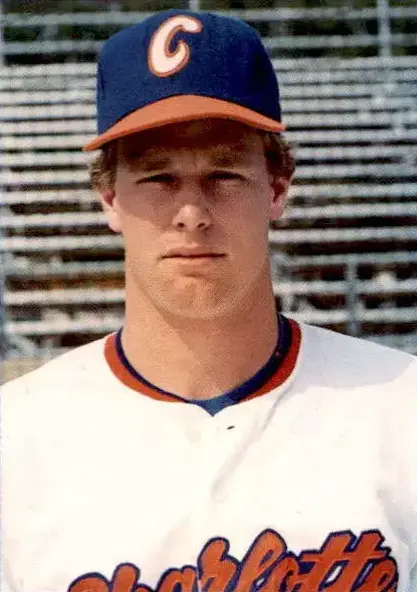
- Bell with the Charlotte O's c. 1986
- Pitcher
- Born: October 27, 1963 (age 62); Modesto, California, U.S.
- Batted: Left Threw: Left

MLB debut
- September 24, 1985, for the Baltimore Orioles

Last MLB appearance
- May 8, 1993, for the Houston Astros

MLB statistics
- Win–loss record: 15–18
- Earned run average: 5.18
- Strikeouts: 152
- Stats at Baseball Reference

Teams
- Baltimore Orioles (1985–1987); Cleveland Indians (1991–1992); Houston Astros (1993)

Eric Alvin Bell (born October 27, 1963) is an American former professional baseball pitcher in Major League Baseball from 1985 to 1993.

He is a 1982 graduate of Beyer High School in Modesto, California.

He played with the Cleveland Indians, Baltimore Orioles, and Houston Astros.
