= 1989 New York Yankees season =

Season for the Major League Baseball team the New York Yankees

1989 New York Yankees
- League: American League
- Division: East
- Ballpark: Yankee Stadium
- City: New York City
- Record: 74-87 (.460)
- Owners: George Steinbrenner
- General managers: Bob Quinn
- Managers: Dallas Green, Bucky Dent
- Television: WPIX (Phil Rizzuto, George Grande, Tom Seaver); MSG (Bobby Murcer, Tommy Hutton, Lou Piniella, Greg Gumbel)
- Radio: WABC (AM) (John Sterling, Jay Johnstone)

The 1989 New York Yankees season was the 87th season for the Yankees. The team finished with a record of 74–87, finishing in fifth place, 14.5 games behind the Toronto Blue Jays. New York was managed by Dallas Green and Bucky Dent. The Yankees played at Yankee Stadium.

== Offseason ==
- October 24, 1988: Jack Clark and Pat Clements were traded by the Yankees to the San Diego Padres for Stan Jefferson, Jimmy Jones and Lance McCullers.
- November 17, 1988: Don Schulze was signed as a free agent by the Yankees.
- November 23, 1988: Steve Sax was signed as a free agent by the Yankees.
- November 26, 1988: Steve Kiefer was signed as a free agent by the Yankees.
- December 5, 1988: Bobby Meacham was traded by the New York Yankees to the Texas Rangers for Bob Brower.
- December 8, 1988: Andy Hawkins was signed as a free agent by the Yankees.
- December 18, 1988: Wayne Tolleson was signed as a free agent by the Yankees.
- December 20, 1988: Jamie Quirk was signed as a free agent by the Yankees.
- December 22, 1988: Dickie Noles was signed as a free agent by the Yankees.
- January 10, 1989: Rick Rhoden was traded by the Yankees to the Houston Astros for John Fishel, Mike Hook (minors), and Pedro DeLeon (minors).
- February 13, 1989: Tommy John was signed as a free agent by the Yankees.
- March 19, 1989: Joel Skinner was traded by the Yankees to the Cleveland Indians for Mel Hall.
- March 23, 1989: Charles Hudson was traded by the Yankees to the Detroit Tigers for Tom Brookens.
- March 29, 1989: Dana Ridenour (minors) was traded by the Yankees to the Seattle Mariners for Steve Balboni.

== Regular season ==
- Alvaro Espinoza was second in the majors with 23 sacrifices.
- In 1989, Yankees pitcher Tommy John matched Deacon McGuire's record (since broken) for most seasons played in a Major League Baseball career with 26 seasons played.
- Sammy Sosa made his major league debut on June 16, 1989, in a game against the New York Yankees. Sosa appeared in 4 at-bats and had 2 hits.

=== Season standings ===
AL East
Team	W	L	Pct.	GB	Home	Road
Toronto Blue Jays	89	73	.549	—	46‍–‍35	43‍–‍38
Baltimore Orioles	87	75	.537	2	47‍–‍34	40‍–‍41
Boston Red Sox	83	79	.512	6	46‍–‍35	37‍–‍44
Milwaukee Brewers	81	81	.500	8	45‍–‍36	36‍–‍45
New York Yankees	74	87	.460	14½	41‍–‍40	33‍–‍47
Cleveland Indians	73	89	.451	16	41‍–‍40	32‍–‍49
Detroit Tigers	59	103	.364	30	38‍–‍43	21‍–‍60

=== Record vs. opponents ===
1989 American League record Sources:
Team	BAL	BOS	CAL	CWS	CLE	DET	KC	MIL	MIN	NYY	OAK	SEA	TEX	TOR
Baltimore	—	6–7	6–6	6–6	7–6	10–3	6–6	7–6	4–8	8–5	5–7	6–6	9–3	7–6
Boston	7–6	—	4–8	7–5	8–5	11–2	4–8	6–7	6–6	7–6	7–5	5–7	6–6	5–8
California	6–6	8–4	—	8–5	5–7	11–1	4–9	7–5	11–2	6–6	5–8	7–6	6–7	7–5
Chicago	6–6	5–7	5–8	—	7–5	4–8	6–7	10–2	5–8	5–6	5–8	7–6	3–10	1–11
Cleveland	6–7	5–8	7–5	5–7	—	5–8	8–4	3–10	5–7	9–4	2–10	6–6	7–5	5–8
Detroit	3–10	2–11	1–11	8–4	8–5	—	6–6	6–7	5–7	6–7	4–8	4–8	4–8	2–11
Kansas City	6–6	8–4	9–4	7–6	4–8	6–6	—	8–4	7–6	6–6	7–6	9–4	8–5	7–5
Milwaukee	6–7	7–6	5–7	2–10	10–3	7–6	4–8	—	9–3	8–5	5–7	7–5	5–7	6–7
Minnesota	8–4	6–6	2–11	8–5	7–5	7–5	6–7	3–9	—	6–6	6–7	7–6	5–8	9–3
New York	5–8	6–7	6–6	6–5	4–9	7–6	6–6	5–8	6–6	—	3–9	8–4	5–7	7–6
Oakland	7–5	5–7	8–5	8–5	10–2	8–4	6–7	7–5	7–6	9–3	—	9–4	8–5	7–5
Seattle	6–6	7–5	6–7	6–7	6–6	8–4	4–9	5–7	6–7	4–8	4–9	—	6–7	5–7
Texas	3–9	6–6	7–6	10–3	5–7	8–4	5–8	7–5	8–5	7–5	5–8	7–6	—	5–7
Toronto	6–7	8–5	5–7	11–1	8–5	11–2	5–7	7–6	3–9	6–7	5–7	7–5	7–5	—

=== Notable transactions ===
- April, 30 1989 Al Leiter was traded by the Yankees to the Toronto Blue Jays for Jesse Barfield.
- May 16, 1989: Jamie Quirk was released by the Yankees.
- May 30, 1989: Tommy John was released by the Yankees.
- June 5, 1989: J. T. Snow was drafted by the Yankees in the 5th round of the 1989 Major League Baseball draft. Player signed June 11, 1989.
- June 21, 1989: Rickey Henderson was traded by the Yankees to the Oakland Athletics for Greg Cadaret, Eric Plunk, and Luis Polonia.
- June 22, 1989: Richard Dotson was released by the Yankees.
- July 20, 1989: Stan Jefferson was traded by the Yankees to the Baltimore Orioles for John Habyan.
- July 22, 1989: Mike Pagliarulo and Don Schulze were traded by the Yankees to the San Diego Padres for Walt Terrell and a player to be named later. The Padres completed the deal by sending Freddie Toliver to the Yankees on September 27.
- August 10, 1989: Rich Gossage was selected off waivers by the Yankees from the San Francisco Giants.
- August 29, 1989: John Candelaria was traded by the Yankees to the Montreal Expos for Mike Blowers.
- August 30, 1989: Ken Phelps was traded by the Yankees to the Oakland Athletics for Scott Holcomb (minors).

=== Roster ===
1989 New York Yankees
Roster
Pitchers: 25 Greg Cadaret; 45 John Candelaria; 51 Chuck Cary; 34 Bob Davidson; 34,36 Richard Dotson; 28 Dave Eiland; 54 Goose Gossage; 35 Lee Guetterman; 40 Andy Hawkins; 25 Tommy John; 26 Jimmy Jones; 29,42 Dave LaPoint; 28 Al Leiter; 41 Lance McCullers; 45 Kevin Mmahat; 28,54 Dale Mohorcic; 33,55 Scott Nielsen; 38 Clay Parker; 33 Eric Plunk; 19 Dave Righetti; 34,51,54 Don Schulze; 34 Walt Terrell	Catchers: 56 Brian Dorsett; 53 Bob Geren; 18 Jamie Quirk; 11 Don Slaught; Infielders: 50 Steve Balboni; 13 Mike Blowers; 12 Tom Brookens; 20 Álvaro Espinoza; 26,64 Steve Kiefer; 23 Don Mattingly; 28,57,58 Hensley Meulens; 13 Mike Pagliarulo; 21 Ken Phelps; 6 Steve Sax; 2 Wayne Tolleson; 18 Randy Velarde	Outfielders: 28,29 Jesse Barfield; 33 Bob Brower; 27 Mel Hall; 24 Rickey Henderson; 26 Stan Jefferson; 39 Roberto Kelly; 24,28 Marcus Lawton; 21,22,28 Hal Morris; 22 Luis Polonia; 18,24 Deion Sanders; 22 Gary Ward	Manager: 17,30 Bucky Dent; 46 Dallas Green; Coaches: 36,42 Billy Connors (Pitching); 47 Pat Corrales (First Base); 43 Lee Elia (Third Base); 52 Mike Ferraro (First Base); 52 Charlie Fox (Bench); 48 Frank Howard (Hitting); 43 Gene Michael (Third Base); 44 John Stearns (Bullpen); 47 Champ Summers (Hitting)

== Player stats ==
= Indicates team leader

=== Batting ===
==== Starters by position ====
Note: Pos = Position; G = Games played; AB = At bats; H = Hits; Avg. = Batting average; HR = Home runs; RBI = Runs batted in

Pos	Player	G	AB	H	Avg.	HR	RBI
C	Don Slaught	117	350	88	.251	5	38
1B	Don Mattingly	158	631	191	.303	23	113
2B	Steve Sax	158	651	205	.310	5	63
3B	Mike Pagliarulo	74	223	44	.197	4	16
SS	Álvaro Espinoza	146	503	142	.282	0	41
LF	Rickey Henderson	65	235	58	.247	3	22
CF	Roberto Kelly	137	441	133	.302	9	48
RF	Jesse Barfield	129	441	106	.240	18	56
DH	Steve Balboni	110	300	71	.237	17	59

==== Other batters ====
Note: G = Games played; AB = At bats; H = Hits; Avg. = Batting average; HR = Home runs; RBI = Runs batted in

Player	G	AB	H	Avg.	HR	RBI
Mel Hall	113	361	94	.260	17	58
Luis Polonia	66	227	71	.313	2	29
Bob Geren	65	205	59	.288	9	27
Ken Phelps	86	185	46	.249	7	29
Tom Brookens	66	168	38	.226	4	14
Wayne Tolleson	80	140	23	.164	1	9
Randy Velarde	33	100	34	.340	2	11
Bob Brower	26	69	16	.232	2	3
Deion Sanders	14	47	11	.234	2	7
Mike Blowers	13	38	10	.263	0	3
Hensley Meulens	8	28	5	.179	0	1
Jamie Quirk	13	24	2	.083	0	0
Brian Dorsett	8	22	8	.364	0	4
Hal Morris	15	18	5	.278	0	4
Gary Ward	8	17	5	.294	0	1
Marcus Lawton	10	14	3	.214	0	0
Stan Jefferson	10	12	1	.083	0	1
Steve Kiefer	5	8	1	.125	0	0

=== Pitching ===
==== Starting pitchers ====
Note: G = Games pitched; IP = Innings pitched; W = Wins; L = Losses; ERA = Earned run average; SO = Strikeouts

Player	G	IP	W	L	ERA	SO
Andy Hawkins	34	208.1	15	15	4.80	98
Clay Parker	22	120.0	4	5	3.68	53
Dave LaPoint	20	113.2	6	9	5.62	51
Walt Terrell	13	83.0	6	5	5.20	30
Tommy John	10	63.2	2	7	5.80	18
Richard Dotson	11	51.2	2	5	5.57	14
Dave Eiland	6	34.1	1	3	5.77	11
Al Leiter	4	26.2	1	2	6.08	22
Don Schulze	2	11.0	1	1	4.09	5

==== Other pitchers ====
Note: G = Games pitched; IP = Innings pitched; W = Wins; L = Losses; ERA = Earned run average; SO = Strikeouts

Player	G	IP	W	L	ERA	SO
Chuck Cary	22	99.1	4	4	3.26	79
Greg Cadaret	20	92.1	5	5	4.58	66
Eric Plunk	27	75.2	7	5	3.69	61
John Candelaria	10	49.0	3	3	5.14	37
Jimmy Jones	11	48.0	2	1	5.25	25
Kevin Mmahat	4	7.2	0	2	12.91	3

==== Relief pitchers ====
Note: G = Games pitched; W = Wins; L = Losses; SV = Saves; ERA = Earned run average; SO = Strikeouts

Player	G	W	L	SV	ERA	SO
Dave Righetti	55	2	6	25	3.00	51
Lee Guetterman	70	5	5	13	2.45	51
Lance McCullers	52	4	3	3	4.57	82
Dale Mohorcic	32	2	1	2	4.99	24
Rich Gossage	11	1	0	1	3.77	6
Scott Nielsen	2	1	0	0	13.50	0
Bob Davidson	1	0	0	0	18.00	0

== Farm system ==
Level	Team	League	Manager
AAA	Columbus Clippers	International League	Bucky Dent and Rick Down
AA	Albany-Colonie Yankees	Eastern League	Buck Showalter
A	Prince William Cannons	Carolina League	Mark Weidemaier and Stump Merrill
A	Fort Lauderdale Yankees	Florida State League	Clete Boyer
A-Short Season	Oneonta Yankees	New York–Penn League	Brian Butterfield
Rookie	GCL Yankees	Gulf Coast League	Jack Gillis

LEAGUE CHAMPIONS: Albany-Colonie, Prince William, GCL Yankees
