= 1990 New York Yankees season =

Season for the Major League Baseball team the New York Yankees

1990 New York Yankees
- League: American League
- Division: East
- Ballpark: Yankee Stadium
- City: New York City
- Record: 67-95 (.414)
- Owners: George Steinbrenner
- General managers: Harding "Pete" Peterson, Gene Michael
- Managers: Bucky Dent, Stump Merrill
- Television: WPIX (Phil Rizzuto, George Grande, Tom Seaver); MSG (Tony Kubek, Dewayne Staats, Al Trautwig)
- Radio: WABC (AM) (John Sterling, Jay Johnstone)

The 1990 New York Yankees season was the 88th season for the Yankees. The team finished in seventh place in the American League East with a record of 67–95, finishing 21 games behind the Boston Red Sox. It was the Yankees' first last-place finish since 1966 (and their first last-place in the division era), their most losses in a season since 1912 (a record which still stands), and their most recent last-place finish to date. New York was managed by Stump Merrill and Bucky Dent. The Yankees played at Yankee Stadium.

The Yankees left SportsChannel NY at the end of the 1988 season, and were beginning their 2nd season of their cable and satellite broadcasts to the cable-only MSG Network.

The team was profiled in depth in a docuseries on Peacock called the 'Bronx Zoo ‘90: Crime, Chaos and Baseball', which was released in May 2024.

== Offseason ==
=== Notable transactions ===
- October 1989: Dickie Noles was released by the Yankees.
- October 4, 1989: Steve Kiefer was released by the Yankees.
- November 20, 1989: Rafael Santana was released by the Yankees.
- November 21, 1989: Pascual Pérez was signed as a free agent by the Yankees.
- December 12, 1989: Hal Morris and Rodney Imes (minors) were traded by the Yankees to the Cincinnati Reds for Tim Leary and Van Snider.
- December 20, 1989: Rick Cerone was signed as a free agent by the Yankees.
- February 17, 1990: Mariano Rivera was signed as an amateur free agent by the Yankees.
- March 13, 1990: Orlando Miller was traded by the Yankees to the Houston Astros for Dave Silvestri and a player to be named later. The Astros completed the deal by sending Daven Bond (minors) to the Yankees on June 11.

=== Death of Billy Martin ===
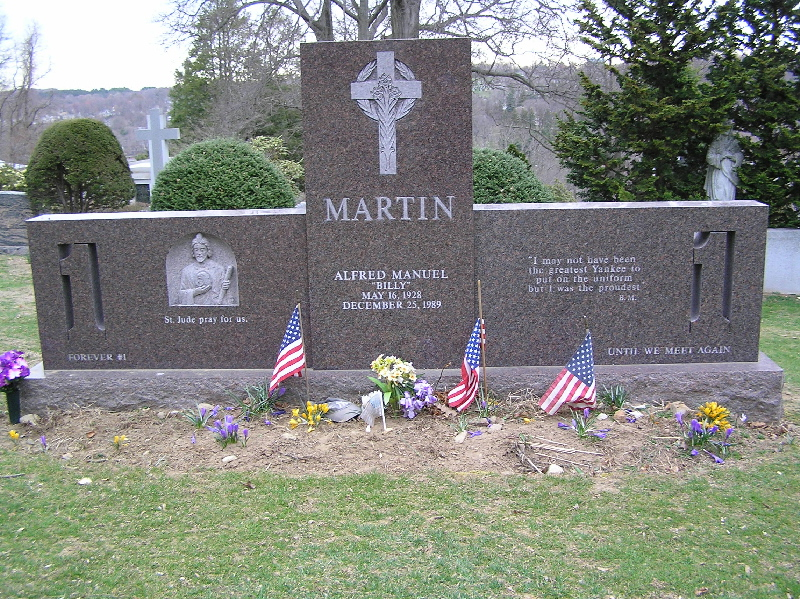
Billy Martin's grave in Cemetery of the Gate of Heaven.

Multi-time former Yankees manager Billy Martin was working as a special consultant to Yankees owner George Steinbrenner when he was killed in a one-car crash in Binghamton, New York, on Christmas Day (December 25) in 1989. Martin had been drinking heavily with his friend, William Reedy, who was driving a pickup truck at the time of the accident. When Martin was killed, the media reported that he was a passenger in Reedy's pickup. However, Peter Golenbock, in his book Wild, High, and Tight: The Life and Death of Billy Martin, makes the case that Martin was the driver and that his wife and Reedy covered up the truth. According to the HBO TV series Autopsy, forensic pathologist Dr. Michael Baden performed the autopsy on Martin and investigated the accident scene, including the pick-up truck in which Martin died. The autopsy revealed that Martin's impact injuries were all on the right side, and that hair and other DNA found on the right side of the shattered windshield belonged to Martin, who was not wearing a seatbelt at the time of the accident. The conclusion of the autopsy study was that Reedy drove the pick-up.

Billy Martin was eulogized by Cardinal John Joseph O'Connor at St. Patrick's Cathedral, New York, before his funeral at Gate of Heaven Cemetery in Hawthorne, New York. His grave is located about 150 feet from the grave of Babe Ruth. The following epitaph by Billy Martin himself appears on the headstone: I may not have been the greatest Yankee to put on the uniform but I was the proudest. Former President of the United States Richard Nixon attended Martin's funeral. The Yankees started the season with a small number 1 on their left sleeves.

== Regular season ==
- June 6, 1990: Yankees manager Bucky Dent was fired before a game against the Red Sox at Fenway Park. George Steinbrenner was severely criticized for firing Dent, his 18th managerial change in 18 years, because he did it in Boston, where Dent had his greatest moment as a player. However, Bill Pennington called the firing of Dent "merciless." But Yankees television analyst Tony Kubek blasted at Steinbrenner for the firing in a harsh, angry way. At the beginning of the broadcast of the game on MSG Network, he said to Yankees television play-by-play announcer Dewayne Staats, "George Steinbrenner...mishandled this. You don't take a Bucky Dent (at) the site of one of the greatest home runs in Yankee history and fire him and make it a media circus for the Boston Red Sox." He then stared defiantly on camera and said to Steinbrenner, "You don't do it by telephone, either, George. You do it face to face, eyeball to eyeball...If you really are a winner, you should not have handled this like a loser." He then said, angrily, "George, you're a bully and a coward." He then said that "What all this does, it just wrecks George Steinbrenner's credibility with his players, with the front office and in baseball more than it already is–if that's possible. It was just mishandled." The firing of Dent shook New York to its core and the Yankees flagship radio station then, WABC, which also criticized the firing, ran editorials demanding that Steinbrenner sell the team.
- On July 30, 1990, Commissioner Fay Vincent banned Steinbrenner from baseball for life after he paid Howard Spira, a small-time gambler, $40,000 for "dirt" after Dave Winfield sued him for failing to pay his foundation the $300,000 guaranteed in his contract.
- October 3, 1990: Cecil Fielder hit two home runs at Yankee Stadium to finish with 51 for the season. The 50th home run was hit off of Steve Adkins. Fielder would be the first Major Leaguer since George Foster in 1977 to hit 50 home runs in a season. It was the 18th time that a major leaguer (and the 11th time that an American League player) hit for 50 home runs in a season.

=== Season standings ===
AL East
Team	W	L	Pct.	GB	Home	Road
Boston Red Sox	88	74	.543	—	51‍–‍30	37‍–‍44
Toronto Blue Jays	86	76	.531	2	44‍–‍37	42‍–‍39
Detroit Tigers	79	83	.488	9	39‍–‍42	40‍–‍41
Cleveland Indians	77	85	.475	11	41‍–‍40	36‍–‍45
Baltimore Orioles	76	85	.472	11½	40‍–‍40	36‍–‍45
Milwaukee Brewers	74	88	.457	14	39‍–‍42	35‍–‍46
New York Yankees	67	95	.414	21	37‍–‍44	30‍–‍51

=== Record vs. opponents ===
1990 American League record Sources:
Team	BAL	BOS	CAL	CWS	CLE	DET	KC	MIL	MIN	NYY	OAK	SEA	TEX	TOR
Baltimore	—	4–9	7–5	6–6	6–7	6–7	8–3	7–6	6–6	6–7	4–8	3–9	8–4	5–8
Boston	9–4	—	7–5	6–6	9–4	8–5	4–8	5–8	4–8	9–4	4–8	8–4	5–7	10–3
California	5–7	5–7	—	5–8	7–5	5–7	7–6	7–5	9–4	6–6	4–9	5–8	8–5	7–5
Chicago	6–6	6–6	8–5	—	5–7	5–7	9–4	10–2	7–6	10–2	8–5	8–5	7–6	5–7
Cleveland	7–6	4–9	5–7	7–5	—	5–8	6–6	9–4	7–5	5–8	4–8	7–5	7–5	4–9
Detroit	7–6	5–8	7–5	7–5	8–5	—	5–7	3–10	6–6	7–6	6–6	7–5	6–6	5–8
Kansas City	3–8	8–4	6–7	4–9	6–6	7–5	—	4–8	8–5	8–4	4–9	7–6	5–8	5–7
Milwaukee	6–7	8–5	5–7	2–10	4–9	10–3	8–4	—	4–8	6–7	5–7	4–8	5–7	7–6
Minnesota	6–6	8–4	4–9	6–7	5–7	6–6	5–8	8–4	—	6–6	6–7	6–7	5–8	3–9
New York	7–6	4–9	6–6	2–10	8–5	6–7	4–8	7–6	6–6	—	0–12	9–3	3–9	5–8
Oakland	8–4	8–4	9–4	5–8	8–4	6–6	9–4	7–5	7–6	12–0	—	9–4	8–5	7–5
Seattle	9–3	4–8	8–5	5–8	5–7	5–7	6–7	8–4	7–6	3–9	4–9	—	7–6	6–6
Texas	4–8	7–5	5–8	6–7	5–7	6–6	8–5	7–5	8–5	9–3	5–8	6–7	—	7–5
Toronto	8–5	3–10	5–7	7–5	9–4	8–5	7–5	6–7	9–3	8–5	5–7	6–6	5–7	—

=== Notable transactions ===
- April 29, 1990: Luis Polonia was traded by the Yankees to the California Angels for Claudell Washington and Rich Monteleone.
- May 11, 1990: Dave Winfield was traded by the Yankees to the California Angels in exchange for Mike Witt.
- June 4, 1990: Clay Parker and Lance McCullers were traded by the Yankees to the Detroit Tigers for Matt Nokes.
- September 24, 1990: Deion Sanders was released by the Yankees.

==== Draft picks ====
- June 4, 1990: 1990 Major League Baseball draft
  - Carl Everett was drafted by the Yankees in the 1st round.
  - Robert Eenhoorn was drafted by the Yankees in the 2nd round of the 1990 June Draft. Player signed June 10, 1990.
  - Sam Militello was drafted by the Yankees in the 6th round.
  - Jalal Leach was drafted by the Yankees in the 7th round. Player signed June 8, 1990.
  - Ricky Ledée was drafted by the Yankees in the 16th round. Player signed June 5, 1990.
  - Andy Pettitte was drafted by the Yankees in the 22nd round, but did not sign.
  - Jorge Posada was drafted by the Yankees in the 24th round. Player signed May 24, 1991.
  - Shane Spencer was drafted by the Yankees in the 28th round. Player signed June 7, 1990.

=== Roster ===
1990 New York Yankees
Roster
Pitchers: 59 Steve Adkins; 25 Greg Cadaret; 51 Chuck Cary; 58 Dave Eiland; 35 Lee Guetterman; 61 John Habyan; 40 Andy Hawkins; 26 Jimmy Jones; 42 Dave LaPoint; 54 Tim Leary; 56 Mark Leiter; 41 Lance McCullers; 28,69 Alan Mills; 55 Rich Monteleone; 38 Clay Parker; 34 Pascual Pérez; 33 Eric Plunk; 19 Dave Righetti; 43 Jeff Robinson; 22 Mike Witt	Catchers: 11 Rick Cerone; 28 Brian Dorsett; 53 Bob Geren; 38 Matt Nokes; Infielders: 45 Steve Balboni; 24,21 Mike Blowers; 20 Álvaro Espinoza; 12 Jim Leyritz; 24 Kevin Maas; 23 Don Mattingly; 6 Steve Sax; 2 Wayne Tolleson; 18 Randy Velarde; 63 Jim Walewander	Outfielders: 50 Oscar Azócar; 29 Jesse Barfield; 27 Mel Hall; 39 Roberto Kelly; 31 Hensley Meulens; 21 Deion Sanders; 17 Claudell Washington; 31 Dave Winfield; Other batters: 22 Luis Polonia	Manager: 20 Bucky Dent; 46 Stump Merrill; Coaches: 52 Mark Connor; 36 Billy Connors; 44 Mike Ferraro; 48 Buck Showalter; 46 Joe Sparks; 47 Champ Summers

=== Kevin Maas ===
- Kevin Maas set a major league record for the fewest at bats (72) to hit 10 home runs. He also set a record by hitting his first 15 home runs in the fewest at-bats. About halfway through the season a group of a dozen or so young ladies began wearing "Maas-tops" to Yankees home games and sitting in the right field stands. Whenever Maas hit a home run to right, the girls would get up, remove their tops and jump up and down until Maas finished circling the bases. However, after a few home runs the women were banned from entering Yankee Stadium.

=== Andy Hawkins no-hitter ===
- July 1, 1990: Yankees pitcher Andy Hawkins threw a no-hitter against the Chicago White Sox but lost the game 4–0. The following year, Major League Baseball changed the rule to require a minimum nine complete innings pitched to count as a no-hitter, and as Hawkins pitched only eight innings, as Chicago hosted and did not bat in the ninth, his no-hitter is no longer official.

==== Line score ====
July 1, Comiskey Park, Chicago, Illinois

Team	1	2	3	4	5	6	7	8	9	R	H	E
New York	0	0	0	0	0	0	0	0	0	0	4	3
Chicago	0	0	0	0	0	0	0	4	x	4	0	2
W: Barry Jones (10–1) L: Andy Hawkins (1–5)
Attendance: 30,642 Time: 2:34

==== Batting ====
New York Yankees	AB	R	H	RBI	Chicago White Sox	AB	R	H	RBI
Kelly, cf	4	0	0	0	Johnson, cf	3	1	0	0
Sax, 2b	4	0	0	0	Ventura, 3b	4	1	0	0
Mattingly, 1b	4	0	0	0	Calderon, dh	3	0	0	0
Balboni, dh	4	0	0	0	Pasqua, lf	4	0	0	0
Tolleson, pr, dh	0	0	0	0	Gallagher, lf	0	0	0	0
Barfield, rf	4	0	1	0	Kittle, 1b	3	0	0	0
Leyritz, lf	3	0	1	0	Lyons, 1b	0	0	0	0
Blowers, 3b	3	0	0	0	Karkovice, c	2	0	0	0
Geren, c	3	0	1	0	Fletcher, 2b	2	0	0	0
Espinoza, ss	2	0	1	0	Sosa, rf	3	1	0	0
NONE	0	0	0	0	Guillen, ss	2	1	0	0
Totals	31	0	4	0	Totals	26	4	0	0

==== Pitching ====
New York Yankees	IP	H	R	ER	BB	SO
Hawkins, L (1–5)	8.0	0	4	0	5	3

Chicago White Sox	IP	H	R	ER	BB	SO
Hibbard	7.0	4	0	0	0	4
Jones W (10–1)	1.0	0	0	0	0	1
Radinsky	1.0	0	0	0	0	0

== Player stats ==
= Indicates team leader

=== Batting ===
==== Starters by position ====
Note: Pos = Position; G = Games played; AB = At bats; H = Hits; Avg. = Batting average; HR = Home runs; RBI = Runs batted in

Pos	Player	G	AB	H	Avg.	HR	RBI
C	Bob Geren	110	277	59	.213	8	31
1B	Don Mattingly	102	394	101	.256	5	42
2B	Steve Sax	155	615	160	.260	4	42
3B	Jim Leyritz	92	303	78	.257	5	25
SS	Álvaro Espinoza	150	438	98	.224	2	20
LF	Oscar Azócar	65	214	53	.248	5	19
CF	Roberto Kelly	162	641	183	.285	15	61
RF	Jesse Barfield	153	476	117	.246	25	78
DH	Steve Balboni	116	266	51	.192	17	34

==== Other batters ====
Note: G = Games played; AB = At bats; H = Hits; Avg. = Batting average; HR = Home runs; RBI = Runs batted in

Player	G	AB	H	Avg.	HR	RBI
Mel Hall	113	360	93	.258	12	46
Kevin Maas	79	254	64	.252	21	41
Matt Nokes	92	240	57	.238	8	32
Randy Velarde	95	229	48	.210	5	19
Mike Blowers	48	144	27	.188	5	21
Rick Cerone	49	139	42	.302	2	11
Deion Sanders	57	133	21	.158	3	9
Hensley Meulens	23	83	20	.241	3	10
Claudell Washington	33	80	13	.163	0	6
Wayne Tolleson	73	74	11	.149	0	4
Dave Winfield	20	61	13	.213	2	6
Brian Dorsett	14	35	5	.143	0	0
Luis Polonia	11	22	7	.318	0	3
Jim Walewander	9	5	1	.200	0	1

=== Pitching ===
==== Starting pitchers ====
Note: G = Games pitched; IP = Innings pitched; W = Wins; L = Losses; ERA = Earned run average; SO = Strikeouts

Player	G	IP	W	L	ERA	SO
Tim Leary	31	208.0	9	19	4.11	138
Dave LaPoint	28	157.2	7	10	4.11	67
Andy Hawkins	28	157.2	5	12	5.37	74
Chuck Cary	27	156.2	6	12	4.19	134
Mike Witt	16	96.2	5	6	4.47	60
Dave Eiland	5	30.1	2	1	3.56	16
Steve Adkins	5	24.0	1	2	6.38	14
Pascual Pérez	3	14.0	1	2	1.29	12

==== Other pitchers ====
Note: G = Games pitched; IP = Innings pitched; W = Wins; L = Losses; ERA = Earned run average; SO = Strikeouts

Player	G	IP	W	L	ERA	SO
Jimmy Jones	17	50.0	1	2	6.30	25
Mark Leiter	8	26.1	1	1	6.84	21
Clay Parker	5	22.0	1	1	4.50	20

==== Relief pitchers ====
Note: G = Games pitched; W = Wins; L = Losses; SV = Saves; ERA = Earned run average; SO = Strikeouts

Player	G	W	L	SV	ERA	SO
Dave Righetti	53	1	1	36	3.57	43
Lee Guetterman	64	11	7	2	3.19	48
Jeff Robinson	54	3	6	0	3.45	43
Greg Cadaret	54	5	4	3	4.15	80
Eric Plunk	47	6	3	0	2.72	67
Alan Mills	36	1	5	0	4.10	24
Lance McCullers	11	1	0	0	3.60	11
John Habyan	6	0	0	0	2.08	4
Rich Monteleone	5	0	1	0	6.14	8

== Farm system ==
Level	Team	League	Manager
AAA	Columbus Clippers	International League	Stump Merrill and Rick Down
AA	Albany-Colonie Yankees	Eastern League	Rick Down and Dan Radison
A	Prince William Cannons	Carolina League	Gary Denbo
A	Fort Lauderdale Yankees	Florida State League	Mike Hart
A	Greensboro Hornets	South Atlantic League	Brian Butterfield
A-Short Season	Oneonta Yankees	New York–Penn League	Trey Hillman
Rookie	GCL Yankees	Gulf Coast League	Glenn Sherlock

LEAGUE CHAMPIONS: Oneonta
