= Steve Adkins =

American baseball player

- Pitcher
- Born: October 26, 1964 (age 62); Chicago, Illinois, U.S.
- Batted: Right Threw: Left

MLB debut
- September 12, 1990, for the New York Yankees

Last MLB appearance
- October 3, 1990, for the New York Yankees

MLB statistics
- Win–loss record: 1–2
- Earned run average: 6.38
- Strikeouts: 14
- Stats at Baseball Reference

Teams
- New York Yankees (1990)

Steven Thomas "Steve" Adkins (born October 26, 1964) is an American former left-handed starting pitcher in Major League Baseball who played for the New York Yankees in 1990. He attended University of Pennsylvania, where he participated in college baseball.

== Career ==
On June 2, 1986, Adkins was drafted by the New York Yankees in the 15th round of the amateur draft. Adkins signed to play in the minors in the Yankees organization.

Adkins made his major league debut on September 12, 1990, with the Yankees at age 25. Adkins did not allow a hit in his debut. However, he walked eight batters in only 1 1/3 innings. In the first inning, Adkins walked the first three hitters he faced, then retired the side. After the first hitter in the second inning flied out, Adkins walked the next five hitters before being removed from the game, only two short of tying the record. The Yankees lost the game 5–4. Adkins played his final major league game for the Yankees on October 3, 1990, where he gave up Cecil Fielder's 50th home run of the season. On June 26, 1991, he was traded to the Chicago Cubs in exchange for minor leaguer David Rosario.

At the time of his retirement, Adkins had a career earned run average of 6.38. He finished with 24 innings pitched and 14 strikeouts in a total of five games. He allowed 19 hits, four home runs, and 29 walks. He had one win in his career, on September 28, 1990, against the Milwaukee Brewers. Adkins never came to bat in his short major league career. His lifetime fielding percentage was 1.000.
