= Rickey Henderson =

American baseball player (1958–2024)

- Henderson with the Oakland Athletics in 1983
- Left fielder
- Born: December 25, 1958; Chicago, Illinois, U.S.
- Died: December 20, 2024 (aged 65); San Francisco, California, U.S.
- Batted: Right Threw: Left

MLB debut
- June 24, 1979, for the Oakland Athletics

Last MLB appearance
- September 19, 2003, for the Los Angeles Dodgers

MLB statistics
- Batting average: .279
- Hits: 3,055
- Home runs: 297
- Runs batted in: 1,115
- Stolen bases: 1,406
- Runs: 2,295
- Stats at Baseball Reference

Teams
- As player: Oakland Athletics (1979–1984); New York Yankees (1985–1989); Oakland Athletics (1989–1993); Toronto Blue Jays (1993); Oakland Athletics (1994–1995); San Diego Padres (1996–1997); Anaheim Angels (1997); Oakland Athletics (1998); New York Mets (1999–2000); Seattle Mariners (2000); San Diego Padres (2001); Boston Red Sox (2002); Los Angeles Dodgers (2003); As coach: New York Mets (2007)

Career highlights and awards
- 10× All-Star (1980, 1982–1988, 1990, 1991); 2× World Series champion (1989, 1993); AL MVP (1990); ALCS MVP (1989); Gold Glove Award (1981); 3× Silver Slugger Award (1981, 1985, 1990); 12× AL stolen base leader (1980–1986, 1988–1991, 1998); Commissioner's Historic Achievement Award; Athletics No. 24 retired; Athletics Hall of Fame; MLB records: 1,406 career stolen bases; 2,295 career runs; 130 stolen bases, single season

Member of the National

Baseball Hall of Fame
- Induction: 2009
- Vote: 94.8% (first ballot)

Rickey Nelson Henley Henderson (December 25, 1958 – December 20, 2024), nicknamed "Man of Steal", was an American professional baseball left fielder who played 25 seasons in Major League Baseball (MLB) for nine teams from 1979 to 2003, including four separate tenures with his original team, the Oakland Athletics. He is widely regarded as the greatest leadoff hitter and baserunner in the history of baseball. He holds MLB records for career stolen bases, runs, unintentional walks, and leadoff home runs. At the time of his last major league game in 2003, the 10-time American League (AL) All-Star ranked among the sport's top 100 all-time home run hitters and was its all-time leader in walks. In 2009, he was inducted to the Baseball Hall of Fame in his first year of eligibility.

Henderson holds the single-season record for stolen bases (130 in 1982) and is the only player in AL history to steal 100 bases in a season, having done so three times (in 1980, 1982, and 1983). His 1,406 career steals is nearly 50% higher than the previous record of 938 by Lou Brock. Henderson is the all-time stolen base leader for the Oakland Athletics and previously held the New York Yankees' franchise record from 1988 to 2011. He was among the league's top ten base stealers in 21 different seasons.

Henderson was named the AL's Most Valuable Player (MVP) in 1990, and he was twice the lead-off hitter for World Series champions: the 1989 Oakland Athletics and the 1993 Toronto Blue Jays. A 12-time stolen base champion, Henderson led the league in runs five times. His 25-season career elevated him to the top ten in several other categories, including career at-bats, games, and outfield putouts and total chances. His high on-base percentage, power hitting, and stolen base and run totals made him one of the most dominant and innovative players of all time. He was further known for his passion for playing baseball and a buoyant, eccentric, and quotable personality, famously often referring to himself in the third person, that both perplexed and entertained fans. Once asked if he thought Henderson was a future Hall of Famer, statistician Bill James replied, "If you could split him in two, you'd have two Hall of Famers."

== Early life ==
Rickey Nelson Henley Henderson was born on December 25, 1958, in Chicago, Illinois in the back seat of an Oldsmobile on the way to the hospital. Henderson later joked, "I was already fast. I couldn't wait." The son of John L. Henley and Bobbie Henley, he was named Rickey Nelson Henley, after singer-actor Ricky Nelson. When he was two years old, his father moved to Oakland, California. Rickey lived with his grandmother in Pine Bluff, Arkansas, from when he was two until he was seven, when he migrated to Oakland with his family. His father died in an automobile accident 10 years after leaving home. His mother married Paul Henderson in Rickey Henley's junior year of high school and the family adopted the Henderson surname.

As a child in Oakland, Henderson learned to bat right-handed although he was a naturally left-handed thrower—a rare combination for baseball players, especially non-pitchers. Through the 2008 season, only 57 position players are known to have batted right and thrown left in the Major Leagues. Henderson is by far the most successful (and the only one inducted into the Hall of Fame). Henderson later said, "All my friends were right-handed and swung from the right side, so I thought that's the way it was supposed to be done."

In 1976, Henderson graduated from Oakland Technical High School in Oakland, California, where he played baseball, basketball, and football and was an All-American running back with two 1,000-yard rushing seasons. He also ran track, but did not stay with the team as the schedule conflicted with baseball. Henderson received over a dozen scholarship offers to play football. Despite a childhood dream to play for the Oakland Raiders, he turned down the scholarships on the advice of his mother, who argued that football players had shorter careers.

== Professional career ==
=== Draft and minor leagues ===
Henderson was drafted by the Oakland Athletics in the fourth round of the 1976 Major League Baseball draft. For the first season of his minor league career he was with the Boise A's of the Northwest League. In 46 games, he batted .336 and hit three home runs and two triples. Henderson spent the following season with the Modesto A's, where he batted .345 in 134 games during a record-setting season. Henderson, along with Darrell Woodard, nearly broke the league record for team stolen bases. The Modesto A's finished the season with 357 stolen bases, just shy of the league record of 370. While Woodard tied the single-season player record with 90 stolen bases, Henderson beat the record by stealing 95 bases, and was awarded the Sundial Trophy, given to the Modesto A's Most Valuable Player.

Henderson spent the 1978 season with the Jersey City A's of the Eastern League. After the minor league season ended, he played the 1978–1979 winter season for the Navojoa Mayos of the Mexican Pacific League. He played in six games for the team, which won its first championship. In 1979, Henderson started the season with the Ogden A's of the Pacific Coast League. In 71 games for Ogden, he had a batting average of .309 and stole 44 bases.

=== Oakland Athletics (1979–1984) ===
1984 postcard of Henderson for Oakland Athletics

Henderson made his major league debut with Oakland on June 24, 1979, getting two hits in four at-bats, along with a stolen base. He batted .274 with 33 stolen bases in 89 games. In 1980, Henderson became the third modern-era player to steal 100 bases in a season (Maury Wills stole 104 in 1962, and Lou Brock stole 118 in 1974). His 100 steals broke Eddie Collins's franchise record of 81 in 1910 with the Philadelphia Athletics and set a new American League (AL) record, surpassing Ty Cobb's 96 in 1915. He also batted .303, had 179 hits (tied for ninth in AL), scored 111 runs (fourth in AL), drew 117 walks (second in AL), had a .420 on-base percentage (third in AL), and led the AL by reaching base 301 times.

That winter, Henderson played in the Puerto Rican Professional Baseball League; his 42 stolen bases broke that league's record as well.

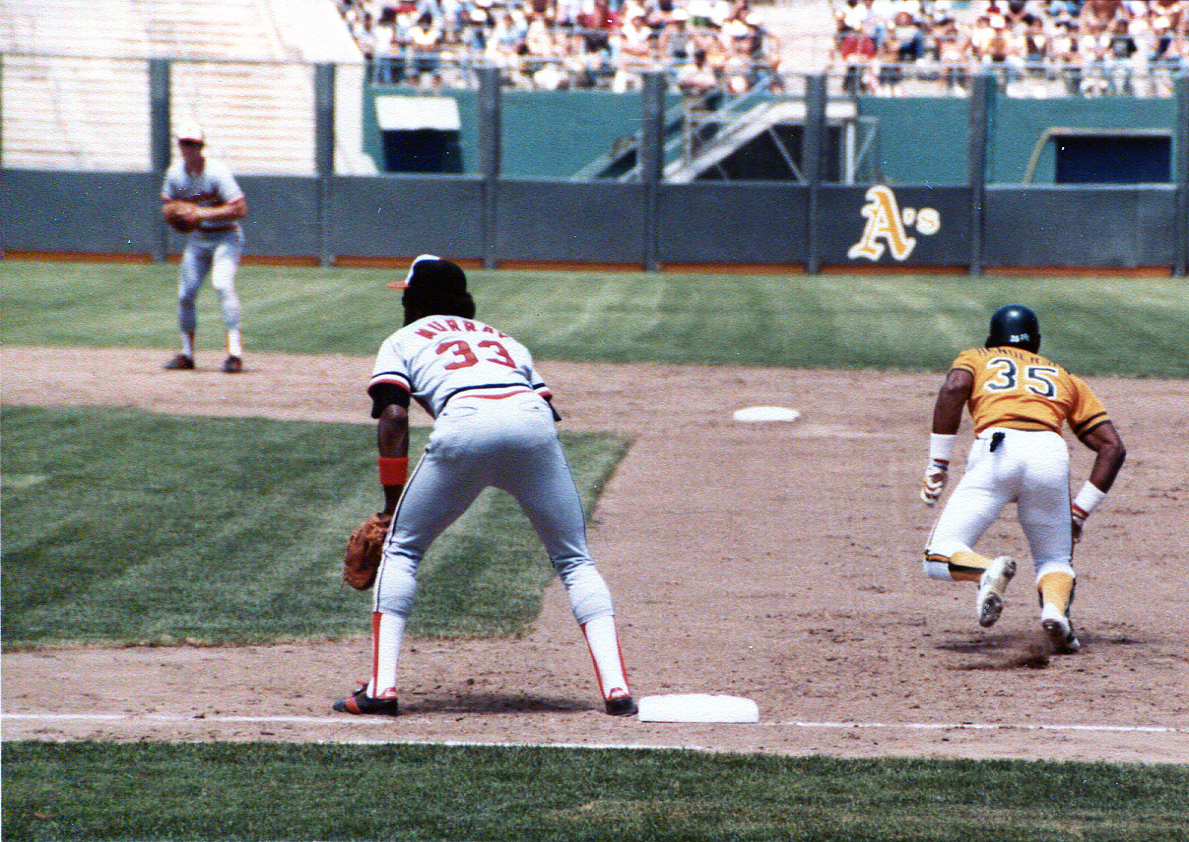
Henderson (yellow jersey; #35) goes to steal second base for the Athletics in 1983.

Henderson was an MVP candidate a year later, in a season shortened by the 1981 players' strike. He hit .319, fourth in the AL, and led the league in hits (135), runs (89), and steals (56). Henderson was also third in on-base percentage (.408), tied for second in triples (7), fourth in walks (64), eighth in total bases (185), and second in times reaching base (201). In so doing, he became the emblematic figure of Oakland manager Billy Martin's aggressive "Billy Ball" philosophy, which received much media attention. Finishing second to the Milwaukee Brewers' Rollie Fingers in the MVP voting, Henderson earned his only Gold Glove Award in fielding that season. He later became known for his showboat "snatch catches", in which he would flick his glove out at incoming fly balls, then whip his arm behind his back after making the catch.

In 1982, Henderson broke Lou Brock's modern major league single season record by stealing 130 bases, a total which has not been approached since. He stole 84 bases by the All-Star break; no player has stolen as many as 84 bases in an entire season since 1988, when Henderson himself stole 93. He also led the AL in walks (116) and was fourth in runs (119) and third in on-base percentage (.398).

Inspired by Dodger leadoff hitter Rudy Law, Henderson adopted an exaggerated crouch as his batting stance, which reduced his strike zone without sacrificing much power. Sportswriter Jim Murray described Henderson's strike zone as being "smaller than Hitler's heart". In 1982, he described his approach to Sports Illustrated:

I found that if I squatted down real low at the plate ... I could see the ball better. I also knew it threw the pitcher off. I found that I could put my weight on my back foot and still turn my hips on the swing. I'm down so low I don't have much of a strike zone. Sometimes, walking so much even gets me mad. Last year Ed Ott of the Angels got so frustrated because the umpire was calling balls that would've been strikes on anybody else that he stood up and shouted at me, "Stand up and hit like a man." I guess I do that to people.

Regarding Henderson's 1982 season, the mid-1980s book The Hidden Game of Baseball looked at such statistics as 0.78 expected runs with a runner on first and no outs, 1.07 expected runs with runner on second and no outs, and only 0.25 expected runs with no one on and one out. The authors concluded that with Henderson's 130 stolen bases he contributed 22.2 runs to the A's offense. By being caught stealing 42 times, he cost his team 20.6 runs. Therefore, the authors concluded, the net effect of his running activity was merely 1.6 extra runs for the season. A later analysis determined his net contribution was 5.3 runs for the season.

In 1983, he led the AL in stolen bases (108) and walks (103) while finishing fourth in runs scored (105). He was also second in on-base percentage (.414), tied for ninth in triples (7), and fifth in times on base, reaching 257 times.

In 1984, Henderson hit 16 home runs while leading the league in stolen bases (66) and finishing second in runs scored (113) and third in on-base-percentage (.399). After the season, he was traded to the New York Yankees along with Bert Bradley for five players: Tim Birtsas, Jay Howell, Stan Javier, Eric Plunk, and José Rijo.

=== New York Yankees (1985–1989) ===
In his first season with the Yankees, Henderson led the league in runs scored (146) and stolen bases (80), was fourth in batting average (.314), walks (99) and on-base percentage (.419), seventh in slugging (.516), third in OPS (.934). Combining his stolen bases with his 24 home runs, he became the first AL player to join the 20–50 club, and its first member to reach 20–80. He also won the Silver Slugger Award, and was third in the voting for the MVP award. His 146 runs scored were the most since Ted Williams had 150 in 1950, and he became the first player since Jimmie Foxx in 1939 to amass more runs scored than games played. Henderson also became the first player in major league history to reach 80 stolen bases and 20 home runs in the same season. He matched the feat in 1986, as did Eric Davis of the Cincinnati Reds; they remain the only players in major league history to reach those thresholds. It was with the Yankees that Henderson, who had previously worn number 35 with Oakland, which was already taken by his Yankees teammate Phil Niekro, switched to his now famous 24, a number he would wear for the rest of his career (with exceptions: (1) he briefly wore number 14 in 1993 while playing with the Blue Jays, (2) he wore his "old" number 35 in 2000 and 2002 while playing with the Mariners and the Red Sox, and (3) he wore number 25 while playing with the Dodgers).

In 1986, he led the AL in runs scored (130) and stolen bases (87) for the second year in a row, and was seventh in walks (89) and extra base hits (64) while hitting 28 home runs (9 of which led off games) and recording a career-high 74 runs batted in (RBIs).

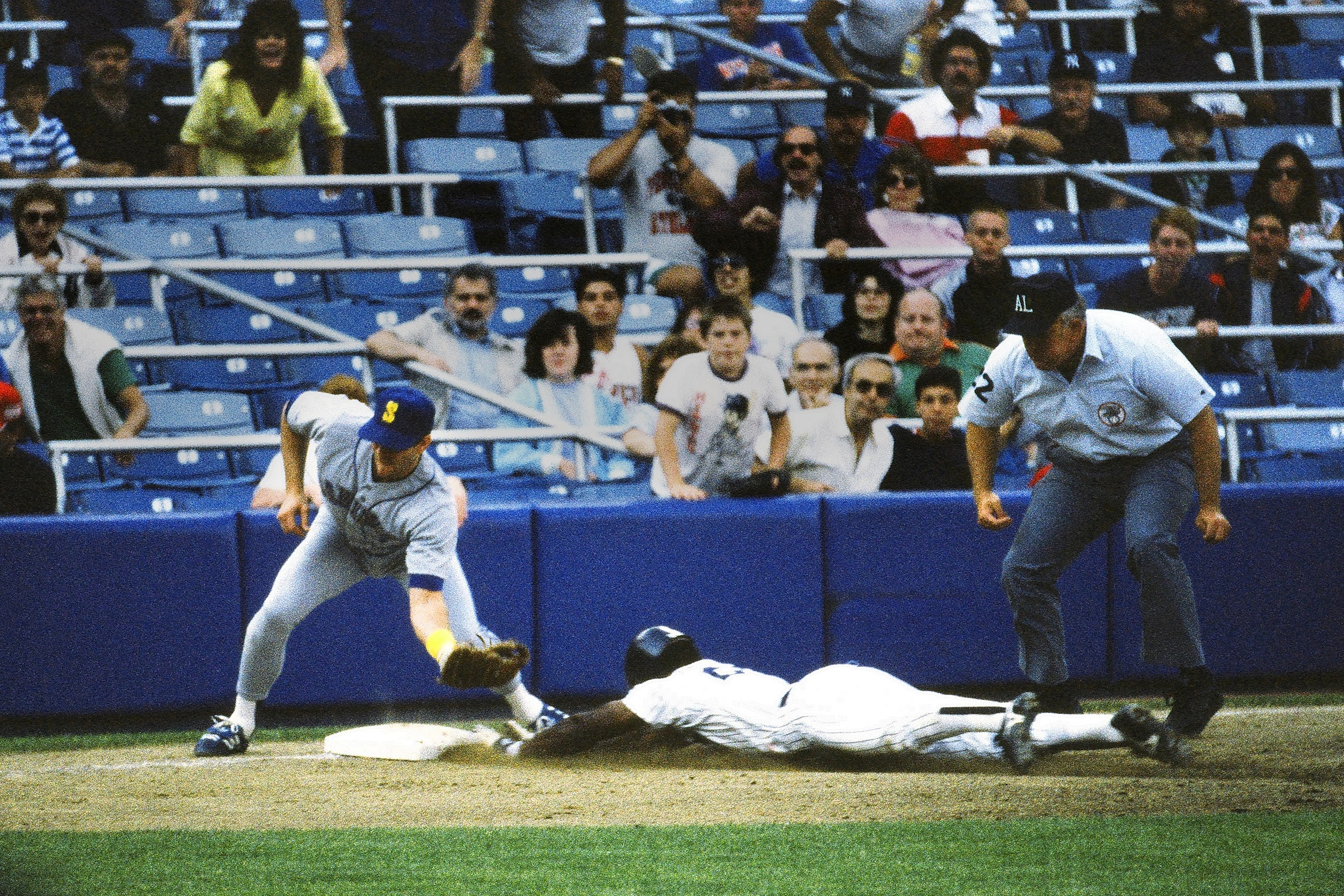
Henderson steals a base as a member of the New York Yankees in 1988

In 1987, he had a below-average season by his standards, fueling criticism from the New York media, which had never covered Henderson or his eccentricities kindly. Yankees owner George Steinbrenner issued a press release claiming that manager Lou Piniella wanted to trade Henderson for "jaking it" (playing lackadaisically). Still, Henderson had his best on-base percentage to that point in his career (.423), with a .291 batting avg., was fifth in the AL in stolen bases (41) and hit 17 home runs despite playing only 95 games. It was the only season from 1980 to 1991 in which Henderson did not lead the AL in steals. Seattle's Harold Reynolds led the league with 60 steals; Reynolds tells the story of getting an impish phone call from Henderson after the season:

The phone rings. "Henderson here." I say, "Hey, what's going on, Rickey?" I think he's calling to congratulate me, but he goes, '"Sixty stolen bases? You ought to be ashamed. Rickey would have 60 at the break"... then click, he hung up.

In 1988, Henderson led the AL in steals (93), was third in runs scored (118), fifth in OBP (.394) and seventh in walks (82), while hitting .305. Though only in New York for 4 1/2 seasons, Henderson set the Yankees' franchise record with 326 stolen bases; the previous high (248) had been held by Hal Chase, who last played for the Yankees in 1913, when the team was still known as the Highlanders. On May 28, 2011, Henderson's total was surpassed by Derek Jeter, who by that point had already played 1,700 more games as a Yankee than Henderson.

=== Second stint with Oakland Athletics (1989–1993) ===
In the final year of his contract, the Yankees and Rickey could not come to terms on an extension. On June 21, 1989, the Yankees traded Henderson back to Oakland for Plunk, Greg Cadaret, and Luis Polonia. After the trade, his 52 steals and 72 runs scored led the Athletics into the postseason; his 126 walks for the year were the most for any AL hitter since Frank Howard's 132 in 1970. Henderson was named MVP of the 1989 American League Championship Series (ALCS) after hitting .400, scoring eight runs and delivering two home runs, five RBIs, seven walks and a 1.000 slugging percentage. He had eight stolen bases in the five-game series, breaking Brock's postseason series record of seven, which he set in 1967 and repeated in 1968. (Note: Both occurred in seven-game series: the 1967 World Series and 1968 World Series.) Leading the Athletics to a four-game sweep over the San Francisco Giants and the franchise's first World Series title since 1974, Henderson hit .474 with an .895 slugging average (including two triples and a homer), while stealing three more bases. On August 22, 1989, he became Nolan Ryan's 5,000th strikeout victim, but Henderson took an odd delight in the occurrence, saying, "If you haven't been struck out by Nolan Ryan, you're nobody."

A year later, Henderson finished second in the league in batting average with a mark of .325, losing out to the Kansas City Royals' George Brett on the final day of the season. Henderson had a remarkably consistent season, with his batting average falling below .320 for only one game, the third of the year. Reaching safely by a hit or a walk in 125 of his 136 games, he led the league in runs (119), stolen bases (65), on-base percentage (.439) and OPS (1.016) was second in slugging percentage (.577), fourth in walks (97) and extra base hits (66), sixth in home runs (28) and total bases (282) and had 61 RBIs. Henderson won the AL's MVP award and helped Oakland to another pennant. He again performed well in the World Series (.333 batting, .667 slugging, a home run and three steals in four games), but the A's were swept by the underdog Cincinnati Reds.

On May 1, 1991, Henderson broke one of baseball's most noted records when he stole the 939th base of his career, one more than Brock's total compiled from 1961 to 1979, mainly with the St. Louis Cardinals. After his historic achievement, Henderson shouted out: "I'm the Greatest".

On July 16, 1993, Henderson broke the world stolen base record by stealing his 1,066th base, breaking the record held by Yutaka Fukumoto. In 90 games with Oakland, he was batting .327 with 17 home runs and 47 RBIs. He also scored 77 runs, stole 31 bases, drew 85 walks, had a .469 on-base percentage, and was slugging .553.

=== Toronto Blue Jays (1993) ===
In July 1993, the Athletics traded Henderson to the playoff-bound Toronto Blue Jays for Steve Karsay and José Herrera. He performed disappointingly for the Blue Jays, hitting only .215 in 44 games, which was probably due to the fact that he fractured a bone on his hand early on with the team, after being hit by a pitch, although he still contributed 22 stolen bases and 37 runs scored. However, his hitting woes continued in the post-season, batting .120 in the American League Championship Series and .227 in the World Series. Nevertheless, Henderson was involved in the final play of the World Series that year. He and Paul Molitor scored on Joe Carter's Series-ending home run, one of the most famous moments in baseball history.

=== Third stint with Oakland Athletics (1994–1995) ===
After the 1993 season, Henderson re-signed as a free agent with Oakland in December 1993. In 1994 and 1995, Henderson finished in the top 10 in the league in walks, steals and on-base percentage. His .300 average in 1995 marked his sixth and final season in the AL with a .300 or better average.

=== San Diego Padres (1996–1997) ===
Henderson signed with the San Diego Padres in the offseason. In 1996, he again finished in the top ten in the National League (NL) in walks, OBP, steals and runs.

=== Anaheim Angels (1997) ===
On August 13, 1997, the Padres traded Henderson to the Anaheim Angels for minor leaguers Ryan Hancock and Stevenson Agosto, as well as a player to be named later. The Padres later acquired George Arias to complete the trade. As an Angel, Henderson batted only .183 for the rest of the season.

=== Fourth stint with Oakland Athletics (1998) ===
In January 1998, Henderson signed as a free agent with the Athletics, the fourth time he played for the franchise. That season he led the majors in stolen bases (66) and the AL in walks (118), while scoring 101 runs. In so doing, the 39-year-old became the oldest player to lead a league in stolen bases, and the oldest player to reach 50 steals.

=== New York Mets (1999–2000) ===
In 1999, he was seventh in the NL in on-base percentage. Henderson was voted the 1999 National League comeback player of the year by The Sporting News. He wore number 24, which—although not officially retired—had not been regularly worn by a Mets player since Willie Mays' retirement in 1973. Nonetheless, Henderson and the Mets were an uneasy fit. After the Mets' loss in the 1999 NLCS, the New York press made much of a card game between Henderson and Bobby Bonilla. Both players had been substituted out of the lineup, and they reportedly left the dugout before the playoff game had concluded.

Henderson sought a raise on his $1.9 million salary for the 2000 season, but the Mets refused to renegotiate. He also feuded with manager Bobby Valentine and complained about traveling to Tokyo for the 2000 season opening series against the Chicago Cubs. Worse, he put in minimal effort, effectively tanking, and forcing his release. Henderson batted .219 with no home runs and two RBIs. The Mets offered him to every team in the league, with no takers. The team then put him on waivers and granted him his release in May, which Mets' general manager Steve Phillips called "addition by subtraction".

=== Seattle Mariners (2000) ===
After his release from the Mets, Henderson signed as a free agent with the Seattle Mariners. In his second game as a Mariner, on May 20, Henderson hit a leadoff home run, thus becoming the third player to hit a home run in four different decades (Ted Williams and Willie McCovey were the others). Despite starting the season in the National League, Henderson finished fourth in the AL in stolen bases (31).

=== Second stint with San Diego Padres (2001) ===
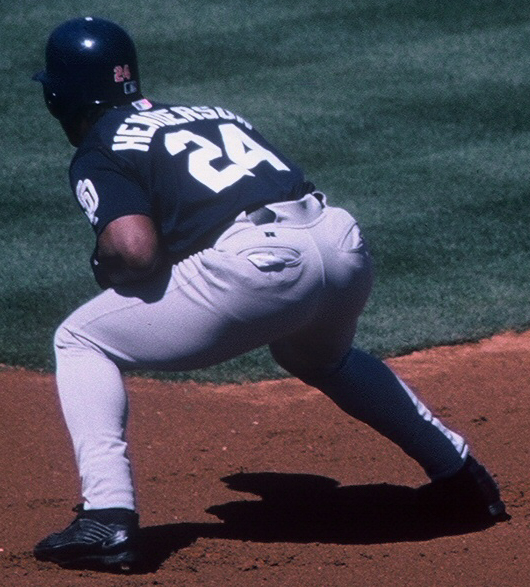
Henderson in his second stint with the San Diego Padres in 2001

A free agent in March 2001, Henderson returned to the Padres. During the 2001 season, he broke three major league career records and reached an additional major career milestone. He broke Babe Ruth's record of 2,062 career walks, Ty Cobb's record of 2,245 career runs, and Zack Wheat's record of 2,328 career games in left field, and on the final day of the season (October 7) collected his 3,000th career hit, a leadoff double off Rockies pitcher John Thomson in San Diego. That final game was also Tony Gwynn's last major league game, and Henderson had originally wanted to sit out so as not to detract from the occasion, but Gwynn insisted that Henderson play.

=== Boston Red Sox (2002) ===
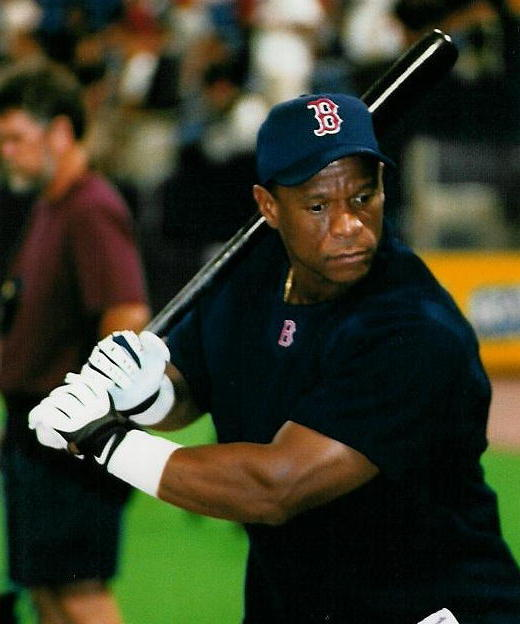
Henderson with Boston in 2002

At age 43, Henderson was the oldest player in the American League.

While playing in Boston, Henderson wore his old number 35, as his regular number 24 was already taken by Red Sox teammate Manny Ramirez.

=== Newark Bears and Los Angeles Dodgers (2003) ===
As the 2003 season began, Henderson was without a team for the first time in his career. He played in the independent Atlantic League with the Newark Bears, hoping for a chance with another major league organization. After being named the Atlantic League All-Star Game MVP, the Los Angeles Dodgers signed him in July. In 30 games with the Dodgers, he had 15 hits and three stolen bases, with a .208 batting average.

== Career statistics ==
Note: All-time MLB leader in category is in bold.

Years	G	AB	R	H	2B	3B	HR	TB	RBI	SB	CS	BB	AVG	OBP	SLG	OPS	FLD%
25	3081	10961	**2295**	3055	510	66	297	4588	1115	**1406**	**335**	2190	.279	.401	.419	.820	.979

In 60 postseason games, including 3 World Series (1989, '90, and '93), Henderson batted .284 (63-for-222) with 47 runs scored, 12 doubles, 4 triples, 5 home runs, 20 RBI, 33 stolen bases, 37 walks, .389 on-base percentage, .441 slugging percentage, and .831 on-base plus slugging percentage.

=== Retirement ===
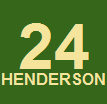
Rickey Henderson's number 24 was retired by the Oakland Athletics in 2009.

Before the 2003 season, his last in the majors, Henderson discussed his reputation for hanging onto his lengthy baseball career:

Each and every day I set a record, but we never talk about it. We'll talk about a home run hitter 24/7. Well, they haven't broken any all-time records, but they hit homers, and that's what matters nowadays. You continue playing, you accomplish a lot, and you'd think people would look at it as a fantastic career. Instead, Rickey thinks people want Rickey to quit more than anything."

Henderson played his last major league game on September 19, 2003; he was hit by a pitch in his only plate appearance, and came around to score his 2,295th run. Though it became increasingly unlikely that he would return, he continued to publicly debate his own official retirement. After leaving the Dodgers, Henderson started his second consecutive season with the Newark Bears in May 2004. In 91 games he had a .462 OBP, with more than twice as many walks (96) as strikeouts (41), and stole 37 bases while being caught only twice. On May 9, 2005, Henderson signed with the San Diego Surf Dawgs of the Golden Baseball League, an independent league. This was the Surf Dawgs' and the Golden Baseball League's inaugural season, and Henderson helped the team to the league championship. In 73 games he had a .456 OBP, with 73 walks while striking out 43 times, and 16 steals while being caught only twice. It would be his final professional season.

Henderson would not accept the end of his major league career. In May 2005, he was still insisting that he was capable of playing in the major leagues. NBC and ESPN reported that Henderson had announced his much-delayed official retirement on December 6, 2005, but his agent denied the report the following day. On February 10, 2006, he accepted a position as a hitting instructor for the Mets, while leaving the door open to returning as a player. In July 2006, Henderson discussed an offer he'd received to rejoin the Surf Dawgs for the 2006 season, which would have been his 31st in professional baseball, but suggested he'd had enough. Six weeks later, though, on August 11, he claimed "It's sort of weird not to be playing, but I decided to take a year off", adding, "I can't say I will retire. My heart is still in it... I still love the game right now, so I'm going to wait it out and see what happens."

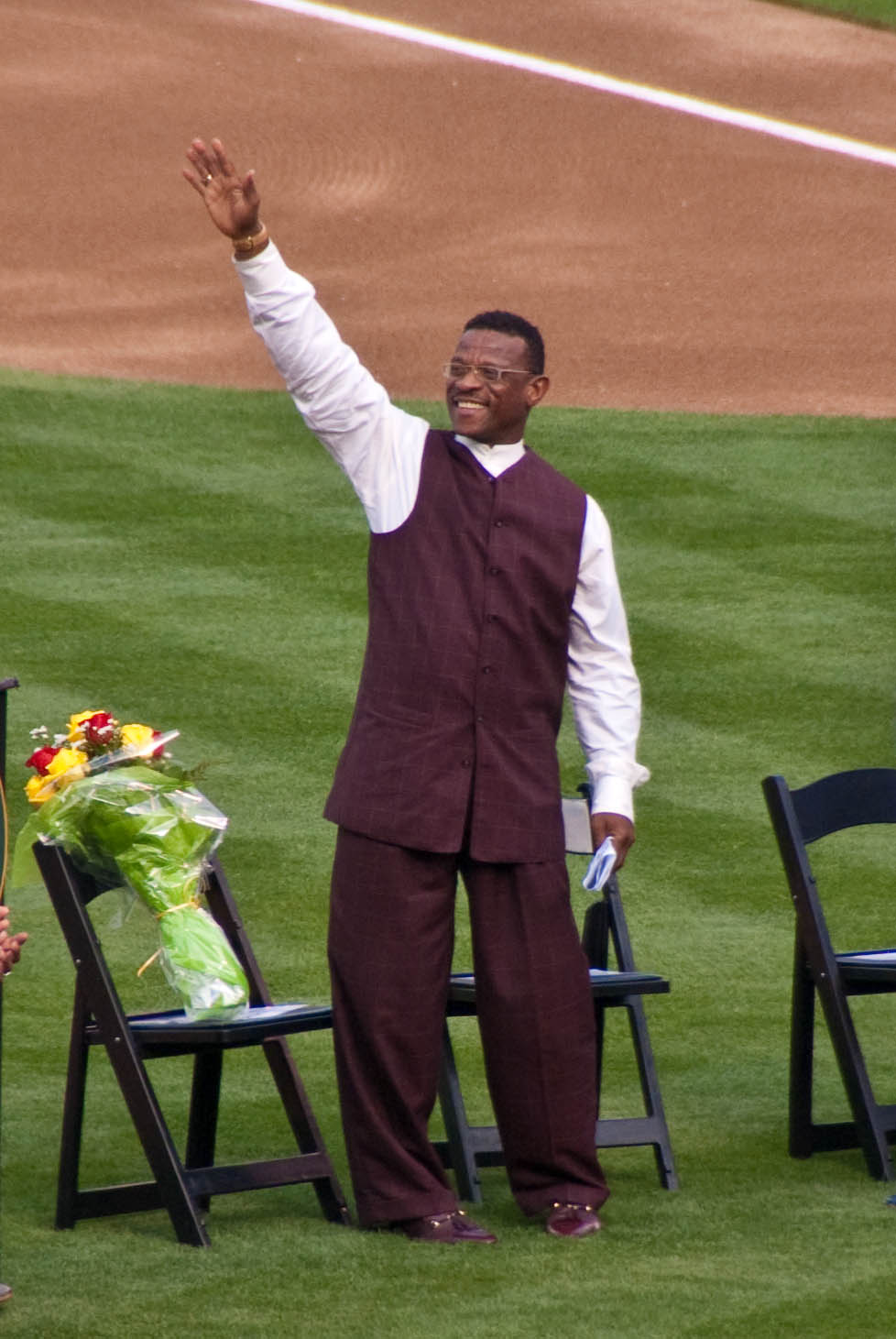
Henderson at his number retirement at Oakland–Alameda County Coliseum in August 2009

On May 18, 2007, the San Francisco Chronicle reported that Oakland general manager Billy Beane was considering adding Henderson to the roster for one game in September, provided it did not "infringe on the integrity of the roster or of the season", so that Henderson could retire as an Oakland A's player. A month later, Henderson appeared to reject the overture, saying, "One day? I don't want one day. I want to play again, man. I don't want nobody's spot... I just want to see if I deserve to be out there. If I don't, just get rid of me, release me. And if I belong, you don't have to pay me but the minimum—and I'll donate every penny of that to some charity. So, how's that hurtin' anybody?... Don't say goodbye for me... When I want that one day they want to give me so bad, I'll let you know." The Athletics retired Henderson's #24 on August 1, 2009.

Henderson finally conceded his "official retirement" on July 13, 2007: "I haven't submitted retirement papers to MLB, but I think MLB already had their papers that I was retired." Characteristically, he added, "If it was a situation where we were going to win the World Series and I was the only player that they had left, I would put on the shoes."

Contrary to speculation, Henderson's refusal to officially retire had not been delaying his eligibility for Hall of Fame induction. Since the 1970s, the five-year waiting period has been based on major league service only. Henderson was elected as part of the 2009 Hall of Fame vote, in his first appearance on the ballot. At a press conference two days after his election, the 50-year-old Henderson told reporters, "I believe today, and people say I'm crazy, but if you gave me as many at-bats that you would give the runners out there today, I would outsteal every last one of them ... they can always ring my phone and I'll come on down and help their ballclub, that's how much I love the game."

In 2011, on the 20th anniversary of his record-breaking stolen base, the Oakland A's held "Rickey Henderson Bobblehead Day". At Henderson's insistence, the giveaway plastic dolls had one atypical modification: "I told them, put a little dirt on mine, make sure that [it looks] like I'm playing the game." Almost eight years after his final game, Henderson also reiterated his desire to return: "Sometimes when I sit around and look at the game and things ain't going right, I just think, 'Just let me put on the uniform and go out there and take a chance'."

== Coaching career ==
=== New York Mets (2007) ===
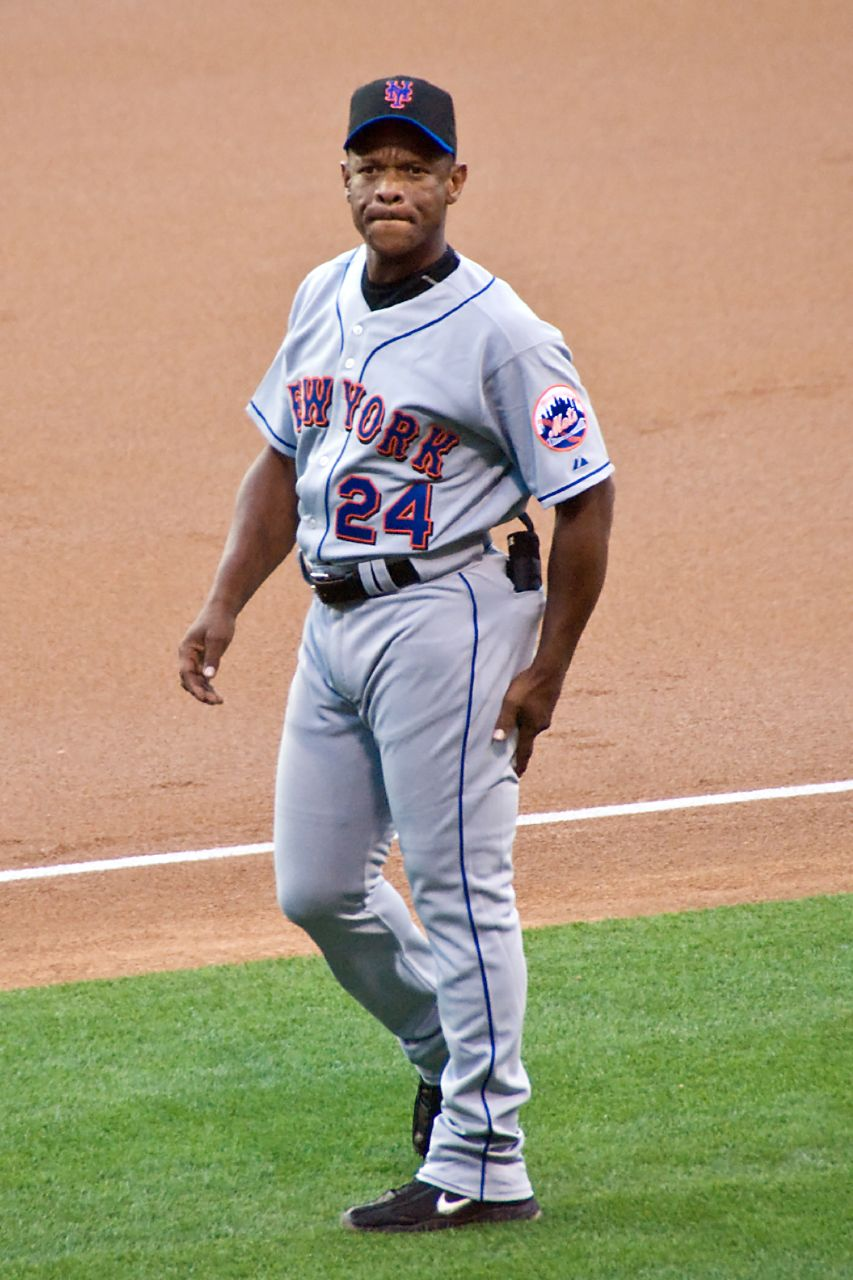
Henderson as the Mets' first base coach in 2007

The New York Mets hired Henderson as a special instructor in 2006, primarily to work with hitters and to teach base stealing. Henderson's impact was noticeable on José Reyes. "I always want to be around the game," Henderson said in May 2007. "That's something that's in my blood. Helping them have success feels just as good."

On July 13, 2007, the Mets promoted Henderson from special instructor to first base coach, replacing Howard Johnson, who became the hitting coach. Henderson was not retained as a coach for 2008. Henderson had periodically been a special instructor in the Athletics' spring training camps. In 2010, he worked on base stealing (most notably with Rajai Davis and Coco Crisp) and outfield drills.

== Image and personality ==
Sports Illustrated's Tom Verducci wrote in 2003, "There are certain figures in American history who have passed into the realm of cultural mythology, as if reality could no longer contain their stories: Johnny Appleseed. Wild Bill Hickok. Davy Crockett. Rickey Henderson. They exist on the sometimes narrow margin between Fact and Fiction."

Henderson referred to himself in the third-person.

According to Verducci, during one off-season, Henderson called Padres general manager Kevin Towers and left this message: "Kevin, this is Rickey. Calling on behalf of Rickey. Rickey wants to play baseball." However, Henderson denied that this happened in a February 26, 2009, interview on Mike and Mike in the Morning. In 2003, he discussed his unusual phraseology, saying, "People are always saying, 'Rickey says Rickey.' But it's been blown way out of proportion. Rickey says it when Rickey doesn't do what Rickey needs to be doing. Rickey uses it to remind himself, like, 'Rickey, what you doing, you stupid. ... ' Rickey's just scolding himself." Henderson did use the first person pronoun on occasion, such as when he defended his position during a contract dispute: "All I'm asking for is what I want."

Henderson was so proud of a $1 million signing bonus that he framed it instead of cashing it, thus losing several months' interest. Similarly, Henderson refused to spend his per diem money that all players receive on road trips: instead, he would put the envelopes containing the cash in a box, and when one of his children performed well in school he would invite them to choose an envelope out of the box and keep its contents. In 2002, following an argument with pitcher Orlando Hernández, Henderson stated, "He needs to grow up a little bit. I ain't a kid. When I broke into the game, he was crawling on his hands and knees. Unless he's as old as I am. He probably is." (Hernández is approximately seven years younger.)

Henderson had a reputation for forgetting or not learning people's names, including those of his teammates.

There are many unconfirmed stories about Henderson. A Padres teammate (variously reported as Steve Finley or Tony Gwynn) once offered him a seat anywhere on the bus, saying that Henderson had tenure. Henderson supposedly replied, "Ten years? What are you talking about? Rickey got 16, 17 years." One widely reported story was a fabrication that began as a clubhouse joke made by a visiting player. While playing for Seattle in 2000, Henderson was said to have commented on first baseman John Olerud's practice of wearing a batting helmet while playing defense, noting that a former teammate in Toronto did the same thing. Olerud was reported to have replied, "That was me." The two men had been together the previous season with the 1999 Mets, as well as with the 1993 World Champion Blue Jays. Several news outlets originally reported the story as fact.

Verducci wrote, "Rickey is the modern-day Yogi Berra, only faster." Henderson himself was resigned to his persona: "A lot of stuff they had me doing or something they said I had created, it's comedy. I guess that's how they want to judge me, as a character."

A bobblehead of Henderson as an Athletic appeared in Toy Story 4.

== Personal life and death ==
In 1983, Henderson married his high-school sweetheart, Pamela. They had three children.

Henderson died on December 20, 2024, five days before his 66th birthday, at the University of California, San Francisco Medical Center following a bout of pneumonia. According to Dave Stewart, Henderson, who was asthmatic and endured related sinus issues, was admitted to the hospital that day for a related surgery, but never recovered. News of Henderson's death spread that evening on X as an unconfirmed rumor, but was not confirmed by his family in the media until the following day.

== Legacy ==
It took a long time, huh [Pause for cheers] First of all, I would like to thank God for giving me the opportunity. I want to thank the Haas family, the Oakland organization, the city of Oakland, and all you beautiful fans for supporting me. [Pause for cheers] Most of all, I'd like to thank my mom, my friends, and loved ones for their support. I want to give my appreciation to Tom Trebelhorn and the late Billy Martin. Billy Martin was a great manager. He was a great friend to me. I love you, Billy. I wish you were here. [Pause for cheers] Lou Brock was the symbol of great base stealing. But today, I'm the greatest of all time. Thank you.

— Rickey Henderson's full speech after breaking Lou Brock's record.

On May 1, 1991, Henderson stole his 939th base to pass Lou Brock and became the sport's all-time stolen base leader. Henderson's speech after breaking Brock's record was similar to the standard victory or award speech. He thanked God and his mother, as well as the people that helped him in baseball. Because his idol was Muhammad Ali, Henderson decided to use the words "greatest of all time." These words have since been taken by many to support the notion that Henderson is selfish and arrogant, although years later, Henderson revealed that he had gone over his planned remarks ahead of time with Brock, and the Cardinals Hall of Famer "had no problem with it. In fact, he helped me write what I was going to say that day." On the day of the speech, Brock later told reporters amiably, "He spoke from his heart." Brock and Henderson had had a friendly relationship ever since their first meeting in 1981. Brock pronounced the young speedster as the heir to his record, saying, "How are we gonna break it?"

Henderson later felt that the statement overshadowed his accomplishments.

At the end of his July 2009 Hall of Fame induction, Henderson alluded to his earlier speech, saying:

In closing, I would like to say my favorite hero was Muhammad Ali. He said at one time, quote, "I am the greatest," end of quote. That is something I always wanted to be. And now that the Association has voted me into the Baseball Hall of Fame, my journey as a player is complete. I am now in the class of the greatest players of all time. And at this moment, I am ... [pause] ... very, very humble. Thank you.

Asked if he believes the passage of time will improve his reputation, Henderson said that he was simply telling the truth about his accomplishments rather than being cocky.

Henderson had 468 more stolen bases in his career than Brock, one short of 50% more than the game's second-most prolific basestealer. In 1993, Henderson stole his 1,066th base, surpassing the world record established ten years earlier by Yutaka Fukumoto for the Hankyu Braves in Japan's Pacific League. In his prime, Henderson had a virtual monopoly on the stolen base title in the American League. Between 1980 and 1991, he led the league in steals every season except 1987, when he missed part of the season due to a nagging hamstring injury, allowing Mariners second baseman Harold Reynolds to win the title. Henderson had one more league-leading season after that stretch, when his 66 steals in 1998 made him the oldest steals leader in baseball history. Perhaps unsurprisingly, Henderson also owns the record for times caught stealing (335). Due to incomplete historical recordkeeping for that statistic, though, it is unknown whether he is the actual career leader. However, Henderson's overall 81% success rate on the basepaths is among the highest percentages in history. (Carlos Beltran ranks first among players with at least 300 career attempts, at just over 86%.)

On July 29, 1989, Henderson stole five bases against the Mariners' left-handed Randy Johnson, his career high, and one shy of the single-game major league record. Unusually, Henderson was hitless in the game (he had four walks). Henderson had 18 four-steal games during his career. In August 1983, in a three-game series against the Brewers and a 2-game series versus the Yankees, Henderson had 13 stolen bases in five games. Baltimore Orioles third baseman Floyd Rayford described the confusion he felt during a particular game, when Henderson was leading off first base and signaling him with two fingers. Henderson quickly stole second base, then third, and Rayford understood the gesture.

Longtime scout Charlie Metro remembered the havoc caused by Henderson: '"I did a lot of study and I found that it's impossible to throw Rickey Henderson out. I started using stopwatches and everything. I found it was impossible to throw some other guys out also. They can go from first to second in 2.9 seconds; and no pitcher catcher combination in baseball could throw from here to there to tag second in 2.9 seconds, it was always 3, 3.1, 3.2. So actually, the runner that can make the continuous, regular move like Rickey's can't be thrown out, and he's proven it."

Sportswrite Joe Posnanski marveled that Henderson had 796 career walks when leading off an inning, more than Lou Brock, Roberto Clemente, Luis Aparicio, Ernie Banks, Kirby Puckett, Ryne Sandberg, "and more than 50 other Hall of Famers walked in their entire careers."

Henderson was a headfirst slider. In September 2008, Henderson discussed his base-stealing technique at length with Sports Illustrated. He wanted to protect his body, and he figured that since running was more important to him, headfirst was best since it would wear on his shoulders and hands, while feet-first would wear on his knees and legs. He also attributed his diving technique to asking a pilot how he smoothly landed a plane. According to Henderson, diving when running upright took longer to hit the ground, while getting lower took less time:

I was hitting the dirt so smooth, so fast, when I hit the dirt, there wasn't no hesitation. It was like a skid mark, like you throw a rock on the water and skid off it. So when I hit the ground, if you didn't have the tag down, I was by you. No matter if the ball beat me, I was by you. That was what made the close plays go my way, I think.

Padres closer Trevor Hoffman said, "I don't know how to put into words how fortunate I was to spend time around one of the icons of the game. I can't comprehend that yet. Years from now, though, I'll be able to say I played with Rickey Henderson, and I imagine it will be like saying I played with Babe Ruth." When Henderson was 44 years old and playing for the Newark Bears in 2003, Padres general manager Kevin Towers said, "I get e-mails daily from fans saying, 'Sign Rickey.'... I get more calls and e-mails about him than anybody... We've had some special players come through San Diego. But there's an aura about him nobody else has."

Tony La Russa, Henderson's manager in the late 1980s in Oakland, said, "He rises to the occasion—the big moment—better than anybody I've ever seen." Coach Rene Lachemann said, "If you're one run down, there's nobody you'd ever rather have up at the plate than Rickey." Teammate Mitchell Page said, "It wasn't until I saw Rickey that I understood what baseball was about. Rickey Henderson is a run, man. That's it. When you see Rickey Henderson, I don't care when, the score's already 1–0. If he's with you, that's great. If he's not, you won't like it."

A's pitching coach Dave Duncan said of Henderson, "You have to be careful because he can knock one out. But you don't want to be too careful because he's got a small strike zone and you can't afford to walk him. And that's only half the problem. When he gets on base he's more trouble still." Sportswriter Tom Verducci wrote, "Baseball is designed to be an egalitarian sort of game in which one player among the 18 is not supposed to dominate... Yet in the past quarter-century Henderson and Barry Bonds have come closest to dominating a baseball game the way Michael Jordan could a basketball game."

In July 2007, New York Sun sportswriter Tim Marchman posited that Henderson's accomplishments were "not because of his body, but because of his brain". He praised his ability to detect if a pitcher was throwing to first or home plate, and his discipline to coax walks as a means to get on base. He added:

Maybe he'd get a bit more credit for all this if he were some boring drip like Cal Ripken Jr., blathering on endlessly about humility and apple pie and tradition and whatever else, but we're all better off with things the way they are... Everyone had their fun when he broke Lou Brock's stolen base record and proclaimed, 'I am the greatest', but he was, of course, just saying what was plainly true."

=== Career milestones ===
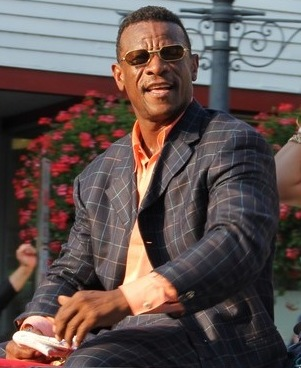
Henderson at the Hall of Fame parade in 2011

As of 2026, Henderson ranks first all-time in runs scored (2,295) and stolen bases (1,406), fourth in career games played (3,081), 13th in at bats (10,961), and 27th in hits (3,055). He has the second-highest career power–speed number, behind Barry Bonds, at 490.4. Henderson reached at least 20 homers and 50 steals in the same season a record four times. His record for most career walks (2,190) was broken by Bonds; Henderson is now second but continues to hold the record for most unintentional walks (2,129). While his career batting average of .279 is considered somewhat modest for a leadoff hitter, his walks helped him post a stout .401 on-base percentage (OBP) for his career. He posted an OBP of at least .400 in 16 separate seasons, with a high mark of .439 in his 1990 MVP season. Henderson averaged 115 walks per 162 games over his career.

Henderson also holds the record for most home runs to lead off a game, with 81; George Springer is second with 63, as of March 2026. During the 2003 season, Henderson surpassed Babe Ruth for the career record in secondary bases (total bases compiled from extra base hits, walks, stolen bases, and times hit by pitch). In 1993, he led off both games of a doubleheader with homers. At the time of his last major league game, Henderson was still in the all-time top 100 home run hitters, with 297. Bill James wrote in 2000, "Without exaggerating one inch, you could find fifty Hall of Famers who, all taken together, don't own as many records, and as many important records, as Rickey Henderson."

Henderson's record for the most postseason stolen bases was broken by Kenny Lofton's 34th career steal during the 2007 ALCS; Henderson is the only American League player to steal more than 100 bases in a single season (having accomplished the feat three times), and he is the all-time stolen base leader for the Oakland A's.

In 1999, before breaking the career records for runs scored and walks, Henderson was ranked number 51 on The Sporting News' list of the 100 Greatest Baseball Players, and was a nominee for the Major League Baseball All-Century Team. In 2005, The Sporting News updated their 100 Greatest Players list, and Henderson had inched up to number 50. On January 12, 2009, Henderson was elected to the Baseball Hall of Fame in his first year on the ballot, receiving 94.8% of the vote. This was the 13th highest percentage in major league history.

Asked to choose the best player in history, Henderson declined, saying, "There are guys who have done different things very well, but I don't know of anyone who mastered everything." Offered the chance to assess his own placement among the game's greats, he said, "I haven't mastered the homers or RBI. The little things, I probably mastered." Of his various records and achievements, he valued his career-runs-scored mark the most: "You have to score to win."

=== Records ===
MLB Records
Accomplishment	Record	Refs
Career
Most stolen bases	1,406	
Most times caught stealing	335	
Most runs scored	2,295	
Most games led off with a home run	81	
Most unintentional walks	2,129	
Most consecutive seasons – 1 or more HR	25	
Most seasons leading the league in stolen bases	12	
Single-season
Most stolen bases	130 (1982)	
Most times caught stealing	42 (1982)	
Most stolen bases in a single postseason series	8 (1989 ALCS)	
Most stolen bases in a single postseason	11 (1989)	

=== Awards and honors ===
Award/Honor	# of Times	Dates	Refs
American League All-Star	10	1980, 1982–88, 1990–91	
American League Championship Series MVP	1	1989	
American League Gold Glove Award (OF)	1	1981 (strike shortened)	
American League hits champion	1	1981	
American League MVP	1	1990	
American League Silver Slugger Award (OF)	3	1981, 1985, 1990	
American League stolen base champion	12	1980–86, 1988–91, 1998	
American League walks leader	4	1982–83, 1989, 1998	
Major league on-base percentage leader	1	1990	
Major league runs scored leader	5	1981, 1985–86, 1989–90	
Major league stolen base champion	6	1980, 1982–83, 1988–89, 1998	
TSN Comeback Player of the Year Award	1	1999	
World Series champion	2	1989 (Oakland A's); 1993 (Toronto Blue Jays)	

== See also ==
- List of Major League Baseball career home run leaders
- List of Major League Baseball career stolen bases leaders
- List of Major League Baseball players who played in four decades
- List of Major League Baseball career doubles leaders
- List of Major League Baseball career runs scored leaders
- List of Major League Baseball career runs batted in leaders
- List of Major League Baseball annual runs scored leaders
- List of Major League Baseball annual stolen base leaders
- List of Major League Baseball stolen base records
- Major League Baseball titles leaders

== Notes ==
Achievements
Preceded by Lou Brock	Major League Baseball single season stolen base record holder 1982–present	Succeeded by current
Preceded by Lou Brock	Major League Baseball career stolen base record holder 1991–present	Succeeded by current
Preceded by Ty Cobb	Major League Baseball career runs scored record holder 2001–present	Succeeded by current
Preceded by Babe Ruth	Major League Baseball career bases on balls record holder 2001–2004	Succeeded by Barry Bonds
