= Kevin Maas =

American baseball player (born 1965)

- Designated hitter / First baseman
- Born: January 20, 1965 (age 61); Castro Valley, California, U.S.
- Batted: Left Threw: Left

Professional debut
- MLB: June 29, 1990, for the New York Yankees
- NPB: June 30, 1996, for the Hanshin Tigers

Last appearance
- MLB: June 20, 1995, for the Minnesota Twins
- NPB: October 9, 1996, for the Hanshin Tigers

MLB statistics
- Batting average: .230
- Home runs: 65
- Runs batted in: 169

NPB statistics
- Batting average: .245
- Home runs: 8
- Runs batted in: 42
- Stats at Baseball Reference

Teams
- New York Yankees (1990–1993); Minnesota Twins (1995); Hanshin Tigers (1996)

Kevin Christian Maas (born January 20, 1965) is an American former Major League Baseball player. Originally viewed as a top prospect for the New York Yankees he was unable to replicate the success of his rookie year and played for two major league ballclubs over five years.

== Professional career ==
The New York Yankees selected Maas in the 22nd round of the 1986 draft after attending the University of California. He made his major league debut for the Yankees on June 29, 1990 when they called him up from the Columbus Clippers. It was hoped that he would be the heir to Don Mattingly. His first Major League hit was a single off Jack McDowell.

He started his big league career on a tear, setting a record for the fewest at bats (72) to hit 10 home runs (since broken by Shane Spencer in 1998). He also set a record for fastest rookie to 13 and 15 with 110 and 133 at-bats, thirteen fewer than Sam Horn took to reach 13 and two fewer than Wally Berger took to reach 15. He was helped by a three-game series at Texas when he homered in each game of the series. At the end of the 1990 season, Maas had hit 21 home runs in 79 games and he finished second in The Sporting News Rookie of the Year Award voting to Sandy Alomar Jr. of the Cleveland Indians.

Maas was a left-handed batter. As a result, many of his home runs went into the right field stands. About halfway through the season a group of a dozen or so young ladies began wearing "Maas-tops" to the Yankees home games and sitting in the right field stands. Whenever Maas hit a home run to right, the girls would get up, remove their tops and jump up and down until Maas finished circling the bases.

The following season he served as the Yankees designated hitter and occasional fill-in for Mattingly at first base. Even though he played in 148 games, his sophomore season was not as successful as his first. He did hit 23 home runs (in 500 at bats), but hit just .220 with 128 strikeouts.

By 1992, Maas was shuffling back and forth between the major and minor leagues. He was released by the Yankees in 1994. He bounced around between San Diego, Cincinnati, and Minnesota. He briefly returned to the majors in 1995 with Minnesota. Maas then signed with the Hanshin Tigers of Japan's Central League in 1996 to replace Glenn Davis. His ouendan theme with the Tigers was similar to club legend Randy Bass, due to their similarities in name, but the Tigers ouendan stopped using it when Maas was nowhere near the level of Bass.

== Personal life ==
As of 2008, Maas works at Charles Schwab as a financial consultant in his hometown of Castro Valley, California. He is divorced and has a daughter named Lacey and a son named Christian. He is regularly invited to Old-Timers' Day at the Yankee Stadium and participated in the 2008, 2011, and 2017 games.
