= Claudell Washington =

American baseball player (1954–2020)

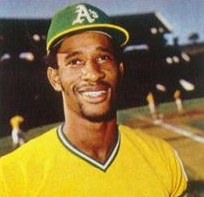
- Outfielder
- Born: August 31, 1954; Los Angeles, California, U.S.
- Died: June 10, 2020 (aged 65); Orinda, California, U.S.
- Batted: Left Threw: Left

MLB debut
- July 5, 1974, for the Oakland Athletics

Last MLB appearance
- June 18, 1990, for the New York Yankees

MLB statistics
- Batting average: .278
- Home runs: 164
- Runs batted in: 824
- Stats at Baseball Reference

Teams
- Oakland Athletics (1974–1976); Texas Rangers (1977–1978); Chicago White Sox (1978–1980); New York Mets (1980); Atlanta Braves (1981–1986); New York Yankees (1986–1988); California Angels (1989–1990); New York Yankees (1990)

Career highlights and awards
- 2× All-Star (1975, 1984); World Series champion (1974)

Claudell Washington (August 31, 1954 – June 10, 2020) was an American baseball outfielder who played seventeen seasons in Major League Baseball (MLB). He played for the Oakland Athletics, Texas Rangers, Chicago White Sox, New York Mets, Atlanta Braves, New York Yankees, and California Angels from 1974 until 1990. He batted and threw left-handed.

Washington was signed as an undrafted free agent by the Oakland Athletics in 1972 and played for three of their minor league affiliates until 1974, when the Athletics promoted him to the major leagues. He won the World Series that year and was selected as an All-Star in 1975. After spending three seasons with the organization, he was traded to the Texas Rangers. He was subsequently dealt to the Chicago White Sox and the New York Mets. He signed with the Atlanta Braves as a free agent in 1980 and was named an All-Star again in 1984. He later played for the New York Yankees and California Angels. He returned to the Yankees in 1990 and played his last game on June 18 that year.

== Early life ==
Washington was born in Los Angeles, on August 31, 1954, and was raised in Berkeley. He attended Berkeley High School and also worked as a janitor. He never played for his school's baseball team because the coach wanted him to pitch, while he desired to be an outfielder. He was nonetheless scouted while playing sandlot ball by Jim Guinn, who worked for the Oakland Athletics. Guinn signed Washington as an undrafted free agent to a contract worth US$3,000 (equivalent to approximately $18,500 in 2020) in 1972.

== Professional baseball career ==
Washington was one of the youngest All-Stars in major league history when he was named to the 1975 American League (AL) All-Star team at the age of 20. He finished fifth in the AL in batting average with a mark of .308 and second in stolen bases with a total of 40. Prior to the 1977 season, Washington was traded to the Texas Rangers for second baseman Rodney Scott and left-handed pitcher Jim Umbarger.

Washington was dealt along with Rusty Torres from the Rangers to the Chicago White Sox for Bobby Bonds on May 16, 1978. After struggling in 1978, both before and after the trade, Washington bounced back with a solid 1979 campaign. He was traded once again midway through the following season to the New York Mets for a minor leaguer.

Speed was Washington's ally, but he was also capable of showing outbursts of power. On July 14, 1979, while playing for the Chicago White Sox, Washington hit three home runs in one game. He repeated this feat on June 22, 1980, while playing for the New York Mets. He became the third player to hit three home runs in a game in both the AL and the National League (NL), after Babe Ruth and Johnny Mize.

Washington became a free agent after the 1980 season, and signed with the Atlanta Braves before the 1981 season. Washington spent the next five and a half seasons with the Braves, and was named NL Player of the Month in September, 1982, and was named to the All-Star team again in 1984.

In 1985, Washington was among a number of players caught up in the Pittsburgh drug trials scandal. In 1986, he was given a 60-day suspension but was allowed to continue playing if he donated five percent of his base salary and contributed 50 hours of drug-related community service.

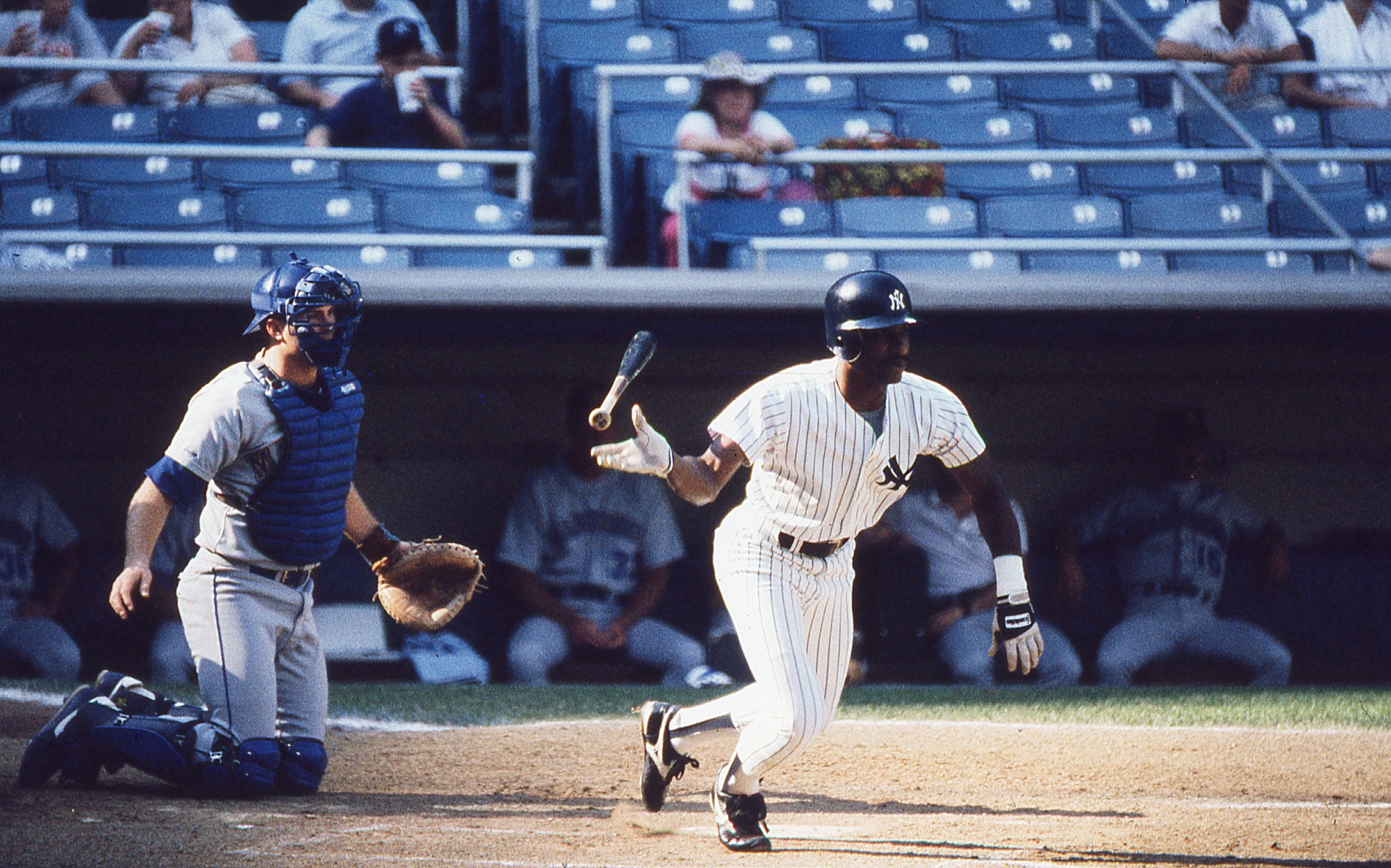
Washington playing for the Yankees at Yankee Stadium on August 19, 1988

Washington was traded in June 1986, from the Braves to the New York Yankees, along with Paul Zuvella, for outfielder Ken Griffey, Sr. and infielder Andre Robertson. He re-signed with the Yankees after the 1986 season, and spent two more years with the Yankees. In April 1988, he hit the Yankees' 10,000th franchise home run. After the 1988 season, Washington once again became a free agent, and signed a contract with the California Angels. Washington was part of yet another mid-season trade in April 1990, when he was traded back to the Yankees, along with Rich Monteleone, for outfielder Luis Polonia.

Washington was eventually released by the Yankees, and retired following the 1990 season. He finished his career with 164 home runs, 824 RBI, 312 stolen bases and a lifetime batting average of .278.

Washington struck out 39 times against pitcher Nolan Ryan, more times than any other batter.

== Death ==
Washington died on June 10, 2020, at a hospital in the East Bay. He was 65, and had been suffering from prostate cancer since 2017. He chose to stop treatment the following year.

== In popular culture ==
Game footage of Washington with Atlanta appears in the 1986 movie Ferris Bueller's Day Off. In the film, Washington hits a foul ball at a Cubs game, which is caught by the film's title character, who was supposedly sick at home from school. The footage was taken from a game played on June 5, 1985.

== See also ==
- List of doping cases in sport
- List of Major League Baseball career stolen bases leaders

Preceded by Bill Buckner	National League Player of the Month; September 1982	Succeeded by Terry Kennedy
