= Kevin Mmahat =

American baseball player (born 1964)

- Pitcher
- Born: November 9, 1964 (age 61); Memphis, Tennessee, U.S.
- Batted: Left Threw: Left

MLB debut
- September 9, 1989, for the New York Yankees

Last MLB appearance
- October 1, 1989, for the New York Yankees

MLB statistics
- Games pitched: 4
- Win–loss record: 0–2
- Earned run average: 12.91
- Strikeouts: 3
- Stats at Baseball Reference

Teams
- New York Yankees (1989)

Kevin Paul Mmahat (Mama-Hat) (born November 9, 1964) is an American former Major League Baseball (MLB) pitcher.

== Biography ==
Mmahat was born in Memphis, Tennessee and graduated from Tulane University, where he pitched for the Tulane Green Wave baseball team. He was drafted by the Texas Rangers in the 31st round of the 1987 Major League Baseball draft, and was traded to the New York Yankees a year later.

Mmahat made his MLB debut on September 9, 1989 and played in his final MLB game on October 1, 1989. In his MLB career, Mmahat pitched 7 2/3 innings and attained an ERA of 12.91.

== Personal life ==
He is married to the former Gina Tedesco with whom he has three children.

He owns and operates an exterior coating company called Mid South Coatings in New Orleans, Louisiana.
