= Bob Davidson (pitcher) =

German baseball player (born 1963)

- Pitcher
- Born: January 6, 1963 (age 63); Bad Kreuznach, West Germany
- Batted: Right Threw: Right

MLB debut
- July 15, 1989, for the New York Yankees

Last MLB appearance
- July 15, 1989, for the New York Yankees

MLB statistics
- Win–loss record: 0-0
- Earned run average: 18.00
- Strikeouts: 0
- Stats at Baseball Reference

Teams
- New York Yankees (1989)

Robert Banks Davidson (born January 6, 1963) is a former Major League Baseball pitcher who played for the New York Yankees in 1989.

== Biography ==
A native of Bad Kreuznach, West Germany, Davidson attended East Carolina University. In 1983, he played collegiate summer baseball with the Hyannis Mets of the Cape Cod Baseball League. Davidson was drafted by the New York Yankees in the 24th round of the 1984 MLB draft.

In one career MLB game with New York, he had a 0–0 record with an 18.00 ERA. On July 15, 1989, he worked one inning, giving up a two-run home run to Baseball Hall of Famer George Brett.
