= Greg Cadaret =

American baseball player (born 1962)

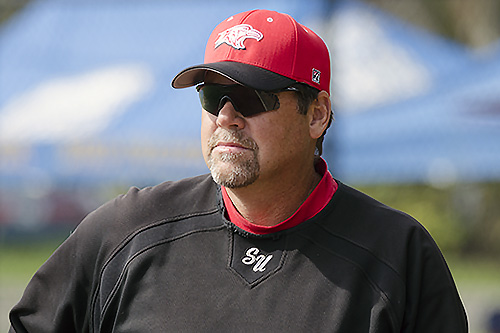
- Pitcher
- Born: February 27, 1962 (age 63); Detroit, Michigan, U.S.
- Batted: Left Threw: Left

MLB debut
- July 5, 1987, for the Oakland Athletics

Last MLB appearance
- September 26, 1998, for the Texas Rangers

MLB statistics
- Win–loss record: 38–32
- Earned run average: 3.99
- Strikeouts: 539
- Stats at Baseball Reference

Teams
- Oakland Athletics (1987–1989); New York Yankees (1989–1992); Cincinnati Reds (1993); Kansas City Royals (1993); Toronto Blue Jays (1994); Detroit Tigers (1994); Anaheim Angels (1997–1998); Texas Rangers (1998)

Gregory James Cadaret (born February 27, 1962) is an American former professional baseball relief pitcher. He played in Major League Baseball (MLB) from 1987 to 1998 for the Oakland Athletics, New York Yankees, Cincinnati Reds, Kansas City Royals, Toronto Blue Jays, Detroit Tigers, Anaheim Angels, and Texas Rangers.

== Career ==
Cadaret attended Grand Valley State University, where he played college baseball for the Grand Valley State Lakers. He was the first-ever player to be drafted from that school.

Cadaret started his career in the minor league with the Medford A's and helped them win the 1983 Northwest League Championship in his rookie season. Cadaret appeared in the 1988 World Series as a member of the Oakland Athletics. On June 21, 1989, the Athletics traded Cadaret, Eric Plunk, and Luis Polonia to the New York Yankees for Rickey Henderson.

In 451 games, Cadaret tallied a 38–32 record, with 14 saves, 539 strikeouts and a 3.99 ERA.

Greg established the "Greg Cadaret Baseball Endowment" at Grand Valley State University in 1992 to support the varsity baseball team.

== Post-playing career ==
After Cadaret's playing career ended, he began coaching and managing. He coached baseball at Simpson University and spent one year as manager of the Redding Colt 45s of the Horizon Air Summer Series in Redding, California. He was named manager of the Golden Baseball League's Chico Outlaws on December 4, 2008. He currently resides at his ranch in Shingletown, California.

On July 24, 2009, Cadaret was fired by the Outlaws after going 20–25 in the 2009 season. He was replaced by hitting coach Kory DeHaan.

On March 21, 2011, Comcast SportsNet California announced that they had hired Cadaret as a studio analyst for the Oakland A's 2011 season.

He was hired as pitching coach of the independent Traverse City Beach Bums minor-league team on March 10, 2014.

He was the head coach at Simpson University from April 2014 through January 2018.

Cadaret has previously been the Pitching Coach for the Lake Erie Crushers in the Frontier League.

== Personal life ==
Greg graduated from Central Montcalm High School, in Stanton, Michigan, in 1980. He also graduated from Grand Valley State University.
