= Steve Kiefer =

American baseball player

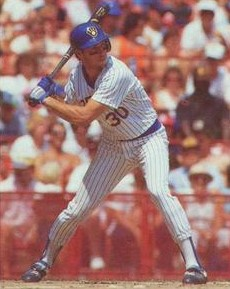
- Third baseman
- Born: October 18, 1960 (age 65); Chicago, Illinois, U.S.
- Batted: Right Threw: Right

MLB debut
- September 3, 1984, for the Oakland Athletics

Last MLB appearance
- August 22, 1989, for the New York Yankees

MLB statistics
- Batting average: .192
- Home runs: 7
- Runs batted in: 30
- Stats at Baseball Reference

Teams
- Oakland Athletics (1984–1985); Milwaukee Brewers (1986–1988); New York Yankees (1989)

Steven George Kiefer (born October 18, 1960) is an American former professional baseball third baseman. He played in Major League Baseball (MLB) from 1984 to 1989 for the Oakland Athletics, Milwaukee Brewers, and New York Yankees. Most of his career-best totals were set in 1987 while playing for the Brewers.

Steve's brother is former major league pitcher Mark Kiefer.
