= Luis Polonia =

Dominican baseball player (born 1963)

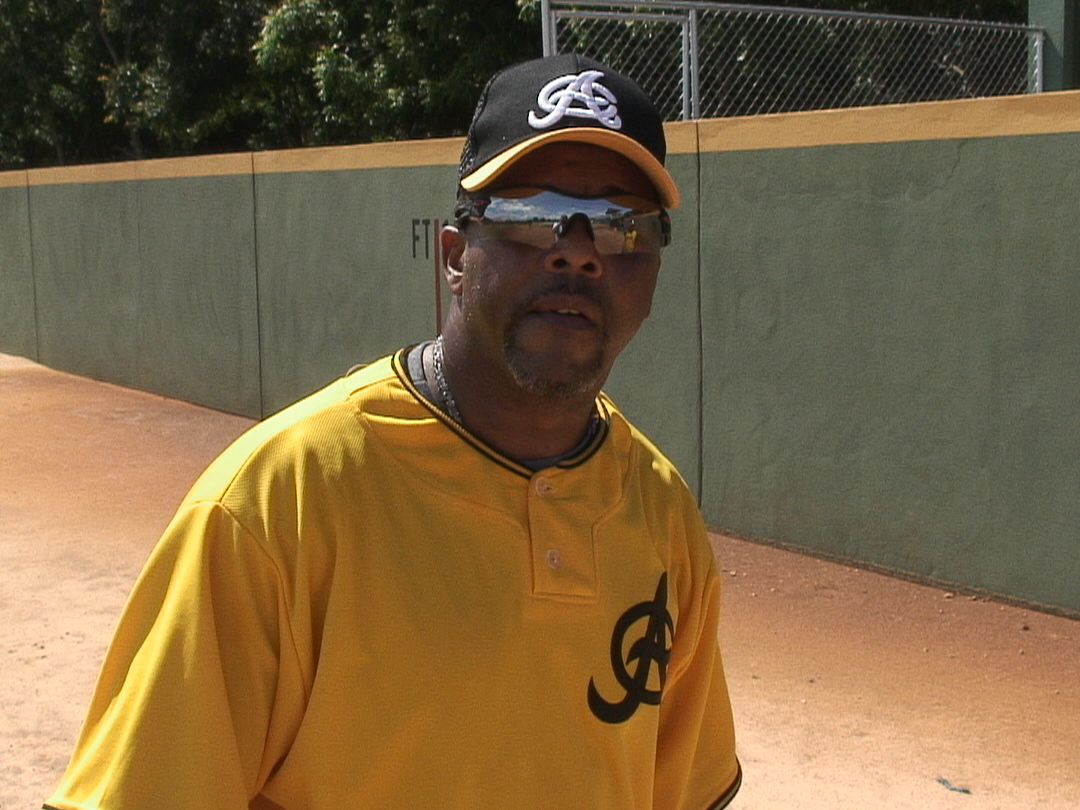
- Left fielder
- Born: December 10, 1963 (age 62); Santiago, Dominican Republic
- Batted: Left Threw: Left

MLB debut
- April 24, 1987, for the Oakland Athletics

Last MLB appearance
- October 1, 2000, for the New York Yankees

MLB statistics
- Batting average: .293
- Home runs: 36
- Runs batted in: 405
- Stolen bases: 321
- Stats at Baseball Reference

Teams
- Oakland Athletics (1987–1989); New York Yankees (1989–1990); California Angels (1990–1993); New York Yankees (1994–1995); Atlanta Braves (1995); Baltimore Orioles (1996); Atlanta Braves (1996); Detroit Tigers (1999–2000); New York Yankees (2000)

Career highlights and awards
- 2× World Series champion (1995, 2000)

Member of the Caribbean

Baseball Hall of Fame
- Induction: 2016

Luis Andrew Polonia Almonte (born December 10, 1963) is a Dominican former professional baseball outfielder and designated hitter. He played in Major League Baseball (MLB) for the Oakland Athletics, New York Yankees, California Angels, Atlanta Braves, Baltimore Orioles, and Detroit Tigers.

Signed by the Athletics as an amateur free agent in 1984, Polonia made his MLB debut on April 24, 1987. He played for two World Series championship teams, winning with the Atlanta Braves in 1995 and the New York Yankees in 2000. He appeared in his final regular season game on October 1, 2000, though he appeared in the postseason that year, including the World Series victory.

== Early life ==
Polonia was born on December 10, 1963, in the Dominican Republic. He joined the Dominican League at an early age and was known as a strong contact hitter, as well as a below-average defensive outfielder. Though he had good speed, he was not a wise baserunner and led his league in caught stealing a total of five times between the minors and majors. He was also known for his tremendous performance during winter ball. He is one of the top 10 contact hitters in Dominican League history and is the all-time Caribbean series leader in hits, doubles, and runs scored as of 2008.

== Career ==
Throughout his career, Polonia was known as a quick runner and stolen base threat.

=== Oakland Athletics (1987–1989) ===
Polonia began his career in 1987 with the Oakland Athletics. He played in 125 games that year hitting .287 with 10 triples and 29 stolen bases. The following year, Polonia played in only 84 games, hitting .292 with 29 steals in 36 attempts. Polonia's strong play helped the Oakland A's reach the postseason and advance to the World Series in 1988. However, Polonia was 1 for 9 in the series as Oakland lost to the Los Angeles Dodgers. In 1989, he was hitting .286 with 13 steals in 17 attempts before being traded to the Yankees.

=== New York Yankees (1989–1990) ===
On June 21, 1989, the Athletics traded Polonia, Eric Plunk, and Greg Cadaret to the New York Yankees for Rickey Henderson. During the remainder of the season, he hit .313 with 9 steals. In October, he was sentenced to 60 days in prison after pleading guilty to having sex with a minor that August.

Polonia began the 1990 season with seven hits in his first 22 at-bats. After only 11 games, he was traded to the California Angels for Claudell Washington and Rich Monteleone.

=== California Angels (1990–1993) ===
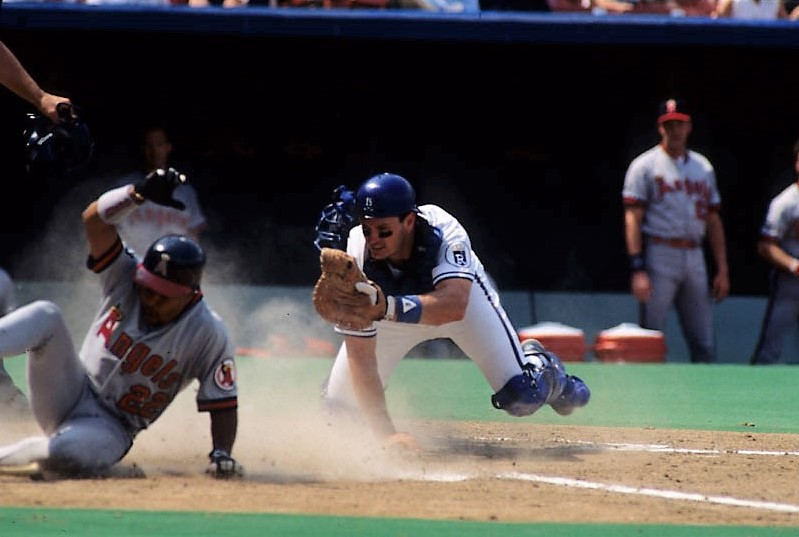
Polonia (left) scoring a run for the Angels in a 1992 game at Kauffman Stadium

Polonia finished the 1990 season with 128 hits in 381 at-bats. Polonia hit .336 for the Angels in 1991, while attaining a career-high 122 OPS+ as well as tying Nelson Liriano and Lance Johnson for third place with nine triples in the American League, but also led the league in times caught stealing. The following year, his average fell to .286, but he tied Shane Mack for the eighth place in the American League in triples. He had 48 stolen bases but was caught 23 times, leading the league. In 1993, his average fell to .271, but he stole 55 bases, tying Roberto Alomar for second (behind Kenny Lofton), but tied Chad Curtis for the league lead with 24 times caught stealing.

=== Return to the Yankees (1994–1995) and the World Series with Atlanta ===
In 1994, he signed as a free agent with the Yankees, hitting .311 in the strike-shortened season. He stole 20 of 32 bases that year, but tied Kenny Lofton and Felix Jose with 12 times caught stealing. When baseball resumed in 1995, he hit .261 before being traded to the Atlanta Braves and provided a boost down the stretch when he was 2 for 5 with 3 RBIs in the NLDS and NLCS, despite playing in a platoon role. In the first game of the 1995 World Series, Polonia drove in Fred McGriff for the game-winning RBI. Overall, he was 4-for-14 with a walk, a double, 3 runs scored, and 4 RBIs as he earned his first World Series ring.

=== Struggles (1996) ===
Prior to the season, the Seattle Mariners signed Polonia to a non-guaranteed contract. He was released during spring training. He was soon picked up by the Baltimore Orioles where he played 14 games for the Rochester Red Wings before being called up and hitting .240 over 58 games. He was cut in August and signed with the Braves, where he hit .419 down the stretch, but went 0 for 10 with just one walk that postseason as the Braves fell to the New York Yankees in six games.

=== Out of MLB ===
In 1997, he signed with the Tampa Bay Devil Rays, but instead played for the Mexico City Tigres. He led the Mexican League in steals and was second in average. Playing in winter ball that year, he hit .382 with a league-leading 15 doubles and 60 hits. In 1998, he hit .381 with 36 of 45 steals and 82 RBIs. In winter ball, he won the batting title with a .336 average, ahead of Luis Castillo.

=== Back in the Majors (1999–2000) ===
Polonia was signed late in the 1999 season by the Detroit Tigers, hitting .324 and slugging 10 home runs in 87 games. In 2000, Polonia hit .273 in 80 games for the Tigers before being released.

=== Third stint with the Yankees (2000) ===
On August 3, 2000, Polonia signed with the Yankees after being released by the Detroit Tigers. He served as an outfielder down the stretch while also receiving some time as a designated hitter. In the 2000 American League Division Series, Polonia served as a pinch hitter for Jorge Posada in Game 4, where he recorded a single. He received two at-bats in the 2000 World Series, going 1 for 2 with a single. He retired after the World Series.

=== Career statistics ===
In 1,379 games over 12 seasons, Polonia compiled a .293 batting average, 1,417 hits, 728 runs scored, 189 doubles, 70 triples, 36 home runs, 405 RBIs, 321 stolen bases, 369 base on balls, a .342 on-base percentage and a .383 slugging percentage. He posted a .983 fielding percentage at all three outfield positions. In the postseason, he hit .234 (11-for-47) in 17 World Series games and 16 playoff games.

For long a member of Águilas Cibaeñas, Polonia is the all-time leader in hits of the Dominican Professional Baseball League, with 927.

== Conviction ==
Luis Polonia was found guilty of having sexual intercourse with an underage girl, however the judge postponed sentencing until after the 1989 baseball season. "I made a mistake and I'm really sorry for it," Polonia told the judge before the sentence was imposed. "I'm a human being and anybody can make the mistake I made." Polonia, still with the New York Yankees, was sentenced to 60 days in jail and fined $1,500 on the misdemeanor charge of having sex with a 15-year-old girl. Thomas Doherty, Milwaukee County circuit judge, also ordered Polonia to make a $10,000 contribution to the Sinai Samaritan Medical Center's sexual assault treatment center in Milwaukee. Polonia pleaded no contest to the charge of having sexual intercourse with a child. The Yankees ownership made no comment; however, manager Dallas Green said, "It's a shame to see that happen. It's a personal thing. All you can do is warn people. You can't live their lives."

== Post-baseball career ==
In 2016, Polonia was inducted in the Caribbean Baseball Hall of Fame.

On May 8, 2020, Polonia's son, former professional baseball player Rodney Polonia, was found dead of an apparent heart attack, aged 27.

== See also ==
- List of Major League Baseball career stolen bases leaders
