= Eric Plunk =

American baseball player (born 1963)

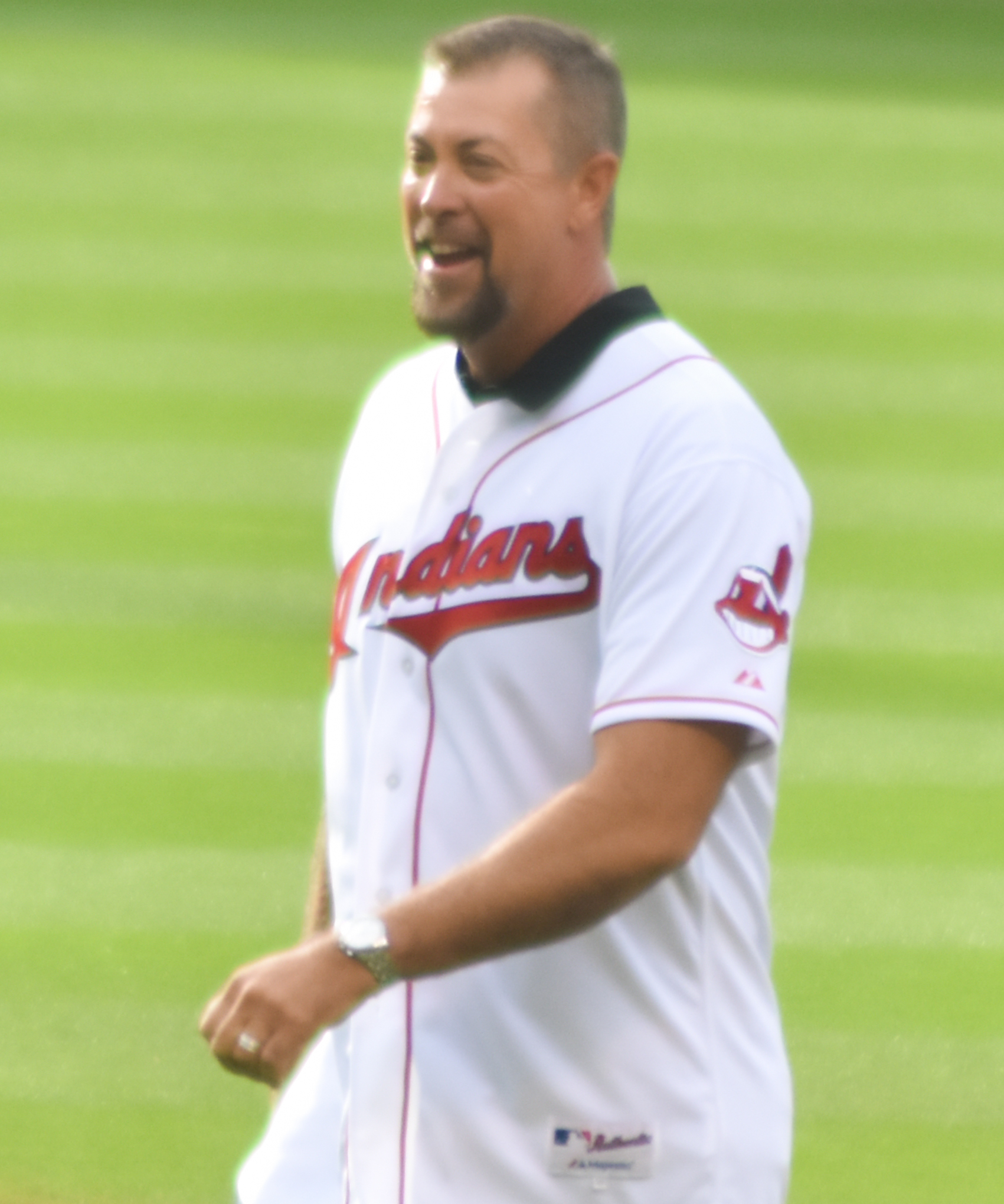
- Plunk at Progressive Field in 2015
- Pitcher
- Born: September 3, 1963 (age 62); Wilmington, California, U.S.
- Batted: Right Threw: Right

MLB debut
- May 12, 1986, for the Oakland Athletics

Last MLB appearance
- October 2, 1999, for the Milwaukee Brewers

MLB statistics
- Win–loss record: 72–58
- Earned run average: 3.82
- Strikeouts: 1,081
- Stats at Baseball Reference

Teams
- Oakland Athletics (1986–1989); New York Yankees (1989–1991); Cleveland Indians (1992–1998); Milwaukee Brewers (1998–1999)

Eric Vaughn Plunk (born September 3, 1963) is an American professional baseball pitcher who played in Major League Baseball from 1986 through 1999. He pitched for the Oakland Athletics, New York Yankees, Cleveland Indians, and Milwaukee Brewers.

== Career ==
The New York Yankees selected Plunk in the fourth round of the 1981 MLB draft. On December 5, 1984, the Yankees traded Plunk with Tim Birtsas, Jay Howell, Stan Javier, and José Rijo to the Oakland Athletics for Rickey Henderson, Bert Bradley, and cash. On June 21, 1989, he was traded by the Oakland Athletics with Greg Cadaret and Luis Polonia to the Yankees for Henderson.

Plunk signed with the Cleveland Indians as a free agent after the 1991 season. He was the winning pitcher in the first ever game played at Jacobs Field, on April 4, 1994. Plunk became one of the most reliable set-up men in baseball, posting a sub-3.00 earned run average in four consecutive seasons from 1993 to 1996. On September 17, 1996, Plunk pitched the final three innings and got the save in the Indians' 9-4 win over the White Sox that clinched Cleveland's second consecutive Central Division title.

Plunk's regular season success never translated over to the postseason. In 15 playoff appearances with the Athletics and Indians, Plunk had a 7.53 ERA and walked 10 batters in 14 innings of work. He was the losing pitcher for Game 3 of the 1997 World Series, his final postseason appearance.

Days before the trade deadline during the 1998 season, the Indians traded Plunk to the Milwaukee Brewers for Doug Jones. Plunk pitched one more season in the major leagues for the Brewers in 1999.
