= 1991 Toronto Blue Jays season =

1991 Toronto Blue Jays
- American League East champions
- League: American League
- Division: East
- Ballpark: SkyDome
- City: Toronto
- Record: 91–71 (.562)
- Divisional place: 1st
- Owners: Labatt Breweries, Imperial Trust, Canadian Imperial Bank of Commerce, Paul Beeston (CEO)
- General manager: Pat Gillick
- Manager: Cito Gaston, Gene Tenace
- Television: CFTO-TV (Don Chevrier, Tommy Hutton, Fergie Olver); The Sports Network (Jim Hughson, Buck Martinez)
- Radio: CJCL (AM) (Jerry Howarth, Tom Cheek)

The 1991 Toronto Blue Jays season was the franchise's 15th season of Major League Baseball. It resulted in the Blue Jays finishing first in the American League East with a record of 91 wins and 71 losses. The team's paid attendance of 4,001,527 led the major leagues, as the Blue Jays became the first team in MLB history to draw four million fans in a season. The Blue Jays hosted the All-Star Game on July 9.

Toronto lost the ALCS to the eventual World Series champion Minnesota Twins in five games.

== Offseason ==
On December 4, 1990, the San Diego Padres and Blue Jays made one of the biggest blockbuster deals of the decade. The Padres traded second baseman Roberto Alomar and outfielder Joe Carter to the Blue Jays in exchange for first baseman Fred McGriff and shortstop Tony Fernández. Blue Jays GM Pat Gillick and Padres GM Joe McIlvaine originally talked about just trading Joe Carter for Fred McGriff. The Padres were losing Jack Clark and needed a new first baseman. The Blue Jays had John Olerud ready to take over at first base but were losing outfielder George Bell. Gillick decided to up the ante by trying to get Alomar. Gillick figured that with Garry Templeton in the twilight of his career, Fernández would be an adequate replacement. Alomar feuded with Padres manager Greg Riddoch and the thinking was that Bip Roberts and Joey Cora could platoon at second base. Over the next two seasons, Alomar and Carter would help the Blue Jays win the 1992 and 1993 World Series.

=== Transactions ===
Transactions by the Toronto Blue Jays during the off-season before the 1991 season.

==== October 1990 ====
October 15	José Escobar granted free agency. Webster Garrison granted free agency. Tom Gilles granted free agency.
October 24	Released Jim Eppard.
October 26	Released Rick Luecken.

==== November 1990 ====
November 5	George Bell granted free agency (signed with Chicago Cubs on December 6, 1990, to a three-year, $9.8 million contract). Bud Black granted free agency (signed with San Francisco Giants on November 9, 1990, to a four-year, $10 million contract). John Candelaria granted free agency (signed with Los Angeles Dodgers on March 25, 1991, to a one-year, $830,000 contract). Rance Mulliniks granted free agency (signed with Toronto Blue Jays to a two-year, $1.5 million contract on December 4, 1990).
November 6	Acquired Alex Sanchez from the Cleveland Indians for Willie Blair.
November 26	Signed free agent Ken Dayley from the St. Louis Cardinals to a three-year, $6.3 million contract.

==== December 1990 ====
December 2	Acquired Willie Fraser, Marcus Moore and Devon White from the California Angels for Junior Félix, Luis Sojo and a player to be named later (Ken Rivers on December 4, 1990).
December 4	Signed free agent Ravelo Manzanillo from the Chicago White Sox to a one-year contract. Re-signed free agent Rance Mulliniks to a two-year, $1.5 million contract.
December 5	Signed free agent Pat Tabler from the Kansas City Royals to a two-year, $1.6 million contract. Acquired Roberto Alomar and Joe Carter from the San Diego Padres for Tony Fernández and Fred McGriff.
December 10	Signed amateur free agent Carlos Almanzar to a contract. Signed amateur free agent Edwin Hurtado to a contract. Signed free agent Dilson Torres to a contract.
December 14	Acquired Mickey Weston from the Baltimore Orioles for Paul Kilgus.
December 20	John Cerutti granted free agency (signed with Detroit Tigers to a one-year, $800,000 on January 14, 1991).

==== January 1991 ====
January 15	Acquired Rene Gonzales from the Baltimore Orioles for Rob Blumberg.

==== February 1991 ====
February 8	Re-signed Roberto Alomar to a one-year, $1.25 million contract.

== Regular season ==
- May 1, 1991: The Blue Jays were part of baseball history, as Nolan Ryan threw his seventh and last no-hitter against them in Arlington.
- July 1, 1991: Joe Carter was named the AL Player of the Month for the month of June.
- August 13, 1991: After making 25 consecutive save opportunities, Tom Henke picked up a blown save after Paul Molitor hit a home run in the ninth.
- October 2, 1991: The Blue Jays clinched the American League East title in a 6-5 walk-off win over the California Angels. Joe Carter hit the game-winning single. The Jays also became the first team to have their season attendance pass the 4 million mark.

=== Opening Day starters ===
- Roberto Alomar
- Joe Carter
- Kelly Gruber
- Manuel Lee
- Rance Mulliniks
- Greg Myers
- John Olerud
- Dave Stieb
- Devon White
- Mookie Wilson

=== Season standings ===
AL East
Team	W	L	Pct.	GB	Home	Road
Toronto Blue Jays	91	71	.562	—	46‍–‍35	45‍–‍36
Boston Red Sox	84	78	.519	7	43‍–‍38	41‍–‍40
Detroit Tigers	84	78	.519	7	49‍–‍32	35‍–‍46
Milwaukee Brewers	83	79	.512	8	43‍–‍37	40‍–‍42
New York Yankees	71	91	.438	20	39‍–‍42	32‍–‍49
Baltimore Orioles	67	95	.414	24	33‍–‍48	34‍–‍47
Cleveland Indians	57	105	.352	34	30‍–‍52	27‍–‍53

=== Record vs. opponents ===
1991 American League record Sources:
Team	BAL	BOS	CAL	CWS	CLE	DET	KC	MIL	MIN	NYY	OAK	SEA	TEX	TOR
Baltimore	—	8–5	6–6	4–8	7–6	5–8	4–8	3–10	4–8	5–8	3–9	4–8	9–3	5–8
Boston	5–8	—	4–8	7–5	9–4	5–8	7–5	7–6	3–9	6–7	8–4	9–3	5–7	9–4
California	6–6	8–4	—	8–5	7–5	5–7	9–4	6–6	8–5	6–6	1–12	6–7	5–8	6–6
Chicago	8–4	5–7	5–8	—	6–6	4–8	7–6	7–5	8–5	8–4	7–6	7–6	8–5	7–5
Cleveland	6–7	4–9	5–7	6–6	—	7–6	4–8	5–8	2–10	6–7	5–7	2–10	4–8	1–12
Detroit	8–5	8–5	7–5	8–4	6–7	—	8–4	4–9	4–8	8–5	4–8	8–4	6–6	5–8
Kansas City	8–4	5–7	4–9	6–7	8–4	4–8	—	9–3	6–7	7–5	6–7	7–6	7–6	5–7
Milwaukee	10–3	6–7	6–6	5–7	8–5	9–4	3–9	—	6–6	6–7	8–4	3–9	7–5	6–7
Minnesota	8–4	9–3	5–8	5–8	10–2	8–4	7–6	6–6	—	10–2	8–5	9–4	6–7	4–8
New York	8–5	7–6	6–6	4–8	7–6	5–8	5–7	7–6	2–10	—	6–6	3–9	5–7	6–7
Oakland	9–3	4–8	12–1	6–7	7–5	8–4	7–6	4–8	5–8	6–6	—	6–7	4–9	6–6
Seattle	8–4	3–9	7–6	6–7	10–2	4–8	6–7	9–3	4–9	9–3	7–6	—	5–8	5–7
Texas	3–9	7–5	8–5	5–8	8–4	6–6	6–7	5–7	7–6	7–5	9–4	8–5	—	6–6
Toronto	8–5	4–9	6–6	5–7	12–1	8–5	7–5	7–6	8–4	7–6	6–6	7–5	6–6	—

=== Transactions ===
Transactions for the Toronto Blue Jays during the 1991 regular season.

==== May 1991 ====
May 16	Signed amateur free agent Freddy García to a contract. Signed amateur free agent Julio Mosquera to a contract.

==== June 1991 ====
June 4	Kenny Williams selected off of waivers by the Montreal Expos.
June 26	Willie Fraser selected off of waivers by the St. Louis Cardinals.
June 27	Acquired Tom Candiotti and Turner Ward from the Cleveland Indians for Denis Boucher, Glenallen Hill, Mark Whiten and cash.

==== July 1991 ====
July 3	Selected Efraín Valdez off of waivers from the Cleveland Indians.
July 14	Acquired Cory Snyder from the Chicago White Sox for Shawn Jeter and a player to be named later (Steve Wapnick on September 4, 1991).

==== August 1991 ====
August 9	Acquired Candy Maldonado from the Milwaukee Brewers for Bob Wishnevski and a player to be named later (William Suero on August 14, 1991).

==== September 1991 ====
September 14	Signed free agent Dave Parker from the California Angels to a contract.

=== 1991 MLB draft ===
- June 3, 1991: 1991 Major League Baseball draft
  - Shawn Green was drafted by the Blue Jays in the 1st round (16th pick). Player signed September 25, 1991.
  - Jeff Ware was drafted by the Blue Jays in the 1st round (35th pick). Player signed August 25, 1991.
  - Dante Powell was drafted by the Blue Jays in the 1st round (42nd pick), but did not sign.
  - Chris Stynes was drafted by the Blue Jays in the 3rd round. Player signed June 4, 1991.
  - Alex Gonzalez was drafted by the Blue Jays in the 14th round. Player signed June 12, 1991.

=== Roster ===
1991 Toronto Blue Jays
Roster
Pitchers: 34 Jim Acker; 35 Denis Boucher; 49 Tom Candiotti; 46 Ken Dayley; 26 Vince Horsman; 27 Willie Fraser; 66 Juan Guzmán; 50 Tom Henke; 41 Pat Hentgen; 22 Jimmy Key; 28 Al Leiter; 45 Bob MacDonald; 37 Dave Stieb; 30 Todd Stottlemyre; 40 Mike Timlin; 31 Duane Ward; 53 David Weathers; 36 David Wells; 26 Mickey Weston; 44 Frank Wills	Catchers: 10 Pat Borders; 54 Randy Knorr; 21 Greg Myers; Infielders: 12 Roberto Alomar; 19 Ray Giannelli; 88 Rene Gonzales; 17 Kelly Gruber; 4 Manuel Lee; 5 Rance Mulliniks; 9 John Olerud; 33 Ed Sprague; 15 Pat Tabler; 1 Eddie Zosky	Outfielders: 14 Derek Bell; 29 Joe Carter; 20 Rob Ducey; 24 Glenallen Hill; 23 Candy Maldonado; 27 Cory Snyder; 24 Turner Ward; 25 Devon White; 23 Mark Whiten; 13 Kenny Williams; 3 Mookie Wilson; Other batters: 39 Dave Parker	Manager: 43 Cito Gaston; Coaches: 42 Galen Cisco (pitching); 7 Rich Hacker (third base); 6 Mike Squires (first base); 8 John Sullivan (bullpen); 18 Gene Tenace (hitting); 56 Héctor Torres (bench)

Manager Cito Gaston was sidelined with a herniated disc from August 21 to September 25. Gene Tenace served as the team's interim manager, going 19–14 and keeping the Jays in first place in the AL East for the duration of Gaston's absence.

=== Game log ===
1991 Game Log
April: 12–9 (Home: 8–3; Away: 4–6)

#	Date	Opponent	Score	Win	Loss	Save	Attendance	Record
1	April 8	Red Sox	2–6	Clemens (1–0)	Stieb (0–1)		50,114	0–1
2	April 9	Red Sox	4–3	Key (1–0)	Harris (0–1)	Henke (1)	42,211	1–1
3	April 10	Red Sox	5–3	Timlin (1–0)	Gray (0–1)	Henke (2)	41,164	2–1
4	April 11	Brewers	7–3	Wells (1–0)	Robinson (0–1)		38,326	3–1
5	April 12	Brewers	5–4 (11)	Timlin (2–0)	Plesac (0–1)		43,150	4–1
6	April 13	Brewers	3–7	Brown (1–0)	Stieb (0–2)	Crim (1)	49,872	4–2
7	April 14	Brewers	9–0	Key (2–0)	August (0–1)		47,136	5–2
8	April 15	@ Tigers	4–3	Stottlemyre (1–0)	Terrell (0–2)	Ward (1)	9,632	6–2
9	April 16	@ Tigers	2–6	Gullickson (1–0)	Wells (1–1)	Henneman (2)	10,791	6–3
10	April 17	@ Tigers	4–5 (10)	Henneman (1–0)	Ward (0–1)		16,355	6–4
11	April 19	@ Brewers	5–2	Stieb (1–2)	August (0–2)		9,604	7–4
12	April 20	@ Brewers	4–2	Key (3–0)	Bosio (1–2)	Ward (2)	13,545	8–4
13	April 21	@ Brewers	8–11 (10)	Crim (1–0)	Wills (0–1)		14,920	8–5
14	April 22	@ Red Sox	4–6	Lamp (1–1)	Wells (1–2)	Reardon (4)	25,841	8–6
15	April 23	@ Red Sox	0–3	Clemens (4–0)	Boucher (0–1)	Reardon (5)	29,904	8–7
16	April 24	@ Red Sox	6–1	Stieb (2–2)	Young (0–1)		28,841	9–7
17	April 25	Tigers	3–2	Key (4–0)	Petry (0–1)	Ward (3)	49,688	10–7
18	April 26	Tigers	5–4	Stottlemyre (2–0)	Terrell (0–3)	Ward (4)	50,170	11–7
19	April 27	Tigers	2–4	Gullickson (2–0)	Wells (1–3)	Henneman (3)	50,211	11–8
20	April 28	Tigers	9–6	Timlin (3–0)	Leiter (0–1)	Ward (5)	50,134	12–8
21	April 30	@ Rangers	5–8	Gossage (2–0)	Acker (0–1)	Russell (5)	24,873	12–9

May: 15–12 (Home: 8–5; Away: 7–7)

#	Date	Opponent	Score	Win	Loss	Save	Attendance	Record
22	May 1	@ Rangers	0–3	Ryan (3–2)	Key (4–1)		33,439	12–10
23	May 2	@ Royals	3–1	Stottlemyre (3–0)	Appier (1–4)	Ward (6)	22,896	13–10
24	May 3	@ Royals	5–1	Wells (2–3)	Davis (2–2)		20,809	14–10
25	May 4	@ Royals	5–6	Saberhagen (2–3)	Boucher (0–2)	Montgomery (6)	22,628	14–11
26	May 5	@ Royals	3–0	Stieb (3–2)	Gordon (1–2)	Ward (7)	22,588	15–11
27	May 7	Rangers	2–3	Rogers (1–3)	Key (4–2)	Russell (6)	44,622	15–12
28	May 8	Rangers	4–2	Stottlemyre (4–0)	Ryan (3–3)	Ward (8)	43,211	16–12
29	May 9	White Sox	2–0	Wells (3–3)	Pérez (1–2)	Ward (9)	47,236	17–12
30	May 10	White Sox	3–5 (12)	Radinsky (2–1)	Fraser (0–1)		50,198	17–13
31	May 11	White Sox	5–2	Stieb (4–2)	Hough (0–2)	Ward (10)	50,206	18–13
32	May 12	White Sox	4–2	Key (5–2)	Hibbard (2–1)	Ward (11)	50,108	19–13
33	May 13	Royals	4–2	Stottlemyre (5–0)	Davis (2–4)	Ward (12)	44,275	20–13
34	May 14	Royals	4–1	Wells (4–3)	Gubicza (0–1)	Timlin (1)	43,357	21–13
35	May 15	Royals	4–6	Saberhagen (4–3)	Boucher (0–3)		50,113	21–14
36	May 17	@ White Sox	3–5	Pall (1–1)	Timlin (3–1)	Thigpen (7)	30,095	21–15
37	May 18	@ White Sox	9–2	Key (6–2)	Hibbard (2–2)		34,861	22–15
38	May 19	@ White Sox	4–5	Patterson (1–0)	Timlin (3–2)	Thigpen (8)	41,015	22–16
39	May 20	@ Athletics	1–0	Wells (5–3)	Welch (4–3)	Henke (3)	24,631	23–16
40	May 21	@ Athletics	11–7	Acker (1–1)	Dressendorfer (3–3)	Timlin (2)	22,738	24–16
41	May 22	@ Athletics	1–2	Moore (6–2)	Stieb (4–3)	Eckersley (11)	34,028	24–17
42	May 24	@ Angels	3–2	Timlin (4–2)	Finley (7–2)	Henke (4)	26,408	25–17
43	May 25	@ Angels	0–5	McCaskill (4–5)	Stottlemyre (5–1)		36,732	25–18
44	May 26	@ Angels	2–6	Langston (6–1)	Wells (5–4)		45,307	25–19
45	May 28	Athletics	4–8	Moore (7–2)	Acker (1–2)	Eckersley (12)	50,299	25–20
46	May 29	Athletics	8–3	Key (7–2)	Slusarski (1–2)	Henke (5)	50,262	26–20
47	May 30	Athletics	6–8	Klink (4–2)	Ward (0–2)	Eckersley (13)	50,271	26–21
48	May 31	Angels	5–1	Wells (6–4)	Langston (6–2)		50,252	27–21

June: 16–12 (Home: 8–7; Away: 8–5)

#	Date	Opponent	Score	Win	Loss	Save	Attendance	Record
49	June 1	Angels	8–11	Eichhorn (1–1)	Fraser (0–2)	Harvey (13)	50,255	27–22
50	June 2	Angels	2–7	Abbott (5–4)	Acker (1–3)		50,261	27–23
51	June 3	@ Yankees	5–3	Key (8–2)	Leary (3–5)	Henke (6)	17,003	28–23
52	June 4	@ Yankees	3–5	Sanderson (7–2)	Stottlemyre (5–2)	Farr (4)	15,955	28–24
53	June 5	@ Yankees	4–1	Wells (7–4)	Johnson (0–1)	Henke (7)	21,213	29–24
54	June 6	@ Orioles	4–6	Milacki (2–2)	Timlin (4–3)	Olson (9)	26,539	29–25
55	June 7	@ Orioles	4–6	Smith (3–0)	Guzmán (0–1)	Olson (10)	38,228	29–26
56	June 8	@ Orioles	8–4	Key (9–2)	Kilgus (0–1)		45,569	30–26
57	June 9	@ Orioles	3–2	Stottlemyre (6–2)	Ballard (3–7)	Henke (8)	27,783	31–26
58	June 11	@ Indians	1–2 (12)	Hillegas (2–0)	Acker (1–4)		10,753	31–27
59	June 12	@ Indians	1–0	Timlin (5–3)	Candiotti (7–4)	Henke (9)	8,089	32–27
60	June 13	@ Indians	1–0	Key (10–2)	Nagy (2–7)		8,371	33–27
61	June 14	Orioles	9–1	Stottlemyre (7–2)	Robinson (3–6)		50,287	34–27
62	June 15	Orioles	4–8	Ballard (4–7)	Guzmán (0–2)	Williamson (3)	50,292	34–28
63	June 16	Orioles	8–13	Frohwirth (1–0)	Ward (0–3)		50,273	34–29
64	June 18	Yankees	2–4	Kamieniecki (1–0)	Timlin (5–4)	Farr (7)	50,271	34–30
65	June 19	Yankees	0–3	Johnson (1–2)	Key (10–3)	Howe (1)	50,281	34–31
66	June 20	Yankees	6–1	Stottlemyre (8–2)	Leary (3–7)		50,256	35–31
67	June 21	Indians	8–4	Wells (8–4)	Swindell (3–6)	Henke (10)	50,283	36–31
68	June 22	Indians	4–0	Guzmán (1–2)	Mutis (0–2)	Ward (13)	50,285	37–31
69	June 23	Indians	3–1	MacDonald (1–0)	Candiotti (7–6)	Henke (11)	50,275	38–31
70	June 24	Indians	4–3	Ward (1–3)	Nagy (3–8)	Henke (12)	50,263	39–31
71	June 25	@ Twins	6–8	Morris (10–5)	Stottlemyre (8–3)	Aguilera (20)	26,350	39–32
72	June 26	@ Twins	5–2	Wells (9–4)	Guthrie (5–4)	Henke (13)	25,503	40–32
73	June 27	@ Twins	1–0	Guzmán (2–2)	Tapani (5–7)	Henke (14)	35,598	41–32
74	June 28	Mariners	1–3	Krueger (5–3)	Candiotti (7–7)	Jackson (13)	50,297	41–33
75	June 29	Mariners	4–0	Timlin (6–4)	DeLucia (6–5)	Ward (14)	50,268	42–33
76	June 30	Mariners	6–1	Stottlemyre (9–3)	Holman (7–8)		50,298	43–33

July: 15–11 (Home: 8–6; Away: 7–5)

#	Date	Opponent	Score	Win	Loss	Save	Attendance	Record
77	July 1	Mariners	4–3	Acker (2–4)	Jackson (4–3)		50,270	44–33
78	July 2	Twins	4–3	Ward (2–3)	Leach (0–1)		48,676	45–33
79	July 3	Twins	4–0	Candiotti (8–7)	Anderson (4–7)		50,071	46–33
80	July 4	Twins	0–1	West (1–0)	Key (10–4)	Aguilera (21)	50,293	46–34
81	July 5	@ Mariners	2–1	MacDonald (2–0)	Holman (7–9)	Henke (15)	21,647	47–34
82	July 6	@ Mariners	4–3 (10)	Timlin (7–4)	Swan (3–2)	Henke (16)	48,750	48–34
83	July 7	@ Mariners	5–2	Guzmán (3–2)	Hanson (4–4)		27,812	49–34
84	July 11	Rangers	2–0	Candiotti (9–7)	Brown (7–7)	Henke (17)	50,276	50–34
85	July 12	Rangers	6–2	Wells (10–4)	Guzmán (4–4)	Ward (15)	50,279	51–34
86	July 13	Rangers	3–2	Timlin (8–4)	Russell (3–2)	Henke (18)	50,270	52–34
87	July 14	Rangers	6–8	Barfield (4–3)	Key (10–5)	Russell (18)	50,294	52–35
88	July 15	@ Royals	5–3 (12)	Timlin (9–4)	Crawford (2–1)	Henke (19)	29,723	53–35
89	July 16	@ Royals	1–2 (10)	Aquino (2–2)	Candiotti (9–8)		22,134	53–36
90	July 18	@ Rangers	4–0	Wells (11–4)	Ryan (5–5)	Ward (16)	37,268	54–36
91	July 19	@ Rangers	7–2	Stottlemyre (10–3)	Barfield (4–4)	Timlin (3)	35,144	55–36
92	July 20	@ Rangers	6–11	Jeffcoat (4–2)	Key (10–6)		39,276	55–37
93	July 21	@ Rangers	5–6	Rogers (6–7)	Timlin (9–5)	Russell (19)	31,803	55–38
94	July 23	@ White Sox	2–3	Thigpen (7–3)	Candiotti (9–9)		34,779	55–39
95	July 24	@ White Sox	2–1	Wells (12–4)	McDowell (12–5)	Henke (20)	39,599	56–39
96	July 25	@ White Sox	1–7	Hough (6–6)	Stottlemyre (10–4)		42,796	56–40
97	July 26	Royals	6–5 (11)	Ward (3–3)	Gordon (5–9)		50,326	57–40
98	July 27	Royals	2–5 (10)	Gordon (6–9)	Timlin (9–6)	Montgomery (19)	50,291	57–41
99	July 28	Royals	4–10	Gubicza (6–5)	Candiotti (9–10)	Davis (2)	50,291	57–42
100	July 29	White Sox	4–12	McDowell (13–5)	Wells (12–5)		50,298	57–43
101	July 30	White Sox	7–8	Radinsky (3–3)	MacDonald (2–1)	Thigpen (24)	50,291	57–44
102	July 31	Indians	3–1	Key (11–6)	King (4–6)	Henke (21)	50,276	58–44

August: 15–14 (Home: 6–8; Away: 9–6)

#	Date	Opponent	Score	Win	Loss	Save	Attendance	Record
103	August 1	Indians	7–5	Ward (4–3)	Shaw (0–4)	Henke (22)	50,275	59–44
104	August 2	@ Red Sox	3–5	Clemens (12–7)	Candiotti (9–11)		34,032	59–45
105	August 3	@ Red Sox	1–4	Hesketh (5–2)	Wells (12–6)	Reardon (25)	34,015	59–46
106	August 4	@ Red Sox	2–1	Ward (5–3)	Lamp (3–3)	Henke (23)	33,809	60–46
107	August 6	Tigers	2–1	Key (12–6)	Cerutti (1–4)	Henke (24)	50,305	61–46
108	August 7	Tigers	5–2	Guzmán (4–2)	Tanana (8–8)	Henke (25)	50,324	62–46
109	August 8	Tigers	0–4 (14)	Gibson (5–5)	Henke (0–1)		50,307	62–47
110	August 9	Red Sox	7–12	Hesketh (6–2)	Wells (12–7)	Reardon (26)	50,319	62–48
111	August 10	Red Sox	1–7	Harris (8–11)	Stottlemyre (10–5)		50,304	62–49
112	August 11	Red Sox	6–9	Gardiner (4–6)	Key (12–7)	Reardon (27)	50,297	62–50
113	August 12	Red Sox	8–11	Lamp (4–3)	Ward (5–4)	Reardon (28)	50,305	62–51
114	August 13	@ Brewers	4–5	Crim (7–5)	Henke (0–2)		22,996	62–52
115	August 14	@ Brewers	3–5	Bosio (9–8)	Wells (12–8)	Henry (3)	19,193	62–53
116	August 15	@ Brewers	4–1	Stottlemyre (11–5)	Plesac (1–5)	Henke (26)	24,519	63–53
117	August 16	@ Tigers	2–5	Cerutti (2–4)	Key (12–8)	Gakeler (1)	43,186	63–54
118	August 17	@ Tigers	7–5	MacDonald (3–1)	Aldred (0–2)	Henke (27)	46,634	64–54
119	August 18	@ Tigers	4–2	Candiotti (10–11)	Kaiser (0–1)	Henke (28)	48,724	65–54
120	August 20	Brewers	3–1	Stottlemyre (12–5)	Bosio (9–9)	Henke (29)	50,311	66–54
121	August 21	Brewers	0–3	Machado (1–3)	Key (12–9)	Núñez (8)	50,306	66–55
122	August 22	Brewers	7–8	Ignasiak (1–0)	Ward (5–5)	Henry (5)	50,309	66–56
123	August 23	Yankees	6–5	Ward (6–5)	Farr (3–4)		50,318	67–56
124	August 24	Yankees	5–6	Johnson (5–7)	Wells (12–9)	Cadaret (2)	50,324	67–57
125	August 25	Yankees	11–7	Acker (3–4)	Guetterman (2–2)		50,320	68–57
126	August 26	@ Orioles	5–2	Key (13–9)	Johnson (4–5)	Henke (30)	28,063	69–57
127	August 27	@ Orioles	6–1	Guzmán (5–2)	Rhodes (0–1)		25,090	70–57
128	August 28	@ Orioles	3–0	Candiotti (11–11)	McDonald (5–8)	Henke (31)	28,262	71–57
129	August 29	@ Yankees	6–2	Wells (13–9)	Johnson (5–8)		19,344	72–57
130	August 30	@ Yankees	2–9	Sanderson (14–8)	Stottlemyre (12–6)		19,393	72–58
131	August 31	@ Yankees	5–0	Key (14–9)	Cadaret (6–5)	Ward (17)	28,932	73–58

September: 14–12 (Home: 6–6; Away: 8–6)

#	Date	Opponent	Score	Win	Loss	Save	Attendance	Record
132	September 1	@ Yankees	2–4	Guetterman (3–2)	MacDonald (3–2)		25,105	73–59
133	September 2	Orioles	5–4 (12)	Timlin (12–6)	Olson (3–5)		50,314	74–59
134	September 3	Orioles	4–8	McDonald (6–8)	Wells (13–10)	Flanagan (3)	50,299	74–60
135	September 4	Orioles	3–1	Stottlemyre (13–6)	Milacki (8–8)	Ward (18)	50,303	75–60
136	September 5	@ Indians	13–1	Key (15–9)	Nagy (8–12)		5,666	76–60
137	September 6	@ Indians	7–4	Guzmán (6–2)	Otto (1–6)	Ward (19)	14,533	77–60
138	September 7	@ Indians	4–1	Candiotti (12–11)	Swindell (8–14)		17,830	78–60
139	September 8	@ Indians	11–5	Wells (14–10)	King (5–10)		13,071	79–60
140	September 10	Mariners	4–5	Holman (13–13)	Stottlemyre (13–7)	Jones (1)	50,196	79–61
141	September 11	Mariners	3–7	Hanson (8–7)	Key (15–10)		50,321	79–62
142	September 13	Athletics	7–6	Guzmán (7–2)	Stewart (11–9)	Henke (32)	50,315	80–62
143	September 14	Athletics	6–0	Candiotti (13–11)	Welch (11–12)		50,319	81–62
144	September 15	Athletics	5–10	Moore (14–8)	Stottlemyre (13–8)	Eckersley (40)	50,315	81–63
145	September 16	@ Mariners	5–6 (11)	Swan (5–2)	MacDonald (3–3)		55,612	81–64
146	September 17	@ Mariners	4–5 (11)	Schooler (2–2)	Acker (3–5)		29,115	81–65
147	September 18	@ Mariners	5–3 (12)	Ward (7–5)	Bankhead (2–6)	Acker (1)	30,200	82–65
148	September 20	@ Athletics	5–6 (11)	Eckersley (5–3)	Ward (7–6)		33,765	82–66
149	September 21	@ Athletics	0–4	Moore (15–8)	Key (15–11)		36,601	82–67
150	September 22	@ Athletics	3–2	Guzmán (8–2)	Darling (3–5)	Wells (1)	28,276	83–67
151	September 23	@ Angels	9–10	Lewis (3–5)	Candiotti (13–12)	Harvey (43)	20,001	83–68
152	September 24	@ Angels	3–0 (10)	Wells (15–10)	Abbott (17–10)		21,538	84–68
153	September 25	@ Angels	7–2	Key (16–11)	Langston (17–8)		19,251	85–68
154	September 27	Twins	7–2	Guzmán (9–2)	Tapani (16–9)		50,326	86–68
155	September 28	Twins	0–5	Morris (18–12)	Candiotti (13–13)		50,319	86–69
156	September 29	Twins	2–1	Stottlemyre (14–8)	Erickson (19–8)	Ward (20)	50,315	87–69
157	September 30	Angels	1–2	Langston (18–8)	Key (16–12)	Harvey (45)	50,321	87–70

October: 4–1 (Home: 2–0; Away: 2–1)

#	Date	Opponent	Score	Win	Loss	Save	Attendance	Record
158	October 1	Angels	5–2	Guzmán (10–2)	Fetters (2–5)	Ward (21)	50,322	88–70
159	October 2	Angels	6–5	Timlin (11–6)	Harvey (2–4)		50,324	89–70
160	October 4	@ Twins	4–1	Stottlemyre (15–8)	Neagle (0–1)	Ward (22)	35,124	90–70
161	October 5	@ Twins	1–3	Erickson (20–8)	Guzmán (10–3)	Aguilera (42)	51,058	90–71
162	October 6	@ Twins	3–2 (10)	Weathers (1–0)	Anderson (5–11)	Ward (23)	37,794	91–71

1991 Playoff Game Log
American League Championship Series: 1–4

#	Date	Opponent	Score	Win	Loss	Save	Attendance	Series
1	October 8	@ Twins	4–5	Morris (1–0)	Candiotti (0–1)	Aguilera (1)	54,766	0–1
2	October 9	@ Twins	5–2	Guzman (1–0)	Tapani (0–1)	Ward (1)	54,816	1–1
3	October 11	Twins	2–3 (10)	Guthrie (1–0)	Timlin (0–1)	Aguilera (2)	51,454	1–2
4	October 12	Twins	3–9	Morris (2–0)	Stottlemyre (0–1)		51,526	1–3
5	October 13	Twins	5–8	West (1–0)	Ward (0–1)	Aguilera (3)	51,425	1–4

== All-Star game ==
The Blue Jays hosted the 1991 Major League Baseball All-Star Game. It was the 62nd Midsummer Classic and was played on July 9 at SkyDome. Roberto Alomar was voted in as the starting second baseman for the American League, while pitcher Jimmy Key and outfielder Joe Carter were named as reserves on the AL team. Key got the win as the American League's All-Stars beat the National League All-Stars 4–2.

== Player stats ==
= Indicates team leader

=== Batting ===
==== Starters by position ====
Note: Pos = Position; G = Games played; AB = At bats; H = Hits; Avg. = Batting average; HR = Home runs; RBI = Runs batted in

Pos	Player	G	AB	H	Avg.	HR	RBI
C	Greg Myers	107	309	81	.262	8	36
1B	John Olerud	139	454	116	.256	17	68
2B	Roberto Alomar	161	637	188	.295	9	69
3B	Kelly Gruber	113	429	108	.252	20	65
SS	Manuel Lee	138	445	104	.234	0	29
LF	Candy Maldonado	52	177	49	.277	7	28
CF	Devon White	156	642	181	.282	17	60
RF	Joe Carter	162	638	174	.273	33	108
DH	Rance Mulliniks	97	240	60	.250	2	24

==== Other batters ====
Note: G = Games played; AB = At bats; H = Hits; Avg. = Batting average; HR = Home runs; RBI = Runs batted in

Player	G	AB	H	Avg.	HR	RBI
Pat Borders	105	291	71	.244	5	36
Mookie Wilson	86	241	58	.241	2	28
Pat Tabler	82	185	40	.216	1	21
Ed Sprague Jr.	61	160	44	.275	4	20
Mark Whiten	46	149	33	.221	2	19
Rene Gonzales	71	118	23	.195	1	6
Glenallen Hill	35	99	25	.253	3	11
Rob Ducey	39	68	16	.235	1	4
Cory Snyder	21	49	7	.143	0	6
Dave Parker	13	36	12	.333	0	3
Kenny Williams	13	29	6	.207	1	3
Derek Bell	18	28	4	.143	0	1
Eddie Zosky	18	27	4	.148	0	2
Ray Giannelli	9	24	4	.167	0	0
Turner Ward	8	13	4	.308	0	2
Randy Knorr	3	1	0	.000	0	0

=== Pitching ===
==== Starting pitchers ====
Note: G = Games pitched; IP = Innings pitched; W = Wins; L = Losses; ERA = Earned run average; SO = Strikeouts

Player	G	IP	W	L	ERA	SO
Todd Stottlemyre	34	219.0	15	8	3.78	116
Jimmy Key	33	209.1	16	12	3.05	125
Juan Guzmán	23	138.2	10	3	2.99	123
Tom Candiotti	19	129.2	6	7	2.98	81
Dave Stieb	9	59.2	4	3	3.17	29
Denis Boucher	7	35.1	0	3	4.58	16

==== Other pitchers ====
Note: G = Games pitched; IP = Innings pitched; W = Wins; L = Losses; ERA = Earned run average; SO = Strikeouts

Player	G	IP	W	L	ERA	SO
David Wells	40	198.1	15	10	3.72	106
Willie Fraser	13	26.1	0	2	6.15	12
Pat Hentgen	3	7.1	0	0	2.45	3

==== Relief pitchers ====
Note: G = Games pitched; W = Wins; L = Losses; SV = Saves; ERA = Earned run average; SO = Strikeouts

Player	G	W	L	SV	ERA	SO
Tom Henke	49	0	2	32	2.32	53
Duane Ward	81	7	6	23	2.77	132
Mike Timlin	63	11	6	3	3.16	85
Jim Acker	54	3	5	1	5.20	44
Bob MacDonald	45	3	3	0	2.85	24
David Weathers	15	1	0	0	4.91	13
Ken Dayley	8	0	0	0	6.23	3
Frank Wills	4	0	1	0	16.62	2
Vince Horsman	4	0	0	0	0.00	2
Al Leiter	3	0	0	0	27.00	1
Mickey Weston	2	0	0	0	0.00	1

== ALCS ==
=== Game 1 ===
October 8, Hubert H. Humphrey Metrodome

Team	1	2	3	4	5	6	7	8	9	R	H	E
Toronto	0	0	0	1	0	3	0	0	0	4	9	3
Minnesota	2	2	1	0	0	0	0	0	X	5	11	0
W: Jack Morris (1–0) L: Tom Candiotti (0–1) S: Rick Aguilera (1)
HR: None

=== Game 2 ===
October 9, Hubert H. Humphrey Metrodome

Team	1	2	3	4	5	6	7	8	9	R	H	E
Toronto	1	0	2	0	0	0	2	0	0	5	9	0
Minnesota	0	0	1	0	0	1	0	0	0	2	5	1
W: Juan Guzmán (1–0) L: Kevin Tapani (0–1) S: Duane Ward (1)
HR: None

=== Game 3 ===
October 11, Skydome

Team	1	2	3	4	5	6	7	8	9	10	R	H	E
Minnesota	0	0	0	0	1	1	0	0	0	1	3	7	0
Toronto	2	0	0	0	0	0	0	0	0	0	2	5	1
W: Mark Guthrie (1–0) L: Mike Timlin (0–1) S: Rick Aguilera (2)
HR: MIN – Mike Pagliarulo (1) TOR – Joe Carter (1)

=== Game 4 ===
October 12, Skydome

Team	1	2	3	4	5	6	7	8	9	R	H	E
Minnesota	0	0	0	4	0	2	1	1	1	9	13	1
Toronto	0	1	0	0	0	1	0	0	1	3	11	2
W: Jack Morris (2–0) L: Todd Stottlemyre (0–1)
HR: MIN – Kirby Puckett (1)

=== Game 5 ===
October 13, Skydome

Team	1	2	3	4	5	6	7	8	9	R	H	E
Minnesota	1	1	0	0	0	3	0	3	0	8	14	2
Toronto	0	0	3	2	0	0	0	0	0	5	9	1
W: David West (1–0) L: Duane Ward (0–1) S: Rick Aguilera (3)
HR: MIN – Kirby Puckett (2)

== Awards and honors ==
- Roberto Alomar, 2B, Gold Glove Award
- Joe Carter, Player of the Month Award, June
- Joe Carter, OF, Silver Slugger Award
- Juan Guzman, P, The Sporting News Rookie of the Year Award
- Devon White, OF, Gold Glove Award

All-Star Game

- Roberto Alomar, 2B, starter
- Joe Carter, OF, reserve
- Jimmy Key, P, reserve

== Farm system ==
Level	Team	League	Manager
AAA	Syracuse Chiefs	International League	Bob Bailor
AA	Knoxville Blue Jays	Southern League	John Stearns
A	Dunedin Blue Jays	Florida State League	Dennis Holmberg
A	Myrtle Beach Hurricanes	South Atlantic League	Garth Iorg
A-Short Season	St. Catharines Blue Jays	New York–Penn League	Doug Ault
Rookie	GCL Blue Jays	Gulf Coast League	Omar Malavé
Rookie	Medicine Hat Blue Jays	Pioneer League	J. J. Cannon
