= 1991 Cleveland Indians season =

1991 Cleveland Indians
- League: American League
- Division: East
- Ballpark: Cleveland Municipal Stadium
- City: Cleveland, Ohio
- Record: 57–105 (.352)
- Divisional place: 7th
- Owners: Richard Jacobs
- General managers: Hank Peters, John Hart
- Managers: John McNamara, Mike Hargrove
- Television: WUAB; Jack Corrigan, Mike Hegan; SportsChannel; John Sanders, Rick Manning
- Radio: WWWE; Herb Score, Tom Hamilton

The 1991 Cleveland Indians season was the 91st season for the franchise. The Indians lost 105 games, the most losses in franchise history.

== Offseason ==
- December 3, 1990: Mike Huff was drafted by the Indians from the Los Angeles Dodgers in the 1990 rule 5 draft.
- December 4, 1990: Cory Snyder and Lindsay Foster (minors) were traded by the Indians to the Chicago White Sox for Shawn Hillegas and Eric King.
- January 11, 1991: Luis Lopez was signed as a free agent by the Indians.
- January 16, 1991: Dave Otto was signed as a free agent by the Indians.
- January 16, 1991: Troy Neel was traded by the Indians to the Oakland Athletics for Larry Arndt.

== Regular season ==
On May 4, 1991, Chris James had 9 RBIs in a 20 to 6 win over the Oakland Athletics to set the single game RBI record for Cleveland.

=== Season standings ===
AL East
Team	W	L	Pct.	GB	Home	Road
Toronto Blue Jays	91	71	.562	—	46‍–‍35	45‍–‍36
Boston Red Sox	84	78	.519	7	43‍–‍38	41‍–‍40
Detroit Tigers	84	78	.519	7	49‍–‍32	35‍–‍46
Milwaukee Brewers	83	79	.512	8	43‍–‍37	40‍–‍42
New York Yankees	71	91	.438	20	39‍–‍42	32‍–‍49
Baltimore Orioles	67	95	.414	24	33‍–‍48	34‍–‍47
Cleveland Indians	57	105	.352	34	30‍–‍52	27‍–‍53

This is to date the most recent season the Indians have finished last in their division.

=== Record vs. opponents ===
1991 American League record Sources:
Team	BAL	BOS	CAL	CWS	CLE	DET	KC	MIL	MIN	NYY	OAK	SEA	TEX	TOR
Baltimore	—	8–5	6–6	4–8	7–6	5–8	4–8	3–10	4–8	5–8	3–9	4–8	9–3	5–8
Boston	5–8	—	4–8	7–5	9–4	5–8	7–5	7–6	3–9	6–7	8–4	9–3	5–7	9–4
California	6–6	8–4	—	8–5	7–5	5–7	9–4	6–6	8–5	6–6	1–12	6–7	5–8	6–6
Chicago	8–4	5–7	5–8	—	6–6	4–8	7–6	7–5	8–5	8–4	7–6	7–6	8–5	7–5
Cleveland	6–7	4–9	5–7	6–6	—	7–6	4–8	5–8	2–10	6–7	5–7	2–10	4–8	1–12
Detroit	8–5	8–5	7–5	8–4	6–7	—	8–4	4–9	4–8	8–5	4–8	8–4	6–6	5–8
Kansas City	8–4	5–7	4–9	6–7	8–4	4–8	—	9–3	6–7	7–5	6–7	7–6	7–6	5–7
Milwaukee	10–3	6–7	6–6	5–7	8–5	9–4	3–9	—	6–6	6–7	8–4	3–9	7–5	6–7
Minnesota	8–4	9–3	5–8	5–8	10–2	8–4	7–6	6–6	—	10–2	8–5	9–4	6–7	4–8
New York	8–5	7–6	6–6	4–8	7–6	5–8	5–7	7–6	2–10	—	6–6	3–9	5–7	6–7
Oakland	9–3	4–8	12–1	6–7	7–5	8–4	7–6	4–8	5–8	6–6	—	6–7	4–9	6–6
Seattle	8–4	3–9	7–6	6–7	10–2	4–8	6–7	9–3	4–9	9–3	7–6	—	5–8	5–7
Texas	3–9	7–5	8–5	5–8	8–4	6–6	6–7	5–7	7–6	7–5	9–4	8–5	—	6–6
Toronto	8–5	4–9	6–6	5–7	12–1	8–5	7–5	7–6	8–4	7–6	6–6	7–5	6–6	—

=== Game log ===
1991 Game Log: 57–105 (Home: 30–52; Away: 27–53)
April: 7–10 (Home: 1–5; Away: 6–5)

#	Date	Opponent	Score	Win	Loss	Save	Attendance	Record

May: 10–17 (Home: 5–9; Away: 5–8)

#	Date	Opponent	Score	Win	Loss	Save	Attendance	Record

June: 7–21 (Home: 6–9; Away: 1–12)

#	Date	Opponent	Score	Win	Loss	Save	Attendance	Record

July: 9–18 (Home: 4–8; Away: 5–10)

#	Date	Opponent	Score	Win	Loss	Save	Attendance	Record

August: 10–20 (Home: 7–10; Away: 3–10)

#	Date	Opponent	Score	Win	Loss	Save	Attendance	Record

September: 11–15 (Home: 6–8; Away: 5–7)

#	Date	Opponent	Score	Win	Loss	Save	Attendance	Record

October: 3–4 (Home: 1–3; Away: 2–1)

#	Date	Opponent	Score	Win	Loss	Save	Attendance	Record

Legend: = Win = Loss = Postponement
Bold = Indians team member

=== Notable transactions ===
- May 17, 1991: Mike Aldrete was signed as a free agent by the Indians.
- June 3, 1991: Paul Byrd was drafted by the Indians in the 4th round of the 1991 Major League Baseball draft. Player signed June 10, 1991.
- June 14, 1991: Tim Costo was traded by the Indians to the Cincinnati Reds for Reggie Jefferson.
- June 27, 1991: Tom Candiotti and Turner Ward were traded by the Indians to the Toronto Blue Jays for Glenallen Hill, Denis Boucher, Mark Whiten, and cash.
- July 5, 1991: Stan Jefferson was released by the Indians.
- July 12, 1991: Mike Huff was selected off waivers from the Indians by the Chicago White Sox.
- July 26, 1991: Brook Jacoby was traded by the Indians to the Oakland Athletics for Lee Tinsley and Apolinar Garcia (minors).

=== Opening Day Lineup ===
Opening Day Starters
#	Name	Position
2	Alex Cole	CF
14	Jerry Browne	2B
7	Chris James	DH
8	Albert Belle	LF
15	Sandy Alomar Jr.	C
26	Brook Jacoby	1B
9	Carlos Baerga	3B
16	Félix Fermín	SS
23	Mitch Webster	RF
21	Greg Swindell	P

=== Roster ===
1991 Cleveland Indians
**Roster**
**Pitchers**: 63 Eric Bell; 39 Willie Blair; 49 Denis Boucher; 49 Tom Candiotti; 46 Bruce Egloff; 36 Mauro Gozzo; 38 Shawn Hillegas; 11 Doug Jones; 40 Eric King; 58 Garland Kiser; 29 Tom Kramer; 62,50 Jeff Mutis; 41 Charles Nagy; 54 Rod Nichols; 31 Steve Olin; 47 Jesse Orosco; 27 Dave Otto; 32 Rudy Seánez; 57 Jeff Shaw; 21 Greg Swindell; 33 Efrain Valdez; 30 Sergio Valdez; 48 Mike Walker; 56 Mike York	**Catchers**: 15 Sandy Alomar Jr.; 22 Luis Lopez; 4 Joel Skinner; 28 Eddie Taubensee; **Infielders**: 43 Mike Aldrete; 9 Carlos Baerga; 14 Jerry Browne; 6 Jose Escobar; 16 Félix Fermín; 26 Brook Jacoby; 20 Reggie Jefferson; 10 Mark Lewis; 6 Ever Magallanes; 45 Jeff Manto; 42 Carlos Martínez; 44 Tony Perezchica; 6,25 Jim Thome	**Outfielders**: 37 Beau Allred; 8 Albert Belle; 2 Alex Cole; 37 José González; 24 Glenallen Hill; 44 Mike Huff; 7 Chris James; 73 Wayne Kirby; 20 Turner Ward; 23 Mitch Webster; 23 Mark Whiten	**Manager**: 12 Mike Hargrove (Jul 6 - Oct 6); 1 John McNamara (Apr 8 - Jul 5); **Coaches**: 25 Rich Dauer (third base); 12 Mike Hargrove (first base until July 5); 13 Luis Isaac (bullpen); 34 José Morales (hitting); 35 Mark Wiley (pitching); 51 Billy Williams (bench); 33 Gordon Mackenzie (first base starting July 6)

== Statistics ==
=== Batting ===
Note: G = Games played; AB = At bats; R = Runs scored; H = Hits; 2B = Doubles; 3B = Triples; HR = Home runs; RBI = Runs batted in; AVG = Batting average; SB = Stolen bases

Player	G	AB	R	H	2B	3B	HR	RBI	AVG	SB
Mike Aldrete	85	183	22	48	6	1	1	19	.262	1
Beau Allred	48	125	17	29	3	0	3	12	.232	2
Sandy Alomar Jr.	51	184	10	40	9	0	0	7	.217	0
Carlos Baerga	158	593	80	171	28	2	11	69	.288	3
Albert Belle	123	461	60	130	31	2	28	95	.282	3
Jerry Browne	107	290	28	66	5	2	1	29	.228	2
Alex Cole	122	387	58	114	17	3	0	21	.295	27
Jose Escobar	10	15	0	3	0	0	0	1	.200	0
Felix Fermin	129	424	30	111	13	2	0	31	.262	5
Jose Gonzalez	33	69	10	11	2	1	1	4	.159	8
Glenallen Hill	37	122	15	32	3	0	5	14	.262	4
Mike Huff	51	146	28	35	6	1	2	10	.240	11
Brook Jacoby	66	231	14	54	9	1	4	24	.234	0
Chris James	115	437	31	104	16	2	5	41	.238	3
Reggie Jefferson	26	101	10	20	3	0	2	12	.198	0
Wayne Kirby	21	43	4	9	2	0	0	5	.209	1
Mark Lewis	84	314	29	83	15	1	0	30	.264	2
Luis Lopez	35	82	7	18	4	1	0	7	.220	0
Ever Magallanes	3	2	0	0	0	0	0	0	.000	0
Jeff Manto	47	128	15	27	7	0	2	13	.211	2
Carlos Martinez	72	257	22	73	14	0	5	30	.284	3
Luis Medina	5	16	0	1	0	0	0	0	.063	0
Tony Perezchica	17	22	4	8	2	0	0	0	.364	0
Joel Skinner	99	284	23	69	14	0	1	24	.243	0
Ed Taubensee	26	66	5	16	2	1	0	8	.242	0
Jim Thome	27	98	7	25	4	2	1	9	.255	1
Turner Ward	40	100	11	23	7	0	0	5	.230	0
Mitch Webster	13	32	2	4	0	0	0	0	.125	2
Mark Whiten	70	258	34	66	14	4	7	26	.256	4
Team totals	162	5470	576	1390	236	26	79	546	.254	84

=== Pitching ===
Note: W = Wins; L = Losses; ERA = Earned run average; G = Games pitched; GS = Games started; SV = Saves; IP = Innings pitched; H = Hits allowed; R = Runs allowed; ER = Earned runs allowed; BB = Walks allowed; K = Strikeouts

Player	W	L	ERA	G	GS	SV	IP	H	R	ER	BB	K
Eric Bell	4	0	0.50	10	0	0	18.0	5	2	1	5	7
Willie Blair	2	3	6.75	11	5	0	36.0	58	27	27	10	13
Denis Boucher	1	4	8.34	5	5	0	22.2	35	21	21	8	13
Tom Candiotti	7	6	2.24	15	15	0	108.1	88	35	27	28	86
Bruce Egloff	0	0	4.76	6	0	0	5.2	8	3	3	4	8
Mauro Gozzo	0	0	19.29	2	2	0	4.2	9	10	10	7	3
Shawn Hillegas	3	4	4.34	51	3	7	83.0	67	42	40	46	66
Doug Jones	4	8	5.54	36	4	7	63.1	87	42	39	17	48
Eric King	6	11	4.60	25	24	0	150.2	166	83	77	44	59
Garland Kiser	0	0	9.64	7	0	0	4.2	7	5	5	4	3
Tom Kramer	0	0	17.36	4	0	0	4.2	10	9	9	6	4
Jeff Mutis	0	3	11.68	3	3	0	12.1	23	16	16	7	6
Charles Nagy	10	15	4.13	33	33	0	211.1	228	103	97	66	109
Rod Nichols	2	11	3.54	31	16	1	137.1	145	63	54	30	76
Steve Olin	3	6	3.36	48	0	17	56.1	61	26	21	23	38
Jesse Orosco	2	0	3.74	47	0	0	45.2	52	20	19	15	36
Dave Otto	2	8	4.23	18	14	0	100.0	108	52	47	27	47
Rudy Seanez	0	0	16.20	5	0	0	5.0	10	12	9	7	7
Jeff Shaw	0	5	3.36	29	1	1	72.1	72	34	27	27	31
Greg Swindell	9	16	3.48	33	33	0	238.0	241	112	92	31	169
Efrain Valdez	0	0	1.50	7	0	0	6.0	5	1	1	3	1
Sergio Valdez	1	0	5.51	6	0	0	16.1	15	11	10	5	11
Mike Walker	0	1	2.08	5	0	0	4.1	6	1	1	2	2
Mike York	1	4	6.75	14	4	0	34.2	45	29	26	19	19
Team totals	57	105	4.23	162	162	33	1441.1	1551	759	678	441	862

== Awards and honors ==
All-Star Game

- Sandy Alomar Jr., catcher, starter

== Farm system ==
Level	Team	League	Manager
AAA	Colorado Springs Sky Sox	Pacific Coast League	Charlie Manuel
AA	Canton–Akron Indians	Eastern League	Ken Bolek
A	Kinston Indians	Carolina League	Brian Graham
A	Columbus Indians	South Atlantic League	Mike Brown
A-Short Season	Watertown Indians	New York–Penn League	Gary Tuck
Rookie	Burlington Indians	Appalachian League	Dave Keller

LEAGUE CHAMPIONS: Kinston
