= 1991 Chicago White Sox season =

1991 Chicago White Sox
- League: American League
- Division: West
- Ballpark: New Comiskey Park
- City: Chicago
- Record: 87–75 (.537)
- Divisional place: 2nd
- Owners: Jerry Reinsdorf
- General managers: Ron Schueler
- Managers: Jeff Torborg
- Television: WGN-TV; SportsChannel Chicago (Ken Harrelson, Tom Paciorek)
- Radio: WMAQ (AM) (John Rooney, Wayne Hagin); WTAQ (Frank Diaz, Chico Carrasquel)

The 1991 Chicago White Sox season was the White Sox's 92nd season. They finished with a record of 87–75, good enough for second place in the American League West, 8 games behind of the first place Minnesota Twins, as the club opened the new Comiskey Park on April 18.

== Offseason ==
- November 30, 1990: Jerry Willard was released by the White Sox.
- December 3, 1990: Buddy Groom was drafted from the White Sox by the Detroit Tigers in the 1990 minor league draft.
- December 4, 1990: Shawn Hillegas and Eric King were traded by the White Sox to the Cleveland Indians for Cory Snyder and Lindsay Foster (minors).
- December 12, 1990: Charlie Hough was signed as a free agent by the White Sox.
- December 23, 1990: Iván Calderón and Barry Jones were traded by the White Sox to the Montreal Expos for Tim Raines, Jeff Carter and a player to be named later. The Expos completed the deal by sending Mario Brito (minors) to the White Sox on February 15.
- March 18, 1991: Ron Coomer was signed as a free agent with the Chicago White Sox.
- March 31, 1991: Joe Borowski was traded by the White Sox to the Baltimore Orioles for Pete Rose Jr.

== Regular season ==
- Frank Thomas led the Major Leagues in on-base percentage with .457. He became the 38th player in history to reach base at least 300 times in one season.

=== New Comiskey Park ===
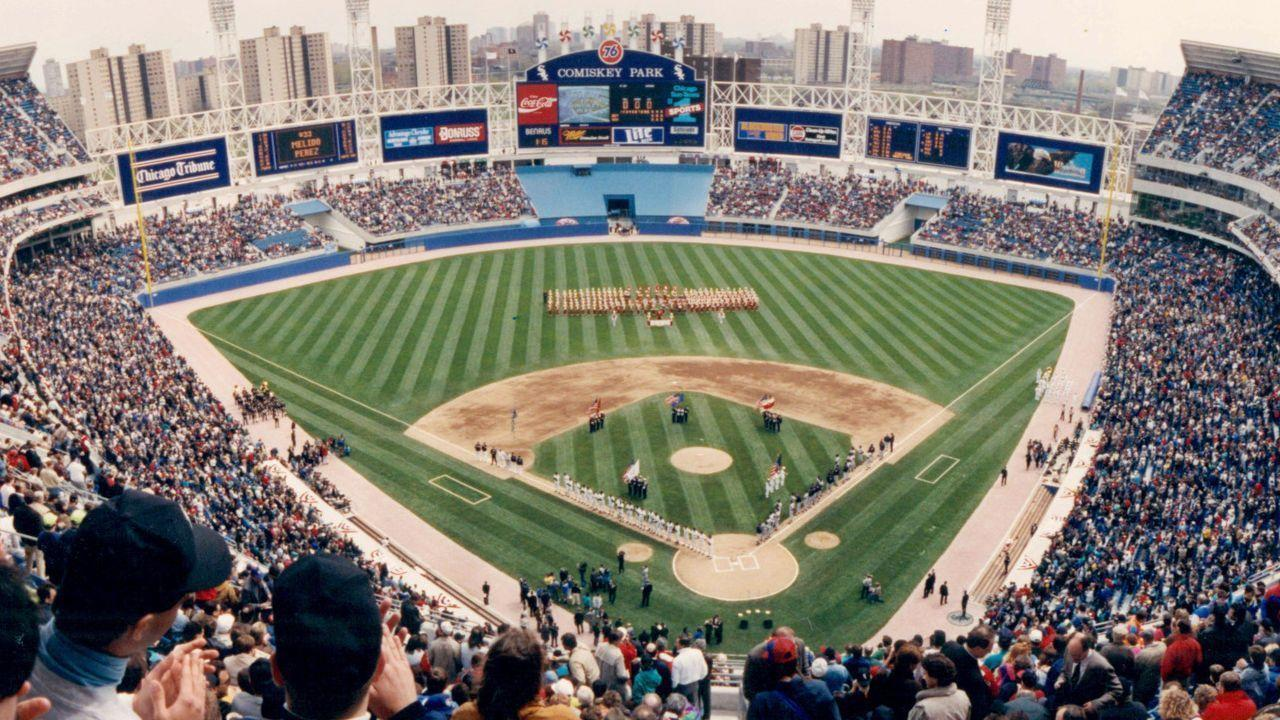
View from the upper deck of new Comiskey Park

- The White Sox started the season at new Comiskey Park. The park opened for the 1991 season, after the White Sox had spent 80 years at Comiskey Park. The new park was completed at a cost of US$167 million.
- The stadium was the first new sports venue built in Chicago since 1929, when Chicago Stadium was built. It was also the first baseball-only park since Royals Stadium (now Kauffman Stadium) opened in 1973, and the last built before the recent wave of new "retro-classic" stadiums. However, a few design features from the old park were retained. Most notable among them is the "exploding scoreboard", which is a replica of the one installed by Bill Veeck at the old park in 1960.
- Keeping up with tradition, after a White Sox player hits a home run, and eventually, at the beginning of all games, as well as after a White Sox victory, the scoreboard lights up in color and fireworks explode in the sky. The ballpark, as well as its entrance has several exterior arched windows. The Sox Shower, located in left-center field, is a place where fans can cool off during hot gamedays.
- The first game at new Comiskey was on April 18, 1991, against the Detroit Tigers. Despite starting the season on the road with a 6–1 record, the White Sox lost the game by a score of 16–0.

==== First Game at New Comiskey ====
===== Scorecard =====
April 18, New Comiskey Park, Chicago, Illinois

| Team | 1 | 2 | 3 | 4 | 5 | 6 | 7 | 8 | 9 | R | H | E |
|---|---|---|---|---|---|---|---|---|---|---|---|---|
| Detroit | 0 | 0 | 6 | 10 | 0 | 0 | 0 | 0 | 0 | 16 | 19 | 0 |
| Chicago | 0 | 0 | 0 | 0 | 0 | 0 | 0 | 0 | 0 | 0 | 7 | 1 |
W: Frank Tanana (1-1) L: Jack McDowell (2–1)
HRs: Cecil Fielder (1), Rob Deer 2 (1, 2), Tony Phillips (2), Umpires: HP–Steve Palermo, 1B–Mike Reilly, 2B–Larry Young, 3B–Rich Garcia. Time 3:11. Attendance 42,191.

====== Batting ======
| Detroit Tigers | AB | R | H | RBI | Chicago White Sox | AB | R | H | RBI |
|---|---|---|---|---|---|---|---|---|---|
| Phillips, dh, ss | 6 | 2 | 4 | 3 | Raines, dh | 4 | 0 | 1 | 0 |
| Trammell, ss | 5 | 3 | 4 | 2 | Johnson, cf | 4 | 0 | 1 | 0 |
| Tanana, p | 1 | 0 | 0 | 0 | Ventura, 3b | 4 | 0 | 2 | 0 |
| Whitaker, 2b | 3 | 2 | 3 | 0 | Thomas, 1b | 4 | 0 | 1 | 0 |
| Bernazard, 2b | 2 | 0 | 1 | 0 | Fisk, c | 2 | 0 | 1 | 0 |
| Fielder, 1b | 3 | 2 | 2 | 4 | Merullo, c | 2 | 0 | 0 | 0 |
| Bergman, 1b | 2 | 0 | 0 | 0 | Sosa, rf | 4 | 0 | 0 | 0 |
| Incaviglia, lf | 3 | 0 | 0 | 1 | Snyder, lf | 3 | 0 | 0 | 0 |
| Cuyler, cf | 2 | 0 | 1 | 0 | Guillen, ss | 1 | 0 | 0 | 0 |
| Tettleton c, rf | 6 | 2 | 1 | 2 | Grebeck, ph, ss | 2 | 0 | 0 | 0 |
| Deer, rf | 5 | 2 | 2 | 4 | Fletcher 2b | 1 | 0 | 0 | 0 |
| Allanson, c | 0 | 0 | 0 | 0 | Cora, ph,2b | 2 | 0 | 1 | 0 |
| Shelby, cf, lf | 5 | 1 | 1 | 0 | McDowell, p | 0 | 0 | 0 | 0 |
| Fryman, 3b | 1 | 2 | 0 | 0 | Drahman, p | 0 | 0 | 0 | 0 |
| de los Santos, 3b | 2 | 0 | 0 | 0 | Patterson, p | 0 | 0 | 0 | 0 |
| | | | | | Radinsky, p | 0 | 0 | 0 | 0 |
| | | | | | Pall, p | 0 | 0 | 0 | 0 |
| | | | | | Thigpen, p | 0 | 0 | 0 | 0 |
| Totals | 46 | 16 | 19 | 16 | Totals | 33 | 0 | 7 | 0 |

====== Pitching ======
| Chicago White Sox | IP | H | R | ER | BB | SO |
|---|---|---|---|---|---|---|
| McDowell, L (2–1) | 2.2 | 5 | 6 | 6 | 3 | 0 |
| Drahman | 0.2 | 5 | 5 | 5 | 1 | 0 |
| Patterson | 2.2 | 7 | 5 | 4 | 1 | 2 |
| Radinsky | 1.0 | 1 | 0 | 0 | 0 | 2 |
| Pall | 1.0 | 1 | 0 | 0 | 0 | 2 |
| Thigpen | 1.0 | 0 | 0 | 0 | 0 | 0 |
| Totals | 8.0 | 16 | 9 | 9 | 3 | 7 |

| Detroit Tigers | IP | H | R | ER | BB | SO |
|---|---|---|---|---|---|---|
| Tanana, W (1-1) | 9.0 | 7 | 0 | 0 | 0 | 3 |
| Totals | 9.0 | 7 | 0 | 0 | 0 | 3 |

=== 1991 Opening Day lineup ===
- Tim Raines, DH
- Lance Johnson, CF
- Robin Ventura, 3B
- Frank Thomas, 1B
- Carlton Fisk, C
- Cory Snyder, LF
- Sammy Sosa, RF
- Ozzie Guillén, SS
- Scott Fletcher, 2B
- Jack McDowell, P

=== Season standings ===
AL West
| Team | W | L | Pct. | GB | Home | Road |
|---|---|---|---|---|---|---|
| Minnesota Twins | 95 | 67 | .586 | — | 51‍–‍30 | 44‍–‍37 |
| Chicago White Sox | 87 | 75 | .537 | 8 | 46‍–‍35 | 41‍–‍40 |
| Texas Rangers | 85 | 77 | .525 | 10 | 46‍–‍35 | 39‍–‍42 |
| Oakland Athletics | 84 | 78 | .519 | 11 | 47‍–‍34 | 37‍–‍44 |
| Seattle Mariners | 83 | 79 | .512 | 12 | 45‍–‍36 | 38‍–‍43 |
| Kansas City Royals | 82 | 80 | .506 | 13 | 40‍–‍41 | 42‍–‍39 |
| California Angels | 81 | 81 | .500 | 14 | 40‍–‍41 | 41‍–‍40 |

=== Record vs. opponents ===
1991 American League record Sources:
| Team | BAL | BOS | CAL | CWS | CLE | DET | KC | MIL | MIN | NYY | OAK | SEA | TEX | TOR |
|---|---|---|---|---|---|---|---|---|---|---|---|---|---|---|
| Baltimore | — | 8–5 | 6–6 | 4–8 | 7–6 | 5–8 | 4–8 | 3–10 | 4–8 | 5–8 | 3–9 | 4–8 | 9–3 | 5–8 |
| Boston | 5–8 | — | 4–8 | 7–5 | 9–4 | 5–8 | 7–5 | 7–6 | 3–9 | 6–7 | 8–4 | 9–3 | 5–7 | 9–4 |
| California | 6–6 | 8–4 | — | 8–5 | 7–5 | 5–7 | 9–4 | 6–6 | 8–5 | 6–6 | 1–12 | 6–7 | 5–8 | 6–6 |
| Chicago | 8–4 | 5–7 | 5–8 | — | 6–6 | 4–8 | 7–6 | 7–5 | 8–5 | 8–4 | 7–6 | 7–6 | 8–5 | 7–5 |
| Cleveland | 6–7 | 4–9 | 5–7 | 6–6 | — | 7–6 | 4–8 | 5–8 | 2–10 | 6–7 | 5–7 | 2–10 | 4–8 | 1–12 |
| Detroit | 8–5 | 8–5 | 7–5 | 8–4 | 6–7 | — | 8–4 | 4–9 | 4–8 | 8–5 | 4–8 | 8–4 | 6–6 | 5–8 |
| Kansas City | 8–4 | 5–7 | 4–9 | 6–7 | 8–4 | 4–8 | — | 9–3 | 6–7 | 7–5 | 6–7 | 7–6 | 7–6 | 5–7 |
| Milwaukee | 10–3 | 6–7 | 6–6 | 5–7 | 8–5 | 9–4 | 3–9 | — | 6–6 | 6–7 | 8–4 | 3–9 | 7–5 | 6–7 |
| Minnesota | 8–4 | 9–3 | 5–8 | 5–8 | 10–2 | 8–4 | 7–6 | 6–6 | — | 10–2 | 8–5 | 9–4 | 6–7 | 4–8 |
| New York | 8–5 | 7–6 | 6–6 | 4–8 | 7–6 | 5–8 | 5–7 | 7–6 | 2–10 | — | 6–6 | 3–9 | 5–7 | 6–7 |
| Oakland | 9–3 | 4–8 | 12–1 | 6–7 | 7–5 | 8–4 | 7–6 | 4–8 | 5–8 | 6–6 | — | 6–7 | 4–9 | 6–6 |
| Seattle | 8–4 | 3–9 | 7–6 | 6–7 | 10–2 | 4–8 | 6–7 | 9–3 | 4–9 | 9–3 | 7–6 | — | 5–8 | 5–7 |
| Texas | 3–9 | 7–5 | 8–5 | 5–8 | 8–4 | 6–6 | 6–7 | 5–7 | 7–6 | 7–5 | 9–4 | 8–5 | — | 6–6 |
| Toronto | 8–5 | 4–9 | 6–6 | 5–7 | 12–1 | 8–5 | 7–5 | 7–6 | 8–4 | 7–6 | 6–6 | 7–5 | 6–6 | — |

=== Notable transactions ===
- April 3, 1991: Bo Jackson was signed as a free agent by the White Sox.
- April 12, 1991: Danny Heep was signed as a free agent by the White Sox.
- April 13, 1991: Steve Lyons was released by the White Sox.
- May 18, 1991: Magglio Ordóñez was signed as an amateur free agent by the White Sox.
- July 12, 1991: Mike Huff was selected off waivers by the White Sox from the Cleveland Indians.
- July 14, 1991: Cory Snyder was traded by the White Sox to the Toronto Blue Jays for Shawn Jeter and a player to be named later. The Blue Jays completed the deal by sending Steve Wapnick to the White Sox on September 4.

=== Roster ===
1991 Chicago White Sox
Roster
| Pitchers: 40 Wilson Álvarez; 41 Jeff Carter; 50 Brian Drahman; 42 Tom Drees; 45 Wayne Edwards; 32 Alex Fernandez; 43 Ramón García; 39 Roberto Hernández; 27 Greg Hibbard; 49 Charlie Hough; 29 Jack McDowell; 22 Donn Pall; 34 Ken Patterson; 33 Mélido Pérez; 31 Scott Radinsky; 37 Bobby Thigpen; 51 Steve Wapnick | Catchers: 72 Carlton Fisk; 20 Ron Karkovice; 5 Matt Merullo; 47 Don Wakamatsu; Infielders: 28 Esteban Beltré; 21 Joey Cora; 7 Scott Fletcher; 14 Craig Grebeck; 13 Ozzie Guillén; 42 Ron Kittle; 44 Dan Pasqua; 23 Robin Ventura; 35 Frank Thomas | Outfielders: 12 Mike Huff; 1 Lance Johnson; 26 Rodney McCray; 24 Warren Newson; 30 Tim Raines; 28 Cory Snyder; 25 Sammy Sosa; Other batters: 8 Bo Jackson | Manager: 10 Jeff Torborg; Coaches: 18 Terry Bevington (Third Base); 46 Sammy Ellis (Pitching); 36 Barry Foote (First Base); 6 Walt Hriniak (Hitting); 53 Dave LaRoche (Bullpen); 15 Joe Nossek (Bench); ? John Stephenson (Bullpen Catcher) |

== Player stats ==
| = Indicates league leader |

=== Batting ===
Note: G = Games played; AB = At bats; R = Runs scored; H = Hits; 2B = Doubles; 3B = Triples; HR = Home runs; RBI = Runs batted in; BB = Base on balls; SO = Strikeouts; AVG = Batting average; SB = Stolen bases

| Player | G | AB | R | H | 2B | 3B | HR | RBI | BB | SO | AVG | SB |
|---|---|---|---|---|---|---|---|---|---|---|---|---|
| Esteban Beltre, SS | 8 | 6 | 0 | 1 | 0 | 0 | 0 | 0 | 1 | 1 | .167 | 1 |
| Joey Cora, 2B | 100 | 228 | 37 | 55 | 2 | 3 | 0 | 18 | 20 | 21 | .241 | 18 |
| Carlton Fisk, C | 134 | 460 | 42 | 111 | 25 | 0 | 18 | 74 | 32 | 86 | .241 | 1 |
| Scott Fletcher, 2B | 90 | 248 | 14 | 51 | 10 | 1 | 1 | 28 | 17 | 26 | .206 | 0 |
| Craig Grebeck, 2B, 3B, SS | 107 | 224 | 37 | 63 | 16 | 3 | 6 | 31 | 38 | 40 | .281 | 1 |
| Ozzie Guillén, SS | 154 | 524 | 52 | 143 | 20 | 3 | 3 | 49 | 11 | 38 | .273 | 21 |
| Mike Huff, OF | 51 | 97 | 14 | 26 | 4 | 1 | 1 | 15 | 12 | 18 | .268 | 3 |
| Bo Jackson, DH | 23 | 71 | 8 | 16 | 4 | 0 | 3 | 14 | 12 | 25 | .225 | 0 |
| Lance Johnson, CF | 159 | 588 | 72 | 161 | 14 | 13 | 0 | 49 | 26 | 58 | .274 | 26 |
| Ron Karkovice, C | 75 | 167 | 25 | 41 | 13 | 0 | 5 | 22 | 15 | 42 | .246 | 0 |
| Ron Kittle, 1B | 17 | 47 | 7 | 9 | 0 | 0 | 2 | 7 | 5 | 9 | .191 | 0 |
| Rodney McCray, OF | 17 | 7 | 2 | 2 | 0 | 0 | 0 | 0 | 0 | 2 | .286 | 1 |
| Matt Merullo, C, 1B, DH | 80 | 140 | 8 | 32 | 1 | 0 | 5 | 21 | 9 | 18 | .229 | 0 |
| Warren Newson, OF | 71 | 132 | 20 | 39 | 5 | 0 | 4 | 25 | 28 | 34 | .295 | 2 |
| Dan Pasqua, 1B, OF, DH | 134 | 417 | 71 | 108 | 22 | 5 | 18 | 66 | 62 | 86 | .259 | 0 |
| Tim Raines, LF | 155 | 609 | 102 | 163 | 20 | 6 | 5 | 50 | 83 | 68 | .268 | 51 |
| Sammy Sosa, RF, CF | 116 | 316 | 39 | 64 | 10 | 1 | 10 | 33 | 14 | 98 | .203 | 13 |
| Cory Snyder, OF, 1B | 50 | 117 | 10 | 22 | 4 | 0 | 3 | 11 | 6 | 41 | .188 | 0 |
| Frank Thomas, DH, 1B | 158 | 559 | 104 | 178 | 31 | 2 | 32 | 109 | 138 | 112 | .318 | 1 |
| Robin Ventura, 3B, 1B | 157 | 606 | 92 | 172 | 25 | 1 | 23 | 100 | 80 | 67 | .284 | 2 |
| Don Wakamatsu, C | 18 | 31 | 2 | 7 | 0 | 0 | 0 | 0 | 1 | 6 | .226 | 0 |
| Team totals | 162 | 5594 | 758 | 1464 | 226 | 39 | 139 | 722 | 610 | 896 | .262 | 134 |

=== Pitching ===
Note: W = Wins; L = Losses; ERA = Earned run average; G = Games pitched; GS = Games started; SV = Saves; IP = Innings pitched; H = Hits allowed; R = Runs allowed; ER = Earned runs allowed; HR = Home runs allowed; BB = Walks allowed; K = Strikeouts

| Player | W | L | ERA | G | GS | SV | IP | H | R | ER | HR | BB | K |
|---|---|---|---|---|---|---|---|---|---|---|---|---|---|
| Wilson Álvarez | 3 | 2 | 3.51 | 10 | 9 | 0 | 56.1 | 47 | 26 | 22 | 9 | 29 | 32 |
| Jeff Carter | 0 | 1 | 5.25 | 5 | 2 | 0 | 12.0 | 8 | 8 | 7 | 1 | 5 | 2 |
| Brian Drahman | 3 | 2 | 3.23 | 28 | 0 | 0 | 30.2 | 21 | 12 | 11 | 4 | 14 | 18 |
| Tom Drees | 0 | 0 | 12.27 | 4 | 0 | 0 | 7.1 | 10 | 10 | 10 | 4 | 6 | 2 |
| Wayne Edwards | 0 | 2 | 3.86 | 13 | 0 | 0 | 23.1 | 22 | 14 | 10 | 2 | 20 | 12 |
| Alex Fernandez | 9 | 13 | 4.51 | 34 | 32 | 0 | 191.2 | 186 | 100 | 96 | 16 | 90 | 145 |
| Ramón García | 4 | 4 | 5.40 | 16 | 15 | 0 | 78.1 | 79 | 50 | 47 | 13 | 33 | 40 |
| Roberto Hernández | 1 | 0 | 7.80 | 9 | 3 | 0 | 15.0 | 18 | 15 | 13 | 1 | 7 | 6 |
| Greg Hibbard | 11 | 11 | 4.31 | 32 | 29 | 0 | 194.0 | 196 | 107 | 93 | 23 | 58 | 71 |
| Charlie Hough | 9 | 10 | 4.02 | 31 | 29 | 0 | 199.1 | 167 | 98 | 89 | 21 | 94 | 107 |
| Jack McDowell | 17 | 10 | 3.41 | 35 | 35 | 0 | 253.2 | 212 | 97 | 96 | 19 | 84 | 191 |
| Donn Pall | 7 | 2 | 2.41 | 51 | 0 | 0 | 71.0 | 59 | 22 | 19 | 7 | 23 | 40 |
| Ken Patterson | 3 | 0 | 2.83 | 43 | 0 | 1 | 63.2 | 48 | 22 | 20 | 5 | 36 | 32 |
| Mélido Pérez | 8 | 7 | 5.25 | 49 | 8 | 1 | 135.2 | 111 | 49 | 47 | 15 | 52 | 128 |
| Scott Radinsky | 5 | 5 | 2.02 | 67 | 0 | 8 | 71.1 | 53 | 18 | 16 | 4 | 25 | 49 |
| Bobby Thigpen | 7 | 5 | 3.49 | 67 | 0 | 30 | 69.2 | 63 | 32 | 27 | 10 | 46 | 47 |
| Steve Wapnick | 0 | 1 | 1.80 | 6 | 0 | 0 | 5.0 | 2 | 1 | 1 | 0 | 4 | 1 |
| Team totals | 87 | 75 | 3.79 | 162 | 162 | 40 | 1478.0 | 1302 | 681 | 622 | 154 | 626 | 923 |

== Awards and honors ==
- Frank Thomas – Major League Baseball Leader, On-Base Percentage (.457)

All-Star Game

- Jack McDowell, pitcher, reserve
- Carlton Fisk, catcher, reserve
- Ozzie Guillén, shortstop, reserve

== Farm system ==
| Level | Team | League | Manager |
|---|---|---|---|
| AAA | Vancouver Canadians | Pacific Coast League | Marv Foley and Rick Renick |
| AA | Birmingham Barons | Southern League | Tony Franklin |
| A | Sarasota White Sox | Florida State League | Rick Patterson |
| A | South Bend White Sox | Midwest League | Tommy Thompson |
| A-Short Season | Utica Blue Sox | New York–Penn League | Mike Gellinger |
| Rookie | GCL White Sox | Gulf Coast League | Jaime García |
