= 1991 Baltimore Orioles season =

Major League Baseball season

1991 Baltimore Orioles
- League: American League
- Division: East
- Ballpark: Memorial Stadium
- City: Baltimore, Maryland
- Record: 67–95 (.414)
- Divisional place: 6th
- Owners: Eli Jacobs
- General managers: Roland Hemond
- Managers: Frank Robinson and Johnny Oates
- Television: WMAR-TV (Jon Miller, Brooks Robinson, Scott Garceau, Jim Palmer); Home Team Sports (Mel Proctor, John Lowenstein)
- Radio: WBAL (AM) (Chuck Thompson, Jon Miller, Ken Levine)

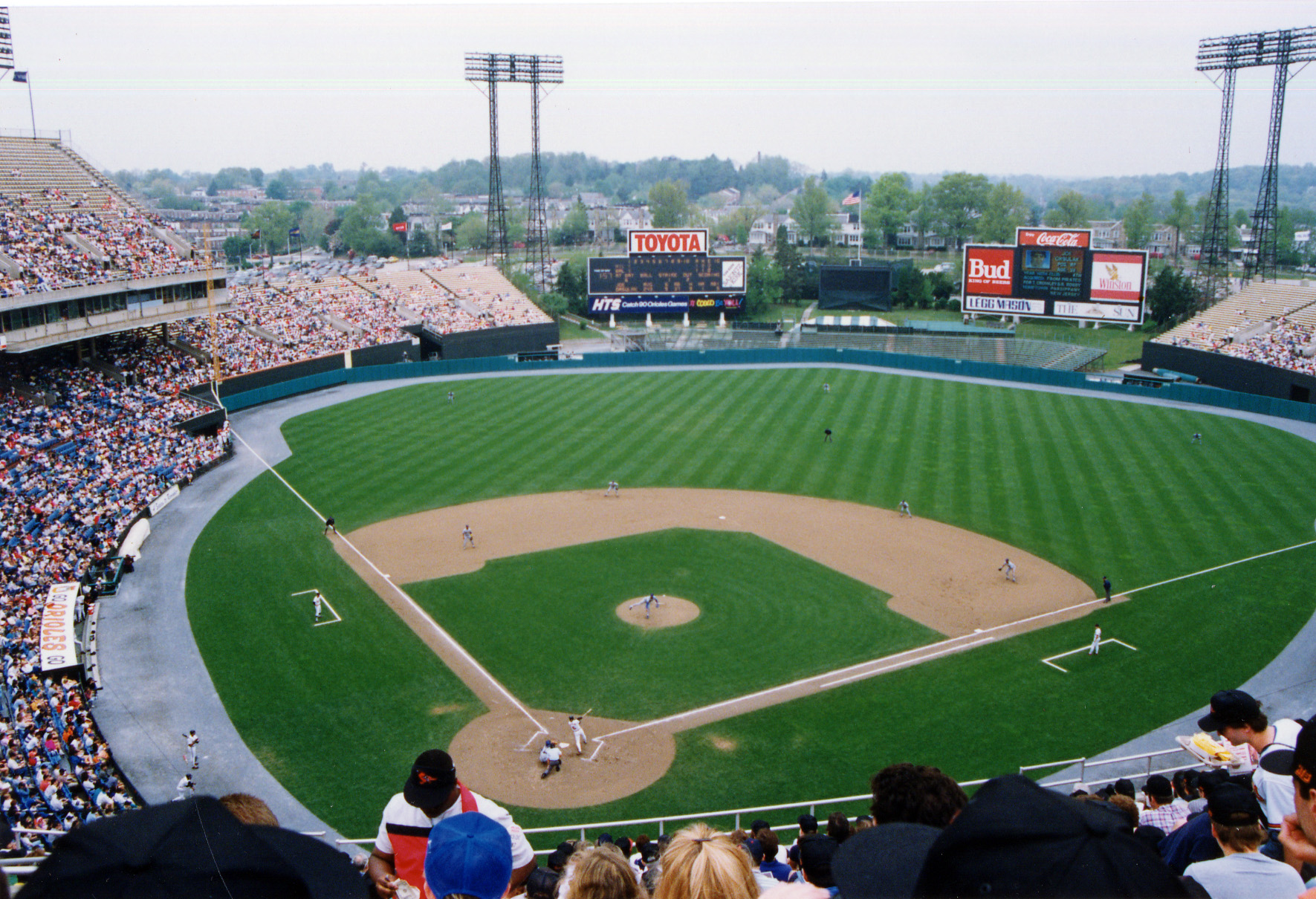
The Baltimore Orioles at play during a home game at Memorial Stadium in 1991.

The 1991 Baltimore Orioles season was the 91st season in Baltimore Orioles franchise history, the 38th in Baltimore, and the 38th and final at Memorial Stadium, as they would move into Oriole Park at Camden Yards the following year. The Orioles finished sixth in the American League East with a record of 67 wins and 95 losses. Cal Ripken. Jr. would be the first shortstop in the history of the American League to win two MVP awards in a career.

== Offseason ==
- October 10, 1990: Dorn Taylor was released by the Orioles.
- December 12, 1990: Todd Frohwirth was signed as a free agent by the Orioles.
- December 14, 1990: Mickey Weston was traded by the Orioles to the Toronto Blue Jays for Paul Kilgus.
- January 1, 1991: Roy Smith was signed as a free agent by the Orioles.
- January 10, 1991: Curt Schilling, Steve Finley and Pete Harnisch were traded by the Orioles to the Houston Astros for Glenn Davis.
- January 11, 1991: Mickey Tettleton was traded by the Orioles to the Detroit Tigers for Jeff Robinson.
- March 31, 1991: Pete Rose Jr. was traded by the Orioles to the Chicago White Sox for Joe Borowski.

== Regular season ==
- April 13, 1991: Cal Ripken Jr. had 7 RBI in game versus the Texas Rangers.
- May 15, 1991: President George H.W. Bush attended a baseball game in Baltimore with Her Majesty, Queen Elizabeth II. The two saw the Oakland Athletics play the Baltimore Orioles for two innings.
- July 13, 1991, Bob Milacki, Mike Flanagan, Mark Williamson and Gregg Olson combined for a no-hitter versus the Oakland Athletics.
- Cal Ripken Jr. became the fourth shortstop in the history of Major League Baseball to have 30 home runs in one season and won the AL MVP award.
- Cal Ripken Jr. won the Gold Glove in 1991 after missing out in 1990 even though he set the single season record for both the fewest errors by a shortstop (3) and also the record for most total chances in a single season.

=== Opening Day starters ===
- Jeff Ballard
- Glenn Davis
- Mike Devereaux
- Dwight Evans
- Sam Horn
- Bob Melvin
- Randy Milligan
- Billy Ripken
- Cal Ripken Jr.
- Craig Worthington

=== Season standings ===
AL East
Team	W	L	Pct.	GB	Home	Road
Toronto Blue Jays	91	71	.562	—	46‍–‍35	45‍–‍36
Boston Red Sox	84	78	.519	7	43‍–‍38	41‍–‍40
Detroit Tigers	84	78	.519	7	49‍–‍32	35‍–‍46
Milwaukee Brewers	83	79	.512	8	43‍–‍37	40‍–‍42
New York Yankees	71	91	.438	20	39‍–‍42	32‍–‍49
Baltimore Orioles	67	95	.414	24	33‍–‍48	34‍–‍47
Cleveland Indians	57	105	.352	34	30‍–‍52	27‍–‍53

=== Record vs. opponents ===
1991 American League record Sources:
Team	BAL	BOS	CAL	CWS	CLE	DET	KC	MIL	MIN	NYY	OAK	SEA	TEX	TOR
Baltimore	—	8–5	6–6	4–8	7–6	5–8	4–8	3–10	4–8	5–8	3–9	4–8	9–3	5–8
Boston	5–8	—	4–8	7–5	9–4	5–8	7–5	7–6	3–9	6–7	8–4	9–3	5–7	9–4
California	6–6	8–4	—	8–5	7–5	5–7	9–4	6–6	8–5	6–6	1–12	6–7	5–8	6–6
Chicago	8–4	5–7	5–8	—	6–6	4–8	7–6	7–5	8–5	8–4	7–6	7–6	8–5	7–5
Cleveland	6–7	4–9	5–7	6–6	—	7–6	4–8	5–8	2–10	6–7	5–7	2–10	4–8	1–12
Detroit	8–5	8–5	7–5	8–4	6–7	—	8–4	4–9	4–8	8–5	4–8	8–4	6–6	5–8
Kansas City	8–4	5–7	4–9	6–7	8–4	4–8	—	9–3	6–7	7–5	6–7	7–6	7–6	5–7
Milwaukee	10–3	6–7	6–6	5–7	8–5	9–4	3–9	—	6–6	6–7	8–4	3–9	7–5	6–7
Minnesota	8–4	9–3	5–8	5–8	10–2	8–4	7–6	6–6	—	10–2	8–5	9–4	6–7	4–8
New York	8–5	7–6	6–6	4–8	7–6	5–8	5–7	7–6	2–10	—	6–6	3–9	5–7	6–7
Oakland	9–3	4–8	12–1	6–7	7–5	8–4	7–6	4–8	5–8	6–6	—	6–7	4–9	6–6
Seattle	8–4	3–9	7–6	6–7	10–2	4–8	6–7	9–3	4–9	9–3	7–6	—	5–8	5–7
Texas	3–9	7–5	8–5	5–8	8–4	6–6	6–7	5–7	7–6	7–5	9–4	8–5	—	6–6
Toronto	8–5	4–9	6–6	5–7	12–1	8–5	7–5	7–6	8–4	7–6	6–6	7–5	6–6	—

=== Notable transactions ===
- April 2, 1991: Mike Flanagan was signed as a free agent by the Orioles.
- April 7, 1991: Ernie Whitt was signed as a free agent by the Orioles.
- June 3, 1991: Alex Ochoa was drafted by the Orioles in the 3rd round of the 1991 Major League Baseball draft. Player signed June 10, 1991.

=== Roster ===
1991 Baltimore Orioles
Roster
Pitchers: 29 Jeff Ballard; 48 José Bautista; 58 Francisco de la Rosa; 46 Mike Flanagan; 49 Todd Frohwirth; 45 Kevin Hickey; 27 Dave Johnson; 51 Stacy Jones; 17 Paul Kilgus; 19 Ben McDonald; 52 José Mesa; 18 Bob Milacki; 42 Mike Mussina; 30 Gregg Olson; 45 Jim Poole; 53 Arthur Rhodes; 34 Jeff Robinson; 43 Roy Smith; 50 Anthony Telford; 32 Mark Williamson	Catchers: 28 Chris Hoiles; 2 Bob Melvin; 41 Jeff Tackett; 11 Ernie Whitt; Infielders: 1 Juan Bell; 37 Glenn Davis; 10 Leo Gómez; 36 Tim Hulett; 39 Randy Milligan; 3 Billy Ripken; 8 Cal Ripken Jr.; 21 David Segui; 28 Shane Turner; 25 Craig Worthington	Outfielders: 9 Brady Anderson; 12 Mike Devereaux; 24 Dwight Evans; 14 Chito Martínez; 38 Jeff McKnight; 11 Luis Mercedes; 6 Joe Orsulak; Other batters: 15 Sam Horn	Manager: 26 Johnny Oates; 20 Frank Robinson; Coaches: 44 Elrod Hendricks (Bullpen); 31 Al Jackson (Pitching); 40 Tom McCraw (Hitting); 47 Curt Motton (First Base); 26 Johnny Oates (Bench); 7 Cal Ripken, Sr. (Third Base)

== Player stats ==
= Indicates team leader

=== Batting ===
==== Starters by position ====
Note: Pos = Position; G = Games played; AB = At bats; H = Hits; Avg. = Batting average; HR = Home runs; RBI = Runs batted in

Pos	Player	G	AB	H	Avg.	HR	RBI
C	Chris Hoiles	107	341	83	.243	11	31
1B	Randy Milligan	141	483	127	.263	16	70
2B	Billy Ripken	104	287	62	.216	0	14
3B	Leo Gómez	118	391	91	.233	16	45
SS	Cal Ripken Jr.	162	650	210	.323	34	114
LF	Joe Orsulak	143	486	135	.278	5	43
CF	Mike Devereaux	149	608	158	.260	19	59
RF	Dwight Evans	101	270	73	.270	6	38
DH	Sam Horn	121	317	74	.233	23	61

==== Other batters ====
Note: G = Games played; AB = At bats; H = Hits; Avg. = Batting average; HR = Home runs; RBI = Runs batted in

Player	G	AB	H	Avg.	HR	RBI
Brady Anderson	113	256	59	.230	2	27
Bob Melvin	79	228	57	.250	1	23
Chito Martínez	67	216	58	.269	13	33
David Segui	86	212	59	.278	2	22
Juan Bell	100	209	36	.172	1	15
Tim Hulett	79	206	42	.204	7	18
Glenn Davis	49	176	40	.227	10	28
Craig Worthington	31	102	23	.225	4	12
Ernie Whitt	35	62	15	.242	0	3
Luis Mercedes	19	54	11	.204	0	2
Jeff McKnight	16	41	7	.171	0	2
Jeff Tackett	6	8	1	.125	0	0
Shane Turner	4	1	0	.000	0	0

=== Pitching ===
==== Starting pitchers ====
Note: G = Games pitched; IP = Innings pitched; W = Wins; L = Losses; ERA = Earned run average; SO = Strikeouts

Player	G	IP	W	L	ERA	SO
Bob Milacki	31	184.0	10	9	4.01	108
Ben McDonald	21	126.1	6	8	4.84	85
Jeff Ballard	26	123.2	6	12	5.60	37
José Mesa	23	123.2	6	11	5.97	64
Jeff Robinson	21	104.1	4	9	5.18	65
Mike Mussina	12	87.2	4	5	2.87	52
Roy Smith	17	80.1	5	4	5.60	25
Arthur Rhodes	8	36.0	0	3	8.00	23

==== Other pitchers ====
Note: G = Games pitched; IP = Innings pitched; W = Wins; L = Losses; ERA = Earned run average; SO = Strikeouts

Player	G	IP	W	L	ERA	SO
Dave Johnson	22	84.0	4	8	7.07	38
Anthony Telford	9	26.2	0	0	4.05	24
Stacy Jones	4	11.0	0	0	4.09	10

==== Relief pitchers ====
Note: G = Games pitched; W = Wins; L = Losses; SV = Saves; ERA = Earned run average; SO = Strikeouts

Player	G	W	L	SV	ERA	SO
Gregg Olson	72	4	6	31	3.18	72
Mark Williamson	65	5	5	4	4.48	53
Mike Flanagan	64	2	7	3	2.38	55
Todd Frohwirth	51	7	3	3	1.87	77
Paul Kilgus	38	0	2	1	5.08	32
Jim Poole	24	3	2	0	2.00	34
Kevin Hickey	19	1	0	0	9.00	10
José Bautista	5	0	1	0	16.88	3
Francisco de la Rosa	2	0	0	0	4.50	1

== Awards and honors ==
- Cal Ripken Jr., American League Most Valuable Player
- Cal Ripken Jr., All-Star Game Most Valuable Player
- Cal Ripken Jr., Winner, All-Star Game Home Run Hitting Contest
- Cal Ripken Jr., Rawlings Gold Glove Award
- Joe Orsulak, Led American League, 22 Outfield Assists

All-Star Game

- Cal Ripken Jr., shortstop

== Farm system ==
Level	Team	League	Manager
AAA	Rochester Red Wings	International League	Greg Biagini
AA	Hagerstown Suns	Eastern League	Jerry Narron
A	Frederick Keys	Carolina League	Wally Moon
A	Kane County Cougars	Midwest League	Bob Miscik
Rookie	Bluefield Orioles	Appalachian League	Gus Gil
Rookie	GCL Orioles	Gulf Coast League	Ed Napoleon
