= Eddie Zosky =

American baseball player (born 1968)

- Shortstop
- Born: February 10, 1968 (age 58); Whittier, California, U.S.
- Batted: Right Threw: Right

MLB debut
- September 2, 1991, for the Toronto Blue Jays

Last MLB appearance
- October 1, 2000, for the Houston Astros

MLB statistics
- Batting average: .160
- Home runs: 0
- Runs batted in: 3
- Stats at Baseball Reference

Teams
- Toronto Blue Jays (1991–1992); Florida Marlins (1995); Milwaukee Brewers (1999); Houston Astros (2000)

Edward James Zosky (born February 10, 1968) is an American former professional baseball shortstop. He played in brief parts of five seasons in Major League Baseball, between 1991 and 2000, for the Toronto Blue Jays, Florida Marlins, Milwaukee Brewers and Houston Astros. He also played in the Baltimore Orioles, San Francisco Giants and Pittsburgh Pirates minor league systems.

Zosky was a collegiate star prior to playing professionally, becoming a member of Fresno State University's athletic Hall of Fame. He developed into a promising shortstop prospect for the Toronto Blue Jays in the early 1990s, being named their starting shortstop of the future multiple times, though injury problems and a lack of offense ended his hopes of stardom.

Zosky began his professional career in 1989 at the age of 21 and played for 12 seasons until the age of 32 in 2000. He spent most of his professional career in the minor leagues, spending parts of two seasons at the rookie level, part of one season at the Class A level, two full seasons at the Double-A level, parts of three seasons at the Triple-A level and seven full seasons at the Triple-A level. In total, he played in 1,056 minor league games, hitting .257 with 59 home runs and 407 RBI in 3,670 at-bats. Defensively, he spent 752 games at shortstop, 147 games at third base, 139 games at second base, two games at pitcher and one game in the outfield. As a pitcher, he threw 1 1/3 innings, striking out two batters and allowing one earned run, posting a 6.75 ERA.

He spent parts of five seasons at the Major League level – 1991, 1992, 1995, 1999 and 2000. He played in 44 big league games, collecting eight hits in 50 at-bats for a .160 batting average. Though he never hit a home run, he did collect two triples and a double, while driving three runs in. Defensively, he played 30 games at shortstop (starting eight of them), four games at third base and three games at second base. He committed two errors for a .967 fielding percentage, while turning eight double plays.

At all levels, both Major League and minor league, Zosky hit a combined .256 with 59 home runs and 410 RBI in 3,720 at-bats.

== Early and personal life ==
Zosky, who is Jewish, was born in Whittier, California to Ed and Yvonne Zosky and attended St. Paul High School in Santa Fe Springs, California, graduating in 1986.

== College career ==
After his graduation from high school, he attended Fresno State University, where he mostly played shortstop. He hit .292 in his first season with Fresno State University, earning second-team all-league honors. In May 1988, he suffered from mononucleosis and an ankle sprain, slightly shortening his sophomore season. In addition, Zosky was selected to try out for the United States Olympic baseball team in June of his sophomore season, along with teammates Tom Goodwin and John Salles. Though he was considered the front-runner for the shortstop position on the Olympic squad, he did not make the team. During his junior and final season at Fresno State University, Zosky was named Sporting News and Baseball America All-Americans after posting a .370 batting average. In addition, he was named first-team All Big West, along with teammates Bobby Jones, Tom Goodwin and Rich Crane.

== Draft ==
Zosky was drafted by Major League Baseball teams twice. Originally, he was drafted out of St. Paul High School by the New York Mets in the fifth round of the 1986 amateur draft, 128th overall. He did not sign, choosing to attend college instead.

He was next drafted by the Toronto Blue Jays 19th overall in the first round of the 1989 draft, out of Fresno State University. He was one of three Fresno State University alum drafted in the first round that year, the others being Steve Hosey (14th overall) and Tom Goodwin (22nd overall). It was the first time since the 1979 draft that three players were selected in the first round from the same school. The Blue Jays gave Zosky a $185,000 ($481,000 today) signing bonus.

== Professional career ==
=== Early minor league career ===
The initial plan was to have Zosky begin his professional career with the Dunedin Blue Jays of the Single-A Florida State League. However, citing poor performances by his current shortstops, Double-A manager Barry Foote had Zosky start with the Southern League Knoxville Blue Jays. He made his professional debut on July 4, collecting a hit and driving in Knoxville's lone run in his first professional game. He played 56 games at shortstop for Knoxville, batting .221 with a .303 slugging percentage.

In 1990, Zosky was ranked the third-best prospect in the Southern League. After he attended Major League spring training, he spent the entire season in the minor leagues, playing for the Knoxville Blue Jays and hitting .271 in 115 games – tying William Suero for the team lead in triples with seven.

Prior to the 1991 season, Baseball America named Zosky the 22nd-best prospect in professional baseball, ahead of Jeff Bagwell (32nd), Chipper Jones (49th) and Jim Thome (93rd). That season, he attended his second Major League spring training, and was in competition with Manuel Lee and Rene Gonzales for the starting shortstop position. However, after making six errors during the spring, he was deemed unready for Major League action and sent to minor league camp on April 1.

He spent most of the season with the Triple-A International League Syracuse Chiefs, hitting .264 with six home runs, 39 RBI and 69 runs. He led the team in both plate appearances and at bats, and, despite committing 24 errors in the field, he led league shortstops with 221 putouts, 371 assists and 88 double plays. His performance landed him a spot on the 1991 International League All-Star Team, as well as a September 1 promotion to the Major Leagues.

=== Major League debut ===
Though Zosky spent the majority of the 1991 season with the Syracuse Chiefs, he made his Major League Baseball debut that season as well. He appeared in his first big league game on September 2, against the Baltimore Orioles replacing shortstop Manuel Lee, who had been feeling dizzy and suffering from a stiff neck, in the top of the fourth inning. In the fifth inning, facing pitcher Dave Johnson in his first at-bat, Zosky singled to left field. Later in the game, he was replaced by Rance Mulliniks.

So anticipated was Zosky's debut that Toronto Star writer Dave Perkins compared Zosky's debut to Lou Gehrig in 1925, asking "Did Manuel Lee just become Manuel Pipp?" (in reference to Gehrig usurping Wally Pipp's first base position that season). The next day, September 3, he made his first Major League start, again against the Baltimore Orioles. Batting ninth in the starting lineup, he collected zero hits in three at-bats, striking out twice against pitchers Ben McDonald and Mike Flanagan.

He spent 18 games in total with the Toronto Blue Jays in 1991, batting .148 with two runs and two RBI in 27 at-bats. Though he did not hit a home run, two of his four hits were for extra bases—the first was a triple off of Bob Welch and the second was a double off of Denny Neagle. He also drove in his first career RBIs against Welch, scoring John Olerud and Candy Maldonado on the same play.

=== 1992–1994: Zosky's Blue Jays career ===
Prior to the 1992 minor league baseball season, Baseball America ranked Zosky as the 82nd best prospect in professional baseball. Though he was expected to unseat Manuel Lee as the starting shortstop for the 1992 Major League season, he began the year with the Triple-A Syracuse Chiefs after posting a batting average of .151 and committing five errors during spring training. Rather than giving Zosky the backup job, the Blue Jays gave it to non-roster invitee Alfredo Griffin, who had been signed previously.

He struggled early during the season with batting averages of .150 and .160 in April and May, respectively, and though he batted .350 in June, his season batting average was only .231. Following the conclusion of the 1992 minor league season in September, Zosky was promoted to the Toronto Blue Jays, with whom he appeared in eight games. He batted .286 in seven at-bats, with one of his two hits being a triple (which he hit off of José Mesa on September 14—exactly one year after his first career extra-base hit, which was also a triple). Following the 1992 regular season, Zosky played for the Tucson Javelinas in the newly formed Arizona Fall League, hitting .326.

As early as January 1993, Zosky was expected to be the Toronto Blue Jays' starting shortstop for the 1993 regular season. However, later that month Zosky was shut down due to a muscle problem in his throwing elbow. To provide insurance in case Zosky floundered, the Toronto Blue Jays signed veteran free agent Dick Schofield, who had played for the California Angels and New York Mets the previous season. They also re-signed Alfredo Griffin and traded Kelly Gruber and cash to the California Angels for Luis Sojo, who would provide even further insurance in case Zosky failed. Though Zosky was expected to be the starting shortstop earlier in the year, by February Schofield was the leading contender for the position. Due to his struggles in 1992 – not only did he hit .231, he also committed 27 errors – and his injuries, the Blue Jays began looking beyond Zosky as the future starting shortstop for the team, paying more attention to their other prospect Alex Gonzalez.

After undergoing a surgery on his bad elbow to remove a bone spur on March 16, Zosky's starting prospects dimmed even further – he was placed on the 15-day disabled list on March 26, 1993, later spending some time in extended spring training. He returned to the playing field in late July, and played in 33 minor league games – five in a rehabilitation stint with the Hagerstown Suns, for whom he hit .100 in 20 at-bats and 28 for the Syracuse Chiefs, for whom he hit .215 in 103 at-bats. Overall, he batted .195 with zero home runs and nine RBI, while committing five errors in the field. He did not play in the Major Leagues in 1993. Instead, Dick Schofield was the Opening Day starter, though Tony Fernández seized the starting job after his June 11 trade to the Blue Jays from the New York Mets. Following the 1993 season, he played for the Scottsdale Scorpions in the Arizona Fall League.

By 1994, Alex Gonzalez had all but replaced Zosky as the Blue Jays' shortstop of the future. Though he had some bright moments during that season's spring training, including a game-winning three-run home run in an exhibition game on March 23, Zosky had become relegated to back-up status as Dick Schofield was set to make another Opening Day start – this time as a placeholder for Gonzalez, rather than Zosky. As it turned out, Gonzalez won the starting shortstop job and was the Opening Day performer at that position. By April 28, however, Gonzalez was struggling, Schofield had retaken the starting shortstop position, and – because he was performing well with the Syracuse Chiefs – Zosky was back in the mix as a potential suitor for the position himself. Schofield retained a hold on the job, however, and Zosky spent the entire year in Triple-A with the Chiefs, batting .264 with seven home runs and 34 RBI in 85 games, rattling off a 16-game hitting streak at one point. Though he played a shortened season due to injury, he tied Robert Montalvo for the team lead in sacrifice hits with six. Despite hitting .264, his on-base percentage was only .287 as he walked only nine times in 284 at-bats. Though a shortstop by trade, he played more games at second base (41) than shortstop (34) that season.

=== Florida Marlins ===
On November 18, 1994, Zosky's Blue Jays career came to an end when he was traded to the Florida Marlins for a player to be named later, who ended up being minor league pitcher Scott Pace. That was the first trade ever made by new Blue Jays general manager Gord Ash, who replaced Pat Gillick following the 1994 season. Zosky made the Marlins Opening Day roster for the 1995 season and on April 29, he played in his first Major League game since October 4, 1992. Facing Trevor Wilson of the San Francisco Giants, Zosky singled in his first big league at-bat in over two seasons. He played the whole game, going 1-for-3 at the plate. Appearing in only six games at the Major League level in 1995 (with the single in his first at-bat his only big league hit), Zosky spent most of the year with the Triple-A International League's Charlotte Knights, to whom he was optioned after the Marlins cut their roster from 28 to 25 players on May 15. With Charlotte, he hit .247 with three home runs and 42 RBI in 92 games, walking only seven times in 312 at-bats. On October 16, he was granted free agency.

=== Baltimore Orioles and San Francisco Giants ===
On January 24, 1996, Zosky signed a contract with the Baltimore Orioles. He spent most of the season with the Orioles' Triple-A International League affiliate, the Rochester Red Wings, though he also spent a game with their rookie-level affiliate, the Gulf Coast League Orioles. That season, he hit a combined .257 with three home runs, 34 RBI and a career-high 23 doubles. With eight double plays grounded into, he tied Joe Hall for the Red Wings team lead. On October 15, he was granted free agency by the Orioles.

On November 25, 1996, the San Francisco signed Zosky to a contract, making him a non-roster invitee to spring training. He was cut from the big league squad on March 17 and was assigned to minor league camp the following day. He then spent the entire 1997 season in Triple-A, playing for the Pacific Coast League's Phoenix Firebirds. He began the season with a bang, hitting a grand slam on April 6 against the Colorado Springs Sky Sox. In total, he played in 86 games that season, hitting .278 with nine home runs and 45 RBI. Defensively, he spent more games at third base (42) than at his natural shortstop position (30). On October 15, 1997, he was granted free agency by the Giants.

=== Milwaukee Brewers ===
On December 17, 1997, the Milwaukee Brewers signed Zosky as a free agent, inviting him to spring training. By the second week of the 1998 season's spring training, it looked as though Zosky would earn a spot on the Brewers' 25-man roster – he would eventually be cut after the Brewers purchased outfielder Eric Owens from the Florida Marlins, however, and spend the entire season with the Triple-A Louisville Redbirds. That season, he hit .245 with eight home runs and 35 RBI in 90 games. He pitched for the first time in his career that season as well, appearing as a reliever in one game, allowing one hit and striking out the second batter he faced. He was granted free agency by the Brewers on October 15, but was re-signed on December 18 and given an invite to spring training.

Like in previous years, Zosky began the 1999 season in Triple-A, playing for the Louisville RiverBats. He remained with the RiverBats through late July, though after catcher Bobby Hughes went on the 15-day disabled list, the Brewers purchased Zosky's contract and brought him up to the Major League team. He made his first Major League appearance since May 14, 1995, when, on August 1, 1999, he pinch hit for Brewers pitcher Reggie Harris in the sixth inning and remained in the game, replacing Ronnie Belliard at second base. In his first Major League game in over four seasons, Zosky went 1-for-2 at the plate, collecting a single in his second at-bat off of Montreal Expos pitcher Dan Smith. Just a few days later, on August 5, he was assigned back to Louisville. He earned yet another promotion to the Major Leagues on September 5 with starting shortstop Mark Loretta injured and pitcher Chad Fox placed on the 60-day disabled list. In total, he played in eight games for the Brewers that season, collecting one hit in seven at-bats for a .143 batting average. He had perhaps the best minor league season of his career in 1999, as he hit .294 with 12 home runs and 47 RBI (all career-highs). Following the season, on October 7, he refused a minor league assignment and became a free agent.

=== Pittsburgh Pirates and Houston Astros ===
On January 18, 2000, the Pittsburgh Pirates signed Zosky to a minor league contract, also offering him an invitation to spring training. On March 15, the Pirates assigned him to minor league camp. He began the 2000 season in the Pirates minor league system, playing in 53 games for the Triple-A Nashville Sounds (with whom he hit .221 with two home runs and 16 RBI) and in eight games for the rookie-level GCL Pirates (with whom he hit .333 with six doubles in 30 at-bats).

On August 23, he was traded to the Houston Astros for a player to be named later. He began his stint in the Astros organization in the minor leagues, playing in 11 games with the Triple-A New Orleans Zephyrs and hitting .273 in 33 at-bats. On September 12, the Astros purchased his contract, bringing him up to the Major League squad. The Astros used him sporadically after his promotion as he played in four games with them, collecting zero hits in four at-bats. His final appearance with the Astros, on October 1, would also be the final game of his professional career. On October 11, he became a free agent. No team ended up signing him. In the minor leagues that season, he hit a combined .247 with two home runs and 22 RBI in 72 games.

== Jersey numbers and salaries ==
Year	Team	Jersey number(s)	Salary
1991	Toronto Blue Jays	1	Unknown
1992	Toronto Blue Jays	1	$109,000
1995	Florida Marlins	16	Unknown
1999	Milwaukee Brewers	45, 47	Unknown
2000	Houston Astros	23	Unknown

== See also ==
- List of Jewish Major League Baseball players
