= Glenallen Hill =

American baseball player and coach (born 1965)

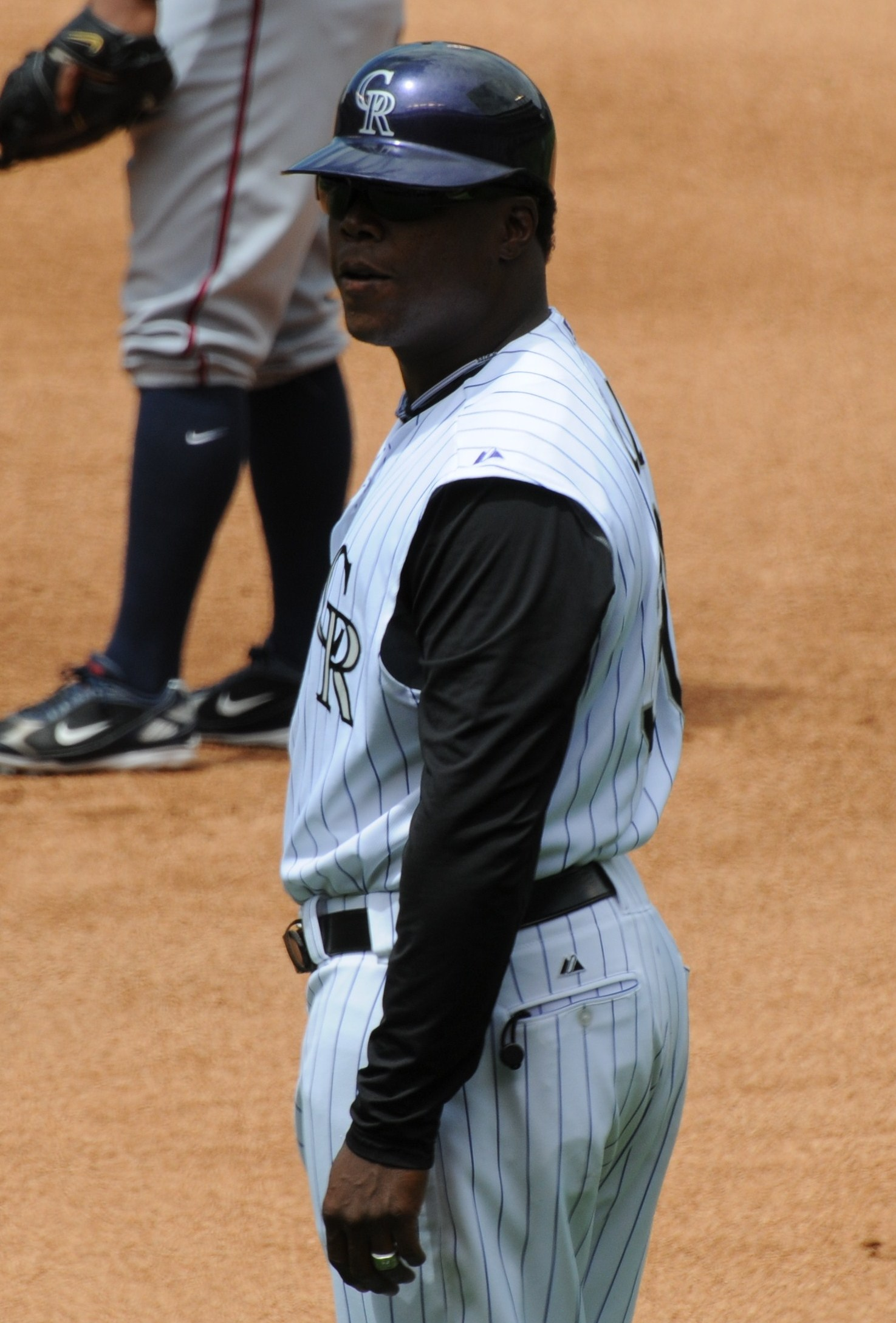
- Hill in 2008
- Outfielder
- Born: March 22, 1965 (age 61); Santa Cruz, California, U.S.
- Batted: Right Threw: Right

MLB debut
- July 31, 1989, for the Toronto Blue Jays

Last MLB appearance
- May 31, 2001, for the Anaheim Angels

MLB statistics
- Batting average: .271
- Home runs: 186
- Runs batted in: 586
- Stats at Baseball Reference

Teams
- As player: Toronto Blue Jays (1989–1991); Cleveland Indians (1991–1993); Chicago Cubs (1993–1994); San Francisco Giants (1995–1997); Seattle Mariners (1998); Chicago Cubs (1998–2000); New York Yankees (2000); Anaheim Angels (2001); As coach: Colorado Rockies (2007–2012)

Career highlights and awards
- World Series champion (2000)

Glenallen Hill (born March 22, 1965) is an American former Major League Baseball outfielder and coach. He played with the Toronto Blue Jays (1989–1991), Cleveland Indians (1991–1993), Chicago Cubs (1993–1994, 1998–2000), San Francisco Giants (1995–1997), Seattle Mariners (1998), New York Yankees (2000), and Anaheim Angels (2001) during his 13-year career. With the Yankees, he won the 2000 World Series over the New York Mets and was named the American League Player of the Month in August 2000. He was the first designated hitter used by a National League team in a regular season game with the Giants in 1997.

Hill coached and managed in the Colorado Rockies organization beginning in 2003. He was the team's first base coach from 2007 to 2012, after which he managed in Triple-A through 2019.

== Early life ==
Hill was born in Santa Cruz, California. His mother, Francile McDuffie-Hill, worked at Dominican Hospital. His father worked as a trucker and later in construction.

Hill graduated from Santa Cruz High School in 1983 where he was a three-sport star. He committed to attend Arizona State University where he had received scholarship offers to play both baseball and football.

== Playing career ==
=== Toronto Blue Jays ===
==== Draft and minor leagues (1983–89) ====
The Toronto Blue Jays drafted Hill in the 1983 Major League Baseball (MLB) draft, in the ninth round and 219th overall. In 1986, he was named a Southern League All-Star and MVP of the Knoxville Blue Jays. In 1989, he was named an International League All-Star and the MVP of the Syracuse Chiefs.

==== Major leagues (1989–91) ====
Hill made his major league debut on July 31, 1989, with the Blue Jays. He collected his first major league hit that night, an RBI single off of Andy Hawkins of the New York Yankees. In 19 MLB games that year, he collected 15 hits including his first career home run and seven runs batted in. His play that season allowed him to remain with the team for the 1990 season, where he hit .231 over 84 games including 12 home runs and 32 runs batted in. In 1991, he played in 35 games for the Blue Jays, batting .253.

=== Cleveland Indians (1991–93) ===
On June 27, 1991, Toronto traded Hill with Denis Boucher, Mark Whiten, and cash to the Cleveland Indians for Tom Candiotti and Turner Ward. Hill played in 37 games for the Indians in 1991, collecting 32 hits while driving in 14 runs. In his sole full season in Cleveland in 1992, Hill played in 102 games, with 18 home runs and 49 runs batted in (RBI) (then career-highs). Hill played in 66 games for the Indians in 1993 and hit only .224.

=== Chicago Cubs (1993–94) ===
Cleveland traded Hill to the Chicago Cubs on August 19, 1993, for fellow outfielder Candy Maldonado. Hill played in 31 games for the Cubs in his first season, hitting .345 with 22 RBI. In 1994, he played in 89 games and clubbed 10 home runs while collecting 38 RBI before the 1994–95 MLB strike cancelled the remainder of the season. On April 7, 1995, he was granted free agency.

=== San Francisco Giants (1995–97) ===
Hill signed with the Giants on April 9, 1995, where he hit .264 with 24 home runs and 86 RBI along with a career-high 25 stolen bases. Hill suffered a dislocation fracture of his left wrist while diving for a sinking liner on May 26, 1996. He was out of action until August 5, playing in only 98 games while hitting .280 with 19 homers and 67 RBI. In 1997, he hit .261 with 11 home runs and 64 RBI. Hill was the first National League (NL) player to serve as a designated hitter in regular season play, doing so on June 12, 1997, in the first-ever game in interleague play as the Giants faced the Texas Rangers at The Ballpark at Arlington. That year, he played in his first postseason games against the Marlins. He went 0-for-7 with two walks. Following the Giants defeat, Hill elected free agency on October 29.

=== Seattle Mariners (1998) ===
Hill signed with the Mariners on January 8, 1998, for $300,000. He hit .290 with 12 homers and 33 RBI before being placed on waivers due to his poor defense.

=== Chicago Cubs (second stint) (1998–2000) ===
The Cubs selected Hill off waivers on July 6, 1998. In 48 games, Hill hit .351 with eight home runs and 23 RBI. Hill also played in one game during the 1998 NL Division Series where he was one for three with a run batted in and a stolen base. He was granted free agency on October 23 and re-signed with the Cubs on December 7. Hill hit .300 with 20 home runs and 55 RBI during the 1999 season. He played in 64 games in 2000 and hit .262 with 11 home runs. On April 29, 2000, Hill became the first player to hit home runs against all 30 MLB teams, hitting a solo shot against the Arizona Diamondbacks. On May 11, Hill became the first, and thus far only player to hit a home run on the three-story residential building across the street from Wrigley Field at 1032 W. Waveland Ave. The shot came off Steve Woodard in the second inning of the Cubs' 14–8 loss to the Milwaukee Brewers.

=== New York Yankees (2000) ===
Chicago traded Hill to the Yankees on July 21, 2000, for pitchers Ben Ford and Oswaldo Mairena. Hill was named the AL Player of the Month in August, batting .411 with 10 home runs. He played in 40 games for the Yankees in his final full MLB season, mostly as a designated hitter. He hit 16 home runs in a rotating designated hitter role and was added to the postseason roster. He played in four games in the American League (AL) Division Series against the Oakland Athletics and was 1-for-12 with 2 RBI. In the AL Championship Series against the Mariners, Hill played in two games and went 0-for-2, striking out in both of his plate appearances. In the World Series, Hill played in three games, going 0-for-3. He earned a World Series ring as the Yankees defeated the New York Mets in five games.

=== Anaheim Angels (2001) ===
On March 28, 2001, Hill was traded to the Angels for minor-leaguer Darren Blakely. He appeared in only 16 MLB games that year, hitting .136 before being released on June 1. He retired after the season.

In a 13-year major league career, Hill compiled a lifetime batting average of .271, hitting 186 home runs and driving in 586 RBIs in 1,162 games. As a pinch hitter, Hill had a .287 lifetime average with 13 home runs.

== Steroid allegations ==
In December 2007, Hill was included in the Mitchell Report in which it was alleged that he had used performance-enhancing drugs during his career. In the report, Kirk Radomski alleged that he met Hill at a social function in 2000 during which they discussed Hill's dissatisfaction with the results from his use of HGH. Radomski claims he sent Hill a complimentary bottle of HGH, which Hill tried — then later expressed his satisfaction with the results. Radomski stated that Hill purchased two kits of HGH from him and provided a photocopy of a cancelled check from Hill for $3,200. Hill's phone number and address were also included in Radomski's address book.

As an employee of MLB, Hill was required to submit to an interview by the Mitchell investigators. During the interview, Hill denied having used the HGH provided by Radomski, citing that he had been suffering from marital stresses at the time. He stated that this had been a one-time purchase and that he had never used performance-enhancing substances. He admitted that the drugs had stayed in his possession until 2007 when he discovered them while unpacking from a move. Hill claimed that he couldn't remember other players with whom he may have discussed steroid use and noted that his lawyer had warned him that naming players would hurt his career.

On December 20, 2007, Hill was also named in Jason Grimsley's unsealed affidavit as a user of steroids. Hill and Grimsley were teammates on the 2000 New York Yankees. In a February 2008 joint press release with Matt Herges issued by the Colorado Rockies, Hill admitted to having used steroids.

== Coaching career ==
In 2003, Hill began coaching in the Colorado Rockies minor league system before being named first base coach following the 2006 season.

In 2007, Hill started wearing a helmet while coaching first base following the death of Tulsa Drillers (a Rockies minor-league affiliate) first base coach and former major leaguer Mike Coolbaugh from injuries sustained when hit in the head by a batted ball. Hill and Oakland's Rene Lachemann were the only coaches at the major league level to do so that year. Hill quickly became an advocate for all first base coaches to wear helmets. In 2007, Joe Garagiola Jr., MLB's vice president of baseball operations, adopted a rule requiring all professional baseball base coaches to wear helmets beginning in 2008. Hill remained first base coach of the Rockies through the 2012 season.

Hill managed the Colorado Springs Sky Sox during the 2013 and 2014 seasons while the Sky Sox were the Triple-A affiliates of the Rockies. He was named the manager of the Albuquerque Isotopes on January 8, 2015, after the Rockies changed their Triple-A affiliate from Colorado Springs to Albuquerque . Hill left Albuquerque after the 2019 season.

== Personal life ==
In July 1990, Hill was put on the disabled list after suffering injuries during a sleepwalking incident. Hill, who it was claimed at the time was an arachnophobe, had a nightmare about being attacked by spiders and in the process went sleepwalking to try to get away. When he awoke from the incident, he had cuts on his hands and feet due to walking across shards of broken glass from a table he knocked over and also fell down a flight of stairs. His teammates began calling him "Spiderman" afterwards. In April 2017, as manager of the Albuquerque Isotopes, he allowed a giant pink-toed tarantula to crawl on his arm during a team media day to demonstrate he was not arachnophobic. A photograph taken that day was used on a 2017 Albuquerque Isotopes Choice baseball card.

In 1995, Hill married his wife, the daughter of sociologist G. William Domhoff. They have two children. Their son, Glenallen Jr., was drafted by the Arizona Diamondbacks in the fourth round of the 2019 MLB draft. Hill had been married previously. Hill's mother died in 2015.

== See also ==
- List of Major League Baseball players named in the Mitchell Report

Preceded by Johnny Damon	American League Player of the Month; August 2000	Succeeded by Jason Giambi
Preceded by Chad Kreuter	Modesto Nuts Manager; 2006	Succeeded by Jerry Weinstein
Preceded by Dave Collins	Colorado Rockies first base coach 2007–2012	Succeeded by Rene Lachemann
Preceded by Stu Cole	Colorado Springs Sky Sox Manager; 2013–2014	Succeeded by Rick Sweet
Preceded by Damon Berryhill	Albuquerque Isotopes Manager; 2015–2019	Succeeded by Warren Schaeffer
