= 1991 New York Yankees season =

Season for the Major League Baseball team the New York Yankees

1991 New York Yankees
- League: American League
- Division: East
- Ballpark: Yankee Stadium
- City: New York City
- Record: 71–91 (.438)
- Divisional place: 5th
- Owners: George Steinbrenner and Robert Nederlander (managing general partner)
- General managers: Gene Michael
- Managers: Stump Merrill
- Television: WPIX (Phil Rizzuto, Tom Seaver, Bobby Murcer); MSG (Tony Kubek, Dewayne Staats, Al Trautwig)
- Radio: WABC (AM) (John Sterling, Joe Angel)

The 1991 New York Yankees season was the 89th season for the Yankees. The team finished with a record of 71–91 finishing 20 games behind the Toronto Blue Jays. New York was managed by Stump Merrill. The Yankees played at Yankee Stadium.

== Offseason ==
- October 5, 1990: Wayne Tolleson was released by the New York Yankees.
- November 19, 1990: Tim Leary was signed as a free agent with the New York Yankees.
- December 3, 1990: Frank Seminara was drafted by the San Diego Padres from the New York Yankees in the 1990 rule 5 draft.
- December 31, 1990: Scott Sanderson was purchased by the New York Yankees from the Oakland Athletics.
- January 13, 1991: Rick Cerone was released by the New York Yankees.
- March 19, 1991: Torey Lovullo was traded by the Detroit Tigers to the New York Yankees for Mark Leiter.

== Regular season ==
- Steve Sax led the Yankees with a .304 batting average, 198 hits, 85 runs, and 38 doubles.
- April 11, 1991 – Roberto Kelly had 5 RBI in a game versus the Detroit Tigers.
- June 23, 1991 – Roberto Kelly had 5 hits in a game versus the eventual World Champion Minnesota Twins.

=== Season standings ===
AL East
Team	W	L	Pct.	GB	Home	Road
Toronto Blue Jays	91	71	.562	—	46‍–‍35	45‍–‍36
Boston Red Sox	84	78	.519	7	43‍–‍38	41‍–‍40
Detroit Tigers	84	78	.519	7	49‍–‍32	35‍–‍46
Milwaukee Brewers	83	79	.512	8	43‍–‍37	40‍–‍42
New York Yankees	71	91	.438	20	39‍–‍42	32‍–‍49
Baltimore Orioles	67	95	.414	24	33‍–‍48	34‍–‍47
Cleveland Indians	57	105	.352	34	30‍–‍52	27‍–‍53

=== Record vs. opponents ===
1991 American League record Sources:
Team	BAL	BOS	CAL	CWS	CLE	DET	KC	MIL	MIN	NYY	OAK	SEA	TEX	TOR
Baltimore	—	8–5	6–6	4–8	7–6	5–8	4–8	3–10	4–8	5–8	3–9	4–8	9–3	5–8
Boston	5–8	—	4–8	7–5	9–4	5–8	7–5	7–6	3–9	6–7	8–4	9–3	5–7	9–4
California	6–6	8–4	—	8–5	7–5	5–7	9–4	6–6	8–5	6–6	1–12	6–7	5–8	6–6
Chicago	8–4	5–7	5–8	—	6–6	4–8	7–6	7–5	8–5	8–4	7–6	7–6	8–5	7–5
Cleveland	6–7	4–9	5–7	6–6	—	7–6	4–8	5–8	2–10	6–7	5–7	2–10	4–8	1–12
Detroit	8–5	8–5	7–5	8–4	6–7	—	8–4	4–9	4–8	8–5	4–8	8–4	6–6	5–8
Kansas City	8–4	5–7	4–9	6–7	8–4	4–8	—	9–3	6–7	7–5	6–7	7–6	7–6	5–7
Milwaukee	10–3	6–7	6–6	5–7	8–5	9–4	3–9	—	6–6	6–7	8–4	3–9	7–5	6–7
Minnesota	8–4	9–3	5–8	5–8	10–2	8–4	7–6	6–6	—	10–2	8–5	9–4	6–7	4–8
New York	8–5	7–6	6–6	4–8	7–6	5–8	5–7	7–6	2–10	—	6–6	3–9	5–7	6–7
Oakland	9–3	4–8	12–1	6–7	7–5	8–4	7–6	4–8	5–8	6–6	—	6–7	4–9	6–6
Seattle	8–4	3–9	7–6	6–7	10–2	4–8	6–7	9–3	4–9	9–3	7–6	—	5–8	5–7
Texas	3–9	7–5	8–5	5–8	8–4	6–6	6–7	5–7	7–6	7–5	9–4	8–5	—	6–6
Toronto	8–5	4–9	6–6	5–7	12–1	8–5	7–5	7–6	8–4	7–6	6–6	7–5	6–6	—

=== Detailed records ===
American League
Opponent	W	L	WP	RS	RA
AL East
Baltimore Orioles	8	5	0.615	59	55
Boston Red Sox	7	6	0.538	55	53
Cleveland Indians	7	6	0.538	54	42
Detroit Tigers	5	8	0.385	69	77
Milwaukee Brewers	7	6	0.538	61	64
New York Yankees					
Toronto Blue Jays	6	7	0.462	50	57
Total	40	38	0.513	348	348
AL West
California Angels	6	6	0.500	48	64
Chicago White Sox	4	8	0.333	52	77
Kansas City Royals	5	7	0.417	46	59
Minnesota Twins	2	10	0.167	46	64
Oakland Athletics	6	6	0.500	56	59
Seattle Mariners	3	9	0.250	32	43
Texas Rangers	5	7	0.417	46	63
Total	31	53	0.369	326	429
Season Total	71	91	0.438	674	777

Month	Games	Won	Lost	Win %	RS	RA
April	17	6	11	0.353	79	93
May	27	14	13	0.519	111	107
June	27	13	14	0.481	123	122
July	26	13	13	0.500	109	121
August	31	12	19	0.387	137	183
September	28	9	19	0.321	85	126
October	6	4	2	0.667	30	25
Total	162	71	91	0.438	674	777

	Games	Won	Lost	Win %	RS	RA
Home	81	39	42	0.481	356	380
Away	81	32	49	0.395	318	397
Total	162	71	91	0.438	674	777

=== Notable transactions ===
- April 1, 1991: Steve Balboni was released by the New York Yankees.
- April 5, 1991: Scott Lusader was selected off waivers by the New York Yankees from the Detroit Tigers.
- May 9, 1991: Andy Hawkins was released by the New York Yankees.
- May 17, 1991: Mike Blowers was traded by the New York Yankees to the Seattle Mariners for a player to be named later and cash. The Seattle Mariners sent Jim Blueberg (minors) (June 22, 1991) to the New York Yankees to complete the trade.
- May 25, 1991: Andy Pettite was signed by the New York Yankees as an amateur free agent.

==== Draft picks ====
- With the first overall pick in the MLB draft, the New York Yankees selected Brien Taylor. He was a left-handed pitcher from Beaufort, North Carolina who competed at East Carteret High School.

===== Notable draft picks =====
Round	Pick	Player	Position	Amateur Club
5	126	Lyle Mouton	OF	Louisiana State University
9	230	Keith Garagozzo	LHP	University of Delaware

=== Roster ===
1991 New York Yankees
Roster
Pitchers: 25 Greg Cadaret; 51 Chuck Cary; 60 Darrin Chapin; 28 Dave Eiland; 26 Steve Farr; 35 Lee Guetterman; 42,57 John Habyan; 40 Andy Hawkins; 57 Steve Howe; 43 Jeff Johnson; 40 Scott Kamieniecki; 54 Tim Leary; 50 Alan Mills; 45 Rich Monteleone; 34 Pascual Pérez; 33 Eric Plunk; 21 Scott Sanderson; 41 Wade Taylor; 36 Mike Witt	Catchers: 53 Bob Geren; 38 Matt Nokes; 48 John Ramos; Infielders: 14 Mike Blowers; 20 Álvaro Espinoza; 14 Pat Kelly; 12 Jim Leyritz; 13,43 Torey Lovullo; 23 Don Mattingly; 12 Carlos Rodríguez; 6 Steve Sax; 18 Randy Velarde	Outfielders: 29 Jesse Barfield; 27 Mel Hall; 36 Mike Humphreys; 39 Roberto Kelly; 17 Scott Lusader; 31 Hensley Meulens; 17 Pat Sheridan; 51 Bernie Williams; Other Positions: 24 Kevin Maas	Manager: 22 Stump Merrill; Coaches: 52 Mark Connor; 44 Mike Ferraro; 47 Marc Hill; 46 Frank Howard; 2 Graig Nettles (first base); 48,11 Buck Showalter (third base)

== Player stats ==
=== Starters by position ===
Note: Pos = Position; G = Games played; AB = At bats; H = Hits; Avg. = Batting average; HR = Home runs; RBI = Runs batted in

Pos	Player	G	AB	H	Avg.	HR	RBI
C	Matt Nokes	135	456	122	.268	24	77
1B	Don Mattingly	152	587	169	.288	9	68
2B	Steve Sax	158	652	198	.304	10	56
3B	Pat Kelly	96	298	72	.242	3	23
SS	Álvaro Espinoza	148	480	123	.256	5	33
LF	Mel Hall	141	492	140	.285	19	80
CF	Bernie Williams	85	320	76	.238	3	34
RF	Jesse Barfield	84	284	64	.225	17	48
DH	Kevin Maas	148	500	110	.220	23	63

==== Other batters ====
Note: G = Games played; AB = At bats; H = Hits; Avg.= Batting average; HR = Home runs; RBI = Runs batted in

Player	G	AB	H	Avg.	HR	RBI
Roberto Kelly	126	486	130	.267	20	69
Hensley Meulens	96	288	64	.222	6	29
Randy Velarde	80	184	45	.245	1	15
Bob Geren	64	128	28	.219	2	12
Pat Sheridan	62	113	23	.204	4	7
Jim Leyritz	32	77	14	.182	0	4
Torey Lovullo	22	51	9	.176	0	2
Mike Humphreys	25	40	8	.200	0	3
Carlos Rodríguez	15	37	7	.189	0	2
Mike Blowers	15	35	7	.200	1	1
John Ramos	10	26	8	.308	0	3
Scott Lusader	11	7	1	.143	0	1

=== Starting pitchers ===
Note: G = Games pitched; IP = Innings pitched; W = Wins; L = Losses; ERA = Earned run average; SO = Strikeouts

Player	G	IP	W	L	ERA	SO
Scott Sanderson	34	208.0	16	10	3.81	130
Jeff Johnson	23	127.0	6	11	5.95	62
Wade Taylor	23	116.1	7	12	6.27	72
Pascual Pérez	14	73.2	2	4	3.18	41
Dave Eiland	18	72.2	2	5	5.33	18
Scott Kamieniecki	9	55.1	4	4	3.90	34
Chuck Cary	10	53.1	1	6	5.91	34
Andy Hawkins	4	12.2	0	2	9.95	5
Mike Witt	2	5.1	0	1	10.13	0

==== Other pitchers ====
Note: G = Games pitched; IP = Innings pitched; W = Wins; L = Losses; ERA = Earned run average; SO = Strikeouts

Player	G	IP	W	L	ERA	SO
Tim Leary	28	120.2	4	10	6.49	83
Eric Plunk	43	111.2	2	5	4.76	103
Alan Mills	6	16.1	1	1	4.41	11

===== Relief pitchers =====
Note: G = Games pitched; W = Wins; L = Losses; SV = Saves; ERA = Earned run average; SO = Strikeouts

Player	G	W	L	SV	ERA	SO
Steve Farr	60	5	5	23	2.19	60
Greg Cadaret	68	8	6	3	3.62	105
John Habyan	66	4	2	2	2.30	70
Lee Guetterman	64	3	4	6	3.68	35
Steve Howe	37	3	1	3	1.68	34
Rich Monteleone	26	3	1	0	3.64	34
Darrin Chapin	3	0	1	0	5.06	5
Álvaro Espinoza	1	0	0	0	0.00	0

== Farm system ==
Level	Team	League	Manager
AAA	Columbus Clippers	International League	Rick Down
AA	Albany-Colonie Yankees	Eastern League	Dan Radison
A	Prince William Cannons	Carolina League	Mike Hart
A	Fort Lauderdale Yankees	Florida State League	Glenn Sherlock
A	Greensboro Hornets	South Atlantic League	Trey Hillman
A-Short Season	Oneonta Yankees	New York–Penn League	Jack Gillis
Rookie	GCL Yankees	Gulf Coast League	Ken Dominguez

LEAGUE CHAMPIONS: Columbus, Albany-Colonie
