= Rob Ducey =

Canadian baseball player and coach (born 1965)

- Outfielder
- Born: May 24, 1965 (age 61); Toronto, Ontario, Canada
- Batted: Left Threw: Right

Professional debut
- MLB: May 1, 1987, for the Toronto Blue Jays
- NPB: April 1, 1995, for the Nippon-Ham Fighters

Last appearance
- NPB: September 24, 1996, for the Nippon-Ham Fighters
- MLB: July 22, 2001, for the Montreal Expos

MLB statistics
- Batting average: .242
- Home runs: 31
- Runs batted in: 146

NPB statistics
- Batting average: .248
- Home runs: 51
- Runs batted in: 120
- Stats at Baseball Reference

Teams
- Toronto Blue Jays (1987–1992); California Angels (1992); Texas Rangers (1993–1994); Nippon-Ham Fighters (1995–1996); Seattle Mariners (1997–1998); Philadelphia Phillies (1999–2000); Toronto Blue Jays (2000); Philadelphia Phillies (2000–2001); Montreal Expos (2001)

Member of the Canadian

Baseball Hall of Fame
- Induction: 2013

Robert Thomas Ducey (born May 24, 1965) is a Canadian former professional baseball outfielder and coach who played for six teams in Major League Baseball (MLB).

== Career ==
Ducey was raised in Cambridge, Ontario and graduated from Seminole Community College.

The Toronto Blue Jays signed Ducey as a free agent in 1984. He debuted in MLB with the Blue Jays in 1987 and played with the team until the end of July 1992. He then played in MLB for the California Angels (1992), Texas Rangers (1993–1994), Seattle Mariners (1997–1998), Philadelphia Phillies (1999–2000, 2000-2001), and Montreal Expos (2001), with a brief return to Toronto in 2000. He ended his 13-year major league career with a .242 batting average and 31 home runs in 703 games. He also played for the Nippon-Ham Fighters in Nippon Professional Baseball in 1995 and 1996, hitting 51 home runs, topping his 31 home runs in MLB.

Ducey was part of a major league anomaly in 2000, when he was traded by the Phillies to the Blue Jays on July 26 for minor league pitcher John Sneed, and was then traded by the Blue Jays back to the Phillies on August 7 for Mickey Morandini.

Ducey served as a designated hitter for Canada in the 2004 Summer Olympics, which finished in fourth place. As a result, he became the first Canadian to have played for two Canadian MLB teams, the Expos and Blue Jays, and the Canadian Olympic team. Matt Stairs, Denis Boucher, and Shawn Hill are the only other ballplayers to achieve such distinction.

Subsequently, Ducey spent one year each in the New York Yankees' and Expos organizations as a minor league hitting coach, before being hired in 2006 by the Blue Jays as a talent scout. His responsibilities included covering both the major and minor leagues, as well as spring training camp before moving to the Pacific Rim department. In October 2009, he was dismissed by then-new Jays general manager Alex Anthopoulos when coverage of Asia was not a priority for the organization.

Ducey was hired to scout for the Tampa Bay Rays in the 2011 season, then joined the Phillies minor league system in 2014, again serving as a hitting coach through 2017. In 2020, Ducey was the hitting coach for the Fubon Guardians of the Chinese Professional Baseball League (CPBL).

Ducey also coached Canada in the 2006 World Baseball Classic, 2008 Olympics, and 2015 WBSC Premier12.

== Awards ==
In 1986, Ducey won the Tip O'Neill Award, given annually to the top Canadian baseball player. He was inducted in the Canadian Baseball Hall of Fame in 2013. When he was inducted, Ducey joined Terry Puhl and Larry Walker as the only Canadian baseball players to achieve both of those milestones. Corey Koskie, Jason Bay, Ryan Dempster, Justin Morneau, and Russell Martin have since garnered both honors.

Ducey was also inducted into the Cambridge Sports Hall of Fame in 2006.

== Personal life ==
Ducey lives in Tarpon Springs, Florida, with his wife Yanitza and their sons Thomas and Aaron and their daughter Jenaka.

In 2021, Ducey began working as a life insurance agent in Florida.

== See also ==
- List of Major League Baseball players from Canada
