= Bruce Egloff =

American baseball player (born 1965)

- Pitcher
- Born: April 10, 1965 (age 60); Denver, Colorado, U.S.
- Batted: Right Threw: Right

MLB debut
- April 13, 1991, for the Cleveland Indians

Last MLB appearance
- May 13, 1991, for the Cleveland Indians

MLB statistics
- Win–loss record: 0-0
- Earned run average: 4.76
- Strikeouts: 8
- Stats at Baseball Reference

Teams
- Cleveland Indians (1991)

Bruce Egloff (Born April 10, 1965) is an American former professional baseball pitcher in the late 1980s and early 1990s. He played at East High School (Denver), Merced Junior College, and UC-Santa Barbara, and was drafted by the Cleveland Indians in 1986. Egloff pitched mostly in the minor leagues and he struggled with injuries throughout his career, including a three-times-torn rotator cuff and a broken right hand. He missed the entire 1992 regular baseball season while recovering from surgery to fuse two of his cervical vertebrae.

After 1992, he appeared in the California Angels minor league system but retired at the end of the 1993 season rather than undergo further surgery to prolong his playing career.

Egloff later worked as a minor-league pitching coach in the Detroit Tigers organization.
