= Bob MacDonald (baseball) =

American baseball player (born 1965)

- Pitcher
- Born: April 27, 1965 (age 59); East Orange, New Jersey, U.S.
- Batted: Left Threw: Left

Professional debut
- MLB: August 14, 1990, for the Toronto Blue Jays
- NPB: 1997, for the Hanshin Tigers

Last appearance
- MLB: June 7, 1996, for the New York Mets
- NPB: 1997, for the Hanshin Tigers

Career statistics
- Win–loss record: 8–9
- Earned run average: 4.34
- Strikeouts: 142
- Stats at Baseball Reference

Teams
- Toronto Blue Jays (1990–1992); Detroit Tigers (1993); New York Yankees (1995); New York Mets (1996); Hanshin Tigers (1997)

Robert Joseph MacDonald (born April 27, 1965) is an American former professional baseball pitcher. He played in Major League Baseball (MLB) for the Toronto Blue Jays, Detroit Tigers, New York Yankees, and New York Mets. MacDonald also played in Nippon Professional Baseball (NPB) for the Hanshin Tigers.

== Career ==
MacDonald went to college at Rutgers University, and was drafted by the Blue Jays in the 19th round of the 1987 amateur draft. MacDonald played his first American professional season with their Rookie league Medicine Hat Blue Jays, Class A (Short Season) St. Catharines Blue Jays, and Class A Myrtle Beach Blue Jays in 1987, and his last with the Mets and their Triple-A Norfolk Tides in 1996. In 1997, he played in Japan for the Hanshin Tigers.

MacDonald manages a semi-pro slow pitch softball team in Clearwater, Florida.
