= Jeff Carter (pitcher) =

American baseball player (born 1964)

- Pitcher
- Born: December 3, 1964 (age 61); Tampa, Florida, U.S.
- Batted: Right Threw: Right

MLB debut
- July 31, 1991, for the Chicago White Sox

Last MLB appearance
- October 3, 1991, for the Chicago White Sox

MLB statistics
- Win–loss record: 0–1
- Earned run average: 5.25
- Strikeouts: 2
- Stats at Baseball Reference

Teams
- Chicago White Sox (1991)

Jeffrey Allen Carter (born December 3, 1964) is an American former Major League Baseball pitcher who played baseball at the University of Tampa. He played during one season at the major league level for the Chicago White Sox. He was drafted by the Montreal Expos in the 19th round of the 1987 amateur draft. Carter played his first professional season with their Class A (Short Season) Jamestown Expos in 1987, and split his last season between the White Sox's Double-A (Birmingham Barons) and Triple-A (Nashville Sounds) affiliates in 1993.
