= William Suero =

Dominican baseball player

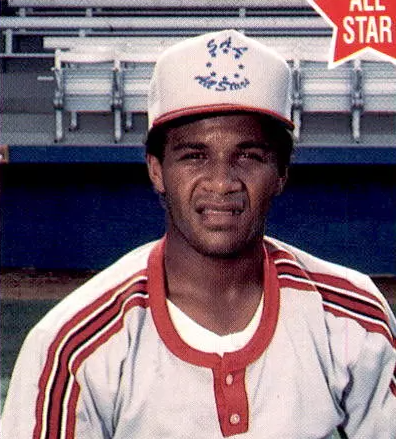
- Suero in 1988
- Second baseman
- Born: November 7, 1966; Santo Domingo, Dominican Republic
- Died: November 30, 1995 (aged 29); Santo Domingo, Dominican Republic
- Batted: Right Threw: Right

MLB debut
- April 9, 1992, for the Milwaukee Brewers

Last MLB appearance
- July 19, 1993, for the Milwaukee Brewers

MLB statistics
- Batting average: .233
- Home runs: 0
- Runs batted in: 0

CPBL statistics
- Batting average: .200
- Home runs: 3
- Runs batted in: 13
- Stats at Baseball Reference

Teams
- Milwaukee Brewers (1992–1993); Wei Chuan Dragons (1995)

Williams Suero Urban (November 7, 1966 – November 30, 1995) was a Dominican backup infielder in Major League Baseball, playing mainly as a second baseman from 1992 through 1993 for the Milwaukee Brewers. Listed at 5' 9", 175 lb., Suero batted and threw right-handed. He was born in Santo Domingo, Dominican Republic.

In a two-season career, Suero was a .233 hitter (7-for-30) in 33 games, including four runs, a double, and one stolen base.

After the 1995 season, at the age of 29, Suero died in his native Santo Domingo when he lost control of his car and crashed into a utility pole.

== See also ==
- List of players from Dominican Republic in Major League Baseball
