= Denis Boucher =

Canadian baseball player (born 1968)

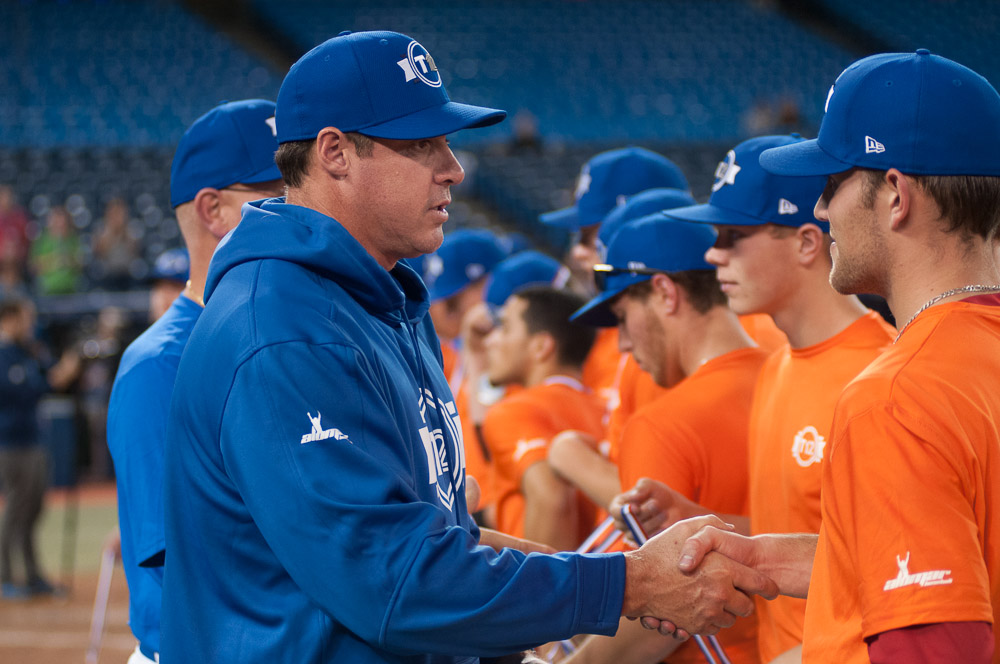
- Boucher (left) in 2014
- Pitcher
- Born: March 7, 1968 (age 58); Montreal, Quebec, Canada
- Batted: Right Threw: Left

MLB debut
- April 12, 1991, for the Toronto Blue Jays

Last MLB appearance
- May 21, 1994, for the Montreal Expos

MLB statistics
- Win–loss record: 6–11
- Earned run average: 5.42
- Strikeouts: 77
- Stats at Baseball Reference

Teams
- Toronto Blue Jays (1991); Cleveland Indians (1991–1992); Montreal Expos (1993–1994)

Member of the Canadian

Baseball Hall of Fame
- Induction: 2023

Denis Boucher (born March 7, 1968) is a Canadian former professional baseball starting pitcher. He played in Major League Baseball (MLB) for the Toronto Blue Jays, Cleveland Indians, and Montreal Expos. He represented Canada at the 1987 Pan American Games. After retirement he went to work for Air Canada in Montreal, before becoming a scout in 2019. He is currently a scout for the New York Yankees.

Boucher served as the pitching coach for the Canada national team at the 2006 World Baseball Classic. He was the pitching coach of the Canada national team for the Beijing 2008 Summer Olympics. Boucher is one of only four Canadians to have played for both the Toronto Blue Jays and Montreal Expos, the others being Matt Stairs, Rob Ducey and Shawn Hill.

He now lives in Montreal (Lachine), where he is developing youth baseball programs.

Boucher ran as a candidate for Ensemble Montréal for Lachine Borough Council in the 2021 Montreal municipal election.
