= Tom Candiotti =

American baseball player (born 1956)

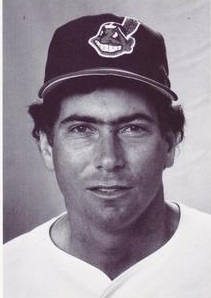
- Candiotti with the Cleveland Indians in 1987
- Pitcher
- Born: August 31, 1956 (age 69); Walnut Creek, California, U.S.
- Batted: Right Threw: Right

MLB debut
- August 8, 1983, for the Milwaukee Brewers

Last MLB appearance
- July 24, 1999, for the Cleveland Indians

MLB statistics
- Win–loss record: 151–164
- Earned run average: 3.73
- Strikeouts: 1,735
- Stats at Baseball Reference

Teams
- Milwaukee Brewers (1983–1984); Cleveland Indians (1986–1991); Toronto Blue Jays (1991); Los Angeles Dodgers (1992–1997); Oakland Athletics (1998–1999); Cleveland Indians (1999)

Thomas Caesar Candiotti (born August 31, 1956) is an American former knuckleball pitcher in Major League Baseball. He played for the Milwaukee Brewers, Cleveland Indians, Toronto Blue Jays, Oakland Athletics and Los Angeles Dodgers. Since the 2005 season, Candiotti is a television and radio analyst for the Arizona Diamondbacks.

== Early life ==
Candiotti is a graduate of Queen of All Saints Catholic School in Concord, California, Concord High School, and an alumnus of Saint Mary's College of California in Moraga, California. Candiotti pitched for the Saint Mary's baseball team for four years. He later said that he might not have been able to play college baseball at a larger school.

== Baseball career ==
Candiotti, nicknamed "The Candy Man" or simply "Candy", was not drafted by any major-league team. He got a shot when he traveled to Victoria, British Columbia, for a tryout with the independent Victoria Mussels of the Northwest League in 1979. Candiotti won five games that year for a Victoria team that lost out on the pennant by percentage points to the Walla Walla Padres. "I had no place to stay", Candiotti recalled years later. "For a week, I stayed in the locker room. After that, I stayed with a buddy. I slept on the floor at his place. I didn't have any money. I didn't have a car or anything. There were even a couple of times when I slept on the field in my sleeping bag. It was that bad."

Following his only season in Victoria, the Mussels sold Candiotti to the Kansas City Royals in 1980. However, he never pitched for the Royals, and was claimed in the Rule 5 draft by Milwaukee that year. Candiotti won his first four major-league starts with Milwaukee in 1983, including a complete-game shutout on August 25 against California. In each of his first three career starts, Candiotti pitched at least seven innings and gave up one earned run or none. After two seasons with the Brewers, Candiotti signed with Cleveland in 1985, where he enjoyed his most successful seasons.

With the Indians of the 1980s, Candiotti had a record of 72–65, finishing only one season with a losing record. His best year for Cleveland was 1988, when he went 14–8 with a 3.28 ERA and 137 strikeouts. Candiotti became known for his use of the knuckleball. According to former Texas Rangers pitching coach Tom House, Candiotti was only the 20th pitcher in major-league history to throw the knuckleball on a full-time basis.

In June 1991, Toronto acquired him from Cleveland in a trade to help their playoff run. Candiotti led the Blue Jays' pitching staff with three complete games and a 2.98 ERA in 19 starts for a ballclub that had lost ace right-hander Dave Stieb to a season-ending injury. He was positioned to win the ERA title, as he had a major league-best 2.23 ERA on September 23, but gave up seven earned runs that night in California. In his first 16 starts with Toronto, his ERA was 2.21, a remarkable feat given the fact he threw the knuckleball and was working with two catchers, (Pat Borders and Greg Myers), who had never caught that pitch before. "It was tough for Myers and Borders to adjust to me mid-season", Candiotti said. "Because I threw the knuckleball, I normally spent more time with my catchers than other pitchers. People don’t realize this—even the guys in the media—but not having spring training to work with them made a big difference."

He left the Blue Jays the following season to sign with Los Angeles where he pitched well for six years, hampered by poor run support. From 1992 to 1996, Candiotti's 3.57 ERA was fourth-best among National League pitchers with at least 900 innings pitched, behind only Greg Maddux (2.13), Tom Glavine (3.16), and John Smoltz (3.27), and 11th-best in the majors overall. He made his last major-league appearance with the Indians in 1999.

On January 24, 2000, Candiotti signed a minor league contract with the Anaheim Angels but was released at the conclusion of spring training.

At the time of his retirement, Candiotti ranked in the top 100 all-time in major-league history in starts and strikeouts. In 2001, he was named one of the Top 100 Greatest Indians in Cleveland history.

== Post-playing career ==
Candiotti held a front office position with the Indians in 2000 and 2001. He joined ESPN in 2001 as an MLB broadcaster and an analyst on Baseball Tonight. From 2002 to 2005, Candiotti continued on Baseball Tonight and served as a commentator for the Toronto Blue Jays. He has worked for several seasons as a radio analyst for the Arizona Diamondbacks.

Candiotti had a small part in Billy Crystal's 2001 movie "61*" as knuckleball pitcher Hoyt Wilhelm. He was inducted into the International Bowling Museum's Hall of Fame on June 27, 2007.

== Personal life ==
Candiotti's marriage to his first wife, Debra, ended in divorce in 1992 after 11 years; he married Donna Beck in 1993.

Candiotti had two children with his wife, Donna. His son, Clark, pitches for the Fort Wayne TinCaps. He was drafted by the San Diego Padres in the 2024 MLB draft with their compensation pick for losing Blake Snell. His other son, Casey, pitches for the Holy Names Hawks.

== See also ==
- List of knuckleball pitchers
- List of Major League Baseball career hit batsmen leaders
