= 1990 Baltimore Orioles season =

Major League Baseball season

1990 Baltimore Orioles
- League: American League
- Division: East
- Ballpark: Memorial Stadium
- City: Baltimore, Maryland
- Record: 76–85 (.472)
- Divisional place: 5th
- Owners: Eli Jacobs
- General managers: Roland Hemond
- Managers: Frank Robinson
- Television: WMAR-TV (Jim Palmer, Brooks Robinson); Home Team Sports (Rex Barney, Mel Proctor, John Lowenstein)
- Radio: WBAL (AM) (Jon Miller, Joe Angel, Charlie Slowes)

The 1990 Baltimore Orioles season was the 90th season in Baltimore Orioles franchise history, the 37th in Baltimore, and the 37th at Memorial Stadium. The Orioles finished fifth in the American League East with a record of 76 wins and 85 losses.

== Offseason ==
- October 3, 1989: Mark Huismann was released by the Orioles.
- November 2, 1989: Jamie Quirk was released by the Orioles.
- December 5, 1989: Keith Hughes and Cesar Mejia (minors) were traded by the Orioles to the New York Mets for John Mitchell and Joaquin Contreras (minors).
- February 20, 1990: Sam Horn was signed as a free agent by the Orioles.
- February 22, 1990: Danny Boone was signed as a free agent by the Orioles.

== Regular season ==
On May 25, 1990, the Orioles announced that the team would move their spring training home games from Miami Stadium where they had played since 1959 to Bradenton and Sarasota in 1991. When Cleveland announced that they would leave Hi Corbett Field for Florida, Tucson tried to attract the Orioles to move to Arizona.

Ben McDonald became the first Oriole to win his first six major league decisions.

=== Season standings ===
AL East
Team	W	L	Pct.	GB	Home	Road
Boston Red Sox	88	74	.543	—	51‍–‍30	37‍–‍44
Toronto Blue Jays	86	76	.531	2	44‍–‍37	42‍–‍39
Detroit Tigers	79	83	.488	9	39‍–‍42	40‍–‍41
Cleveland Indians	77	85	.475	11	41‍–‍40	36‍–‍45
Baltimore Orioles	76	85	.472	11½	40‍–‍40	36‍–‍45
Milwaukee Brewers	74	88	.457	14	39‍–‍42	35‍–‍46
New York Yankees	67	95	.414	21	37‍–‍44	30‍–‍51

=== Record vs. opponents ===
1990 American League record Sources:
Team	BAL	BOS	CAL	CWS	CLE	DET	KC	MIL	MIN	NYY	OAK	SEA	TEX	TOR
Baltimore	—	4–9	7–5	6–6	6–7	6–7	8–3	7–6	6–6	6–7	4–8	3–9	8–4	5–8
Boston	9–4	—	7–5	6–6	9–4	8–5	4–8	5–8	4–8	9–4	4–8	8–4	5–7	10–3
California	5–7	5–7	—	5–8	7–5	5–7	7–6	7–5	9–4	6–6	4–9	5–8	8–5	7–5
Chicago	6–6	6–6	8–5	—	5–7	5–7	9–4	10–2	7–6	10–2	8–5	8–5	7–6	5–7
Cleveland	7–6	4–9	5–7	7–5	—	5–8	6–6	9–4	7–5	5–8	4–8	7–5	7–5	4–9
Detroit	7–6	5–8	7–5	7–5	8–5	—	5–7	3–10	6–6	7–6	6–6	7–5	6–6	5–8
Kansas City	3–8	8–4	6–7	4–9	6–6	7–5	—	4–8	8–5	8–4	4–9	7–6	5–8	5–7
Milwaukee	6–7	8–5	5–7	2–10	4–9	10–3	8–4	—	4–8	6–7	5–7	4–8	5–7	7–6
Minnesota	6–6	8–4	4–9	6–7	5–7	6–6	5–8	8–4	—	6–6	6–7	6–7	5–8	3–9
New York	7–6	4–9	6–6	2–10	8–5	6–7	4–8	7–6	6–6	—	0–12	9–3	3–9	5–8
Oakland	8–4	8–4	9–4	5–8	8–4	6–6	9–4	7–5	7–6	12–0	—	9–4	8–5	7–5
Seattle	9–3	4–8	8–5	5–8	5–7	5–7	6–7	8–4	7–6	3–9	4–9	—	7–6	6–6
Texas	4–8	7–5	5–8	6–7	5–7	6–6	8–5	7–5	8–5	9–3	5–8	6–7	—	7–5
Toronto	8–5	3–10	5–7	7–5	9–4	8–5	7–5	6–7	9–3	8–5	5–7	6–6	5–7	—

=== Opening Day starters ===
- Phil Bradley
- Steve Finley
- Sam Horn
- Dave Johnson
- Randy Milligan
- Joe Orsulak
- Billy Ripken
- Cal Ripken Jr.
- Mickey Tettleton
- Craig Worthington

=== Notable transactions ===
- June 4, 1990: 1990 Major League Baseball draft
  - Mike Mussina was drafted by the Orioles in the first round.
  - Scott McClain was drafted by the Orioles in the 22nd round. Player signed June 7, 1990.
- June 5, 1990: Jay Tibbs was traded by the Orioles to the Pittsburgh Pirates for a player to be named later. The Pirates completed the deal by sending Dorn Taylor to the Orioles on September 5.
- July 30, 1990: Phil Bradley was traded by the Orioles to the Chicago White Sox for Ron Kittle.

=== Roster ===
1990 Baltimore Orioles
Roster
Pitchers: 46 Jay Aldrich; 29 Jeff Ballard; 48 José Bautista; 37 Danny Boone; 17 Pete Harnisch; 45 Kevin Hickey; 51 Brian Holton; 27 Dave Johnson; 19 Ben McDonald; 52 José Mesa; 18 Bob Milacki; 24 John Mitchell; 30 Gregg Olson; 23 Joe Price; 43 Curt Schilling; 41 Mike Smith; 46 Dorn Taylor; 50 Anthony Telford; 50 Jay Tibbs; 34 Mickey Weston; 32 Mark Williamson	Catchers: 28 Chris Hoiles; 2 Bob Melvin; 14 Mickey Tettleton; Infielders: 1 Juan Bell; 28 Marty Brown; 11 Leo Gómez; 88 Rene Gonzales; 15 Sam Horn; 36 Tim Hulett; 42 Ron Kittle; 38 Jeff McKnight; 39 Randy Milligan; 3 Billy Ripken; 8 Cal Ripken Jr.; 21 David Segui; 25 Craig Worthington	Outfielders: 9 Brady Anderson; 1 Phil Bradley; 12 Mike Devereaux; 10 Steve Finley; 35 Dave Gallagher; 49 Stan Jefferson; 49 Brad Komminsk; 21 Donell Nixon; 6 Joe Orsulak; Other batters: 35 Greg Walker	Manager: 20 Frank Robinson; Coaches: 44 Elrod Hendricks (Bullpen); 31 Al Jackson (Pitching); 40 Tom McCraw (Hitting); 47 Curt Motton (First base); 26 Johnny Oates (Bench); 7 Cal Ripken, Sr. (Third base)

== Player stats ==
=== Batting ===
==== Starters by position ====
Note: Pos = Position; G = Games played; AB = At bats; H = Hits; Avg. = Batting average; HR = Home runs; RBI = Runs Batted In

Pos	Player	G	AB	H	Avg.	HR	RBI
C	Mickey Tettleton	135	444	99	.223	15	51
1B	Randy Milligan	109	362	96	.265	20	60
2B	Billy Ripken	129	406	118	.291	3	38
3B	Craig Worthington	133	425	96	.226	8	44
SS	Cal Ripken Jr.	161	600	150	.250	21	84
LF	Phil Bradley	72	289	78	.270	4	26
CF	Mike Devereaux	108	367	88	.240	12	49
RF	Joe Orsulak	124	413	111	.269	11	57
DH	Sam Horn	79	246	61	.248	14	45

==== Other batters ====
Note: G = Games played; AB = At bats; H = Hits; Avg. = Batting average; HR = Home runs; RBI = Runs batted in

Player	G	AB	H	Avg.	HR	RBI
Steve Finley	142	464	119	.256	3	37
Bob Melvin	93	301	73	.231	5	37
Brady Anderson	89	234	54	.231	3	24
Tim Hulett	53	153	39	.255	3	16
David Segui	40	123	30	.244	2	15
Rene Gonzales	67	103	22	.214	1	12
Brad Komminsk	46	101	24	.238	3	8
Jeff McKnight	29	75	15	.200	1	4
Chris Hoiles	23	63	12	.190	1	6
Ron Kittle	22	61	10	.164	2	3
Dave Gallagher	23	51	11	.216	0	2
Leo Gómez	12	39	9	.231	0	1
Greg Walker	14	34	5	.147	0	2
Donell Nixon	8	20	5	.250	0	2
Stan Jefferson	10	19	0	.000	0	0
Marty Brown	9	15	3	.200	0	0
Juan Bell	5	2	0	.000	0	0

=== Pitching ===
==== Starting pitchers ====
Note: G = Games pitched; IP = Innings pitched; W = Wins; L = Losses; ERA = Earned run average; SO = Strikeouts

Player	G	IP	W	L	ERA	SO
Pete Harnisch	31	188.2	11	11	4.34	122
Dave Johnson	30	180.0	13	9	4.10	68
Bob Milacki	27	135.1	5	8	4.46	60
Ben McDonald	21	118.2	8	5	2.43	65
Jay Tibbs	10	50.2	2	7	5.68	23
José Mesa	7	46.2	3	2	3.86	24

==== Other pitchers ====
Note: G = Games pitched; IP = Innings pitched; W = Wins; L = Losses; ERA = Earned run average; SO = Strikeouts

Player	G	IP	W	L	ERA	SO
Jeff Ballard	44	133.1	2	11	4.93	50
John Mitchell	24	114.1	6	6	4.64	43
Anthony Telford	8	36.1	3	3	4.95	20
Mickey Weston	9	21.0	0	1	7.71	9
Danny Boone	4	9.2	0	0	2.79	2

==== Relief pitchers ====
Note: G = Games pitched; W = Wins; L = Losses; SV = Saves; ERA = Earned run average; SO = Strikeouts

Player	G	W	L	SV	ERA	SO
Gregg Olson	64	6	5	37	2.42	74
Joe Price	50	3	4	0	3.58	54
Mark Williamson	49	8	2	1	2.21	60
Kevin Hickey	37	1	3	1	5.13	17
Curt Schilling	35	1	2	3	2.54	32
Brian Holton	33	2	3	0	4.50	27
José Bautista	22	1	0	0	4.05	15
Jay Aldrich	7	1	2	1	8.25	5
Dorn Taylor	4	0	1	0	2.45	4
Mike Smith	2	0	0	0	12.00	2

== Farm system ==
Level	Team	League	Manager
AAA	Rochester Red Wings	International League	Greg Biagini
AA	Hagerstown Suns	Eastern League	Jerry Narron
A	Frederick Keys	Carolina League	Wally Moon
A	Wausau Timbers	Midwest League	Mike Young
Rookie	Bluefield Orioles	Appalachian League	Gus Gil

LEAGUE CHAMPIONS: Rochester, Frederick
