= 1989 Baltimore Orioles season =

Major League Baseball season

1989 Baltimore Orioles
- League: American League
- Division: East
- Ballpark: Memorial Stadium
- City: Baltimore, Maryland
- Record: 87–75 (.537)
- Divisional place: 2nd
- Owners: Eli Jacobs
- General managers: Roland Hemond
- Managers: Frank Robinson
- Television: WMAR-TV (Jim Palmer, Brooks Robinson); Home Team Sports (Rex Barney, Mel Proctor, John Lowenstein)
- Radio: WBAL (AM) (Jon Miller, Joe Angel, Charlie Slowes)

The 1989 Baltimore Orioles season was the 89th season in Baltimore Orioles franchise history, the 36th in Baltimore, and the 36th at Memorial Stadium. The Orioles finished second in the American League East with a record of 87 wins and 75 losses. The team was known as the Comeback Kids as they rebounded from the 54 wins and 107 losses of the 1988 season. The season also took on the "Why Not?!" promotional slogan as the team's pursuit of the pennant went down to the final series of the regular season. The Orioles went into the three-game season finale against the first place Toronto Blue Jays down by one game in the AL East standings and needing either a sweep to win the AL East championship, or two wins to force a one-game playoff. The Blue Jays won the first two games of the series, clinching first place on the penultimate game of the season.

The Orioles wore new uniforms which were unveiled on December 14, 1988. More conservative in appearance, the ensemble featured black belts replacing elastic waist bands on the pants and black numbers and letters with orange outline on the away version. The most noticeable change was the caps and helmets which went from being tricolored with a smiling cartoon bird head to monochromatic black with an ornithologically correct oriole. The smiling cartoon bird head returned to the ballclub's caps and helmets 23 years later in 2012.

== Offseason ==
- October 3, 1988: Don Aase was released by the Orioles.
- November 9, 1988: Pete Blohm (minors) was traded by the Orioles to the Pittsburgh Pirates for Randy Milligan.
- November 17, 1988: Dickie Noles was released by the Orioles.
- December 4, 1988: Eddie Murray was traded by the Orioles to the Los Angeles Dodgers for Ken Howell, Brian Holton, and Juan Bell.
- December 8, 1988: Ken Howell and Gordon Dillard were traded by the Orioles to the Philadelphia Phillies for Phil Bradley.
- March 1, 1989: Mark Huismann was signed as a free agent by the Orioles.
- March 31, 1989: Carl Nichols was traded by the Orioles to the Houston Astros for Dave Johnson and Victor Hithe (minors).

== Regular season ==
- Bill Ripken's 1989 Fleer Baseball Card (#616) made national news when it included a hidden obscenity (the words "fuck face"). The obscenity was printed in black marker on the knob of his bat. Once the discovery was made public, subsequent printings of the card were issued with the words obscured. The first obscuring involved a blob of white out, another was scribbled with a black pen while the last was covered with a black square.
- In the finale of the 1989 season, Ben McDonald tossed one scoreless inning of relief, logging his first career win. Of note, he would become the sixth player to make the majors in the same season that he was selected as the number one overall pick in the Major League Baseball Amateur Draft.

=== Opening Day starters ===
- Brady Anderson
- Phil Bradley
- Steve Finley
- Rene Gonzales
- Cal Ripken Jr.
- Dave Schmidt
- Larry Sheets
- Mickey Tettleton
- Jim Traber
- Craig Worthington

=== Season standings ===
AL East
Team	W	L	Pct.	GB	Home	Road
Toronto Blue Jays	89	73	.549	—	46‍–‍35	43‍–‍38
Baltimore Orioles	87	75	.537	2	47‍–‍34	40‍–‍41
Boston Red Sox	83	79	.512	6	46‍–‍35	37‍–‍44
Milwaukee Brewers	81	81	.500	8	45‍–‍36	36‍–‍45
New York Yankees	74	87	.460	14½	41‍–‍40	33‍–‍47
Cleveland Indians	73	89	.451	16	41‍–‍40	32‍–‍49
Detroit Tigers	59	103	.364	30	38‍–‍43	21‍–‍60

=== Record vs. opponents ===
1989 American League record Sources:
Team	BAL	BOS	CAL	CWS	CLE	DET	KC	MIL	MIN	NYY	OAK	SEA	TEX	TOR
Baltimore	—	6–7	6–6	6–6	7–6	10–3	6–6	7–6	4–8	8–5	5–7	6–6	9–3	7–6
Boston	7–6	—	4–8	7–5	8–5	11–2	4–8	6–7	6–6	7–6	7–5	5–7	6–6	5–8
California	6–6	8–4	—	8–5	5–7	11–1	4–9	7–5	11–2	6–6	5–8	7–6	6–7	7–5
Chicago	6–6	5–7	5–8	—	7–5	4–8	6–7	10–2	5–8	5–6	5–8	7–6	3–10	1–11
Cleveland	6–7	5–8	7–5	5–7	—	5–8	8–4	3–10	5–7	9–4	2–10	6–6	7–5	5–8
Detroit	3–10	2–11	1–11	8–4	8–5	—	6–6	6–7	5–7	6–7	4–8	4–8	4–8	2–11
Kansas City	6–6	8–4	9–4	7–6	4–8	6–6	—	8–4	7–6	6–6	7–6	9–4	8–5	7–5
Milwaukee	6–7	7–6	5–7	2–10	10–3	7–6	4–8	—	9–3	8–5	5–7	7–5	5–7	6–7
Minnesota	8–4	6–6	2–11	8–5	7–5	7–5	6–7	3–9	—	6–6	6–7	7–6	5–8	9–3
New York	5–8	6–7	6–6	6–5	4–9	7–6	6–6	5–8	6–6	—	3–9	8–4	5–7	7–6
Oakland	7–5	5–7	8–5	8–5	10–2	8–4	6–7	7–5	7–6	9–3	—	9–4	8–5	7–5
Seattle	6–6	7–5	6–7	6–7	6–6	8–4	4–9	5–7	6–7	4–8	4–9	—	6–7	5–7
Texas	3–9	6–6	7–6	10–3	5–7	8–4	5–8	7–5	8–5	7–5	5–8	7–6	—	5–7
Toronto	6–7	8–5	5–7	11–1	8–5	11–2	5–7	7–6	3–9	6–7	5–7	7–5	7–5	—

=== Notable transactions ===
- May 19, 1989: Rick Schu was purchased from the Orioles by the Detroit Tigers.
- June 1, 1989: John Posey (minors) was traded by the Orioles to the Philadelphia Phillies for Shane Turner.
- June 5, 1989: 1989 Major League Baseball draft
  - Ben McDonald was drafted by the Orioles in the 1st round (1st pick). Player signed August 19, 1989.
  - Mike Oquist was drafted by the Orioles in the 13th round. Player signed June 14, 1989.
  - Gregg Zaun was drafted by the Orioles in the 17th round. Player signed August 25, 1989.
- July 20, 1989: John Habyan was traded by the Orioles to the New York Yankees for Stan Jefferson.
- July 28, 1989: Brian Dubois was traded by the Orioles to the Detroit Tigers for Keith Moreland.
- August 5, 1989: Jamie Quirk was signed as a free agent by the Orioles.

=== Roster ===
1989 Baltimore Orioles
Roster
Pitchers: 29 Jeff Ballard; 48 José Bautista; 42 Pete Harnisch; 23,45 Kevin Hickey; 37,51 Brian Holton; 52 Mark Huismann; 27,35 Dave Johnson; 23 Ben McDonald; 18 Bob Milacki; 30 Gregg Olson; 43 Curt Schilling; 24 Dave Schmidt; 41 Mike Smith; 21 Mark Thurmond; 50 Jay Tibbs; 34 Mickey Weston; 32 Mark Williamson	Catchers: 11,17 Chris Hoiles; 2,36 Bob Melvin; 15 Jamie Quirk; 14 Mickey Tettleton; Infielders: 11 Juan Bell; 88 Rene Gonzales; 36 Tim Hulett; 35,43 Francisco Meléndez; 15,39 Randy Milligan; 3 Billy Ripken; 8 Cal Ripken Jr.; 13 Rick Schu; 28 Jim Traber; 11,25 Craig Worthington	Outfielders: 9 Brady Anderson; 16 Phil Bradley; 46 Butch Davis; 12 Mike Devereaux; 10 Steve Finley; 49 Stan Jefferson; 1,6 Joe Orsulak; Other batters: 6 Keith Moreland; 19 Larry Sheets	Manager: 20 Frank Robinson; Coaches: 44 Elrod Hendricks (Bullpen); 31 Al Jackson (Pitching); 40 Tommy McCraw (Hitting); 47 Curt Motton (First Base); 26 Johnny Oates (Bench); 7 Cal Ripken, Sr. (Third Base)

== Player stats ==
= Indicates team leader

=== Batting ===
==== Starters by position ====
Note: Pos = Position; G = Games played; AB = At bats; H = Hits; Avg. = Batting average; HR = Home runs; RBI = Runs batted in

Pos	Player	G	AB	H	Avg.	HR	RBI
C	Mickey Tettleton	117	411	106	.258	26	65
1B	Randy Milligan	124	365	98	.268	12	45
2B	Billy Ripken	115	318	76	.239	2	26
3B	Craig Worthington	145	497	123	.247	15	70
SS	Cal Ripken Jr.	162	646	166	.257	21	93
LF	Phil Bradley	144	545	151	.277	11	55
CF	Mike Devereaux	122	391	104	.266	8	46
RF	Joe Orsulak	123	390	111	.285	7	55
DH	Larry Sheets	102	304	74	.243	7	33

==== Other batters ====
Note: G = Games played; AB = At bats; H = Hits; Avg. = Batting average; HR = Home runs; RBI = Runs batted in

Player	G	AB	H	Avg.	HR	RBI
Bob Melvin	85	278	67	.241	1	32
Brady Anderson	94	266	55	.207	4	16
Jim Traber	86	234	49	.209	4	26
Steve Finley	82	217	54	.249	2	25
Rene Gonzales	71	166	36	.217	1	11
Stan Jefferson	35	127	33	.260	4	20
Keith Moreland	33	107	23	.215	1	10
Tim Hulett	33	97	27	.278	3	18
Jamie Quirk	25	51	11	.216	0	9
Francisco Meléndez	9	11	3	.273	0	3
Chris Hoiles	6	9	1	.111	0	1
Butch Davis	5	6	1	.167	0	0
Juan Bell	8	4	0	.000	0	0
Rick Schu	1	0	0	----	0	0

=== Pitching ===
==== Starting pitchers ====
Note: G = Games pitched; IP = Innings pitched; W = Wins; L = Losses; ERA = Earned run average; SO = Strikeouts

Player	G	IP	W	L	ERA	SO
Bob Milacki	37	243.0	14	12	3.74	113
Jeff Ballard	35	215.1	18	8	3.43	62
Pete Harnisch	18	103.1	5	9	4.62	70
José Bautista	15	78.0	3	4	5.31	30
Dave Johnson	14	89.1	4	7	4.23	26
Jay Tibbs	10	54.1	5	0	2.82	30

==== Other pitchers ====
Note: G = Games pitched; IP = Innings pitched; W = Wins; L = Losses; ERA = Earned run average; SO = Strikeouts

Player	G	IP	W	L	ERA	SO
Dave Schmidt	38	156.2	10	13	5.69	46
Brian Holton	39	116.1	5	7	4.02	51
Curt Schilling	5	8.2	0	1	6.23	6

==== Relief pitchers ====
Note: G = Games pitched; IP = Innings pitched; W = Wins; L = Losses; SV = Saves; ERA = Earned run average; SO = Strikeouts

Player	G	IP	W	L	SV	ERA	SO
Gregg Olson	64	85.0	5	2	27	1.69	90
Mark Williamson	65	107.1	10	5	9	2.93	55
Kevin Hickey	51	49.1	2	3	2	2.92	28
Mark Thurmond	49	90.0	2	4	4	3.90	34
Mike Smith	13	20.0	2	0	0	7.65	12
Mark Huismann	8	11.1	0	0	1	6.35	13
Mickey Weston	7	13.0	1	0	1	5.54	7
Ben McDonald	6	7.0	1	0	0	8.59	3

== Awards and honors ==
- Frank Robinson, Associated Press Manager of the Year
- Frank Robinson, American League Manager of the Year
- Gregg Olson, American League Rookie of the Year

MLB All-Star Game

- Cal Ripken Jr.

== Farm system ==
Level	Team	League	Manager
AAA	Rochester Red Wings	International League	Greg Biagini
AA	Hagerstown Suns	Eastern League	Jimmie Schaffer
A	Frederick Keys	Carolina League	Jerry Narron
A-Short Season	Erie Orioles	New York–Penn League	Bobby Tolan
Rookie	Bluefield Orioles	Appalachian League	Mike Young
