= John Coppolella =

American baseball executive (born 1978)

- Born: July 28, 1978 (age 48); Garden Grove, California, U.S.
- Education: University of Notre Dame
- Occupation: Former baseball executive
- Years active: 2000–2017

John Coppolella (born July 28, 1978) is an American former baseball front office executive who served as the general manager of the Atlanta Braves of Major League Baseball (MLB) from 2015 through 2017. Coppolella resigned as general manager of the Braves after he committed amateur signing infractions. MLB banned him for life as a result of those violations, though he was later reinstated.

== Early life and career ==
Coppolella was born on July 28, 1978. He graduated magna cum laude with a business management degree from the University of Notre Dame.

Prior to graduating, Coppolella was offered and initially accepted a job at Intel. He chose to continue exploring opportunities in baseball, and ultimately turned Intel down for a minimum wage internship with the New York Yankees, and eventually was hired into a salaried position working for the MLB team from 2000 through 2006.

== Atlanta Braves ==
In 2006, Coppolella joined the Braves as their director of baseball operations. He held that position until 2011, when he served as director of professional scouting. In 2012, Coppolella was promoted to assistant general manager. After Frank Wren was fired as the Braves' general manager after the 2014 season, John Hart took over as the president of baseball operations of the Braves, with Coppolella heavily involved in the team's transactions, including the trades of Craig Kimbrel and Jason Heyward. The Braves announced on October 1, 2015, that Coppolella was promoted to general manager, and signed to a four-year contract. On October 2, 2017, Coppolella resigned his position as general manager, after Major League Baseball disclosed several infractions regarding the Braves' signings of international players. Even before then, Coppolella had been under fire for disregarding MLB rules against tampering with players on other teams. He also had a reputation for cutting illicit pre-draft deals with amateur players or visiting them early, such as with prospect Robert Puason (which featured two Braves executives in Terry McGuirk and John Hart present, a violation of the rules).

On November 21, 2017, Coppolella was banned for life from baseball by MLB as a result of their investigation into the matter. According to The Athletic, Commissioner Rob Manfred was angered when Coppolella tried to "deny the truth and evade blame" for his role in the scandal, a major factor in the decision to permanently ban Coppolella. Coppolella's behavior was still fresh on Manfred's mind when the commissioner attended the 2017 general managers' meetings in November, at which Manfred put the general managers on notice that he would not tolerate violations of MLB signing rules.

Coppolella was reinstated on January 9, 2023. He'd given a number of lectures at his alma mater about the lessons he'd learned, and apologized to several people associated with the Braves for his actions. According to sources close to the commissioner's office, this and other steps convinced Manfred that Coppolella was remorseful about his conduct.

== Personal life ==
Coppolella is married and has three children.

Sporting positions
Preceded by John Hart	Atlanta Braves General Manager; 2015–2017	Succeeded by John Hart
