= Mickey Weston =

American baseball player (born 1961)

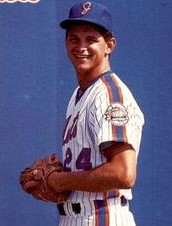
- Pitcher
- Born: March 26, 1961 (age 64); Flint, Michigan, U.S.
- Batted: Right Threw: Right

MLB debut
- June 18, 1989, for the Baltimore Orioles

Last MLB appearance
- May 9, 1993, for the New York Mets

MLB statistics
- Win–loss record: 1–2
- Earned run average: 7.15
- Strikeouts: 19
- Stats at Baseball Reference

Teams
- Baltimore Orioles (1989–1990); Toronto Blue Jays (1991); Philadelphia Phillies (1992); New York Mets (1993)

Michael Lee "Mickey" Weston (born March 26, 1961) is an American former Major League Baseball pitcher for the Baltimore Orioles, New York Mets, Philadelphia Phillies, and Toronto Blue Jays. He pitched for five years in the major leagues and currently ministers to youth through baseball at UPI. Weston serves as team chaplain for the Chicago White Sox through Baseball Chapel.

On June 18, 1989, Weston picked up his only career major league save. It came against the Oakland Athletics. Weston pitched three shutout innings to close out a 4-2 Orioles victory, saving the game for starter Dave Schmidt. He spent most of the 1990 season with the Rochester Red Wings where he had an 11–1 record with a 1.98 ERA but was 7 2/3 innings short of qualifying for the ERA title. He was traded from the Orioles to the Blue Jays for Paul Kilgus on December 14, 1990.

A native of Flint, Michigan, Weston attended Eastern Michigan University. In 1981, he played collegiate summer baseball with the Chatham A's of the Cape Cod Baseball League. He was selected by the Mets in the 12th round of the 1982 MLB draft.
