= Ben McDonald =

American baseball player (born 1967)

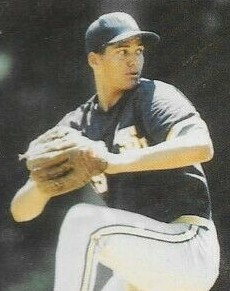
- Pitcher
- Born: November 24, 1967 (age 58); Baton Rouge, Louisiana, U.S.
- Batted: Right Threw: Right

MLB debut
- September 6, 1989, for the Baltimore Orioles

Last MLB appearance
- July 16, 1997, for the Milwaukee Brewers

MLB statistics
- Win–loss record: 78–70
- Earned run average: 3.91
- Strikeouts: 894
- Stats at Baseball Reference

Teams
- Baltimore Orioles (1989–1995); Milwaukee Brewers (1996–1997)

Career highlights and awards
- Golden Spikes Award (1989); Baseball America College Player of the Year Award (1989)

Member of the College

Baseball Hall of Fame
- Induction: 2008
Medals
Men's baseball
Representing United States
Olympic Games
Gold medal – first place	1988 Seoul	Team
Baseball World Cup
Silver medal – second place	1988 Rome	Team

Larry Benard McDonald (born November 24, 1967) is an American former Major League Baseball (MLB) pitcher. The first overall pick in the 1989 MLB draft, he played for the Baltimore Orioles and Milwaukee Brewers from 1989 through 1997. He also won an Olympic gold medal in 1988 as part of the US Olympic baseball team in Seoul, South Korea.

== Early life ==
McDonald grew up in Denham Springs, Louisiana, about 15 miles east of Baton Rouge. An all-round athlete at Denham Springs High School, he primarily played baseball and basketball, but also played football, earning All-State Honorable Mention as a punter/kicker. As a pitcher in his senior year, he led the baseball team to their first 4A championship, compiling a 12-1 record with a 0.73 ERA, including five shutouts, two no-hitters, and striking out 103 batters while only allowing 22 hits. He later said however, that his first love was basketball, and at 6 ft 7 in (2.01 m) he excelled in that as well, as a junior averaging 20.2 points and 10.2 rebounds per game, making the All-State Second Team and winning District MVP.

== Baseball career ==
=== Amateur ===
After graduating from high school, McDonald was the 670th selection in the 27th round by the Atlanta Braves in the 1986 MLB draft. He elected not to sign despite the Braves' $75,000 offer ($218,350 in 2025) which at the time was given to second-round draftees. He felt he was not ready for professional baseball, and preferred attending Louisiana State University (LSU) first, where he had been offered a basketball scholarship.

McDonald played two sports at LSU. He was a reserve forward with the Tigers basketball team, appearing in 32 games with five starts as a freshman before his playing time diminished to six games exclusively off the bench during his sophomore year.

McDonald led the 1988 US Olympic Team to a gold medal for baseball, winning complete games against host South Korea and Puerto Rico. During his three-year college career at LSU, McDonald twice helped his team reach the College World Series. He gave up a walk-off grand slam to Stanford's Paul Carey in the 1987 series. His best collegiate season came in 1989, which he finished with a 14–4 record, a 3.49 ERA, and a then-Southeastern Conference record 202 strikeouts. That year, he was selected as a member of the All-America team, and won the Golden Spikes Award. In 1989, he played collegiate summer baseball with the Orleans Cardinals of the Cape Cod Baseball League, recording one start.

=== Prospect ===
McDonald was one of the biggest prospects in baseball history, and was widely being compared to the best pitchers in all of Major League Baseball while he was still an amateur.

Before he was drafted, McDonald was approached by a representative of a proposed baseball league which was looking to set up competition to Major League Baseball. One of those involved in trying to establish the new league was prominent real estate magnate and future US President Donald Trump. McDonald was offered $2 million as a signing bonus by Trump's representatives, a number which was double what he was expected to be offered by the Major League team which drafted him, to forego MLB and instead sign with the alternative league. Orioles' star shortstop Cal Ripken Jr. wrote McDonald a letter imploring him to reject the proposed alternative league and instead join the Orioles, the team which held the first draft pick and had the ability to draft him, as they ultimately did.

=== Minor leagues ===
The Baltimore Orioles made McDonald the first overall selection in the 1989 June draft. He was the first of two LSU Tigers to have been drafted number one, joined by Paul Skenes in 2023.

McDonald signed with the Orioles on August 19; less than three weeks later, on September 6, he made his major league debut. McDonald was the second member of his draft class to reach the majors, coming up three days after his Olympic teammate John Olerud was promoted by the Toronto Blue Jays.

=== Baltimore Orioles ===
In the finale of the 1989 season, McDonald tossed one scoreless inning of relief versus the American League East champion Toronto Blue Jays, logging his first career win. He became the sixth player to make the majors in the same season that he was selected as the number one overall pick in the Major League Baseball Amateur Draft.

Midway through the 1990 season, McDonald was called up to the majors, joining the Orioles' starting rotation in 1990. In his first major league start on July 21, he threw a complete-game shutout against the Chicago White Sox. At the end of the season, he finished eighth in Rookie of the Year voting, with the award going to catcher Sandy Alomar Jr. McDonald would go on to spend seven seasons with the Orioles, before leaving as a free agent in 1996 to join the Milwaukee Brewers. He never led his league in a major category, but ranked among the top 10 at various times in categories such as complete games, wins, ERA, WHIP, and strikeouts. McDonald was the first #1 draft pick in history to win his first three Major League starts, a feat later matched by Gerrit Cole.

=== Milwaukee Brewers ===
While with the Brewers, McDonald began to encounter shoulder problems, missing part of the 1997 season. He was traded to the Cleveland Indians that offseason, in a deal that brought Marquis Grissom and Jeff Juden to Milwaukee in exchange for him, Mike Fetters, and Ron Villone. McDonald would never pitch for the Indians, though, as an operation to repair his rotator cuff on February 26, 1998 proved unsuccessful. He was ultimately forced to retire, and the Brewers sent Mark Watson to Cleveland to resolve their obligation in the matter.

McDonald ended his career with a 78–70 record, 894 strikeouts, and a 3.91 ERA in 1,291 1/3 innings pitched. He never pitched in the postseason.

In 2008, McDonald was elected to the College Baseball Hall of Fame.

== Post-baseball career ==
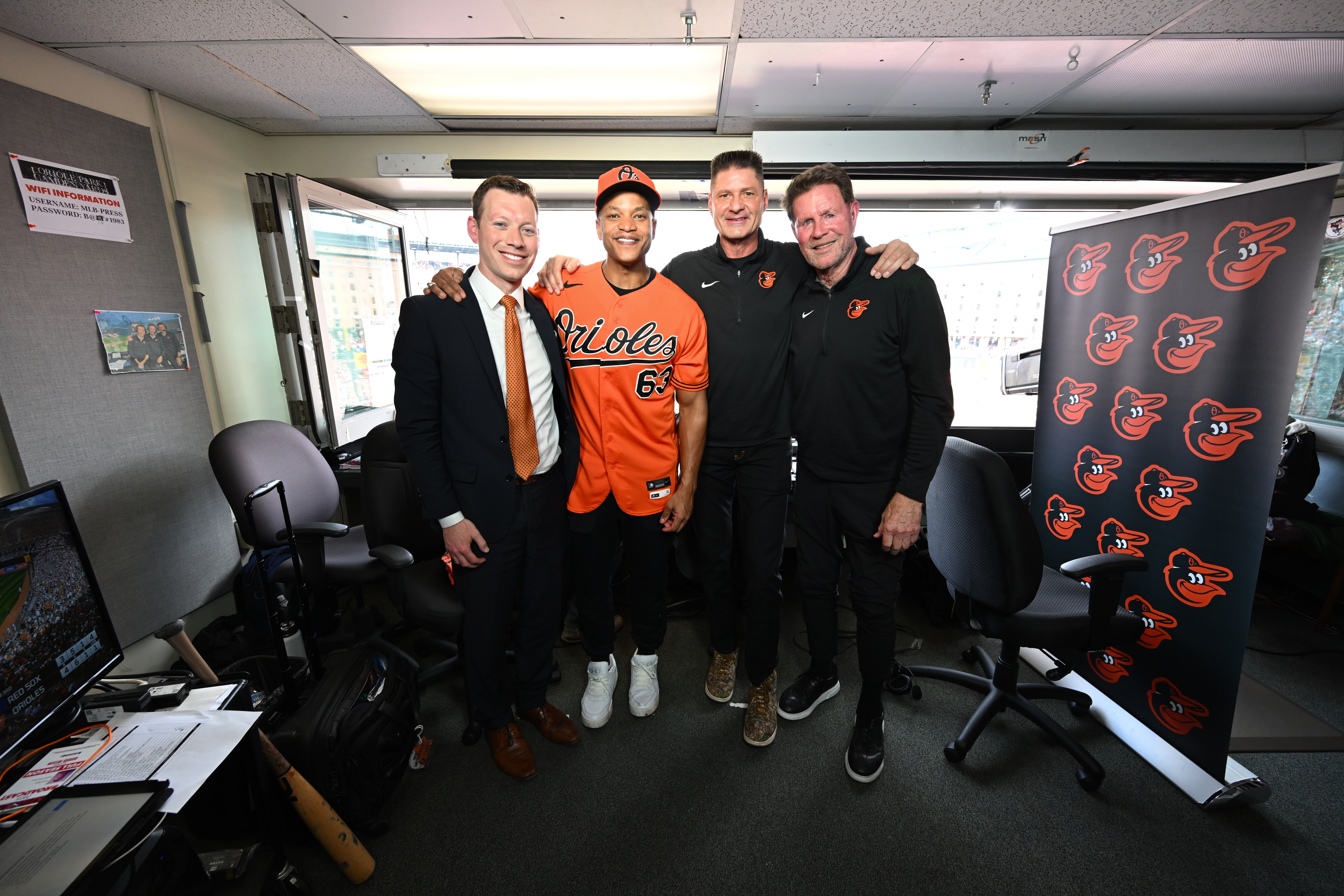
(From l. to r.) Sportscaster Kevin Brown, Maryland Governor Wes Moore, McDonald, and sportscaster Jim Palmer on March 31, 2025, day of the Orioles' 2025 home opener

McDonald is a color commentator for Orioles telecasts on MASN and on the radio for the Orioles Radio Network. He served as an assistant coach for the Denham Springs High School softball team in Denham Springs, Louisiana. He also is a color analyst for the NCAA Baseball Tournament on ESPN.

== Personal life ==
McDonald began dating Nicole Smith, a local girl and his college sweetheart, in 1989. Given an extended 1994-1995 baseball offseason due to the players' strike, the couple married on November 19, 1994. They share two children: daughter Jorie and son Jase.

Daughter Jorie was coached in softball by her father while she was growing up. She got married in 2025.

Jase McDonald was coached in baseball by his father. Like his father, Jase was a college pitcher. Jase pitched for LSU-Eunice.
