= John Hart (baseball) =

American baseball executive and manager

- Born: July 21, 1948 (age 78); Tampa, Florida, U.S.
- Occupation: Baseball executive

John Henry Hart Jr (born July 21, 1948) is an American former professional baseball executive who served as the general manager in Major League Baseball for the Cleveland Indians and Texas Rangers and president of baseball operations for the Atlanta Braves. He also was the interim field manager of the Indians in 1989, third-base coach of the Baltimore Orioles in 1988, and a studio analyst for the MLB Network.

== Early life ==
Hart was born in Tampa, Florida, and graduated from Winter Park High School. He attended Seminole Junior College where he was catcher on the baseball team. In 1969 he won All-American honors and began his professional career as a catcher in the Montreal Expos organization where he played under the name John Reen. He caught with them for three seasons before leaving the organization and returning to Florida. He graduated in 1973 from the University of Central Florida with majors in history and physical education.

== Baseball career ==
=== Baltimore Orioles ===
Hart then coached baseball at William R. Boone High School in Orlando, Florida before joining the Orioles organization in 1982 as a minor league manager. He managed in their minor league organization for six seasons before joining the major league team as third base coach in 1988.

=== Cleveland Indians ===
In 1989, John Hart joined the Cleveland Indians as a special assignment scout, then later replaced Doc Edwards as manager for the final 19 games of the regular season (the team put up an 8–11 record during those games). For the next two seasons, Hart served as director of baseball operations for the club.

In September 1991, John Hart replaced Hank Peters as general manager and executive vice president of the Indians. During the next ten years, the Indians were 870–681 under Hart. They won six of the seven possible American League Central division titles, which was introduced for the 1994 strike shortened season (1995–99 and 2001) with appearances in the World Series in 1995 and 1997. Hart built the team's core through the draft, successful scouting and trades. He signed young players before the arbitration process got underway and thus enticed veteran players to stay with the team.

=== Texas Rangers ===
At the beginning of the 2001 season, Hart announced it would be his last season as general manager of the Indians. After the season, Hart stayed true to his word and assistant GM Mark Shapiro took over as general manager on November 1. But, rather than take another position with the club or retire, Hart instead took the general manager position which had opened up with the Texas Rangers after the departure of Doug Melvin.

On February 15, 2004, the Rangers traded Alex Rodriguez (the AL Most Valuable Player of the 2003 season and only the second MVP on a last place team) to the New York Yankees for Alfonso Soriano and Joaquín Árias. They also had to pay over a third of the $179 million remaining on his contract (signed in 2000).

On July 21, 2004 the Rangers announced a contract extension for Hart for a guaranteed two more years and an annual mutual option to extend the contract each year thereafter. In addition, the contract stipulated that once it was terminated by either side, it automatically converted to a five-year agreement for Hart to serve as senior advisor to the owner.

Just over a year after agreeing to the extension, on October 4, 2005, Hart stepped down as general manager and was replaced by Jon Daniels. Hart then became a senior advisor to Daniels. During his four years as general manager, the Rangers compiled a record of 311–337, never advancing to the playoffs. After other teams showed interest in hiring Hart as their general manager during the 2005 off-season, the Rangers extended his senior advisor contract for three more years. He would serve in that post through 2013. In return, he agreed not to consider any other GM positions with rival clubs.

=== Atlanta Braves ===
Soon after his Rangers contract expired, the Atlanta Braves announced Hart had signed with the organization as senior advisor for baseball operations, similar to the position Hart held with the Rangers. Hart and long-time Braves executive John Schuerholz had been friends since long before the Braves and Indians met in the 1995 World Series.

On September 22, 2014, Hart was named as the Braves interim general manager after the Braves released incumbent Frank Wren.

On October 23, 2014, the Braves promoted Hart to president of baseball operations. The team, at the time stuck in the lower reaches of the National League East Division, was in the midst of a "reset" which saw them significantly strengthen their young pitching talent, though the rebuild came at a cost. Major League Baseball began to investigate the club's practices in signing amateur players from international markets. The probe resulted in the resignation and subsequent lifetime ban of Hart's subordinate, general manager John Coppolella, who was later reinstated, and the one-year suspension of the club's scouting director. Hart was not directly implicated in nor sanctioned for the scandal; however, he resigned in its wake on November 17, 2017. The following season, 2018, saw the Braves improve significantly on the field, winning 90 games (an 18-game upswing from 2017) to capture the division championship under their new management team.

== Managerial Record ==
Team	Year	Regular season					Postseason			
Team	Year	Games	Won	Lost	Win %	Finish	Won	Lost	Win %	Result
CLE	1989	19	8	11	.421	(interim)	–	–	–	
Total		19	8	11	.421		0	0	–	

== Personal life ==
Hart and his wife Sandi have been married since 1970.

== Awards ==
- All-American honors - 1969
- Appalachian League Manager of the Year – 1982
- International League Manager of the Year – 1986
- Sporting News Major League Executive of the Year - 1994 and 1995
- Elected to Winter Park High School's (Florida) athletic hall of fame - 2002

Sporting positions
Preceded by Cal Ripken Sr.	Baltimore Orioles Third Base Coach; 1988	Succeeded by Cal Ripken Sr.
Preceded by Hank Peters	Cleveland Indians General Manager; 1991–2001	Succeeded by Mark Shapiro
Preceded by Doug Melvin	Texas Rangers General Manager; 2001–2005	Succeeded by Jon Daniels
Preceded by Frank Wren	Atlanta Braves President of Baseball Operations; 2014–2015	Succeeded by John Coppolella
