= Dave Johnson (1980s–1990s pitcher) =

American baseball player (born 1959)

- Pitcher
- Born: October 24, 1959 (age 66); Baltimore, Maryland, U.S.
- Batted: Right Threw: Right

MLB debut
- May 29, 1987, for the Pittsburgh Pirates

Last MLB appearance
- September 19, 1993, for the Detroit Tigers

MLB statistics
- Win–loss record: 22–25
- Earned run average: 5.11
- Strikeouts: 143
- Stats at Baseball Reference

Teams
- Pittsburgh Pirates (1987); Baltimore Orioles (1989–1991); Detroit Tigers (1993)

David Wayne Johnson (born October 24, 1959) is an American former professional baseball pitcher who spent five seasons in Major League Baseball (MLB) with the Pittsburgh Pirates (1987), Baltimore Orioles (1989–1991) and Detroit Tigers (1993). He has been a baseball analyst with the Mid-Atlantic Sports Network (MASN) and the Orioles Radio Network since 2006.

Johnson had an emergency start at SkyDome on September 30, 1989, in the regular season's penultimate game, which the Orioles needed to win to extend the AL East championship race by at least one day. Pressed into service as a result of Pete Harnisch accidentally stepping on a nail while returning to his hotel room the previous night, he allowed two hits in seven innings before being subbed out after walking Nelson Liriano to start the eighth with the Orioles leading 3–1. The Toronto Blue Jays scored three times in that inning and won both the game 4–3 and the AL East title. Johnson was the starting and losing pitcher in Wilson Álvarez's 7–0 no-hitter at Memorial Stadium on August 11, 1991.

Johnson wrote a Guideposts article titled "Against the Odds," which appeared in the May 1990 issue of the magazine (pp 2–5). His son Steve pitched for the Orioles and the Seattle Mariners.
