= Greg Biagini =

American baseball player, coach, and manager (1952–2003)

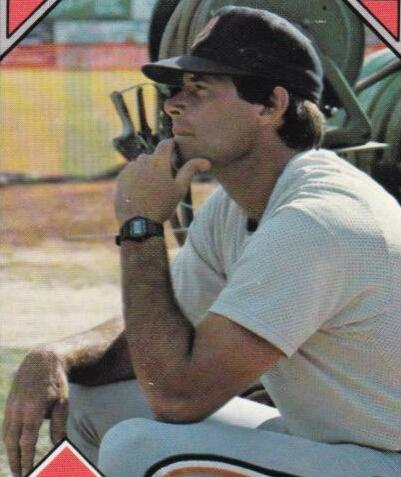
- Biagini with the Charlotte Knights c. 1988
- First baseman / Hitting coach
- Born: March 12, 1952; Chicago, Illinois, U.S.
- Died: October 3, 2003 (aged 51); Oklahoma City, Oklahoma, U.S.
- Batted: Left Threw: Right
- Stats at Baseball Reference

Teams
- As coach: Baltimore Orioles (1992–1994)

Gregory Peter Biagini (March 12, 1952 – October 3, 2003) was an American player, coach and manager in minor league baseball and a hitting coach for the Baltimore Orioles of Major League Baseball (MLB). During his playing career, he was listed at 6 feet 2 inches (1.88 m) and 220 pounds (100 kg), while batting left-handed and throwing right-handed.

== Career ==
A native of Chicago, Biagini attended Glenbrook North High School in Northbrook, Illinois, then played varsity baseball, varsity football, and club ice hockey at Iowa State University. He was selected in the 12th round of the 1973 MLB draft by the Montreal Expos, and signed with the team in mid-June.

During his 10-year professional baseball career, 1973–1982, Biagini played seven seasons in the farm systems of Montreal and the Seattle Mariners, and five seasons in the Mexican League.With Los Indios de Juárez get the Mexican league championship in 1982. His longest stint was with the Double-A Québec Carnavals during part of 1974 and all of 1975–1977, and he later reached the Triple-A level, playing in the Pacific Coast League during 1978 and 1979. In his seven seasons with the Montreal and Seattle organizations, he compiled a .257 batting average with 51 home runs and 282 RBIs in 594 games. Primarily a first baseman (246 games), he also made appearances as an outfielder (152 games), third baseman (116 games), catcher (21 games), and second baseman (1 game).

Biagini turned his hand to managing in 1983 with the Bluefield Orioles of the rookie-level Appalachian League. He managed in the minor leagues for 14 seasons (1983–1991; 1995–1999) for Baltimore and the Texas Rangers, including eight seasons at the Triple-A level. He compiled a record of 937 wins and 923 losses for a .504 winning percentage. Two of his teams won Triple-A-level championships; the 1990 Rochester Red Wings of the International League and the 1996 Oklahoma City 89ers of the American Association.

Biagini spent three seasons (1992–1994) in the American League as the major league hitting coach for the Orioles during the managerial term of Johnny Oates. Biagini was later with the Boston Red Sox organization, as a roving minor league batting instructor in 2000, and as an advance scout in 2001. In 2002, he helped run a youth baseball complex in Edmond, Oklahoma.

Biagini died in 2003 at age 51 from kidney cancer in Oklahoma City, Oklahoma. His son, Tanner, later played two seasons for the Tampa Bay Rays organization as a corner infielder.

Preceded by Johnny Oates	Rochester Red Wings manager 1989–1991	Succeeded by Jerry Narron
Preceded by Tommy McCraw	Baltimore Orioles hitting coach 1992–1994	Succeeded by Lee May
Preceded by Bobby Jones	Oklahoma City 89ers/Oklahoma RedHawks manager 1995–1999	Succeeded by DeMarlo Hale
