= Randy Milligan =

American baseball player (born 1961)

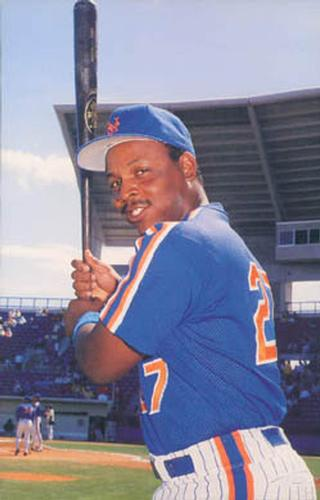
- First baseman
- Born: November 27, 1961 (age 64); San Diego, California, U.S.
- Batted: Right Threw: Right

MLB debut
- September 12, 1987, for the New York Mets

Last MLB appearance
- August 11, 1994, for the Montreal Expos

MLB statistics
- Batting average: .261
- Home runs: 70
- Runs batted in: 284
- Stats at Baseball Reference

Teams
- New York Mets (1987); Pittsburgh Pirates (1988); Baltimore Orioles (1989–1992); Cincinnati Reds (1993); Cleveland Indians (1993); Montreal Expos (1994)

Randall Andre Milligan (born November 27, 1961) is an American former Major League Baseball first baseman who played from 1987 to 1994. He is currently a scout with the Baltimore Orioles of the Major League Baseball (MLB). Milligan is nicknamed "Moose".

In 1987, Milligan won the International League batting title with a .326 BA and was tops in runs scored with 99 and in RBIs with 103. His 29 home runs ranked third in the league, missing the Triple Crown by two home runs. He was the league's MVP, Rookie of the Year, and All-Star first baseman.

Milligan's game-winning double scoring Cal Ripken Jr. on June 17, 1991, is shown in the Oscar-nominated movie A Few Good Men.
