= Rochester Red Wings =

- Founded in 1899; Rochester, New York

Team logo	Cap insignia

Minor league affiliations
- Class: Triple-A (1946–present)
- Previous classes: Double-A (1912–1945); Class A (1899–1911)
- League: International League (1912–present)
- Division: East Division
- Previous leagues: Eastern League (1899–1911)

Major league affiliations
- Team: Washington Nationals (2021–present)
- Previous teams: Minnesota Twins (2003–2020); Baltimore Orioles (1961–2002); St. Louis Cardinals (1929–1960)

Minor league titles
- League titles (20): 1899; 1901; 1909; 1910; 1911; 1928; 1929; 1930; 1931; 1939; 1952; 1955; 1956; 1964; 1971; 1974; 1988; 1990; 1997; 2026
- Division titles (5): 1988; 1990; 1993; 1995; 1997
- Second-half titles (1): 2026
- Wild card berths (2): 2006; 2013

Team data
- Name: Rochester Red Wings (1929–present)
- Previous names: Rochester Tribe (1922–1928); Rochester Colts (1921); Rochester Hustlers (1908–1920); Rochester Bronchos (1899–1907)
- Colors: Red, yellow, black, white
- Mascots: Spikes and Mittsy
- Ballpark: ESL Ballpark (1997–present)
- Previous parks: Silver Stadium (1929–1996); Bay Street Ball Grounds (1908–1928); Culver Field (1899–1907)
- Owner/ Operator: Rochester Community Baseball, Inc.
- General manager: Dan Mason
- Manager: Matthew LeCroy
- Website: milb.com/rochester

The Rochester Red Wings are a Minor League Baseball team of the International League and the Triple-A affiliate of the Washington Nationals. They are located in Rochester, New York, and play their home games at ESL Ballpark, located in downtown Rochester. Founded in 1899, they are the oldest continuously operating sports franchise in North America below the major league level.

Since the widespread adoption of the minor league farm system in the 1920s, the Red Wings have been affiliated with four Major League Baseball clubs, an unusually stable series of relationships. They were the top farm team of the St. Louis Cardinals for 32 years (1929–1960), Baltimore Orioles for 42 years (1961–2002), and Minnesota Twins for 18 years (2003–2020). They then became the Triple-A affiliate of the Nationals in 2021.

The franchise played from 1929 through 1996 at Silver Stadium (called Red Wing Stadium from 1929 to 1968) and moved to Frontier Field in 1997, now called ESL Ballpark.

The Red Wings, along with the Pawtucket Red Sox, hold the record for the longest professional baseball game, lasting a total of 33 innings and 8 hours, 25 minutes over the course of three different days. The game was held at Pawtucket's McCoy Stadium, beginning on April 18, 1981. It was suspended just after 4 a.m. the next morning, and Rochester lost, 3–2, when the game resumed on June 23, 1981.

== Baseball in Rochester ==
Baseball in Rochester dates back to 1877 with the "Rochesters" of the International Association, and Rochester has had a franchise in the league now known as the International League as early as 1885.

According to Rochester sports historian Douglas Brei, only six franchises in the history of North American professional sports have been playing in the same city and same league continuously and uninterrupted since the 19th century: the Rochester Red Wings, Chicago Cubs, Cincinnati Reds, Philadelphia Phillies, Pittsburgh Pirates and St. Louis Cardinals. He also reports that the Red Wings and the Hamilton Tiger-Cats of the Canadian Football League are the only two franchises in North American professional sports to have captured a league championship (Note: The IL Regular Season Pennant symbolized the League Champion until the Governors' Cup was established in 1933. Since 1933, the IL has officially recognized both the Pennant Winner and the Governors' Cup as League Champions. The Red Wings captured Governors' Cups in every decade since it was established except the 1940s, a decade in which they won the IL Pennant in 1940. Since the IL was separated into divisions in 1988, most people have come to consider the Governors' Cup winner to be the league champion, although in the early years most still considered the Pennant Winner to be the true league champion. The league still officially recognizes both titlists as champions.) in every decade of the 20th century.

== Franchise history ==
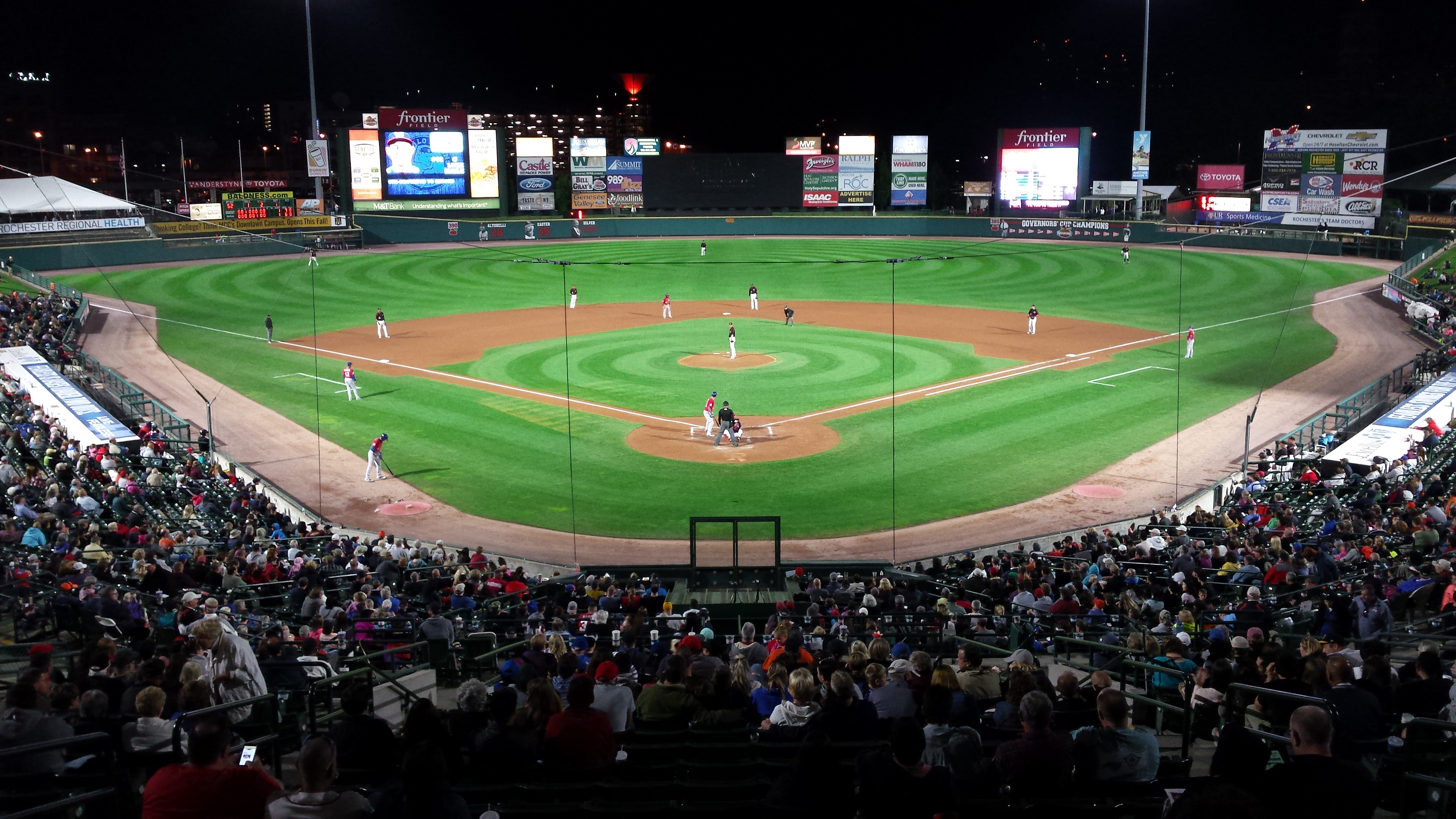
Red Wings at bat against the Buffalo Bisons in August 2017

=== Early history (1899–1928) ===
The current franchise has been playing in Rochester since 1899, when the team was known as the Rochester Bronchos and won the Eastern League championship in its inaugural season.

=== Cardinals era (1929–1960) ===
The Red Wings became the Triple-A affiliate of the St. Louis Cardinals in 1929. Aside from the affiliation, the Cardinals also owned the Wings and their stadium, then known as Red Wing Stadium. The early years of the Cardinals and Red Wings saw the Red Wings very much a power house, not unlike their parent club. The team was managed by Billy Southworth (who split time managing the team in 1929 with Bill McKechnie), and from 1929 to 1931, the team won the International League championship. In a true statement of how dominant a team they were, they won 103 games in 1929, 105 games in 1930, and 101 games in 1931. The team remained competitive for many years, with 1935 and 1937 being the only years that they lost more games than they won. The return of Billy Southworth in 1939 brought another league championship to Rochester.

Lean times were ahead for Rochester, with the 1940s finding the Red Wings on the bottom half of the standings. Even former famed pitcher Burleigh Grimes could not change the team's fortunes. He lasted a little more than a season and a half when he was replaced by Bennie Borgmann. The team won three more league championships in the Cardinals era, those coming in 1952, 1955, and 1956. In the fall of 1956, the Cardinals ceased to operate the Red Wings and put both the team and the stadium up for sale. In response, Morrie Silver, a Rochester businessman, formed Rochester Community Baseball, Inc. (RCB) and spearheaded a drive to sell shares in RCB to raise money to buy the Red Wings and Red Wing Stadium to ensure that the franchise would remain in Rochester. The attempt was successful as RCB purchased both entities from the Cardinals on February 27, 1957, in an event that was dubbed the "72 Day Miracle". RCB, composed of fans of the team as shareholders, continues to own and operate the club to this day, making the Red Wings one of two current American professional sports franchises that are publicly owned. The Green Bay Packers of the National Football League are the most notable example of this distinction.

In 1959, the Red Wings were involved in one of minor league baseball's most infamous games. While playing in Havana, Cuba, the Red Wings' July 25 game against the Havana Sugar Kings was interrupted at midnight by gunfire and fireworks in celebration of the 26th of July Movement. Rochester's Frank Verdi, standing in as third-base coach in place of manager Cot Deal, who had been ejected earlier in the game, was grazed by a bullet, as was Leo Cárdenas, the Sugar Kings' shortstop. Neither player was seriously injured, but both the game and then the series were canceled.

The Wings remained St. Louis' affiliate until 1960, when the Red Wings moved on to become the top farm club of the Baltimore Orioles.

=== Orioles era (1961–2002) ===
After six straight fourth-place finishes, and early exits from the playoffs, the Red Wings dismissed Clyde King, a hold over from the Cardinals era, as manager of the team, and named Darrell Johnson in his place. Johnson never managed a finish better than fourth during his tenure, however, in 1964, with an 82–72 record, Johnson's Red Wings managed to win yet another championship. He was replaced by Earl Weaver, who showed great promise as a manager. After two seasons, Weaver was brought up to manage the Baltimore Orioles, and he was replaced by Billy DeMars, who lasted one season before being replaced by Cal Ripken Sr. After two seasons, Ripken was replaced by Joe Altobelli. Red Wing Stadium was renamed Silver Stadium in honor of Morrie Silver on August 19, 1968. From 1971 to 1976, the Red Wings never missed the playoffs, capturing two more league titles in the process in 1971 and 1974. Altobelli returned to the Red Wings after his retirement from the coaching ranks, serving as general manager from late 1991 to 1994 and then as part of the radio broadcasting team through 2008.

1978 was a terrible season for the Red Wings, as the club had three managers, Ken Boyer, Al Widmar, and Frank Robinson. The team finished 68–72. Robinson was replaced by Doc Edwards, who managed to get the team to the playoffs in 1980, but could not manage a league title. Edwards was soon gone, replaced by Lance Nicholls, who in turn, was replaced by former Tidewater Tides manager Frank Verdi. The team did horribly under Verdi, and was mainly stocked with cast off former major leaguers, career minor league players, and very few prospects. The only bona fide major league prospect on the team during this lean period was Larry Sheets, who was mainly a journeyman hitter during his career.

Verdi was fired midway through 1985, with the Red Wings at 18–40. Under his replacement, first base coach Mark Wiley, the Red Wings went 40–41 the rest of the season.

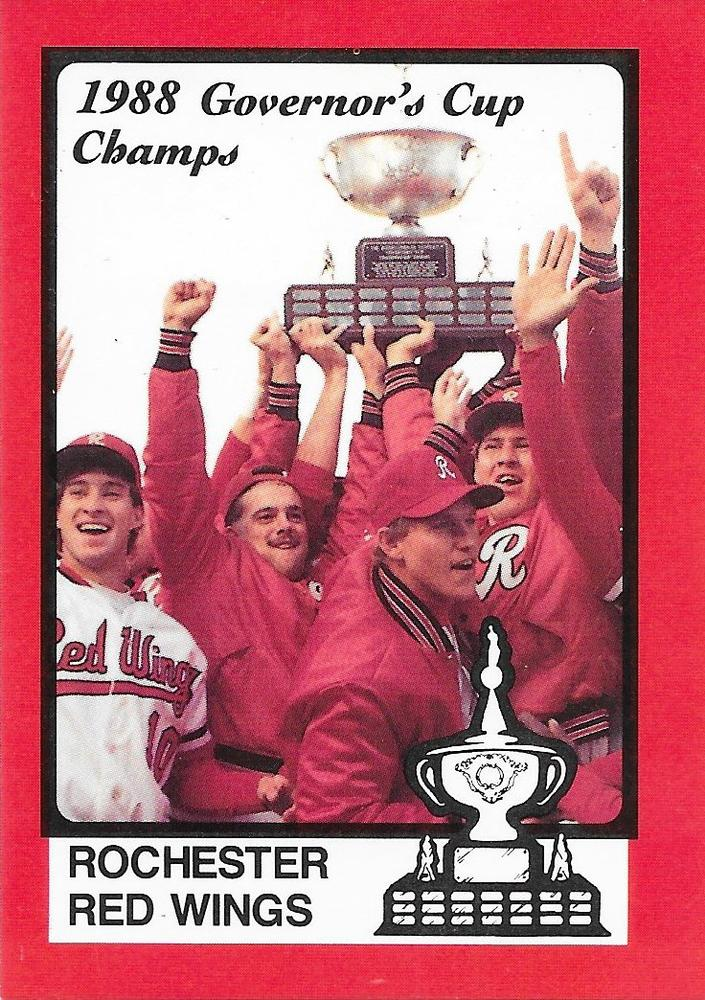
Red Wings players lifting the Governor's Cup in 1988

There was a return to glory, when the Red Wings named John Hart as the new manager. He was able to guide the team into the playoffs during his two-year stint, but none resulted in a championship. However, Hart impressed the Orioles, and he was soon off to the majors. His replacement was former New York Yankees catcher Johnny Oates. Oates won the league title in his first year and only year at the helm. His replacement was Greg Biagini. In 1990, Biagini led a loaded Red Wings team, which featured future Red Sox hero Curt Schilling, to the league championship.

In 1993, the Red Wings, guided by manager Bob Miscik, reached the International League finals but lost to the Charlotte Knights in five games.

In 1997, the Red Wings moved into the new Frontier Field in downtown Rochester after 68 seasons at Silver Stadium on the city's northeast side. That same year, manager Marv Foley led the Wings to a league title.

In 2000, during the team's fourth year at the stadium, the Red Wings played host to the Triple-A All-Star Game.

Rochester won six Governors' Cup titles during their 42-year affiliation with the Orioles, with the last coming in 1997. The team's fortunes began to decline by 1999, though, as the product on the field slipped in quality. By 2002, the fifth consecutive losing season for Rochester and what was the last year of the player development agreement between Baltimore and Rochester, the team's record slipped to a league-worst 55–89. The Red Wings' affiliation with the Orioles ended when it signed a working agreement with the Minnesota Twins on September 17, 2002.

=== Twins era (2003–2020) ===
The Red Wings' first season as the Twins' Triple-A affiliate was the team's sixth consecutive losing season. Beginning in 2004, however, the team began to turn their fortunes around. In both 2004 and 2005, the Red Wings finished in second place in the North Division with records of 73–71 and 75–69, respectively. The turnaround was capped in 2006 when Rochester, now under the leadership of Stan Cliburn, advanced to the International League playoffs as the Wild Card with a record of 79–64. The Red Wings then beat the Scranton/Wilkes-Barre Red Barons three games to one in the best-of-five semifinal series but lost to the Toledo Mud Hens in five games, three games to two, in the best-of-five Governors' Cup series.

Rochester followed up their run to the 2006 Governors' Cup Finals by posting a winning record in each of the next two seasons, bringing the streak of consecutive winning seasons to five. In 2008, the team went 74–70 after being as far as 13 games under .500 at one point (19–32 on May 25). The streak was snapped in 2009 after the team finished 70–74. On September 21, 2009, the Minnesota Twins announced that they would not renew manager Stan Cliburn's contract for the 2010 season. According to Twins farm director Jim Rantz, the change was made as part of an "overall directional change that is being implemented throughout the minor-league system." Former New Britain Rock Cats manager Tom Nieto was Cliburn's replacement. Nieto was fired at the close of the 2011 season after leading the Red Wings to their first back-to-back 90-loss seasons since 1903–04.

On November 25, 2011 Gene Glynn was announced as the new Red Wings manager for 2012. The 2012 season saw the Red Wings scratch out a .500 record, considered a vast improvement over the Nieto years. With Glynn continuing as manager, the 2013 Wings got off to a dismal 2–11 start, but slowly improved before turning red-hot in July. At some points they led the North Division, but a late surge by Pawtucket relegated the Wings to a fight for the IL's lone wild card spot. They secured the wild card on the last day of the season, based on a tiebreaker with the Norfolk Tides, leading the Wings to their first postseason appearance since 2006. The following season's playoff push came down to the final series of the year in Pawtucket, but a loss on August 31 put them out of the picture for good.

After the 2014 season, Gene Glynn was promoted to become the third base coach for the major league Minnesota Twins.

To replace Glynn, the Red Wings announced on January 30, 2015, that former Chicago Cubs' manager Mike Quade would be taking over for the 2015 season, a position he retained for three years through the 2017 campaign.

On January 17, 2018 former MLB catcher, coach and manager Joel Skinner was named as the 45th manager of the team.

The start of the 2020 season was postponed due to the COVID-19 pandemic before ultimately being cancelled on June 30.

On November 10, 2020, Twins management disclosed to the Red Wings that they would be discontinuing their partnership as part of the broad changes in the minor league system for the 2021 season and beyond.

=== Nationals era (2021–present) ===
Beginning with the 2021 season, the Red Wings became the Triple-A affiliate of the Washington Nationals. As a further result of Major League Baseball's restructuring of Minor League Baseball in 2021, the Red Wings were organized into the Triple-A East. Under former major league catcher and veteran minor league coach Matthew LeCroy, Rochester ended the 2021 season tied for fifth place in the Northeastern Division with a 47–69 record. No playoffs were held to determine a league champion; instead, the team with the best regular-season record was declared the winner. However, 10 games that had been postponed from the start of the season were reinserted into the schedule as a postseason tournament called the Triple-A Final Stretch in which all 30 Triple-A clubs competed for the highest winning percentage. Rochester finished the tournament in 27th place with a 2–8 record. In 2022, the Triple-A East became known as the International League, the name historically used by the regional circuit prior to the 2021 reorganization. The 2023 Red Wings finished 8th in the 10-team IL East Division with a 66–80 record under Matt LeCroy. In 2026, the Red Wings finished first in the International League second-half standings, qualifying them for the postseason for the first time since 2013. They went on to defeat the Memphis Redbirds, 2–1, in a best-of-three series to win their first International League championship in 29 years. Rochester met the Oklahoma City Comets, champions of the Pacific Coast League, in the Triple-A National Championship Game to determine an overall champion of the classification. The Red Wings were defeated, 5–3, in 10 innings.

== Titles ==
The Red Wings have played for the Governors' Cup, the championship of the International League, 22 times, winning 11.

- 1933 – Lost to Buffalo
- 1934 – Lost to Toronto
- 1939 – Defeated Newark
- 1950 – Lost to Baltimore
- 1952 – Defeated Montréal
- 1953 – Lost to Montréal
- 1955 – Defeated Toronto
- 1956 – Defeated Toronto
- 1960 – Lost to Toronto
- 1961 – Lost to Buffalo
- 1964 – Defeated Syracuse
- 1971 – Defeated Tidewater
- 1974 – Defeated Syracuse
- 1982 – Lost to Tidewater
- 1986 – Lost to Richmond
- 1988 – Defeated Tidewater
- 1990 – Defeated Columbus
- 1993 – Lost to Charlotte
- 1996 – Lost to Columbus
- 1997 – Defeated Columbus
- 2006 – Lost to Toledo
- 2026 – Defeated Memphis

== Year-by-year records ==
Year	Aff.	League	Div.	Finish	W	L	W%	Playoffs	Avg. attendance	Manager
1960	St. Louis Cardinals	International League		3rd	81	73	.526	Lost in finals	2,844	Clyde King
1961	Baltimore Orioles	International League		4th	77	78	.497	Lost in finals	2,838	Clyde King
1962	Orioles	International League		4th	82	72	.532	Lost in 1st Round	3,535	Clyde King
1963	Orioles	International League		7th	75	76	.497	Did not qualify	3,602	Darrell Johnson
1964	Orioles	International League		4th	82	72	.532	League Champions	3,534	Darrell Johnson
1965	Orioles	International League		5th	73	74	.497	Did not qualify	3,028	Darrell Johnson
1966	Orioles	International League		1st	83	64	.565	Lost in 1st Round	N/A	Earl Weaver
1967	Orioles	International League		2nd	80	61	.567	Lost in 1st Round	4,305	Earl Weaver
1968	Orioles	International League		3rd	77	69	.527	Lost in 1st Round	3,336	Billy DeMars
1969	Orioles	International League		5th	71	69	.507	Did not qualify	3,828	Cal Ripken Sr.
1970	Orioles	International League		3rd	76	64	.543	Lost in 1st Round	4,625	Cal Ripken Sr.
1971	Orioles	International League		1st	86	54	.614	League Champions	5,167	Joe Altobelli
1972	Orioles	International League		4th	76	68	.528	Lost in 1st Round	4,123	Joe Altobelli
1973	Orioles	International League	American	1st	79	67	.541	Lost in 1st Round	4,148	Joe Altobelli
1974	Orioles	International League	Northern	1st	88	56	.611	League Champions	3,746	Joe Altobelli
1975	Orioles	International League		2nd	85	56	.603	Lost in 1st Round	4,634	Joe Altobelli
1976	Orioles	International League		1st	88	50	.638	Lost in 1st Round	3,741	Joe Altobelli
1977	Orioles	International League		6th	67	73	.479	Did not qualify	3,510	Ken Boyer
1978	Orioles	International League		6th	68	72	.486	Did not qualify	3,140	Ken Boyer (5–6) / Al Widmar (5–2) / Frank Robinson (58–64)
1979	Orioles	International League		8th	53	86	.381	Did not qualify	2,878	Doc Edwards
1980	Orioles	International League		3rd	74	65	.532	Lost in 1st Round	4,211	Doc Edwards
1981	Orioles	International League		4th	69	70	.496	Lost in 1st Round	5,026	Doc Edwards
1982	Orioles	International League		4th	72	68	.514	Lost in finals	5,162	Lance Nichols
1983	Orioles	International League		6th	65	75	.464	Did not qualify	4,058	Lance Nichols
1984	Orioles	International League		8th	52	88	.371	Did not qualify	2,737	Frank Verdi
1985	Orioles	International League		7th	58	81	.417	Did not qualify	3,007	Frank Verdi (18–40) / Mark Wiley (40–41)
1986	Orioles	International League		2nd	75	63	.571	Lost in finals	4,475	John Hart
1987	Orioles	International League		3rd	74	65	.532	Lost in 1st Round	4,544	John Hart
1988	Orioles	International League	West	1st	77	64	.546	League Champions	4,267	Johnny Oates
1989	Orioles	International League	East	2nd	72	73	.497	Did not qualify	3,923	Craig Biagini
1990	Orioles	International League	East	1st	89	56	.614	League Champions	4,578	Craig Biagini
1991	Orioles	International League	East	2nd	76	68	.528	Did not qualify	4,794	Craig Biagini
1992	Orioles	International League	East	3rd	70	74	.486	Did not qualify	4,769	Jerry Narron
1993	Orioles	International League	East	1st	74	67	.525	Lost in finals	5,242	Bob Miscik
1994	Orioles	International League	East	4th	67	74	.475	Did not qualify	5,511	Bob Miscik
1995	Orioles	International League	East	1st	73	69	.514	Lost in 1st Round	5,711	Marv Foley
1996	Orioles	International League	East	2nd	72	69	.511	Lost in finals	6,008	Marv Foley
1997	Orioles	International League	East	1st	83	58	.589	League Champions	7,766	Marv Foley
1998	Orioles	International League	North	4th	70	74	.486	Did not qualify	7,470	Marv Foley
1999	Orioles	International League	North	5th	61	83	.424	Did not qualify	7,074	Dave Machemer
2000	Orioles	International League	North	5th	65	79	.451	Did not qualify	6,858	Marv Foley
2001	Orioles	International League	North	6th	60	84	.417	Did not qualify	6,410	Andy Etchenbarren
2002	Orioles	International League	North	6th	55	89	.382	Did not qualify	6,021	Andy Etchenbarren
2003	Minnesota Twins	International League	North	T-5th	68	75	.476	Did not qualify	6,334	Phil Roof
2004	Twins	International League	North	T-2nd	73	71	.507	Did not qualify	6,428	Phil Roof
2005	Twins	International League	North	3rd	75	69	.521	Did not qualify	6,853	Phil Roof (6–7) / Rich Miller (69–62)
2006	Twins	International League	North	2nd	79	64	.552	Lost in finals	6,626	Stan Cliburn
2007	Twins	International League	North	2nd	77	67	.535	Did not qualify	7,064	Stan Cliburn
2008	Twins	International League	North	3rd	74	70	.514	Did not qualify	6,913	Stan Cliburn
2009	Twins	International League	North	4th	70	74	.486	Did not qualify	6,599	Stan Cliburn
2010	Twins	International League	North	6th	49	95	.340	Did not qualify	6,600	Tom Nieto
2011	Twins	International League	North	6th	53	91	.368	Did not qualify	6,493	Tom Nieto
2012	Twins	International League	North	4th	72	72	.500	Did not qualify	6,094	Gene Glynn
2013	Twins	International League	North	2nd	77	67	.535	Lost in 1st round	6,098	Gene Glynn
2014	Twins	International League	North	4th	77	67	.535	Did not qualify	6,401	Gene Glynn
2015	Twins	International League	North	2nd	77	67	.535	Did not qualify	6,291	Mike Quade
2016	Twins	International League	North	3rd	81	63	.563	Did not qualify	6,396	Mike Quade
2017	Twins	International League	North	3rd*	80	62	.563	Did not qualify	6,553	Mike Quade
2018	Twins	International League	North	T-4th	64	76	.457	Did not qualify	6,537	Joel Skinner
2019	Twins	International League	North	4th	70	70	.500	Did not qualify	6,846	Joel Skinner
2020	Twins	International League	North	N/A	—	—	—	Season cancelled due to COVID-19	N/A	Toby Gardenhire
2021	Washington Nationals	Triple-A East	Northeast	6th	49	77	.389	No playoffs held	3,491	Matthew LeCroy
2022	Nationals	International League	East	8th	67	81	.453	Did not qualify	5,846	Matthew LeCroy
2023	Nationals	International League	East	8th	66	80	.452	Did not qualify	5,994	Matthew LeCroy
2024	Nationals	International League	East	4th	77	71	.520	Did not qualify	6,018	Matthew LeCroy
2025	Nationals	International League	East	10th	59	88	.401	Did not qualify	—	Matthew LeCroy
2026	Nationals	International League	East	1st	90	58	.608	League Champions	—	Matthew LeCroy

∗ Tied by record with Lehigh Valley IronPigs but lost in tiebreaking procedures.

== Mascots ==
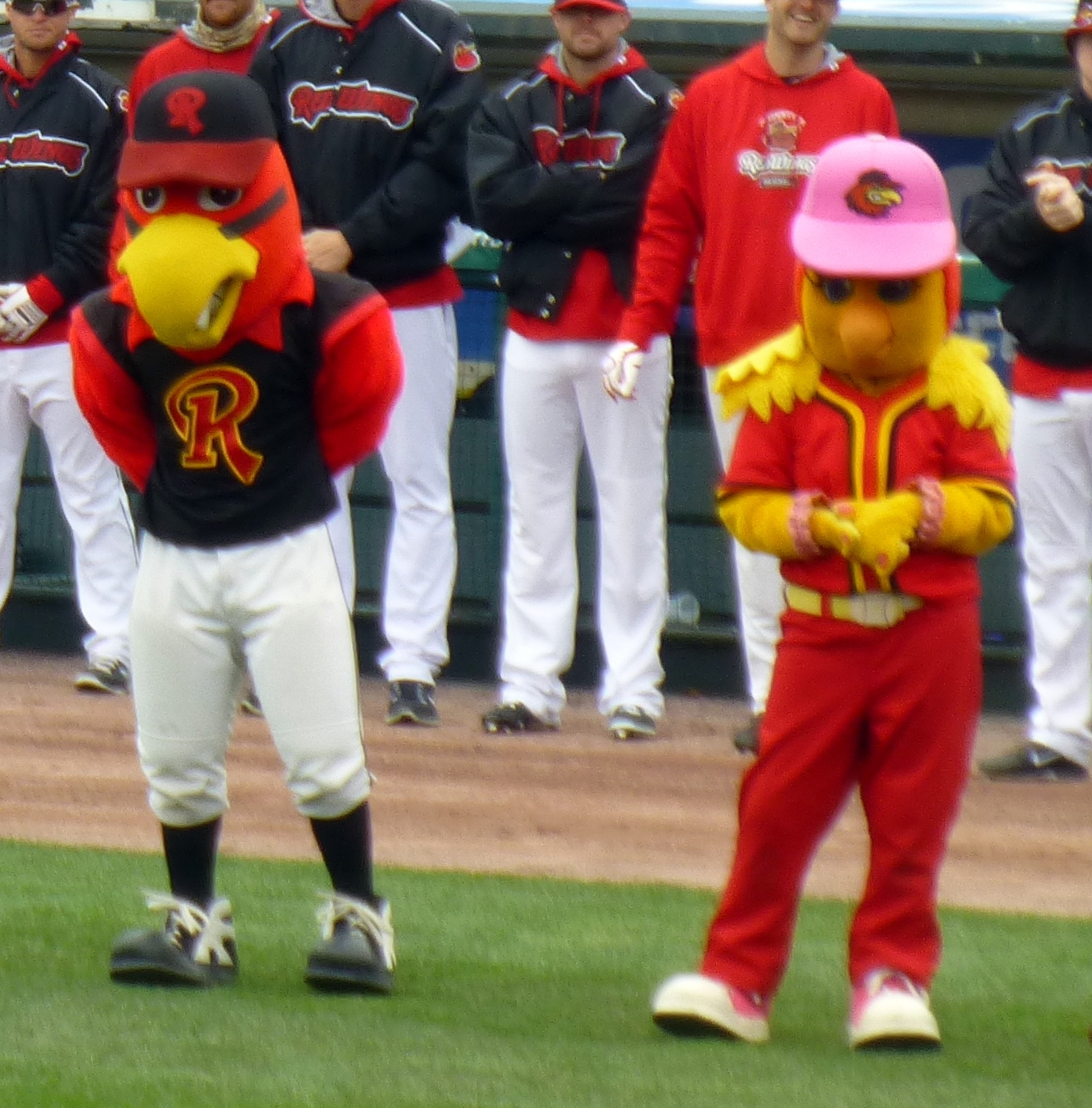
Spikes and Mittsy, mascots of the Rochester Red Wings

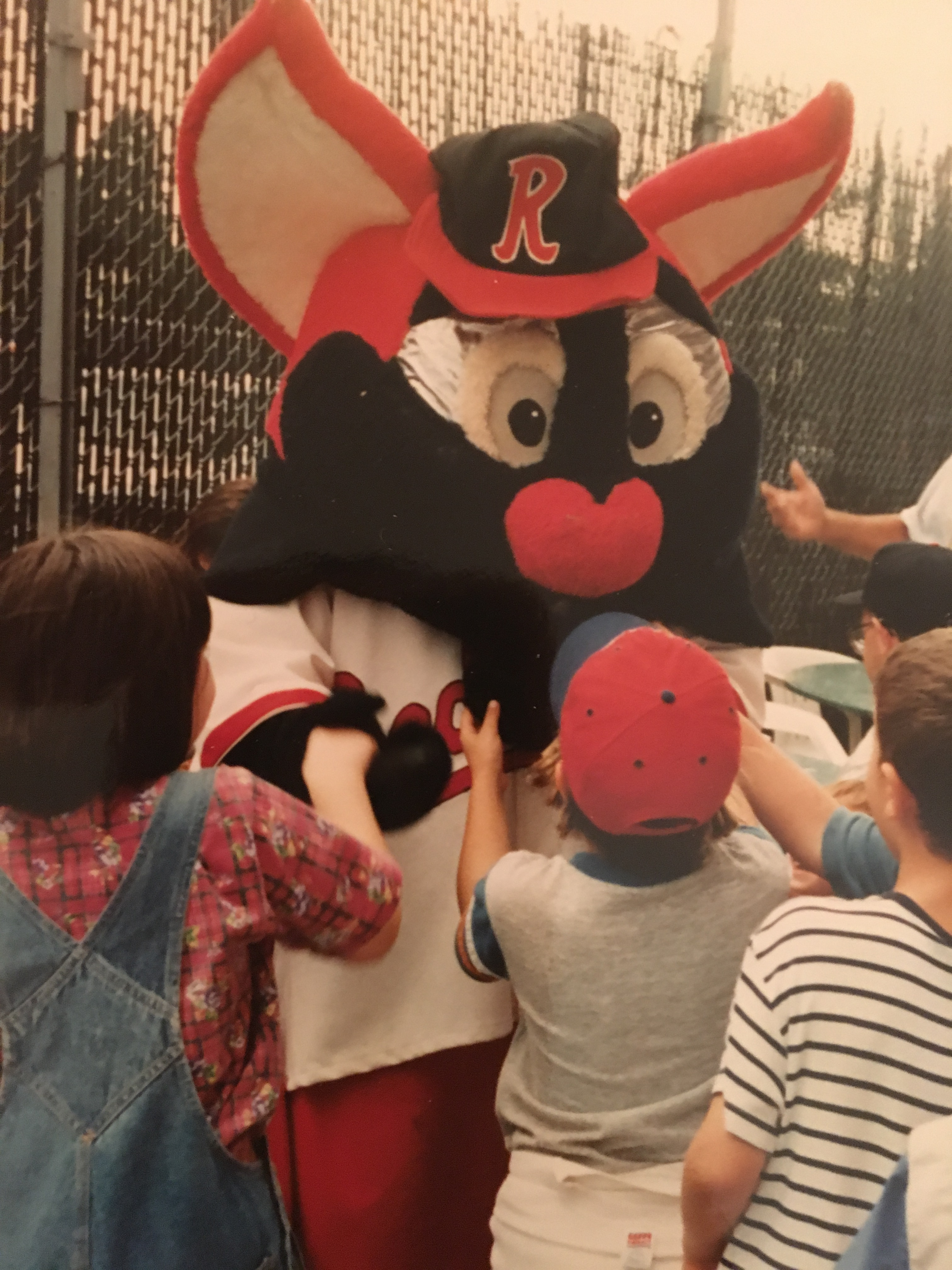
Wild Fang, Red Wings mascot from 1992 to 1997

The Rochester Red Wings' mascots are a pair of anthropomorphic birds named Spikes and Mittsy. Spikes is bright red with a yellow beak. He wears a uniform similar to that of the team. Mittsy is yellow with an orange beak and red hair. She wears a red uniform with yellow trim accompanied by two pink bracelets. Spikes was created in the off-season before the 1997 season, the same year in which the Red Wings got their new stadium, Frontier Field. The names refer to cleats or "spikes" baseball players wear and catcher's mitts, respectively. Before Spikes was created, the team mascot was a red and black bat character known as Wild Fang, who was with the team from 1992 to 1997, when he was retired once the team moved to Frontier Field.

== Roster ==
Rochester Red Wings roster
Players	Coaches/Other
Pitchers: 39 Clayton Beeter *; 28 Jake Bird *; 49 Chandler Champlain †; 59 Tom Cosgrove *; 57 Sandy Gaston; 38 Joe Glassey; 21 Ben Grable; 22 Cole Henry *; 54 Zak Kent *; 35 Max Kranick *; 20 Matt Krook; 48 Andry Lara; 55 Justin Lawrence; 40 Isaac Lyon; 47 Erick Mejia; 46 Wyatt Mills *; 41 Kyle Nicolas *; 19 Carson Palmquist *; 50 Holden Powell ~; 37 Paxton Schultz *; 46 Jared Simpson *; 44 Jarlin Susana; 23 Gus Varland *; 32 Eddy Yean *; Catchers: 16 Riley Adams; 2 Kyle Hayes ~; 4 Maxwell Romero Jr.; Infielders: 1 Phillip Glasser; 19 Buddy Kennedy *; 5 Seaver King; 22 Cortland Lawson; 7 Trey Lipscomb; 9 Liover Peguero; 14 Cayden Wallace; Outfielders: 25 Sam Petersen; 24 Andrew Pinckney *; 11 Leandro Pineda; 3 Johnathon Thomas	Manager: 45 Matthew LeCroy; Coaches: 51 Brian Daubach (hitting); 31 Anthony Deleo (quality control); 27 Travis Fitta (assistant hitting); 18 Mario Lisson (defensive); 43 Sam Narron (assistant pitching); 38 Fernando Nieve (pitching); 60-day injured list: -- Tyler Baum; 53 Levi Jordan; 7-day injured list; * On Washington Nationals 40-man roster; ~ Development list; # Rehab assignment; ∞ Reserve list; ‡ Restricted list; § Suspended list; † Temporarily inactive list; Roster updated September 22, 2026; Transactions; → More rosters: MiLB • International League; → Washington Nationals minor league players

== Achievements ==
=== Awards and honors ===
- In 1970, Roger Freed was named International League MVP along with George Kopacz of the Columbus Jets.
- In 1971, Bobby Grich was named International League MVP.
- In 1973, Jim Fuller was named International League MVP.
- In 1976, Rich Dauer was named International League MVP along with Mickey Klutts of the Syracuse Chiefs and Joe Lis of the Toledo Mud Hens.
- In 1988, Craig Worthington was named International League MVP.
- In 1994, Jeff Manto was named International League MVP.
- In 1996 and 1997, general manager Dan Mason was named International League Executive of the Year. Mason won the award a third time in 2012.
- In 1998, Rochester was named "Baseball City, U.S.A." by Baseball America.
- In 2008, team COO and chairman Naomi Silver was named Minor League Executive of the Year by Baseball America.
- In 2012, longtime team comptroller Darlene Giardina (1990–present) was named Rawlings Woman Executive of the Year by Minor League Baseball.
- In 2013, Chris Colabello was named International League MVP.

=== Retired numbers ===
The Red Wings have retired three numbers, two of which are derived from uniform numbers:

- 26: Joe Altobelli, often referred to as "Mr. Baseball" in the Rochester area. He played for the Red Wings from 1963 to 1965, coached the team in 1966, and managed the team from 1971 to 1976. As manager, "Alto" led the Red Wings to two Governors' Cup titles. Altobelli also served as the Red Wings' general manager from 1991 to 1994 and was the color commentator for all Red Wing home game broadcasts from 1998 to 2008.
- 36: Luke Easter. He played in Rochester from 1959 to his retirement in 1963, during which time he hit 67 home runs.
- 8,222: Morrie Silver. He spearheaded a successful grassroots effort to purchase the Red Wings from the St. Louis Cardinals in 1957 and subsequently served as the team president from 1957 to 1968. The number retired in his honor, 8,222, represents the original number of shareholders of Rochester Community Baseball, Inc.

Altobelli's number 26 and the number 8,222 representing Silver were both retired prior to the final regular season game at Silver Stadium on August 30, 1996. Easter's number 36 was retired by the Red Wings in 2000.

== Notable alumni ==
=== Players and on-field staff ===
- Walter Alston
- Joe Altobelli (player, manager)
- Brady Anderson
- Bob Bailor
- Jason Bartlett
- Sammy Baugh
- Don Baylor
- Steve Bechler
- Mark Belanger
- Armando Benítez
- Paul Blair
- Curt Blefary
- Mike Boddicker
- Ken Boyer (manager)
- Al Bumbry
- Enos Cabell
- Allie Clark
- Ripper Collins
- Terry Crowley
- Michael Cuddyer
- Steve Dalkowski
- Rich Dauer
- Doug DeCinces
- Steve Demeter
- Paul Derringer
- Luke Easter
- Mike Epstein
- Andy Etchebarren
- Steve Finley
- Mike Flanagan
- Jim Frey
- Kiko Garcia
- Matt Garza
- Bob Gibson
- Bobby Grich
- Jerry Hairston Jr.
- Jeffrey Hammonds
- Jim Hardin
- Pete Harnisch
- John Hart
- Chris Hoiles
- Rex Hudler
- Steve Jeltz
- Davey Johnson
- Garrett Jones
- Eddie Joost
- Jorge Julio
- Jason Kubel
- Howie Krist
- Jeff Manto
- Marty Marion
- Dennis Martínez
- Joe Mauer
- Tim McCarver
- Jose Mesa
- Johnny Mize
- Justin Morneau
- Jamie Moyer
- Eddie Murray
- Danny Murtaugh
- Stan Musial
- Mike Mussina
- Jerry Narron (manager)
- Pat Neshek
- Johnny Oates (player, manager)
- Fritz Ostermueller
- Trevor Plouffe
- Sidney Ponson
- Boog Powell
- Wilson Ramos
- Arthur Rhodes
- Billy Ripken
- Cal Ripken Jr.
- Cal Ripken Sr. (player, manager)
- Brian Roberts
- Frank Robinson (manager)
- Preacher Roe
- Goody Rosen
- Curt Schilling
- Red Schoendienst
- David Segui
- John Shelby
- Ron Shelton
- Kevin Slowey
- Billy Southworth (Manager)
- Andrés Torres
- Specs Toporcer
- Josh Towers
- Danny Valencia
- Bill Virdon
- Earl Weaver (manager)
- Phil Weintraub
- Eli Whiteside
- Alan Wiggins
- Craig Worthington
- Esteban Yan
- Gregg Zaun

=== Front office and other staff ===
- Joe Altobelli (general manager, announcer) (1998–2008 as announcer)
- Russ Brandon
- Jack Buck (announcer) (1953)
- Eric Collins (announcer) (1996)
- Joe Cullinane (announcer) (1962–74)
- Bing Devine (general manager)
- Glenn Geffner (announcer) (1994–96)
- Warren Giles
- Howie Haak (traveling secretary)
- Frank Horton (team president)
- Joe Kehoskie
- Josh Lewin (announcer) (1986–94)
- Dan Lunetta
- Dan Mason (general manager)
- Naomi Silver (chairman and COO)
- George Sisler Jr.
- Bob Socci (announcer) (1991–92)
- Pete Weber (announcer) (1982–84)
- Josh Whetzel (broadcaster) (2003–Present)
