= Juan Bell =

Dominican baseball player (1968–2016)

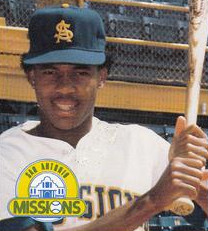
- Bell in 1988
- Infielder
- Born: March 29, 1968; San Pedro de Macorís, Dominican Republic
- Died: August 24, 2016 (aged 48); Santo Domingo, Dominican Republic
- Batted: Right Threw: Right

MLB debut
- September 6, 1989, for the Baltimore Orioles

Last MLB appearance
- August 25, 1995, for the Boston Red Sox

MLB statistics
- Batting average: .212
- Home runs: 10
- Runs batted in: 71

CPBL statistics
- Batting average: .333
- Home runs: 20
- Runs batted in: 88
- Stats at Baseball Reference

Teams
- Baltimore Orioles (1989–1991); Philadelphia Phillies (1992–1993); Milwaukee Brewers (1993); Montreal Expos (1994); Boston Red Sox (1995); Sinon Bulls (1997); Chinatrust Whales (2001)

Juan Bell Mathey (March 29, 1968 – August 24, 2016) was a Dominican professional baseball player, who played Major League Baseball from 1989 to 1995, primarily as an infielder.

== MLB career ==
=== Early career ===
Bell originally signed with the Los Angeles Dodgers in 1984 at the age of 16 and spent four seasons in its minor league system.

=== Orioles ===
Bell was acquired along with Ken Howell and Brian Holton by the Baltimore Orioles from the Dodgers for Eddie Murray on December 4, 1988. He saw his first major league action the following season, getting called up from the minor leagues in September, 1989. Between that season and 1990, he played in 13 games, mostly as a pinch runner. In 1991, he got his chance at regular playing time, splitting time at second base with Billy Ripken alongside Billy's brother, Cal Ripken Jr., the Orioles' regular shortstop. However, he hit just .172, and the next spring he lost his roster spot to Mark McLemore and was sent back to the minors.

=== Phillies ===
In August 1992, Bell was traded to the Philadelphia Phillies for infielder Steve Scarsone and was back in the majors. In 46 games, as the regular shortstop over the remainder of the season, Bell hit .204, however it was enough to allow him to stick with the big club in spring training. Once again, however, Bell's bat was not up to the task, as he hit just .200 in 65 at bats before being placed on waivers.

=== Brewers ===
Bell was claimed by the Milwaukee Brewers, who gave him his most extended shot at a regular job yet. Bell responded with what was his best season, batting .234 with career highs in home runs (5) and RBI (29). The following spring, he was released by the Brewers after they signed Jody Reed in the offseason to play second base.

=== Later career ===
In the next two seasons, Bell would get additional trials from the Montreal Expos and Boston Red Sox. He even set a career high in batting average (.278) in 1994 with the Expos, although it was in just 97 at bats. He spent most of those two seasons in the minor leagues, though, and continued to play in the minors until 1998, finishing up his career with the Syracuse SkyChiefs in the Toronto Blue Jays system. Bell ended his career with a batting average of just .212 in 329 games.

Bell played some ball from 1999 to 2000 with Elmira Pioneers of the Northern League, as well as Cafeteros de Córdoba and Campeche Piratas of the Mexican League.

== Personal life ==
Juan was the younger brother of former major league slugger George Bell. Their brother, Rolando Bell, played two seasons in the Dodgers' system as well. He had a son named Juan Bell and another son named Joanthony Bell.

Bell died of kidney disease in Santo Domingo, Dominican Republic on August 24, 2016.
