= Billy Ripken =

American baseball player (born 1964)

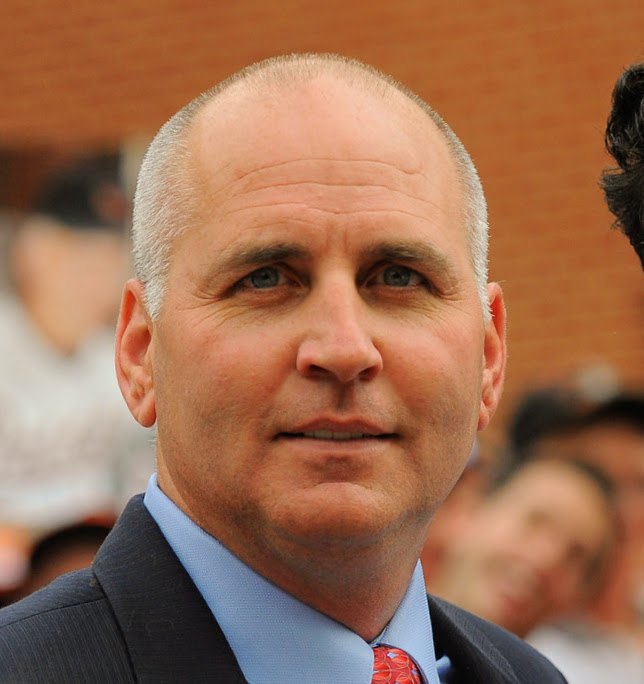
- Ripken in 2018
- Second baseman
- Born: December 16, 1964 (age 61); Havre de Grace, Maryland, U.S.
- Batted: Right Threw: Right

MLB debut
- July 11, 1987, for the Baltimore Orioles

Last MLB appearance
- July 13, 1998, for the Detroit Tigers

MLB statistics
- Batting average: .247
- Home runs: 20
- Runs batted in: 229
- Stats at Baseball Reference

Teams
- Baltimore Orioles (1987–1992); Texas Rangers (1993–1994); Cleveland Indians (1995); Baltimore Orioles (1996); Texas Rangers (1997); Detroit Tigers (1998)

William Oliver Ripken (born December 16, 1964), nicknamed "Billy the Kid", is an American former professional baseball infielder. He played in Major League Baseball (MLB) from 1987–1998 for the Baltimore Orioles (1987–1992, 1996), Texas Rangers (1993–94, 1997), Cleveland Indians (1995), and Detroit Tigers (1998). During his career, he batted and threw right-handed. He is the younger brother of Hall of Famer Cal Ripken Jr. He serves as a radio host for XM Satellite Radio and a studio analyst for MLB Network.

Born in Maryland, Ripken grew up traveling around the United States as his father, Cal Ripken Sr., was a player and coach in the Orioles' organization. After attending Aberdeen High School, Ripken was drafted by the Orioles in the 11th round of the 1982 MLB draft. He reached MLB in 1987, creating the first situation in baseball history that a father had managed two sons on the same team, as his brother played for the Orioles and his father, Cal Ripken Sr. managed the team. Ripken was a light hitter better known for his fielding skills, although he led the Orioles in batting average with a .291 mark in 1990. He served as their starting second baseman most of his first stint with the team. After the Orioles released him following the 1992 campaign, he played with four other teams (including a return to the Orioles in 1996), serving mostly as a utility infielder and never holding a starting role for very long. He played his final game in 1998 for the Detroit Tigers.

== Early life ==
Ripken was born to Cal Sr. and Violet "Vi" Ripken in Havre de Grace, Maryland. Though the Ripkens called Aberdeen, Maryland, their home, they were often on the move because of Cal Sr.'s coaching duties with the Baltimore Orioles organization. This gave Bill the chance to be around his father's teams. He attended Aberdeen High School, where he played baseball. Over his final two seasons, he did not lose a single game as a pitcher, but the infield was where he planned to spend his career.

== Minor league career ==
Before the 1982 Major League Baseball draft, Cal Jr., Bill's brother who was on his way to winning the Major League Baseball Rookie of the Year Award with the Orioles, remarked, "Billy might go pretty high in the draft. I'd love for the Orioles to take him. That would be okay, wouldn't it? Having your father and brother with the same team?" The Orioles would wind up selecting Bill in the 11th round of the draft.

Ripken began his professional career that same year with the Rookie League Bluefield Orioles, where he played mostly shortstop and third base. In 27 games, in which he totaled 45 at bats, Ripken posted a batting average of .244 with 11 hits and four runs batted in. Next season, Ripken remained at Bluefield and was used almost exclusively as a shortstop, although he also pitched the final 2/3 of a game, allowing no runs. He batted .217 with 33 hits and 13 RBI in 48 games. In 1984, he was promoted to the Hagerstown Suns of the Class A Carolina League, where he appeared in 115 games. He batted .230 with 94 hits, the first two home runs of his career, and 40 RBI while posting a .948 fielding percentage at shortstop.

Ripken's 1985 season would be split between three teams. He spent the bulk of the year with the Daytona Beach Admirals of the Class A Florida State League, batting .230 with 51 hits and 18 RBI. He also appeared in 14 games with Hagerstown and 18 games with the Double-A Charlotte O's of the Southern League, batting .255 and .137, respectively, with those teams. He did not hit a home run in 1985. He played the whole 1986 season for Charlotte, batting .268 with 142 hits, 20 doubles, three triples, five home runs, and 62 RBI in 141 games. In addition, he led the Southern League in four fielding categories. In 1987, he was called up to the Triple-A Rochester Red Wings of the International League, where he played 74 games, batting .286.

== Major League Baseball career ==
=== Baltimore Orioles (1987–1992) ===
In July 1987, the Orioles released Rick Burleson and called Ripken up to replace him. He debuted on July 11, creating the first instance in baseball history in which a father managed two sons on the same major league team, as his father was the Orioles' manager and his brother was their shortstop. While with the Orioles, Ripken played alongside his brother, Cal Ripken Jr.; he was managed by his father, Cal Sr., from 1987–1988. Billy did not have a hit in his debut but picked up his first hit as one of two against Charlie Leibrandt of the Kansas City Royals on July 16. Three days later, Ripken hit his first home run against Bud Black, helping the Orioles defeat Kansas City 5–1. Ripken finished his inaugural season with a .308 batting average, two home runs, and 72 hits in 58 games.

Billy was given the Orioles' second base role in 1988; with his brother, Cal Jr., at shortstop, the pair formed the Orioles' double play combination. Six games into the season, Cal Sr. was fired as the Orioles' manager, the quickest managerial firing in major league history. Immediately after, Billy switched his uniform number from 3 to his father's 7, saying, "I just didn't want to see anybody else wear it." The Orioles lost their first 21 games of the season en route to a 54–107 finish. A picture of Billy appeared on the cover of Sports Illustrated on May 2, 1988, used in an emblematic fashion to symbolize frustration at the team's struggles. In his rookie season, Billy played a career-high 150 games, batting .207 with 106 hits, two home runs, 34 RBI, and a .984 fielding percentage.

A broken hand caused Ripken to miss the first two weeks of 1989, but he took over the job again on April 19, holding it until a strained right shoulder sidelined him in late August. Though Ripken returned from the injury on September 7, he did not see much playing time for the rest of the season. On August 7, in a 9–8 win over the Boston Red Sox, Billy and Cal Combined for seven hits, the American League (AL) record for brothers in the same game. In 115 games, Ripken batted .239 with 76 hits, two home runs, 26 RBI, and a .981 fielding percentage, which was third in the AL.

In 1990, with the exception of a stretch in August in which he was hurt, he batted .291, the highest total of his career and a mark that led the Orioles in 1990. He also tied with his brother for the team lead in doubles (28) Defensively, Ripken finished fifth among AL second basemen with a .987 fielding percentage and led AL hitters with 17 sacrifice hits. Billy and Cal committed a total of 11 errors, the fewest in major league history among second baseman-shortstop combinations that appeared in at least two-thirds of their team's games at their respective positions.

In 1991, Ripken missed several games between July 14 and August 17 with an injury. His batting average dropped to .216 that year, and he had 62 hits, no home runs, and 14 RBI in 104 games. He had a .986 fielding percentage, but that did not qualify him for a spot in the top five in the AL. He, Tim Hulett, and Juan Bell combined for the lowest on-base percentage in the major leagues at any position (.240) and became the subject of trade rumors after the season. While his brother won the Major League Baseball Most Valuable Player Award, the Orioles finished sixth.

Mark McLemore shared second base with Ripken in 1992. Ripken hit what would be a career-high four home runs, batting .230 with 76 hits and 36 RBI in 111 games. He had a .993 fielding percentage. After the 1992 season, the Orioles acquired Harold Reynolds, which signaled the end of Ripken's days with the team. The Orioles officially ended his tenure by releasing him after the season.

==== 1989 baseball card ====
Detail on Billy Ripken's 1989 baseball card.

In 1989, Ripken's Fleer card showed him holding a bat with the expletive "FUCK FACE" written in plain view on the knob of the bat. Fleer subsequently rushed to correct the error and, in their haste, released versions in which the text was scrawled over with a marker, whited out with correction fluid, and also airbrushed. On the final, corrected version, Fleer obscured the offensive words with a black box (this was the version included in all factory sets). Both the original card and many of the corrected versions have become collector's items as a result. There are at least ten different variations of this card. Once news got out, the original card's price went up to several hundred dollars.

Years later, Ripken admitted to having written the expletive on the bat; however, he claimed he did it to distinguish it as a batting practice bat, and did not intend to use it for the card. He went on to say, "I can't believe the people at Fleer couldn't catch that. I mean, they certainly have to have enough proofreaders to see it. I think not only did they see it, they enhanced it. That writing on that bat is way too clear. I don't write that neat. I think they knew that once they saw it, they could use the card to create an awful lot of stir." Some collectors list the card as the "Rick Face" card, as they claim that the proximity between the letters appears to make the word "FUCK" look similar to "RICK".

=== Texas Rangers (1993–1994) ===
The Texas Rangers signed Ripken in 1993 to play second base after Jeff Frye severely injured his knee. He began the season as their second baseman, but after batting .204 to open the year, he lost the role in May to Doug Strange. On June 4, he returned to the starting lineup at shortstop. He suffered a pulled left hamstring on June 20, however, an injury that kept him out for the rest of the season except for a few games in September. In 50 games, he batted what would be a career-low .189, with 25 hits, four extra-base hits (all doubles), and 11 RBI. Ripken became a free agent after the season but re-signed with the Rangers on December 18. He batted .309 for them but was used sparingly as a utility player, making 32 appearances. After the season, he again became a free agent.

=== Cleveland Indians (1995) ===
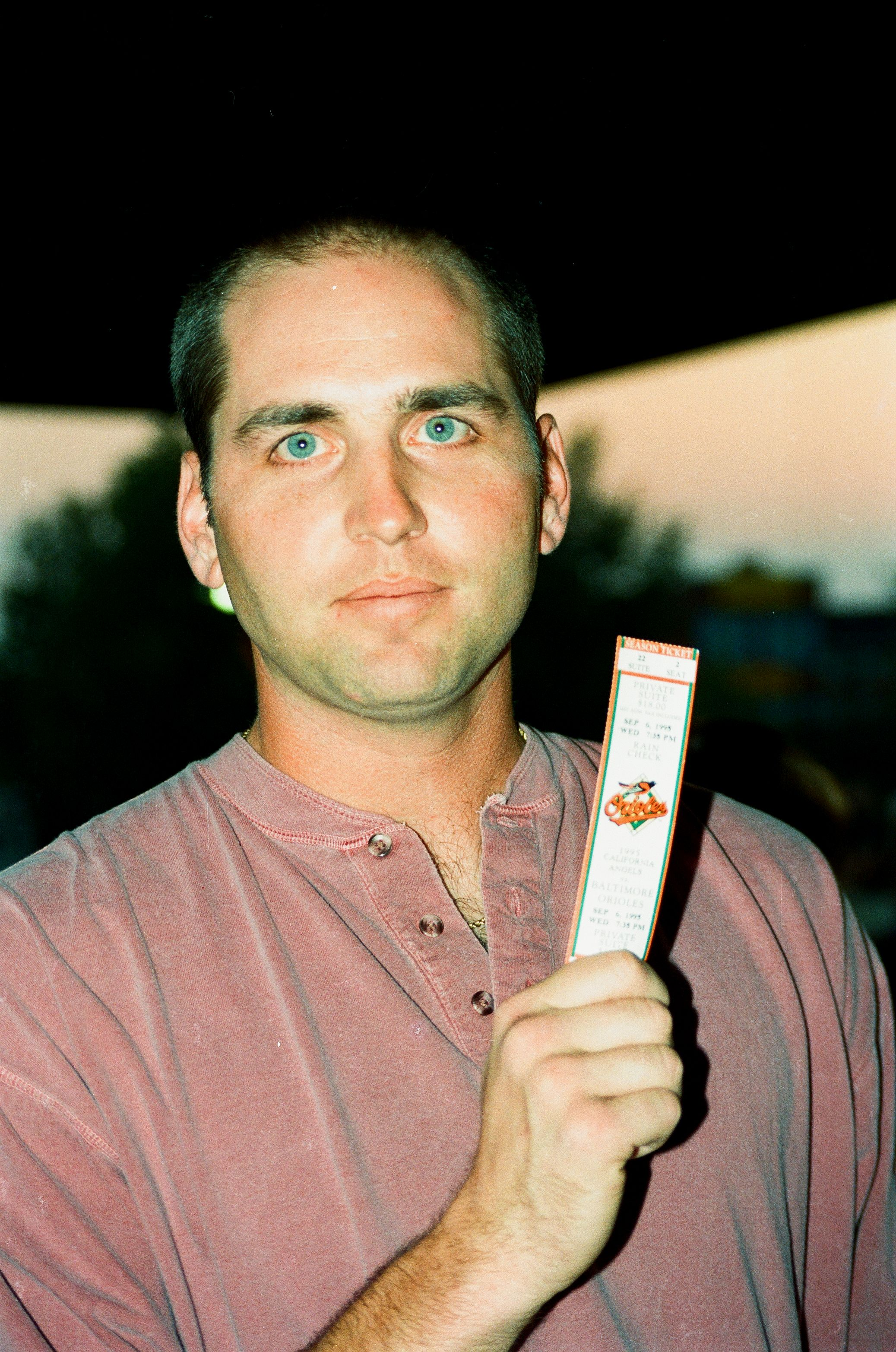
Billy Ripken holding a ticket to see his brother Cal break a record

Ripken signed with the Cleveland Indians for 1995 but spent nearly the entire season with the Triple-A Buffalo Bisons of the American Association. At Buffalo, Ripken made the American Association All-Star team and ranked among league leaders in games (130; fifth), hits (131; eighth), and doubles (34; third, behind John Marzano's 41 and Tracy Woodson's 35). He was called up in September and batted .412 in eight games for the Indians before becoming a free agent after the season.

=== Return to Baltimore Orioles (1996) ===
In 1996, Ripken was reunited with his brother when the Orioles signed him once again. Initially signed to a minor league contract, he made the team and spent the full season on the Orioles' roster, filling in at third base for the injured B. J. Surhoff from May 21 through June 6. He appeared in 57 games for the Orioles, batting .230 with 31 hits, two home runs, and 12 RBI. Defensively, he did not make a single error at third base. The Orioles reached the playoffs that year, but Ripken was left off the playoff roster. After the season, he became a free agent.

=== Return to Texas Rangers (1997) ===
Ripken again returned to a team in 1997 when he signed with the Rangers. Initially used as a utility man, he took over at shortstop from Benji Gil on June 12 after batting .314 to start the season. That same day, he had the first RBI in interleague history, a single against Mark Gardner in a 4–3 loss to the San Francisco Giants. He suffered a herniated disk in his back on June 17 and although he would return to play several more games that season for the Rangers, he failed to remain the starting shortstop. In 71 games, he batted .276 with 56 hits, three home runs, and 24 RBI. After the season, he again became a free agent.

=== Detroit Tigers (1998) ===
The Detroit Tigers signed Ripken in December 1997 and gave him the starting shortstop job to begin the 1998 season due to a broken ankle suffered by Deivi Cruz in the offseason. After 27 games, however, in which he hit .276, Ripken was placed on the disabled list with a knee injury. He went on a rehab assignment in June, but the Tigers opted to release him instead of reinstating him from the disabled list. This was Ripken's last major league tenure; he chose to retire.

=== Legacy ===
While Cal Jr. set a major league record by playing in 2,632 consecutive games, Billy often found himself on the disabled list in his career. This, however, was due to his all-out style of play. Jimmy Keenan of the Society for American Baseball Research wrote, "Infielder Billy Ripken attacked the game of baseball with reckless abandon and paid the price, sustaining an inordinate number of injuries during his career. He never changed his all-out, hustling style of play, earning the reputation of a player who left it all on the field."

Billy and Cal Ripken are one of only four brother combinations in major league history to play second base and shortstop on the same club. The others are Garvin and Granny Hamner, for the Philadelphia Phillies in 1945; the twins Eddie and Johnny O'Brien, with the Pittsburgh Pirates in the mid-1950s, and Frank and Milt Bolling, for the Detroit Tigers in 1958. Billy also holds some records of his own. In addition to having the first RBI in interleague history, he has the 27th-best all-time fielding percentage of major league second basemen, at .987.

== Personal life and post-MLB career ==
On February 13, 1989, Ripken married Candace Cauffman. They live in Fallston, Maryland, and have two daughters, named Miranda and Anna, and two sons, named Reese and Jack. Ripken is currently a studio analyst for MLB Network and a radio personality for SiriusXM. After retiring from baseball, he partnered with Cal to form Ripken Baseball, which owns three minor league teams, the Aberdeen IronBirds, Augusta Greenjackets, and Charlotte Stone Crabs. Ripken Baseball and MLB.com, the official website of Major League Baseball, launched GetGreat.com on March 6, 2009. GetGreat.com is a youth baseball instructional site.

Billy has taken part in the writing of several books relating to the development of young baseball players. In 2005, he and Cal wrote Play Baseball the Ripken Way: The Complete Illustrated Guide to the Fundamentals, co-authored by Larry Burke. Working with Rick Wolff, the brothers released the book Parenting Young Athletes the Ripken Way in 2006 in response to Cal seeing too many young athletes who he felt were being pressured unnecessarily by their parents. He said, "I was thinking, `This just creates too much pressure on kids.' They need to find an environment in which they can explore their game ... without all these kinds of pressures being brought to bear. Once I started thinking about it, I saw we had more than enough to fill a book." They also wrote Coaching Youth Baseball the Ripken Way, co-written with Scott Lowe and published in 2007.

Along with his brother, Billy formed the Cal Ripken Sr. Foundation in 2001 to give underprivileged children the opportunity to attend baseball camps around the country and learn the game. The Foundation is a branch of Ripken Baseball. In addition to controlling these camps and Ripken's minor league teams, Ripken Baseball operates for-profit camps and designs ballfields for youth, college, and professional teams.

Ripken's mother, Violet Ripken, was kidnapped at gunpoint and safely returned on July 24, 2012. She was gone for 12 hours before her disappearance was reported to authorities. On October 15, 2013, she was approached by a man with a handgun in a parking lot at the NBRS Bank in Aberdeen, Maryland. The man demanded her car, but she activated a key alarm and he fled. She was unharmed. Lt. Frederick Bundick, spokesman for the Aberdeen Police, said the two incidents appeared unrelated.

During the 2009 World Baseball Classic, Ripken served as a first base coach for the United States national team. The United States advanced to the semifinals in the tournament. As of 2016, Ripken is the national spokesman for Blue Coast Savings, a management consulting group.

== See also ==
- List of second-generation Major League Baseball players

== Notes ==
- Rosenfeld, Harvey (1995). Iron Man: The Cal Ripken Jr. Story. New York: St. Martin's Press. ISBN 0-312-13524-6.
