= Mike Smith (pitcher, born 1963) =

American baseball player

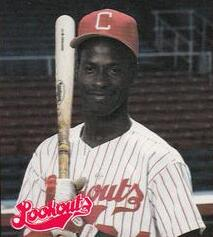
- Smith with the Chattanooga Lookouts c. 1988
- Pitcher
- Born: October 31, 1963 (age 62); San Antonio, Texas, U.S.
- Batted: Right Threw: Right

MLB debut
- June 30, 1989, for the Baltimore Orioles

Last MLB appearance
- September 30, 1990, for the Baltimore Orioles

MLB statistics
- Games pitched: 15
- Win–loss record: 2–0
- Earned run average: 8.22
- Strikeouts: 14
- Stats at Baseball Reference

Teams
- Baltimore Orioles (1989–1990)

Michael Anthony Smith (born October 31, 1963) is an American former professional baseball player who was a pitcher in Major League Baseball with the Baltimore Orioles from 1989 to 1990.

During Smith's rookie season in Major League Baseball, he was one of two pitchers on the Baltimore Orioles named Michael Anthony Smith. Smith and the other pitcher were identified in the locker room by their state of birth, the former being born in Texas and other being born in Mississippi. Smith currently pitches for the Boston Wolfpack in the Men's Senior Baseball League, an amateur baseball organization.
