= Joe Orsulak =

American baseball player (born 1962)

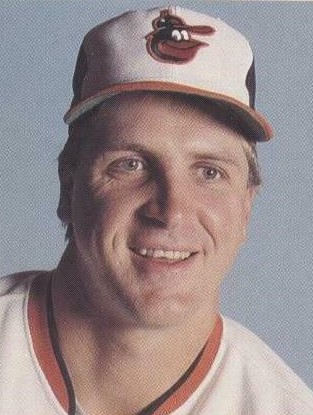
- Outfielder
- Born: May 31, 1962 (age 63); Glen Ridge, New Jersey, U.S.
- Batted: Left Threw: Left

MLB debut
- September 1, 1983, for the Pittsburgh Pirates

Last MLB appearance
- October 3, 1997, for the Montreal Expos

MLB statistics
- Batting average: .273
- Home runs: 57
- Runs batted in: 405
- Stats at Baseball Reference

Teams
- Pittsburgh Pirates (1983–1986); Baltimore Orioles (1988–1992); New York Mets (1993–1995); Florida Marlins (1996); Montreal Expos (1997)

Career highlights and awards
- Baltimore Orioles Hall of Fame

Joseph Michael Orsulak (born May 31, 1962) is an American former Major League Baseball player whose career spanned 1983 to 1997 with the Pittsburgh Pirates, Baltimore Orioles, New York Mets, Florida Marlins, and Montreal Expos. Orsulak, who threw and batted left-handed, played mostly in the outfield, although he played some games at first base late in his career. On the basepaths, he had excellent speed until a 1987 knee injury slowed him down. He was traded from the Pirates to the Orioles for Rico Rossy and minor-league shortstop Terry Crowley, Jr. on November 6, 1987. He led the league in outfield assists in 1991. In 1992, he made the first out at the Orioles' new Camden Yards ballpark, going on to lead the team that year in batting average. He elected to become a free agent on October 28, 1992, after five seasons with the Orioles. Despite his relatively long career (with five major league clubs), he never played in the post-season in the Majors.

Orsulak played winter ball for three consecutive years with Navegantes del Magallanes in the LVBP (Venezuelan Winter League), starting with the 1983 season, during which he met his future wife, Adriana Venditti. They married during the 1988 All-Star break and had two children, Joseph and Michael. After a long struggle with brain cancer, Adriana died in 2004.

Orsulak grew up in Parsippany–Troy Hills, New Jersey, where he graduated from Parsippany Hills High School. He turned down a full scholarship to Seton Hall University in order to sign with the Pirates.
