= Cal Ripken Sr. =

American baseball coach and manager (1935–1999)

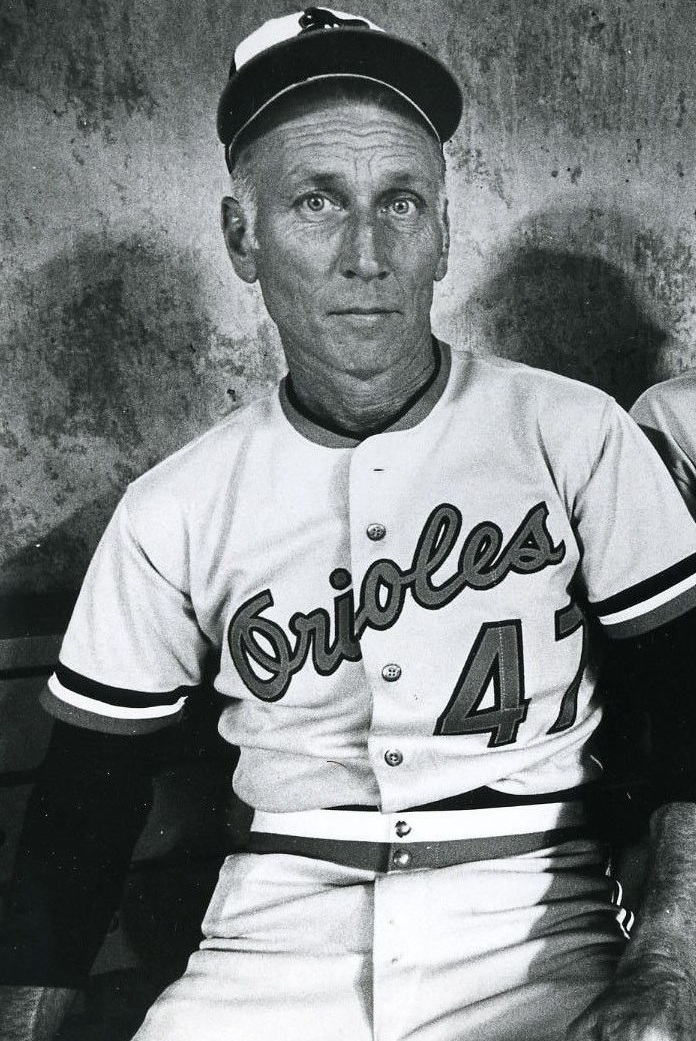
- Ripken with the Baltimore Orioles in 1982
- Manager / Coach
- Born: December 17, 1935; Aberdeen, Maryland, U.S.
- Died: March 25, 1999 (aged 63); Aberdeen, Maryland, U.S.
- Batted: Right Threw: Right

MLB Managing debut
- June 13, 1985, for the Baltimore Orioles

Last MLB Managing appearance
- April 11, 1988, for the Baltimore Orioles

MLB statistics
- Games managed: 169
- Managerial record: 68–101
- Winning %: .402
- Stats at Baseball Reference
- Managerial record at Baseball Reference

Teams
- As manager: Baltimore Orioles (1985, 1987–1988); As coach: Baltimore Orioles (1976–1986, 1989–1992)

Career highlights and awards
- World Series champion (1983); Baltimore Orioles Hall of Fame

Calvin Edwin Ripken (December 17, 1935 – March 25, 1999) was an American professional baseball player, scout, coach and manager who spent 36 years in the Baltimore Orioles organization. He played in the Orioles' farm system beginning in 1957, and later served as coach and manager of the parent club, on which his sons Cal Jr. and Billy played.

Born near Aberdeen, Maryland, which he called home throughout his life, Ripken joined the Baltimore Orioles in 1957 as a minor league player. He spent the next 36 years in the organization, mainly as a coach, with only one season and seven games coming as a manager. As a manager in the minor leagues for 13 years, Ripken won 964 games, and later compiled a 68–101 record managing the Orioles. Several of his students, including Jim Palmer, Eddie Murray, and most prominently his son Cal Jr., went on to Hall of Fame careers. He was credited for helping sculpt his team's tradition of excellence known as "The Oriole Way".

== Early life ==
Ripken was born December 17, 1935, near Aberdeen, Maryland, in a general store his parents, Clara Amelia (Oliver) and Arend Fredrick Ripken, owned 3 miles (4.8 km) south of Aberdeen. He became involved in baseball as early as 1946, when he served as the batboy for a semipro team his older brother Oliver played for.

He attended Aberdeen High School, where he helped the baseball team win three county championships and go undefeated in 1952. As a player, he was a catcher. In the late 1950s, he also played and coached soccer, once helping his team win 17 straight games. However, as former teammate J. Robert Hooper recalled, "We couldn't win the championship because Rip was in spring training."

== Minor league playing career ==
The Baltimore Orioles signed Ripken in 1957. The scout who signed him to his first minor league contract, which was for $150 a month, did not have a pen and had to borrow one from a spectator. He began his 36-year tenure in the organization as the starting catcher for the Phoenix Stars of the Class C Arizona–Mexico League. Ripken recalled, "At Phoenix, my manager was Bob Hooper, who also pitched. He was a great teacher and threw the best stiff-wrist slider I ever saw. Bob used so much resin that after a game when I'd congratulate him, our hands would stick together." Next year, he was promoted to the Wilson Tobs of the Class B Carolina League, where he played 118 games. In 1959, he split the season between the Pensacola Dons of the Class D Alabama–Florida League and the Amarillo Gold Sox of the Texas League. Most of his playing time came in 61 games with Pensacola; he only appeared in 30 games for Amarillo.

Ripken spent 1960 with the Fox Cities Foxes of the Class B Illinois–Indiana–Iowa League, known as the Three-I League. He had his best season that year, batting a career-high .281 with 100 hits, nine home runs, and 74 RBI. Earl Weaver, eventually a Hall of Fame manager for the Orioles but manager of Fox Cities in 1960, recalled, "He was hitting over .300 until our team bus driver quit and Cal started doing his job, too. The 15-hour bus trips were strenuous work, but Rip always was hard as nails – toughness personified." During spring training in 1961, he suffered an injury after several foul tips went off his shoulder. Initial X-rays showed nothing, but three months into the season it was discovered that Ripken had a dislocated shoulder, an atrophied deltoid muscle, and a tendon problem. He continued to play, but the injury took years to fully recover from, and his son, Cal Jr., wrote, "Practically speaking, if my father wanted to stay in the game he'd have to shift his sights from playing to coaching and managing." He played with three teams in 1961: the Class D Leesburg Orioles of the Florida State League, the Double-A Little Rock Travelers of the Southern Association, and the Triple-A Rochester Red Wings of the International League. The stint with Rochester came because the Red Wings were in desperate need of a catcher; although Ripken could catch and handle pitchers, the injury had robbed him of the ability to throw well. He appeared in 58 games with the Class D Appleton Foxes in 1962, and played his final games in 1964, when he made two appearances for the Class A Aberdeen Pheasants of the Northern League.

== Minor league managerial career ==
As Ripken's playing career wound down, his coaching career began. His first experience as manager came in 1961, when he succeeded Billy DeMars (who had been promoted) as Leesburg's manager in June. Leesburg folded after the 1961 season. In 1963, at the age of 27, he became a full-time manager with Fox Cities. From 1963 through 1974, he managed Fox Cities, Abderdeen (1963–64, 66), the Tri-City Atoms (1965), the Miami Marlins (1967), the Elmira Pioneers (1968), the Rochester Red Wings (1969–70), the Dallas-Fort Worth Spurs (1971), and the Asheville Orioles (1972–74).

As a manager in the minor leagues, Ripken oversaw the development of Jim Palmer, Eddie Murray, and Rich Dauer, among other Orioles. In addition to normal coaching duties, he was also at times responsible for driving the team bus, or even fixing it. During 1969–70, managing a Triple-A team, he conducted baseball clinics for the Red Wings players. Cal Jr. always listened to these; he found them "boring" but did learn some useful baseball skills in them. Although Ripken always considered Aberdeen, Maryland, his home during this period, he and his family lived all over the country as he moved from city to city. In 1975, Ripken served as a scout for the Orioles.

== Coaching ==
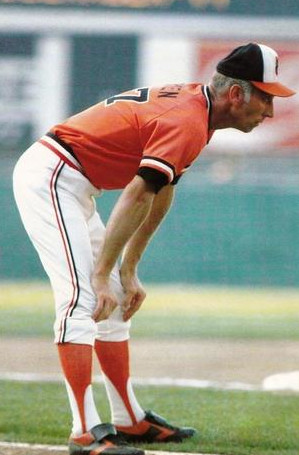
Ripken Sr. in 1977

In 1976, Ripken finally reached the major leagues when the Orioles named him their bullpen coach. Halfway through 1977, he became the third base coach for the Orioles when Billy Hunter was hired to be the manager of the Texas Rangers. Ripken served in this role through the 1986 season. During this time, and even later when he became a manager, he pitched batting practice and hit fungoes before games. He was one of the last members of the team to leave after games. Ripken could be tough on the players he coached, enjoying using the term "lunkhead" when talking to them, but he always made time to answer any questions they had about the game.

Doug DeCinces, who played under him through the 1981 season, recalled, "He was the dictator of that regimen, instructing us on everything down to how to wear our socks. He said, `Take pride in your appearance and you'll take pride in your game.'" The Orioles experienced great success during this time, reaching the World Series in 1979, which they lost to the Pittsburgh Pirates in seven games. Four years later, Ripken earned a World Series ring as the Orioles won the 1983 World Series in five games over the Philadelphia Phillies.

In 1981, Ripken got to coach his own son as Cal Jr. reached the major leagues. He always downplayed the father-son relationship, saying in 1981 spring training, "There isn't any father-son relationship here. I managed 14 years in the minors, including 1967 right in Miami, and saw hundreds of kids. They're all my sons, more or less. On this field or on this club, my son is just another ballplayer to me. I have a job and a life and so does he."

== Managing ==
=== Overview ===
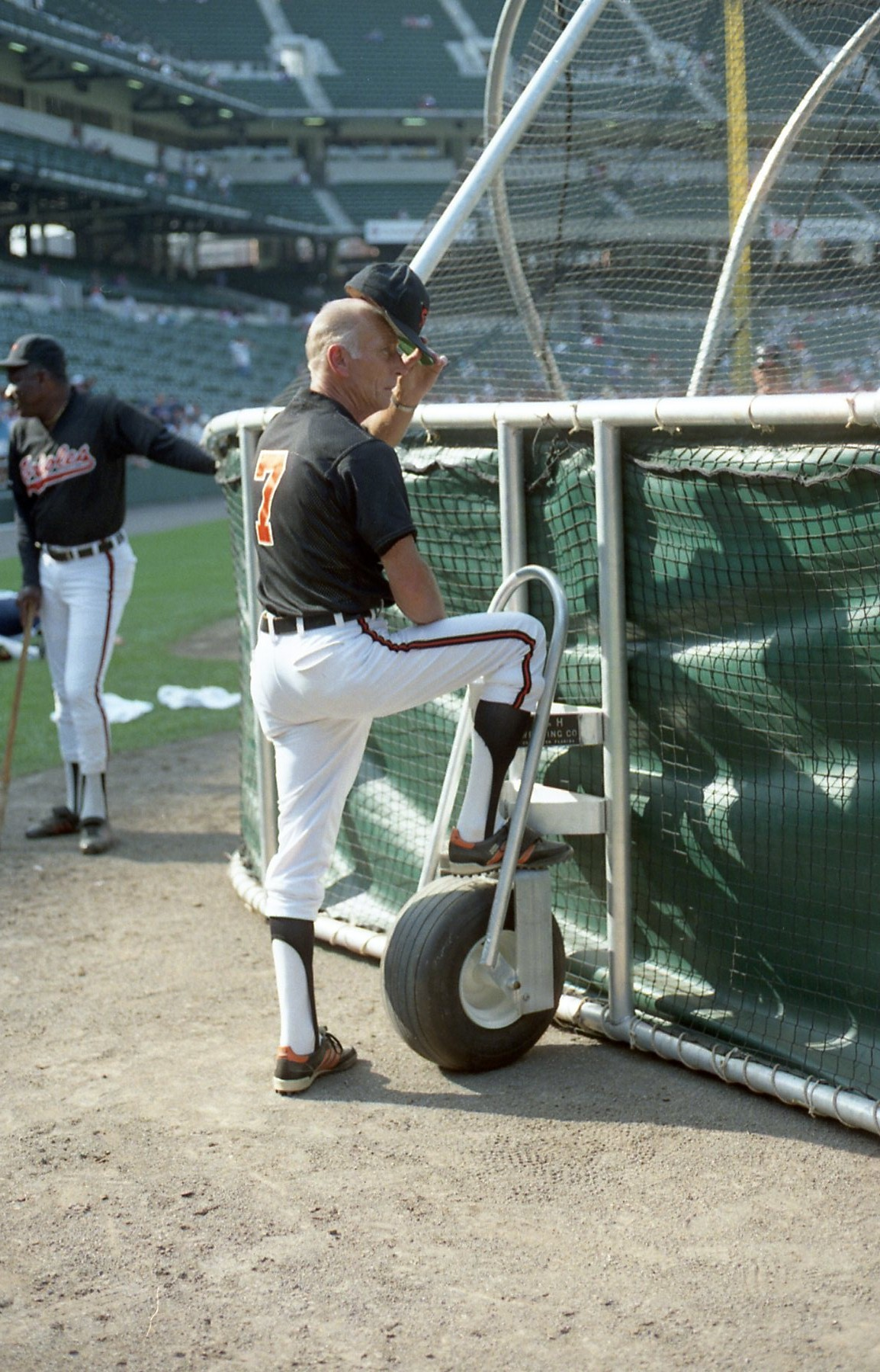
Cal Ripken Sr. coaching for the Baltimore Orioles during pre-game batting practice at Oriole Park

After 1982, Weaver retired, and Ripken hoped to be a candidate for the managerial position. The Orioles announced they wanted someone with many years of experience for the job, but they went with Joe Altobelli instead. After Altobelli was fired in 1985, Ripken finally got his chance to manage, but it was only for one game in the absence of Weaver, who came out of retirement. On June 14, 1985, Ripken managed his son for the first time. The Orioles defeated the Milwaukee Brewers 8–3 that day, and Melody Simmons of the Baltimore Evening Sun wrote that Ripken had "a Christmas-morning look on his face ... the evening's purist, a Cinderella in spikes." Ripken showed no disappointment over getting passed over each of those times, although he "thought he was the choice" in 1985.

Immediately following the 1986 season, Weaver retired for good, and Ripken was named manager of the Orioles. The Orioles were coming off their first last-place finish in Baltimore, but Ripken expressed confidence in the team at the beginning of the 1987 season, saying, "I know these guys can get the job done. I may be hardheaded, but that's what I believe. We'll be a competitive team." The Orioles got off to a slow start in April 1987, going 9–12 while losing seven of nine games in one stretch. However, the ballclub improved in May, moving over .500 while setting a May record with 56 home runs. In June, the team fell out of contention, dropping to 28–36, their worst start since 1955. Pitching plagued the club; Harvey Rosenfeld wrote it was "the root cause of the Orioles' problems." In 1987, Ripken became the first—and still only—father to manage two sons simultaneously in the majors, as his son Billy was called up at the All-Star break. Ripken managed Cal Jr. and Billy for the first time on July 11, in a 2–1 loss to the Minnesota Twins. The Havre de Grace Record wrote, "The Ripkens of Aberdeen became the first family of sports." On September 14, during a 17–3 loss to the Toronto Blue Jays, Ripken substituted Cal Jr. with Ron Washington after the eighth inning, ending Cal Jr.'s major-league record streak of 8,243 consecutive innings played. Senior said after the game, "I've been thinking about it for a long time. I wanted to take the monkey off his back. It was my decision, not his." The Orioles finished sixth in the American League East at 67–95, setting a team record with 51 home losses.

Ripken stressed "patience" to begin the 1988 season, saying, "We can't just go from the bottom to the top in the snap of a finger ... Have patience and stick with the Birds and root for the Birds." After the Orioles lost six consecutive games to begin the 1988 season, Ripken was fired. Several years later, he said, "It was very difficult to accept. I had been in the organization. I had worked my way up to the big leagues. I spent my life with the Orioles." The move "hurt" and "bothered" Cal Jr., but he worked through it and remained with the team for 13 more seasons, the rest of his career. Billy switched his number from 3 to 7, saying, "I just didn't want to see anybody else wear it." After Hall of Famer Frank Robinson replaced Ripken, the Orioles proceeded to lose 15 more consecutive games to set the record for the longest losing streak to start a season. Ripken finished his managerial record with a record of 68 wins and 101 losses.

=== Managerial record ===
Managerial history of Cal Ripken Sr.
Team	Year	Regular season					Postseason			
Team	Year	Games	Won	Lost	Win %	Finish	Won	Lost	Win %	Result
BAL	1985	1	1	0	1.000	interim	–	–	–	–
BAL	1987	162	67	95	.414	6th in AL East	–	–	–	–
BAL	1988	6	0	6	.000	fired	–	–	–	–
Total		169	68	101	.402		0	0	–	

== Final years ==
Following the 1988 season, the Orioles again named Ripken their third-base coach. Speaking at the Annual Ripken Fan Club Banquet, general manager Roland Hemond said, "[1988] was a tough year for the Orioles, a tough year for me, and a tough year for the Ripken family. There was a lot of trauma, and I respected them for the way they handled it. I will never forget it." Brady Anderson, who played for the Orioles from 1988 through 2001 and hit 50 home runs in 1996, credited Ripken for helping him make it with the Orioles: "I'll never forget earlier in my career how Cal Sr. stayed with me, trying to help me become a better player when it might not have been the fashionable thing to do within the organization." Ripken remained with the team until after the 1992 season, when he was removed from third-base coach duties as the Orioles wished to give younger coaches opportunities. The Orioles offered him the brand new position of coordinator of minor league field operations, but he declined, disappointed at being removed from third base. Ripken maintained that he was not retired, but he never coached professionally again.

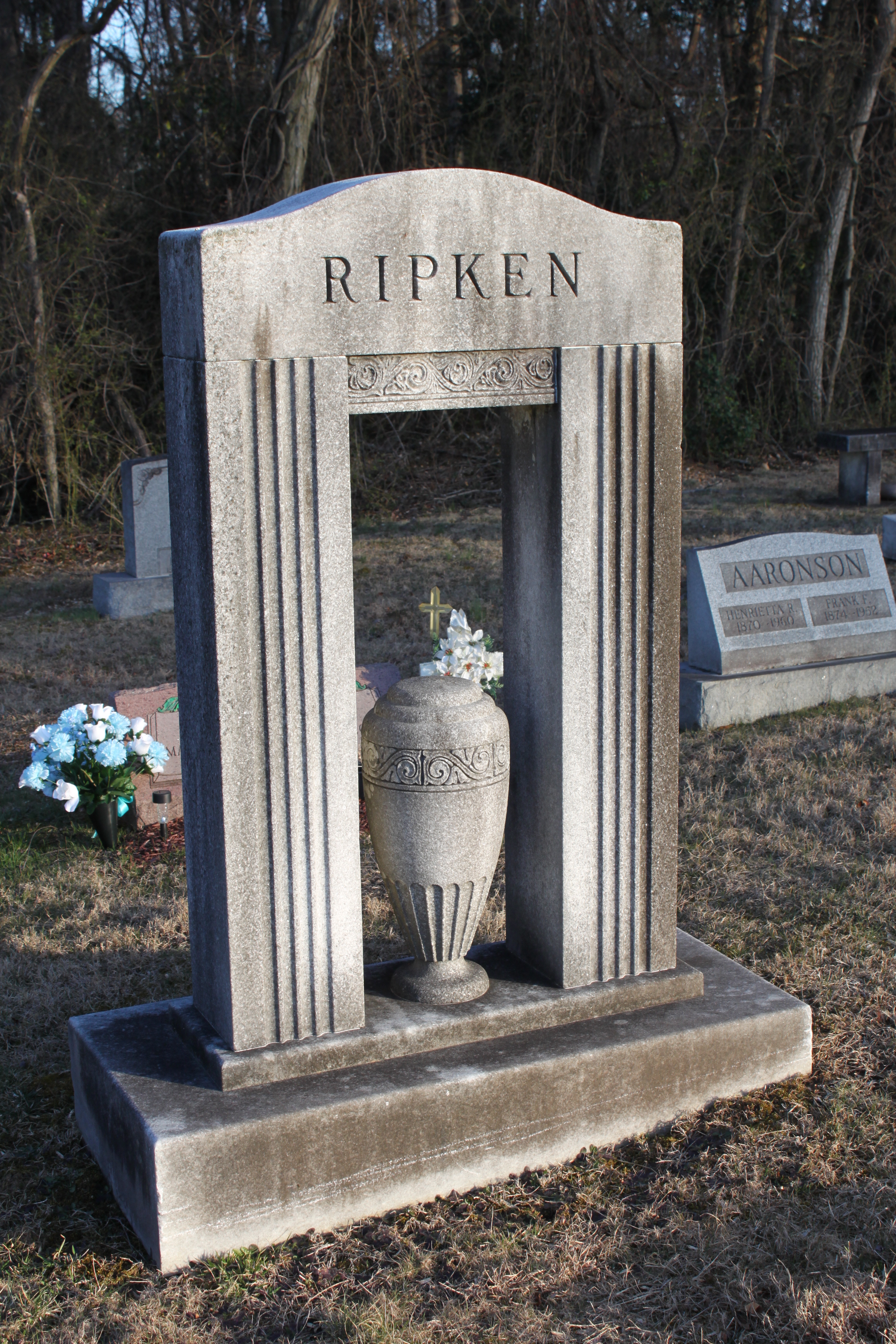
Grave of Ripken at Baker Cemetery

In 1996, Ripken was inducted into the Orioles Hall of Fame, along with Jerry Hoffberger and Billy Hunter, all three of whom were greatly admired by Orioles' fans. A heavy smoker who once refuted a claim that he sat in back of team buses to be alone by saying he did so to "smoke cigarettes", Ripken died on March 25, 1999, at the age of 63 from lung cancer, seventeen days after the death of Joe DiMaggio. He was buried five days later, at Baker Cemetery in Aberdeen. The Orioles wore a number 7 patch on their sleeves all through the 1999 season to commemorate Ripken's contributions to the team. A plaque hangs in the Orioles dugout at Oriole Park at Camden Yards to honor his long and distinguished career, and the Cal Ripken Collegiate Baseball League is named in his honor.

== Legacy ==
Altogether, Ripken spent 36 years in the Baltimore Orioles organization, serving as a player, a scout, a coach, and a manager. He is remembered for helping bring about "The Oriole Way", Baltimore's tradition of excellence. The Baltimore Sun wrote, "Most Baltimore fans couldn't define the term exactly, but they liked that it implied reverence for the sport and the skills needed to play it well." Elrod Hendricks, another longtime Oriole coach who kept in touch with Ripken throughout the years, said "He was baseball and baseball was him." Sam Perlozzo, who like Ripken spent many years as a third base coach, said "When you were around him, you didn't say much. One reason was out of respect. The other was because you could learn from him, no matter how long you had been in the game." Despite his 36 years with the organization, only a little more than one of them were as manager of the team, causing Thomas Boswell to write, "The idea that a person could find deep satisfaction through fulfilling difficult responsibilities – while never focusing on personal rewards – seems antique these days. Yet Ripken's example makes you wonder if the century, not Senior, has lost its way." After his death, no Oriole wore Cal Sr.'s number 7 until Jackson Holliday in 2024.

== Personal life ==
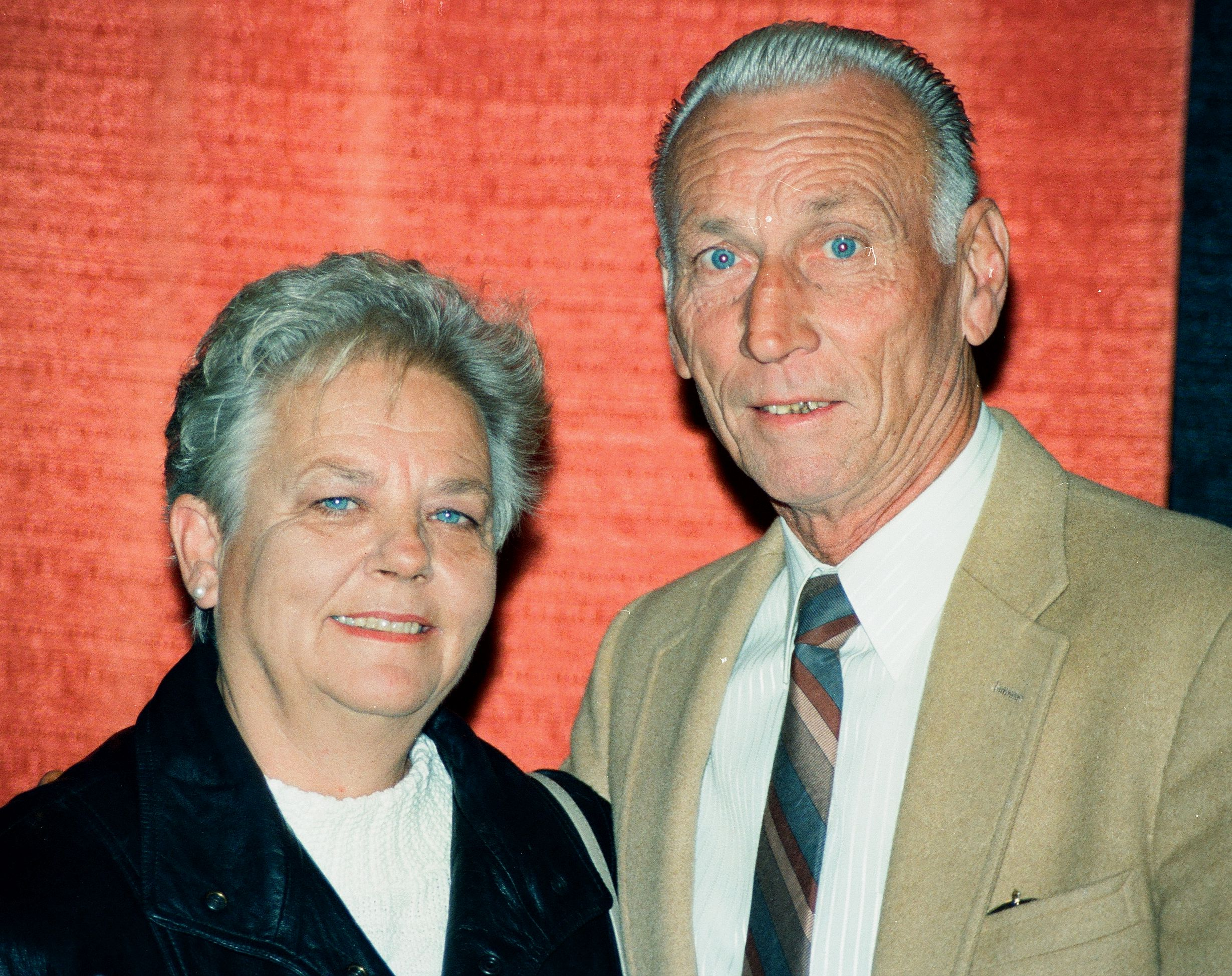
Vi and Cal Ripken Sr. in 1996

Ripken was married to Violet ("Vi"), whom he met in high school. They had three sons, Cal Jr., Fred, and Billy; and a daughter, Ellen. They lived in a split-level house on Clover Street in Aberdeen, Maryland. Two of his sons played in the major leagues. Cal Jr. most notably broke Lou Gehrig's record for consecutive games played and had over 3,000 hits in his Hall of Fame career. Billy, while not quite as successful as his brother, played 12 years in the major leagues. Cal Sr. also had two older brothers, Oliver and Bill.

Violet Ripken was kidnapped at gunpoint and safely returned on July 24, 2012. On October 15, 2013, a man with a handgun attempted to steal her car, but she scared him away. Lieutenant Frederick Bundick, spokesman for the Aberdeen Police, said the two incidents appeared unrelated. Cal Jr. offered a $100,000 reward for information leading to the kidnapper on August 1, 2013.

Preceded by Jim Frey	Baltimore Orioles Bullpen Coach; 1976–1977	Succeeded by Elrod Hendricks
Preceded by Billy Hunter	Baltimore Orioles Third Base Coach; 1977–1986	Succeeded by John Hart
Preceded by John Hart	Baltimore Orioles Third Base Coach; 1989–1992	Succeeded by Mike Ferraro
