= Craig Worthington =

American baseball player (born 1965)

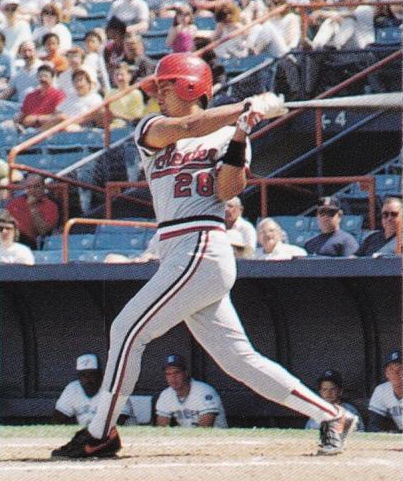
- Worthington with the Rochester Red Wings c. 1988
- Third baseman
- Born: April 17, 1965 (age 61); Los Angeles, California, U.S.
- Batted: Right Threw: Right

Professional debut
- MLB: April 26, 1988, for the Baltimore Orioles
- NPB: June 30, 1996, for the Hanshin Tigers
- CPBL: April 25, 1997, for the Koos Group Whales

Last appearance
- MLB: May 14, 1996, for the Texas Rangers
- NPB: October 9, 1996, for the Hanshin Tigers
- CPBL: May 8, 1997, for the Koos Group Whales

MLB statistics
- Batting average: .230
- Home runs: 33
- Runs batted in: 144

NPB statistics
- Batting average: .267
- Home runs: 3
- Runs batted in: 12

CPBL statistics
- Batting average: .100
- Home runs: 0
- Runs batted in: 0
- Stats at Baseball Reference

Teams
- Baltimore Orioles (1988–1991); Cleveland Indians (1992); Cincinnati Reds (1995); Texas Rangers (1995–1996); Hanshin Tigers (1996); Koos Group Whales (1997)

Craig Richard Worthington (born April 17, 1965) is an American former professional baseball third baseman who played all or part of seven seasons in Major League Baseball (MLB), between 1988 and 1996. He was drafted by the Baltimore Orioles, and later played for the Cleveland Indians, Cincinnati Reds, and Texas Rangers. He also played the end of the 1996 season for the Hanshin Tigers, and part of the 1997 season for the Koos Group Whales.

== Career ==
Worthington is of Native Hawaiian and Mexican descent. Worthington attended Cantwell High School in Montebello, California. He was drafted by the Baltimore Orioles in the 1st round (11th pick) of the 1985 amateur draft's secondary phase. The third baseman showed much promise, posting 15 home runs and 70 RBIs in 1989 with the Orioles.

Preceded by Chris Sabo	Topps Rookie All-Star Third Baseman; 1989	Succeeded by Robin Ventura
