= Rene Gonzales =

American baseball player (born 1960)

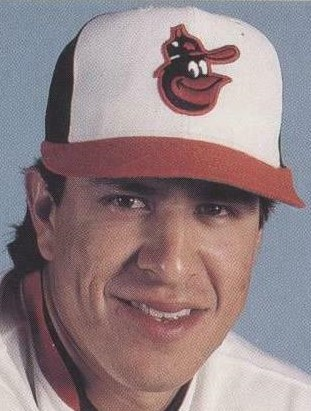
- Infielder
- Born: September 3, 1960 (age 66); Austin, Texas, U.S.
- Batted: Right Threw: Right

MLB debut
- July 27, 1984, for the Montreal Expos

Last MLB appearance
- September 28, 1997, for the Colorado Rockies

MLB statistics
- Batting average: .239
- Home runs: 19
- Runs batted in: 136
- Stats at Baseball Reference

Teams
- Montreal Expos (1984, 1986); Baltimore Orioles (1987–1990); Toronto Blue Jays (1991); California Angels (1992–1993); Cleveland Indians (1994); California Angels (1995); Texas Rangers (1996); Colorado Rockies (1997)

Rene Adrian Gonzales (born September 3, 1960) is an American former professional baseball infielder. He played in Major League Baseball (MLB) for the Montreal Expos, Baltimore Orioles, Toronto Blue Jays, California Angels, Cleveland Indians, Texas Rangers, and Colorado Rockies. He was nicknamed "Wonder Bread" for carrying his baseball glove in bags that originally contained the brand's product.
