= 1991 Minnesota Twins season =

Major League Baseball season

1991 Minnesota Twins
- World Series champions American League champions American League West champions
- League: American League
- Division: West
- Ballpark: Hubert H. Humphrey Metrodome
- City: Minneapolis
- Record: 95–67 (.586)
- Divisional place: 1st
- Owners: Carl Pohlad
- General managers: Andy MacPhail
- Managers: Tom Kelly
- Television: WCCO-TV; KITN; Midwest Sports Channel (Jim Kaat, Ted Robinson, Dick Bremer)
- Radio: 830 WCCO AM (Herb Carneal, John Gordon)

The 1991 Minnesota Twins season was the 31st season for the Minnesota Twins franchise in the Twin Cities of Minnesota, their 10th season at Hubert H. Humphrey Metrodome and the 91st overall in the American League.

They won the World Series, the second time the Twins had won the World Series since moving to Minnesota in 1961. At the beginning of June in the 1991 regular season, the Twins had an MLB-leading 15-game win streak, which remains a club record. On June 17, 1991, the streak came to an end at the hands of the Baltimore Orioles (as seen in the movie A Few Good Men) but not before the Twins moved from fifth place to first, a lead they would not relinquish while finishing 95–67, first in the AL West. The Twins' winning streak of 1991 falls seven games short of the all-time American League record of 22 consecutive regular season wins set by the Cleveland Indians in 2017.

The Twins' division title was an unprecedented turnaround. In 1990, the team finished last in the division with a 74–88 record. They were the first team to go from a last-place finish to a World Series championship. They and the Atlanta Braves of the same season were the first teams to go from last place to a pennant. The Twins defeated the Braves in seven games in a Series which has been considered one of the best to have ever been played.

There was a considerable reshaping of the team in January and February, beginning when third baseman Gary Gaetti left as a free agent on January 25 and signed with the California Angels. Less than 12 hours after Gaetti's departure, the Twins signed free agent Mike Pagliarulo from the San Diego Padres as a new third baseman. Two more key free agent signings followed with designated hitter Chili Davis on January 30 and St. Paul native Jack Morris on February 5. The July 1989 blockbuster trade that sent 1988 AL Cy Young Award winner Frank Viola to the New York Mets in exchange for relief pitchers Rick Aguilera and David West and starter Kevin Tapani proved to be pivotal to the 1991 season. There were only seven players still on the roster from the 1987 World Championship team, none of them pitchers: Randy Bush, Greg Gagne, Dan Gladden, Kent Hrbek, Gene Larkin, Al Newman, and future Hall of Famer Kirby Puckett. Into this framework, young stars were blended successfully, including Scott Leius to platoon with Pagliarulo at third, Shane Mack in right field, Scott Erickson, a 20-game winner with a 12-game winning streak, and A.L. Rookie of the Year second baseman Chuck Knoblauch.

2,293,842 fans attended Twins games, the eighth highest total in the American League.

The Twins' World Series-winning 1991 season remains the last time a Minnesota-based "Big Four" sports team has either won or played in their respective league's championship game.

== Offseason ==
- December 2, 1990: Roy Smith was released by the Twins.
- January 14, 1991: Tom Edens was signed by the Twins as a free agent.
- January 25, 1991: Mike Pagliarulo was signed as a free agent by the Twins.
- January 29, 1991: Chili Davis was signed as a free agent by the Twins.
- February 5, 1991: Jack Morris was signed as a free agent by the Twins.

The club moved spring training operations from Orlando's Tinker Field, where the franchise had trained since 1936, to the Lee County Sports Complex in Ft. Myers.

== Regular season ==
For the second time in his career, Kirby Puckett had a six-hit game on May 23. This was an eleven-inning game; the previous time in 1987 was in nine innings.

The highest paid player on the team was Jack Morris at $3,700,000; followed by Kirby Puckett at $3,166,667.

=== Offense ===
Team Leaders
Statistic	Player	Quantity
HR	Chili Davis	29
RBI	Chili Davis	93
BA	Kirby Puckett	.319
Runs	Kirby Puckett	92

=== Pitching ===
Jack Morris, Kevin Tapani, and Scott Erickson were a solid, 1-2-3 punch in the team's rotation. The fourth and fifth spots were less certain, with Allan Anderson, David West, and Mark Guthrie starting over 10 games. Rick Aguilera was a solid closer, earning 42 saves.

Team Leaders
Statistic	Player	Quantity
ERA	Kevin Tapani	2.99
Wins	Scott Erickson	20*
Saves	Rick Aguilera	42
Strikeouts	Jack Morris	163

*League leader

=== Defense ===
The regular lineup included Kent Hrbek at first base, rookie Chuck Knoblauch at second, Greg Gagne at shortstop, Brian Harper at catcher, and Kirby Puckett, Shane Mack, and Dan Gladden in the outfield. Mike Pagliarulo and Scott Leius platooned at third. Junior Ortiz was the backup catcher, and Al Newman was a reliable utility infielder.

=== Season standings ===
AL West
Team	W	L	Pct.	GB	Home	Road
Minnesota Twins	95	67	.586	—	51‍–‍30	44‍–‍37
Chicago White Sox	87	75	.537	8	46‍–‍35	41‍–‍40
Texas Rangers	85	77	.525	10	46‍–‍35	39‍–‍42
Oakland Athletics	84	78	.519	11	47‍–‍34	37‍–‍44
Seattle Mariners	83	79	.512	12	45‍–‍36	38‍–‍43
Kansas City Royals	82	80	.506	13	40‍–‍41	42‍–‍39
California Angels	81	81	.500	14	40‍–‍41	41‍–‍40

=== Record vs. opponents ===
1991 American League record Sources:
Team	BAL	BOS	CAL	CWS	CLE	DET	KC	MIL	MIN	NYY	OAK	SEA	TEX	TOR
Baltimore	—	8–5	6–6	4–8	7–6	5–8	4–8	3–10	4–8	5–8	3–9	4–8	9–3	5–8
Boston	5–8	—	4–8	7–5	9–4	5–8	7–5	7–6	3–9	6–7	8–4	9–3	5–7	9–4
California	6–6	8–4	—	8–5	7–5	5–7	9–4	6–6	8–5	6–6	1–12	6–7	5–8	6–6
Chicago	8–4	5–7	5–8	—	6–6	4–8	7–6	7–5	8–5	8–4	7–6	7–6	8–5	7–5
Cleveland	6–7	4–9	5–7	6–6	—	7–6	4–8	5–8	2–10	6–7	5–7	2–10	4–8	1–12
Detroit	8–5	8–5	7–5	8–4	6–7	—	8–4	4–9	4–8	8–5	4–8	8–4	6–6	5–8
Kansas City	8–4	5–7	4–9	6–7	8–4	4–8	—	9–3	6–7	7–5	6–7	7–6	7–6	5–7
Milwaukee	10–3	6–7	6–6	5–7	8–5	9–4	3–9	—	6–6	6–7	8–4	3–9	7–5	6–7
Minnesota	8–4	9–3	5–8	5–8	10–2	8–4	7–6	6–6	—	10–2	8–5	9–4	6–7	4–8
New York	8–5	7–6	6–6	4–8	7–6	5–8	5–7	7–6	2–10	—	6–6	3–9	5–7	6–7
Oakland	9–3	4–8	12–1	6–7	7–5	8–4	7–6	4–8	5–8	6–6	—	6–7	4–9	6–6
Seattle	8–4	3–9	7–6	6–7	10–2	4–8	6–7	9–3	4–9	9–3	7–6	—	5–8	5–7
Texas	3–9	7–5	8–5	5–8	8–4	6–6	6–7	5–7	7–6	7–5	9–4	8–5	—	6–6
Toronto	8–5	4–9	6–6	5–7	12–1	8–5	7–5	7–6	8–4	7–6	6–6	7–5	6–6	—

=== Roster ===
1991 Minnesota Twins
**Roster**
**Pitchers**: 37 Paul Abbott; 49 Allan Anderson; 38 Rick Aguilera; 23 Willie Banks; 40 Steve Bedrosian; 17 Larry Casian; 59 Tom Edens; 19 Scott Erickson; 53 Mark Guthrie; 30 Terry Leach; 47 Jack Morris; 36 Kevin Tapani; 48 Gary Wayne; 39 David West; 51 Carl Willis; 58 Denny Neagle	**Catchers**: 12 Brian Harper; 0 Junior Ortiz; 15 Lenny Webster; **Infielders**: 14 Kent Hrbek; 7 Greg Gagne; 11 Chuck Knoblauch; 31 Scott Leius; 26 Al Newman; 13 Mike Pagliarulo; 18 Paul Sorrento	**Outfielders**: 1 Jarvis Brown; 25 Randy Bush; 22 Carmen Castillo; 44 Chili Davis; 32 Dan Gladden; 9 Gene Larkin; 24 Shane Mack; 5 Pedro Muñoz; 34 Kirby Puckett	**Manager**: 10 Tom Kelly; **Coaches**: 46 Terry Crowley (hitting); 35 Ron Gardenhire (third base); 6 Tony Oliva (bench); 43 Rick Stelmaszek (bullpen); 42 Dick Such (pitching); 45 Wayne Terwilliger (first base)

=== Game log ===
Legend
	Twins win
	Twins loss
	Postponement
**Bold**	Twins team member

1991 game log: 95–67 (Home: 51–30; Away: 44–37)
April: 9–11 (Home: 7–4; Away: 2–7)

#	Date	Opponent	Score	Win	Loss	Save	Attendance	Record	Streak
1	April 9	@ Athletics	2–7	Stewart (1–0)	**Morris** (0–1)		44,373	0–1	L1
2	April 10	@ Athletics	4–1	**Anderson** (1–0)	Welch (0–1)	**Aguilera** (1)	22,958	1–1	W1
3	April 11	@ Athletics	0–3	Slusarski (1–0)	**Erickson** (0–1)	Eckersley (1)	22,169	1–2	L1
4	April 12	Angels	6–0	**Tapani** (1–0)	J. Abbott (0–1)		45,866	2–2	W1
5	April 13	Angels	9–15	Bailes (1–0)	**Guthrie** (0–1)		32,782	2–3	L1
6	April 14	Angels	4–9	Finley (2–0)	**Morris** (0–2)		22,513	2–4	L2
7	April 15	@ Mariners	4–8	Johnson (1–1)	**Anderson** (1–1)		15,120	2–5	L3
8	April 16	@ Mariners	0–3	Holman (1–1)	**Erickson** (0–2)		8,837	2–6	L4
9	April 17	@ Mariners	3–4 (11)	Jackson (1–1)	**Aguilera** (0–1)		9,628	2–7	L5
10	April 19	@ Angels	0–2	Finley (3–0)	**Morris** (0–3)		22,583	2–8	L6
11	April 20	@ Angels	1–2	McCaskill (2–1)	**Anderson** (1–2)	Harvey (3)	34,767	2–9	L7
12	April 21	@ Angels	4–3	**Erickson** (1–2)	Eichhorn (0–1)	**Aguilera** (2)	41,337	3–9	W1
13	April 22	Athletics	3–2	**Bedrosian** (1–0)	Klink (0–1)	**Aguilera** (3)	12,998	4–9	W2
14	April 23	Athletics	5–7	Dressendorfer (2–1)	**Guthrie** (0–2)	Eckersley (5)	12,574	4–10	L1
15	April 24	Athletics	7–4	**Morris** (1–3)	Stewart (1–2)	**Aguilera** (4)	18,950	5–10	W1
16	April 25	Mariners	4–3 (10)	**Bedrosian** (2–0)	Jackson (1–2)		10,230	6–10	W2
17	April 26	Mariners	6–0	**Erickson** (2–2)	Johnson (2–2)		15,965	7–10	W3
18	April 27	Mariners	7–2	**Tapani** (2–0)	Holman (2–2)		16,247	8–10	W4
19	April 28	Mariners	8–2	**Morris** (2–3)	Bankhead (1–2)		18,039	9–10	W5
20	April 30	Red Sox	5–7	Gray (1–1)	**Bedrosian** (2–1)	Reardon (8)	15,343	9–11	L1

May: 14–14 (Home: 6–8; Away: 8–6)

#	Date	Opponent	Score	Win	Loss	Save	Attendance	Record	Streak
21	May 1	Red Sox	1–0	**Erickson** (3–2)	Gray (1–2)		14,449	10–11	W1
22	May 2	@ Brewers	1–5	Brown (2–0)	**Tapani** (2–1)	Crim (3)	8,902	10–12	L1
23	May 3	@ Brewers	5–6	Navarro (2–0)	**Aguilera** (0–2)	Núñez (3)	13,033	10–13	L2
24	May 4	@ Brewers	7–4	**Guthrie** (1–2)	Bosio (3–3)	**Bedrosian** (1)	26,503	11–13	W1
25	May 5	@ Brewers	5–2 (10)	**Aguilera** (1–2)	Núñez (1–1)		11,183	12–13	W2
26	May 7	@ Red Sox	9–3	**Erickson** (4–2)	Harris (1–3)		23,815	13–13	W3
27	May 8	@ Red Sox	3–8	Clemens (6–0)	**Morris** (2–4)		25,134	13–14	L1
28	May 9	Tigers	0–3	Petry (1–1)	**Tapani** (2–2)	Gibson (3)	10,765	13–15	L2
29	May 10	Tigers	5–2	**Guthrie** (2–2)	Terrell (1–4)	**Aguilera** (5)	16,012	14–15	W1
30	May 11	Tigers	5–4	**Willis** (1–0)	Henneman (3–1)	**Aguilera** (6)	23,063	15–15	W2
31	May 12	Tigers	8–3	**Erickson** (5–2)	Gullickson (4–1)		13,189	16–15	W3
32	May 14	Brewers	5–1	**Morris** (3–4)	Navarro (2–2)		13,395	17–15	W4
33	May 15	Brewers	2–4	Bosio (4–4)	**Tapani** (2–3)	Plesac (1)	15,992	17–16	L1
34	May 16	Brewers	3–6	Wegman (1–1)	**Anderson** (1–3)	Holmes (1)	15,182	17–17	L2
35	May 17	@ Tigers	8–1	**Erickson** (6–2)	Gullickson (4–2)	**Bedrosian** (2)	13,673	18–17	W1
36	May 18	@ Tigers	4–1	**Guthrie** (3–2)	Tanana (2–3)	**Aguilera** (7)	31,432	19–17	W2
37	May 19	@ Tigers	3–8	Petry (2–2)	**Morris** (3–5)		17,148	19–18	L1
38	May 21	Rangers	5–6	Witt (2–3)	**Tapani** (2–4)	Jeff Russell (9)	12,427	19–19	L2
39	May 22	Rangers	2–5 (12)	Alexander (2–0)	**Willis** (1–1)	Jeff Russell (10)	13,283	19–20	L3
40	May 23	Rangers	6–10 (11)	Jeff Russell (1–0)	**Bedrosian** (2–2)		16,036	19–21	L4
41	May 24	Royals	3–2	**Morris** (4–5)	S. Davis (2–5)	**Aguilera** (8)	16,394	20–21	W1
42	May 25	Royals	2–11	Gubicza (1–2)	**Guthrie** (3–3)		19,943	20–22	L1
43	May 26	Royals	1–5	Saberhagen (5–3)	**Tapani** (2–5)		21,941	20–23	L2
44	May 27	@ Rangers	4–11	Brown (4–3)	**Anderson** (1–4)		31,302	20–24	L3
45	May 28	@ Rangers	3–0	**Erickson** (7–2)	Guzmán (0–1)	**Aguilera** (9)	26,518	21–24	W1
46	May 29	@ Rangers	9–1	**Morris** (5–5)	Ryan (3–4)		31,340	22–24	W2
47	May 30	@ Royals	4–2	**Guthrie** (4–3)	Gubicza (1–3)	**Aguilera** (10)	31,940	23–24	W3
48	May 31	@ Royals	1–4	Saberhagen (6–3)	**Tapani** (2–6)		26,321	23–25	L1

June: 22–6 (Home: 12–4; Away: 10–2)

#	Date	Opponent	Score	Win	Loss	Save	Attendance	Record	Streak
49	June 1	@ Royals	8–4	**Anderson** (2–4)	Appier (3–6)		29,985	24–25	W1
50	June 2	@ Royals	4–1	**Erickson** (8–2)	Gordon (4–3)	**Aguilera** (11)	25,394	25–25	W2
51	June 3	Orioles	3–2	**Morris** (6–5)	Robinson (3–5)	**Aguilera** (12)	12,497	26–25	W3
52	June 4	Orioles	4–3 (10)	**Willis** (2–1)	Olson (0–2)		11,672	27–25	W4
53	June 5	Orioles	4–3	**Tapani** (3–6)	Mesa (4–6)	**Aguilera** (13)	12,464	28–25	W5
54	June 7	Indians	2–0	**Anderson** (3–4)	Candiotti (7–3)	**Aguilera** (14)	18,200	29–25	W6
55	June 8	Indians	2–1	**Erickson** (9–2)	Nagy (2–6)	**Aguilera** (15)	25,313	30–25	W7
56	June 9	Indians	9–2	**Morris** (7–5)	Nichols (0–5)		20,677	31–25	W8
57	June 10	Indians	8–5	**Abbott** (1–0)	King (4–5)	**Aguilera** (16)	14,171	32–25	W9
58	June 11	Yankees	5–3	**Tapani** (4–6)	Habyan (4–2)	**Aguilera** (17)	18,233	33–25	W10
59	June 12	Yankees	6–3	**Anderson** (4–4)	Johnson (0–2)	**Bedrosian** (3)	19,178	34–25	W11
60	June 13	Yankees	10–3	**Erickson** (10–2)	Witt (0–1)		29,867	35–25	W12
61	June 14	@ Indians	7–0	**Morris** (8–5)	Shaw (0–1)		55,158	36–25	W13
62	June 15	@ Indians	11–7	**Abbott** (2–0)	Mutis (0–1)		20,997	37–25	W14
63	June 16	@ Indians	4–2 (10)	**Aguilera** (2–2)	Hillegas (2–1)		20,725	38–25	W15
64	June 17	@ Orioles	5–6	Williamson (1–2)	**Aguilera** (2–3)		25,600	38–26	L1
65	June 18	@ Orioles	9–2	**Erickson** (11–2)	Smith (3–1)	**Willis** (1)	26,401	39–26	W1
66	June 19	@ Orioles	8–4	**Morris** (9–5)	Olson (0–3)		44,742	40–26	W2
67	June 21	@ Yankees	5–4	**Guthrie** (5–3)	Sanderson (7–3)	**Aguilera** (18)	32,209	41–26	W3
68	June 22	@ Yankees	4–3	**Tapani** (5–6)	Taylor (2–2)	**Aguilera** (19)	25,352	42–26	W4
69	June 23	@ Yankees	2–11	Kamieniecki (2–0)	**Anderson** (4–5)		36,952	42–27	L1
70	June 24	@ Yankees	5–0	**Erickson** (12–2)	Johnson (1–3)		23,142	43–27	W1
71	June 25	Blue Jays	8–6	**Morris** (10–5)	Stottlemyre (8–3)	**Aguilera** (20)	26,350	44–27	W2
72	June 26	Blue Jays	2–5	Wells (9–4)	**Guthrie** (5–4)	Henke (13)	25,503	44–28	L1
73	June 27	Blue Jays	0–1	Guzmán (2–2)	**Tapani** (5–7)	Henke (14)	35,598	44–29	L2
74	June 28	White Sox	2–4	Hough (5–3)	**Anderson** (4–6)	Thigpen (15)	37,865	44–30	L3
75	June 29	White Sox	4–8	Hibbard (6–6)	**Erickson** (12–3)		50,525	44–31	L4
76	June 30	White Sox	3–0	**Morris** (11–5)	McDowell (9–4)		51,085	45–31	W1

July: 16–10 (Home: 7–3; Away: 9–7)

#	Date	Opponent	Score	Win	Loss	Save	Attendance	Record	Streak
77	July 1	White Sox	4–5 (10)	Thigpen (5–2)	**Willis** (2–2)		26,427	45–32	L1
78	July 2	@ Blue Jays	3–4	D. Ward (2–3)	**Leach** (0–1)		48,676	45–33	L2
79	July 3	@ Blue Jays	0–4	Candiotti (8–7)	**Anderson** (4–7)		50,071	45–34	L3
80	July 4	@ Blue Jays	1–0	**West** (1–0)	Key (10–4)	**Aguilera** (21)	50,293	46–34	W1
81	July 5	@ White Sox	2–4	McDowell (10–4)	**Morris** (11–6)	Thigpen (17)	41,657	46–35	L1
82	July 6	@ White Sox	5–4	**Willis** (3–2)	Radinsky (2–3)	**Aguilera** (22)	41,606	47–35	W1
83	July 7	@ White Sox	3–4	Patterson (3–0)	**Guthrie** (5–5)	Thigpen (18)	41,900	47–36	L1
ASG	July 9	NL @ AL	2–4	Key (1–0)	Martínez (0–1)	Eckersley (1)	52,383	—	N/A
84	July 11	Red Sox	7–3	**Willis** (4–2)	Harris (5–8)		31,409	48–36	W1
85	July 12	Red Sox	5–4	**Abbott** (3–0)	Clemens (11–6)	**Aguilera** (23)	37,262	49–36	W2
86	July 13	Red Sox	3–1	**Morris** (12–6)	Morton (1–1)	**Aguilera** (24)	42,803	50–36	W3
87	July 14	Red Sox	3–5	Hesketh (3–1)	**West** (1–1)	Reardon (22)	38,066	50–37	L1
88	July 15	@ Brewers	11–7	**Guthrie** (6–5)	Hunter (0–3)	**Bedrosian** (4)	16,201	51–37	W1
89	July 16	@ Brewers	3–4	Henry (1–0)	**Aguilera** (2–4)		15,954	51–38	L1
90	July 18	@ Red Sox	11–3	**Morris** (13–6)	Morton (1–2)		34,630	52–38	W1
91	July 19	@ Red Sox	3–2 (11)	**Bedrosian** (3–2)	Harris (6–9)	**Aguilera** (25)	33,758	53–38	W2
92	July 20	@ Red Sox	5–0	**Erickson** (13–3)	Gardiner (3–4)	**Guthrie** (1)	33,005	54–38	W3
93	July 21	@ Red Sox	14–1	**Tapani** (6–7)	Bolton (7–7)		32,849	55–38	W4
94	July 23	@ Tigers	3–6	Tanana (7–6)	**Anderson** (4–8)	Henneman (14)	21,976	55–39	L1
95	July 24	@ Tigers	3–6	Gullickson (13–5)	**West** (1–2)	Henneman (15)	18,391	55–40	L2
96	July 25	@ Tigers	9–3	**Erickson** (14–3)	Aldred (0–1)	**Bedrosian** (5)	20,087	56–40	W1
97	July 26	Brewers	6–3	**Tapani** (7–7)	Holmes (1–2)	**Aguilera** (26)	39,211	57–40	W2
98	July 27	Brewers	7–4	**Willis** (5–2)	Wegman (6–5)		47,632	58–40	W3
99	July 28	Brewers	2–11	Navarro (8–8)	**Morris** (13–7)		47,524	58–41	L1
100	July 29	Tigers	6–3	**West** (2–2)	Gullickson (13–6)	**Aguilera** (27)	35,599	59–41	W1
101	July 30	Tigers	9–7	**Willis** (6–2)	Cerutti (1–3)		42,035	60–41	W2
102	July 31	@ Yankees	12–3	**Tapani** (8–7)	Sanderson (10–7)		24,300	61–41	W3

August: 17–12 (Home: 8–5; Away: 9–7)

#	Date	Opponent	Score	Win	Loss	Save	Attendance	Record	Streak
103	August 1	@ Yankees	3–8	Cadaret (4–4)	**Abbott** (3–1)		25,711	61–42	L1
104	August 2	@ Athletics	1–3	Welch (9–6)	**Morris** (13–8)		44,160	61–43	L2
105	August 3	@ Athletics	8–6	**Bedrosian** (4–2)	Klink (8–3)	**Aguilera** (28)	43,119	62–43	W1
106	August 4	@ Athletics	6–2	**Erickson** (15–3)	Stewart (8–6)	**Willis** (2)	44,088	63–43	W2
107	August 5	@ Angels	7–4	**Tapani** (9–7)	Grahe (1–2)	**Aguilera** (29)	25,439	64–43	W3
108	August 6	@ Angels	7–4	**Banks** (1–0)	Finley (14–6)		27,872	65–43	W4
109	August 7	@ Angels	1–8	J. Abbott (10–8)	**Morris** (13–9)		30,726	65–44	L1
110	August 9	@ Mariners	5–2	**West** (3–2)	Johnson (10–8)	**Aguilera** (30)	31,112	66–44	W1
111	August 10	@ Mariners	0–8	Hanson (7–5)	**Erickson** (15–4)		29,548	66–45	L1
112	August 11	@ Mariners	5–2	**Tapani** (10–7)	Krueger (9–5)		31,007	67–45	W1
113	August 12	Angels	4–3	**Morris** (14–9)	Beasley (0–1)	**Aguilera** (31)	31,789	68–45	W2
114	August 13	Angels	3–8	J. Abbott (11–8)	**Banks** (1–1)	Harvey (26)	41,354	68–46	L1
115	August 14	Angels	4–7	McCaskill (9–15)	**West** (3–3)	Harvey (27)	26,242	68–47	L2
116	August 15	Angels	1–9	Langston (15–6)	**Erickson** (15–5)		31,880	68–48	L3
117	August 16	Athletics	5–4 (12)	**Aguilera** (3–4)	Nelson (1–4)		50,019	69–48	W1
118	August 17	Athletics	12–4	**Morris** (15–9)	Welch (10–8)		52,080	70–48	W2
119	August 18	Athletics	6–4	**Willis** (7–2)	Honeycutt (2–3)	**Aguilera** (32)	44,295	71–48	W3
120	August 19	Athletics	7–8	Klink (9–3)	**Bedrosian** (4–3)	Eckersley (34)	45,544	71–49	L1
121	August 20	Mariners	10–5	**Erickson** (16–5)	Hanson (7–6)	**Guthrie** (2)	32,090	72–49	W1
122	August 21	Mariners	9–1	**Tapani** (11–7)	Krueger (10–6)		30,631	73–49	W2
123	August 22	Mariners	5–4 (10)	**Aguilera** (4–4)	Schooler (0–1)		35,874	74–49	W3
124	August 23	@ Orioles	4–5	Olson (3–4)	**Willis** (7–3)		35,365	74–50	L1
125	August 24	@ Orioles	5–2	**Bedrosian** (5–3)	Flanagan (2–5)	**Aguilera** (33)	37,958	75–50	W1
126	August 25	@ Orioles	3–7	Mussina (2–3)	**Erickson** (16–6)	Frohwirth (2)	36,202	75–51	L1
127	August 26	@ Indians	5–3	**Tapani** (12–7)	Otto (1–4)	**Aguilera** (34)	5,003	76–51	W1
128	August 27	@ Indians	1–2	Swindell (8–12)	**Morris** (15–10)	Olin (8)	7,664	76–52	L1
129	August 28	@ Indians	4–2	**West** (4–3)	King (5–8)	**Aguilera** (35)	5,317	77–52	W1
130	August 30	Orioles	5–11	Milacki (8–7)	**Edens** (0–1)		30,214	77–53	L1
131	August 31	Orioles	5–2	**Tapani** (13–7)	Mussina (2–4)	**Aguilera** (36)	38,395	78–53	W1

September: 15–10 (Home: 10–4; Away: 5–6)

#	Date	Opponent	Score	Win	Loss	Save	Attendance	Record	Streak
132	September 1	Orioles	14–3	**Morris** (16–10)	Rhodes (0–2)		31,435	79–53	W2
133	September 2	Indians	9–3	**Erickson** (17–6)	King (5–9)	**Aguilera** (37)	28,267	80–53	W3
134	September 4	Indians	4–8	Blair (2–2)	**West** (4–4)	Hillegas (7)	19,760	80–54	L1
135	September 6	Yankees	3–1	**Tapani** (14–7)	Taylor (7–8)	**Aguilera** (38)	27,804	81–54	W1
136	September 7	Yankees	3–2 (10)	**Willis** (8–3)	Guetterman (3–3)		35,504	82–54	W2
137	September 8	Yankees	6–5	**Erickson** (18–6)	Johnson (5–10)	**Bedrosian** (6)	27,281	83–54	W3
138	September 9	@ Royals	10–4	**Edens** (1–1)	Boddicker (11–11)	**Wayne** (1)	22,189	84–54	W4
139	September 10	@ Royals	7–2	**Anderson** (5–8)	Gubicza (8–9)	**Aguilera** (39)	19,923	85–54	W5
140	September 11	@ Royals	1–4	M. Davis (5–1)	**Tapani** (14–8)	Montgomery (28)	18,290	85–55	L1
141	September 12	@ Rangers	3–4	Ryan (10–6)	**Morris** (16–11)	Jeff Russell (27)	17,974	85–56	L2
142	September 13	@ Rangers	7–3 (10)	**Leach** (1–1)	Rogers (9–10)		24,386	86–56	W1
143	September 14	@ Rangers	0–3	Boyd (2–5)	**Edens** (1–2)	Rogers (5)	40,718	86–57	L1
144	September 15	@ Rangers	2–4	Guzmán (12–5)	**Anderson** (5–9)	Jeff Russell (28)	19,778	86–58	L2
145	September 16	Royals	9–0	**Tapani** (15–8)	Gubicza (8–10)		18,745	87–58	W1
146	September 17	Royals	1–4	Saberhagen (11–8)	**Morris** (16–12)	Montgomery (29)	22,067	87–59	L1
147	September 18	Royals	4–10	Aquino (8–3)	**Erickson** (18–7)		21,726	87–60	L2
148	September 20	Rangers	6–4	**Wayne** (1–0)	Rosenthal (1–3)	**Aguilera** (40)	29,503	88–60	W1
149	September 21	Rangers	8–4	**Tapani** (16–8)	Guzmán (12–6)		43,138	89–60	W2
150	September 22	Rangers	9–4	**Morris** (17–12)	Fajardo (0–1)		44,539	90–60	W3
151	September 24	White Sox	9–2	**Erickson** (19–7)	McDowell (17–10)		45,496	91–60	W4
152	September 25	White Sox	1–6	Fernandez (9–12)	**Anderson** (5–10)		43,450	91–61	L1
153	September 27	@ Blue Jays	2–7	Guzmán (9–2)	**Tapani** (16–9)		50,326	91–62	L2
154	September 28	@ Blue Jays	5–0	**Morris** (18–12)	Candiotti (13–13)		50,319	92–62	W1
155	September 29	@ Blue Jays	1–2	Stottlemyre (14–8)	**Erickson** (19–8)	D. Ward (20)	50,315	92–63	L1
156	September 30	@ White Sox	8–3	**Edens** (2–2)	Fernandez (9–13)		37,740	93–63	W1

October: 2–4 (Home: 1–2; Away: 1–2)

#	Date	Opponent	Score	Win	Loss	Save	Attendance	Record	Streak
157	October 1	@ White Sox	3–2	**Guthrie** (7–5)	Pérez (8–7)	**Aguilera** (41)	32,181	94–63	W2
—	October 2	@ White Sox	Postponed (rain); Makeup: October 3						
158	October 3	@ White Sox	2–3 (10)	Radinsky (5–5)	**Aguilera** (4–5)		–	94–64	L1
159	October 3	@ White Sox	12–13 (12)	Drahman (3–2)	**Leach** (1–2)		31,022	94–65	L2
160	October 4	Blue Jays	1–4	Stottlemyre (15–8)	**Neagle** (0–1)	D. Ward (22)	35,124	94–66	L3
161	October 5	Blue Jays	3–1	**Erickson** (20–8)	Guzmán (10–3)	**Aguilera** (42)	51,058	95–66	W1
162	October 6	Blue Jays	2–3 (10)	Weathers (1–0)	**Anderson** (5–11)	D. Ward (23)	37,794	95–67	L1

=== Notable transactions ===
- April 2, 1991: Nelson Liriano was released by the Twins.
- May 10, 1991: Carmelo Castillo was released by the Minnesota Twins.
- June 3, 1991: 1991 Major League Baseball draft
  - David McCarty was drafted by the Twins in the 1st round (3rd pick).
  - Scott Stahoviak was drafted by the Twins in the 1st round (27th pick).
  - LaTroy Hawkins was drafted by the Twins in the 7th round.
  - Brad Radke was drafted by the Twins in the 8th round.
  - Matt Lawton was drafted by the Twins in the 13th round.
- December 19, 1991: Brian Harper was signed as a free agent with the Minnesota Twins.

== Player stats ==
=== Batting ===
==== Starters by position ====
Note: Pos = Position; G = Games played; AB = At bats; H = Hits; Avg. = Batting average; HR = Home runs; RBI = Runs batted in

Pos	Player	G	AB	H	Avg.	HR	RBI
C	Brian Harper	123	441	137	.311	10	69
1B	Kent Hrbek	132	462	131	.284	20	89
2B	Chuck Knoblauch	151	565	159	.281	1	50
3B	Mike Pagliarulo	121	365	102	.279	6	36
SS	Greg Gagne	139	408	108	.265	8	42
LF	Dan Gladden	126	461	114	.247	6	52
CF	Kirby Puckett	152	611	195	.319	15	89
RF	Shane Mack	143	442	137	.310	18	74
DH	Chili Davis	153	534	148	.277	29	93

==== Other batters ====
Note: G = Games played; AB = At bats; H = Hits; Avg. = Batting average; HR = Home runs; RBI = Runs batted in

Player	G	AB	H	Avg.	HR	RBI
Gene Larkin	98	255	73	.286	2	19
Al Newman	118	246	47	.191	0	19
Scott Leius	109	199	57	.286	5	20
Randy Bush	93	165	50	.303	6	23
Pedro Muñoz	51	138	39	.283	7	26
Junior Ortiz	61	134	28	.209	0	11
Paul Sorrento	26	47	12	.255	4	13
Jarvis Brown	38	37	8	.216	0	0
Lenny Webster	18	34	10	.294	3	8
Carmelo Castillo	9	12	2	.167	0	0

=== Pitching ===
==== Starting pitchers ====
Note: G = Games pitched; IP = Innings pitched; W = Wins; L = Losses; ERA = Earned run average; SO = Strikeouts

Player	G	IP	W	L	ERA	SO
Jack Morris	34	246.2	18	12	3.43	163
Kevin Tapani	35	244.2	16	9	2.99	135
Scott Erickson	32	204.0	20	8	3.18	108
Allan Anderson	29	134.1	5	11	4.96	51
David West	15	71.1	4	4	4.54	52

==== Other pitchers ====
Note: G = Games pitched; IP = Innings pitched; W = Wins; L = Losses; ERA = Earned run average; SO = Strikeouts

Player	G	IP	W	L	ERA	SO
Paul Abbott	15	47.1	3	1	4.75	43
Tom Edens	8	33.0	2	2	4.09	19
Denny Neagle	7	20.0	0	1	4.05	14
Larry Casian	15	18.1	0	0	7.36	6
Willie Banks	5	17.1	1	1	5.71	16
Gary Wayne	8	12.1	1	0	5.11	7

==== Relief pitchers ====
Note: G = Games pitched; W = Wins; L = Losses; SV = Saves; ERA = Earned run average; SO = Strikeouts

Player	G	W	L	SV	ERA	SO
Rick Aguilera	63	4	5	42	2.35	61
Mark Guthrie	41	7	5	2	4.32	72
Carl Willis	40	8	3	2	2.63	53
Steve Bedrosian	56	5	3	6	4.42	44
Terry Leach	50	1	2	0	3.61	32

== Postseason ==
Seven players and five of the coaching staff from the 1987 World Champions repeated as 1991 World Champions.

Only one man has been a part of each of the three Minnesota Twins World Series teams: Tony Oliva. An outfielder in 1965, he was the hitting coach on the 1987 team and bench coach in 1991.

== Awards and honors ==
- Kent Hrbek, Lou Gehrig Award
- Jack Morris, Babe Ruth Award
- Jack Morris, World Series Most Valuable Player
- Kirby Puckett, ALCS Most Valuable Player
- Chuck Knoblauch, 1991 AL Rookie of the Year

All-Star Game

- The Twins had three All-Stars in the 1991 All-Star Game: closer Rick Aguilera, pitcher Jack Morris, and center fielder Kirby Puckett. Scott Erickson would have started the all-star game had he not been injured in a start at home against the Chicago White Sox in June.

== Other post-season awards ==
- Calvin R. Griffith Award (Most Valuable Twin) – Jack Morris
- Joseph W. Haynes Award (Twins Pitcher of the Year) – Jack Morris
- Bill Boni Award (Twins Outstanding Rookie) – Chuck Knoblauch
- Charles O. Johnson Award (Most Improved Twin) – Shane Mack
- Dick Siebert Award (Upper Midwest Player of the Year) – Jack Morris
  - The above awards are voted on by the Twin Cities chapter of the BBWAA
- Sherry Robertson Award (Twins Outstanding Farm System Player) – Pat Mahomes

== Farm system ==
Level	Team	League	Manager
AAA	Portland Beavers	Pacific Coast League	Russ Nixon
AA	Orlando Sun Rays	Southern League	Scott Ullger
A	Visalia Oaks	California League	Steve Liddle
A	Kenosha Twins	Midwest League	Joel Lepel
Rookie	Elizabethton Twins	Appalachian League	Ray Smith
Rookie	GCL Twins	Gulf Coast League	Dan Rohn

LEAGUE CHAMPIONS: Orlando
