= 1991 Texas Rangers season =

1991 Texas Rangers
- League: American League
- Division: West
- Ballpark: Arlington Stadium
- City: Arlington, Texas
- Record: 85–77 (.525)
- Divisional place: 3rd
- Owners: George W. Bush
- General managers: Tom Grieve
- Managers: Bobby Valentine
- Television: KTVT (Jim Sundberg, Steve Busby); HSE (Greg Lucas, Norm Hitzges)
- Radio: WBAP (Eric Nadel, Mark Holtz )

The 1991 Texas Rangers season was the 31st of the Texas Rangers franchise overall, their 20th in Arlington as the Rangers, and the 20th season at Arlington Stadium. The Rangers finished third in the American League West with a record of 85 wins and 77 losses.

== Offseason ==
- December 12, 1990: Scott Coolbaugh was traded by the Rangers to the San Diego Padres for Mark Parent.
- December 14, 1990: Mario Díaz was signed as a free agent with the Texas Rangers.
- January 25, 1991: Rich Gossage was signed as a free agent by the Rangers.

== Regular season ==
- September 30, 1991: Nolan Ryan struck out Tino Martinez for the 5500th strikeout in his career.
- Juan González became the 18th player in Major League history to have a 100 RBI season before his 22nd birthday.

=== Nolan Ryan's 7th No-Hitter ===
- May 1, 1991 – Nolan Ryan threw the seventh no-hitter of his career against the Toronto Blue Jays. Of the 122 pitches that Ryan threw, 83 were strikes.

==== Scorecard ====
May 1, Arlington Stadium, Arlington, Texas

Team	1	2	3	4	5	6	7	8	9	R	H	E
Toronto	0	0	0	0	0	0	0	0	0	0	0	3
Texas	0	0	3	0	0	0	0	0	0	3	8	1
W: Nolan Ryan L: Jimmy Key
HRs: Rubén Sierra, Attendance: 33,439. Length of game: 2:25. Umpires: HP: Tschida, 1B: Coble, 2B: Shulock, 3B: Johnson

===== Batting =====
Toronto Blue Jays	AB	R	H	RBI	Texas Rangers	AB	R	H	RBI
Devon White, cf	4	0	0	0	Gary Pettis, cf	4	1	1	0
Roberto Alomar, 2b	4	0	0	0	Jack Daugherty, lf	4	0	1	0
Kelly Gruber, 3b	2	0	0	0	Rafael Palmeiro, 1b	4	1	2	0
Joe Carter, lf	2	0	0	0	Rubén Sierra, rf	4	1	1	2
John Olerud, 1b	3	0	0	0	Julio Franco, 2b	4	0	0	0
Mark Whiten, rf	3	0	0	0	Juan Gonzalez, dh	3	0	1	0
Glenallen Hill, dh	3	0	0	0	Mike Stanley, c	3	0	1	0
Greg Myers, c	3	0	0	0	Steve Buechele, 3b	4	0	1	0
Manuel Lee, ss	3	0	0	0	Jeff Huson, ss	2	0	0	0
Totals	27	0	0	0	Totals	32	3	8	2

===== Pitching =====
Texas Rangers	IP	H	R	ER	BB	SO
Nolan Ryan, W	9.0	0	0	0	2	16
Totals	9.0	0	0	0	2	16

Toronto Blue Jays	IP	H	R	ER	BB	SO
Jimmy Key, L	6.0	5	3	3	1	5
Bob MacDonald	1	2	0	0	0	2
Willie Fraser	1	1	0	0	0	0
Totals	8.0	8	3	3	1	7

=== Season standings ===
AL West
Team	W	L	Pct.	GB	Home	Road
Minnesota Twins	95	67	.586	—	51‍–‍30	44‍–‍37
Chicago White Sox	87	75	.537	8	46‍–‍35	41‍–‍40
Texas Rangers	85	77	.525	10	46‍–‍35	39‍–‍42
Oakland Athletics	84	78	.519	11	47‍–‍34	37‍–‍44
Seattle Mariners	83	79	.512	12	45‍–‍36	38‍–‍43
Kansas City Royals	82	80	.506	13	40‍–‍41	42‍–‍39
California Angels	81	81	.500	14	40‍–‍41	41‍–‍40

=== Record vs. opponents ===
1991 American League record Sources:
Team	BAL	BOS	CAL	CWS	CLE	DET	KC	MIL	MIN	NYY	OAK	SEA	TEX	TOR
Baltimore	—	8–5	6–6	4–8	7–6	5–8	4–8	3–10	4–8	5–8	3–9	4–8	9–3	5–8
Boston	5–8	—	4–8	7–5	9–4	5–8	7–5	7–6	3–9	6–7	8–4	9–3	5–7	9–4
California	6–6	8–4	—	8–5	7–5	5–7	9–4	6–6	8–5	6–6	1–12	6–7	5–8	6–6
Chicago	8–4	5–7	5–8	—	6–6	4–8	7–6	7–5	8–5	8–4	7–6	7–6	8–5	7–5
Cleveland	6–7	4–9	5–7	6–6	—	7–6	4–8	5–8	2–10	6–7	5–7	2–10	4–8	1–12
Detroit	8–5	8–5	7–5	8–4	6–7	—	8–4	4–9	4–8	8–5	4–8	8–4	6–6	5–8
Kansas City	8–4	5–7	4–9	6–7	8–4	4–8	—	9–3	6–7	7–5	6–7	7–6	7–6	5–7
Milwaukee	10–3	6–7	6–6	5–7	8–5	9–4	3–9	—	6–6	6–7	8–4	3–9	7–5	6–7
Minnesota	8–4	9–3	5–8	5–8	10–2	8–4	7–6	6–6	—	10–2	8–5	9–4	6–7	4–8
New York	8–5	7–6	6–6	4–8	7–6	5–8	5–7	7–6	2–10	—	6–6	3–9	5–7	6–7
Oakland	9–3	4–8	12–1	6–7	7–5	8–4	7–6	4–8	5–8	6–6	—	6–7	4–9	6–6
Seattle	8–4	3–9	7–6	6–7	10–2	4–8	6–7	9–3	4–9	9–3	7–6	—	5–8	5–7
Texas	3–9	7–5	8–5	5–8	8–4	6–6	6–7	5–7	7–6	7–5	9–4	8–5	—	6–6
Toronto	8–5	4–9	6–6	5–7	12–1	8–5	7–5	7–6	8–4	7–6	6–6	7–5	6–6	—

=== Notable transactions ===
- April 7, 1991: Denny Walling was signed as a free agent by the Rangers.
- June 2, 1991: Steve Balboni was signed as a free agent by the Rangers.
- June 22, 1991: Denny Walling was released by the Rangers.
- July 21, 1991: Jonathan Hurst, Joey Eischen and a player to be named later were traded by the Rangers to the Montreal Expos for Oil Can Boyd. The Texas Rangers completed their trade by sending Travis Buckley (minors) to the Expos on September 1.

=== Roster ===
1991 Texas Rangers
Roster
Pitchers: 48 Gerald Alexander; 28 Brad Arnsberg; 27 John Barfield; 44 Joe Bitker; 45 Brian Bohanon; 29 Oil Can Boyd; 41 Kevin Brown; 43 Scott Chiamparino; 44 Héctor Fajardo; 54 Goose Gossage; 23 José Guzmán; 30 Mike Jeffcoat; 44 Barry Manuel; 38 Terry Mathews; 42 Eric Nolte; 56 Mark Petkovsek; 52 Jim Poole; 37 Kenny Rogers; 52 Wayne Rosenthal; 40 Jeff Russell; 34 Nolan Ryan; 32 Calvin Schiraldi; 36 Bobby Witt	Catchers: 7 Chad Kreuter; 10 Mark Parent; 12 Geno Petralli; 7 Iván Rodríguez; 5 Mike Stanley; Infielders: 22 Steve Buechele; 6 Mario Díaz; 14 Julio Franco; 1 Gary Green; 3 José Hernández; 9 Jeff Huson; 39 Rob Maurer; 25 Rafael Palmeiro; 16 Dean Palmer; 3 Denny Walling	Outfielders: 10 Nick Capra; 8 Jack Daugherty; 4 Monty Fariss; 19 Juan González; 33 Donald Harris; 24 Gary Pettis; 47 Kevin Reimer; 17 John Russell; 18 Tony Scruggs; 21 Rubén Sierra; Other batters: 55 Brian Downing	Manager: 2 Bobby Valentine; Coaches: 13 Orlando Gómez (Bench); 11 Toby Harrah (First Base); 35 Tom House (Pitching); 15 Davey Lopes (Assistant); 26 Dave Oliver (Third Base); 31 Tom Robson (Hitting)

== Player stats ==
=== Batting ===
==== Starters by position ====
Note: Pos = Position; G = Games played; AB = At bats; H = Hits; Avg. = Batting average; HR = Home runs; RBI = Runs batted in

Pos	Player	G	AB	H	Avg.	HR	RBI
C	Iván Rodríguez	88	280	74	.264	3	27
1B	Rafael Palmeiro	159	631	203	.322	26	88
2B	Julio Franco	146	589	201	.341	15	78
3B	Steve Buechele	121	416	111	.267	18	66
SS	Jeff Huson	119	268	57	.213	2	26
LF	Juan González	142	545	144	.264	27	102
CF	Gary Pettis	137	282	61	.216	0	19
RF	Rubén Sierra	161	661	203	.307	25	116
DH	Brian Downing	123	407	113	.278	17	49

==== Other batters ====
Note: G = Games played; AB = At bats; H = Hits; Avg. = Batting average; HR = Home runs; RBI = Runs batted in

Player	G	AB	H	Avg.	HR	RBI
Kevin Reimer	136	394	106	.269	20	69
Dean Palmer	81	268	50	.187	15	37
Geno Petralli	87	199	54	.271	2	20
Mario Díaz	96	182	48	.264	1	22
Mike Stanley	95	181	45	.249	3	25
Jack Daugherty	58	144	28	.194	1	11
José Hernández	45	98	18	.184	0	4
Denny Walling	24	44	4	.091	0	2
Monty Fariss	19	31	8	.258	1	6
John Russell	22	27	3	.111	0	1
Gary Green	8	20	3	.150	0	1
Rob Maurer	13	16	1	.063	0	2
Donald Harris	18	8	3	.375	1	2
Tony Scruggs	5	6	0	.000	0	0
Chad Kreuter	3	4	0	.000	0	0
Mark Parent	3	1	0	.000	0	0
Nick Capra	2	0	0	----	0	0

=== Pitching ===
==== Starting pitchers ====
Note: G = Games pitched; IP = Innings pitched; W = Wins; L = Losses; ERA = Earned run average; SO = Strikeouts

Player	G	IP	W	L	ERA	SO
Kevin Brown	33	210.0	9	12	4.40	96
Nolan Ryan	27	173.0	12	6	2.91	203
José Guzmán	25	169.2	13	7	3.08	125
Bobby Witt	17	88.2	3	7	6.09	82
Oil Can Boyd	12	62.0	2	7	6.68	33
Brian Bohanon	11	61.1	4	3	4.84	34
Scott Chiamparino	5	22.1	1	0	4.03	8
Héctor Fajardo	4	19.0	0	2	5.68	15

==== Other pitchers ====
Note: G = Games pitched; IP = Innings pitched; W = Wins; L = Losses; ERA = Earned run average; SO = Strikeouts

Player	G	IP	W	L	ERA	SO
Gerald Alexander	30	89.1	5	3	5.24	50
John Barfield	28	83.1	4	4	4.54	27
Mark Petkovsek	4	9.1	0	1	14.46	6

==== Relief pitchers ====
Note: G = Games pitched; W = Wins; L = Losses; SV = Saves; ERA = Earned run average; SO = Strikeouts

Player	G	W	L	SV	ERA	SO
Jeff Russell	68	6	4	30	3.29	52
Mike Jeffcoat	70	5	3	1	4.63	43
Kenny Rogers	63	10	10	5	5.42	73
Rich Gossage	44	4	2	1	3.57	28
Wayne Rosenthal	36	1	4	1	5.25	61
Terry Mathews	34	4	0	1	3.61	51
Joe Bitker	9	1	0	0	6.75	16
Brad Arnsberg	9	0	1	0	8.38	8
Barry Manuel	8	1	0	0	1.13	5
Jim Poole	5	0	0	1	4.50	4
Calvin Schiraldi	3	0	1	0	11.57	1
Eric Nolte	3	0	0	0	3.38	1

== Awards and honors ==
- Julio Franco, A.L. Batting Title
- Julio Franco, Silver Slugger Award
- José Guzmán, Comeback Player of The Year

All-Star Game

== Farm system ==
Level	Team	League	Manager
AAA	Oklahoma City 89ers	American Association	Tommy Thompson
AA	Tulsa Drillers	Texas League	Bobby Jones
A	Charlotte Rangers	Florida State League	Bob Molinaro
A	Gastonia Rangers	South Atlantic League	Bump Wills
Rookie	GCL Rangers	Gulf Coast League	Chino Cadahia
Rookie	Butte Copper Kings	Pioneer League	Dick Egan
