= 1991 California Angels season =

Major League Baseball season

1991 California Angels
- League: American League
- Division: West
- Ballpark: Anaheim Stadium
- City: Anaheim, California
- Record: 81–81 (.500)
- Divisional place: 7th
- Owner: Gene Autry
- General managers: Mike Port, Dan O'Brien Sr.
- Managers: Doug Rader, Buck Rodgers
- Television: KTLA; SportsChannel Los Angeles (Ken Wilson, Ken Brett)
- Radio: KMPC (Bob Jamison, Al Conin); XPRS (Ruben Valentin, Ulpiano Cos Villa)
- Stats: ESPN.com; Baseball Reference

The 1991 California Angels season was the 31st season of the California Angels franchise in the American League, the 26th in Anaheim, and their 26th season playing their home games at Anaheim Stadium. The Angels finished seventh in the American League West with a record of 81 wins and 81 losses.

== Offseason ==
- December 2, 1990: Devon White was traded by the California Angels with Willie Fraser and Marcus Moore to the Toronto Blue Jays for a player to be named later, Junior Felix, and Luis Sojo. The Toronto Blue Jays sent Ken Rivers (minors) (December 4, 1990) to the California Angels to complete the trade.
- December 13, 1990: Max Venable was signed as a free agent with the California Angels.
- March 14, 1991: Dante Bichette was traded by the California Angels to the Milwaukee Brewers for Dave Parker.

== Regular season ==
=== Season standings ===
AL West
Team	W	L	Pct.	GB	Home	Road
Minnesota Twins	95	67	.586	—	51‍–‍30	44‍–‍37
Chicago White Sox	87	75	.537	8	46‍–‍35	41‍–‍40
Texas Rangers	85	77	.525	10	46‍–‍35	39‍–‍42
Oakland Athletics	84	78	.519	11	47‍–‍34	37‍–‍44
Seattle Mariners	83	79	.512	12	45‍–‍36	38‍–‍43
Kansas City Royals	82	80	.506	13	40‍–‍41	42‍–‍39
California Angels	81	81	.500	14	40‍–‍41	41‍–‍40

=== Record vs. opponents ===
1991 American League record Sources:
Team	BAL	BOS	CAL	CWS	CLE	DET	KC	MIL	MIN	NYY	OAK	SEA	TEX	TOR
Baltimore	—	8–5	6–6	4–8	7–6	5–8	4–8	3–10	4–8	5–8	3–9	4–8	9–3	5–8
Boston	5–8	—	4–8	7–5	9–4	5–8	7–5	7–6	3–9	6–7	8–4	9–3	5–7	9–4
California	6–6	8–4	—	8–5	7–5	5–7	9–4	6–6	8–5	6–6	1–12	6–7	5–8	6–6
Chicago	8–4	5–7	5–8	—	6–6	4–8	7–6	7–5	8–5	8–4	7–6	7–6	8–5	7–5
Cleveland	6–7	4–9	5–7	6–6	—	7–6	4–8	5–8	2–10	6–7	5–7	2–10	4–8	1–12
Detroit	8–5	8–5	7–5	8–4	6–7	—	8–4	4–9	4–8	8–5	4–8	8–4	6–6	5–8
Kansas City	8–4	5–7	4–9	6–7	8–4	4–8	—	9–3	6–7	7–5	6–7	7–6	7–6	5–7
Milwaukee	10–3	6–7	6–6	5–7	8–5	9–4	3–9	—	6–6	6–7	8–4	3–9	7–5	6–7
Minnesota	8–4	9–3	5–8	5–8	10–2	8–4	7–6	6–6	—	10–2	8–5	9–4	6–7	4–8
New York	8–5	7–6	6–6	4–8	7–6	5–8	5–7	7–6	2–10	—	6–6	3–9	5–7	6–7
Oakland	9–3	4–8	12–1	6–7	7–5	8–4	7–6	4–8	5–8	6–6	—	6–7	4–9	6–6
Seattle	8–4	3–9	7–6	6–7	10–2	4–8	6–7	9–3	4–9	9–3	7–6	—	5–8	5–7
Texas	3–9	7–5	8–5	5–8	8–4	6–6	6–7	5–7	7–6	7–5	9–4	8–5	—	6–6
Toronto	8–5	4–9	6–6	5–7	12–1	8–5	7–5	7–6	8–4	7–6	6–6	7–5	6–6	—

=== Transactions ===
- April 1, 1991: Rick Schu was released by the California Angels.
- June 3, 1991: Mark Sweeney was drafted by the California Angels in the 9th round of the 1991 amateur draft. Player signed June 5, 1991.
- July 30, 1991: Shawn Abner was traded by the San Diego Padres to the California Angels for Jack Howell.
- September 7, 1991: Dave Parker was released by the California Angels.

=== Roster ===
1991 California Angels
Roster
Pitchers: 25 Jim Abbott; 59 Kyle Abbott; 43 Scott Bailes; 23 Floyd Bannister; 36 Chris Beasley; 45 Mark Eichhorn; 48 Mike Fetters; 31 Chuck Finley; 20 Joe Grahe; 34 Bryan Harvey; 12 Mark Langston; 46 Scott Lewis; 15 Kirk McCaskill; 33 Bob McClure; 49 Jeff Robinson; 36 Fernando Valenzuela; 35 Cliff Young	Catchers: 14 John Orton; 13 Lance Parrish; 24 Ron Tingley; Infielders: 44 Chris Cron; 11 Gary DiSarcina; 38 Kevin Flora; 3 Gary Gaetti; 18 Donnie Hill; 16 Jack Howell; 21 Wally Joyner; 41 Barry Lyons; 41 Mike Marshall; 6 Bobby Rose; 17 Dick Schofield; 10 Luis Sojo; 9 Lee Stevens	Outfielders: 16 Shawn Abner; 30 Rubén Amaro, Jr.; 40 Mark Davis; 47 Junior Félix; 27 Dave Gallagher; 22 Luis Polonia; 8 Max Venable; 32 Dave Winfield; Other batters: 39 Dave Parker	Manager: 4 Doug Rader; 37 Buck Rodgers; Coaches: 30 Bruce Hines; 2 Deron Johnson; 1 Bobby Knoop; 53 Marcel Lachemann; 47 Frank Reberger; 50 Jimmie Reese

== Player stats ==
=== Batting ===
==== Starters by position ====
Note: G = Games played; AB = At bats; H = Hits; Avg. = Batting average; HR = Home runs; RBI = Runs batted in

Pos.	Player	G	AB	H	Avg.	HR	RBI
C	Lance Parrish	119	402	87	.216	19	51
1B	Wally Joyner	143	551	166	.301	21	96
2B	Luis Sojo	113	364	94	.258	3	20
3B	Gary Gaetti	152	586	144	.246	18	66
SS	Dick Schofield	134	427	96	.225	0	31
LF	Luis Polonia	150	604	179	.296	2	50
CF	Junior Félix	66	230	65	.283	2	26
RF	Dave Winfield	150	568	149	.262	28	86
DH	Dave Parker	119	466	108	.232	11	56

==== Other batters ====
Note: G = Games played, AB = At bats; H = Hits; Avg. = Batting average; HR = Home runs; RBI = Runs batted in

Player	G	AB	H	Avg.	HR	RBI
Dave Gallagher	90	270	79	.293	1	30
Donnie Hill	77	209	50	.239	1	20
Max Venable	82	187	46	.246	3	21
Ron Tingley	45	115	23	.200	1	13
Shawn Abner	41	101	23	.228	2	9
Jack Howell	32	81	17	.210	2	7
John Orton	29	69	14	.203	0	3
Bobby Rose	22	65	18	.277	1	8
Lee Stevens	18	58	17	.293	0	9
Gary DiSarcina	18	57	12	.211	0	3
Rubén Amaro Jr.	10	23	5	.217	0	2
Chris Cron	6	15	2	.133	0	0
Kevin Flora	3	8	1	.125	0	0
Mike Marshall	2	7	0	.000	0	0
Barry Lyons	2	5	1	.200	0	0
Mark Davis	3	2	0	.000	0	0

=== Starting pitchers ===
Note: G = Games pitched; IP = Innings pitched; W = Wins; L = Losses; ERA = Earned run average; SO = Strikeouts

Player	G	IP	W	L	ERA	SO
Mark Langston	34	246.1	19	8	3.00	183
Jim Abbott	34	243.0	18	11	2.89	158
Chuck Finley	34	227.1	18	9	3.80	171
Kirk McCaskill	30	177.2	10	19	4.26	71
Fernando Valenzuela	2	6.2	0	2	12.15	5

==== Other pitchers ====
Note: G = Games pitched; IP = Innings pitched; W = Wins; L = Losses; ERA = Earned run average; SO = Strikeouts

Player	G	IP	W	L	ERA	SO
Joe Grahe	18	73.0	3	7	4.81	40
Scott Lewis	16	60.1	3	5	6.27	37
Mike Fetters	19	44.2	2	5	4.84	24
Kyle Abbott	5	19.2	1	2	4.58	12

===== Relief pitchers =====
Note: G = Games pitched; W = Wins; L = Losses; SV = Saves; ERA = Earned run average; SO = Strikeouts

Player	G	W	L	SV	ERA	SO
Bryan Harvey	67	2	4	46	1.60	101
Mark Eichhorn	70	3	3	1	1.98	49
Scott Bailes	42	1	2	0	4.18	41
Jeff Robinson	39	0	3	3	5.37	57
Chris Beasley	22	0	1	0	3.38	14
Floyd Bannister	16	0	0	0	3.96	16
Bob McClure	13	0	0	0	9.31	5
Cliff Young	11	1	0	0	4.26	6

== Farm system ==
Level	Team	League	Manager
AAA	Edmonton Trappers	Pacific Coast League	Mako Oliveras
AA	Midland Angels	Texas League	Don Long
A	Palm Springs Angels	California League	Nate Oliver
A	Quad Cities Angels	Midwest League	Mitch Seoane
A-Short Season	Boise Hawks	Northwest League	Tom Kotchman
Rookie	AZL Angels	Arizona League	Bill Lachemann

LEAGUE CHAMPIONS: Boise

Records
Preceded by 1990	California Angels seasons 1991	Succeeded by 1992
