= Willie Banks (baseball) =

American baseball player (born 1969)

- Pitcher
- Born: February 27, 1969 (age 56); Jersey City, New Jersey, U.S.
- Batted: Right Threw: Right

Professional debut
- MLB: July 31, 1991, for the Minnesota Twins
- NPB: April 4, 1999, for the Orix Blue Wave

Last appearance
- NPB: October 10, 1999, for the Orix Blue Wave
- MLB: September 26, 2002, for the Boston Red Sox

MLB statistics
- Win–loss record: 33–39
- Earned run average: 4.75
- Strikeouts: 428

NPB statistics
- Win–loss record: 3–3
- Earned run average: 3.94
- Strikeouts: 26
- Stats at Baseball Reference

Teams
- Minnesota Twins (1991–1993); Chicago Cubs (1994–1995); Los Angeles Dodgers (1995); Florida Marlins (1995); New York Yankees (1997–1998); Arizona Diamondbacks (1998); Orix BlueWave (1999); Boston Red Sox (2001–2002)
Medals
Men's baseball
Representing United States
World Junior Baseball Championship
| Bronze medal – third place | 1986 Windsor | Team |

Willie Anthony Banks (born February 27, 1969) is an American former pitcher in Major League Baseball who played for the Minnesota Twins, Chicago Cubs, Los Angeles Dodgers, Florida Marlins, New York Yankees, Arizona Diamondbacks and Boston Red Sox.

At St. Anthony's High School, he twice struck out 19 batters in a seven inning game.

Banks was a member of the 1991 World Series champion Minnesota Twins and the 1995 National League Western Division champion Los Angeles Dodgers.

Banks missed the entire 1996 season following shoulder surgery necessitated by a nerve condition.

In nine seasons he had a 33–39 record over 181 games, with 84 games started, 1 complete game, 1 shutout, 40 games finished, 2 saves, 610 1/3 innings pitched, 632 hits allowed, 370 runs allowed, 322 earned runs allowed, 65 home runs allowed, 302 walks allowed, 428 strikeouts, 15 hit batsmen, 41 wild pitches, 2,717 batters faced, 16 intentional walks, 10 balks and a 4.75 ERA.
