= Tony Scruggs =

American baseball player

- Center fielder
- Born: March 19, 1966 (age 60); Riverside, California
- Batted: Right Threw: Right

MLB debut
- April 8, 1991, for the Texas Rangers

Last MLB appearance
- April 20, 1991, for the Texas Rangers

MLB statistics
- Games played: 5
- At bats: 6
- Hits: 0
- Stats at Baseball Reference

Teams
- Texas Rangers (1991)

Anthony Raymond Scruggs (born March 19, 1966) is an American former professional baseball center fielder. He played in Major League Baseball (MLB) for the Texas Rangers in 1991.
