= American League West =

Division of Major League Baseball

- League: American League
- Sport: Major League Baseball
- Founded: 1969
- No. of teams: 5
- Most recent champions: Houston Astros (2026; 8th title)
- Most titles: Athletics (17)

American League West Teams locations

The American League West is one of Major League Baseball's six divisions. The division has five teams as of the 2013 season, but had four teams from 1994 to 2012, and had as many as seven teams before the 1994 realignment. Although its teams currently only reside along the West Coast and in Texas, historically the division has had teams as far east as Chicago and Minnesota. From 1998 (when the NL West expanded to five teams) to 2012, the AL West was the only MLB division with four teams.

== History ==
When MLB split into divisions for the 1969 season, the American League, unlike the National League, split its 12 teams strictly on geography. The six teams located in the Eastern Time Zone were all placed in the AL East, and the remaining six were placed in the AL West.

When the second incarnation of the Washington Senators announced their intention to move to the Dallas–Fort Worth area for the 1972 season and become the Texas Rangers, American League owners voted to switch the Rangers with the Milwaukee Brewers, who began as the Seattle Pilots in 1969. The Chicago White Sox asked the AL to move from West to East, citing that five of the original eight American League franchises were in the East. The Oakland Athletics and Minnesota Twins objected to the White Sox' request; the Twins also did not want the Brewers to leave the West.

In 2013, the Houston Astros went from the National League Central to the AL West. That move gives all six MLB divisions an equal five teams and both leagues an equal 15 teams each.

== Division membership ==
=== Current members ===
- Athletics – Founding member (as the Oakland Athletics)
- Houston Astros – Joined in 2013; formerly from the NL West (1969–1993) and NL Central (1994–2012)
- Los Angeles Angels – Founding member (as the California Angels)
- Seattle Mariners – Joined in 1977 as an expansion team
- Texas Rangers – Joined in 1972; formerly of the AL East (as the Washington Senators (1961–1971))

=== Former members ===
- Chicago White Sox – Founding member; moved to the AL Central in 1994
- Kansas City Royals – Founding member; moved to the AL Central in 1994
- Minnesota Twins – Founding member; moved to the AL Central in 1994
- Milwaukee Brewers – Founding member (as the Seattle Pilots); moved to the AL East in 1972, then to the AL Central in 1994. Later moved to the NL Central in 1998.

=== Membership timeline ===
Place cursor over year for division champion or World Series team.

AL West Division^{[A]}
Years
69	70	71	72	73	74	75	76	77	78	79	80	81	82	83	84	85	86	87	88
California Angels
Chicago White Sox
Kansas City Royals
Minnesota Twins
Oakland Athletics
Seattle; Pilots^{[B]}	Milwaukee; Brewers^{[C]}																		
			Texas Rangers^{[C]}																
								Seattle Mariners^{[D]}											
AL West Division^{[A]}
Years
89	90	91	92	93	94	95	96	97	98	99	00	01	02	03	04	05	06	07	08
California Angels^{[F]}								Anaheim Angels								Los Angeles Angels of Anaheim^{[F]}			
Chicago White Sox^{[E]}																			
Kansas City Royals^{[E]}																			
Minnesota Twins^{[E]}																			
Oakland Athletics
Texas Rangers
Seattle Mariners
AL West Division^{[A]}
Years
09	10	11	12	13	14	15	16	17	18	19	20	21	22	23	24	25	26	27	
Los Angeles Angels of Anaheim^{[F]}							Los Angeles Angels^{[F]}												
Oakland Athletics^{[H]}																Athletics^{[H]}			
Texas Rangers
Seattle Mariners
				Houston Astros^{[G]}															
Team not in division Division Won World Series Division Won AL Championship

^{A} Creation of division due to 1969 expansion, Kansas City and Seattle added.
^{B} Seattle franchise moved to Milwaukee, becoming the Brewers.
^{C} Washington Senators moved to Dallas–Fort Worth, became Texas Rangers and switched divisions with Milwaukee, which moved to the AL East.
^{D} Seattle added in the 1977 league expansion.
^{E} Chicago, Kansas City, and Minnesota moved into the newly created AL Central due to the 1994 realignment.
^{F} In 1997, California Angels become Anaheim Angels. In 2005, Anaheim Angels become Los Angeles Angels of Anaheim. In 2016, Los Angeles Angels of Anaheim become Los Angeles Angels.
^{G} Houston switches leagues from the NL Central.
^{H} Athletics relocated to West Sacramento, California in 2025, and dropped a location moniker. They plan on moving again to Las Vegas in 2028.

== Champions by year ==
- Team names link to the season in which each team played

Year	Winner	Record	%	Playoff Results
1969	Minnesota Twins (1)	97–65	.599	Lost ALCS (Orioles) 3–0
1970	Minnesota Twins (2)	98–64	.605	Lost ALCS (Orioles) 3–0
1971	Oakland Athletics (1)	101–61	.627	Lost ALCS (Orioles) 3–0
1972	Oakland Athletics (2)	93–62	.600	Won ALCS (Tigers) 3–2; Won World Series (Reds) 4–3
1973	Oakland Athletics (3)	94–68	.580	Won ALCS (Orioles) 3–2; Won World Series (Mets) 4–3
1974	Oakland Athletics (4)	90–72	.556	Won ALCS (Orioles) 3–1; Won World Series (Dodgers) 4–1
1975	Oakland Athletics (5)	98–64	.605	Lost ALCS (Red Sox) 3–0
1976	Kansas City Royals (1)	90–72	.556	Lost ALCS (Yankees) 3–2
1977	Kansas City Royals (2)	102–60	.630	Lost ALCS (Yankees) 3–2
1978	Kansas City Royals (3)	92–70	.568	Lost ALCS (Yankees) 3–1
1979	California Angels (1)	88–74	.543	Lost ALCS (Orioles) 3–1
1980	Kansas City Royals (4)	97–65	.599	Won ALCS (Yankees) 3–0; Lost World Series (Phillies) 4–2
1981	Oakland Athletics (6)†	64–45	.587	Won ALDS (Royals) 3–0; Lost ALCS (Yankees) 3–0
1982	California Angels (2)	93–69	.574	Lost ALCS (Brewers) 3–2
1983	Chicago White Sox (1)	99–63	.611	Lost ALCS (Orioles) 3–1
1984	Kansas City Royals (5)	84–78	.519	Lost ALCS (Tigers) 3–0
1985	Kansas City Royals (6)	91–71	.562	Won ALCS (Blue Jays) 4–3; Won World Series (Cardinals) 4–3
1986	California Angels (3)	92–70	.568	Lost ALCS (Red Sox) 4–3
1987	Minnesota Twins (3)	85–77	.525	Won ALCS (Tigers) 4–1; Won World Series (Cardinals) 4–3
1988	Oakland Athletics (7)	104–58	.642	Won ALCS (Red Sox) 4–0; Lost World Series (Dodgers) 4–1
1989	Oakland Athletics (8)	99–63	.611	Won ALCS (Blue Jays) 4–1; Won World Series (Giants) 4–0
1990	Oakland Athletics (9)	103–59	.636	Won ALCS (Red Sox) 4–0; Lost World Series (Reds) 4–0
1991	Minnesota Twins (4)	95–67	.586	Won ALCS (Blue Jays) 4–1; Won World Series (Braves) 4–3
1992	Oakland Athletics (10)	96–66	.593	Lost ALCS (Blue Jays) 4–2
1993	Chicago White Sox (2)	94–68	.580	Lost ALCS (Blue Jays) 4–2
1994§	No playoffs due to 1994–95 Major League Baseball strike			
1995	Seattle Mariners (1)*	79–66	.545	Won ALDS (Yankees) 3–2; Lost ALCS (Indians) 4–2
1996	Texas Rangers (1)	90–72	.556	Lost ALDS (Yankees) 3–1
1997	Seattle Mariners (2)	90–72	.556	Lost ALDS (Orioles) 3–1
1998	Texas Rangers (2)	88–74	.543	Lost ALDS (Yankees) 3–0
1999	Texas Rangers (3)	95–67	.586	Lost ALDS (Yankees) 3–0
2000	Oakland Athletics (11)	91–70	.565	Lost ALDS (Yankees) 3–2
2001	Seattle Mariners (3)	116–46	.716	Won ALDS (Indians) 3–2; Lost ALCS (Yankees) 4–1
2002	Oakland Athletics (12)	103–59	.636	Lost ALDS (Twins) 3–2
2003	Oakland Athletics (13)	96–66	.593	Lost ALDS (Red Sox) 3–2
2004	Anaheim Angels (4)	92–70	.568	Lost ALDS (Red Sox) 3–0
2005	Los Angeles Angels (5)	95–67	.586	Won ALDS (Yankees) 3–2; Lost ALCS (White Sox) 4–1
2006	Oakland Athletics (14)	93–69	.574	Won ALDS (Twins) 3–0; Lost ALCS (Tigers) 4–0
2007	Los Angeles Angels (6)	94–68	.580	Lost ALDS (Red Sox) 3–0
2008	Los Angeles Angels (7)	100–62	.617	Lost ALDS (Red Sox) 3–1
2009	Los Angeles Angels (8)	97–65	.599	Won ALDS (Red Sox) 3–0; Lost ALCS (Yankees) 4–2
2010	Texas Rangers (4)	90–72	.556	Won ALDS (Rays) 3–2; Won ALCS (Yankees) 4–2; Lost World Series (Giants) 4–1
2011	Texas Rangers (5)	96–66	.593	Won ALDS (Rays) 3–1; Won ALCS (Tigers) 4–2; Lost World Series (Cardinals) 4–3
2012	Oakland Athletics (15)	94–68	.580	Lost ALDS (Tigers) 3–2
2013	Oakland Athletics (16)	96–66	.593	Lost ALDS (Tigers) 3–2
2014	Los Angeles Angels (9)	98–64	.605	Lost ALDS (Royals) 3–0
2015	Texas Rangers (6)	88–74	.543	Lost ALDS (Blue Jays) 3–2
2016	Texas Rangers (7)	95–67	.586	Lost ALDS (Blue Jays) 3–0
2017	Houston Astros (1)	101–61	.623	Won ALDS (Red Sox) 3–1; Won ALCS (Yankees) 4–3; Won World Series (Dodgers) 4–3
2018	Houston Astros (2)	103–59	.636	Won ALDS (Indians) 3–0; Lost ALCS (Red Sox) 4–1
2019	Houston Astros (3)	107–55	.660	Won ALDS (Rays) 3–2; Won ALCS (Yankees) 4–2; Lost World Series (Nationals) 4–3
2020††	Oakland Athletics (17)	36–24	.600	Won ALWC (White Sox) 2–1; Lost ALDS (Astros) 3–1
2021	Houston Astros (4)	95–67	.586	Won ALDS (White Sox) 3–1; Won ALCS (Red Sox) 4–2; Lost World Series (Braves) 4–2
2022	Houston Astros (5)	106–56	.654	Won ALDS (Mariners) 3–0; Won ALCS (Yankees) 4–0; Won World Series (Phillies) 4–2
2023	Houston Astros (6)**	90–72	.556	Won ALDS (Twins) 3–1; Lost ALCS (Rangers) 4–3
2024	Houston Astros (7)	88–73	.547	Lost ALWC (Tigers) 2–0
2025	Seattle Mariners (4)	90–72	.556	Won ALDS (Tigers) 3–2; Lost ALCS (Blue Jays) 4–3
2026	Houston Astros (8)	81–81	.500	Lost ALWC (White Sox) 2–0

† – Due to the players' strike, the season was split in two. The Athletics won the first half and defeated the second-half winner, the Kansas City Royals, to win the division.
§ – Due to the 1994–95 Major League Baseball strike, starting on August 12, no official winner was declared. The Texas Rangers were leading in winning percentage at time of the strike.
* – Seattle defeated the California Angels in a one-game playoff for the division title, 9–1.
†† – Due to the COVID-19 pandemic, the season was shortened to 60 games. By virtue of the eight-team postseason format used for that season, division runner-up Houston also qualified for the playoffs.
** – The Astros and Rangers finished tied for first place with identical records. The Astros were declared division winners, due to having won the season series against the Rangers, and the Rangers received the wild card berth.

== Other postseason teams ==
See List of American League Wild Card winners (since 1994)

Year	Winner	Record	%	GB	Playoff Results
2000	Seattle Mariners	91–71	.562	.5	Won ALDS (White Sox) 3–0; Lost ALCS (Yankees) 4–2
2001	Oakland Athletics	102–60	.630	14	Lost ALDS (Yankees) 3–2
2002	Anaheim Angels	99–63	.611	4	Won ALDS (Yankees) 3–1; Won ALCS (Twins) 4–1; Won World Series (Giants) 4–3
2012	Texas Rangers*	93–69	.574	1	Lost ALWC (Orioles)
2014	Oakland Athletics*	88–74	.543	10	Lost ALWC (Royals)
2015	Houston Astros*	86–76	.531	2	Won ALWC (Yankees); Lost ALDS (Royals) 3–2
2018	Oakland Athletics*	97–65	.599	6	Lost ALWC (Yankees)
2019	Oakland Athletics*	97–65	.599	10	Lost ALWC (Rays)
2020	Houston Astros*	29–31	.483	7	Won ALWC (Twins) 2–0; Won ALDS (Athletics) 3–1; Lost ALCS (Rays) 4–3
2022	Seattle Mariners*	90–72	.556	16	Won ALWC (Blue Jays) 2–0; Lost ALDS (Astros) 3–0
2023	Texas Rangers*	90–72	.556	0	Won ALWC (Rays) 2–0; Won ALDS (Orioles) 3–0; Won ALCS (Astros) 4–3; Won World Series (Diamondbacks) 4–1

* – From 2012 to 2019, and in 2021, the Wild Card was expanded to two teams. Those teams faced each other in the Wild Card Game to determine the final participant in the American League Division Series. In 2020 only, eight teams, including the three division winners, played in a best-of-three Wild Card Series, with the winners advancing to the Division Series. Starting in 2022, the Wild Card field was increased to three teams, and along with the lowest-ranked division winner, qualified for the best-of-three Wild Card Series to determine the remaining two slots in the Division Series.

== Season results ==
^{(#)}	Denotes team that won the World Series
^{(#)}	Denotes team that won the American League pennant, but lost World Series
^{(#)}	Denotes team that qualified for the MLB postseason

Season	Team (record)						
Season	1st	2nd	3rd	4th	5th	6th	7th
1969: The American League West was formed with six inaugural members: the California Angels, Chicago White Sox, Kansas City Royals, Minnesota Twins, Oakland Athletics and Seattle Pilots.
1969	Minnesota (97–65)	Oakland (88–74)	California (71–91)	Kansas City (69–93)	Chicago White Sox (68–94)	Seattle (64–98)	
1970: The Seattle Pilots relocated to Milwaukee, Wisconsin as the Milwaukee Brewers.
1970	Minnesota (98–64)	Oakland (89–73)	California (86–76)	Kansas City (65–97)	Milwaukee (65–97)	Chicago White Sox (56–106)	
1971	Oakland (101–60)	Kansas City (85–76)	Chicago White Sox (79–83)	California (76–86)	Minnesota (74–86)	Milwaukee (69–92)	
1972: The Washington Senators relocated to Arlington, Texas as the Texas Rangers and joined the American League West. The Milwaukee Brewers left to join the American League East.
1972	Oakland (93–62)	Chicago White Sox (87–67)	Minnesota (77–77)	Kansas City (76–78)	California (75–80)	Texas (54–100)	
1973	Oakland (94–68)	Kansas City (88–74)	Minnesota (81–81)	California (79–83)	Chicago White Sox (77–85)	Texas (57–105)	
1974	Oakland (90–72)	Texas (84–76)	Minnesota (82–80)	Chicago White Sox (80–80)	Kansas City (77–85)	California (68–94)	
1975	Oakland (98–64)	Kansas City (91–71)	Texas (79–83)	Minnesota (76–83)	Chicago White Sox (75–86)	California (72–89)	
1976	Kansas City (90–72)	Oakland (87–74)	Minnesota (85–77)	Texas (76–86)	California (76–86)	Chicago White Sox (64–97)	
1977: An expansion team, Seattle Mariners, joined the division.
1977	Kansas City (102–60)	Texas (94–68)	Chicago White Sox (90–72)	Minnesota (84–77)	California (74–88)	Seattle (64–98)	Oakland (63–98)
1978	Kansas City (92–70)	Texas (87–75)	California (87–75)	Minnesota (73–89)	Chicago White Sox (71–90)	Oakland (69–93)	Seattle (56–104)
1979	California (88–74)	Kansas City (85–77)	Texas (83–79)	Minnesota (82–80)	Chicago White Sox (73–87)	Seattle (67–95)	Oakland (54–108)
1980	Kansas City (97–65)	Oakland (83–79)	Minnesota (77–84)	Texas (76–85)	Chicago White Sox (70–90)	California (65–95)	Seattle (59–103)
1981: Due to the player's strike, the season was split and a Division Series was created to pit the first and second half champions from each division. The Oakland Athletics won the first half and the Kansas City Royals won the second half. The Athletics won the ALDS 3–0 to claim the American League West championship.
1981	Oakland (64–45)	Texas (57–48)	Chicago White Sox (54–52)	Kansas City (50–53)	California (51–59)	Seattle (44–65)	Minnesota (41–68)
1982	California (93–69)	Kansas City (90–72)	Chicago White Sox (87–75)	Seattle (76–86)	Oakland (68–94)	Texas (64–98)	Minnesota (60–102)
1983	Chicago White Sox (99–63)	Kansas City (79–83)	Texas (77–85)	Oakland (74–88)	California (70–92)	Minnesota (70–92)	Seattle (60–102)
1984	Kansas City (84–78)	California (81–81)	Minnesota (81–81)	Oakland (77–85)	Chicago White Sox (74–88)	Seattle (74–88)	Texas (69–92)
1985	Kansas City (91–71)	California (90–72)	Chicago White Sox (85–77)	Minnesota (77–85)	Oakland (77–85)	Seattle (74–88)	Texas (62–99)
1986	California (92–70)	Texas (87–75)	Kansas City (76–86)	Oakland (76–86)	Chicago White Sox (72–90)	Minnesota (71–91)	Seattle (67–95)
1987	Minnesota (85–77)	Kansas City (83–79)	Oakland (81–81)	Seattle (78–84)	Chicago White Sox (77–85)	Texas (75–87)	California (75–87)
1988	Oakland (104–58)	Minnesota (91–71)	Kansas City (84–77)	California (75–87)	Chicago White Sox (71–90)	Texas (70–91)	Seattle (68–93)
1989	Oakland (99–63)	Kansas City (92–70)	California (91–71)	Texas (83–79)	Minnesota (80–82)	Seattle (73–89)	Chicago White Sox (69–92)
1990	Oakland (103–59)	Chicago White Sox (94–68)	Texas (83–79)	California (80–82)	Seattle (77–85)	Kansas City (75–86)	Minnesota (74–88)
1991	Minnesota (95–67)	Chicago White Sox (87–75)	Texas (85–77)	Oakland (84–78)	Seattle (83–79)	Kansas City (82–80)	California (81–81)
1992	Oakland (96–66)	Minnesota (90–72)	Chicago White Sox (86–76)	Texas (77–85)	California (72–90)	Kansas City (72–90)	Seattle (64–98)
1993	Chicago White Sox (94–68)	Texas (86–76)	Kansas City (84–78)	Seattle (82–80)	California (71–91)	Minnesota (71–91)	Oakland (68–94)
1994: The Chicago White Sox, Kansas City Royals and Minnesota Twins left to join the American League Central. Due to the player's strike, the remainder of the season was cancelled on August 12. The postseason and World Series was also cancelled.
1994	Texas (52–62)	Oakland (51–63)	Seattle (49–63)	California (47–68)			
1995	^{(3)} Seattle^{[a]} (79–66)	California (78–67)	Texas (74–70)	Oakland (67–77)			
1996	^{(3)} Texas (90–72)	Seattle (85–76)	Oakland (78–84)	California (70–91)			
1997: The California Angels rebranded as the Anaheim Angels.
1997	^{(2)} Seattle (90–72)	Anaheim (84–78)	Texas (77–85)	Oakland (65–97)			
1998	^{(3)} Texas (88–74)	Anaheim (85–77)	Seattle (76–85)	Oakland (74–88)			
1999	^{(3)} Texas (95–67)	Oakland (87–75)	Seattle (79–83)	Anaheim (70–92)			
2000	^{(2)} Oakland (91–70)	^{(4)} Seattle (91–71)	Anaheim (82–80)	Texas (71–91)			
2001	^{(1)} Seattle (116–46)	^{(4)} Oakland (102–60)	Anaheim (75–87)	Texas (73–89)			
2002	^{(2)} Oakland (103–59)	^{(4)} Anaheim (99–63)	Seattle (93–69)	Texas (72–90)			
2003	^{(2)} Oakland (96–66)	Seattle (93–69)	Anaheim (77–85)	Texas (71–91)			
2004	^{(2)} Anaheim^{[b]} (92–70)	Oakland (91–71)	Texas (89–73)	Seattle (63–99)			
2005: The Anaheim Angels rebranded as the Los Angeles Angels.
2005	^{(2)} L.A. Angels^{[c]} (95–67)	Oakland (88–74)	Texas (79–83)	Seattle (69–93)			
2006	^{(3)} Oakland (93–69)	L.A. Angels (89–73)	Texas (80–82)	Seattle (78–84)			
2007	^{(3)} L.A. Angels (94–68)	Seattle (88–74)	Oakland (76–86)	Texas (75–87)			
2008	^{(1)} L.A. Angels (100–62)	Texas (79–83)	Oakland (75–86)	Seattle (61–101)			
2009	^{(2)} L.A. Angels (97–65)	Texas (87–75)	Seattle (85–77)	Oakland (75–87)			
2010	^{(3)} Texas (90–72)	Oakland (81–81)	L.A. Angels (80–82)	Seattle (61–101)			
2011	^{(2)} Texas (96–66)	L.A. Angels (86–76)	Oakland (74–88)	Seattle (67–95)			
2012	^{(2)} Oakland (94–68)	^{(4)} Texas (93–69)	L.A. Angels (89–73)	Seattle (75–87)			
2013: The Houston Astros joined from the National League Central.
2013	^{(2)} Oakland (96–66)	Texas^{[d]} (91–72)	L.A. Angels (78–84)	Seattle (71–91)	Houston (51–111)		
2014	^{(1)} L.A. Angels (98–64)	^{(5)} Oakland (88–74)	Seattle (87–75)	Houston (70–92)	Texas (67–95)		
2015	^{(3)} Texas (88–74)	^{(5)} Houston (86–76)	L.A. Angels (85–77)	Seattle (76–86)	Oakland (68–94)		
2016	^{(1)} Texas (95–67)	Seattle (86–76)	Houston (84–78)	L.A. Angels (74–88)	Oakland (69–93)		
2017	^{(2)} Houston (101–61)	L.A. Angels (80–82)	Seattle (78–84)	Texas (78–84)	Oakland (75–87)		
2018	^{(2)} Houston (103–59)	^{(5)} Oakland (97–65)	Seattle (89–73)	L.A. Angels (80–82)	Texas (67–95)		
2019	^{(1)} Houston (107–55)	^{(4)} Oakland (97–65)	Texas (78–84)	L.A. Angels (72–90)	Seattle (68–94)		
2020: Due to the COVID-19 pandemic, the season was shortened to 60 games. The postseason field was expanded to eight teams and the wild-card round became a best-of-three series.
2020	^{(2)} Oakland (36–24)	^{(6)} Houston (29–31)	Seattle (27–33)	L.A. Angels (26–34)	Texas (22–38)		
2021	^{(2)} Houston (95–67)	Seattle (90–72)	Oakland (86–76)	L.A. Angels (77–85)	Texas (60–102)		
2022	^{(1)} Houston (106–56)	^{(5)} Seattle (90–72)	L.A. Angels (73–89)	Texas (68–94)	Oakland (60–102)		
2023	^{(2)} Houston (90–72)	^{(5)} Texas^{[e]} (90–72)	Seattle (88–74)	L.A. Angels (73–89)	Oakland (50–112)		
2024	^{(3)} Houston (88–73)	Seattle (85–77)	Texas (78–84)	Oakland (69–93)	L.A. Angels (63–99)		
2025: The Oakland Athletics temporarily moved to West Sacramento, California while preparing for a new stadium in the Las Vegas suburb of Paradise, Nevada. The team will be renamed as the Athletics without any area identification while in West Sacramento.
2025	^{(2)} Seattle (90–72)	Houston^{[f]} (87–75)	Texas (81–81)	Athletics (76–86)	L.A. Angels (72–90)		
2026	^{(3)} Houston (81–81)	Texas (80–82)	Seattle (76–86)	Athletics (64–98)	L.A. Angels (62–100)		

Notes and tiebreakers

- ^{a} Seattle and California were tied for the division championship and played in a tie-breaker game. The Mariners won 9–1 to claim the division crown.
- ^{b} Anaheim and Minnesota of the American League Central were tied for the second and third seed, but the Angels claimed the second seed by winning the season series 5–4.
- ^{c} Los Angeles and New York Yankees of the American League East were tied for the second and third seed, but the Angels claimed the second seed by winning the season series 6–4.
- ^{d} Texas and Tampa Bay of the American League East were tied for the second wild-card berth and played in a tie-breaker game. The Rangers lost 5–2 and were eliminated from postseason contention.
- ^{e} Texas and Houston were tied for the division lead, but the Astros claimed the division by winning the season series 9–4.
- ^{f} Houston and Detroit of the American League Central were tied for the third wild-card berth, but the Tigers clinched the final postseason spot by winning the season series 4–2.

== AL West statistics ==
Team	Division championships			Postseason records (Note: Reflects postseason record of each team only during the team's time as a member of the AL West)				
Team	Number	Year(s)	Most recent	Wild Card (Note: Number of times qualifying as a wild card team)	ALWC	ALDS	ALCS	World Series
Current Teams in Division
Athletics (Note: Formerly known as Oakland Athletics)	17	1971–1975, 1981, 1988–1990, 1992, 2000, 2002, 2003, 2006, 2012, 2013, 2020	2020	4	1–3	2–7	6–5	4–2
Los Angeles Angels (Note: Formerly known as, Los Angeles Angels of Anaheim, Anaheim Angels, and California Angels)	9	1979, 1982, 1986, 2004, 2005, 2007–2009, 2014	2014	1	0–0	3–4	1–5	1–0
Houston Astros	8	2017–2019, 2021-2024, 2026	2026	2	2–2	7–1	4–3	2–2
Texas Rangers	7	1996, 1998, 1999, 2010, 2011, 2015, 2016	2016	2	1–1	3–5	3–0	1–2
Seattle Mariners	4	1995*, 1997, 2001, 2025	2025	2	1–0	4–2	0–3	0–0
Former Teams in Division
Kansas City Royals†	6	1976–1978, 1980, 1984, 1985	1985	—	—	0–1	2–4	1–1
Minnesota Twins†	4	1969, 1970, 1987, 1991	1991	—	—	0–0	2–2	2–0
Chicago White Sox†	2	1983, 1993	1993	—	—	0–0	0–2	0–0
Milwaukee Brewers / Seattle Pilots§	0	—	—	—	—	—	0–0	0–0
Total	57	1969–1993, 1995–present	2024	11	5‍–‍6	19‍–‍20	18‍–‍24	11‍–‍7

* – Won division via tiebreaker
§ indicates no longer in division since 1972, and no longer part of AL since 1998
† indicates no longer in division since 1994

Totals updated through conclusion of the 2024 postseason.

== Rivalries ==
- Angels–Athletics rivalry
- Angels–Rangers rivalry
- Lone Star Series (Astros–Rangers)

== See also ==
- American League East
- American League Central
- National League East
- National League Central
- National League West
