= 1991 Kansas City Royals season =

1991 Kansas City Royals
- League: American League
- Division: West
- Ballpark: Royals Stadium
- City: Kansas City, Missouri
- Record: 82–80 (.506)
- Divisional place: 6th
- Owners: Ewing Kauffman
- General managers: Herk Robinson
- Managers: John Wathan, Bob Schaefer, Hal McRae
- Television: WDAF-TV (Paul Splittorff, Denny Trease)
- Radio: WIBW (AM) (Denny Matthews, Fred White)

The 1991 Kansas City Royals season was the 23rd season for the franchise, their 19th at Kauffman Stadium and their 5th and final full season under the management of John Wathan. The Royals finished sixth in the American League West with a record of 82 wins and 80 losses, an improvement from 75–86 from the year prior, but were eliminated from postseason contention for the 6th consecutive season.

== Offseason ==
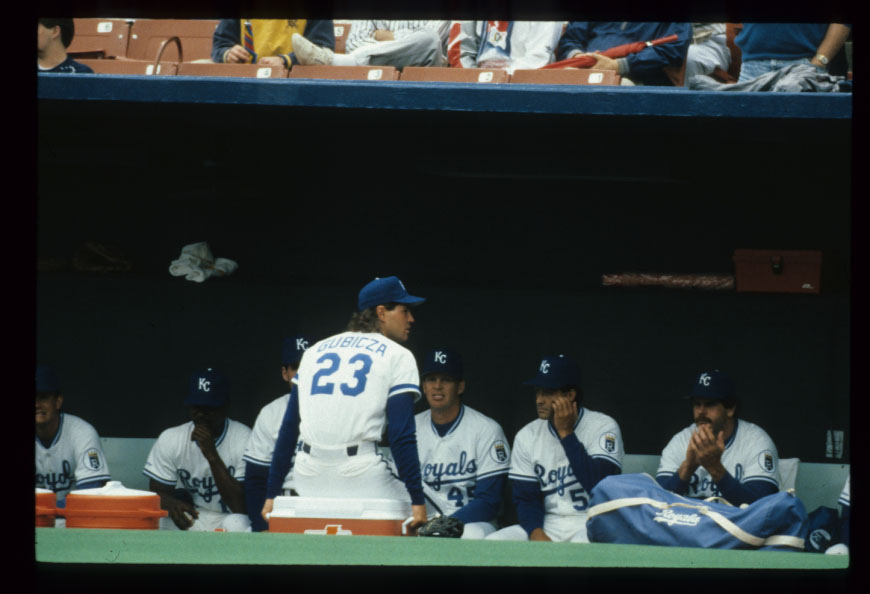
Royals players in the Royals Stadium dugout, 1991

- October 4, 1990: Chris Codiroli was released by the Royals.
- November 21, 1990: Mike Boddicker was signed as a free agent by the Royals.
- December 1, 1990: Kirk Gibson was signed as a free agent by the Royals.
- December 4, 1990: Dan Schatzeder was signed as a free agent by the Royals.
- March 18, 1991: Bo Jackson was released by the Royals.

== Regular season ==
=== Season standings ===
AL West
Team	W	L	Pct.	GB	Home	Road
Minnesota Twins	95	67	.586	—	51‍–‍30	44‍–‍37
Chicago White Sox	87	75	.537	8	46‍–‍35	41‍–‍40
Texas Rangers	85	77	.525	10	46‍–‍35	39‍–‍42
Oakland Athletics	84	78	.519	11	47‍–‍34	37‍–‍44
Seattle Mariners	83	79	.512	12	45‍–‍36	38‍–‍43
Kansas City Royals	82	80	.506	13	40‍–‍41	42‍–‍39
California Angels	81	81	.500	14	40‍–‍41	41‍–‍40

=== Record vs. opponents ===
1991 American League record Sources:
Team	BAL	BOS	CAL	CWS	CLE	DET	KC	MIL	MIN	NYY	OAK	SEA	TEX	TOR
Baltimore	—	8–5	6–6	4–8	7–6	5–8	4–8	3–10	4–8	5–8	3–9	4–8	9–3	5–8
Boston	5–8	—	4–8	7–5	9–4	5–8	7–5	7–6	3–9	6–7	8–4	9–3	5–7	9–4
California	6–6	8–4	—	8–5	7–5	5–7	9–4	6–6	8–5	6–6	1–12	6–7	5–8	6–6
Chicago	8–4	5–7	5–8	—	6–6	4–8	7–6	7–5	8–5	8–4	7–6	7–6	8–5	7–5
Cleveland	6–7	4–9	5–7	6–6	—	7–6	4–8	5–8	2–10	6–7	5–7	2–10	4–8	1–12
Detroit	8–5	8–5	7–5	8–4	6–7	—	8–4	4–9	4–8	8–5	4–8	8–4	6–6	5–8
Kansas City	8–4	5–7	4–9	6–7	8–4	4–8	—	9–3	6–7	7–5	6–7	7–6	7–6	5–7
Milwaukee	10–3	6–7	6–6	5–7	8–5	9–4	3–9	—	6–6	6–7	8–4	3–9	7–5	6–7
Minnesota	8–4	9–3	5–8	5–8	10–2	8–4	7–6	6–6	—	10–2	8–5	9–4	6–7	4–8
New York	8–5	7–6	6–6	4–8	7–6	5–8	5–7	7–6	2–10	—	6–6	3–9	5–7	6–7
Oakland	9–3	4–8	12–1	6–7	7–5	8–4	7–6	4–8	5–8	6–6	—	6–7	4–9	6–6
Seattle	8–4	3–9	7–6	6–7	10–2	4–8	6–7	9–3	4–9	9–3	7–6	—	5–8	5–7
Texas	3–9	7–5	8–5	5–8	8–4	6–6	6–7	5–7	7–6	7–5	9–4	8–5	—	6–6
Toronto	8–5	4–9	6–6	5–7	12–1	8–5	7–5	7–6	8–4	7–6	6–6	7–5	6–6	—

=== Notable transactions ===
- April 5, 1991: Warren Cromartie was signed as a free agent by the Royals.
- May 29, 1991: Dan Schatzeder was released by the Royals.
- June 3, 1991: 1991 Major League Baseball draft
  - Rod Myers was drafted by the Royals in the 13th round.
  - Les Norman was drafted by the Royals in the 25th round. Player signed June 12, 1991.

=== Roster ===
1991 Kansas City Royals
Roster
Pitchers: 55 Kevin Appier; 27 Luis Aquino; 52 Mike Boddicker; 50 Archie Corbin; 28 Steve Crawford; 48 Mark Davis; 14,43 Storm Davis; 39 Wes Gardner; 16 Tom Gordon; 23 Mark Gubicza; 58 Joel Johnston; 57 Mike Magnante; 59 Carlos Maldonado; 38 Andy McGaffigan; 21 Jeff Montgomery; 18 Bret Saberhagen; 43 Dan Schatzeder; 34 Héctor Wagner	Catchers: 15 Mike Macfarlane; 24 Brent Mayne; 53 Jorge Pedre; 7 Tim Spehr; Infielders: 26,38 Todd Benzinger; 47 Sean Berry; 5 George Brett; 39 Stu Cole; 49 Warren Cromartie; 31 David Howard; 2 Nelson Liriano; 13 Carmelo Martínez; 45 Russ Morman; 32 Bill Pecota; 33 Kevin Seitzer; 3 Terry Shumpert; 1 Kurt Stillwell; 17 Paul Zuvella	Outfielders: 26 Dave Clark; 8 Jim Eisenreich; 30 Kirk Gibson; 56 Brian McRae; 9 Bobby Moore; 26 Terry Puhl; 51 Harvey Pulliam; 4 Danny Tartabull; 25 Gary Thurman	Manager: 11 Hal McRae; 42 Bob Schaefer; 12 John Wathan; Coaches: 37 Pat Dobson (pitching); 44 Glenn Ezell (bullpen); 41 Adrian Garrett (third base); 35 Lynn Jones (first base); 42 Bob Schaefer (bench)

== Player stats ==
=== Batting ===
==== Starters by position ====
Note: Pos = Position; G = Games played; AB = At bats; H = Hits; Avg. = Batting average; HR = Home runs; RBI = Runs batted in

Pos	Player	G	AB	H	Avg.	HR	RBI
C	Brent Mayne	85	231	58	.251	3	31
1B	Todd Benzinger	78	293	86	.294	2	40
2B	Terry Shumpert	144	369	80	.217	5	34
3B	Bill Pecota	125	398	114	.286	6	45
SS	Kurt Stillwell	122	385	102	.265	6	51
LF	Kirk Gibson	132	462	109	.236	16	55
CF	Brian McRae	152	629	164	.261	8	64
RF	Danny Tartabull	132	484	153	.316	31	100
DH	George Brett	131	505	129	.255	10	61

==== Other batters ====
Note: G = Games played; AB = At bats; H = Hits; Avg. = Batting average; HR = Home runs; RBI = Runs batted in

Player	G	AB	H	Avg.	HR	RBI
Jim Eisenreich	135	375	113	.301	2	47
Mike Macfarlane	84	267	74	.277	13	41
David Howard	94	236	51	.216	1	17
Kevin Seitzer	85	234	62	.265	1	25
Gary Thurman	80	184	51	.277	2	13
Warren Cromartie	69	131	41	.313	1	20
Carmelo Martínez	44	121	25	.207	4	17
Tim Spehr	37	74	14	.189	3	14
Sean Berry	31	60	8	.133	0	1
Harvey Pulliam	18	33	9	.273	3	4
Russ Morman	12	23	6	.261	0	1
Nelson Liriano	10	22	9	.409	0	1
Jorge Pedre	10	19	5	.263	0	3
Terry Puhl	15	18	4	.222	0	3
Bobby Moore	18	14	5	.357	0	0
Dave Clark	11	10	2	.200	0	1
Stu Cole	9	7	1	.143	0	0
Paul Zuvella	2	0	0	----	0	0

=== Pitching ===
==== Starting pitchers ====
Note: G = Games pitched; IP = Innings pitched; W = Wins; L = Losses; ERA = Earned run average; SO = Strikeouts

Player	G	IP	W	L	ERA	SO
Kevin Appier	34	207.2	13	10	3.42	158
Bret Saberhagen	28	196.1	13	8	3.07	136
Mike Boddicker	30	180.2	12	12	4.08	79
Mark Gubicza	26	133.0	9	12	5.68	89
Héctor Wagner	2	10.0	1	1	7.20	5

==== Other pitchers ====
Note: G = Games pitched; IP = Innings pitched; W = Wins; L = Losses; ERA = Earned run average; SO = Strikeouts

Player	G	IP	W	L	ERA	SO
Tom Gordon	45	158.0	9	14	3.87	167
Luis Aquino	38	157.0	8	4	3.44	80
Storm Davis	51	114.1	3	9	4.96	53
Mark Davis	29	62.2	6	3	4.45	47

==== Relief pitchers ====
Note: G = Games pitched; W = Wins; L = Losses; SV = Saves; ERA = Earned run average; SO = Strikeouts

Player	G	W	L	SV	ERA	SO
Jeff Montgomery	67	4	4	33	2.90	77
Mike Magnante	38	0	1	0	2.45	42
Steve Crawford	33	3	2	1	5.98	38
Joel Johnston	13	1	0	0	0.40	21
Dan Schatzeder	8	0	0	0	9.45	4
Carlos Maldonado	5	0	0	0	8.22	1
Andy McGaffigan	4	0	0	0	4.50	3
Wes Gardner	3	0	0	0	1.59	3
Archie Corbin	2	0	0	0	3.86	1
Bill Pecota	1	0	0	0	4.50	0

== Farm system ==
Level	Team	League	Manager
AAA	Omaha Royals	American Association	Sal Rende
AA	Memphis Chicks	Southern League	Jeff Cox
A	Baseball City Royals	Florida State League	Carlos Tosca
A	Appleton Foxes	Midwest League	Joe Breeden
A-Short Season	Eugene Emeralds	Northwest League	Tom Poquette
Rookie	GCL Royals	Gulf Coast League	Bob Herold
