= Kevin Flora =

American baseball player (born 1969)

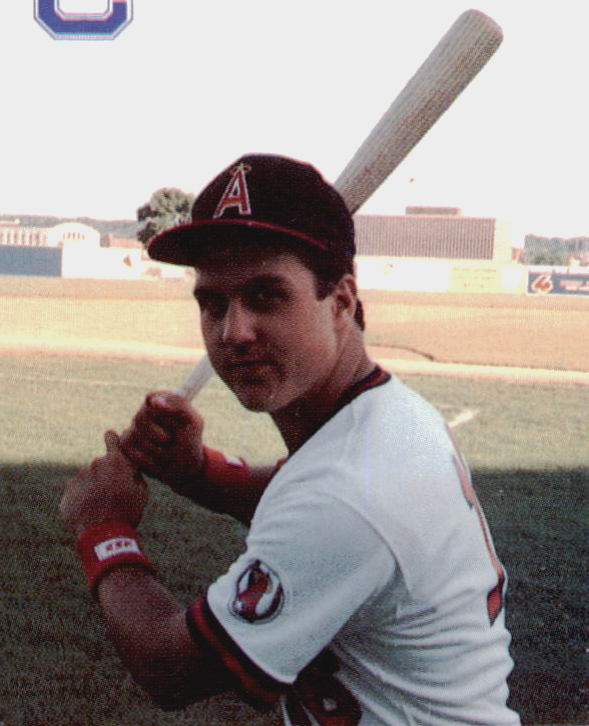
- Flora with the Quad City Angels c. 1988
- Infielder
- Born: June 10, 1969 (age 56); Fontana, California, U.S.
- Batted: Right Threw: Right

MLB debut
- September 27, 1991, for the California Angels

Last MLB appearance
- September 29, 1995, for the Philadelphia Phillies

MLB statistics
- Games played: 29
- Batting average: .202
- Runs scored: 14
- Stats at Baseball Reference

Teams
- California Angels (1991, 1995); Philadelphia Phillies (1995)

Kevin Scot Flora (born June 10, 1969) is an American former professional baseball outfielder, who played in Major League Baseball (MLB) for the California Angels and Philadelphia Phillies, between 1991 and 1995.

Drafted by the California Angels in the 2nd round (57th overall) of the 1987 Major League Baseball draft, Flora would make his big league debut with the Angels on September 27, 1991. He appeared in his final MLB game for the Philadelphia Phillies, on September 29, 1995.
