= Carl Willis =

American baseball player and coach (born 1960)

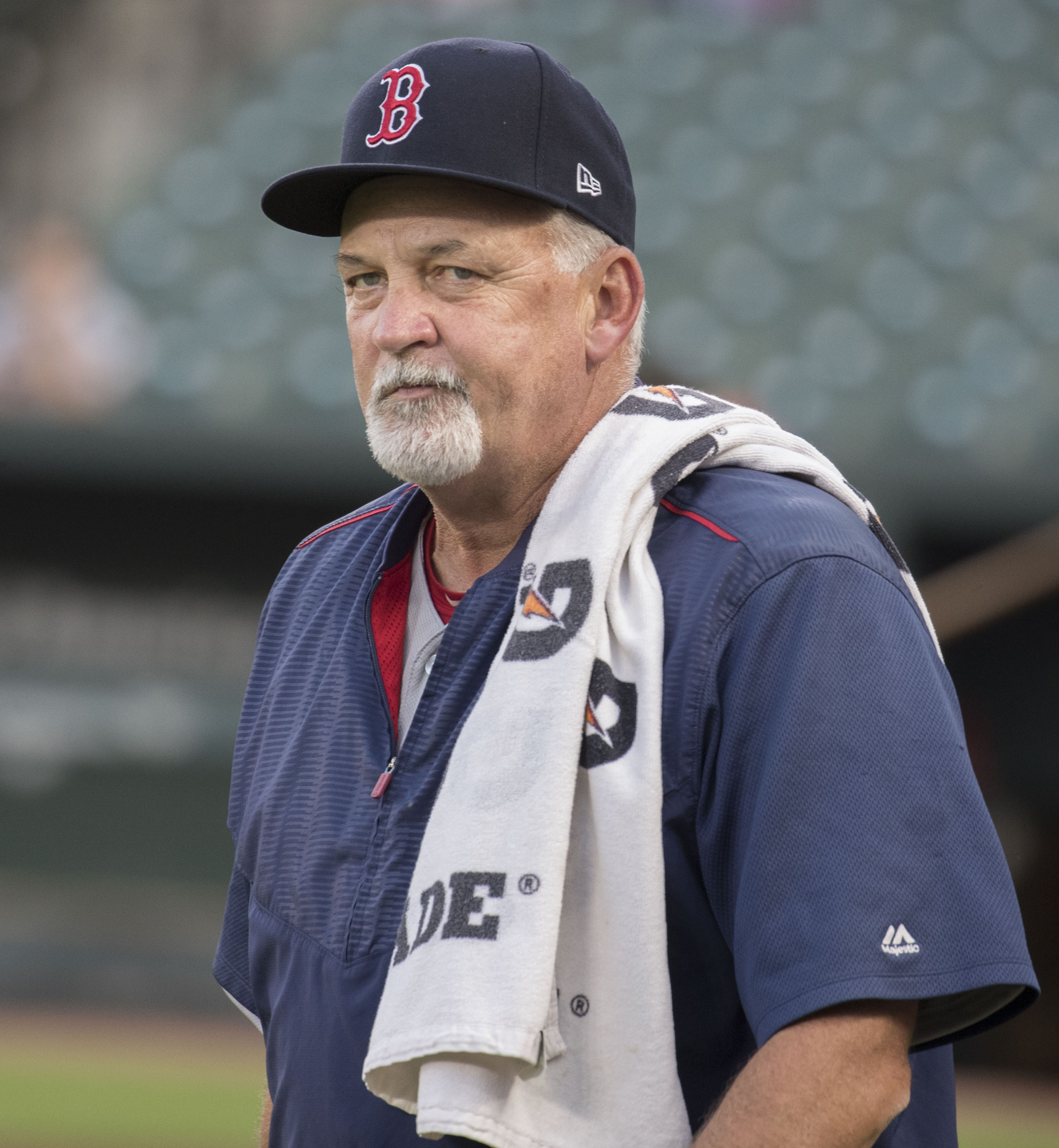
- Willis with the Boston Red Sox in 2017

Cleveland Guardians – No. 51
- Pitcher / Pitching coach
- Born: December 28, 1960 (age 65); Danville, Virginia, U.S.
- Batted: Left Threw: Right

MLB debut
- June 9, 1984, for the Detroit Tigers

Last MLB appearance
- May 3, 1995, for the Minnesota Twins

MLB statistics
- Win–loss record: 22–16
- Earned run average: 4.25
- Strikeouts: 222
- Stats at Baseball Reference

Teams
- As player: Detroit Tigers (1984); Cincinnati Reds (1984–1986); Chicago White Sox (1988); Minnesota Twins (1991–1995); As coach: Cleveland Indians (2003–2009); Seattle Mariners (2010–2013); Boston Red Sox (2015–2017); Cleveland Indians / Guardians (2018–present)

Career highlights and awards
- World Series champion (1991)

Carl Blake Willis (born December 28, 1960) is an American former professional baseball pitcher and current pitching coach for the Cleveland Guardians of Major League Baseball (MLB). He was previously the pitching coach for the Boston Red Sox and the Seattle Mariners.

Willis played for nine seasons in the majors as a relief pitcher for the Detroit Tigers, Cincinnati Reds, Chicago White Sox and Minnesota Twins (with whom he won the 1991 World Series). He is best known as a pitching coach for five Cy Young winners, the second most in MLB history.

== Playing career ==
Willis was born on December 28, 1960, in Danville, Virginia. He grew up in Yanceyville, North Carolina. After high school, he attended the University of North Carolina at Wilmington. He was originally drafted by the San Francisco Giants in the 31st round (764th overall) of the 1982 Major League Baseball draft, but did not sign. A year later, Willis was selected by the Detroit Tigers in the 23rd round (581st overall) of the 1983 Major League Baseball draft, and he signed with the team.

Willis made his major league debut with the Tigers on June 9, 1984, against the Baltimore Orioles, tossing 2 1/3 scoreless innings in a 4–0 loss. He made 10 appearances (two starts) with Detroit, going 0–2 with a 7.31 ERA. On September 1, Willis was acquired by the Cincinnati Reds to complete an earlier trade for relief pitcher Bill Scherrer. He went 0–1 with a save and a 3.72 ERA in seven relief appearances to close the season. Willis spent the next three seasons splitting time between the Reds and their minor league system. On December 10, 1985, Willis was selected by the California Angels in the Rule 5 draft, but he was returned to the Reds on April 6, 1986.

On December 6, 1988, Willis was acquired by the Chicago White Sox. After splitting time between the White Sox and Cleveland Indians organizations, he was signed by the Minnesota Twins on December 12, 1990. In 1991, Willis began a career turnaround, going 8–3 with two saves and a 2.63 ERA in 40 relief appearances. The next season, he posted the best season of his career, finishing with a 7–3 record, one save, and a 2.72 ERA in 59 relief appearances.

Willis continued to pitch for the Twins until May 4, 1995, when he was released after a disastrous start to the season. He signed with the Angels on June 27, and pitched the remainder of the season in Triple-A before retiring.

As a major leaguer, Willis was a member of one World Series championship team: the Twins in the 1991 World Series. In nine seasons, he had a 22–16 win–loss record, 81 games finished, 13 saves, 390 innings pitched, 424 hits allowed, 210 runs allowed, 184 earned runs allowed, 28 home runs allowed, 115 walks allowed, 222 strikeouts, two hit batsmen, 20 wild pitches, 1,668 batters faced, 25 intentional walks, three balks and a 4.25 ERA in 267 games (two starts). He also posted a 1.9 career WAR according to Baseball Reference.

== Coaching career ==
Willis began his coaching career in 1997 as the pitching coach for the Rookie-level Watertown Indians. In 2001, Willis hired as the pitching coach for the Buffalo Bisons, Cleveland's Triple-A affiliate. He spent two seasons in Buffalo before being hired in the same role for the Indians on March 19, 2003. In 2005, Cleveland posted the best ERA in baseball (3.61) for the first time since 1996. In 2007, the Indians' starting rotation compiled the lowest ERA in the American League (4.19), and their entire staff allowed 410 walks, the fewest allowed by the team in a full season since 1920. On September 30, 2009, it was announced that Willis would not be retained for the 2010 season.

On November 30, 2009, Willis was named the Seattle Mariners minor-league pitching coordinator. On August 9, 2010, Willis was promoted to the Seattle Mariners coaching staff as the new pitching coach, replacing Rick Adair, who was fired along with manager Don Wakamatsu and bench coach Ty Van Burkleo. Willis was fired by the Mariners on November 22, 2013.

In 2015, Willis was named to be the pitching coach for the Columbus Clippers, marking a return to the Cleveland Indians organization. On May 9, 2015, Willis was named as the pitching coach for the Boston Red Sox, replacing Juan Nieves.

On October 26, 2017, Willis was re-hired by the Indians as pitching coach, replacing Mickey Callaway.

Willis has had five pitchers win Cy Young Awards during his time as their pitching coach: CC Sabathia in 2007, Cliff Lee in 2008, Félix Hernández in 2010, Rick Porcello in 2016, and Shane Bieber in 2020.

In May 2022, Willis assumed managerial duties for a few games after a COVID-19 outbreak within the team sidelined multiple coaches, including manager Terry Francona.

| Preceded by Mike Brown; Mickey Callaway | Cleveland Indians pitching coach 2003–2009; 2018–present | Succeeded by Tim Belcher incumbent |
| Preceded by Rick Adair | Seattle Mariners pitching coach 2010–2013 | Succeeded by Rick Waits |
| Preceded by Juan Nieves | Boston Red Sox pitching coach 2015–2017 | Succeeded by Dana LeVangie |
