= José Guzmán =

Puerto Rican baseball player (born 1963)

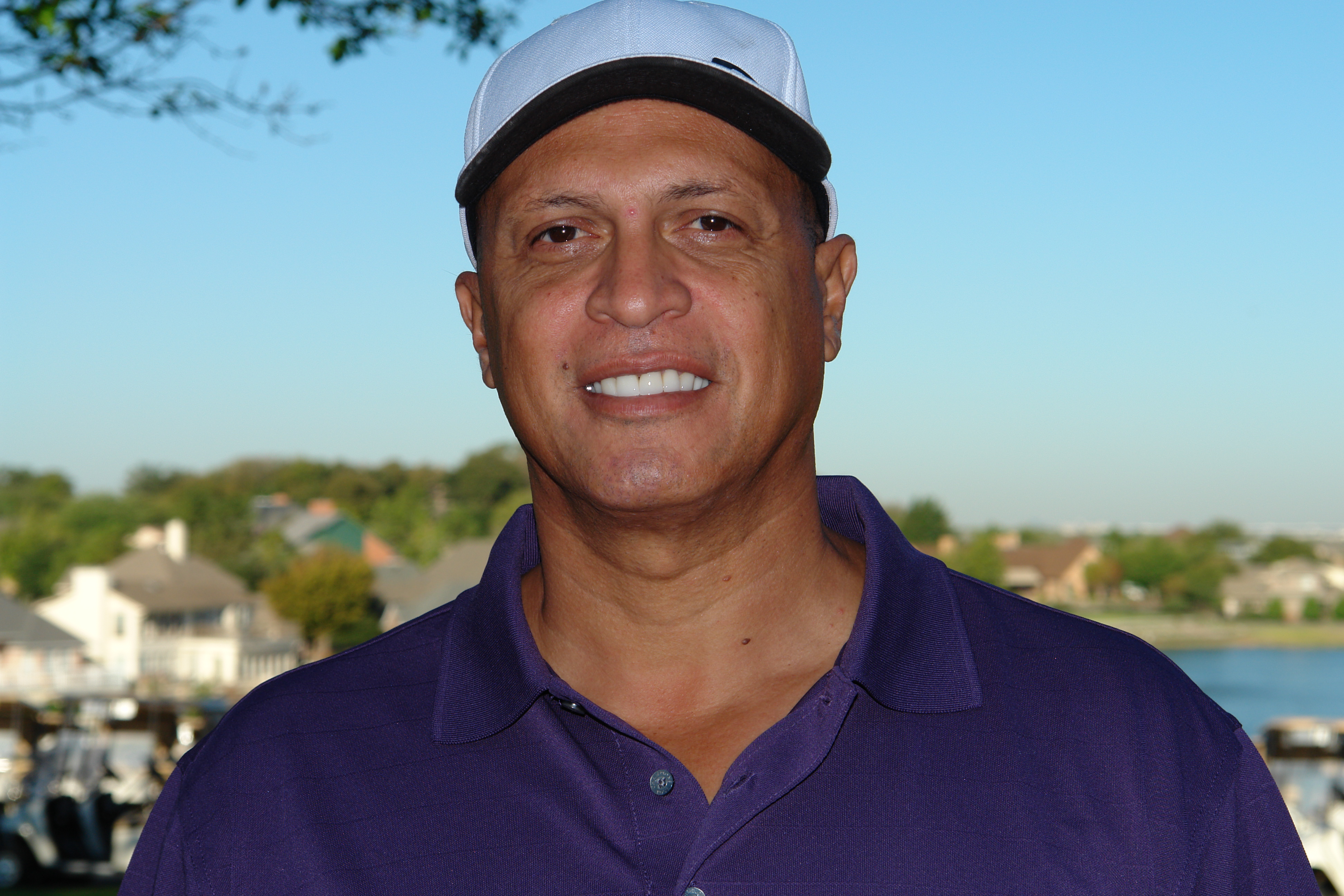
- Guzmán in 2011
- Pitcher
- Born: April 9, 1963 (age 63); Santa Isabel, Puerto Rico
- Batted: Right Threw: Right

MLB debut
- September 10, 1985, for the Texas Rangers

Last MLB appearance
- May 23, 1994, for the Chicago Cubs

MLB statistics
- Win–loss record: 80–74
- Earned run average: 4.05
- Strikeouts: 889
- Stats at Baseball Reference

Teams
- Texas Rangers (1985–1988, 1991–1992); Chicago Cubs (1993–1994)

José Alberto Guzmán Mirabal (born April 9, 1963) is a Puerto Rican former professional baseball pitcher. He played in Major League Baseball (MLB) for the Texas Rangers and Chicago Cubs from 1985 to 1994.

== Career ==
Guzmán was signed by the Texas Rangers as an amateur free agent on February 10, 1981. He made his major league debut on September 10, 1985, against the Oakland Athletics. He remained with the Rangers for six seasons, winning the 1991 MLB Comeback Player of the Year Award after improving from an 11–13 season to 13–7 in 1991.

In December, 1992, Guzmán signed as a free agent with the Chicago Cubs. On April 6, 1993, in defeating the Atlanta Braves 1–0 at Wrigley Field, Guzmán had a no-hitter broken up by an Otis Nixon single with two out in the ninth—the only hit he would allow. The no-hitter would have been the first pitched by a Cub (and, in fact, the first the Cubs had been involved in) since Milt Pappas in 1972.

He remained with the Cubs for one more season pitching his final game on May 23, 1994. He was under contract through 1996, but injuries prevented him for making a comeback.

Since 2004, Guzmán has worked as a Spanish language radio broadcaster for the Rangers. He also holds a charity golf tournament for Alzheimer patients each October.

== See also ==
- List of Texas Rangers Opening Day starting pitchers
