= Chris Beasley (baseball) =

American baseball player (born 1962)

- Pitcher
- Born: June 23, 1962 (age 64); Jackson, Tennessee, U.S.
- Batted: Right Threw: Right

MLB debut
- July 20, 1991, for the California Angels

Last MLB appearance
- September 29, 1991, for the California Angels

MLB statistics
- Win–loss record: 0–1
- Earned run average: 3.38
- Strikeouts: 14
- Stats at Baseball Reference

Teams
- California Angels (1991)

Christopher Charles Beasley (born June 23, 1962) is an American former middle relief pitcher in Major League Baseball (MLB) who played briefly for the California Angels during the 1991 season. Listed at 6 ft 2 in (1.88 m), 190 lb., Beasley batted and threw right-handed. He attended Arizona State University.

== Draft ==
Beasley was drafted three times. He was originally drafted by the Chicago White Sox in the 6th round of the 1982 January draft, however he didn't sign. He then was selected by the Angels in the 27th round of the regular draft in 1983, and again did not sign. He finally signed with the Cleveland Indians after being drafted by them in the ninth round of the 1984 draft.

A star pitcher for the ASU Sun Devils, Beasley played in the 1983 and 1984 College World Series.

== Professional career ==
In the minor leagues, Beasley was mostly used as a starting pitcher.

He began his professional career in 1984, pitching for the Batavia Trojans. He went 6–5 with a 4.01 ERA for them. In 1985, he pitched for the Waterloo Indians and Waterbury Indians, going a combined 8–13 with a 3.58 ERA. He went 8–9 with a 3.82 ERA in 1986.

In 1987, he began the season with the Williamsport Bills, however he was released by the Indians on June 15. On June 30, he was signed by the Seattle Mariners and finished the season with their minor league team, the Chattanooga Lookouts. He went a combined 4–10 with a 5.28 ERA in 1987.

On March 23, 1988, the Mariners released Beasley. He did not pitch in 1988. However, on February 10, 1989, he was signed by the Angels. He pitched for the Palm Springs Angels and Midland Angels in 1989, going a combined 12–7 with a 3.39 ERA. He pitched for the Edmonton Trappers in 1990, going 12–9 with a 4.49 ERA.

In 1991, Beasley spent about half the season in the minors and half in the majors. He went 3–5 with a 5.26 ERA for the Trappers in the minors. On July 20, he made his big league debut, pitching against his former team, the Cleveland Indians. He worked one inning in his big league debut, allowing a walk and no earned runs. He recorded his first career strikeout in that game as well. Overall, Beasley went 0–1 with a 3.38 ERA in 22 big league games that season, giving up 10 earned runs on 26 hits and 10 walks while striking out 14 in 26 2/3 innings of work. He played his final game on September 29.

He played his final professional season in 1992, with the Edmonton Trappers. He went 2–1 with a 4.09 ERA with them.

Overall, he went 55–59 with a 4.15 ERA in his minor league career.
