= David West (baseball) =

American baseball player (1964–2022)

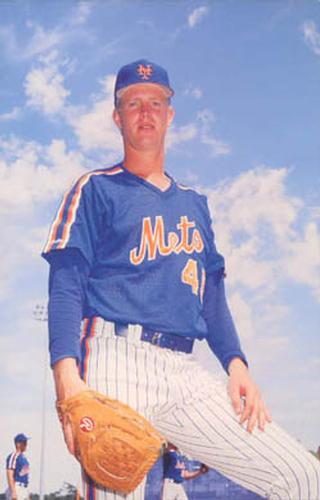
- West with the New York Mets in 1988
- Pitcher
- Born: September 1, 1964; Memphis, Tennessee, U.S.
- Died: May 14, 2022 (aged 57); Memphis, Tennessee, U.S.
- Batted: Left Threw: Left

Professional debut
- MLB: September 24, 1988, for the New York Mets
- NPB: April 8, 1997, for the Fukuoka Daiei Hawks

Last appearance
- NPB: August 9, 1997, for the Fukuoka Daiei Hawks
- MLB: September 4, 1998, for the Boston Red Sox

MLB statistics
- Win–loss record: 31–38
- Earned run average: 4.66
- Strikeouts: 437

NPB statistics
- Win–loss record: 8–5
- Earned run average: 6.38
- Strikeouts: 63
- Stats at Baseball Reference

Teams
- New York Mets (1988–1989); Minnesota Twins (1989–1992); Philadelphia Phillies (1993–1996); Fukuoka Daiei Hawks (1997); Boston Red Sox (1998)

Career highlights and awards
- World Series champion (1991)

David Lee West (September 1, 1964 – May 14, 2022) was an American professional baseball pitcher who played ten seasons in Major League Baseball (MLB). He played for the New York Mets, Minnesota Twins, Philadelphia Phillies, and Boston Red Sox from 1988 to 1998. He also played one season in Nippon Professional Baseball for the Fukuoka Daiei Hawks in 1997.

== Early life ==
West was born in Memphis, Tennessee, on September 1, 1964. He attended Craigmont High School in his hometown, where he pitched for the school's baseball team. After his graduation in 1983, the New York Mets selected him in the fourth round of the 1983 MLB draft.

== Professional career ==
West played six seasons in the minor leagues from 1983 to 1988, and was regarded as the Mets' premier pitching prospect. He made his MLB debut for the franchise on September 24, 1988, at the age of 24, pitching five innings, striking out three, and being the winning pitcher in a 14–1 victory over the St. Louis Cardinals. After posting a 7.40 earned run average (ERA) in 21 games pitched (7 starts) midway through his 1989 rookie season, he was traded to the Minnesota Twins with Rick Aguilera, Tim Drummond, and Kevin Tapani for Frank Viola on July 31 that year.

West compiled a 7–9 win–loss record along with a 5.10 ERA and 92 strikeouts over a career-high 146 1/3 innings in 1990, which ended with a hamstring injury. During spring training the following season, he injured his elbow before straining his abdominal muscles immediately ahead of his intended comeback. This consequently delayed his first start of the 1991 season to July 4. He was utilized mostly as a relief pitcher towards the end of the regular season. In the 1991 American League Championship Series, he appeared in two games against the Toronto Blue Jays, pitching 5 2/3 innings while allowing just one hit and no runs and being the winning pitcher in Game 5. He then appeared in two games during the World Series that year but recorded no outs, allowing two hits, four runs, four walks in six total batters, resulting in an infinite ERA. The Twins ultimately won the championship in seven games.

During the 1992 season, West was limited to 9 games (3 starts) and had a 1–3 record with a 6.99 ERA in 28 1/3 innings pitched. He was traded at the end of the year to the Philadelphia Phillies in exchange for Mike Hartley. He was used exclusively in relief in 1993, recording a career-best 2.92 ERA that year and finishing second in the National League (NL) in games pitched (76). The 76 games he pitched in set a Phillies record for a lefty. He went on to pitch three games in the 1993 World Series, which the Phillies lost to the Toronto Blue Jays. In the 1994 season, West finished fourth in the NL in walks (61) and wild pitches (9), and seventh in losses (10). He missed the majority of the 1996 season due to injury, before moving to Japan the following year to pitch for the Fukuoka Daiei Hawks. He returned to MLB in 1998, pitching six games for the Boston Red Sox and playing his final major league game on September 4 that year, at the age of 34.

== Personal life ==
West died on May 14, 2022. He was 57, and suffered from brain cancer prior to his death. He was the sixth former Phillies player to die of brain cancer since 2003, after Ken Brett, Tug McGraw, Johnny Oates, John Vukovich, and Darren Daulton. A moment of silence was put in place during the game between the Phillies and the Padres on May 17, 2022.
