= Gerald Alexander (baseball) =

American baseball player (born 1968)

- Pitcher
- Born: March 26, 1968 (age 58); Baton Rouge, Louisiana, U.S.
- Batted: Right Threw: Right

MLB debut
- September 9, 1990, for the Texas Rangers

Last MLB appearance
- June 30, 1992, for the Texas Rangers

MLB statistics
- Win–loss record: 6–3
- Earned run average: 5.79
- Strikeouts: 59
- Stats at Baseball Reference

Teams
- Texas Rangers (1990–1992)

Gerald Paul Alexander (born March 26, 1968) is an American former Major League Baseball pitcher. He played for the Texas Rangers from 1990 to 1992.
