= 1991 Major League Baseball season =

1991 MLB season
- League: Major League Baseball
- Sport: Baseball
- Duration: April 8 – October 27, 1991
- Games: 162
- Teams: 26
- TV partner(s): CBS; ESPN

Draft
- Top draft pick: Brien Taylor
- Picked by: New York Yankees

Regular Season
- Season MVP: AL: Cal Ripken Jr. (BAL); NL: Terry Pendleton (ATL)

Postseason
- AL champions: Minnesota Twins
- AL runners-up: Toronto Blue Jays
- NL champions: Atlanta Braves
- NL runners-up: Pittsburgh Pirates

World Series
- Champions: Minnesota Twins
- Runners-up: Atlanta Braves
- World Series MVP: Jack Morris (MIN)

MLB seasons
- ← 1990 1992 →

Locations of teams for the 1991 American League season
West East
Locations of teams for the 1977–1992 National League seasons
West East

The 1991 Major League Baseball season saw the Minnesota Twins defeat the Atlanta Braves for the World Series title, in a series where every game was won by the home team.

The Twins and Braves became the first two teams in MLB history to win the pennant after finishing last the previous season.

== Awards and honors ==
- Baseball Hall of Fame
  - Rod Carew
  - Ferguson Jenkins
  - Tony Lazzeri
  - Gaylord Perry
  - Bill Veeck

Baseball Writers' Association of America Awards
BBWAA Award	National League	American League
Rookie of the Year	Jeff Bagwell (HOU)	Chuck Knoblauch (MIN)
Cy Young Award	Tom Glavine (ATL)	Roger Clemens (BOS)
Manager of the Year	Bobby Cox (ATL)	Tom Kelly (MIN)
Most Valuable Player	Terry Pendleton (ATL)	Cal Ripken Jr. (BAL)
Gold Glove Awards
Position	National League	American League
Pitcher	Greg Maddux (CHC)	Mark Langston (CAL)
Catcher	Tom Pagnozzi (STL)	Tony Peña (BOS)
First Baseman	Will Clark (SF)	Don Mattingly (NYY)
Second Baseman	Ryne Sandberg (CHC)	Roberto Alomar (TOR)
Third Baseman	Matt Williams (SF)	Robin Ventura (CWS)
Shortstop	Ozzie Smith (STL)	Cal Ripken Jr. (BAL)
Outfielders	Barry Bonds (PIT)	Kirby Puckett (MIN)
Outfielders	Tony Gwynn (SD)	Devon White (TOR)
Outfielders	Andy Van Slyke (PIT)	Ken Griffey Jr. (SEA)
Silver Slugger Awards
Pitcher/Designated Hitter	Tom Glavine (ATL)	Frank Thomas (CWS)
Catcher	Benito Santiago (SD)	Mickey Tettleton (DET)
First Baseman	Will Clark (SF)	Cecil Fielder (DET)
Second Baseman	Ryne Sandberg (CHC)	Julio Franco (TEX)
Third Baseman	Howard Johnson (NYM)	Wade Boggs (BOS)
Shortstop	Barry Larkin (CIN)	Cal Ripken Jr. (BAL)
Outfielders	Barry Bonds (PIT)	Joe Carter (TOR)
Outfielders	Bobby Bonilla (PIT)	Ken Griffey Jr. (SEA)
Outfielders	Ron Gant (ATL)	Jose Canseco (OAK)

=== Other awards ===
- Outstanding Designated Hitter Award: Chili Davis (MIN)
- Roberto Clemente Award (Humanitarian): Harold Reynolds (SEA)
- Rolaids Relief Man Award: Bryan Harvey (CAL, American); Lee Smith (STL, National)

=== Player of the Month ===
Month	American League	National League
April	Dave Henderson	Félix José
May	Rubén Sierra	David Justice
June	Joe Carter	Barry Larkin
July	Robin Ventura	Barry Bonds
August	Frank Thomas	Will Clark
September	Cal Ripken Jr.	Howard Johnson

=== Pitcher of the Month ===
Month	American League	National League
April	Roger Clemens	Lee Smith
May	Scott Erickson	Tom Glavine
June	Jack Morris	Rob Dibble
July	Bill Krueger	Dennis Martínez
August	Kevin Tapani	Mitch Williams
September	Roger Clemens	Chris Nabholz

== Statistical leaders ==
Statistic	American League		National League	
AVG	Julio Franco TEX	.341	Terry Pendleton ATL	.319
HR	José Canseco OAK; Cecil Fielder DET	44	Howard Johnson NYM	38
RBI	Cecil Fielder DET	133	Howard Johnson NYM	117
Wins	Scott Erickson MIN; Bill Gullickson DET	20	Tom Glavine ATL; John Smiley PIT	20
ERA	Roger Clemens BOS	2.62	Dennis Martínez MON	2.39
SO	Roger Clemens BOS	241	David Cone NYM	241
SV	Bryan Harvey CAL	46	Lee Smith STL	47
SB	Rickey Henderson OAK	58	Marquis Grissom MON	76

== Standings ==
=== American League ===
AL East
Team	W	L	Pct.	GB	Home	Road
Toronto Blue Jays	91	71	.562	—	46‍–‍35	45‍–‍36
Boston Red Sox	84	78	.519	7	43‍–‍38	41‍–‍40
Detroit Tigers	84	78	.519	7	49‍–‍32	35‍–‍46
Milwaukee Brewers	83	79	.512	8	43‍–‍37	40‍–‍42
New York Yankees	71	91	.438	20	39‍–‍42	32‍–‍49
Baltimore Orioles	67	95	.414	24	33‍–‍48	34‍–‍47
Cleveland Indians	57	105	.352	34	30‍–‍52	27‍–‍53

AL West
Team	W	L	Pct.	GB	Home	Road
Minnesota Twins	95	67	.586	—	51‍–‍30	44‍–‍37
Chicago White Sox	87	75	.537	8	46‍–‍35	41‍–‍40
Texas Rangers	85	77	.525	10	46‍–‍35	39‍–‍42
Oakland Athletics	84	78	.519	11	47‍–‍34	37‍–‍44
Seattle Mariners	83	79	.512	12	45‍–‍36	38‍–‍43
Kansas City Royals	82	80	.506	13	40‍–‍41	42‍–‍39
California Angels	81	81	.500	14	40‍–‍41	41‍–‍40

=== National League ===
NL East
Team	W	L	Pct.	GB	Home	Road
Pittsburgh Pirates	98	64	.605	—	52‍–‍32	46‍–‍32
St. Louis Cardinals	84	78	.519	14	52‍–‍32	32‍–‍46
Philadelphia Phillies	78	84	.481	20	47‍–‍36	31‍–‍48
Chicago Cubs	77	83	.481	20	46‍–‍37	31‍–‍46
New York Mets	77	84	.478	20½	40‍–‍42	37‍–‍42
Montreal Expos	71	90	.441	26½	33‍–‍35	38‍–‍55

NL West
Team	W	L	Pct.	GB	Home	Road
Atlanta Braves	94	68	.580	—	48‍–‍33	46‍–‍35
Los Angeles Dodgers	93	69	.574	1	54‍–‍27	39‍–‍42
San Diego Padres	84	78	.519	10	42‍–‍39	42‍–‍39
San Francisco Giants	75	87	.463	19	43‍–‍38	32‍–‍49
Cincinnati Reds	74	88	.457	20	39‍–‍42	35‍–‍46
Houston Astros	65	97	.401	29	37‍–‍44	28‍–‍53

== Postseason ==
=== Bracket ===
League Championship Series (ALCS, NLCS)
East	Toronto	1
West	Minnesota	4
East	Pittsburgh	3
West	Atlanta	4

World Series
AL	Minnesota	4
NL	Atlanta	3

== Managers ==
=== American League ===
Team	Manager	Comments
Baltimore Orioles	Frank Robinson	Replaced during the season by Johnny Oates
Boston Red Sox	Joe Morgan	
California Angels	Doug Rader	Replaced during the season by Buck Rodgers
Chicago White Sox	Jeff Torborg	
Cleveland Indians	John McNamara	Replaced during the season by Mike Hargrove
Detroit Tigers	Sparky Anderson	13th season with the club
Kansas City Royals	John Wathan	Replaced during the season by Hal McRae
Milwaukee Brewers	Tom Trebelhorn	
Minnesota Twins	Tom Kelly	Won the World Series
New York Yankees	Stump Merrill	
Oakland Athletics	Tony La Russa	
Seattle Mariners	Jim Lefebvre	
Texas Rangers	Bobby Valentine	
Toronto Blue Jays	Cito Gaston	Replaced temporarily by Gene Tenace while undergoing treatment for a herniated disc. Won AL East

=== National League ===
Team	Manager	Comments
Atlanta Braves	Bobby Cox	Won National League pennant
Chicago Cubs	Don Zimmer	Replaced during the season by Jim Essian
Cincinnati Reds	Lou Piniella	
Houston Astros	Art Howe	
Los Angeles Dodgers	Tommy Lasorda	
Montreal Expos	Buck Rodgers	Replaced during the season by Tom Runnells
New York Mets	Bud Harrelson	Replaced during the season by Mike Cubbage
Philadelphia Phillies	Nick Leyva	Replaced during the season by Jim Fregosi
Pittsburgh Pirates	Jim Leyland	Won NL East
St. Louis Cardinals	Joe Torre	
San Diego Padres	Greg Riddoch	
San Francisco Giants	Roger Craig	

== Home field attendance and payroll ==
Team name	Wins	%±	Home attendance	%±	Per game	Est. payroll	%±
Toronto Blue Jays	91	5.8%	4,001,527	3.0%	49,402	$19,902,417	3.3%
Los Angeles Dodgers	93	8.1%	3,348,170	11.5%	41,335	$32,790,664	48.9%
Chicago White Sox	87	−7.4%	2,934,154	46.5%	36,224	$16,919,667	57.8%
Oakland Athletics	84	−18.4%	2,713,493	−6.4%	33,500	$36,999,167	84.2%
Boston Red Sox	84	−4.5%	2,562,435	1.3%	31,635	$35,167,500	68.6%
Baltimore Orioles	67	−11.8%	2,552,753	5.7%	31,515	$17,519,000	73.5%
St. Louis Cardinals	84	20.0%	2,448,699	−4.8%	29,151	$21,860,001	3.9%
California Angels	81	1.3%	2,416,236	−5.5%	29,830	$33,060,001	47.5%
Cincinnati Reds	74	−18.7%	2,372,377	−1.2%	29,289	$26,305,333	81.8%
Chicago Cubs	77	0.0%	2,314,250	3.1%	27,883	$23,380,667	60.2%
Texas Rangers	85	2.4%	2,297,720	11.7%	28,367	$18,224,500	16.8%
Minnesota Twins	95	28.4%	2,293,842	31.0%	28,319	$23,361,833	53.0%
New York Mets	77	−15.4%	2,284,484	−16.4%	27,860	$32,590,001	48.7%
Kansas City Royals	82	9.3%	2,161,537	−3.7%	26,686	$26,319,834	8.9%
Seattle Mariners	83	7.8%	2,147,905	42.3%	26,517	$15,691,833	21.9%
Atlanta Braves	94	44.6%	2,140,217	118.4%	26,422	$18,403,500	22.2%
Pittsburgh Pirates	98	3.2%	2,065,302	0.8%	24,587	$23,634,667	51.9%
Philadelphia Phillies	78	1.3%	2,050,012	2.9%	24,699	$22,487,332	63.7%
New York Yankees	71	6.0%	1,863,733	−7.1%	23,009	$27,344,168	28.3%
San Diego Padres	84	12.0%	1,804,289	−2.8%	22,275	$22,150,001	24.5%
San Francisco Giants	75	−11.8%	1,737,478	−12.0%	21,450	$30,967,666	43.6%
Detroit Tigers	84	6.3%	1,641,661	9.8%	20,267	$23,838,333	29.6%
Milwaukee Brewers	83	12.2%	1,478,729	−15.6%	18,484	$23,115,500	14.7%
Houston Astros	65	−13.3%	1,196,152	−8.8%	14,767	$12,852,500	−31.5%
Cleveland Indians	57	−26.0%	1,051,863	−14.2%	12,828	$17,635,000	16.0%
Montreal Expos	71	−16.5%	934,742	−31.9%	13,746	$10,732,333	−38.1%

== Television coverage ==
Network	Day of week	Announcers
CBS	Saturday afternoons	Jack Buck, Tim McCarver, Dick Stockton, Jim Kaat
ESPN	Sunday nights Tuesday nights Wednesday nights Friday nights	Jon Miller, Joe Morgan See also: List of ESPN Major League Baseball broadcasters

== Events ==
=== January–March ===
- January 6 – Alan Wiggins, former leadoff hitter for the San Diego Padres and a key member of their 1984 pennant run, becomes the first baseball player known to die of AIDS. He was 32.
- January 7 – Pete Rose is released from Marion Federal Prison after serving a five-month sentence for tax evasion.
- January 8 – Rod Carew, Gaylord Perry and Ferguson Jenkins are elected to the Hall of Fame by the Baseball Writers' Association of America, with Carew becoming the 22nd player to be named in his first year of eligibility.
- February 4 – The 12 members of the board of directors of the Hall of Fame vote unanimously to bar Pete Rose from the ballot.
- February 26 – New York Yankees second baseman Tony Lazzeri and major league owner Bill Veeck are elected to the Hall of Fame by the Veterans Committee.

=== April–June ===
- April – MLB requires that all teams wear American and Canadian flag decals on their batting helmets in honor of those who served in Operation Desert Storm.
- April 8 – Just hours before the first pitch of the baseball season, MLB averts an umpires strike by reaching agreement with the Major League Umpires' Association on a new four-year contract.
- April 18 – The new Comiskey Park opens across the street from where the original stood in Chicago. A sold-out stadium sees the Detroit Tigers defeat the Chicago White Sox, 16–0.
- April 21 – The Chicago Cubs score five runs in the top of the eleventh inning, but the Pittsburgh Pirates comeback with six runs in the bottom of the inning for the victory; the greatest extra-innings comeback (in terms of runs) in Major League history.
- April 23 – Nick Leyva is fired as manager of the Philadelphia Phillies, becoming the first manager fired in 1991.
- May 1 – Nolan Ryan of the Texas Rangers records his seventh no-hitter, striking out Roberto Alomar for the final out in a 3–0 victory over the Toronto Blue Jays.
- May 1 – Rickey Henderson of the Oakland Athletics records his 939th stolen base, eclipsing Lou Brock's all-time record.
- May 21 – Don Zimmer is fired as manager of the Chicago Cubs and replaced by Jim Essian. Zimmer is the second manager fired during the 1991 season.
- May 22 – John Wathan is fired as manager of the Kansas City Royals and replaced by Hal McRae. Wathan is the third manager fired in less than one month.
- May 23 – By stealing second base from pitcher Ron Darling and catcher Rick Cerone of the New York Mets, Andre Dawson of the Chicago Cubs becomes the third player in baseball history to record 300 home runs and 300 stolen bases. As of this date, the only other members of the 300–300 club are Bobby Bonds and Willie Mays. On the same day, Philadelphia Phillies pitcher Tommy Greene throws a no-hitter, and the Baltimore Orioles fire Frank Robinson and replace him with Johnny Oates. Robinson is the fourth manager fired on the season, and the third fired in three days.
- June 3 – Buck Rodgers becomes the fifth managerial casualty of the season, and the third in the National League East. Tom Runnels replaces Rodgers as the new Montreal Expos manager.
- June 10 – The National League votes to choose Miami, Florida, and Denver, Colorado, to form baseball teams for the 1993 season. They beat out Orlando, Florida, St. Petersburg, Florida, Washington, D.C., and Buffalo, New York. The Miami franchise was awarded to Blockbuster Video CEO H. Wayne Huizenga, while the Denver franchise was awarded to Ohio beverage distributor John Antonucci and Phar-Mor CEO Michael I. Monus.
- June 16 – The Cincinnati Reds and Philadelphia Phillies wear 1957 uniforms in a Nostalgia Day game at Veterans Stadium.

=== July–September ===
- July 6 – The National League publicly announces its two expansion franchises for 1993: the Colorado Rockies and the Florida Marlins (based in Denver and Miami, respectively).
- July 6 – John McNamara, winner of the 1979 National League West division with the Cincinnati Reds and 1986 American League pennant with the Boston Red Sox, is fired as manager of the Cleveland Indians. He is replaced by Mike Hargrove. The firing is the sixth on the season and occurs just as the first half of the season ends.
- July 7 – Outside a restaurant in Arlington, Texas, American League umpire Steve Palermo is shot and paralyzed from the waist down after aiding a woman who was being mugged. The assailant is later sentenced to 75 years in prison.
- July 9 – Cal Ripken Jr.'s three-run home run lifts the American League to a 4–2 win over the National League in the annual All-Star Game, held at the SkyDome in Toronto. Andre Dawson homers for the NL, who lose for the fourth straight year. Ripken Jr., who also won the pre-game Home Run Derby, is named the game's MVP.
- July 13 – The Baltimore Orioles throw the second four-man no-hitter in baseball history, as Bob Milacki, Mike Flanagan, Mark Williamson, and Gregg Olson combine for a 2–0 win against the Oakland Athletics. On September 28, 1975, four Oakland Athletics pitchers (Vida Blue, Glenn Abbott, Paul Lindblad, and Rollie Fingers) tossed a combined no-hitter against the California Angels.
- July 26 – Montreal Expos pitcher Mark Gardner throws a no-hitter through nine innings, but does not complete it when his team fails to score against Los Angeles Dodgers starter Orel Hershiser and reliever Kip Gross. Gardner loses the no-hitter and the game in the tenth inning when the Dodgers get three hits and score the only run of the game. The Expos only get two hits.
- July 28 – Picking up where Mark Gardner left off, Montreal Expos hurler Dennis Martínez throws a perfect game against the Los Angeles Dodgers. The Expos only get four hits, but they score two runs and give Martínez the thirteenth perfect game in major league history. Ron Hassey, Martínez's catcher, becomes the first player to catch two perfect games, having also caught Len Barker's in 1981.
- July 31 – Two-sport star Deion Sanders of the Atlanta Braves, playing in his final game of the season with the Braves before having to report to the Atlanta Falcons' training camp, hits a three-run homer to spark a come-from-behind 8-6 win over the Pittsburgh Pirates.
- August 11 – In only his second Major League game, and first Major League start, Wilson Álvarez throws a no-hitter as the Chicago White Sox beat the Baltimore Orioles, 7–0. It is the fifth no-hitter of the 1991 season, not including Mark Gardner's nine inning no-hitter that was lost in the tenth on July 26.
- August 14 – California Angels DH Dave Winfield hits his 400th career home run against the Minnesota Twins. Winfield is the 23rd player in major league history to accomplish the feat.
- August 26 – The sixth no-hitter of 1991 is thrown by two-time Cy Young Award winner Bret Saberhagen. The Kansas City Royals pitcher no-hits the Chicago White Sox, 7–0, for his first career no-hitter. On the same day, the seventh managerial firing of 1991 occurs as the California Angels, who have gone from first to last in less than one month, fire Doug Rader and replace him with the recently deposed Buck Rodgers.
- September 4 – Removing an "asterisk" which was never universally recognized, the Statistical Accuracy Committee decides to put Roger Maris' 61 home run season of 1961 ahead of Babe Ruth's 60 mark of 1927. Regarding the expunging of the asterisk, historian Bill Deane later points out, "It was an easy job: the asterisk never existed. Maris' record was, from 1962 until 1991, listed separately from Ruth's and was never actually defined by 'some distinctive mark.'" The eight-man panel also re-defines a no-hit game as one which ends after nine or more innings with one team failing to get a hit, thereby removing 50 games from the list that had previously been considered hitless, including the 1959 performance of St. Louis Cardinals' Harvey Haddix, who pitched 12 perfect innings against the Milwaukee Braves, and Cincinnati Reds' Jim Maloney 1965 1–0 loss to the New York Mets in 11 innings. Another casualty is Boston Red Sox reliever Ernie Shore 27 straight outs on June 23, 1917, a game in which he relieved Babe Ruth after being ejected for protesting a walk to Ray Morgan, the first Washington Senators batter he faced. Morgan was thrown out trying to steal second, and Shore retired all 26 men he faces in a 4–0 win‚ getting credit in the books for a perfect game.
- September 11 – The Atlanta Braves, on the verge of a pennant, throw a three-man no-hitter at Atlanta–Fulton County Stadium against the San Diego Padres. Kent Mercker, Mark Wohlers, and Alejandro Peña combine to no-hit the San Diego Padres, the seventh no-hitter of 1991. Controversy ensues when Tony Gwynn apparently ends the no-hitter with two outs in the ninth inning but the official scorer rules it an error on Terry Pendleton.
- September 13 – A piece of concrete weighing several tons falls in Montréal's Olympic Stadium. It forces the Montreal Expos to play the remainder of their home games on the road.
- September 14 – Cecil Fielder of the Detroit Tigers hits what will be the only home run to ever exit Milwaukee County Stadium during either the Braves' Milwaukee history (1953–1965) or Brewers' park history (1970–2000). The blast comes off Brewer pitcher Dan Plesac in the fourth inning of a 6–4 Tiger victory.
- September 15 – Smokey Burgess, a former major leaguer and previous holder of the record for most pinch-hits, dies at age 64.
- September 16 – Otis Nixon, the league's leading base stealer and catalyst on the Atlanta Braves' run from last to first, fails a drug test and is suspended for sixty days, consisting of the rest of the 1991 baseball season and the first six weeks of the 1992 season. The Braves lose the first two games without Nixon but rebound to win the National League pennant.
- September 22 – The Pittsburgh Pirates become the first National League East team since the 1976-77-78 Philadelphia Phillies to win consecutive division titles when they beat their in-state rival Phillies, 2–1.
- September 29 – The Minnesota Twins become the first team to ever go from last place to first over the course of one season when a Chicago White Sox loss to the Seattle Mariners clinches the American League West title. It is the Twins' first division crown since 1987. The New York Mets fire manager Bud Harrelson on the same day, the eighth managerial firing of the year.

=== October–December ===
- October 2 – Atlanta Braves pitcher Tom Glavine becomes the first 20-game winner in the majors by beating the Cincinnati Reds. The win assures Glavine of the Cy Young Award when it is given in November.
- October 2 – The Toronto Blue Jays capture their third American League East title since 1985 by beating the California Angels 6–5 on a walk-off RBI single by Joe Carter. The same day, the Blue Jays become the first team to ever play before more than four million fans in a single season.
- October 3 – Chicago White Sox catcher Carlton Fisk hits two home runs, including a grand slam, to lead the White Sox to a 13–12 victory over the Minnesota Twins. In doing so, just nine months shy of his 44th birthday, Fisk becomes the oldest 20th-century player to collect a two-HR game. His 7th-inning grand slam off Steve Bedrosian also makes him the oldest major leaguer ever to hit a bases-loaded homer. Cap Anson, at 45, hit two home runs on this date in 1897, and is the oldest major league player to hit a pair.
- October 4 - The Seattle Mariners won their 82nd game over the Chicago White Sox, to post their first winning season.
- October 5 – The Atlanta Braves become the second team in two weeks to go from last to first when they beat the Houston Astros, 5–2. Moments later, the San Francisco Giants eliminate their arch-rivals, the Los Angeles Dodgers, when Trevor Wilson pitches a 4–0 complete game shutout, handing the National League West division title to the Braves. John Smoltz gets his fourteenth win of the season as the Braves close out with eight consecutive wins after trailing the Dodgers by two with only ten games left to play.
- October 6 – New York Mets pitcher David Cone became the fourth National League player to strike out 19 batters for most strikeouts in a single nine-inning game in a 7–0 win against the Philadelphia Phillies.
- October 7 – Leo Durocher, who is credited with the phrase 'nice guys finish last,' dies at the age of 86. The same day, the New York Yankees fire Stump Merrill, the ninth major league manager fired in 1991.
- October 8 – Despite finishing in second, their lowest finish in his 3½ years as manager, the Boston Red Sox dismiss Joe Morgan and replace him with Butch Hobson. Morgan is the tenth manager fired in 1991.
- October 9 – Tom Trebelhorn becomes the eleventh managerial casualty of 1991 despite a record of 40–19 and a finish over .500 with the Milwaukee Brewers.
- October 10 – Despite the large number of firings, the New York Mets hire Jeff Torborg as their new manager, replacing Bud Harrelson. On the same day, however, the Seattle Mariners fire Jim Lefebvre, the twelfth firing of 1991.
- October 18 – Jim Essian, who replaced Don Zimmer in May, is fired as manager of the Chicago Cubs, the thirteenth and last firing of a manager in 1991. The thirteen firings in a season set a majors record that still stands.
- October 27 – The Minnesota Twins become the World Series Champions with a 1–0 victory behind Jack Morris' masterful 10-inning shutout. Gene Larkin's single off Atlanta Braves reliever Alejandro Peña scores Dan Gladden with the game's only run. The game is the first Game Seven to go into extra innings since the 1924 World Series between the Washington Senators and New York Giants. Morris is named the Series MVP for the Twins, who win all four games at home while losing all three in Atlanta. Four of the seven games are decided on the final pitch, while five are decided by a single run, and three in extra innings. All are Series records.
- November 18 – Bobby Bonilla leaves the Pittsburgh Pirates for the New York Mets and becomes the first five-million dollar a year player in major league baseball history.
- November 25 – The Montreal Expos trade first baseman Andrés Galarraga to the St. Louis Cardinals for starting pitcher Ken Hill. Galarraga will struggle for St. Louis before enjoying a career renaissance with the Colorado Rockies in 1993.
