= Major League Baseball on CBS =

MLB baseball broadcast telecasts

- Major League Baseball on CBS media pin.
- Also known as: Major League Baseball Game of the Week
- Genre: American baseball game telecasts
- Written by: Eli Spielman
- Directed by: Robert A. Fishman; Joe Aceti
- Presented by: Sean McDonough; Jack Buck; Tim McCarver; Jim Kaat; Dick Stockton; Greg Gumbel; Pat O'Brien; Jim Gray; Andrea Joyce; Lesley Visser; James Brown
- Narrated by: Don Robertson
- Theme music composer: Bob Christianson; Tony Smythe
- Country of origin: United States
- Original language: English
- No. of seasons: 20 (through 1993 season)
- No. of episodes: 600

Production
- Executive producers: Ted Shaker; Rich Gentile
- Producers: Ric LaCivita; Bob Dekas; George Veras; Bob Mansbach; Craig Silver
- Production locations: Various MLB stadiums (game telecasts)
- Cinematography: Steve Aronson; Bob Albrecht; Sol Bress; Duilio Costabile; Gilbert Deiz; Jim dos Santos; Kim Elston; David Finch; Dan Flaherty; George Graffeo; Terry Jones; Frank Lombardo; Michael Marks; Scott Maynard; Al Mountford; Joe Pausback; George Rothweiler; Bob Wishnie; Tom Adza; Tom Amon; Bob Basile; Vic Dashiell; Chris Kelly; Janis Murray; Deena Sheldon; Tim Walbert; Glenn Hampton; George Schaafsma
- Editors: Shelly Goldmark; Tom Blair; David Bush; Vince Aurilio; Jeff Hargraves; Curtis Elder; Thomas E. Jones; Joe Malecki
- Camera setup: Multi-camera
- Running time: 210 minutes or until game ended (inc. adverts)
- Production companies: Major League Baseball; CBS Sports

Original release
- Network: CBS
- Release: October 2, 1947 – October 1, 1951
- Release: April 16, 1955 – September 25, 1965
- Release: April 14, 1990 – October 23, 1993

Related
- Major League Baseball on CBS Radio; MLB on TBS; MLB Tuesday

Major League Baseball on CBS is an American presentation of Major League Baseball (MLB) games produced by CBS Sports, and televised on the CBS television network. It aired in several variations from 1947 to 1993.

== History ==
CBS has aired Major League Baseball telecasts in several variations dating back to the 1950s.

=== 1947–1951 ===
CBS broadcast Games 3–4 of the 1947 World Series (the first World Series to ever be televised) with Bob Edge on the call. However, the 1947 World Series was only seen in four markets via coaxial inter-connected stations: New York City; Philadelphia; Schenectady, New York; Washington, D.C.; and, environs surrounding these cities. Outside of New York, coverage was pooled, which continued through 1950. By that point, World Series games could be seen in most of the country, but not all.

On July 12, 1949, CBS broadcast the All-Star Game from Ebbets Field in Brooklyn, New York. Red Barber, who was the primary broadcaster for the Brooklyn Dodgers at the time, provided play-by-play. Barber had already, by 1946, added to his Brooklyn duties a job as sports director of the CBS Radio Network, succeeding Ted Husing and continuing through 1955. There, his greatest contribution was to conceive and host the CBS Football Roundup, which switched listeners back and forth between broadcasts of different regional college games each week.

On August 11, 1951, CBS' flagship television station WCBS-TV in New York City broadcast the first baseball game ever televised in color between the Brooklyn Dodgers and Boston Braves from Ebbets Field, in which the Braves beat the Dodgers 8–1. As were all color programs at the time, it was transmitted via a field-sequential color system developed by CBS. Signals transmitted this way could not be seen on existing black-and-white sets. Four years prior on July 21, WCBS used a prototype version of the Zoomar Lens (the first commercially successful zoom lens) to cover a Brooklyn Dodgers/Cincinnati Reds game.

Later that year, CBS televised Game 1 of the National League tie-breaker series between the Dodgers and the New York Giants. Red Barber and Connie Desmond called that particular game and John Derr served as a field reporter. The remaining two games (including the legendary "Shot Heard 'Round the World" that ended Game 3 to send the Giants to the World Series) were broadcast by NBC with Ernie Harwell and Russ Hodges on the call.

=== Original Major League Baseball on CBS program (1955–1965) ===
==== 1955–1958 ====
By 1955, Dizzy Dean and the Game of the Week would move from ABC to CBS (the rights were actually set up through the Falstaff Brewing Corporation). "CBS' stakes were higher" said Buddy Blattner, who left the Mutual Broadcasting System to rejoin Dean. Ron Powers wrote about the reteaming of Dean and Blattner, "they wanted someone who'd known Diz, could bring him out." Gene Kirby, who had worked with Dean and Blattner at Mutual and ABC, produced the telecasts and also filled in on announcing duties.

Bob Finnegan, who along with Bill McColgan had called backup games for ABC, performed the same role for CBS, working with a variety of color men including future Wide World of Sports host Jim McKay and future World News Tonight anchor Frank Reynolds.

In 1956, CBS Sports director Frank Chirkinian devised an earplug called an Intercepted Feed Back (or IFB) in order to connect the announcer, director, producer and thus, smoothing on-air flow.

In 1957, CBS added a Sunday Game of the Week. ABC's Edgar Scherick said "In '53, no one wanted us. Now teams begged for "Game"'s cash." That year, the National Football League (NFL) began a US$14.1 million revenue-sharing pact. By 1965, Major League Baseball ended the large-market blackout, got $6.5 million for exclusivity, and split the pot.

With CBS now carrying the Game of the Week, the network's stations in Phoenix (KOOL-TV), Little Rock (KTHV) and Cedar Rapids (KGAN-TV) were finally receiving the broadcasts. Bud Blattner said "America had never had TV network ball. Now you're getting two games a week [four, counting NBC, by 1959]."

In 1958, Dizzy Dean ruffled the feathers of CBS Sports head Bill MacPhail when he said "I don't know how we come off callin' this the 'Game of the Week'. There's a much better game – Dodgers–Giants – over on NBC." Dean also once refused a Falstaff ad because the date was Mother's Day. When United Airlines backed CBS' Game of the Week telecasts, Dean – who hated to fly – said "If you have to, pod-nuh, Eastern is much the best." That year, George Kell served as host for the pregame show. During one broadcast, Kell hoped to ask guest Casey Stengel about the Yankees' batting order. When asked about how it went, Kell said, "Fine. But in our 15 minutes, Casey didn't get past the leadoff batter."

==== 1959–1963 ====
Jack Whitaker and Frankie Frisch announced the backup games from 1959 to 1961. They usually did games that took place in Philadelphia, New York City, Washington, D.C. or Baltimore. Whitaker once said in three years, he would only broadcast three innings because CBS would not switch away from Dizzy Dean. However, he said that he learned a lot of baseball just sitting next to Frisch. CBS had other backup crews for games featuring the Chicago Cubs and White Sox, Cleveland Indians and Cincinnati Reds. In these cases, Bob Finnegan would handle the play-by-play duties with various analysts depending on the city. CBS did not have Game of the Week rights from any other ballparks in those years.

Pee Wee Reese replaced Blattner as Dean's partner in 1960. That year, Jerry Coleman hosted the pregame show for CBS' Game of the Week broadcasts. A rather embarrassing incident for Coleman occurred when he was interviewing Cookie Lavagetto when the "Star-Spangled Banner" started. Coleman later said, "Believe me, when the Anthem starts, I stop, whether I'm taping, talking, or eating a banana."

In 1962, CBS dropped the Sunday baseball Game of the Week once the NFL season started, dropping the option clause for affiliates to carry baseball or football in place since 1957.

In 1963 and 1964, viewers in San Francisco were unable to see certain baseball telecasts aired by CBS on KPIX-TV locally, although the games aired on stations in markets adjacent to the Bay Area. In 1963, KPIX pre-empted the July 13 game between the San Francisco Giants–Philadelphia Phillies (at 10:15 a.m.), and the Los Angeles Dodgers-Phillies game on July 14 (at 9:30 a.m.); in 1964, the station pre-empted the Kansas City Athletics–New York Yankees game on May 16 (at 10:45) and the Milwaukee Braves–St. Louis Cardinals game on May 17. All four games did air on NBC affiliate KSBW in Salinas, KXTV in Sacramento and ABC affiliate KHSL-TV in Chico (the games also aired on KOLO-TV in Reno, Nevada, however it joined the two July 1963 games in progress, at 10:25 and 9:55 a.m. on the respective dates).

==== 1964–1965 ====
By 1964, CBS' Dean and Reese called games from Yankee Stadium, Wrigley Field, St. Louis, Philadelphia and Baltimore. The New York Yankees got a $550,000 share of CBS' $895,000. Six clubs that exclusively played nationally televised games on NBC were paid $1.2 million. The theme music used on the CBS telecasts during this era was a Dixieland styled rendition of "Take Me Out to the Ballgame".

In 1966, the New York Yankees, which in the year prior played 21 Games of the Week for CBS (which had actually just purchased the Yankees), joined NBC's television package. The new package under NBC called for 28 games compared to the 123 aired across the three networks in 1960.

==== Announcers ====
Play-by-play

- Dizzy Dean (1955–1964; 1965 (Yankee Baseball))
- Bob Finnegan (1955–1961)
- Bill McColgan (1955–1956)
- Jack Whitaker (1959–1961)

Color commentators

- Bud Blattner (1955–1959)
- Frankie Frisch (1959–1961)
- Gabby Hartnett (1959–1960)
- Jim McKay (1955–1957)
- Pee Wee Reese (1960–1964; 1965 (Yankee Baseball))
- Frank Reynolds (1958)

Hosts/field reporters

- Jerry Coleman (1960)
- George Kell (1958)

=== The dark years (1966–1989) ===
As previously alluded to, on October 19, 1965, NBC signed a three-year contract with Major League Baseball. NBC paid roughly US$6 million per year for the 25 Games of the Week, $6.1 million for the 1967 World Series and All-Star Game, and $6.5 million for the 1968 World Series and 1968 All-Star Game. In replacing CBS, NBC traded a circus for a seminar. Pee Wee Reese said "Curt Gowdy was its guy (1966–75), and didn't want Dizzy Dean – too overpowering. Curt was nice, but worried about mistakes. Diz and I just laughed." Falstaff Brewery hyped Dean as Gowdy in return said "I said, 'I can't do "Wabash Cannonball." Our styles clash --" then came Pee Wee Reese. Gowdy added by saying about the pairing between him and Reese, "They figured he was fine with me, and they'd still have their boy." To many, baseball meant CBS's 1955–64 Game of the Week thoroughbred.

In 1976, CBS Radio replaced NBC Radio as the exclusive national radio broadcaster for the World Series and All-Star Game. This came after NBC ended its radio association with baseball in order to clear space for its 24-hour "News And Information" service programming. In 1985, CBS Radio started broadcasting a weekly Game of the Week. CBS Radio usually did two games each Saturday, one on the afternoons and another during the evenings. Typically, CBS' markets aired only the afternoon broadcasts. The games covered varied from the ones NBC-TV were offering at the time to games outside of NBC's sight.

In 1987, CBS broadcast the Pan American Games for the fourth and to date, final time. For the baseball coverage, John Dockery handled the play-by-play with Mark Marquess on color commentary. One year later, CBS broadcast the championship game for the College World Series. Brent Musburger served as the play-by-play announcer that year as well as in 1989. Joining Musburger in the booth was Rick Monday in 1988 and Joe Morgan in 1989.

=== 1990–1993 version ===
By the end of the 1987-88 season, CBS finished in last place and was looking to get themselves out of the slump that had begun when Laurence Tisch effectively took control of the network. They decided that sports would be a very powerful tool to put CBS back on the map. So on that end, they paid a huge sum of money to broadcast Major League Baseball.

On December 14, 1988, CBS announced the results of guidance provided by Commissioner Peter Ueberroth, Major League Baseball's broadcast director Bryan Burns, CBS Inc. CEO Tisch as well as CBS Sports executives Neal Pilson and Eddie Einhorn in making a decision. The network paid approximately US$1.8 billion (equivalent to 2.71 billion in 2025) for exclusive over-the-air television rights for over four years (beginning in 1990). CBS paid about $265 million each year for the World Series, League Championship Series, All-Star Game, and the Saturday Game of the Week. CBS replaced ABC (which had broadcast Monday and later Thursday night baseball games from 1976 to 1989) and NBC (which had broadcast Major League Baseball in some shape or form since 1947 and the Game of the Week exclusively since 1966) as the national broadcast network television home of Major League Baseball.

It was one of the largest agreements (to date) between the sport of baseball and the business of broadcasting. The cost of the deal between CBS and Major League Baseball was about 25% more than in the previous television contract with ABC and NBC. The deal with CBS was also intended to pay each team (26 in 1990 and then, 28 by 1993) $10 million a year. CBS would also be paying an estimated $7.1 million per game or $790,000 per inning, and $132,000 per out; a separate cable television deal would bring each team an additional $4 million. Each team could also cut its own deal with broadcast and cable television channels and radio stations to serve as their local broadcasters (for example, the New York Yankees signed a cable deal with MSG that would pay the team $41 million annually for 12 years). Reportedly, after the huge television contracts with CBS and ESPN were signed, baseball clubs spent their excess millions on free agent players.

Author and presidential speechwriter Curt Smith however, said that Major League Baseball's deal with CBS Sports was "sportscasting's Exxon Valdez." Had baseball valued national promotion provided by the Game of the Week, said Smith, it never would have crafted a fast-bucks plan that has cut off the widest viewership. "It's an obscene imbalance", Smith also said, "to have 175 games going to 60 percent of the country [in reference to Major League Baseball's corresponding cable deal with ESPN, which at the time was only available in about 60% of the country] and 16 games going to the rest." He added: "Baseball has paid a grievous price for being out of sight and out of mind. It's attacked the lower and middle classes that forms baseball's heart. . . . In the end, the advertising community has come to view baseball as a leper."

One possible key factor towards why NBC lost the baseball package to CBS was due to their commitment to broadcasting the 1992 Summer Olympics from Barcelona. Two weeks prior to the announcement of the baseball deal with CBS, NBC had committed itself to paying $401 million for U.S. broadcast rights to the 1992 Summer Olympics. After the baseball deal was announced, some skeptics surmised that CBS had lowballed the Barcelona bidding so that it would have at least $1 billion to spend on baseball.

According to industry insiders, neither NBC nor ABC wanted the entire baseball package—that is, regular-season games, both League Championship Series and the World Series—because such a commitment would have required them to preempt too many highly rated prime time shows. Thus, ABC and NBC bid thinking that two of the networks might share postseason play again or that one of the championship series might wind up on cable. Peter Ueberroth had encouraged the cable idea, but after the bids were opened, NBC and ABC found to their chagrin that he preferred network exposure for all postseason games. Only CBS, with its weak prime time programming, dared go for that.

Before the previous television contract (which ran from 1984 to 1989) with Major League Baseball was signed, CBS was at one point, interested in a pact which would have called for three interleague games airing only on Thursday nights during the season. The proposed deal with CBS involved respectively American League East teams playing the National League East, and the American League West playing the National League West. At the end of their coverage of the 1989 World Series, ABC commentator Al Michaels said:

If you'll indulge us just another moment, this is the end of our association with baseball. I think as many of you may know, the primary package goes to CBS. And to our friends at what's known in the industry as "Black Rock", good luck in 1990 and beyond.

==== Trademarks ====
A trademark of CBS' baseball coverage was its theme music, composed by Bob Christianson and Tony Smythe. One writer in 2015, noting that CBS' coverage of that era was considered by many fans to be "low-quality", remarked that the majestic, mature, and soaring theme music could be considered "the best part of CBS’ baseball coverage".

Besides the prologues (with the play-by-play announcer previewing the upcoming matchup) for the Saturday Game of the Week, the music was usually set to the opening graphic of an opaque rendition of the CBS Eye entering a big, waving red, white and blue bunting and then a smaller, unfolding red, white and blue bunting (over a white diamond) and floating blue banner (which usually featured an indicating year like for instance, "1991 World Series") complete with dark red Old English text.

Pat O'Brien was made the host of the All-Star Game, the postseason, and the World Series, despite having watched, by his own admission, a total of "perhaps two" baseball games in his entire life at that point. New York Post columnist, Phil Mushnick would later accuse O'Brien of being a "style-only artist". Mushnick in particular, cited an incident during a World Series game on CBS, where O'Brien said on air that a player had “scored a home run.”

The network used the slogan "Baseball's biggest moments are on CBS!" to promote its regular season Game of the Week broadcasts.

===== Other music =====
For Pat O'Brien's prologue for Game 3 of the 1990 National League Championship Series, between the Cincinnati Reds and Pittsburgh Pirates, CBS used David Arkenstone's "Desert Ride", which would subsequently be used during Bob Costas' prologue for NBC's coverage of Game 6 of the 1993 NBA Finals between the Chicago Bulls and Phoenix Suns.

During the closing credits of CBS' coverage of Game 4 of the 1990 World Series (after the Cincinnati Reds swept the Oakland Athletics), CBS used James Horner's score from the end credits of the 1989 film Glory.

A recurring theme during CBS' coverage of the postseason was the usage of Michael Kamen's "Overture" from Robin Hood: Prince of Thieves. From start to finish, an audio montage of baseball's most memorable moments played over it, followed by a video and music (with no narration) recap of both League Championship Series and the World Series from 1991 to 1993. The "Training" cue from Robin Hood: Prince of Thieves was played against an all slow-motion montage of the entire series. As Tim McCarver recapped the first six games of the 1991 World Series before Game 7, CBS used Hans Zimmer's "Fighting 17th" from the movie Backdraft for the soundtrack.

During Pat O'Brien's prologue for CBS' coverage of the 1992 Major League Baseball All-Star Game, Ennio Morricone's theme from the 1987 film The Untouchables was used. CBS previously used this particular theme for the prologue of their 1990 National League Championship Series coverage. NBC would subsequently use Morricone's theme during the closing credits for their coverage of Game 6 of the 2000 American League Championship Series (the network's final Major League Baseball broadcast for the next 22 years).

During Pat O'Brien's prologue for Game 1 of the 1991 American League Championship Series between the Minnesota Twins and Toronto Blue Jays and Dick Stockton's prologue for Game 5 of the 1992 American League Championship Series between the Toronto Blue Jays and Oakland Athletics, CBS used "In Celebration of Man" by Yanni, which is now known for being the theme music for NBC's U.S. Open golf coverage. Also during CBS' 1992 ALCS coverage, CBS enlisted the cast of Sesame Street such as Big Bird, Oscar the Grouch and Telly Monster to help with the intros.

During the 1993 All-Star Game and postseason, highlights of past All-Star Games and postseason moments were scored using the John Williams composed theme from the movie Jurassic Park. Also during the commercial breaks of the 1993 All-Star Game, CBS provided a snippet of Don Henley's "The Boys of Summer". Van Halen's "Right Now" was used during the opening for the network's coverage of Game 4 of the 1993 American League Championship Series between the Toronto Blue Jays and Chicago White Sox.

During the prologue for Game 1 of the 1993 World Series, CBS used Hans Zimmer's "The Walk Home" from the movie Cool Runnings. During the prologue for Game 6 of the 1993 World Series (CBS' final Major League Baseball telecast to date), they used Jerry Goldsmith's "Tryouts" from the movie Rudy. Meanwhile, during the closing credits for Game 6 of the 1993 World Series, they used Bob Seger's "The Famous Final Scene" followed by Billy Joel's "Famous Last Words".

==== Year-by-year ====
CBS for the most part, bypassed the division and pennant races. Instead, its schedule focused on games featuring major-market teams, regardless of their record.

===== 1990 =====
Major League Baseball's four-season tenure with CBS (1990–1993) was marred by turmoil and shortcomings throughout. The original plan was for Brent Musburger to be the lead play-by-play announcer for CBS' baseball telecasts (thus, having the tasks of calling the All-Star Game, National League Championship Series, and World Series), with veteran broadcaster and lead CBS Radio baseball voice Jack Buck to serve as the secondary announcer (which would involve calling a second weekly game and the American League Championship Series). Former ABC color commentator Tim McCarver was hired by CBS to be Musburger's partner while NBC's Jim Kaat was hired to be Buck's. However, weeks before CBS was to debut its MLB coverage, on April 1, 1990, Musburger was fired by the network over what CBS perceived to be a power grab by Musburger in taking on the assignment (at the time, Musburger was CBS' lead college basketball announcer, host of The NFL Today, and was the main studio host for the NBA and had felt that he had been given too many broadcasting assignments by the network).

With Musburger's firing, Buck was moved up to the lead broadcast team alongside McCarver. His position as backup announcer alongside Kaat was taken by CBS' lead NBA announcer, Dick Stockton. Studio host Greg Gumbel took over for Stockton as the secondary play-by-play announcer in 1993. Gumbel was in return, replaced by Andrea Joyce, who served as a field reporter for the first three seasons of CBS' coverage. On the teaming of Buck and McCarver, Broadcasting magazine wrote "The network has exclusivity, much rides on them." Joining the team of Buck and McCarver was Lesley Visser (who was, incidentally, married to the aforementioned Dick Stockton), became the first woman to cover the World Series in 1990. It was initially speculated that Dick Stockton would not have been available to contribute as the secondary play-by-play announcer due to his football and basketball commitments for CBS.

In the interim between Brent Musburger's firing and Jack Buck's promotion, there had been speculation that if Al Michaels won an arbitration case involving ABC, he would join CBS as its lead baseball announcer. Michaels had been feuding with the network over an alleged violation of company policy. Michaels' contract with ABC was originally set to expire in late 1992. Ultimately however, ABC announced a contract extension that sources said would keep Michaels at ABC through at least the end of 1995 and would pay him at least $2.2 million annually with the potential to earn more. That would make Michaels the highest-paid sports announcer in television.

Meanwhile, Jim Kaat earned rave reviews for his role as CBS' backup analyst (which flashed a considerable "good-guy air"). Ron Bergman wrote of Kaat's performance during the 1990 ALCS, "This was a night for pitchers to excel. Dave Stewart. Roger Clemens. Jim Kaat [on commentary]." Despite the rave reviews, Jim Kaat admitted that he was frustrated. He felt that at that point and time, the idea of figuring out what to talk about during a three-hour broadcast had become intimidating. As a result, Kaat would bring notes into the booth, but in the process, found himself providing too much detail. He ultimately confided in his broadcasting partner, Dick Stockton, that he wanted to work without notes. So Stockton hooked Kaat up with then-lead NFL on CBS color commentator, John Madden for a telephone seminar. Madden said if he brought notes into the booth he felt compelled to use them and would "force" something into a telecast. On his seminar with John Madden, Jim Kaat said "Then John told me if he did his homework it would be stored in his memory bank. And if it is important it will come out. If it doesn't, it probably wasn't that important."

A mildly notorious moment came during CBS' coverage of the 1990 All-Star Game from Wrigley Field in Chicago. In a game that was marred by rain delays for a combined 85 minutes (including a 68-minute monsoon during the 7th inning), CBS annoyed many diehard fans by airing the William Shatner-hosted reality series Rescue 911 during the delay.

====== Regular season ======
On April 7, CBS aired a special program called Season of Dreams: Baseball 1990. Hosted by Greg Gumbel, the special not only previewed the 1990 Major League Baseball season, but also CBS' upcoming baseball coverage in general. Joining Gumbel were CBS Sports analyst Tim McCarver and Pat O'Brien, who presented a segment on the numerous player transitions, leading up to the start of the 1990 season.

CBS initially did not want to start their 1990 coverage until after CBS had aired that year's NBA Finals (which was the last time CBS aired the Finals before the NBA's move to NBC). Therefore, only 12 regular season telecasts were scheduled The broadcasts would have been on each Saturday from June 16 through August 25 and a special Sunday telecast on the weekend of August 11–12 (the New York Yankees against the Oakland Athletics in Oakland on both days). Ultimately, four more telecasts were added – two in April and two on the last two Saturdays of the season.

On September 22, CBS was scheduled to televise a game between the Boston Red Sox and New York Yankees from Yankee Stadium at 12 p.m. Eastern Time. The start of game was however, delayed for approximately, five hours due to rain. Instead, CBS broadcast the St. Louis Cardinals–Pittsburgh Pirates game from Three Rivers Stadium in Pittsburgh in the national window at noon. Following their baseball coverage, CBS was scheduled to broadcast a college football game between the Alabama Crimson Tide and Georgia Bulldogs at 3 p.m. EST. Consequently, CBS was unable to televise the Boston–New York game once the rain finally ceased just around 5:30 p.m. EST, including in the local teams' markets.

Date	Teams	Announcers
April 14, 1990	Chicago Cubs at Pittsburgh; Los Angeles at Houston	Jack Buck and Tim McCarver; Dick Stockton and Jim Kaat
April 21, 1990	Montréal at New York Mets; California at Minnesota	Jack Buck and Tim McCarver; Dick Stockton and Jim Kaat
June 16, 1990	Boston at Baltimore; San Diego at Los Angeles	Jack Buck and Tim McCarver; Dick Stockton and Jim Kaat
June 23, 1990	St. Louis at Chicago Cubs; San Francisco at Houston	Jack Buck and Tim McCarver; Dick Stockton and Jim Kaat
June 30, 1990	Oakland at Toronto	Jack Buck and Tim McCarver
July 7, 1990	Chicago Cubs at San Francisco; Minnesota at New York Yankees	Jack Buck and Tim McCarver; Dick Stockton and Jim Kaat
July 10, 1990	All-Star Game (Wrigley Field, Chicago)	Jack Buck and Tim McCarver
July 14, 1990	Kansas City at Boston; San Diego at Pittsburgh	Greg Gumbel and Jim Kaat; Jack Buck and Tim McCarver
July 21, 1990	San Francisco at Chicago Cubs; Philadelphia at Cincinnati	Dick Stockton and Jim Kaat; Jack Buck and Tim McCarver
July 28, 1990	St. Louis at New York Mets; Baltimore at Kansas City	Jack Buck and Tim McCarver; Dick Stockton and Jim Kaat
August 4, 1990	Los Angeles at San Francisco; New York Mets at St. Louis	Jack Buck and Tim McCarver; Dick Stockton and Jim Kaat
August 11, 1990	New York Yankees at Oakland; Texas at Chicago White Sox	Jack Buck and Tim McCarver; Dick Stockton and Jim Kaat
August 12, 1990	New York Yankees at Oakland	Jack Buck and Tim McCarver
August 18, 1990	California at Boston; Pittsburgh at Cincinnati	Dick Stockton and Jim Kaat; Jack Buck and Tim McCarver
August 25, 1990	New York Mets at Los Angeles; Boston at Toronto	Jack Buck and Tim McCarver; Dick Stockton and Jim Kaat
September 22, 1990	St. Louis at Pittsburgh; Boston at New York Yankees	Jack Buck and Tim McCarver; Dick Stockton and Jim Kaat
September 29, 1990	San Diego at Cincinnati; Boston at Toronto	Jack Buck and Tim McCarver; Dick Stockton and Jim Kaat

====== Postseason ======
The 1990 postseason started on a Thursday, while World Series started on a Tuesday due to the brief lockout. Major League Baseball and CBS went with some rather unconventional scheduling during the LCS round, with two consecutive scheduled off-days in the NLCS after Game 2.

After NBC lost the Major League Baseball package to CBS, NBC aggressively counter-programmed CBS' postseason baseball coverage with made-for-TV movies and miniseries geared towards female viewers.

CBS' first year of Major League Baseball postseason coverage in general, proved to be problematic for the network. First and foremost, none of the teams involved in the ALCS (Boston and Oakland), NLCS (Cincinnati and Pittsburgh), and World Series (Cincinnati and Oakland) involved teams from baseball's largest media markets. This more than likely, helped reduce playoff ratings by 9.4% for prime time games and 3.4% for weekend daytime games. This was below the levels of the playoffs the year before, when they aired on NBC.

While the ratings for the 1990 World Series improved to 26.2 compared to 1989, the 1989 Series (which aired on ABC) was interrupted for 10 days by the Loma Prieta earthquake. All in all, the 1989 World Series was at the time, the lowest rated World Series ever. More to the point, the ratings for the 1990 World Series on CBS were significantly lower than any World Series between 1982 and 1988.

Although the 1990 NLCS lasted six games, that year's ALCS and more importantly, the World Series, lasted only four out of seven possible games. To put things into proper perspective, by one estimate, CBS lost $5 million for each playoff game not played and US$15.4 million for each World Series game not played. Ultimately, CBS lost $12 million to $15 million on each of the League Championship Series and World Series games not played, for a total of $36 million to $45 million.

===== 1991 =====
CBS claimed to have lost about $55 million on its baseball coverage in after-taxes revenue in 1990. The losses eventually totaled $170 million by the end of the four-year contract. The losses were partially due to a shorter-than-usual postseason, which ended when the Cincinnati Reds swept the defending World Champion Oakland Athletics in the World Series in four games. CBS made several adjustments for 1991. Regular season telecasts were reduced to a meager handful. In return, pregame shows during the League Championship Series were eliminated, to minimize the ratings damage.

On Sunday, May 5, CBS broadcast games involving Cleveland at Oakland (with Jack Buck and Tim McCarver on the call) and Boston at the Chicago White Sox (with Dick Stockton and Jim Kaat on the call). On Sunday, July 14, Dick Stockton and Jim Kaat called a game in Anaheim between the New York Yankees and California Angels.

For CBS' coverage of the 1991 All-Star Game from Toronto, CBS started their broadcast at the top of the hour with the customary pregame coverage. Because American President George H.W. Bush and Canadian Prime Minister Brian Mulroney were throwing out the first ball, there was a slight delay from the 8:30 p.m. EDT start. The game eventually started about 15–20 minutes late. CBS began starting the prime time broadcasts at 8:30 for the final two years of the contract, with little or no pregame content.

In the 1991 World Series between the Minnesota Twins and Atlanta Braves, four games were won during the teams' final at-bat, and three of these, including the seventh and decisive game, were in extra innings. In the sixth game, Jack Buck famously called Minnesota left fielder Kirby Puckett's game-winning home run off of Charlie Leibrandt with the line "And we'll see you tomorrow night!" Ultimately, the tightly contested, seven-game affair between Minnesota and Atlanta earned CBS the highest ratings for a World Series since the 1986 World Series between the New York Mets and Boston Red Sox on NBC. In Washington, D.C., Game 7 of the 1991 World Series was pushed aside to independent station WDCA 20 so that CBS' WUSA 9 could air the Washington Redskins' NFL game against the New York Giants. Meanwhile, CBS' affiliate in Minneapolis, WCCO 4, had to miss the beginning of the pregame show for Game 7 because an NFL contest that CBS broadcast between the Minnesota Vikings and Phoenix Cardinals ended late.

The Twins are going to win the World Series!!! The Twins have won it! It's a base hit, it's a one-nothing...ten inning victory!!!

— Jack Buck calling Gene Larkin's 1991 World Series clinching hit.

Earlier in the postseason, CBS' coverage of the ALCS meant that they could not carry the live testimony of Clarence Thomas, whose confirmation to the United States Supreme Court was put into question because of charges of sexual harassment from former staffer Anita Hill. Meanwhile, ABC, NBC, CNN and PBS all carried the testimony.

As previously mentioned, as CBS' baseball coverage progressed, CBS dropped its 8:00 p.m. pregame coverage (in favor of airing sitcoms such as Evening Shade), before finally starting their coverage at 8:30 p.m. Eastern Time. The first pitch would generally arrive at approximately 8:45 p.m. Perhaps as a result, Joe Carter's World Series clinching home run off Mitch Williams in 1993, occurred at 12 a.m. on the East Coast.

====== Regular season ======
Date	Teams	Announcers
April 20, 1991	New York Mets at Montréal; Detroit at Chicago White Sox	Dick Stockton and Jim Kaat; Jack Buck and Tim McCarver
April 27, 1991	Chicago Cubs at Cincinnati; Seattle at Minnesota	Jack Buck and Tim McCarver; Dick Stockton and Jim Kaat
May 5, 1991	Boston at Chicago White Sox; Cleveland at Oakland	Dick Stockton and Jim Kaat; Jack Buck and Tim McCarver
May 18, 1991	New York Mets at Los Angeles	Jack Buck and Tim McCarver
May 25, 1991	Los Angeles at Cincinnati; Cleveland at Milwaukee	Dick Stockton and Jim Kaat; Jack Buck and Tim McCarver
June 15, 1991	Chicago Cubs at San Diego	Dick Stockton and Jim Kaat
June 22, 1991	Pittsburgh at Los Angeles	Jack Buck and Tim McCarver
June 29, 1991	St. Louis at Chicago Cubs; Boston at Baltimore	Jack Buck and Tim McCarver; Dick Stockton and Jim Kaat
July 9, 1991	All-Star Game (SkyDome, Toronto)	Jack Buck and Tim McCarver
July 14, 1991	New York Yankees at California	Dick Stockton and Jim Kaat
July 20, 1991	Los Angeles at New York Mets; Detroit at Kansas City	Jack Buck and Tim McCarver; Dick Stockton and Jim Kaat
August 3, 1991	Toronto at Boston; Pittsburgh at St. Louis	Jack Buck and Tim McCarver; Dick Stockton and Jim Kaat
August 24, 1991	Cincinnati at New York Mets; New York Yankees at Toronto	Jack Buck and Tim McCarver; Dick Stockton and Jim Kaat
September 14, 1991	Los Angeles at Atlanta; Oakland at Toronto	Jack Buck and Tim McCarver; Dick Stockton and Jim Kaat
September 21, 1991	Toronto at Oakland	Dick Stockton and Tim McCarver
September 28, 1991	San Francisco at Los Angeles; Atlanta at Houston	Jack Buck and Tim McCarver; Dick Stockton and Jim Kaat
October 5, 1991	Houston at Atlanta; Los Angeles at San Francisco	Dick Stockton and Jim Kaat; Jack Buck and Tim McCarver

==== Sean McDonough replaces Jack Buck ====
After two years of calling baseball telecasts for CBS, Jack Buck was dismissed in December 1991. According to the radio veteran Buck, he had a hard time adjusting to the demands of a more constricting television production. CBS felt that Buck should have done more to make himself appear to be a set-up man for lead analyst Tim McCarver. Buck was also criticized for miscalls and anticipating the outcome of plays. Jack Buck's son Joe tried to rationalize his father's on-air problems by saying "My dad was brought up in the golden age of radio, I think he had his hands tied somewhat, being accustomed to the freedom of radio. I'm more used to acquiescing to what the producer wants to do, what the director wants to do."

Ric LaCivita, CBS' coordinating producer for baseball, said in July 1992 in regards to working with Jack Buck for two seasons: "There were different styles in the booth that made it difficult to create the type of production that benefited from Tim's skills. My job is to create an atmosphere where our people can do the best job, with people talking in the truck and an announcer who was doing radio calls instead of TV calls."

Buck himself sized up CBS' handling of the announcers by saying "CBS never got that baseball play-by-play draws word-pictures. All they knew was that football stars analysts. So they said, 'Let [analyst Tim] McCarver run the show.' In television, all they want you to do is shut up. I'm not very good at shutting up." Buck though, would add that although he knew Tim McCarver well, they never developed a good relationship with each other on the air despite high hopes to the contrary. Phil Mushnick added insult to injury to Buck by accusing him of "trying to predict plays, as if to prove he was still on top."

My biggest problem was understanding my role. They wanted him to dominate the broadcast and have me be the mechanic and stay out of the way. I didn't want to broadcast that way. I guess I should have accepted it, but relying on my experience on GrandStand (NBC's NFL pregame show that Buck hosted in 1975) when I had not challenged anyone, I couldn't let others make all the decisions that put me in a position where I couldn't perform at all.

— Jack Buck in his autobiography That's a Winner.

Buck also got into deep trouble with CBS executives (namely executive producer Ted Shaker) over questionable comments made towards singer Bobby Vinton in 1990. While on-air prior to Game 4 of that year's NLCS in Pittsburgh, Buck criticized Vinton's off-key rendition of "The Star-Spangled Banner", making a comment towards Vinton that sounded like a prejudicial remark centered on his Polish heritage. Joe Buck believed that the situation was ironic because his father was "trying to help the guy." Buck began receiving death threats from Pirate fans and discovered a footprint on his pillow once he returned to his hotel room.

===== 1992 =====
Buck's replacement was Boston Red Sox announcer Sean McDonough. Ted Shaker called McDonough about his interests for the top announcing job, and after McDonough hung up the telephone, he claimed that he did not want to "act like a 10-year-old" but he "jumped so high that he put a hole in his ceiling." McDonough, who was 30 years old at the time, became the youngest full-time network announcer to call a World Series when he called that year's Fall Classic alongside McCarver.

For CBS' coverage of the 1992 All-Star Game, they introduced Basecam, a lipstick-size camera, inside first base.

Throughout Game 2 of the 1992 ALCS, Jim Kaat was stricken with a bad case of laryngitis. As a result, Johnny Bench had to come over from the CBS Radio booth and finish the game with Dick Stockton as a "relief analyst." There was talk that if Kaat's laryngitis did not get better, Don Drysdale was going to replace Kaat on television for the rest of ALCS, while Bench would continue to work on CBS Radio.

Tim McCarver ran afoul of Atlanta Braves outfielder Deion Sanders during the 1992 postseason, when he made comments on-air criticizing Sanders for his two-sport athletic career; Sanders was playing for both the Braves and the NFL's Atlanta Falcons at the time and participated in both the baseball postseason and the early NFL regular season for the first time in 1992 (Sanders was unable to do this in 1991, as his NFL contract with the Falcons would not allow him to). Sanders retaliated following Game 7 of the NLCS by dumping a bucket of ice water on McCarver (who was wired for sound and feared electrocution).

He was not immune to criticism from outside sources, either, as Norman Chad wrote a critique of him in Sports Illustrated during the postseason. Chad said that McCarver was someone who "when you ask him the time, will tell you how a watch works", a reference to McCarver's perceived tendency to overanalyze things. Chad went further by saying "What's the difference between Tim McCarver and appendicitis? Appendicitis is covered by most health plans."

He was also known to make gaffes from time to time. One of his more amusing miscues came during the 1992 National League Championship Series when he repeatedly referred to Pittsburgh Pirates pitcher Tim Wakefield as "Bill Wakefield. He finally explained that Bill Wakefield was one of his old minor-league teammates, and he laughed at himself because "I forgot my own name!" The year prior, during Game 6 of the World Series, McCarver's broadcast colleague, Jack Buck talked about Atlanta third baseman Terry Pendleton, who hit .367 in the series. Buck said, "TP. That's what his teammates call him." A few seconds later, McCarver rather oddly added, "TP. An appropriate name for someone who plays on the Braves."

During the 1992 postseason, CBS missed covering one of the three debates among U.S. presidential candidates George H.W. Bush, Bill Clinton. and H. Ross Perot. CBS had planned to join other broadcast and cable networks in the telecast; however, Game 4 of the ALCS between the Toronto Blue Jays and Oakland Athletics did not end until 8:30 p.m. Eastern Time, about the time the debate ended. The Blue Jays won the game 7–6 in 11 innings. The other networks reported very good ratings for the debate, part of one of the more compelling election campaigns in recent times.

The 1992 NLCS between the Atlanta Braves and Pittsburgh Pirates meanwhile, ended in dramatic fashion; in the bottom of the ninth inning of Game 7, with Atlanta down 2–1 and the bases loaded, the Braves' Francisco Cabrera cracked a two-run single that scored David Justice and Sid Bream. Bream famously slid to score the Series-winning run, beating the throw by Pirates left fielder Barry Bonds. Don Ohlmeyer, the former head of NBC Sports and President of NBC West Coast, supposedly called the event "one of the most exciting baseball moments he had ever seen," albeit regretting the time of day it took place.

Line-drive and a base-hit! Justice has scored the tying run, Bream to the plate...and he is SAFE! Safe at the plate! The Braves go to the World Series! The unlikeliest of heroes wins the National League Championship Series for the Atlanta Braves. Francisco Cabrera, who had only ten at-bats in the major leagues during the regular season, singled through the left side, scoring Sid Bream from second base with the winning run. Bream, who's had five knee operations in his lifetime, just beat the tag from his ex-mate Mike LaValliere and Atlanta pulls out Game 7 with three runs in the bottom of the ninth inning. This place is bedlam. There will be no second nightmare for Bobby Cox. Final score in Game 7 of the National League Championship Series: the Braves 3 and the Pirates 2.

— Sean McDonough's description of the final moments of Game 7 of the 1992 National League Championship Series.

====== Regular season ======
For the 1992 season, CBS chose from three games on most Saturdays, thus giving them more flexibility. The Chicago Cubs, St. Louis Cardinals, Boston Red Sox, Atlanta Braves, and Los Angeles Dodgers all agreed to increase their maximum number of network exposures before the final two weeks of the season from four to five. This would've been when any scheduled game was eligible for broadcast. More to the point, with two or three matchups tentatively scheduled for each date, CBS had the option to select the best game two weeks before the telecast. For instance, the Red Sox could appear on CBS as many as five times, the New York Mets four times, and the New York Yankees once.

Note: All times eastern

Date	Teams	Announcers
April 18, 1992	Chicago Cubs at St. Louis; Detroit at Baltimore	Sean McDonough and Tim McCarver; Dick Stockton and Jim Kaat
April 25, 1992	Oakland at Minnesota (1 p.m.)	Sean McDonough and Tim McCarver
May 2, 1992	New York Mets at Atlanta; Texas at Chicago White Sox (1 p.m.)	Dick Stockton and Jim Kaat; Sean McDonough and Tim McCarver
June 13, 1992	Boston at Toronto (1 p.m.); Los Angeles at Cincinnati (1 p.m.)	Sean McDonough and Tim McCarver; Dick Stockton and Jim Kaat
June 20, 1992	San Diego at San Francisco (3 p.m.)	Dick Stockton and Jim Kaat
June 27, 1992	New York Mets at St. Louis; Atlanta at Cincinnati	Sean McDonough and Tim McCarver; Dick Stockton and Jim Kaat
July 4, 1992	Chicago Cubs at Atlanta; Cincinnati at Pittsburgh	Sean McDonough and Tim McCarver; Dick Stockton and Jim Kaat
July 11, 1992	St. Louis at Los Angeles	Sean McDonough and Tim McCarver
July 14, 1992	All-Star Game (Jack Murphy Stadium, San Diego; 8 p.m.)	Sean McDonough and Tim McCarver
July 18, 1992	Baltimore at Texas (1 p.m.)	Sean McDonough and Tim McCarver
July 25, 1992	Minnesota at Boston; Texas at Baltimore	Dick Stockton and Jim Kaat; Sean McDonough and Tim McCarver
August 1, 1992	New York Yankees at Toronto (1 p.m.); Oakland at Kansas City (1 p.m.)	Dick Stockton and Jim Kaat; Sean McDonough and Tim McCarver
August 8, 1992	Los Angeles at Atlanta; New York Mets at Chicago Cubs (1 p.m.)	Sean McDonough and Tim McCarver; Dick Stockton and Jim Kaat
August 29, 1992	Cincinnati at New York Mets; Milwaukee at Toronto (1 p.m.)	Dick Stockton and Jim Kaat; Sean McDonough and Tim McCarver
September 19, 1992	Texas at Toronto (3 p.m.); Baltimore at Milwaukee	Sean McDonough and Tim McCarver; Dick Stockton and Jim Kaat
September 26, 1992	Oakland at Milwaukee; New York Mets at Pittsburgh	Dick Stockton and Jim Kaat; Sean McDonough and Tim McCarver
October 3, 1992	Detroit at Toronto (3 p.m.); Milwaukee at Oakland	Sean McDonough and Tim McCarver; Dick Stockton and Jim Kaat

===== 1993 =====
On May 22, 1993, WIVB 4, CBS' affiliate in Buffalo, New York, bypassed CBS' Saturday afternoon baseball coverage for the second consecutive week. According to a CBS spokesperson, the King World owned Channel 4 was the only affiliate in the country to drop baseball the previous Saturday and would be the only affiliate to skip May 22's game, too. WIVB in baseball's place, ran paid programming. Channel 4's Twila Henneberger said "We're not carrying the games this month and we're looking at them on an individual basis after that. There is minimal interest in viewership of baseball, plus a lot of opportunities to watch all week and during the evenings. Interest on part of the advertisers is not there, either." Their decision to drop baseball for two weeks came about a week after CBS appeared to fail in its bid to keep the sport after the 1993 season.

Lesley Visser missed the first half of the 1993 season due to injuries earlier suffered in a bizarre jogging accident in New York City's Central Park. Visser broke her hip and skidded face-first across the pavement, requiring reconstructive plastic surgery on her face and more than a decade later required an artificial hip replacement. She missed the Major League Baseball All-Star Game. Jim Kaat would replace her while she recuperated. Jim Gray also served as a reporter for the All-Star Game and World Series.

As previously mentioned, for 1993, CBS made a broadcast booth change by removing Dick Stockton from his role as secondary play-by-play announcer after three seasons, and replacing him with Greg Gumbel. Also as previously mentioned, also during the 1993 season, Andrea Joyce replaced Gumbel as studio host. Joyce would be joined at the anchor desk by Pat O'Brien. At the 1993 World Series, she became the first woman to co-host the network television coverage for a World Series. Sean McDonough filled in for O'Brien, who was suffering from laryngitis, as the pregame host for Game 6 of the 1993 National League Championship Series. Game 6 of the NLCS by the way, didn't have its first pitch until nearly 8:50 p.m. EST so that CBS could run 60 Minutes in its entirety. During CBS' coverage of the World Series, umpires were upset with the overhead replays being televised by CBS. Dave Phillips, the crew chief, said just prior to Game 2 that the umpires want "CBS to be fair with their approach." Rick Gentile, senior vice president for production for CBS Sports, said that Richie Phillips, the lawyer for the Major League Umpires Association, tried to call the broadcast booth during Saturday's game, but the call was not put through. Richie Phillips apparently was upset when Dave Phillips called the Philadelphia Phillies' Ricky Jordan out on strikes in the fourth inning, and a replay showed the pitch to be about 6 inches outside. National League President Bill White, while using a CBS headset in the broadcast booth during Game 1, was overheard telling Gentile and the producer Bob Dekas, "You guys keep using that camera the way you want. Don't let Phillips intimidate you."

====== Regular season ======
Date	Teams	Announcers
April 17, 1993	New York Mets at Cincinnati; Chicago White Sox at Boston	Greg Gumbel and Jim Kaat; Sean McDonough and Tim McCarver
April 24, 1993	Florida at Colorado; Cincinnati at Chicago Cubs	Sean McDonough and Tim McCarver; Greg Gumbel and Jim Kaat
May 1, 1993	St. Louis at Atlanta	Sean McDonough and Tim McCarver
May 8, 1993	Baltimore at Toronto (1 p.m.)	Sean McDonough and Tim McCarver
May 15, 1993	Los Angeles at Houston	Sean McDonough and Tim McCarver
May 22, 1993	New York Yankees at Boston; California at Texas	Sean McDonough and Tim McCarver; Greg Gumbel and Jim Kaat
May 29, 1993	San Francisco at Atlanta; Montréal at Chicago Cubs	Greg Gumbel and Jim Kaat; Sean McDonough and Tim McCarver
July 10, 1993	San Francisco at Philadelphia; Detroit at Kansas City	Sean McDonough and Tim McCarver; Greg Gumbel and Jim Kaat
July 13, 1993	All-Star Game (Oriole Park at Camden Yards, Baltimore; 8 p.m.)	Sean McDonough and Tim McCarver
July 17, 1993	Oakland at New York Yankees; Houston at St. Louis	Sean McDonough and Tim McCarver; Greg Gumbel and Jim Kaat
July 24, 1993	Philadelphia at San Francisco	Sean McDonough and Tim McCarver
July 31, 1993	Detroit at Toronto; Atlanta at Houston	Greg Gumbel and Jim Kaat; Sean McDonough and Tim McCarver
August 7, 1993	Boston at Detroit; Chicago Cubs at St. Louis	Sean McDonough and Tim McCarver; Jim Kaat and Steve Stone
August 28, 1993	Chicago Cubs at Atlanta	Greg Gumbel and Jim Kaat
September 18, 1993	Boston at New York Yankees; New York Mets at Atlanta	Greg Gumbel and Jim Kaat; Sean McDonough and Tim McCarver
September 25, 1993	Atlanta at Philadelphia	Sean McDonough and Tim McCarver
October 2, 1993	San Francisco at Los Angeles; Colorado at Atlanta	Sean McDonough and Tim McCarver; Greg Gumbel and Jim Kaat

==== The end of Major League Baseball on CBS ====
After the fallout from CBS' financial problems from their exclusive, four-year-long, US$1.8 billion television contract with Major League Baseball (a contract that ultimately cost CBS approximately $500 million), Major League Baseball decided to go into the business of producing the telecasts themselves and market these to advertisers on its own. Therefore, in May 1993, Major League Baseball officially announced a revenue sharing agreement with ABC and NBC that would call for Major League Baseball to receive 85% of the first US$140 million in advertising revenue (or 87.5% of advertising revenues and corporate sponsorship from the games until sales topped a specified level), 50% of the next $30 million, and 80% of any additional money. Prior to this, Major League Baseball was projected to take a projected 55% cut in rights fees and receive a typical rights fee from the networks. When compared to the previous television deal with CBS, The Baseball Network was supposed to bring in 50% less of the broadcasting revenue. The advertisers were reportedly excited about the arrangement with The Baseball Network because the new package included several changes intended to boost ratings, especially among younger viewers.

The final Major League Baseball game that CBS has televised to date was Game 6 of the 1993 World Series on October 23. Before Major League Baseball decided to seek the services of other networks, CBS offered US$120 million in annual rights fees over a two-year period, as well as advertising revenues in excess of $150 million a season.

Upon being asked about the news of CBS having to end their relationship with Major League Baseball after only four years, Sean McDonough told the New York Times "It's all the words you can think of, frustrating, disappointing and sad, particularly because it's going so well. Hopefully, this will just be a cyclical thing and we can get back into it, maybe in two years." When Toronto's Joe Carter hit his 1993 World Series clinching home run off of Philadelphia Phillies closer Mitch Williams, McDonough said "Well-hit down the left-field line! Way back and GONE! Joe Carter with a three-run homer! The winners and still world champions, the Toronto Blue Jays!"

You know as Tony Kubek once said about Mickey Mantle "Just as he was learning to say hello, he was saying goodbye!" This is kind of the way we feel here at CBS Sports. It doesn't seem possible that our four years as the caretaker of the "National Pastime" are over, but here we are...saying goodbye. And in that short time, not only did we have probably one of the greatest World Series ever between Atlanta and Minnesota, the seven gamer, we also had arguably, one of the greatest World Series games the other night. And folks, how about this one tonight!? In all, and you're looking at them now, a lot of memories...a lot of good memories! And we hoped that you cherish these pictures and these sounds as much as we enjoyed bringing them right into your homes. Time to say goodbye, but knowing full well...that the grand ol' game will never say goodbye! It's just keeps rolling up...the memories! For all of us here at CBS Sports, I'm Pat O'Brien, thank you...for watching and...goodnight everybody!

— Host Pat O'Brien at the conclusion of CBS' coverage of the Game 6 of 1993 World Series and its four-year-long coverage of Major League Baseball as a whole.

Shortly after the start of the 1994–95 Major League Baseball strike, Stanford University's Roger Noll argued that the Baseball Network deal (and the bargain-basement ESPN cable renewal, which went from $100 million to $42 million because of their losses) reflected "poor business judgment on the part of management about the long-run attractiveness of their product to national broadcasters." He added that the $140 million that owners expected to share for the 1994 season (before the strike) from TBN was underestimated by "one-third to one-half" and fell below the annual average of $165 million needed to renew the TBN deal after two years. Meanwhile, Andy Zimbalist, author of Baseball and Billions, and a players' union consulting economist, insisted that baseball "could have done better than the TBN deal with some combination of CBS (which as previously mentioned, offered $120 million last-ditch bid for renewal), Fox and TBS. Baseball shut out CBS and could have waited longer before closing them out."

In October 1995, when it was a known fact that ABC and NBC were going to end their television deal/joint venture with Major League Baseball, preliminary talks arose about CBS resuming its role as MLB's national over-the-air broadcaster. It was rumored that CBS would show Thursday night games (more specifically, a package of West Coast inter-league games scheduled for the 11:30 p.m. Eastern/8:30 Pacific Time slot) while Fox would show Saturday afternoon games. CBS and Fox were also rumored to share rights to the postseason. At the time, CBS Sports President David Kenin said in a statement, "We are interested in all major sports properties and obviously Major League Baseball is one of them. If we can conceive an arrangement that makes sense, naturally we'd be very interested in acquiring some kind of baseball package." In the end however, CBS' involvement did not come to pass and NBC became Fox's over-the-air national television partner. Whereas each team earned about $14 million in 1990 under CBS, the later television agreement with NBC and Fox beginning in 1996 earned each team about $6.8 million.

===== Aftermath =====
After CBS' contract with Major League Baseball expired following the 1993 season, Tim McCarver returned to ABC (and to his broadcast partners prior to coming to CBS, Al Michaels and Jim Palmer) for the next two years under the short-lived "Baseball Network" joint-venture. After calling Games 1, 4–5 of the 1995 World Series for ABC (NBC's Bob Costas, Joe Morgan, and Bob Uecker called the other games), McCarver moved to Fox to form the lead broadcast team with Joe Buck. With the exception of 1997 and 1999 (when NBC held the broadcasting rights), McCarver would help broadcast every World Series from 1996 until his retirement from national TV broadcasts in 2013. Ten years prior to that, McCarver set a record by broadcasting his 13th World Series on national television (surpassing Curt Gowdy); in all, he called 24 Fall Classics for ABC, CBS, and Fox.

Meanwhile, despite the loss of Major League Baseball, Sean McDonough stayed on at CBS Sports calling among other things, the College World Series. In fact, three years after calling Joe Carter's World Series clinching home run in Toronto, McDonough while calling the College World Series for CBS alongside Steve Garvey, McDonough called another series clinching home run. This time, it was Warren Morris, who hit a two out, 9th inning walk-off home run that won the 1996 College World Series for the Louisiana State University Fighting Tigers against Miami. Sean McDonough's run at CBS came to an end in December 1999, when CBS Sports President Sean McManus informed McDonough that his contract would not be renewed. Once Dick Enberg, late of NBC became available, McDonough basically became the odd man out.

In 1994, Jim Kaat was the lead analyst on Baseball Tonight for ESPN's coverage of Major League Baseball. In 1995, he was nominated for a New York Emmy Award for "On Camera Achievement." Also in 1995, Kaat called the American League playoffs with Brent Musburger for ABC/The Baseball Network including the New York Yankees–Seattle Mariners Division Series. He served his second stint as an announcer for Yankees games on the MSG Network/YES Network (1995–2006), where his straight-shooting style was much in the mode of former Yankees broadcasters Tony Kubek and Bill White. Towards the end of his second stint with the Yankees, his workload decreased. In 2006, he only broadcast 65 games. Despite his decreased work load, Kaat won another Emmy for on-air achievement in 2006. In an on-air broadcast on September 10, 2006 with booth partner Ken Singleton, Kaat acknowledged his plan to end his broadcasting career. His final appearance in the booth was to be a New York Yankees–Boston Red Sox game on September 15, 2006 (Kaat was also set to throw out the first pitch). However, the game was postponed due to rain. Kaat later announced that he was going to record a special farewell message to the fans, but would not return for any additional broadcasts. However, the following day, Kaat did announce one full inning of the first game of Saturday September 16's doubleheader on Fox along with Tim McCarver and Josh Lewin. During that Fox telecast he was able to say goodbye to the Yankees fans, an opportunity that the previous night's rainout had deprived him of doing on the YES Network. In 2009, Kaat joined the recently launched MLB Network as a color commentator for their MLB Network Showcase series. Kaat also writes a weekly on-line blog for the Yankees (YES) Network, Kaat's Korner, and contributes video blogs and interviews regularly with national and international media outlets. One of the reasons he got back into regular broadcasting was because after his wife died, Tim McCarver and Elizabeth Schumacher, his friend and business manager, urged him to get back into the game. He also called Pool D in Puerto Rico for the 2009 World Baseball Classic games for an international feed.

Greg Gumbel moved to NBC in 1994 following CBS' losses of the NFL and Major League Baseball broadcasting contracts (Gumbel's last on-air assignment for CBS was providing play-by-play for the College World Series). While at NBC, Gumbel hosted NBC's coverage of the 1994 Major League Baseball All-Star Game. He also did play-by-play for the 1995 Major League Baseball National League Division Series and National League Championship Series (on both occasions, teaming with Joe Morgan), did play-by-play for The NBA on NBC, hosted NBC's daytime coverage of the 1996 Summer Olympics from Atlanta, Georgia, hosted the 1995 World Championships of Figure Skating, and served as the studio host for The NFL on NBC. Gumbel left NBC after the network broadcast of Super Bowl XXXII to return to CBS. His first major assignment was to serve as studio host for the network's coverage of college basketball, including the NCAA men's basketball tournament, which he continued through 2023. He also assumed the role as lead play-by-play announcer for the NFL on CBS, and in January 2001, became the first African-American to serve as play-by-play announcer for a Super Bowl when he called Super Bowl XXXV. Gumbel later resumed hosting The NFL Today on CBS (swapping places with Jim Nantz) before transitioning back to play-by-play duties, primarily as No. 2 NFL announcer, when CBS hired James Brown away from Fox to host The NFL Today. Gumbel died on December 27, 2024.

Dick Stockton left CBS in 1994 for Fox Sports, which employed him on NFL and Major League Baseball telecasts for nearly three decades. For Fox's MLB coverage, he worked with Eric Karros, Joe Girardi, Mark Grace and Tim McCarver and others. From 1993 to 1995, Stockton also called local TV broadcasts of the Oakland Athletics. From 2007 to 2013, Stockton called postseason Major League Baseball games on TBS. In 2007, he partnered with Ron Darling to call the National League Division Series for the network. In 2008, he called the AL Central tiebreaker game with Darling and Harold Reynolds, followed by the NLDS with Darling and Tony Gwynn. In 2009, he teamed with Bob Brenly to call the NLDS for TBS, and the two have worked together for the NLDS every year since until 2014, when TBS began carrying only two LDS, rotating between AL/NL each year. (TBS and Fox began splitting the LDS from 2014 on.) TBS was previously the exclusive home of the LDS from 2007 to 2013. Stockton split play-by-play duties during the 2010 regular season on TBS with NBA on TNT studio host Ernie Johnson Jr. and Milwaukee Brewers announcer Brian Anderson. In 2011, he partnered with Ron Darling and John Smoltz to call Game 5 of National League Division Series between the St. Louis Cardinals and Philadelphia Phillies for TBS as his normal partner Brenly was away at a family event. After 2013, Stockton focused mainly on calling NFL games on Fox before retiring in 2021.

Over the course of the 1990s, Jack Buck decided to reduce his schedule to calling only Cardinals home games (or 81 games a year, unless there was a special occurrence). Health concerns obviously could have played a factor in this, as Buck suffered from such ailments as Parkinson's disease, diabetes, requiring a pacemaker, cataracts, sciatica, and vertigo. Buck once joked, "I wish I'd get Alzheimer's, then I could forget I've got all the other stuff." In 1998, the Cardinals dedicated a bust of Buck that showed him smiling with a hand cupping his left ear. In 1999, he lent his name to a restaurant venture called J. Buck's, with the restaurant's name being shared with son Joe and daughter Julie. One of Buck's final public appearances was on September 17, 2001, at Busch Memorial Stadium in St. Louis. It was the first night that Major League Baseball resumed after the terrorist attacks of September 11. Although looking rather frail (Buck at the time was sick with lung cancer) and struggling to maintain his composure (Buck was obviously showing the signs of Parkinson's disease as well), Buck stirred emotions by reading a patriotic-themed poem during the pregame ceremonies. He concluded by silencing critics who thought baseball had come back too soon: "I don't know about you, but as for me, the question has already been answered: Should we be here? Yes!" Jack Buck died on June 18, 2002, in St. Louis's Barnes-Jewish Hospital from a combination of illnesses. He had stayed in the hospital since January 3 of that year to undergo treatment for lung cancer, Parkinson's disease, and to correct an intestinal blockage.

===== Reasons behind monetary losses =====
As previously mentioned, in the end, CBS wound up losing approximately half a billion dollars from their television contract with Major League Baseball. CBS repeatedly asked Major League Baseball for a rebate, however the league was not willing to do this. According to Curt Smith's book The Voice – Mel Allen's Untold Story, one CBS executive wore a St. Louis Cardinals cap at a 1988 Christmas party. However, by 1992, pining to shed baseball, that same executive wore a cap styled "One More Year."

====== Erratic scheduling ======
CBS alienated and confused fans with its sporadic treatment of regular season telecasts. With a sense of true continuity destroyed, fans eventually figured that they could not count on the network to satisfy their needs (thus, poor ratings were a result). CBS televised about 16 regular season Saturday afternoon games (not counting back-up telecasts) which was 14 less than what NBC televised during the previous contract. According to Commissioner Peter Ueberroth, the reason for the reduction in regular season telecasts was in order for teams to sell them locally in order to make a direct profit. CBS used the strategy of broadcasting only a select number of games in order to build a demand in response to supposedly sagging ratings. In theory, the limited regular season package would require the network to sell less advertising during the year so it can charge more for its postseason events.

In response to this, NBC Sports chairman Dick Ebersol grinned "I assume [its] baseball strategy has to be a big disappointment." Counting the All-Star Game, both League Championship Series and the World Series, CBS would have televised just 38 games. This comes on the account of both League Championship Series and the World Series going to a full seven games. Ebersol criticized Peter Ueberroth for negotiating the four-year, $1.06 billion deal with CBS. According to Ebersol, Ueberroth was totally focused on business. Ebersol said "Ueberroth wanted his legacy to be the maximum amount of money. Baseball got this enormous overbid with CBS, coupled with expanding the cable package (on ESPN) from zero to four nights a week. Now, when they find themselves in trouble, they've got no place to expand. There just wasn't a lot of foresight. (Baseball was) just looking for the big score."

In their first year in 1990, CBS Sports had a pretty loaded schedule (much came at the expense of the regular season baseball coverage): the NBA Playoffs (the 1989–90 season marked CBS' final year with the NBA before the over-the-air package moved over to NBC), College World Series, and college football (like the NBA, CBS would lose the College Football Association (CFA) package soon after being awarded the Major League Baseball contract).

CBS never scheduled baseball on Masters weekend, and seldom on other weekends when it was scheduled to air a PGA Tour event. It was around this time that CBS started expanding its weekend coverage from two hours to three on weekends when there was no baseball, generally from 3:00 to 6:00 p.m. Eastern Time. Most of its baseball dates landed on weeks when other networks covered golf.

Marv Albert, who hosted NBC's baseball pregame show for many years said about CBS' baseball coverage "You wouldn't see a game for a month. Then you didn't know when CBS came back on." When interviewed by The New York Times in August 1989 Albert when asked, agreed with the notion regarding whether the average fan would be shut out of Major League Baseball with only 12 Saturday afternoon games being televised by CBS. He added that the then present major league regime might not have agreed to the same package. According to him, Major League Baseball, similar to the NBA, felt that limited exposure would be better for the game. In Albert's eyes, what CBS was doing was televising the regular season for the delight of carrying the All-Star Game, the playoffs, and the World Series.

Sports Illustrated joked that CBS stood for "Covers Baseball Sporadically". USA Today added that Jack Buck and Tim McCarver "may have to have a reunion before [their] telecast." Mike Lupica of the New York Daily News took it a step further by calling CBS' baseball deal "the Vietnam of sports television."

NBC play-by-play announcer Bob Costas believed that the fact that a large bulk of the regular season coverage ended up on cable (namely, ESPN) beginning in the 1990s was because CBS, when it took over the MLB the television rights from NBC in 1990, did not really want the Saturday Game of the Week. Many fans who did not appreciate CBS' approach to scheduling regular season baseball games believed that they were only truly after the marquee events (namely, the All-Star Game, League Championship Series, and the World Series) in order to sell advertising space (especially the fall entertainment television schedule).

Costas had previously said that he would rather do a Game of the Week that got a 5 rating than host a Super Bowl. "Who thought baseball killed its best way to reach the public? It coulda kept us and CBS – we'd have kept the 'Game' – but it only cared about cash. Whatever else I did, I'd never have left 'Game of the Week' Costas claimed. Meanwhile, Tony Kubek, who teamed with Bob Costas on NBC's baseball telecasts since 1983, said "I can't believe it!" when the subject came about NBC losing baseball for the first time since 1947.

====== The Toronto Blue Jays factor ======
The Toronto Blue Jays were in back-to-back World Series in their championship seasons of 1992 and 1993, as well as the 1991 ALCS. All of CBS's postseason telecasts were simulcast on CTV (which earned CBS approximately $7.5 million per year) in Canada, and received very high ratings north of the border when the Blue Jays were involved. Unfortunately, Canada does not factor in the American Nielsen ratings so as a consequence, CBS earned the lowest U.S. ratings in over 20 years for a World Series (not counting the earthquake interrupted 1989 World Series that was televised by ABC). In any other World Series, viewership would have likely been higher since two American teams would have been involved, to say nothing of spikes to off-the-chart ratings shares in the two competing cities (especially in 1991, when CBS was fortunate to cover the riveting, ultra intense, seven-game battle between the Minnesota Twins and Atlanta Braves). Another reason behind the poor ratings likely had to do with the gradual attrition of the audience for almost all network programming.

====== Unlucky timing ======
The country at the time to the deal was going through a recession. More to the point, in 1990, CBS had asked for about $300,000 for 30-second spots during the World Series, but ended up filling some of its inventory for just $240,000.

CBS could not properly maximize the deal because the Division Series had not yet been created (thus automatically giving CBS more games to carry) and the network did not have a cable outlet to air some of the games (like Fox would eventually have with Fox Sports Net and later FS1). In reality, it competed with ESPN and local broadcasts outside of CBS' broadcast window. More postseason games could have increased the advertising inventory. Both ABC and NBC lost money on their in-season games the last three years of their respective Major League Baseball television contracts (1987–1989).

It should also be noted that CBS' baseball coverage came about just prior to the league making some major changes and innovations, beginning with the mid-1990s. Besides the aforementioned addition of a third round of postseason play called the Division Series, which doubled the number of playoff teams at the time from four to eight, there was also a renaissance in stadium construction. This began in 1992, when Baltimore's Oriole Park at Camden Yards opened. Camden Yards (which was showcased by CBS in their final year with baseball in 1993, when they broadcast the All-Star Game) led to many other fan (and revenue) friendly ballparks being built, and helped expand interest in the game. Instead, CBS was for the most part, handed a declining product that was played in many outdated cookie cutter stadiums.

====== Too much money for one package ======
CBS simply made far too high of a bid (especially for a network that wound up frustrating fans with its lack of regular season coverage) and sustained a shortfall in advertising revenue. Perhaps it is somewhat ironic that back in 1987, CBS Sports president Neal Pilson said of ABC's then ongoing contract with Major League Baseball "Three years ago, we believed ABC's package was overpriced by $175 million. We still believe it's overpriced by $175 million." Whereas from 1976 to 1989, ABC split the television contract with NBC, and therefore logically, split the financial risks, CBS in sharp contrast, aggressively negotiated exclusive postseason rights. In December 1988, Arthur Watson, the president of NBC Sports, criticized CBS saying "We made every effort to keep it. Regretfully, someone bid far more than was responsible. Everybody evaluates things differently. That bid was beyond our reach. Let them explain that bid."

For their inaugural season in 1990, CBS lost between US$75 million and $80 million More to the point, CBS as previously mentioned, took a $55-million after-tax loss for its 1990 playoff and World Series coverage and a $115 million charge against earnings in the fourth quarter for losses during the remaining three years of its $1.06 billion contract.

In 1991, it cost CBS $4.8 million per game in venue productions alone to televise the National League Championship Series, not including studio backup operations or the satellite time needed to transmit the game to New York City for broadcast on their network frequencies. The American League Championship Series (between the Minnesota Twins and Toronto Blue Jays) was another problem because of the tariffs and labor laws they had to endure going into Canada. CBS averaged $1.9 to $2.4 million per regular season game. In return, it was typical for the production cost to double come playoff time. Ultimately, CBS reported a loss of around $169 million in the third quarter of 1991. A drop of in advertiser interest caused revenue from the sale of ads during CBS' baseball telecasts to plummet. All the while, CBS was still contractually obligated to pay Major League Baseball around $260 million a year through 1993.

==== Production overview ====
Back in 1990, when CBS first launched their baseball coverage, Major League Baseball according to CBS Sports senior producer Ed Goren, did not have any atmosphere for discussion on how to improve the game. They retorted to Goran by saying "'This is the national pastime and it's fun the way it is.'" CBS however, would secretly install microphones in bullpens after Major League Baseball turned down their request.

When CBS broadcast the 1990 All-Star Game from Chicago's Wrigley Field, they arrived with four 48-foot vans, a 40-foot trailer, two 60-foot office trailers and a 48-foot maintenance vehicle; 18 cameras positioned around and moving about the ballpark. Rick Kogan of the Chicago Tribune wrote that while CBS' 1990 All-Star Game telecast did not display any grievous gaffes, on almost every level it was workmanlike to the point of being mundane.

After Boston Red Sox pitcher Roger Clemens was pulled out of a 1990 American League Championship Series game and Jim Gray interviewed him on CBS, MLB's public relations department was upset when they found out that CBS intended to run it before the game ended. CBS Sports executive producer Ted Shaker also recalled the time that MLB said that they went too far in regards to CBS experimenting with a tiny camera on an umpire's face mask. Come that year's World Series, CBS announced that they would have 16 cameras and 12 videotape machines ready to cover the moment.

CBS all around, was criticized in 1990 for placing their cameras too tight in certain situations and not giving viewers a greater sense of what it is like to be at the ballpark. Ted Nathanson, who served as a director for NBC's coverage of postseason baseball before CBS bought the rights, said in regards to CBS' World Series coverage "What they are doing is wrong, in my opinion. They are losing the relationship of the action by using too many close-ups when the ball is in play." For example, Nathanson noted that CBS would cover a ground ball to shortstop by first using a camera with a medium view from a high position and then switching to a similar camera position for a tight closeup. According to him "By the time they cut to the close-up of the shortstop, he's thrown the ball already so it looks like a jump-cut. It's impossible for a director to cut that fast. It looks like a glitch." Nathanson suggested that CBS' high camera should have gradually tightened in on the shortstop and then pan toward first base as the ball is thrown. If there was something important to be shown in close-up, they would have it on replay.

Nathanson also criticized camera work in regards to when the ball was in the outfield and runners were circling the bases. He said that "They cut to the baserunners and they are not getting the relationship of the ball being fielded and thrown to the bases. If you are not a TV director, you don't know exactly what's wrong, but you know something is not quite right." Harry Coyle, who was NBC's top baseball director from 1947-1988 and cited as writing the book on how to show baseball on television, agreed with Nathanson about the camera close-ups, but he thought that the overall effort has been good. Coyle said that CBS got in too tight once in a while. His premise had always been to follow the ball. But, on the whole, Coyle gave CBS high marks. He said that they were lucky they got the playoffs to do first so it gave them a lot of experience for the World Series.

While Arne Harris, who produced and directed 150 Chicago Cubs games a season since 1964 for WGN Television, said that he had no problem with tight closeups, he still felt that CBS had trouble getting into the flow of the game. According to Harris, baseball is the toughest sport to cover because two things happen at the same time. The ball is in the hands of the defense and the runner is moving in a different part of the field. Harris added that he knew that CBS got some problems, but it is all a matter of experience.

For the 1991 postseason, CBS announced that they would be using up to 11 cameras in the League Championship Series and 14 for the World Series. According to producer Ric LaCivita, CBS' production division in its entirety had been impacted by a recession. So they had to do a telecast with less. To give you a better idea, during the 1991 regular season, CBS would've been unable to use a super-slow-motion camera behind home plate unlike during the League Championship Series and World Series. According to director Bob Fishman, the $250,000 camera (which was capable of capturing 90 frames per second) and tape machine that created the shots were a luxury item. Therefore, Game 1 of the American League Championship Series would mark the first time that they would be using it on baseball all year. It during the 1991 World Series that CBS unveiled Supervision, which was device that that used animation to show the flight and speed of a pitch.

In conjunction with Super Bowl XXVI on January 26, 1992, CBS unveiled a new network-wide graphics package for its sports coverage. With a few minor tweaks, the red, white, and blue graphic displays stayed in place until 1996, when CBS rolled out a new orange and yellow package.

CBS was cited for failing to show Dwight Smith's game-winning double for the Chicago Cubs in their 1992 baseball opener on April 18 against the St. Louis Cardinals. During that same telecast, the camera was on St. Louis trainer camera was on Gene Gieselmann long before analyst Tim McCarver said his name. Meanwhile, the Cardinals' batting order was presented for the bottom of the first inning—a different version than had been presented a half-inning earlier. Play-by-play announcer Sean McDonough however, presented the new lineup without acknowledging it had changed.

During an interview with Richard Sandomir of the New York Times on July 14, 1992, Ric LaCivita not only previewed what CBS had in store for their upcoming broadcast of that year's All-Star Game from San Diego, which would feature 16 cameras, imbedded in the first base bag (which would allow viewers to be able to see the runner dive back to the bag), and two in blimps, but responded to the various criticisms that CBS received concerning their postseason coverage from the year prior.

On the argument that CBS overused replays, including as many as 133 in Game 6 of the 1991 National League Championship Series, LaCivita said "The number of replays has nothing to do with how you replay. You could use five or 500 and be right. . . . Replays re-create a play or keep the viewer's attention from going forward to something else. Viewers can't appreciate everything until the replays are over. If it's an ordinary replay, you don't replay it." When asked about why CBS cut to a tight, low first-base camera, rather than a higher, more inclusive shot, to cover Mark Lemke of the Atlanta Braves eluding Minnesota Twins catcher Brian Harper's tag to end Game 4 of the World Series, LaCivita said "Joe Aceti"—the director -- "made the right cut. Jack Buck said the game was over. Joe made his decision to cover him coming low across the plate. The mistake started with the call. To this day, the executive producer"—Ted Shaker -- "and I disagreed. You saw it from five different angles until we could identify where Harper's elbow was." As for the criticism from Harry Coyle about over-replays and dubious angles, LaCivita responded by saying "We've had extraordinary coverage of difficult plays that I'm not sure Mr. Coyle would have had. I don't know if they would have had the Lonnie Smith play in Game 7"—in which he was decoyed by the Twins' Chuck Knoblauch -- "because their cameras covered the ball and ours cover the baserunners. Those guys from the 50's weren't risk-takers. I'm a risk-taker."

When assessing CBS' coverage of the 1992 postseason, Jerry Trecker of the Hartford Courant wrote that their baseball coverage was at its best pictorially. Trecker said that the usage of close-ups, although criticized in some quarters, was powerful and conveyed the game's tense moments better than any turn of an announcer's phrase. He went further by saying that a better selection of replays, including a judicious use of super slow-motion views, had elevated the network's coverage since it struggled in the first year of their contract. Trecker also made note that even though CBS had finally developed a fine sense of the rhythm of baseball come 1992, the network still occasionally spent too much time on irrelevant crowd shots. Not only that, but CBS in Trecker's eyes, didn't seem confident enough to let Sean McDonough and booth partner Tim McCarver roam and ramble through the game. Instead, there were too many graphics that had to be explained and too many "little notes" that somebody thought are important.

Whereas CBS used six cameras for their regular season coverage by 1993, they planned on using 13 for that year's All-Star Game in Baltimore. CBS also planned to take advantage of the remote camera atop the Baltimore & Ohio Warehouse at Camden Yards, that provided panoramic views on the Orioles' games that were broadcast on Home Team Sports. Producer Bob Dekas even wanted to put microphones on All-Star managers Cito Gaston of the American League and Bobby Cox of the National League. The audio wouldn't be live, but CBS still had to gain permission from Major League Baseball.

Sonny Dearth of the Daily Press wrote that while CBS' coverage of the 1993 baseball playoffs was insightful and generally good, he did note that the camera from center field and the one from high above the plate often didn't agree on whether some pitches were balls or strikes, thus confusing the viewer. Dearth also wondered why the director had to show Philadelphia Phillies first basemen John Kruk's ripped pants (with the camera focused below the belt) so many times in Game 6 of the National League Championship Series.

Prior to the start of the 1993 World Series, CBS announced that they would use 14 cameras to cover the Series, including a controversial one located above the plate that was intended on providing excellent shots of the strike zone. Before Game 6 of the NLCS, CBS had discussions with National League president Bill White, who asked the network to only use the camera "judiciously." This was after White had been approached by the Major League Umpires Association, which said the camera was being used to second-guess and "show up" the plate umpires' calls of balls and strikes.

In 2020, Ed Goren said to the New York Business Journal that in the four years that Major League Baseball was on CBS, the attitude of baseball was that they were America's game. They however according to Goren, lacked innovation; they fought innovation. By the time that Fox came on board in 1996, part of what they were looking for was innovation. Therefore, among the immediate changes Fox brought were the FoxBox, which showed the score, the runners on base and the count at all times; frequent and extreme close ups of players; and the use of a hard-rock, guitar-heavy theme music.

=== Joint bid with Turner Sports ===
During the 2011 Major League Baseball season, CBS broadcast two Turner Sports-produced studio specials under the CBS Sports Spectacular branding, including the MLB Midseason Report on July 2, 2011, and the postseason preview MLB 2011: Down the Stretch on September 24. Both specials featured the MLB on TBS studio panel of Matt Winer, Dennis Eckersley, Cal Ripken Jr. and David Wells.

In August 2012, The New York Times reported that a Turner/CBS "alliance" was among the bidders for MLB's main television package currently held by Fox (including the Saturday "Game of the Week", All-Star Game, one League Championship Series, and the World Series, along with the possibility of combining it with TBS's current Division Series and LCS package) beginning in the 2014 season, building upon their recent acquisition of joint rights to the NCAA Division I men's basketball tournament. It was suggested that CBS's involvement would have likely been limited to marquee events such as the All-Star Game and World Series, with all other games exclusive to Turner channels. MLB ultimately renewed with Fox Sports and Turner Sports through the 2021 season.

In 2026, CBS's current parent company Paramount Skydance acquired Warner Bros. Discovery, which placed CBS Sports and what is now TNT Sports under common ownership. TNT Sports was brought under CBS Sports' president David Berson, and is expected to be amalgamated into the division in the future. It was reported following the sale's completion that Skydance was exploring whether any of TNT Sports' existing properties (including TBS's MLB coverage, as well as the NHL on TNT) could be given broadcast television presences on CBS in the future (either via a move exclusively to the network, or a simulcasting arrangement), although these options may be limited due to the division's contracts, as well as carriage agreements which may contractually guarantee that certain events will be televised exclusively by WBD cable networks.

== Major League Baseball coverage on CBS' owned-and-operated television stations ==
Team	Stations	Years
Baltimore Orioles	WJZ-TV 13	1954
Boston Braves	WBZ-TV 4	1948–1949
Boston Red Sox	WBZ-TV 4	1948–1954
Brooklyn Dodgers	WCBS-TV 2	1946–1949
New York Yankees	WCBS-TV 2	2002–2004
Oakland Athletics	KPIX-TV 5	1975–1981; 1985–1992
Philadelphia Athletics	WPTZ 3 (later KYW-TV)	1947–1954
Pittsburgh Pirates	KDKA-TV 2	1958–1995

WBZ-TV has aired local sporting events over the years, that have originated either in-house, or through NBC or CBS. Besides the Braves (from 1948 until the team moved to Milwaukee before the 1953 season) and the Red Sox (1948–1957, 1972–1974, and a handful of games in 2003 and 2004, along with certain games aired nationally on NBC from 1948 to 1989).

As previously mentioned, as an ABC station, WJZ-TV broadcast limited Baltimore Orioles games via ABC's MLB broadcast contract from 1976 to 1989.

During the 1980s, KPIX was the flagship station for the Oakland Athletics baseball team (at times preempting or delaying CBS network shows for the live broadcasts), before the A's broadcasts moved to then-NBC affiliate KRON-TV the early 1990s; select A's and San Francisco Giants games were aired on KPIX from 1990 to 1993 as part of CBS' MLB broadcast contract.

In 2002, WCBS-TV acquired the over-the-air rights to New York Yankees baseball games, replacing Fox owned-and-operated station WNYW. The games, produced by the new YES Network, remained in the station until the 2004 season; the rights moved to UPN affiliate (now MyNetworkTV owned-and-operated station) WWOR-TV beginning in 2005. It also aired any Yankee or Met games as part of CBS' MLB broadcast contract from 1990 to 1993.

Records
Preceded by None	Major League Baseball network broadcast partner 1947–1949 with NBC (1947–1949) with DuMont (1947–1949)	Succeeded by NBC
Preceded by ABC and NBC	Major League Baseball network broadcast partner 1955–1965 with NBC (1955–1965) with ABC (1959–1961 and 1965)	Succeeded by NBC
Preceded by ABC and NBC	Major League Baseball network broadcast partner 1990–1993	Succeeded by The Baseball Network (ABC and NBC)
