= Jim Kaat =

American baseball player and analyst (born 1938)

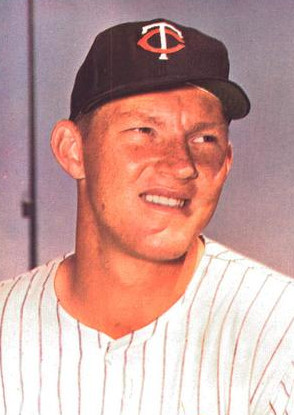
- Kaat with the Minnesota Twins in 1965
- Pitcher
- Born: November 7, 1938 (age 88); Zeeland, Michigan, U.S.
- Batted: Left Threw: Left

MLB debut
- August 2, 1959, for the Washington Senators

Last MLB appearance
- July 1, 1983, for the St. Louis Cardinals

MLB statistics
- Win–loss record: 283–237
- Earned run average: 3.45
- Strikeouts: 2,461
- Stats at Baseball Reference

Teams
- Washington Senators / Minnesota Twins (1959–1973); Chicago White Sox (1973–1975); Philadelphia Phillies (1976–1979); New York Yankees (1979–1980); St. Louis Cardinals (1980–1983)

Career highlights and awards
- 3× All Star (1962², 1966, 1975); World Series champion (1982); 16× Gold Glove Award (1962–1977); AL wins leader (1966); Minnesota Twins No. 36 retired; Minnesota Twins Hall of Fame

Member of the National

Baseball Hall of Fame
- Induction: 2022
- Vote: 75%
- Election method: Golden Days Era Committee

James Lee Kaat (/kɑːt/ KAHT; born November 7, 1938), nicknamed "Kitty", is an American former professional baseball player and television sports commentator. A left-handed pitcher, he played Major League Baseball (MLB) for the Washington Senators / Minnesota Twins (1959–1973), Chicago White Sox (1973–1975), Philadelphia Phillies (1976–1979), New York Yankees (1979–1980), and St. Louis Cardinals (1980–1983) for a then-record 25 years.

Kaat was an All-Star for three seasons and a Gold Glove winner for 16 straight seasons. He was the American League (AL) leader in shutouts (5) in 1962, and the AL leader in wins (25) and complete games (19) in 1966. In accumulating his 283 career wins, he had three 20-win seasons. Kaat won 190 games with the Senators/Twins (all but one win coming with the latter team), second most in club history and most since the team moved to Minnesota; he also has the most Gold Glove Awards of any Twin with 12.

After a brief stint as a pitching coach for the Cincinnati Reds, Kaat became a sportscaster and for the next 22 years, calling games for the New York Yankees and the Minnesota Twins. Following a brief retirement in 2006, he called Pool D for the 2009 World Baseball Classic in Puerto Rico, games for NESN in 2009, and worked for the MLB Network from its inception in 2009 until August 2022.

Kaat was elected to the National Baseball Hall of Fame by the Golden Days Era Committee in 2022.

== Early life ==
Kaat hails from Dutch ancestry. He was the youngest of four children born to John and Nancy (Bosma) Kaat. He attended the schools of Zeeland, Michigan, and is a 1956 graduate of Zeeland High School. During his high school years, he excelled at basketball and baseball.

Kaat attended Hope College in Holland, Michigan, and pitched for the school's Flying Dutchmen baseball team, before being signed by the Washington Senators as an amateur free agent in 1957.

== Baseball career ==
Kaat spent all of 1957 and 1958 in the minor leagues before breaking into the majors in 1959 with the Washington Senators. After pitching in 16 games spread out over the next two seasons, Kaat became a permanent member of the pitching staff when the Senators franchise moved west in 1961 to become the Minnesota Twins. On July 24, 1963, Kaat threw a complete-game shutout and hit a home run for a 5–0 Twins win over the Indians. Minnesota pitchers have only homered in the same game in which they threw a shutout three times, and Kaat did so twice, a second time on October 1, 1970.

Kaat was a member of the 1965 Twins team that won the American League pennant. He started three games in the 1965 World Series against the Los Angeles Dodgers, matching up with Sandy Koufax on all three occasions, including a complete game victory in Game 2.

His best season was in 1966, when he led the league with 25 wins and 19 complete games. He finished fifth in the MVP voting and was named the American League Pitcher of the Year by The Sporting News. The National League's Sandy Koufax won the Cy Young Award by a unanimous vote; it was the last year in which only one award was given for all of Major League Baseball. Although his 1967 season was somewhat of a let down compared to 1966 (he finished 16–13 with a 3.04 ERA), he went on a tear in September and nearly pitched the Twins to another World Series appearance — cruising to a 7–0 record with a 1.51 ERA and 65 strikeouts in 65 2/3 innings pitched. However Kaat sustained a season-ending arm injury in the third inning of the second-to-last game and the Boston Red Sox swept the final two to win the American League pennant.

In 1974, he went 21–13, setting a record for largest gap between 20-win seasons at eight, a mark that stood until broken by David Cone in 1998. Kaat recorded his third 20-win season in 1975, when he posted a 20–14 record and 3.11 ERA while throwing 303.2 innings at the age of 36; an All-Star and Gold Glove winner, he finished fourth in the Cy Young Award voting.

Kaat was primarily a front of the rotation starting pitcher until 1979 (when he turned 40 in his 21st season), twice leading the AL in starts, with 42 in 1965 and 41 in 1966. He became a relief pitcher that season, split between the Philadelphia Phillies and the New York Yankees, following three up and down years in the Phillies rotation (where he'd arrived in an off-season trade from the Chicago White Sox with Mike Buskey in exchange for Dick Ruthven, Alan Bannister and Roy Thomas on December 10, 1975). After just three games split between starting and relieving in Philadelphia, he was purchased by New York, which used him 40 times, 39 in relief. Transitioning into a specialist short reliever, Kaat pitched four more years and appeared in 180 games, 167 out of the bullpen. He earned his only World Series ring with the St. Louis Cardinals in 1982, working in four games in relief in the 1982 World Series.

Kaat appeared in 898 games, started 625, and threw for 4,530.1 innings. He was an All-Star three times (1962, 1966, 1975), and won the Gold Glove Award for defensive skill a record 16 consecutive times (1962–1977). His record for career Gold Gloves by a pitcher later fell to Greg Maddux's 18. Kaat used the same baseball glove for 15 seasons.

In 1983, he became the last major league player to have played in the 1950s and the last player for the original Washington Senators to retire. Kaat is one of only 29 players in baseball history to date to have appeared in Major League games in four decades. At the time of his retirement, Kaat's 25-year career was the longest of any pitcher in major league history. He is now third all-time, behind Nolan Ryan's 27 years and Tommy John's 26.

Kaat also set a 20th-century record by playing during the administrations of seven U.S. Presidents — Dwight D. Eisenhower, John F. Kennedy, Lyndon B. Johnson, Richard M. Nixon, Gerald R. Ford, Jr., Jimmy Carter, and Ronald Reagan. This mark was equaled by Nolan Ryan when he retired after the 1993 season, the first year of the administration of Bill Clinton.

=== Career statistics ===
Category	W	L	PCT	ERA	G	GS	CG	SHO	SV	IP	H	R	ER	HR	BB	SO	WP	HBP	Ref.
Total	283	237	.544	3.45	898	625	180	31	17	4530.1	4620	2038	1738	395	1083	2461	128	122	

As a hitter, he was better than average, recording a career .185 batting average (232-for-1251) with 117 runs, 44 doubles, 16 home runs, 106 Runs batted in, and 63 walks.

=== Post-retirement ===
==== Coaching ====
Upon retirement as a player, Kaat served a short stint with the Cincinnati Reds as the club's pitching coach. When Pete Rose took over in 1984 as the Reds' player/manager, he made good on a promise to Kaat, his former Philadelphia Phillies teammate, and hired the former hurler for his coaching staff. Kaat would coach part of the 1984 season and all of 1985, a year in which he guided Cincinnati rookie Tom Browning to a 20–9 record. "At least I can say I had a 20-game winner every year I coached," Kaat used to joke.

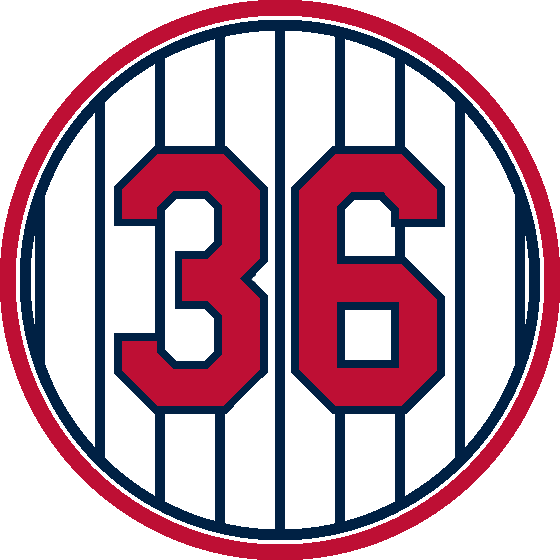
Jim Kaat's number 36 was retired by the Minnesota Twins in 2022.

==== Special assistant ====
In January 2018, Jim Kaat was hired by the Minnesota Twins as a Special Assistant. Kaat's role is "to help assist Twins president Dave St. Peter in business, marketing and community initiatives".

== Post-baseball activities ==
=== Broadcasting career ===
==== Early days ====
As stated during the television broadcast of the seventh game of the 1965 World Series, Kaat was a broadcaster on local radio in Minnesota. Following his stint as pitching coach, he went into sports broadcasting full-time starting out as the chief baseball correspondent for Good Morning America from 1984 to 1985.

His first full-time broadcasting job was with the Yankees was during the 1986 season, where he called around 100 games for WPIX. He only lasted one season as the Yankees replaced him with Billy Martin, who was between managing stints and who was purposely brought in to second-guess Lou Piniella. In between broadcasting stints for the Yankees, he spent six years (1988–1993) as an announcer for the Twins.

In 1986, Kaat was the backup announcer for NBC Sports' coverage of baseball with Phil Stone (for the April 19 Minnesota–California contest) and Jay Randolph (the June 14 Cincinnati–Atlanta contest). In April 1987 Kaat served as an announcer of Atlanta Braves broadcasts on TBS. In 1988, he covered the College World Series and the MLB playoffs and World Series for ESPN and also served as an analyst for NBC's coverage of the 1988 Summer Olympics.

==== 1990s ====
From 1990–1993, Kaat served as an analyst for CBS television, teaming with Dick Stockton and then, Greg Gumbel (for whom Kaat also called the College World Series with for CBS from 1990–1993) in 1993. Besides calling four American League Championship Series for CBS (1990–1993), Kaat served as a field reporter with Lesley Visser (1990–1992) and Andrea Joyce (1991) during the World Series. Kaat also covered three World Series Trophy presentations for CBS (1990–1992). Over the course of Game 2 of the 1992 ALCS, Kaat was stricken with a bad case of laryngitis. As a result, Johnny Bench had to come over from the CBS Radio booth and finish the game with Dick Stockton as a "relief analyst". There was talk that if Kaat's laryngitis did not get better, Don Drysdale was going to replace Kaat on TV for Game 3 and possibly the rest of ALCS while Bench would continue to work on CBS Radio. In 1993, he filled in for Lesley Visser until late August as CBS' primary field reporter after she suffered injuries in a bizarre jogging accident in New York City's Central Park.

In 1994, he was the lead analyst on Baseball Tonight for ESPN's coverage of Major League Baseball. In 1995, he was nominated for a New York Emmy Award for "On Camera Achievement". Also in 1995, Kaat called the American League playoffs with Brent Musburger for ABC/The Baseball Network including the Yankees–Seattle Mariners Division Series and the American League Championship Series.

He served his second stint as an announcer for Yankees games on the MSG Network/YES Network (1995–2006), where his straight-shooting style was much in the mode of former Yankees broadcasters Tony Kubek and Bill White. In addition, he was on the team which won the "Outstanding Live Sports Coverage – Single Program" New York Emmy for covering Dwight Gooden's no-hitter on May 14, 1996, and David Wells's perfect game on May 17, 1998.

==== 21st century ====
Towards the end of his second stint with the Yankees, his workload decreased. In 2006, he only broadcast 65 games. Despite his decreased workload, Kaat won another Emmy for on-air achievement in 2006.

In an on-air broadcast on September 10, 2006, with booth partner Ken Singleton, Kaat acknowledged his plan to end his broadcasting career. His final appearance in the booth was to be a Yankee–Red Sox game on September 15, 2006 (Kaat was also set to throw out the first pitch). However, the game was postponed due to rain. Kaat later announced that he was going to record a special farewell message to the fans, but would not return for any additional broadcasts. However, the following day, Kaat did announce one full inning of the first game of Saturday September 16's doubleheader on Fox along with Tim McCarver and Josh Lewin. During that Fox telecast he was able to say goodbye to the Yankee fans, an opportunity that the previous night's rainout had deprived him of doing on the YES Network.

After his retirement from calling Yankees games full-time, Kaat has made several single-game appearances on various networks. Kaat made a special one-inning appearance, during the third inning, on the YES Network on June 30, 2008, during a Yankees–Rangers game. He also appeared live via telephone, during a Yankees–Blue Jays game on July 13, 2008, to discuss the recent death of Bobby Murcer. He joined the TBS Sunday Baseball team, for a single game on May 4, 2008.

In 2009, Kaat joined the recently launched MLB Network as a color commentator for their MLB Network Showcase series. Kaat also writes a weekly on-line blog for the Yankees (YES) Network, Kaat's Korner, and contributes video blogs and interviews regularly with national and international media outlets. One of the reasons he got back into regular broadcasting was because after his wife died, Tim McCarver and Elizabeth Schumacher, his friend and business manager, urged him to get back into the game. He also called Pool D in Puerto Rico for the 2009 World Baseball Classic games for an international feed.

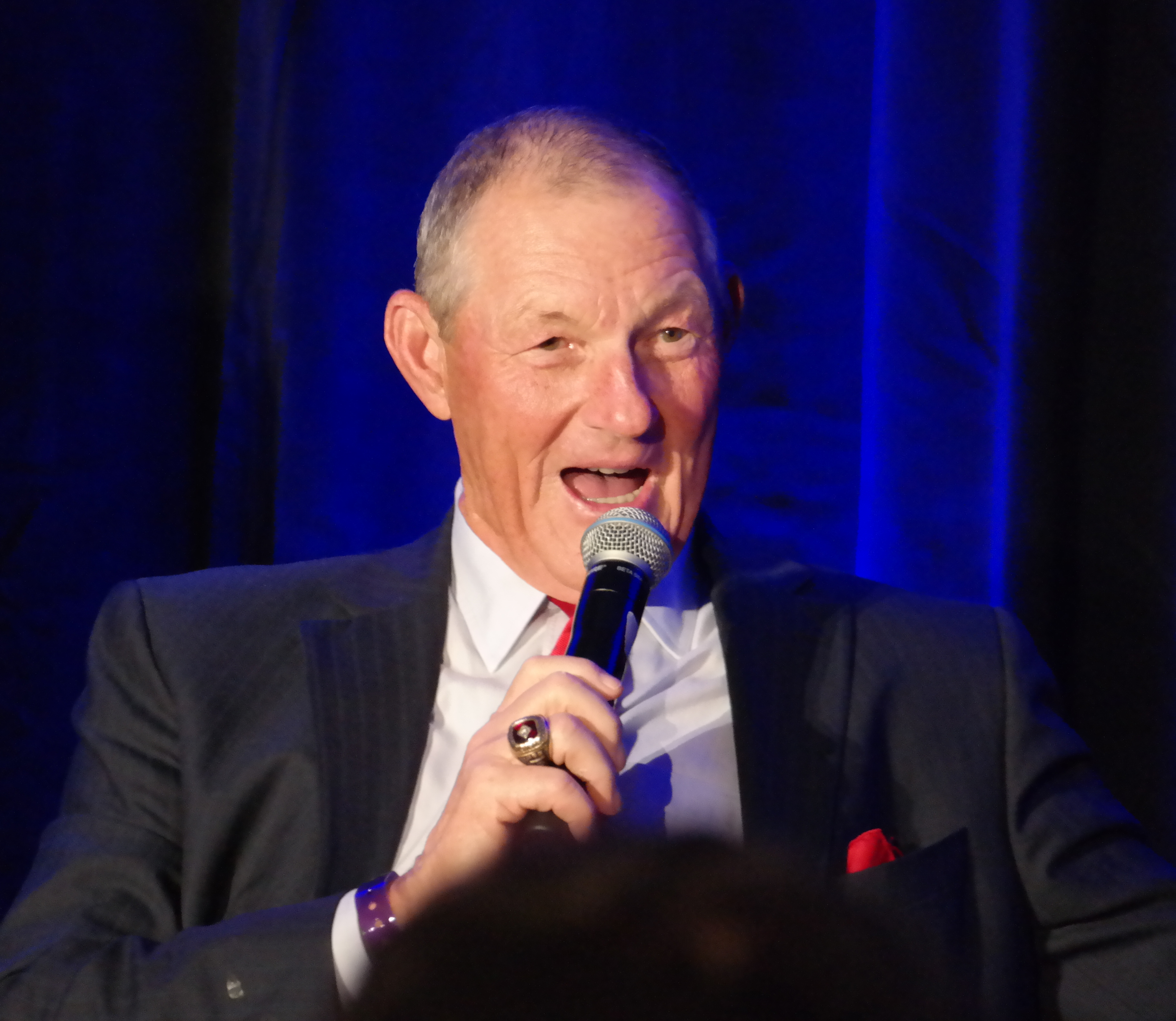
Kaat in 2013

Kaat broadcast the 2021 American League Division Series between the White Sox and Astros for MLB Network. Kaat made headlines when he referred to New York Yankees pitcher Nestor Cortés Jr. as "Nestor the Molester" during a broadcast. The next day, Cortés tweeted about Kaat, "He reached out to me and apologized for his remark last night, but he didn't need to. We all make mistakes and feel 100% there was no malice intended."

After a four decade broadcasting career, Kaat announced his retirement on August 18, 2022, effective after that day's Yankees-Blue Jays game.

==== Broadcasting awards and accolades ====
From 1997 to 2005, Kaat won 7 Emmy Awards for excellence in sports broadcasting:

- 1995–96 New York Emmy Award for 'Outstanding Live Sports Coverage, Single Program, Dwight Gooden's No Hitter', Jim Kaat, Analyst, May 14, 1996, MSG Network
- 1996–97 New York Emmy Award for 'Outstanding Live Sports Coverage, The Battle of New York: Yankees vs. Mets', New York Yankees Baseball, Jim Kaat, Announcer, June 16, 1997, MSG Network
- 1997–98 New York Emmy Award for 'Outstanding Live Sports Coverage, Single Program, Professional; David Wells Perfect Game, New York Yankees Baseball, Jim Kaat Commentator, MSG Network
- 1997–98 New York Emmy Award for 'Outstanding Live Sports Coverage, Series, Professional', New York Yankees Baseball, Jim Kaat, Commentator, MSG Network
- 1999–00 New York Emmy Award for 'Outstanding Live Sports Coverage, Series', New York Yankees, Jim Kaat, Announcer, April 13, 1999, MSG Network
- 2004–05 New York Emmy Award for 'On-camera Achievement (Sports): Analysis/Commentary in a Sportscast, Jim Kaat, YES Network;
- 2004–05 New York Emmy Award for 'Live Sports Coverage: Single Program (Professional)', New York Yankees Baseball – 2005 Opening Night, Jim Kaat, Talent, YES Network

=== Agent ===
Kaat started a sports management company, Southpaw Enterprises, Inc., representing pitchers.

=== Author ===
Kaat wrote the best-selling book, Still Pitching: Musings from the Mound and the Microphone, in 2003. He co-wrote If These Walls Could Talk: New York Yankees: Stories from the New York Yankees Dugout, Locker Room,and Press Box with Greg Jennings in 2015.

In May 2022, Kaat released his third book, Good as Gold: My Eight Decades in Baseball.

== Personal life ==
Kaat married his first wife, Julie Moore, in October 1959, and divorced in 1975. His marriage to his second wife, Linda, also ended in divorce. His third wife, MaryAnn, died in July 2008 after 22 years of marriage. Kaat created a memorial fund in her name to put lights on the baseball fields in his hometown of Zeeland, Michigan, in her honor. Kaat and MaryAnn have four children and six grandchildren. Kaat married his fourth wife, Margie, in 2009.

Kaat's grandparents were born in the Netherlands. He is from Zeeland, a major farming area, where he grew up. Kaat said he would have played for the Netherlands national baseball team if the World Baseball Classic existed during his career. Along with his former Twins teammate, the Utrecht-born Bert Blyleven, they were known for saying, "If you ain't Dutch, you ain't much."

During the offseason, Kaat resides in Stuart, Florida.

== Honors and awards ==
Kaat was inducted into the Minnesota Twins Hall of Fame in 2001,and had his number 36 retired by the franchise on July 16, 2022.

=== Baseball Hall of Fame ===
In 2014, Kaat appeared for the second time as a candidate on the National Baseball Hall of Fame's Golden Era Committee election ballot for possible Hall of Fame consideration for 2015, which required 12 votes. He missed getting inducted by two votes. He was elected to the Hall of Fame on December 5, 2021, and was formally enshrined on July 24, 2022.

=== Broadcasting awards ===
Kaat has earned numerous broadcasting awards in a career that began in the 1960s and spanned until 2022, serving as a sportscaster from the 1980s on.

== See also ==
- List of Gold Glove Award winners at pitcher
- List of Major League Baseball annual wins leaders
- List of Major League Baseball annual shutout leaders
- List of Major League Baseball career wins leaders
- List of Major League Baseball career hit batsmen leaders
- List of Major League Baseball career strikeout leaders
- List of Major League Baseball all-time leaders in home runs by pitchers
- List of Major League Baseball players who played in four decades

Media offices
Preceded by Tony Kubek	Secondary color commentator, Major League Baseball Game of the Week; 1990–1993	Succeeded by Bob Brenly
Preceded by Joe Morgan	Secondary color commentator, Major League Baseball on ABC; 1995	Succeeded by Last
