= College World Series on CBS =

Collegiate baseball telecast

- Also known as: CBS Sports NCAA Championships
- Genre: College baseball game telecasts
- Starring: Gary Apple; Joe Carter; Rick Cerone; John Dockery; Ron Fraser; Steve Garvey; Greg Gumbel; Armen Keteyian; Jerry Kindall; Ray Knight; Fred Lynn; Sean McDonough; Rick Monday; Joe Morgan; Brent Musburger; Michele Tafoya; Jeff Torborg; Lesley Visser
- Narrated by: William (Rosko) Mercer; Don Robertson
- Country of origin: United States
- Original language: English
- No. of seasons: 15

Production
- Camera setup: Multi-camera
- Running time: 180 minutes or until game ended
- Production company: CBS Sports

Original release
- Network: CBS
- Release: June 11, 1988 – June 22, 2002

Related
- Major League Baseball on CBS; CBS Sports Spectacular

From 1988–2002, CBS Sports televised a portion of the annual College World Series.

== History ==
From 1988-1990, CBS only televised the championship game. From 1991 until the end of their coverage in 2002, CBS televised one game on the first Saturday of the World Series besides the championship game.

=== Format change ===
Prior to 1988, the College World Series was a pure double-elimination event. Beginning in 1988, the tournament was divided into two four-team double-elimination brackets, with the survivors of each bracket playing in a single championship game. The single-game championship was made for broadcast television, with the final game on CBS on Saturday afternoon. CBS paid approximately $500,000 for the broadcasting rights to the championship game.

=== The end of CBS' coverage ===
In 2003, the tournament was shifted entirely to cable on ESPN, which had begun covering all of the other games of the CWS since 1982 (and a partial schedule since 1980). The championship final became a best-of-three series between the two bracket winners, with games scheduled for Saturday, Sunday, and Monday evenings.

In 2015, college baseball returned to CBS Sports in the form of a multi-year agreement between the American Athletic Conference and CBS Sports Network. Under the terms of the package, CBS Sports Network would air three Houston Baseball games in 2015, as well as the first two contests of the 2015 American Athletic Conference Baseball Championship. Carter Blackburn provided play-by-play for all seven games of the package, while analyst duties would be handled Darryl Hamilton and Ray King along with Brandon Tierney.

== Commentators ==
=== 1980s ===
Year	Play-by-play	Color commentator(s)
1988	Brent Musburger	Rick Monday
1989	Brent Musburger	Joe Morgan

=== 1990s ===
Year	Play-by-play	Color commentator(s)
1990	Greg Gumbel	Jim Kaat
1991	Greg Gumbel	Jim Kaat
1992	Greg Gumbel	Jim Kaat
1993	Greg Gumbel	Jim Kaat
1994	Greg Gumbel	Jeff Torborg
1995	Sean McDonough	Jeff Torborg
1996	Sean McDonough	Steve Garvey
1997	Sean McDonough	Fred Lynn
1998	Sean McDonough	Fred Lynn
1999	Sean McDonough	Joe Carter

=== 2000s ===
Year	Play-by-play	Color commentator(s)
2000	Greg Gumbel	Jerry Kindall
2001	Greg Gumbel	Ray Knight
2002	Greg Gumbel	Rick Cerone
