= Andrea Joyce =

American sportscaster (born 1954)

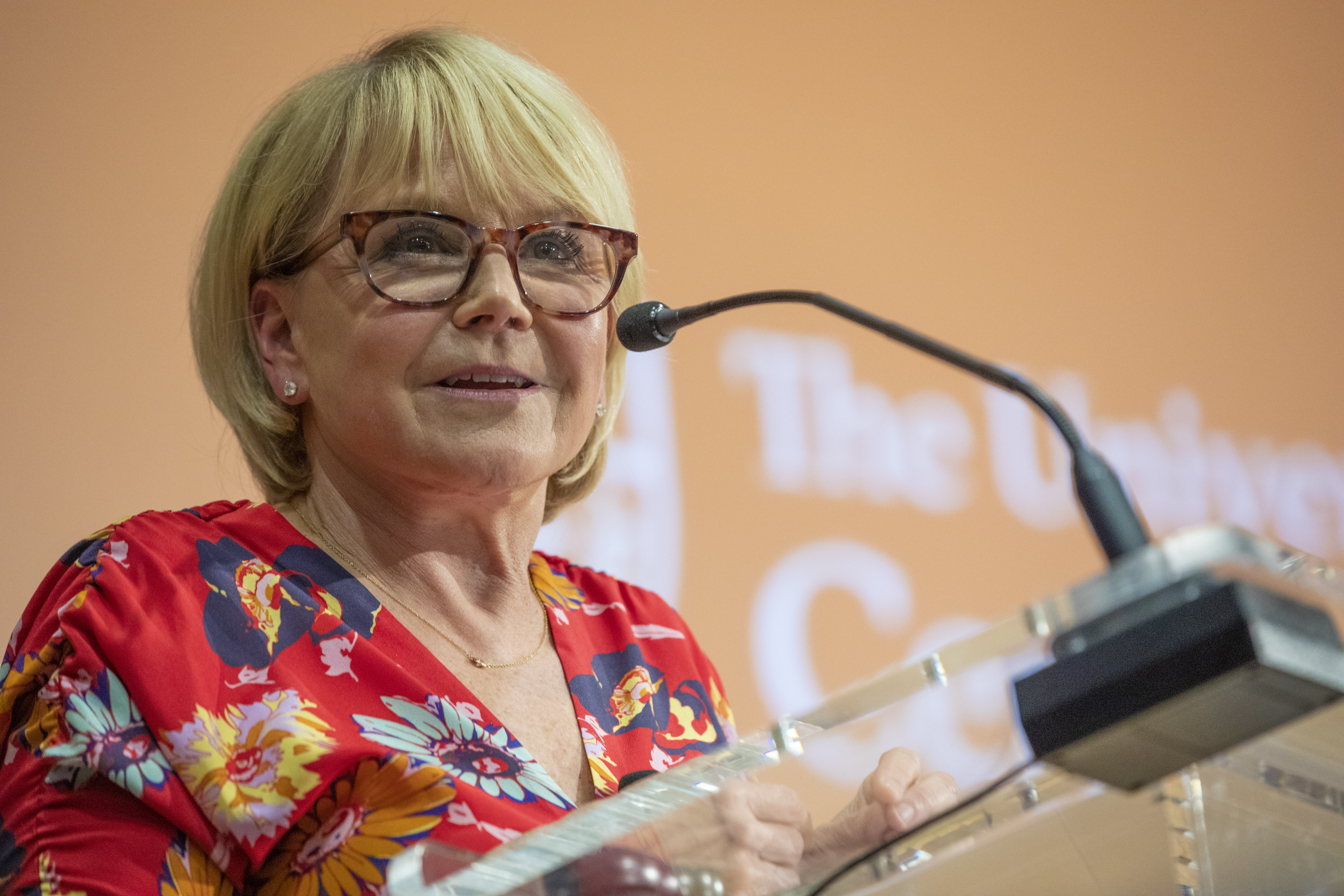
- Joyce in 2017
- Born: Andrea Joyce Kuslits; August 17, 1954 (age 71)
- Occupation: Sportscaster
- Spouse: Harry Smith
- Children: 2

Andrea Joyce Kuslits (born August 17, 1954), better known as Andrea Joyce, is an American retired sportscaster who worked for NBC Sports after working 10 years with CBS Sports.

== Education ==
Joyce graduated from the University of Michigan in 1976.

== Career ==
Her work in local television included a stint as the weekend sports anchor for WFAA-TV in Dallas in 1987 and as a news anchor and field reporter for KMGH-TV in Denver. She also worked as a news anchor for KTVH-TV in Wichita, Kansas (now KWCH-DT). She also worked a stint at Detroit's NBC affiliate WDIV-TV channel 4.

Joyce debuted as a reporter for ESPN at the 1988 Summer Olympics in Seoul. She also covered for ESPN, the NFL draft, and the French Open Tennis Championships.

Prior to joining CBS Sports, Joyce hosted MSG SportsDesk on the Madison Square Garden Network (1988).

=== CBS Sports ===
Joyce joined CBS Sports in August 1989. She made her on-air debut at the 1989 U.S. Open Tennis Championships. She worked three Winter Games for CBS Sports, serving as co-host of the weekend and Opening and Closing Ceremony coverage at the 1994 Lillehammer Games and the 1998 Nagano Games. Joyce served as co-host of the CBS' weekend coverage during the 1992 Albertville Games. While interviewing USA's Donna Weinbrecht, after winning a freestyle skiing-moguls gold medal in 1992, Weinbrecht's mother rushed up (midway through the interview) to her daughter and literally knocked Joyce off the air.

Andrea Joyce replaced Greg Gumbel (who in return, replaced Dick Stockton as the #2 play-by-play man) as studio host for the Major League Baseball games. Joyce would be joined at the anchor desk by Pat O'Brien. She also served as field reporter for the 1991 National League Championship Series and 1991 World Series, and at the 1993 World Series, she became the first woman to co-host the network television coverage for a World Series.

Joyce also hosted CBS' early-round coverage of the 1991 NCAA Division I Men's Basketball Championship; College Football Today (CBS' college football studio show); the NCAA Division I Women's Basketball Championship Final Four and title-game broadcasts from 1991 to 1994; and the 1990 Heisman Trophy Award show. During her ten years at CBS she covered events ranging from the Final Four to the US Open Tennis Championships. She also covered the 1990 NBA Playoffs and figure skating.

Joyce returned to CBS Sports for their pregame coverage of Super Bowl LVIII and on their show We Need to Talk.

=== NBC Sports ===
Joyce joined NBC Sports in 2000 and has served as a reporter on a number of events for NBC, including figure skating and short track speed skating from Turin in 2006; gymnastics and diving from Athens in 2004; speed skating in Salt Lake City at the 2002 Winter Olympics Games; and diving and swimming in Sydney in 2000. She was the only woman to do play-by-play during the 2008 Summer Olympics in Beijing. During that Olympics, she served as the play-by-play woman for rhythmic gymnastics and served as a reporter for gymnastics.

She also served as the play-by-play commentator for rhythmic gymnastics in Athens. In Sydney, Joyce also covered women's soccer and women's water polo, in addition to contributing to the Sports Desk. She served as a reporter during NBC's coverage of the 2000 Olympic Diving Trials and the 2000 Olympic Swimming Trials. She also served as a reporter for NBA on NBC and WNBA on NBC broadcasts. Joyce currently covers gymnastics and figure skating for NBC Sports as well as anchoring the NBC Sports Update.

In 2010, she served as the reporter for short track and figure skating during the 2010 Winter Olympics on NBC. She again served as a figure skating and short track commentator for NBC during the 2026 Winter Olympics and a commentator for the 2026 Winter Paralympics.

== Personal life ==
A member of the Women's Sports Foundation, Joyce has covered a wide variety of sports, including figure skating, boxing, and dog shows.

Joyce has been married to former CBS and NBC reporter Harry Smith, since 1986. The pair met at KMGH in Denver, where they co-anchored the news. They have two sons. They live in New York City. She enjoys jogging and tennis.

== See also ==
- New Yorkers in journalism
