= Pan American Games on television =

Sports broadcast

ABC was the first American television network to broadcast the Pan American Games in 1963, when they devoted one episode of their Wide World of Sports anthology program to the games. They doubled their coverage to two episodes of the show in 1967. CBS then bought the rights to the 1975 and 1979 Games at the same time. Their coverage in 1975 was mainly shown on CBS Sports Spectacular, their equivalent to Wide World of Sports. CBS repeated the process of airing most of its coverage on CBS Sports Spectacular in 1979.

For the 1983 games, CBS aired all of its coverage on weekend afternoons. These games also marked the first of three consecutive hosting assignments of Brent Musburger. CBS endured numerous obstacles in the run up to the games, including missing video tape machines and mobile units, inexperienced technicians from several countries, a last minute disagreement with the host broadcaster that left CBS scrambling to add 5 more cameras to the 3 it planned to use at the opening ceremony, and more. In addition, when a large doping scandal broke out at the games, including the sudden departure of 12 American athletes to avoid drug testing, Musburger made special reports on the scandal during the CBS Morning News and CBS Evening News, as well as during the regularly scheduled coverage.

CBS broadcast its fourth consecutive Pan American Games in 1987 and provided the host feed as well. This would be the last time that CBS would broadcast the games. Brent Musburger as previously alluded to, returned as host.

In 1991, ABC sought the rights to the Pan Am Games in Havana. The negotiations became bogged down in the U.S. embargo against Cuba, which forbade direct payments to Cuba. After a protracted negotiation with the U.S. Justice Department, ABC eventually signed a deal to broadcast the games. The fee was paid indirectly to avoid the embargo. ABC partnered with Ted Turner's TNT cable channel for the Havana games. TNT aired the prime time coverage with Ernie Johnson Jr. as host, while Brent Musburger (who had been fired by CBS in March 1990) anchored ABC's weekend afternoon coverage. This would be the last time the games were broadcast by a major broadcast network in the United States. All coverage since has aired on cable or Spanish-language networks.

== Since 1995 ==
No major U.S. networks covered the 1999 Pan Am Games from Winnipeg, Canada, except for the Spanish-language network Univisión, while newspapers only sent second-string reporters instead and the stories never made front page news. Winnipeg mayor Glen Murray became nationally well known as a result of the Games and thanks to extensive coverage by the CBC, anchored by CBC Sports' Brian Williams.

In the United States, ESPN and ESPN Deportes held the broadcasting rights for the Pan American Games through 2019.

=== 2015 Pam American Games ===
The Canadian Broadcasting Corporation (CBC) served as the host and domestic broadcaster of the 2015 Pan American Games from Toronto; locally, coverage was broadcast in the English and French languages by CBC Television and Ici Radio-Canada Télé, and CBC's website carried 650 hours of online coverage. Pay television rights were sub-licensed to Sportsnet, which aired the football (soccer) tournaments, and a semi-final of the Men's basketball tournament that involved Canada. Spanish language rights were sub-licensed to Telelatino and Univision Canada; the broadcaster collaborated with US Spanish-language rights-holder ESPN Deportes on its own coverage. CBC stated that it was "very happy" with the ratings performance of the Games; primetime coverage averaged around 900,000 to 1 million viewers per night, and the opening ceremonies were seen by 1.93 million viewers across CBC and CBC News Network, with the largest audience being in the Toronto region.

In the United States, ESPN held broadcast rights, with 66 hours of English-language coverage across ESPN and ESPN2, 44 hours on Longhorn Network, 200 hours of Spanish-language coverage on ESPN Deportes, and streaming on WatchESPN. ESPN broadcast from studios at Corus Quay, which was linked to the IBC (and in turn, ESPN's headquarters in Bristol, Connecticut). ESPN and ESPN Deportes used their own hosts, as well of those of CBC, as part of its multi-platform coverage.

Rede Record acquired rights in Brazil, paying a record US$30 million. Other broadcasting deals include Torneos y Competencias sports in Argentina, Claro Sports in Mexico and Latina Televisión in Peru.

=== 2019 and 2023 Pan American Games ===
Mediapro served as host broadcaster for the 2019 Pan American Games from Lima, Peru. The Lima Convention Centre hosted the International Broadcast Centre (IBC). Panam Sports also launched the Panam Sports Channel on its website, which featured supplemental video content from the Games hosted by local personality Alexandra Hörler.

In February 2022, Mediapro reached an agreement to serve as host broadcaster of Santiago 2023; for the first time, every event held across the Pan-American and Parapan American Games will be televised, nearly doubling the hours of coverage that will be available to rightsholders in comparison to 2019. In September 2022, the country's public broadcaster Televisión Nacional de Chile (TVN) reached an agreement to serve as the domestic broadcaster of the Games. In early-2023, the commercial networks Canal 13 and Chilevisión also acquired rights to the Games.

== See also ==
- List of Pan American Games commentators
  - 2007 Pan American Games broadcasters
- List of events broadcast on Wide World of Sports (American TV program)
