= Greg Gumbel =

American sportscaster (1946–2024)

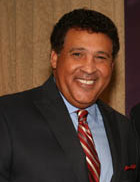
- Gumbel in 2009
- Born: Gregory Girard Gumbel; May 3, 1946; New Orleans, Louisiana, U.S.
- Died: December 27, 2024 (aged 78); Davie, Florida, U.S.
- Education: Loras College (BA)
- Occupation: Sportscaster
- Years active: 1973–2023
- Spouse: Marcy Kaszynski (m. 1976)
- Children: 1
- Relatives: Bryant Gumbel (brother)

Gregory Girard Gumbel (May 3, 1946 – December 27, 2024) was an American television sportscaster. He was best known for his various assignments for CBS Sports (most notably, the National Football League and NCAA basketball). Gumbel became the first African-American announcer to call play-by-play of a major sports championship in the United States when he announced Super Bowl XXXV for the CBS network in 2001. From 1998 through 2023, Gumbel was the studio host for CBS' men's college basketball coverage and was a play-by-play broadcaster for the NFL on CBS.

== Biography ==
=== Early years ===
Gregory Girard Gumbel was born in New Orleans, Louisiana, in 1946, the first child of Rhea Alice (LeCesne) and Richard Dunbar Gumbel, a judge. His paternal great-great-grandfather was a German-Jewish emigrant from the village of Albisheim. As a young man, Gumbel grew up on Chicago's South Side, where he was raised Catholic, attending and graduating from De La Salle Institute. In 1967, Gumbel graduated with a Bachelor of Arts in English from Loras College, where he also played on the baseball team. Gumbel had two sisters, Renee Gumbel-Farrahi and Rhonda Gumbel-Thomas, and a younger brother, Bryant Gumbel, who also pursued a network television broadcasting career.

=== Career ===
In 1973, Gumbel's brother, Bryant, then working as a television sportscaster at KNBC in Los Angeles, informed him that another NBC owned-and-operated station, WMAQ-TV in Chicago, was auditioning for a sports announcer. At the time, Gumbel was selling hospital supplies in Detroit. He ultimately got the job, returned to Chicago and worked at WMAQ-TV for seven years. The sportscaster Gumbel replaced, Dennis Swanson, went on to become president of ABC Sports.

Prior to his rising to prominence at CBS, Gumbel worked for MSG, ESPN, and WFAN radio in New York City. At ESPN, he anchored the show SportsCenter and did play-by-play for early NBA games. On MSG, Gumbel served as a backup announcer for Marv Albert on New York Knicks broadcasts as well as providing coverage for college basketball. In addition to his MSG duties, Gumbel was the host of the first radio morning show on radio station WFAN. However, station management replaced him with WNBC Radio personality Don Imus once WFAN took over WNBC's AM 660 frequency.

==== First CBS stint ====
Gumbel's CBS career began with part-time work as an NFL announcer in 1988. In 1989, he began announcing college basketball as well. After MSG signed a large contract to broadcast New York Yankees games the same year, Gumbel served as host of the pregame and postgame shows. He became host of The NFL Today (alongside Terry Bradshaw) for the 1990 to 1993 seasons. Gumbel also anchored CBS' coverage of Major League Baseball, college football, and, in 1999, CBS' coverage as a studio host for the Daytona 500 and Pepsi 400.

Besides his hosting duties, Gumbel provided play-by-play for the NBA (alongside Quinn Buckner), Major League Baseball including the 1993 American League Championship Series (alongside Jim Kaat), and College World Series baseball.

Gumbel was the prime-time anchor for the 1994 Winter Olympic Games from Lillehammer, Norway, and co-anchor for the weekday morning broadcasts of the 1992 Winter Olympics from Albertville, France.

==== NBC Sports ====
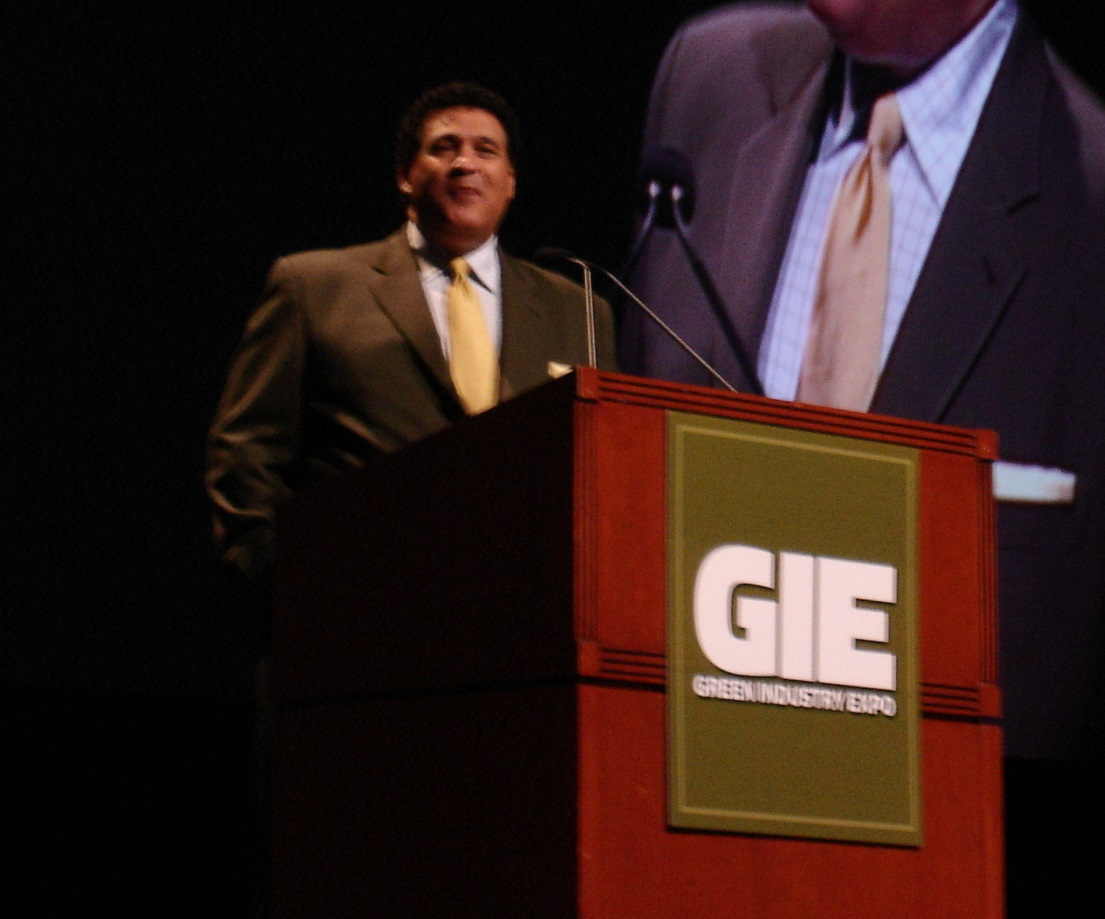
Gumbel in 2005

Gumbel moved to NBC in 1994 following CBS' losses of the NFL and Major League Baseball broadcasting contracts (Gumbel's last on-air assignment for CBS was providing play-by-play for the College World Series). While at NBC, he hosted NBC's coverage of the 1994 Major League Baseball All-Star Game. Gumbel also did play-by-play for the 1995 Major League Baseball National League Division Series and National League Championship Series (on both occasions, teaming with Joe Morgan), did play-by-play for The NBA on NBC, hosted NBC's daytime coverage of the 1996 Summer Olympics from Atlanta, Georgia, hosted the 1995 World Championships of Figure Skating, and served as the studio host for The NFL on NBC beginning in 1994. Gumbel's last assignment for NBC was Super Bowl XXXII, for which he hosted the pregame show and presided over the postgame trophy presentation; incidentally, this was also NBC's final telecast of NFL games until they took control of the Sunday night game beginning in 2006.

==== Second CBS stint ====
Gumbel returned to CBS in March of 1998. The network announced that he would serve as studio host for the network's coverage of college basketball, including the annual NCAA tournament. In addition, since CBS had recently regained NFL broadcast rights by outbidding NBC for its coverage of the AFC, they named Gumbel as their lead broadcaster beginning in the fall of 1998, with Phil Simms as his color commentator. Gumbel was the lead announcer for the NFL on CBS between 1998 and 2003, calling Super Bowls XXXV and XXXVIII. For the 2004 NFL season, Gumbel traded positions with Jim Nantz as host of The NFL Today with Nantz taking over as lead announcer.

At the end of the 2005 NFL season, Gumbel was replaced as studio host of The NFL Today by James Brown. Gumbel returned to the broadcast booth as the No. 2 play-by-play man, replacing Dick Enberg, alongside color man Dan Dierdorf until Dierdorf retired after the 2013–14 NFL season. Gumbel also worked alongside Trent Green in the No. 3 team from 2014 until 2019. He worked in a three-man booth with Green and Bruce Arians for the 2018 NFL season. Gumbel then traded spots with Kevin Harlan in 2020, teaming with Rich Gannon. Adam Archuleta became Gumbel's partner in the No. 4 slot the following year after CBS declined to renew Gannon's contract.

CBS Sports extended its contract with Gumbel on March 15, 2023, which allowed him to continue hosting college basketball while stepping back from NFL coverage. However, Gumbel was absent from March Madness coverage in 2024 due to family health issues.

== Personal life and death ==
In 1976, Gumbel married Marcy Kaczynski, with whom he had a daughter.

Gumbel regularly appeared on Howard Stern's radio show.

Gumbel died from pancreatic cancer at home in Davie, Florida, on December 27, 2024; he was 78 years old.

== Legacy ==
Gumbel is one of a few sports announcers to have worked on pre-game, play-by-play, and radio Super Bowl broadcast teams. He hosted the television pre-game show for Super Bowl XXVI (CBS); Super Bowl XXX (NBC); Super Bowl XXXII (NBC); Super Bowl XLVII (CBS); and Super Bowl 50 (CBS); provided television play-by-play for Super Bowl XXXV (CBS) and Super Bowl XXXVIII (CBS); hosted the radio pre-game show for Super Bowl XXV (CBS); Super Bowl XXVI (CBS); Super Bowl XXVII (CBS); and Super Bowl XXVIII (CBS).

During his tenure as the chief anchor of The NFL Today, Gumbel served alongside co-anchors Dan Marino, Shannon Sharpe, and Boomer Esiason. He was nicknamed "Gumby" by some of his colleagues.

== Awards and honors ==
- Three time Emmy Award winner, MSG (once) and WMAQ-TV (twice)
- Inductee, Loras College Athletic Hall of Fame, 2023
- Legends for Charity –The Pat Summerall Award, 2007

Media offices
Preceded by Brent Musburger; Jim Nantz	The NFL Today host 1990–1993; 2004–2005	Succeeded by Jim Nantz (in 1998); James Brown
Preceded by Tim McCarver and Paula Zahn	American television prime time anchor, Winter Olympic Games; 1994	Succeeded by Jim Nantz
Preceded by Jim Lampley	Studio host, NFL on NBC; 1994–1997	Succeeded by Bob Costas (in 2006)
Preceded by Bob Costas, Dick Enberg, Gayle Gardner and Hannah Storm	American television daytime anchor, Summer Olympic Games; 1996	Succeeded by Hannah Storm
Preceded by Pat O'Brien	Studio host, College Basketball on CBS; 1998–2024	
Preceded by Dick Enberg	#2 play-by-play announcer, NFL on CBS; 2006–2013	Succeeded by Ian Eagle
Preceded by Dick Enberg	Super Bowl television play-by-play announcer (AFC package carrier); 2000–2003	Succeeded by Jim Nantz
Preceded by Bob Costas (in 1989)	#2 play-by-play announcer, Major League Baseball on NBC; 1995	Defunct
Preceded by Dick Stockton	Secondary play-by-play announcer, Major League Baseball Game of the Week; 1993	Succeeded by Thom Brennaman (in 1996)
