= 1993 California Angels season =

Major League Baseball season

1993 California Angels
- League: American League
- Division: West
- Ballpark: Anaheim Stadium
- City: Anaheim, California
- Record: 71–91 (.438)
- Divisional place: 5th
- Owner: Gene Autry
- General managers: Dan O'Brien Sr., Whitey Herzog
- Manager: Buck Rodgers
- Television: KTLA; Prime Ticket (Ken Wilson, Ken Brett)
- Radio: KMPC (Bob Starr, Billy Sample); XPRS (Ruben Valentin, Ulpiano Cos Villa)
- Stats: ESPN.com; Baseball Reference

The 1993 California Angels season was the 33rd season of the California Angels franchise in the American League, the 28th in Anaheim, and their 28th season playing their home games at Anaheim Stadium. The Angels finished fifth in the American League West with a record of 71 wins and 91 losses.

== Offseason ==
- November 19, 1992: Torey Lovullo was signed as a free agent with the California Angels.
- November 19, 1992: Rob Ducey was released by the California Angels.
- December 6, 1992: Jim Abbott was traded by the California Angels to the New York Yankees for J. T. Snow, Jerry Nielsen, and Russ Springer.
- December 8, 1992: Kelly Gruber was traded by the Toronto Blue Jays with cash to the California Angels for Luis Sojo.
- December 11, 1992: Chili Davis signed as a free agent with the California Angels.
- January 29, 1993: Jerome Walton was signed as a free agent with the California Angels.
- February 11, 1993: Scott Sanderson was signed as a free agent with the California Angels.

== Regular season ==
- September 17, 1993: Greg Myers of the Angels was the final strikeout victim of Nolan Ryan. It would be Ryan's 5,714th strikeout.

=== Season standings ===
AL West
Team	W	L	Pct.	GB	Home	Road
Chicago White Sox	94	68	.580	—	45‍–‍36	49‍–‍32
Texas Rangers	86	76	.531	8	50‍–‍31	36‍–‍45
Kansas City Royals	84	78	.519	10	43‍–‍38	41‍–‍40
Seattle Mariners	82	80	.506	12	46‍–‍35	36‍–‍45
California Angels	71	91	.438	23	44‍–‍37	27‍–‍54
Minnesota Twins	71	91	.438	23	36‍–‍45	35‍–‍46
Oakland Athletics	68	94	.420	26	38‍–‍43	30‍–‍51

=== Record vs. opponents ===
1993 American League record Source: MLB Standings Grid – 1993
Team	BAL	BOS	CAL	CWS	CLE	DET	KC	MIL	MIN	NYY	OAK	SEA	TEX	TOR
Baltimore	—	6–7	7–5	4–8	8–5	5–8	7–5	8–5	8–4	6–7	10–2	7–5	4–8	5–8
Boston	7–6	—	7–5	7–5	5–8	6–7	5–7	5–8	7–5	6–7	9–3	7–5	6–6	3–10
California	5–7	5–7	—	7–6	5–7	4–8	6–7	7–5	4–9	6–6	6–7	6–7	6–7	4–8
Chicago	8–4	5–7	6–7	—	9–3	7–5	6–7	9–3	10–3	4–8	7–6	9–4	8–5	6–6
Cleveland	5–8	8–5	7–5	3–9	—	6–7	7–5	8–5	4–8	6–7	8–4	3–9	7–5	4–9
Detroit	8–5	7–6	8–4	5–7	7–6	—	5–7	8–5	6–6	4–9	8–4	7–5	6–6	6–7
Kansas City	5–7	7–5	7–6	7–6	5–7	7–5	—	5–7	7–6	6–6	6–7	7–6	7–6	8–4
Milwaukee	5–8	8–5	5–7	3–9	5–8	5–8	7–5	—	7–5	4–9	7–5	4–8	4–8	5–8
Minnesota	4–8	5–7	9–4	3–10	8–4	6–6	6–7	5–7	—	4–8	8–5	4–9	7–6	2–10
New York	7–6	7–6	6–6	8–4	7–6	9–4	6–6	9–4	8–4	—	6–6	7–5	3–9	5–8
Oakland	2–10	3–9	7–6	6–7	4–8	4–8	7–6	5–7	5–8	6–6	—	9–4	5–8	5–7
Seattle	5–7	5–7	7–6	4–9	9–3	5–7	6–7	8–4	9–4	5–7	4–9	—	8–5	7–5
Texas	8–4	6–6	7–6	5–8	5–7	6–6	6–7	8–4	6–7	9–3	8–5	5–8	—	7–5
Toronto	8–5	10–3	8–4	6–6	9–4	7–6	4–8	8–5	10–2	8–5	7–5	5–7	5–7	—

=== Notable transactions ===
- June 3, 1993: Gary Gaetti was released by the California Angels.
- June 17, 1993: Doug Linton was selected off waivers by the California Angels from the Toronto Blue Jays.
- August 3, 1993: Scott Sanderson was selected off waivers by the San Francisco Giants from the California Angels.
- August 20, 1993: Jerome Walton was released by the California Angels.
- September 7, 1993: Kelly Gruber was released by the California Angels.
- September 14, 1993: Doug Linton was released by the California Angels.

=== Roster ===
1993 California Angels
Roster
Pitchers: 56 Brian Anderson; 23 Mike Butcher; 32 Chuck Crim; 38 John Farrell; 31 Chuck Finley; 41 Steve Frey; 19 Joe Grahe; 48 Hilly Hathaway; 42 Mark Holzemer; 12 Mark Langston; 45,21 Phil Leftwich; 18 Scott Lewis; 35 Doug Linton; 32 Joe Magrane; 16 Gene Nelson; 36 Jerry Nielsen; 47 Ken Patterson; 21 Scott Sanderson; 43 Darryl Scott; 40 Russ Springer; 20 Paul Swingle; 34 Julio Valera	Catchers: 13 Larry Gonzales; 11 Greg Myers; 14 John Orton; 24 Ron Tingley; 53 Chris Turner; Infielders: 5 Rod Correia; 33 Gary DiSarcina; 1 Damion Easley; 3 Gary Gaetti; 88 Rene Gonzales; 17 Kelly Gruber; 10 Torey Lovullo; 21,45 Eduardo Pérez; 6 J. T. Snow; 3 Kurt Stillwell; 46 Ty Van Burkleo; 3,8 Jim Walewander	Outfielders: 9 Chad Curtis; 25 Jim Edmonds; 25 Stan Javier; 22 Luis Polonia; 15 Tim Salmon; 20 Jerome Walton; Other batters: 44 Chili Davis	Manager: 7 Buck Rodgers; Coaches: 29 Rod Carew (Hitting); 55 Chuck Hernandez (Pitching); 2 Bobby Knoop (First Base); 39 Ken Macha (Third Base); 50 Jimmie Reese (Assistant); 57 Rick Turner (Bullpen); 37 John Wathan (Bench)

== Player stats ==
=== Batting ===
==== Starters by position ====
Note: Pos = Position; G = Games played; AB = At bats; H = Hits; Avg. = Batting average; HR = Home runs; RBI = Runs batted in

Pos	Player	G	AB	H	Avg.	HR	RBI
C	Greg Myers	108	290	74	.255	7	40
1B	J.T. Snow	129	419	101	.241	16	57
2B	Torey Lovullo	116	367	92	.251	6	30
SS	Gary DiSarcina	126	416	99	.238	3	45
3B	Rene Gonzales	117	335	84	.251	2	31
LF	Luis Polonia	152	576	156	.271	1	32
CF	Chad Curtis	152	583	166	.285	6	59
RF	Tim Salmon	142	515	146	.283	31	95
DH	Chili Davis	152	573	139	.243	27	112

==== Other batters ====
Note: G = Games played; AB = At bats; H = Hits; Avg. = Batting average; HR = Home runs; RBI = Runs batted in

Player	G	AB	H	Avg.	HR	RBI
Stan Javier	92	237	69	.291	3	28
Damion Easley	73	230	72	.313	2	22
Eduardo Pérez	52	180	45	.250	4	30
Rod Correia	64	128	34	.266	0	9
John Orton	37	95	18	.189	1	4
Ron Tingley	58	90	18	.200	0	12
Chris Turner	25	75	21	.280	1	13
Kelly Gruber	18	65	18	.277	3	9
Kurt Stillwell	22	61	16	.262	0	3
Jim Edmonds	18	61	15	.246	0	4
Gary Gaetti	20	50	9	.180	0	4
Ty Van Burkleo	12	33	5	.152	1	1
Jim Walewander	12	8	1	.125	0	3
Jerome Walton	5	2	0	.000	0	0
Larry Gonzales	2	2	1	.500	0	1

=== Pitching ===
==== Starting pitchers ====
Note: G = Games pitched; IP = Innings pitched; W = Wins; L = Losses; ERA = Earned run average; SO = Strikeouts

Player	G	IP	W	L	ERA	SO
Mark Langston	35	256.1	16	11	3.20	196
Chuck Finley	35	251.1	16	14	3.15	187
Scott Sanderson	21	135.1	7	11	4.46	66
John Farrell	21	90.2	3	12	7.35	35
Phil Leftwich	12	80.2	4	6	3.79	31
Hilly Hathaway	11	57.1	4	3	5.02	11
Joe Magrane	8	48.0	3	2	3.94	24
Mark Holzemer	5	23.1	0	3	8.87	10

==== Other pitchers ====
Note: G = Games pitched; IP = Innings pitched; W = Wins; L = Losses; ERA = Earned run average; SO = Strikeouts

Player	G	IP	W	L	ERA	SO
Russ Springer	14	60.0	1	6	7.20	31
Julio Valera	19	53.0	3	6	6.62	28
Scott Lewis	15	32.0	1	2	4.22	10
Brian Anderson	4	11.1	0	0	3.97	4

===== Relief pitchers =====
Note: G = Games pitched; W = Wins; L = Losses; SV = Saves; ERA = Earned run average; SO = Strikeouts

Player	G	W	L	SV	ERA	SO
Steve Frey	55	2	3	13	2.98	22
Ken Patterson	46	1	1	1	4.58	36
Gene Nelson	46	0	5	4	3.08	31
Joe Grahe	45	4	1	11	2.86	31
Mike Butcher	23	1	0	8	2.86	24
Doug Linton	19	2	0	0	7.71	19
Darryl Scott	16	1	2	0	5.85	13
Chuck Crim	11	2	2	0	5.87	10
Jerry Nielsen	10	0	0	0	8.03	8
Paul Swingle	9	0	1	0	8.38	6
Chili Davis	1	0	0	0	0.00	0
Rene Gonzales	1	0	0	0	0.00	0

== Farm system ==
Level	Team	League	Manager
AAA	Vancouver Canadians	Pacific Coast League	Mako Oliveras
AA	Midland Angels	Texas League	Don Long
A	Palm Springs Angels	California League	Mario Mendoza
A	Cedar Rapids Kernels	Midwest League	Mitch Seoane
A-Short Season	Boise Hawks	Northwest League	Tom Kotchman
Rookie	AZL Angels	Arizona League	Bill Lachemann

LEAGUE CHAMPIONS: Boise

Records
Preceded by 1992	California Angels seasons 1993	Succeeded by 1994
