= 1992 California Angels season =

Major League Baseball season

1992 California Angels
- League: American League
- Division: West
- Ballpark: Anaheim Stadium
- City: Anaheim, California
- Record: 72–90 (.444)
- Divisional place: 5th
- Owner: Gene Autry
- General manager: Dan O'Brien Sr.
- Managers: Buck Rodgers and John Wathan
- Television: KTLA; SportsChannel Los Angeles (Ken Wilson, Ken Brett)
- Radio: KMPC (Bob Jamison, Al Conin, Ernie Harwell); XPRS (Ruben Valentin, Ulpiano Cos Villa)
- Stats: ESPN.com; Baseball Reference

The 1992 California Angels season was the 32nd season of the California Angels franchise in the American League, the 27th in Anaheim, and their 27th season playing their home games at Anaheim Stadium. The Angels finished fifth in the American League West with a record of 72 wins and 90 losses.

== Offseason ==
- December 8, 1991: Rubén Amaro, Jr. was traded by the Angels with Kyle Abbott to the Philadelphia Phillies for Von Hayes.
- December 10, 1991: Hubie Brooks was traded by the New York Mets to the Angels for Dave Gallagher.
- January 17, 1992: Dick Schofield was signed as a free agent with the Angels.
- January 22, 1992: Bert Blyleven signed as a free agent with the Angels.
- January 27, 1992: Terry McGriff was signed as a free agent with the Angels.
- March 25, 1992: Shawn Abner was released by the Angels.

== Regular season ==
- On May 19, 1992, Bobby Rose hit a home run in the last at-bat of his career.

=== Season standings ===
AL West
Team	W	L	Pct.	GB	Home	Road
Oakland Athletics	96	66	.593	—	51‍–‍30	45‍–‍36
Minnesota Twins	90	72	.556	6	48‍–‍33	42‍–‍39
Chicago White Sox	86	76	.531	10	50‍–‍32	36‍–‍44
Texas Rangers	77	85	.475	19	36‍–‍45	41‍–‍40
California Angels	72	90	.444	24	41‍–‍40	31‍–‍50
Kansas City Royals	72	90	.444	24	44‍–‍37	28‍–‍53
Seattle Mariners	64	98	.395	32	38‍–‍43	26‍–‍55

=== Record vs. opponents ===
1992 American League record Sources:
Team	BAL	BOS	CAL	CWS	CLE	DET	KC	MIL	MIN	NYY	OAK	SEA	TEX	TOR
Baltimore	—	8–5	8–4	6–6	7–6	10–3	8–4	6–7	6–6	5–8	6–6	7–5	7–5	5–8
Boston	5–8	—	8–4	6–6	6–7	4–9	7–5	5–8	3–9	7–6	5–7	6–6	4–8	7–6
California	4–8	4–8	—	3–10	6–6	7–5	8–5	5–7	2–11	7–5	5–8	7–6	9–4	5–7
Chicago	6–6	6–6	10–3	—	7–5	10–2	7–6	5–7	8–5	8–4	5–8	4–9	5–8	5–7
Cleveland	6–7	7–6	6–6	5–7	—	5–8	5–7	5–8	6–6	7–6	6–6	7–5	5–7	6–7
Detroit	3–10	9–4	5–7	2–10	8–5	—	7–5	5–8	3–9	5–8	6–6	9–3	8–4	5–8
Kansas City	4–8	5–7	5–8	6–7	7–5	5–7	—	7–5	6–7	5–7	4–9	7–6	6–7	5–7
Milwaukee	7–6	8–5	7–5	7–5	8–5	8–5	5–7	—	6–6	6–7	7–5	8–4	7–5	8–5
Minnesota	6–6	9–3	11–2	5–8	6–6	9–3	7–6	6–6	—	7–5	5–8	8–5	6–7	5–7
New York	8–5	6–7	5–7	4–8	6–7	8–5	7–5	7–6	5–7	—	6–6	6–6	6–6	2–11
Oakland	6–6	7–5	8–5	8–5	6–6	6–6	9–4	5–7	8–5	6–6	—	12–1	9–4	6–6
Seattle	5–7	6–6	6–7	9–4	5–7	3–9	6–7	4–8	5–8	6–6	1–12	—	4–9	4–8
Texas	5–7	8–4	4–9	8–5	7–5	4–8	7–6	5–7	7–6	6–6	4–9	9–4	—	3–9
Toronto	8–5	6–7	7–5	7–5	7–6	8–5	7–5	5–8	7–5	11–2	6–6	8–4	9–3	—

=== Roster ===
1992 California Angels
Roster
Pitchers: 25 Jim Abbott; 43 Scott Bailes; 28 Bert Blyleven; 23,48 Mike Butcher; 32 Chuck Crim; 45 Mark Eichhorn; 31 Chuck Finley; 40,51 Tim Fortugno; 41 Steve Frey; 19,20 Joe Grahe; 34 Bryan Harvey; 48 Hilly Hathaway; 12 Mark Langston; 18 Scott Lewis; 40 Don Robinson; 44 Julio Valera	Catchers: 20 Mike Fitzgerald; 21 Greg Myers; 14 John Orton; 13 Lance Parrish; 24 Ron Tingley; Infielders: 21 Alvin Davis; 8 Hubie Brooks; 11,33 Gary DiSarcina; 46 Damion Easley; 3 Gary Gaetti; 88 Rene Gonzales; 5 Ken Oberkfell; 6 Bobby Rose; 17 Dick Schofield; 10 Luis Sojo; 9,23 Lee Stevens	Outfielders: 17,30 Chad Curtis; 16 Rob Ducey; 47 Junior Félix; 38 José González; 9 Von Hayes; 33 John Morris; 22 Luis Polonia; 15 Tim Salmon; 11 Reggie Williams	Manager: 53 Marcel Lachemann; 7 Buck Rodgers; 37 John Wathan; Coaches: 29 Rod Carew (Hitting); 2 Deron Johnson (Bench); 1 Bobby Knoop (First Base); 53 Marcel Lachemann (Pitching); 39 Ken Macha (Bullpen); 50 Jimmie Reese (Assistant); 57 Rick Turner; 37 John Wathan (Bench)

=== Transactions ===
- April 3, 1992: Terry McGriff was released by the Angels.
- April 12, 1992: Dick Schofield was traded by the Angels to the New York Mets for Julio Valera with a player to be named later. On October 6, 1992, the Mets sent minor league reliever Julian Vasquez to the Angels to complete the trade.
- July 30, 1992: Mark Eichhorn was traded by the Angels to the Toronto Blue Jays for Rob Ducey and Greg Myers.
- August 21, 1992: Von Hayes was released by the Angels.

== Player stats ==
=== Batting ===
==== Starters by position ====
Note: Pos = Position; G = Games played; AB = At bats; H = Hits; Avg. = Batting average; HR = Home runs; RBI = Runs batted in

Pos.	Player	G	AB	H	Avg.	HR	RBI
C	Mike Fitzgerald	95	189	40	.212	6	17
1B	Lee Stevens	106	312	69	.221	7	37
2B	Luis Sojo	106	368	100	.272	7	43
3B	Gary Gaetti	130	456	103	.226	12	48
SS	Gary DiSarcina	157	518	128	.247	3	42
LF	Luis Polonia	149	577	165	.286	0	35
CF	Junior Félix	139	509	125	.246	9	72
RF	Von Hayes	94	307	69	.225	4	29
DH	Hubie Brooks	82	306	66	.216	8	36

==== Other batters ====
Note: G = Games played; AB = At bats; H = Hits; Avg. = Batting average; HR = Home runs; RBI = Runs batted in

Player	G	AB	H	Avg.	HR	RBI
Chad Curtis	139	441	114	.259	10	46
Rene Gonzales	104	329	91	.277	7	38
Damion Easley	47	151	39	.258	1	12
Ron Tingley	71	127	25	.197	3	8
John Orton	43	114	25	.219	2	12
Alvin Davis	40	104	26	.250	0	16
Ken Oberkfell	41	91	24	.264	0	10
Bobby Rose	30	84	18	.214	2	10
Lance Parrish	24	83	19	.229	4	11
Tim Salmon	23	79	14	.177	2	6
Rob Ducey	31	59	14	.237	0	2
John Morris	43	57	11	.193	1	3
José González	33	55	10	.182	0	2
Reggie Williams	14	26	6	.231	0	2
Greg Myers	8	17	4	.235	0	0
Dick Schofield	1	3	1	.333	0	0

=== Pitching ===
==== Starting pitchers ====
Note: G = Games pitched; IP = Innings pitched; W = Wins; L = Losses; ERA = Earned run average; SO = Strikeouts

Player	G	IP	W	L	ERA	SO
Mark Langston	32	229.0	13	14	3.66	174
Jim Abbott	29	211.0	7	15	2.77	130
Chuck Finley	31	204.1	7	12	3.96	124
Julio Valera	30	188.0	8	11	3.73	113
Bert Blyleven	25	133.0	8	12	4.74	70
Don Robinson	3	16.1	1	0	2.20	9

==== Other pitchers ====
Note: G = Games pitched; IP = Innings pitched; W = Wins; L = Losses; ERA = Earned run average; SO = Strikeouts

Player	G	IP	W	L	ERA	SO
Tim Fortugno	14	41.2	1	1	5.18	31
Hilly Hathaway	2	5.2	0	0	7.94	1

===== Relief pitchers =====
Note: G = Games pitched; W = Wins; L = Losses; SV = Saves; ERA = Earned run average; SO = Strikeouts

Player	G	W	L	SV	ERA	SO
Joe Grahe	46	5	6	21	3.52	39
Chuck Crim	57	7	6	1	5.17	30
Steve Frey	51	4	2	4	3.57	24
Mark Eichhorn	42	2	4	2	2.38	42
Scott Bailes	32	3	1	0	7.45	25
Bryan Harvey	25	0	4	13	2.83	34
Scott Lewis	21	4	0	0	3.99	18
Mike Butcher	19	2	2	0	3.25	24

== Farm system ==
Level	Team	League	Manager
AAA	Edmonton Trappers	Pacific Coast League	Mako Oliveras
AA	Midland Angels	Texas League	Don Long
A	Palm Springs Angels	California League	Mario Mendoza
A	Quad Cities River Bandits	Midwest League	Mitch Seoane
A-Short Season	Boise Hawks	Northwest League	Tom Kotchman
Rookie	AZL Angels	Arizona League	Bill Lachemann

Records
Preceded by 1991	California Angels seasons 1992	Succeeded by 1993
