= 1990 California Angels season =

Major League Baseball season

1990 California Angels
- League: American League
- Division: West
- Ballpark: Anaheim Stadium
- City: Anaheim, California
- Record: 80–82 (.494)
- Divisional place: 4th
- Owner: Gene Autry
- General manager: Mike Port
- Manager: Doug Rader
- Television: KTLA (Joe Torre, Reggie Jackson, Paul Olden); SportsChannel Los Angeles (Joe Torre, Joe Garagiola, Charlie Jones)
- Radio: KMPC (Ken Brett, Al Conin); XPRS (Ruben Valentin, Ulpiano Cos Villa)
- Stats: ESPN.com; Baseball Reference

The 1990 California Angels season was the 30th season of the California Angels franchise in the American League, the 25th in Anaheim, and their 25th season playing their home games at Anaheim Stadium. The Angels finished fourth in the American League West with a record of 80 wins and 82 losses.

== Offseason ==
- October 6, 1989: Jim Eppard was released by the California Angels.
- December 19, 1989: Mark Eichhorn was signed as a free agent with the California Angels.
- January 9, 1990: Scott Bailes was traded by the Cleveland Indians to the California Angels for Colin Charland (minors) and Jeff Manto.
- February 3, 1990: Greg Minton was released by the California Angels.
- February 5, 1990: Rick Schu was signed as a free agent with the California Angels.
- February 21, 1990: Greg Minton was signed as a free agent with the California Angels.

== Regular season ==
=== Transactions ===
- April 29, 1990: Luis Polonia was traded by the New York Yankees to the California Angels for Claudell Washington and Rich Monteleone.
- May 11, 1990 – The California Angels sent Mike Witt to the New York Yankees in exchange for Dave Winfield

=== Season standings ===
AL West
Team	W	L	Pct.	GB	Home	Road
Oakland Athletics	103	59	.636	—	51‍–‍30	52‍–‍29
Chicago White Sox	94	68	.580	9	49‍–‍31	45‍–‍37
Texas Rangers	83	79	.512	20	47‍–‍35	36‍–‍44
California Angels	80	82	.494	23	42‍–‍39	38‍–‍43
Seattle Mariners	77	85	.475	26	38‍–‍43	39‍–‍42
Kansas City Royals	75	86	.466	27½	45‍–‍36	30‍–‍50
Minnesota Twins	74	88	.457	29	41‍–‍40	33‍–‍48

=== Record vs. opponents ===
1990 American League record Sources:
Team	BAL	BOS	CAL	CWS	CLE	DET	KC	MIL	MIN	NYY	OAK	SEA	TEX	TOR
Baltimore	—	4–9	7–5	6–6	6–7	6–7	8–3	7–6	6–6	6–7	4–8	3–9	8–4	5–8
Boston	9–4	—	7–5	6–6	9–4	8–5	4–8	5–8	4–8	9–4	4–8	8–4	5–7	10–3
California	5–7	5–7	—	5–8	7–5	5–7	7–6	7–5	9–4	6–6	4–9	5–8	8–5	7–5
Chicago	6–6	6–6	8–5	—	5–7	5–7	9–4	10–2	7–6	10–2	8–5	8–5	7–6	5–7
Cleveland	7–6	4–9	5–7	7–5	—	5–8	6–6	9–4	7–5	5–8	4–8	7–5	7–5	4–9
Detroit	7–6	5–8	7–5	7–5	8–5	—	5–7	3–10	6–6	7–6	6–6	7–5	6–6	5–8
Kansas City	3–8	8–4	6–7	4–9	6–6	7–5	—	4–8	8–5	8–4	4–9	7–6	5–8	5–7
Milwaukee	6–7	8–5	5–7	2–10	4–9	10–3	8–4	—	4–8	6–7	5–7	4–8	5–7	7–6
Minnesota	6–6	8–4	4–9	6–7	5–7	6–6	5–8	8–4	—	6–6	6–7	6–7	5–8	3–9
New York	7–6	4–9	6–6	2–10	8–5	6–7	4–8	7–6	6–6	—	0–12	9–3	3–9	5–8
Oakland	8–4	8–4	9–4	5–8	8–4	6–6	9–4	7–5	7–6	12–0	—	9–4	8–5	7–5
Seattle	9–3	4–8	8–5	5–8	5–7	5–7	6–7	8–4	7–6	3–9	4–9	—	7–6	6–6
Texas	4–8	7–5	5–8	6–7	5–7	6–6	8–5	7–5	8–5	9–3	5–8	6–7	—	7–5
Toronto	8–5	3–10	5–7	7–5	9–4	8–5	7–5	6–7	9–3	8–5	5–7	6–6	5–7	—

=== Roster ===
1990 California Angels
Roster
Pitchers: 25 Jim Abbott; 43 Scott Bailes; 28 Bert Blyleven; 36,46 Mark Clear; 36 Sherman Corbett; 45 Mark Eichhorn; 48 Mike Fetters; 31 Chuck Finley; 27 Willie Fraser; 44 Joe Grahe; 34 Bryan Harvey; 12 Mark Langston; 46 Scott Lewis; 15 Kirk McCaskill; 33,37 Bob McClure; 38 Greg Minton; 37 Jeff Richardson; 39 Mike Witt; 35 Cliff Young	Catchers: 14 John Orton; 13 Lance Parrish; 23 Bill Schroeder; 32,41 Ron Tingley; Infielders: 7 Kent Anderson; 10 Pete Coachman; 11 Gary DiSarcina; 18,22 Donnie Hill; 16 Jack Howell; 21 Wally Joyner; 10 Mark McLemore; 3 Johnny Ray; 6 Bobby Rose; 17 Dick Schofield; 20,60 Rick Schu; 9 Lee Stevens	Outfielders: 19 Dante Bichette; 24 Chili Davis; 18,22 Luis Polonia; 8 Max Venable; 18 Claudell Washington; 30,39 Devon White; 32 Dave Winfield; Other batters: 5 Brian Downing	Manager: 4 Doug Rader; Coaches: 40 Joe Coleman (bullpen); 2 Deron Johnson (hitting); 1 Bobby Knoop (first base); 53 Marcel Lachemann (pitching); 50 Jimmie Reese (conditioning); 47 Moose Stubing (third base)

== Player stats ==
=== Batting ===
==== Starters by position ====
Note: Pos = Position; G = Games played; AB = At bats; H = Hits; Avg. = Batting average; HR = Home runs; RBI = Runs batted in

Pos.	Player	G	AB	H	Avg.	HR	RBI
C	Lance Parrish	133	470	126	.268	24	70
1B	Wally Joyner	83	310	83	.268	8	41
2B	Johnny Ray	105	404	112	.277	5	43
3B	Jack Howell	105	316	72	.228	8	33
SS	Dick Schofield	99	310	79	.255	1	18
LF	Luis Polonia	109	381	128	.336	2	32
CF	Devon White	125	443	96	.217	11	44
RF	Dave Winfield	112	414	114	.275	19	72
DH	Brian Downing	96	330	90	.273	14	51

==== Other batters ====
Note: G = Games played; AB = At bats; H = Hits; Avg. = Batting average; HR = Home runs; RBI = Runs batted in

Player	G	AB	H	Avg.	HR	RBI
Chili Davis	113	412	109	.265	12	58
Donnie Hill	102	352	93	.264	3	32
Dante Bichette	109	349	89	.255	15	53
Lee Stevens	67	248	53	.214	7	32
Max Venable	93	189	49	.259	4	21
Rick Schu	61	157	42	.268	6	14
Kent Anderson	49	143	44	.308	1	5
John Orton	31	84	16	.190	1	6
Bill Schroeder	18	58	13	.224	4	9
Gary Disarcina	18	57	8	.140	0	0
Mark McLemore	20	48	7	.146	0	2
Pete Coachman	16	45	14	.311	0	5
Claudell Washington	12	34	6	.176	1	3
Bobby Rose	7	13	5	.385	1	2
Ron Tingley	5	3	0	.000	0	0

=== Pitching ===
==== Starting pitchers ====
Note: G = Games pitched; IP = Innings pitched; W = Wins; L = Losses; ERA = Earned run average; SO = Strikeouts

Player	G	IP	W	L	ERA	SO
Chuck Finley	32	236.0	18	9	2.40	177
Mark Langston	33	223.0	10	17	4.40	195
Jim Abbott	33	211.2	10	14	4.51	105
Kirk McCaskill	29	174.1	12	11	3.25	78
Bert Blyleven	23	134.0	8	7	5.24	69
Joe Grahe	8	43.1	3	4	4.98	25
Scott Lewis	2	16.1	1	1	2.20	9

==== Relief pitchers ====
Note: G = Games pitched; W = Wins; L = Losses; SV = Saves; ERA = Earned run average; SO = Strikeouts

Player	G	W	L	SV	ERA	SO
Bryan Harvey	54	4	4	25	3.22	82
Mark Eichhorn	60	2	5	13	3.08	69
Willie Fraser	45	5	4	2	3.08	32
Scott Bailes	27	2	0	0	6.37	16
Mike Fetters	26	1	1	1	4.12	35
Cliff Young	17	1	1	0	3.52	19
Greg Minton	11	1	1	0	2.35	4
Bob McClure	11	2	0	0	6.43	6
Mike Witt	10	0	3	1	1.77	14
Mark Clear	4	0	0	0	5.87	6
Sherman Corbett	4	0	0	0	9.00	2
Donnie Hill	1	0	0	0	0.00	1
Jeff Richardson	1	0	0	0	0.00	0

== Farm system ==
Level	Team	League	Manager
AAA	Edmonton Trappers	Pacific Coast League	Mako Oliveras
AA	Midland Angels	Texas League	Eddie Rodríguez
A	Palm Springs Angels	California League	Nate Oliver
A	Quad Cities Angels	Midwest League	Don Long
A-Short Season	Boise Hawks	Northwest League	Tom Kotchman
Rookie	AZL Angels	Arizona League	Bill Lachemann

LEAGUE CHAMPIONS: Quad Cities

Records
Preceded by 1989	California Angels seasons 1990	Succeeded by 1991
