= 1989 California Angels season =

Major League Baseball season

1989 California Angels
- League: American League
- Division: West
- Ballpark: Anaheim Stadium
- City: Anaheim, California
- Record: 91–71 (.562)
- Divisional place: 3rd
- Owner: Gene Autry
- General manager: Mike Port
- Manager: Doug Rader
- Television: KTLA (Joe Torre, Bob Starr); Z Channel (Joe Torre, Joel Meyers)
- Radio: KMPC (Ken Brett, Al Conin); XPRS (Ruben Valentin, Ulpiano Cos Villa)
- Stats: ESPN.com; Baseball Reference

The 1989 California Angels season was the 29th season of the California Angels franchise in the American League, the 24th in Anaheim, and their 24th season playing their home games at Anaheim Stadium. The Angels finished third in the American League West with a record of 91 wins and 71 losses.

== Offseason ==
- November 3, 1988: Mike Cook, Paul Sorrento, and Rob Wassenaar (minors) were traded by the Angels to the Minnesota Twins for Bert Blyleven and Kevin Trudeau (minors).
- January 11, 1989: Max Venable was signed as a free agent by the Angels.
- March 9, 1989: DeWayne Buice was traded by the California Angels to the Toronto Blue Jays for Cliff Young.

== Regular season ==
- September 9, 1989: Devon White became the first member of the Angels to steal three bases in one inning against the Boston Red Sox.

=== Season standings ===
AL West
Team	W	L	Pct.	GB	Home	Road
Oakland Athletics	99	63	.611	—	54‍–‍27	45‍–‍36
Kansas City Royals	92	70	.568	7	55‍–‍26	37‍–‍44
California Angels	91	71	.562	8	52‍–‍29	39‍–‍42
Texas Rangers	83	79	.512	16	45‍–‍36	38‍–‍43
Minnesota Twins	80	82	.494	19	45‍–‍36	35‍–‍46
Seattle Mariners	73	89	.451	26	40‍–‍41	33‍–‍48
Chicago White Sox	69	92	.429	29½	35‍–‍45	34‍–‍47

=== Record vs. opponents ===
1989 American League record Sources:
Team	BAL	BOS	CAL	CWS	CLE	DET	KC	MIL	MIN	NYY	OAK	SEA	TEX	TOR
Baltimore	—	6–7	6–6	6–6	7–6	10–3	6–6	7–6	4–8	8–5	5–7	6–6	9–3	7–6
Boston	7–6	—	4–8	7–5	8–5	11–2	4–8	6–7	6–6	7–6	7–5	5–7	6–6	5–8
California	6–6	8–4	—	8–5	5–7	11–1	4–9	7–5	11–2	6–6	5–8	7–6	6–7	7–5
Chicago	6–6	5–7	5–8	—	7–5	4–8	6–7	10–2	5–8	5–6	5–8	7–6	3–10	1–11
Cleveland	6–7	5–8	7–5	5–7	—	5–8	8–4	3–10	5–7	9–4	2–10	6–6	7–5	5–8
Detroit	3–10	2–11	1–11	8–4	8–5	—	6–6	6–7	5–7	6–7	4–8	4–8	4–8	2–11
Kansas City	6–6	8–4	9–4	7–6	4–8	6–6	—	8–4	7–6	6–6	7–6	9–4	8–5	7–5
Milwaukee	6–7	7–6	5–7	2–10	10–3	7–6	4–8	—	9–3	8–5	5–7	7–5	5–7	6–7
Minnesota	8–4	6–6	2–11	8–5	7–5	7–5	6–7	3–9	—	6–6	6–7	7–6	5–8	9–3
New York	5–8	6–7	6–6	6–5	4–9	7–6	6–6	5–8	6–6	—	3–9	8–4	5–7	7–6
Oakland	7–5	5–7	8–5	8–5	10–2	8–4	6–7	7–5	7–6	9–3	—	9–4	8–5	7–5
Seattle	6–6	7–5	6–7	6–7	6–6	8–4	4–9	5–7	6–7	4–8	4–9	—	6–7	5–7
Texas	3–9	6–6	7–6	10–3	5–7	8–4	5–8	7–5	8–5	7–5	5–8	7–6	—	5–7
Toronto	6–7	8–5	5–7	11–1	8–5	11–2	5–7	7–6	3–9	6–7	5–7	7–5	7–5	—

=== All-Star game ===
The 1989 Major League Baseball All-Star Game was the 60th playing of the midsummer classic between the all-stars of the American League (AL) and National League (NL), the two leagues comprising Major League Baseball. The game was held on July 11, 1989, at Anaheim Stadium in Anaheim, California, the home of the California Angels of the American League. The game resulted in the American League defeating the National League 5–3. The game is remembered for Bo Jackson's monstrous lead-off home run to center field.

=== Notable transactions ===
- June 5, 1989: Chad Curtis was drafted by the California Angels in the 45th round of the 1989 amateur draft. Player signed June 11, 1989.

=== Roster ===
1989 California Angels
Roster
Pitchers: 25 Jim Abbott; 28 Bert Blyleven; 42 Terry Clark; 36 Sherman Corbett; 48 Mike Fetters; 31 Chuck Finley; 27 Willie Fraser; 34 Bryan Harvey; 45 Vance Lovelace; 15 Kirk McCaskill; 33,37 Bob McClure; 38 Greg Minton; 44 Rich Monteleone; 46 Dan Petry; 39 Mike Witt	Catchers: 13 Lance Parrish; 14 John Orton; 14,23 Bill Schroeder; 32 Ron Tingley; Infielders: 7 Kent Anderson; 4 Gary DiSarcina; 11 Jim Eppard; 9 Glenn Hoffman; 16 Jack Howell; 21 Wally Joyner; 10 Mark McLemore; 3 Johnny Ray; 6 Bobby Rose; 22 Dick Schofield	Outfielders: 20 Tony Armas; 19 Dante Bichette; 8 Brian Brady; 24 Chili Davis; 8 Max Venable; 18 Claudell Washington; 30 Devon White; Other batters: 5 Brian Downing	Manager: 12 Doug Rader; Coaches: 40 Joe Coleman (bullpen); -- Deron Johnson (hitting); 1 Bobby Knoop (first base); 53 Marcel Lachemann (pitching); 50 Jimmie Reese (conditioning); 47 Moose Stubing (third base)

== Player stats ==
= Indicates team leader

=== Batting ===
==== Starters by position ====
Note: Pos = Position; G = Games played; AB = At bats; H = Hits; Avg. = Batting average; HR = Home runs; RBI = Runs batted in

Pos	Player	G	AB	H	Avg.	HR	RBI
C	Lance Parrish	124	433	103	.238	17	50
1B	Wally Joyner	159	593	167	.282	16	79
2B	Johnny Ray	134	530	153	.289	5	62
3B	Jack Howell	144	474	108	.228	20	52
SS	Dick Schofield	91	302	69	.228	4	26
LF	Chili Davis	154	560	152	.271	22	90
CF	Devon White	156	636	156	.245	12	56
RF	Claudell Washington	110	418	114	.273	13	42
DH	Brian Downing	142	544	154	.283	14	59

==== Other batters ====
Note: G = Games played; AB = At bats; H = Hits; Avg. = Batting average; HR = Home runs; RBI = Runs batted in

Player	G	AB	H	Avg.	HR	RBI
Kent Anderson	86	223	51	.229	0	17
Tony Armas	60	202	52	.257	11	30
Dante Bichette	48	138	29	.210	3	15
Bill Schroeder	41	138	28	.203	6	15
Glenn Hoffman	48	104	22	.212	1	3
Mark McLemore	32	103	25	.243	0	14
Max Venable	20	53	19	.358	0	4
John Orton	16	39	7	.179	0	4
Bobby Rose	14	38	8	.211	1	3
Jim Eppard	12	12	3	.250	0	2
Ron Tingley	4	3	1	.333	0	0
Brian Brady	2	2	1	.500	0	1
Gary Disarcina	2	0	0	----	0	0

=== Pitching ===
==== Starting pitchers ====
Note: G = Games; IP = Innings pitched; W = Wins; L = Losses; ERA = Earned run average; SO = Strikeouts

Player	G	IP	W	L	ERA	SO
Bert Blyleven	33	241.0	17	5	2.73	131
Mike Witt	33	220.0	9	15	4.54	123
Kirk McCaskill	32	212.0	15	10	2.93	107
Chuck Finley	29	199.2	16	9	2.57	156
Jim Abbott	29	181.1	12	12	3.92	115

==== Other pitchers ====
Note: G = Games pitched; IP = Innings pitched; W = Wins; L = Losses; ERA = Earned run average; SO = Strikeouts

Player	G	IP	W	L	ERA	SO
Dan Petry	19	51.0	3	2	5.47	21
Terry Lee Clark	4	11.0	0	2	4.91	7

==== Relief pitchers ====
Note: G = Games pitched; W = Wins; L = Losses; SV = Saves; ERA = Earned run average; SO = Strikeouts

Player	G	W	L	SV	ERA	SO
Bryan Harvey	51	3	3	25	3.44	78
Greg Minton	62	4	3	8	2.20	42
Bob McClure	48	6	1	3	1.55	36
Willie Fraser	44	4	7	2	3.24	46
Rich Monteleone	24	2	2	0	3.18	27
Sherman Corbett	4	0	0	0	3.38	3
Mike Fetters	1	0	0	0	8.10	4
Vance Lovelace	1	0	0	0	0.00	1

== Awards and honors ==
All-Star Game

- Chuck Finley, Pitcher, Reserve
- Doug Rader, manager, Third-base coach
- Devon White, outfield, Reserve

== Farm system ==
Level	Team	League	Manager
AAA	Edmonton Trappers	Pacific Coast League	Tom Kotchman
AA	Midland Angels	Texas League	Mako Oliveras
A	Palm Springs Angels	California League	Bill Lachemann
A	Quad Cities Angels	Midwest League	Eddie Rodríguez
A-Short Season	Bend Bucks	Northwest League	Don Long
Rookie	AZL Angels	Arizona League	Nate Oliver

Records
Preceded by 1988	California Angels seasons 1989	Succeeded by 1990
