= Rick Turner =

Rick Turner may refer to:

- Rick Turner (luthier) (1943–2022), American builder of guitars and basses
- Rick Turner (philosopher) (1942–1978), South African philosopher allegedly assassinated by the apartheid state
- Rick Turner (baseball) (born 1959), baseball executive
- Rick Turner (archaeologist) (1952–2018), British archaeologist
