= Rod Correia =

American baseball player (born 1967)

- Infielder
- Born: September 13, 1967 (age 58); Providence, Rhode Island, U.S.
- Batted: Right Threw: Right

MLB debut
- June 20, 1993, for the California Angels

Last MLB appearance
- September 16, 1995, for the California Angels

MLB statistics
- Batting average: .259
- Home runs: 0
- Hits: 43
- RBI: 12
- Stats at Baseball Reference

Teams
- California Angels (1993–1995)

Ronald Douglas Correia (born September 13, 1967) is an American former professional baseball player who played parts of three seasons for the California Angels of Major League Baseball (MLB).

== Amateur career ==
Correia played baseball, basketball and football at Dighton-Rehoboth Regional High School in North Dighton, Massachusetts. As a senior baseball player, he hit over .500. Correia played college baseball in NCAA Division III at the University of Massachusetts Dartmouth for three seasons. As a junior, he was named to the Division III All-American First Team. He tied an NCAA record with four home runs in a single game. In 1998, only two years after leaving the school, he was inducted into its athletics hall of fame.

== Professional career ==
Correia was drafted by the Oakland Athletics in the 15th round of the 1988 Major League Baseball draft and assigned to the Southern Oregon A's to begin his professional career. He played in the Oakland farm system until January 1992 when he was traded to the California Angels for a fellow minor leaguer.

He was called up to the minors for the first time on June 20, 1993, when Angels infielder Damion Easley was placed on the disabled list. He made his Major League debut that afternoon against the Chicago White Sox as a defensive replacement at shortstop for Gary DiSarcina. Correia continued as a backup middle infielder for the Angels until DiSarcina suffered a season-ending injury in August. For the remainder of the season, Correia served as the starting shortstop.

In 1994, Correia was called up to the Majors for the first time on May 31 after Angels infielder Rex Hudler was placed on the disabled list. Correia appeared in only six Major League games that season.

On August 3, 1995, DiSarcina's thumb was broken by a pitch and he missed the remainder of the season. Correia filled in for the injured DiSarcina briefly before the team chose to play Easley at shortstop and demote Correia to Triple-A. His final Major League game came on September 16, 1995, at Anaheim Stadium.

He spent the following two seasons in the farm systems of the St. Louis Cardinals, Athletics and Boston Red Sox.
