= Torey Lovullo =

American baseball player and manager (born 1965)

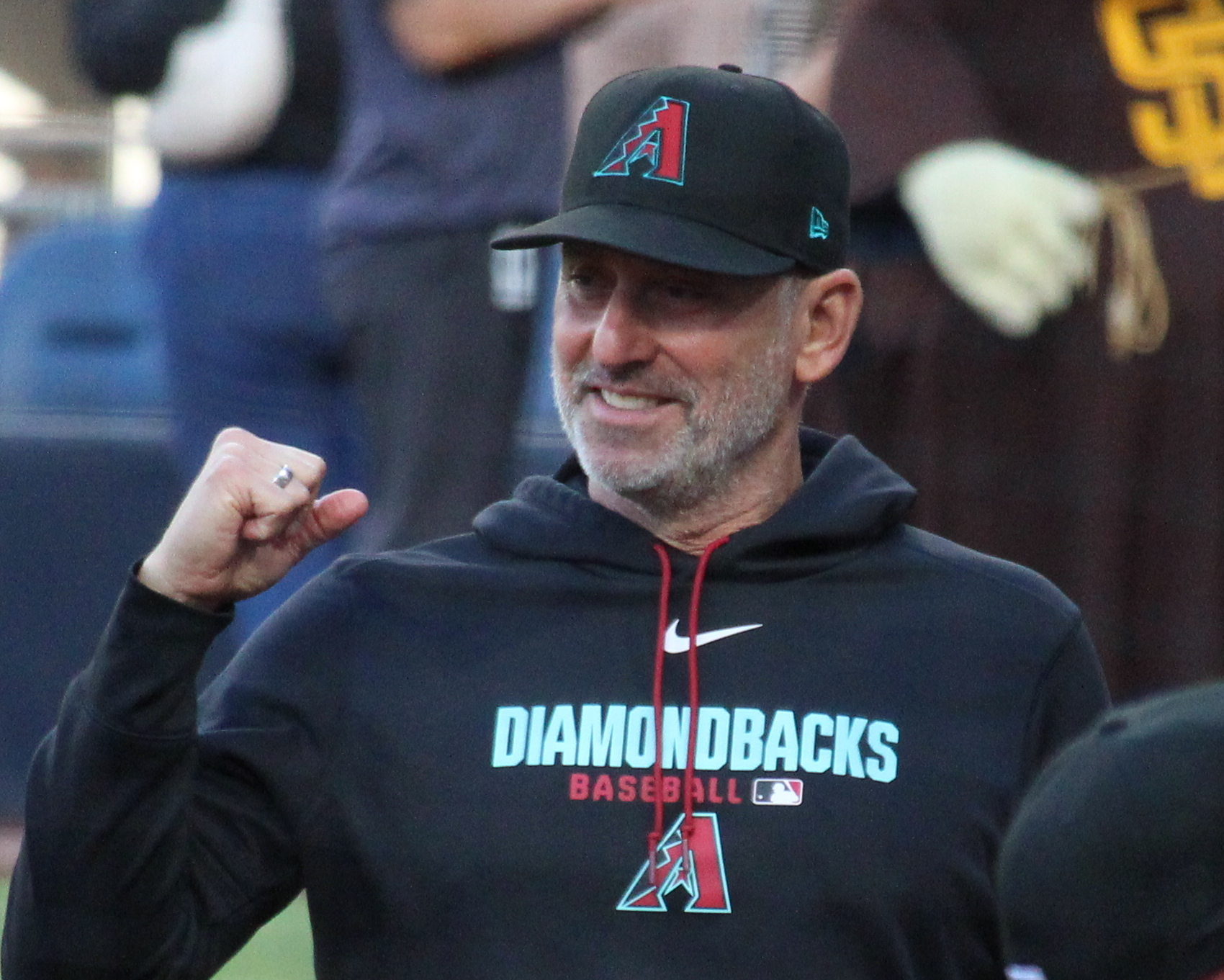
- Lovullo with the Arizona Diamondbacks in 2026

Arizona Diamondbacks – No. 17
- Infielder / Coach / Manager
- Born: July 25, 1965 (age 61); Santa Monica, California, U.S.
- Batted: Switch Threw: Right

Professional debut
- MLB: September 10, 1988, for the Detroit Tigers
- NPB: March 31, 2000, for the Yakult Swallows

Last appearance
- MLB: October 3, 1999, for the Philadelphia Phillies
- NPB: June 4, 2000, for the Yakult Swallows

MLB statistics (through July 12, 2026)
- Batting average: .224
- Home runs: 15
- Runs batted in: 60
- Managerial record: 713–739
- Winning %: .491

NPB statistics
- Batting average: .197
- Home runs: 1
- Runs batted in: 2
- Stats at Baseball Reference
- Managerial record at Baseball Reference

Teams
- As player: Detroit Tigers (1988–1989); New York Yankees (1991); California Angels (1993); Seattle Mariners (1994); Oakland Athletics (1996); Cleveland Indians (1998); Philadelphia Phillies (1999); Tokyo Yakult Swallows (2000); As manager: Arizona Diamondbacks (2017–present); As coach: Toronto Blue Jays (2011–2012); Boston Red Sox (2013–2016)

Career highlights and awards
- World Series champion (2013); NL Manager of the Year (2017)

Salvatore Anthony "Torey" Lovullo (/ləˈvuloʊ/ lə-VOO-loh; born July 25, 1965) is an American former professional baseball infielder and the current manager for the Arizona Diamondbacks of Major League Baseball (MLB).

Lovullo served as the first base coach for the Toronto Blue Jays from 2011 to 2012, then as the bench coach for the Boston Red Sox from 2013 until 2016. He also served as Boston's interim manager for the final seven weeks of the 2015 season when manager John Farrell stepped aside for successful treatment for lymphoma. Lovullo's earlier managing career included work in the Cleveland Indians and Red Sox farm systems from 2002 to 2010.

Lovullo is from Santa Monica, California and attended University of California, Los Angeles. He played for seven MLB teams from 1988 to 1999.

== Playing career ==
Lovullo was born in Santa Monica, California, and raised in the San Fernando Valley. The youngest of four children, he has two sisters and one brother. He attended Montclair College Preparatory School in Van Nuys, California, where he was part of California Interscholastic Federation (CIF) championship baseball teams in 1981 and 1982. He was named small schools player of the year in 1983. He is sixth on the CIF all-time career runs scored list, with 142. He was also part of the CIF basketball championship team in 1981 and runner-up in 1982.

Lovullo attended the University of California, Los Angeles (UCLA). While playing college baseball for the UCLA Bruins, he was honored as first-team All-American second baseman by Baseball America, the American Baseball Coaches Association, and Sporting News in 1987. At the time of his graduation, he held the UCLA career records for home runs (51), hits (266), runs batted in (RBIs) (188), runs scored (211), walks (180), and at bats (856).

An infielder in his playing days, Lovullo was listed at 6 feet 1 inch (1.85 m) and 185 pounds (84 kg) and was a switch hitter who threw right-handed. He was first selected by the Kansas City Royals in the 27th round of the 1986 MLB draft, but did not sign. The Detroit Tigers then selected him in the fifth round of the 1987 MLB draft, and made his major-league debut with the Tigers on September 10, 1988. He also played in MLB for the New York Yankees, California Angels, Seattle Mariners, Oakland Athletics, Cleveland Indians, and Philadelphia Phillies. He appeared in his final major-league game on October 3, 1999. After his MLB career ended, Lovullo spent one season in Japan as a member of the Yakult Swallows in 2000.

Lovullo first reached the major leagues for a brief trial in September 1988, during his second professional season. Replacing Tom Brookens at third base in the late innings of a 9–4 Tiger loss to the Yankees at Yankee Stadium on September 10, he singled off Rick Rhoden in his first major-league at bat. Lovullo played one full season and parts of seven others in MLB. In his only full campaign, with the 1993 California Angels, he appeared in 116 games and collected 92 hits for a career-high .251 batting average. He was the Angels' most-used second baseman, starting in 79 of the team's 162 games. He was a teammate that season of pitcher John Farrell, and formed an association that influenced Lovullo's managerial and coaching career.

Overall, Lovullo appeared in 303 MLB games, including 133 at second base, and 67 each at first base and third base. He batted .224 (165-for-737), with 15 home runs and 60 runs batted in (RBIs). In Nippon Professional Baseball in 2000, he played in only 29 games and batted .197 with one home run and two RBIs.

Lovullo's long minor league playing career — 1,433 games with 1,193 hits, and a batting average of .267 — included extended stays with the Toledo Mud Hens, Columbus Clippers and Buffalo Bisons. He later returned to manage in both Buffalo and Columbus.

== Coaching and managing career ==
=== Minor leagues ===
Lovullo's off-field career began in the Cleveland organization in 2001 as a minor league infield coach. After Farrell joined the Indians' front office as director of player development that November, Lovullo became the manager of the 2002 Columbus (Georgia) RedStixx of the Class A South Atlantic League, and guided them to the finals of the SAL playoffs. He then moved up to the High Class A Kinston Indians (2003–04) and the Double-A Akron Aeros (2005), which he piloted to an 84–58 win–loss record and the Eastern League championship. His 2005 success led to his first MLB managerial audition, when he was invited to interview for the vacant managerial job for the Los Angeles Dodgers prior to the 2006 season. When the Dodgers settled on Grady Little for their manager position, Lovullo resumed managing in the Indians' organization as skipper of the Buffalo Bisons, the Tribe's Triple-A affiliate.

During Lovullo's playing career, he had spent all or parts of three seasons (1995; 1997–98) as a player for the Bisons and won two championships: one in the American Association and one in the International League. In 2003, he also had received the highest honor awarded to an alumnus of Buffalo baseball, as he was inducted into the Buffalo Baseball Hall of Fame, alongside his teammate from the 1997 and 1998 championship squads, Jeff Manto. In three campaigns (2006–08) as the Bisons' manager, he led the club to two winning records, and compiled a mark of 214–212. He also interviewed for the Pittsburgh Pirates' managerial vacancy after the 2007 season.

In 2009, the Indians changed their Triple-A affiliation from Buffalo to the Columbus (Ohio) Clippers of the International League. Lovullo had played for the Clippers in 1991–92 when the team was the Yankees' top farm club. The Clippers were the International League champions in both seasons Lovullo played in Columbus, winning back-to-back Governors' Cup trophies. In 2009, his only season as the Clippers' manager, the team compiled a 57–85 (.401) record, but Lovullo was recruited by the Boston Red Sox to take over their Triple-A team, the Pawtucket Red Sox, for 2010. It was his first season in the Boston organization, although both Farrell (as pitching coach) and another former Cleveland farm system official, Mike Hazen (as director of player development), were playing key roles with the Red Sox. Lovullo's 2010 PawSox finished 66–78 (.458) and out of the playoffs, fourth in the Northern Division of the International League.

During his minor league managing career, Lovullo was named "Manager of the Year" in both the Carolina League (2004) and the Eastern League (2005). For the latter season, he also was named Double-A Manager of the Year by Baseball America. His nine-year (2002–10) win–loss record as a minor league manager is 661–609 (.520).

=== Major league coach ===
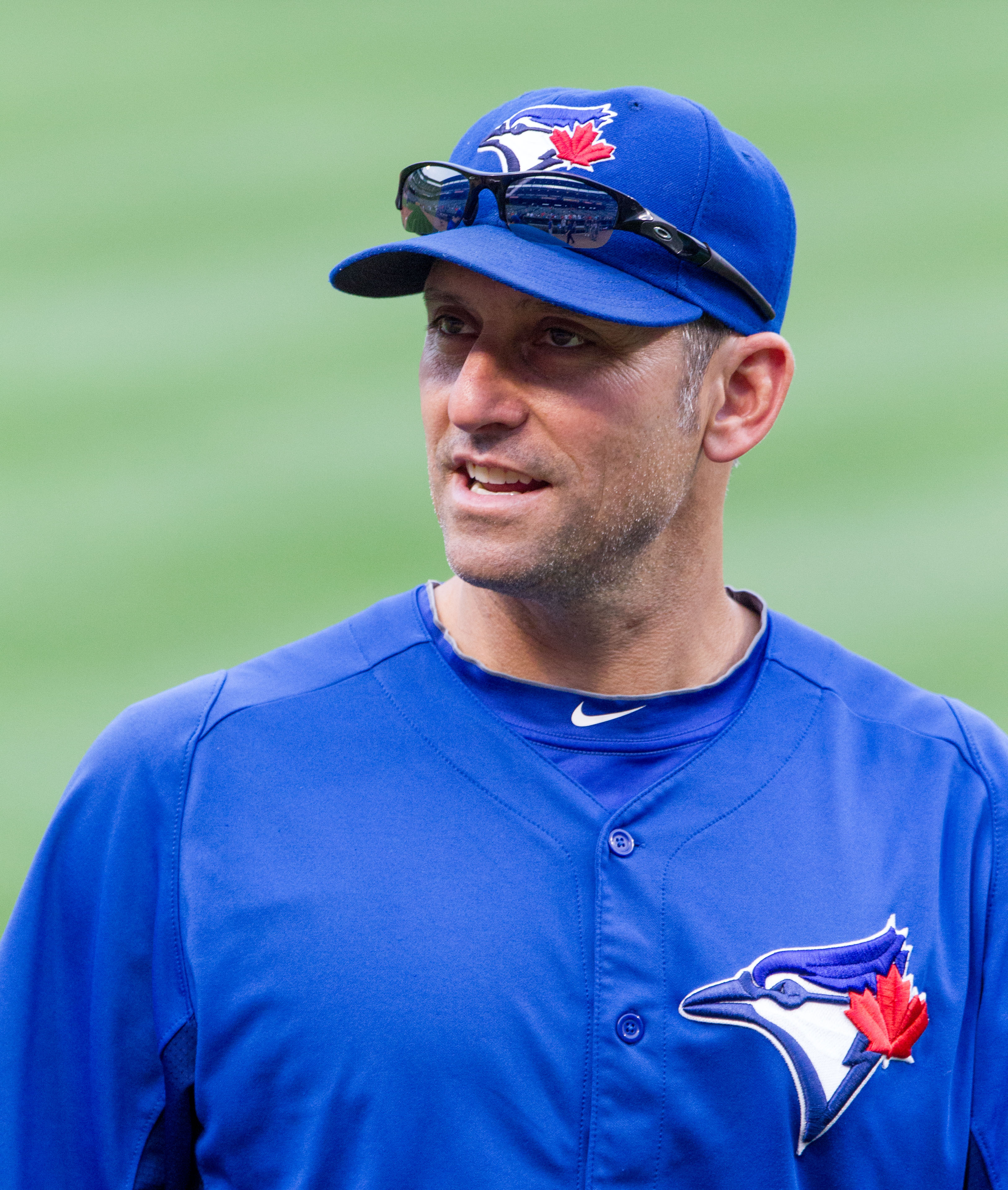
Lovullo 2012

At the close of the 2010 season, Farrell, then considered a top Major League managerial candidate, was hired as the manager of the Toronto Blue Jays for 2011. He named Lovullo to his Toronto coaching staff on November 8, to replace Omar Malavé as the club's first-base coach. Lovullo then served two seasons in that capacity.

After the 2012 season, the Red Sox began negotiations with the Blue Jays to release Farrell from his contract so that he could return to Boston as manager for 2013. Ultimately, the Red Sox acquired the rights to Farrell in an October 21 trade for infielder Mike Avilés. Upon being named the Red Sox' manager, Farrell hired Lovullo on October 26, 2012 as his bench coach. After the Red Sox won the 2013 World Series, Lovullo was mentioned as a potential candidate to succeed Dale Sveum as manager of the Chicago Cubs for 2014, but he returned as Boston's bench coach. Then, upon the close of the 2014 season, Lovullo interviewed for managerial openings with the Texas Rangers and Minnesota Twins but was a runner-up in each case.

=== Interim manager ===
On August 11, 2015, Farrell underwent hernia surgery, leaving Lovullo in charge of the team. Three days later, Farrell announced that during the surgery, it was found that he had Stage 1 lymphoma. The Red Sox named Lovullo manager for the remainder of the 2015 season while Farrell underwent chemotherapy.

The Red Sox showed a significant improvement in performance under Lovullo, scoring 37 runs in their first 2 games after he took over. The team had a win–loss record of 28–20 (.583) from August 14, 2015, through the end of the season, better than the team's overall 78–84 record. A high point came near the end of the season when the Red Sox posted a six-game winning streak and moved up to third place in the AL East. However, the team lost their last four games and ultimately finished at the bottom of their division for the second year in a row.

On October 1, it was reported that, if healthy, Farrell would return to his position as Red Sox manager at the beginning of the 2016 season, leaving Lovullo's position with the organization uncertain after his performance as interim manager. It was announced on October 4 that Lovullo would resume his bench coach duties for the 2016 season on, with Farrell returning as manager. Lovullo was also given a two-year contract extension in exchange for forgoing his right to pursue managerial job offerings. The 2016 season was Lovullo's fourth consecutive season with the Red Sox and his sixth straight overall as an aide to Farrell.

=== Arizona Diamondbacks ===
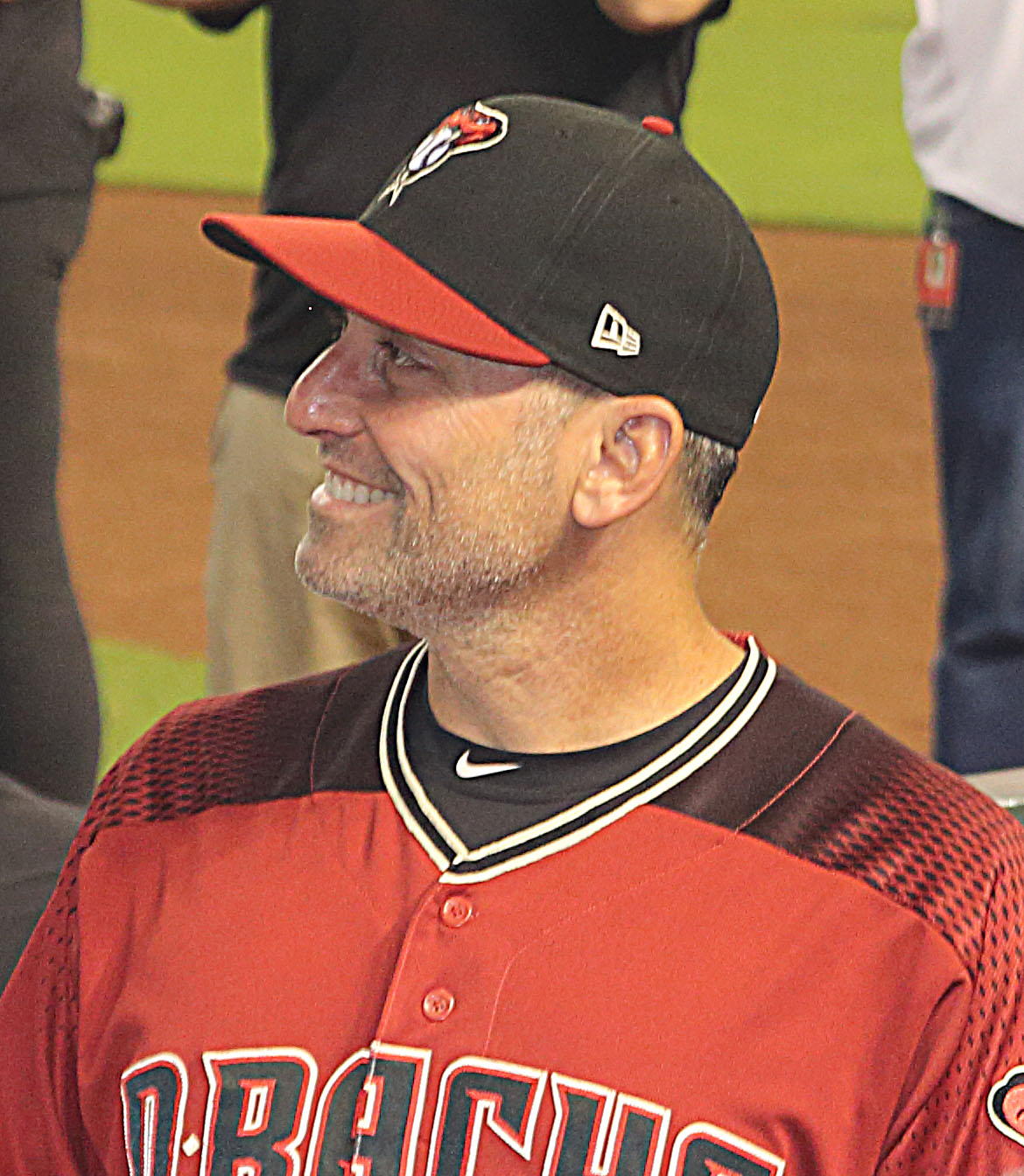
Lovullo in 2017

Mike Hazen, who had worked with Lovullo with both the Indians and Red Sox, was named the new general manager of the Arizona Diamondbacks on October 16, 2016. Almost three weeks later, on November 4, Hazen appointed Lovullo to replace Chip Hale as the Diamondbacks manager. Hazen hired Lovullo over finalist Phil Nevin. In his first season as manager, Lovullo guided the team to the postseason, winning the National League (NL) Wild Card Game and finishing with a record of 93 wins and 69 losses, a 24-game improvement for the team from 2016. For his efforts, Lovullo was named 2017 NL Manager of the Year.

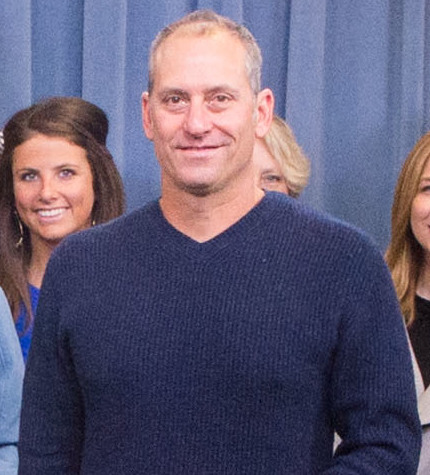
Lovullo at the Pentagon with the Diamondbacks in 2018

On April 7, 2018, Lovullo was ejected in the second inning of a game against the St. Louis Cardinals after an argument with umpire Tim Timmons resulted in a fight with Cardinals catcher Yadier Molina, with Lovullo swearing in reference to Molina. The Diamondbacks won that game, 4–1, Lovullo's 100th managerial victory, making him the fastest manager in Diamondbacks history to win 100 games with the team. Lovullo and Molina were suspended for a game.

In January 2019, Lovullo and the Diamondbacks agreed to a two-year contract extension, through the 2021 season. Following a 9–3 win over the New York Mets, Lovullo passed Kirk Gibson as the all time winningest manger in Diamondback history with 354 wins. The team announced a second extension for Lovullo on September 23, 2021, through the 2022 season.

On June 4, 2023, after the Diamondbacks got out to a 35–24 record (tied for best in the NL), Lovullo was signed to a one–year extension that runs through the 2024 season. Despite an 84–78 record, the team won the NL pennant and lost in the World Series. After the postseason, he signed a contract extension through 2026.

Following the 2026 season in which the team finished with an 86–76 record, the Diamondbacks announced that Lovullo would sign a two year contract extension through the 2028 season. He is currently the third longest tenured manager in the MLB, only behind Kevin Cash of the Rays and Dave Roberts of the Dodgers.

=== Managerial records ===
As of 2026 season

Team	Year	Regular season					Postseason			
Team	Year	Games	Won	Lost	Win %	Finish	Won	Lost	Win %	Result
ARI	2017	162	93	69	.574	2nd in NL West	1	3	.250	Lost NLDS (LAD)
ARI	2018	162	82	80	.506	3rd in NL West	–	–	–	
ARI	2019	162	85	77	.525	2nd in NL West	–	–	–	
ARI	2020	60	25	35	.417	5th in NL West	–	–	–	
ARI	2021	162	52	110	.321	5th in NL West	–	–	–	
ARI	2022	162	74	88	.457	4th in NL West	–	–	–	
ARI	2023	162	84	78	.519	2nd in NL West	10	7	.588	Lost World Series (TEX)
ARI	2024	162	89	73	.549	3rd in NL West	–	–	–	
ARI	2025	162	80	82	.494	4th in NL West	–	–	–	
ARI	2026	162	86	76	.531	3rd in NL West	–	–	–	
ARI	2027									
Total		1,518	750	768	.494		11	10	.524	

== Personal life ==
Lovullo's father, Sam, was a producer of the long-running syndicated television country comedy variety show Hee Haw and its spinoff series Hee Haw Honeys. Sam was the producer of many other television shows and specials. Before his death in 2017, Sam was the recipient of many awards for his innovative production methods in television. He also received many awards in his lifetime for his contributions to several organizations, including receiving the Italian Federation's man of the year award.

Lovullo has one daughter and two sons. Two children are from his first marriage and his youngest child is from his second marriage. His son Nick Lovullo played baseball professionally as an infielder from 2013–2021 and is currently serving as a bench coach for the Chicago Cubs Triple-A affiliate Iowa Cubs.

== See also ==
- Arizona Diamondbacks award winners and league leaders
- List of Major League Baseball managerial wins and winning percentage leaders
- List of Major League Baseball managers with most career ejections

Sporting positions
Preceded by Brad Komminsk	Akron Aeros manager 2005	Succeeded by Tim Bogar
Preceded by Marty Brown	Buffalo Bisons manager 2006–2008	Succeeded by Ken Oberkfell
Preceded by Tim Foli	Columbus Clippers manager 2009	Succeeded by Mike Sarbaugh
Preceded by Ron Johnson	Pawtucket Red Sox manager 2010	Succeeded by Arnie Beyeler
Preceded by Omar Malavé	Toronto Blue Jays first-base coach 2011–2012	Succeeded by Dwayne Murphy
Preceded by Tim Bogar	Boston Red Sox bench coach 2013–2016	Succeeded by Gary DiSarcina
