= Arnie Beyeler =

American baseball player

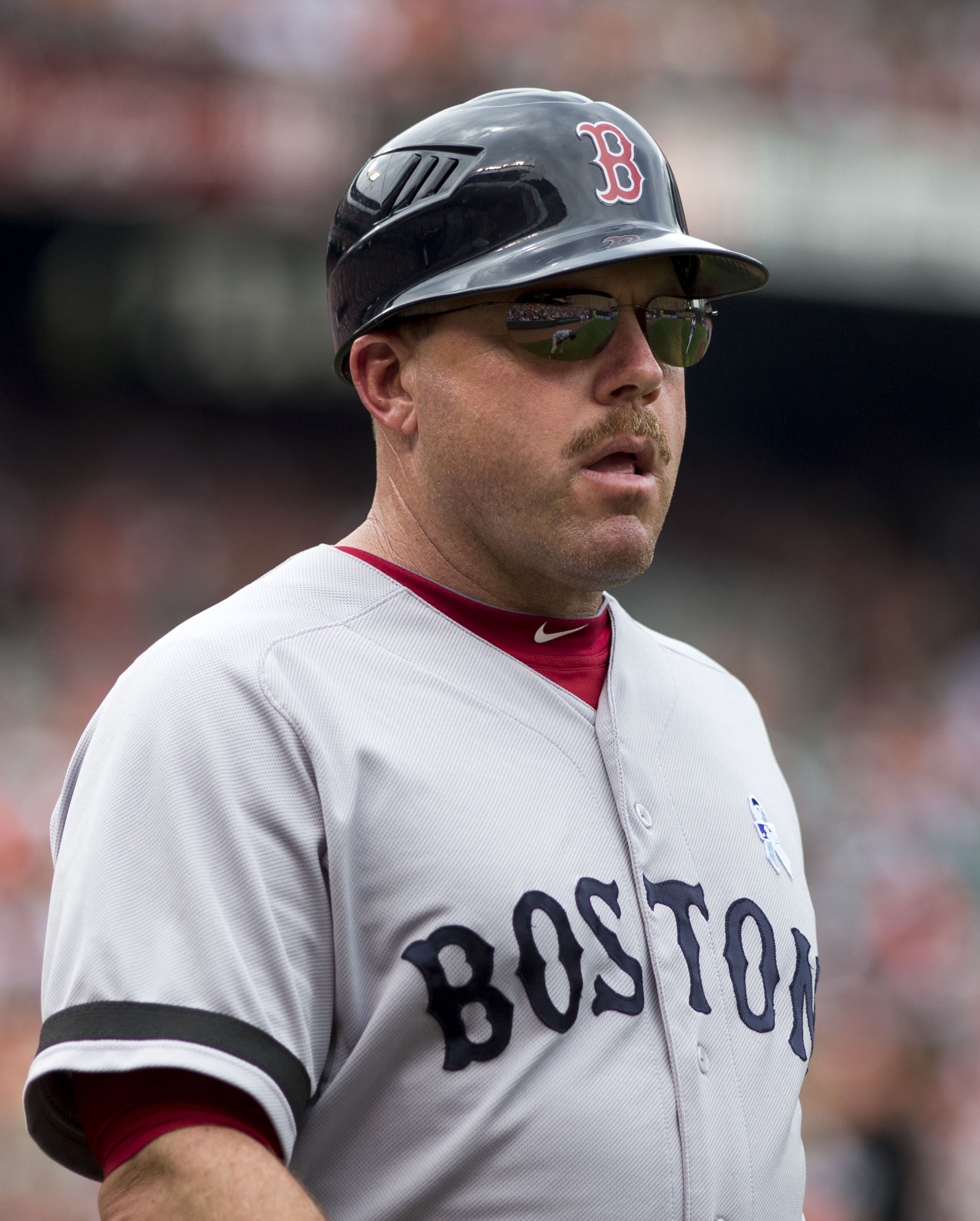
- Beyeler as a Red Sox coach in 2013
- Coach
- Born: February 13, 1964 (age 62); Moab, Utah, U.S.
- Bats: Right Throws: Right
- Stats at Baseball Reference

Teams
- Boston Red Sox (2013–2015); Baltimore Orioles (2019)

Career highlights and awards
- World Series champion (2013)

Arnold H. Beyeler (born February 13, 1964) is an American professional baseball coach and a former player and manager.

== Playing career ==
Beyeler, a native of Moab, Utah, graduated from Grand County High School, Lamar Community College, and Wichita State University, where he played varsity baseball and majored in communications. A second baseman and shortstop in professional baseball, he threw and batted right-handed, and stood 5 feet 5 inches (1.65 m) tall and weighed 195 pounds (88 kg). Beyeler played six seasons (1986–91) in the Detroit Tigers farm system, compiling a batting average of .254 with 69 stolen bases in 584 games played, including 29 games with the Triple-A Toledo Mud Hens in 1991.

== Scout, manager and coach ==
After his retirement as an active player, Beyeler began his off-field career as a Florida-based area scout for the Tigers (1992–96). He then spent three seasons, 1997–99, in the New York Yankees organization as a batting and infield coach for the Double-A Norwich Navigators and the Triple-A Columbus Clippers. In 2000 he joined the Boston Red Sox system for the first time as manager of the Lowell Spinners (2000–01) of the Short Season-A New York–Penn League and the Augusta GreenJackets (2002) of the Class A South Atlantic League. When an ownership change in Boston resulted in a turnover of the player development department, Beyeler departed for the Texas Rangers organization, managing the Stockton Ports (2003–04) and the Bakersfield Blaze (2005) of the Class A California League. He then spent the 2006 campaign as batting coach for the Mobile BayBears, the Double-A Southern League affiliate of the San Diego Padres, before his return to the Boston organization in 2007.

He served for four seasons (2007–10) as skipper of the Portland Sea Dogs of the Eastern League, the Red Sox' Double-A affiliate. He then spent two years as pilot of the Triple-A Pawtucket Red Sox of the International League, the Red Sox' top-level minor league affiliate, from 2011–12. In his two years as manager of the Pawtucket Red Sox, Beyeler led the team to an International League North Division title in 2011 and its third Governors' Cup championship in 2012.

In his first major league assignment, Beyeler worked for three years (2013–15) as the Red Sox' first base and outfield coach, winning a 2013 World Series ring. During that season, Beyeler helped veteran centerfielder Shane Victorino convert to right field, a notoriously difficult position at Boston's home stadium, Fenway Park. When Victorino won a 2013 Gold Glove for defensive excellence, he invited Beyeler to the off-season awards ceremony in New York as his guest. During 2014–15, Beyeler successfully converted infielders Mookie Betts and Brock Holt into outfielders. The conversion helped Holt improve his versatility as a utilityman. Betts, however, became a regular. He was the Red Sox' starting centerfielder in 2015; then, moving to right field a year later, he won multiple Gold Gloves (2016–18 inclusive) and the Wilson Defensive Player of the Year Award in 2016. But veteran shortstop Hanley Ramírez' conversion to leftfielder was a disaster in 2015, and Boston released Beyeler on October 4, 2015.

After leaving the Red Sox, Beyeler managed the New Orleans Baby Cakes (formerly Zephyrs) of the Pacific Coast League (PCL), Triple-A affiliate of the Miami Marlins, from 2016 through 2018. After three seasons as pilot, his contract was not renewed for 2019. He posted a 193–223 win–loss record, with one playoff appearance, in his three years with New Orleans. Through 2018, in 15 years as a minor league manager, Beyeler compiled a record of 995 wins and 979 losses (.504).

In January 2019, Beyeler was announced as the Baltimore Orioles' first base and outfield coach on the staff of manager Brandon Hyde. He was not retained by the ballclub following the 2019 season. On January 21, 2020, the Detroit Tigers announced that Beyeler would be managing their AA affiliate, the Erie SeaWolves.

He resides in Ponte Vedra Beach, Florida, spends his summers at his residence in Kenner, Louisiana and winters at his cross country ski lodge in Minneapolis, Minnesota.

Sporting positions
Preceded by Todd Claus	Portland Sea Dogs manager 2007–2010	Succeeded by Kevin Boles
Preceded by Torey Lovullo	Pawtucket Red Sox manager 2011–2012	Succeeded by Gary DiSarcina
Preceded by Alex Ochoa	Boston Red Sox first-base coach 2013–2015	Succeeded by Rubén Amaro Jr.
Preceded by Andy Haines	New Orleans Zephyrs/Baby Cakes manager 2016–2018	Succeeded by Keith Johnson
Preceded by Wayne Kirby	Baltimore Orioles first-base coach 2019	Succeeded by Incumbent
