= Doug Rader =

American baseball player and manager (born 1944)

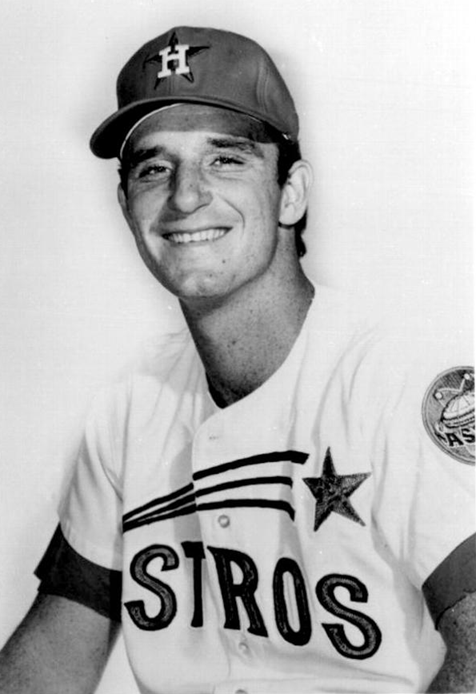
- Rader in 1971 for Houston Astros
- Third baseman / Manager
- Born: July 30, 1944 (age 82); Chicago, Illinois, U.S.
- Batted: Right Threw: Right

MLB debut
- July 31, 1967, for the Houston Astros

Last MLB appearance
- October 2, 1977, for the Toronto Blue Jays

MLB statistics
- Batting average: .251
- Home runs: 155
- Runs batted in: 722
- Managerial record: 388–417
- Winning %: .482
- Stats at Baseball Reference
- Managerial record at Baseball Reference

Teams
- As player: Houston Astros (1967–1975); San Diego Padres (1976–1977); Toronto Blue Jays (1977); As manager: Texas Rangers (1983–1985); Chicago White Sox (1986); California Angels (1989–1991); As coach: San Diego Padres (1979); Chicago Cubs (1986–1987)

Career highlights and awards
- 5× Gold Glove Award (1970–1974)

Douglas Lee Rader (born July 30, 1944), nicknamed "the Red Rooster", is an American former manager, coach, and third baseman in Major League Baseball (MLB) who was known primarily for his defensive ability, winning five straight Gold Glove Awards from 1970 to 1974.

Rader's career lasted from 1967 to 1977, playing for the Houston Astros, San Diego Padres, and Toronto Blue Jays, then later managed the Texas Rangers, Chicago White Sox, and California Angels between 1983 and 1991.

Also nicknamed "Rojo", Rader earned his nickname "the Red Rooster" from the thick head of red hair which always protruded from under his cap.

== Early life and college ==
Rader was born on July 30, 1944, in Chicago. He attended Glenbrook North High School in Northbrook, Illinois, and Illinois Wesleyan University. He played shortstop for Illinois Wesleyan’s baseball team in 1963-64. He also played shortstop in the summers of 1963-64 in the Central Illinois Collegiate League for the Bloomington Bobcats.

== Playing career ==
Rader was signed out of Bloomington by the Houston Astros as an amateur undrafted free agent in 1965. The Astros had scouted him in 1964 and paid him a $25,000 signing bonus to sign with them.

=== Minor leagues ===
In 1965, he was assigned to the Single-A Durham Bulls, where his batting average was only .209. In 1966, he played for the Double-A Amarillo Sonics, raising his batting average to .290, with 16 home runs, 85 runs scored, 74 runs batted in (RBI) and an .819 OPS (on-base plus slugging). He began the 1967 season with the Triple-A Oklahoma City 89ers, playing 75 games with a .293 average before being called up to the Astros that year. He played third base for all three teams.

=== Houston Astros (1967–1975) ===
He made his Major League Baseball debut with the club on July 31, 1967. In his first game against the New York Mets, Rader earned his first career hit, a single against Canadian-born reliever Ron Taylor, as his Astros won the game 3-2. On August 19, Rader hit his first career home run against Dick Hughes of the St. Louis Cardinals. He played a majority of his games at first base, and finished the season with a .333 batting average with four home runs and 26 runs batted in (RBI) in 47 games.

During the 1968 season, the Astros moved Rader over to play third base, and in 98 games, Rader hit .267 with six home runs and 43 RBIs in establishing himself as their everyday third baseman during the second half of the season.

In 1969, Rader played in 155 games with Houston, hitting .246 with eleven home runs and 83 RBIs. He had a breakout season in 1970, as Rader appeared in 156 games, hitting .252, and was second on the Astros with 25 home runs and third on the club with 87 runs batted in. Rader earned his first career Gold Glove Award as being the best defensive third baseman in the National League.

Rader struggled offensively during the 1971 season, as he hit .244 with twelve home runs and 56 RBI in 135 games, however, he earned his second consecutive Gold Glove Award at third base. In 1972, Rader's batting average continued to slip, as he hit .237, however, his power numbers came back, as he hit 22 home runs and 90 RBI in 152 games to be among the Astros team leaders, winning his third straight Gold Glove Award. He was the subject of an article in the June 16 issue of LIFE that year.

Rader had another solid season in 1973, hitting .254 with 21 home runs and 89 RBI in 154 games with Houston, and once again was awarded the Gold Glove Award for third base, for the fourth straight season. He continued his solid play throughout the 1974 season, hitting .257, his highest batting average since 1968, while hitting seventeen home runs and 78 RBI, earning his fifth consecutive Gold Glove Award.

In 1975, Rader's offensive numbers slipped, as he hit only .223 with twelve home runs and 48 RBI in 129 games, and for the first time since 1969, he failed to win the Gold Glove Award, as Ken Reitz of the St. Louis Cardinals received the award.

=== San Diego Padres (1976–1977) ===
Rader was traded to the San Diego Padres for Larry Hardy and Joe McIntosh on December 11, 1975. The Padres needed a veteran starting third baseman at the time. Rader became the everyday third baseman for the San Diego Padres during the 1976 season, and in 139 games hit for a .257 average with nine home runs and 55 runs batted in. His nine home runs were the lowest total of his career since the 1968 season.

In 1977, Rader began the season with San Diego and in 52 games hit .271 with five home runs and 27 RBI. On June 8, Rader's contract was purchased by the Toronto Blue Jays.

=== Toronto Blue Jays (1977) ===
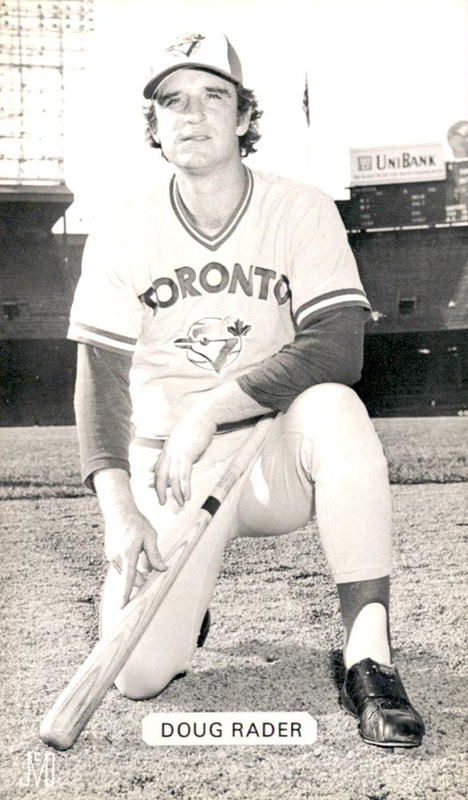
Rader in 1977 postcard for Toronto Blue Jays

Rader finished the 1977 season with the Toronto Blue Jays, where he split his time playing third base and as their designated hitter. In 96 games with Toronto, Rader hit .240 with thirteen home runs and 40 RBI. On March 18, 1978, midway through spring training, the Blue Jays released Rader, who would then retire from the game. Rader had asked for his release.

=== Major League Career (1967–1977) ===
Rader played in 1,465 games during his career, in which he collected 1,302 hits, and had a batting average of .251 with 155 home runs and 722 runs batted in. He won five straight Gold Glove Awards for his defensive play at third base from 1970 to 1974.

== Managing and coaching career ==
=== San Diego Padres (1979) and Hawaii Islanders (1980–1982) ===
After working a year for them as a major league coach, the San Diego Padres named Rader manager of their AAA affiliate, the Hawaii Islanders of the Pacific Coast League. During 1980, Rader led the club to a 76–65 record as the Islanders finished in second place in the North Division. In 1981, Hawaii had a 72–65 record, and once again finished in second place. The Islanders moved to the South Division in 1982, however, the club finished in third place with a 73–71 record.

=== Texas Rangers (1983–1985) ===
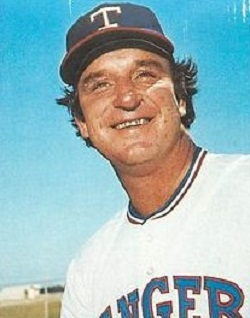
Rader in 1983 card for Texas Rangers

Rader was hired to manage the Texas Rangers in November 1982, taking over from Darrell Johnson. In his first season with the Rangers, the club finished 77–85, which was a 13-game improvement from the previous season, as Texas finished in third place in the AL West.

The Rangers slipped back into last place in 1984, as the club struggled to a 69–92 record. In 1985, the Rangers began the season 9–23, as Rader was fired and replaced with Bobby Valentine.

=== Chicago White Sox (1986) ===
In 1986, the Chicago White Sox began the season with Tony La Russa as their manager, however, after a 26–38 start, the White Sox fired LaRussa and named Rader, who was the team's hitting instructor at the time, as the interim manager. In his two games managing the White Sox, the club had a 1–1 record. The White Sox then named Jim Fregosi as their permanent manager.

=== California Angels (1989–1991) ===
Rader was hired to become the California Angels manager beginning in 1989, after the Angels finished the 1988 season with a 75–87 record, and fired manager Cookie Rojas late in the season. In his first season with the Angels, Rader led the team to a 16-game improvement, as California finished the season with a 91–71 record, good for third place in the AL West. Rader finished fourth in the AL Manager of the Year Award, which was won by Frank Robinson of the Baltimore Orioles.

In 1990, the Angels slipped under the .500 level, as the club finished 80–82 to finish fourth in the AL West. The Angels continued to hover around the .500 mark during the 1991 season, however, after a 61–63 start, Rader was fired and replaced with Buck Rodgers.

=== Florida Marlins (1993–1994) ===
Rader was hired to be the original hitting coach for the expansion Florida Marlins in November 1992. Rader resigned from the position at the end of the 1994 season.

== Personal life ==
Rader is the grandfather of National Women's Soccer League (NWSL) player Kat Rader.

== Managerial record ==
Team	Year	Regular season					Postseason			
Team	Year	Games	Won	Lost	Win %	Finish	Won	Lost	Win %	Result
TEX	1983	162	77	85	.475	3rd in AL West	–	–	–	–
TEX	1984	161	69	92	.429	7th in AL West	–	–	–	–
TEX	1985	32	9	23	.281	fired	–	–	–	–
TEX total		355	155	200	.437		0	0	–	
CWS	1986	2	1	1	.500	interim	–	–	–	–
CWS total		2	1	1	.500		0	0	–	
CAL	1989	162	91	71	.562	3rd in AL West	–	–	–	–
CAL	1990	162	80	82	.494	4th in AL West	–	–	–	–
CAL	1991	124	61	63	.492	fired	–	–	–	–
CAL total		448	232	216	.518		0	0	–	
Total		805	388	417	.482		0	0	–	

== See also ==
- Houston Astros award winners and league leaders

Preceded by Team Created	Florida Marlins hitting coach 1993–1994	Succeeded by Jose Morales
