= Chuck Hernandez =

American baseball player and coach (born 1960)

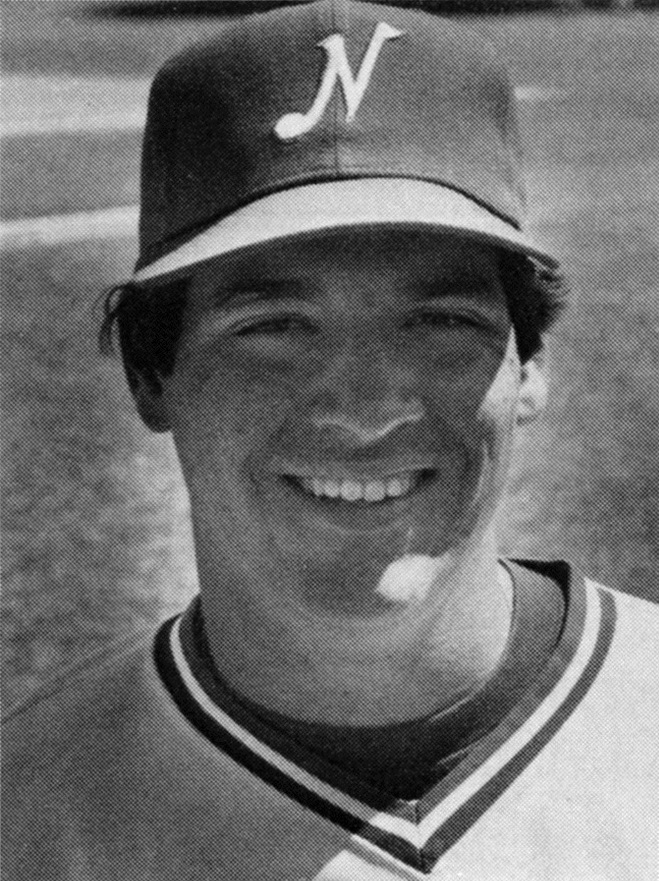
- Hernandez with the Nashville Sounds in 1983

New England Knockouts
- Coach
- Born: November 11, 1960 (age 65); Tampa, Florida, U.S.
- Bats: Left Throws: Left
- Stats at Baseball Reference

Teams
- California Angels (1993–1996); Tampa Bay Devil Rays (2004–2005); Detroit Tigers (2006–2008); Cleveland Indians (2009); Miami Marlins (2013–2015); Atlanta Braves (2017–2018); New York Mets (2019)

Carlo Amado Hernandez (born November 11, 1960) is an American professional baseball coach. He has coached in Major League Baseball (MLB) for the California Angels, Tampa Bay Devil Rays, Detroit Tigers, Cleveland Indians, Miami Marlins, Atlanta Braves, and New York Mets.

== Career ==
Prior to his coaching career, he played in the New York Yankees minor league system from 1979 to 1983. He also played part of the 1983 season in the Chicago White Sox system. A broken arm that year ended his playing career.

Hernandez has served as pitching coach for the California Angels (1993–96), Tampa Bay Devil Rays (2004–05), and Detroit Tigers (2006–08). In 2009, he served as the bullpen coach for the Cleveland Indians, but was fired along with Manager Eric Wedge and the rest of the staff at the season's end. After the 2010 season, the University of South Florida hired Hernandez as their pitching coach.

Hernandez was then pitching coach for the GCL Phillies and then the Miami Marlins. In November 2015 he was hired as Minor League pitching coordinator for the Atlanta Braves. On October 11, 2016, Hernandez was named the pitching coach for the Atlanta Braves. On October 15, 2018, Hernandez was dismissed from his duties as the pitching coach for the Braves.

On December 9, 2018, the New York Mets hired Hernandez as their bullpen coach. His time in New York was short-lived, however; on June 20, 2019, he, along with pitching coach Dave Eiland, were fired as part of a staff shakeup.

On January 30, 2024, Hernandez was announced as a pitching consultant for the New England Knockouts of the Frontier League.

Sporting positions
Preceded by Ken Macha	California Angels bullpen coach 1992	Succeeded by Rick Turner
Preceded by Marcel Lachemann	California Angels pitching coach 1993–1996	Succeeded by Joe Coleman
Preceded by Chris Bosio	Tampa Bay Devil Rays pitching coach 2004–2005	Succeeded by Mike Butcher
Preceded by Bob Cluck	Detroit Tigers pitching coach 2006–2008	Succeeded by Rick Knapp
Preceded by Luis Isaac	Cleveland Indians bullpen coach 2009	Succeeded by Scott Radinsky
Preceded by Randy St. Claire	Miami Marlins pitching coach 2013–2015	Succeeded by Juan Nieves
Preceded by Roger McDowell	Atlanta Braves pitching coach 2017–2018	Succeeded by Rick Kranitz
Preceded by Ricky Bones	New York Mets bullpen coach 2019	Succeeded by Ricky Bones
