= Reggie Williams (1990s outfielder) =

American baseball player (born 1966)

- Outfielder
- Born: May 5, 1966 (age 59); Laurens, South Carolina, U.S.
- Batted: Both Threw: Right

MLB debut
- September 8, 1992, for the California Angels

Last MLB appearance
- July 25, 1999, for the Anaheim Angels

MLB statistics
- Batting average: .250
- Home runs: 2
- Runs batted in: 14
- Stats at Baseball Reference

Teams
- California Angels (1992); Los Angeles Dodgers (1995); Anaheim Angels (1998–1999)

Reginald Bernard Williams (born May 5, 1966) is an American former professional baseball outfielder. He played in Major League Baseball (MLB) for the California / Anaheim Angels and Los Angeles Dodgers. He played college baseball at USC Salkehatchie and later at USC Aiken.

== Amateur career ==
Reggie Williams played for the USC Aiken Pacers in the 1987 and 1988 seasons. He was drafted by the San Francisco Giants in the 25th round of the 1988 MLB draft.

== Professional career ==
=== San Francisco Giants ===
Williams signed with the San Francisco Giants on June 6, 1988 and was assigned to Low-A where he appeared in 60 games and had a .251 batting average with 3 home runs, 29 runs batted in (RBI) and 36 stolen bases in 223 at bats. On June 20, 1989, Williams was released by the Giants after appearing in 68 Single-A games and hitting .195 with 3 home runs, 18 RBIs and 14 stolen bases in 236 at bats.

=== California Angels ===
On February 15, 1990, Williams signed as a free agent with the California Angels. He made his MLB debut with the Angels on September 8, 1992. He appeared in 14 games and had a .231 batting average in 26 at bats during the 1992 MLB season.

=== Los Angeles Dodgers ===
On October 26, 1993, Williams was traded by the California Angels to the Los Angeles Dodgers for pitcher Mike James. Williams played briefly with the Dodgers during the 1995 MLB season appearing in 15 games. He remained in the Dodgers organization through 1996.

=== Anaheim Angels ===
On August 19, 1997, Williams' contract was purchased by the Anaheim Angels from Monterrey of the Mexican League. He appeared for the Angels in 29 games and had a .361 batting average with 1 home run, 5 RBIs, and 3 stolen bases in 36 at bats during the 1998 MLB season. On August 31, 1999, Williams was released by the Angels after appearing in 30 games and hitting .222 with 1 home run, 6 RBIs, and 2 stolen bases in 63 at bats that season.

== Post-playing career ==
Williams currently resides in Tampa, Florida. He coaches competitive travel baseball teams from ages 10–18 called The Dawg Pound. His baseball facility is called Dream Makers. All of the coaches that are in the program have coached or played Major League Baseball.

On April 18, 2010 he was inducted into the USC Salkehatchie Athletic Hall of Fame.

On March 3, 2022, Williams was hired as the manager for the Brockton Rox of the Futures Collegiate Baseball League (FCBL).
