= Rick Turner (archaeologist) =

English archaeologist

Richard Charles Turner OBE (24 April 1952 – 27 June 2018) was county archaeologist for Cheshire and later worked for the Inspectorate of Ancient Monuments and Historical Buildings in Wales. At Cheshire he was responsible for saving the remains of Lindow Man.
