= Paul Swingle =

American baseball player (born 1966)

- Pitcher
- Born: December 21, 1966 (age 59); Inglewood, California, U.S.
- Batted: Right Threw: Right

MLB debut
- September 7, 1993, for the California Angels

Last MLB appearance
- September 27, 1993, for the California Angels

MLB statistics
- Win–loss record: 0–1
- Earned run average: 8.38
- Strikeouts: 6
- Stats at Baseball Reference

Teams
- California Angels (1993)

Paul Christopher Swingle (born December 21, 1966) is an American former Major League Baseball pitcher who played in 1993 with the California Angels. He batted and threw right-handed. Swingle had a 0–1 record, with an 8.38 ERA, in nine games, in his one season in the major leagues.

Swingle was drafted by the Angels in the 29th round of the 1989 draft out of Grand Canyon University. Prior to his time at Grand Canyon, he attended Chapman University and Mesa Community College. He went to high school at Dobson High School.
