= Greg Myers (baseball) =

American baseball player (born 1966)

- Catcher
- Born: April 14, 1966 (age 60); Riverside, California, U.S.
- Batted: Left Threw: Right

MLB debut
- September 12, 1987, for the Toronto Blue Jays

Last MLB appearance
- April 22, 2005, for the Toronto Blue Jays

MLB statistics
- Batting average: .255
- Home runs: 87
- Runs batted in: 396
- Stats at Baseball Reference

Teams
- Toronto Blue Jays (1987, 1989–1992); California Angels (1992–1995); Minnesota Twins (1996–1997); Atlanta Braves (1997); San Diego Padres (1998–1999); Atlanta Braves (1999); Baltimore Orioles (2000–2001); Oakland Athletics (2001–2002); Toronto Blue Jays (2003–2005)

Gregory Richard Myers (born April 14, 1966) is an American former professional baseball catcher. He played 18 seasons in Major League Baseball (MLB) for the Toronto Blue Jays, California Angels, Minnesota Twins, Atlanta Braves, San Diego Padres, Baltimore Orioles, and Oakland Athletics.

In 1993, Myers was Nolan Ryan's 5,714th — and last — strikeout victim. In 2003, Myers rejuvenated his career with the Blue Jays, returning as a starting catcher. That year, he hit .307, with 15 home runs, and 52 runs batted in (RBI). In 2004, Myers suffered an injury when he slid into second base during a game against the Minnesota Twins at the Metrodome. He was out for the entire year and decided to retire after the 2005 season.
