= Mike Butcher (baseball) =

American baseball player and coach (born 1965)

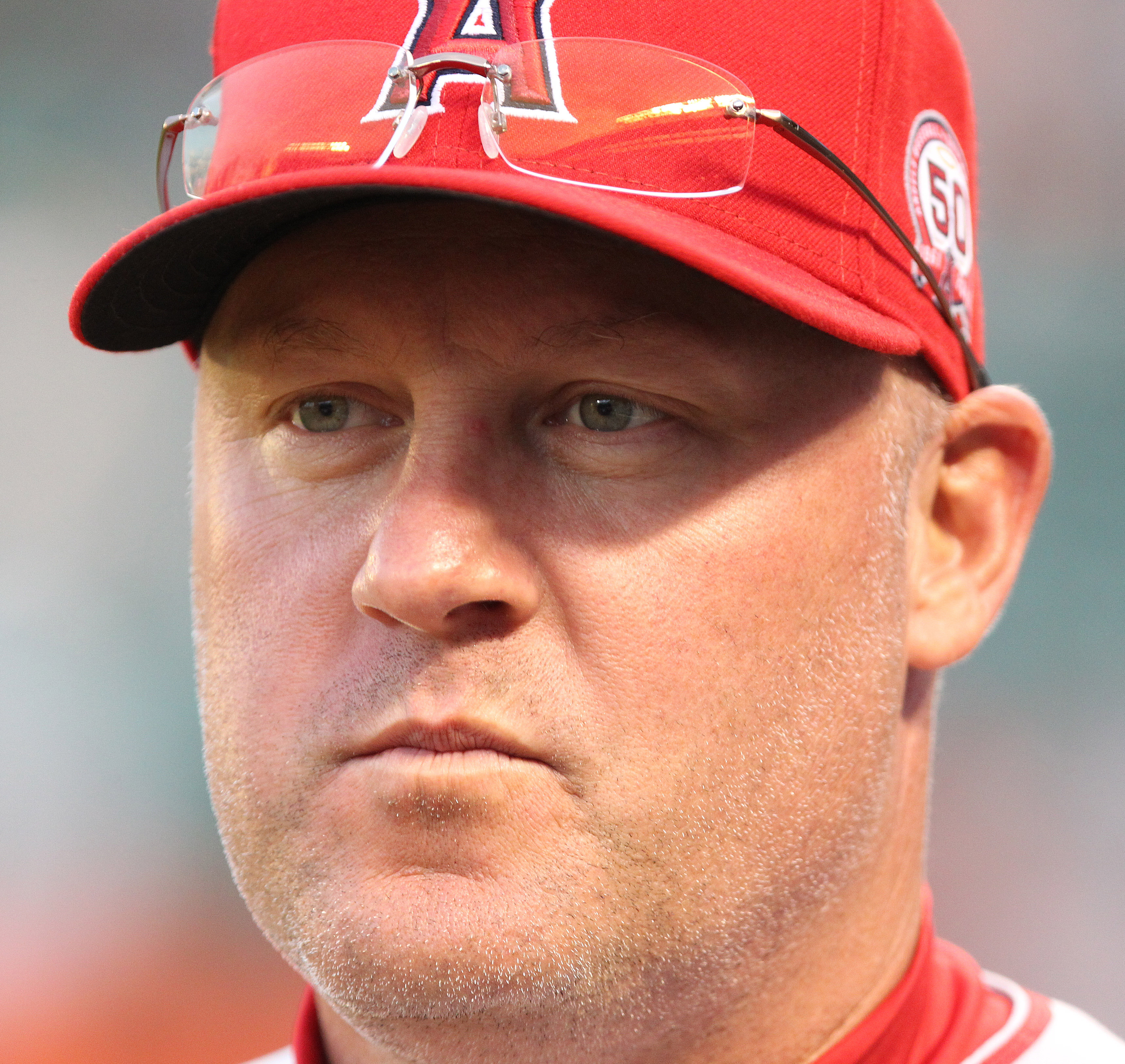
- Butcher with the Los Angeles Angels of Anaheim
- Pitcher
- Born: May 10, 1965 (age 60); Davenport, Iowa, U.S.
- Batted: Right Threw: Right

MLB debut
- July 6, 1992, for the California Angels

Last MLB appearance
- September 5, 1995, for the California Angels

MLB statistics
- Win–loss record: 11–4
- Earned run average: 4.47
- Strikeouts: 96
- Stats at Baseball Reference

Teams
- As player: California Angels (1992–1995); As coach: Tampa Bay Devil Rays (2006); Los Angeles Angels of Anaheim (2007–2015); Arizona Diamondbacks (2016–2019)

Michael Dana Butcher (born May 10, 1965) is an American professional baseball pitcher and coach. He played in Major League Baseball for the California Angels from 1992 to 1995. He served as the pitching coach for the Tampa Bay Rays in 2006, for the Angels from 2007 through 2015, and was previously the pitching coach for the Arizona Diamondbacks.

== Career ==
Butcher graduated from United Township High School in East Moline, Illinois in 1983. attended Northeastern Oklahoma A&M College in Miami, OK. He was drafted by the Cincinnati Reds in the 4th round of the 1986 Major League Baseball draft, but did not sign. He signed with the Kansas City Royals after being drafted in the 2nd round of the 1986 June Secondary draft. Butcher was released by the Royals in 1988 and then signed as a free agent with the California Angels, with whom he made his Major League debut in 1992. Butcher played his final Major League game in 1995, although he pitched in the Seattle Mariners', Cleveland Indians' and Angels' organizations until 1998.

Butcher served as the pitching coach for the Tampa Bay Rays in 2006, and joined the Angels as their pitching coach in 2007. The Angels announced that Butcher would not be returning as the team pitching coach following the 2015 season. Prior to the 2016 season he was hired by the Arizona Diamondbacks to be their pitching coach.

Sporting positions
Preceded by Chuck Hernandez	Tampa Bay Devil Rays Pitching Coach; 2006	Succeeded by Jim Hickey
Preceded by Bud Black	Los Angeles Angels of Anaheim Pitching Coach; 2007–2015	Succeeded by Charles Nagy
Preceded by Mike Harkey	Arizona Diamondbacks Pitching Coach; 2016–2019	Succeeded by Matt Herges
