= Hilly Hathaway =

American baseball player (born 1969)

- Pitcher
- Born: September 12, 1969 (age 56); Jacksonville, Florida, U.S.
- Batted: Left Threw: Left

MLB debut
- September 8, 1992, for the California Angels

Last MLB appearance
- September 11, 1993, for the California Angels

MLB statistics
- Win–loss record: 4–3
- Earned run average: 5.29
- Strikeouts: 12
- Stats at Baseball Reference

Teams
- California Angels (1992–1993)

Hillary Houston Hathaway (born September 12, 1969) is an American former professional baseball pitcher.

== Career ==
Drafted by the California Angels in the 35th round of the 1989 Major League Baseball draft, Hathaway made his Major League Baseball debut with the Angels in September, 1992, pitching twice. He made eleven more pitching starts for the Angels in 1993.

On March 29, 1994, he was traded to the San Diego Padres for Harold Reynolds. He pitched for the Las Vegas Stars, the Padres top minor league affiliate in 1994. In 1995, his final professional season, he played for Las Vegas again and briefly for the Rancho Cucamonga Quakes.
