= Julio Valera =

Puerto Rican baseball player (born 1968)

- Pitcher
- Born: October 13, 1968 (age 57); Aguadilla, Puerto Rico
- Batted: Right Threw: Right

MLB debut
- September 1, 1990, for the New York Mets

Last MLB appearance
- July 26, 1996, for the Kansas City Royals

MLB statistics
- Win–loss record: 15–20
- Earned run average: 4.85
- Strikeouts: 179

CPBL statistics
- Win–loss record: 8–4
- Earned run average: 3.59
- Strikeouts: 69
- Stats at Baseball Reference

Teams
- New York Mets (1990–1991); California Angels (1992–1993); Kansas City Royals (1996); Uni-President Lions (1999)

Member of the Caribbean

Baseball Hall of Fame
- Induction: 2020

Julio Enrique Valera Torres (born October 13, 1968) is a Puerto Rican former professional baseball pitcher. He played in Major League Baseball (MLB) for the New York Mets, California Angels, and Kansas City Royals.

== Professional career ==
Valera signed with the New York Mets as an amateur free agent on March 6, 1986.

On April 12, 1992, the Mets traded Valera and a player to be named later (Julian Vasquez) to the California Angels in exchange for shortstop Dick Schofield.

1992 would be Valera's longest MLB season pitching in 30 games (28 starts) and throwing 188 innings with a 3.73 ERA. In 1993, Valera appeared in just 19 games (5 starts) with a 6.62 ERA and required Tommy John surgery. He spent the 1994 and 1995 seasons pitching in the Angels' farm system.

On March 18, 1996, the Kansas City Royals purchased Valera's contract from the Angels for an undisclosed amount of cash. He finished the season with a 3-2 record, appearing in 31 games (2 starts) and compiled a 6.46 ERA in 61.1 innings pitched.

On December 30, 1996, Valera signed with the Chicago Cubs but did not pitch in 1997. In 1998, Valera attempted a comeback with the New York Yankees but struggled within their farm system.
