= Steve Frey =

American baseball player (born 1963)

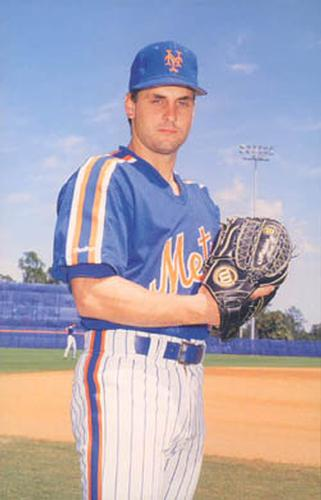
- Relief pitcher
- Born: July 29, 1963 (age 62); Meadowbrook, Pennsylvania, U.S.
- Batted: Right Threw: Left

MLB debut
- May 10, 1989, for the Montreal Expos

Last MLB appearance
- August 2, 1996, for the Philadelphia Phillies

MLB statistics
- Win–loss record: 18–15
- Earned run average: 3.76
- Strikeouts: 157
- Stats at Baseball Reference

Teams
- Montreal Expos (1989–1991); California Angels (1992–1993); San Francisco Giants (1994–1995); Seattle Mariners (1995); Philadelphia Phillies (1995–1996)

Steven Francis Frey (born July 29, 1963) is an American former professional baseball pitcher who played in Major League Baseball (MLB) for the Montreal Expos, California Angels, San Francisco Giants, Seattle Mariners, and Philadelphia Phillies, from 1989 through 1996.

Frey attended William Tennent High School in Warminster, Pennsylvania, and played three seasons of college ball at Bucks County Community College before being drafted by the New York Yankees in the fifteenth round (379th overall) of the 1983 Major League Baseball draft.

== Path to the majors ==
Frey spent five seasons in the Yankees' farm system, getting as high as triple A Columbus. On December 11, 1987, he was traded with catcher Phil Lombardi and Darren Reed to the New York Mets for Rafael Santana and Victor Garcia. After one season with the Tidewater Tides, he was traded to the Montreal Expos for Mark Bailey and Tom O'Malley. He made his major league debut with the Expos on May 10, 1989, pitching the final inning of the Expos' 10-1 victory over the Houston Astros in the Astrodome.

== California Angels ==
After three seasons in Montreal, Frey was purchased by the California Angels in Spring training 1992. It was with the Angels that Frey enjoyed his greatest success. In 1993, Frey went 2-3 with a 2.98 earned run average and a team leading thirteen saves. Unable to agree on a contract for 1994 with General Manager Whitey Herzog, Frey signed with the San Francisco Giants.

== 1994-1996 ==
Frey did not perform as well in San Francisco, going 1-0 with a 4.94 ERA and no saves in 1994. He was sent to the Seattle Mariners during the 1995 season, then released by the Mariners after only thirteen appearances. He signed with the Philadelphia Phillies for the remainder of the season, and pitched well for them down the stretch, pitching 10.2 innings and only giving up one earned run. He re-signed with Philadelphia for 1996, but spent the next three seasons in the minors before retiring.

== Post-Career ==
Frey now serves as a coach/counselor at the IMG baseball academy in Bradenton, Florida. He has been a coach there since 2004.
