= Joe Grahe =

American baseball player (born 1967)

- Pitcher
- Born: August 14, 1967 (age 57); West Palm Beach, Florida, U.S.
- Batted: Right Threw: Right

MLB debut
- August 4, 1990, for the California Angels

Last MLB appearance
- October 1, 1999, for the Philadelphia Phillies

MLB statistics
- Win–loss record: 22–30
- Earned run average: 4.41
- Strikeouts: 204
- Saves: 45
- Stats at Baseball Reference

Teams
- California Angels (1990–1994); Colorado Rockies (1995); Philadelphia Phillies (1999)

Joseph Milton Grahe (born August 14, 1967) is an American former professional baseball pitcher, who played seven seasons in Major League Baseball (MLB) for the California Angels, Colorado Rockies, and Philadelphia Phillies. His best seasons were 1992, 1993, and 1994 when he totaled 45 saves for the Angels, including 21 in 1992.

A native of West Palm Beach, Florida, Grahe played college baseball for the University of Miami. In his MLB debut against the Oakland Athletics, he struck out Jose Canseco for his first big league strikeout.

After baseball, Grahe returned to the University of Miami and earned his bachelor’s degree in business administration. He is a realtor in the Palm Beach Gardens area and has coached baseball at various levels. He and wife Michelle Gangemi-Grahe have two grown children: son Parker and daughter Mikki.
