= Dick Schofield =

American baseball player (born 1962)

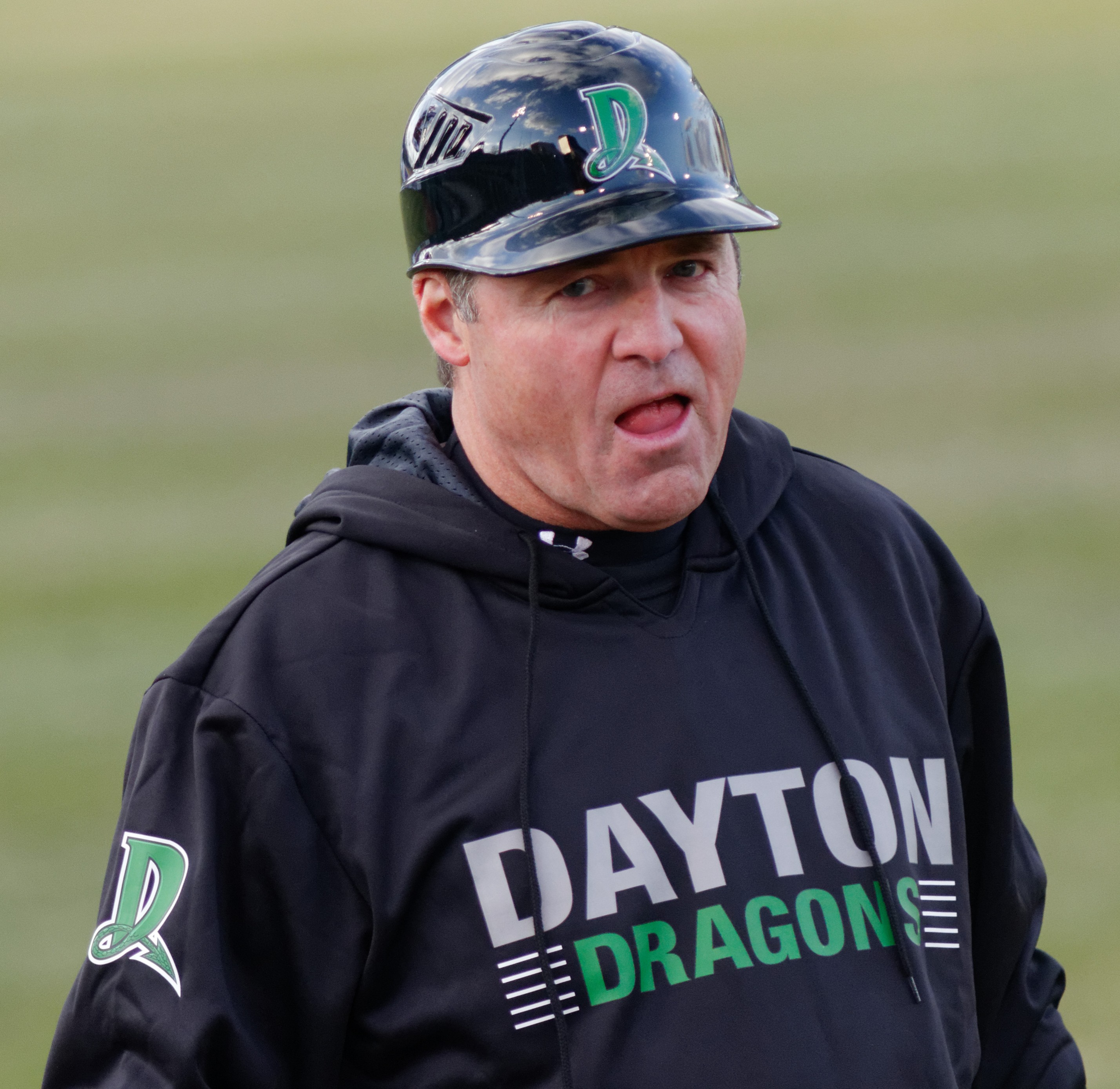
- Schofield with the Dayton Dragons in 2016
- Shortstop / Coach
- Born: November 21, 1962 (age 63); Springfield, Illinois, U.S.
- Batted: Right Threw: Right

MLB debut
- September 8, 1983, for the California Angels

Last MLB appearance
- September 29, 1996, for the California Angels

MLB statistics
- Batting average: .230
- Home runs: 56
- Runs batted in: 353
- Stats at Baseball Reference

Teams
- California Angels (1983–1992); New York Mets (1992); Toronto Blue Jays (1993–1994); Los Angeles Dodgers (1995); California Angels (1995–1996)

Career highlights and awards
- World Series champion (1993)

Richard Craig Schofield (born November 21, 1962) is an American former professional baseball shortstop and coach. He played 14 seasons in Major League Baseball (MLB) from 1983 to 1996 for the California Angels, New York Mets, Toronto Blue Jays, and Los Angeles Dodgers. Schofield was with the 1993 World Series champion Blue Jays, although did not play in the postseason after missing the bulk of the regular season when he suffered a bad break to his upper right arm. He shares the record for most seasons having at least 400 at bats with fewer than 100 hits, having done that four times.

== Professional career ==
On June 8, 1981, the California Angels drafted Schofield with the third overall pick in the 1st round of the 1981 Major League Baseball draft. On August 29, 1986, Schofield hit a walk-off grand slam home run against the Detroit Tigers to give the Angels a 13–12 victory and culminate an eight-run rally in the last of the ninth inning.

On April 12, 1992, Schofield was traded by the Angels to the New York Mets for Julio Valera and a player to be named later, who would be minor league pitcher Julian Vasquez. On January 15, 1993, Schofield signed with the Toronto Blue Jays where he played for two seasons. On April 15, 1995, Schofield signed with the Los Angeles Dodgers but would be released the following month. He signed with the Angels on August 4 after an injury to their all-star shortstop Gary DiSarcina during the team's postseason push. He returned to the Angels the following season, playing his final game on September 29, 1996.

== Coaching career ==
After retiring, Schofield took a couple of years off before venturing into coaching. He started as a coach for the River City Rascals in 1999. The next year he worked part-time as a special instructor with the Springfield Capitals. He earned a promotion in 2001 to manager and Director of Baseball Operations with the Rascals. Both of these teams played in the independent Frontier League.

Schofield moved into affiliated ball in 2002 as manager for the South Bend Silver Hawks in the Arizona Diamondbacks chain. This gig only lasted one year, followed by a four year absence from the game. When he resurfaced, Schofield joined the Los Angeles Angels of Anaheim organization. He was the hitting coach for the AZL Angels in 2007-2010. He was slated to return to that level in 2011 but was promoted to hitting coach of the Inland Empire 66ers on May 31 following the resignation of Inland manager Tom Gamboa. Schofield worked as a roving infield coordinator for the Angels in 2012.

He moved to the Cincinnati Reds chain as a hitting coach for the Pensacola Blue Wahoos in 2013 and managed the Billings Mustangs in 2014-2015. He moved up to manage the Dayton Dragons in 2016. He was bench coach of the Blue Wahoos in 2017 and started the 2018 season as the bench coach for the Louisville Bats. When manager Pat Kelly was promoted to bench coach of the parent Reds, Schofield took over as manager on April 19. He returned to the bench coach role for Louisville in 2019. Schofield was scheduled to manage the Daytona Tortugas in 2020 before the season was cancelled due to the COVID-19 pandemic. He was then development coach for Daytona in 2021 and bench coach for Louisville in 2022. He returned to Daytona as a coach in 2023.

== Personal life ==
Schofield is the son of former MLB shortstop Ducky Schofield, uncle of all-star outfielder Jayson Werth, and brother-in-law of catcher Dennis Werth.

== See also ==
- List of Major League Baseball ultimate grand slams
- Third-generation Major League Baseball families
