= Damion Easley =

American baseball player and coach (born 1969)

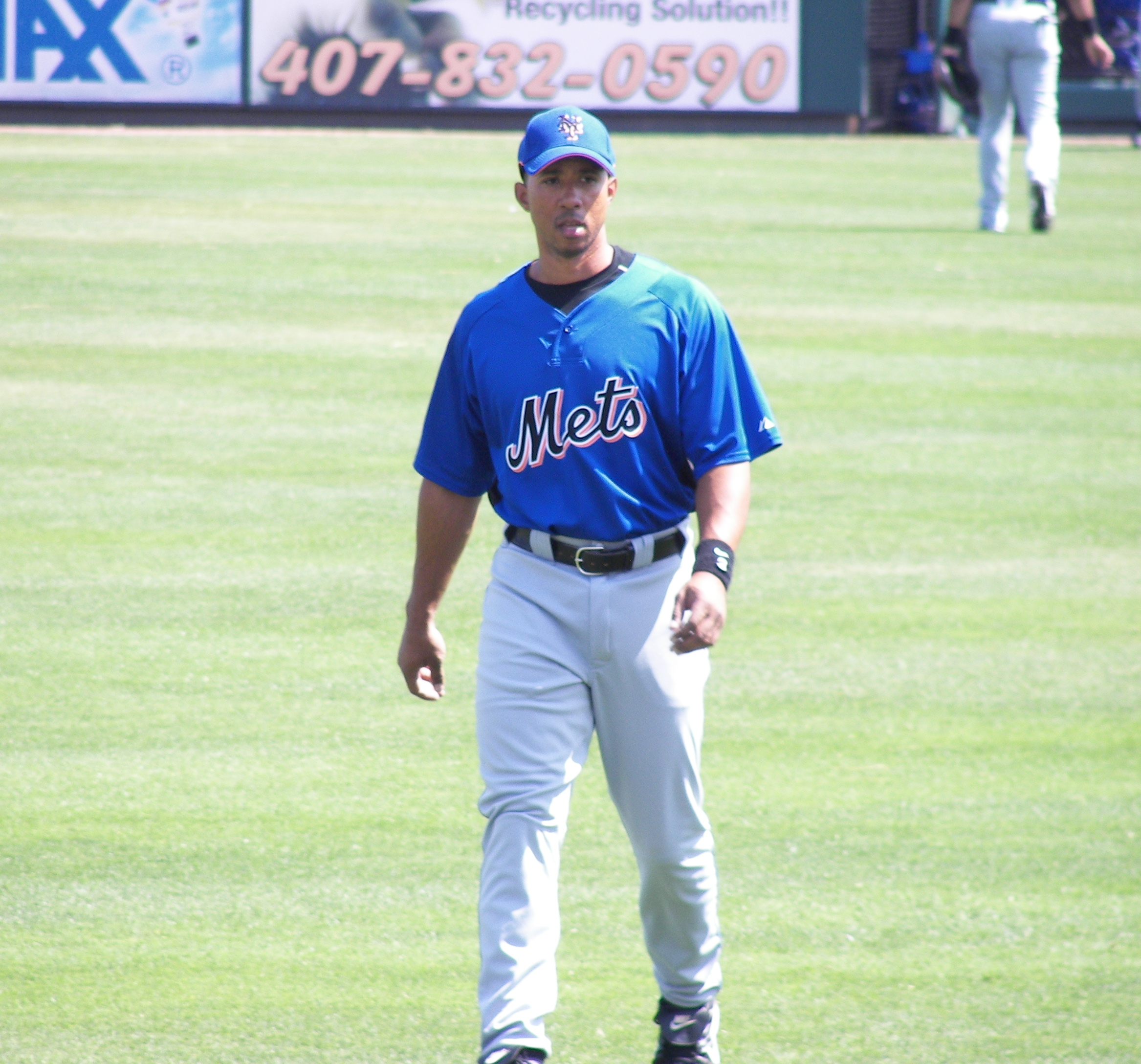
- Easley with the New York Mets

Arizona Diamondbacks – No. 75
- Second baseman / Coach
- Born: November 11, 1969 (age 56); New York City, New York, U.S.
- Batted: Right Threw: Right

MLB debut
- August 13, 1992, for the California Angels

Last MLB appearance
- September 28, 2008, for the New York Mets

MLB statistics
- Batting average: .253
- Home runs: 163
- Runs batted in: 684
- Stats at Baseball Reference

Teams
- As player: California Angels (1992–1996); Detroit Tigers (1996–2002); Tampa Bay Devil Rays (2003); Florida Marlins (2004–2005); Arizona Diamondbacks (2006); New York Mets (2007–2008); As coach: San Diego Padres (2019–2021); Arizona Diamondbacks (2022–present)

Career highlights and awards
- All-Star (1998); Silver Slugger Award (1998)

Jacinto Damion Easley (born November 11, 1969) is an American former professional baseball player who is currently an assistant hitting coach for the Arizona Diamondbacks of Major League Baseball (MLB). While primarily a second baseman throughout his career, he made appearances at every position except pitcher and catcher. He played in MLB for the California Angels, Detroit Tigers, Tampa Bay Devil Rays, Florida Marlins, Arizona Diamondbacks, and New York Mets.

== Early life ==
Easley was born November 11, 1969, in New York City. His father was half-Puerto Rican, half-Jamaican; his mother was Cuban with Cherokee descent. At age five, his family moved from the Bronx to Mount Vernon, New York. At age 11, his parents divorced and he moved with his father to California. He attended Lakewood High School in Lakewood, California, where he was criticized for dressing up in black face during a drama club performance of “My Fair Lady”. He attended Long Beach City College before being drafted by the California Angels in the 30th round of the 1988 amateur draft.

== Baseball career ==
Easley has played for the California Angels, Detroit Tigers, Tampa Bay Devil Rays, Florida Marlins, Arizona Diamondbacks, and the New York Mets.

On September 6, 1995, Easley was the final out of the 5th inning, making Cal Ripken Jr.'s 2,131st consecutive game official.

Easley served as a utility infielder with the Angels, making appearances at third base, shortstop, and second base. He also developed a reputation as being oft-injured, with several trips to the disabled list. On July 31, 1996, Detroit Tigers general manager Randy Smith traded pitcher and former first round pick Greg Gohr to the Angels for Easley.

The trade was a disaster for the Angels, as Gohr pitched poorly the rest of the season and was out of the majors thereafter, while with the Tigers, Easley's career took off. In 1997 he became the fourth Tiger in history with 20 home runs and 20 stolen bases in a single season while also leading the team with 37 doubles. At year's end Easley's yield was rewarded with a three-year, $8.7 million contract. By 1998, he was an American League All-Star. That year, he batted .271 and set career-highs with 27 home runs and 100 RBI. He also participated in the 1998 Home Run Derby, was named the May 24 AL Player of the Week, and won the Silver Slugger Award for second baseman. Easley also played excellent defense in 1998, leading AL second baseman in fielding percentage, range factor, assists, and putouts. He did not however win the Gold Glove, with the award going to perennial winner Roberto Alomar. With a combination of power, speed, and defense, Easley was considered to be amongst the best second baseman in baseball.

In 2001, Easley became the ninth Detroit Tiger to hit for the cycle. In 2001, Easley also had a five-hit game and an inside-the-park home run. On August 8, 2001, he tied a Tigers franchise record with 6 hits in a single game against the Texas Rangers. Easley finished the game 6 for 6, tying for the club record with Ty Cobb and Kid Nance.

In 2000, Easley signed a $28.9-million, five-year contract extension with the Tigers, making him amongst the highest paid second baseman in baseball. During spring training before the 2003 season, new Tigers manager Alan Trammell named Ramon Santiago as the team's starting second baseman. Viewed as expendable by the Tigers, Easley became the most expensive player cut loose in baseball history when he was released with $14.3 million still owed on his contract.

Shortly after his release from the Tigers, Easley signed as a bargain free agent with the Tampa Bay Devil Rays.

On November 16, 2006, Easley signed with the Mets as a free agent. His first year was a success, serving as a valuable utility player and pinch hitter. On August 2, 2007, Easley became the 24th player in Mets' history to hit an inside-the-park home run (against the Milwaukee Brewers), during a 12–4 victory. On August 18, 2007, Easley suffered a high ankle sprain while advancing to second base on a wild pitch. This injury ended his 2007 baseball season, but he resumed play with the Mets in 2008.

At the time of his retirement following the 2008 season, Easley had played the most regular season games (1706) of any player during the divisional playoff era (1994–present) that had never played in the postseason. Randy Winn broke this record in 2010; Adam Dunn is the current record holder. (Ernie Banks, who played most of his career before the League Championship Series was introduced, holds the all-time record.)

== Personal life ==
Easley is married with four children. His son Jayce was selected in the 5th Round of the 2018 Major League Baseball Draft as Pick #149 by the Texas Rangers.

== See also ==
- List of Major League Baseball players to hit for the cycle
- List of Major League Baseball single-game hits leaders

Achievements
Preceded by Luis Gonzalez	Hitting for the cycle June 8, 2001	Succeeded by John Olerud
