= Scott Lewis (right-handed pitcher) =

American baseball player (born 1965)

- Pitcher
- Born: December 5, 1965 (age 60); Grants Pass, Oregon, U.S.
- Batted: Right Threw: Right

MLB debut
- September 25, 1990, for the California Angels

Last MLB appearance
- July 22, 1994, for the California Angels

MLB statistics
- Win–loss record: 9–9
- Earned run average: 5.01
- Strikeouts: 84
- Stats at Baseball Reference

Teams
- California Angels (1990–1994)

Scott Allen Lewis (born December 5, 1965) is an American former professional baseball pitcher who played in Major League Baseball (MLB) for five seasons.

== Career ==
Lewis attended college at UNLV from 1985 to 1988. He was selected by the California Angels in the 11th round of the 1988 MLB draft and pitched for various of their farm teams. He pitched in MLB for the Angels from 1990 to 1994, appearing in 74 games with a 9–9 record with 5.01 ERA. Lewis was released by the Angels in July 1994. He then played for farm teams of the Houston Astros, Seattle Mariners, Boston Red Sox, and San Diego Padres through 1996.

Following his professional baseball career, Lewis became a general contractor.
