= Ron Tingley =

American baseball player (born 1959)

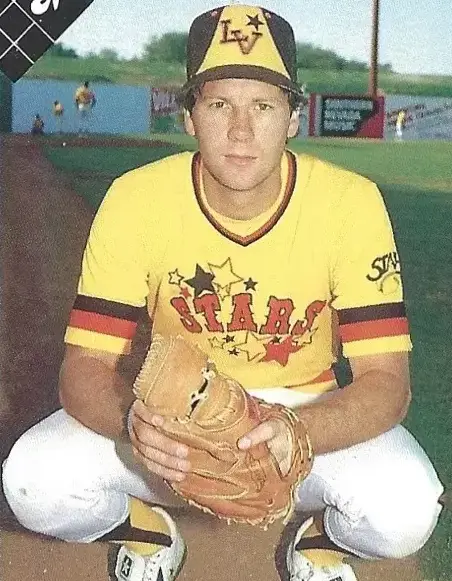
- Tingley with the Las Vegas Stars c. 1983
- Catcher
- Born: May 27, 1959 (age 66); Presque Isle, Maine, U.S.
- Batted: Right Threw: Right

MLB debut
- September 25, 1982, for the San Diego Padres

Last MLB appearance
- September 27, 1995, for the Detroit Tigers

MLB statistics
- Batting average: .195
- Home runs: 10
- Runs batted in: 55
- Stats at Baseball Reference

Teams
- San Diego Padres (1982); Cleveland Indians (1988); California Angels (1989–1993); Florida Marlins (1994); Chicago White Sox (1994); Detroit Tigers (1995)

Ronald Irvin Tingley (born May 27, 1959) is an American former professional baseball catcher in Major League Baseball (MLB). He was drafted by the San Diego Padres in the 10th round of the 1977 Major League Baseball draft.

== Career ==
=== 1979–1984 ===
He spent his first two professional seasons with the low-A Walla Walla Padres, in the Northwest League. In 64 games, he hit .197/.314/.260/.574, but he put up a .972 fielding percentage.

1979 would see Tingley split his season between the single-A Santa Clara Padres in the California League (52 games, .203/.288/.245/.533) and the double-A level Amarillo Gold Sox (30 games, .256/.356/.356/.711). He joined the Reno Silver Sox for the 1980 campaign, playing in 65 contests for the single-A level California League team, hitting .299/.393/.387/.781.

Tingley rejoined the Gold Sox for the 1981 season, playing in 116 games and spending the whole year at the double-A level, hitting .288/.376/.467/.843 with 13 home runs and 60 RBI. He finally reached the triple-A level in 1982, playing in 115 games for the Pacific Coast League Hawaii Islanders (.262/.363/.392/.755). He also made his first major league appearances, playing the final week of the season as San Diego's starting catcher. He batted eighth and collected two hits in 20 at bats. He wouldn't resurface at baseball's top level again for the next six seasons.

Tingley played the 1983 season with the Las Vegas Stars, which was the Padres’ new PCL affiliate. He hit .282/.365/.476/.841 in 92 games. Just prior to the 1984 season, San Diego traded him to the Seattle Mariners for Bill Wrona. He spent the season with the Salt Lake City Gulls, mostly on the injured reserve list. He went one-for-two over three appearances.

=== 1985–1991 ===
1985 would see Tingley spend a season with the Calgary Cannons, Seattle's new PCL affiliate team. He put up a .253/.330/.433/.763 statline with 11 home runs and 47 RBI in 83 contests. He signed on with the Atlanta Braves as a free agent following the season, and appeared in nine games for their Richmond affiliate through the first half of the season before getting released then picked up by the Cleveland Indians. He played 49 games with the Maine Guides in the International League. Between the two clubs, he hit .201/.251/.276/.527 with just 13 RBI.

Despite this poor showing, Tingley earned a return engagement with Cleveland in 1987, this time with their American Association affiliate, the Buffalo Bisons. He played in 57 games through the season and improved his batting line to .269/.376/.467/.843 with five round-trippers and 30 RBI. 1988 would see him join yet another triple-A club for the Indians, the Pacific Coast League Colorado Springs Sky Sox, where he hit .285/.347/.408/.755 in 44 games. That season would also mark his long-awaited return to baseball's top level. He appeared in nine games for Cleveland in August and September. On August 3, in his first game, he hit a two-run home run in his second inning plate appearance. He added a single in the fourth, but the Indians lost to the Baltimore Orioles, 8-3. He started behind the plate seven times and appeared twice as a pinch hitter, but only got two more hits (both singles) to close the season four-for-24.

In 1989, Tingley played the majority of the season back with the Sky Sox, appearing in 66 games and hitting .261/.318/.406/.723 with six home runs and 39 RBI. On September 6, the Tribe traded him to the California Angels for Mark McLemore. He didn't spend any time in the minors that season, appearing in four contests for the Angels and going one-for-three from the plate with a walk. 1990 would see him again spend most of the year in the PCL, this time with the Edmonton Trappers, hitting .267/.350/.430/.780 in 54 games. In yet another cup-of-coffee in the majors, he would go hitless in three at bats, drawing a walk over his five appearances.

1991 would mark the season that Tingley finally lost his “rookie” designation, at the age of 32. He played in only 17 games for the Trappers, going .291/.391/.545/.936 with three home runs and 15 RBI. He got called up to the Angels in May of that season, and appeared in a total of 45 games for the club. On May 25, in a 5-0 Angels win over the Toronto Blue Jays, he hit a one out RBI single in the second, later also scoring the second run of the game. He later drew a walk in the fourth and hit a two-out, bases-loaded two-RBI single in the eighth. On June 11, he walked in the second, hit a two-run double in the fourth, later scoring, and walked and scored in the sixth as the Angels defeated the Milwaukee Brewers, 4-3. He finished his season with a .200/.258/.287/.545 statline. Much more impressively, he led the American League by throwing out 52.4% of would-be base stealers.

"I've played all over in 15 years, from Canada to South America, and it has been an up-and-down journey," Tingley told The L.A. Times. "Hopefully I can turn things around and stay on an upswing for the next five years."

=== 1992–1994 ===
In 1992, Tingley stayed in the majors the whole season, appearing in a career-high 71 games and hitting .197/.282/.299/.581. He also ranked fourth in the AL with a 45.1% success rate in gunning down runners trying to steal. On June 16, he hit a three-run home run off Jose Guzman in the second inning of a 4–1 win over the Texas Rangers. On July 25, in a 9–0 win over the Detroit Tigers, he hit a two-out, two-run single in the second inning, also later scoring two runs.

1993 would see Tingley appear in 58 games with California, hitting .200/.277/.278/.555. On August 27, in the first game of a doubleheader against the Brewers, he hit a two-out, bases clearing double in the fourth inning of a 7–6 loss. The Angels granted him free agency after the season, and he signed with the Florida Marlins not long afterward for $270,000.

Tingley appeared in 19 games for the Marlins, starting 17 of them and appearing twice as a pinch hitter. Halfway through his stay, he became knuckleballer Charlie Hough’s preferred catcher, and played every fifth game. On May 18 he hit his only home run for the Marlins in the second inning of a 4–3 win over the New York Mets. On June 4 he hit a single, a double, and a triple in his three plate appearances against his original team the Padres. The Marlins won, 4-3. Florida granted his free agency on June 30, where he got signed by the Chicago White Sox.

=== 1995–1996 ===
Tingley went 0-for-5 with Chicago, spending the rest of his time with the triple-A Nashville Sounds in the American Association (six games, 2-for-16). The 1995 season would see him sign up with the Detroit Tigers, where he played in 54 games and got career highs in most of his hitting stats, with a line of .226/.307/.403/.710, four home runs and 18 RBI. In game two of a double header on September 3, he hit a pinch-hit grand slam in the bottom of the ninth to tie their game with the Indians at eight runs apiece. The Tigers battled back to win in the 10th by a 9-8 final count. He didn't again appear at the major league level.

1996 would mark Tingley's last season of competitive ball, with the Lake Elsinore Storm in the Angels A+ affiliate in the California League, hitting .308/.431/.462/.893 in 13 games.
