= Rick Turner (baseball) =

Richard Arthur Turner Jr. (born September 16, 1959, in Inglewood, California) is a former executive in the front office of the Los Angeles Angels of Anaheim of Major League Baseball, a former minor league catcher and Major League bullpen catcher and coach. He attended Santa Ana College, University of California, Riverside (where he played varsity baseball) and California State University, Fullerton.

During his 1981–1983 active career, Turner threw and batted right-handed; he stood 6 feet 2 inches (1.88 m) tall and weighed 190 pounds (86 kg).

His association with the California Angels began in June 1981, when he was selected by them in the ninth round of the 1981 Major League Baseball draft. Turner spent three seasons at the Rookie and Class A levels in the Angel farm system, appearing in 200 minor league games played, and batting .243 with two home runs and 61 runs batted in. He later became the Angels' bullpen catcher, and spent the 1992 and 1993 seasons as a full-time coach on the Angel staff under manager Buck Rodgers and interim skipper John Wathan. He was among the injured on May 21, 1992, when one of the Angels' team buses crashed on the New Jersey Turnpike while en route from New York to Baltimore. Turner sustained a wound to his torso that required 26 stitches to close. He was reassigned by the Angels after the 1993 season.

Turner left baseball in 1993 when his son, Richard Arthur Turner III, was born, and became a corporate sponsorship sales executive in 2000.

As of 2021, he is an independent sales contractor and married with three children.

| Preceded by Frank Reberger | California Angels bullpen coach 1992–1993 | Succeeded by Mick Billmeyer |
