= John Orton =

American baseball player (born 1965)

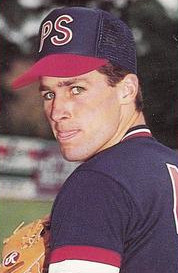
- Orton in 1988
- Catcher
- Born: December 8, 1965 (age 60); Santa Cruz, California, U.S.
- Batted: Right Threw: Right

MLB debut
- August 20, 1989, for the California Angels

Last MLB appearance
- July 4, 1993, for the California Angels

MLB statistics
- Batting average: .200
- Home runs: 4
- Runs batted in: 29
- Stats at Baseball Reference

Teams
- California Angels (1989–1993)

John Andrew Orton (born December 8, 1965) is an American professional baseball coach and a former Major League catcher. In 2015, Orton will serve his tenth season as roving minor league catching coordinator for the Chicago White Sox. He is an alumnus of California Polytechnic State University, San Luis Obispo, where he was an all conference catcher. As a player, he threw and batted right-handed, stood 6 feet 1 inch (1.85 m) tall and weighed 195 pounds (88 kg).

== Career ==
Drafted by the California Angels in the first round of the 1987 Major League Baseball draft, Orton had a decade-long professional career, including parts of five seasons (1989–1993) with the Angels. In 1992, he set personal bests in games played (43), plate appearances (125), hits (25), home runs (2), runs batted in (12) and batting average (.219). All told, he collected 80 hits in 156 MLB games played, with 18 doubles and four home runs.

He became a manager in the White Sox' system in 2001, working for five years at the Rookie and Class A levels, before becoming a roving instructor.
