= Gary DiSarcina =

American baseball player and coach (born 1967)

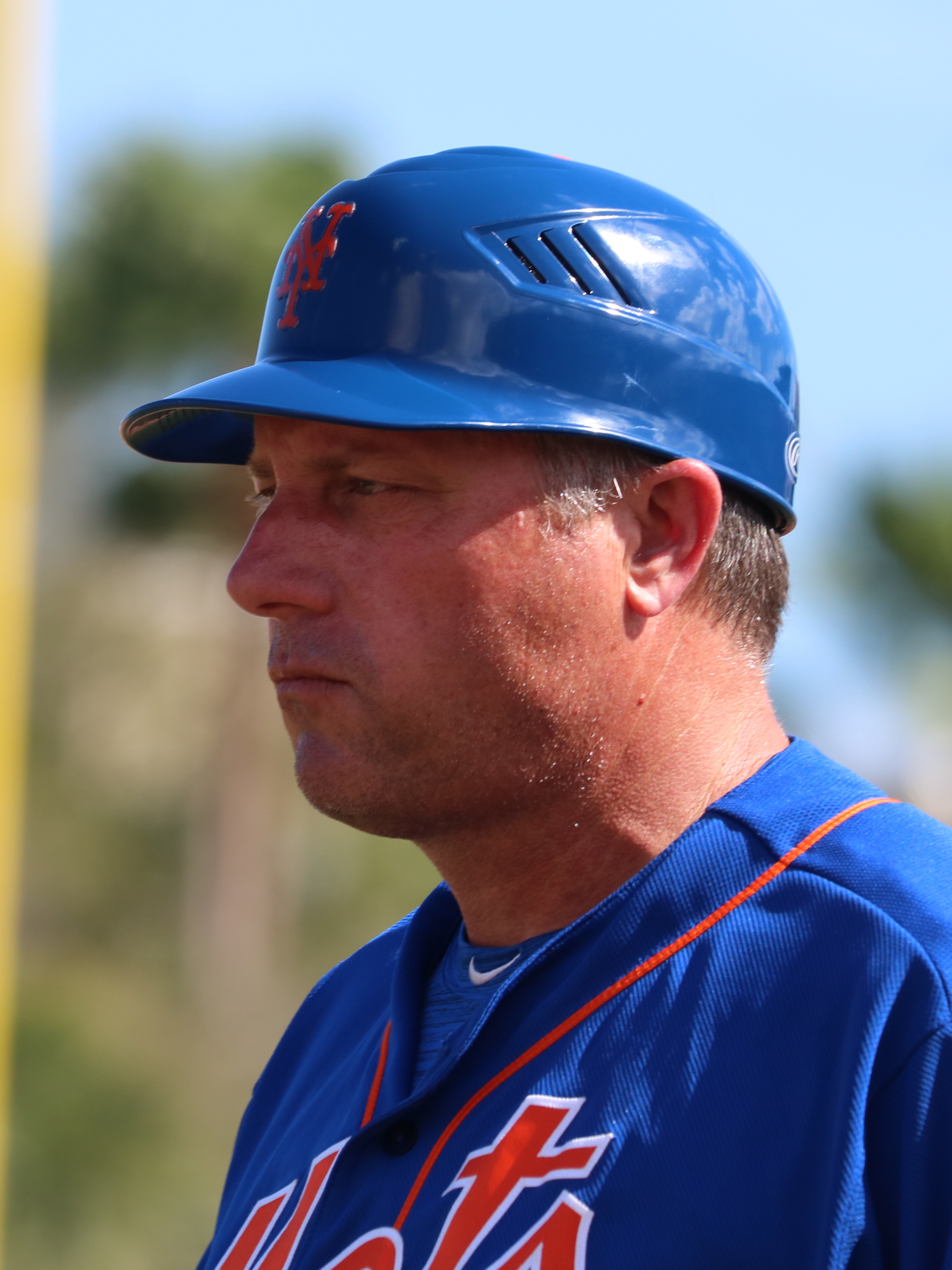
- DiSarcina with the Mets in 2019
- Shortstop
- Born: November 19, 1967 (age 58); Malden, Massachusetts, U.S.
- Batted: Right Threw: Right

MLB debut
- September 23, 1989, for the California Angels

Last MLB appearance
- May 8, 2000, for the Anaheim Angels

MLB statistics
- Batting average: .258
- Home runs: 28
- Runs batted in: 355
- Stats at Baseball Reference

Teams
- As player: California / Anaheim Angels (1989–2000); As coach: Los Angeles Angels of Anaheim / Los Angeles Angels (2014–2016); Boston Red Sox (2017); New York Mets (2018–2021); Washington Nationals (2022–2023)

Career highlights and awards
- All-Star (1995)

Gary Thomas DiSarcina (born November 19, 1967) is an American former professional baseball shortstop and coach. He played his entire Major League Baseball (MLB) career for the California / Anaheim Angels.

== Shortstop for Angels (1992–98) ==
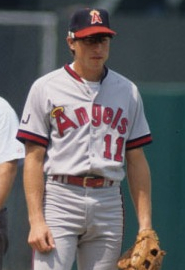
DiSarcina with the Angels in 1992

A former shortstop who stood 6 feet 1 inch (1.85 m) tall and weighed 170 pounds (77 kg), DiSarcina was raised in Billerica, Massachusetts, and attended the University of Massachusetts Amherst. In 1987, he played collegiate summer baseball with the Harwich Mariners of the Cape Cod Baseball League. He was drafted by the California Angels in the sixth round of the 1988 Major League Baseball draft.

After brief Major League trials from 1989 to 1991, DiSarcina replaced Dick Schofield as the Angels' regular shortstop in 1992 and held the job through 1998. He was selected to the American League All-Star team in 1995, a strike-shortened year when he batted a career-high .307 in 99 games played. He missed six weeks of action during that season, from August 4 through September 18, after sustaining a torn ligament in his thumb.

In 1998, his finest all-around season, he was voted the Angels' team MVP. That year, in 157 games played, DiSarcina reached career highs in hits (158) and runs batted in (56), while batting .287. But it was his last full season as a player; his career, hampered by injuries — including a broken arm that cost him half of the 1999 season — wound down during the next two years. He played only 12 games in 2000 and was out of baseball in 2001 before attempting a final comeback in 2002 in the Boston Red Sox organization with the Pawtucket Red Sox.

All told, DiSarcina played in 1,086 Major League games, all with the Angels; his 966 hits included 186 doubles, 20 triples and 28 home runs.

DiSarcina wore several numbers over the course of his career. He wore the number 4 during his first season. He changed to number 11, then to number 33 (in tribute to Larry Bird), and finally to number 9 for his remaining four seasons.

A DiSarcina fly ball was caught by Texas Ranger Rusty Greer for the final out of Kenny Rogers' perfect game on July 28, 1994.

== Minor league manager, MLB executive ==
After DiSarcina's playing career ended, he was associated with the Red Sox for several seasons, as baseball operations consultant to the team's front office, an in-studio analyst for the New England Sports Network, minor league manager and instructor. He skippered the Lowell Spinners of the Short Season-A New York–Penn League for three above-.500 seasons (2007–09) and served as the Red Sox' minor league infield instruction coordinator in 2010. DiSarcina was also the third base coach for Italy in the 2006 World Baseball Classic.

In 2011–12, he returned to the Angels as an assistant to general managers Tony Reagins and Jerry Dipoto, and also held the post of field coordinator of player instruction in the club's farm system.

He then came back to the Red Sox organization for one season — 2013 — as manager of the Pawtucket Red Sox, Boston's Triple-A minor league affiliate. During 2013, he led the PawSox to a first-place finish in the IL North Division with an 80–63 record and into the finals of the Governors' Cup championship, before his club fell to the Durham Bulls. For his efforts, he was selected 2013 Minor League Manager of the Year by Baseball America. DiSarcina's four-year managerial record through 2013 is 205–162 (.559).

== Coaching career ==
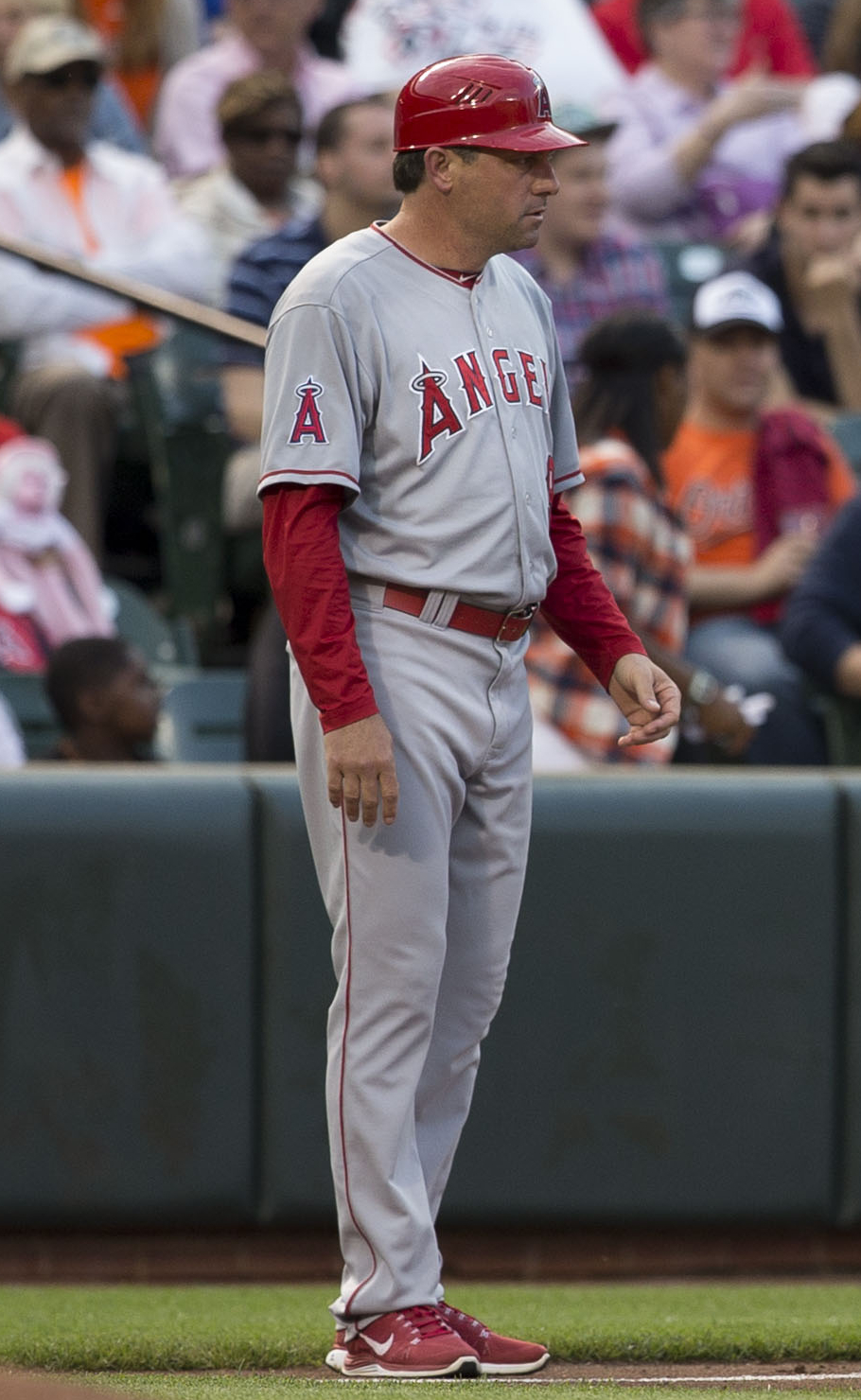
DiSarcina as third base coach for the Los Angeles Angels in 2015

DiSarcina's success at Pawtucket earned him a Major League managerial interview for the opening with the Seattle Mariners (who would hire Lloyd McClendon). On November 5, 2013, he joined the 2014 staff of Angels' manager Mike Scioscia, taking over the third-base coach's job from Dino Ebel, promoted to bench coach. After two seasons at third base, DiSarcina was shifted across the diamond to coach first base when Ron Roenicke rejoined Scioscia's staff for 2016 after a five-year absence.

On November 11, 2016, the Red Sox announced that DiSarcina would return to the Boston organization for a third time, as the 2017 bench coach on the MLB staff of manager John Farrell. In that role, he succeeded Torey Lovullo, who departed on November 4 to become manager of the Arizona Diamondbacks. DiSarcina served one season in that post, until Farrell's firing two days after Boston fell in the American League Division Series. On November 5, 2017, DiSarcina took over as the 2018 bench coach of the New York Mets on the staff of new manager Mickey Callaway. After one year as bench coach, he was reassigned to become the Mets' 2019 third-base coach.

On November 2, 2021, the Washington Nationals hired DiSarcina to be their 3rd base coach for the 2022 season.

== See also ==
- List of Major League Baseball players who spent their entire career with one franchise

Preceded by Bruce Crabbe	Lowell Spinners manager 2007–2009	Succeeded by Bruce Crabbe
Preceded by Arnie Beyeler	Pawtucket Red Sox manager 2013	Succeeded by Kevin Boles
Preceded by Dino Ebel	Los Angeles Angels third base coach 2014–2015	Succeeded by Ron Roenicke
Preceded by Alfredo Griffin	Los Angeles Angels first base coach 2016	Succeeded by Alfredo Griffin
Preceded by Torey Lovullo	Boston Red Sox bench coach 2017	Succeeded by Ron Roenicke
Preceded by Dick Scott	New York Mets bench coach 2018	Succeeded by Jim Riggleman
Preceded by Glenn Sherlock	New York Mets third base coach 2019–2021	Succeeded by Joey Cora
Preceded by Bob Henley	Washington Nationals third base coach 2022–2023	Succeeded by TBA
