= 1996 California Angels season =

Major League Baseball season

1996 California Angels
- League: American League
- Division: West
- Ballpark: Anaheim Stadium
- City: Anaheim, California
- Record: 70–91 (.435)
- Divisional place: 4th
- Owner: Gene Autry
- General manager: Bill Bavasi
- Managers: Marcel Lachemann, John McNamara, and Joe Maddon
- Television: KTLA; Prime Sports West (Ken Wilson, Ken Brett)
- Radio: KMPC (Bob Starr, Mario Impemba)
- Stats: ESPN.com; Baseball Reference

The 1996 California Angels season was the 36th season of the California Angels franchise in the American League, the 31st in Anaheim, and their 31st season playing their home games at Anaheim Stadium. The Angels finished fourth in the American League West with a record of 70 wins and 91 losses.

The season was notable for being the final season the franchise bore the "California Angels" moniker, as the team name was changed to "Anaheim Angels" the following season.

The Angels used 29 different pitchers during the season, the most of any MLB team in 1996.

== Offseason ==
- November 21, 1995: Randy Velarde was signed as a free agent with the California Angels.
- December 6, 1995: Mike Aldrete signed as a free agent with the California Angels.
- December 7, 1995: Scott Sanderson was signed as a free agent with the California Angels.
- December 18, 1995: Todd Frohwirth was signed as a free agent with the California Angels.
- January 9, 1996: Jim Abbott signed as a free agent with the California Angels.
- February 6, 1996: Mark Eichhorn was signed as a free agent with the California Angels.
- March 25, 1996: Ricky Jordan was purchased by the Seattle Mariners from the California Angels.

== Regular season ==
=== Season standings ===
AL West
Team	W	L	Pct.	GB	Home	Road
Texas Rangers	90	72	.556	—	50‍–‍31	40‍–‍41
Seattle Mariners	85	76	.528	4½	43‍–‍38	42‍–‍38
Oakland Athletics	78	84	.481	12	40‍–‍41	38‍–‍43
California Angels	70	91	.435	19½	43‍–‍38	27‍–‍53

=== Record vs. opponents ===
1996 American League record Source: MLB Standings Grid – 1996
Team	BAL	BOS	CAL	CWS	CLE	DET	KC	MIL	MIN	NYY	OAK	SEA	TEX	TOR
Baltimore	—	7–6	6–6	4–8	5–7	11–2	9–3	9–3	7–5	3–10	9–4	7–5	3–10–1	8–5
Boston	6–7	—	8–4	6–6	1–11	12–1	3–9	7–5	6–6	7–6	8–5	7–6	6–6	8–5
California	6–6	4–8	—	6–6	4–9	6–6	4–8	7–5	4–8	7–6	6–7	5–8	4–9	7–5
Chicago	8–4	6–6	6–6	—	5–8	10–3	7–6	6–7	6–7	6–7	5–7	5–7	8–4	7–5
Cleveland	7–5	11–1	9–4	8–5	—	12–0	7–6	7–6	10–3	3–9	6–6	8–4	4–8	7–5
Detroit	2–11	1–12	6–6	3–10	0–12	—	6–6	4–8	6–6	5–8	4–8	6–6	4–9	6–7
Kansas City	3–9	9–3	8–4	6–7	6–7	6–6	—	4–9	6–7	4–8	5–7	7–5	6–6	5–8
Milwaukee	3–9	5–7	5–7	7–6	6–7	8–4	9–4	—	9–4	6–6	7–5	4–9	6–7	5–7
Minnesota	5–7	6–6	8–4	7–6	3–10	6–6	7–6	4–9	—	5–7	6–7	6–6	7–5	8–5
New York	10–3	6–7	6–7	7–6	9–3	8–5	8–4	6–6	7–5	—	9–3	3–9	5–7	8–5
Oakland	4–9	5–8	7–6	7–5	6–6	8–4	7–5	5–7	7–6	3–9	—	8–5	7–6	4–8
Seattle	5–7	6–7	8–5	7–5	4–8	6–6	5–7	9–4	6–6	9–3	5–8	—	10–3	5–7
Texas	10–3–1	6–6	9–4	4–8	8–4	9–4	6–6	7–6	5–7	7–5	6–7	3–10	—	10–2
Toronto	5–8	5–8	5–7	5–7	5–7	7–6	8–5	7–5	5–8	5–8	8–4	7–5	2–10	—

=== Game log ===
1996 Game Log: 70–91 (Home: 43–38; Away: 27–53)
April: 13–12 (Home: 9–2; Away: 4–10)

#	Date	Opponent	Score	Win	Loss	Save	Attendance	Record
1	April 2	Brewers	9–15	Wickander	**Finley** (0–1)	—	27,836	0–1
2	April 3	Brewers	3–2 (11)	**James** (1–0)	Lloyd	—	15,024	1–1
3	April 5	White Sox	7–6 (11)	**James** (2–0)	McCaskill	—	22,812	2–1
4	April 6	White Sox	4–8	Fernandez	**Abbott** (0–1)	—	26,447	2–2
5	April 7	White Sox	6–5	**Finley** (1–1)	Alvarez	**Percival** (1)	16,970	3–2
6	April 9	@ Blue Jays	0–5	Hentgen	**Langston** (0–1)	—	36,616	3–3
7	April 10	@ Blue Jays	2–1	**Holzemer** (1–0)	Guzman	**Percival** (2)	25,446	4–3
8	April 11	@ Blue Jays	4–7	Hanson	**Abbott** (0–2)	Timlin	25,512	4–4
9	April 12	@ Tigers	5–4	**Finley** (2–1)	Lira	**Percival** (3)	9,921	5–4
10	April 13	@ Tigers	5–9	Keagle	**Sanderson** (0–1)	—	11,719	5–5
11	April 14	@ Tigers	4–5	Lewis	**James** (2–1)	—	12,009	5–6
12	April 15	@ Mariners	10–11	Charlton	**Eichhorn** (0–1)	—	36,960	5–7
13	April 16	@ Mariners	3–5	Johnson	**Abbott** (0–3)	—	25,404	5–8
14	April 17	Blue Jays	5–1	**Finley** (3–1)	Quantrill	—	15,361	6–8
15	April 18	Blue Jays	9–6	**James** (3–1)	Ware	**Percival** (4)	25,083	7–8
16	April 19	Tigers	4–3	**Langston** (1–1)	Myers	—	32,693	8–8
17	April 20	Tigers	2–1	**Grimsley** (1–0)	Keagle	**Percival** (5)	25,685	9–8
18	April 21	Tigers	6–5	**Eichhorn** (1–1)	Lewis	**Percival** (6)	36,733	10–8
19	April 22	Tigers	6–5	**James** (4–1)	Christopher	**Percival** (7)	17,039	11–8
20	April 24	@ Brewers	4–3	**Boskie** (1–0)	McDonald	**Percival** (8)	7,051	12–8
21	April 25	@ Brewers	5–6	Fetters	**James** (4–2)	—	6,707	12–9
	April 26	@ White Sox	Postponed (rain) Rescheduled for June 24					12–9
22	April 27	@ White Sox	1–2	Fernandez	**Abbott** (0–4)	Hernandez	18,139	12–10
23	April 28	@ White Sox	1–10	Baldwin	**Finley** (3–2)	—	15,574	12–11
24	April 29	@ White Sox	3–4	Alvarez	**Grimsley** (1–1)	Hernandez	12,549	12–12
25	April 30	@ Athletics	7–3	**Langston** (2–1)	Prieto	—	7,154	13–12

May: 13–14 (Home: 9–8; Away: 4–6)

#	Date	Opponent	Score	Win	Loss	Save	Attendance	Record
26	May 1	@ Athletics	6–4	**Boskie** (2–0)	Van Poppel	**Percival** (9)	6,721	14–12
27	May 2	@ Athletics	3–1	**Abbott** (1–4)	Johns	**Percival** (10)	9,102	15–12
28	May 3	Twins	4–1	**Finley** (4–2)	Robertson	**Percival** (11)	24,505	16–12
29	May 4	Twins	5–2	**Grimsley** (2–1)	Rodriguez	—	29,264	17–12
30	May 5	Twins	5–1	**Boskie** (3–0)	Hawkins	—	35,541	18–12
31	May 6	Royals	4–9	Belcher	**Leftwich** (0–1)	Pichardo	14,447	18–13
32	May 7	Royals	3–5	Valera	**Abbott** (1–5)	Montgomery	14,657	18–14
33	May 8	Royals	1–3 (14)	Pichardo	**Eichhorn** (1–2)	—	16,210	18–15
34	May 9	Royals	2–8	Gubicza	**Grimsley** (2–2)	—	15,302	18–16
35	May 10	Indians	13–8	**Boskie** (4–0)	Lopez	—	23,522	19–16
36	May 11	Indians	5–6	McDowell	**Sanderson** (0–2)	Mesa	32,102	19–17
37	May 12	Indians	1–4	Poole	**Percival** (0–1)	Mesa	22,768	19–18
38	May 14	@ Red Sox	3–4 (12)	Belinda	**Boskie** (4–1)	—	22,450	19–19
39	May 15	@ Red Sox	6–17	Moyer	**Grimsley** (2–3)	—	23,455	19–20
40	May 17	@ Yankees	5–8	Pettitte	**Abbott** (1–6)	Rivera	19,087	19–21
41	May 18	@ Yankees	3–7	Rogers	**Williams** (0–1)	Rivera	22,821	19–22
42	May 19	@ Yankees	10–1	**Finley** (5–2)	Kamieniecki	—	37,326	20–22
43	May 20	@ Orioles	1–13	Wells	**Grimsley** (2–4)	—	43,492	20–23
44	May 21	@ Orioles	5–2	**Boskie** (5–1)	Krivda	**Percival** (12)	39,974	21–23
45	May 22	@ Orioles	5–10	Haynes	**Abbott** (1–7)	McDowell	45,817	21–24
46	May 24	Red Sox	3–1	**Finley** (6–2)	Sele	**Percival** (13)	19,550	22–24
47	May 25	Red Sox	3–10	Gordon	**Williams** (0–2)	—	23,972	22–25
48	May 26	Red Sox	12–2	**Boskie** (6–1)	Eshelman	—	23,828	23–25
49	May 27	Yankees	5–16	Pettitte	**Abbott** (1–8)	—	20,926	23–26
50	May 28	Yankees	1–0	**Grimsley** (3–4)	Rogers	—	17,284	24–26
51	May 29	Yankees	4–0	**Finley** (7–2)	Mendoza	—	19,246	25–26
52	May 31	Orioles	10–3	**Langston** (3–1)	Wells	—	21,603	26–26

June: 15–14 (Home: 8–5; Away: 7–9)

#	Date	Opponent	Score	Win	Loss	Save	Attendance	Record
53	June 1	Orioles	8–3	**Boskie** (7–1)	Haynes	—	35,350	27–26
54	June 2	Orioles	1–14	Erickson	**Abbott** (1–9)	—	33,704	27–27
55	June 3	@ Twins	3–9	Trombley	**Finley** (7–3)	—	10,589	27–28
56	June 4	@ Twins	3–5	Rodriguez	**Grimsley** (3–5)	Guardado	10,899	27–29
57	June 5	@ Twins	3–14	Aldred	**Langston** (3–2)	Hansell	10,639	27–30
58	June 7	@ Indians	3–4	McDowell	**Boskie** (7–2)	Mesa	42,260	27–31
59	June 8	@ Indians	0–5	Hershiser	**Finley** (7–4)	—	42,267	27–32
60	June 9	@ Indians	8–6 (13)	**Hancock** (1–0)	Tavarez	—	42,237	28–32
61	June 10	@ Royals	7–5 (10)	**McElroy** (1–0)	Pugh	**Percival** (14)	15,691	29–32
62	June 11	@ Royals	11–9	**McElroy** (2–0)	Valera	**Percival** (15)	16,687	30–32
63	June 12	@ Royals	4–3 (10)	**McElroy** (3–0)	Montgomery	**Percival** (16)	15,428	31–32
64	June 13	Blue Jays	6–4	**Finley** (8–4)	Guzman	**James** (1)	20,528	32–32
65	June 14	Blue Jays	7–4	**Grimsley** (4–5)	Hanson	**Percival** (17)	18,503	33–32
66	June 15	Blue Jays	7–5	**Langston** (4–2)	Crabtree	**Percival** (18)	40,352	34–32
67	June 16	Blue Jays	4–6	Quantrill	**Abbott** (1–10)	Timlin	22,979	34–33
68	June 17	White Sox	9–8 (13)	**Hancock** (2–0)	McCaskill	—	17,836	35–33
69	June 18	White Sox	5–4	**Finley** (9–4)	Simas	**Percival** (19)	19,213	36–33
70	June 19	White Sox	14–2	**McElroy** (4–0)	Alvarez	—	22,960	37–33
71	June 20	@ Brewers	10–3	**Langston** (5–2)	Givens	—	16,034	38–33
72	June 21	@ Brewers	5–10	McDonald	**Abbott** (1–11)	—	16,274	38–34
73	June 22	@ Brewers	6–4	**Boskie** (8–2)	Miranda	**Percival** (20)	35,464	39–34
74	June 23	@ Brewers	4–8	Garcia	**Finley** (9–5)	—	17,051	39–35
75	June 24	@ White Sox	2–4	Alvarez	**James** (4–3)	Hernandez	—	39–36
76	June 24	@ White Sox	6–4	**Hancock** (3–0)	Sirotka	**Percival** (21)	24,469	40–36
77	June 25	@ White Sox	2–3	Tapani	**Langston** (5–3)	Hernandez	23,270	40–37
78	June 27	Athletics	2–18	Johns	**Boskie** (8–3)	—	23,503	40–38
79	June 28	Athletics	3–6	Chouinard	**Finley** (9–6)	—	32,380	40–39
80	June 29	Athletics	9–11	Groom	**Monteleone** (0–1)	—	26,565	40–40
81	June 30	Athletics	1–0	**Hancock** (4–0)	Wasdin	**Percival** (22)	19,284	41–40

July: 10–16 (Home: 7–6; Away: 3–10)

#	Date	Opponent	Score	Win	Loss	Save	Attendance	Record
82	July 1	Rangers	6–8	Gross	**Langston** (5–4)	Henneman	19,754	41–41
83	July 2	Rangers	6–5	**James** (5–3)	Henneman	—	19,055	42–41
84	July 3	Rangers	1–8	Pavlik	**Finley** (9–7)	—	45,979	42–42
85	July 4	@ Athletics	7–8 (11)	Taylor	**Monteleone** (0–2)	—	14,144	42–43
86	July 5	@ Athletics	8–16	Wasdin	**Hancock** (4–1)	—	36,129	42–44
87	July 6	@ Athletics	5–6 (10)	Taylor	**James** (5–4)	—	14,294	42–45
88	July 7	@ Athletics	9–4	**Boskie** (9–3)	Johns	—	16,526	43–45
89	July 11	@ Mariners	4–5 (12)	Carmona	**Monteleone** (0–3)	—	25,949	43–46
90	July 12	@ Mariners	6–7 (10)	Ayala	**McElroy** (4–1)	—	29,618	43–47
91	July 13	@ Mariners	6–4	**Boskie** (10–3)	Ayala	**Percival** (23)	37,792	44–47
92	July 14	@ Mariners	0–8	Wells	**Grimsley** (4–6)	—	33,243	44–48
93	July 15	@ Rangers	10–7	**Schmidt** (1–0)	Brandenburg	**Percival** (24)	45,655	45–48
94	July 16	@ Rangers	2–6	Oliver	**Abbott** (1–12)	Russell	34,680	45–49
95	July 17	@ Rangers	3–7	Hill	**Finley** (9–8)	—	44,220	45–50
96	July 18	Mariners	3–15	Meacham	**Boskie** (10–4)	—	22,780	45–51
97	July 19	Mariners	9–4	**Grimsley** (5–6)	Wells	—	23,332	46–51
98	July 20	Mariners	5–4	**Schmidt** (2–0)	Charlton	**Percival** (25)	31,759	47–51
99	July 21	Mariners	2–6	Hitchcock	**Abbott** (1–13)	—	22,088	47–52
100	July 22	Tigers	1–0	**Finley** (10–8)	Olivares	**Percival** (26)	16,336	48–52
101	July 23	Tigers	3–8	Lima	**James** (5–5)	—	16,432	48–53
102	July 25	Brewers	5–4	**Holtz** (1–0)	Lloyd	—	16,841	49–53
103	July 26	Brewers	6–5	**Springer** (1–0)	D'Amico	**Percival** (27)	18,189	50–53
104	July 27	Brewers	7–0	**Finley** (11–8)	McDonald	—	17,497	51–53
105	July 28	Brewers	3–4 (13)	Miranda	**Holtz** (1–1)	Garcia	25,539	51–54
106	July 30	@ Tigers	9–12	Nitkowski	**Grimsley** (5–7)	—	11,641	51–55
107	July 31	@ Tigers	5–10	Lima	**Holtz** (1–2)	—	9,740	51–56

August: 11–18 (Home: 4–11; Away: 7–7)

#	Date	Opponent	Score	Win	Loss	Save	Attendance	Record
108	August 1	@ Tigers	5–13	Williams	**Boskie** (10–5)	—	14,591	51–57
109	August 2	@ Blue Jays	2–9	Hentgen	**Finley** (11–9)	—	30,261	51–58
110	August 3	@ Blue Jays	11–6	**Langston** (6–4)	Castillo	—	32,139	52–58
111	August 4	@ Blue Jays	1–7	Flener	**Abbott** (1–14)	—	30,253	52–59
112	August 6	Twins	1–4	Radke	**Springer** (1–1)	Guardado	20,058	52–60
113	August 7	Twins	0–4	Robertson	**Finley** (11–10)	—	18,611	52–61
114	August 8	Twins	5–13	Aguilera	**Boskie** (10–6)	—	21,283	52–62
115	August 9	Royals	3–5	Rosado	**Langston** (6–5)	Montgomery	35,977	52–63
116	August 10	Royals	3–18	Haney	**Abbott** (1–15)	—	21,657	52–64
117	August 11	Royals	6–5	**Springer** (2–1)	Belcher	—	18,591	53–64
118	August 12	Indians	4–5	Hershiser	**Finley** (11–11)	Mesa	19,499	53–65
119	August 13	Indians	4–2	**Boskie** (11–6)	Ogea	**Percival** (28)	19,569	54–65
120	August 14	Indians	8–7	**Gohr** (1–0)	McDowell	**Percival** (29)	23,887	55–65
121	August 16	@ Red Sox	6–3	**Springer** (3–1)	Wakefield	**Percival** (30)	30,693	56–65
122	August 17	@ Red Sox	0–6	Clemens	**Finley** (11–12)	—	32,497	56–66
123	August 18	@ Red Sox	4–3	**Holtz** (2–2)	Brandenburg	**Percival** (31)	25,224	57–66
124	August 19	@ Red Sox	9–10	Lacy	**Gohr** (1–1)	Slocumb	25,779	57–67
125	August 20	@ Yankees	6–17	Boehringer	**Springer** (3–2)	—	20,795	57–68
126	August 21	@ Yankees	7–1	**Dickson** (1–0)	Key	**Percival** (32)	27,811	58–68
127	August 22	@ Yankees	12–3	**Finley** (12–12)	Rogers	—	27,191	59–68
128	August 23	@ Orioles	2–0	**Boskie** (12–6)	Wells	**Percival** (33)	47,291	60–68
129	August 24	@ Orioles	4–5	Mussina	**Abbott** (1–16)	Myers	46,487	60–69
130	August 25	@ Orioles	13–0	**Springer** (4–2)	Erickson	—	47,239	61–69
131	August 26	Red Sox	1–4	Wakefield	**Dickson** (1–1)	—	16,886	61–70
132	August 27	Red Sox	1–2	Clemens	**Finley** (12–13)	Slocumb	19,947	61–71
133	August 28	Red Sox	4–7	Gordon	**Boskie** (12–7)	—	20,894	61–72
134	August 29	Yankees	14–3	**Holtz** (3–2)	Whitehurst	—	19,755	62–72
135	August 30	Yankees	2–6	Pettitte	**Springer** (4–3)	—	27,084	62–73
136	August 31	Yankees	3–14	Key	**Dickson** (1–2)	—	28,749	62–74

September: 8–17 (Home: 6–6; Away: 2–11)

#	Date	Opponent	Score	Win	Loss	Save	Attendance	Record
137	September 1	Yankees	4–0	**Finley** (13–13)	Rogers	—	19,384	63–74
138	September 2	Orioles	8–12	Mussina	**Boskie** (12–8)	—	20,287	63–75
139	September 3	Orioles	10–2	**Harris** (1–0)	Coppinger	—	15,924	64–75
140	September 4	Orioles	2–4	Erickson	**Springer** (4–4)	Myers	18,204	64–76
141	September 6	@ Twins	2–6	Radke	**Finley** (13–14)	—	13,006	64–77
142	September 7	@ Twins	3–6	Stevens	**Boskie** (12–9)	Trombley	51,011	64–78
143	September 8	@ Twins	4–2	**Abbott** (2–16)	Rodriguez	**Percival** (34)	14,378	65–78
144	September 9	@ Indians	3–4	Shuey	**Holtz** (3–3)	Mesa	42,208	65–79
145	September 10	@ Indians	5–7	Assenmacher	**Percival** (0–2)	—	42,181	65–80
146	September 11	@ Indians	0–2	McDowell	**Finley** (13–15)	Mesa	42,264	65–81
147	September 12	@ Indians	2–11	Anderson	**Boskie** (12–10)	—	42,244	65–82
148	September 13	@ Royals	2–8	Belcher	**Abbott** (2–17)	—	13,083	65–83
149	September 14	@ Royals	5–8	Appier	**Dickson** (1–3)	—	17,174	65–84
	September 15	@ Royals	Cancelled (rain)					65–84
150	September 17	Athletics	1–5	Prieto	**Springer** (4–5)	—	17,827	65–85
151	September 18	Athletics	3–1	**Finley** (14–15)	Adams	**Percival** (35)	18,213	66–85
152	September 20	Rangers	6–5 (10)	**McElroy** (5–1)	Stanton	—	18,860	67–85
153	September 21	Rangers	1–7	Burkett	**Abbott** (2–18)	—	24,104	67–86
154	September 22	Rangers	1–4	Hill	**Dickson** (1–4)	—	17,522	67–87
155	September 23	Mariners	4–3	**Finley** (15–15)	Hitchcock	**Percival** (36)	16,212	68–87
156	September 24	Mariners	11–6	**Springer** (5–5)	Wells	—	18,891	69–87
157	September 25	Mariners	2–11	Torres	**Boskie** (12–11)	—	17,160	69–88
158	September 26	@ Rangers	5–6	Burkett	**Abbott** (2–19)	Henneman	33,895	69–89
159	September 27	@ Rangers	4–3 (15)	**Harris** (2–0)	Whiteside	**Gohr** (1)	46,764	70–89
160	September 28	@ Rangers	3–4	Oliver	**Finley** (15–16)	Heredia	45,651	70–90
161	September 29	@ Rangers	3–4	Witt	**Springer** (5–6)	—	45,434	70–91

Legend: = Win = Loss
Bold = Angels team member

=== Detailed records ===
American League
Opponent	W	L	WP	RS	RA
AL East
Baltimore Orioles	6	6	0.500	69	68
Boston Red Sox	4	8	0.333	52	69
Detroit Tigers	6	6	0.500	55	75
New York Yankees	7	6	0.538	76	76
Toronto Blue Jays	7	5	0.583	58	61
Total	30	31	0.492	310	349
AL Central
Chicago White Sox	6	6	0.500	60	60
Cleveland Indians	4	9	0.308	56	71
Kansas City Royals	4	8	0.333	51	86
Milwaukee Brewers	7	5	0.583	67	64
Minnesota Twins	4	8	0.333	38	67
Total	25	36	0.410	272	348
AL West
**California Angels**					
Oakland Athletics	6	7	0.462	64	83
Seattle Mariners	5	8	0.385	65	89
Texas Rangers	4	9	0.308	51	74
Total	15	24	0.385	180	246
Season Total	70	91	0.435	762	943

Month	Games	Won	Lost	Win %	RS	RA
April	25	13	12	0.520	115	132
May	27	13	14	0.481	128	146
June	29	15	14	0.517	153	181
July	26	10	16	0.385	131	171
August	29	11	18	0.379	141	182
September	25	8	17	0.320	94	131
Total	161	70	91	0.435	762	943

	Games	Won	Lost	Win %	RS	RA
Home	81	43	38	0.531	387	451
Away	80	27	53	0.338	375	492
Total	161	70	91	0.435	762	943

=== Notable transactions ===
- May 16, 1996: Scott Sanderson was released by the California Angels.
- May 27, 1996: Lee Smith was traded by the California Angels to the Cincinnati Reds for Chuck McElroy.
- June 30, 1996: Vince Coleman signed as a free agent with the California Angels.
- September 6, 1996: Robert Eenhoorn was selected off waivers by the California Angels from the New York Yankees.

=== Roster ===
1996 California Angels
**Roster**
**Pitchers**: 52 Jim Abbott; 55 Kyle Abbott; 22 Shawn Boskie; 19 Jason Dickson; 48 Ken Edenfield; 58 Mark Eichhorn; 55 Robert Ellis; 31 Chuck Finley; 28 Todd Frohwirth; 36 Greg Gohr; 56 Jason Grimsley; 60 Ryan Hancock; 48 Pep Harris; 65 Mike Holtz; 42 Mark Holzemer; 46 Mike James; 12 Mark Langston; 45 Phil Leftwich; 21 Darrell May; 17 Chuck McElroy; 43 Rich Monteleone; 21 Brad Pennington; 40 Troy Percival; 21 Scott Sanderson; 37 Jeff Schmidt; 47 Lee Smith; 35 Russ Springer; 17 Ben Van Ryn; 59 Shad Williams	**Catchers**: 7 Pat Borders; 14 Jorge Fábregas; 8 Todd Greene; 11 Don Slaught; 20 Chris Turner; **Infielders**: 5 George Arias; 33 Gary DiSarcina; 1 Damion Easley; 11 Robert Eenhoorn; 32 Jack Howell; 10 Rex Hudler; 28 Chris Pritchett; 9 Dick Schofield; 6 J. T. Snow; 18 Randy Velarde; 23 Tim Wallach	**Outfielders**: 27 Mike Aldrete; 16 Garret Anderson; 25 Jim Edmonds; 27 Darin Erstad; 3 Orlando Palmeiro; 15 Tim Salmon; **Other batters**: 44 Chili Davis	**Manager**: 53 Marcel Lachemann; 70 Joe Maddon; 1 John McNamara; **Coaches**: 57 Mick Billmeyer (Bullpen); 39 Rick Burleson (Third Base); 29 Rod Carew (Hitting); -- Joe Coleman (Pitching); -- Mike Couchee (Bullpen); 55 Chuck Hernandez (Pitching); 2 Bobby Knoop (Bench); 38 Bill Lachemann (Assistant); 70 Joe Maddon (First Base); -- Eddie Rodríguez (Third Base)

== Player stats ==
=== Batting ===
==== Starters by position ====
Note: Pos = Position; G = Games played; AB = At bats; H = Hits; Avg. = Batting average; HR = Home runs; RBI = Runs batted in

Pos	Player	G	AB	H	Avg.	HR	RBI
C	Jorge Fábregas	90	254	73	.287	2	26
1B	J.T. Snow	155	575	148	.257	17	67
2B	Randy Velarde	136	530	151	.285	14	54
SS	Gary Disarcina	150	536	137	.256	5	48
3B	George Arias	84	252	60	.238	6	28
LF	Garret Anderson	150	607	173	.285	12	72
CF	Jim Edmonds	114	431	131	.304	27	66
RF	Tim Salmon	156	581	166	.286	30	98
DH	Chili Davis	145	530	155	.292	28	95

==== Other batters ====
Note: G = Games played; AB = At bats; H = Hits; Avg. = Batting average; HR = Home runs; RBI = Runs batted in

Player	G	AB	H	Avg.	HR	RBI
Rex Hudler	92	302	94	.311	16	40
Darin Erstad	57	208	59	.284	4	20
Don Slaught	62	207	67	.324	6	32
Tim Wallach	57	190	45	.237	8	20
Jack Howell	66	126	34	.270	8	21
Orlando Palmeiro	50	87	25	.287	0	6
Todd Greene	29	79	15	.190	2	9
Pat Borders	19	57	13	.228	2	8
Damion Easley	28	45	7	.156	2	7
Mike Aldrete	31	40	6	.150	3	8
Dick Schofield	13	16	4	.250	0	0
Robert Eenhoorn	6	15	4	.267	0	0
Chris Pritchett	5	13	2	.154	0	1
Chris Turner	4	3	1	.333	0	1

=== Pitching ===
==== Starting pitchers ====
Note: G = Games pitched; IP = Innings pitched; W = Wins; L = Losses; ERA = Earned run average; SO = Strikeouts

Player	G	IP	W	L	ERA	SO
Chuck Finley	35	238.0	15	16	4.16	215
Shawn Boskie	37	189.1	12	11	5.32	133
Jim Abbott	27	142.0	2	18	7.48	58
Mark Langston	18	123.1	6	5	4.82	83
Dennis Springer	20	94.2	5	6	5.51	64
Jason Dickson	7	43.1	1	4	4.57	20
Scott Sanderson	5	18.0	0	2	7.50	7
Phil Leftwich	2	7.1	0	1	7.36	4

==== Other pitchers ====
Note: G = Games pitched; IP = Innings pitched; W = Wins; L = Losses; ERA = Earned run average; SO = Strikeouts

Player	G	IP	W	L	ERA	SO
Jason Grimsley	35	130.1	5	7	6.84	82
Pep Harris	11	32.1	2	0	3.90	20
Shad Williams	13	28.1	0	2	8.89	26
Ryan Hancock	11	27.2	4	1	7.48	19

==== Relief pitchers ====
Note: G = Games pitched; W = Wins; L = Losses; SV = Saves; ERA = Earned run average; SO = Strikeouts

Player	G	W	L	SV	ERA	SO
Troy Percival	62	0	2	36	2.31	100
Mike James	69	5	5	1	2.67	65
Chuck McElroy	40	5	1	0	2.95	32
Mike Holtz	30	3	3	0	2.45	31
Mark Holzemer	25	1	0	0	8.76	20
Mark Eichhorn	24	1	2	0	5.04	24
Greg Gohr	15	1	1	1	7.50	15
Rich Monteleone	12	0	3	0	5.87	5
Lee Smith	11	0	0	0	2.45	6
Jeff Schmidt	9	2	0	0	7.88	2
Brad Pennington	8	0	0	0	12.27	7
Darrell May	5	0	0	0	10.13	1
Todd Frohwirth	4	0	0	0	11.12	1
Robert Ellis	3	0	0	0	0.00	5
Kyle Abbott	3	0	1	0	20.25	3
Ken Edenfield	2	0	0	0	10.38	4
Ben Van Ryn	1	0	0	0	0.00	0

== Farm system ==
Level	Team	League	Manager
AAA	Vancouver Canadians	Pacific Coast League	Don Long
AA	Midland Angels	Texas League	Mario Mendoza
A	Lake Elsinore Storm	California League	Mitch Seoane
A	Cedar Rapids Kernels	Midwest League	Tom Lawless
A-Short Season	Boise Hawks	Northwest League	Tom Kotchman
Rookie	AZL Angels	Arizona League	Bruce Hines

LEAGUE CHAMPIONS: Lake Elsinore

Records
Preceded by 1995	California Angels seasons 1996	Succeeded by 1997
