= 1995 California Angels season =

Major League Baseball season

1995 California Angels
- League: American League
- Division: West
- Ballpark: Anaheim Stadium
- City: Anaheim, California
- Record: 78–67 (.538)
- Divisional place: 2nd
- Owner: Gene Autry
- General manager: Bill Bavasi
- Manager: Marcel Lachemann
- Television: KTLA; Prime Sports West (Ken Wilson, Ken Brett)
- Radio: KMPC (Bob Starr, Mario Impemba)
- Stats: ESPN.com; Baseball Reference

The 1995 California Angels season was the 35th season of the California Angels franchise in the American League, the 30th in Anaheim, and their 30th season playing their home games at Anaheim Stadium. The Angels finished in second place in the American League West with a record of 78 wins and 67 losses.

The 1995 Angels went through statistically the worst late-season collapse in Major League Baseball history. On August 16, they held a 10½-game lead over the Texas Rangers and an 11½-game lead over the Seattle Mariners, but suffered through a late season slump, including a nine-game losing streak from August 25 to September 3. They were still atop the division, leading Seattle by 6 games and Texas by 7½, when a second nine-game losing streak from September 13 to 23 dropped them out of first place. The Angels rebounded to win the last five scheduled games to tie Seattle for the division lead, forcing a one-game playoff to determine the division champion. Mariners ace Randy Johnson led his team to a 9–1 triumph over Angel hurler Mark Langston in the tiebreaker game, ending the Angels' season. It was the closest the Angels would come to reaching the postseason between 1986 and 2002.

== Offseason ==
- December 6, 1994: Rex Hudler was signed as a free agent with the California Angels.
- December 14, 1994: Lee Smith was signed as a free agent with the California Angels.

== Regular season ==
=== Season standings ===
AL West
Team	W	L	Pct.	GB	Home	Road
Seattle Mariners	79	66	.545	—	46‍–‍27	33‍–‍39
California Angels	78	67	.538	1	39‍–‍33	39‍–‍34
Texas Rangers	74	70	.514	4½	41‍–‍31	33‍–‍39
Oakland Athletics	67	77	.465	11½	38‍–‍34	29‍–‍43

=== Record vs. opponents ===
1995 American League record Source: MLB Standings Grid – 1995
Team	BAL	BOS	CAL	CWS	CLE	DET	KC	MIL	MIN	NYY	OAK	SEA	TEX	TOR
Baltimore	—	4–9	9–4	6–1	2–10	8–5	4–5	7–5	3–6	6–7	5–7	6–7	4–1	7–6
Boston	9–4	—	11–3	5–3	6–7	8–5	3–2	8–4	5–4	5–8	8–4	7–5	3–4	8–5
California	4–9	3–11	—	10–2	3–2	6–2	5–7	5–2	8–5	7–5	6–7	7–6	6–7	8–2
Chicago	1–6	3–5	2–10	—	5–8	8–4	8–5	6–7	10–3	3–2–1	7–5	4–9	5–7	6–5
Cleveland	10–2	7–6	2–3	8–5	—	10–3	11–1	9–4	9–4	6–6	7–0	5–4	6–3	10–3
Detroit	5–8	5–8	2–6	4–8	3–10	—	3–4	8–5	7–5	5–8	2–3	5–5	4–8	7–6
Kansas City	5–4	2–3	7–5	5–8	1–11	4–3	—	10–2	6–7	3–7	5–8	7–5	8–6	7–5
Milwaukee	5–7	4–8	2–5	7–6	4–9	5–8	2–10	—	9–4	5–6	7–2	3–2	5–7	7–5
Minnesota	6–3	4–5	5–8	3–10	4–9	5–7	7–6	4–9	—	3–4	5–7	4–8	5–8	1–4
New York	7–6	8–5	5–7	2–3–1	6–6	8–5	7–3	6–5	4–3	—	4–9	4–9	6–3	12–1
Oakland	7–5	4–8	7–6	5–7	0–7	3–2	8–5	2–7	7–5	9–4	—	7–6	5–8	3–7
Seattle	7–6	5–7	6–7	9–4	4–5	5–5	5–7	2–3	8–4	9–4	6–7	—	10–3	3–4
Texas	1–4	4–3	7–6	7–5	3–6	8–4	6–8	7–5	8–5	3–6	8–5	3–10	—	9–3
Toronto	6–7	5–8	2–8	5–6	3–10	6–7	5–7	5–7	4–1	1–12	7–3	4–3	3–9	—

=== Notable transactions ===
- April 13, 1995: Tony Phillips was traded by the Detroit Tigers to the California Angels for Chad Curtis.
- April 18, 1995: Scott Sanderson was signed as a free agent with the California Angels.
- April 18, 1995: Mike Bielecki was signed as a free agent with the California Angels.
- April 26, 1995: Ricky Jordan was signed as a free agent with the California Angels.
- June 1, 1995: Darin Erstad was drafted by the California Angels in the 1st round (1st pick) of the 1995 amateur draft. Player signed July 26, 1995.
- July 9, 1995: Mark Sweeney was traded by the California Angels to the St. Louis Cardinals for John Habyan.
- July 27, 1995: Jim Abbott was traded by the Chicago White Sox with Tim Fortugno to the California Angels for McKay Christensen, John Snyder, Andrew Lorraine, and Bill Simas.
- August 24, 1995: Mike Aldrete was traded by the Oakland Athletics to the California Angels for Demond Smith (minors).

=== Roster ===
1995 California Angels
Roster
Pitchers: 52 Jim Abbott; 56 Brian Anderson; 54 Erik Bennett; 36 Mike Bielecki; 22 Shawn Boskie; 23 Mike Butcher; 48 Ken Edenfield; 31 Chuck Finley; 32 John Habyan; 34 Mike Harkey; 42 Mark Holzemer; 46 Mike James; 12 Mark Langston; 43 Rich Monteleone; 37 Bob Patterson; 40 Troy Percival; 21 Scott Sanderson; 47 Lee Smith; 43 Russ Springer; 99 Mitch Williams	Catchers: 28 Andy Allanson; 7 Mark Dalesandro; 14 Jorge Fábregas; 11 Greg Myers; 20 Chris Turner; Infielders: 5 Rod Correia; 33 Gary DiSarcina; 1 Damion Easley; 88 Rene Gonzales; 10 Rex Hudler; 13 José Lind; 9 Carlos Martínez; 17 Spike Owen; 24 Eduardo Pérez; 19 Tony Phillips; 9 Dick Schofield; 6 J. T. Snow	Outfielders: 27 Mike Aldrete; 16 Garret Anderson; 25 Jim Edmonds; 18 Dave Gallagher; 3 Orlando Palmeiro; 15 Tim Salmon; Other batters: 44 Chili Davis; 8 Kevin Flora	Manager: 53 Marcel Lachemann; Coaches: 57 Mick Billmeyer (Bullpen); 39 Rick Burleson (Third Base); 29 Rod Carew (Hitting); 55 Chuck Hernandez (Pitching); 2 Bobby Knoop (Bench); 38 Bill Lachemann (Assistant); 70 Joe Maddon (First Base)

== Player stats ==
= Indicates team leader

=== Batting ===
Note: Pos = Position; G = Games played; AB = At bats; H = Hits; Avg. = Batting average; HR = Home runs; RBI = Runs batted in

Pos	Player	G	AB	H	Avg.	HR	RBI
C	Jorge Fábregas	73	227	56	.247	1	22
1B	J. T. Snow	143	544	157	.289	24	102
2B	Damion Easley	114	357	77	.216	4	35
3B	Tony Phillips	139	525	137	.261	27	61
SS	Gary DiSarcina	99	362	111	.307	5	41
LF	Garret Anderson	106	374	120	.321	16	69
CF	Jim Edmonds	141	558	162	.290	33	107
RF	Tim Salmon	143	537	177	.330	34	105
DH	Chili Davis	119	424	135	.318	20	86

==== Other batters ====
Note: G = Games played; AB = At bats; H = Hits; Avg. = Batting average; HR = Home runs; RBI = Runs batted in

Player	G	AB	H	Avg.	HR	RBI
Greg Myers	85	273	71	.260	9	38
Rex Hudler	84	223	59	.265	6	27
Spike Owen	82	218	50	.229	1	28
Andy Allanson	35	82	14	.171	3	10
Eduardo Pérez	29	71	12	.169	1	7
Carlos Martínez	26	61	11	.180	1	9
José Lind	15	43	7	.163	0	1
Mike Aldrete	18	24	6	.250	0	3
Rod Correia	14	21	5	.238	0	3
Orlando Palmeiro	15	20	7	.350	0	1
Dick Schofield	12	20	5	.250	0	2
Rene Gonzales	30	18	6	.333	1	3
Dave Gallagher	11	16	3	.188	0	0
Mark Dalesandro	11	10	1	.100	0	0
Chris Turner	5	10	1	.100	0	1
Kevin Flora	2	1	0	.000	0	0

=== Pitching ===
==== Starting pitchers ====
Note: G = Games pitched; IP = Innings pitched; W = Wins; L = Losses; ERA = Earned run average; SO = Strikeouts

Player	G	IP	W	L	ERA	SO
Chuck Finley	32	203.0	15	12	4.21	195
Mark Langston	31	200.1	15	7	4.63	142
Shawn Boskie	20	111.2	7	7	5.64	51
Brian Anderson	18	99.2	6	8	5.87	45
Jim Abbott	13	84.2	5	4	4.15	41
Scott Sanderson	7	39.1	1	3	4.12	23

==== Other pitchers ====
Note: G = Games pitched; IP = Innings pitched; W = Wins; L = Losses; ERA = Earned run average; SO = Strikeouts

Player	G	IP	W	L	ERA	SO
Mike Bielecki	22	75.1	4	6	5.97	45
Mike Harkey	12	61.1	4	3	4.55	28
Russ Springer	19	51.2	1	2	6.10	38

===== Relief pitchers =====
Note: G = Games pitched; W = Wins; L = Losses; SV = Saves; ERA = Earned run average; SO = Strikeouts

Player	G	W	L	SV	ERA	SO
Lee Smith	52	0	5	37	3.47	43
Troy Percival	62	3	2	3	1.95	94
Bob Patterson	62	5	2	0	3.04	41
Mike James	46	3	0	1	3.88	36
Mike Butcher	40	6	1	0	4.73	29
John Habyan	28	1	2	0	4.13	25
Mitch Williams	20	1	2	0	6.75	9
Mark Holzemer	12	0	1	0	5.40	5
Rich Monteleone	9	1	0	0	2.00	5
Ken Edenfield	7	0	0	0	4.26	6
Erik Bennett	1	0	0	0	0.00	0

== Award winners ==
- Jim Abbott, Hutch Award
- Tim Salmon, Silver Slugger Award

1995 Major League Baseball All-Star Game

- Gary DiSarcina, shortstop, reserve
- Jim Edmonds, outfield, reserve
- Chuck Finley, pitcher, reserve
- Lee Smith, pitcher, reserve

== Farm system ==
Level	Team	League	Manager
AAA	Vancouver Canadians	Pacific Coast League	Don Long
AA	Midland Angels	Texas League	Mario Mendoza
A	Lake Elsinore Storm	California League	Mitch Seoane
A	Cedar Rapids Kernels	Midwest League	Tom Lawless
A-Short Season	Boise Hawks	Northwest League	Tom Kotchman
Rookie	AZL Angels	Arizona League	Bruce Hines

LEAGUE CHAMPIONS: Boise

Records
Preceded by 1994	California Angels seasons 1995	Succeeded by 1996
