= Boise Hawks =

American minor-league professional baseball team

- Founded in 1987; Boise, Idaho
Team logo
Cap insignia

Minor league affiliations
- Class: Independent ( 2021-Present)
- Previous classes: Class A Short Season (1987–2020)
- League: Pioneer League (2021–present)
- Previous leagues: Northwest League (1987–2020)

Major league affiliations
- Team: Independent (2021–Present)
- Previous teams: Colorado Rockies (2015–2020); Chicago Cubs (2001–2014); California/Anaheim Angels (1990–2000); Independent (1987–1989)

Minor league titles
- League titles (6): 1991; 1993; 1994; 1995; 2002; 2004
- Division titles (10): 1991; 1993; 1994; 1995; 1997; 2001; 2002; 2004; 2006; 2012; 2021

Team data
- Name: Boise Hawks (1987–present)
- Colors: City of trees green, deep brick red, sunshine orange, muted-yellow corn silk, white
- Mascot: Humphrey the Hawk
- Ballpark: Memorial Stadium (1989–present)
- Previous parks: Wigle Field (1987–1988)
- Owner(s)/ Operator(s): Boise Baseball, LLC
- General manager: Mike Van Hise
- Manager: Sean Persky
- Website: boisehawks.com

The Boise Hawks are an independent baseball team of the Pioneer League, which is not affiliated with Major League Baseball (MLB) but is an MLB Partner League. Home games are played at Memorial Stadium in unincorporated Ada County, Idaho, near Boise. (Note: Memorial Stadium has a Boise postal address.)

From their establishment in 1987 through 2020, the Hawks were members of the Class A Short Season Northwest League. In conjunction with a contraction of Minor League Baseball in 2021, the team shifted to the Pioneer League, which was converted from an MLB-affiliated rookie league to an independent baseball league and granted status as an MLB Partner League.

== History ==
Prior to moving to the Boise area, the team was the Tri-Cities Triplets, who played in Richland, Washington, for four seasons after moving over from Walla Walla in 1983. An affiliate of the Texas Rangers for the first two seasons in Richland, they operated as an independent in 1985 and 1986. The Triplets were sold in the fall of 1986 to Diamond Sports and moved to Idaho for the 1987 season. Diamond Sports was headed by the Triplets' general manager Mal Fichman.

Their debut game was on the road and drew over 7,100 at Spokane, aided by the appearance of Hank Aaron. Continuing as an independent for their first three seasons in Boise, they joined the California Angels organization in 1990; the Angels were previously affiliated with the Bend Bucks for two seasons. The Hawks made the playoffs that first season under the Angels and then won the league title four times in the next five years.

After eleven seasons with the Angels, the Hawks moved their affiliation in 2001 to the Chicago Cubs, who were with the Eugene Emeralds for the two previous seasons. Under the Cubs, the Hawks won two league titles and were runners-up three times. After fourteen years with Chicago, the Hawks switched in 2015 to the Rockies, who were previously affiliated with the Tri-City Dust Devils in Pasco for fourteen seasons. The Boise Hawks had the “Dream Team” in 2012. This team had future big leaguers: Dan Vogelbach, Willson Contreras, Albert Almora Jr., Feliz Pena, Stephen Bruno, Marco Hernández, Trey Martin, Yasiel Balancourt, and Pierce Johnson. They also had the MILB Nickname Champ: Rock Shoulders

Due to the COVID-19 pandemic, the entire 2020 season for the minor leagues was cancelled. The following winter, as part the reorganization of minor league baseball, the Northwest League was elevated to the classification of High Single-A and renamed High-A West. The league was contracted to six teams and the Hawks were not extended an invitation to continue as a franchise affiliated with a major league organization. The franchise announced they will continue as members of the independent Pioneer League, an MLB Partner League.

Prior to the cancelation of the 2020 season and subsequent minor league reorganization, the team was slated to appear as the "Boise Papas Fritas" in six 2020 home games as part of the "Copa de Diversion" program.

== Ballparks ==
The Hawks play their home games at Memorial Stadium in Garden City, north of the Western Idaho Fairgrounds. The facility on the banks of the Boise River has a seating capacity of 3,500; it opened in 1989 for the Hawks' third season, its last without an affiliation. The stadium was privately built by an investor group led by Bill Pereira and son Cord Pereira. For their first two seasons, the Hawks played their home games at Bill Wigle Field on the campus of Borah High School.

A proposal to build Boise Sports Park, a new ballpark that could also be used by a minor-league soccer team, was announced by the Hawks ownership group in 2017. The original proposed site for the stadium drew opposition from local residents and was replaced by a new location in the West End neighborhood. In 2018, Boise voters approved an ordinance that would require a citywide election on any sports stadium with public funding, which included the Sports Park proposal. The ordinance and other financial issues led to the project being shelved in December 2019.

== Previous Boise teams ==
Prior to the Hawks, Boise hosted two Northwest League franchises in the 1970s. The Boise A's played two seasons (1975, 1976), then relocated to Canada at Medicine Hat, Alberta. In 1978, the Boise Buckskins played just one season, went bankrupt, and ceased operations. Both clubs played at Borah Field (now Bill Wigle Field).

Boise had been a longtime member of the Pioneer League, then in Class C. The teams were originally known as the Pilots, then as the Yankees (1952, 1953). The club reverted to the Pilots moniker in 1954. Upon signing a player development contract with the Milwaukee Braves, Boise became the Braves and continued the relationship until 1963. Renowned broadcaster Bob Uecker played catcher for the league champion Boise Braves in 1956 and 1958. The Pioneer League teams played at Airway Park, later known as Braves Field, about a half mile (0.8 km) east of Bronco Stadium, in Municipal Park in east Boise, now the site of the headquarters of the Idaho Department of Fish and Game.

== Ownership and media ==
The Boise Hawks are owned by Agon Sports & Entertainment LLC, and the company president is Jeff Eisemann.

== Season-by-season record ==
Season	PDC	Division	Finish	Wins	Losses	Win%	Postseason	Manager	Attendance
Boise Hawks
1987	—	North	4th	26	50	.342		Mal Fichman	71,344
1988	—	North	3rd	30	46	.395		Mal Fichman	67,524
1989	—	North	2nd	35	40	.467		Mal Fichman	127,594
1990	CAL	South	1st	53	23	.697	Lost to Spokane in championship series 1-2	Tom Kotchman	124,270
1991	CAL	South	1st	50	26	.658	Defeated Yakima in championship series 2-0	Tom Kotchman	132,611
1992	CAL	South	2nd	40	36	.526		Tom Kotchman	145,138
1993	CAL	South	1st	41	35	.539	Defeated Bellingham in championship series 2-0	Tom Kotchman	151,080
1994	CAL	South	1st	44	32	.579	Defeated Yakima in championship series 2-1	Tom Kotchman	156,950
1995	CAL	South	1st	48	27	.640	Defeated Bellingham in championship series 2-1	Tom Kotchman	165,255
1996	CAL	South	2nd	43	33	.566		Tom Kotchman	148,282
1997	ANA	North	1st	51	25	.671	Lost to Portland in championship series 2-3	Tom Kotchman	154,819
1998	ANA	North	1st	47	29	.618	Defeated Spokane in division play-off 1-0; Lost to Salem-Keizer in championship series 0-2	Tom Kotchman	152,496
1999	ANA	North	2nd	43	33	.566		Tom Kotchman	132,885
2000	ANA	East	2nd	41	35	.539		Tom Kotchman	133,715
Boise Hawks
2001	CHC	East	1st	52	23	.693	Lost to Salem-Keizer in championship series 0-3	Steve McFarland	99,840
2002	CHC	East	1st	49	27	.645	Defeated Everett in championship series 3-0	Steve McFarland	109,646
2003	CHC	East	4th	27	49	.355		Steve McFarland	104,156
2004	CHC	East	1st	42	34	.553	Defeated Vancouver in championship series 3-0	Tom Beyers	107,936
2005	CHC	East	3rd	34	42	.447		Trey Forkerway	109,746
2006	CHC	East	1st	44	32	.579	Lost to Salem-Keizer in championship series 1-3	Steve McFarland	108,876
Boise Hawks
2007	CHC	East	2nd	37	39	.487		Tom Beyers	102,878
2008	CHC	East	2nd	43	33	.566		Tom Beyers	109,802
2009	CHC	East	3rd	34	42	.447		Casey Kopitzke	103,783
2010	CHC	East	3rd	34	42	.453		Jody Davis	105,671
2011	CHC	East	2nd	36	40	.474	Lost to Tri-City division series 0-2	Mark Johnson	98,860
2012	CHC	East	1st	37	39	.487	Defeated Yakima in division series 2-1; Lost to Vancouver in championship series 1-2	Mark Johnson	91,167
2013	CHC	South	2nd	41	35	.539	Defeated Salem-Keizer in division series 2-0; Lost Vancouver in championship series 1-2	Gary Van Tol	91,324
2014	CHC	South	2nd	41	35	.539	Lost to Hillsboro in division series 0-2	Gary Van Tol	87,519
2015	COL	South	4th	30	46	.395		Frank Gonzalez	109,945
2016	COL	South	3rd	33	44	.434		Andy González	114,476
2017	COL	South	3rd	37	39	.487		Scott Little	121,455
2018	COL	South	3rd	35	41	.461		Scott Little	126,192
2019	COL	South	4th	27	49	.355		Steve Soliz	129,805

Division winner	League champions

== Roster ==
Boise Hawks roster
Active (25-man) roster		Coaching staff
Pitchers: 27 Braden Carmichael; 1 Cameron Dayton; 25 Richard Dell; 23 Graham Edwards; 16 Carter Gannaway; 45 Murphy Gienger; 14 Bardy Gilmore; 13 Hylan Hall; 41 Jack Leary; 99 Jeremiah Locklear; 21 Connor Markl; 46 Blake McFadden; 88 Trevor McGee; 5 Bryan Perez; 28 Tony Roca; 9 Chaney Trout; 26 Quinn Waterhouse; Utility players: 42 Chase Engelhard; 20 Coleton Horner; 18 Max Jung-Goldberg; 10 John Pyle; 3 Ethan Underwood; 12 Bryson Vaughn	Catchers: 15 Ryan Grabosch; 33 J. C. Santini; Infielders: 11 Jeremiah Begora; 38 Taylor Darden; 4 Paul Myro IV; Outfielders: 8 Jake Hjelle; 6 Joseph Kalafut; 24 Jaylon Lee; 7 Noah Marcelo	Manager: -- Kash Beauchamp; Coaches: -- Dakota Conners (infield); -- Bryan Kloppe (pitching); -- Sean Persky (hitting); Disabled list; ‡ Inactive list; § Suspended list; updated July 2, 2025

== Notable alumni ==
- Oreste Marrero (1989)
- Reggie Williams (1989)
- Ken Edenfield (1990)
- Hilly Hathaway (1990)
- Phil Leftwich (1990)
- Darryl Scott (1990)
- Paul Swingle (1990)
- Mark Dalesandro (1990)
- P.J. Forbes (1990)
- J.R. Phillips (1990)
- Garret Anderson (1990)
- Troy Percival (1990–1991)
- Orlando Palmeiro (1991)
- Chris Pritchett (1991)
- Mark Sweeney (1991)
- Chris Turner (1991)
- Eduardo Pérez (1991)
- Anthony Chavez (1992)
- Jeff Schmidt (1992)
- Bill Simas (1992)
- Ryan Hancock (1993)
- Jamie Burke (1993)
- Todd Greene (1993)
- Aaron Guiel (1993)
- Jason Dickson (1994)
- Mike Holtz (1994)
- Bret Hemphill (1994)
- Justin Baughman (1995)
- Trent Durrington (1995)
- Juan Alvarez (1995)
- Brian Cooper (1995)
- Jarrod Washburn (1995)
- Trent Durrington (1996)
- Ramon Ortiz (1996)
- Brandon Puffer (1996)
- Jerrod Riggan (1996)
- Greg Jones (1997)
- Doug Nickle (1997)
- Scot Shields (1997)
- Matt Wise (1997)
- Alfredo Amézaga (1999)
- Tom Gregorio (1999)
- Gary Johnson (1999)
- Robb Quinlan (1999)
- Dusty Bergman (1999)
- John Lackey (1999)
- Francisco Rodríguez (1999)
- Tommy Murphy (2000)
- Joel Peralta (2000)
- Angel Guzman (2001)
- Sergio Mitre (2001)
- Carmen Pignatiello (2001)
- Felix Sanchez (2001)
- Dontrelle Willis (2001)
- Geovany Soto (2002)
- Micah Hoffpauir (2002)
- Randy Wells (2002)
- Ryan O'Malley (2002)
- Clay Rapada (2002)
- Jae Kuk Ryu (2002)
- Andy Sisco (2002)
- Ricky Nolasco (2002)
- Robinson Chirinos (2002)
- Felix Pie (2002)
- Ronny Cedeno (2002)
- Jose Reyes (catcher) (2003)
- Sean Marshall (2003)
- Rich Hill (2003)
- Rocky Cherry (2003)
- Adalberto Mendez (2003)
- Billy Petrick (2003)
- Luis Montanez (2004)
- Mitch Atkins (2005)
- Donnie Veal (2005)
- Jose Ceda (2006)
- Billy Petrick (2006)
- Russ Canzler (2006)
- Blake Lalli (2006)
- Jeff Samardzija (2006)
- Welington Castillo (2006)
- Tyler Colvin (2006)
- Darin Downs (2006)
- Jerry Blevins (2006)
- Josh Vitters (2007)
- Alberto Cabrera (2007)
- Marcus Hatley (2007)
- Josh Donaldson (2007)
- Brandon Guyer (2007)
- Steve Clevenger (2007)
- Blake Parker (2007)
- Al Albuquerque (2007)
- Jeff Beliveau (2008)
- Chris Carpenter (2008)
- Erik Hamren (2008)
- Marcus Hatley (2008)
- Jay Jackson (2008)
- Marwin González (2008)
- Josh Harrison (2008)
- Andrew Cashner (2008)
- Casey Coleman (2008)
- Ryan Flaherty (2008)
- Brooks Raley (2009)
- Chris Rusin (2009)
- Logan Watkins (2009)
- Brett Jackson (2009)
- Tony Campana (2010)
- Justin Bour (2010)
- Arismendy Alcantara (2010)
- Dallas Beeler (2010)
- Eric Jokisch (2010)
- Elliot Soto (2010)
- Matt Szczur (2010)
- Javier Baez (2011)
- Rafael Lopez (2011)
- Andrew McKirahan (2011)
- Tony Zych (2011)
- Tayler Scott (2012)
- Dong-Yub Kim (2012) (KBO)
- Willson Contreras (2012)
- Marco Hernández (2012)
- Pierce Johnson (2012)
- Jeimer Candelario (2012)
- Felix Pena (2012)
- Albert Almora (2012)
- Dan Vogelbach (2012)
- Kris Bryant (2013)
- Jacob Hannemann (2013)
- Duane Underwood (2013)
- Erick Castillo (2013)
- Paul Blackburn (2013)
- Zack Godley (2013)
- Kyle Schwarber (2014)
- James Norwood (2014)
- David Bote (2014)
- Adbert Alzolay (2014)
- Mark Zagunis (2014)
- Gleyber Torres (2014)
- Dillon Maples (2014)
- Justin Lawrence (2015)
- Tyler Matzek (2015)
- Yonathan Daza (2015)
- Kevin Padlo (2015)
- David Dahl (2015)
- Tyler Nevin (2015)
- Julian Fernandez (2016)
- Rico Garcia (2016)
- Antonio Santos (2016)
- Garrett Hampson (2016)
- Sean Bouchard (2017)
- Stephen Cardullo (2017)
- Jairo Diaz (2018)
- Terrin Vavra (2018)
- Riley Pint (2018)
- Willie MacIver (2018)
- PJ Poulin (2018)
- Isaac Collins (2019)
- Aaron Schunk (2019)
- Michael Toglia (2019)
- Ezequiel Tovar (2019)
- Zach Penrod (2021–22)

World Series champions

- Orlando Palmeiro - 2002 Angels
- Alfredo Amézaga - 2002 Angels
- Ramon Ortiz - 2022 Angels
- Matt Wise - 2002 Angels
- Dennis Cook - 2002 Angels
- Scott Shields - 2002 Angels
- Francisco Rodríguez – 2002 Angels
- Garret Anderson – 2002 Angels
- Jarrod Washburn – 2002 Angels
- John Lackey – 2002 Angels, 2013 Red Sox, 2016 Cubs
- Dontrelle Willis – 2003 Marlins
- Kris Bryant – 2016 Cubs
- Kyle Schwarber – 2016 Cubs
- Wilson Contreras – 2016 Cubs
- Albert Almora – 2016 Cubs
- Matt Szczur – 2016 Cubs
- Felix Pena - 2016 Cubs
- Rob Zastryzny - 2016 Cubs
- Joel Peralta - 2016 Cubs
- Jeimer Candelario - 2016 Cubs
- Marwin Gonzalez - 2017 Astros
- Marco Hernández - 2018 Red Sox (injured)
- Tyler Matzek - 2021 Braves

== See also ==
- Boise Hawks players (1987–present)
- Boise Buckskins players (1978)
- Boise A's players (1975–1976)
- Boise Braves players (1955–1963)
- Boise Pilots players (1939–1942, 1946–1951, 1954)
- Boise Yankees players (1952–1953)

== Notes ==
Preceded by Tri-Cities Triplets	Baseball franchise 1987–present With: Northwest League (1987–2020); Pioneer League (from 2021)	Succeeded by Current
