= 1996 New York Yankees season =

Season for the Major League Baseball team the New York Yankees

1996 New York Yankees
- World Series champions American League champions American League East champions
- League: American League
- Division: East
- Ballpark: Yankee Stadium
- City: New York City
- Record: 92–70 (.568)
- Divisional place: 1st
- Owners: George Steinbrenner
- General managers: Bob Watson
- Managers: Joe Torre
- Television: WPIX (Phil Rizzuto, Bobby Murcer, Rick Cerone, Suzyn Waldman); MSG (Jim Kaat, Dave Cohen, Al Trautwig)
- Radio: WABC (AM) (John Sterling, Michael Kay)

The 1996 New York Yankees season was the 94th season for the New York Yankees of Major League Baseball. The Yankees played its home games at Yankee Stadium in the Bronx.

In Joe Torre's first season as manager, the team finished first in the American League Eastern Division with a record of 92–70, 4 games ahead of the Baltimore Orioles, for their first division title since 1981 (although the 1994 team had the best record in the American League and appeared to be on its way to winning the division when the season was ended prematurely by the players' strike).

The Yankees defeated the Texas Rangers, three games to one, in the American League Division Series, then defeated the Orioles in the American League Championship Series, four games to one.

In the World Series the Yankees beat the defending World Series champion Atlanta Braves, four games to two, for the club's 23rd World Series title and its first since 1978, winning four straight games after losing the first two at home. They finished the post-season with an 8–0 record on the road while going just 3–4 at home.

It was the final season for Hall of Fame announcer Phil Rizzuto, who retired after a forty-year career as a radio and TV announcer for Yankee games.

== Offseason ==
- November 2, 1995: The Yankees name Joe Torre as their new manager.
- December 4, 1995: Jalal Leach was drafted by the Montreal Expos from the New York Yankees in the 1995 minor league draft.
- December 7, 1995: Russ Davis and Sterling Hitchcock were traded by the Yankees to the Seattle Mariners for Tino Martinez, Jeff Nelson and Jim Mecir.
- December 11, 1995: Mariano Duncan was signed as a free agent by the Yankees.
- December 21, 1995: David Cone was signed as a free agent by the Yankees.
- December 28, 1995: The Yankees traded a player to be named later to the Chicago White Sox for Tim Raines. The Yankees completed the deal by sending Blaise Kozeniewski to the White Sox on February 6, 1996.
- February 20, 1996: Dwight Gooden was signed as a free agent by the Yankees.
- February 24, 1996: Tim McIntosh was signed as a free agent by the Yankees.
- March 31, 1996: Rafael Quirico was released by the Yankees.

== Regular season ==
=== Notable transactions ===
- June 4, 1996: 1996 Major League Baseball draft
  - Nick Johnson was drafted by the Yankees in the 3rd round. Player signed June 14, 1996.
  - Scott Seabol was drafted by the Yankees in the 88th round. Player signed June 25, 1996.
- June 12, 1996: Rich Monteleone was traded by the Yankees to the California Angels for Mike Aldrete.
- June 12, 1996: Wally Whitehurst was selected off waivers by the Yankees from the Montreal Expos.
- July 4, 1996: Darryl Strawberry was purchased by the Yankees from the St. Paul Saints.
- July 31, 1996: Rubén Sierra and Matt Drews (minors) were traded by the Yankees to the Detroit Tigers for Cecil Fielder.
- July 31, 1996: Dave Weathers was traded by the Florida Marlins to the New York Yankees for Mark Hutton.
- August 22, 1996: Luis Sojo was selected off waivers by the Yankees from the Seattle Mariners.
- August 23, 1996: Bob Wickman and Gerald Williams were traded by the Yankees to the Milwaukee Brewers for Pat Listach, Graeme Lloyd and a player to be named later. The Brewers completed the trade by sending Ricky Bones to the Yankees on August 29.
- August 30, 1996: The Yankees traded a player to be named later to the Pittsburgh Pirates for Charlie Hayes. The Yankees completed the deal by sending Chris Corn to the Pirates on August 31.
- September 6, 1996: Robert Eenhoorn was selected off waivers from the Yankees by the California Angels.
- September 12, 1996: Wally Whitehurst was released by the Yankees.

=== Season standings ===
AL East
| Team | W | L | Pct. | GB | Home | Road |
|---|---|---|---|---|---|---|
| New York Yankees | 92 | 70 | .568 | — | 49‍–‍31 | 43‍–‍39 |
| Baltimore Orioles | 88 | 74 | .543 | 4 | 43‍–‍38 | 45‍–‍36 |
| Boston Red Sox | 85 | 77 | .525 | 7 | 47‍–‍34 | 38‍–‍43 |
| Toronto Blue Jays | 74 | 88 | .457 | 18 | 35‍–‍46 | 39‍–‍42 |
| Detroit Tigers | 53 | 109 | .327 | 39 | 27‍–‍54 | 26‍–‍55 |

=== Record vs. opponents ===
1996 American League record Source: MLB Standings Grid – 1996
| Team | BAL | BOS | CAL | CWS | CLE | DET | KC | MIL | MIN | NYY | OAK | SEA | TEX | TOR |
|---|---|---|---|---|---|---|---|---|---|---|---|---|---|---|
| Baltimore | — | 7–6 | 6–6 | 4–8 | 5–7 | 11–2 | 9–3 | 9–3 | 7–5 | 3–10 | 9–4 | 7–5 | 3–10–1 | 8–5 |
| Boston | 6–7 | — | 8–4 | 6–6 | 1–11 | 12–1 | 3–9 | 7–5 | 6–6 | 7–6 | 8–5 | 7–6 | 6–6 | 8–5 |
| California | 6–6 | 4–8 | — | 6–6 | 4–9 | 6–6 | 4–8 | 7–5 | 4–8 | 7–6 | 6–7 | 5–8 | 4–9 | 7–5 |
| Chicago | 8–4 | 6–6 | 6–6 | — | 5–8 | 10–3 | 7–6 | 6–7 | 6–7 | 6–7 | 5–7 | 5–7 | 8–4 | 7–5 |
| Cleveland | 7–5 | 11–1 | 9–4 | 8–5 | — | 12–0 | 7–6 | 7–6 | 10–3 | 3–9 | 6–6 | 8–4 | 4–8 | 7–5 |
| Detroit | 2–11 | 1–12 | 6–6 | 3–10 | 0–12 | — | 6–6 | 4–8 | 6–6 | 5–8 | 4–8 | 6–6 | 4–9 | 6–7 |
| Kansas City | 3–9 | 9–3 | 8–4 | 6–7 | 6–7 | 6–6 | — | 4–9 | 6–7 | 4–8 | 5–7 | 7–5 | 6–6 | 5–8 |
| Milwaukee | 3–9 | 5–7 | 5–7 | 7–6 | 6–7 | 8–4 | 9–4 | — | 9–4 | 6–6 | 7–5 | 4–9 | 6–7 | 5–7 |
| Minnesota | 5–7 | 6–6 | 8–4 | 7–6 | 3–10 | 6–6 | 7–6 | 4–9 | — | 5–7 | 6–7 | 6–6 | 7–5 | 8–5 |
| New York | 10–3 | 6–7 | 6–7 | 7–6 | 9–3 | 8–5 | 8–4 | 6–6 | 7–5 | — | 9–3 | 3–9 | 5–7 | 8–5 |
| Oakland | 4–9 | 5–8 | 7–6 | 7–5 | 6–6 | 8–4 | 7–5 | 5–7 | 7–6 | 3–9 | — | 8–5 | 7–6 | 4–8 |
| Seattle | 5–7 | 6–7 | 8–5 | 7–5 | 4–8 | 6–6 | 5–7 | 9–4 | 6–6 | 9–3 | 5–8 | — | 10–3 | 5–7 |
| Texas | 10–3–1 | 6–6 | 9–4 | 4–8 | 8–4 | 9–4 | 6–6 | 7–6 | 5–7 | 7–5 | 6–7 | 3–10 | — | 10–2 |
| Toronto | 5–8 | 5–8 | 5–7 | 5–7 | 5–7 | 7–6 | 8–5 | 7–5 | 5–8 | 5–8 | 8–4 | 7–5 | 2–10 | — |

=== Roster ===
1996 New York Yankees
Roster
| Pitchers: 41 Brian Boehringer; 29 Ricky Bones; 59 Billy Brewer; 36 David Cone; 39 Paul Gibson; 11 Dwight Gooden; 57 Steve Howe; 52 Mark Hutton; 28 Scott Kamieniecki; 22 Jimmy Key; 27 Graeme Lloyd; 54 Jim Mecir; 57 Ramiro Mendoza; 43 Jeff Nelson; 47 Dave Pavlas; 46 Andy Pettitte; 56 Dale Polley; 42 Mariano Rivera; 17 Kenny Rogers; 52 David Weathers; 35 John Wetteland; 55 Wally Whitehurst; 27 Bob Wickman | Catchers: 25 Joe Girardi; 13 Jim Leyritz; 60 Tim McIntosh; 55 Jorge Posada; Infielders: 12 Wade Boggs; 18 Mariano Duncan; 20 Robert Eenhoorn; 45 Cecil Fielder; 26 Andy Fox; 33 Charlie Hayes; 38,99 Matt Howard; 2 Derek Jeter; 14 Pat Kelly; 24 Tino Martinez; 19 Luis Sojo | Outfielders: 20 Mike Aldrete; 39 Dion James; 21 Paul O'Neill; 31 Tim Raines; 28 Rubén Rivera; 25 Rubén Sierra; 39 Darryl Strawberry; 51 Bernie Williams; 29 Gerald Williams; Other batters: 39 Matt Luke | Manager: 6 Joe Torre; Coaches: 53 José Cardenal (First Base); 50 Chris Chambliss (Hitting); 40 Tony Cloninger (Bullpen); 30 Willie Randolph (Third Base); 34 Mel Stottlemyre (Pitching); 48 Don Zimmer (Bench) |

== Game log ==
=== Regular season ===
Legend
| | Yankees win |
| | Yankees loss |
| | Yankees tie |
| | Postponement |
| | Clinched division |
| **Bold** | Yankees team member |

1996 regular season game log: 92–70 (Home: 49–31; Away: 43–39)
April: 13–10 (Home: 7–3; Away: 6–7)

| # | Date | Time (ET) | Opponent | Score | Win | Loss | Save | Time of Game | Attendance | Record | Box/ Streak |
|---|---|---|---|---|---|---|---|---|---|---|---|
| — | April 1 | 1:05 p.m. EST | @ Indians | **Postponed (Snow)** (Makeup date: April 4) | | | | | | | |
| 1 | April 2 | 1:08 p.m. EST | @ Indians | **W** 7–1 | **Cone** (1–0) | Martínez (0–1) | — | 3:08 | 42,289 | 1–0 | W1 |
| 2 | April 3 | 7:05 p.m. EST | @ Indians | **W** 5–1 | **Pettitte** (1–0) | McDowell (0–1) | **Nelson** (1) | 3:18 | 41,843 | 2–0 | W2 |
| — | April 4 | 7:05 p.m. EST | @ Indians | **Postponed (Rain)** (Makeup date: June 21) | | | | | | | |
| 3 | April 6 | @ Rangers | 2–4 | Witt | **Key** (0–1) | Henneman | 35,510 | 2–1 | | | |
| 4 | April 7 | @ Rangers | 2–7 | Hill | **Gooden** (0–1) | — | — | 2–2 | | | |
| 5 | April 7 | @ Rangers | 1–4 | Pavlik | **Howe** (0–1) | Vosberg | 36,248 | 2–3 | | | |
| 6 | April 9 | Royals | 7–3 | **Pettitte** (2–0) | Haney | — | 56,329 | 3–3 | | | |
| 7 | April 11 | Royals | 5–3 | **Key** (1–1) | Belcher | **Howe** (1) | 17,519 | 4–3 | | | |
| 8 | April 12 | Rangers | 4–3 | **Cone** (2–0) | Hill | **Wetteland** (1) | 20,238 | 5–3 | | | |
| 9 | April 13 | Rangers | 6–10 | Pavlik | **Gooden** (0–2) | Vosberg | 19,603 | 5–4 | | | |
| 10 | April 14 | Rangers | 12–3 | **Pettitte** (3–0) | Gross | — | 20,181 | 6–4 | | | |
| 11 | April 16 | @ Brewers | 3–6 | Karl | **Key** (1–2) | — | 7,059 | 6–5 | | | |
| 12 | April 17 | @ Brewers | 4–8 | Bones | **Cone** (2–1) | — | 7,124 | 6–6 | | | |
| 13 | April 19 | @ Twins | 1–7 | Rodriguez | **Gooden** (0–3) | — | 20,279 | 6–7 | | | |
| 14 | April 20 | @ Twins | 7–6 | **Wickman** (1–0) | Guardado | **Wetteland** (2) | 24,586 | 7–7 | | | |
| 15 | April 21 | @ Twins | 9–5 | **Rogers** (1–0) | Radke | — | 20,115 | 8–7 | | | |
| 16 | April 22 | @ Royals | 6–2 | **Cone** (3–1) | Appier | — | 14,763 | 9–7 | | | |
| 17 | April 23 | @ Royals | 2–5 | Gubicza | **Key** (1–3) | Montgomery | 12,536 | 9–8 | | | |
| 18 | April 24 | 7:36 p.m. EDT | Indians | **W** 10–8 | **Kamieniecki** (1–0) | Martinez (3–2) | — | 3:37 | 20,187 | 10–8 | W1 |
| 19 | April 25 | 7:36 p.m. EDT | Indians | L 3–4 | Poole (1–0) | **Pettitte** (3–1) | Mesa (7) | 3:07 | 18,580 | 10–9 | L1 |
| 20 | April 26 | Twins | 5–4 | **Rivera** (1–0) | Radke | **Wetteland** (3) | 14,450 | 11–9 | | | |
| 21 | April 27 | Twins | 6–8 (10) | Bennett | **Wickman** (1–1) | — | 20,025 | 11–10 | | | |
| 22 | April 28 | Twins | 6–3 | **Rivera** (2–0) | Rodriguez | **Wetteland** (4) | 24,793 | 12–10 | | | |
| 23 | April 30 | 7:36 p.m. EDT | @ Orioles | **W** 13–10 | **Nelson** (1–0) | Shepherd (0–1) | **Wetteland** (5) | 4:21 | 43,117 | 13–10 | W2 |

May: 16–11 (Home: 11–5; Away: 5–6)

| # | Date | Time (ET) | Opponent | Score | Win | Loss | Save | Time of Game | Attendance | Record | Box/ Streak |
|---|---|---|---|---|---|---|---|---|---|---|---|
| 24 | May 1 | 7:35 p.m. EDT | @ Orioles | **W** 11–6 (15) | **Pettitte** (4–1) | Mercker (2–2) | — | 5:34 | 47,472 | 14–10 | W3 |
| 25 | May 2 | White Sox | 5–1 | **Cone** (4–1) | Fernandez | — | 19,773 | 15–10 | | | |
| 26 | May 3 | White Sox | 2–0 | **Rivera** (3–0) | Thomas | **Wetteland** (6) | 15,599 | 16–10 | | | |
| 27 | May 4 | White Sox | 5–11 | Karchner | **Nelson** (1–1) | — | 20,661 | 16–11 | | | |
| 28 | May 5 | White Sox | 7–1 | **Pettitte** (5–1) | Tapani | — | 26,525 | 17–11 | | | |
| 29 | May 6 | Tigers | 10–5 | **Wickman** (2–1) | Myers | — | 12,838 | 18–11 | | | |
| 30 | May 7 | Tigers | 12–5 | **Mecir** (1–0) | Lewis | **Nelson** (2) | 12,760 | 19–11 | | | |
| 31 | May 8 | Tigers | 10–3 | **Gooden** (1–3) | Keagle | — | 18,729 | 20–11 | | | |
| 32 | May 9 | Tigers | 2–4 | Gohr | **Key** (1–4) | Myers | 13,098 | 20–12 | | | |
| 33 | May 10 | @ White Sox | 2–5 | Tapani | **Pettitte** (5–2) | Hernandez | 15,784 | 20–13 | | | |
| 34 | May 11 | @ White Sox | 5–7 | McCaskill | **Wetteland** (0–1) | — | 25,722 | 20–14 | | | |
| 35 | May 12 | @ White Sox | 9–8 | **Wickman** (3–1) | Thomas | **Wetteland** (7) | 17,405 | 21–14 | | | |
| 36 | May 14 | Mariners | 2–0 | **Gooden** (2–3) | Hitchcock | — | 20,786 | 22–14 | | | |
| 37 | May 15 | Mariners | 5–10 | Hurtado | **Key** (1–5) | — | 20,680 | 22–15 | | | |
| 38 | May 17 | Angels | 8–5 | **Pettitte** (6–2) | Abbott | **Rivera** (1) | 19,087 | 23–15 | | | |
| 39 | May 18 | Angels | 7–3 | **Rogers** (2–0) | Williams | **Rivera** (2) | 22,821 | 24–15 | | | |
| 40 | May 19 | Angels | 1–10 | Finley | **Kamieniecki** (1–1) | — | 37,326 | 24–16 | | | |
| 41 | May 21 | Athletics | 7–3 | **Gooden** (3–3) | Reyes | — | 15,614 | 25–16 | | | |
| 42 | May 22 | Athletics | 1–5 | Wojciechowski | **Pettitte** (6–3) | Mohler | 18,544 | 25–17 | | | |
| 43 | May 23 | Athletics | 4–3 | **Rogers** (3–0) | Taylor | **Wetteland** (8) | 19,315 | 26–17 | | | |
| 44 | May 24 | @ Mariners | 4–10 | Hitchcock | **Kamieniecki** (1–2) | — | 44,236 | 26–18 | | | |
| 45 | May 25 | @ Mariners | 5–4 | **Mendoza** (1–0) | Hurtado | **Wetteland** (9) | 57,173 | 27–18 | | | |
| 46 | May 26 | @ Mariners | 3–4 | Menhart | **Gooden** (3–4) | Charlton | 42,410 | 27–19 | | | |
| 47 | May 27 | @ Angels | 16–5 | **Pettitte** (7–3) | Abbott | — | 20,926 | 28–19 | | | |
| 48 | May 28 | @ Angels | 0–1 | Grimsley | **Rogers** (3–1) | — | 17,284 | 28–20 | | | |
| 49 | May 29 | @ Angels | 0–4 | Finley | **Mendoza** (1–1) | — | 19,246 | 28–21 | | | |
| 50 | May 31 | @ Athletics | 4–1 | **Key** (2–5) | Johns | **Wetteland** (10) | 13,279 | 29–21 | | | |

June: 18–11 (Home: 7–6; Away: 11–5)

| # | Date | Time (ET) | Opponent | Score | Win | Loss | Save | Time of Game | Attendance | Record | Box/ Streak |
|---|---|---|---|---|---|---|---|---|---|---|---|
| 51 | June 1 | @ Athletics | 6–3 | **Pettitte** (8–3) | Chouinard | **Wetteland** (11) | 21,354 | 30–21 | | | |
| 52 | June 2 | @ Athletics | 11–4 | **Rogers** (4–1) | Wojciechowski | **Wetteland** (12) | 26,331 | 31–21 | | | |
| 53 | June 4 | Blue Jays | 5–4 | **Gooden** (4–4) | Hanson | **Wetteland** (13) | 17,368 | 32–21 | | | |
| 54 | June 5 | Blue Jays | 7–12 | Hentgen | **Key** (2–6) | — | 17,142 | 32–22 | | | |
| 55 | June 6 | Blue Jays | 8–1 | **Pettitte** (9–3) | Quantrill | — | 18,475 | 33–22 | | | |
| 56 | June 7 | @ Tigers | 5–6 | Lewis | **Nelson** (1–2) | — | 16,350 | 33–23 | | | |
| 57 | June 8 | @ Tigers | 7–9 | Olson | **Rogers** (4–2) | Lewis | 20,173 | 33–24 | | | |
| 58 | June 9 | @ Tigers | 3–2 | **Gooden** (5–4) | Gohr | **Wetteland** (14) | 16,588 | 34–24 | | | |
| 59 | June 10 | @ Blue Jays | 5–3 | **Key** (3–6) | Hentgen | **Wetteland** (15) | 37,332 | 35–24 | | | |
| 60 | June 11 | @ Blue Jays | 6–4 | **Pettitte** (10–3) | Quantrill | **Wetteland** (16) | 32,114 | 36–24 | | | |
| 61 | June 12 | @ Blue Jays | 4–7 | Janzen | **Mendoza** (1–2) | — | 44,238 | 36–25 | | | |
| 62 | June 13 | 7:35 p.m. EDT | Indians | L 2–6 | Hershiser (6–4) | **Rogers** (4–3) | Shuey (1) | 3:13 | 30,707 | 36–26 | L2 |
| 63 | June 14 | 7:35 p.m. EDT | Indians | **W** 4–3 | **Gooden** (6–4) | Ogea (3–1) | **Wetteland** (17) | 2:59 | 32,580 | 37–26 | W1 |
| 64 | June 15 | 1:05 p.m. EDT | Indians | L 3–10 | Nagy (11–1) | **Boehringer** (0–1) | — | 3:06 | 42,032 | 37–27 | L1 |
| 65 | June 16 | 1:35 p.m. EDT | Indians | **W** 5–4 | **Pettitte** (11–3) | Martinez (8–4) | **Wetteland** (18) | 3:41 | 51,180 | 38–27 | W1 |
| 66 | June 17 | Twins | 3–6 | Aldred | **Mendoza** (1–3) | Naulty | 16,189 | 38–28 | | | |
| 67 | June 18 | Twins | 2–0 | **Rogers** (5–3) | Radke | **Wetteland** (19) | 17,593 | 39–28 | | | |
| 68 (1) | June 21 | 12:03 p.m. EDT | @ Indians | **W** 8–7 (10) | **Nelson** (2–2) | Mesa (0–2) | **Wetteland** (20) | 3:56 | 42,176 | 40–28 | W2 |
| 69 (2) | June 21 | 7:04 p.m. EDT | @ Indians | **W** 9–3 | **Mendoza** (2–3) | Tavárez (2–4) | — | 3:00 | 42,454 | 41–28 | W3 |
| 70 | June 22 | 1:08 p.m. EDT | @ Indians | **W** 11–9 | **Brewer** (1–0) | Martinez (8–5) | **Wetteland** (21) | 4:10 | 42,461 | 42–28 | W4 |
| 71 | June 23 | 1:05 p.m. EDT | @ Indians | **W** 6–5 | **Gooden** (7–4) | McDowell (6–6) | **Wetteland** (22) | 3:16 | 41,767 | 43–28 | W5 |
| 72 | June 24 | @ Twins | 0–3 | Robertson | **Pettitte** (11–4) | — | 20,488 | 43–29 | | | |
| 73 | June 25 | @ Twins | 1–6 | Rodriguez | **Boehringer** (0–2) | — | — | 43–30 | | | |
| 74 | June 25 | @ Twins | 6–2 | **Mendoza** (3–3) | Serafini | — | 16,641 | 44–30 | | | |
| 75 | June 26 | @ Twins | 2–1 | **Polley** (1–0) | Guardado | **Wetteland** (23) | 19,116 | 45–30 | | | |
| 76 | 7:35 p.m. EDT | June 27 | Orioles | **W** 3–2 | **Rogers** (6–3) | Erickson (4–6) | **Wetteland** (24) | 2:40 | 34,161 | 46–30 | W3 |
| 77 | 7:40 p.m. EDT | June 28 | Orioles | L 4–7 | Rhodes (9–0) | **M Rivera** (3–1) | Myers (15) | 3:38 | 43,515 | 46–31 | L1 |
| 78 | 1:05 p.m. EDT | June 29 | Orioles | **W** 4–3 | **Pettitte** (12–4) | Mussina (10–5) | **Wetteland** (25) | 2:47 | 45,295 | 47–31 | W1 |
| 79 | 1:35 p.m. EDT | June 30 | Orioles | L 1–9 | Wells (5–7) | **Mendoza** (3–4) | — | 2:58 | 40,200 | 47–32 | L1 |

July: 16–10 (Home: 10–3; Away: 6–7)

| # | Date | Time (ET) | Opponent | Score | Win | Loss | Save | Time of Game | Attendance | Record | Box/ Streak |
|---|---|---|---|---|---|---|---|---|---|---|---|
| 80 | July 1 | Red Sox | 2–0 | **Key** (4–6) | Clemens | **Wetteland** (26) | 27,734 | 48–32 | | | |
| 81 | July 2 | Red Sox | 7–5 | **Nelson** (3–2) | Hudson | **Wetteland** (27) | 28,310 | 49–32 | | | |
| 82 | July 4 | Brewers | 4–1 | **Pettitte** (13–4) | Karl | **Wetteland** (28) | 24,243 | 50–32 | | | |
| 83 | July 5 | Brewers | 12–3 | **Gooden** (8–4) | Bones | — | 26,699 | 51–32 | | | |
| 84 | July 6 | Brewers | 2–0 | **Key** (5–6) | Sparks | **Wetteland** (29) | 24,033 | 52–32 | | | |
| 85 | July 7 | Brewers | 1–4 | McDonald | **Rogers** (6–4) | Fetters | 35,242 | 52–33 | | | |
| 86 | July 11 | 7:05 p.m. EDT | @ Orioles | **W** 4–2 | **Key** (6–6) | Mussina (11–6) | **Wetteland** (30) | 2:59 | 46,760 | 53–33 | W1 |
| — | July 12 | 7:05 p.m. EDT | @ Orioles | **Postponed (Rain)** (Makeup date: July 13) | | | | | | | |
| 87 (1) | July 13 | 4:05 p.m. EDT | @ Orioles | **W** 3–2 | **Nelson** (4–2) | Wells (5–9) | **Wetteland** (31) | 3:06 | — | 54–33 | W2 |
| 88 (2) | July 13 | 7:05 p.m. EDT | @ Orioles | **W** 7–5 | **Gooden** (9–4) | Rhodes (9–1) | **Wetteland** (32) | 3:28 | 46,451 | 55–33 | W3 |
| 89 | July 14 | 1:37 p.m. | @ Orioles | **W** 4–1 | **Pettitte** (14–4) | Erickson (5–7) | **Wetteland** (33) | 3:04 | 47,658 | 56–33 | W4 |
| 90 | July 15 | @ Red Sox | 6–8 | Wakefield | **Hutton** (0–1) | Slocumb | 33,263 | 56–34 | | | |
| 91 | July 16 | @ Red Sox | 9–5 | **Key** (7–6) | Clemens | — | 34,676 | 57–34 | | | |
| 92 | July 17 | @ Red Sox | 11–12 | Eshelman | **Wetteland** (0–2) | — | 34,082 | 57–35 | | | |
| 93 | July 18 | @ Brewers | 4–16 | Karl | **Gooden** (9–5) | — | 19,079 | 57–36 | | | |
| 94 | July 19 | @ Brewers | 5–7 | Eldred | **Pettitte** (14–5) | Fetters | 19,300 | 57–37 | | | |
| 95 | July 20 | @ Brewers | 4–2 | **Rivera** (4–1) | Van Egmond | **Wetteland** (34) | 25,473 | 58–37 | | | |
| 96 | July 21 | @ Brewers | 2–3 | D'Amico | **Key** (7–7) | Fetters | 25,662 | 58–38 | | | |
| 97 | July 22 | Rangers | 1–6 | Hill | **Rogers** (6–5) | — | 30,767 | 58–39 | | | |
| 98 | July 23 | Rangers | 6–0 | **Gooden** (10–5) | Pavlik | — | 22,814 | 59–39 | | | |
| 99 | July 24 | Rangers | 4–2 | **Pettitte** (15–5) | Alberro | **Wetteland** (35) | 35,308 | 60–39 | | | |
| 100 | July 25 | Royals | 0–7 | Rosado | **Hutton** (0–2) | — | 23,475 | 60–40 | | | |
| 101 | July 26 | Royals | 15–1 | **Key** (8–7) | Haney | — | 23,782 | 61–40 | | | |
| 102 | July 27 | Royals | 5–4 | **Rogers** (7–5) | Belcher | **Wetteland** (36) | 42,044 | 62–40 | | | |
| 103 | July 28 | Royals | 3–2 | **Wetteland** (1–2) | Jacome | — | 35,658 | 63–40 | | | |
| 104 | July 30 | @ Rangers | 2–15 | Witt | **Pettitte** (15–6) | — | 39,637 | 63–41 | | | |
| 105 | July 31 | @ Rangers | 2–9 | Oliver | **Key** (8–8) | — | 30,645 | 63–42 | | | |

August: 13–17 (Home: 7–9; Away: 6–8)

| # | Date | Time (ET) | Opponent | Score | Win | Loss | Save | Time of Game | Attendance | Record | Box/ Streak |
|---|---|---|---|---|---|---|---|---|---|---|---|
| 106 | August 1 | @ Rangers | 6–5 | **Rogers** (8–5) | Hill | **Wetteland** (37) | 34,855 | 64–42 | | | |
| 107 | August 2 | @ Royals | 3–4 (10) | Montgomery | **Rivera** (4–2) | — | 28,618 | 64–43 | | | |
| 108 | August 3 | @ Royals | 4–11 | Linton | **Weathers** (0–1) | — | 29,355 | 64–44 | | | |
| 109 | August 4 | @ Royals | 5–3 | **Pettitte** (16–6) | Rosado | — | 24,624 | 65–44 | | | |
| 110 | August 5 | @ Royals | 5–2 | **Key** (9–8) | Pichardo | **Wetteland** (38) | 22,865 | 66–44 | | | |
| 111 | August 6 | White Sox | 9–2 | **Rogers** (9–5) | Tapani | — | 33,025 | 67–44 | | | |
| 112 | August 7 | White Sox | 4–8 (10) | Hernandez | **Nelson** (4–3) | — | 31,098 | 67–45 | | | |
| 113 | August 8 | White Sox | 8–4 | **Wickman** (4–1) | Andujar | **Rivera** (3) | 35,898 | 68–45 | | | |
| 114 | August 9 | Tigers | 3–5 | Cummings | **Pettitte** (16–7) | Myers | 23,439 | 68–46 | | | |
| 115 | August 10 | Tigers | 7–13 | Lewis | **Key** (9–9) | — | 28,863 | 68–47 | | | |
| 116 | August 11 | Tigers | 12–0 | **Rogers** (10–5) | Lira | — | 33,517 | 69–47 | | | |
| 117 | August 12 | @ White Sox | 2–3 (10) | Hernandez | **Wetteland** (1–3) | — | 32,492 | 69–48 | | | |
| 118 | August 13 | @ White Sox | 4–8 | Bertotti | **Weathers** (0–2) | — | 26,455 | 69–49 | | | |
| 119 | August 14 | @ White Sox | 3–1 | **Pettitte** (17–7) | Baldwin | **Rivera** (4) | 23,350 | 70–49 | | | |
| 120 | August 16 | Mariners | 5–6 | Hitchcock | **Polley** (1–1) | Jackson | 50,724 | 70–50 | | | |
| 121 | August 17 | Mariners | 3–10 | Moyer | **Rogers** (10–6) | — | 51,729 | 70–51 | | | |
| 122 | August 18 | Mariners | 12–13 (12) | Ayala | **Mecir** (1–1) | Jackson | 44,769 | 70–52 | | | |
| 123 | August 19 | Mariners | 10–4 | **Pettitte** (18–7) | Carmona | — | 33,994 | 71–52 | | | |
| 124 | August 20 | Angels | 17–6 | **Boehringer** (1–2) | Springer | — | 20,795 | 72–52 | | | |
| 125 | August 21 | Angels | 1–7 | Dickson | **Key** (9–10) | Percival | 27,811 | 72–53 | | | |
| 126 | August 22 | Angels | 3–12 | Finley | **Rogers** (10–7) | — | 27,191 | 72–54 | | | |
| 127 | August 23 | Athletics | 5–3 | **Gooden** (11–5) | Wengert | **Rivera** (5) | 34,244 | 73–54 | | | |
| 128 | August 24 | Athletics | 5–4 | **Whitehurst** (1–0) | Telgheder | **Pavlas** (1) | 32,125 | 74–54 | | | |
| 129 | August 25 | Athletics | 4–6 | Mohler | **Nelson** (4–4) | Acre | 50,808 | 74–55 | | | |
| 130 | August 26 | @ Mariners | 1–2 | Ayala | **Lloyd** (0–1) | Charlton | 32,857 | 74–56 | | | |
| 131 | August 27 | @ Mariners | 4–7 | Moyer | **Lloyd** (0–2) | — | 32,975 | 74–57 | | | |
| 132 | August 28 | @ Mariners | 2–10 | Mulholland | **Gooden** (11–6) | — | 30,952 | 74–58 | | | |
| 133 | August 29 | @ Angels | 3–14 | Holtz | **Whitehurst** (1–1) | — | 19,755 | 74–59 | | | |
| 134 | August 30 | @ Angels | 6–2 | **Pettitte** (19–7) | Springer | — | 27,084 | 75–59 | | | |
| 135 | August 31 | @ Angels | 14–3 | **Key** (10–10) | Dickson | — | 28,749 | 76–59 | | | |

September: 16–11 (Home: 7–5; Away: 9–6)

| # | Date | Time (ET) | Opponent | Score | Win | Loss | Save | Time of Game | Attendance | Record | Box/ Streak |
|---|---|---|---|---|---|---|---|---|---|---|---|
| 136 | September 1 | @ Angels | 0–4 | Finley | **Rogers** (10–8) | — | 19,384 | 76–60 | | | |
| 137 | September 2 | @ Athletics | 5–0 | **Cone** (5–1) | Prieto | — | 20,159 | 77–60 | | | |
| 138 | September 3 | @ Athletics | 9–10 | Acre | **Boehringer** (1–3) | Johns | 11,621 | 77–61 | | | |
| 139 | September 4 | @ Athletics | 10–3 | **Pettitte** (20–7) | Telgheder | — | 9,892 | 78–61 | | | |
| 140 | September 6 | Blue Jays | 4–3 | **Rivera** (5–2) | Risley | — | 21,528 | 79–61 | | | |
| 141 | September 7 | Blue Jays | 2–3 | Quantrill | **Cone** (5–2) | Timlin | 27,069 | 79–62 | | | |
| 142 | September 8 | Blue Jays | 2–4 | Hanson | **Pettitte** (20–8) | Timlin | 28,575 | 79–63 | | | |
| 143 | September 10 | @ Tigers | 9–8 | **Rivera** (6–2) | Sager | **Wetteland** (39) | 11,042 | 80–63 | | | |
| 144 | September 11 | @ Tigers | 7–3 | **Key** (11–10) | Lira | — | 9,775 | 81–63 | | | |
| 145 | September 12 | @ Tigers | 12–3 | **Cone** (6–2) | Thompson | — | 9,009 | 82–63 | | | |
| 146 | September 13 | @ Blue Jays | 4–1 | **Pettitte** (21–8) | Hanson | **Wetteland** (40) | 31,227 | 83–63 | | | |
| 147 | September 14 | @ Blue Jays | 3–1 | **Boehringer** (2–3) | Hentgen | **Wetteland** (41) | 43,397 | 84–63 | | | |
| 148 | September 15 | @ Blue Jays | 1–3 | Williams | **Mendoza** (3–5) | Timlin | 36,268 | 84–64 | | | |
| 149 | September 16 | @ Blue Jays | 10–0 | **Key** (12–10) | Quantrill | — | 30,115 | 85–64 | | | |
| — | September 17 | 7:35 p.m. EDT | Orioles | **Postponed (Rain)** (Makeup date: September 19) | | | | | | | |
| 150 | September 18 | 7:35 p.m. EDT | Orioles | **W** 3–2 (10) | **M Rivera** (7–2) | Mills (3–2) | — | 3:07 | 40,775 | 86–64 | W2 |
| 151 (1) | September 19 | 4:08 p.m. EDT | Orioles | **W** 9–3 | **Rogers** (11–8) | Mussina (7–2) | — | 3:07 | — | 87–64 | W3 |
| 152 (2) | September 19 | 8:03 p.m. EDT | Orioles | L 9–10 | Mathews (2–1) | **M Rivera** (7–3) | Myers (30) | 3:56 | 54,888 | 87–65 | L1 |
| 153 | September 20 | Red Sox | 2–4 | Wakefield | **Polley** (1–2) | Slocumb | 39,883 | 87–66 | | | |
| 154 | September 21 | Red Sox | 12–11 (10) | **Wetteland** (2–3) | Hudson | — | 54,599 | 88–66 | | | |
| 155 | September 22 | Red Sox | 4–3 | **Rivera** (8–3) | Sele | **Wetteland** (42) | 34,422 | 89–66 | | | |
| 156 | September 23 | Red Sox | 3–4 (11) | Slocumb | **Boehringer** (2–4) | Mahomes | 22,728 | 89–67 | | | |
| 157 | September 25 | Brewers | 19–2 | **Cone** (7–2) | Van Egmond | — | — | 90–67 | | | |
| 158 | September 25 | Brewers | 6–2 | **Rogers** (12–8) | Karl | — | 37,947 | 91–67 | | | |
| 159 | September 26 | @ Red Sox | 3–5 | Maddux | **Key** (12–11) | Slocumb | 32,367 | 91–68 | | | |
| 160 | September 27 | @ Red Sox | 5–7 | Sele | **Gooden** (11–7) | Slocumb | 32,573 | 91–69 | | | |
| 161 | September 28 | @ Red Sox | 4–2 | **Mendoza** (4–5) | Clemens | **Wetteland** (43) | 33,612 | 92–69 | | | |
| 162 | September 29 | @ Red Sox | 5–6 | Mahomes | **Polley** (1–3) | — | 32,563 | 92–70 | | | |

=== Detailed records ===
American League
| Opponent | W | L | WP | RS | RA |
AL East
| Baltimore Orioles | 10 | 3 | 0.769 | 75 | 62 |
| Boston Red Sox | 6 | 7 | 0.462 | 73 | 72 |
| Detroit Tigers | 8 | 5 | 0.615 | 99 | 66 |
| **New York Yankees** | | | | | |
| Toronto Blue Jays | 8 | 5 | 0.615 | 61 | 46 |
| Total | 32 | 20 | 0.615 | 308 | 246 |
AL Central
| Chicago White Sox | 7 | 6 | 0.538 | 65 | 59 |
| Cleveland Indians | 9 | 3 | 0.750 | 73 | 61 |
| Kansas City Royals | 8 | 4 | 0.667 | 60 | 47 |
| Milwaukee Brewers | 6 | 6 | 0.500 | 66 | 54 |
| Minnesota Twins | 7 | 5 | 0.583 | 48 | 51 |
| Total | 37 | 24 | 0.607 | 312 | 272 |
AL West
| California Angels | 6 | 7 | 0.462 | 76 | 76 |
| Oakland Athletics | 9 | 3 | 0.750 | 71 | 45 |
| Seattle Mariners | 3 | 9 | 0.250 | 56 | 80 |
| Texas Rangers | 5 | 7 | 0.417 | 48 | 68 |
| Total | 23 | 26 | 0.469 | 251 | 269 |
| Season Total | 92 | 70 | 0.568 | 871 | 787 |

| Month | Games | Won | Lost | Win % | RS | RA |
|---|---|---|---|---|---|---|
| April | 23 | 13 | 10 | 0.565 | 126 | 115 |
| May | 27 | 16 | 11 | 0.593 | 147 | 124 |
| June | 29 | 18 | 11 | 0.621 | 141 | 141 |
| July | 26 | 16 | 10 | 0.615 | 125 | 122 |
| August | 30 | 13 | 17 | 0.433 | 170 | 178 |
| September | 27 | 16 | 11 | 0.593 | 162 | 107 |
| Total | 162 | 92 | 70 | 0.568 | 871 | 787 |

| | Games | Won | Lost | Win % | RS | RA |
| Home | 80 | 49 | 31 | 0.613 | 448 | 374 |
| Away | 82 | 43 | 39 | 0.524 | 423 | 413 |
| Total | 162 | 92 | 70 | 0.568 | 871 | 787 |

=== Postseason Game log ===
Legend
| | Yankees win |
| | Yankees loss |
| **Bold** | Yankees team member |

1996 Postseason game log: 11–4 (Home: 3–4; Away: 8–0)
AL Division Series vs. Texas Rangers 3–1 (Home: 1–1; Away: 2–0)

| # | Date | Time (ET) | Opponent | Score | Win | Loss | Save | Time of Game | Attendance | Series | Box/ Streak |

AL Championship Series vs. Baltimore Orioles 4–1 (Home: 1–1; Away: 3–0)

| # | Date | Time (ET) | Opponent | Score | Win | Loss | Save | Time of Game | Attendance | Series | Box/ Streak |
|---|---|---|---|---|---|---|---|---|---|---|---|
| — | October 8 | 8:07 p.m. EDT | Orioles | **Postponed (Rain)** (Makeup date: October 9) | | | | | | | |
| 1 | October 9 | 4:08 p.m. EDT | Orioles | **W** 4–3 (11) | **M Rivera** (1–0) | Myers (0–1) | — | 4:23 | 56,495 | NYA 1–0 | W1 |
| 2 | October 10 | 3:07 p.m. EDT | Orioles | L 3–5 | Wells (1–0) | **Nelson** (0–1) | Benítez (1) | 4:13 | 58,432 | Tied 1–1 | L1 |
| 3 | October 11 | 8:07 p.m. EDT | @ Orioles | **W** 5–2 | **Key** (1–0) | Mussina (0–1) | **Wetteland** (1) | 2:50 | 48,635 | NYA 2–1 | W1 |
| 4 | October 12 | 7:37 p.m. EDT | @ Orioles | **W** 8–4 | **Weathers** (1–0) | Coppinger (0–1) | — | 3:45 | 48,974 | NYA 3–1 | W2 |
| 5 | October 13 | 4:07 p.m. EDT | @ Orioles | **W** 6–4 | **Pettitte** (1–0) | Erickson (0–1) | — | 2:57 | 48,718 | NYA 4–1 | W3 |

World Series: vs. Atlanta Braves 4–2 (Home: 1–2; Away: 3–0)

| # | Date | Time (ET) | Opponent | Score | Win | Loss | Save | Time of Game | Attendance | Series | Box/ Streak |
|---|---|---|---|---|---|---|---|---|---|---|---|
| — | October 19 | 8:01 p.m. EDT | Braves | **Postponed (Rain)** (Makeup date: October 20) | | | | | | | |
| 1 | October 20 | 7:35 p.m. EDT | Braves | L 1–12 | Smoltz (1–0) | **Pettitte** (0–1) | — | 3:10 | 56,365 | ATL 1–0 | L1 |
| 2 | October 21 | 7:15 p.m. EDT | Braves | L 0–4 | Maddux (1–0) | **Key** (0–1) | — | 2:44 | 56,340 | ATL 2–0 | L2 |
| 3 | October 22 | 8:15 p.m. EDT | @ Braves | **W** 5–2 | **Cone** (1–0) | Glavine (0–1) | **Wetteland** (1) | 3:22 | 51,843 | ATL 2–1 | W1 |
| 4 | October 23 | 8:15 p.m. EDT | @ Braves | **W** 8–6 (10) | **Lloyd** (1–0) | Avery (0–1) | **Wetteland** (2) | 4:17 | 51,881 | Tied 2–2 | W2 |
| 5 | October 24 | 8:15 p.m. EDT | @ Braves | **W** 1–0 | **Pettitte** (1–1) | Smoltz (1–1) | **Wetteland** (3) | 2:54 | 51,881 | NYA 3–2 | W3 |
| 6 | October 26 | 8:00 p.m. EDT | Braves | **W** 3–2 | **Key** (1–1) | Maddux (1–1) | **Wetteland** (4) | 2:52 | 56,375 | NYA 4–2 | W4 |

== Player stats ==
| = Indicates team leader |

=== Batting ===
==== Starters by position ====
Note: Pos = Position; G = Games played; AB = At bats; H = Hits; Avg. = Batting average; HR = Home runs; RBI = Runs batted in

| Pos | Player | G | AB | H | Avg. | HR | RBI |
|---|---|---|---|---|---|---|---|
| C | Joe Girardi | 124 | 422 | 124 | .294 | 2 | 45 |
| 1B | Tino Martinez | 155 | 595 | 174 | .292 | 25 | 117 |
| 2B | Mariano Duncan | 109 | 400 | 136 | .340 | 8 | 56 |
| 3B | Wade Boggs | 132 | 501 | 156 | .311 | 2 | 41 |
| SS | Derek Jeter | 157 | 582 | 183 | .314 | 10 | 78 |
| LF | Tim Raines | 59 | 201 | 57 | .284 | 9 | 33 |
| CF | Bernie Williams | 143 | 551 | 168 | .305 | 29 | 102 |
| RF | Paul O'Neill | 150 | 546 | 165 | .302 | 19 | 91 |
| DH | Rubén Sierra | 96 | 360 | 93 | .258 | 11 | 52 |

==== Other batters ====
Note: G = Games played; AB = At bats; H = Hits; Avg. = Batting average; HR = Home runs; RBI = Runs batted in

| Player | G | AB | H | Avg. | HR | RBI |
|---|---|---|---|---|---|---|
| Jim Leyritz | 88 | 265 | 70 | .264 | 7 | 40 |
| Gerald Williams | 99 | 233 | 63 | .270 | 5 | 30 |
| Darryl Strawberry | 63 | 202 | 53 | .262 | 11 | 36 |
| Cecil Fielder | 53 | 200 | 52 | .260 | 13 | 37 |
| Andy Fox | 113 | 189 | 37 | .196 | 3 | 13 |
| Rubén Rivera | 46 | 88 | 25 | .284 | 2 | 16 |
| Mike Aldrete | 32 | 68 | 17 | .250 | 3 | 12 |
| Charlie Hayes | 20 | 67 | 19 | .284 | 2 | 13 |
| Matt Howard | 35 | 54 | 11 | .204 | 1 | 9 |
| Luis Sojo | 18 | 40 | 11 | .275 | 0 | 5 |
| Pat Kelly | 13 | 21 | 3 | .143 | 0 | 2 |
| Robert Eenhoorn | 12 | 14 | 1 | .071 | 0 | 2 |
| Jorge Posada | 8 | 14 | 1 | .071 | 0 | 0 |
| Dion James | 6 | 12 | 2 | .167 | 0 | 0 |
| Tim McIntosh | 3 | 3 | 0 | .000 | 0 | 0 |
| Matt Luke | 1 | 0 | 0 | ---- | 0 | 0 |

=== Pitching ===
| = Indicates league leader |

==== Starting pitchers ====
Note: G = Games pitched; IP = Innings pitched; W = Wins; L = Losses; ERA = Earned run average; SO = Strikeouts

| Player | G | IP | W | L | ERA | SO |
|---|---|---|---|---|---|---|
| Andy Pettitte | 35 | 221.0 | 21 | 8 | 3.87 | 162 |
| Kenny Rogers | 30 | 179.0 | 12 | 8 | 4.68 | 92 |
| Dwight Gooden | 29 | 170.2 | 11 | 7 | 5.01 | 126 |
| Jimmy Key | 30 | 169.1 | 12 | 11 | 4.68 | 116 |
| David Cone | 11 | 72.0 | 7 | 2 | 2.88 | 71 |
| Ramiro Mendoza | 12 | 53.0 | 4 | 5 | 6.79 | 34 |
| Wally Whitehurst | 2 | 8.0 | 1 | 1 | 6.75 | 1 |

==== Other pitchers ====
Note: G = Games pitched; IP = Innings pitched; W = Wins; L = Losses; ERA = Earned run average; SO = Strikeouts

| Player | G | IP | W | L | ERA | SO |
|---|---|---|---|---|---|---|
| Brian Boehringer | 15 | 46.1 | 2 | 4 | 5.44 | 37 |
| Mark Hutton | 12 | 30.1 | 0 | 2 | 5.04 | 25 |
| Scott Kamieniecki | 7 | 22.2 | 1 | 2 | 11.12 | 15 |
| David Weathers | 11 | 17.1 | 0 | 2 | 9.35 | 13 |
| Ricky Bones | 4 | 7.0 | 0 | 0 | 14.14 | 4 |

==== Relief pitchers ====
Note: G = Games pitched; W = Wins; L = Losses; SV = Saves; ERA = Earned run average; SO = Strikeouts

| Player | G | W | L | SV | ERA | SO |
|---|---|---|---|---|---|---|
| John Wetteland | 62 | 2 | 3 | 43 | 2.83 | 69 |
| Jeff Nelson | 73 | 4 | 4 | 2 | 4.36 | 91 |
| Mariano Rivera | 61 | 8 | 3 | 5 | 2.09 | 130 |
| Bob Wickman | 58 | 4 | 1 | 0 | 4.67 | 61 |
| Dale Polley | 32 | 1 | 3 | 0 | 7.89 | 14 |
| Jim Mecir | 26 | 1 | 1 | 0 | 5.13 | 38 |
| Steve Howe | 25 | 0 | 1 | 1 | 6.35 | 5 |
| Dave Pavlas | 16 | 0 | 0 | 1 | 2.35 | 18 |
| Graeme Lloyd | 13 | 0 | 2 | 0 | 17.47 | 6 |
| Billy Brewer | 4 | 1 | 0 | 0 | 9.53 | 8 |
| Paul Gibson | 4 | 0 | 0 | 0 | 6.23 | 3 |
| Mike Aldrete | 1 | 0 | 0 | 0 | 0.00 | 0 |

== ALDS ==
=== Game 1, October 1 ===
Yankee Stadium, The Bronx, New York

| Team | 1 | 2 | 3 | 4 | 5 | 6 | 7 | 8 | 9 | R | H | E |
|---|---|---|---|---|---|---|---|---|---|---|---|---|
| Texas | 0 | 0 | 0 | 5 | 0 | 1 | 0 | 0 | 0 | 6 | 8 | 0 |
| New York | 1 | 0 | 0 | 1 | 0 | 0 | 0 | 0 | 0 | 2 | 10 | 0 |
WP: John Burkett (1–0) LP: David Cone (0–1); Home runs: Tex: Juan González (1), Dean Palmer (1); NYY: None

=== Game 2, October 2 ===
Yankee Stadium, The Bronx, New York

| Team | 1 | 2 | 3 | 4 | 5 | 6 | 7 | 8 | 9 | 10 | 11 | 12 | R | H | E |
|---|---|---|---|---|---|---|---|---|---|---|---|---|---|---|---|
| Texas | 0 | 1 | 3 | 0 | 0 | 0 | 0 | 0 | 0 | 0 | 0 | 0 | 4 | 8 | 1 |
| New York | 0 | 1 | 0 | 1 | 0 | 0 | 1 | 1 | 0 | 0 | 0 | 1 | 5 | 8 | 0 |
WP: Brian Boehringer (1–0) LP: Mike Stanton (0–1); Home runs: Tex: Juan González (2, 3); NYY: Cecil Fielder (1)

=== Game 3, October 4 ===
The Ballpark in Arlington, Arlington, Texas

| Team | 1 | 2 | 3 | 4 | 5 | 6 | 7 | 8 | 9 | R | H | E |
|---|---|---|---|---|---|---|---|---|---|---|---|---|
| New York | 1 | 0 | 0 | 0 | 0 | 0 | 0 | 0 | 2 | 3 | 7 | 1 |
| Texas | 0 | 0 | 0 | 1 | 1 | 0 | 0 | 0 | 0 | 2 | 6 | 1 |
WP: Jeff Nelson (1–0) LP: Darren Oliver (0–1) Sv: John Wetteland (1); Home runs: NYY: Bernie Williams (1); Tex: Juan González (4)

=== Game 4, October 5 ===
The Ballpark in Arlington, Arlington, Texas

| Team | 1 | 2 | 3 | 4 | 5 | 6 | 7 | 8 | 9 | R | H | E |
|---|---|---|---|---|---|---|---|---|---|---|---|---|
| New York | 0 | 0 | 0 | 3 | 1 | 0 | 1 | 0 | 1 | 6 | 12 | 1 |
| Texas | 0 | 2 | 2 | 0 | 0 | 0 | 0 | 0 | 0 | 4 | 9 | 0 |
WP: David Weathers (1–0) LP: Roger Pavlik (0–1) Sv: John Wetteland (2); Home runs: NYY: Bernie Williams (2, 3); Tex: Juan González (5)

== Postseason ==
=== ALCS ===
| Game | Score | Date |
|---|---|---|
| 1 | Baltimore 4, New York 5 | October 9 |
| 2 | Baltimore 5, New York 3 | October 10 |
| 3 | New York 5, Baltimore 2 | October 11 |
| 4 | New York 8, Baltimore 4 | October 12 |
| 5 | New York 6, Baltimore 4 | October 13 |

==== Jeffrey Maier ====
On October 9, 1996, the Yankees trailed the Orioles 4–3 in the bottom of the eighth inning when shortstop Derek Jeter hit a deep fly ball to right field. Right fielder Tony Tarasco moved near the fence and appeared "to draw a bead on the ball" when then-12 year old fan Jeffrey Maier reached over the fence separating the stands and the field of play 9 feet below and deflected the ball into the stands. While baseball fans are permitted to catch (and keep) balls hit into the stands, if "a spectator reaches out of the stands, or goes on the playing field, and touches a live ball" spectator interference is to be called.

=== 1996 World Series ===
==== Game 1 ====
October 20, 1996, at Yankee Stadium in The Bronx, New York

| Team | 1 | 2 | 3 | 4 | 5 | 6 | 7 | 8 | 9 | R | H | E |
|---|---|---|---|---|---|---|---|---|---|---|---|---|
| Atlanta | 0 | 2 | 6 | 0 | 1 | 3 | 0 | 0 | 0 | 12 | 13 | 0 |
| New York | 0 | 0 | 0 | 0 | 1 | 0 | 0 | 0 | 0 | 1 | 4 | 1 |
WP: John Smoltz (1–0) LP: Andy Pettitte (0–1); Home runs: ATL: Andruw Jones 2 (2), Fred McGriff (1); NYY: None

==== Game 2 ====
October 21, 1996, at Yankee Stadium in The Bronx, New York

| Team | 1 | 2 | 3 | 4 | 5 | 6 | 7 | 8 | 9 | R | H | E |
|---|---|---|---|---|---|---|---|---|---|---|---|---|
| Atlanta | 1 | 0 | 1 | 0 | 1 | 1 | 0 | 0 | 0 | 4 | 10 | 0 |
| New York | 0 | 0 | 0 | 0 | 0 | 0 | 0 | 0 | 0 | 0 | 7 | 1 |
WP: Greg Maddux (1–0) LP: Jimmy Key (0–1)

==== Game 3 ====
October 22, 1996, at Atlanta–Fulton County Stadium in Atlanta

| Team | 1 | 2 | 3 | 4 | 5 | 6 | 7 | 8 | 9 | R | H | E |
|---|---|---|---|---|---|---|---|---|---|---|---|---|
| New York | 1 | 0 | 0 | 1 | 0 | 0 | 0 | 3 | 0 | 5 | 8 | 1 |
| Atlanta | 0 | 0 | 0 | 0 | 0 | 1 | 0 | 1 | 0 | 2 | 6 | 1 |
WP: David Cone (1–0) LP: Tom Glavine (0–1) Sv: John Wetteland (1); Home runs: NYY: Bernie Williams (1); ATL: None

==== Game 4 ====
October 23, 1996, at Atlanta–Fulton County Stadium in Atlanta

| Team | 1 | 2 | 3 | 4 | 5 | 6 | 7 | 8 | 9 | 10 | R | H | E |
|---|---|---|---|---|---|---|---|---|---|---|---|---|---|
| New York | 0 | 0 | 0 | 0 | 0 | 3 | 0 | 3 | 0 | 2 | 8 | 12 | 0 |
| Atlanta | 0 | 4 | 1 | 0 | 1 | 0 | 0 | 0 | 0 | 0 | 6 | 9 | 2 |
WP: Graeme Lloyd (1–0) LP: Steve Avery (0–1) Sv: John Wetteland (2); Home runs: NYY: Jim Leyritz (1); ATL: Fred McGriff (2)

==== Game 5 ====
October 24, 1996, at Atlanta–Fulton County Stadium in Atlanta

| Team | 1 | 2 | 3 | 4 | 5 | 6 | 7 | 8 | 9 | R | H | E |
|---|---|---|---|---|---|---|---|---|---|---|---|---|
| New York | 0 | 0 | 0 | 1 | 0 | 0 | 0 | 0 | 0 | 1 | 4 | 1 |
| Atlanta | 0 | 0 | 0 | 0 | 0 | 0 | 0 | 0 | 0 | 0 | 5 | 1 |
WP: Andy Pettitte (1–1) LP: John Smoltz (1–1) Sv: John Wetteland (3)

==== Game 6 ====
October 26, 1996, at Yankee Stadium in The Bronx, New York

| Team | 1 | 2 | 3 | 4 | 5 | 6 | 7 | 8 | 9 | R | H | E |
|---|---|---|---|---|---|---|---|---|---|---|---|---|
| Atlanta | 0 | 0 | 0 | 1 | 0 | 0 | 0 | 0 | 1 | 2 | 8 | 0 |
| New York | 0 | 0 | 3 | 0 | 0 | 0 | 0 | 0 | x | 3 | 8 | 1 |
WP: Jimmy Key (1–1) LP: Greg Maddux (1–1) Sv: John Wetteland (4)

== Awards and honors ==
- 1996 New York Yankees – 1997 Outstanding Team ESPY Award
- Cecil Fielder, Babe Ruth Award
- Derek Jeter, SS, American League Rookie of the Year
- Bernie Williams, ALCS Most Valuable Player
- John Wetteland, World Series Most Valuable Player

=== All-Stars ===
All-Star Game

- Wade Boggs, third base, starter
- Andy Pettitte, pitcher, reserve
- John Wetteland, relief pitcher, reserve

== Farm system ==
| Level | Team | League | Manager |
|---|---|---|---|
| AAA | Columbus Clippers | International League | Stump Merrill |
| AA | Norwich Navigators | Eastern League | Jim Essian |
| A | Tampa Yankees | Florida State League | Trey Hillman |
| A | Greensboro Bats | South Atlantic League | Rick Patterson and Jimmy Johnson |
| A-Short Season | Oneonta Yankees | New York–Penn League | Gary Tuck |
| Rookie | GCL Yankees | Gulf Coast League | Ken Dominguez |

LEAGUE CHAMPIONS: Columbus, GCL Yankees
