= Shad Williams =

American baseball player (born 1971)

- Pitcher
- Born: March 10, 1971 (age 54); Fresno, California, U.S.
- Batted: Right Threw: Right

MLB debut
- May 18, 1996, for the California Angels

Last MLB appearance
- July 22, 1997, for the Anaheim Angels

MLB statistics
- Win–loss record: 0–2
- Earned run average: 8.59
- Strikeouts: 26

CPBL statistics
- Win–loss record: 1–6
- Earned run average: 5.16
- Strikeouts: 29
- Stats at Baseball Reference

Teams
- California/Anaheim Angels (1996–1997); Macoto Gida (2003)

Shad Clayton Williams (born March 10, 1971) is an American former professional baseball pitcher who played for two seasons. He played for the California/Anaheim Angels of Major League Baseball (MLB) for 13 games during the 1996 season and one game during the 1997 season.
