= Bill Lachemann =

American baseball coach (1934–2024)

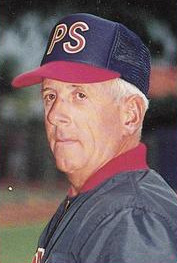
- Lachemann in 1988
- Coach
- Born: April 5, 1934; Los Angeles, California, U.S.
- Died: February 3, 2024 (aged 89); Great Falls, Montana, U.S.
- Batted: Left Threw: Right
- Stats at Baseball Reference

Teams
- California Angels (1995–1996)

William Charles Lachemann (April 5, 1934 – February 3, 2024) was an American professional baseball coach. He coached in Major League Baseball for the California Angels in 1995 and 1996 and also coached in Minor League Baseball.

== Biography ==
Lachemann was the eldest brother of three siblings who have had long careers in the game: Marcel and Rene have been players, managers and coaches in Major League Baseball. He attended Susan Miller Dorsey High School in Crenshaw, Los Angeles and played for Dorsey's baseball team.

Lachemann had a nine-season minor league catching career, interrupted by two years of military service, in the Brooklyn/Los Angeles Dodgers farm system. In his best season, 1960 with the Great Falls Dodgers of the Class C Pioneer League, Lachemann batted .307 and swatted a career-high 10 home runs. During his minor league career, Lachemann hit .253 with 30 homers. He stood 5 ft 9 in (1.75 m) tall, weighed 190 pounds (86 kg), batted left-handed and threw right-handed.

As a manager of Class A, Short Season A and Rookie-level teams in the farm systems of the Angels and San Francisco Giants for 14 seasons, Lachemann's teams compiled a 630–781 (.446) record.

In 1995 and 1996, Bill Lachemann served as bullpen coach on the staff of his brother Marcel, then skipper of the Angels.

Lachemann died on February 3, 2024, at the age of 89.
