= Marcel Lachemann =

American baseball player and manager (born 1941)

- Lachemann in 1969
- Pitcher / Manager
- Born: June 13, 1941 (age 85); Los Angeles, California, U.S.
- Batted: Right Threw: Right

MLB debut
- June 4, 1969, for the Oakland Athletics

Last MLB appearance
- April 25, 1971, for the Oakland Athletics

MLB statistics
- Win–loss record: 7–4
- Earned run average: 3.44
- Strikeouts: 55
- Managerial record: 161–170
- Winning %: .486
- Stats at Baseball Reference

Teams
- As player: Oakland Athletics (1969–1971); As manager: California Angels (1994–1996); As coach: California / Anaheim Angels (1984–1992, 1997–1998); Florida Marlins (1993–1994); Colorado Rockies (2000–2001)

Marcel Ernest Lachemann (born June 13, 1941) is an American professional baseball executive and a former player, manager and pitching coach in Major League Baseball (MLB). As a player, he was a relief pitcher for the Oakland Athletics.

== Playing career ==
Lachemann, along with his brothers Bill and Rene, attended Susan Miller Dorsey High School in Los Angeles, California. After high school, he attended the University of Southern California.

On February 7, 1963, Lachemann signed with the Kansas City Athletics as a free agent. The team later moved to Oakland, where Lachemann made his major league debut on June 4, 1969. He allowed two earned runs in two innings pitched in a 6–1 loss to the Baltimore Orioles. On June 16, Lachemann earned his first career win after tossing three scoreless innings in the first game of a doubleheader against the Kansas City Royals. Later in the day, he also recorded his first career blown save after allowing the tying run in the tenth inning of an eventual 3–2 loss (the run was charged to starting pitcher George Lauzerique). Lachemann ultimately finished the season with a 4–1 record, two saves and a 3.95 earned run average (ERA) in 28 games.

Lachemann had his best major league season in 1970, finishing 3–3 with three saves and a 2.78 ERA in 41 relief appearances. He also recorded 39 strikeouts while walking 18 batters in 58 1/3 innings pitched.

On April 25, 1971, Lachemann made his final MLB appearance (and only appearance of the season), allowing two earned runs in one-third of an inning. His playing career concluded in 1974 with the West Palm Beach Expos, Single-A affiliate of the Montreal Expos.

== Coaching career ==
Lachemann became the pitching coach for the California Angels in 1984. Lachemann stayed with the Angels until the end of the 1992 season, when he was named pitching coach of the newly formed Florida Marlins, joining his younger brother, Rene, who was named Florida's manager.

On May 17, 1994, Lachemann replaced Buck Rodgers as manager of the Angels. His elder brother, Bill, would join him in Anaheim as bullpen coach for the next season. In 1995, the Angels improved markedly and at one point were 13 games ahead of the Seattle Mariners in August, but suffered a historic collapse and lost a one-game playoff in Seattle at the end of the season. The Angels never recovered their winning ways, and on August 7, 1996, Lachemann resigned as manager; his second season was the closest he ever came to reaching the playoffs as a manager. He later returned to Anaheim as the Anaheim Angels' pitching coach under Terry Collins in 1997. At the end of the 1998 season, Lachemann became a minor league field coordinator in the Angels organization.

In the early 2000s, Lachemann served as the Colorado Rockies' pitching coach, and also served in the Rockies' front office as assistant to general manager Dan O'Dowd until the end of the 2011 season.

On November 15, 2011, Lachemann returned to the Angels as a special assistant to general manager Jerry Dipoto.

In January 2023, Lachemann was hired as a special assistant in player development by the Rockies, marking his second stint in the organization.

Lachemann served as pitching coach for Team USA during the 2006 World Baseball Classic and the 2008 Beijing Olympics, and as the bullpen coach for the 2013 World Baseball Classic.

== Managerial record ==
Team	Year	Regular season				
Team	Year	Games	Won	Lost	Win %	Finish
CAL	1994	75	31	44	.413	4th in AL West
CAL	1995	145	78	67	.538	2nd in AL West
CAL	1996	111	52	59	.468	Resigned
Total		331	161	170	.486	

Sporting positions
Preceded by Tom Morgan	California Angels pitching coach 1984–1992	Succeeded by Chuck Hernandez
Preceded by John Wathan	California Angels interim manager 1992	Succeeded by John Wathan
Preceded by Franchise established	Florida Marlins pitching coach 1993–1994	Succeeded by Larry Rothschild
Preceded by Buck Rodgers	California Angels manager 1994–1996	Succeeded by John McNamara
Preceded by Joe Coleman	Anaheim Angels pitching coach 1997–1998	Succeeded by Dick Pole
Preceded by n/a	Anaheim Angels minor league field coordinator 1999	Succeeded by Darrell Miller
Preceded by Milt May	Colorado Rockies pitching coach 2000-2001	Succeeded by Jim Wright
