= Jeff Schmidt (baseball) =

American baseball player (born 1971)

- Pitcher
- Born: February 21, 1971 (age 54); Northfield, Minnesota, U.S.
- Batted: Right Threw: Right

MLB debut
- May 17, 1996, for the California Angels

Last MLB appearance
- June 30, 1996, for the California Angels

MLB statistics
- Win–loss record: 2–0
- Earned run average: 7.88
- Strikeouts: 2
- Stats at Baseball Reference

Teams
- California Angels (1996)

Jeffrey Thomas Schmidt (born February 21, 1971) is an American former professional baseball pitcher who played for one season. He pitched in nine games for the California Angels of Major League Baseball (MLB) during the 1996 season. He was drafted in the first round of the 1992 Major League Baseball draft.
