= Erik Bennett (baseball) =

American baseball player (born 1968)

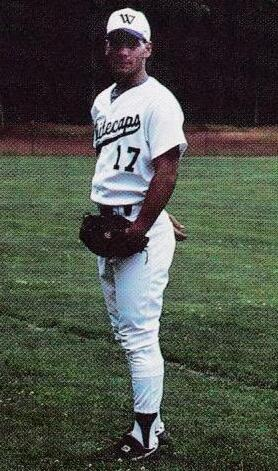
- Bennett with the Brewster Whitecaps in 1988
- Pitcher
- Born: September 13, 1968 (age 57); Yreka, California, U.S.
- Batted: Right Threw: Right

MLB debut
- May 15, 1995, for the California Angels

Last MLB appearance
- June 8, 1996, for the Minnesota Twins

MLB statistics
- Win–loss record: 2–0
- Earned run average: 7.81
- Strikeouts: 13
- Stats at Baseball Reference

Teams
- California Angels (1995); Minnesota Twins (1996)

Erik Hans Bennett (born September 13, 1968) is an American former professional baseball pitched who played two seasons in Major League Baseball (MLB) for the California Angels and Minnesota Twins He is currently the pitching coach for the Salt Lake Bees, the Triple-A affiliate of the Angels.

== Career ==
A native of Yreka, California, Bennett attended Yreka High School and Cal State Sacramento. In 1988, he played collegiate summer baseball with the Brewster Whitecaps of the Cape Cod Baseball League. He was selected by the California Angels in the 4th round of the 1989 Major League Baseball draft.

== See also ==
- List of second generation MLB players
