= Mark Holzemer =

American baseball player (born 1969)

- Pitcher
- Born: August 20, 1969 (age 57); Littleton, Colorado, U.S.
- Batted: Left Threw: Left

Professional debut
- MLB: August 21, 1993, for the California Angels
- NPB: May 3, 2001, for the Yokohama BayStars

Last appearance
- MLB: August 13, 2000, for the Philadelphia Phillies
- NPB: August 17, 2001, for the Yokohama BayStars

MLB statistics
- Win–loss record: 2–5
- Earned run average: 7.69
- Strikeouts: 64

NPB statistics
- Win–loss record: 0–2
- Earned run average: 9.00
- Strikeouts: 10
- Stats at Baseball Reference

Teams
- California Angels (1993, 1995–1996); Seattle Mariners (1997); Oakland Athletics (1998); Philadelphia Phillies (2000); Yokohama BayStars (2001)

Mark Harold Holzemer (born August 20, 1969) is an American former professional baseball pitcher. He played in Major League Baseball (MLB) for the California Angels, Seattle Mariners, Oakland Athletics, and Philadelphia Phillies, and in Nippon Professional Baseball (NPB) for the Yokohama BayStars.

== Career ==
Drafted by the Angels in the fourth round of the 1987 MLB draft out of Mullen High School in Denver Colorado, Holzemer made his MLB debut with California on August 21, 1993 and appeared in his final game on August 13, 2000. In 2001, he played for the BayStars in Japan. Holzemer won two games in the major leagues. On July 23, 1997, he picked up the only save of his MLB career, throwing one pitch to retire the final batter of a 6–3 Mariners victory over the Cleveland Indians.

In September 1995, Holzemer allowed a home run to Cal Ripken Jr. of the Baltimore Orioles on the night Ripken matched Lou Gehrig's consecutive games played streak. In April 1996, Holzemer sparked a bench-clearing brawl after hitting Greg Vaughn of the Milwaukee Brewers with a pitch.

Holzemer elected free agency after the 1996 season and signed with the Mariners. He signed with Oakland after the 1997 season, then was released in March 1999. He spent the rest of that season in the Colorado Rockies minor league system before signing with Philadelphia that November. After pitching in Japan, he returned to Triple-A in 2002.

Holzemer finished his MLB career with a 7.69 earned run average, the fourth-highest by a pitcher with at least 100 innings pitched.

== Personal life ==
Holzemer and his wife, Liz, a meningioma survivor, appeared on an episode of Mystery Diagnosis on the Discovery Health Channel.

Holzemer is a co-owner of Slammers Baseball in Lakewood, Colorado, where he also works as an instructor. He has also worked as an associate scout for the Kansas City Royals. He coached future MLB player Maverick Handley.

While playing for the Angels, Holzemer was the victim of a prank by starting pitcher Chuck Finley, who removed the tires from Holzemer's car and put them in his locker.
