= Ryan Hancock =

American baseball player (born 1971)

- Relief pitcher
- Born: November 11, 1971 (age 54); Santa Clara, California, U.S.
- Batted: Right Threw: Right

MLB debut
- June 8, 1996, for the California Angels

Last MLB appearance
- July 18, 1996, for the California Angels

MLB statistics
- Win–loss record: 4-1
- Earned run average: 7.48
- Strikeouts: 11
- Stats at Baseball Reference

Teams
- California Angels (1996)

Ryan Lee Hancock (born November 11, 1971) is an American former professional baseball pitcher. He played one season in Major League Baseball (MLB) for the California Angels in 1996.

== Career ==
=== California Angels ===
Hancock started playing baseball with Cupertino National Little League in Cupertino, California and was drafted by the California Angels right out of high school but turned it down so he could play both football and baseball for Brigham Young University (BYU). At BYU, he was a third-string quarterback who ended up getting his chance to play after the starter and 2nd string were injuries early on in the season. After he injured his anterior cruciate ligament in the last game of the regular season, Hancock focused solely on baseball.

After his sophomore year, Hancock was drafted by the Angels once again. Hancock played in the Minor leagues until his first Major League game on June 8, 1996. The next day, he became one of two American League pitchers to get a hit during the 1996 season. The other AL pitcher to get a hit that year was Roger Clemens on May 23.

=== San Diego Padres ===
On August 13, 1997, the Angels traded Hancock, Stevenson Agosto, and a player to be named later to the San Diego Padres in exchange for Rickey Henderson. The Padres acquired George Arias to complete the trade.
