= Bruce Hines =

American baseball coach (born 1957)

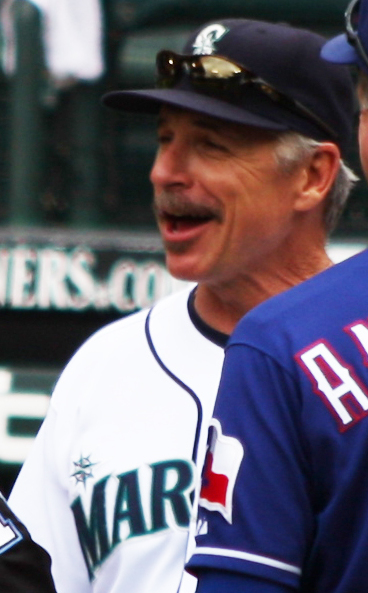
- Hines with the Seattle Mariners in 2009
- First base coach
- Born: November 7, 1957 (age 68); Pomona, California, U.S.
- Bats: Switch Throws: Right

Teams
- As coach: California Angels (1991); Seattle Mariners (2009); Los Angeles Angels (2021)

Bruce Edwin Hines (born November 7, 1957) is an American former professional baseball coach and former minor league player.

== Career ==
As a player, Hines was a switch hitter who primarily played second base. He attended Bonita High School in La Verne, California, and played college baseball for the University of La Verne. He was drafted by the Milwaukee Brewers in the 15th round of the 1979 amateur draft, but returned to La Verne where he was named First Team All-SCIAC in 1980. He was drafted by the San Diego Padres in the 18th round of the 1980 amateur draft, but his playing career peaked at the high-A level.

He managed teams in the California/Anaheim/Los Angeles Angels and Oakland Athletics minor league systems, and worked as minor-league field coordinator for the Angels before being named the third base coach for the Seattle Mariners.

On October 19, 2009, the Mariners announced Hines would be the only member of their coaching staff not retained for the following season. He then spent a few years as the Dodgers' minor league field coordinator.

On January 11, 2021, Hines returned to the Los Angeles Angels as their first base and outfield coach. On November 8, 2021, the Angels announced that Hines would not be returning for the 2022 season.

== Off the field ==
Hines had a brief appearance in the 1996 film The Fan, in which he played an umpire who was presumably killed by the film's lead character.
