= Chris Turner (baseball) =

American baseball player (born 1969)

- Catcher
- Born: March 23, 1969 (age 57); Bowling Green, Kentucky, U.S.
- Batted: Right Threw: Right

MLB debut
- August 27, 1993, for the California Angels

Last MLB appearance
- October 1, 2000, for the New York Yankees

MLB statistics
- Batting average: .237
- Home runs: 4
- Runs batted in: 36
- Stats at Baseball Reference

Teams
- California Angels (1993–1997); Kansas City Royals (1998); Cleveland Indians (1999); New York Yankees (2000)

Career highlights and awards
- World Series champion (2000)

Christopher Wan Turner (born March 23, 1969) is an American former professional baseball catcher. He previously played in Major League Baseball (MLB) for the California Angels, Kansas City Royals, Cleveland Indians, and New York Yankees between 1993 and 2000. While serving primarily as a backup catcher, he also played some first base, right field, left field, and saw time as a designated hitter. He was a member of the Yankees' 2000 World Series championship team.

== Amateur career ==
A native of Bowling Green, Kentucky, Turner attended Western Kentucky University. In 1989 and 1990, he played collegiate summer baseball in the Cape Cod Baseball League for the Yarmouth-Dennis Red Sox.

== Professional career ==
=== California Angels/Anaheim Angels (1993–1997) ===
Drafted by the California Angels in the 7th round of the 1991 MLB amateur draft, Turner would make his MLB debut with them on August 27, 1993. He played in 25 games that year as a backup catcher and hit .280 with one home run and 13 runs batted in, his best season. In 1994, he played in a career-high 58 games and hit .242 with one home run and 12 runs batted in before the MLB strike cancelled the remainder of the season in August. In 1995 he played in just five games, going 1-for-10 with an RBI. The next season, he played in four games, going 1 for 5 with an RBI and a walk. In 1997, he played in 13 games, going 6-for-23 with a homer and two runs batted in. On October 10, 1997, he was granted free agency. He signed with the Minnesota Twins on December 5, 1997, but was released on April 20, 1998.

=== Kansas City Royals (1998) ===
Turner signed with the Kansas City Royals on April 20, 1998, only hours after being released by the Twins. He played in four games for the Royals and went 0-for-9 with four strikeouts. He was granted free agency on October 15.

=== Cleveland Indians (1999) ===
Turner signed with the Cleveland Indians on January 5, 1999. He played in just 12 games, going 4-for-21 with three runs, a steal, and a walk while recording eight strikeouts. On October 4, he was granted free agency.

=== New York Yankees (2000) ===
Turner signed with the New York Yankees on December 17, 1999, and was viewed as a temporary successor to Joe Girardi, who left as a free agent. He played in 37 games, his highest total since 1994 and the second highest of his career. Turner appeared in his final game on October 1, 2000, with the Yankees and received a World Series ring when they defeated the New York Mets in the Subway Series.

=== Retirement ===
Turner was granted free agency on November 21, 2000. On January 4, 2001, he signed with the Philadelphia Phillies but was released before the start of the season and subsequently retired.
