= Rich Monteleone =

American baseball player (born 1963)

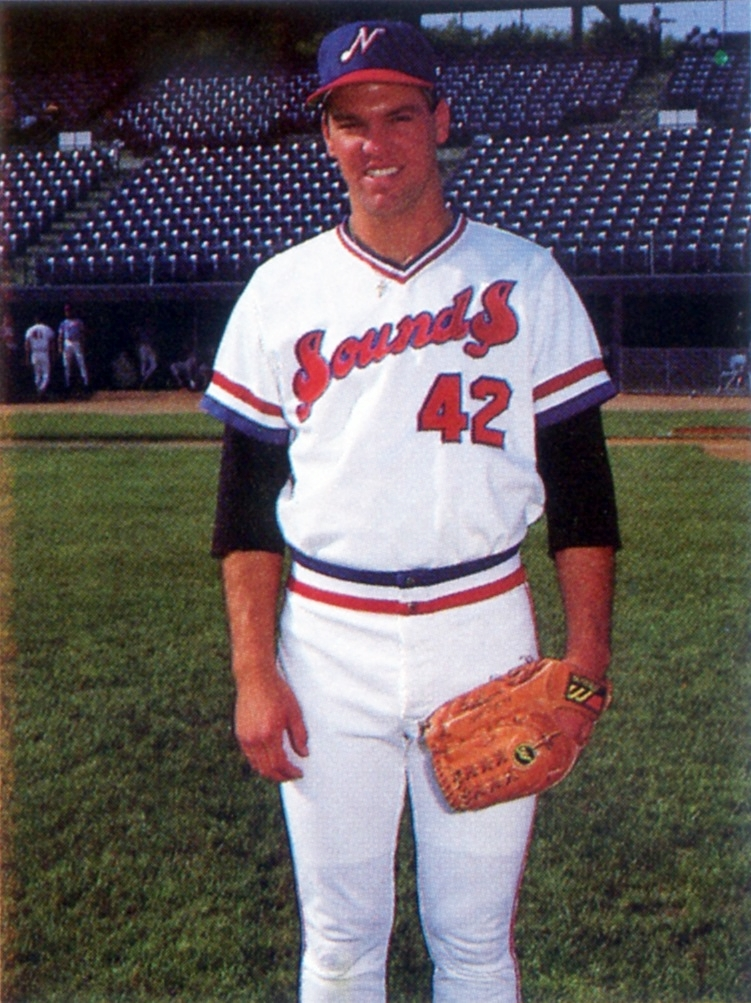
- Monteleone with the Nashville Sounds in 1985
- Pitcher
- Born: March 22, 1963 (age 63); Tampa, Florida, U.S.
- Batted: Right Threw: Right

Professional debut
- MLB: April 15, 1987, for the Seattle Mariners
- NPB: April 11, 1995, for the Chunichi Dragons

Last appearance
- NPB: July 14, 1995, for the Chunichi Dragons
- MLB: July 11, 1996, for the California Angels

MLB statistics
- Win–loss record: 24–17
- Earned run average: 3.87
- Strikeouts: 212

NPB statistics
- Win–loss record: 2–4
- Earned run average: 6.55
- Strikeouts: 19
- Stats at Baseball Reference

Teams
- Seattle Mariners (1987); California Angels (1988–1989); New York Yankees (1990–1993); San Francisco Giants (1994); Chunichi Dragons (1995); California Angels (1995–1996)

Richard Monteleone (born March 22, 1963) is an American former professional baseball pitcher and coach.

== Career ==
Monteleone was the first round pick (20th overall) for the Detroit Tigers in the 1982 draft. However, he began his major league career with the Seattle Mariners in 1987. After a year in Seattle, Monteleone pitched relief for the California Angels from 1988 to 1989, the New York Yankees from 1990 to 1993, the San Francisco Giants in 1994, and the Angels again from 1995 to 1996. In 1995, he started the season in Nippon Professional Baseball (NPB) with the Chunichi Dragons before returning to the Angels.

After his last season as a player in 1996, Monteleone became a coach for the Yankees. While he was most recently with the big league team, Monteleone has also coached Yankees' minor league teams during his tenure. From 2002 to 2004, Monteleone served as the bullpen coach for the Yankees, and was a special pitching instructor for the team from 2005 to 2008. He was fired by the team after the 2008 season.

== Personal life ==
Monteleone and his wife Loretta have two daughters, Chelsea Rhae and Alexis Blake.

Monteleone currently lives in Florida.
