= Mike Aldrete =

American baseball player and coach (born 1961)

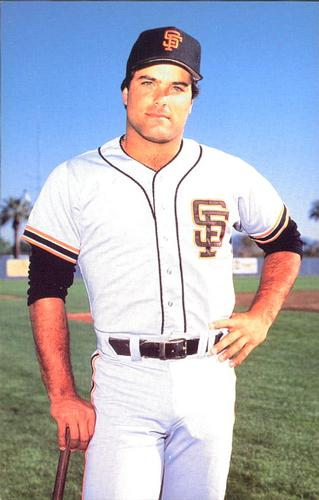
- Aldrete with the San Francisco Giants

Athletics – No. 18
- First baseman / Outfielder / First base coach
- Born: January 29, 1961 (age 65); Carmel, California
- Batted: Left Threw: Left

MLB debut
- May 29, 1986, for the San Francisco Giants

Last MLB appearance
- September 29, 1996, for the New York Yankees

MLB statistics
- Batting average: .263
- Home runs: 41
- Runs batted in: 271
- Stats at Baseball Reference

Teams
- As player: San Francisco Giants (1986–1988); Montreal Expos (1989–1990); San Diego Padres (1991); Cleveland Indians (1991); Oakland Athletics (1993–1995); California Angels (1995–1996); New York Yankees (1996); As coach: Seattle Mariners (2004); Arizona Diamondbacks (2005–2006); St. Louis Cardinals (2008–2014); Oakland Athletics / Athletics (2015–present)

Career highlights and awards
- World Series champion (1996)

Michael Peter Aldrete (born January 29, 1961) is an American former professional baseball first baseman/outfielder and current hitting coach for the Athletics of Major League Baseball (MLB). He played for 7 teams over a span of ten seasons, including the Athletics, San Francisco Giants, Montreal Expos, San Diego Padres, Cleveland Indians, California Angels, and New York Yankees from 1986 to 1996.

== Playing career ==
Aldrete was a four-year letterman at Stanford University, where he received a Bachelor of Arts Degree in Communication. He is a member of Delta Tau Delta International Fraternity. From 1986 through 1996, Aldrete played for the San Francisco Giants (1986–88), Montreal Expos (1989–90), San Diego Padres (1991), Cleveland Indians (1991), Oakland Athletics (1993–95), California Angels (1995–96) and New York Yankees (1996). He batted and threw left-handed.

Aldrete's best season was 1987 when he hit .325 with 51 runs batted in (RBI), 50 runs, 116 hits and 18 doubles, all career-highs.

Aldrete's teams made the playoffs twice. The Giants reached the 1987 National League Championship Series and he was a member of the 1996 World Series champion Yankees as they beat the Atlanta Braves.

In 930 games over 10 seasons, Aldrete posted a .263 batting average (565-for-2147) with 277 runs, 41 home runs, 271 RBI and 314 bases on balls. Defensively, he recorded a .993 fielding percentage playing primarily at first base and all three outfield positions.

== Coaching career ==
Since 2001, Aldrete has maintained a role in professional baseball as a coach. After three years in the minors in the Arizona Diamondbacks system, he has been a first base coach for the Seattle Mariners (2004) and served as the hitting coach for the Diamondbacks (2005–06). Aldrete served as assistant hitting coach for the St. Louis Cardinals beginning in 2008 and was the bench coach for the Cardinals from 2011 to 2014.

Aldrete became the Athletics' bench coach in 2015. Following the season, he became the team's first base coach. He served as a quality control coach in 2022 before returning to the first base coach role for the 2023 season. He became a hitting coach in 2024.

== See also ==
- List of St. Louis Cardinals coaches

Sporting positions
Preceded by Position created	St. Louis Cardinals assistant hitting coach 2008–2011	Succeeded by John Mabry
Preceded by Joe Pettini	St. Louis Cardinals bench coach 2012–2014	Succeeded by David Bell
Preceded by Chip Hale	Oakland Athletics bench coach 2015	Succeeded by Mark Kotsay
Preceded by Tye Waller; Al Pedrique	Oakland Athletics first base coach 2016–2017; 2020–present	Succeeded by Al Pedrique; Incumbent
Preceded by Marcus Jensen	Oakland Athletics assistant hitting coach 2018–2019	Succeeded by Eric Martins
