= Orlando Palmeiro =

American baseball player (born 1969)

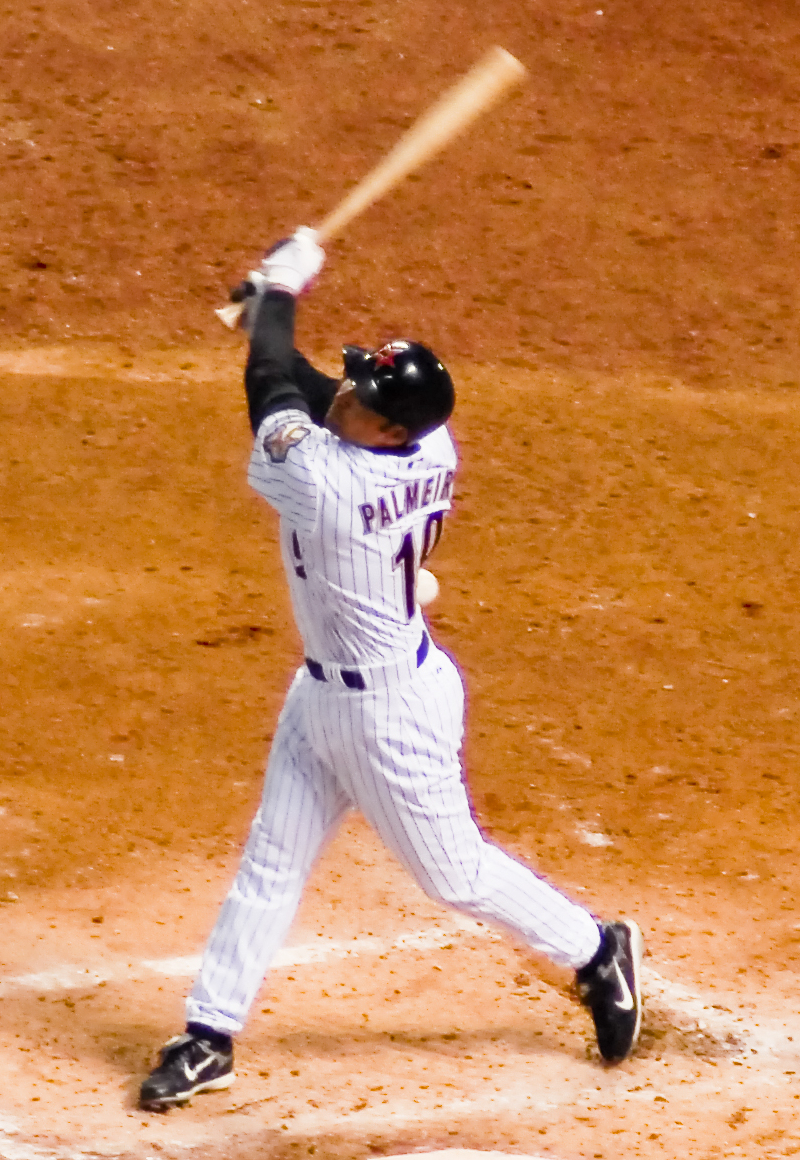
- Outfielder
- Born: January 19, 1969 (age 57); Hoboken, New Jersey, U.S.
- Batted: Left Threw: Left

MLB debut
- July 1, 1995, for the California Angels

Last MLB appearance
- September 30, 2007, for the Houston Astros

MLB statistics
- Batting average: .274
- Home runs: 12
- Runs batted in: 226
- Stats at Baseball Reference

Teams
- California / Anaheim Angels (1995–2002); St. Louis Cardinals (2003); Houston Astros (2004–2007)

Career highlights and awards
- World Series champion (2002)

Orlando Palmeiro (born January 19, 1969) is an American former Major League Baseball outfielder. He attended high school at Miami Southridge High School and played college baseball at the University of Miami.

Palmeiro, a star high school player in Miami, Florida, went on to play baseball at the community college level at Miami-Dade Community College South and then briefly at the University of Miami under UM coach Ron Fraser before being drafted by the California Angels where he played for a number of years on various farm teams before reaching the majors.

Palmeiro spent his entire career as a backup outfielder, never having been a regular starter. He was the fourth outfielder of the 2002 World Series Champion Anaheim Angels team, batting .300 for the year. Palmeiro also made the last out of the 2005 World Series for the Houston Astros. His best season was arguably with the St. Louis Cardinals in 2003, when he batted .271 with 3 home runs and 33 RBI. During his career, he amassed 120 pinch hits, ninth on the all-time list. He is the cousin of Rafael Palmeiro.

== See also ==
- List of Cuban Americans
