= Ken Edenfield =

American baseball player (born 1967)

- Relief pitcher
- Born: March 18, 1967 (age 58); Jesup, Georgia, U.S.
- Batted: Right Threw: Right

MLB debut
- May 11, 1995, for the California Angels

Last MLB appearance
- April 6, 1996, for the California Angels

MLB statistics
- Win–loss record: 0–0
- Earned run average: 5.82
- Strikeouts: 10
- Stats at Baseball Reference

Teams
- California Angels (1995–1996)

Kenneth Edward Edenfield (born March 18, 1967) is an American former professional baseball player who played two seasons for the California Angels of Major League Baseball (MLB).
