= Sherbrooke Pirates =

- 1972–1973; Sherbrooke, Quebec

Minor league affiliations
- Class: Double-A (1972–1973)
- League: Eastern League (1972–1973)

Major league affiliations
- Team: Pittsburgh Pirates (1972–1973)

Team data
- Ballpark: le Stade Amedée-Roy (1972–1973)

The Sherbrooke Pirates (French: les Pirates de Sherbrooke) was the name of a Canadian minor league baseball franchise in the Double-A Eastern League representing Sherbrooke, Québec, that existed from 1972–73. Affiliated with the namesake Pittsburgh Pirates of Major League Baseball, the Sherbrooke club played at le Stade Amedée-Roy.

== On-field success during two-year stay ==
The Eastern League's expansion into Québec in 1971, with the Trois-Rivières Aigles and the Québec Carnavals, was initially very successful. The 1971 Waterbury Pirates had drawn more than 64,000 fans — fifth in the eight-team league — and moved to Sherbrooke for 1972. Although the 1972 Pirates posted a winning record in their maiden year in Sherbrooke, they did not make the playoffs and attendance lagged far behind that of the other two Québec teams at 66,100. The following season brought another winning (but non-playoff) team and a six percent increase in attendance, but at season's end the team moved to Thetford Mines, located 104 km (65 miles) to the north, to become the Thetford Mines Pirates.

== Notable alumni ==
- Tony Armas
- Ken Macha
- Mario Mendoza
- Kent Tekulve

== Season-by-season ==
Year	Record	Finish Full Season	Attendance	Manager	Postseason
1972	77–63	Second (National Div.)	66,101	Steve Demeter	
1973	76–63	Second (National Div.)	70,457	Tim Murtaugh	

== See also ==
- Amedée Roy Stadium

Preceded by Waterbury Pirates	Pittsburgh Pirates; Double-A affiliate 1972–1973	Succeeded by Thetford Mines Pirates
