= Thetford Mines Pirates =

- 1974–1975; Thetford Mines, Quebec

Minor league affiliations
- Class: Double-A
- League: Eastern League

Major league affiliations
- Team: Pittsburgh Pirates (1974); Milwaukee Brewers (1975)

Minor league titles
- League titles (1): 1974

Team data
- Name: Thetford Mines Pirates (1974); Thetford Mines Miners (1975)
- Ballpark: le Stade Bellevue

The Thetford Mines Pirates and the Thetford Mines Miners (French: les Pirates (Mineurs) de Thetford Mines) were the names of a Canadian minor league baseball franchise that represented Thetford Mines, Quebec, in the Double-A Eastern League in 1974–75. The club played at le Stade Bellevue.

After two winning but non-playoff teams as the Sherbrooke Pirates, the team moved to Thetford Mines, located 104 km (65 miles) to the north, for the 1974 season as an affiliate of the namesake Pittsburgh Pirates of Major League Baseball. Led by league All-Star catcher and Most Valuable Player Ken Macha, the future MLB manager, Thetford Mines made the playoffs and defeated the Bristol Red Sox in the semi-finals and the Pittsfield Rangers in the finals to win the Eastern League championship. But the club drew almost 50,000 fans less than they had in Sherbrooke during the 1973 season. As a result, the MLB Pirates switched their Double-A affiliate to the Shreveport Captains of the Double-A Texas League for 1975.

They were replaced in Thetford Mines by the Milwaukee Brewers for 1975. But the renamed "Miners" finished in seventh place, 22½ games out of a playoff spot, and drew only 16,000 fans all year. The franchise was moved to Williamsport, Pennsylvania, for 1976.

== Season-by-season ==
Year	Record	Finish	Attendance	Manager	Playoffs
1974	75–65	Second (National Div.)	22,516	Tim Murtaugh	Won Semi-Finals vs. Bristol Red Sox, 2-0; Won Championship vs. Pittsfield Rangers, 2-0
1975	59–80	Seventh	16,360	John Felske	

== Notable alumni ==
- Tony Armas
- Jim Gantner
- Mike Jackson
- Ken Macha
- Omar Moreno
- Willie Randolph
- Craig Reynolds
- Lenn Sakata

Preceded by Sherbrooke Pirates	Pittsburgh Pirates; Double-A affiliate 1974	Succeeded by Shreveport Captains
Preceded by Shreveport Captains	Milwaukee Brewers; Double-A affiliate 1975	Succeeded by Berkshire Brewers
