= Salem RidgeYaks =

- Founded in 1955; Salem, Virginia

Team logo	Cap insignia

Minor league affiliations
- Class: Single-A (2021–present)
- Previous classes: Class A-Advanced (1990–2020); Class A (1968–1989); Rookie (1963–1967); Class D (1955, 1957–1962)
- League: Carolina League (1968–present)
- Division: North Division
- Previous leagues: Appalachian League (1955, 1957–1967)

Major league affiliations
- Team: Boston Red Sox (2009–present)
- Previous teams: Houston Astros (2003–2008); Colorado Rockies (1995–2002); Pittsburgh Pirates (1987–1994); Texas Rangers (1984–1986); San Diego Padres (1981–1983); Pittsburgh Pirates (1964–1980); San Francisco Giants (1960–1963); Pittsburgh Pirates (1955, 1957–1959)

Minor league titles
- League titles (7): 1955; 1965; 1972; 1974; 1987; 2001; 2013
- Division titles (13): 1968; 1969; 1972; 1974; 1981; 1987; 1988; 2006; 2009; 2013; 2016; 2019; 2021

Team data
- Name: Salem RidgeYaks (2026–present)
- Previous names: Salem Red Sox (2009–2025); Salem Avalanche (1995–2008); Salem Buccaneers (1987–1994); Salem Redbirds (1980–1986); Salem Pirates (1972–1979); Salem Rebels (1955, 1957–1971)
- Colors: Navy blue, light blue, tan, white
- Mascots: Mac and Mugsy
- Ballpark: Salem Memorial Ballpark (1995–present)
- Previous parks: Kiwanis Field (1955, 1957–1994)
- Owner/ Operator: Diamond Baseball Holdings
- General manager: Allen Lawrence
- Manager: Ozzie Chavez
- Website: milb.com/salem

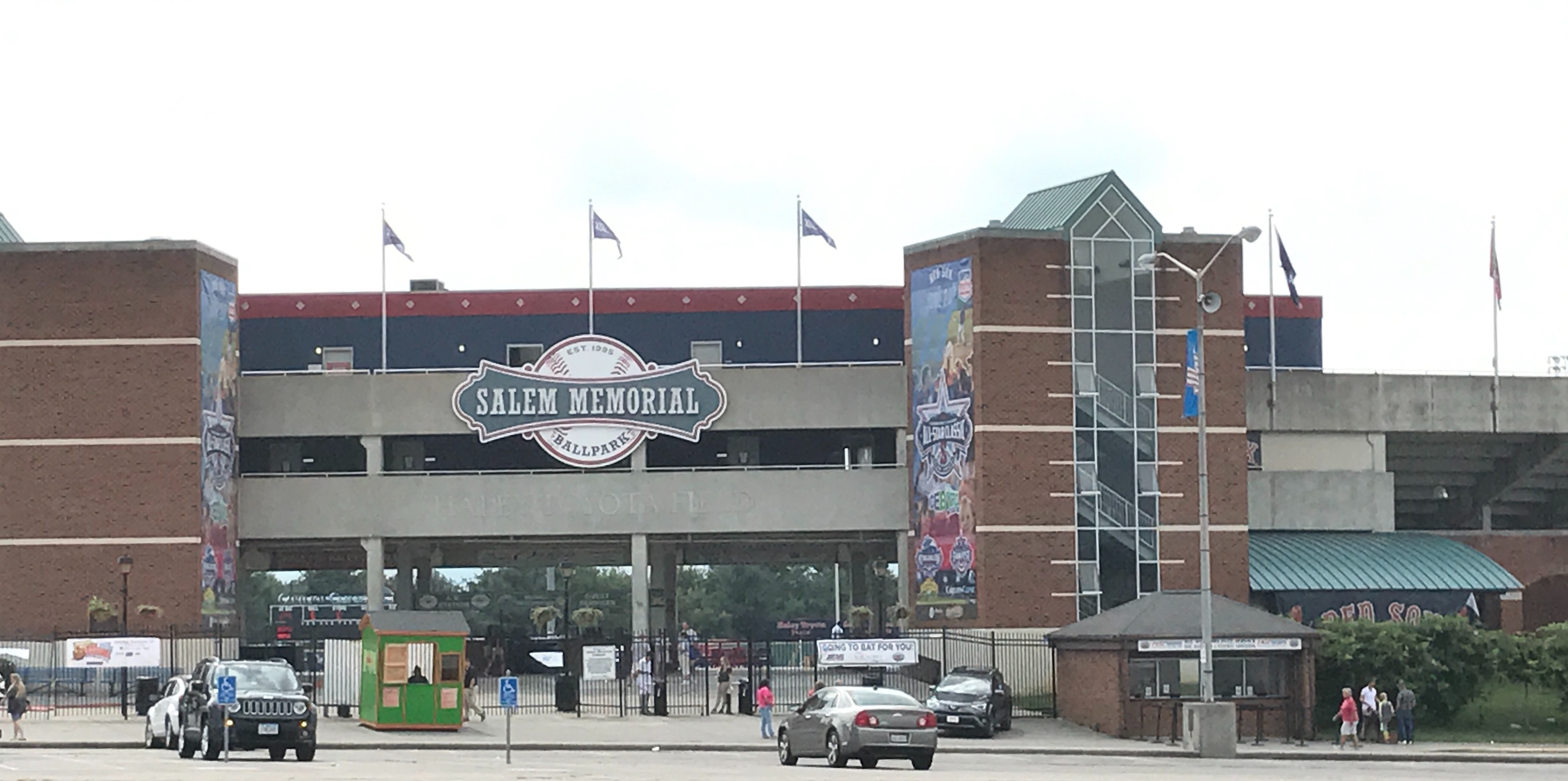
Exterior of Salem Memorial Ballpark in 2017

The Salem RidgeYaks are a Minor League Baseball affiliate of the Boston Red Sox of Major League Baseball (MLB), based in Salem, an independent city adjacent to Roanoke, Virginia. (Note: Salem is 677 miles (1,090 km) from Fenway Park in Boston.) The team competes at the Single-A level in the Carolina League. Home games are played at Carilion Clinic Field at Salem Memorial Ballpark, a 6,300-seat facility opened in 1995.

The team first played in 1955, and then from 1957 to 1967, in the Appalachian League, initially at the now-defunct Class D level, and then at the Rookie level starting in 1963. From 1968 through 2020, the team competed in the Carolina League, initially Class A and then Class A-Advanced starting in 1990.

The team was known as the Salem Avalanche from 1995 through 2008, when it was affiliated with the Colorado Rockies (1995–2002) and Houston Astros (2003–2008). Prior to 1995, the franchise played under several other names and affiliations. In 2009, the team rebranded as the Salem Red Sox before adopting the RidgeYaks identity for 2026.

== History ==
The franchise debuted in 1955 and was initially known as the Salem Rebels, an affiliate of the Pittsburgh Pirates.

The franchise was owned from 1986 until 2006 by Kelvin Bowles, a cable television executive and scout in Major League Baseball. Bowles, who scouted for the Boston Red Sox from 2002 to 2005, bought the team when it was in danger of moving from Salem. In 2006, the team was sold to Hardball Capital from Atlanta who also owned the Fort Wayne Wizards. In December 2007, this group sold the team to Fenway Sports Group, a subsidiary of the Boston Red Sox ownership group, preparing the team for an affiliation change after its Player Development Contract with the Houston Astros ended in 2008. As such, the Salem Red Sox were owned (until 2023) by the same parent company that manages Liverpool F.C. and the Boston Red Sox.

In 2006, Salem Memorial Ballpark hosted the All Star Game between the Carolina League and California League.

Since switching affiliation to Boston in 2009, the team has claimed four division titles (2009, 2013, 2016, 2019), has made five playoff appearances (each division title season, plus 2014 as a wild card), and has won one league championship (2013). League and divisional titles are commemorated on the press box and sky boxes overlooking the Carilion Clinic Field Grandstand.

In conjunction with Major League Baseball's restructuring of Minor League Baseball in 2021, the team moved from being the Red Sox' Class A-Advanced affiliate to being their Low-A affiliate, and became a member of the Low-A East; in a corresponding move, the Greenville Drive moved from Class A to High-A. At the time of the restructuring, the website Ballpark Digest speculated that the Red Sox could look to move the Salem franchise to Lowell, Massachusetts in time for the 2022 season. In May 2021, Rick White, president of the Atlantic League of Professional Baseball, announced that Salem, along with Staten Island, New York, was "on board for 2022" as an expansion franchise location, further fueling speculation that Salem would lose their affiliation status to Lowell. In 2022, the Low-A East became known as the Carolina League, the name historically used by the regional circuit prior to the 2021 reorganization, and was reclassified as a Single-A circuit.

On March 17, 2023, it was announced that their owners, FSG, sold them to Diamond Baseball Holdings who also own the Red Sox Double-A affiliate, the Portland Sea Dogs.

=== Location and rivalry games ===
While the team is located in a relatively small city (population circa 25,000) when compared to other teams of its classification, the Red Sox are strongly identified with the Roanoke Valley as a whole, drawing fans from neighboring cities and counties within the roughly 300,000-person metropolitan area. The connection with neighboring Roanoke was emphasized during the 2017 Carolina League All-Star Classic, hosted by Salem, that was represented by a logo featuring the iconic Mill Mountain Star. Salem is also located in the Blue Ridge Mountains, which are featured prominently on the team's logo and are clearly visible over Carilion Clinic Field's outfield walls. This mountain view includes the aforementioned star, visible on clear nights over the left field wall.

Carilion Clinic Field at Salem Memorial Ballpark is located roughly 2 miles (3.2 km) from downtown Salem and is part of the James E. Taliaferro Sports and Entertainment Complex, which also includes the Salem Civic Center and Salem Football Stadium (former location of the annual Stagg Bowl). The Red Sox share their stadium with the NCAA Division III Roanoke Maroons and have previously hosted the "Hokie-Smokey Classic" baseball series between the Tennessee Volunteers and the nearby Virginia Tech Hokies.

Given the teams' close proximity, their long-time histories in the league, and both competing in the Carolina League's North Division, Salem's chief rival is the Hill City Howlers. The regular matchups of these teams, known as the "460 Series", named for U.S. Route 460 which connects the cities, has occasionally feature day/night doubleheaders during which two games will be split between the two cities over the course of the same day.

== Season-by-season records ==
Salem has competed in two different leagues and at four different classification levels:

- Appalachian League (1955, 1957–1967)
  - Class D (1955, 1957–1962)
  - Rookie (1963–1967)
- Carolina League (1968–2020)
  - Class A (1968–1989)
  - Class A-Advanced (1990–2020)
  - Class A (2021–present)

Key
Division title
League champions

Note that while records in the below table are for entire seasons, the Carolina League has played a split-season schedule since 1970, except for 2020, when minor-league seasons were canceled, and 2021, when it operated as Low-A East. In years when a split-season was played, a team may have earned a division title by finishing first in either half of the season, despite not having the best overall record for the entire season. Alternately, a team may have had the best overall record for the entire season, but did not finish first in either half of the season, thus did not earn a division title.

Season	Nickname	Affiliation	Record (win %)	Finish	Manager	Playoffs (games)	Attendance	Ref.
1955	Rebels	Pittsburgh	84–38 (.689)	1st of 8	Jack Crosswhite	defeated Kingsport Cherokees (2–0) no contest vs. Johnson City Cardinals (Note: In 1955, Salem and the Johnson City Cardinals were declared league co-champions when the final playoff series was canceled due to rain.)	31,213	
1956	no team		—	—	—	—		
1957	Rebels	Pittsburgh	38–30 (.559)	3rd of 6	Lamar Dorton	none held	18,007	
1958	Rebels	Pittsburgh	42–29 (.592)	3rd of 6	Lamar Dorton	none held	21,351	
1959	Rebels	Pittsburgh	38–29 (.567)	2nd of 6	Lamar Dorton	none held	36,128	
1960	Rebels	San Francisco	28–39 (.418)	6th of 6	Jodie Phipps	none held	38,929	
1961	Rebels	San Francisco	31–35 (.470)	7th of 8	Jodie Phipps	none held	34,125	
1962	Rebels	San Francisco	31–39 (.443)	5th of 6	Alex Cosmidis	none held	40,913	
1963	Rebels	San Francisco	36–34 (.514)	2nd of 6	Alex Cosmidis	none held	34,061	
1964	Rebels	Pittsburgh	30–41 (.423)	3rd of 4	George Detore	none held	36,184	
1965	Rebels	Pittsburgh	43–27 (.614)	1st of 6	George Detore	(champions, no playoff)	44,254	
1966	Rebels	Pittsburgh	25–43 (.368)	5th of 5	George Detore	none held	34,884	
1967	Rebels	Pittsburgh	28–38 (.424)	5th of 6	Bob Pritchard	none held	34,822	
1968	Rebels	Pittsburgh	85–55 (.607)	1st of 6 (West)	Don Hoak	lost to Lynchburg White Sox (0–1)	64,532	
1969	Rebels	Pittsburgh	78–66 (.542)	1st of 5 (West)	Chuck Hiller	defeated High Point-Thomasville Royals (2–0) lost to Burlington Senators (0–2)	63,248	
1970	Rebels	Pittsburgh	60–80 (.429)	7th of 8	Billy Klaus	did not qualify	50,076	
1971	Rebels	Pittsburgh	65–71 (.478)	6th of 8	Tim Murtaugh	did not qualify	37,872	
1972	Pirates	Pittsburgh	79–58 (.577)	1st of 6 (Note: In 1972, Salem finished first in the 2nd half of the split-season.)	Tim Murtaugh	defeated Burlington Rangers (2–1)	43,910	
1973	Pirates	Pittsburgh	66–72 (.478)	5th of 6	Steve Demeter	did not qualify	45,915	
1974	Pirates	Pittsburgh	87–50 (.635)	1st of 6 (Note: In 1974, Salem finished first in both halves of the split-season.)	Johnny Lipon	(champions, no playoff)	41,379	
1975	Pirates	Pittsburgh	74–66 (.529)	3rd of 4	Johnny Lipon	did not qualify	39,007	
1976	Pirates	Pittsburgh	68–69 (.496)	3rd of 4	Steve Demeter	did not qualify	30,387	
1977	Pirates	Pittsburgh	66–72 (.478)	3rd of 4	Steve Demeter	did not qualify	32,744	
1978	Pirates	Pittsburgh	72–63 (.533)	3rd of 6	Jim Mahoney	did not qualify	51,096	
1979	Pirates	Pittsburgh	54–82 (.397)	6th of 6	Jim Mahoney	did not qualify	43,036	
1980	Redbirds	Pittsburgh	79–60 (.568)	2nd of 4 (Virginia)	Johnny Lipon	did not qualify	102,456	
1981	Redbirds	San Diego	66–74 (.471)	3rd of 4 (North) (Note: In 1981, Salem finished first in the 2nd half of the split-season.)	Glenn Ezell	lost to Hagerstown Suns (0–1)	72,125	
1982	Redbirds	San Diego	39–101 (.279)	4th of 4 (North)	Jim Zerilla	did not qualify	47,202	
1983	Redbirds	San Diego	50–89 (.360)	4th of 4 (North)	Steve Smith	did not qualify	56,451	
1984	Redbirds	Texas	64–74 (.464)	3rd of 4 (North)	Bill Stearns	did not qualify	61,623	
1985	Redbirds	Texas	72–65 (.526)	2nd of 4 (North)	Bill Stearns	did not qualify	71,788	
1986	Redbirds	Texas	45–93 (.326)	4th of 4 (North)	Mike Bucci	did not qualify	87,047	
1987	Buccaneers	Pittsburgh	80–59 (.576)	1st of 4 (North) (Note: In 1987, Salem finished first in the 2nd half of the split-season.)	Steve Demeter	defeated Hagerstown Suns (2–0) defeated Kinston Indians (3–1)	111,661	
1988	Buccaneers	Pittsburgh	73–66 (.525)	2nd of 4 (North) (Note: In 1988, Salem finished first in the 1st half of the split-season.)	Jay Ward	lost to Lynchburg Red Sox (1–2)	119,966	
1989	Buccaneers	Pittsburgh	63–75 (.457)	4th of 4 (North)	Rocky Bridges	did not qualify	121,581	
1990	Buccaneers	Pittsburgh	55–84 (.396)	4th of 4 (North)	Stan Cliburn	did not qualify	126,121	
1991	Buccaneers	Pittsburgh	63–77 (.450)	3rd of 4 (North)	Stan Cliburn	did not qualify	131,582	
1992	Buccaneers	Pittsburgh	64–76 (.457)	4th of 4 (North)	John Wockenfuss	did not qualify	159,316	
1993	Buccaneers	Pittsburgh	61–79 (.436)	4th of 4 (South)	Scott Little	did not qualify	145,657	
1994	Buccaneers	Pittsburgh	64–75 (.460)	3rd of 4 (South)	Trent Jewett	did not qualify	153,575	
1995	Avalanche	Colorado	68–72 (.486)	3rd of 4 (South)	Bill Hayes	did not qualify	140,111	
1996	Avalanche	Colorado	62–76 (.449)	4th of 4 (South)	Bill McGuire	did not qualify	173,703	
1997	Avalanche	Colorado	63–75 (.457)	2nd of 4 (South)	Bill McGuire	did not qualify	188,023	
1998	Avalanche	Colorado	62–78 (.443)	3rd of 4 (South)	Jay Loviglio	did not qualify	189,069	
1999	Avalanche	Colorado	69–69 (.500)	3rd of 4 (South)	Ron Gideon	did not qualify	206,012	
2000	Avalanche	Colorado	73–67 (.521)	2nd of 4 (South)	Alan Cockrell	did not qualify	200,863	
2001	Avalanche	Colorado	70–68 (.507)	3rd of 4 (South) (Note: In 2001, the Kinston Indians finished first in both halves of the split-season; Salem qualified as a wild card by finishing second in the 2nd half of the split-season.)	Dave Collins	defeated Kinston Indians (2–1) defeated Frederick Keys (3–2)	203,375	
2002	Avalanche	Colorado	74–66 (.529)	3rd of 4 (South)	Stu Cole	did not qualify	196,347	
2003	Avalanche	Houston	73–65 (.529)	1st of 4 (South) (Note: In 2003, Salem did not win either half of the split-season, despite finishing with the best overall record in their division.)	John Massarelli	did not qualify	175,155	
2004	Avalanche	Houston	65–74 (.468)	4th of 4 (South)	Russ Nixon	did not qualify	224,991	
2005	Avalanche	Houston	67–74 (.475)	3rd of 4 (South)	Iván DeJesús	did not qualify	255,225	
2006	Avalanche	Houston	76–61 (.555)	2nd of 4 (South) (Note: In 2006, Salem finished first in the 2nd half of the split-season.)	Jim Pankovits	lost to Kinston Indians (0–2)	237,724	
2007	Avalanche	Houston	79–60 (.568)	2nd of 4 (South) (Note: In 2007, the Kinston Indians finished first in both halves of the split-season; Salem qualified as a wild card by finishing second in the 2nd half of the split-season.)	Jim Pankovits	defeated Kinston Indians (2–1) lost to Frederick Keys (1–3)	258,469	
2008	Avalanche	Houston	56–84 (.400)	4th of 4 (South)	Jim Pankovits	did not qualify	235,823	
2009	Red Sox	Boston	67–72 (.482)	2nd of 4 (South) (Note: In 2009, the Winston-Salem Dash won the 1st half of the split-season, while for the 2nd half of the split-season, Salem and Winston-Salem tied for first place; both teams advanced to the playoffs.)	Chad Epperson	defeated Winston-Salem Dash (3–0) lost to Lynchburg Hillcats (0–3)	231,186	
2010	Red Sox	Boston	73–65 (.529)	2nd of 4 (South)	Kevin Boles	did not qualify	211,527	
2011	Red Sox	Boston	64–75 (.460)	4th of 4 (South)	Bruce Crabbe	did not qualify	226,337	
2012	Red Sox	Boston	68–69 (.496)	3rd of 4 (South)	Billy McMillon	did not qualify	178,730	
2013	Red Sox	Boston	76–64 (.543)	2nd of 4 (South) (Note: In 2013, Salem finished first in the 2nd half of the split-season.)	Billy McMillon	defeated Myrtle Beach Pelicans (2–0) defeated Potomac Nationals (3–0)	172,293	
2014	Red Sox	Boston	68–68 (.500)	2nd of 4 (South) (Note: In 2014, the Myrtle Beach Pelicans finished first in both halves of the split-season; Salem qualified as a wild card by finishing second in the 2nd half of the split-season.)	Carlos Febles	lost to Myrtle Beach Pelicans (1–2)	220,782	
2015	Red Sox	Boston	66–73 (.475)	4th of 4 (South)	Carlos Febles	did not qualify	228,120	
2016	Red Sox	Boston	87–52 (.626)	1st of 4 (South) (Note: In 2016, Salem finished first in the 1st half of the split-season.)	Joe Oliver	lost to Myrtle Beach Pelicans (1–2)	200,478	
2017	Red Sox	Boston	87–52 (.626)	2nd of 5 (North)	Joe Oliver	did not qualify	215,244	
2018	Red Sox	Boston	63–75 (.457)	5th of 5 (North)	Joe Oliver	did not qualify	192,621	
2019	Red Sox	Boston	67–70 (.489)	3rd of 5 (North) (Note: In 2019, Salem finished first in the 2nd half of the split-season.)	Corey Wimberly	lost to Wilmington Blue Rocks (2–3)	171,866	
2020	Red Sox	Boston	season canceled, COVID-19 pandemic		Corey Wimberly	—		
2021	Red Sox	Boston	71–49 (.592)	1st of 4 (North) (Note: In 2021, Salem finished first in their division, but did not qualify for the postseason. The league did not play a split season, and only the top two teams with the best overall records, regardless of division, advanced to the playoffs.)	Luke Montz	did not qualify	128,769	
2022	Red Sox	Boston	64–66 (.492)	4th of 6 (North)	Luke Montz	did not qualify	181,287	
2023	Red Sox	Boston	55–72 (.433)	5th of 6 (North)	Liam Carroll	did not qualify	177,083	
2024	Red Sox	Boston	70–62 (.530)	3rd of 6 (North)	Liam Carroll	did not qualify	185,784	
2025	Red Sox	Boston	56–74 (.431)	5th of 6 (North)	Ozzie Chavez	did not qualify	164,746	

== Notable former players ==
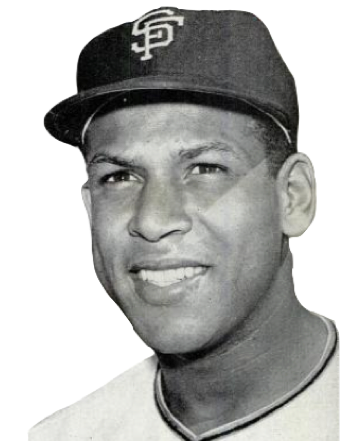
Orlando Cepeda

At least three inductees, most recently Dave Parker, to the National Baseball Hall of Fame played for Salem; Orlando Cepeda, who played 26 games for the Rebels in 1955, and Larry Walker, who played two rehabilitation games with the Avalanche in 1996.

Tim Murtaugh was a player, manager, and player-manager for Salem; he played 38 games for the 1965 Rebels, he managed the 1971 Rebels, and he appeared in 10 games while managing the 1972 Pirates.

Mario Mendoza played 136 games for Salem in 1972, registering a .221 batting average, slightly above the Mendoza Line that is named for him.

Daisuke Matsuzaka made a rehabilitation start for Salem in September 2009, in a Carolina League playoff game against the Winston-Salem Dash, and later made a regular-season rehabilitation start for Salem in 2012.

For notable players who made appearances with Salem, see:

- List of Salem Red Sox players (affiliated with Boston)
- List of Salem Avalanche players (affiliated with Houston and Colorado)
- List of Salem Buccaneers players (affiliated with Pittsburgh)
- List of Salem Redbirds players (affiliated with Texas and San Diego)
- List of Salem Pirates players (affiliated with Pittsburgh)
- List of Salem Rebels players (affiliated with Pittsburgh and San Francisco)

== Club records ==
- Batting: .370 – Oswaldo Olivares, 1977
- Hits: 208 – Oswaldo Olivares, 1977
- Doubles: 43 – Garrett Atkins, 2001
- Triples: 17 – David Arrington, 1968
- Home Runs: 34 – Gerald Davis, 1981
- Total Bases: 280 – Oswaldo Olivares, 1977
- Runs Batted In: 103 – Gerald Davis, 1981
- Stolen Bases: 84 – Miguel Diloné, 1975
- Wins: 16 – Jim Minshall 1972
- Losses: 15 – Frank Brosious, 1983; James McKee, 1970
- Strikeouts: 186 – Ed Whitson, 1976; Doug Bair, 1972
- Walks: 127 – Benjamin Willbank, 1978
- Innings Pitched: 203 – Ed Whitson, 1976
- Earned Run Average: 2.11 – Josh Kalinowski, 1999
- Saves: 27 – Travis Thompson, 1999

== Media information ==
Broadcaster History
Season(s)	Broadcaster
1987	Brian Barnhart
1988–1990	Dave Newman
1990–1992	Mike Minshall
1993–1994	Stu Paul
1995	Mark Neely
1996–1997	Mark Aucutt
1998–1999	Bob McElligott
2000–2003	Kevin Reiter
2004	Mick Gillispie
2005–2006	Adam Pohl
2007–2008	Jason Benetti
2009–2014	Evan Lepler
2015–2016	Kevin Burke
2017–2019	Ben Gellman
2019–2020	Melanie Newman
2020–2022	Kevin DiDomenico & Andy Loce
2023	Tyler Katz & Giovanni Heater
2024	Giovanni Heater & Carter Hill
2025–Present	Braden Schenck

- Media Relations Manager: Will Howell
  - Broadcaster: Braden Schenck
- Number of games broadcast: Home Games Only
- Newspapers covering the Red Sox:
  - The Roanoke Times
  - Salem Times-Register

In 2019, Melanie Newman joined Suzie Cool as part of the first all-female broadcast team in professional baseball when she served as play-by-play broadcaster for the Salem Red Sox.

== Team mascots ==
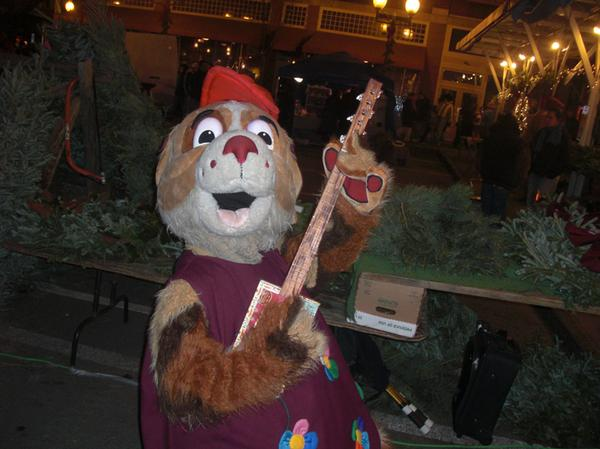
Mugsy

Mac the Yak is the new mascot introduced with the 2026 rebrand to the Salem Ridge Yaks.

Lefty and Righty, the team's newest mascots; two person-sized red socks, each wearing a Boston Red Sox hat; one has an "L" on its back, the other has an "R". These mascots were discontinued, leaving Mugsy as the team's lone mascot as of 2024.

Mugsy, a St. Bernard mascot who made his rookie debut in professional baseball in 1997 with the Avalanche. According to the team's website, Mugsy descended from the passing Hale-Bopp comet that raced across the Roanoke Valley sky on April 4, 1997.

Misty, a female saint bernard mascot who joined the team in 2005. As of 2021, Misty is no longer appearing at Red Sox games.

Big Mo, the Salem Avalanche's Kid's Club mascot; a giant abominable snowman.

The Baseball Nut, the Avalanche's first mascot, which resembled an almond. While the idea was original, the Baseball Nut proved to be unpopular. Lacking a cute or friendly appearance, the mascot intimidated children and was an object of derision by adult fans. Mugsy was developed as a replacement.

== Roster ==
Salem RidgeYaks roster
Players		Coaches/Other
Pitchers: 6 Jose Bello; 30 Harry Blum; 44 Yander Bonaci; 31 Nicolas De La Cruz; 33 Sabdiel Delzine; 99 Christian Foutch; 5 Madinson Frias; 34 Nicholas Judice; 22 Alex Kranzler; 1 Williams Montero; 15 Berny Ortiz; 24 Cam Padgett; 29 Carson Revay; 36 Wuilliams Rodriguez; 39 Yermain Ruiz; 26 Cole Tolbert; 35 Caden Vire; 20 Ethan Walker	Catchers: 18 Adonys Guzman; 34 Andruw Musett; 23 Franklin Primera; 13 Kleyver Salazar; Infielders: 14 Louis Andujar; 2 Colton Coates; 10 Anderson Fermin; 4 Wills Maginnis; 38 Starlyn Nunez; 11 D'Angelo Ortiz; 8 Avinson Pinto; Outfielders: 39 Justin Barry ~; 16 Josue Brito; 25 Andrews Opata; 3 Martin Shelar	Manager: 9 Ozzie Chavez; Coaches: 48 Brendan Argomaniz (assistant pitching); -- Nelson Paulino (hitting); 27 Ivan Quackenbush (assistant hitting); 51 Alex Reynolds (pitching); 26 Kyle Schmidt (coach); 29 Jack Simonetty (hitting); 60-day injured list: 4 Gilbel Galvan; 2 Ty Hodge; 23 Myles Patton (full season); 33 Dalvinson Reyes; 7-day injured list; * On Boston Red Sox 40-man roster; ~ Development list; # Rehab assignment; ∞ Reserve list; ‡ Restricted list; § Suspended list; † Temporarily inactive list; Roster updated September 10, 2026; Transactions; → More rosters: MiLB • Carolina League; → Boston Red Sox minor league players
