= Steve Demeter =

American baseball player (1935–2013)

- Third baseman
- Born: January 27, 1935; Homer City, Pennsylvania, U.S.
- Died: February 3, 2013 (aged 78); Parma, Ohio, U.S.
- Batted: Right Threw: Right

MLB debut
- July 29, 1959, for the Detroit Tigers

Last MLB appearance
- May 6, 1960, for the Cleveland Indians

MLB statistics
- Batting average: .087
- Home runs: 0
- Runs batted in: 1
- Stats at Baseball Reference

Teams
- As player: Detroit Tigers (1959); Cleveland Indians (1960); As coach: Pittsburgh Pirates (1985)

Stephen Demeter (January 27, 1935 – February 3, 2013) was an American professional baseball player, manager, coach and scout. He played in Major League Baseball for parts of two seasons, appearing in 15 games as a third baseman and pinch hitter in 1959 and 1960. Demeter was born in Homer City, Pennsylvania; he threw and batted right-handed and was listed as 5 feet 9 inches (1.75 m) tall and 185 pounds (84 kg).

== Career ==
Demeter graduated from Homer City High School and signed with the Detroit Tigers in 1953. During his seventh season in the Tiger farm system, he was recalled in July 1959 and appeared in 11 games over the remainder of the American League schedule, starting two games at third base. He collected two hits, including a double, in 18 plate appearances and at bats.

Then, prior to the 1960 season, on April 12, he was traded to the Cleveland Indians for first baseman Norm Cash in what turned out to be one of the most lop-sided trades in MLB history. Demeter played only four games and went hitless in five at bats for the Indians before being returned to the minor leagues, from which he never returned. Cash won the 1961 AL batting championship (.361), became one of the top sluggers of the 1960s (hitting 377 career home runs), appeared in 2,018 games in a Tiger uniform and made four All-Star teams.

Demeter played 19 seasons of minor league baseball (1953–1970, 1972). He was a fixture of the Rochester Red Wings teams of the mid- to late 1960s, hitting 272 minor league home runs over his long career. He was inducted into both the Rochester Red Wings Hall of Fame, in 1990, and the International League Hall of Fame, in 2009.

He also had a long tenure as a coach and manager. He served one year (in 1985) as a coach with the MLB Pittsburgh Pirates, working at first base through June 13, and then as bench coach. He also managed for nine seasons in the Pirates' farm system, at the helm of the Sherbrooke Pirates (1972), Salem Pirates (1973, 1976–1977), Charleston Charlies (1974–1975), Shreveport Captains (1978), and Buffalo Bisons (1979–1980) and was a roving instructor and scout for the Bucs.

== Personal life ==
Steve Demeter died in Parma, Ohio, at age 78 on February 3, 2013. A grandson, Derek Dietrich, played 746 games in the majors from 2013 to 2020 as a member of the Miami Marlins, Cincinnati Reds and Texas Rangers, as a versatile infielder-outfielder.

Sporting positions
Preceded by Franchise established	Sherbrooke Pirates manager 1972	Succeeded by Tim Murtaugh
Preceded by Joe Morgan	Charleston Charlies manager 1974–1975	Succeeded by Tim Murtaugh
Preceded by Tim Murtaugh	Shreveport Captains manager 1978	Succeeded by Andy Gilbert
Preceded by Franchise established	Buffalo Bisons manager 1979–1980	Succeeded by Johnny Lipon
Preceded by Alex Monchak	Pittsburgh Pirates first base coach 1985; April 9–June 13	Succeeded by Willie Stargell
Preceded by Milt Graff	Pittsburgh Pirates bench coach 1985; June 14–October 6	Succeeded by Bill Virdon
