= Derek Dietrich =

American baseball player (born 1989)

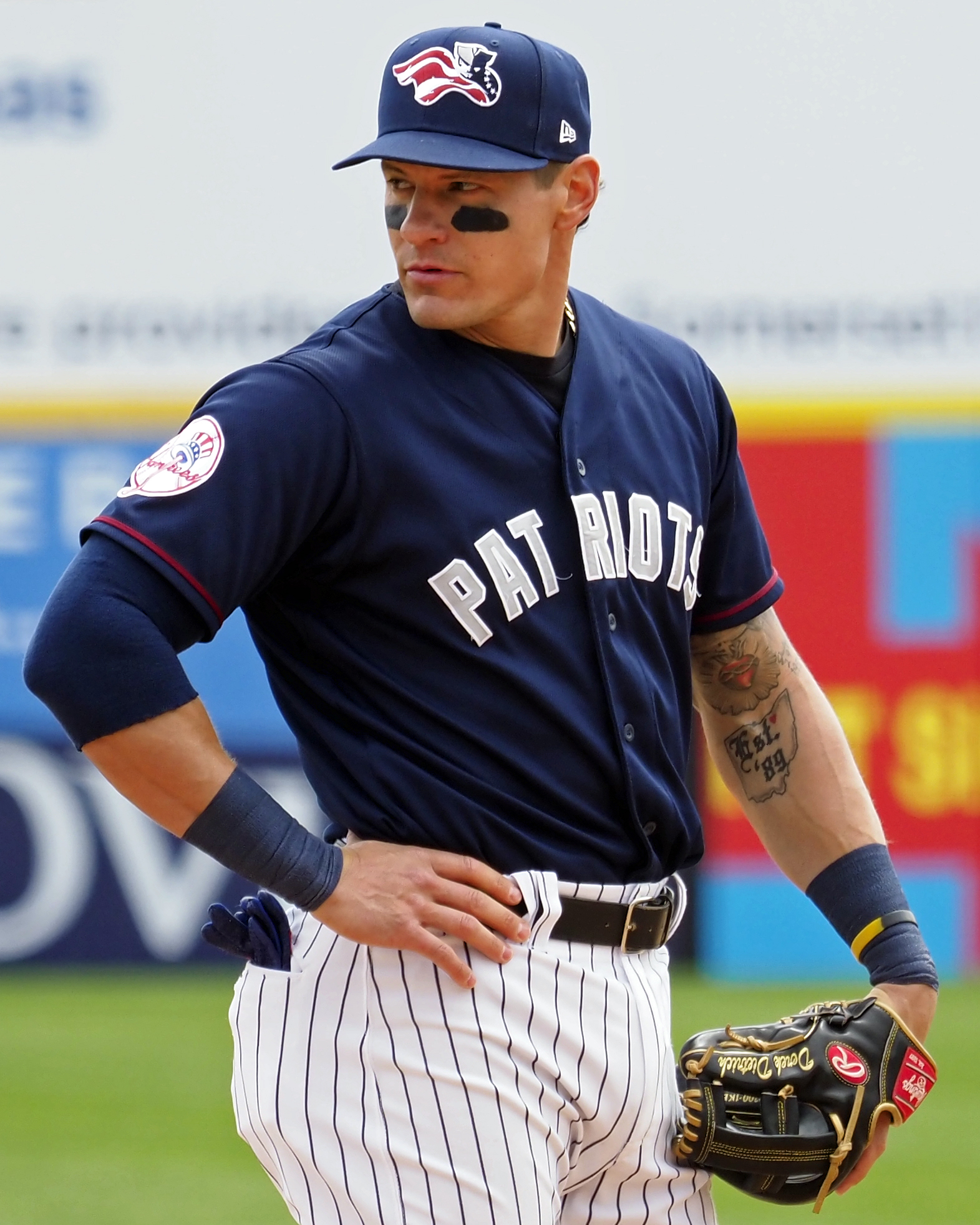
- Dietrich with the Somerset Patriots in 2022
- Infielder / Outfielder
- Born: July 18, 1989 (age 37); Cleveland, Ohio, U.S.
- Batted: Left Threw: Right

MLB debut
- May 8, 2013, for the Miami Marlins

Last MLB appearance
- September 27, 2020, for the Texas Rangers

MLB statistics
- Batting average: .245
- Home runs: 84
- Runs batted in: 255
- Stats at Baseball Reference

Teams
- Miami Marlins (2013–2018); Cincinnati Reds (2019); Texas Rangers (2020)

Derek Richard Dietrich (born July 18, 1989) is an American former professional baseball infielder and outfielder. He played in Major League Baseball (MLB) for the Miami Marlins, Cincinnati Reds, and Texas Rangers. Prior to playing professionally, Dietrich starred at St. Ignatius High School in Cleveland, Ohio and played for the Georgia Tech Yellow Jackets. While primarily a second baseman, he has also played left field and third base during his career.

== Early life and education ==
Dietrich attended St. Ignatius High School in Cleveland, Ohio. One of the top high school players in the country, he took part in the East Coast Professional Baseball Showcase and the AFLAC All-American game while he was a senior.

The Houston Astros selected Dietrich with their first selection, with the 111th overall selection in the third round, of the 2007 Major League Baseball draft. Dietrich opted not to sign, instead choosing to attend the Georgia Institute of Technology, where he played college baseball for the Georgia Tech Yellow Jackets baseball team. He was named the Atlantic Coast Conference's co-player of the week from March 23–28, 2010. He also played collegiate summer baseball for the Wareham Gatemen of the Cape Cod Baseball League in 2009 and was named a league all-star.

== Professional career ==
=== Tampa Bay Rays ===
The Tampa Bay Rays selected Dietrich in the second round, with the 79th overall selection, in the 2010 Major League Baseball draft. He signed with the Rays and made his professional debut with the Hudson Valley Renegades of the Low–A New York–Penn League that summer. In 2011, while playing for the Bowling Green Hot Rods in the Single–A Midwest League, he set a team record for home runs in a season and was named a Midwest League all-star.

Dietrich played for the Charlotte Stone Crabs of the High–A Florida State League and Montgomery Biscuits of the Double–A Southern League in 2012. After the 2012 season, the Rays traded Dietrich to the Miami Marlins for Yunel Escobar. The Marlins assigned Dietrich to the Jacksonville Suns of the Southern League at the start of the 2013 season.

=== Miami Marlins ===
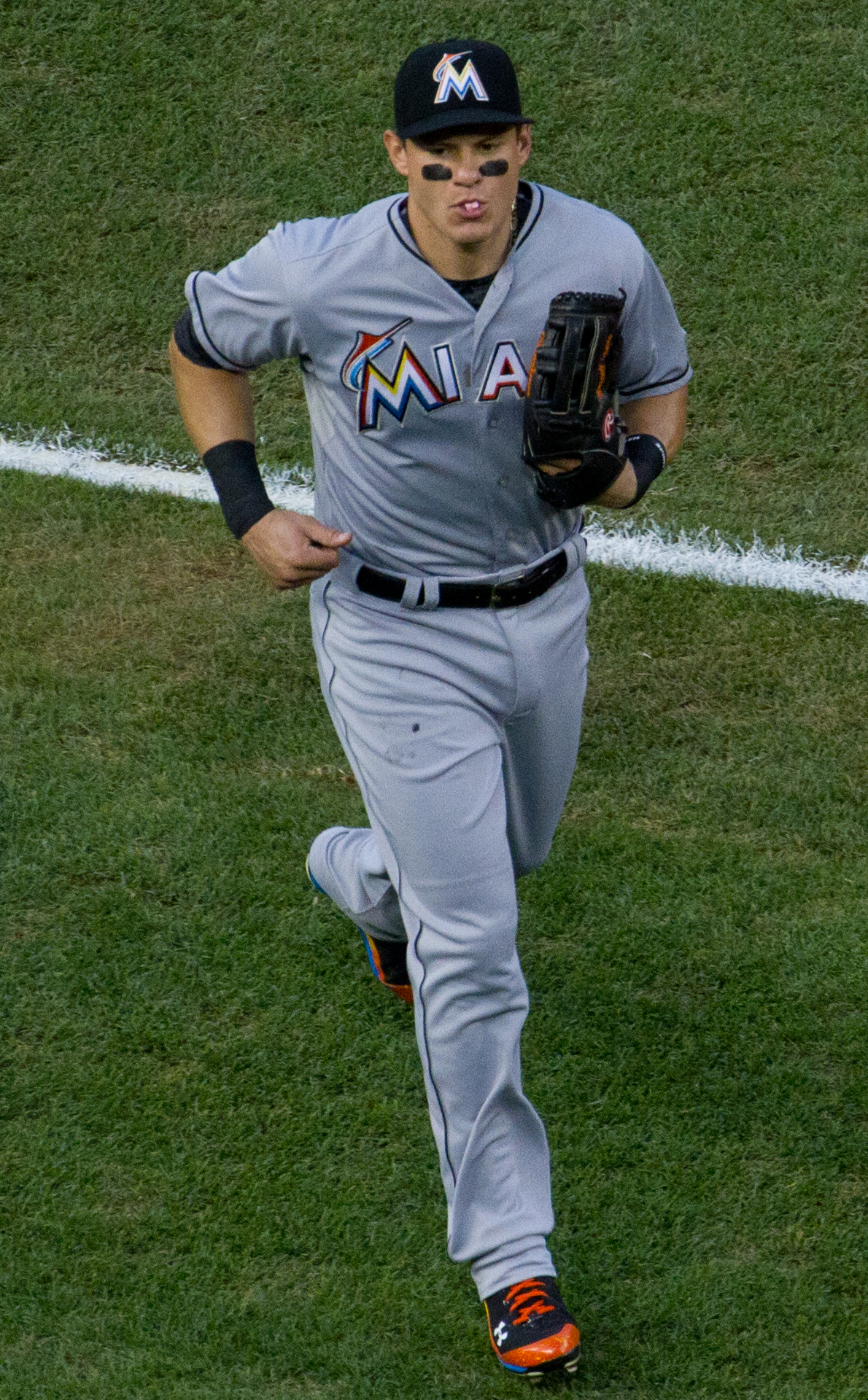
Dietrich with the Miami Marlins

Following injuries to Donovan Solano and Chris Valaika, the Marlins promoted Dietrich to the major leagues on May 8, 2013, and he made his MLB debut that day. He was optioned back to Jacksonville on July 22.

In 2014, Dietrich served as the Marlins' starting second baseman. They optioned Dietrich to the New Orleans Zephyrs of the Triple–A Pacific Coast League in June due to his poor defense. After the season, Dietrich played winter baseball in the Dominican Professional Baseball League, but his season ended prematurely due to an ankle injury.

Dietrich began the 2015 season with New Orleans. The Marlins promoted him to the major leagues on June 12. In 2016, Dietrich batted .279, and was 2nd in the major leagues in hit by pitch, with 24. He had his best offensive season in 2017, posting career highs in games played (135), at bats (406), runs (56), home runs (13), RBI (53) and walks (36).

In 2018, Dietrich batted .265/.330/.421. He tied for the major league lead in hit by pitch, with 21. Dietrich was designated for assignment on November 20. After clearing waivers, Dietrich elected free agency on November 26.

=== Cincinnati Reds ===
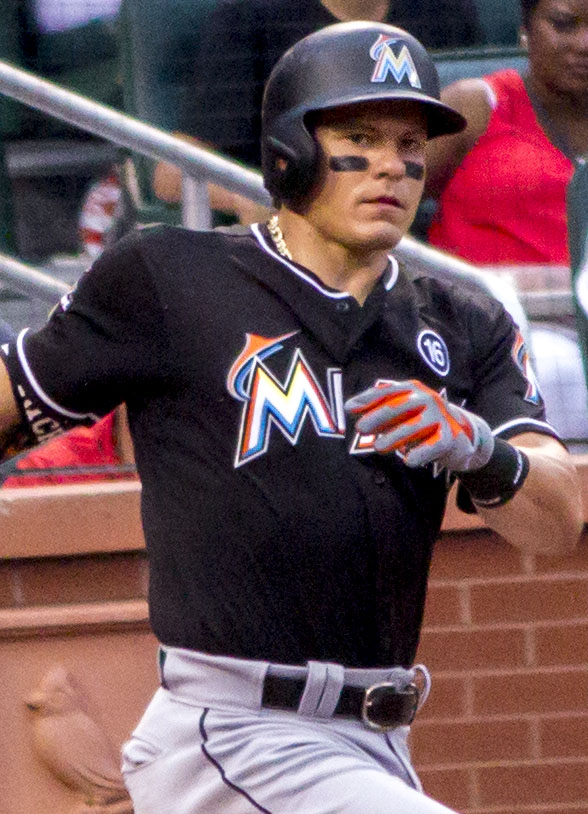
Dietrich with the Miami Marlins in 2017

On February 19, 2019, Dietrich signed a minor league contract with the Cincinnati Reds, receiving a non-roster invitation to spring training. In his Reds debut on March 28, Dietrich hit a three-run home run as part of a 5–3 win on Opening Day over the Pirates.

In a game on April 7, 2019, against the Pittsburgh Pirates, Dietrich hit a second-inning, two-run home run that landed in the Allegheny River off of Pirates starter Chris Archer. As the ball flew over the wall, Dietrich stayed at home plate and admired the ball for a few seconds as it went over before he started running. When Dietrich returned to bat in the fourth inning, Archer threw a ball behind Dietrich's back. Home plate umpire Jeff Kellogg issued Archer a warning, much to the irritation of Reds manager David Bell. As Bell argued with the umpire, benches cleared and Yasiel Puig attempted to throw punches at the Pirates players. In the end of the incident, five people were ejected: Bell, Puig, Reds southpaw Amir Garrett, Pirates setup man Keone Kela, and Pirates closer Felipe Vázquez. When play resumed, Dietrich was struck out by Chris Archer, but got another two-run home run, also hit into the river, later in the game off of Pirates pitcher Nick Kingham.

In late June 2019, Dietrich set a new MLB record for being hit by pitch in a single series, when he was hit six times in the first three games of a four-game series with the Milwaukee Brewers. After the 2019 season, the Reds sent Dietrich outright off of the 25-man roster to the Louisville Bats. On February 12, 2020, Dietrich re-signed with the Reds on a minor league deal.

On July 20, 2020, the Reds released Dietrich per his request. Dietrich had an opt-out clause in his contract. Dietrich was not expected to have a large role with the Reds for the 2020 season.

=== Chicago Cubs ===
On July 23, 2020, Dietrich signed a minor league contract with the Chicago Cubs and joined the team's 60-man player pool. Dietrich was granted his release by the organization on August 9, 2020, having never played a game for them.

=== Texas Rangers ===
On August 10, 2020, Dietrich signed a minor league deal with the Texas Rangers. He was selected to the active roster on August 11. In his debut on August 12, he went 3-for-3, in addition to being hit by a pitch, and scored two runs. He sparked a come from behind rally in the bottom of the 8th inning, propelling the Rangers to a 7–4 victory.

=== New York Yankees ===
On February 12, 2021, Dietrich signed a minor league contract with the New York Yankees for the 2021 season, receiving a non-roster invitation to spring training. On March 27, 2021, Dietrich was released by the Yankees, but re-signed with the Yankees on a new minor league contract two days later. In 36 games with the Triple-A Scranton/Wilkes-Barre RailRiders, Dietrich logged a .215/.415/.393 slash with 5 home runs and 22 RBI. Dietrich opted out of his minor league deal on July 3, and elected free agency.

=== Washington Nationals ===
On July 9, 2021, Dietrich signed a minor league contract with the Washington Nationals organization and was assigned to the Triple-A Rochester Red Wings. Dietrich played in 43 games for Rochester, hitting .121 with 3 home runs and 13 RBI's. On September 13, Dietrich was released by the Nationals.

=== New York Yankees (second stint) ===
On April 18, 2022, Dietrich signed a minor league contract with the New York Yankees. On August 5, Dietrich was suspended by Major League Baseball for 50 games after testing positive for dimethylpentylamine, a banned substance under the Minor League Drug Prevention and Treatment Program. In 62 games split between the Triple–A Scranton/Wilkes-Barre RailRiders and Double–A Somerset Patriots, he batted .263/.352/.515 with 10 home runs and 39 RBI. Dietrich elected free agency following the season on November 10.

=== Acereros de Monclova ===
On May 26, 2023, Dietrich signed with the Acereros de Monclova of the Mexican League. In 8 games, he batted .143/.250/.200 with 5 hits and 2 RBI. Dietrich was released by Monclova on June 13.

== Post-playing career ==
On March 5, 2024, it was announced that Dietrich had joined the New York Yankees as an advisor to the team's player development system. His specific title was announced as the "culture and accountability coordinator.”

== Personal life ==
Dietrich's grandfather, Steve Demeter, played in Major League Baseball. Dietrich credits his grandfather with teaching him about the game of baseball.

Dietrich is a juggler and performs at community events and hospitals for children.

Dietrich was in a relationship with professional tennis player Monica Puig; the two met when he was playing for the Miami Marlins and she was invited to throw the first pitch; they began dating in early 2017. In 2019, when Dietrich was playing for the Cincinnati Reds, Puig served a first pitch during a game using a tennis racket.
