= Billy McMillon =

American baseball player and coach (born 1971)

- Outfielder
- Born: November 17, 1971 (age 54); Alamogordo, New Mexico, U.S.
- Batted: Left Threw: Left

MLB debut
- July 26, 1996, for the Florida Marlins

Last MLB appearance
- October 3, 2004, for the Oakland Athletics

MLB statistics
- Batting average: .248
- Home runs: 16
- Runs batted in: 93
- Stats at Baseball Reference

Teams
- Florida Marlins (1996–1997); Philadelphia Phillies (1997); Detroit Tigers (2000–2001); Oakland Athletics (2001, 2003–2004)

William Edward McMillon (born November 17, 1971) is an American former professional baseball outfielder and currently manager of the Fredericksburg Nationals. He played in Major League Baseball (MLB) during six seasons between 1996 and 2004 for four different teams. As a player, he threw and batted left-handed, stood 5 feet 11 inches (1.80 m) tall, and weighed 172 pounds (78 kg). He was inducted into the International League Hall of Fame.

Since retiring as a player, McMillon has been a coach and manager in Minor League Baseball. He worked in the Boston Red Sox organization from 2008 to 2021, serving as the manager of the Pawtucket/Worcester Red Sox, Boston's Triple-A, in 2019 and 2021. He joined the Washington Nationals organization in 2022, becoming coach of Fredericksburg before the 2025 season.

== Early years ==
McMillon was born in Alamogordo, New Mexico and graduated from high school in Bishopville, South Carolina. He attended Clemson University where be he played college baseball from 1991 to 1993 for the Tigers, accruing a .382 batting average. He was selected by the Florida Marlins in the eighth round of the 1993 MLB draft.

== Playing career ==
McMillon first played professionally in 1993 for the Elmira Pioneers, a farm team of the Marlins. In 1994, McMillon played for the Kane County Cougars and was selected as a starter for the Midwest League all-star game. Prior to the 1995 season, McMillon played in a spring training game with replacement players, though the Major League Baseball Players Association later determined that McMillon was not a replacement player during the ongoing strike, due to fraud by the Marlins. In the 1995 season with the Portland Sea Dogs, then a Marlins affiliate, McMillon batted .313 with 14 home runs and 93 runs batted in (RBIs). He led the Eastern League in hits and walks, with 162 and 96, respectively. He was named an outfielder on the Eastern League postseason all-star team and was named the league's most valuable player. McMillon advanced to Triple-A in 1996; playing for the Charlotte Knights, he was named International League rookie of the year.

McMillon had his major league debut during 1996 with the Marlins, and went on to hit .188 in 41 MLB games during parts of that season and the next. He was traded to the Philadelphia Phillies for Darren Daulton on July 21, 1997. With the Phillies in 1997, McMillon played in 24 games and batted .292 with two home runs and 13 RBIs. He next played in MLB during 2000 and 2001 with the Detroit Tigers, appearing in 66 games while batting .255 with five home runs and 28 RBIs. McMillon's final MLB team was the Oakland Athletics, whom he played for during 2001, 2003, and 2004. With Oakland, he batted .248 with nine home runs and 47 RBIs in 138 games. He played in three major league postseason games with Oakland during the 2003 American League Division Series, collecting one hit in six at bats.

Overall, McMillon appeared in a 269 MLB games, batting .248 with 16 home runs and 93 RBIs. Defensively, he played 133 games as an outfielder, 43 games as a designated hitter, and six games as a first baseman. He had a .974 fielding percentage as an outfielder.

McMillon also played in 992 minor league games during parts of 11 seasons, with a .304 batting average, 127 home runs, and 610 RBIs. In 2019, McMillon was selected for induction to the International League Hall of Fame.

== Managing and coaching career ==
McMillon joined the Red Sox organization as batting coach of the Single-A Greenville Drive of the South Atlantic League in 2008 and 2009, then became to manager of the Drive in 2010. In two seasons, he led Greenville to a 155–124 record and one playoff appearance. On January 20, 2012, he was named manager of the Salem Red Sox of the Class A-Advanced Carolina League. After finishing one game under .500 in 2012, he was retained as Salem's manager for the 2013 season and led his team to the Carolina League championship. Salem won the second half Southern Division title, and then bested the Myrtle Beach Pelicans and the Potomac Nationals in the playoffs. The Salem Red Sox won their final 11 games during the regular season and playoffs.

On December 18, 2013, McMillon was named manager of the Portland Sea Dogs, the Red Sox' affiliate in the Double-A Eastern League and the team that he had played for (with the Marlins) in 1995. His managerial debut with the 2014 Sea Dogs produced a first-place finish in the Eastern League's Northern Division with an 88–54 record. McMillon was named the league's manager of the year. During the season, his club included top prospects such as Mookie Betts, Blake Swihart, Henry Owens, Deven Marrero, Brian Johnson, Eduardo Rodríguez, and Travis Shaw; all but Rodríguez were promoted to higher levels by the time of the Eastern League playoffs, when Portland fell to the Binghamton Mets in the first round. McMillon returned to manage the Sea Dogs in 2015; the team finished with a 53–89 record.

McMillon spent 2016 to 2018 as the roving minor league outfield and base running coordinator in the Red Sox' farm system.

In December 2018, McMillon returned to managing, becoming the 18th manager of the Pawtucket Red Sox in the team's Triple-A history, and 21st overall since the team was established as a Double-A franchise in 1970. The 2019 PawSox finished with a record of 59–81. McMillon returned as manager for 2020, but the minor league season was cancelled due to the COVID-19 pandemic. McMillon became the first manager of the Worcester Red Sox, which succeeded Pawtucket as Boston's Triple-A affiliate in 2021. He was replaced at the end of 2021 by Chad Tracy.

From 2022 to 2024, he was the development coach for the Rochester Red Wings, the Triple-A affiliate of the Washington Nationals. On December 18, 2024, McMillon was named the manager of the Fredericksburg Nationals, the Class-A affiliate of the Nationals.

=== Managerial record ===
| Year | Team (Class) | W | L | Pct. | Notes |
|---|---|---|---|---|---|
| 2010 | Greenville Drive (A) | 77 | 62 | .554 | Lost in league finals |
| 2011 | Greenville Drive (A) | 78 | 62 | .557 | |
| 2012 | Salem Red Sox (A+) | 68 | 69 | .496 | |
| 2013 | Salem Red Sox (A+) | 76 | 64 | .543 | League champions |
| 2014 | Portland Sea Dogs (AA) | 88 | 54 | .620 | Lost in semifinals |
| 2015 | Portland Sea Dogs (AA) | 53 | 89 | .373 | |
| 2019 | Pawtucket Red Sox (AAA) | 59 | 81 | .421 | |
| 2020 | Pawtucket Red Sox (AAA) | — | — | — | Season cancelled |
| 2021 | Worcester Red Sox (AAA) | 74 | 54 | .578 | |
| 2025 | Fredericksburg Nationals (A) | 65 | 64 | .504 | |
| Total | | 638 | 599 | .516 | |

== Personal life ==
McMillon has a bachelor's degree from Clemson and an MBA from the University of Phoenix. While at Clemson, he was initiated in the Pi Alpha chapter of Alpha Phi Alpha fraternity. McMillon was elected into the Clemson University Athletic Hall of Fame in 2012. He, his wife, and two children reside in Columbia, South Carolina.

| Preceded by Kevin Boles | Greenville Drive manager 2010–2011 | Succeeded by Carlos Febles |
| Preceded by Bruce Crabbe | Salem Red Sox manager 2012–2013 | Succeeded by Carlos Febles |
| Preceded by Kevin Boles | Portland Sea Dogs manager 2014–2015 | Succeeded by Carlos Febles |
| Preceded by Kevin Boles | Pawtucket Red Sox manager 2019–2020 | Succeeded by Franchise dissolved |
| Preceded by Franchise established | Worcester Red Sox manager 2021 | Succeeded by Chad Tracy |
