= Kevin Boles =

American baseball player (born 1975)

- Born: January 16, 1975 (age 51); Chicago, Illinois, U.S.
- Bats: Left Throws: Right
- Stats at Baseball Reference

Kevin Patrick Boles (born January 16, 1975) is an American professional baseball manager. Boles is the manager of the Montgomery Biscuits the Double-A affiliate of the Tampa Bay Rays.

He is the son of former Florida Marlins manager and longtime player development executive John Boles.

== Playing career ==
Kevin Boles graduated from Cardinal Mooney High School in Sarasota, Florida, and the University of South Florida, where he received a bachelor's degree in communications. A catcher, he was selected in the 42nd round of the June 1998 amateur draft by the Chicago Cubs and played one season of professional baseball, appearing in 20 games (11 in the field) for the 1998 Williamsport Cubs of the Short Season-A New York–Penn League. Boles collected seven hits in 34 at bats, with one double and three runs batted in, for a batting average of .206. He played errorless ball in the field, but allowed six stolen bases in as many attempts. The 5 foot, 11 inch (1.8 m), 185-pound (84 kg) Boles batted left-handed and threw right-handed.

== As a manager ==
He began his managing career in the Marlins' farm system in 2000 in the Rookie-level Gulf Coast League, and, in addition to the Marlins and Mets, he has worked in the organizations of the Kansas City Royals, Minnesota Twins and Boston Red Sox. He has managed at the full-season Class A level with the Beloit Snappers, Quad Cities River Bandits, Fort Myers Miracle, Greenville Drive and Salem Red Sox.

In 2013, Boles spent his third consecutive season as skipper of the Portland Sea Dogs, the Red Sox' Eastern League affiliate. Each of his Portland teams finished below .500, compiling a composite record of 195–229 (.460), but Boles' Seadogs developed players such as Xander Bogaerts, Jackie Bradley Jr., Drake Britton, Will Middlebrooks, Junichi Tazawa, Alex Wilson and Brandon Workman, who all contributed materially to the MLB Red Sox' 2013 American League pennant and World Series triumph.

In 2014, Boles led Pawtucket to a 79–65 record, a wild-card playoff berth, and the fourth Governors' Cup championship in club history. The 2014 Pawtucket Red Sox also developed Major League prospects Matt Barnes, Mookie Betts, Garin Cecchini, Rubby De La Rosa, Henry Owens, Anthony Ranaudo, Travis Shaw, Blake Swihart, Christian Vázquez, Allen Webster and others. He resigned as the manager of the PawSox after the 2018 season, in which Pawtucket finished 66–73 and out of the playoffs. His appointment as manager of the Pawtucket Red Sox in 2014 represented his first assignment at the highest level of minor league baseball.

In 2016, he also managed the Perth Heat in the Australian Baseball League.

In 2018 Boles spent his fifth consecutive season as manager of the Pawtucket Red Sox of the International League, Triple-A affiliate of the Boston Red Sox.

Through 2018, Boles' 18-season regular-season managerial record was 1,142 victories and 1,152 defeats (.498). The PawSox' 2014 International League title is the second of his career; his 2003 AZL Royals Blue team captured the Rookie-level Arizona League championship.

Boles was named as the Manager for the Binghamton Rumble Ponies of the New York Mets organization for the 2019 season.

In 2022, Boles was named as manager for the Syracuse Mets for the 2022 season.

In 2026, Boles was named as manager for the Montgomery Biscuits the Double-A affiliate of the Tampa Bay Rays.

Preceded by Arnie Beyeler	Portland Sea Dogs manager 2011–2013	Succeeded by Billy McMillon
Preceded by Gary DiSarcina	Pawtucket Red Sox manager 2014–2018	Succeeded by Billy McMillon
Preceded by Luis Rojas	Binghamton Rumble Ponies manager 2019–2021	Succeeded by Reid Brignac
Preceded by Chad Kreuter	Syracuse Mets manager 2022	Succeeded by Dick Scott
