= Luke Montz =

American baseball player (born 1983)

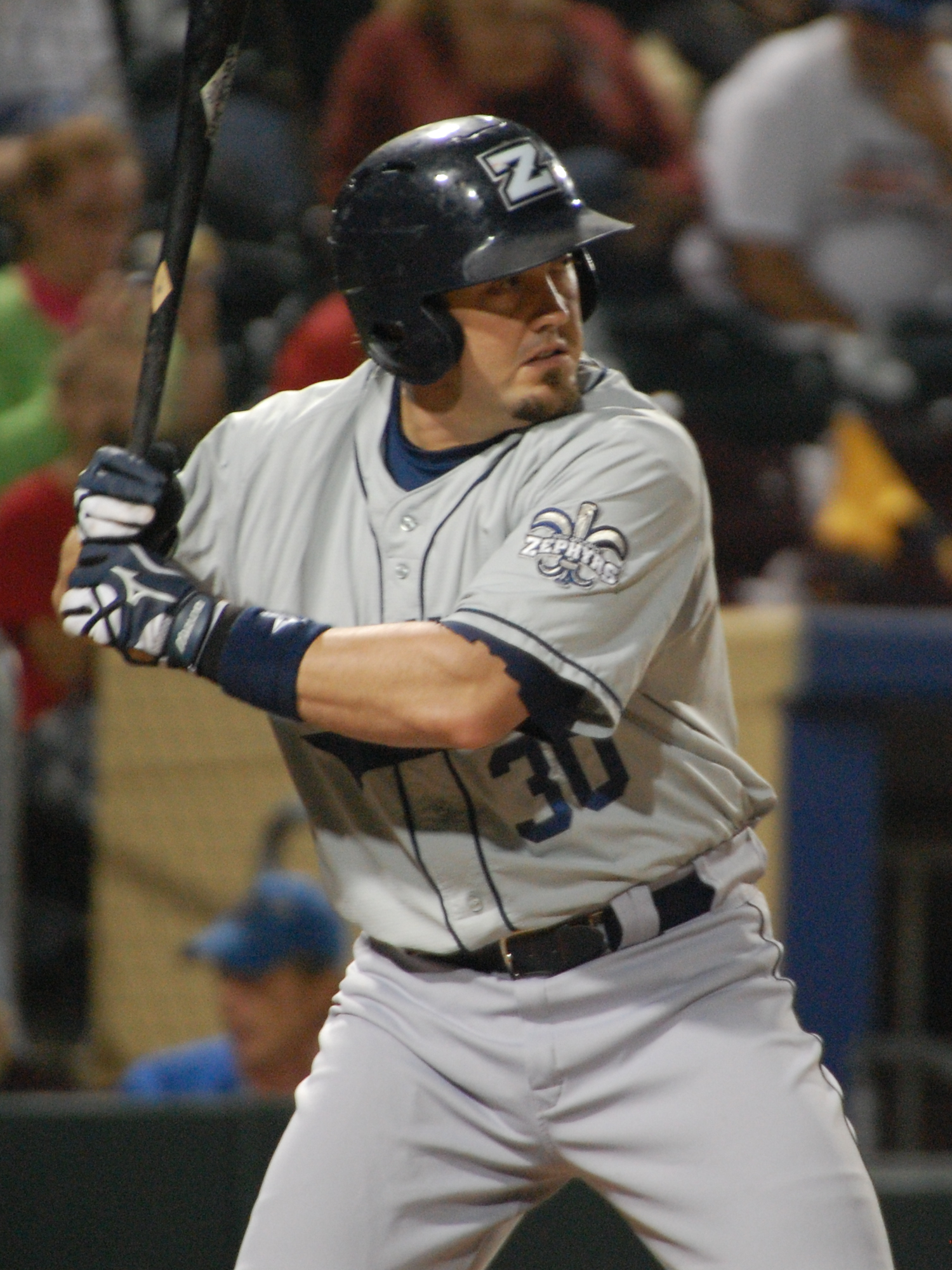
- Montz batting for the New Orleans Zephyrs in 2010
- Catcher
- Born: July 7, 1983 (age 42); Lafayette, Louisiana, U.S.
- Batted: Right Threw: Right

MLB debut
- September 4, 2008, for the Washington Nationals

Last appearance
- May 30, 2013, for the Oakland Athletics

MLB statistics
- Batting average: .163
- Home runs: 2
- Runs batted in: 8
- Stats at Baseball Reference

Teams
- Washington Nationals (2008); Oakland Athletics (2013)

Luke Montz (born July 7, 1983) is an American professional baseball manager and former catcher. He played in Minor League Baseball from 2003 to 2015, and played a total of 23 games in Major League Baseball (MLB) for the Washington Nationals and Oakland Athletics. As a player, Montz was listed at 6 feet 1 inch (1.85 m) and 225 pounds (102 kg); he batted and threw right-handed.

== Playing career ==
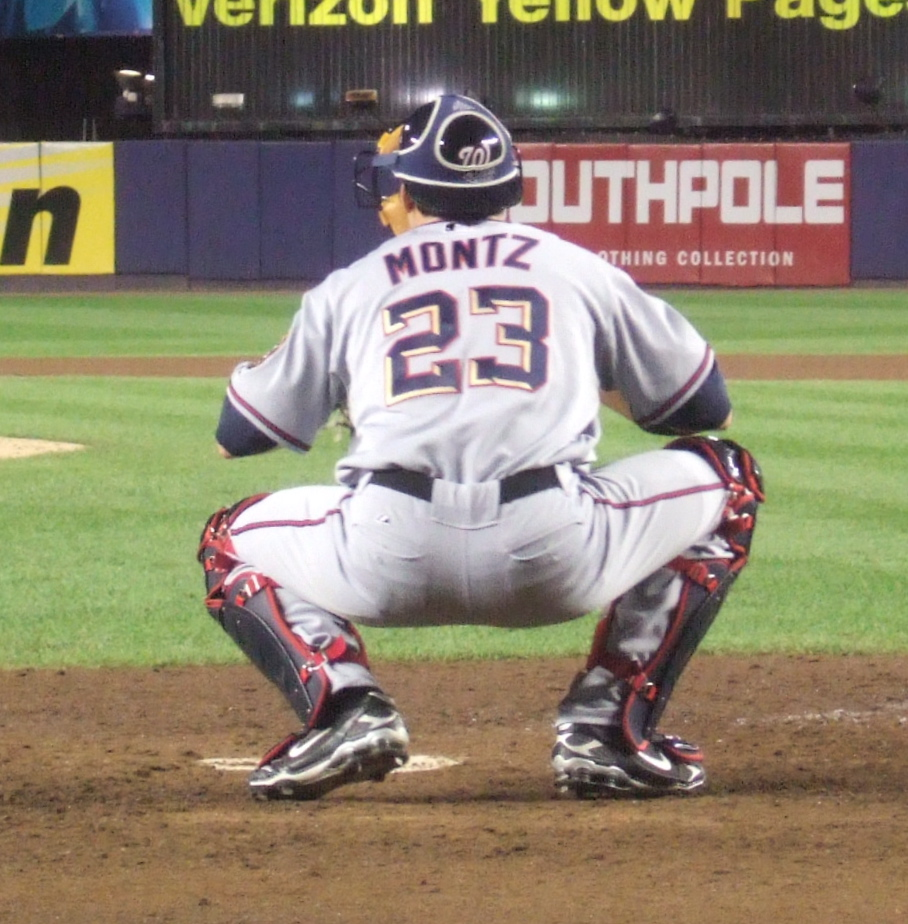
Montz with the Washington Nationals in 2008

=== Washington Nationals ===
Montz was drafted by the then-Montreal Expos in the 17th round of the 2003 Major League Baseball draft. He played in the minor leagues from 2003 through 2008, progressing from Rookie League to Triple-A. Montz made his major league debut on September 4, 2008, for the Washington Nationals against the Atlanta Braves; in that game, he went 0-for-3. Through the end of the 2008 season, Montz appeared in 10 games with the Nationals, batting 3-for-21 (.143).

Montz spent the 2009 season in Washington's farm system, hitting .181/.288/.313 with nine home and 36 RBI in 103 appearances split between the Double-A Harrisburg Senators and Triple-A Syracuse Chiefs. On September 10, 2009, Montz was designated for assignment by the Nationals following the acquisition of Jesse English.

=== New York Mets ===
On January 5, 2010, Montz signed a minor league contract with the New York Mets organization. He played in 44 games split between the rookie-level Gulf Coast League Mets, High-A St. Lucie Mets, and Double-A Binghamton Mets, hitting a combined .203/.295/.308 with four home runs, 19 RBI, and one stolen base. Montz elected free agency following the season on November 6.

=== Florida Marlins ===
On January 28, 2011, Montz signed a minor league contract with the Florida Marlins. In 118 appearances for the Triple-A Jacksonville Suns, he batted .273/.391/.509 with 22 home runs and 78 RBI. Montz elected free agency following the season on November 2.

On November 27, 2011, Montz re-signed with the Marlins organization on a minor league contract. In 2012, he played for the Triple-A New Orleans Zephyrs, splitting his time between catching and playing first base. For the year, he slashed .222/.310/.495 with 29 home runs and 74 RBI.

=== Oakland Athletics ===
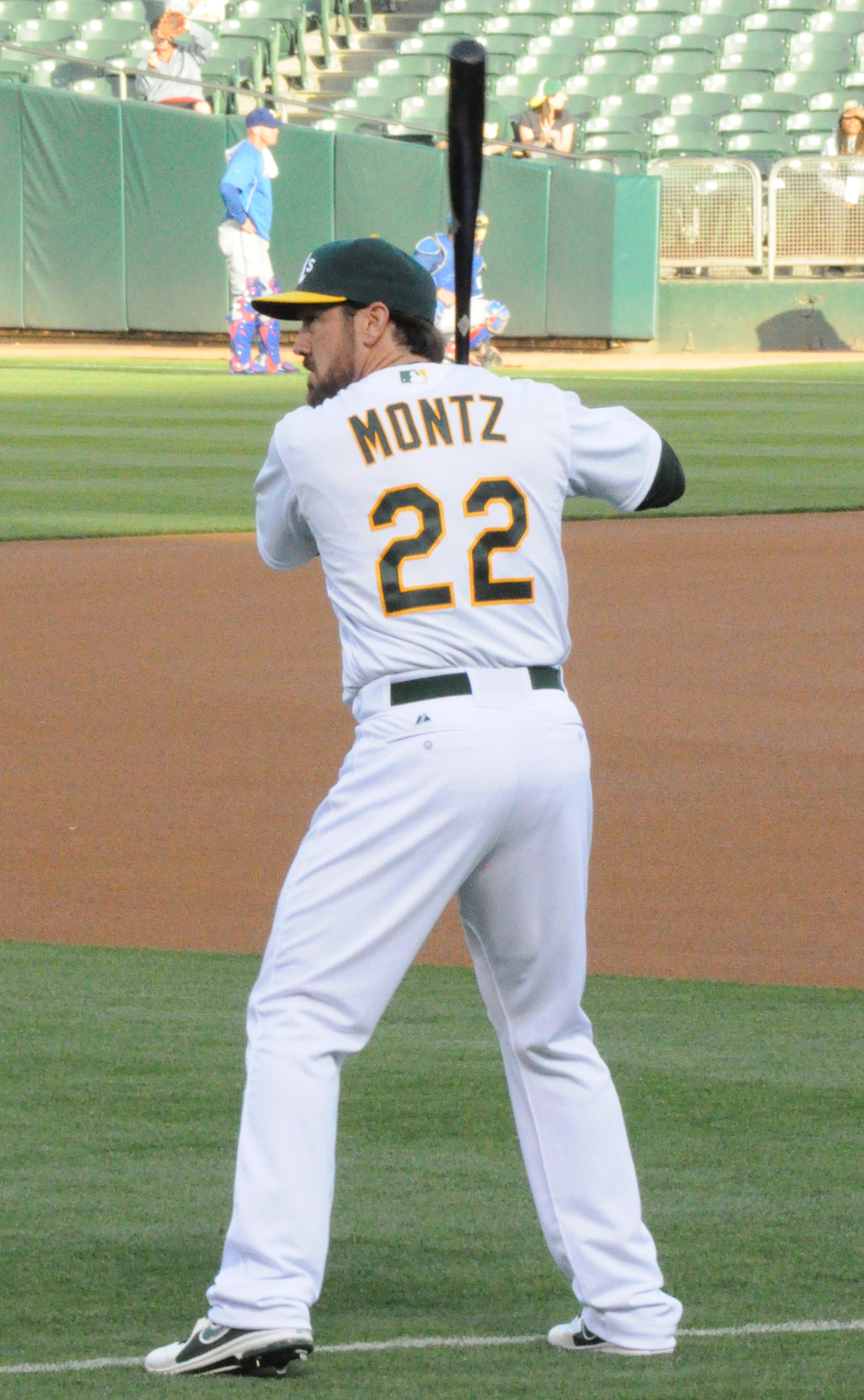
Montz with the Oakland Athletics in 2013

Montz signed a minor league contract with the Oakland Athletics on November 9, 2012. On May 1, 2013, the Athletics selected Montz's contract after Coco Crisp was placed on the disabled list. He appeared in 13 games for Oakland, going 5-for-28 (.179) with one home run and five RBI. Montz was designated for assignment by Oakland on September 1. He was released by the team on September 3.

On October 12, 2013, Montz re-signed with Oakland on a minor league contract. He played briefly during the 2014 season for the rookie-level Arizona League Athletics, as a result of shoulder surgery that ended his 2013 season in July.

=== Boston Red Sox ===
On December 4, 2014, Montz signed a minor league contract with the Boston Red Sox. He made 48 appearances for the Triple-A Pawtucket Red Sox on the season, slashing .167/.270/.333 with five home runs, 21 RBI, and one stolen base. Montz was released by the Red Sox organization on June 27, 2015.

== Post-playing career ==
=== Boston Red Sox ===
Montz spent 2018 as a coach with the Portland Sea Dogs, the Boston Red Sox' Double-A affiliate in the Eastern League. In January 2019, he was named manager of the Lowell Spinners, Boston's Low-A affiliate in the New York–Penn League. In January 2021, following MLB's realignment of the minor leagues, he was named manager of Boston's Single-A affiliate, the Salem Red Sox.

=== San Diego Padres ===
After managing Salem for two seasons, Montz left the Red Sox organization in October 2022. In January 2023, he was named manager of the San Antonio Missions, the San Diego Padres' Double-A affiliate in the Texas League.

== Personal life ==
Montz, his wife, and their two daughters live in Lafayette, Louisiana.

| Preceded by Corey Wimberly | Lowell Spinners manager 2019–2020 | Succeeded by Franchise discontinued |
| Preceded by Corey Wimberly | Salem Red Sox manager 2021–2022 | Succeeded by Liam Carroll |
| Preceded by Phillip Wellman | San Antonio Missions manager 2023–2025 | Succeeded by Chris Tremie |
