= Lowell Spinners =

Collegiate baseball team in Massachusetts

Logo
Cap insignia

Information
- League: Futures Collegiate Baseball League (2026–present)
- Location: Lowell, Massachusetts, U.S.
- Ballpark: Edward A. LeLacheur Park (1998–2020, 2026–present); Stoklosa Alumni Field (1996–1997)
- Founded: 1996 (professional); 2025 (collegiate)
- Folded: 2020 (professional)
- Division championships: 2008; 2009; 2016; 2019
- Former league: New York–Penn League (1996–2020)
- Colors: Red, white, baby blue
- Mascot: Collegiate: Canaligator, Bobbie Spooligan; Professional: Canaligator, Allie-Gator, Millie-Gator
- Ownership: Marc Deschenes
- General manager: Marc Deschenes (chief baseball officer)
- Website: lowellspinners.com

The Lowell Spinners are an amateur baseball team based in Lowell, Massachusetts, that began play in the summer of 2026. A former professional baseball team based in Lowell was previously known by the same name.

The professional team was founded in 1996, after the Elmira Pioneers moved to Lowell. From 1996 to 2020, the Spinners were members of Minor League Baseball's New York–Penn League (NYPL) as the Class A Short Season affiliate of the Boston Red Sox. For the 1996 and 1997 seasons, the Spinners played at Stoklosa Alumni Field; from 1998 onward, they played at Edward A. LeLacheur Park. With Major League Baseball's reorganization of the minor leagues after the 2020 season, Lowell was not selected to continue in affiliated baseball, which resulted in the team folding.

In November 2025, a revival of the Spinners name, with a new team under new ownership, was announced—the team began play in the Futures Collegiate Baseball League, a collegiate summer baseball team, in 2026.

== History ==
Lowell's heritage in organized baseball dates to 1877, when the city hosted two teams. The 1877 Lowell team played in the League Alliance and the Lowell Ladies Men were members of the 1877 New England Association. Lowell was a frequent member of the Class B New England League, but had not fielded a team in minor league baseball since 1947, when the nearby Lawrence Millionaires franchise transferred to Lowell on July 15.

After Clyde Smoll Jr. (who bought the Elmira team in 1986 and was the son of former major league pitcher Clyde Smoll) brought the team to Lowell in 1996, Drew Weber was the team owner from 1997 until June 2016, when the franchise was purchased by Dave Heller.

The Spinners set a minor-league record in the 2000 season, as they sold every home ticket for every home game. This began a streak of sold-out home games. The streak was broken on August 30, 2010, at 413 games.

On August 21, 2003, the Spinners sponsored a Jack Kerouac bobblehead giveaway. Kerouac was a Lowell native, and played football for Lowell High School. The bobblehead was accepted by Cooperstown in 2005, the first time a literary icon was accepted there. The bobbleheads were so popular that many more were made than originally intended, raised $10,000 for the Jack Kerouac Scholarship Fund. The enshrinement also made media headlines as far away as Los Angeles.

The giveaway was repeated on August 7, 2012, when the film adaptation of On the Road was released. The dolls had a bobble head as well as a "bobble arm." The bobbleheads were also available online for ordering, and as the game was sponsored by the UMass Lowell English Department, their departmental scholarships received the proceeds from the online orders. A third Kerouac bobblehead, featuring Kerouac in his Lowell High football uniform, was given out on July 25, 2013.

In 2005, the Spinners created the "Yankees Elimination Program." The team offered to pay for the uniforms of all Little League and youth softball teams in New England to change teams named after the major-league rival Yankees into Spinners. Over the next five years, 150 teams in New England made the switch. The Spinners also invited the youth teams to play at LaLecheur Park, and assisted in other fundraising initiative for those teams. In 2010, the program was limited to 75 teams on a first-come, first-served basis, and it was estimated that over $70,000 had been donated to youth baseball and softball programs through the initiative. Spinners VP and GM Tim Bawmann said, “The Yankees Elimination Promotion was originally built as a fun promotion in response to parents' stories of children losing interest in the game after facing taunts simply for playing in a Yankees uniform.”

On September 1, 2008, the Spinners reached the New York–Penn League playoffs for the first time, capturing the Stedler Division title. They were defeated in the playoffs by the Batavia Muckdogs. The Spinners reached the playoffs again in 2009, but lost to the Staten Island Yankees.

In October 2014, the Red Sox agreed to extend their player development contract with the Spinners for two more years through the 2016 season. In November 2015, the contract was extended again through the 2018 season.

In the 2016 season, the Spinners ended with a franchise-best record of 47 wins, and tied their record for home wins (25). Right fielder Tyler Hill won the NYPL batting title, and he and third baseman Bobby Dalbec became the first Spinners players to win Player of the Month awards. The Spinners won the Stedler Division title, but were swept by the Hudson Valley Renegades in the semifinals, 2–0. Pitching prospect Jason Groome made his first start for the team in the playoffs, after being promoted from the Gulf Coast League Red Sox. The team was sold to Main Street Baseball in 2016, which they owned until 2020.

In 2019, the Spinners finished first in their division, then defeated the Batavia Muckdogs (2 games to 1) in the semifinals, to advance to the league championship series against the Brooklyn Cyclones. The Spinners were defeated in the finals (2 games to 1), with Brooklyn winning the deciding third game of the series by a 4–3 score. As with all minor league teams, the Spinners did not play during 2020, due to the COVID-19 pandemic.

The mascots of the Spinners were Canaligator, Allie-Gator, and Millie-Gator. They were introduced on January 19, 1996; July 8, 1999; and Opening Day 2006, respectively.

=== 2021 restructuring of Minor League Baseball ===
After the 2019 season, Major League Baseball (MLB) proposed dramatic changes to Minor League Baseball (MiLB) that would take effect at the end of the 2020 season, following expiration of the agreement governing the MLB–MiLB relationship. MLB's proposal included reducing the number of minor league teams from 160 to 120—the Spinners were included on the list of teams that could be eliminated under the proposal.

On December 9, 2020, the Red Sox announced that they were dropping the Spinners as an affiliate, as "a reduction to 120 teams has been proposed as the standard beginning in 2021." Red Sox president Sam Kennedy stated that the Red Sox were "committed to maintaining the 24-year-long tradition of baseball in the Lowell community.” Spinners management, local government officials, and the Red Sox committed to exploring options to keep baseball in Lowell for 2021. However, at the time the minor league season began in early May 2021, no actions or plans had been announced.

=== 2026 collegiate revival ===
In November 2025, it was announced that a new team named the Spinners, operating under new ownership, would begin play as a Futures Collegiate Baseball League (FCBL) team in 2026. The collegiate team began play in early June 2026, drawing 5,100 fans at their LeLacheur Park opening game.

== Broadcasting ==
Spinners games were broadcast on Lowell talk station WCAP. For the 2007 season they were on WLLH, another Lowell AM radio station, which at the time was an ESPN Radio affiliate. The games returned to WCAP the next season.

== Yearly team records ==
Records as the Boston Red Sox affiliate in the New York–Penn League from 1996 to 2020.

Season	Division	W	L	Pct.	Division finish	League rank	Manager	Playoffs (games)
1996	McNamara	33	41	.446	3rd	9th	Billy Gardner Jr.	
1997	McNamara	38	38	.500	2nd	6th	Dick Berardino	
1998	McNamara	32	44	.421	5th	13th	Dick Berardino	
1999	McNamara	34	42	.447	6th	10th (t)	Luis Aguayo	
2000	Stedler	41	34	.547	4th	5th	Arnie Beyeler	
2001	Stedler	33	43	.434	6th	10th	Arnie Beyeler	
2002	Stedler	34	41	.453	2nd	8th	Mike Boulanger	
2003	Stedler	39	35	.527	3rd	6th	Jon Deeble (36–30); Lynn Jones (3–5)	
2004	Stedler	32	44	.421	4th	11th	Luis Alicea	
2005	Stedler	42	33	.560	2nd	5th	Luis Alicea	
2006	Stedler	39	36	.520	3rd	9th	Bruce Crabbe	
2007	Stedler	40	36	.526	2nd	5th	Gary DiSarcina	
2008	Stedler	40	33	.548	1st	5th	Gary DiSarcina	Lost to Batavia 2–1 in semifinals
2009	Stedler	45	30	.600	1st	3rd (t)	Gary DiSarcina	Lost to Staten Island 2–1 in semifinals
2010	Stedler	24	50	.324	4th	14th	Bruce Crabbe	
2011	Stedler	29	45	.392	4th	13th	Carlos Febles	
2012	Stedler	36	40	.474	2nd	6th	Bruce Crabbe	
2013	Stedler	40	33	.548	2nd	5th	Bruce Crabbe	
2014	Stedler	37	38	.493	3rd	6th	Joe Oliver	
2015	Stedler	37	39	.487	2nd	8th	Joe Oliver	
2016	Stedler	47	29	.618	1st	3rd	Iggy Suarez	Lost to Hudson Valley 2–0 in semifinals
2017	Stedler	33	42	.440	4th	11th	Iggy Suarez	
2018	Stedler	37	38	.493	3rd	9th	Corey Wimberly	
2019	Stedler	42	34	.553	1st	4th	Luke Montz	Defeated Batavia 2–1 in semifinals Lost to Brooklyn 2–1 in final
2020	Stedler	Season cancelled due to COVID-19 pandemic					Luke Montz	

== Notable alumni ==
Select alumni are listed in this section; a full list of Spinners players who appeared in the major leagues, with their debut dates, was maintained on the team website.

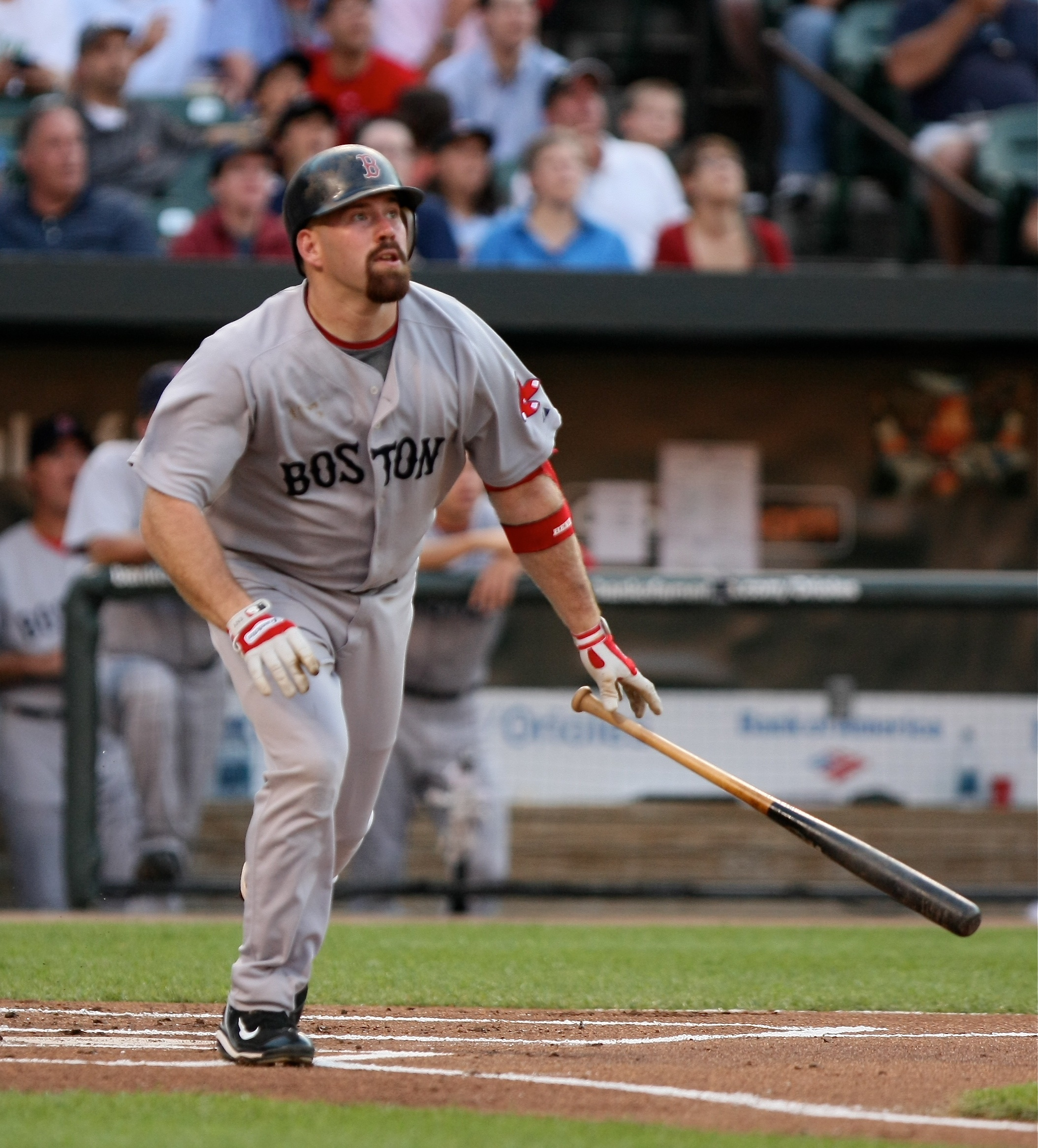
Kevin Youkilis broke into pro baseball with the 2001 Spinners, and batted .317 in 59 games.

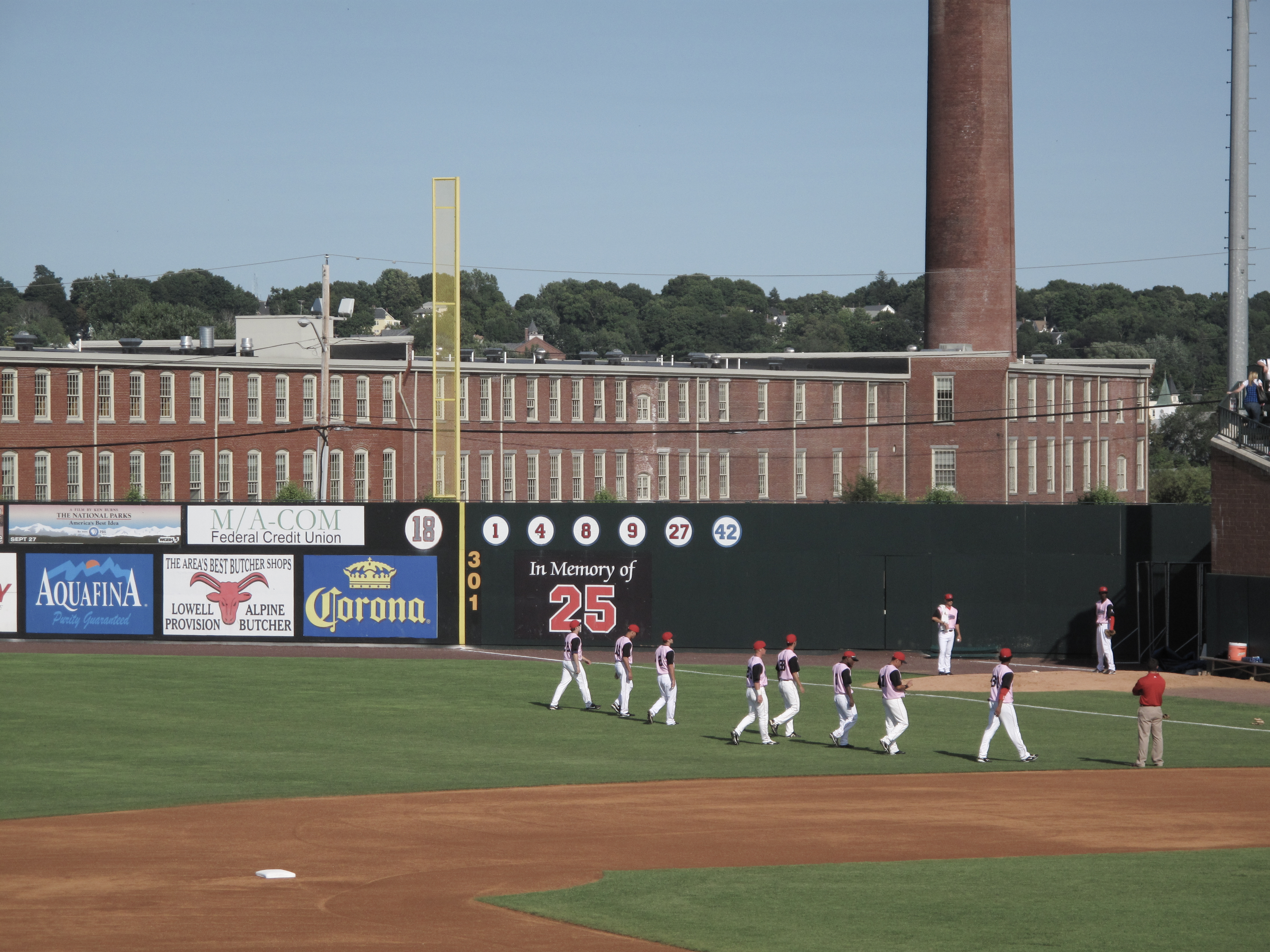
Spinners warming up at LeLacheur Park, 2009

- Abe Alvarez - on 2003 roster, received a World Series ring for spot start in 2004 for Boston.
- Mookie Betts - selected to 2016, 2017, and 2018 MLB All-Star Games with the Boston Red Sox. Won the 2018 World Series with the Boston Red Sox. 2018 American League Most Valuable Player.
- Jackie Bradley Jr. - selected to 2016 MLB All-Star Game with the Boston Red Sox. Won the 2018 World Series with the Boston Red Sox.
- Drake Britton - played for Boston Red Sox in 2013 and 2014.
- Clay Buchholz - won the 2007 and 2013 World Series with the Boston Red Sox.
- Felix Doubront - won the 2013 World Series with the Boston Red Sox.
- David Eckstein - first Spinner to play in a World Series (2002, with the Anaheim Angels), and first to be named world Series MVP (2006, with the St. Louis Cardinals).
- Jacoby Ellsbury- won the 2007 and 2013 World Series with the Boston Red Sox.
- Adam Everett - on the 1998 roster. Won a gold medal with the US Olympic Baseball Team at the 2000 Summer Olympics in Sydney.
- Shea Hillenbrand - on the 1996 roster, first Spinner to be an All-Star selection (AL, 2002 MLB All-Star Game).
- José Iglesias - American League Rookie of the Month (June 2013) with the Boston Red Sox, selected to 2015 MLB All-Star Game with the Detroit Tigers.
- Ryan Kalish - NYPL All-Star (2007) and Harry Agganis Award as Red Sox Rookie of the Year (2010)
- Ryan Lavarnway - played for the Boston Red Sox 2011–2014.
- Jed Lowrie - pre-season grand slam on April 4, 2009, was the first major league home run at Citi Field.
- Justin Masterson - 2013 MLB All-Star Game with Cleveland Indians.
- Will Middlebrooks - won the 2013 World Series with the Boston Red Sox.
- Yamaico Navarro - 2014 Korean Series winner and MVP and 2015 KBO All-Star with the Samsung Lions.
- Jonathan Papelbon - won the 2007 World Series with the Boston Red Sox.
- Hanley Ramírez - 2006 NL Rookie of the Year.
- Aníbal Sánchez - on 2004 roster, first Spinner to throw a no-hitter (2006 for the Florida Marlins). Also won the AL ERA title in 2013.
- Freddy Sanchez - won NL Batting title in 2006 as a member of the Pittsburgh Pirates.
- Wilton Veras - on 1996 roster, first Spinner to make the Red Sox roster in 1999. Former hitting coach for the Spinners.
- Alex Wilson - played for the 2013 and 2014 Boston Red Sox.
- Brandon Workman - won the 2013 and 2018 World Series with the Boston Red Sox.
- Kevin Youkilis - on the 2001 roster, second Spinners player to win a World Series ring (2004 with the Boston Red Sox), and won a second in 2007.
