= Corey Wimberly =

American baseball player and manager (born 1983)

New York Mets
- Infielder / Outfielder / Manager
- Born: October 26, 1983 (age 42); Jacksonville, Florida
- Bats: Switch Throws: Right
- Stats at Baseball Reference

Corey Leshaad Wimberly (born October 26, 1983) is an American former professional baseball infielder, outfielder, and manager who works in the minor league system of the New York Mets as an outfield coach/baserunning coordinator for the Triple-A Syracuse Mets.

Wimberly spent ten seasons playing in the minor leagues as an infielder and outfielder, including four seasons at the Triple-A level, before retiring after the 2016 season. Standing at 5 feet 8 inches (1.73 m) tall and weighing 170 pounds (77 kg), he was a switch hitter and threw right-handed. Following his playing career, Wimberly transitioned to a role within Boston's minor-league organization. Notably, during the 2018 season, he held the distinction of being one of only nine African American managers among the 160 minor-league teams.

== Playing career ==
=== Amateur ===
Wimberly attended Alcorn State University in Mississippi, where he played college baseball for the Braves. As a freshman in 2004, Wimberly earned multiple honors: Louisville Slugger Freshman All-American, SWAC Freshman and Newcomer of the Year, First-Team All-Conference, and Second-Team All-Blackcollegebaseball.com. After batting .420 in 42 games in 2004, he hit .462 in 38 games in 2005.

=== Professional ===
Wimberly was selected by the Colorado Rockies in the sixth round of the 2005 MLB draft; he signed with the Rockies, receiving a signing bonus of $145,000. Wimberly played in the Rockies' farm system from 2005 through 2008, reaching as high as Double-A. In February 2009, he was traded to the Oakland Athletics for Matt Murton. With Oakland, Wimberly spent most of 2009 in Double-A, batting .296 in 70 games, and all of 2010 in Triple-A, batting .284 in 135 games.

In December 2010, Wimberly was traded to the Indianapolis Indians, Triple-A affiliate of the Pittsburgh Pirates. With Indianapolis during the 2011 season, he hit .238 in 56 games, spending three stints on the disabled list. In November 2011, he elected to become a free agent. In December 2011, Wimberly signed with the New York Mets and was assigned to their Triple-A team, the Buffalo Bisons. In 39 games with Buffalo he hit .301, while spending nearly two months on the disabled list. In November 2012, he again elected to become a free agent.

In April 2013, Wimberly joined the Gwinnett Braves, Triple-A affiliate of the Atlanta Braves, where he hit .234 in 25 games. The Braves released him at the end of May. In June, he joined the Pensacola Blue Wahoos, Double-A affiliate of the Cincinnati Reds. He hit .260 in 59 games for Pensacola. In November 2013, he again elected to become a free agent. In December 2013, Wimberly signed with the Minnesota Twins, and was assigned to the Double-A New Britain Rock Cats. During the 2014 season, he hit .252 in 72 games for New Britain, and additionally played in several Gulf Coast League games while rehabilitating from an injury.

Overall, in 10 minor league seasons, Wimberly batted .289 with 12 home runs and 253 RBIs in 820 games. He played games at all infield positions except first base, and at all outfield positions. He stole 50 or more bases in a season three times, including 59 with the Double-A Tulsa Drillers in 2008.

Wimberly finished his playing career with Leones de Yucatán of the Mexican League during the 2015 and 2016 seasons, batting .340 and .338, respectively.

== Coaching career ==
=== Boston Red Sox ===
Following his playing career, Wimberly joined the Boston Red Sox organization in 2017 as assistant manager for the Single-A Greenville Drive. In January 2018, Wimberly was named manager of Boston's Low-A affiliate, the Lowell Spinners; the team finished the season with a record of 37–38. In January 2019, Wimberly was promoted to manager of Boston's High-A affiliate, the Salem Red Sox; they went on to compile a 67–70 record. He was named to return to Salem in 2020, but the season was canceled due to the COVID-19 pandemic. In January 2021, Wimberly was promoted to manager of Boston's Double-A affiliate, the Portland Sea Dogs; the team posted a 67–47 record. In February 2022, Wimberly was named minor league outfield/baserunning coordinator for the Red Sox.

=== New York Mets ===
On February 5, 2025, the New York Mets hired Wimberly to serve as the outfield coach and baserunning coordinator for their Triple-A affiliate, the Syracuse Mets.

=== Managerial record ===
Year	Team (Class)	W	L	Pct.	Notes
2018	Lowell Spinners (A-)	37	38	.493	missed playoffs
2019	Salem Red Sox (A+)	67	70	.489	missed playoffs
2020	Salem Red Sox (A+)	season canceled			
2021	Portland Sea Dogs (AA)	67	47	.588	no postseason
Total		171	155	.525	

Preceded by Iggy Suarez	Lowell Spinners manager 2018	Succeeded by Luke Montz
Preceded by Joe Oliver	Salem Red Sox manager 2019–2020	Succeeded by Luke Montz
Preceded by Joe Oliver	Portland Sea Dogs manager 2021	Succeeded by Chad Epperson
