= Joe Oliver (baseball) =

American baseball player (born 1965)

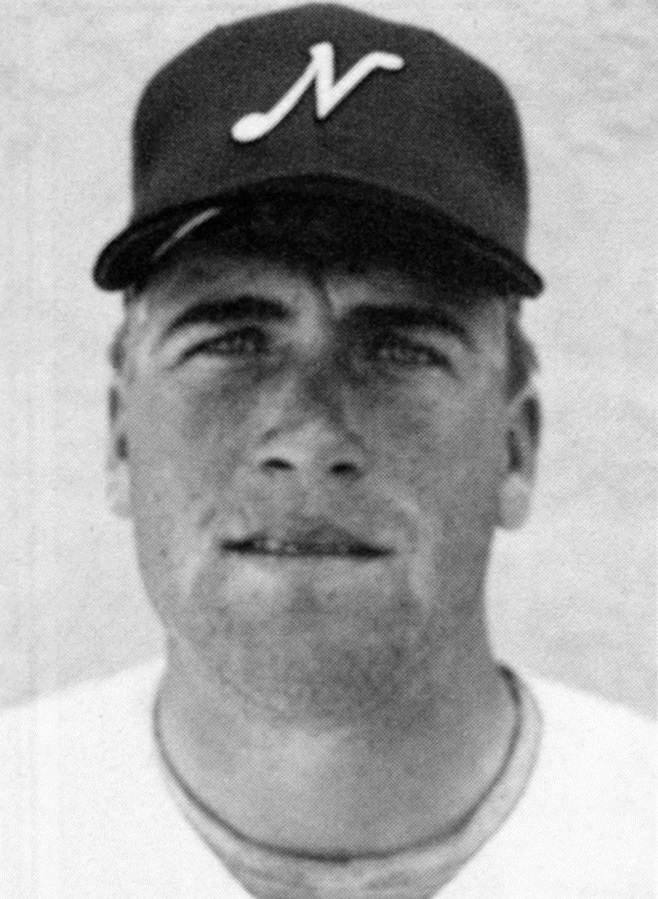
- Oliver with the Nashville Sounds in 1988
- Catcher
- Born: July 24, 1965 (age 61); Memphis, Tennessee, U.S.
- Batted: Right Threw: Right

MLB debut
- July 15, 1989, for the Cincinnati Reds

Last MLB appearance
- October 6, 2001, for the Boston Red Sox

MLB statistics
- Batting average: .247
- Home runs: 102
- Runs batted in: 476
- Stats at Baseball Reference

Teams
- Cincinnati Reds (1989–1994); Milwaukee Brewers (1995); Cincinnati Reds (1996–1997); Detroit Tigers (1998); Seattle Mariners (1998); Pittsburgh Pirates (1999); Seattle Mariners (2000); New York Yankees (2001); Boston Red Sox (2001)

Career highlights and awards
- World Series champion (1990)

Joseph Melton Oliver (born July 24, 1965) is an American former professional baseball player and manager. He played in Major League Baseball (MLB) as a catcher from 1989 to 2001, most prominently for the Cincinnati Reds, where he played in parts of eight seasons and was an integral member of the 1990 World Series winning team. During a 19-year professional playing career, Oliver played parts of 13 seasons in MLB for seven different teams. He later managed in Minor League Baseball for the Boston Red Sox organization from 2014 through 2020, and in collegiate summer baseball in 2021 and 2022. As a player, Oliver was listed at 6 feet 3 inches (1.91 m) and 215 pounds (98 kg); he batted and threw right-handed.

== Early life and amateur career ==
Oliver was born in Memphis, Tennessee.

Oliver attended Boone High School in Orlando where he was teammates with Ron Karkovice. In 1983, he was selected as the catcher on the ABCA/Rawlings High School All-America Second Team only one year after Karkovice was named the catcher on the First Team. He was inducted into Boone's hall of fame in 2004.

== Playing career ==
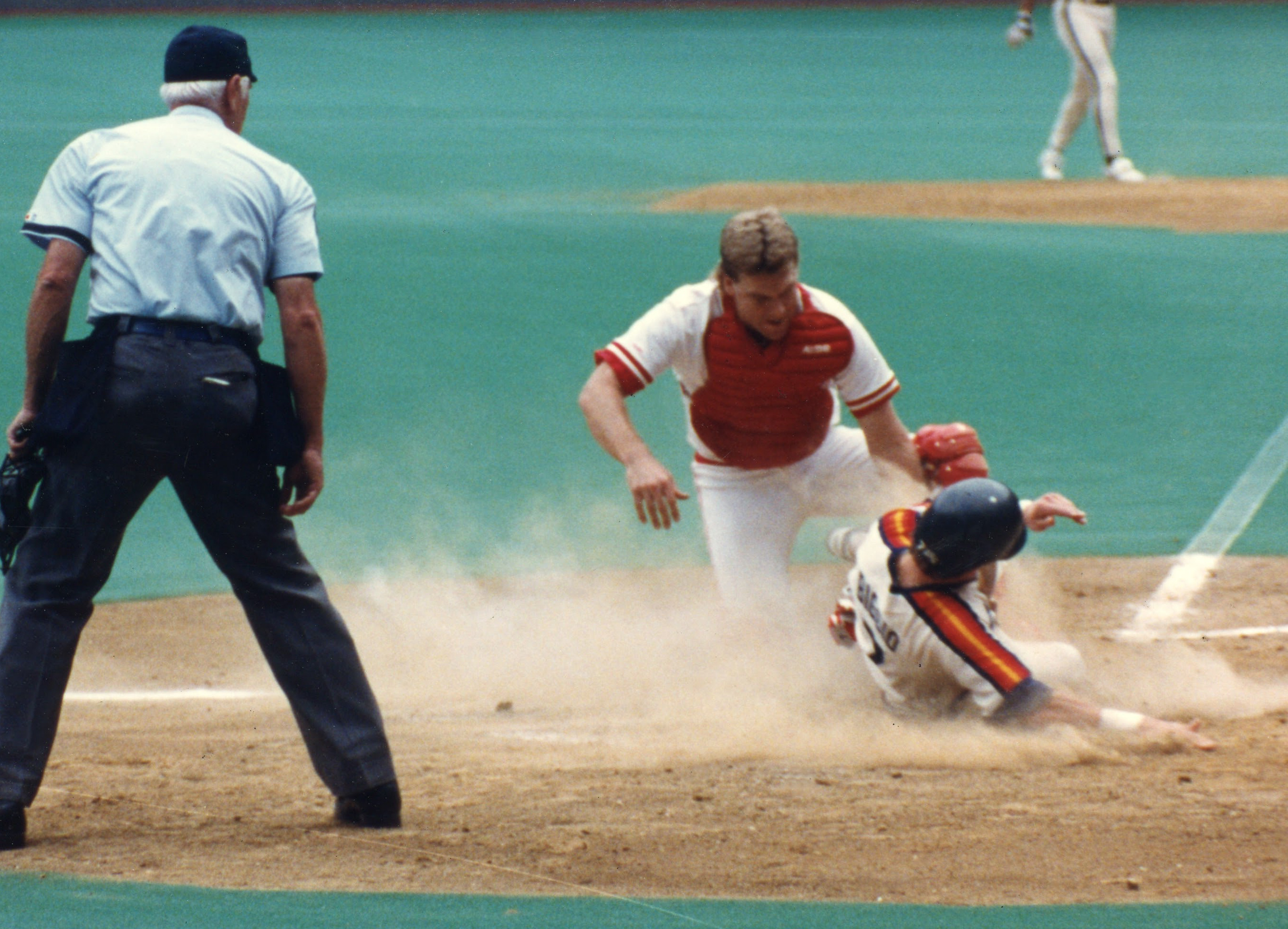
Oliver as a member of the Cincinnati Reds tags out Craig Biggio of the Houston Astros during a game at Riverfront Stadium on October 3, 1990

Drafted by the Cincinnati Reds in the second round of the 1983 MLB amateur draft, Oliver would make his Major League Baseball debut with Cincinnati on July 15, 1989, and appear in his final game on October 6, 2001. A relative rarity, in both his first and last at bats in those games, he got hits. He threw and batted right-handed, stood 6 feet 3 inches (191 cm) tall and weighed 215 pounds (98 kg; 15.4 st). Oliver was a member of the Reds team that defeated the Oakland Athletics in the 1990 World Series. He drove in Billy Bates from second base in Game 2 of that series with a hit off Dennis Eckersley to win the game and propel the Reds to the title.

Oliver had a 13-season Major League career with the Reds, Milwaukee Brewers, Detroit Tigers, Seattle Mariners, Pittsburgh Pirates, New York Yankees and Boston Red Sox. In 1,076 games played—769 of them with the Reds—he amassed 831 hits, with 174 doubles and three triples to accompany his 102 career home runs. In 1992, he led National League catchers in games caught, putouts and range factor. He was the NL player of the week August 16, 1992. He also led NL backstops in fielding percentage in 1990.

== Managing career ==
On January 31, 2014, ESPN reported via his agent, Burton Rocks, that Oliver returned from a 13-year absence from professional baseball to manage the Lowell Spinners, the Red Sox' Short-Season Class A affiliate in the New York–Penn League. Oliver took over from Bruce Crabbe, who joined the Triple-A Pawtucket Red Sox in a coaching capacity.

In two seasons at Lowell (2014–2015), Oliver led the Spinners to a 74–77 (.490) record; he was promoted to manager of the Class A-Advanced Salem Red Sox of the Carolina League for 2016 during the off-season. During his first season in Salem, his club posted the Carolina League's best record (87–52, .626), but the team fell in the opening round of the playoffs to the eventual league champions, the Myrtle Beach Pelicans, two games to one. Oliver remained with Salem through the 2018 season. Oliver's overall managerial record for the 2014–2018 period was 297–270 (.524).

Oliver was promoted to manager of the Portland Sea Dogs of the Double-A Eastern League for 2019; the team played to a 62–77 record. He was named to return as manager for 2020, but the season was canceled due to the COVID-19 pandemic. In January 2021, following MLB's realignment of the minor leagues, which resulted in a reduced number of teams, Oliver was not included in Boston's minor league managerial assignments.

In March 2021, it was announced that Oliver would manage the newly formed Bluefield Ridge Runners, a collegiate summer team in the Appalachian League.

Oliver was the manager of the Frederick Keys in the MLB Draft League for the 2022 season.

== Personal life ==
In the 1990s, Oliver was an early investor in Stix Baseball, a baseball bat manufacturer which was eventually bought by Easton.

Oliver resides in Orlando, Florida, and until 2014 coached the varsity baseball team at Bishop Moore Catholic High School. He and his wife, Kim, have four children: Dejai, Karrah, Gavin, and Lauryl.

Preceded by Bruce Crabbe	Lowell Spinners manager 2014–2015	Succeeded by Iggy Suarez
Preceded by Carlos Febles	Salem Red Sox manager 2016–2018	Succeeded by Corey Wimberly
Preceded by Darren Fenster	Portland Sea Dogs manager 2019–2020	Succeeded by Corey Wimberly
