= Carlos Febles =

Dominican baseball player and coach (born 1976)

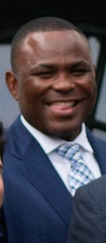
- Febles in May 2019

Toronto Blue Jays – No. 51
- Second baseman / Third base coach
- Born: May 24, 1976 (age 50); El Seibo, Dominican Republic
- Batted: Right Threw: Right

MLB debut
- September 14, 1998, for the Kansas City Royals

Last MLB appearance
- August 10, 2003, for the Kansas City Royals

MLB statistics
- Batting average: .250
- Home runs: 24
- Runs batted in: 146
- Stats at Baseball Reference

Teams
- As player: Kansas City Royals (1998–2003); As coach: Boston Red Sox (2018–2023); Toronto Blue Jays (2024–present)

Career highlights and awards
- World Series champion (2018)

Carlos Manuel Febles (Spanish: [ˈfeβles], English: /ˈfeɪblɛs/; born May 24, 1976) is a Dominican professional baseball coach and former player who is the third base coach for the Toronto Blue Jays of Major League Baseball (MLB). He played professionally from 1998 to 2003 with the Kansas City Royals, primarily as a second baseman. He threw and batted right-handed and was listed at 5 ft 11 in (1.80 m) and 185 lb (84 kg). He previously coached in MLB for the Boston Red Sox.

== Playing career ==
After attending high school in the Dominican Republic, Febles was signed by the Kansas City Royals in 1993 as an amateur free agent. His first season in the Royals' farm system was 1995, when he played for the rookie league Gulf Coast League Royals. He played in Class A in 1996, Class A-Advanced in 1997, and Double-A in 1998. He was a late season call-up for the Royals in 1998, making his MLB debut on September 14 against the Oakland Athletics, recording a hit in his first MLB at bat. In 11 MLB games with the 1998 Royals, Febles batted 10-for-25 (.400).

Febles had a strong MLB rookie year in 1999, receiving early consideration as a potential Rookie of the Year candidate, and displaying strong defensive skills. Febles and fellow rookie Carlos Beltrán were nicknamed Dos Carlos (two Carlos) in Kansas City. Through mid-June, Febles was batting .286; his hitting then cooled off, and he finished the season with a .256 average, as Beltrán went on to win the American League Rookie of the Year award.

Febles batted a career-high .257 in 2000, then batted no higher than .245 the next three seasons. He was designated for assignment by the Royals in August 2003, and ended his playing career in 2004 with the Triple-A Pawtucket Red Sox, where he batted .257 in 68 games.

In 506 MLB games played, all with Kansas City, Febles batted .250 while collecting 414 hits, including 65 doubles, 18 triples and 24 home runs. He ranks third in career starts at second base for the Royals, with 454.

== Coaching career ==
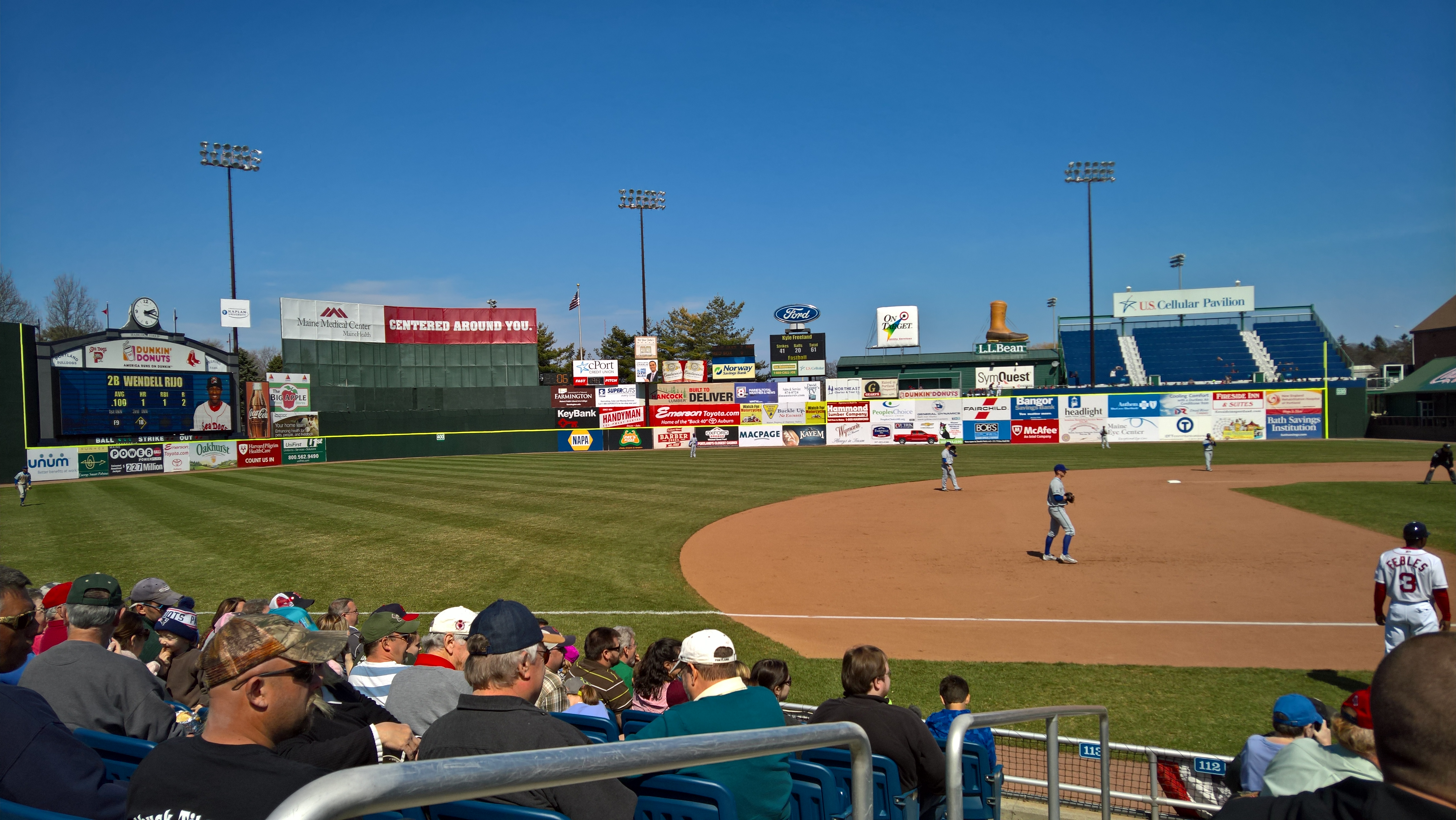
Febles (far right) coaching with the Portland Sea Dogs in 2016

In 2007, Febles began a long stint as a coach or manager in the Boston Red Sox organization. He served as a hitting coach with the Lowell Spinners in 2007, the Lancaster JetHawks in 2008, and the Salem Red Sox in 2009 and 2010. He then was named the 2011 manager of the Spinners, the Red Sox' Short-Season A New York–Penn League farm club. After one season, Febles was promoted to manage the Greenville Drive, the Red Sox' affiliate in the Class A South Atlantic League and then rehired for 2013. Another promotion followed when Febles was appointed manager of the 2014 Salem Red Sox, Boston's Class A Carolina League affiliate. Febles led the Red Sox to a 68–68 record and a berth in the Carolina League playoffs, where they were defeated by the Myrtle Beach Pelicans, two games to one, in the opening round. Febles was reappointed as Salem's pilot for 2015, and led them to a 66–73 mark. He then was promoted to manager of the Double-A Portland Sea Dogs for 2016. In 2017, Febles spent his second consecutive year as the Sea Dogs' skipper. Through 2017, his win-loss record as a manager was 400–504 (.442).

Febles was named third base coach for the major-league Red Sox on November 2, 2017, and was in that role when the team won the 2018 World Series. He returned as Boston's third base coach for the 2019 season, but had to yield his coaching duties to assistant hitting coach Andy Barkett during June, due to pain in his right foot. Febles was dismissed by the Red Sox following the 2023 season. On November 7, 2023, Febles was hired to be the third base coach for the Toronto Blue Jays.

== Personal life ==
Febles and his wife, Nedelin, have a son and a daughter. He resides in La Romana, Dominican Republic during the offseason.

Preceded by Bruce Crabbe	Lowell Spinners manager 2011	Succeeded by Bruce Crabbe
Preceded by Billy McMillon	Greenville Drive manager 2012–2013	Succeeded by Darren Fenster
Preceded by Billy McMillon	Salem Red Sox manager 2014–2015	Succeeded by Joe Oliver
Preceded by Billy McMillon	Portland Sea Dogs manager 2016–2017	Succeeded by Darren Fenster
Preceded by Brian Butterfield	Boston Red Sox third base coach 2018–2023	Succeeded by Kyle Hudson
Preceded by Luis Rivera	Toronto Blue Jays third base coach 2024–present	Succeeded by Incumbent
