= Ken Macha =

American baseball player and manager (born 1950)

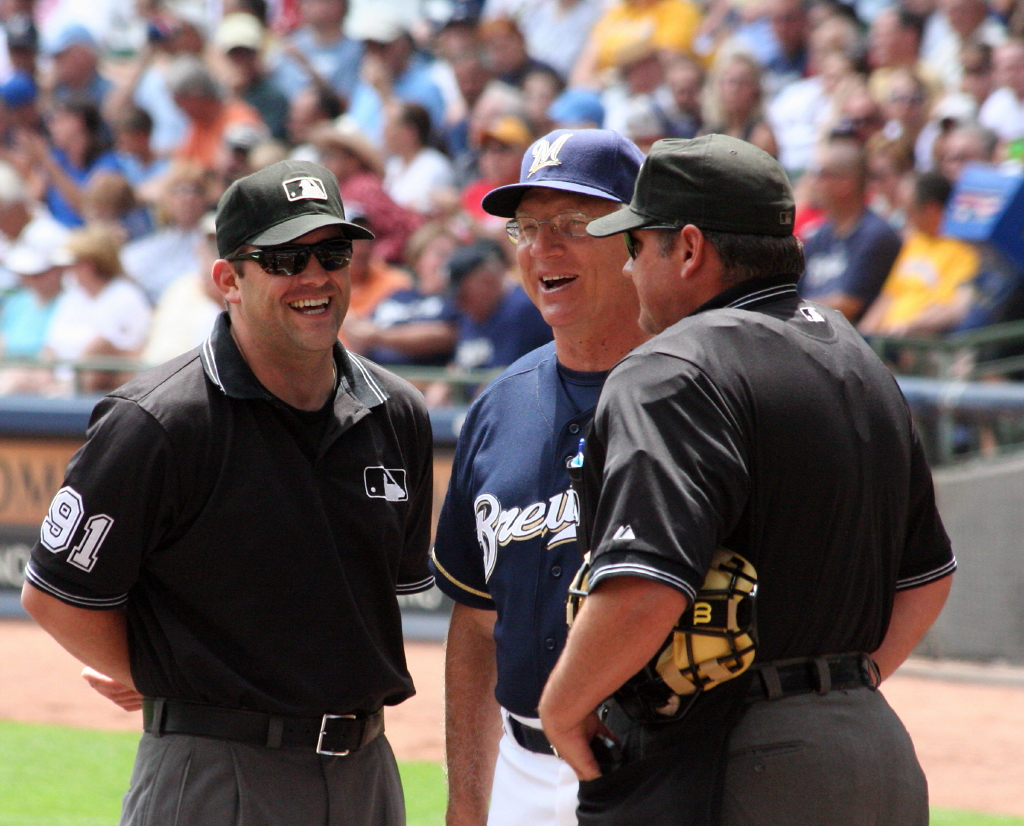
- Macha (center) with the Milwaukee Brewers in 2009
- Third baseman / Coach / Manager
- Born: September 29, 1950 (age 76); Monroeville, Pennsylvania, U.S.
- Batted: Right Threw: Right

Professional debut
- MLB: April 12, 1974, for the Pittsburgh Pirates
- NPB: April 4, 1982, for the Chunichi Dragons

Last appearance
- MLB: September 30, 1981, for the Toronto Blue Jays
- NPB: September 19, 1985, for the Chunichi Dragons

MLB statistics
- Batting average: .258
- Home runs: 1
- Runs batted in: 35
- Managerial record: 525–447
- Winning %: .540

NPB statistics
- Batting average: .304
- Home runs: 82
- Runs batted in: 268
- Stats at Baseball Reference
- Managerial record at Baseball Reference

Teams
- As player: Pittsburgh Pirates (1974, 1977–1978); Montreal Expos (1979–1980); Toronto Blue Jays (1981); Chunichi Dragons (1982–1985); As manager: Oakland Athletics (2003–2006); Milwaukee Brewers (2009–2010); As coach: Montreal Expos (1986–1991); California Angels (1992–1994); Oakland Athletics (1999–2002)

Kenneth Edward Macha (/ˈmɑːkə/ MAH-kə; born September 29, 1950) is an American former professional baseball player, coach, and manager. He played in Major League Baseball (MLB) and Nippon Professional Baseball (NPB) as a third baseman between 1974 and 1985. He worked in MLB as a coach between 1986 and 2002 then as a manager for the Oakland Athletics and Milwaukee Brewers between 2003 and 2010. Following his baseball career, Macha worked for Root Sports Pittsburgh (now Sportsnet Pittsburgh) as a postgame analyst in the mid-2010's.

== Playing career ==
Macha graduated from Gateway High School in Monroeville, a suburb of Pittsburgh, and played college baseball at the University of Pittsburgh. He was selected by Pittsburgh in the sixth round of the 1972 Major League Baseball draft. He was the Eastern League batting champion in 1974 with the Thetford Mines Pirates.

Macha made his major-league debut on September 14, 1974, going 1-for-1 in a 17–2 Pirates loss to the Montreal Expos at Jarry Park. He is one of only a handful of players to play for both the Expos and Toronto Blue Jays, Canada's two major league franchises. His final major-league appearance was on September 30, 1981, in a 3–0 Blue Jays loss to the Oakland Athletics. Macha hit a combined .258 in 180 major-league games.

Macha subsequently spent four years playing in Japan with the Chunichi Dragons, from 1982 until 1985.

== Coaching career ==
Macha retired as a player in 1985 and joined the Expos as a major league coach in 1986. He spent six seasons at Montreal before moving to coaching for the California Angels at bullpen and third base. He then joined the Boston Red Sox organization in fall 1994.

The 1997 season marked Macha's first as manager of the Triple-A Pawtucket Red Sox. In the previous two seasons he managed the Double-A Trenton Thunder to first-place finishes, including a league-best 86–56 record and another division crown in 1996. He was chosen to manage the American League affiliates in the Double-A All-Star Game.

Macha then joined the Oakland Athletics as bench coach, serving under former Pirates teammate Art Howe from 1999 through 2002. In March 2002, the A's denied permission for the Red Sox to contact Macha about their managerial vacancy. Boston then hired Grady Little, while Macha spent a final season as a coach until he was tapped to succeed Howe, who became manager of the New York Mets after the season ended.

Macha's pact with Oakland expired on October 8, 2005, and negotiations broke down between the two sides trying to reach a deal and Macha was out of a job. Six days later, after coming close to a deal with the Pittsburgh Pirates, Macha reached a deal with the Athletics and became their manager once again. He led them to a division title and a sweep over the Minnesota Twins in the ALDS to advance to the American League Championship Series, which was the team's first playoff series victory since 1990. However, the Athletics were swept by the Detroit Tigers. On October 16, 2006, he was fired by general manager Billy Beane, on the same day ESPN reported Macha had a tenuous relationship with the players, particularly with injured players (he referred to two placed on the disabled list as "non-entities"). The Oakland Athletics would not win another playoff series until 2020.

After he was dismissed from his managerial position in Oakland, the Seattle Mariners offered Macha a position as bench coach to manager Mike Hargrove, but Macha refused, citing his desire to take a year off. He was then offered a position as a senior adviser to Mariners GM Bill Bavasi. However, in April 2007, Macha accepted a part-time position as a pre- and post-game analyst for New England Sports Network, which telecasts Boston Red Sox games.

On October 30, 2008, the Milwaukee Brewers announced Macha as the Brewers' new manager. Macha's Brewers finished below .500 in both 2009 and 2010. On October 3, 2010, it was confirmed that Macha would not return for the 2011 season.

Since 2011 Macha has been volunteering with the baseball program at Westmoreland County Community College in Youngwood, Pennsylvania.

== Personal life ==
Macha is a first cousin to Hal Newhouser. In the offseason, he lived in Murrysville, Pennsylvania, with his family.

As of 2020, Macha is retired and residing in Latrobe, Pennsylvania, near his hometown of Monroeville.

== Managerial record ==
Team	Year	Regular season					Postseason			
Team	Year	Games	Won	Lost	Win %	Finish	Won	Lost	Win %	Result
OAK	2003	162	96	66	.593	1st in AL West	2	3	.400	Lost ALDS (BOS)
OAK	2004	162	91	71	.562	2nd in AL West	–	–	–	
OAK	2005	162	88	74	.543	2nd in AL West	–	–	–	
OAK	2006	162	93	69	.574	1st in AL West	3	4	.429	Lost ALCS (DET)
OAK total		648	368	280	.568		5	7	.417	
MIL	2009	162	80	82	.494	3rd in NL Central	–	–	–	
MIL	2010	162	77	85	.475	3rd in NL Central	–	–	–	
MIL total		324	157	167	.485		0	0	–	
Total		972	525	447	.540		5	7	.417	

== See also ==
Sporting positions
Preceded by Tom Runnells	Trenton Thunder manager 1995–1996	Succeeded by DeMarlo Hale
Preceded by Buddy Bailey	Pawtucket Red Sox manager 1997–1998	Succeeded by Gary Jones
Preceded by Duffy Dyer	Oakland Athletics bench coach 1999–2003	Succeeded by Terry Francona
