= Tim Murtaugh =

American baseball player (born 1943)

Timothy J. Murtaugh (born May 6, 1943 at Chester, Pennsylvania) is an American former professional baseball catcher and manager. The son of former Pittsburgh Pirates infielder and manager Danny Murtaugh, Tim fashioned a 13-year career in the Pirates' farm system (1965–1977), six of them as an active player, and seven as a manager or playing manager.

The 5 foot, 11 inch (1.8 m), 195 pound (89 kg) Murtaugh signed with the Pirates after graduating from the College of the Holy Cross. A switch hitter, he threw right-handed. The Associated Press called him a "bona fide major league prospect". After his playing career peaked with five games at the Triple-A level with the 1968 Columbus Jets of the International League, he became a skipper in the Pittsburgh minor league organization, where he won championships in the Carolina League (1972) and Eastern League (1974). He spent 1½ seasons managing at the Triple-A level with the 1976 Charleston Charlies and the 1977 Columbus Clippers. As a player, he appeared in 513 games and batted .259, with 13 home runs.

After leaving the game after the '77 campaign, Murtaugh worked in insurance and successfully entered local politics, serving as a member of the board of commissioners of Ridley Township, Pennsylvania, and multiple terms on the Delaware County Council.
