= List of New York Mets coaches =

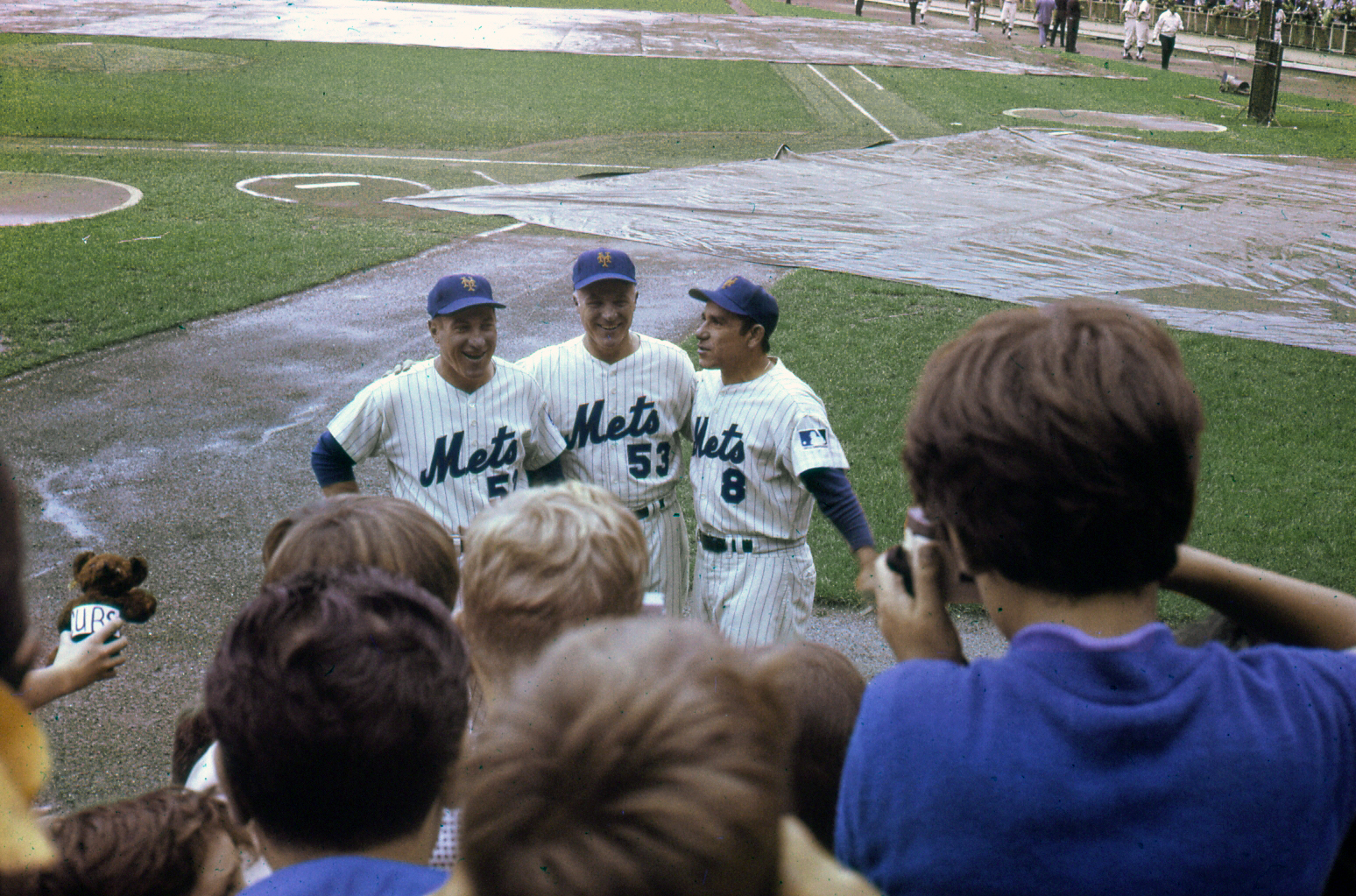
Joe Pignatano, Eddie Yost, and Yogi Berra, coaches on the 1969 New York Mets World Series team

The following is a list of coaches, including position, year(s) of service(s), who appeared at least in one game for the New York Mets National League franchise.

== Bench coach ==
- Yogi Berra: 1965–1971
- Willie Mays: 1974–1979
- Doc Edwards: 1990–1991
- Bobby Wine: 1993–1996
- Rafael Landestoy: 1996
- Bruce Benedict: 1997–1999
- Cookie Rojas: 2000
- Bobby Floyd: 2001
- Tom Robson: 2002
- Don Baylor: 2003–2004
- Jerry Manuel: 2005–2008
- Ken Oberkfell: 2008, 2011
- Sandy Alomar Sr.: 2009
- Dave Jauss: 2010
- Bob Geren: 2012–2015
- Dick Scott: 2016–2017
- Gary DiSarcina: 2018
- Jim Riggleman: 2019
- Hensley Meulens: 2020
- Dave Jauss
- Glenn Sherlock
- Eric Chavez
- John Gibbons

== Hitting coach ==
- Phil Cavarretta
- Dick Sisler
- Deron Johnson
- Jim Frey
- Bill Robinson
- Mike Cubbage
- Tommy McCraw
- Tom Robson
- Mickey Brantley
- Dave Engle
- Chris Chambliss
- Denny Walling
- Don Baylor
- Rick Down
- Howard Johnson
- Dave Hudgens
- Lamar Johnson
- Kevin Long
- Pat Roessler
- Chili Davis
- Hugh Quattlebaum
- Eric Chavez
- Jeremy Barnes

== Pitching coach ==
- Red Ruffing
- Ernie White
- Mel Harder
- Warren Spahn
- Harvey Haddix
- Rube Walker
- Bob Gibson
- Bill Monbouquette
- Mel Stottlemyre
- Greg Pavlick
- Bob Apodaca
- Dave Wallace (baseball)
- Charlie Hough
- Vern Ruhle
- Rick Peterson
- Dan Warthen
- Dave Eiland
- Phil Regan (baseball)
- Jeremy Hefner

== First base coach ==
- Cookie Lavagetto
- Solly Hemus
- Sheriff Robinson
- Yogi Berra
- Roy McMillan
- Willie Mays
- Denny Sommers
- Joe Pignatano
- Dick Sisler
- Deron Johnson
- Bud Harrelson
- Frank Howard (baseball)
- Bill Robinson (outfielder)
- Mike Cubbage
- Tom Spencer (baseball)
- Barry Foote
- Mookie Wilson
- Gary Pettis
- Sandy Alomar Sr.
- Howard Johnson (baseball)
- Rickey Henderson
- Tom Nieto
- Luis Aguayo
- Luis Alicea
- Razor Shines
- Tom Goodwin
- Ruben Amaro Jr.
- Glenn Sherlock
- Tony DeFrancesco
- Tony Tarasco
- Wayne Kirby
- Antoan Richardson

== Third base coach ==
- Solly Hemus
- Cookie Lavagetto
- Wes Westrum
- Whitey Herzog
- Salty Parker
- Eddie Yost
- Tom Burgess
- Dal Maxvill
- Chuck Cottier
- Frank Howard
- Bobby Valentine
- Bud Harrelson
- Sam Perlozzo
- Chuck Hiller
- Mike Cubbage
- Cookie Rojas
- John Stearns
- Matt Galante
- Manny Acta
- Sandy Alomar Sr.
- Razor Shines
- Chip Hale
- Tim Teufel
- Glenn Sherlock
- Gary Disarcina
- Joey Cora
- Mike Sarbaugh

== Bullpen coach ==
- Sheriff Robinson
- Joe Pignatano: 1968–1981
- Gene Dusan
- Vern Hoscheit
- Greg Pavlick
- Dave LaRoche
- Steve Swisher
- Randy Niemann
- Al Jackson
- Rick Waits
- Bobby Floyd (baseball)
- Guy Conti
- Ricky Bones
- Craig Bjornson
- Dom Chiti
- José Rosado

== Others ==
- Rogers Hornsby, general coach
- Clyde McCullough, general coach
- Bob Gibson, attitude coach
- Luis Rojas
- Pat Roessler
- Danny Barnes, information coach
- Eric Hinske, assistant hitting
