= Natera (surname) =

Natera is a surname. Notable people with the surname include:

- Cleyvis Natera, Dominican-born American novelist, educator
- Luis Natera (born 1966), Dominican baseball coach
- Ramón Natera, Dominican guerrilla fighter
- Samy Natera Jr., Mexican baseball player
