= Charlie Manuel =

American baseball player and manager (born 1944)

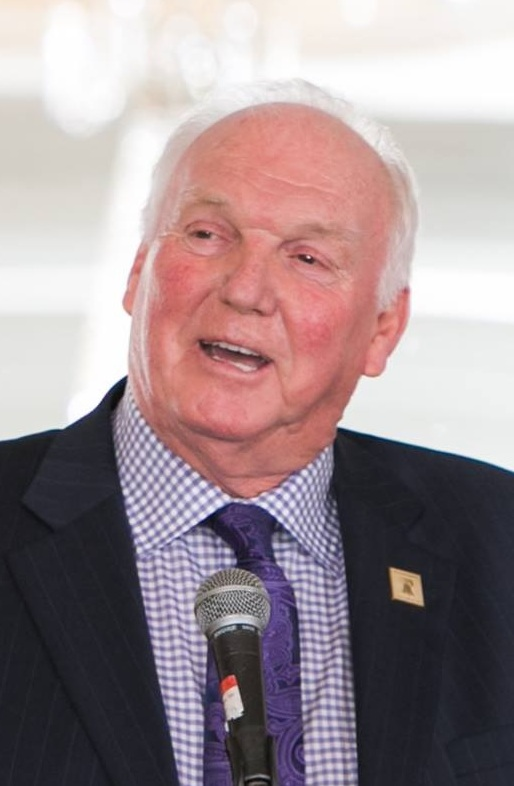
- Manuel in 2018
- Left fielder / Manager
- Born: January 4, 1944 (age 82); Northfork, West Virginia, U.S.
- Batted: Left Threw: Right

Professional debut
- MLB: April 8, 1969, for the Minnesota Twins
- NPB: April 3, 1976, for the Yakult Swallows

Last appearance
- MLB: September 21, 1975, for the Los Angeles Dodgers
- NPB: October 12, 1981, for the Yakult Swallows

MLB statistics
- Batting average: .198
- Home runs: 4
- Runs batted in: 43
- Managerial record: 1,000–826
- Winning %: .548

NPB statistics
- Batting average: .303
- Home runs: 189
- Runs batted in: 491
- Stats at Baseball Reference
- Managerial record at Baseball Reference

Teams
- As player: Minnesota Twins (1969–1972); Los Angeles Dodgers (1974–1975); Yakult Swallows (1976–1978); Kintetsu Buffaloes (1979–1980); Yakult Swallows (1981); As manager: Cleveland Indians (2000–2002); Philadelphia Phillies (2005–2013); As coach: Cleveland Indians (1988–1989, 1994–1999); Philadelphia Phillies (2019)

Career highlights and awards
- NPB: Japan Series champion (1978); Pacific League MVP (1979); 3× Best Nine Award (1978–1980); MLB: World Series champion (2008); Philadelphia Phillies Wall of Fame

Charles Fuqua Manuel Jr. (born January 4, 1944) is an American former professional baseball player, coach, and manager. During his playing career, he appeared over parts of six Major League Baseball (MLB) seasons for the Minnesota Twins and Los Angeles Dodgers, before playing another six seasons in Nippon Professional Baseball with the Yakult Swallows and Kintetsu Buffaloes. Over four successive seasons in NPB, Manuel hit at least .312 with 37 home runs each season and won the 1979 Pacific League Most Valuable Player Award.

After his playing career, he coached and managed the Cleveland Indians and managed the Philadelphia Phillies, winning the 2008 World Series over the Tampa Bay Rays and the 2009 National League Championship Series over the Los Angeles Dodgers. He was inducted to the Philadelphia Baseball Wall of Fame in 2014.

On August 13, 2019, Manuel replaced John Mallee as hitting coach for the Phillies for the remainder of the season.

== Early life ==
Although Manuel was born in Northfork, West Virginia, his family was actually living in Virginia at that time and all throughout his childhood. He was born in an automobile while his mother, June, was visiting her mother. Manuel's father, Charles Sr., was a Pentecostal preacher, and the family lived in Wythe and Grayson Counties in Virginia until they settled in Buena Vista, Virginia, when Charlie, the third of 11 children and the oldest son, was 12.

Manuel became a four-sport star at Parry McCluer High School in Buena Vista, playing baseball, football, basketball, and track and field, captaining the baseball and basketball teams. His first love was basketball and he had received scholarship offers in that sport, but his plans and his life would dramatically change just before his high school graduation.

In April 1963, Manuel's father died by suicide due to being severely ill with diabetes and heart problems. Leaving behind a suicide note, he asked that Charlie – who was already married with a child – take care of his mother and siblings. He turned down his basketball scholarship offers, and an academic scholarship to the University of Pennsylvania, to consider offers from the Pittsburgh Pirates, Detroit Tigers, Minnesota Twins, and New York Yankees, ultimately signing with the Twins out of high school in 1963 for $30,000 ($320,000 in current dollar terms).

== Playing career ==
=== Minor league career ===
In 1971, Manuel hit .372/.462/.764 for the Portland Beavers, leading the Pacific Coast League in each category. In 1974, he batted .329/.433/.600 with 30 home runs and 102 RBIs for the Albuquerque Dukes in the Pacific Coast League. Over 11 seasons in the minor leagues, in 3,430 at bats, Manuel batted .290/.374/.483 with 133 home runs and 624 RBIs.

=== Major league career ===
Manuel played from 1969 to 1972 with the Minnesota Twins and in 1974 and 1975 with the Los Angeles Dodgers, primarily as a pinch-hitter and left fielder. His earliest Topps baseball cards listed him as "Chuck" Manuel. He batted .198 in 384 at bats.

=== Japanese baseball ===
Manuel's baseball career took off when he left the United States to play in Japan. Wildly popular for his tenacious style of play and his power-hitting abilities, Manuel was dubbed "Aka-Oni" (The Red Devil) by fans and teammates. He was also nicknamed "Uncle Chuck", most likely in reference to some of his Topps cards.

In 1977, he hit .316/.403/.690 (2nd in the league) with 42 home runs (3rd) and 97 runs batted in (5th), helping the Central League's Yakult Swallows reach second place for the first time in franchise history. In 1978, he hit .312/.372/.596 with 39 homers (3rd in the league) and 103 RBIs (5th), powering the Swallows to their first pennant and the Japan Championship Series.

Playing for the Pacific League's Kintetsu Buffaloes, Manuel hit 25 home runs in the first eight weeks of the 1979 season. In a game against the Lotte Orions on June 19, 1979, he was hit by a pitch from Soroku Yagisawa. The pitch broke Manuel's jaw in six places. He was wearing a dental bridge, as a result of an earlier accident in the minor leagues. There was nothing for doctors to wire together, so they inserted three metal plates in his head and removed nerves from his face. Manuel was discharged from the hospital after six weeks and immediately began playing again, against the advice of doctors and worried family. The Buffaloes were struggling to stay in the Pacific League lead and had never won a pennant. To protect his jaw, Manuel wore a helmet equipped with a football facemask. He wore the helmet for the first few games but stopped using it because it obscured his vision at the plate. He finished the 1979 season with 37 home runs to win the home run title. He led Kintetsu to its first pennant win. He was voted the Most Valuable Player, the first American to receive the honor since 1964, hitting .324/.434 (2nd in the league)/.712 (leading the league) with 65 walks (2nd), 37 home runs (leading the league) and 94 RBIs (5th).

A year later, Manuel returned to lead Kintetsu to the second-half championship and the pennant. He finished the season hitting .325 (5th in the league)/.400/.673 (leading the league), with 88 runs (4th), 48 home runs (leading the league), and 129 RBIs (leading the league). It was one of the best seasons for an American player in Japan up to that point. However, his Buffaloes would fall to the Hiroshima Carp in the Japan Series once again.

In 1981, he returned to the Yakult Swallows after being released by Kintetsu over contract negotiations.

Manuel finished his successful run in Japan with a .303 career average, 189 home runs, and 491 RBIs. He was considered one of the best imported baseball players to Japan in those days, along with brothers Leron and Leon Lee and Randy Bass.

During his time in Japan, Manuel learned to speak Japanese. The language skill and experience in Japan were useful back in the U.S. for managing players such as So Taguchi and Tadahito Iguchi.

== Coaching career ==
=== Minor league manager ===
Ultimately, injuries, including his beaning in Japan, cut Manuel's playing days short. He returned to the United States to work as a scout for the Minnesota Twins organization before turning to coaching. As a minor league manager for nine years in the Twins' (1983–1987) and Cleveland Indians' (1990–1993) farm systems, Manuel compiled a 610–588 (.509) record, winning the Pacific Coast League and International League championships in his final two seasons (1992–93). He was named Manager of the Year three times (1984, 1992, 1993) and managed the IL All-Star team in 1993.

=== Cleveland Indians coach and manager ===
Manuel returned to the Majors in 1988 as the Indians' hitting coach (1988–1989, 1994–1999), where under his tutelage, the Tribe led the American League in runs three times (1994–1995, 1999) and set a franchise record in 1999 with 1,009 runs, becoming the first team to score 1,000 runs since the 1950 Boston Red Sox. The club also led the league in home runs in 1994 and 1995.

From 2000 to 2002, he served as the Indians' manager, becoming the 37th manager in Indians history.

The 2000 season had a 44–42 start, but Manuel's squad caught fire after the All Star break and went 46–30 the rest of the way to finish 90–72. The team had one of the league's best offenses that year and a defense that yielded three gold gloves. However, they ended up five games behind the Chicago White Sox in the Central division and missed the wild card by one game to the Seattle Mariners.

2001 saw a return to the postseason. After the departures of Manny Ramírez and Sandy Alomar Jr., the Indians signed Ellis Burks and former MVP Juan González, who helped the team win the Central division with a 91–71 record. One of the highlights came on August 5, when the Indians completed the biggest comeback in MLB History. Cleveland rallied to close a 14–2 deficit in the seventh inning to defeat the Seattle Mariners 15–14 in 11 innings. The Mariners, who won an MLB record-tying 116 games that season, had a strong bullpen, and Manuel had already pulled many of his starters with the game seemingly out of reach.

Seattle and Cleveland would eventually meet in the ALDS, with the Indians taking a 2 games to 1 lead, then losing two straight to drop the series 3 games to 2. Following the season, Manuel received a single third place vote in American League Manager of the Year voting, finishing in a tie for sixth.

The 2002 season started with eleven wins in their first twelve games, but the team sputtered thereafter, finishing April with a .500 record before spiraling with losing records in each of the next three months. He was fired as manager of the Cleveland Indians on July 11, 2002, with the team at 39–47, over a contract dispute with general manager Mark Shapiro, who Manuel said "wasn't totally honest". Manuel finished his time as Indians' manager with a record of 220 wins and 190 losses.

=== Philadelphia Phillies manager ===
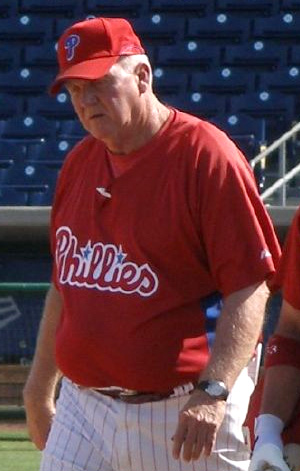
Manuel managing the Phillies in 2006

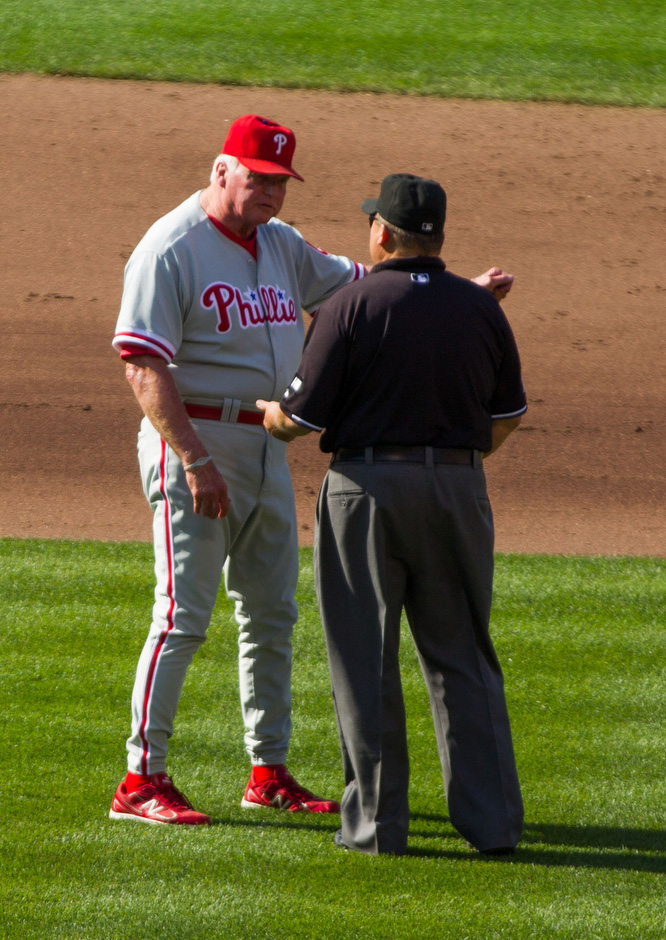
Charlie Manuel argues a call with an umpire

==== 2004–06 ====
Shortly after he was fired as manager for the Cleveland Indians, Manuel was hired by the Philadelphia Phillies as special assistant to the general manager. After the 2004 season, Manuel was hired as the club's 51st manager, replacing Larry Bowa. In the 2005 season, the Phillies went 88–74, only one game back of the Wild Card. Following the season, Manuel received three votes in National League Manager of the Year voting, finishing in sixth place.

In 2006, the Phillies finished just short of the playoffs once again, this time three games back of the wild card. However, the season did have certain positives that boded well for next season. Second-year slugger Ryan Howard hit a franchise-record 58 home runs, second baseman Chase Utley was named a starter in the 2006 MLB All-Star Game, and rookie pitcher Cole Hamels showed progress and the potential to one day become the club's ace. After once again just missing the playoffs, Manuel received three second-place votes in National League Manager of the Year voting, finishing in fifth place.

==== 2007 ====
The team got off to a slow start again in 2007 (in 2005, they opened at 9–12; in 2006, 6–10). They began the season with a 3–9 record and during the Phillies' post-game press conference following the team's 8–1 loss to the New York Mets on April 17, 2007, Philadelphia radio personality Howard Eskin repeatedly questioned Manuel why he did not challenge his players. Eskin, a controversial afternoon drive host on local sports-talk station WIP-610, had criticized Manuel since the manager's hiring three years earlier. The Phillies proceeded to lose two of their next three games after the confrontation before going on a five-game winning streak. After the streak, the Phillies took another step back, winning only 5 of their next 13 games. The Philles were still one game below .500 on July 19 and only four games over .500 on August 25. From August 25 through the end of the season the Phillies went 23–11 to overtake the Mets.

Manuel's Phillies battled injuries all season, including losing newly acquired pitcher Freddy García for the season. Howard, Utley, and Hamels also missed significant playing time. Hamels led the pitching staff with a 15–5 record, while Jimmy Rollins set the Major League Baseball record for at bats in a season with 716 through all 162 games played, and was named NL MVP. In a dramatic finale to the season, the Phillies captured the National League East title from the collapsing Mets, but were swept in the first round of the playoffs by the Colorado Rockies. Manuel finished second in balloting for the National League Manager of the Year Award for 2007.

==== 2008–09 ====
The 2008 season started out much like 2005 through 2007, as the Phillies once again got off to a slow start with a record of 8 wins and 10 losses. They recovered quickly after their slow start to go over the .500 mark on April 24. They peaked at 22 games over the .500 mark on the final day of the season, winning 92 games and earning 1st place in the NL East for the second consecutive year. On October 29, Manuel guided the 2008 Phillies to their second world title. It was his first World Series ring after years of close calls (including the 1997 Cleveland Indians). He was voted by fans as MLB "This Year in Baseball Awards" Manager of the Year, and finished second in balloting for the National League Manager of the Year Award for the second consecutive season. Manuel reached a contract agreement with the Phils on December 9, 2008, to keep him with the team through the 2011 season.

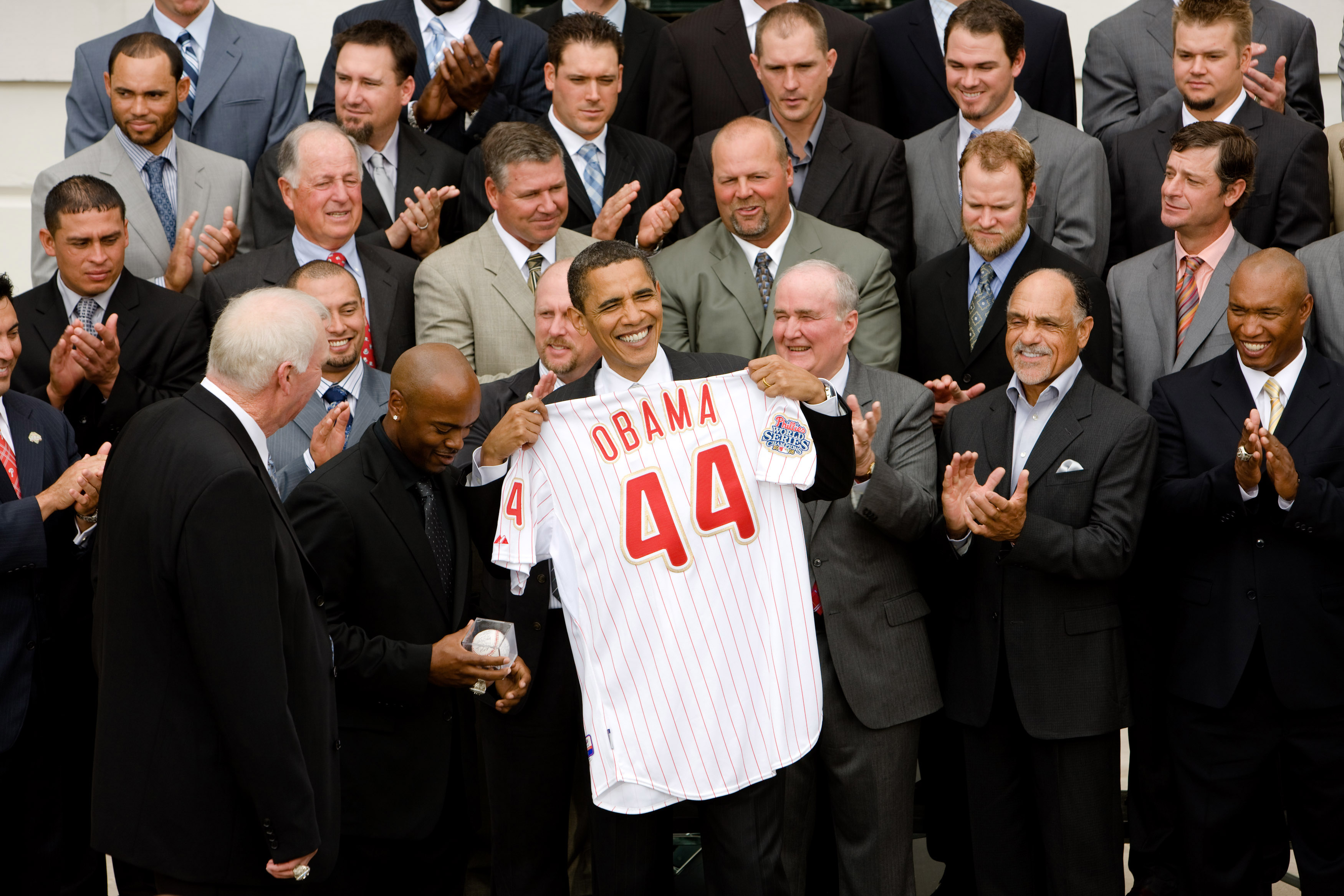
Charlie Manuel and the Phillies meet with President Barack Obama during their visit to the White House

On October 21, 2009, Manuel became the first manager in franchise history to lead the Phillies to two consecutive World Series appearances. It was the first time a National League team won back-to-back pennants since the 1995–96 Atlanta Braves. During the 2009 World Series, Manuel was criticized for not pitching Cliff Lee in Game 4, a game the Phillies eventually lost. He defended his decision by noting that Lee had never pitched on three days' rest before. Manuel finished sixth in balloting for the 2009 National League Manager of the Year Award.

==== 2010–11 ====
In 2010, Manuel managed the Phillies to their fourth consecutive NL East title. The Phillies became the third NL team in history to play in the postseason in four consecutive seasons, joining the Braves (1991–1995, excluding 1994) and the New York Giants (1921–24). The Phillies finished the season at 97–65; it was the first time in franchise history that Philadelphia had completed a season with Major League Baseball's best record. In November, the Rotary Club of Pittsburgh named Manuel the recipient of its Chuck Tanner Major League Baseball Manager of the Year Award. However, the Phillies would be eliminated by the eventual World Series champion San Francisco Giants in the NLCS. Following the season, Manuel finished fifth in balloting for the 2010 National League Manager of the Year Award, marking the sixth consecutive season in which he received votes for Manager of the Year.

In September 2011, Manuel again led the Phillies to the NL East title, their fifth consecutive in as many years, and quickest post-season clinch ever: at game #150. During the sweep of the final series against the Atlanta Braves on September 26–28, records were set. First on the 26th, with the Phillies' 4–2 victory, he became the second manager in Phillies' history to manage a team to at least 100 wins in a season, after Danny Ozark during back-to-back 101-win seasons in 1976 and 1977. The next day, with the Phillies' 7–1 victory, Manuel moved into a franchise-record tie with Gene Mauch with 645 regular-season victories. In the final game of the season with a victory in 13 innings, he led the Phillies to a franchise-record 102 regular season wins. With the victory he picked up his 646th win, setting a new Phillies' managerial record for victories and assuring that the Phillies would face the red-hot St. Louis Cardinals, who defeated them in the NLDS. Following the season, Manuel finished fourth in balloting for the 2011 National League Manager of the Year Award, marking the seventh consecutive season, and eighth (and final) time overall, in which he received votes for Manager of the Year.

==== 2012–13 ====
In 2012, he managed the Phillies to an 81–81 record. It marked the first time since 2006 the Phillies failed to reach the postseason.

In 2013, Manuel won his 1,000th game on August 12. However, Manuel did not win another game with the Phillies, and after the team lost their 15th game out of 20 after the All-Star Break, Manuel was fired on August 16. He was replaced by third-base coach Ryne Sandberg. Reaction around the league and from the Phillies fan base mostly consisted of sadness and gratitude to Manuel for his tenure. Several Phillies veterans, including Chase Utley and Cole Hamels, expressed regret and guilt, believing their lack of production led to Manuel's firing; they said that they viewed Manuel as a fatherly figure. Sandberg commented the next day, "It was a roller coaster of a day emotionally. It affected me and I think it affects the players." Manuel received praise from the media for his class in handling the situation, and sportswriters mostly exonerated him of the blame for the Phillies' performance, focusing on his not having had better players. When asked if he had enough pieces to win the last two years, he said "The last two years? No. I can straight face tell you that." He finished with a record of 780 wins and 636 losses. Of the six managers to have lasted for twelve seasons in the position in Major League Baseball, Manuel is the only one to have won 1,000 games. He is also one of just a dozen managers to have won a thousand games without having also lost a thousand as well (of those, six are in the Hall of Fame). Despite stepping down, Manuel returned to the Philles in 2019 as a senior advisor to the General Manager.

=== Philadelphia Phillies hitting coach ===
On August 13, 2019, he was hired as interim hitting coach of the Phillies, replacing John Mallee. The 75-year old Manuel held that position for the remainder of the 2019 season before returning to his advisory role at the conclusion of the campaign.

== Managerial record ==
As of November 21, 2014

Team	Year	Regular season					Postseason			
Team	Year	Games	Won	Lost	Win %	Finish	Won	Lost	Win %	Result
CLE	2000	162	90	72	.556	2nd in AL Central	–	–	–	
CLE	2001	162	91	71	.562	1st in AL Central	2	3	.400	Lost ALDS (SEA)
CLE	2002	86	39	47	.453	Fired	–	–	–	
CLE total		410	220	190	.537		2	3	.400	
PHI	2005	162	88	74	.543	2nd in NL East	–	–	–	
PHI	2006	162	85	77	.525	2nd in NL East	–	–	–	
PHI	2007	162	89	73	.549	1st in NL East	0	3	.000	Lost NLDS (COL)
PHI	2008	162	92	70	.568	1st in NL East	11	3	.786	Won World Series (TB)
PHI	2009	162	93	69	.574	1st in NL East	9	6	.600	Lost World Series (NYY)
PHI	2010	162	97	65	.599	1st in NL East	5	4	.556	Lost NLCS (SF)
PHI	2011	162	102	60	.630	1st in NL East	2	3	.400	Lost NLDS (STL)
PHI	2012	162	81	81	.500	3rd in NL East	–	–	–	
PHI	2013	120	53	67	.442	Fired	–	–	–	
PHI total		1416	780	636	.551		27	19	.587	
Total		1826	1000	826	.548		29	22	.569	

== Personal life and health ==
Manuel has survived a heart attack, quadruple bypass surgery, a blocked and infected colon, and kidney cancer. During his time with the Indians, he worked in the dugout with a colostomy bag beneath his jacket.

Manuel's mother June died on October 10, 2008, at age 87, in Buena Vista, Virginia. She had suffered a heart attack earlier in the week.

In 2015, he was married to his wife, Melissa "Missy" Martin. He lives with his wife in Florida. He has two children, Chuck and Julie; three step-children, Collin, Hailey and Allie; and five grandchildren.

On September 16, 2023, Manuel suffered a stroke during surgery. Manuel survived the stroke and was released from ICU two days later. The following day, he tweeted a message of gratitude for all those supporting him, and for the efforts of Lakeland (FL) Regional Health medical staff.

== See also ==
- List of Major League Baseball managers with most career wins

Sporting positions
Preceded by Ken Staples	Wisconsin Rapids Twins Manager; 1983	Succeeded by last manager
Preceded by Phil Roof	Orlando Twins Manager; 1984–1985	Succeeded by George Mitterwald
Preceded by Cal Ermer	Toledo Mud Hens Manager; 1986	Succeeded by Leon Roberts
Preceded by Bill Dancy	Portland Beavers Manager; 1987	Succeeded by Jim Mahoney
Preceded by Bobby Bonds	Cleveland Indians Hitting Coach; 1988–1989	Succeeded by José Morales
Preceded by Bob Molinaro	Colorado Springs Sky Sox Manager; 1990–1992	Succeeded by Brad Mills
Preceded by Marv Foley	Charlotte Knights Manager; 1993	Succeeded by Brian Graham
Preceded by José Morales	Cleveland Indians Hitting Coach; 1994–1999	Succeeded by Clarence Jones
Preceded by John Mallee	Philadelphia Phillies Hitting coach 2019 (hired Aug. 13, 2019)	Succeeded by Joe Dillon
