= Hugh Quattlebaum =

American baseball player and coach (born 1978)

- Second baseman / Third baseman / Hitting coach
- Born: June 26, 1978 (age 47); Methuen, Massachusetts, U.S.
- Bats: Right Throws: Right

Teams
- New York Mets (2021); Atlanta Braves (2025)

Hugh Quattlebaum (born June 26, 1978) is an American former professional baseball infielder who currently serves as a hitting coordinator in the St. Louis Cardinals organization.

== Playing career ==
A native of Methuen, Massachusetts, Quattlebaum attended Amherst College. In 1999, he played collegiate summer baseball with the Bourne Braves of the Cape Cod Baseball League. Quattlebaum was selected by the Detroit Tigers in the 25th round of the 2000 MLB draft.

== Coaching career ==
=== New York Mets ===
On May 4, 2021, the Mets promoted Quattlebaum as the hitting coach replacing Chili Davis after the team had a .241 batting average through 22 games. After the season, Quattlebaum was reassigned along with Kevin Howard to the minor leagues. Following the 2022 season, Quattlebaum and the Mets parted ways.

=== Atlanta Braves ===
On November 22, 2024, Quattlebaum was hired by the Atlanta Braves to serve as an assistant hitting coach.

=== St. Louis Cardinals ===
On December 18, 2025, Quattlebaum was hired to serve as a hitting coordinator within the player development department of the St. Louis Cardinals.

Preceded by Chili Davis	New York Mets hitting coach 2021	Succeeded by Eric Chavez
