= Tom Slater (baseball) =

American professional baseball coach (born 1968)

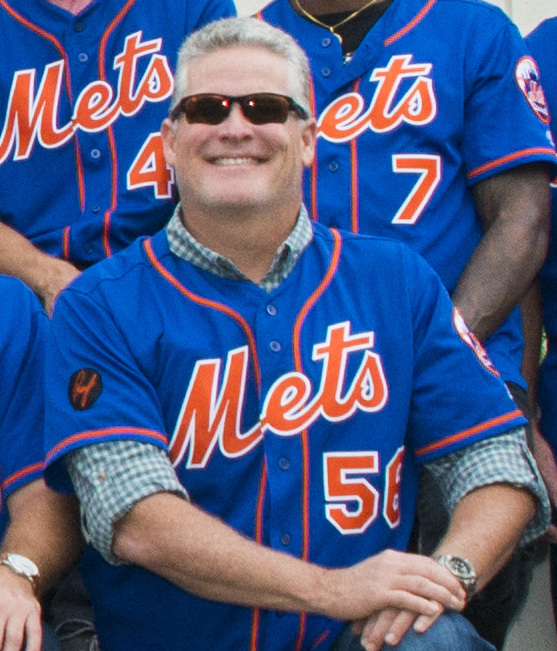
- Slater with the New York Mets in 2019
- Third baseman / Assistant hitting coach
- Born: April 6, 1968 (age 57); Richmond, Virginia, U.S.

Teams
- New York Mets (2018–2021)

Thomas Slater (born April 6, 1968) is an American professional baseball coach. He was the assistant hitting coach for the New York Mets of Major League Baseball (MLB) from 2018 to 2021.

== Early life ==
Slater graduated from St. Christopher's School in Richmond, Virginia, and the Virginia Military Institute (VMI). He played college baseball for the VMI Keydets as a third baseman for four years.

== Career ==
He coached baseball at St. Christopher’s School in 1991, and served on the coaching staffs of the Marshall Thundering Herd, VMI, and Auburn Tigers.

Slater was the head coach of VMI's baseball team from 2001 through 2003. He served as an assistant coach for the Florida Gators in 2004. He coached the Auburn Tigers from 2005 through 2008. He joined the New York Yankees organization, managing the Gulf Coast Yankees of the Rookie-level Gulf Coast League in 2010 and the Staten Island Yankees of the Class A-Short Season New York-Penn League in 2011, before becoming the hitting coach of the Trenton Thunder of the Class AA Eastern League in 2012. In 2013 and 2014, Slater was the Yankees' roving hitting instructor. Slater coached the Tampa Yankees of the Class A-Advanced Florida State League in 2015 and 2016, and returned to Trenton in 2017. After the 2017 season, the New York Mets hired Slater as their assistant hitting coach. On May 3, 2021, Slater was fired by the Mets after the team had a .241 average through 22 games.

Sporting positions
| Preceded by Pat Roessler | New York Mets assistant hitting coach 2018–2021 | Succeeded by Kevin Howard |
