= Joe Dillon =

American baseball player & coach (born 1975)

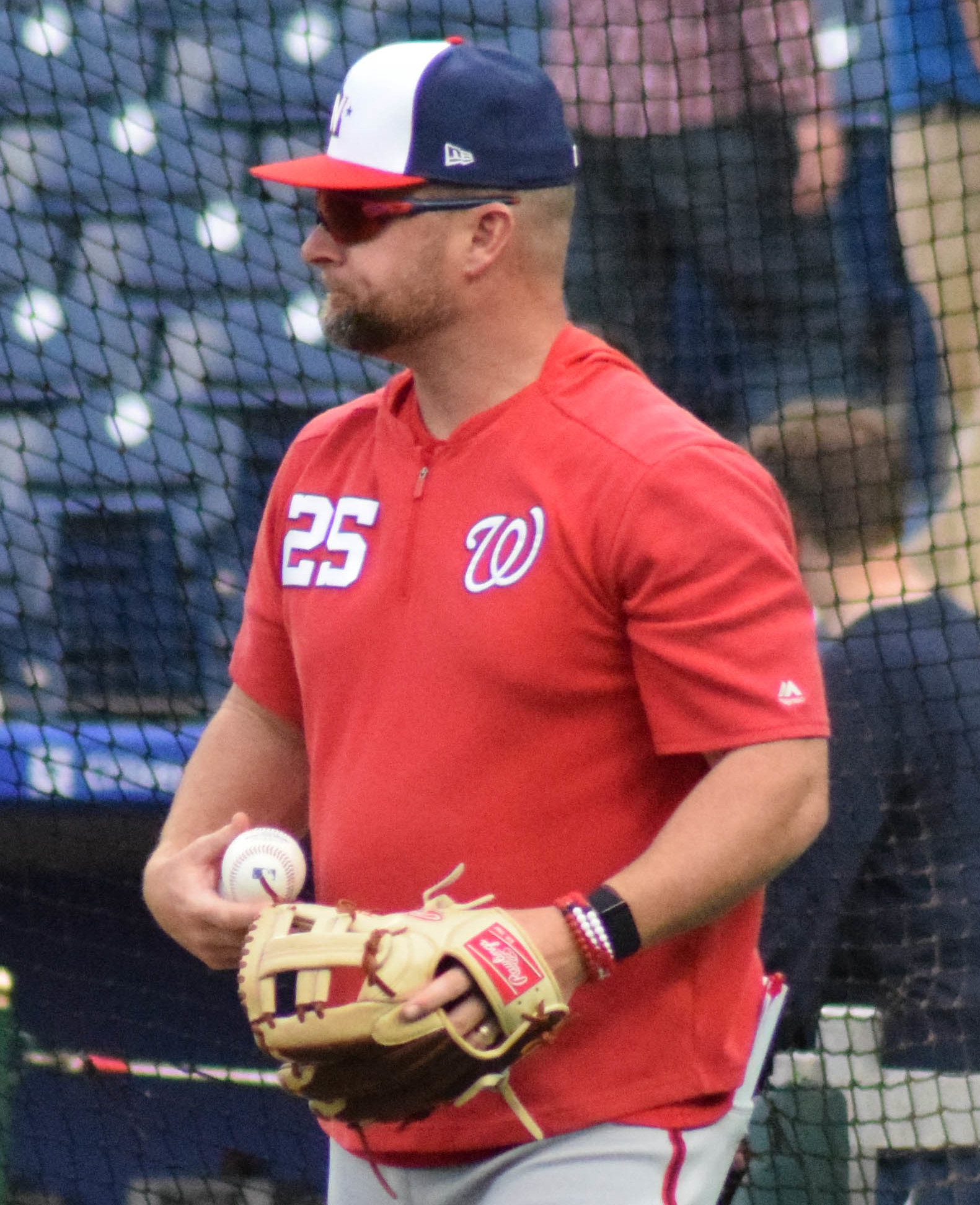
- Dillon with the Washington Nationals in 2019
- Utility player / Coach
- Born: August 2, 1975 (age 51); Modesto, California, U.S.
- Batted: Right Threw: Right

Professional debut
- MLB: May 18, 2005, for the Florida Marlins
- NPB: May 5, 2006, for the Yomiuri Giants

Last appearance
- NPB: August 10, 2006, for the Yomiuri Giants
- MLB: August 4, 2009, for the Tampa Bay Rays

MLB statistics
- Batting average: .263
- Home runs: 3
- Runs batted in: 19

NPB statistics
- Batting average: .195
- Home runs: 2
- Runs batted in: 7
- Stats at Baseball Reference

Teams
- As player: Florida Marlins (2005); Yomiuri Giants (2006); Milwaukee Brewers (2007–2008); Tampa Bay Rays (2009); As coach: Washington Nationals (2018–2019); Philadelphia Phillies (2020–2021); Kansas City Royals (2024–2025)

Career highlights and awards
- World Series champion (2019)

Joseph William Dillon (born August 2, 1975) is an American former professional baseball utility player and coach who was most recently the assistant hitting coach for the Kansas City Royals in Major League Baseball (MLB). He played in MLB for the Florida Marlins, Milwaukee Brewers, and Tampa Bay Rays, and in Nippon Professional Baseball (NPB) for the Yomiuri Giants. He was an assistant hitting coach for the Washington Nationals from 2018 to 2019, before serving as the hitting coach for the Philadelphia Phillies during the 2020 and 2021 seasons.

== College ==
After graduating from Cardinal Newman High School in Santa Rosa, California in 1993, Dillon entered college at Santa Rosa Junior College and then Texas Tech University. His college baseball career with the Texas Tech Red Raiders included a 33 home run season in 1997, a record which still stands today.

== Professional baseball player ==
=== Kansas City Royals organization (1997–2001) ===
On June 3, 1997, Dillon was drafted by the Kansas City Royals in the 7th round (211th overall) of the 1997 Major League Baseball draft. He played the 1997 season with the Low-A Spokane Indians, the 1998 season with the Single-A Lansing Lugnuts, and the 1999 season with the High-A Wilmington Blue Rocks. Dillon split the 2000 season between the Double-A Wichita Wranglers and the Triple-A Omaha Royals. During his time with Omaha, he suffered a herniated disc in his back. He returned to Omaha for the 2001 season.

=== Minnesota Twins organization (2001–2003) ===
On December 31, 2001, Dillon was drafted by the Minnesota Twins in the 2001 Rule 5 Draft. For the 2002 season, he was assigned to the Double-A New Britain Rock Cats, spending nearly the entire season there, before being promoted to the Triple-A Edmonton Trappers.

=== Brief retirement (2003–2004) ===
Continued problems with his back, including increasing stiffness, prompted Dillon to retire during spring training 2003. On March 24, 2003, he was released from the Twins. During the year, Dillon underwent back surgery to repair the herniated disc. Following that, he returned to his alma mater, Texas Tech University, to coach its 2003 baseball team. His back felt better, and he decided to return to playing professional baseball.

=== Florida Marlins organization; major league debut (2004–2005) ===
On March 17, 2004, Dillon was signed as a free agent by the Florida Marlins. He began the 2004 season with the Double-A Carolina Mudcats, before being promoted to the Triple-A Albuquerque Isotopes.

Dillon began the 2005 season with Florida, before returning briefly to Albuquerque. On May 18, 2005, he was recalled to the big leagues, making his MLB debut that same afternoon, when (by an unfortunate coincidence) Marlins starting third-baseman Mike Lowell lost a foul pop-up by Milton Bradley of the Los Angeles Dodgers in the sun, causing Lowell to be struck by the ball in his face, subsequently forcing him to leave the game. Dillon’s stat line for his first major league game included four at bats, one hit, and one strikeout. For the season, in 36 at bats, he posted a batting average of .167 with one home run. After the season, Dillon was granted free agency.

=== Venados de Mazatlán (2005) ===
Dillon joined the Mazatlán Deer of the Pacific Mexican Winter League late in the 2004–2005 season, helping the team win the Caribbean Series championship.

=== Yomiuri Giants (2006) ===
Dillon was signed by the Yomiuri Giants of Nippon Professional Baseball, for the 2006 season. He played the entire season in Japan.

=== Florida Marlins organization (2006–2007) ===
Upon returning to American professional baseball, Dillon re-joined the Florida Marlins, who signed him to a minor league contract, on December 20, 2006. The following spring, he asked for, and received, his release from the contract.

=== Milwaukee Brewers organization (2007–2008) ===
On April 1, 2007, Dillon signed a minor league contract with the Milwaukee Brewers, who assigned him to the Triple-A Nashville Sounds of the Pacific Coast League. On August 1, 2007, he was called up to the Brewers along with Elmer Dessens when pitcher Scott Linebrink left on bereavement leave and second baseman Rickie Weeks was sent down to Nashville.

Although expectations were high for Dillon in the off-season prior to the 2008 campaign, he failed to make the big league roster out of spring training, instead finding himself back in Triple-A Nashville. Dillon was recalled by the Brewers, on May 1, 2008; in a corresponding move, the Brewers designated relief pitcher Derrick Turnbow for assignment.

=== Oakland Athletics organization (2008–2009) ===
Following the 2008 season, Dillon was claimed off waivers by the Oakland Athletics.

On January 7, 2009, Dillon was designated for assignment to clear a roster spot for Jason Giambi and was sent outright to the minor leagues.

=== Tampa Bay Rays organization (2009–2010) ===
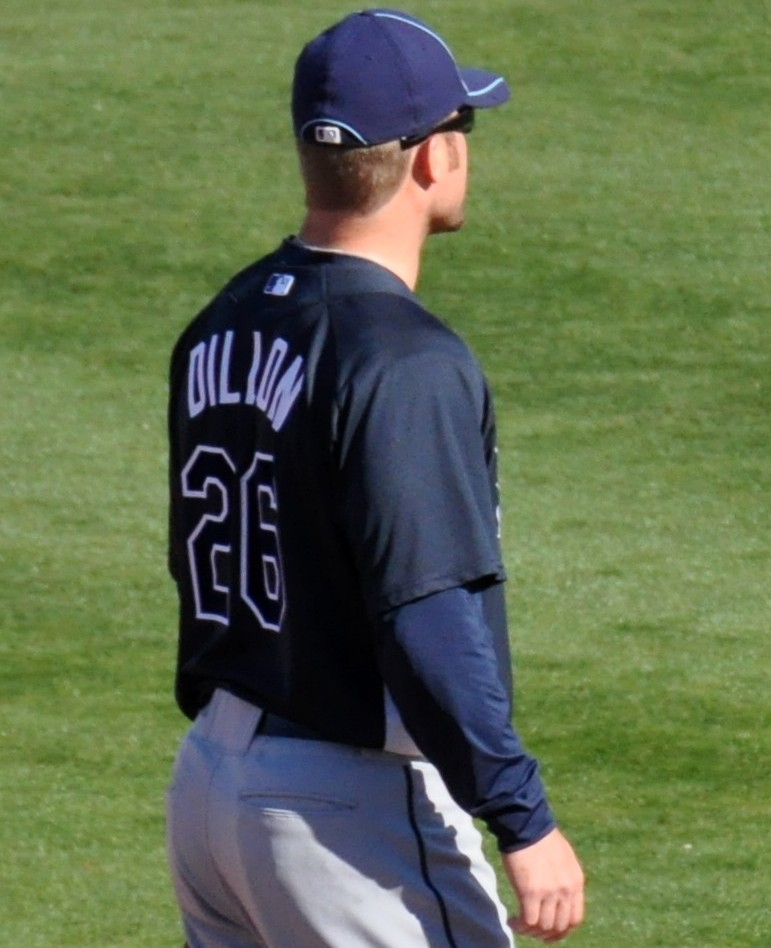
Dillon with the Tampa Bay Rays during spring training in 2010

On May 10, 2009, Dillon traded by Oakland to the Tampa Bay Rays, in return for Adam Kennedy. He played in 15 MLB games in 2009, mostly as a designated hitter (DH) and pinch hitter. Dillon compiled a .300 BA, with one home run, and two RBI.

On December 18, 2009, Dillon re-signed a minor league contract with the Rays. Dillon attempted to add catcher to his list of fielding positions in spring training of the 2010 season. He retired following his release, November 6, 2010.

== Coaching career ==
=== Washington Nationals ===
On December 20, 2013, Dillon was announced as the hitting coach for the Washington Nationals' Triple-A affiliate, the Syracuse Chiefs.

=== Miami Marlins ===
He spent the 2016 and 2017 seasons as the minor league hitting coordinator for the Miami Marlins organization.

=== Washington Nationals (second stint) ===
Dillon was named as the assistant hitting coach for the Washington Nationals for the 2018 season.

=== Philadelphia Phillies ===
On November 21, 2019, the Philadelphia Phillies announced Dillon as their new hitting coach for the 2020 season. He was dismissed from the position on October 3, 2021, before the Phillies played the final game of the 2021 season.

=== Kansas City Royals ===
Dillon was named the assistant hitting coach for the Kansas City Royals for the 2024 season. On October 5, 2025, general manager J. J. Picollo announced that Dillon would not return to the team for the 2026 season.

=== Chicago Cubs ===
On February 18, 2026, Dillon was announced as the hitting coach for the Knoxville Smokies, the Double-A affiliate of the Chicago Cubs.

== See also ==
- Rule 5 draft results

Sporting positions
Preceded by Troy Gingrich	Syracuse Chiefs hitting coach 2014–2015	Succeeded by Brian Daubach
Preceded by Jacque Jones	Washington Nationals assistant hitting coach 2018–2019	Succeeded by Pat Roessler
Preceded by Charlie Manuel	Philadelphia Phillies hitting coach 2020–2021	Succeeded by Kevin Long
