= Glenn Sherlock =

American baseball coach (born 1960)

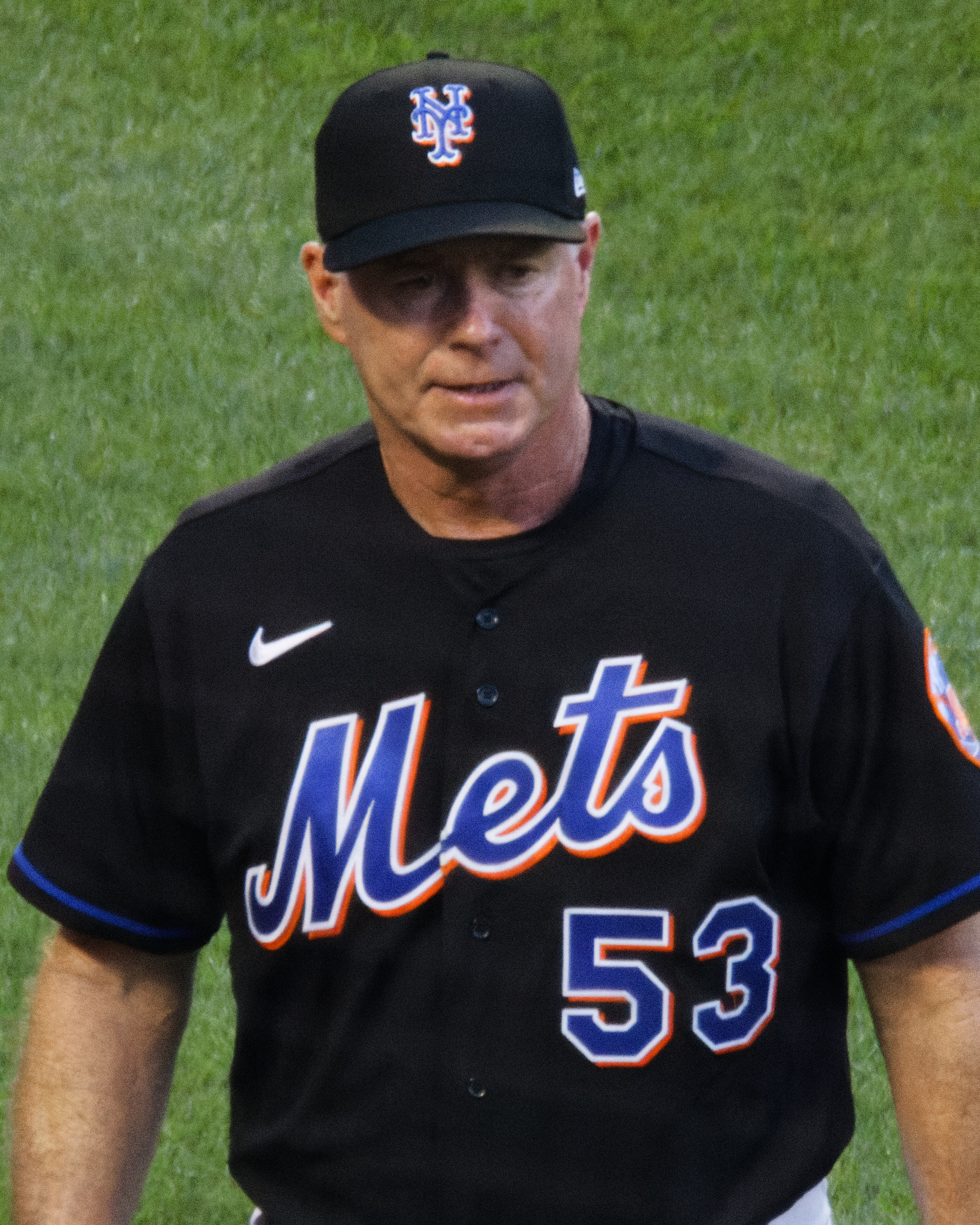
- Sherlock with the Mets in 2022
- Catcher / Coach
- Born: September 26, 1960 (age 66); Nahant, Massachusetts, U.S.
- Bats: Left Throws: Right
- Stats at Baseball Reference

Teams
- As coach: New York Yankees (1995); Arizona Diamondbacks (1998–2016); New York Mets (2017–2019); Pittsburgh Pirates (2020–2021); New York Mets (2022–2025)

Career highlights and awards
- World Series champion (2001)

Glenn Patrick Sherlock (born September 26, 1960) is an American former professional baseball coach. He was a coach in Major League Baseball (MLB) for the Pittsburgh Pirates, New York Mets, and one of the original coaches for the Arizona Diamondbacks, serving for 19 consecutive seasons (1998–2016). He was the team's longtime bullpen coach, although he spent stints as bench coach (2003), first base coach (2004) and third base coach (2004; 2014).

== Playing career ==
Sherlock attended Rollins College, and in 1981 and 1982 he played collegiate summer baseball with the Yarmouth-Dennis Red Sox of the Cape Cod Baseball League. He was originally signed by the Houston Astros as their 21st pick in the 1983 MLB draft. A catcher, he played in the Astros and New York Yankees farm system until he retired in 1988.

== Coaching and managerial career ==
Sherlock managed the Rookie-level Gulf Coast League Yankees (1990; 1993) and led the Single-A Fort Lauderdale Yankees in 1991, when he was named a coach for the Florida State League All-Star Game. His three-year minor league managerial record wrapped up at 121-128 (.486) and then he went down under to hone his managerial skills in the winter of 1993, leading the Canberra Bushrangers in the Australian Baseball League.

Sherlock was catching instructor for the Yankees twice, working in the bullpen in 1992, then once again in 1994 and 1995. He was employed for ten seasons in the Yankee chain either as a minor league player, coach or manager.

Brought to the Diamondbacks in 1996 as a minor league instructor by Buck Showalter, the team's first manager and also a veteran of the Yankee farm system, Sherlock worked for eight different managers in his 19 seasons on the Diamondbacks' MLB staff. On November 15, 2016, it was announced that Sherlock would replace Tim Teufel as the Mets' new third base coach and a catching instructor.

Sherlock joined the Pittsburgh Pirates as a coach prior to the 2020 season.

Sherlock was named bench coach for the New York Mets on January 15, 2022. After the 2022 season, it was announced that Eric Chavez would take over as bench coach while Sherlock would become a Major League catching coach. On October 3, 2025, it was announced that Sherlock would be retiring from coaching.

Sporting positions
Preceded by Clete Boyer	New York Yankees bench coach 1995	Succeeded by Don Zimmer
Preceded by Alan Trammell	Arizona Diamondbacks bench coach 2015–2016	Succeeded by Ron Gardenhire
Preceded by Tim Teufel	New York Mets third base coach 2017–2018	Succeeded by Gary DiSarcina
Preceded by Rubén Amaro Jr.	New York Mets first base coach 2019	Succeeded by Tony DeFrancesco
