= John Mallee =

American baseball coach (born 1969)

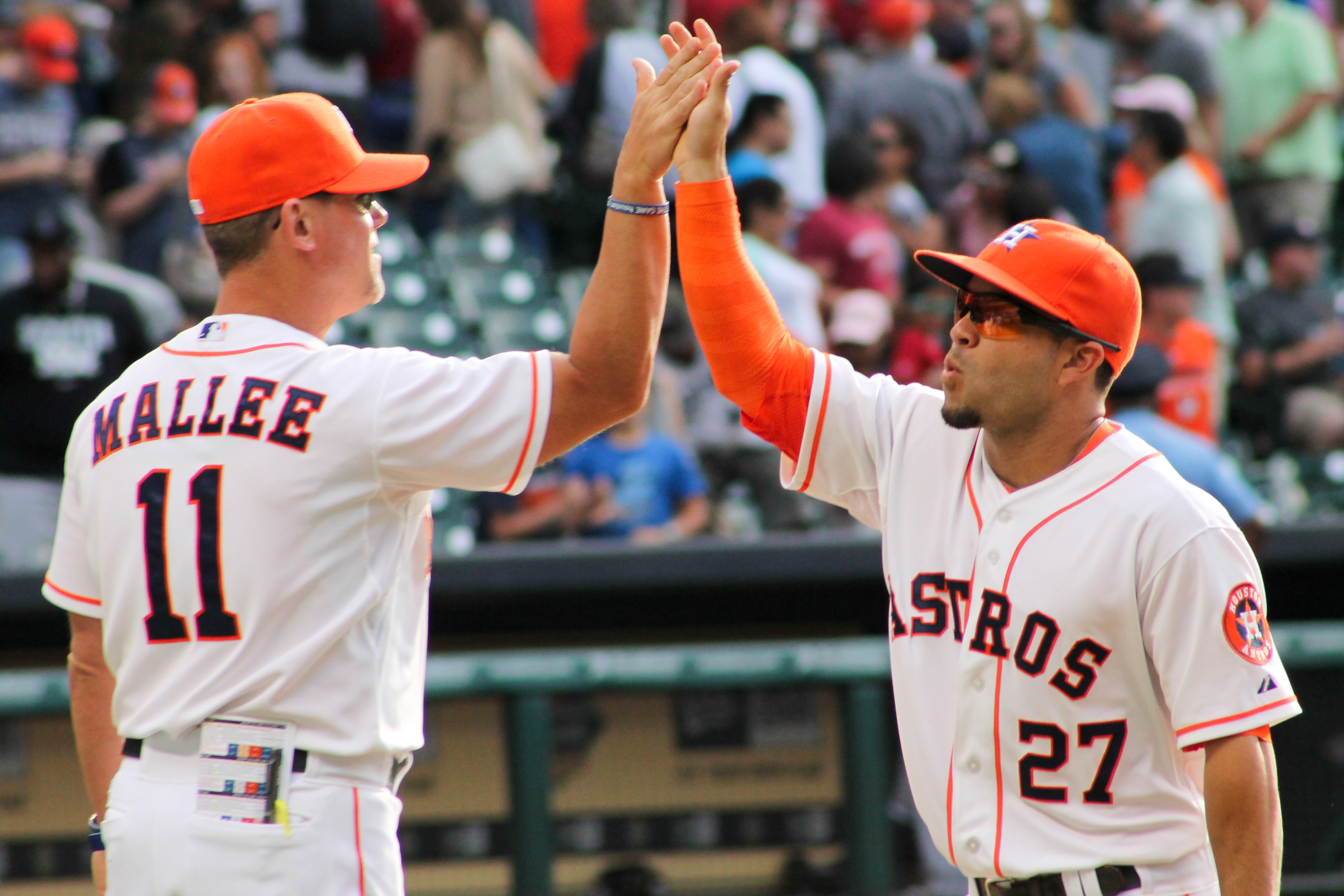
- Mallee and Astros second baseman Jose Altuve in May 2014

Chicago Cubs – No. 80
- Hitting coach
- Born: May 5, 1969 (age 57); Chicago, Illinois, U.S.
- Stats at Baseball Reference

Teams
- Florida Marlins (2010–2011); Houston Astros (2013–2014); Chicago Cubs (2015–2017); Philadelphia Phillies (2018–2019); Los Angeles Angels (2020–2022); Chicago Cubs (2024–present)

Career highlights and awards
- World Series champion (2016)

John Daniel Mallee (pronounced "MAY lee"; born May 5, 1969) is an American professional baseball coach. He is the current assistant hitting coach for the Chicago Cubs of Major League Baseball (MLB). As a minor league player, Mallee was a shortstop and second baseman. He has previously been the hitting coach of the Florida Marlins, Houston Astros, Chicago Cubs, and Philadelphia Phillies.

== Early life ==
Mallee was born in Chicago, Illinois. He attended Chicago State University and the University of Illinois at Chicago, where he majored in kinesiology.

== Baseball career ==
=== Playing career ===
Mallee was drafted by the Philadelphia Phillies in the 10th round of the 1991 amateur draft, out of University of Illinois at Chicago. He played in minor league baseball from 1991 to 1992 in the Philadelphia Phillies minor league system, for Rookie League Martinsville (1991) and Single-A Spartanburg (1992). Mallee hit .208/.313/.257 with 8 stolen bases and 28 RBI in 115 career minor league games, playing 95 games at shortstop and 20 games at second base.

=== Coaching career ===
He began his coaching career with Milwaukee as the hitting coach for Beloit (A, 1996-97; 99), Stockton (A, 1998), and Huntsville (AA, 2000). He was then the minor league hitting coach for the Montreal Expos at Ottawa (AAA, 2001).

He then served as the Florida Marlins minor league hitting coordinator for nine seasons, from 2002 to 2010, and their major league hitting coach from 2010 to 2011.

On October 19, 2012, the Astros announced that Mallee would be their hitting coach for 2012, working under Bo Porter. He was their major league hitting coach from 2013 to 2014.

On October 9, 2014, he was named by the Chicago Cubs as their major league hitting coach, succeeding Bill Mueller. On October 26, 2017, the Cubs announced that Mallee had been released from his contract and Chili Davis was named as his replacement.

On November 10, 2017, he was hired as the hitting coach of the Philadelphia Phillies under manager Gabe Kapler. On August 13, 2019, after a slump in which the Phillies fell from first place to fourth place in the NL East, he was replaced by former Phillies manager Charlie Manuel.

He was hired by the Los Angeles Angels as their assistant hitting coach prior to the 2020 season. Following the 2022 season, the Angels stated that Mallee would not be returning to a coaching position with the team.

Mallee rejoined the Cubs organization in February 2023 as the hitting coach of the team's Triple-A affiliate, the Iowa Cubs. On November 1, 2023, he was promoted to the Cubs' major league staff as an assistant hitting coach under new manager Craig Counsell. Cubs outfielder Pete Crow-Armstrong credited Mallee with assisting him in developing as a hitter during his 2026 MVP season.

== Personal life ==
He is married to Torri Haytack. He has two sons from a previous marriage, John III and Austin.

Sporting positions
Preceded by Jim Presley	Florida Marlins Hitting coach 2010-2011 (fired during 2011)	Succeeded by Eduardo Pérez
Preceded by Ty Van Burkleo	Houston Astros Hitting coach 2013–2014	Succeeded by Dave Hudgens
Preceded by Bill Mueller	Chicago Cubs Hitting coach 2015–2017	Succeeded by Chili Davis
Preceded by Matt Stairs	Philadelphia Phillies Hitting coach 2018–2019 (fired Aug. 13, 2019)	Succeeded by Charlie Manuel
Preceded by Shawn Wooten	Los Angeles Angels Assistant Hitting coach 2020–2022	Succeeded by Phil Plantier
