= Kevin Howard =

American baseball player (born 1981)

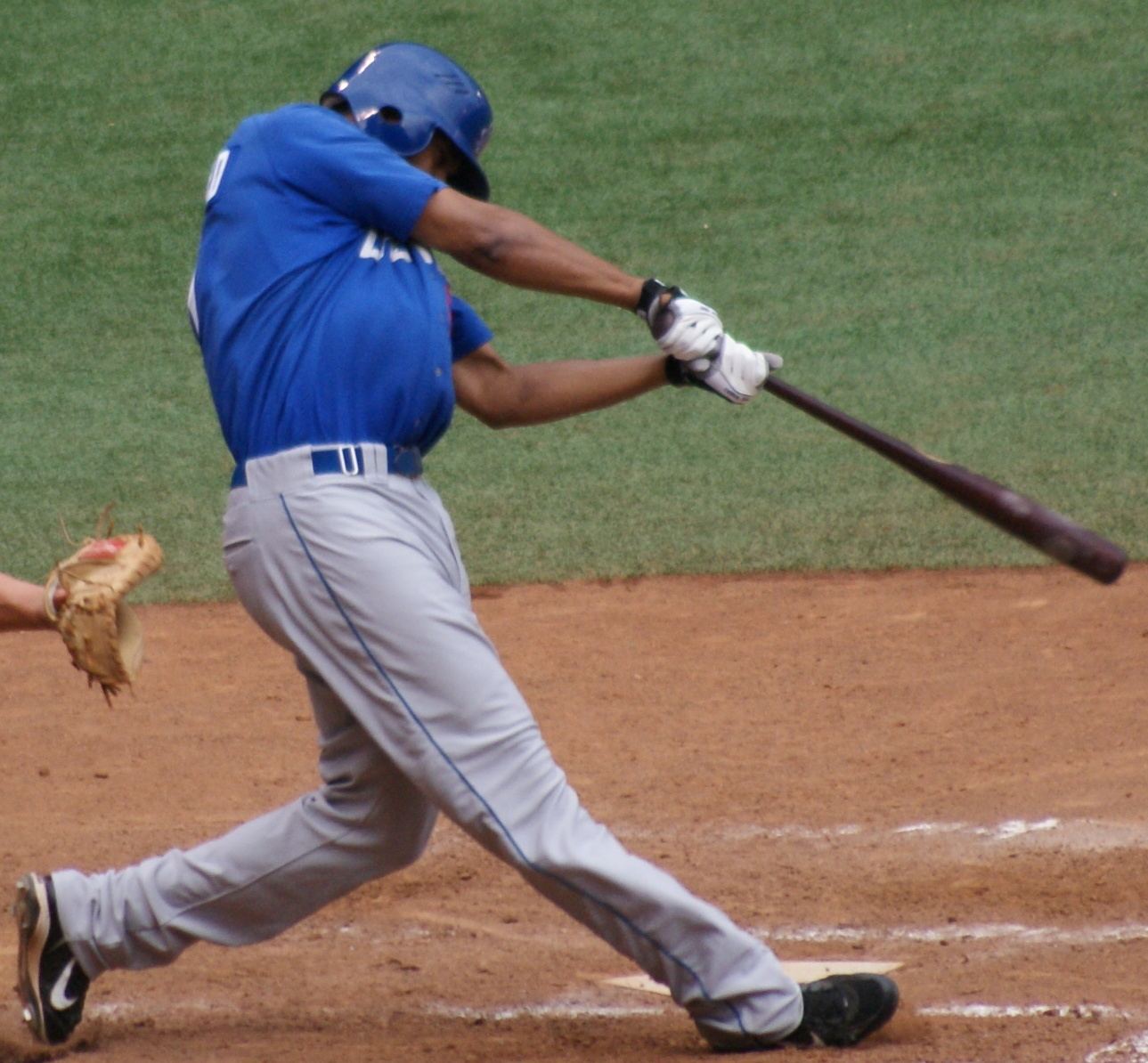
- Howard with the Las Vegas 51s in 2009
- Infielder / Assistant hitting coach
- Born: June 25, 1981 (age 45); Hinsdale, Illinois, U.S.
- Bats: Left Throws: Right

Teams
- As coach: New York Mets (2021)

Kevin C. Howard (born June 25, 1981) is an American former professional baseball infielder. He was drafted by the Cincinnati Reds in the 5th round of the 2002 Major League Baseball draft. Howard served as the assistant hitting coach for the New York Mets of Major League Baseball (MLB) in 2021.

== Amateur career ==
Howard attended Westlake High School. In 1999, his senior campaign, Howard was named the Los Angeles Times Ventura County Player of the Year. Howard also played football at Westlake. Howard committed to attend the University of Miami. Howard was drafted in the 22nd round of the 1999 Major League Baseball draft by the San Diego Padres, but did not sign and attended college.

While at the University of Miami in 2000, he played collegiate summer baseball with the Wareham Gatemen of the Cape Cod Baseball League. In 2001, Howard played in the 2001 NCAA Division I baseball tournament, where Miami was the tournament's champions. Howard faced off with former high school team Scott Dragicevich, who played for Stanford, in the World Series. In 2001, Howard was named to the United States national baseball team.

== Professional career ==
Howard was a fifth-round draft pick by the Cincinnati Reds in the 2002 Major League Baseball draft. He made his professional debut in 2003 with the Single-A Dayton Dragons. In 2004, Howard played for the High-A Potomac Cannons, batting .286/.366/.408 with 11 home runs and 79 RBI. He spent the 2005 season in Double-A with the Chattanooga Lookouts, hitting .296/.346/.428 with 12 homers and 70 RBI.

On December 8, 2005, Howard was traded to the New York Yankees along with Ben Himes in exchange for infielder Tony Womack. He spent the 2006 season with the Double-A Trenton Thunder, batting .255/.309/.391 with 8 home runs and 42 RBI in 102 games. On March 31, 2007, Howard was released by the Yankees organization.

On April 11, 2007, Howard signed a minor league contract with the Philadelphia Phillies organization but was quickly sold to the Los Angeles Dodgers on June 21. He finished the season in Double-A with Jacksonville Suns, batting .292/.358/.432 in 64 games. He was assigned to the Triple-A Las Vegas 51s to begin the 2008 season but was released on August 8, 2008.

On August 11, 2008, Howard signed a minor league contract with the Seattle Mariners organization. He finished the season in Triple-A with the Tacoma Rainiers and elected free agency on November 3, 2008. On November 20, 2008, Howard signed a minor league deal with the San Diego Padres. He was assigned to the Triple-A Portland Beavers to begin the 2009 season and split the year between Portland and the Double-A San Antonio Missions, with only 7 RBI in 27 games for the two teams. On May 15, 2009, the Padres sold Howard to the Toronto Blue Jays organization. He finished the season with the Las Vegas 51s before electing free agency on November 9, 2009. On January 24, 2010, Howard signed a minor league deal with the St. Louis Cardinals organization. He was assigned to the Triple-A Memphis Redbirds, but after hitting .242/.294/.355 in 97 games, he was released on September 7, 2010.

On April 13, 2011, Howard signed with the Lancaster Barnstormers of the Atlantic League of Professional Baseball. He hit .381/.416/.542 in 31 games for Lancaster in 2011. On June 13, Howard signed with the Toronto Blue Jays organization, and finished the year between the Blue Jays' Triple-A and Double-A teams. He split the 2012 season between the Triple-A Las Vegas 51s and the Double-A New Hampshire Fisher Cats, hitting .292/.337/.432 in 100 games between the two teams. He elected free agency on November 3, 2012.

In April 2013, Howard signed with the Lancaster Barnstormers in the Atlantic League, with whom he had played for in 2011. He hit .237/.277/.334 with 5 home runs and 27 RBI in 84 games for the club in 2013. On March 6, 2014, Howard signed with the Lincoln Saltdogs of the American Association of Independent Professional Baseball. He hit .310/.355/.439 in 47 games before being released on August 4, 2014.

Howard's professional baseball career lasted 10 seasons in the minors with 14 different teams and two seasons in independent ball. When he retired after the 2014 season, Howard had a career minor-league average of .284 with 93 home runs and 540 RBI.

== Coaching career ==
After his professional baseball career, Howard returned to the University of Miami to finish his degree in business management. While there, he was coaching at Division II Barry University when the Cleveland Indians contacted him about becoming a coach in their organization. He joined the Indians’ player development staff in 2015 as hitting coach for the short-season Single-A Mahoning Valley Scrappers. In January 2019, Howard was promoted to the organizations hitting coordinator position.

On January 21, 2021, Howard was hired by the New York Mets as the organization's executive director of player development. On May 3, 2021, the Mets promoted Howard to assistant hitting coach after Tom Slater was relieved of his duties. After the season, Howard returned to his position as director of player development.

Sporting positions
Preceded by Tom Slater	New York Mets assistant hitting coach 2021	Succeeded by Jeremy Barnes
