= Pat Roessler =

American baseball coach (born 1959)

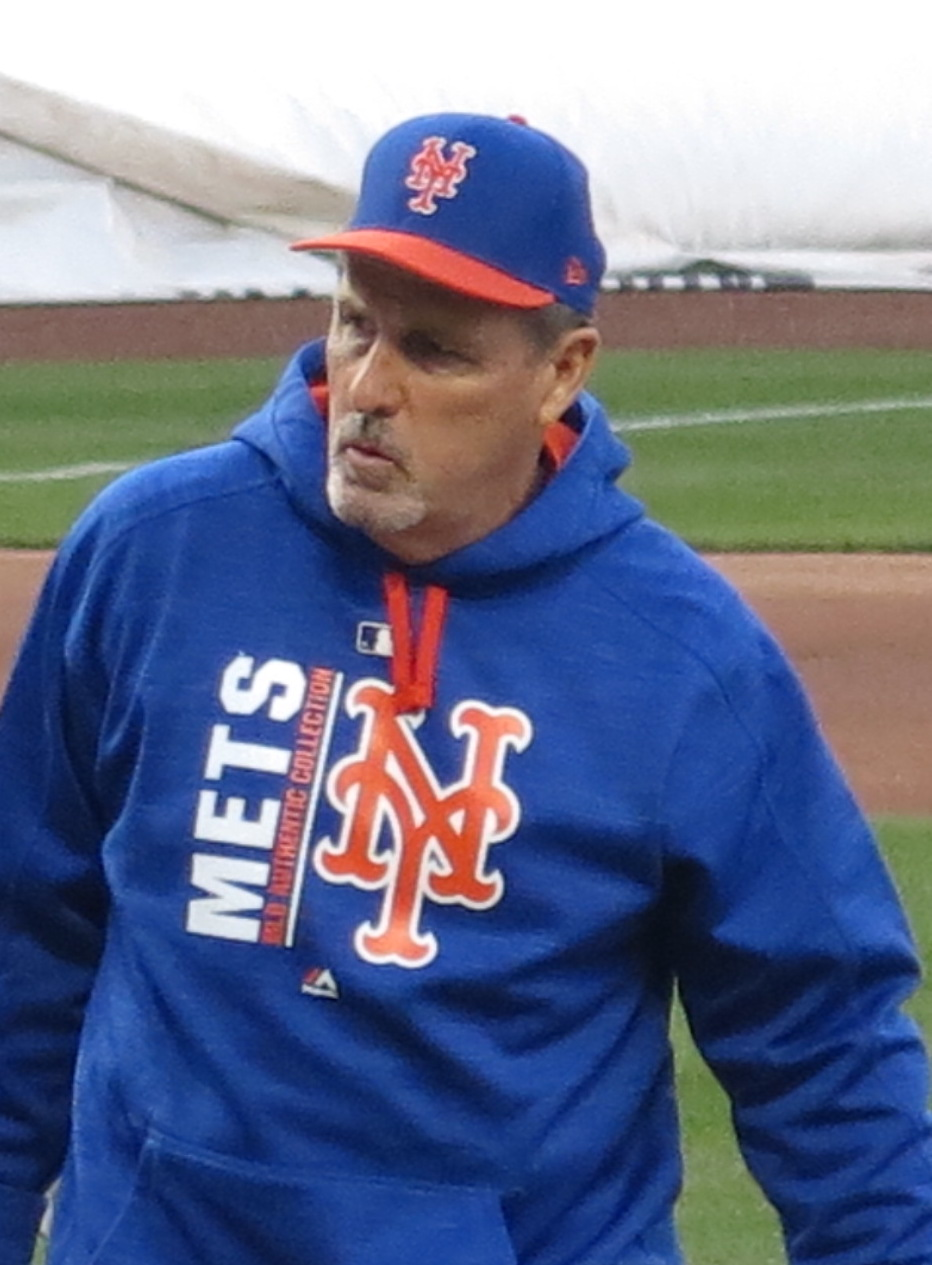
- Roessler with the Mets in 2017

New York Yankees – No. 66
- Assistant hitting coach
- Born: December 27, 1959 (age 66); Phoenix, Arizona, U.S.
- Bats: Switch Throws: Right
- Stats at Baseball Reference

Teams
- As coach: Montreal Expos (2000–2001); New York Mets (2015–2018); Washington Nationals (2020–2023); New York Yankees (2024–present)

Patrick Alan Roessler (born December 27, 1959) is an American professional baseball coach. He is the assistant hitting coach for the New York Yankees of Major League Baseball. He has also coached in MLB for the Montreal Expos from 2000 to 2001, the New York Mets from 2015 to 2018, and the Washington Nationals from 2020 to 2023.

== Playing career ==
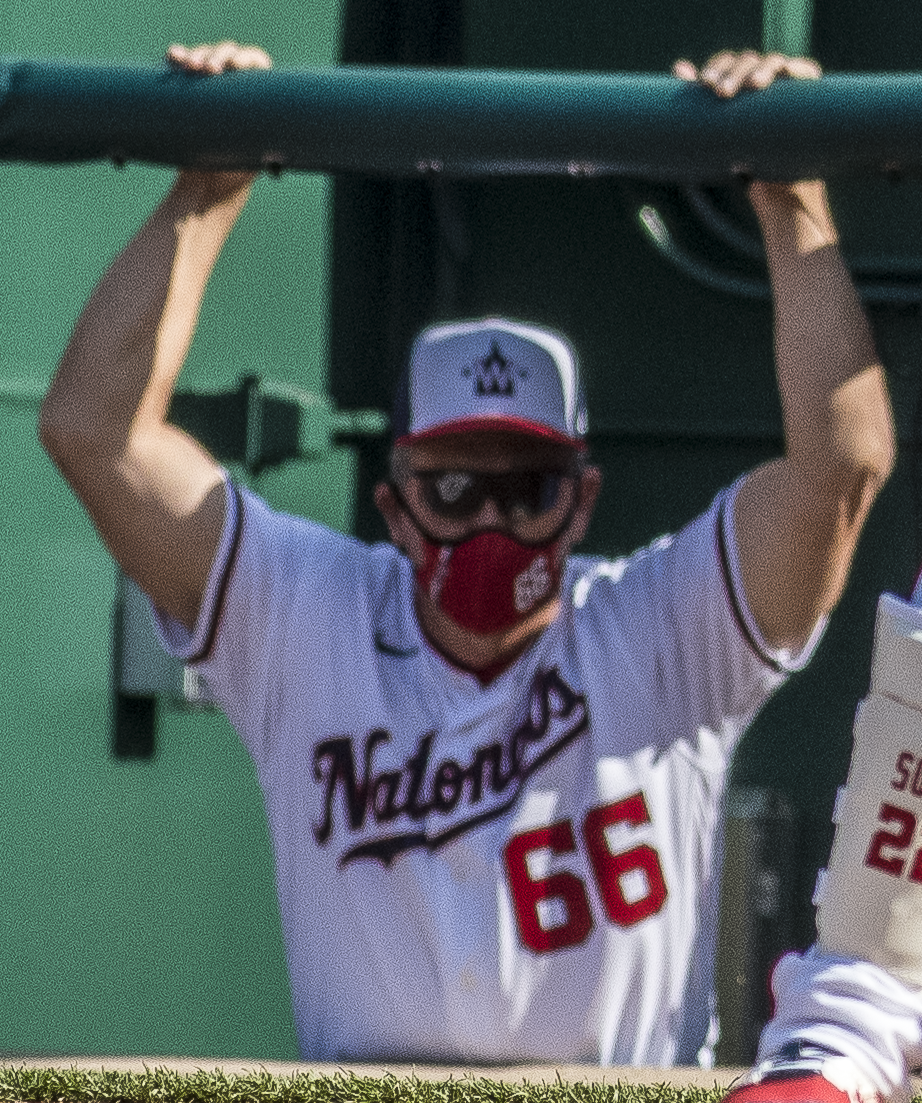
Roessler with the Nationals in 2021

Roessler attended the University of Arizona, and played college baseball for the Arizona Wildcats baseball team. Roessler was a member of the 1980 College World Series champions. He served as the team's captain during his senior year, in 1982.

== Coaching career ==
Roessler served as an assistant baseball coach for the Old Dominion Monarchs from 1983 to 1988. He joined the Chicago White Sox organization as a minor league coach from 1988 to 1994, and then served as the hitting coordinator for the Montreal Expos from 1995 to 1997. He worked for the Pittsburgh Pirates from 1998 to 1999.

Roessler served as the hitting coach for the Expos in 2000 and 2001. He joined the New York Yankees as their director of player development in 2005, and served in the role until 2014. The New York Mets hired Roessler as their assistant hitting coach, succeeding Luis Natera, after the 2014 season. Following the 2017 season and the hiring of manager Mickey Callaway, Roessler was promoted to hitting coach. The Mets dismissed Roessler after the 2018 season.

The Washington Nationals hired Roessler to be their assistant hitting coach before the 2020 season. The Nationals fired Roessler after the 2023 season. The Yankees hired Roessler as their assistant hitting coach before the 2024 season.

Sporting positions
Preceded by Luis Natera	New York Mets assistant hitting coach 2015–2017	Succeeded by Tom Slater
Preceded by Kevin Long	New York Mets hitting coach 2018	Succeeded by Chili Davis
Preceded by Joe Dillon	Washington Nationals assistant hitting coach 2020–2023	Succeeded by Chris Johnson
