= Greg Pavlick =

American baseball player and coach

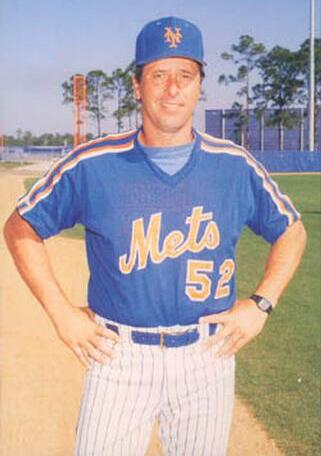
- Coach
- Born: March 10, 1950 (age 76); Washington, D.C., U.S.
- Bats: Right Throws: Right
- Stats at Baseball Reference

Career highlights and awards
- World Series champion (1986)

Gregory Michael Pavlick (born March 10, 1950) is an American former baseball pitching coach.

Pavlick attended Thomas A. Edison High School in Alexandria, Virginia and the University of North Carolina where he played college baseball for the North Carolina Tar Heels baseball team. He was chosen by the New York Mets in the second round (47th overall) of the 1971 Major League Baseball draft.

Pavlick became a pitching coach for the Mets from 1985 to 1986, 1988 to 1991, and 1994 to 1996. Pavlick was the team's assistant pitching coach (to Mel Stottlemyre) during the 1986 World Series season. He became the head pitching coach in 1994. Pavlick was fired as the pitching coach during the 1996 season due in part to his failure to adequately develop Generation K and the team's other young pitchers. He was replaced by Bob Apodaca.

By 2001, Pavlick had joined the New York Yankees organization as pitching coach for the Columbus Clippers, though he was reassigned at the end of that season. Pavlick became the pitching coach for the Tampa Yankees in 2002. Pavlick would go on to work for several years in the Yankees' minor league system including as a rehabilitation coordinator.

== See also ==
- Career statistics from Baseball Reference (Minors)
