= Kevin Long (baseball) =

American baseball coach (born 1966)

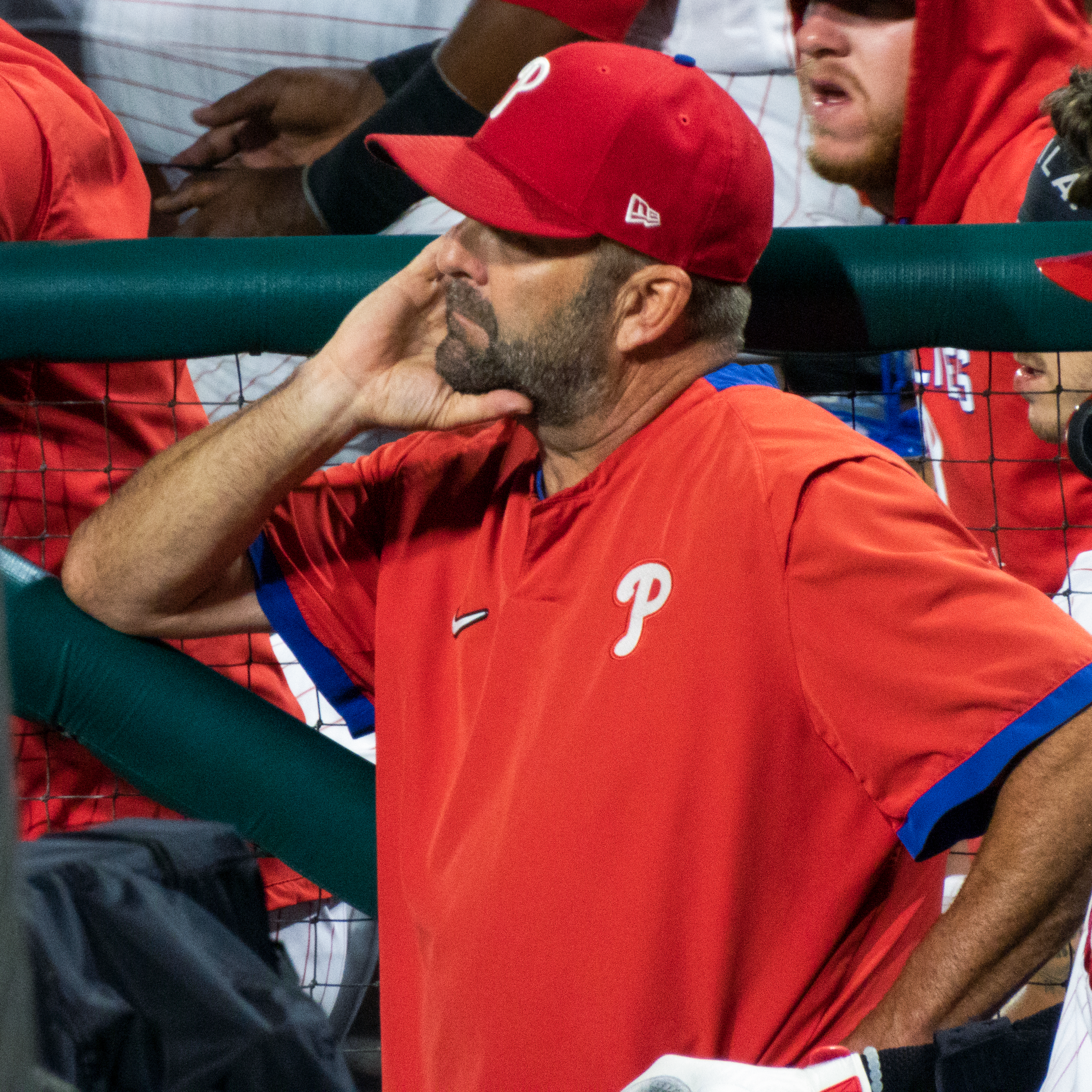
- Long with the Philadelphia Phillies in 2022
- Hitting coach
- Born: December 30, 1966 (age 59); Van Nuys, California, U.S.
- Bats: Left Throws: Left
- Stats at Baseball Reference

Teams
- As Coach: New York Yankees (2007–2014); New York Mets (2015–2017); Washington Nationals (2018–2021); Philadelphia Phillies (2022–2026)

Career highlights and awards
- 2x World Series champion (2009, 2019)

Kevin Richard Long (born December 30, 1966) is an American baseball coach who has served as a hitting coach for multiple teams in Major League Baseball (MLB). He has formerly served as the hitting coach for the New York Yankees (2007–14), New York Mets (2015–17) , Washington Nationals (2018–21), and the Philadelphia Phillies (2022–26)

== Playing career ==
Long attended Thunderbird High School in Phoenix, Arizona. There, he played baseball, basketball, and football. In 1982, he was a bat boy during spring training for the Milwaukee Brewers. Long was coached by his father in youth baseball. He also earned MVP honors in the 1984 Babe Ruth League Southwest Regional tournament after hitting a game-winning grand slam one night and pitching out of a bases loaded, no outs jam to seal the victory the next.

He attended the University of Arizona, alongside future MLB players Trevor Hoffman, J.T. Snow, and Scott Erickson. Long was on the 1986 Arizona Wildcats team that won the NCAA Tournament. In 1989, he was named a second-team All-American and first-team Pac-10 and the Wildcats won the regular season conference title. A three-year letter-winner, Long still holds the Arizona record for most extra-base hits in a game (five) and ranks in the top 10 in extra-base hits, doubles, multi-hit games, total bases, and runs scored.

Long was selected by the Kansas City Royals in the 31st round of the 1989 Major League Baseball draft. That year, he led the Class-A Eugene Emeralds in games played, at-bats, runs scored, hits, doubles, and RBI’s. He also ranked eighth among all Northwest League hitters with his .312 batting average in his rookie season. He missed most of the 1994 season after undergoing surgery on his left wrist.

== Coaching career ==
At the end of spring training in 1997, Long, who was assigned to the Triple-A Omaha Royals, decided to retire, asking instead for a coaching job. He made his professional managing debut with the Class-A Wilmington Blue Rocks. That year, he helped a young Carlos Beltran learn how to switch hit. He was named the Northwest League's co-Manager of the Year after leading the Spokane Indians to the league title in 1999.

Long next served as the hitting coach for the Wichita Wranglers in Double-A. It was there that he and manager Keith Bodie developed Long's popular net drill, an exercise used to help players shorten their swing. In 2001, he used the drill to turn Brandon Berger into a 40-home run player. He then moved up to Triple-A as the hitting coach for the Omaha Royals. When he didn't get an opportunity in 2004 to interview for the job of hitting coach for the big league team, he moved to the New York Yankees organization. Long served as hitting coach for the Columbus Clippers in Triple-A from 2004 to 2006.

Long was promoted to hitting coach for the New York Yankees in 2007. That year, the Yankees offense ranked first in MLB in runs (968), hits (1,656), home runs (201), RBI (929), team batting average (.290), slugging percentage (.463), on-base percentage (.366) and total bases (2,649). Long remained on the coaching staff after the Yankees hired Joe Girardi as manager for the 2008 season.

Under Long, the 2009 Yankees led the league in runs (915), hits (1,604), walks (663), home runs (244), RBI (881), OBP (.362), and slugging (.478) on their way to win the franchise's 27th World Series title. Following the 2010 season, the Yankees signed Long to a three-year contract. He was fired following the 2014 season.

On October 23, 2014, Long was hired by the New York Mets to be their hitting coach. In his first season there, the 2015 Mets won the National League pennant. Long helped turn Daniel Murphy into a power hitter; he hit seven homers in the 2015 postseason. He was a candidate for the open managerial position after the 2017 season, but was ultimately turned down in favor of Mickey Callaway.

Long left the Mets and became the hitting coach of the Washington Nationals on November 2, 2017. The team then won the World Series in 2019. That year, the Nationals led the National League in batting average (.265) and on-base percentage (.342), and were in the top 10 in MLB in several other batting categories.

On October 13, 2021, Long left the Nationals to become the hitting coach of the Philadelphia Phillies, reuniting him with former Yankees manager Joe Girardi. The Phillies reached the World Series in 2022. On November 12, 2022, the Phillies signed Long to a two–year contract extension. On October 14, 2026, Long was fired as the Phillies hitting coach.

== Personal life ==
When Long was still a player (though he does not remember which year), he suffered an accident during an offseason job with a drywall company, when a 25-pound sledgehammer hit him in the left eye, shattering three bones.

Long resides in Scottsdale, Arizona with wife, Marcey, daughter, Britney, and sons Tracy and Jaron. Jaron Long played professional baseball in the Yankees and Nationals organizations.

In 2011, Long released a memoir entitled Cage Rat: Lessons from a Life in Baseball by the Yankees Hitting Coach," where he detailed his approach to hitting.

Sporting positions
Preceded by Unknown	Wilmington Blue Rocks hitting coach 1997	Succeeded by Unknown
Preceded by Darrell Evans	Wilmington Blue Rocks manager 1998	Succeeded by Brian Poldberg
Preceded by Jeff Garber	Spokane Indians manager 1999	Succeeded by Tom Poquette
Preceded by Unknown	Wichita Wranglers hitting coach 2000-2001	Succeeded by Nelson Liriano
Preceded by Unknown	Omaha Royals hitting coach 2002-2003	Succeeded by Terry Bradshaw (baseball)
Preceded by Sal Rende	Columbus Clippers hitting coach 2004-2006	Succeeded by Bobby Williams
Preceded by Don Mattingly	New York Yankees hitting coach 2007–2014	Succeeded by Jeff Pentland
Preceded by Lamar Johnson	New York Mets hitting coach 2015–2017	Succeeded by Pat Roessler
Preceded by Rick Schu	Washington Nationals hitting coach 2018–2021	Succeeded by Darnell Coles
Preceded by Joe Dillon	Philadelphia Phillies hitting coach 2022–present	Succeeded by Incumbent
