= Luis Natera =

Dominican professional baseball coach (born 1966)

- Coach
- Born: March 22, 1966 (age 60); San Pedro de Macorís, Dominican Republic
- Bats: Right Throws: Right
- Stats at Baseball Reference

Teams
- As Coach: New York Mets (2014)

Luis Octavio Natera (born March 22, 1966) is a Dominican professional baseball coach. He was the assistant hitting coach for the New York Mets of Major League Baseball through the 2014 season.

Natera is from San Pedro de Macorís. He played in Minor League Baseball as a member of the Mets' organization from 1984 through 1988. He has worked for the Mets organization since 1990. Since 2007, he served as the hitting coach for the Binghamton Mets of the Class AA Eastern League. In 2014, the Mets promoted him to their major league staff. After the season, he was reassigned within the organization and was replaced by Pat Roessler in 2015.

Natera's son played for the Dominican Summer League Mets in 2010.

Preceded by Position established	New York Mets assistant hitting coach 2014	Succeeded by Pat Roessler
