= Jeremy Barnes (baseball) =

American baseball player & coach (born 1987)

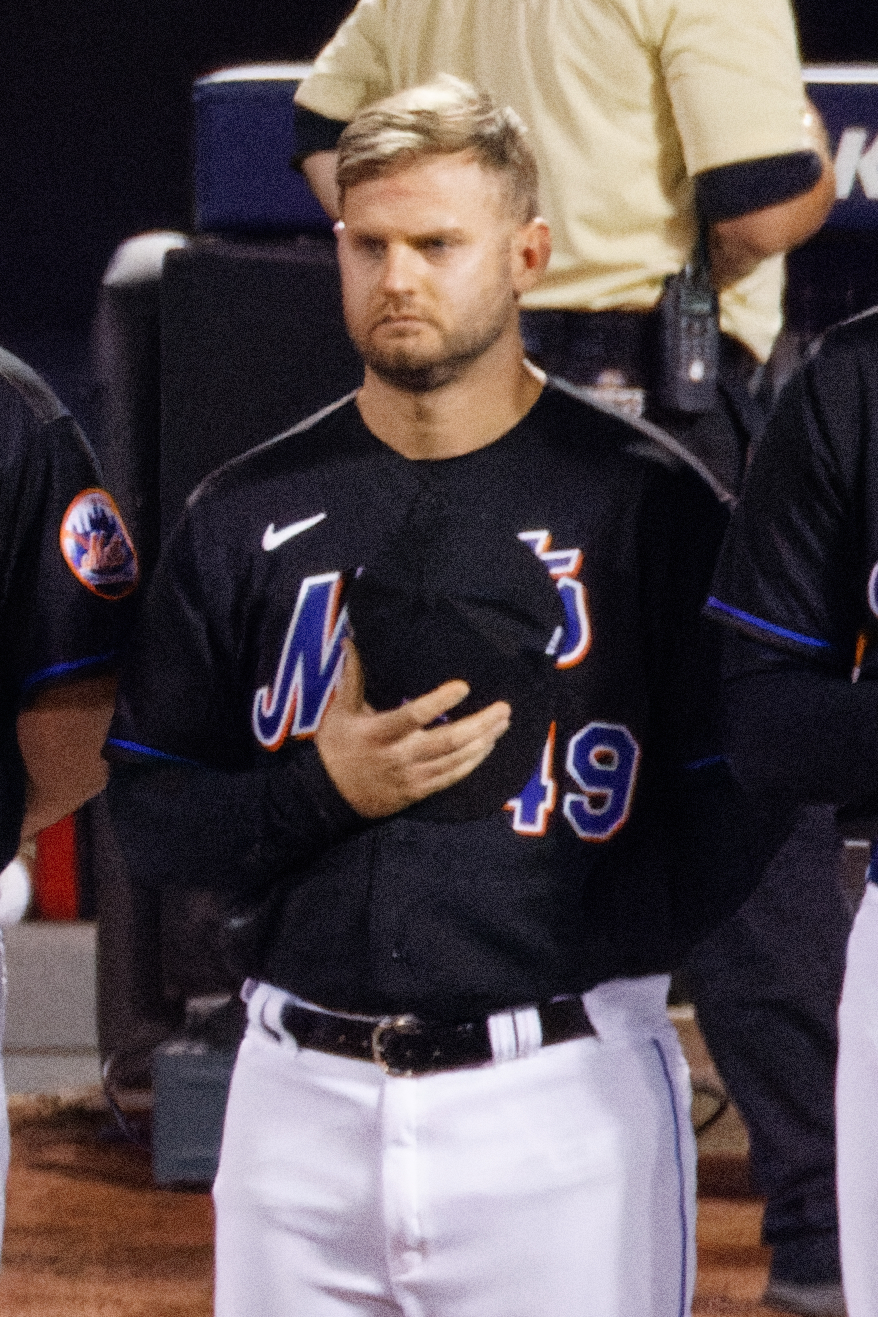
- Barnes with the Mets in 2022

Washington Nationals
- Infielder / Coach
- Born: April 13, 1987 (age 39); Rowlett, Texas, U.S.
- Bats: Right Throws: Right

Teams
- As coach: New York Mets (2022–2025); Washington Nationals (2026–present)

Jeremy David Barnes (born April 13, 1987) is an American former professional baseball infielder and current coach for the Washington Nationals of Major League Baseball (MLB). He has previously coached in MLB for the New York Mets.

== Playing career ==
Barnes attended South Garland High School in Garland, Texas. Barnes attended the University of Notre Dame and played college baseball for the Notre Dame Fighting Irish. He played professional baseball for the Philadelphia Phillies organization and in Australia from 2009 through 2015.

== Coaching career ==
After retiring as a player, Barnes began working on player development for the Canberra Cavalry of the Australian Baseball League. He spent four years working in the front office for the Houston Astros, including two years as their minor league hitting coordinator. The New York Mets interviewed Barnes for their position of director of playing development. Though they chose Kevin Howard, the Mets hired Barnes for the newly established position of director of player development initiative.

Before the 2022 season, the Mets promoted Barnes to their major league coaching staff as their assistant hitting coach. After the 2022 season, Eric Chavez was promoted to bench coach and Barnes became the head hitting coach. In 2024, Chavez moved back into the hitting coach role, and Chavez and Barnes worked as co-hitting coaches. Chavez and Barnes were fired after the 2025 season.

On January 1, 2026, the Washington Nationals hired Barnes to serve as their director of defense, baserunning, and game play for the 2026 season.

Sporting positions
Preceded by Eric Chavez	New York Mets hitting coach 2023–2025 (2024–2025) with Eric Chavez	Succeeded by Troy Snitker
Preceded by Kevin Howard	New York Mets assistant hitting coach 2022	Succeeded by Eric Hinske
