= Chili Davis =

Jamaican-American baseball player and coach (born 1960)

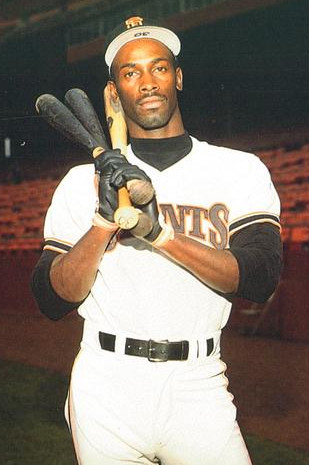
- Davis in 1983
- Outfielder / Designated hitter
- Born: January 17, 1960 (age 66); Kingston, Jamaica
- Batted: Switch Threw: Right

MLB debut
- April 10, 1981, for the San Francisco Giants

Last MLB appearance
- October 3, 1999, for the New York Yankees

MLB statistics
- Batting average: .274
- Hits: 2,380
- Home runs: 350
- Runs batted in: 1,372
- Stats at Baseball Reference

Teams
- As player: San Francisco Giants (1981–1987); California Angels (1988–1990); Minnesota Twins (1991–1992); California Angels (1993–1996); Kansas City Royals (1997); New York Yankees (1998–1999); As coach: Oakland Athletics (2012–2014); Boston Red Sox (2015–2017); Chicago Cubs (2018); New York Mets (2019–2021)

Career highlights and awards
- 3× All-Star (1984, 1986, 1994); 3× World Series champion (1991, 1998, 1999); San Francisco Giants Wall of Fame

Charles Theodore "Chili" Davis (born January 17, 1960) is a Jamaican-American former professional baseball player. He played as an outfielder and designated hitter from 1981 to 1999 for the San Francisco Giants (1981–1987), California Angels (1988–1990, 1993–1996), Minnesota Twins (1991–1992), Kansas City Royals (1997) and New York Yankees (1998–1999). His first MLB coaching position after his playing career was with the Oakland Athletics from 2012 to 2014. He also coached for the Boston Red Sox, Chicago Cubs and the New York Mets. Davis was a switch-hitter and threw right-handed. He is the first ballplayer born in Jamaica to appear in an MLB game (although Oscar Levis played in the Negro leagues).

== Early life ==
Born in Kingston, Jamaica, Davis moved with his three brothers and sister to Los Angeles at the age of 10. Davis originally attended Fremont High School before transferring to Susan Miller Dorsey High School in Los Angeles. In high school, Davis played catcher and first base. Prior to his first year in the minor leagues, Davis was exclusively a right-handed hitter.

== Professional career ==
In a 19-year career, Davis was a .274 hitter with 350 home runs and 1,372 RBI in 2,436 MLB games.

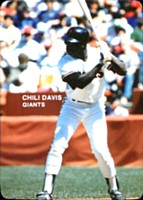
Davis batting for the Giants in 1985

Davis was an outfielder developed in the Giants minors system. In his first regular season in 1982, he hit .261 with 19 home runs, 76 RBI and 24 stolen bases, and also led all National League outfielders in assists. In 1984 Davis finished third in NL batting average (.315), behind Tony Gwynn (.351) and Lee Lacy (.321). When he led the league in fielding errors in 1986, his nine errors tied the major league record for fewest errors by a category leader. After seven seasons in San Francisco, including two All-Star appearances in 1984 and 1986, Davis signed with the Angels as a free agent before the 1988 season.

In his first two years with California, Davis hit 21 home runs with 93 RBI in 1988, and then 22 home runs with 90 RBI in 1989. In 1990, hampered by chronic back problems and defensive shortcomings, Davis moved from full-time outfield duty to a DH role. After signing with Minnesota the following year, Davis remained a DH and would do so for the rest of his career.

Davis contributed to the Twins with his switch-hitting ability, as the Twins' lineup already possessed right-handed batting Kirby Puckett and left-handed batting Kent Hrbek. Though he hit well from both sides of the plate, Davis performed better from the left side, as many switch hitters do as a result of facing more right-handed pitching. In 1991 he led the Twins in home runs (29), RBI (93), doubles (34), walks (95), intentional walks (13), times on base (244), pitches seen (2,469), games played (153), slugging average (.507), on-base percentage (.385), OPS (.892), home run frequency (18.4 at bat per home run), and most pitches seen per plate appearance (3.89). With these numbers, Davis helped Minnesota rise from a last-place finish the previous year to the AL West title. In the 1991 World Series, in which he hit two home runs, Davis and the Twins defeated the Atlanta Braves in seven games. Davis declined in production in 1992 (12 home runs and 66 RBI), and as a free agent the following year returned to the Angels.

Davis provided four years of solid production for California, including 27 home runs and a career-high 112 RBI in 1993. In 1994, he hit .311, with 26 home runs and 84 RBI, and appeared in the All-Star game in the strike-shortened 1994 season. In 1995, he hit .318 with 20 home runs and 86 RBI, and in 1996 hit .292, 28 home runs and 96 RBI. In 1997 he was traded to Kansas City for starter Mark Gubicza. In his one year with the Royals, Davis hit .279 with 90 RBI and a career-high 30 homers. Davis spent his final two seasons with the Yankees, winning his second and third World Series rings. In 1999, his final season, he hit .269 with 19 home runs and 78 RBI.

Davis finished his career with 350 home runs which ranks seventh all-time by a switch hitter, following Mickey Mantle, Eddie Murray, Chipper Jones, Mark Teixeira, Carlos Beltrán and Lance Berkman. Eleven times, Davis hit a home run from both sides of the plate in the same game and finished his career tied with Eddie Murray for first in this category, which has since been broken by Mark Teixeira, Nick Swisher and Carlos Beltrán.

Davis played in the outfield from 1981 to 1989. By 1990, he started to see more time as designated hitter in the American League. In 1993, he appeared as a pitcher for the only time in his career, pitching the final two innings of a game against the Texas Rangers. He faced seven batters, while allowing no runs, no hits, and surrendering no walks. However, he did hit batter Jose Canseco. Davis was specifically a designated hitter from 1995 to 1999, and did not log any innings in the field the final five seasons of his career.

=== Breakout performances ===
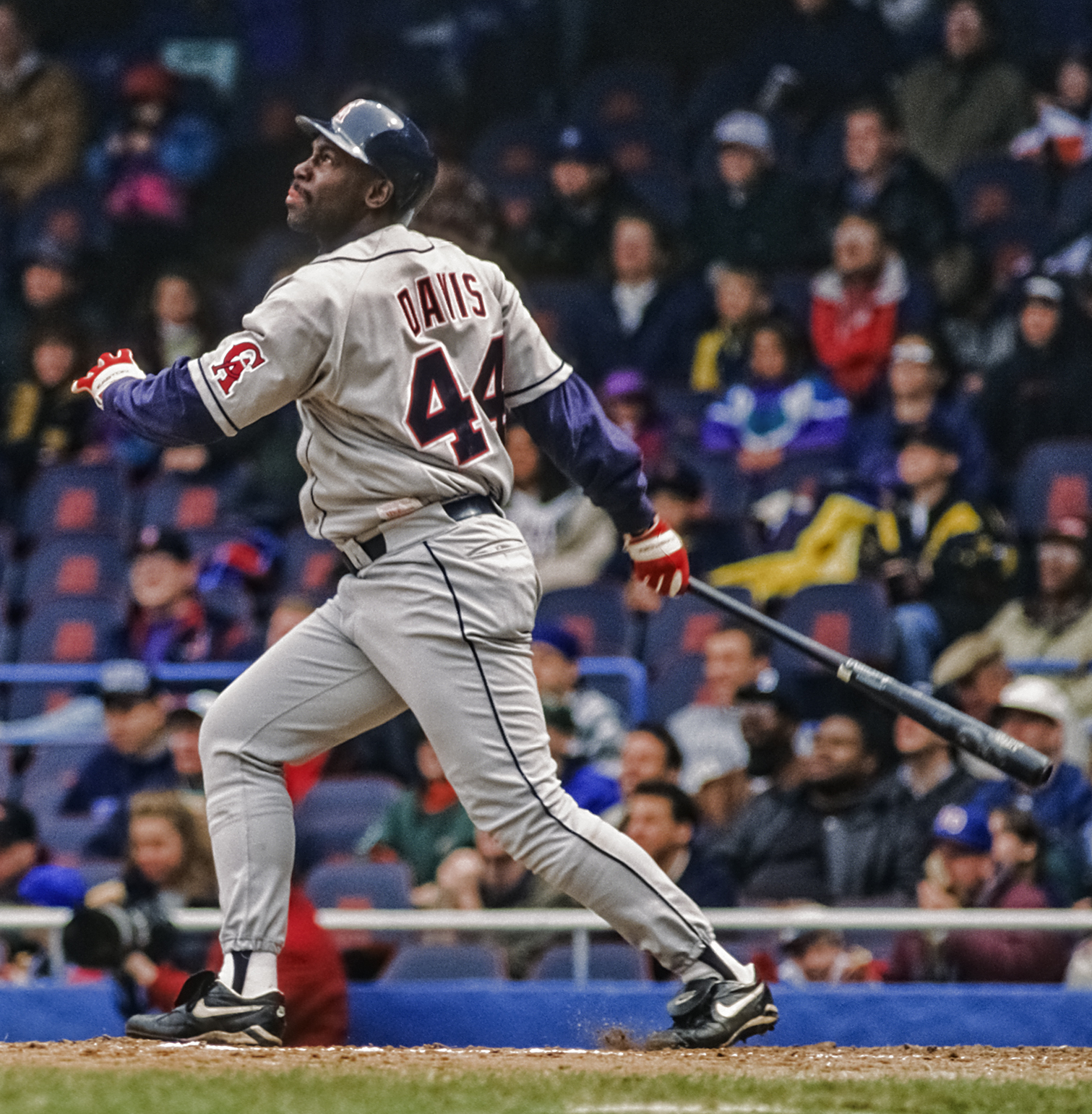
Davis with the Angels in 1996

- On August 2, 1984, Davis went a perfect 4-for-4 outdoing his teammates who only combined for three hits as the San Francisco Giants found a way to get past the Cincinnati Reds, 5–2. He also tripled while driving in 2 runs during the game which was played at Riverfront Stadium.
- On September 15, 1987, Davis got in a tune-up for the upcoming National League Championship Series with the St. Louis Cardinals by going 4-for-4 with 2 home runs and 4 RBI in a 13–3 regular season win over the San Diego Padres. He also scored 4 runs during the contest as his San Francisco Giants would soon wrap up a 90–72 record that season.

== Coaching career ==
Following his playing days, Davis was a hitting coach for the Australian National Baseball team for three years and was hired in 2010 by the Los Angeles Dodgers as a hitting coach for their instructional league. While there was speculation that he might join the Dodgers as a coach for the 2011 season, Davis instead joined the Pawtucket Red Sox's coaching staff as their new hitting coach. On November 25, 2011, Davis was hired to be the Oakland Athletics hitting coach. In October 2014, he returned to the east coast, as the hitting coach for the Boston Red Sox. On October 26, 2017, he was named hitting coach for the Chicago Cubs.

On October 11, 2018, Davis was relieved of duties as hitting coach for the Chicago Cubs. On November 28, 2018, Davis was named hitting coach for the New York Mets. He was fired by the Mets on May 3, 2021, 22 games in to the season. The team had scored the second-fewest runs per game in MLB.

== Personal life ==
Davis spends his time with his wife, Ann, and their three sons in Arizona and his family in California. He also has a sister named Olive who organized a fundraising event where Davis pitched to fund money for education.

The moniker "Chili" comes from Davis's childhood, when his father gave him a particularly poor bowl cut. Neighborhood children teased him that it looked as though someone had simply placed a chili bowl on his head to cut around, and the nickname stuck.

== See also ==
- List of Major League Baseball career hits leaders
- List of Major League Baseball career home run leaders
- List of Major League Baseball career doubles leaders
- List of Major League Baseball career runs scored leaders
- List of Major League Baseball career runs batted in leaders

Sporting positions
Preceded by Gerald Perry	Oakland Athletics hitting coach 2012–2014	Succeeded by Darren Bush
Preceded by Greg Colbrunn	Boston Red Sox hitting coach 2015–2017	Succeeded by Tim Hyers
Preceded by John Mallee	Chicago Cubs hitting coach 2018	Succeeded by Anthony Iapoce
Preceded by Pat Roessler	New York Mets hitting coach 2019–2021	Succeeded by Hugh Quattlebaum
