= Eric Chavez =

American baseball player and coach (born 1977)

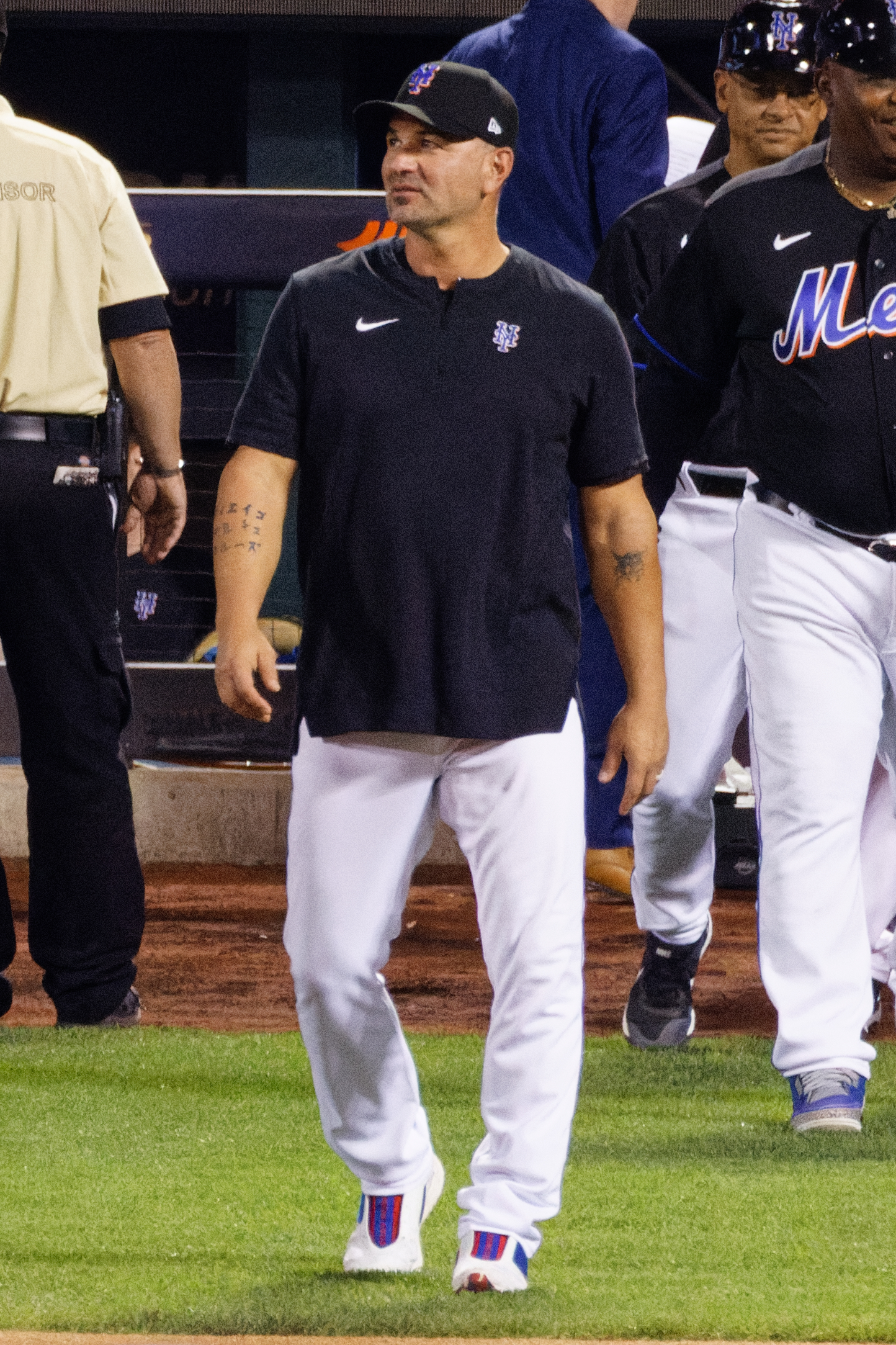
- Chavez with the Mets in 2022
- Third baseman
- Born: December 7, 1977 (age 48); Los Angeles, California, U.S.
- Batted: Left Threw: Right

MLB debut
- September 8, 1998, for the Oakland Athletics

Last MLB appearance
- June 8, 2014, for the Arizona Diamondbacks

MLB statistics
- Batting average: .268
- Home runs: 260
- Runs batted in: 902
- Stats at Baseball Reference

Teams
- As player: Oakland Athletics (1998–2010); New York Yankees (2011–2012); Arizona Diamondbacks (2013–2014); As coach: New York Mets (2022–2025)

Career highlights and awards
- 6× Gold Glove Award (2001–2006); Silver Slugger Award (2002); Athletics Hall of Fame

Eric Cesar Chavez (born December 7, 1977) is an American professional baseball coach and former third baseman. He played in Major League Baseball (MLB) for the Oakland Athletics (1998–2010), New York Yankees (2011–2012), and Arizona Diamondbacks (2013–2014). During his playing career, Chavez won six Gold Glove Awards (2001–2006) and a Silver Slugger Award (2002). Chavez served as the bench coach for the New York Mets during the 2023 season between stints as the hitting coach in 2022 and 2024-2025. In 2022, he was inducted into the Athletics Hall of Fame.

== Early life ==
Eric Cesar Chavez was born on December 7, 1977, in Los Angeles, California. Chavez was the second of four children born to Cesar and Ruby Chavez. Cesar, who was born in Mexico, was a custodian at an elementary school and Ruby worked at Rancho Bernardo High School. Chavez was baptized Catholic but his mother converted to Protestantism when he was eight or nine years old. Although all four of Chavez's grandparents were from Mexico, he did not learn to speak Spanish.

Chavez was an early childhood friend as well as a high school teammate of Eric Munson at Mt. Carmel High School in San Diego. They were among only ten players named to the USA Today All-USA high school baseball team. Chavez was also named to the ABCA/Rawlings High School All-America Second Team.

== Professional career ==
=== Minor leagues ===
The Oakland Athletics selected Chavez in the first round, with the tenth pick, of the 1996 Major League Baseball draft. Chavez eventually chose a professional baseball career over a full scholarship at the University of Southern California (USC), signing with the Athletics on August 27, 1996. His time in the minor leagues was relatively short, lasting just under two seasons. He spent the 1997 season playing for the Visalia Oaks, the Single-A team in the Athletics' farm system. He played 134 games, all at third base, and hit .271 with 18 home runs and 100 RBI.

Before the start of the 1998 season, Chavez was promoted to the Double-A Huntsville Stars. After 88 games, he had a batting average of .328, 28 home runs, 86 RBIs, 12 stolen bases, and a triple. His efforts caused him to be promoted to the Edmonton Trappers, where in 47 games he hit 11 home runs and had a .325 batting average. When Edmonton's season finished up on September 8, 1998, he was called up to the major leagues. He finished his minor league career by receiving both the Baseball America Minor League Player of the Year Award and the Topps Minor League Player of the Year Award.

=== Oakland Athletics (1998–2010) ===
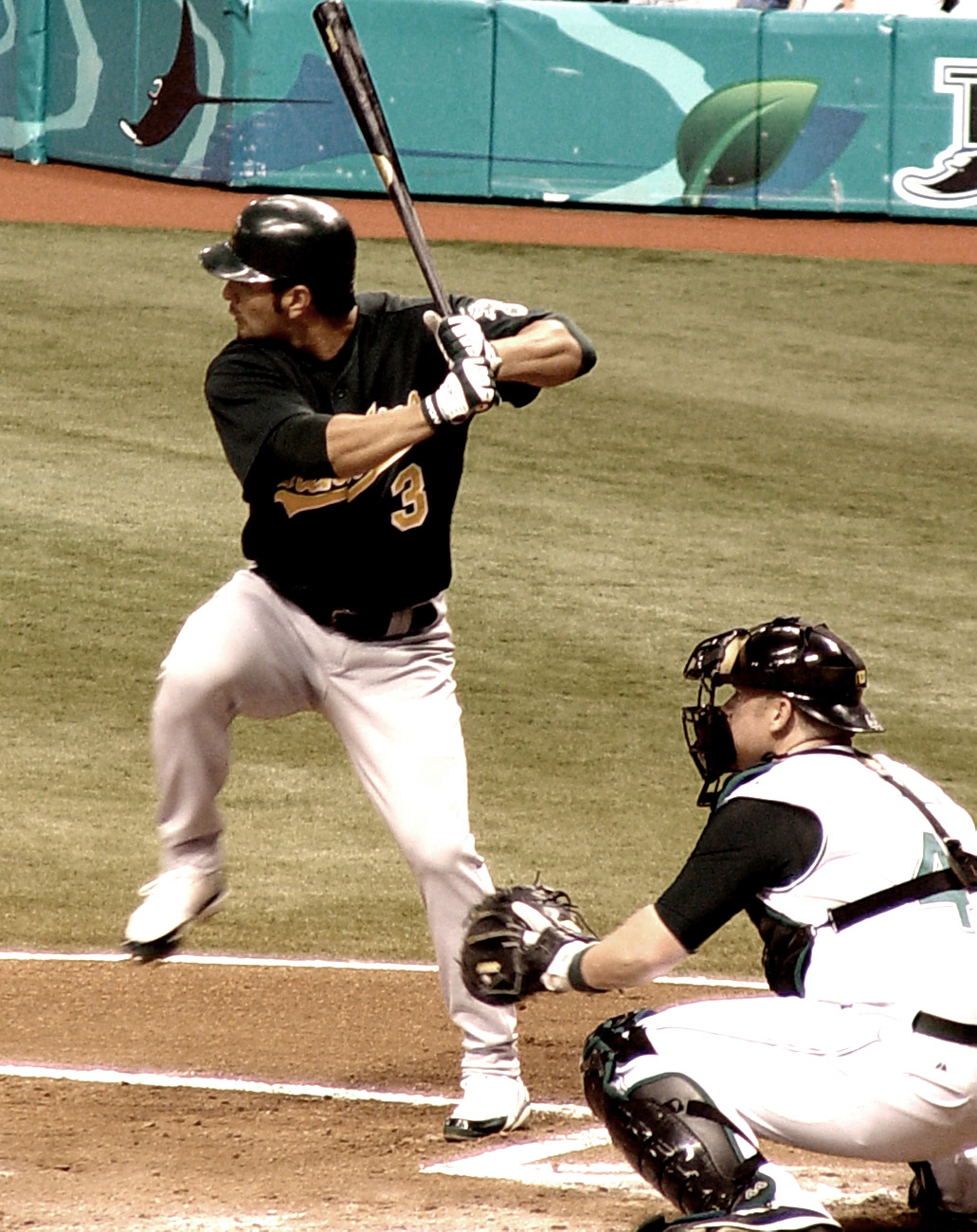
Chavez with the Athletics in 2005

He made his major league debut on September 8, 1998, in a game against the Baltimore Orioles, where he came in as a pinch hitter for Mike Blowers and struck out in his only at bat. He finished the 1998 season having played in 16 games, and ending with a .311 batting average, as well as a triple.

In the 27 games of September and October in 2001, Chavez hit ten home runs with 31 RBIs, a .379 batting average and a .738 slugging percentage resulting in him being named the American League Player of the Month for the only time in his career.

Chavez won six consecutive Rawlings Gold Glove Awards from 2001 to 2006. He was a part of the A's 20 consecutive game winning streak in 2002, during which he batted .338 with 6 home runs and 28 RBIs. In 2004, the Athletics signed him to a six-year, $66 million contract extension; it was the largest contract guarantee made by the Athletics. As of December 2022, the contract (equivalent to $112.5 million in 2025) remains the largest in franchise history.

Between 2002–2005, his batting average remained consistent, hitting in the .270–.280 range. His home runs hit remained steady, hitting 29 in 2003 and 2004, and 27 in 2005. However, his offense production dropped in 2006, with his batting average dropping to .241, despite hitting 22 home runs. This slump continued into 2007, hitting .240 and 15 home runs.

Through his first ten years with the A's, Chavez played 1256 games and batted .269. He had 227 home runs and 762 RBIs. Chavez batted .250 and slugged .445 in April and in May combined, but batted .294 and slugged .544 in June, July and August, continuing a constant theme in the Oakland A's organization in that they are a "second half" team.

He started the 2008 season on the disabled list, due to back pain. He was activated from the disabled list on May 29. On July 2, he was placed on the 15-day disabled list again with right shoulder inflammation. On June 14, 2009, Chavez was placed on the disabled list once again due to back pain, this time out for the season.

Chavez became a free agent at the conclusion of the 2010 season when the Oakland A's declined a club option to keep him on the roster for the 2011 season. He had the longest continuous tenure as an Athletic, at 13 years, and second overall total behind Rickey Henderson's 14 years.

=== New York Yankees (2011–2012) ===
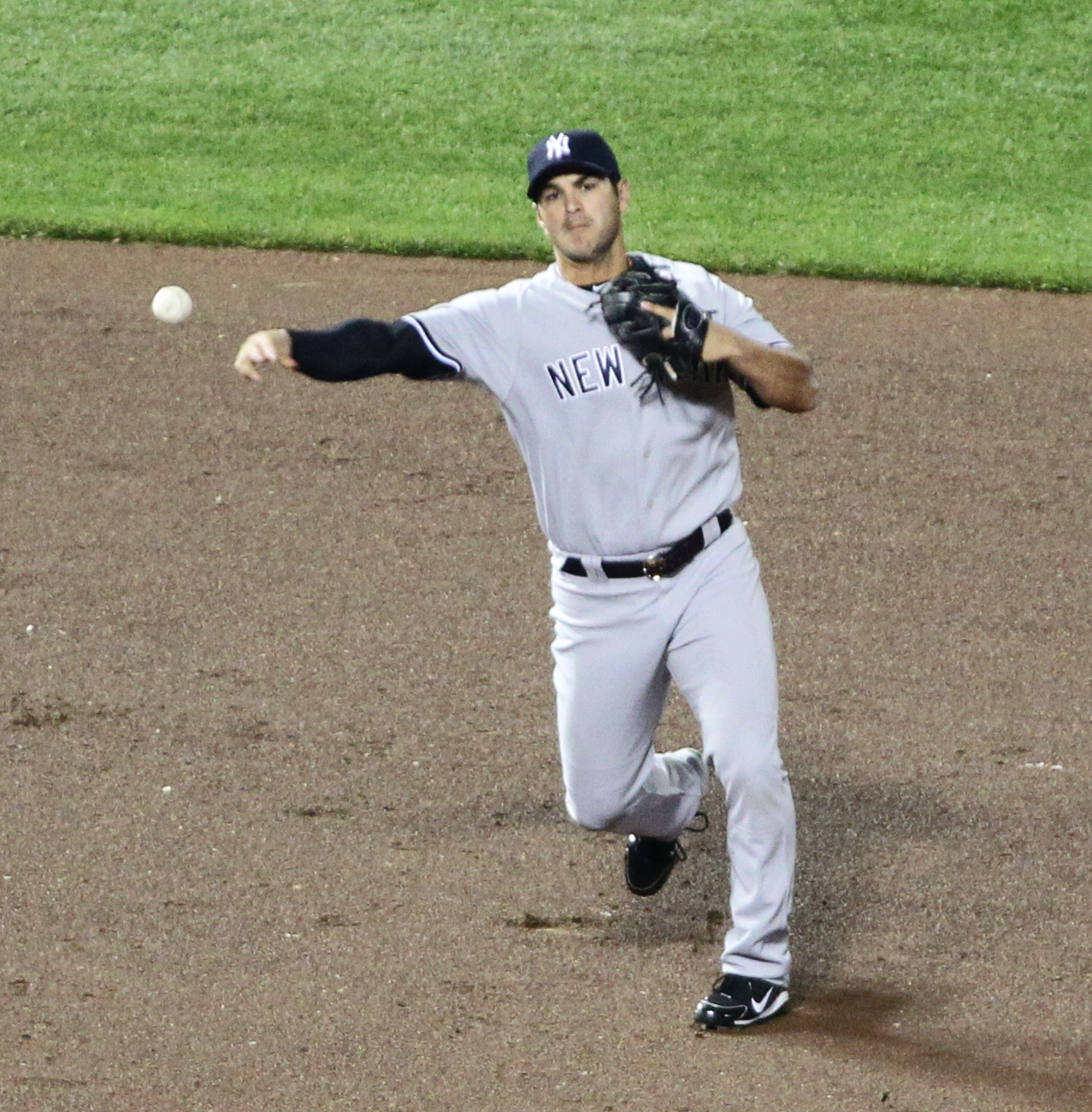
Chavez playing for the New York Yankees

On February 4, 2011, Chavez agreed to a minor league contract with the New York Yankees with an invitation to spring training for the 2011 season. The major league team purchased his contract on March 28, 2011. On May 5, Chavez broke a bone in his left foot while rounding second base in a game against the Detroit Tigers. He returned from the disabled list on July 26, and batted 8th for the Yankees against the Seattle Mariners. On August 3, Chavez hit his first home run as a Yankee, a two-run shot to right field against the Chicago White Sox.

On February 27, 2012, Chavez re-signed with the Yankees for one season. The contract guaranteed Chavez a salary of $900,000, with an additional $3.05 million in incentives based on plate appearances. Chavez suffered a minor concussion when diving for a ground ball during a game on May 2, 2012. He left the game and was placed on the seven-day disabled list for concussions. He returned to action on May 11. Chavez finished the 2012 season with 16 home runs in 113 games played. It was his highest total in both categories since 2006.

=== Arizona Diamondbacks (2013–2014) ===
Chavez agreed to a one-year contract worth $3 million with the Arizona Diamondbacks for the 2013 season. On June 1, 2013, Chavez was placed on the 15-day disabled list due to a minor right oblique tear. On December 19, 2013, Chavez re-signed with the Diamondbacks for $3.5 million. Chavez retired on July 30, 2014.

== Broadcasting career ==
On February 26, 2015, Chavez was hired as a part-time color analyst for Oakland A's telecasts on Comcast SportsNet California. At the time, USA Today reported that Chavez would team with play-by-play announcer Glen Kuiper to call 20 games during the 2015 season, and would also serve as a pre-game and post-game studio analyst for the channel.

== Executive career ==
Chavez served as a special assistant to Yankees executives Brian Cashman and Billy Eppler during the 2015 season. He was instrumental in scouting Didi Gregorius, his former teammate in Arizona, for the Yankees. When Eppler became the general manager of the Los Angeles Angels after the 2015 season, he hired Chavez as a special assistant. On August 5, 2018, the Salt Lake Bees announced that Chavez would replace Keith Johnson, who was promoted to the coaching staff of the Angels.

== Coaching career ==
On December 22, 2021, the Yankees announced they had hired Chavez as an assistant hitting coach. On January 6, 2022, however, the New York Mets hired Chavez away from the Yankees and named him their hitting coach. After the 2022 season, the Mets moved Chavez from hitting coach to bench coach, and Jeremy Barnes took over as hitting coach. Chavez was later moved back to the hitting coach position following the 2023 season. The Mets fired Barnes and Chavez after the 2025 season.

== See also ==
- List of Major League Baseball career home run leaders
- List of Major League Baseball players who hit for the cycle

Awards and achievements
Preceded by Jermaine Dye	American League Player of the Month; September 2001	Succeeded by Torii Hunter
Preceded by Mike Lansing	Hitting for the cycle June 21, 2000	Succeeded by Luis Gonzalez

Preceded by Hugh Quattlebaum	New York Mets hitting coach 2022	Succeeded by Jeremy Barnes
Preceded by Jeremy Barnes	New York Mets hitting coach 2024–2025	Succeeded by TBA
