= 1989 Minnesota Twins season =

1989 Minnesota Twins
- League: American League
- Division: West
- Ballpark: Hubert H. Humphrey Metrodome
- City: Minneapolis, Minnesota
- Record: 80–82 (.494)
- Divisional place: 5th
- Owners: Carl Pohlad
- General managers: Andy MacPhail
- Managers: Tom Kelly
- Television: WCCO-TV; Midwest Sports Channel (Jim Kaat, Ted Robinson, Dick Bremer)
- Radio: 830 WCCO AM (Herb Carneal, John Gordon)

The 1989 Minnesota Twins season was the 29th season for the Minnesota Twins franchise in the Twin Cities of Minnesota, their 8th season at Hubert H. Humphrey Metrodome and the 89th overall in the American League. The Twins finished 80–82, fifth in the American League West. 2,277,438 fans attended Twins games, the 7th highest total in the American League.

== Offseason ==
- October 24, 1988: Eric Bullock, Tom Herr and Tom Nieto were traded by the Twins to the Philadelphia Phillies for Shane Rawley and cash.
- November 3, 1988: Bert Blyleven and Kevin Trudeau (minors) were traded by the Twins to the California Angels for Mike Cook, Paul Sorrento, and Rob Wassenaar (minors).
- December 7, 1988: Jeff Bumgarner (minors), Steve Gasser (minors) and Toby Nivens (minors) were traded by the Twins to the New York Mets for Wally Backman and Mike Santiago (minors).
- December 12, 1988: Randy Bush was signed as a free agent by the Twins.
- December 21, 1988: John Christensen was released by the Twins.
- February 13, 1989: Lee Tunnell was signed as a free agent by the Twins.
- March 26, 1989: Keith Atherton was traded by the Minnesota Twins to the Cleveland Indians for Carmelo Castillo.

== Regular season ==
Kirby Puckett tied a major league record when, on May 13, he hit four doubles in a game against the Toronto Blue Jays. He was the thirty-fifth player to accomplish the feat.

When Jeff Reardon got his 30th save on September 14, he became the first major leaguer to reach 30 saves in five consecutive seasons.

=== Offense ===
Puckett led the AL in batting with a .339 average and hits with 215. Kirby hit 9 HR, drove in 85 runs, scored 75, and was rewarded with a Silver Slugger Award. Kent Hrbek hit .272 with 25 HR and 84 RBI. Gary Gaetti hit 19 HR and 75 RBI. Al Newman led the team with 25 stolen bases.

Team Leaders
| Statistic | Player | Quantity |
|---|---|---|
| HR | Kent Hrbek | 25 |
| RBI | Kirby Puckett | 85 |
| BA | Kirby Puckett | .339* |
| Runs | Kirby Puckett | 75 |

*League leader

=== Pitching ===
Only two Twins had double digit wins: Allan Anderson (17–10) and Roy Smith (10–6). Frank Viola was 8–12 before being traded to the New York Mets on July 31. Reliever Jeff Reardon had 31 saves.

Team Leaders
| Statistic | Player | Quantity |
|---|---|---|
| ERA | Frank Viola | 3.79 |
| Wins | Allan Anderson | 17 |
| Saves | Jeff Reardon | 31 |
| Strikeouts | Frank Viola | 138 |

=== Defense ===
Third baseman Gary Gaetti and center fielder Kirby Puckett each won their fourth Gold Glove Award.

=== Season standings ===
AL West
| Team | W | L | Pct. | GB | Home | Road |
|---|---|---|---|---|---|---|
| Oakland Athletics | 99 | 63 | .611 | — | 54‍–‍27 | 45‍–‍36 |
| Kansas City Royals | 92 | 70 | .568 | 7 | 55‍–‍26 | 37‍–‍44 |
| California Angels | 91 | 71 | .562 | 8 | 52‍–‍29 | 39‍–‍42 |
| Texas Rangers | 83 | 79 | .512 | 16 | 45‍–‍36 | 38‍–‍43 |
| Minnesota Twins | 80 | 82 | .494 | 19 | 45‍–‍36 | 35‍–‍46 |
| Seattle Mariners | 73 | 89 | .451 | 26 | 40‍–‍41 | 33‍–‍48 |
| Chicago White Sox | 69 | 92 | .429 | 29½ | 35‍–‍45 | 34‍–‍47 |

=== Record vs. opponents ===
1989 American League record Sources:
| Team | BAL | BOS | CAL | CWS | CLE | DET | KC | MIL | MIN | NYY | OAK | SEA | TEX | TOR |
|---|---|---|---|---|---|---|---|---|---|---|---|---|---|---|
| Baltimore | — | 6–7 | 6–6 | 6–6 | 7–6 | 10–3 | 6–6 | 7–6 | 4–8 | 8–5 | 5–7 | 6–6 | 9–3 | 7–6 |
| Boston | 7–6 | — | 4–8 | 7–5 | 8–5 | 11–2 | 4–8 | 6–7 | 6–6 | 7–6 | 7–5 | 5–7 | 6–6 | 5–8 |
| California | 6–6 | 8–4 | — | 8–5 | 5–7 | 11–1 | 4–9 | 7–5 | 11–2 | 6–6 | 5–8 | 7–6 | 6–7 | 7–5 |
| Chicago | 6–6 | 5–7 | 5–8 | — | 7–5 | 4–8 | 6–7 | 10–2 | 5–8 | 5–6 | 5–8 | 7–6 | 3–10 | 1–11 |
| Cleveland | 6–7 | 5–8 | 7–5 | 5–7 | — | 5–8 | 8–4 | 3–10 | 5–7 | 9–4 | 2–10 | 6–6 | 7–5 | 5–8 |
| Detroit | 3–10 | 2–11 | 1–11 | 8–4 | 8–5 | — | 6–6 | 6–7 | 5–7 | 6–7 | 4–8 | 4–8 | 4–8 | 2–11 |
| Kansas City | 6–6 | 8–4 | 9–4 | 7–6 | 4–8 | 6–6 | — | 8–4 | 7–6 | 6–6 | 7–6 | 9–4 | 8–5 | 7–5 |
| Milwaukee | 6–7 | 7–6 | 5–7 | 2–10 | 10–3 | 7–6 | 4–8 | — | 9–3 | 8–5 | 5–7 | 7–5 | 5–7 | 6–7 |
| Minnesota | 8–4 | 6–6 | 2–11 | 8–5 | 7–5 | 7–5 | 6–7 | 3–9 | — | 6–6 | 6–7 | 7–6 | 5–8 | 9–3 |
| New York | 5–8 | 6–7 | 6–6 | 6–5 | 4–9 | 7–6 | 6–6 | 5–8 | 6–6 | — | 3–9 | 8–4 | 5–7 | 7–6 |
| Oakland | 7–5 | 5–7 | 8–5 | 8–5 | 10–2 | 8–4 | 6–7 | 7–5 | 7–6 | 9–3 | — | 9–4 | 8–5 | 7–5 |
| Seattle | 6–6 | 7–5 | 6–7 | 6–7 | 6–6 | 8–4 | 4–9 | 5–7 | 6–7 | 4–8 | 4–9 | — | 6–7 | 5–7 |
| Texas | 3–9 | 6–6 | 7–6 | 10–3 | 5–7 | 8–4 | 5–8 | 7–5 | 8–5 | 7–5 | 5–8 | 7–6 | — | 5–7 |
| Toronto | 6–7 | 8–5 | 5–7 | 11–1 | 8–5 | 11–2 | 5–7 | 7–6 | 3–9 | 6–7 | 5–7 | 7–5 | 7–5 | — |

=== Notable transactions ===
- April 1, 1989: Randy St. Claire was signed as a free agent by the Twins.
- June 5, 1989: 1989 Major League Baseball draft
  - Chuck Knoblauch was drafted by the Twins in the 1st round (25th pick). Player signed June 9, 1989.
  - Denny Neagle was drafted by the Twins in the 3rd round. Player signed June 22, 1989.
  - Dan Masteller was drafted by the Twins in the 11th round.
  - Denny Hocking was drafted by the Twins in the 52nd round. Player signed May 15, 1990.
- June 29, 1989: Freddie Toliver was traded by the Twins to the San Diego Padres for Greg Booker.

=== Roster ===
1989 Minnesota Twins
Roster
| Pitchers: 17 Rick Aguilera; 49 Allan Anderson; 40 Juan Berenguer; 51 Greg Booker; 33 Mike Cook; 54 Tim Drummond; 39 Mike Dyer; 46 Germán González; 53 Mark Guthrie; 30 Francisco Oliveras; 18 Shane Rawley; 41 Jeff Reardon; 36 Steve Shields; 23 Roy Smith; 38 Randy St. Claire; 36 Kevin Tapani; 31 Freddie Toliver; 27 Lee Tunnell; 16 Frank Viola; 47 Gary Wayne; 50 David West | Catchers: 12 Brian Harper; 15 Tim Laudner; 4 Orlando Mercado; 11 Greg Olson; 52 Lenny Webster; Infielders: 2 Wally Backman; 21 Doug Baker; 8 Gary Gaetti; 7 Greg Gagne; 58 Chip Hale; 14 Kent Hrbek; 56 Terry Jorgensen; 9 Gene Larkin; 26 Al Newman; 20 Vic Rodriguez; 55 Paul Sorrento | Outfielders: 25 Randy Bush; 22 Carmen Castillo; 5 Jim Dwyer; 32 Dan Gladden; 1 John Moses; 34 Kirby Puckett | Manager: 10 Tom Kelly; Coaches: 6 Tony Oliva; 44 Rick Renick; 43 Rick Stelmaszek; 42 Dick Such; 45 Wayne Terwilliger |

== Player stats ==
| = Indicates team leader |

| = Indicates league leader |

=== Batting ===
==== Starters by position ====
Note: Pos = Position; G = Games played; AB = At bats; H = Hits; Avg. = Batting average; HR = Home runs; RBI = Runs batted in

| Pos | Player | G | AB | H | Avg. | HR | RBI |
|---|---|---|---|---|---|---|---|
| C | Brian Harper | 126 | 385 | 125 | .325 | 8 | 57 |
| 1B | Kent Hrbek | 109 | 375 | 102 | .272 | 25 | 84 |
| 2B | Wally Backman | 87 | 299 | 69 | .231 | 1 | 26 |
| 3B | Gary Gaetti | 130 | 498 | 125 | .251 | 19 | 75 |
| SS | Greg Gagne | 149 | 460 | 125 | .272 | 9 | 48 |
| LF | Dan Gladden | 120 | 461 | 136 | .295 | 8 | 46 |
| CF | Kirby Puckett | 159 | 635 | 215 | .339 | 9 | 85 |
| RF | Randy Bush | 141 | 391 | 103 | .263 | 14 | 54 |
| DH | Jim Dwyer | 88 | 225 | 71 | .316 | 3 | 23 |

==== Other batters ====
Note: G = Games pitched; AB = At bats; H = Hits; Avg. = Batting average; HR = Home runs; RBI = Runs batted in

| Player | G | AB | H | Avg. | HR | RBI |
|---|---|---|---|---|---|---|
| Al Newman | 141 | 446 | 113 | .253 | 0 | 38 |
| Gene Larkin | 136 | 446 | 119 | .267 | 6 | 46 |
| John Moses | 129 | 242 | 68 | .281 | 1 | 31 |
| Tim Laudner | 100 | 239 | 53 | .222 | 6 | 27 |
| Carmen Castillo | 94 | 218 | 56 | .257 | 8 | 33 |
| Doug Baker | 43 | 78 | 23 | .295 | 0 | 9 |
| Chip Hale | 28 | 67 | 14 | .209 | 0 | 4 |
| Orlando Mercado | 19 | 38 | 4 | .105 | 0 | 1 |
| Terry Jorgensen | 10 | 23 | 4 | .174 | 0 | 2 |
| Paul Sorrento | 14 | 21 | 5 | .238 | 0 | 1 |
| Lenny Webster | 14 | 20 | 6 | .300 | 0 | 1 |
| Vic Rodriguez | 6 | 11 | 5 | .455 | 0 | 0 |
| Greg Olson | 3 | 2 | 1 | .500 | 0 | 0 |

=== Pitching ===
==== Starting pitchers ====
Note: G = Games pitched; IP = Innings pitched; W = Wins; L = Losses; ERA = Earned run average; SO = Strikeouts

| Player | G | IP | W | L | ERA | SO |
|---|---|---|---|---|---|---|
| Allan Anderson | 33 | 196.2 | 17 | 10 | 3.80 | 69 |
| Frank Viola | 24 | 175.2 | 8 | 12 | 3.79 | 138 |
| Roy Smith | 32 | 172.1 | 10 | 6 | 3.92 | 92 |
| Shane Rawley | 27 | 145.0 | 5 | 12 | 5.21 | 68 |
| Rick Aguilera | 11 | 75.2 | 3 | 5 | 3.21 | 57 |
| Mike Dyer | 16 | 71.0 | 4 | 7 | 4.82 | 37 |
| Kevin Tapani | 5 | 32.2 | 2 | 2 | 3.86 | 21 |

==== Other pitchers ====
Note: G = Games pitched; IP = Innings pitched; W = Wins; L = Losses; ERA = Earned run average; SO = Strikeouts

| Player | G | IP | W | L | ERA | SO |
|---|---|---|---|---|---|---|
| Mark Guthrie | 13 | 57.1 | 2 | 4 | 4.55 | 38 |
| Francisco Oliveras | 12 | 55.2 | 3 | 4 | 4.53 | 24 |
| David West | 10 | 39.1 | 3 | 2 | 6.41 | 31 |
| Freddie Toliver | 7 | 29.0 | 1 | 3 | 7.76 | 11 |

==== Relief pitchers ====
Note: G = Games pitched; W = Wins; L = Losses; SV = Saves; ERA = Earned run average; SO = Strikeouts

| Player | G | W | L | SV | ERA | SO |
|---|---|---|---|---|---|---|
| Jeff Reardon | 65 | 5 | 4 | 31 | 4.07 | 46 |
| Gary Wayne | 60 | 3 | 4 | 1 | 3.30 | 41 |
| Juan Berenguer | 56 | 9 | 3 | 3 | 3.48 | 93 |
| Germán González | 22 | 3 | 2 | 0 | 4.66 | 25 |
| Mike Cook | 15 | 0 | 1 | 0 | 5.06 | 15 |
| Randy St. Claire | 14 | 1 | 0 | 1 | 5.24 | 14 |
| Steve Shields | 11 | 0 | 1 | 0 | 7.79 | 12 |
| Lee Tunnell | 10 | 1 | 0 | 0 | 6.00 | 7 |
| Tim Drummond | 8 | 0 | 0 | 1 | 3.86 | 9 |
| Greg Booker | 6 | 0 | 0 | 0 | 4.15 | 3 |
| Dan Gladden | 1 | 0 | 0 | 0 | 9.00 | 0 |
| John Moses | 1 | 0 | 0 | 0 | 0.00 | 0 |

== Awards and honors ==
- Kirby Puckett – American League Batting Champion (.339)
- Gary Gaetti – Gold Glove Award winner, third base
- Kirby Puckett – Gold Glove Award winner, center field
- Kirby Puckett – Silver Slugger Award, outfield

All-Star Game

- Gary Gaetti, third base, reserve
- Kirby Puckett, outfield, starter

== Farm system ==
| Level | Team | League | Manager |
|---|---|---|---|
| AAA | Portland Beavers | Pacific Coast League | Phil Roof |
| AA | Orlando Twins | Southern League | Ron Gardenhire |
| A | Visalia Oaks | California League | Scott Ullger |
| A | Kenosha Twins | Midwest League | Steve Liddle |
| Rookie | Elizabethton Twins | Appalachian League | Ray Smith |
| Rookie | GCL Twins | Gulf Coast League | Joel Lepel |

LEAGUE CHAMPIONS: Elizabethton
