= 1990 Minnesota Twins season =

1990 Minnesota Twins
- League: American League
- Division: West
- Ballpark: Hubert H. Humphrey Metrodome
- City: Minneapolis
- Record: 74–88 (.457)
- Divisional place: 7th
- Owners: Carl Pohlad
- General managers: Andy MacPhail
- Managers: Tom Kelly
- Television: WCCO-TV; KITN; Midwest Sports Channel (Jim Kaat, Ted Robinson, Dick Bremer)
- Radio: 830 WCCO AM (Herb Carneal, John Gordon)

The 1990 Minnesota Twins season was the 30th season for the Minnesota Twins franchise in the Twin Cities of Minnesota, their 9th season at Hubert H. Humphrey Metrodome and the 90th overall in the American League. Three years after their World Series title in 1987, the team fell to the bottom of the American League West once again. However, the season had some bright spots that included pitchers Rick Aguilera and Scott Erickson. Aguilera was converted from a starter to a closer and recorded 32 saves, while Erickson was promoted to the Twins in June from the team's AA affiliate and went 8–4 with a 3.27 ERA. During Fan Appreciation Day on October 3, Outfielder Dan Gladden made a prediction saying that even though we finished in last place this season, we're going to improve next season and if we did, they could potentially bring another World Series championship to Minnesota. His prediction proved accurate the next year.

== Offseason ==
- December 4, 1989: Drafted Shane Mack from the San Diego Padres in the 1989 Rule 5 draft.
- December 6, 1989: Signed Kent Hrbek as a free agent.
- January 8, 1990: Carmelo Castillo was signed as a free agent with the Minnesota Twins.

== Regular season ==
- The lone representative of the Twins in the All-Star Game was center fielder Kirby Puckett.
- The highest paid Twin in 1990 was Puckett at $2,816,667; followed by Kent Hrbek at $2,100,000.

=== Offense ===
Team Leaders
Statistic	Player	Quantity
HR	Kent Hrbek	22
RBI	Gary Gaetti	85
BA	Kirby Puckett	.298
Runs	Kirby Puckett	82

=== Pitching ===
Team Leaders
Statistic	Player	Quantity
ERA	Allan Anderson	4.53
Wins	Kevin Tapani	12
Saves	Rick Aguilera	32
Strikeouts	Mark Guthrie, Kevin Tapani	101

=== Defense ===
The highlight of the season came on July 17, in Boston, when the Twins turned two triple plays. In the 4th inning, with the bases loaded and Scott Erickson pitching, former Twin Tom Brunansky hit a sharp grounder to Gary Gaetti at third base, who stepped on the bag for the force out, fired to Al Newman at second, whose relay to Kent Hrbek was in time to get Brunansky at first. In the 8th inning, with John Candelaria pitching and runners on first and second, Jody Reed hit a one-hopper at Gaetti who again started a 5-4-3 triple play. This was the first time in MLB history that two triple plays were recorded in a game, a feat that has not been duplicated since.

The following night, still in Boston, both teams combined for an MLB-record-tying ten double plays. Boston tied an American League record by grounding into six DPs in the game, only escaping the twin killings in the sixth and seventh innings.

Both games were won by Boston.

=== Season standings ===
AL West
Team	W	L	Pct.	GB	Home	Road
Oakland Athletics	103	59	.636	—	51‍–‍30	52‍–‍29
Chicago White Sox	94	68	.580	9	49‍–‍31	45‍–‍37
Texas Rangers	83	79	.512	20	47‍–‍35	36‍–‍44
California Angels	80	82	.494	23	42‍–‍39	38‍–‍43
Seattle Mariners	77	85	.475	26	38‍–‍43	39‍–‍42
Kansas City Royals	75	86	.466	27½	45‍–‍36	30‍–‍50
Minnesota Twins	74	88	.457	29	41‍–‍40	33‍–‍48

=== Record vs. opponents ===
1990 American League record Sources:
Team	BAL	BOS	CAL	CWS	CLE	DET	KC	MIL	MIN	NYY	OAK	SEA	TEX	TOR
Baltimore	—	4–9	7–5	6–6	6–7	6–7	8–3	7–6	6–6	6–7	4–8	3–9	8–4	5–8
Boston	9–4	—	7–5	6–6	9–4	8–5	4–8	5–8	4–8	9–4	4–8	8–4	5–7	10–3
California	5–7	5–7	—	5–8	7–5	5–7	7–6	7–5	9–4	6–6	4–9	5–8	8–5	7–5
Chicago	6–6	6–6	8–5	—	5–7	5–7	9–4	10–2	7–6	10–2	8–5	8–5	7–6	5–7
Cleveland	7–6	4–9	5–7	7–5	—	5–8	6–6	9–4	7–5	5–8	4–8	7–5	7–5	4–9
Detroit	7–6	5–8	7–5	7–5	8–5	—	5–7	3–10	6–6	7–6	6–6	7–5	6–6	5–8
Kansas City	3–8	8–4	6–7	4–9	6–6	7–5	—	4–8	8–5	8–4	4–9	7–6	5–8	5–7
Milwaukee	6–7	8–5	5–7	2–10	4–9	10–3	8–4	—	4–8	6–7	5–7	4–8	5–7	7–6
Minnesota	6–6	8–4	4–9	6–7	5–7	6–6	5–8	8–4	—	6–6	6–7	6–7	5–8	3–9
New York	7–6	4–9	6–6	2–10	8–5	6–7	4–8	7–6	6–6	—	0–12	9–3	3–9	5–8
Oakland	8–4	8–4	9–4	5–8	8–4	6–6	9–4	7–5	7–6	12–0	—	9–4	8–5	7–5
Seattle	9–3	4–8	8–5	5–8	5–7	5–7	6–7	8–4	7–6	3–9	4–9	—	7–6	6–6
Texas	4–8	7–5	5–8	6–7	5–7	6–6	8–5	7–5	8–5	9–3	5–8	6–7	—	7–5
Toronto	8–5	3–10	5–7	7–5	9–4	8–5	7–5	6–7	9–3	8–5	5–7	6–6	5–7	—

=== Roster ===
1990 Minnesota Twins
Roster
Pitchers: 37 Paul Abbott; 38 Rick Aguilera; 49 Allan Anderson; 40 Juan Berenguer; 35 John Candelaria; 19 Larry Casian; 54 Tim Drummond; 46 Scott Erickson; 41 Rich Garces; 53 Mark Guthrie; 30 Terry Leach; 20 Jack Savage; 23 Roy Smith; 36 Kevin Tapani; 47 Gary Wayne; 50 David West; 41 Rich Yett	Catchers: 12 Brian Harper; 0 Junior Ortiz; 52 Lenny Webster; Infielders: 21 Doug Baker; 8 Gary Gaetti; 7 Greg Gagne; 4 Chip Hale; 14 Kent Hrbek; 31 Scott Leius; 2 Nelson Liriano; 17 Fred Manrique; 26 Al Newman; 55 Paul Sorrento	Outfielders: 25 Randy Bush; 22 Carmen Castillo; 32 Dan Gladden; 9 Gene Larkin; 24 Shane Mack; 1 John Moses; 5 Pedro Muñoz; 34 Kirby Puckett; Other batters: 5 Jim Dwyer	Manager: 10 Tom Kelly; Coaches: 6 Tony Oliva; 44 Rick Renick; 43 Rick Stelmaszek; 42 Dick Such; 45 Wayne Terwilliger

=== Notable Transactions ===
- April 4: Traded Mike Pomeranz (minors) to the Pittsburgh Pirates. Received Junior Ortiz and Orlando Lind (minors).
- June 4, 1990: Midre Cummings was drafted by the Minnesota Twins in the 1st round (29th pick) of the 1990 amateur draft. Player signed June 12, 1990.
- June 4, 1990: Jayhawk Owens was drafted by the Minnesota Twins in the 2nd round of the 1990 amateur draft. Player signed June 12, 1990.
- June 4: Drafted Eddie Guardado in the 21st round of the 1990 amateur draft. Player signed May 23, 1991.
- July 27: Traded John Candelaria to the Toronto Blue Jays. Received Nelson Liriano and Pedro Muñoz.
- December 18: Randy Bush was signed as a free agent with the Minnesota Twins.

== Player stats ==
=== Starters by position ===
Note: Pos = Position; G = Games played; AB = At bats; H = Hits; Avg. = Batting average; HR = Home runs; RBI = Runs batted in

Pos	Player	G	AB	H	Avg.	HR	RBI
C	Brian Harper	134	479	141	.294	6	54
1B	Kent Hrbek	143	492	141	.287	22	79
2B	Al Newman	144	388	94	.242	0	30
3B	Gary Gaetti	154	577	132	.229	16	85
SS	Greg Gagne	138	388	91	.235	7	38
LF	Dan Gladden	136	534	147	.275	5	40
CF	Kirby Puckett	146	551	164	.298	12	80
RF	Shane Mack	125	313	102	.326	8	44
DH	Gene Larkin	119	401	108	.269	5	42

==== Other batters ====
Note: G = Games played; AB = At bats; H = Hits; Avg. = Batting average; HR = Home runs; RBI = Runs batted in

Player	G	AB	H	Avg.	HR	RBI
Fred Manrique	69	228	54	.237	5	29
Nelson Liriano	53	185	47	.254	0	13
Randy Bush	73	181	44	.243	6	18
John Moses	115	172	38	.221	1	14
Junior Ortiz	71	170	57	.335	0	18
Carmelo Castillo	64	137	30	.219	0	12
Paul Sorrento	41	121	25	.207	5	13
Pedro Muñoz	22	85	23	.271	0	5
Jim Dwyer	37	63	12	.190	1	5
Scott Leius	14	25	6	.240	1	4
Lenny Webster	2	6	2	.333	0	0
Chip Hale	1	2	0	.000	0	2
Doug Baker	3	1	0	.000	0	0

=== Starting pitchers ===
Note: G = Games pitched; IP = Innings pitched; W = Wins; L = Losses; ERA = Earned run average; SO = Strikeouts

Player	G	IP	W	L	ERA	SO
Allan Anderson	31	188.2	7	18	4.53	82
Kevin Tapani	28	159.1	12	8	4.07	101
David West	29	146.1	7	9	5.10	92
Mark Guthrie	24	144.2	7	9	3.79	101
Scott Erickson	19	113.0	8	4	2.87	53
Paul Abbott	7	34.2	0	5	5.97	25

==== Other pitchers ====
Note: G = Games pitched; IP = Innings pitched; W = Wins; L = Losses; ERA = Earned run average; SO = Strikeouts

Player	G	IP	W	L	ERA	SO
Roy Smith	32	153.1	5	10	4.81	87
Tim Drummond	35	91.0	3	5	4.35	49
Larry Casian	5	22.1	2	1	3.22	11

===== Relief pitchers =====
Note: G = Games pitched; W = Wins; L = Losses; SV = Saves; ERA = Earned run average; SO = Strikeouts

Player	G	W	L	SV	ERA	SO
Rick Aguilera	56	5	3	32	2.76	61
Terry Leach	55	2	5	2	3.20	46
Juan Berenguer	51	8	5	0	3.41	77
Gary Wayne	38	1	1	1	4.19	28
John Candelaria	34	7	3	4	3.39	44
Jack Savage	17	0	2	1	8.31	12
Rich Garcés	5	0	0	2	1.59	1
Rich Yett	4	0	0	0	2.08	2
John Moses	2	0	0	0	13.50	0

== Farm system ==
Level	Team	League	Manager
AAA	Portland Beavers	Pacific Coast League	Phil Roof
AA	Orlando Sun Rays	Southern League	Ron Gardenhire
A	Visalia Oaks	California League	Scott Ullger
A	Kenosha Twins	Midwest League	Steve Liddle
Rookie	Elizabethton Twins	Appalachian League	Ray Smith
Rookie	GCL Twins	Gulf Coast League	Joel Lepel

LEAGUE CHAMPIONS: Elizabethton
