= Gene Larkin =

American baseball player (born 1962)

- First baseman / Right fielder / Designated hitter
- Born: October 24, 1962 (age 63); Flushing, New York, U.S.
- Batted: Switch Threw: Right

MLB debut
- May 21, 1987, for the Minnesota Twins

Last MLB appearance
- August 11, 1993, for the Minnesota Twins

MLB statistics
- Batting average: .266
- Home runs: 32
- Runs batted in: 266
- Stats at Baseball Reference

Teams
- Minnesota Twins (1987–1993)

Career highlights and awards
- 2× World Series champion (1987, 1991)

Eugene Thomas Larkin (born October 24, 1962) is an American former switch-hitting first baseman, designated hitter, and right fielder in Major League Baseball who played his entire seven-season career with the Minnesota Twins. During his playing career he wore No. 9 for Minnesota, and was a member of both the 1987 and 1991 World Series championship teams. He is best known for hitting the series-winning single, a deep fly ball that was not caught by the Braves' drawn-in outfield and scored Dan Gladden from third base during the tenth inning in Game 7 of the 1991 Series.

Larkin was one of seven Twins to be part of both the 1987 and 1991 World Series teams. The other six were Randy Bush, Greg Gagne, Kirby Puckett, Al Newman, Kent Hrbek and Gladden.

Larkin attended Columbia University, where he played for the Lions and was later drafted in the 20th round of the 1984 amateur draft. He was the first alumnus of Columbia University to make the major leagues since Lou Gehrig. He also graduated from Chaminade High School in Mineola, New York. He lives in Eden Prairie, Minnesota, where he coaches youth travel baseball and is the Vice President of Players Only Incorporated, where he does private and group instruction.

In a 758-game major league career, Larkin compiled a .266 batting average (618-for-2321) with 275 runs, 32 home runs and 266 RBI. He recorded a .992 fielding percentage at first base and right and left field. In the postseason, in 1987 and 1991 for the Twins, he hit .273 (3-for-11) with 2 RBI.

Preceded by Carney Lansford	Last hitter of the World Series; 1991	Succeeded by Otis Nixon
