= Dick Such =

American baseball player (born 1944)

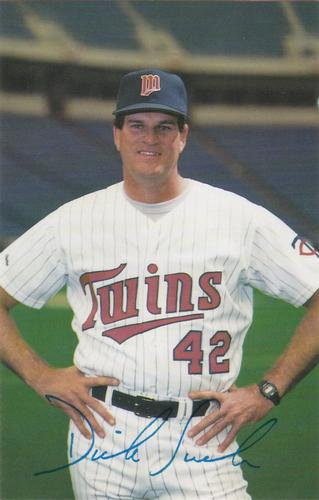
- Such in 1987 as a coach for the Minnesota Twins
- Pitcher
- Born: October 15, 1944 (age 82); Sanford, North Carolina, U.S.
- Batted: Left Threw: Right

MLB debut
- April 6, 1970, for the Washington Senators

Last MLB appearance
- July 17, 1970, for the Washington Senators

MLB statistics
- Win–loss record: 1–5
- Earned run average: 7.56
- Strikeouts: 41
- Stats at Baseball Reference

Teams
- As player: Washington Senators (1970); As coach: Texas Rangers (1983–1985); Minnesota Twins (1986–2001)

Career highlights and awards
- 2× World Series champion (1987, 1991)

Richard Stanley Such (born October 15, 1944) is an American former pitcher and coach in Major League Baseball (MLB). A right-handed hurler who batted left-handed, Such stood 6 feet 4 inches (1.93 m) tall and weighed 190 pounds (86 kg).

== Playing career ==
Born in Sanford, North Carolina, Such attended Elon College and pitched on the baseball team. On June 8, 1965, he was drafted by the New York Yankees in the 40th round of the 1965 Major League Baseball draft, but did not sign. Drafted by the Washington Senators in the 8th round of the 1966 MLB draft (January secondary phase), Such would sign his first professional contract later that spring and would pitch in 14 games for the Burlington Senators in the single-A Carolina League, finishing with a respectable 6-8 record and 3.13 ERA. In his second season in minor league baseball, 1967 with the York White Roses, Washington's Double-A Eastern League affiliate, Such allowed only 108 hits in 128 innings pitched, hurled eight complete games, and compiled an excellent 2.81 earned run average (ERA) — but he also amassed a frustrating 0–16 win–loss record.

Such would return to Burlington in 1968 and, while toiling for another last-place team, Such would lose 17 games while winning only 10. After starting the season with Washington's AAA Denver Bears, he would receive his only major league duty in 1970. Such’s big league career consisted of 21 games (starting five) while compiling a won-lost mark of 1-5 in 50 innings pitched with a 7.56 earned-run average.

Such would be back at Denver in 1971, but would take a step backward (finishing with a 6.12 ERA in 24 games). Such spent the next two years in the Washington/Texas Rangers organization, returning to single-A Burlington in 1972, before calling it a career during the 1973 season after laboring to a 1-1 record and 7.71 ERA in 8 games at AA Pittsfield.

== Coaching career ==
Following his retirement, Such would become a pitching coach and roving pitching instructor in the Ranger's farm system from 1975 through 1982. From 1983 through the midseason of 1985, he was the Rangers' Major League pitching coach, serving on the staff of skipper Doug Rader. Such then moved to the Minnesota Twins, where he would serve as pitching coach under skippers Ray Miller and Tom Kelly for the next 16 years (1986–2001), including the team's World Series victories in 1987 and 1991. Following the retirement of Kelly after the 2001 season, new Twins manager Ron Gardenhire would replace Such with his longtime friend Rick Anderson.

In 2007, after taking off time from baseball, Such was named the pitching coach of the Camden Riversharks of the independent Atlantic League. He would stay with the team through the 2008 season. Such was then the pitching coach of the Salem Red Sox, the Class A-Advanced Carolina League affiliate of the Boston Red Sox, in 2009 and 2010. On December 22, 2010, he was named as pitching coach for the Single-A Greenville Drive, Boston's South Atlantic League farm club; Such served in that role for the 2011 and 2012 seasons. Starting in 2013, he was pitching coach with the rookie league GCL Red Sox. As of January 2020, Such’s role is to provide "seasonal" assistance to the GCL pitching staff.

== Sources ==
- 1982 Texas Rangers Organizational Record Book. St. Petersburg, Florida: Baseball Blue Book, 1982.

Preceded by Jackie Brown	Texas Rangers Pitching Coach; 1983–1985	Succeeded by Tom House
Preceded by Johnny Podres	Minnesota Twins Pitching Coach; 1986–2001	Succeeded by Rick Anderson
