= Steve Lombardozzi =

American baseball player (born 1960)

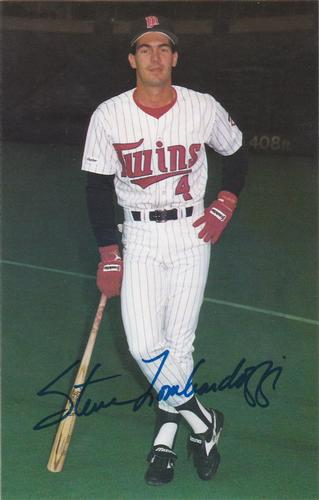
- Lombardozzi in 1987
- Second baseman
- Born: April 26, 1960 (age 66); Malden, Massachusetts, U.S.
- Batted: Right Threw: Right

MLB debut
- July 12, 1985, for the Minnesota Twins

Last MLB appearance
- April 11, 1990, for the Houston Astros

MLB statistics
- Batting average: .233
- Home runs: 20
- Runs batted in: 107
- Stats at Baseball Reference

Teams
- Minnesota Twins (1985–1988); Houston Astros (1989–1990)

Career highlights and awards
- World Series champion (1987)

Stephen Paul Lombardozzi Sr. (/lɒmbɑːrˈdoʊziː/ lom-bar-DOH-zee; born April 26, 1960) is an American former professional baseball player who was a second baseman for the Minnesota Twins and Houston Astros for six Major League Baseball seasons. As part of the Twins' world championship team in 1987, Lombardozzi hit .412 during the World Series and hit a home run in Game 1.

== Early life ==
Lombardozzi was born in Malden, Massachusetts. He received an athletic scholarship to attend the University of Florida in Gainesville, Florida, where he played for coach Jay Bergman's Florida Gators baseball team in 1980 and 1981, after attending Gulf Coast Community College in Panama City, Florida, where he played for Coach Bill Frazier in 1978 and 1979. In 1978, 1979, and 1980, he played collegiate summer baseball with the Falmouth Commodores of the Cape Cod Baseball League and was named a league all-star in 1980. In 1981, he received first team All-Southeastern Conference (SEC) and SEC All-Tournament honors.

== Playing career ==
The Minnesota Twins selected Lombardozzi in the ninth round of the 1981 MLB draft after which he was assigned to the Elizabethton Twins in the rookie-level Appalachian League where he hit .321 with 6 home runs and 38 RBI in 65 games. The following years, he made steady progress through the Twins' organization spending 1982 at class-A Visalia, 1983 at AA Orlando, and 1984 at AAA Toledo. After returning to Toledo in 1985, he made his major league debut with the Twins on July 12 and split the rest of the season between the majors and AAA.

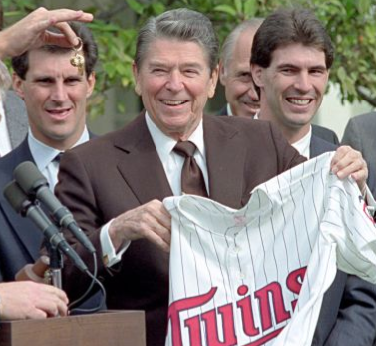
Sal Butera, Ronald Reagan and Lombardozzi (left to right) at the White House in 1987

Lombardozzi went north with the Twins following spring training in 1986 and became the starting second baseman for the team for the next three seasons. In 1987, Lombardozzi was on the team when they won the World Series against the St. Louis Cardinals. He led all hitters in that World Series with a .412 batting average. He also held the record for the longest last name of any player to hit a postseason home run, hitting a Game 1, two-run home run off Cardinal Bob Forsch, until it was broken by Doug Mientkiewicz of the Minnesota Twins in 2002. Lombardozzi also knocked in the winning run in Game 6 as his RBI single broke up a 5th Inning 5–5 tie that eventually lead to an 11-5 Twins' victory.

Despite his World Series heroics and gold glove-caliber fielding (his .991 fielding percentage was tops among American League second basemen in 1986), Lombardozzi was never able to hit above .238 for the Twins (after hitting .275 in the minors and .370 during his 1985 major league debut season) and hit only .209 with 3 home runs and 27 RBI in 1989. Following both the 1987 and 1988 seasons, the Twins, looking to add some more offense at the position, traded first for Cardinal Tommy Herr and then New York Mets second baseman Wally Backman. Being the odd man out, Lombardozzi split time at second in 1988 and finally was traded to the Houston Astros at the end of spring training in 1989 (for career minor league outfielder Roman Cedeno). However, Lombardozzi was never able to either supplant Bill Doran at second or stay with the big club and spent 1989 and 1990 shuttling between Houston and the minors. After playing his last game in Houston on 11 April 1990 he was released by the Astros on May 28. After being signed by the Detroit Tigers on June 9, Lombardozzi was designated to AAA Toledo where he spent the rest of the season. Lobardozzi was then released and he decided to retire at age 30.

== Retirement ==
After his playing days ended, Lombardozzi moved to his home in Columbia, Maryland and focused on his family. He ran a small business, coached youth baseball, and spent time with his two children. After being away from the game for 18 years, Lombardozzi was hired by the Pittsburgh Pirates in December 2009 to be their minor league fielding coordinator, taking the place of Carlos García, who was hired as the Pirates' first base/infield coach.

His son, Steve Lombardozzi Jr., formerly played professionally for the Washington Nationals organization and then the Long Island Ducks of the Atlantic League.

== See also ==
- Florida Gators
- List of Florida Gators baseball players
- List of second-generation Major League Baseball players
