= Frank Viola III =

American professional baseball pitcher (born 1984)

- Pitcher
- Born: June 19, 1984 (age 41); St. Paul, Minnesota
- Bats: Right Throws: Right
- Stats at Baseball Reference

Frank John Viola III (born June 19, 1984) is an American professional baseball pitcher who is retired. He played for the Chicago White Sox Organization twice (2003-2008, 2015) and also played for the Independent League St. Paul Saints (2010), and in the Toronto Blue Jays organization (2014). Viola is the son of major league pitcher and 1988 Cy Young Award winner Frank Viola and the brother of 2008 and 2011 NCAA Champion platform diver and 2012 Olympian, Brittany Viola.

== Career ==
Viola attended Florida College and was drafted by the Chicago White Sox in the 29th round of the 2004 MLB draft. After signing with the White Sox, Viola was assigned to the rookie level Bristol White Sox where he had a 5-2 record with a 3.82 ERA in 13 games (12 starts). After blowing out his elbow in spring training, he missing the entire 2006 season following Tommy John surgery. In 2007, Viola returned to Bristol, but pitched in only 11 games (0-0 record with a 4.96 ERA) before he injured his knee. He was released by the White Sox organization following the season. On June 29, 2010, he returned to baseball after signing with the independent league St. Paul Saints and finished with a 1-2 record and a 4.58 ERA in 21 games before retiring from professional baseball.

After failing tryouts with several major league teams, Viola was hired to be a studio analyst for Bright House Sports Network on their studio show and for their Florida State League broadcasts. He also started his own fishing show and also sold timeshares. Starting in 2012, Frank III worked with Toronto's R. A. Dickey, former Boston Red Sox pitcher Tim Wakefield and Hall of Famer Phil Niekro on developing a knuckleball to resurrect his baseball career. On March 5, 2014, he was signed by the Toronto Blue Jays to a minor league contract, and was assigned to the Lansing Lugnuts, their Class-A affiliate, on June 6.

On June 14, 2014, Viola earned his first affiliated professional baseball win since 2005 when the Lugnuts topped the Great Lakes Loons 3-0. Viola pitched 6 2/3 scoreless innings, allowed eight hits, struck out one and walked two batters on his way to the win. On July 2, he was promoted to the Dunedin Blue Jays. In his debut for Dunedin, Viola pitched 6 innings and surrendered 1 run on 5 hits, with 4 walks. On July 21, Viola was released by the Blue Jays organization. He made 9 starts in 2014 and posted a 3–4 win–loss record, 7.15 earned run average, and a 2.05 WHIP over 39 innings.

In February 2015, he signed a minor league contract with the Chicago White Sox. He retired on March 31.

In 2016, Frank founded a non-profit organization Expiration 2050, which advocates toward sustainable wild fisheries and healthy marine life. His organization works closely with corporations, organizations and locals to find and create educational and creative campaigns toward viable solutions. His website, Exp2050.org went live in March 2017.

Frank now hosts a YouTube fishing series named "Fishing With Frankie", which he hosts, films and produces with his friend, Jim Cichoski.
