= Tom Kelly (baseball) =

American baseball player and manager (born 1950)

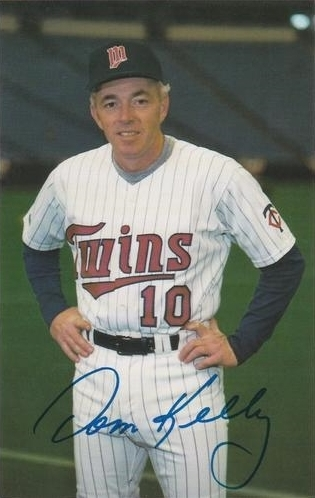
- Kelly in 1987
- First baseman / Manager
- Born: August 15, 1950 (age 76); Graceville, Minnesota, U.S.
- Batted: Left Threw: Left

MLB debut
- May 11, 1975, for the Minnesota Twins

Last MLB appearance
- July 11, 1975, for the Minnesota Twins

MLB statistics
- Batting average: .181
- Home runs: 1
- Runs batted in: 11
- Managerial record: 1,140–1,244
- Winning %: .478
- Stats at Baseball Reference
- Managerial record at Baseball Reference

Teams
- As player: Minnesota Twins (1975); As manager: Minnesota Twins (1986–2001); As coach: Minnesota Twins (1983–1986)

Career highlights and awards
- 2× World Series champion (1987, 1991); AL Manager of the Year (1991); Minnesota Twins No. 10 retired; Minnesota Twins Hall of Fame

Jay Thomas Kelly (born August 15, 1950) is an American former professional baseball player, coach and manager. As the manager of the Minnesota Twins of Major League Baseball (MLB) over 16 seasons from mid-September 1986 through 2001, he won two World Series championships. Currently, he serves as a special assistant to the general manager for the Twins.

Kelly was born in Graceville, Minnesota, and grew up in Sayreville, New Jersey, attending St. Mary's High School in nearby South Amboy.

== Playing career ==
A first baseman and outfielder, Kelly threw and batted left-handed and was listed as 5 feet 11 inches (1.80 m) tall and 188 pounds (85 kg). He was drafted by the Seattle Pilots in the eighth round of the 1968 Major League Baseball draft. After three years in the Pilots/Milwaukee Brewers organization, he was given his unconditional release on April 6, 1971.

On April 28, 1971, Kelly was signed as a minor league free agent by the Twins and sent to the Double-A Charlotte Hornets in the Southern League. From 1972 through 1975, Kelly would spend most of his playing time with the Triple-A Tacoma Twins of the Pacific Coast League, splitting time between first base and the corner outfield positions.

After starting the 1975 season again in Tacoma, Kelly was called up to the parent Twins and made his major league debut on May 11, 1975. Kelly would play in 49 games with the Twins over the 1975 season, getting into 43 games at first base and two in the outfield. In 147 plate appearances, he collected 15 bases on balls and 23 hits, with five doubles and one home run (a solo blast off Vern Ruhle at Tiger Stadium on 26 May), hitting a poor .181 with 11 runs batted in. Prior to the start of the 1976 season, Kelly was purchased by the Baltimore Orioles and assigned to the Triple-A Rochester Red Wings; he would not return to the major leagues as an active player. In 1977, he returned to the Twins organization and Tacoma – spending part of the year as a player-manager. In 1978, Kelly appeared in 119 games for the Twins new Triple-A affiliate, the Toledo Mud Hens. It was his last year as a full-time player.

== Managerial career ==
Following the 1978 season, Kelly was sent down to manage the Twins' Class A affiliate, the Visalia Oaks in the California League, staying there through the 1980 season. He then spent 1981 and 1982 as skipper of the Double-A Orlando Twins, winning the 1981 Southern League championship.

In 1983, Kelly was appointed third-base coach on Minnesota manager Billy Gardner's big-league coaching staff. He retained the post when Ray Miller became skipper, and succeeded Miller as a manager on September 12, 1986. Kelly became the 11th pilot of the Twins since they moved to Minnesota from Washington in 1961. His 15-plus-year-stint as manager is the longest consecutive-season managerial term in the team's history, which began with the founding of the American League in 1901. During his tenure, the Twins won two World Series crowns in the span of five years (1987 and 1991); however, from 1994 to 1997 a long sequence of retirements and injuries (including superstars Kent Hrbek and Kirby Puckett) hurt the team badly, and Kelly spent the remainder of his managerial career rebuilding the Twins.

=== 1987 World Series ===
A year after taking over the reins of the Twins from Miller, Kelly took the team that he had helped build and led it to a World Series championship. Though the '87 Twins were criticized for being the top team in a weak division (amassing only a .525 record in regular season play, which was the worst winning percentage for an eventual World Champion until surpassed by the St. Louis Cardinals in 2006), they beat the Detroit Tigers in five games, losing only Game 3 of the American League Championship Series to a heartbreaking 8th-inning two-run home run.

The World Series was a close contest between the Twins and the National League champion St. Louis Cardinals, each team winning all of its home games. Games 1, 2, 4 and 6 were lopsided contests (10–1 Twins, 8–4 Twins, 7–2 Cards, 11–5 Twins), with Games 3, 5 and 7 being much closer, each being decided by only two runs (3–1 Cards, 4–2 Cards and 4–2 Twins). The Twins ended up winning the second World Championship for the franchise and first since their 1961 relocation to Minneapolis.

=== 1991 World Series ===
After finishing the 1990 season in last place with a 74-88 record, the Twins dominated the AL West in 1991, finishing 8 games ahead of the second-place Chicago White Sox with a 95–67 record. During this season, the Twins set a club record of 15 consecutive wins, propelling them into first place. In the AL Championship, the Twins beat the Toronto Blue Jays in 5 games, winning the right to face the Atlanta Braves in the World Series. Marked by a series of close contests filled with dramatic plays and extra-innings, the 1991 World Series was later ranked by ESPN as the greatest World Series ever.

Following two closely contested victories at home, the Twins traveled to Atlanta where they suffered three straight defeats. Prior to the Series' move to Atlanta, Kelly said that managing without the designated hitter was "right up there with rocket science". Although he was being facetious, the grueling Game 3 proved Kelly prescient as a series of double switches and substitutions emptied the Twins' bench and both teams' bullpens. Kelly was forced to pinch-hit Rick Aguilera in the top of the 12th and was prepared to send outfielder Dan Gladden to the mound if necessary; however, the Braves won in the bottom of the 12th when David Justice narrowly beat a throw to the plate. After a similarly close Game 4 and a 14–5 Braves victory in Game 5, the Twins had to win the final two games at home.

Game 6 featured two climactic plays by Kirby Puckett who, in the top of the 3rd, made a leaping catch against the center field acrylic glass to prevent a Braves' run. The Twins won 4–3 in the bottom of the 11th when Puckett hit a home run off Charlie Leibrandt. Game 7 was scoreless for 9 innings and included a number of decisive and memorable plays. Kelly planned to take Twins starter Jack Morris out after the ninth inning ended. Morris argued repeatedly with Kelly to allow him to stay in the game. Kelly finally gave in. "What the hell," Kelly said. "It's only a ballgame." Morris ended up pitching 10 scoreless innings as the Twins won 1–0 in the bottom of the 10th, giving Minnesota its second World Series victory in five years.

=== Final years ===
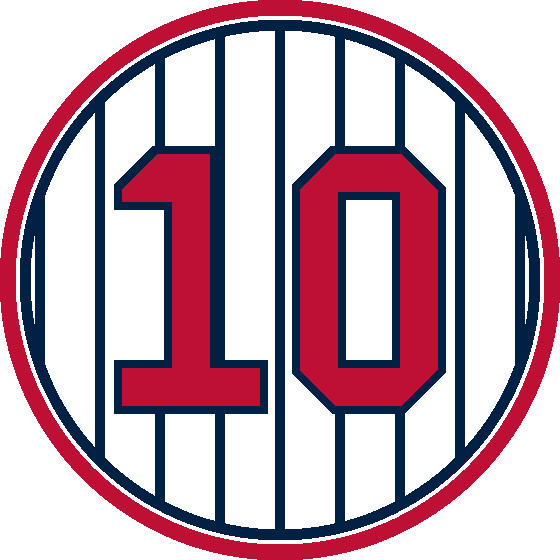
Tom Kelly's number 10 was retired by the Minnesota Twins in 2012.

In 1998, management cleared all players earning over $1 million (except for pitcher Brad Radke) and rebuilt from the ground up; the team went 70–92 and in fourth place in the AL Central, 19 games behind the Cleveland Indians and five games ahead of the Detroit Tigers. On May 7, 2000, he won his 1,000th game as manager (having managed 2,092 games), doing so with a 4-0 victory over the Detroit Tigers at the Metrodome to become the 46th manager of the 1,000 wins club.

A run of eight straight losing seasons ended in 2001, when the Twins led the division for much of the year before fading, finishing at 85–77, second to Cleveland. He then resigned at age 51, citing burnout, and the threat of contraction. Kelly was succeeded as manager of the Twins by Ron Gardenhire, and his rebuilding efforts paid off the year after he retired from the Twins, with a repeat of divisional championships in 2002, 2003, and 2004.

The Twins retired Kelly's jersey number, #10, on September 8, 2012.

A bronze statue of Kelly was unveiled outside Target Field on July 21, 2017.

== Managerial record ==
| Team | Year | Regular season | | | | | Postseason | | | |
| Team | Year | Games | Won | Lost | Win % | Finish | Won | Lost | Win % | Result |
|---|---|---|---|---|---|---|---|---|---|---|
| MIN | 1986 | 23 | 12 | 11 | .522 | 6th in AL West | – | – | – | |
| MIN | 1987 | 162 | 85 | 77 | .525 | 1st in AL West | 8 | 4 | .667 | Won World Series (STL) |
| MIN | 1988 | 162 | 91 | 71 | .562 | 2nd in AL West | – | – | – | |
| MIN | 1989 | 162 | 80 | 82 | .494 | 5th in AL West | – | – | – | |
| MIN | 1990 | 162 | 74 | 88 | .457 | 7th in AL West | – | – | – | |
| MIN | 1991 | 162 | 95 | 67 | .586 | 1st in AL West | 8 | 4 | .667 | Won World Series (ATL) |
| MIN | 1992 | 162 | 90 | 72 | .556 | 2nd in AL West | – | – | – | |
| MIN | 1993 | 162 | 71 | 91 | .438 | 6th in AL West | – | – | – | |
| MIN | 1994 | 113 | 53 | 60 | .469 | 4th in AL Central | – | – | – | |
| MIN | 1995 | 144 | 56 | 88 | .389 | 5th in AL Central | – | – | – | |
| MIN | 1996 | 162 | 78 | 84 | .481 | 4th in AL Central | – | – | – | |
| MIN | 1997 | 162 | 68 | 94 | .420 | 4th in AL Central | – | – | – | |
| MIN | 1998 | 162 | 70 | 92 | .432 | 4th in AL Central | – | – | – | |
| MIN | 1999 | 161 | 63 | 97 | .394 | 5th in AL Central | – | – | – | |
| MIN | 2000 | 162 | 69 | 93 | .426 | 5th in AL Central | – | – | – | |
| MIN | 2001 | 162 | 85 | 73 | .525 | 2nd in AL Central | – | – | – | |
| MIN total | | 2,385 (Note: Kelly also managed in a game on October 3, 1999 that ended in a tie.) | 1,140 | 1,244 | .478 | | 16 | 8 | .667 | |

== See also ==
- List of Major League Baseball managers with most career wins
- List of Knights of Columbus members

== Notes ==
| Preceded by Roy McMillan | Orlando Twins manager 1981–1982 | Succeeded by Phil Roof |
| Preceded by Karl Kuehl | Minnesota Twins third-base coach 1983–1986 | Succeeded by Rick Renick |
