= Allan Anderson (baseball) =

American baseball player (born 1964)

- Pitcher
- Born: January 7, 1964 (age 62); Lancaster, Ohio, U.S.
- Batted: Left Threw: Left

MLB debut
- June 11, 1986, for the Minnesota Twins

Last MLB appearance
- October 6, 1991, for the Minnesota Twins

MLB statistics
- Win–loss record: 49–54
- Earned run average: 4.11
- Strikeouts: 339
- Stats at Baseball Reference

Teams
- Minnesota Twins (1986–1991)

Career highlights and awards
- AL ERA leader (1988)

Allan Lee Anderson (born January 7, 1964) is an American former professional baseball player. He was a pitcher over parts of six seasons (1986–1991) with the Minnesota Twins, where he led the American League in ERA in 1988. For his career, he compiled a 49–54 record in 148 appearances, with a 4.11 ERA and 339 strikeouts. Anderson, though he pitched for the Twins during the team's World Series Championship seasons of 1987 and 1991, did not pitch in either postseason.

Anderson was born and raised in Lancaster, Ohio, and starred as a pitcher for Lancaster High School and for his American Legion Baseball team.

He was drafted by the Twins in the second round of the 1982 MLB amateur draft. He signed a minor league deal with the New York Yankees before the 1992 season.

Anderson is a real estate agent and auctioneer with Better Homes & Gardens Real Estate (Big Hill) in his hometown of Lancaster, where he also runs the AA Sports LLC Indoor Sports Facility. He is married with two children.

== See also ==
- List of Major League Baseball annual ERA leaders
