= Carmen Castillo =

Dominican baseball player (1958–2015)

Carmelo Castillo
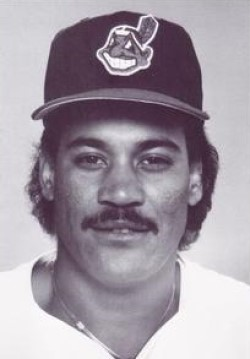
- Outfielder
- Born: June 8, 1958; San Francisco de Macoris, Dominican Republic
- Died: November 15, 2015 (aged 57); Santo Domingo, Dominican Republic
- Batted: Right Threw: Right

MLB debut
- July 17, 1982, for the Cleveland Indians

Last MLB appearance
- May 9, 1991, for the Minnesota Twins

MLB statistics
- Batting average: .252
- Home runs: 55
- Runs batted in: 197
- Stats at Baseball Reference

Teams
- Cleveland Indians (1982–1988); Minnesota Twins (1989–1991)

Monte Carmelo Castillo (June 8, 1958 – November 15, 2015) was a Dominican outfielder in Major League Baseball who played for the Cleveland Indians and Minnesota Twins. Castillo died of heart problems on November 15, 2015.

== Baseball career ==
In 631 games over 10 seasons, Castillo posted a .252 batting average (383-for-1519) with 190 runs, 55 home runs, 197 RBIs and 90 bases on balls. He recorded a .953 fielding percentage as an outfielder.

Signed as a free agent by the Philadelphia Phillies in 1978, Castillo was taken by the Indians on December 5 of that year in the Rule 5 Double-A draft. He had played for two minor teams in the Phillies organization in 1978.

Castillo spent 1979 split between Low-A Batavia and Single-A Waterloo, before spending the entire 1980 season with Waterloo again. In 1981, he was moved up to Double-A Chattanooga, and in 1982, he was promoted to Triple-A Charleston. He would begin 1983 with Charleston before his promotion to the Major Leagues, his debut coming on July 17, 1982 in Cleveland against the California Angels. He would go 0-for-3 with a strikeout while playing left field.

Castillo would spend some time in the 1983 season back at Triple-A Charleston, with multiple promotions to the Indians. He would only play 23 games in the majors that year, but hit a respectable .278 in that time. 1984 would be his first full season, platooning in right field with George Vukovich, and appearing in 87 games overall. Castillo would spend some time at Triple-A Maine in 1985, while also appearing in 67 major league games that year. He would again spend full years in the majors in 1986, 1987 and 1988 with the Indians. In 1986, he would platoon with Cory Snyder and Joe Carter in right field and Andre Thornton at designated hitter. Castillo would play more games than he did previously in a season in 1987, appearing in 89 games and again platooning with Snyder and Pat Tabler at DH. He tied his career high with 11 home runs and set a career high with 220 at-bats and 17 doubles. 1988 would be more of a down year for Castillo, not seeing as much playing time.

On March 26, 1989, just before the start of the season, Castillo was dealt to the Twins for pitcher Keith Atherton. 1989 would be a solid season for him, playing in a career-high 94 games while seeing most of his time in right field in a platoon with Randy Bush. 1990 would see Castillo relegated to more of a bench role, and his 1991 season did not start off well, resulting in him being released by the Twins on May 10.

On May 25, Castillo would sign with the Milwaukee Brewers, and was assigned to Triple-A Denver, where he would spend the rest of the season. The Twins would go on to win the 1991 World Series. Castillo spent the 1992 season in the Mexican Baseball League before retiring.
