= Pedro Muñoz (baseball) =

Puerto Rican baseball player (born 1968)

- Outfielder
- Born: September 19, 1968 (age 56); Ponce, Puerto Rico
- Batted: Right Threw: Right

MLB debut
- September 1, 1990, for the Minnesota Twins

Last MLB appearance
- June 1, 1996, for the Oakland Athletics

MLB statistics
- Batting average: .273
- Home runs: 67
- Runs batted in: 252
- Stats at Baseball Reference

Teams
- Minnesota Twins (1990–1995); Oakland Athletics (1996)

Pedro Javier Muñoz González (born September 19, 1968) is a Puerto Rican former outfielder in Major League Baseball. He played seven seasons in the majors, from 1990 until 1996, for the Minnesota Twins and Oakland Athletics. He hit his first MLB home run off Darren Holmes of the Milwaukee Brewer's on May 16, 1991, and his first grand slam a month later against the New York Yankees.

In 517 games over 7 seasons, Muñoz compiled a .273 batting average (467-for-1708) with 203 runs, 75 doubles, 8 triples, 67 home runs, 252 RBI, 100 bases on balls, 418 strikeouts, .315 on-base percentage and .444 slugging percentage. Defensively, he recorded a .976 fielding percentage.
