= Dan Gladden =

American baseball player (born 1957)

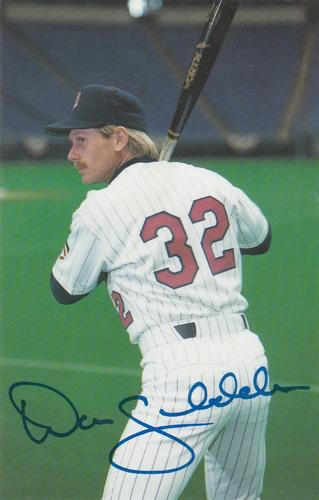
- Gladden in 1987
- Left fielder / Center fielder
- Born: July 7, 1957 (age 69); San Jose, California, U.S.
- Batted: Right Threw: Right

MLB debut
- September 5, 1983, for the San Francisco Giants

Last MLB appearance
- October 3, 1993, for the Detroit Tigers

MLB statistics
- Batting average: .270
- Home runs: 74
- Runs batted in: 446

NPB statistics
- Batting average: .267
- Home runs: 15
- Runs batted in: 37
- Stats at Baseball Reference

Teams
- San Francisco Giants (1983–1986); Minnesota Twins (1987–1991); Detroit Tigers (1992–1993); Yomiuri Giants (1994)

Career highlights and awards
- 2× World Series champion (1987, 1991); Japan Series champion (1994); Minnesota Twins Hall of Fame

Clinton Daniel Gladden III (born July 7, 1957) is an American former professional baseball player and current radio broadcaster. An outfielder, he played in Major League Baseball (MLB) for the San Francisco Giants (1983–1986), Minnesota Twins (1987–1991), and Detroit Tigers (1992–1993) before playing a final season in Japan in 1994 with the Yomiuri Giants of Nippon Professional Baseball (NPB).

Gladden was the starting left fielder on the Twins' two World Series Championship teams in 1987 and 1991. He was one of seven Twins players to be part of both the 1987 and 1991 championship teams, the other six being Randy Bush, Greg Gagne, Kent Hrbek, Gene Larkin, Al Newman, and Kirby Puckett. He also won a Japan Series championship with the Yomiuri Giants during his only season in Japan.

== Baseball career ==
Known as "the Dazzle Man", Gladden attended California State University, Fresno and was signed by the San Francisco Giants as an amateur free agent in 1979. He made his debut with the Giants in 1983, and in 1984 he batted .351 with 31 stolen bases as the Giants' center fielder.

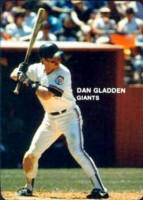
Gladden batting for the Giants in 1985

In 1987, Gladden was traded to the Minnesota Twins and won a World Series championship in his first year with the team. In Game 1 of the Series, he hit the first grand slam in a World Series game in 17 years. He would earn another World Series championship ring with the Twins in 1991, when they defeated the Atlanta Braves in what is sometimes called the greatest World Series ever played. In the intense and memorable Game 7 of the 1991 Series, Gladden stretched a broken bat bloop hit into a double before scoring the winning run on Gene Larkin's single off of Atlanta's Alejandro Peña in the bottom of the 10th inning.

After the 1991 season, Gladden signed as a free agent with the Detroit Tigers, playing with them until 1993. He spent 1994 in Japan playing for the Yomiuri Giants, winning a Japan Series championship. Because of the 1994–95 MLBPA strike, Gladden's championship with the kyojin is regarded by some fans as a world championship, and he retired from the game as a player on top as a three-time world champion with the distinction of having won championships in two continents (as does teammate Hideki Matsui, who won the World Series in 2009 with the New York Yankees). As of 2025, Gladden remains the last foreign position player to win both the World Series and Japan Series; since then he has been joined by pitcher Chris Martin, who was on the Japan Series champion Nippon Ham Fighters in 2016 and the World Series champion Atlanta Braves in 2021. (The most recent player to achieve this double is Shohei Ohtani, who was a teammate of Martin's on the 2016 Fighters and was on the 2024 and 2025 World Series winning Los Angeles Dodgers teams.)

Gladden is also remembered in Japan for a brawl that occurred in Meiji Jingu Stadium on May 11, 1994, after Tokyo Yakult Swallows pitcher Tatsuji Nishimura threw a pitch on the head to catcher Shinichi Murata, causing him to fall into a concussion. Later in the game, Giants pitcher Masao Kida hit Nishimura with a pitch, who later threw a pitch up and inside on Gladden, who then punched Swallows catcher Chikasi Nakanishi, causing the benches to clear. Nakanishi, Nishimura, and Gladden were all ejected from the game following the incident, and NPB instituted a rule change where pitchers were automatically ejected if a hit by pitch hits the opposing batter in the head.

He returned to the Twins as a scout (spring training, 1995), then the Colorado Rockies (advance, 1996–1998) and spent 1999 as a roving instructor for the San Francisco Giants.

In an 11-year major league career covering 1,196 games, Gladden hit .270 (1215-for-4501) with 663 runs, 74 home runs, 446 RBI, and 222 stolen bases. In the 1987 and 1991 post-season with the Minnesota Twins, in 24 games he batted .279 (29-for-104), scoring 17 runs, with one home run, 15 RBI and 7 stolen bases.

== Broadcasting career ==
In 2000, Gladden became the color commentator on the Twins' radio network broadcast, most notably on WCCO-AM through 2006 and on the Twins Radio Network and its Metro Affiliate KSTP starting in 2007. He worked alongside Frick award-winning commentator Herb Carneal and the Twins' play-by-play man, John Gordon; Carneal died on April 1, 2007, leaving Gladden to deliver color commentary full-time.

== Personal life ==
Gladden attended Monta Vista High School in Cupertino, California until his parents divorced, at which point he transferred to Westmont High in Campbell, from which he later graduated.

Gladden met his wife, Janice Murphy, while they were both attending De Anza College and they were married on July 7, 1979. Janice's father played Negro league baseball. They had two daughters together, one of whom married and had a child with Gary Gaetti's son. Gladden settled with his wife in Eden Prairie, Minnesota.

== See also ==
- List of Major League Baseball career stolen bases leaders
