= Randy Bush =

American baseball player (born 1958)

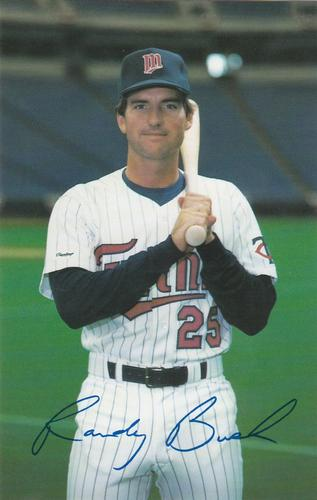
- Bush in 1987
- Outfielder / Designated hitter
- Born: October 5, 1958 (age 67); Dover, Delaware, U.S.
- Batted: Left Threw: Left

MLB debut
- May 1, 1982, for the Minnesota Twins

Last MLB appearance
- June 23, 1993, for the Minnesota Twins

MLB statistics
- Batting average: .251
- Home runs: 96
- Runs batted in: 409
- Stats at Baseball Reference

Teams
- Minnesota Twins (1982–1993)

Career highlights and awards
- 2× World Series champion (1987, 1991)

This is the baseball player. For the computer scientist see Randy Bush (scientist)

Robert Randall Bush (born October 5, 1958) is an American former Major League Baseball player and current front office member of the Chicago Cubs. He played 12 seasons for the Minnesota Twins from 1982 to 1993, mainly as an outfielder and designated hitter, compiling 96 home runs, 409 RBIs, and a career batting average of .251 in 1,219 games with Minnesota.

== Amateur career ==
A native of Dover, Delaware, Bush played baseball at the University of New Orleans. In 1979, he played collegiate summer baseball with the Wareham Gatemen of the Cape Cod Baseball League.

== Professional career ==
Bush was selected in the second round of the 1979 Major League Baseball draft by the Minnesota Twins and spent the next three seasons in the minor leagues before making his major league debut in 1982. Although used primarily as the Twins' designated hitter his first three seasons, Bush saw most of his action in right and left field, but also saw time at first base and even one game in center field. However it was likely that his chief role with the Twins was as a pinch hitter, as he twice had 13 pinch hits in a season - leading the American League in that category in 1991 and finishing third in 1986 and 1992. In 1991, Bush tied an American League record with a pinch-hit in seven consecutive games. After resigning him in 1988, 1990, and 1993 as a free agent, Bush was given his unconditional release from the Twins on June 27, 1993.

Bush was one of seven Twins to be part of both the 1987 and 1991 World Series teams. The other six were Dan Gladden, Greg Gagne, Kirby Puckett, Al Newman, Gene Larkin, and Kent Hrbek.

In his career, Bush was mostly utilized as a platoon player, almost never facing left handed pitchers. Manager Tom Kelly, who managed Bush for the bulk of his career, went to great lengths to only use against right handers. In a career in which Bush started 787 games, only 3 of them were verse left handed pitchers.

== Post-playing career ==
Bush was head coach of the University of New Orleans baseball team from 2000 through 2005. In January 2005, he was named the special assistant to the general manager of the Chicago Cubs, during which time he served as an advance scout for the team charting other major league teams and players as well as the Cubs' own minor league system. In December 2006, he was promoted to the position of assistant general manager of the Cubs. On August 19, 2011, Bush was named the interim general manager of the Chicago Cubs replacing Jim Hendry. Bush was retained by new president of baseball operations Theo Epstein when he was hired, and continued in an assistant GM role. On October 4, 2012, it was announced that Cubs will have two assistant general managers with the promotion of Shiraz Rehman, with Bush continuing to in the same role. On October 20, 2021, it was announced that Bush would be transitioning out of the front office and take a new role as a senior advisor for baseball operations.

== See also ==
- List of Major League Baseball players who spent their entire career with one franchise
