= Kent Hrbek =

American baseball player (born 1960)

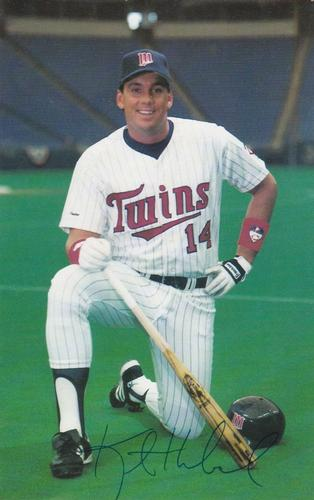
- Hrbek in 1987
- First baseman
- Born: May 21, 1960 (age 66); Minneapolis, Minnesota, U.S.
- Batted: Left Threw: Right

MLB debut
- August 24, 1981, for the Minnesota Twins

Last MLB appearance
- August 10, 1994, for the Minnesota Twins

MLB statistics
- Batting average: .282
- Home runs: 293
- Runs batted in: 1,086
- Stats at Baseball Reference

Teams
- Minnesota Twins (1981–1994)

Career highlights and awards
- All-Star (1982); 2× World Series champion (1987, 1991); Minnesota Twins No. 14 retired; Minnesota Twins Hall of Fame

Kent Alan Hrbek (/ˈhɜːrbɛk/ HUR-bek; born May 21, 1960), nicknamed "Herbie", is an American former Major League Baseball first baseman. He played his entire 14-year baseball career with the Minnesota Twins (1981–1994). Hrbek batted left-handed and threw right-handed. He hit the first home run in the Hubert H. Humphrey Metrodome on April 3, 1982, in an exhibition game against the Phillies. Fans knew Hrbek as an outstanding defensive player, perennial slugger, and charismatic hometown favorite. Former Twins pitcher Jim Kaat considered Hrbek to be the best defensive first baseman he had ever seen, despite him never winning a Gold Glove at the position.

== Early life ==
Hrbek was born in Minneapolis on May 21, 1960. He attended Kennedy High School in Bloomington, Minnesota.

== Career ==
Kent Hrbek was drafted by his hometown Minnesota Twins in the 17th round of the 1978 Major League Baseball draft and spent the next three seasons working his way up the Twins' organizational ladder where he would hit 47 home runs and rack up 111 runs batted in while hitting .318 in 253 minor league games. In 1979, Hrbek played 24 games for the rookie league Elizabethton Twins in the Appalachian Rookie League before spending the next two seasons playing A ball—first for the Wisconsin Rapids Twins in the Midwest League and then the Visalia Oaks in the California League. Hrbek made his major league debut on August 24, 1981, at Yankee Stadium, hitting a game-winning home run in the 12th inning off New York reliever and future Twins player George Frazier.

After his "cup of coffee" at the end of the 1981 season, Hrbek would make the team out of spring training and come into his own in 1982, playing well for Twins manager Billy Gardner. Finishing his rookie season hitting .301 with 23 home runs and 92 RBI, Hrbek would finish second in the Rookie of the Year voting (to future Hall of Famer Cal Ripken Jr.) and be selected to his only All-Star game. Although the Twins would finish 60–102, Hrbek and fellow rookies Tim Laudner, Gary Gaetti, Tom Brunansky, Randy Bush, and Frank Viola would make up the nucleus of the 1987 World Series team. Falling off slightly in his sophomore year (.297, 16 HR, 84 RBI), Hrbek would come up big in 1984, finishing the season hitting .311 (his second-highest career batting average) with 27 HR (his 3rd highest total), 107 RBI (his highest career total), 174 hits (his highest total), and 80 runs (his third highest total). During, arguably, his career year, Hrbek would power the Twins all season and the team would surprise the rest of the American League West by battling for the division crown. Although the team was as close as 0.5 games out of first place at 81–75, the Twins faded fast, lost their last 6 games, and finished in a tie with the California Angels, three games behind the Kansas City Royals. After the season, Hrbek was recognized for his performance and the team's surprise September run, by his finishing second in the American League Most Valuable Player balloting to Detroit Tigers' closer Willie Hernández.

=== World Series play ===
Some of his most memorable moments were during the 1987 season. He hit a career-best 34 home runs to help the Twins win the AL West.

Hrbek was instrumental in capturing the World Series Championship, although he hit only .208, as he slugged a grand slam in Game 6 off Cardinals reliever Ken Dayley, which essentially sealed the win for his Twins.

In 1991, he again helped the Twins win the World Series after having a typical Hrbek season (.284, 20 home runs, and 89 RBI). The Twins had finished the previous season in last place, as had their Series opponent the Atlanta Braves, which prompted the media to coin the phrase "Worst to First World Series." Hrbek's offense turned stale after his home run in Game 1 and he hit only .115 for the series with the one home run and 2 RBI. However, in Game 7, with the score still tied 0–0 in the 8th inning, Hrbek executed a very uncommon 3–2–3 bases-loaded double play with catcher Brian Harper which saved the Twins against the Braves' biggest threat of the game. The Twins eventually won the game 1–0, with Gene Larkin hitting a bases-loaded single to center field that scored Dan Gladden in the bottom of the 10th inning.

Hrbek was involved in a controversial play with Ron Gant in Game 2 of the 1991 Series. While Gant was coming back to first base after widely rounding the base on a single, Hrbek lifted Gant off the bag while applying the tag. Umpire Drew Coble called Gant out. Gant angrily disputed the call and had to be restrained when Coble refused to change it. The move was later nicknamed the "T-Rex Tag," because of Hrbek's long-standing, but joking nickname, in which he jokingly speculated about a post-baseball career in professional wrestling using the name Tyrannosaurus Rex. When the Series moved to Atlanta, Braves fans jeered him, and Hrbek received much hate mail, including a death threat.

Although he was a key part of both World Series teams, Hrbek was largely ineffective at the plate, hitting just .154 in 24 post-season games with only 3 home runs and 12 RBI. Hrbek was one of seven Twins to be part of both the 1987 and 1991 World Series teams. The other six were Randy Bush, Greg Gagne, Kirby Puckett, Al Newman, Gene Larkin (who made the winning hit in Game 7 of the 1991 series), and Dan Gladden (who was the runner Larkin scored with that hit).

=== Media ===
Hrbek served as an unofficial consultant for the baseball movie Little Big League (1994). The character of Lou Collins was loosely based on him and actor Timothy Busfield (himself a former minor league player) became friends during filming.

== Retirement ==
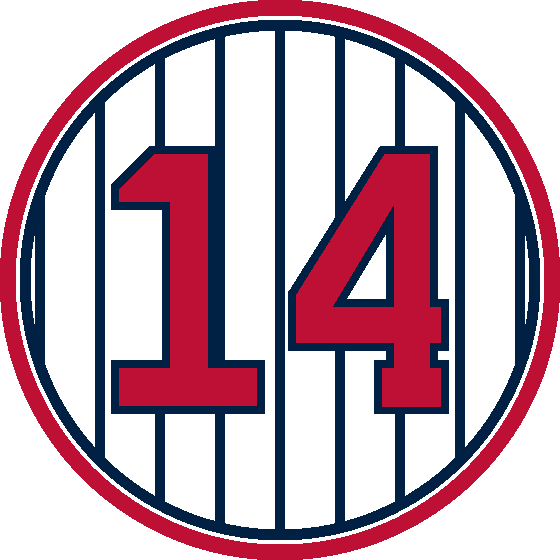
Kent Hrbek's number 14 was retired by the Minnesota Twins in 1995.

Frequently injured (though seldom seriously), Hrbek retired after the players strike in 1994, citing his nagging injury problems and desire to spend more time with his wife and daughter at their home in Bloomington, Minnesota. Hrbek, who was notorious for losing his stirrups, was the most outspoken member of the MLBPA to revise the uniform code to remove mandatory stirrups and helped to ensure it was written into the new labor agreement following the 1994 player strike. "I'm thankful that future generations of players will not have to rummage through their lockers 20 minutes before the first pitch to find those darn stirrups. If that's my lone contribution to the game, I've done enough." Despite operating in the same lineup as Kirby Puckett for all but two years of his career—and his long and close association with Puckett—Hrbek's numbers never approached those of the center fielder. In 2000, his first year of Hall of Fame eligibility, Hrbek garnered only 5 votes, which was nowhere near the 5% minimum threshold for continued eligibility. Thus, he is ineligible for the Hall of Fame unless voted in by the Veterans Committee. His first year of Veterans' Committee eligibility was 2015.

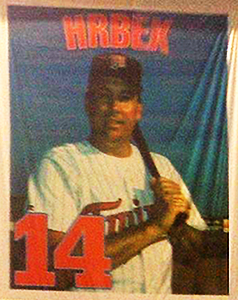
Hrbek's number 14 retirement banner from the Hubert H. Humphrey Metrodome

Kent Hrbek's number 14 was retired by the Twins in 1995, which at the time, made him just the fourth Twins player in franchise history to have his number retired. (The other three were Harmon Killebrew, Rod Carew, and Tony Oliva.) Hrbek was also inducted into the Minnesota Sports Hall of Fame in 1996. He was also one of few players at the time—and even rarer by today's standards—to have played out his entire career with only one team. He never expressed any desire to play for any other team and took less money than he could have made elsewhere to remain with the Twins for his final contract which covered the 1990–1994 seasons.

In 2000, the Twins established their own "Minnesota Twins Hall of Fame," and Hrbek was one of six former Twins inducted into the initial class. The 2000 class also included MLB Hall of Famers Rod Carew, Harmon Killebrew, Kirby Puckett, and Tony Oliva, along with former owner Calvin Griffith.

=== Other affiliations ===
Hrbek is an avid hunter and fisherman, particularly in his home state of Minnesota. He hosted an outdoor sports program on KMSP-TV called Kent Hrbek Outdoors from 2004 to 2010. Hrbek is a perennial pitchman for Twin Cities-area HVAC companies offering Carrier Heating and Air Conditioning equipment. He has a series of baseball fields named after him in his hometown of Bloomington.

Since Kent Hrbek's father died of amyotrophic lateral sclerosis (ALS, or "Lou Gehrig's disease") in 1982, he has worked to increase awareness of the disease. Hrbek hosts an annual charity golf tournament in Minnesota to raise money for ALS research and makes many public appearances on behalf of the cause. He also participates in an annual fundraising event called the "Black Woods Blizzard Tour," a snowmobile excursion around northern Minnesota which raises money to fight the deadly disease. As of 2019, Hrbek and his then-wife, Jeanie Hrbek, were honorary co-chairs of the ALS Association's MN/ND/SD Chapter. He was awarded the Lou Gehrig Memorial Award in 1991 for his efforts.

== Personal life ==
Hrbek has a daughter, Heidi, from his marriage to Jeanie. Jeanie and Kent divorced in 2018. Kent married Kristen Thoen in October, 2024.

== Career statistics ==
AVG	G	AB	R	H	2B	3B	HR	RBI	BB	K	OBP	SLG	HBP	GD	TB	IB	SH	SF	SB	CS	SB%	AB/HR	AB/K	FLD%
.282	1747	6192	903	1749	312	18	293	1086	838	798	.367	.481	26	165	2976	110	15	66	37	26	.587	21.1	7.8	.994

== See also ==
- List of Major League Baseball career home run leaders
- List of Major League Baseball career runs batted in leaders
- List of Major League Baseball players who spent their entire career with one franchise
