= Al Newman =

American baseball player (born 1960)

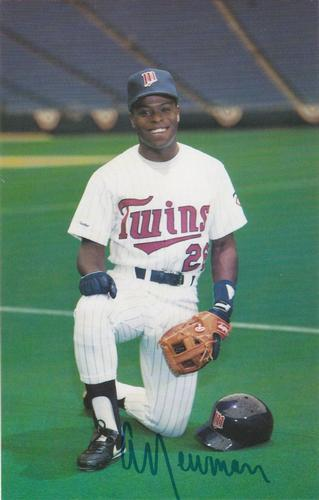
- Newman in 1987
- Infielder
- Born: June 30, 1960 (age 66); Kansas City, Missouri, U.S.
- Batted: Switch Threw: Right

MLB debut
- June 14, 1985, for the Montreal Expos

Last MLB appearance
- October 3, 1992, for the Texas Rangers

MLB statistics
- Batting average: .226
- Home runs: 1
- Runs batted in: 156
- Stats at Baseball Reference

Teams
- Montreal Expos (1985–1986); Minnesota Twins (1987–1991); Texas Rangers (1992)

Career highlights and awards
- 2× World Series champion (1987, 1991)

Albert Dwayne Newman (born June 30, 1960) is an American former professional baseball infielder. He played in Major League Baseball (MLB) for the Montreal Expos (1985–1986), Minnesota Twins (1987–1991) and Texas Rangers (1992). Newman was a switch-hitter and threw right-handed.

== San Diego State (1979–1982) ==
Newman attended San Diego State University where he played for the renowned coach Jim Dietz, majored in Accounting and also played football as a running back. In 1980, 1981, and 1982, he played in the National Baseball Congress Tournament in Wichita, KS. Newman left college with two All-Conference seasons.

Drafted in the third round of the 1979 Major League Baseball draft by the California Angels, Newman turned down their offer and returned to college. In 1980, Newman was again drafted in the third round and declined contract offers, this time by the Texas Rangers. In the June secondary phase of the 1980 draft, he was selected in the second round by the New York Mets and did not sign. On June 8, 1981, Newman was drafted in the first round (12th overall) by the Montreal Expos, with whom he would sign his first Major League Baseball contract.

== Minor Leagues (1980–1985) ==
Newman spent much of the next four years in the minor leagues. Newman debuted in organized baseball with the Memphis Chicks, Montreal's AA-level team, and was a South Atlantic League All-Star second baseman during the 1982 season. In 1983, Newman started the season again at Memphis before being promoted to Montreal's AAA-level team, the Wichita Aeros. On December 7, 1983, Newman was included in a large, three-team trade that saw the Expos send him to the San Diego Padres and starting pitcher Scott Sanderson to the Chicago Cubs. To round out the trade, the Padres sent Gary Lucas to the Expos while the Cubs sent Carmelo Martinez, Craig Lefferts, and Fritzie Connally to the Padres.

Newman started the 1984 season back at the AA level, playing for the Beaumont Golden Gators in the Texas League, before being traded back to the Expos on July 20, 1984, for starting pitcher Greg Harris. Newman spent the rest of the 1984 season and much of 1985 season with the Expos' new AAA team, the Indianapolis Indians.

== Major Leagues (1985–1992) ==
Primarily a second baseman, Newman also played shortstop, third base and left field at some point in his career. He made his major league debut on 14 June 1985 when he was brought in as a pinch runner and scored a run. Newman was used sparingly by the Expos, playing in 32 games in 1985 and 95 games in 1986. On July 6, 1986, Newman hit his only Major League home run (off Atlanta's Zane Smith), the same game in which the Braves' Bob Horner hit four home runs. Newman ended his career with a 4.000 slugging percentage against Smith as this home run was hit in his only at bat versus the pitcher.

Prior to the beginning of the 1987 season, Newman was traded to the Minnesota Twins for career minor league pitcher Mike Shade. Upon first arriving in Minnesota and seeing Kirby Puckett take batting practice, Newman was quoted as saying, "He's the eighth wonder of the world!" Newman saw much more playing time with the Twins, proving to be a valuable utility player and pinch runner, but had trouble hitting for average in 1987, including a 0–31 hitless streak. Newman was a member of two World Series teams in 1987 and 1991 and had two hits, including a triple, and one walk and one RBI in eight World Series plate appearances. His most productive season came in 1989 with the Twins, when he posted career-highs in stolen bases (25), hits (113), doubles (18), runs batted in (38), runs (62) and batting average (.253).

During the 1989 season, Newman was interviewed along with teammate Gary Gaetti about playing the "hot corner" (third base) for the Minnesota Twins. Newman recounted an experience playing the position when future Hall of Famer (and future Twin) Dave Winfield came to the plate, "Dave Winfield hit one right at me last year. I had no chance to move. I looked and the ball was in my glove. I made like I knew what I was doing." In 1990, Al Newman was a part of setting a major league record as the Twins turned two triple plays in one game against the Boston Red Sox, making the final throw in both. Also during the 1990 season, teammate and future Hall of Famer, Kirby Puckett, was moved around the field from his normal centerfield position to play right field, third base, shortstop, and second base in a single game. Newman jokingly remarked to the press following the game, "I'm glad Puck's one of us utility guys now. Maybe he'll raise the salary structure a little."

Only weeks after the 1991 World Series victory, Newman was granted free agency by the Twins and was not re-signed. After weighing his options, Newman signed with the Cincinnati Reds on February 2, 1992, but was released on April 1 during the final roster cutdowns. However, Newman was signed just two days later by the Texas Rangers in what would turn out to be his final major league season. In 246 at-bats in 1992, Newman amassed 54 hits, 25 runs, 9 stolen bases, and 34 walks.

In an eight-season career, Newman was a .226 hitter with one home run and 156 RBI in 854 games. As his career hitting statistics would indicate, Newman did not exactly excel at the plate and displayed little power. Newman finished with the third-most career at-bats of any player with only one home run since World War II.

In 1992, to commemorate the Twins' World Series victory of the previous year, the team issued a set of playing cards on which Newman was featured on the "3 of Clubs".

== Coach, manager, and scout (1992–2006) ==
Following his playing career, Newman managed the Twins AA team, the New Britain Rock Cats of the Eastern League for the 1996 and 1997 seasons. In 1996, his team finished last at 61–81, but showed improvement in 1997, posting a 70–72 record and finishing third to last. In the 1997 Arizona Fall League, Newman managed the Sun City Solar Sox finishing second in their division with a 22–23 record. in 1998, he was the bench coach for the Twins' AAA affiliate, the Salt Lake Buzz. From 1999 to 2001, Newman was the manager of the Twins' rookie league Gulf Coast League Twins. After a 33–32 record in 2000, Newman added former 1991 World Series teammate Jarvis Brown to his coaching staff.

In 2002, following Twins manager Tom Kelly's retirement, Newman accepted the job of third base coach (formerly occupied by Ron Gardenhire, who was named the new manager). Newman would be the Twins third base coach from 2002 to 2005 and even celebrated in a Twins hype commercial. In April 2003, Kirby Puckett had fallen out of favor with the public after a Sports Illustrated article chronicled a personal life much different from his public persona. Newman sympathized with his long-time friend, saying, "I'm scared to death for him. I'm scared because of his health and about his frame of mind. He's a baseball man and the game that gave him everything -- the game that got him out of the Chicago ghetto -- is gone from him now. The people who loved him don't love him anymore. He's on an island by himself and he's trying to figure out how to get home." During the 2003 season, Newman said of pitcher Jamie Moyer "He's like a fine wine, he gets better with age. No, actually, he just gets slower."

On September 10, 2003, during warm-ups in Chicago during a tight pennant race, Newman took a turn in the batter's box during warm-ups to take some fun hits. Shortly after completion, Newman collapsed on the field and was immediately rushed to the hospital. After several tests, it was determined he had had a brain hemorrhage. His wife Deborah and Twins general manager Terry Ryan remained at the hospital with him throughout the stay where he remained unconscious until September 26. During that time, Gardenhire struggled to keep his team focused while all dealt with their feelings for Newman. Minnesota Twins center fielder Torii Hunter said of Newman, "For me, I think it hurt me more than anybody to see him go down like that, because this is the guy who pretty much taught me the game, and how to play the game hard." While Newman was away from the team, his jersey, number 62, was hung in the dugout for each game as a salute. On October 4, 2003, after being released from the hospital, Newman threw out the first pitch prior to Game 3 of the Twins American League Divisional Series versus the New York Yankees. Gardenhire waved Newman's jersey to fans and was visibly emotional to have him back on the field with him after his long hospital stay.

By March 4, 2004, Newman had returned to the Twins including being on the field a Grapefruit League pre-season game versus the Cincinnati Reds. During Newman's first weeks in return to the Twins, he experienced issues with high blood pressure and was prescribed medication and relaxation.

In 2006, Newman left the Twins and became an advance scout with the Arizona Diamondbacks. On March 12, 2006, Newman, along with former Twins players Kent Hrbek, Torii Hunter, Dave Winfield, and Harmon Killebrew, former manager Tom Kelly, former general manager Andy MacPhail, and longtime Oriole Cal Ripken Jr., spoke at Kirby Puckett's funeral. Newman and Puckett played together throughout Newman's career with the Twins and were good friends and known as pranksters around the clubhouse.

== After baseball ==
On January 22, 2008, Newman announced the creation of "Newmie Rewards LLC", a business created to aid in fund raising for athletic teams.

On July 27, 2008, Newman began broadcasting "The Al Newman Show" on radio WWTC AM1280 "The Patriot" in Minneapolis, MN. The short-lived program was a weekly family-friendly show about sports.

Al Newman has long been involved in the youth baseball player development. As noted above, throughout his coaching career, and also by holding off-season clinics for youth sports.

In 2010, Newman participated in the opening ceremonies for the Target Field, the new home of the Twins, alongside many other former Twins such as Jim Kaat, Bert Blyleven, and Jack Morris. In the same year, Al Newman was the head coach for the Apple Valley, Minnesota High School baseball team.

Newman served as a field manager for the Saint Cloud Rox in the Northwoods League and is an instructor at Acceleration Baseball in Saint Cloud. He left the Rox after the 2018 season.

During his Major League Baseball Hall of Fame induction speech on July 24, 2022, David Ortiz specifically noted Al Newman and John Russell as coaches who worked with him daily to build his confidence to become the player he became.

Preceded by Ron Gardenhire	Minnesota Twins Third Base Coach; 2002-2005	Succeeded by Scott Ullger
