= Doug Baker (baseball) =

American baseball player (born 1961)

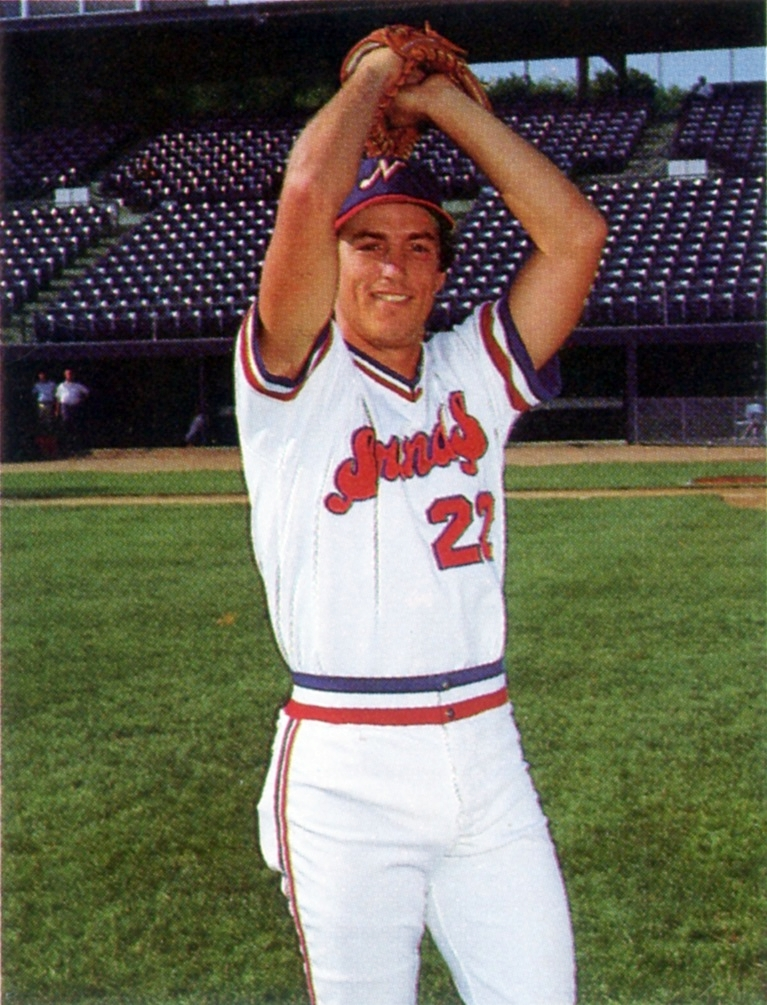
- Baker with the Nashville Sounds in 1985
- Infielder
- Born: April 3, 1961 (age 65); Fullerton, California, U.S.
- Batted: Both Threw: Right

MLB debut
- July 2, 1984, for the Detroit Tigers

Last MLB appearance
- April 12, 1990, for the Minnesota Twins

MLB statistics
- Batting average: .207
- Home runs: 0
- Runs batted in: 22
- Stats at Baseball Reference

Teams
- Detroit Tigers (1984–1987); Minnesota Twins (1988–1990)

Career highlights and awards
- World Series champion (1984)

Douglas Lee Baker (born April 3, 1961) is an American former infielder in Major League Baseball (MLB) player who played with the Detroit Tigers from 1984–1987 and the Minnesota Twins from 1988–1990. Baker played in 136 Major League games and had a .207 batting average with 51 hits, 38 runs, 22 runs batted in, and 11 doubles.

Baker was the younger brother of Dave Baker who also played in the Major Leagues. In high school, Doug Baker played for Granada Hills and one of his teammates was future Denver Broncos quarterback John Elway.

== Pro career ==
Baker was first selected by the Oakland Athletics in the ninth round of the 1981 MLB draft. He did not sign with Oakland, then later transferred from Los Angeles Valley Community college to Arizona State. In the June Draft of 1982, Baker was selected again, this time in the ninth round by the Detroit Tigers. Baker signed with the Tigers and was assigned to their minor league team in the Southern League, the Birmingham Barons. Playing third base for Birmingham that season, Baker played in 70 games, batted .225 and drove in 21 runs. The next season was Baker's first full season in pro baseball. The Tigers made a change, relieving Ed Brinkman of his duties and named Roy Majtyka as manager. Majtyka moved Baker from third to short and Baker played in 120 games and lifted his batting average to .241.

On July 2, 1984, Baker made his MLB debut, going hitless in three at bats against the Chicago White Sox. Baker spent most of the season as a back-up, playing third and second base as well as shortstop. Doug even got a taste of post season baseball in the big leagues, as he appeared in one game during the American league Championship, as a defensive replacement for Alan Trammell in Detroit's 8-1 win over the Kansas City Royals. It would be his only post season appearance as he did not play in the World Series.

Over the course of the next few seasons, with Trammell and Lou Whitaker entrenched at Shortstop and Second base respectively, Baker bounced around from Triple-A to the majors. In February 1988, Baker was traded to the Minnesota Twins for journeyman minor leaguer Julius McDougal. Baker would appear in just three games for the Twins that season. After the season was over, he signed a contract with the Houston Astros but spent the entire season in the minors. At the age of thirty, and not thrilled about the prospect playing another season in the minors, Baker retired from baseball.

Not long after he won a ring with the 1984 Tigers, Baker's World Series ring was stolen after which a replacement was made. The original ring was eventually located and returned to Baker who would later auction off the original, which sold on eBay for $12,000. However, that would not be the only ring Baker would earn in his baseball career as he also received two more as a scout with the Chicago White Sox and Miami Marlins.
