= Tim Laudner =

American baseball player (born 1958)

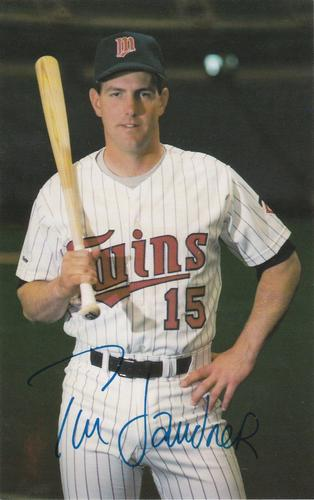
- Laudner in 1987
- Catcher
- Born: June 7, 1958 (age 68); Mason City, Iowa, U.S.
- Batted: Right Threw: Right

MLB debut
- August 28, 1981, for the Minnesota Twins

Last MLB appearance
- September 3, 1989, for the Minnesota Twins

MLB statistics
- Batting average: .225
- Home runs: 77
- Runs batted in: 263
- Stats at Baseball Reference

Teams
- Minnesota Twins (1981–1989)

Career highlights and awards
- All-Star (1988); World Series champion (1987)

Timothy Jon Laudner (born June 7, 1958) is an American former professional baseball catcher, who played in Major League Baseball (MLB) for the Minnesota Twins from 1981 to 1989.

== Playing career ==
After playing baseball for Park Center Senior High School in Brooklyn Park, Minnesota, Laudner was drafted in 1976 by the Cincinnati Reds in the 33rd round, but did not sign. After four years at the University of Missouri, he was drafted by the Twins in the 3rd round of the 1979 draft. Assigned directly to the AA Orlando Twins, Laudner held his own in his first season in the Minnesota organization, hitting .241 in 45 games. The following year, he split his time between Orlando and Single-A Visalia and despite a .227 batting average he hit 12 home runs. Back at Orlando in 1981, he hit 40 home runs while hitting .284 and earning league MVP honors and an August call-up with the Twins where he hit 2 more home runs in 14 games. Despite spending 20 games in 1982 at AAA Toledo, Laudner was called up to the Twins permanently.

Laudner was never able to reproduce his 1981 season in the big leagues. He continued to hit for power, hitting more than ten home runs per season four times over his eight full seasons while averaging only 255 at bats.

Laudner was an instrumental piece of the Twins' 1987 World Series success, hitting a home run and driving in two more runs with another hit in the team's Game 2 victory. This after being something of a secret weapon during the season, in which he batted only .191 with only 55 hits, but 16 of them were home runs. In 1988, he had an exceptional year in almost all statistical categories including games played and at bats. Laudner was also named to the American League All-Star team in 1988, his only appearance. In 1989, he finished his last season in the majors as a backup to Brian Harper, filling a utility role and getting at bats playing first base, catcher and DH. After failing to make the team in 1990, Laudner was assigned to the AAA Portland Beavers, but after 9 games in which he would go hitless over 29 at bats, he decided to retire.

in 734 games over nine seasons, Laudner posted a .225 batting average (458-for-2038) with 221 runs, 77 home runs, 263 RBI and 190 bases on balls. Defensively, he recorded a .985 fielding percentage. In the 1987 postseason covering 12 games, he hit .222 (8-for-36) with 5 runs, 2 doubles, 1 home run, 6 RBI and 7 walks.

== Post-playing career ==
Following his playing career, Laudner worked as a project manager for Kleve Heating and Air Conditioning in Eden Prairie, Minnesota, and as a division manager at Plymouth Plumbing and Heating in Plymouth, Minnesota.

Laudner is currently the co-owner, co-director, and coach of the "Big League Baseball Camp" in Minnesota.

Since 2008, Laudner is a baseball analyst at Fox Sports North and Fox Sports Wisconsin. His duties include providing color commentary for occasional Twins broadcasts.
