= Frank Viola =

American baseball player (born 1960)

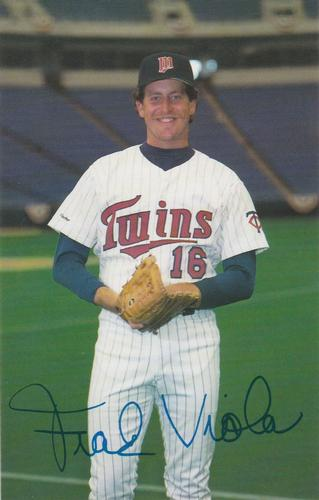
- Viola with the Minnesota Twins in 1987

High Point Rockers
- Pitcher / Coach
- Born: April 19, 1960 (age 66); East Meadow, New York, U.S.
- Batted: Left Threw: Left

MLB debut
- June 6, 1982, for the Minnesota Twins

Last MLB appearance
- May 28, 1996, for the Toronto Blue Jays

MLB statistics
- Win–loss record: 176–150
- Earned run average: 3.73
- Strikeouts: 1,844
- Stats at Baseball Reference

Teams
- Minnesota Twins (1982–1989); New York Mets (1989–1991); Boston Red Sox (1992–1994); Cincinnati Reds (1995); Toronto Blue Jays (1996)

Career highlights and awards
- 3× All-Star (1988, 1990, 1991); World Series champion (1987); AL Cy Young Award (1988); World Series MVP (1987); MLB wins leader (1988); Minnesota Twins Hall of Fame

Frank John Viola Jr. (/vaɪˈoʊlə/ vy-OH-lə; born April 19, 1960) is an American former starting pitcher in Major League Baseball who played for the Minnesota Twins (1982–1989), New York Mets (1989–1991), Boston Red Sox (1992–1994), Cincinnati Reds (1995), and Toronto Blue Jays (1996). A three-time All-Star, he was named World Series MVP with the Twins in 1987 and won the AL Cy Young Award in 1988. He is the pitching coach of the High Point Rockers.

He batted and threw left-handed, and he was nicknamed "Sweet Music" – a nickname he picked up after a Minnesota sports writer declared that when Viola pitched, there was "Sweet Music" in the Hubert H. Humphrey Metrodome. The nickname was a play on the fact that his last name is also a name of a musical instrument, although pronounced differently. A fan began displaying a banner bearing the phrase in the outfield's upper deck whenever Viola pitched. Twins fans considered the banner to be a good luck charm. The banner is now the property of the Minnesota Historical Society. It was again displayed when Viola was inducted into the Twins Hall of Fame. He was honored as a member of the Twins' "All Dome" team in 2009.

== Biography ==
=== Early life ===
Viola was born and grew up in East Meadow, New York, with his brother John and sister Nancy, and he went on to attend and play baseball for East Meadow High School before playing at the collegiate level for St. John's University. On May 21, 1981, Viola faced future Mets teammate Ron Darling, then playing for Yale University. The game, often considered to be the best in college baseball history, saw Darling pitch 11 innings of no-hit ball before surrendering his only hit, a leadoff single in the 12th, leading to the game's only run. Viola himself threw 11 innings of shutout ball. Viola was drafted following his senior year in the 16th round of the 1979 Major League Baseball draft by the Kansas City Royals, but he did not sign.

=== Minnesota Twins ===
Viola signed with the Minnesota Twins after the team drafted him in the second round of the 1981 Major League Baseball draft. After spending less than a full season in the minor leagues, Viola made his major league debut on June 6, 1982. Although his statistics were fairly disappointing—he finished 11–25 with a 5.37 ERA in the 1982 and 1983 seasons—Viola became a permanent fixture of the Twins' starting staff for the next 7 seasons, picking up 112 of his 176 career wins.

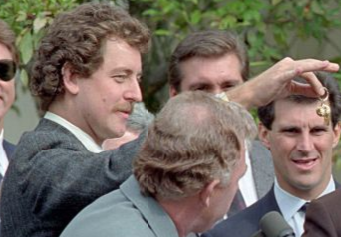
Viola (left) at the White House in 1987

Viola helped pitch the Twins to their second World Series appearance and first World Series win in 1987; he finished the season with a 17–10 record, a 2.90 ERA, and 197 strikeouts in 251 2/3 innings. Viola would then sparkle in the post-season, going a combined 3–1 with 25 strikeouts in 31 1/3 innings despite a 4.31 ERA. Following the Twins' Game 7 series–clinching win—a game which Viola won 4–2—he was named the 1987 World Series Most Valuable Player.

Most baseball enthusiasts agree that Viola's best year was 1988, his last full year with the Twins. That year, he threw his signature circle change with skill, compiling an impressive 24–7 record with 7 complete games and 2 shutouts in 255 innings pitched with a career-low ERA of 2.64. He also gave up only 20 home runs and 54 walks. Viola led the league in wins and would go on to win the AL Cy Young Award in a landslide, finishing with 27 of the 28 first-place votes and beating out second-place Dennis Eckersley by 86 total votes.

=== New York Mets ===
At the trade deadline in July 1989—two years after Viola had led the Twins to a World Series title—the Twins traded him to the New York Mets for four pitchers and a player to be named later. Viola was not having a strong year and was 8–12 when he was traded, but he managed a 5–5 record with the Mets and finished the year at 13–17. Meanwhile, two of the pitchers the Twins acquired in the deal went on to become key members of the team: Kevin Tapani was one of the front-line starters for the Twins in their 1991 World Series run, while Rick Aguilera eventually became the team's closer and one of the best relievers in the major leagues.

Viola had a much better year in 1990, winning 20 games for the second time in his career. He would finish third in the Cy Young Award voting behind Pittsburgh's Doug Drabek and Los Angeles' Ramón Martínez, and he was named to the National League's All-Star Team.

In 1991, Viola made the All-Star Game for a third time after posting an 11–5 record in the first half of the season. However, as the Mets collapsed in the second half of the year to finish with a 78–84 record, Viola collapsed with them and went 2–10 in his final 12 decisions. His last win came in his second-to-last start with the Mets on September 29 at Shea Stadium against the Philadelphia Phillies. He became a free agent after the 1991 season when the Mets opted not to resign Viola.

=== Later career ===
He signed with the Red Sox in January 1992. In a spring training game on April 2, 1993, Viola and Cory Bailey combined on a no-hitter as the Red Sox defeated the Phillies 10–0 at Jack Russell Memorial Stadium in Clearwater, Florida. He was injured while with the Red Sox and underwent Tommy John surgery. He finished his career with the Reds and Blue Jays, ending his career on May 28, 1996. He finished his career with 1844 strikeouts.

=== Postseason ===
He only got one chance in the postseason, and he certainly made the most of it when his Twins faced the St. Louis Cardinals in the World Series. After getting past the Detroit Tigers in the 1987 American League Championship Series, Viola and the Twins had to face the favored Cardinals. Viola pitched Game 1 and led the Twins to a 10–1 rout of the Cards. Viola's second start came in Game 4, and the Twins went on to lose 7–2. After the Twins tied the series in Game 6 with an 11–5 win thanks to a Kent Hrbek grand slam, it was up to Viola in Game 7. He pitched a gem, shutting the Cardinals out after giving up two runs in the second inning. Jeff Reardon pitched the ninth inning, and the Twins won 4–2 on the way to a 4–3 series win. Viola was named World Series MVP.

== Coaching and personal life ==
In retirement, Viola coached baseball for Lake Highland Preparatory School for a time in Orlando, Florida. He also coached with the Florida College Summer League's Leesburg Lightning. In 2009, Viola assisted the Cleveland Indians as a coach in spring training. Frank was also a part-time, substitute game broadcast announcer for NESN, network of the Boston Red Sox. On January 26, 2011, Viola was hired as pitching coach of the Brooklyn Cyclones, the Mets' Single-A (Short Season) team. Viola spent 2012–2013 as the Single-A Affiliate Savannah Sand Gnats pitching coach, winning Coach of the Year in 2013. Following the season, Viola was named the pitching coach for the Las Vegas 51s (now the Las Vegas Aviators), the Mets' Triple-A affiliate in the Pacific Coast League. During a 2014 spring training physical, Viola was diagnosed with a heart condition that required open-heart surgery on April 2. After surgery he signed with the 51s. He continued as the pitching coach for the 51s through the 2017 season. For the 2018 season, Frank served as the pitching coach for the Mets Double-A Binghamton Rumble Ponies. He joined the High Point Rockers of the Atlantic League of Professional Baseball as the pitching coach in 2019, a position he continues to hold in 2024. At that time, he was living in Mooresville, North Carolina.

Daughter Brittany was a diver at the University of Miami, becoming the 2008 and 2011 platform diving NCAA National Champion. Brittany narrowly missed making the 2004 United States Olympic diving team, but later competed at the 2012 London Olympics.

Brittany made Viola a grandfather in August 2014. Daughter Kaley played volleyball at Winthrop University and is now an assistant coach at Davidson College.

Son Frank III attended Florida College and was drafted by the Chicago White Sox in the 29th round of the 2004 MLB draft. Frank III struggled with injuries (including needing Tommy John surgery) and only pitched in 24 games at rookie level Bristol White Sox before being released following the 2007 season. In 2010, he pitched for the independent league St. Paul Saints and was 1–2 with a 4.58 ERA in 21 games before retiring from professional baseball. He now serves as analyst for Bright House Sports Network on their studio show and for their Florida State League broadcasts. Starting in 2012, Frank III has worked with R. A. Dickey and Hall of Fame pitcher Phil Niekro on developing a knuckleball to resurrect his baseball career. In December 2012, he appeared as himself on the How I Met Your Mother episode "The Final Page", where he is on the phone with Marshall, one of the main characters. On March 5, 2014, he was signed by the Toronto Blue Jays to a minor league contract and currently pitches for the Dunedin Blue Jays in the Advanced Single A Florida State League.

== See also ==
- List of Major League Baseball annual wins leaders
- List of Major League Baseball career strikeout leaders
