= Roy Smith (1980s pitcher) =

American baseball player (born 1961)

- Pitcher
- Born: September 6, 1961 (age 64); Mount Vernon, New York, U.S.
- Batted: Right Threw: Right

MLB debut
- June 23, 1984, for the Cleveland Indians

Last MLB appearance
- August 16, 1991, for the Baltimore Orioles

MLB statistics
- Win–loss record: 30–31
- Earned run average: 4.60
- Strikeouts: 320
- Stats at Baseball Reference

Teams
- Cleveland Indians (1984–1985); Minnesota Twins (1986–1990); Baltimore Orioles (1991)

Le Roy Purdy Smith (born September 6, 1961) is an American former professional baseball pitcher and executive. He played all or part of eight seasons in Major League Baseball from 1984 until 1991. He has served as a scout for the New York Mets.

== Playing career ==
Smith was drafted in the 3rd round of the 1979 Major League Baseball draft by the Philadelphia Phillies. After three seasons in the Phillies' farm system, Smith and two other players, were traded to the Cleveland Indians late in the 1982 season for pitcher John Denny.

After another season and a half in the minors, he made his major league debut on June 23, 1984, against the Seattle Mariners, a game in which he also picked up his first major league win.

Smith split 1985 between the major and minor leagues once again, then was traded in the following off-season to the Minnesota Twins in a four-player deal. He continued to shuttle between the majors and minors for three more seasons before finally making the majors to stay in 1989. He had his best season that year, going 10–6 with a 3.92 ERA. He would fall to 5–10 with an ERA nearly a run higher the following season, and was released.

Smith pitched one more season in the majors for the Baltimore Orioles in 1991. He continued to pitch in the minors until 1993, when he retired.

== Baseball executive ==
After spending his final season with the Buffalo Bisons in the Pittsburgh Pirates system, the Pirates made him a scout in 1994. He began as a scouting supervisor for the Pirates in the New England area. In 1995, Smith became scouting supervisor of the southwest portion of the United States. He then moved into the team's front office, first serving as special assistant for the general manager in 1988 before serving as assistant general manager from 1999 until 2004. He then moved on to the Los Angeles Dodgers. There, he worked as their Vice-President for Scouting and Player Development for two seasons, but left the organization along with his boss, Paul DePodesta, and returned to the Pirates. He later worked as a scout for the Toronto Blue Jays. He became a scout for the Mets in November 2010.
