= 1987 World Series =

84th edition of Major League Baseball's championship series

Team (Wins)	Managers	Season
Minnesota Twins (4)	Tom Kelly	85–77 (.525), GA: 2
St. Louis Cardinals (3)	Whitey Herzog	95–67 (.586), GA: 3
- Dates: October 17–25
- Venue(s): Hubert H. Humphrey Metrodome (Minnesota); Busch Memorial Stadium (St. Louis)
- MVP: Frank Viola (Minnesota)
- Umpires: Dave Phillips (AL), Lee Weyer (NL), Greg Kosc (AL), John McSherry (NL), Ken Kaiser (AL), Terry Tata (NL)
- Hall of Famers: Twins: Bert Blyleven; Steve Carlton (DNP); Tony Oliva (coach); Kirby Puckett; Cardinals: Whitey Herzog (manager); Ozzie Smith

Broadcast
- Television: ABC
- TV announcers: Al Michaels, Jim Palmer, and Tim McCarver
- Radio: CBS; KMOX (STL); WCCO (MIN)
- Radio announcers: Jack Buck and Bill White (CBS, KMOX); Herb Carneal and John Gordon (WCCO)
- ALCS: Minnesota Twins over Detroit Tigers (4–1)
- NLCS: St. Louis Cardinals over San Francisco Giants (4–3)

The 1987 World Series was the championship series of Major League Baseball's (MLB) 1987 season. The 84th edition of the World Series, it was a best-of-seven playoff played between the American League (AL) champion Minnesota Twins and the National League (NL) champion St. Louis Cardinals. The Twins defeated the Cardinals in seven games to win their first championship since 1924, when the team was still known as the Washington Senators. Twins pitcher Frank Viola was named as the 1987 World Series MVP.

It was the first World Series to feature games played indoors, and the first in which the home team won every game; this would happen again in 1991 (also a Twins championship, over the Atlanta Braves) and in 2001 with the Arizona Diamondbacks defeating the New York Yankees.

This was the third of six World Series played entirely on artificial turf, with the others in 1980, 1985, 1993, 2020, and 2023.

This is the first World Series in which the series logo appeared on the jerseys; only the Cardinals wore it. Both contestants in the following year's World Series wore a patch. It was also the last World Series in which any games were played during the day as opposed to in the evening.

This was the third consecutive World Series to go the full seven games, a feat that has not occurred since.

This was the only World Series in history in which the bottom of the ninth inning was never played.

With the Twins' win, Major League Baseball extended its record to ten straight unique World Series champions, the longest such streak in all of American major sports history. The next longest streak, nine, was also by MLB, happening between 1982 and 1990.

== Summary ==
The 1987 World Series was the first World Series games played in an indoor stadium (the Hubert H. Humphrey Metrodome) and, to date, the last World Series game to start earlier than prime time in the eastern United States (Game 6 started at 4:00 p.m. ET/3:00 p.m. CT), and it was the first World Series in which all games were won by the home team (four previous series had the home team winning the first six games, including the 1965 World Series, when the Twins dropped Game 7 to the Dodgers); as part of the format of the time, the American League hosted the Series due to it being an odd-numbered year. The bottom half of the ninth inning was never played in any game of this Series, the first and only time this has happened. In 1987, the Twins set the record for the worst (full 162 game) regular season win–loss record of any World Series championship team (85–77, .525). This record stood until it was broken when the Cardinals won the 2006 Series after going 83–78 (.516).

Besides setting a record for the worst regular season winning percentage for a World Series winner and hosting the first World Series game indoors, the Twins were the first team to enter the World Series having been outscored in the regular season. The Twins, as a team, were outnumbered in virtually every major statistical category in 1987. As ABC play-by-play commentator Al Michaels put it in the pre-game show for Game 1, "They were out everything!"

The Cardinals posted a 95–67 record during the regular season, but were hindered by injuries in the postseason, most notably with the loss of their lone home-run threat, first baseman Jack Clark, who sprained his right ankle in a game in Montreal on September 9. During the regular season, Clark led the National League in on-base percentage and slugging percentage despite playing in Busch Memorial Stadium, which was reputed to be the league's most extreme "pitcher's park." He hit 35 home runs in 131 games, and was the only person on the team to hit more than 12. The player on the team who hit 12, starting third baseman Terry Pendleton (though named to the World Series roster) was hampered with a ribcage injury. Normally a switch-hitter, Pendleton was only able to swing lefthanded during the World Series and was also unable to play the field and thus was relegated to pinch-hitting duties or being the designated hitter in the games in Minnesota started by right-handed starters.

Game 7 was won by Minnesota on the 35th birthday of the Twins' Roy Smalley – and was also the last game of his career. Smalley appeared in four games as a pinch-hitter and reached base all four times on a double, an error, and two walks.

AL Minnesota Twins (4) vs. NL St. Louis Cardinals (3)

Game	Date	Score	Location	Time	Attendance
1	October 17	St. Louis Cardinals – 1, Minnesota Twins – 10	Hubert H. Humphrey Metrodome	2:39	55,171
2	October 18	St. Louis Cardinals – 4, Minnesota Twins – 8	Hubert H. Humphrey Metrodome	2:42	55,257
3	October 20	Minnesota Twins – 1, St. Louis Cardinals – 3	Busch Stadium	2:45	55,347
4	October 21	Minnesota Twins – 2, St. Louis Cardinals – 7	Busch Stadium	3:11	55,347
5	October 22	Minnesota Twins – 2, St. Louis Cardinals – 4	Busch Stadium	3:21	55,347
6	October 24	St. Louis Cardinals – 5, Minnesota Twins – 11	Hubert H. Humphrey Metrodome	3:04	55,293
7	October 25	St. Louis Cardinals – 2, Minnesota Twins – 4	Hubert H. Humphrey Metrodome	3:04	55,376

== Matchups ==
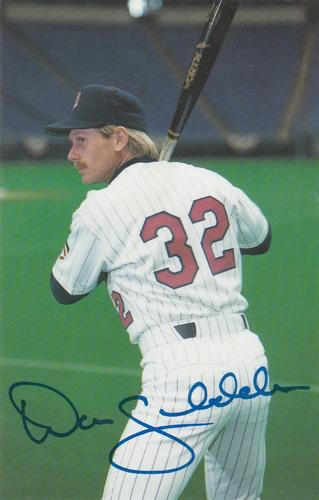
Twins outfielder Dan Gladden recorded a grand slam and five RBIs in Game 1.

=== Game 1 ===
Saturday, October 17, 1987 7:30 pm (CT) at Hubert H. Humphrey Metrodome in Minneapolis, Minnesota 73 °F (23 °C), dome
Team	1	2	3	4	5	6	7	8	9	R	H	E
St. Louis	0	1	0	0	0	0	0	0	0	1	5	1
Minnesota	0	0	0	7	2	0	1	0	X	10	11	0
WP: Frank Viola (1–0) LP: Joe Magrane (0–1); Home runs: STL: None; MIN: Dan Gladden (1), Steve Lombardozzi (1)

A raucous, sold-out Metrodome met the Cardinals on October 17, stunning the visitors with crowd noise that reached 125 decibels SPL, making it the loudest game in World Series history. The Cardinals struggled defensively, with outfielder Willie McGee losing sight of pop flies against the Metrodome's white roof in the fourth and eighth innings, and infielder Tom Lawless committing an infield error in the sixth inning. None of those miscues, however, contributed to Twins runs. The Twins' aggressive play further compounded the problems of the Cards, and the game ended as a 10–1 blowout. Starting pitcher Frankie "Sweet Music" Viola had little trouble with the Cardinals' potent lineup. For the Twins, Dan Gladden hit a grand slam (the first since 1970) and totaled five RBIs, capping off a seven-run fourth inning, with Steve Lombardozzi adding a two-run homer, while Kent Hrbek had two RBIs.

Frank Viola was scheduled to be best man at his brother's wedding, but had to cancel when the Twins reached the World Series as it fell on the same night as Game 1, in which he was scheduled as starter. ABC showed clips of the wedding throughout the game's broadcast.

Coincidentally, the song "U Got The Look" peaked in popularity (#2 on the Billboard singles chart) on this date. The song was written and performed by Prince (a Minneapolis native) and contains the line "boy versus girl in the World Series of love".

=== Game 2 ===
Sunday, October 18, 1987 7:25 pm (CT) at Hubert H. Humphrey Metrodome in Minneapolis, Minnesota 73 °F (23 °C), dome
Team	1	2	3	4	5	6	7	8	9	R	H	E
St. Louis	0	0	0	0	1	0	1	2	0	4	9	0
Minnesota	0	1	0	6	0	1	0	0	X	8	10	0
WP: Bert Blyleven (1–0) LP: Danny Cox (0–1); Home runs: STL: None; MIN: Gary Gaetti (1), Tim Laudner (1)

While improving on their Game One performance, the Cards were again unable to hold the Twins offense and fell behind 7–0 before beginning to rally. The Cards' total of nine hits was just one short of the Twins but they managed only one double, against three doubles and two home runs hit by Minnesota. Gary Gaetti hit a homer in the second inning. The Twins broke the game open in the fourth, scoring six runs resulting in starter Danny Cox being pulled from the game. The final score was 8–4. Randy Bush and Tim Laudner each came through with a pair of two-run-scoring hits in the fourth, with Laudner's being a home run and Bush's being a double. Bert Blyleven pitched seven innings of two-run baseball for the win.

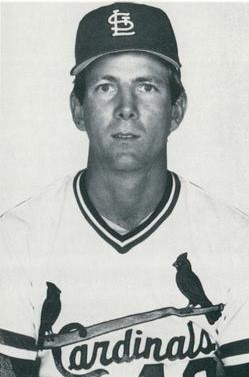
John Tudor allowed one run in Game 3 and earned the win.

=== Game 3 ===
Tuesday, October 20, 1987 7:30 pm (CT) at Busch Stadium in St. Louis, Missouri 44 °F (7 °C), mostly cloudy
Team	1	2	3	4	5	6	7	8	9	R	H	E
Minnesota	0	0	0	0	0	1	0	0	0	1	5	1
St. Louis	0	0	0	0	0	0	3	0	X	3	9	1
WP: John Tudor (1–0) LP: Juan Berenguer (0–1) Sv: Todd Worrell (1)

Traveling down the Mississippi, to the open air of Busch Stadium, Game 3 saw a tense pitching duel between Twins starter Les Straker and John Tudor of the Cardinals. This match-up was also notable for Straker being the first Venezuelan to pitch in a World Series game.

After five scoreless innings by both teams, the Twins broke through in the top of the sixth inning. Greg Gagne walked to lead off the inning, and Kirby Puckett walked to move Gagne into scoring position. Tom Brunansky's RBI single looked like all the offense the game would see. But, in the bottom of the seventh, Juan Berenguer, in relief of Straker, surrendered leadoff back-to-back singles to Jose Oquendo and Tony Peña. Terry Pendleton sacrificed the runners to second and third, and Vince Coleman slammed a two-run double to give the Cards a 2–1 lead. Ozzie Smith followed by singling in Coleman for the final run, and Todd Worrell closed out saving the win for Tudor.

=== Game 4 ===
Wednesday, October 21, 1987 7:25 pm (CT) at Busch Stadium in St. Louis, Missouri 43 °F (6 °C), mostly clear
Team	1	2	3	4	5	6	7	8	9	R	H	E
Minnesota	0	0	1	0	1	0	0	0	0	2	7	1
St. Louis	0	0	1	6	0	0	0	0	X	7	10	1
WP: Bob Forsch (1–0) LP: Frank Viola (1–1) Sv: Ken Dayley (1); Home runs: MIN: Greg Gagne (1); STL: Tom Lawless (1)

In Game 4, the Twins scored first on Greg Gagne’s home run, but the Cardinals tied it on a Jim Lindeman RBI single. Tom Lawless hit a three-run homer in the fourth off Viola (only his second Major League homer after going 2 for 25 during the regular season), one of Viola's five earned runs in the game and six runs in the fourth. The Cards weren't done scoring; Dan Schatzeder allowed another RBI single to Lindeman and a two-run double to Willie McGee. Joe Niekro and George Frazier shut the Redbirds out the rest of the game. Bob Forsch got the win with 2 2/3 innings of one run relief. Starter Greg Mathews aggravated a quadriceps injury in the fourth inning (the injury went back to Game 5 of the NLCS), had to be removed from the game and was unable to play for the rest of the series. Ken Dayley got the save.

Just prior to Game 4, Reggie Jackson, who was working as a field reporter for ABC's coverage of the 1987 World Series, admitted that he didn't know who Tom Lawless was.

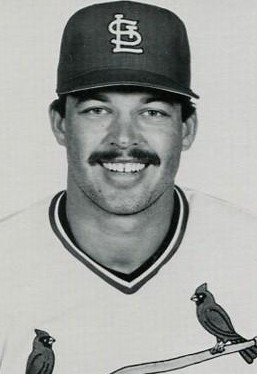
Danny Cox allowed no runs on the mound and was credited with the win in Game 5.

=== Game 5 ===
Thursday, October 22, 1987 7:25 pm (CT) at Busch Stadium in St. Louis, Missouri 64 °F (18 °C), partly cloudy
Team	1	2	3	4	5	6	7	8	9	R	H	E
Minnesota	0	0	0	0	0	0	0	2	0	2	6	1
St. Louis	0	0	0	0	0	3	1	0	X	4	10	0
WP: Danny Cox (1–1) LP: Bert Blyleven (1–1) Sv: Todd Worrell (2)

Game 5 was a much closer contest, with the Cardinals coming out victorious by a score of 4–2. Curt Ford hit a two-run single in the sixth, breaking a scoreless pitcher's duel between Danny Cox and Bert Blyleven. By the end of the seventh, the Cards were up 4–0. The Twins scored two in the eighth on a triple by Gary Gaetti off reliever Todd Worrell to make a game of it, but eventually relinquished the save to him as Gaetti failed to score. The Cardinals stole five bases in Game 5, the most for any team since the 1907 Chicago Cubs.

=== Game 6 ===
Saturday, October 24, 1987 3:00 pm (CT) at Hubert H. Humphrey Metrodome in Minneapolis, Minnesota 73 °F (23 °C), dome
Team	1	2	3	4	5	6	7	8	9	R	H	E
St. Louis	1	1	0	2	1	0	0	0	0	5	11	2
Minnesota	2	0	0	0	4	4	0	1	X	11	15	0
WP: Dan Schatzeder (1–0) LP: John Tudor (1–1); Home runs: STL: Tom Herr (1); MIN: Don Baylor (1), Kent Hrbek (1)

Cardinals Second Baseman Tommy Herr.

The Series returned to the Metrodome with the Twins facing elimination (a position they would find themselves in four years later against the Atlanta Braves). ABC allowed the game to be played at 3 p.m. CT (4 p.m. ET) on Saturday afternoon – the only day game of the series, and the last World Series game to date to be played in the daytime (although as the game was played in the Metrodome, the game took place under artificial lighting).

The Cardinals drew first blood off Les Straker on a Tommy Herr home run in the first, and the Twins countered with two in their half of the first on RBI singles by Kirby Puckett and Don Baylor. The Cardinals soon tied it in the second on a Jose Oquendo RBI single.

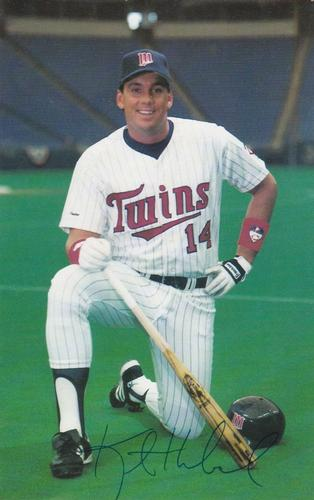
Twins First Baseman Kent Hrbek hit a grand slam during Game 6.

In the fourth, the Cards chased Straker when Dan Driessen led off with a double to right and went to third on a Willie McGee single. McGee took second on the attempted throw home by center fielder Kirby Puckett. Terry Pendleton followed by singling home Driessen and Oquendo hit a sacrifice fly to make it 4–2. Another run scored for the Cards in the fifth when lefty Dan Schatzeder walked Ozzie Smith. Smith went to second on a groundout, to third on a flyout, and scored on another McGee single.

In the bottom of the fifth, however, the Twins began to claw their way back against John Tudor. It happened immediately as Minnesota was able to tie the game in only five pitches. Puckett led off with a single and was doubled in by Gary Gaetti. Benefitting from use of the designated hitter in their home ballpark, the Twins then tied it on a mammoth home run by their DH, Don Baylor. After Tom Brunansky followed with a single off the first pitch and chased Tudor, the Twins took the lead for good when Steve Lombardozzi singled him in with two out on a close play at the plate.

The Twins then blew the game open in the sixth. Greg Gagne led off with an infield single and Puckett walked. A passed ball by Tony Peña advanced the runners. With first base open and one out, Cards veteran Bob Forsch intentionally walked Baylor to load the bases. Baylor had played only 20 regular season games with the Twins after being traded from Boston and Tim McCarver in the ABC broadcast booth argued that he should be pitched to rather than walked, despite the home run in the previous inning. Both Jim Palmer and Al Michaels agreed, as Palmer didn't like the idea of loading the bases with the risk of giving up multiple runs, and Michaels pointed out that left-hander Ken Dayley might have to be brought in earlier than normal. After Brunansky popped out, Dayley was indeed brought in to face the lefty-hitting Kent Hrbek. Hrbek finally broke out of his slump and hit a grand slam to the deepest part of center field.

Brunansky drove in the final run in the eighth and the Twins had staved off defeat. This was the last day game in World Series history to date.

=== Game 7 ===
Sunday, October 25, 1987 7:25 pm (CT) at Hubert H. Humphrey Metrodome in Minneapolis, Minnesota 73 °F (23 °C), dome
Team	1	2	3	4	5	6	7	8	9	R	H	E
St. Louis	0	2	0	0	0	0	0	0	0	2	6	1
Minnesota	0	1	0	0	1	1	0	1	X	4	10	0
WP: Frank Viola (2–1) LP: Danny Cox (1–2) Sv: Jeff Reardon (1)

Game 7 forced a National Football League game between the Denver Broncos and the Minnesota Vikings, originally scheduled for that afternoon at the Metrodome, to be played the following night (also on ABC).

Joe Magrane of the St. Louis Cardinals became only the sixth rookie pitcher to start the seventh game of a World Series. He also is the first of only two pitchers in World Series history to start Games 1 and 7 of a World Series without any starts in between (the other is Max Scherzer in 2019), as the Cardinals' Game 4 starter, Greg Mathews, had to be removed early due to an injury and was unavailable for the remainder of the Series. Magrane had actually started the 1987 season pitching for the Cardinals Triple-A team, the Louisville Redbirds.

In the second, the Cardinals looked poised to send Frank Viola to an early shower. Three straight no-out singles by Jim Lindeman, Willie McGee, and Tony Peña plated the first run. Viola settled down to retire the next two hitters, but then Steve Lake singled in McGee for a 2–0 lead. Viola settled into a groove, however, and allowed only two more hits and no runs in eight strong innings.

Willie McGee was the final out in the series.

The Twins came back in their half of the second on a Steve Lombardozzi RBI single, but not before a missed call at home plate by umpire Dave Phillips had already cost the Twins a run. Twins DH Don Baylor reached base on a hit-by-pitch by Magrane to lead off the inning and Tom Brunansky singled him to second. With one out, Tim Laudner singled to left and Baylor was called out at home on a throw from Vince Coleman in left, while replays clearly showed Baylor was safe. Lombardozzi then singled in Brunansky.

In the fifth, the Twins tied the score when Greg Gagne reached on an infield hit and Kirby Puckett drove him in with a double. Incidentally, replays showed Gagne to be out on his infield hit, thus this run served to counteract the run the Twins lost in the second on the missed call on Baylor at the plate. The Twins seemed on the verge of taking the lead when Gary Gaetti followed Puckett with a walk and went to second when Puckett was thrown out by Lake trying to advance to third on a wild pitch that was deflected when it hit the home plate umpire in the face-mask. Baylor followed with a single to left, but Coleman threw out Gaetti at the plate in a violent collision with Lake. Coleman became the first outfielder to throw two runners out at the plate in one World Series game.

The sixth inning proved to be controversial. In the top of the sixth, Tom Herr had hit a single with one out. With Jim Lindeman at bat, the third missed call of the game would occur. On a 3-2 count, Herr would get caught in a rundown and Lombardozzi ran him back to first where Kent Hrbek was standing off the bag near the basepath. Lombardozzi tossed the ball towards Hrbek and the ball sailed past him but into the glove of Viola behind the bag. Viola had come over to take part in the rundown. Herr was hindered by Hrbek returning to the bag, but clearly reached the bag safely before Viola tagged him. However, first base umpire Lee Weyer called Herr out. Weyer's view was blocked by Kent Hrbek and, according to the broadcast crew, Viola made the tag late and Hrbek should have been called for obstruction. Had this been called, Herr would have been safe, awarded second base, and the Cardinals would have had a runner at second with one out. It was the third missed call of the game for the normally highly regarded Weyer—often considered one of the best umpires in baseball—-and the fourth of the game total with Phillips’ missed call on Baylor in the 2nd. Two of the four missed calls had direct effects on the score, but they cancelled each other out, as one cost the Twins a run while another led to their scoring a gift run in the 5th. The Herr call did not directly affect the score because on the next pitch, Lindeman flied out to right field to end the 6th inning and Viola also retired the first batter of the following inning. The Twins then took the lead in the bottom of the inning, off Danny Cox, who had relieved Magrane the previous inning. Cox walked Brunansky and Hrbek to lead off, and was replaced by Todd Worrell. As Cox was leaving, he got into an argument with home plate umpire Dave Phillips and was ejected as he was leaving the field. As of 2020, Cox is the last non-manager to be ejected from a World Series game. After retiring the first batter he faced, Worrell walked pinch-hitter Roy Smalley and struck out Dan Gladden for the second out. The next batter, Gagne, reached first on an infield hit as Brunansky scored the go-ahead run.

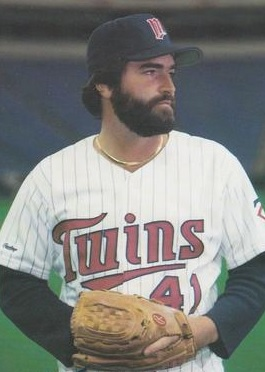
Jeff Reardon pitched a scoreless ninth inning to give the Twins their first world championship.

The Twins' final run came in the eighth on an RBI double by Dan Gladden off Worrell, who stayed in the rest of the game for the Cardinals. Jeff Reardon retired the side in the ninth to give Minnesota their first World Series victory.

With the victory, Tom Kelly became, at 37, the third youngest manager (and the youngest non-playing manager) to win a World Series. Only John McGraw, who won the 1905 World Series at 32, and Frank Chance, who won the 1907 World Series at 30, are younger.

== Composite box ==
1987 World Series (4–3): Minnesota Twins (A.L.) over St. Louis Cardinals (N.L.)

Team	1	2	3	4	5	6	7	8	9	R	H	E
Minnesota Twins	2	2	1	13	8	7	1	4	0	38	64	3
St. Louis Cardinals	1	4	1	8	2	3	5	2	0	26	60	6
Total attendance: 387,138 Average attendance: 55,305; Winning player's share: $85,581 Losing player's share: $56,053

== Aftermath ==
Twins manager Tom Kelly became the youngest non-playing manager to win the World Series since John McGraw in 1905.

This was the first major professional sports championship won by a Minneapolis-St. Paul-based team since 1954, when the then-Minneapolis Lakers completed the NBA’s first three-peat before their move to Los Angeles.

By winning in the regulation nine innings, the Twins ensured the 1987 World Series was the first in which no games needed the bottom of the ninth inning. No other World Series since then has had that happen, as the two other Fall Classics in which the home team won every game—1991 and 2001—both included extra inning games and walk-off wins in the bottom of the ninth.

Although Steve Carlton was not on the Twins' playoff roster, he still attended the White House to be congratulated by President Reagan. While making a photo op with the president, local newspapers listed the names of all of the Minnesota Twins. The only man who wasn't listed (and simply identified as a Secret Service agent) was a tall man wearing dark sunglasses in the back. The man in question was Carlton.

After their defeat in the '87 Series, the Cardinals' reign of dominance in the '80s ended. They failed to win their division again until 1996, did not return to the World Series until 2004 and did not win until 2006 in a season where they won two fewer regular season games than the 1987 Twins.

In 1988, the Twins actually won more games than in their championship season, finishing with a 91–71 record. In spite of this improvement, they finished 13 games behind the AL West champion Oakland A's, who won 104 games. The Twins eventually sank towards the bottom of the standings, finishing last in 1990. In 1991, the Twins returned to the playoffs by beating the Blue Jays in the ALCS and winning what many call the greatest World Series ever played, over the Atlanta Braves.

The 1987 World Series featured at least two players who went on to win Manager of the Year awards. The Twins' Don Baylor won it in 1995 for his work with the Colorado Rockies while the Cardinals' Tony Peña won it in 2003 for his efforts with the Kansas City Royals.

The success of the 1987 Twins inspired Brandon Walsh (Jason Priestley) in Beverly Hills 90210 to explain why the Twins were the ultimate definition of a team, thus enabling him to win the Dreyer Scholarship. His interview, however, included a factual inaccuracy; he said Gladden hit a grand slam in Game 4, when in fact Gladden hit one in Game 1, and Hrbek hit one in the pivotal Game 6.

Some years after the conclusion of the series it emerged that a lone Metrodome technician had, at his own initiative, tried to influence games on the Twins behalf by adjusting the air conditioning fans while the Twins were at bat. It remains unclear whether this had any effect on game play, or in particular, on games played at the Metrodome during the 1987 World Series.

In a February 2015 interview, sportscaster and author Al Michaels (who, as previously mentioned, did play-by-play for ABC's television coverage of the 1987 World Series) alleged the Twins pumped artificial crowd noise into the Metrodome during the 1987 World Series. Responding to Michaels' theory, Twins President Dave St. Peter said that he did not think the Twins needed "conspiracy theories" in order to win the World Series. Instead, he argued that "appreciation and respect" should be paid to players like Frank Viola, Gary Gaetti, Kent Hrbek, and Kirby Puckett, who, he said, "came out of nowhere to win a championship."

The 1987 World Series was the final one that ABC aired that went the full seven games. The next time that ABC broadcast a World Series, in 1989, the Oakland Athletics swept the San Francisco Giants in four games. For the final World Series that ABC would broadcast to date, 1995, they split the coverage with NBC. ABC only covered Games 1, 4 and 5, and would have broadcast a seventh game had it been necessary. As in 1985 and 1989, the 1987 World Series was simulcast in Canada through the Global Television Network.

As of 2026, this is also the last time where three consecutive World Series went to seven games (1985, 1986, 1987).

== See also ==
- 1987 Japan Series
