= Gary Gaetti =

American baseball player (born 1958)

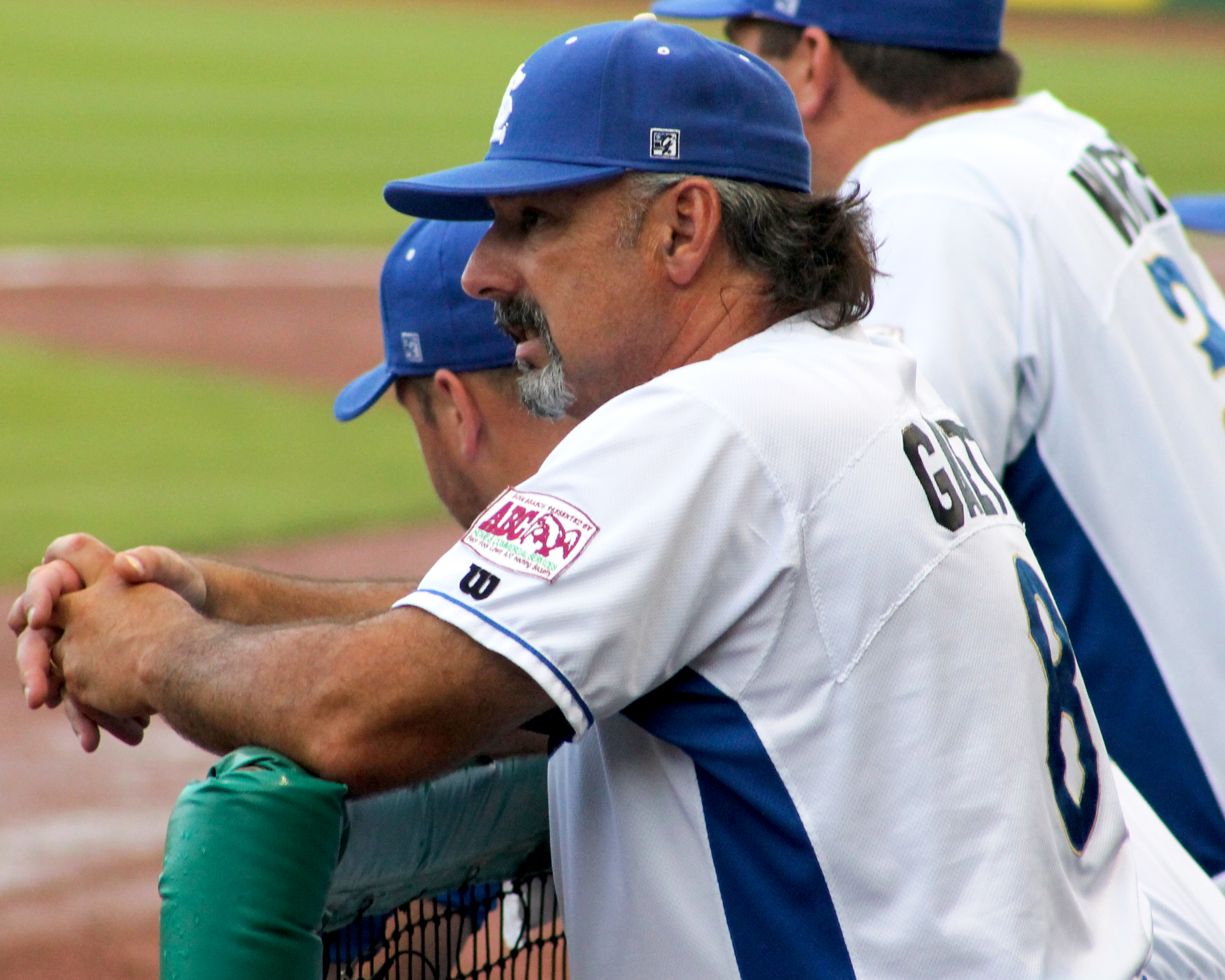
- Gaetti with the Sugar Land Skeeters in 2014
- Third baseman
- Born: August 19, 1958 (age 68); Centralia, Illinois, U.S.
- Batted: Right Threw: Right

MLB debut
- September 20, 1981, for the Minnesota Twins

Last MLB appearance
- April 12, 2000, for the Boston Red Sox

MLB statistics
- Batting average: .255
- Hits: 2,280
- Home runs: 360
- Runs batted in: 1,341
- Stats at Baseball Reference

Teams
- As player: Minnesota Twins (1981–1990); California Angels (1991–1993); Kansas City Royals (1993–1995); St. Louis Cardinals (1996–1998); Chicago Cubs (1998–1999); Boston Red Sox (2000); As coach: Houston Astros (2004–2006)

Career highlights and awards
- 2× All-Star (1988, 1989); World Series champion (1987); ALCS MVP (1987); 4× Gold Glove Award (1986–1989); Silver Slugger Award (1995); Minnesota Twins Hall of Fame

Gary Joseph Gaetti (/ɡaɪˈɛtiː/ gy-EHT-ee; born August 19, 1958) is an American former professional baseball third baseman. He played in Major League Baseball (MLB) for the Minnesota Twins (1981–1990), California Angels (1991–1993), Kansas City Royals (1993–1995), St. Louis Cardinals (1996–1998), Chicago Cubs (1998–1999) and Boston Red Sox (2000).

Gaetti won a World Series with Minnesota in 1987 and was the MVP of that year's American League Championship Series against the Detroit Tigers. In 1987, Gaetti became the first player ever to hit home runs in his first two postseason plate appearances. Gaetti also managed the independent league Sugar Land Skeeters from 2012 to 2017.

== Playing career ==
Gaetti played collegiate baseball for Lake Land College in Mattoon, Illinois, and Northwest Missouri State University. Gaetti was drafted three times before finally signing with the Twins — first by the St. Louis Cardinals in the fourth round of the 1978 Major League Baseball draft (then held annually in January) and again in 1978 by the Chicago White Sox in the third round of the June secondary draft before he was drafted by the Twins in the first round of the June secondary portion of the 1979 draft. Gaetti signed on June 21, 1979.

Gaetti then spent the next three years in the Twins' minor league system, playing for the rookie level Elizabethton Twins in the Appalachian League in 1979, the A-level Wisconsin Rapids Twins in the Midwest League in 1980, and the AA-level Orlando Twins in the Southern League in 1981. Gaetti then made his major league debut in nine September games and he hit a home run off of Charlie Hough in his first major league at-bat. In 1982, Gaetti would become a permanent fixture at third base for the Twins and would man third base in Minnesota for the next nine seasons.

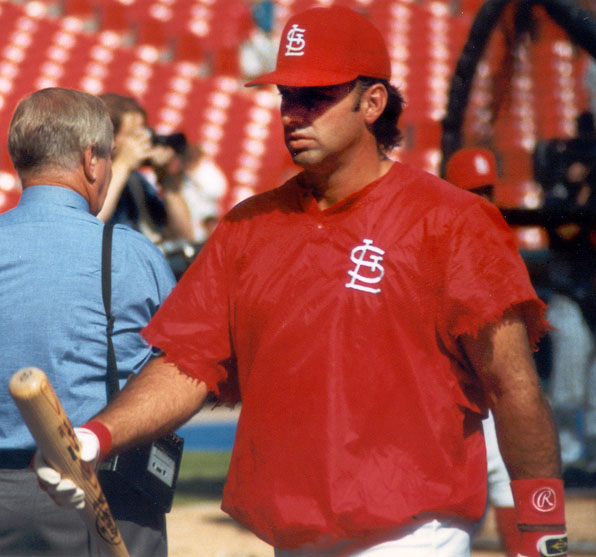
Gaetti with St. Louis

In 1986, Gaetti batted .287 with 34 home runs and 108 runs batted in. Gaetti won four consecutive Gold Glove Awards for fielding excellence from 1986 through 1989. Gaetti helped propel the Twins to the 1987 post-season and their first World Series championship, hitting .257 with 31 home runs and 109 RBI. He also hit himself into the record books, with home runs in his first two career postseason plate appearances in the American League Championship Series to help the Twins upset the Detroit Tigers.

Gaetti was selected as an All-Star in 1988 and 1989. Playing against the Boston Red Sox on July 17, 1990, Gaetti helped the Twins become the only team in baseball history to turn two triple plays in the same game. Despite their defensive heroics, the Twins lost the game 1–0.

His production at the plate would decline and after hitting only .229 in 1990, Gaetti left the Twins for the Angels as a free agent. His production continued to drop off with the Angels and midway through the third year of his four-year contract, he was released, in June 1993. He was almost immediately signed by the Royals, who had lost their projected regular third baseman, Keith Miller, to injury and had been playing rookie Phil Hiatt at third. Gaetti hit 26 home runs for the Royals in 665 at-bats between 1993 and 1994, splitting time at third with Miller, David Howard, and Terry Shumpert. In 1995, Gaetti played in 137 games and at the age of 36, he hit .261 with 35 home runs and 96 RBI, winning his only Silver Slugger, setting a career high in home runs and missing the Royals' team record for most home runs in a season by one.

Following the 1995 season, Gaetti signed as a free agent with the Cardinals, where he enjoyed two more productive seasons before being released again in August 1998 after the Cardinals' acquisition of Fernando Tatís. Gaetti immediately signed with the Cubs, where he hit .320/8/27 as the Cubs won the National League wild card. The following season, Gaetti played only semi-regularly and was released at the end of the season after hitting .204 with nine home runs. He wound up his career the following season in Boston, appearing in five games in April 2000 at the age of 41.

Bill James noted Gaetti's baseball-related aging process as being unusual for two reasons. Unlike most other league veterans, his walk rate never improved and his rate of productivity decline was "exceptionally" slow. Gaetti was used as an emergency relief pitcher by both the Cardinals and the Cubs, retiring with an ERA of 7.71 and one strikeout in three appearances.

Gaetti finished in the top 25 voting for American League Most Valuable Player four times in his career, three times with the Minnesota Twins (1986–1988), and once with the Kansas City Royals (1995). He finished fifth in American League Rookie of the Year voting (1982). He was a four-time Golden Glove Award winner (1986-1989). His 2,280 total base hits rank him 161st in the history of Major League Baseball.

With seven defensive triple plays in his career, Gaetti is tied with six other players for the third-most triple plays in a career. Jake Beckley and Germany Smith both had eight, while Donie Bush, Bid McPhee, and John Morrill all share the record at nine.

== Retirement ==
Gaetti was inducted into the NWMSU athletic hall of fame, the "M-Club", in October 2003. He coached in the Houston Astros minor league system as a hitting coach with the AAA New Orleans Zephyrs from 2002 to 2004. Gaetti was promoted to hitting coach for the Astros on July 14, 2004, when the team dismissed manager Jimy Williams, hitting coach Harry Spilman, and pitching coach Burt Hooton. Gaetti remained in this position until July 12, 2006, when he was fired by the Astros. Following the season, he was hired as the hitting coach for Tampa Bay's AAA affiliate, the Durham Bulls — a position he would hold through the 2008 season. After working at Baseball USA in Houston, Texas, in 2011, Gaetti was named the first manager of the Sugar Land Skeeters. The independent team began play in 2012. During his six seasons as manager, he led them to a 448-391 overall record. In 2013, his team set the ALPB record in games won (95) and winning percentage (.679) in a season. He took them to two championship series (2014 and 2016) winning Sugar Land's first championship in 2016. The Skeeters retired his number on August 21, 2021.

On August 19, 2007, Gaetti's 49th birthday, the Minnesota Twins inducted him into the team's Hall of Fame, while the club simultaneously released a commemorative bobblehead in his honor.

Gaetti's son Joe played collegiate baseball for North Carolina State and played in the minor leagues in five different farm systems, including two separate stints with the Twins AA-level club, the New Britain Rock Cats. After failing to advance beyond the AAA level in the minor leagues, Joe ended his career in 2010 playing for the Lancaster Barnstormers of the independent Atlantic League.

== Personal life ==
Gaetti became a born-again Christian while recovering from season-ending knee surgery he underwent late in the 1988 season.

In 2020, Gaetti opened the Gaetti Sports Academy to support practice and instruction for softball and baseball for area youth.

== See also ==
- List of Major League Baseball career home run leaders
- List of Major League Baseball career hits leaders
- List of Major League Baseball career doubles leaders
- List of Major League Baseball career runs scored leaders
- List of Major League Baseball career runs batted in leaders
- List of Major League Baseball players with a home run in their first major league at bat

Awards and achievements
Preceded by Dennis Martínez	Oldest Player in the National League; 1999	Succeeded by Jesse Orosco
