= Nashville Xpress all-time roster =

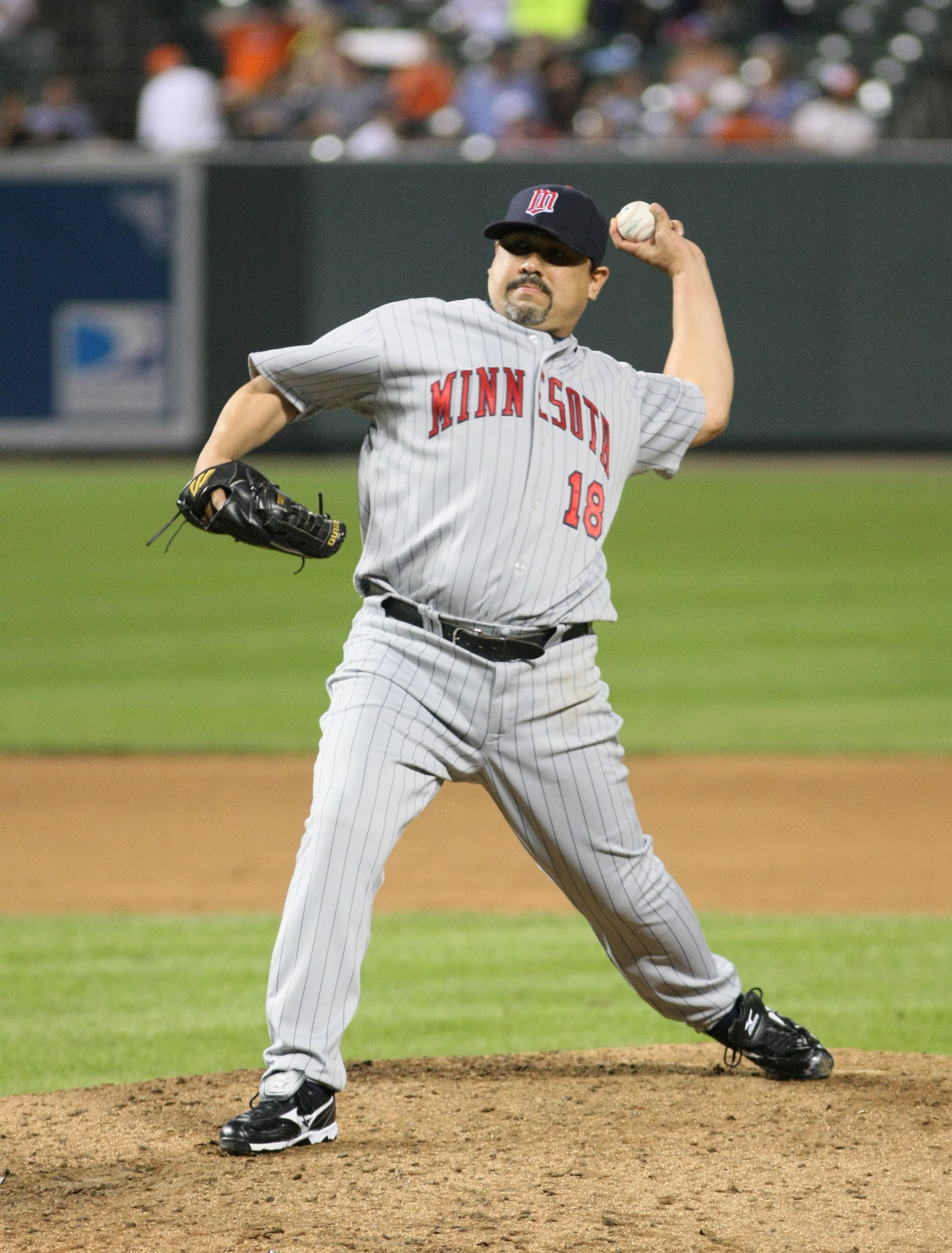
Eddie Guardado, a pitcher for the 1993 Xpress, was called up after 10 starts to make his MLB debut with the Minnesota Twins on June 13, 1993.

The Nashville Xpress Minor League Baseball team played two seasons in Nashville, Tennessee, from 1993 to 1994 as the Double-A affiliate of the Minnesota Twins. In those seasons, a total of 60 players competed in at least one game for the Xpress. The 1993 roster included a total of 35 players, while 38 played for the team in 1994. There were 13 players who were members of the team in both seasons. Of the 60 all-time Xpress players, 22 also played in at least one game for a Major League Baseball (MLB) team during their careers.

After the 1992 baseball season, Charlotte, North Carolina, home of the Double-A Southern League's Charlotte Knights, acquired a Triple-A expansion team in the International League, leaving the Southern League franchise in need of a new home. Larry Schmittou, president of the Triple-A Nashville Sounds, offered Herschel Greer Stadium as a temporary home for the displaced team until owner George Shinn could find a permanent home for his club. Upon the league's approval, the franchise relocated to Nashville and became the Nashville Xpress. In order to accommodate two teams at Greer, the Xpress' games were scheduled for during the Sounds' road trips.

As no other solution could be reached for 1994, Schmittou allowed the franchise to remain at Greer for a second season. Meanwhile, in October 1993, Dennis Bastien purchased the Xpress with the intention of moving the club to Lexington, Kentucky, for the 1995 season, but those plans fell through when he was unable to broker a financial deal with the city to build a ballpark. Bastien later arrived at terms to relocate to Springfield, Missouri, in 1997. The Xpress left Nashville after the 1994 campaign to play on an interim basis in Wilmington, North Carolina, where they were known as the Port City Roosters in 1995 and 1996. The team, however, never made it to Springfield after the city was unable to secure federal funding for a ballpark. The forlorn franchise was subsequently sold and placed in Mobile, Alabama, as the Mobile BayBears in 1997.

Nashville pitcher Oscar Múñoz and outfielder Rich Becker were selected for the 1993 Double-A All-Star Game. Becker was also named to the Southern League's postseason All-Star team. Múñoz was chosen to receive the 1993 Southern League Most Outstanding Pitcher Award. In 1994, Xpress pitchers LaTroy Hawkins and Marc Barcelo were selected for the Double-A All-Star Game, and right-hander Brad Radke was named to the league's postseason All-Star squad.

Three players went on to be selected to play in Major League Baseball All-Star Games after their stints in Nashville: Eddie Guardado (2002 & 2003), Damian Miller (2002), and Brad Radke (1998). In 1995, Marty Cordova was voted the American League Rookie of the Year. Three Xpress players also played for the Nashville Sounds: LaTroy Hawkins (2010–11), Todd Ritchie (1999), and Scott Cepicky (1993—one season before playing for the Xpress).

== Table key ==
Position(s)	The player's primary fielding position(s) (Note: Players are listed at a position if they appeared in 30% of their games or more at that position during their Xpress career, as defined by Baseball-Reference.)
Notes	Statistics shown only for playing time with the Xpress
MLB	Indicates that a player played in at least one game for a major league team
†	Player was an MLB award winner or All-Star after playing for the Xpress

== Players ==
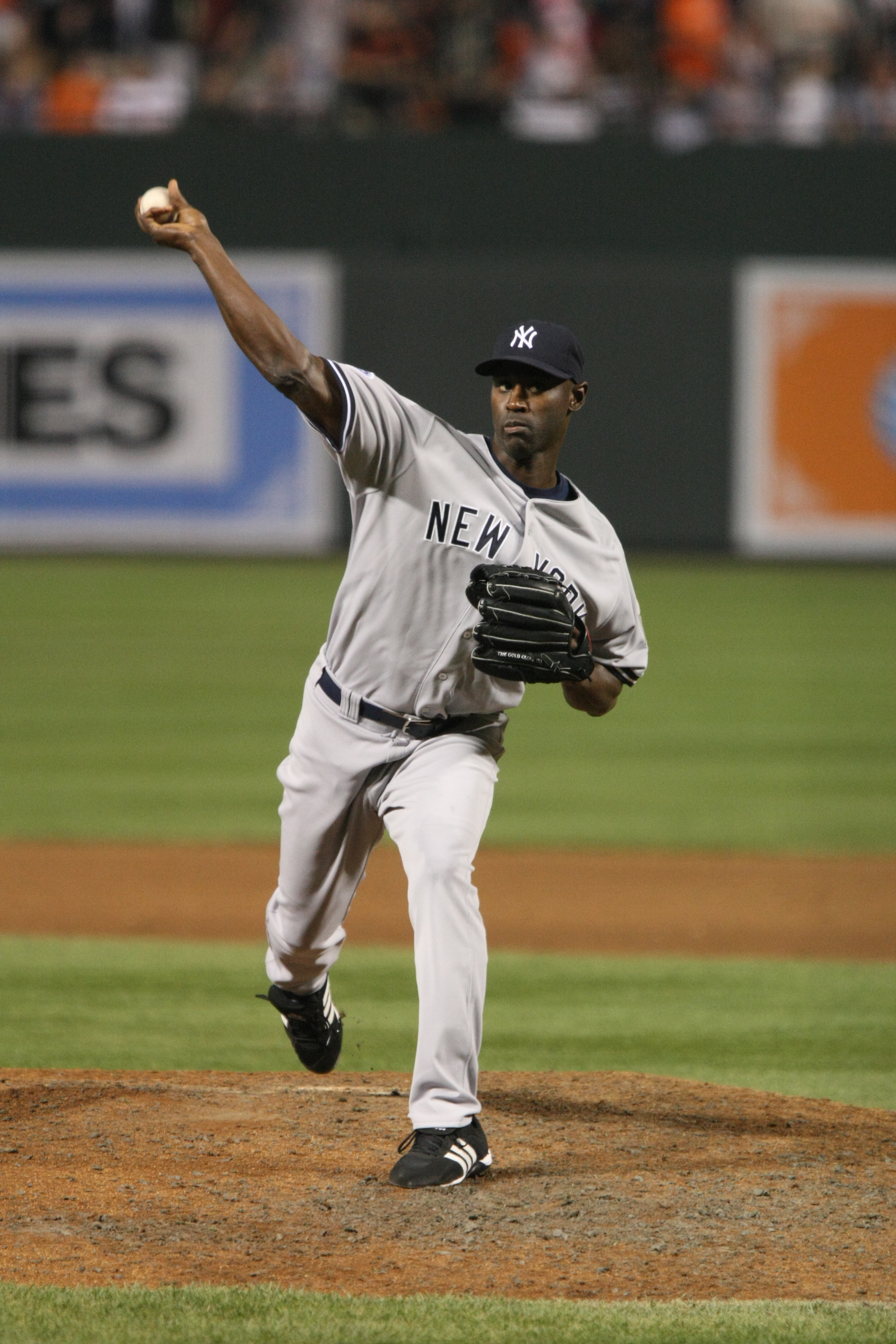
LaTroy Hawkins, who pitched for the 1994 Xpress, went on to appear in 1,042 big league games over his 21-year MLB career.

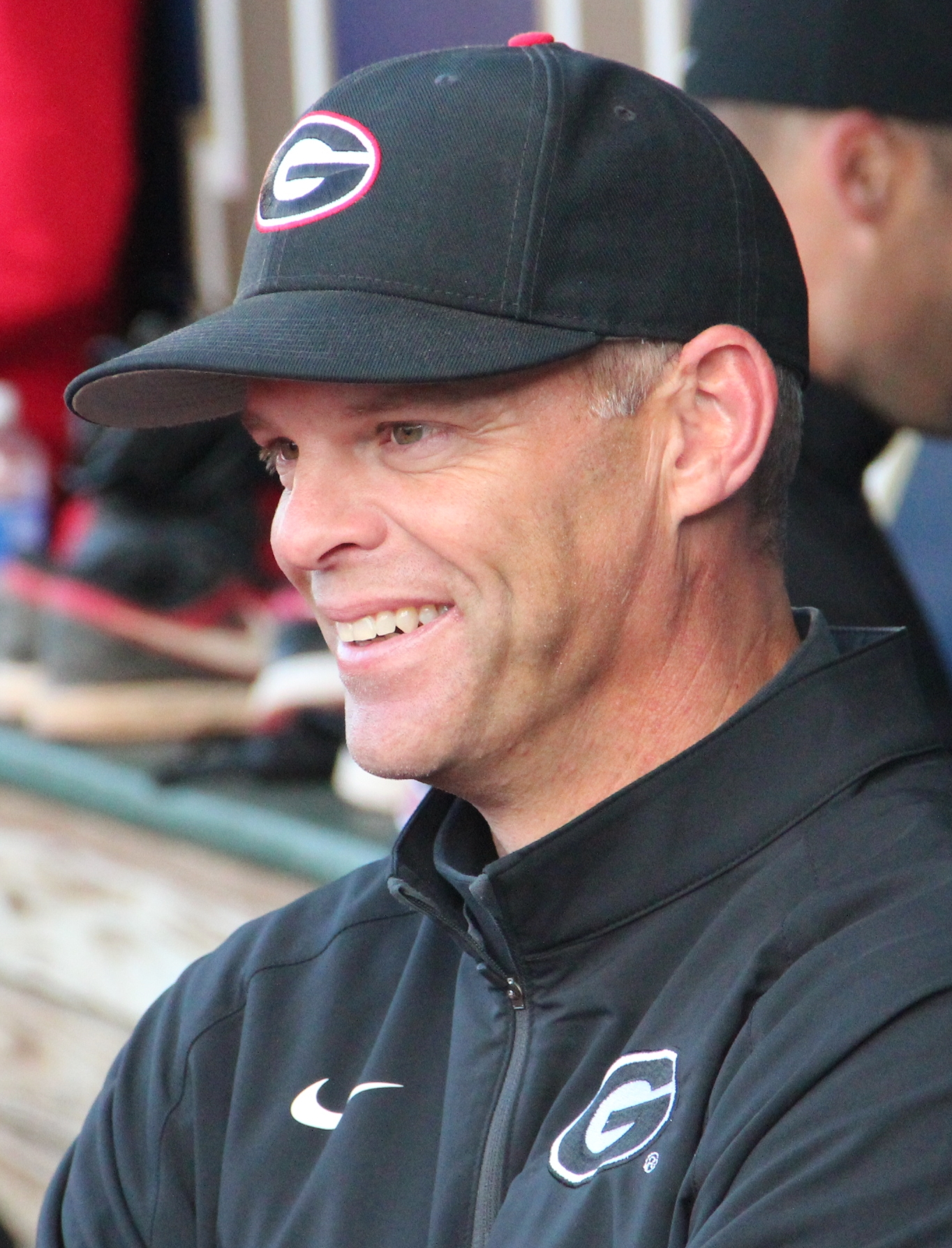
After retiring as a player, catcher Scott Stricklin of the 1994 Xpress began coaching college baseball in 1998.

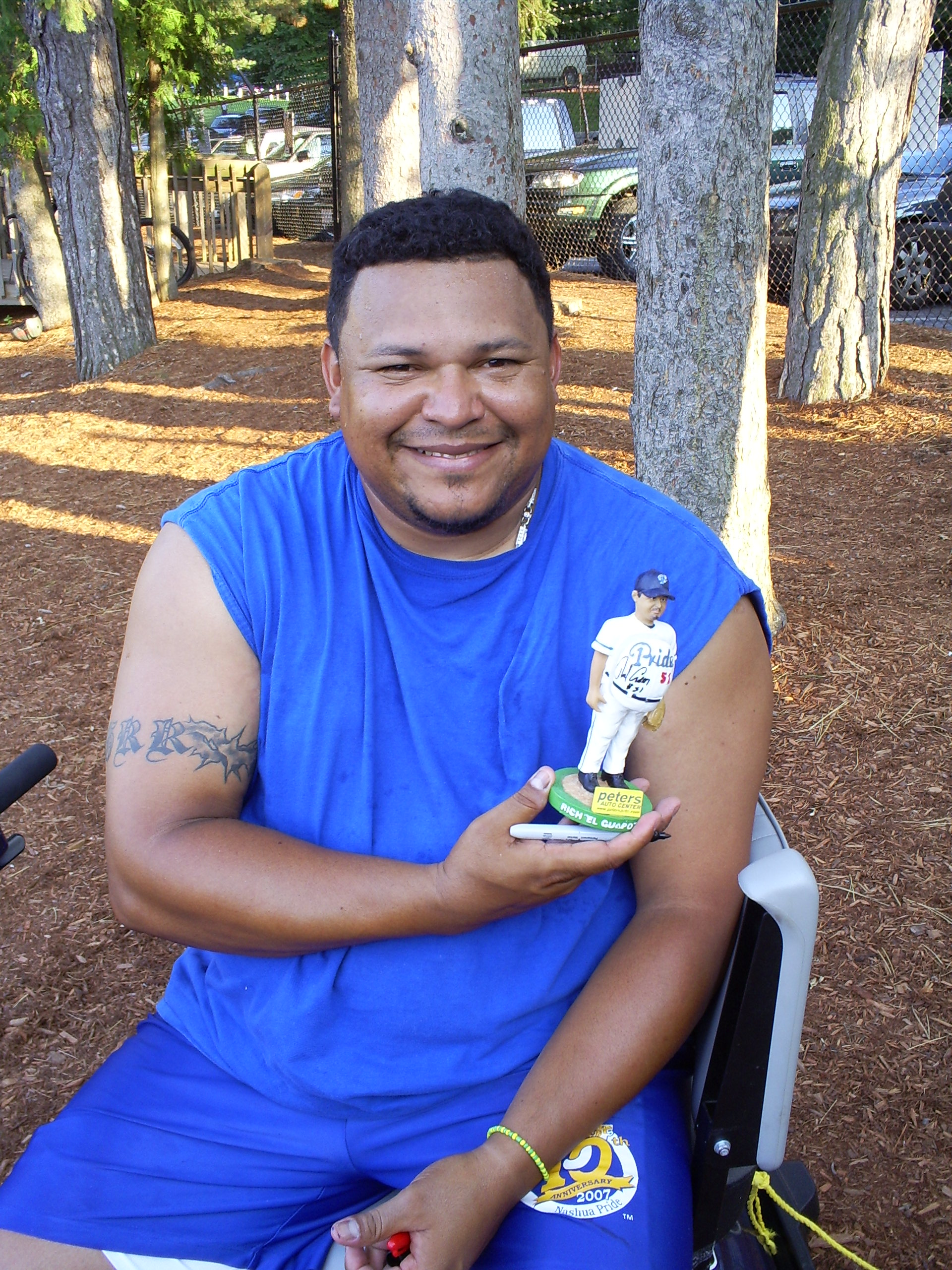
Rich Garcés led the 1994 Xpress pitching staff with a 1.000 fielding percentage in 40 appearances.

Name	Season(s)	Position(s)	Notes	MLB	Ref.
Marc Barcelo	1993–1994	Pitcher	12–6 record; 2.72 earned run average; 158 strikeouts	No	
Rich Becker	1993	Outfielder	.287 batting average; 15 home runs; 66 runs batted in	Yes	
Jayson Best	1993	Pitcher	1–0 record; 11.81 earned run average; 7 strikeouts	No	
Anthony Byrd	1994	Outfielder	.236 batting average; 7 home runs; 38 runs batted in	No	
Scott Cepicky	1994	First baseman/designated hitter	.225 batting average; 8 home runs; 32 runs batted in	No	
Ted Corbin	1993–1994	Shortstop	.222 batting average; 2 doubles; 14 runs batted in	No	
Marty Cordova^{†} (Note: Marty Cordova: American League Rookie of the Year (1995))	1993	Outfielder	.250 batting average; 19 home runs; 77 runs batted in	Yes	
Mike Daniel	1994	Catcher	.236 batting average; 6 home runs; 16 runs batted in	No	
Adell Davenport	1994	First baseman/third baseman	.236 batting average; 20 home runs; 71 runs batted in	No	
Javy DeJesus	1994	Pitcher	0.00 earned run average; 2 innings pitched; 2 strikeouts	No	
Rex De La Nuez	1993	Outfielder	.236 batting average; 8 home runs; 43 runs batted in	No	
Andres Duncan	1994	Shortstop	.254 batting average; 9 home runs; 46 runs batted in	No	
Steve Dunn	1993	First baseman	.262 batting average; 14 home runs; 60 runs batted in	Yes	
Mike Durant	1993	Catcher	.243 batting average; 8 home runs; 57 runs batted in	Yes	
Mike Fernandez	1994	Third baseman	.000 batting average; 1 strikeout; 4 plate appearances	No	
Gus Gandarillas	1994	Pitcher	2–2 record; 3.16 earned run average; 29 strikeouts	Yes	
Rich Garcés	1994	Pitcher	4–5 record; 3.72 earned run average; 76 strikeouts	Yes	
Sean Gavaghan	1993–1994	Pitcher	9–5 record; 1.78 earned run average; 93 strikeouts	No	
Ed Gerald	1994	Outfielder	.272 batting average; 13 home runs; 52 runs batted in	No	
Pedro Grifol	1993–1994	Catcher	.187 batting average; 6 home runs; 33 runs batted in	No	
Eddie Guardado^{†} (Note: Eddie Guardado: American League All-Star (2002 & 2003))	1993	Pitcher	4–0 record; 1.24 earned run average; 57 strikeouts	Yes	
LaTroy Hawkins	1994	Pitcher	9–2 record; 2.33 earned run average; 53 strikeouts	Yes	
Steve Hazlett	1994	Outfielder	.293 batting average; 14 home runs; 54 runs batted in	No	
Jon Henry	1993–1994	Pitcher	12–3 record; 2.87 earned run average; 66 strikeouts	No	
Denny Hocking	1993	Shortstop	.267 batting average; 8 home runs; 50 runs batted in	Yes	
Tom Houk	1993	Third baseman	.229 batting average; 2 home runs; 29 runs batted in	No	
Greg Johnson	1993	Pitcher	3–1 record; 2.80 earned run average; 54 strikeouts	No	
Jason Klonoski	1993	Pitcher	4–6 record; 3.16 earned run average; 56 strikeouts	No	
Dom Konieczki	1993	Pitcher	2–6 record; 6.66 earned run average; 39 strikeouts	No	
Andrew Kontorinis	1994	First baseman	.161 batting average; 1 home run; 2 runs batted in	No	
Jeff Mansur	1993–1994	Pitcher	11–17 record; 5.01 earned run average; 111 strikeouts	No	
Dan Masteller	1993	First baseman/outfielder	.273 batting average; 3 home runs; 16 runs batted in	Yes	
Bob McCreary	1993	Pitcher	3–8 record; 5.31 earned run average; 42 strikeouts	No	
Mike McDonald	1993	Outfielder	.257 batting average; 7 home runs; 31 runs batted in	No	
Damian Miller^{†} (Note: Damian Miller: National League All-Star (2002))	1993–1994	Catcher	.269 batting average; 8 home runs; 35 runs batted in	Yes	
Travis Miller	1994	Pitcher	0–0 record; 2.84 earned run average; 4 strikeouts	Yes	
Mike Misuraca	1993–1994	Pitcher	14–10 record; 3.74 earned run average; 160 strikeouts	Yes	
Tim Moore	1994	Outfielder	.248 batting average; 18 home runs; 67 runs batted in	No	
William Mota	1993	First baseman	.234 batting average; 2 home runs; 26 runs batted in	No	
Scott Moten	1994	Pitcher	0–1 record; 3.86 earned run average; 4 strikeouts	No	
Oscar Múñoz	1993–1994	Pitcher	14–4 record; 2.70 earned run average; 160 strikeouts	Yes	
Dan Naulty	1994	Pitcher	0–7 record; 5.89 earned run average; 29 strikeouts	Yes	
Alan Newman	1993	Pitcher	1–6 record; 6.03 earned run average; 35 strikeouts	Yes	
Joe Norris	1994	Pitcher	6–8 record; 4.22 earned run average; 83 strikeouts	No	
Brian Raabe	1993	Second baseman/third baseman	.286 batting average; 6 home runs; 52 runs batted in	Yes	
Brad Radke^{†} (Note: Brad Radke: American League All-Star (1998))	1993–1994	Pitcher	14–15 record; 3.23 earned run average; 199 strikeouts	Yes	
Todd Ritchie	1993–1994	Pitcher	3–4 record; 3.84 earned run average; 50 strikeouts	Yes	
David Rivera	1993	Second baseman	.237 batting average; 3 home runs; 33 runs batted in	No	
Brett Roberts	1994	Pitcher	2–1 record; 6.75 earned run average; 11 strikeouts	No	
Bob Robinson	1993	Pitcher	2–4 record; 5.16 earned run average; 26 strikeouts	No	
Paul Russo	1994	Third baseman	.227 batting average; 10 home runs; 40 runs batted in	No	
Erik Schullstrom	1993–1994	Pitcher	2–2 record; 3.17 earned run average; 54 strikeouts	Yes	
Mitch Simons	1994	Second baseman	.317 batting average; 3 home runs; 48 runs batted in	No	
Scott Stahoviak	1993	Third baseman	.272 batting average; 12 home runs; 56 runs batted in	Yes	
Scott Stricklin	1994	Catcher	.237 batting average; 4 doubles; 1 run batted in	No	
Dennis Sweeney	1994	Pitcher	1–2 record; 7.09 earned run average; 25 strikeouts	No	
Kenneth Tirpack	1994	First baseman/designated hitter	.220 batting average; 1 home runs; 13 runs batted in	No	
Ricky Ward	1994	Second baseman	.187 batting average; 6 home runs; 20 runs batted in	No	
Scott Watkins	1993–1994	Pitcher	1–1 record; 5.51 earned run average; 28 strikeouts	Yes	
Bill Wissler	1993	Pitcher	10–10 record; 3.95 earned run average; 115 strikeouts	No	

== Notes ==
Table keys

MLB award winners and All-Stars
