= 1995 Minnesota Twins season =

1995 Minnesota Twins
- League: American League
- Division: Central
- Ballpark: Hubert H. Humphrey Metrodome
- City: Minneapolis
- Record: 56-88 (.389)
- Divisional place: 5th
- Owners: Carl Pohlad
- General managers: Terry Ryan
- Managers: Tom Kelly
- Television: WCCO-TV; KLGT-TV; Midwest Sports Channel (Bert Blyleven, Dick Bremer, Gene Larkin, Chad Hartman, Tommy John, Kent Hrbek )
- Radio: 830 WCCO AM (Herb Carneal, John Gordon)

The 1995 Minnesota Twins season was the 35th season for the Minnesota Twins franchise in the Twin Cities of Minnesota, their 14th season at Hubert H. Humphrey Metrodome and the 95th overall in the American League.

Due to the 1994–95 Major League Baseball strike, the season got off to a late start. However, it did not end soon enough, as the team finished with a 56–88 record and in last place in its division. The team found it impossible to compete against the runaway Cleveland Indians who won 100 games despite the shortened season and finished 44 games ahead of the Twins. By July, the team was trading away its veterans in a fire sale. Manager Tom Kelly might have preferred that the strike had continued.

== Offseason ==
- November 4, 1995: Rich Robertson was selected off waivers by the Twins from the Pittsburgh Pirates.
- December 16, 1995: Matt Merullo was signed as a free agent by the Twins.
- December 22, 1995: Kevin Maas was signed as a free agent by the Twins.

== Regular season ==
- On May 7, the Twins played their longest game ever—in terms of time—losing in 17 innings to Cleveland after 6 hours and 36 minutes.
- May 17 – Kirby Puckett scores his 1000th run, at the Metrodome.
- May 26 – Kirby Puckett gets his 1000th RBI, at the Metrodome.
- The lone representative of the Twins in the All-Star Game was outfielder Kirby Puckett.
- On September 13, three Seattle pitchers struck out eighteen Twins, which set a team record for batting futility.
- The highest paid Twin in 1995 was Kirby Puckett at $6,300,000, followed by Rick Aguilera at $4,3500,000.

=== Offense ===
The performance of three players were praised: second baseman Chuck Knoblauch, and outfielders Kirby Puckett and Marty Cordova. In the last year of his career, Puckett would be the team's lone all-star representative. Knoblauch won his first Silver Slugger Award, while Cordova won the Rookie of the Year award.

Team Leaders
Statistic	Player	Quantity
HR	Marty Cordova	24
RBI	Kirby Puckett	99
BA	Chuck Knoblauch	.333
Runs	Chuck Knoblauch	107

=== Pitching ===
The starting rotation was uncertain. Surprisingly, the only certainty was that rookie Brad Radke would get the ball every fifth game. He made 28 starts, but the other pitchers were either injury-prone, inconsistent, or traded by the end of the year, with Kevin Tapani making 20 starts, Mike Trombley 18, Frank Rodriguez 16, Scott Erickson 15, and Jose Parra 12. Closer Rick Aguilera would also be traded midway through the season. He earned 12 saves while Dave Stevens earned 10. Aguilera, Rich Robertson, and Mark Guthrie were the only regular pitchers with ERAs under 5.

Team Leaders
Statistic	Player	Quantity
ERA	Kevin Tapani	4.92
Wins	Brad Radke	11
Saves	Rick Aguilera	12
Strikeouts	Kevin Tapani	88

=== Defense ===
Like most of Tom Kelly's teams, the defense was capable. Matt Walbeck was the starting catcher, backed up by Matt Merullo. Scott Stahoviak played in 69 games at first base. Although he was not a good hitter, he had a .998 fielding percentage that year. Knoblauch capably manned second base. Scott Leius played reasonably well at third in his last year with the Twins. Pat Meares continued his decent play at shortstop in his third year with the Twins. The regular outfielders were Puckett, Cordova, and Rich Becker.

=== Notable Transactions ===
- April 6, 1995: Carl Willis was signed as a free agent by the Twins.
- May 4, 1995: Carl Willis was released by the Twins.
- May 16, 1995: Kevin Campbell was released by the Twins.
- June 1, 1995: 1995 Major League Baseball draft
  - Mark Redman was drafted by the Twins in the 1st round (13th pick).
  - Doug Mientkiewicz was drafted by the Twins in the 5th round.
- July 6, 1995: Rick Aguilera was traded by the Twins to the Boston Red Sox for pitcher Frank Rodriguez and a player to be named later. The Red Sox completed the deal by sending J. J. Johnson (minors) to the Twins on October 11.
- July 7, 1995: Scott Erickson was traded by the Twins to the Baltimore Orioles for pitcher Scott Klingenbeck and a player to be named later. The Orioles completed the trade by sending Kimera Bartee to the Twins on September 19.
- July 31, 1995: Kevin Tapani and Mark Guthrie were traded by the Twins to the Los Angeles Dodgers for Ron Coomer, Greg Hansell, José Parra, and a player to be named later. The Dodgers completed the deal by sending Chris Latham to the Twins on October 30.
- October 9, 1995: Luis Rivas was signed by the Minnesota Twins as an amateur free agent.

=== Season standings ===
AL Central
Team	W	L	Pct.	GB	Home	Road
Cleveland Indians	100	44	.694	—	54‍–‍18	46‍–‍26
Kansas City Royals	70	74	.486	30	35‍–‍37	35‍–‍37
Chicago White Sox	68	76	.472	32	38‍–‍34	30‍–‍42
Milwaukee Brewers	65	79	.451	35	33‍–‍39	32‍–‍40
Minnesota Twins	56	88	.389	44	29‍–‍43	27‍–‍45

=== Record vs. opponents ===
1995 American League record Source: MLB Standings Grid – 1995
Team	BAL	BOS	CAL	CWS	CLE	DET	KC	MIL	MIN	NYY	OAK	SEA	TEX	TOR
Baltimore	—	4–9	9–4	6–1	2–10	8–5	4–5	7–5	3–6	6–7	5–7	6–7	4–1	7–6
Boston	9–4	—	11–3	5–3	6–7	8–5	3–2	8–4	5–4	5–8	8–4	7–5	3–4	8–5
California	4–9	3–11	—	10–2	3–2	6–2	5–7	5–2	8–5	7–5	6–7	7–6	6–7	8–2
Chicago	1–6	3–5	2–10	—	5–8	8–4	8–5	6–7	10–3	3–2–1	7–5	4–9	5–7	6–5
Cleveland	10–2	7–6	2–3	8–5	—	10–3	11–1	9–4	9–4	6–6	7–0	5–4	6–3	10–3
Detroit	5–8	5–8	2–6	4–8	3–10	—	3–4	8–5	7–5	5–8	2–3	5–5	4–8	7–6
Kansas City	5–4	2–3	7–5	5–8	1–11	4–3	—	10–2	6–7	3–7	5–8	7–5	8–6	7–5
Milwaukee	5–7	4–8	2–5	7–6	4–9	5–8	2–10	—	9–4	5–6	7–2	3–2	5–7	7–5
Minnesota	6–3	4–5	5–8	3–10	4–9	5–7	7–6	4–9	—	3–4	5–7	4–8	5–8	1–4
New York	7–6	8–5	5–7	2–3–1	6–6	8–5	7–3	6–5	4–3	—	4–9	4–9	6–3	12–1
Oakland	7–5	4–8	7–6	5–7	0–7	3–2	8–5	2–7	7–5	9–4	—	7–6	5–8	3–7
Seattle	7–6	5–7	6–7	9–4	4–5	5–5	5–7	2–3	8–4	9–4	6–7	—	10–3	3–4
Texas	1–4	4–3	7–6	7–5	3–6	8–4	6–8	7–5	8–5	3–6	8–5	3–10	—	9–3
Toronto	6–7	5–8	2–8	5–6	3–10	6–7	5–7	5–7	4–1	1–12	7–3	4–3	3–9	—

=== Roster ===
1995 Minnesota Twins
Roster
Pitchers: 38 Rick Aguilera; 52 Kevin Campbell; 19 Scott Erickson; 18 Eddie Guardado; 53 Mark Guthrie; 23 Greg Harris; 32 LaTroy Hawkins; 57 Vince Horsman; 52 Scott Klingenbeck; 20 Pat Mahomes; 55 Oscar Múñoz; 56 José Parra; 59 Brad Radke; 47 Rich Robertson; 33 Frankie Rodriguez; 54 Mo Sanford; 58 Erik Schullstrom; 41 Dave Stevens; 36 Kevin Tapani; 21 Mike Trombley; 51 Scott Watkins; 51 Carl Willis	Catchers: 12 Matt Merullo; 9 Matt Walbeck; Infielders: 15 Ron Coomer; 39 Steve Dunn; 4 Chip Hale; 7 Denny Hocking; 11 Chuck Knoblauch; 31 Scott Leius; 24 Kevin Maas; 16 Dan Masteller; 8 Dave McCarty; 2 Pat Meares; 26 Brian Raabe; 17 Jeff Reboulet; 37 Scott Stahoviak	Outfielders: 25 Rich Becker; 44 Jerald Clark; 1 Alex Cole; 40 Marty Cordova; 50 Matt Lawton; 5 Pedro Muñoz; 34 Kirby Puckett; Other batters: 33 Bernardo Brito; 24 Riccardo Ingram	Manager: 10 Tom Kelly; Coaches: 46 Terry Crowley (hitting); 35 Ron Gardenhire (third base); 43 Rick Stelmaszek (bullpen); 42 Dick Such (pitching); 45 Scott Ullger

== Player stats ==
=== Batting ===
==== Starters by position ====
Note: G = Games played; AB = At bats; H = Hits; Avg. = Batting average; HR = Home runs; RBI = Runs batted in

Pos	Player	G	AB	H	Avg.	HR	RBI
C	Matt Walbeck	115	393	101	.257	1	44
1B	Scott Stahoviak	94	263	70	.266	3	23
2B	Chuck Knoblauch	136	538	179	.333	11	63
SS	Pat Meares	116	390	105	.269	12	49
3B	Scott Leius	117	372	92	.247	4	45
LF	Marty Cordova	137	512	142	.277	24	84
CF	Rich Becker	106	392	93	.237	2	33
RF	Kirby Puckett	137	538	169	.314	23	99
DH	Pedro Muñoz	104	376	113	.301	18	58

==== Other batters ====
Note: G = Games played; AB = At bats; H = Hits; Avg. = Batting average; HR = Home runs; RBI = Runs batted in

Player	G	AB	H	Avg.	HR	RBI
Jeff Reboulet	87	216	63	.292	4	23
Dan Masteller	71	198	47	.237	3	21
Matt Merullo	76	195	55	.282	1	27
Jerald Clark	36	109	37	.339	3	15
Chip Hale	69	103	27	.262	2	18
Ron Coomer	37	101	26	.257	5	19
Alex Cole	28	79	27	.342	1	14
Matt Lawton	21	60	19	.317	1	12
Kevin Maas	22	57	11	.193	1	5
Dave McCarty	25	55	12	.218	0	4
Denny Hocking	9	25	5	.200	0	3
Brian Raabe	6	14	3	.214	0	1
Riccardo Ingram	4	8	1	.125	0	1
Steve Dunn	5	6	0	.000	0	0
Bernardo Brito	5	5	1	.200	1	1

=== Pitching ===
==== Starting pitchers ====
Note: G = Games pitched; IP = Innings pitched; W = Wins; L = Losses; ERA = Earned run average; SO = Strikeouts

Player	G	IP	W	L	ERA	SO
Brad Radke	29	181.0	11	14	5.32	75
Kevin Tapani	20	133.2	6	11	4.92	88
Mike Trombley	20	97.2	4	8	5.62	68
Frank Rodriguez	16	90.1	5	6	5.38	45
Scott Erickson	15	87.2	4	6	5.95	45
José Parra	12	61.2	1	5	7.59	29
Greg W. Harris	7	32.2	0	5	8.82	21
LaTroy Hawkins	6	27.0	2	3	8.67	9

==== Other pitchers ====
Note: G = Games pitched; IP = Innings pitched; W = Wins; L = Losses; ERA = Earned run average; SO = Strikeouts

Player	G	IP	W	L	ERA	SO
Pat Mahomes	47	94.2	4	10	6.37	67
Rich Robertson	25	51.2	2	0	3.83	38
Scott Klingenbeck	18	48.1	0	2	8.57	27
Oscar Múñoz	10	35.1	2	1	5.60	25

==== Relief pitchers ====
Note: G = Games pitched; W = Wins; L = Losses; SV = Saves; ERA = Earned run average; SO = Strikeouts

Player	G	W	L	SV	ERA	SO
Dave Stevens	56	5	4	10	5.07	47
Eddie Guardado	51	4	9	2	5.12	71
Erik Schullstrom	37	0	0	0	6.89	21
Mark Guthrie	36	5	3	0	4.46	48
Scott Watkins	27	0	0	0	5.40	11
Rick Aguilera	22	1	1	12	2.52	29
Mo Sanford	11	0	0	0	5.30	17
Kevin Campbell	6	0	0	0	4.66	5
Vince Horsman	6	0	0	0	7.00	4
Carl Willis	3	0	0	0	94.50	0

== Other post-season awards ==
- Calvin R. Griffith Award (Most Valuable Twin) – Chuck Knoblauch
- Joseph W. Haynes Award (Twins Pitcher of the Year) – Brad Radke
- Bill Boni Award (Twins Outstanding Rookie) – Marty Cordova
- Charles O. Johnson Award (Most Improved Twin) – Pedro Muñoz
  - The above awards are voted on by the Twin Cities chapter of the BBWAA
- Carl R. Pohlad Award (Outstanding Community Service) – Kirby Puckett
- Sherry Robertson Award (Twins Outstanding Farm System Player) – Javier Valentín

== Farm system ==
Level	Team	League	Manager
AAA	Salt Lake Buzz	Pacific Coast League	Phil Roof
AA	Hardware City Rock Cats	Eastern League	Sal Butera
A	Fort Myers Miracle	Florida State League	Al Newman
A	Fort Wayne Wizards	Midwest League	Dan Rohn
Rookie	Elizabethton Twins	Appalachian League	John Russell
Rookie	GCL Twins	Gulf Coast League	Mike Boulanger
