= Nashville Xpress =

Former Minor League Baseball team in Nashville, Tennessee

- 1993–1994; Nashville, Tennessee
Team logo
Cap insignia

Minor league affiliations
- Class: Double-A (1993–1994)
- League: Southern League (1993–1994)

Major league affiliations
- Team: Minnesota Twins (1993–1994)

Minor league titles
- League titles (0): None
- First-half titles (1): 1993

Team data
- Name: Nashville Xpress (1993–1994)
- Colors: Navy, red, white, black, metallic silver
- Ballpark: Herschel Greer Stadium (1993–1994)

The Nashville Xpress were a Minor League Baseball team of the Southern League and the Double-A affiliate of the Minnesota Twins from 1993 to 1994. They were located in Nashville, Tennessee, and played their home games at Herschel Greer Stadium, sharing the ballpark with the Triple-A Nashville Sounds of the American Association. The Xpress were named for the trains which ran along tracks beyond the outfield wall and the team's sudden arrival and expected departure.

Formerly known as the Charlotte Knights, the Xpress were formed after the 1992 season when Charlotte, North Carolina, acquired a Triple-A expansion team in the International League, leaving the Southern League franchise in need of a new home. Larry Schmittou, president of the Triple-A Nashville club, offered to let the displaced team play at Greer Stadium until a permanent home could be found. Schmittou and the Sounds' staff served as caretakers of the team during the 1993 and 1994 seasons. Afterwards, the Xpress left Nashville to play on an interim basis in Wilmington, North Carolina, where they were known as the Port City Roosters in 1995 and 1996. The franchise eventually landed in Mobile, Alabama, as the Mobile BayBears in 1997. The team currently plays in Madison, Alabama, as the Rocket City Trash Pandas.

The Xpress were managed by Phil Roof in both the 1993 and 1994 seasons. A total of 60 players competed in at least one game for Nashville. The club played 282 regular season games and compiled a win–loss record of 146–136. Their only postseason appearance occurred in 1993 when they won the First Half Western Division title only to be swept 3–0 in the division finals.

== History ==
=== Arrival ===
In conjunction with the 1993 Major League Baseball expansion, George Shinn, owner of the Double-A Southern League's Charlotte Knights baseball team, was granted an expansion franchise in the Triple-A International League, which would begin playing in Charlotte, North Carolina, in 1993. Shinn, who had applied for Charlotte to receive one of two available Triple-A expansion teams, was recommended by the expansion committee after their visit to evaluate the city. Of the nine applicant cities, Charlotte had the newest stadium, the only major league sports franchise (the National Basketball Association's Charlotte Hornets), and the largest metro area population. Gaining a Triple-A team meant Shinn would need to relocate, or sell, his existing Southern League team as the higher classification team held the rights to the territory. He solicited offers to purchase the club to help defray a US$5 million International League enfranchisement cost. The interested parties included the Southern League, which hoped to place the team in an attractive market within its Southeastern territory, and the city of Jackson, Tennessee, which had been rejected from receiving a 1993 Double-A expansion franchise.

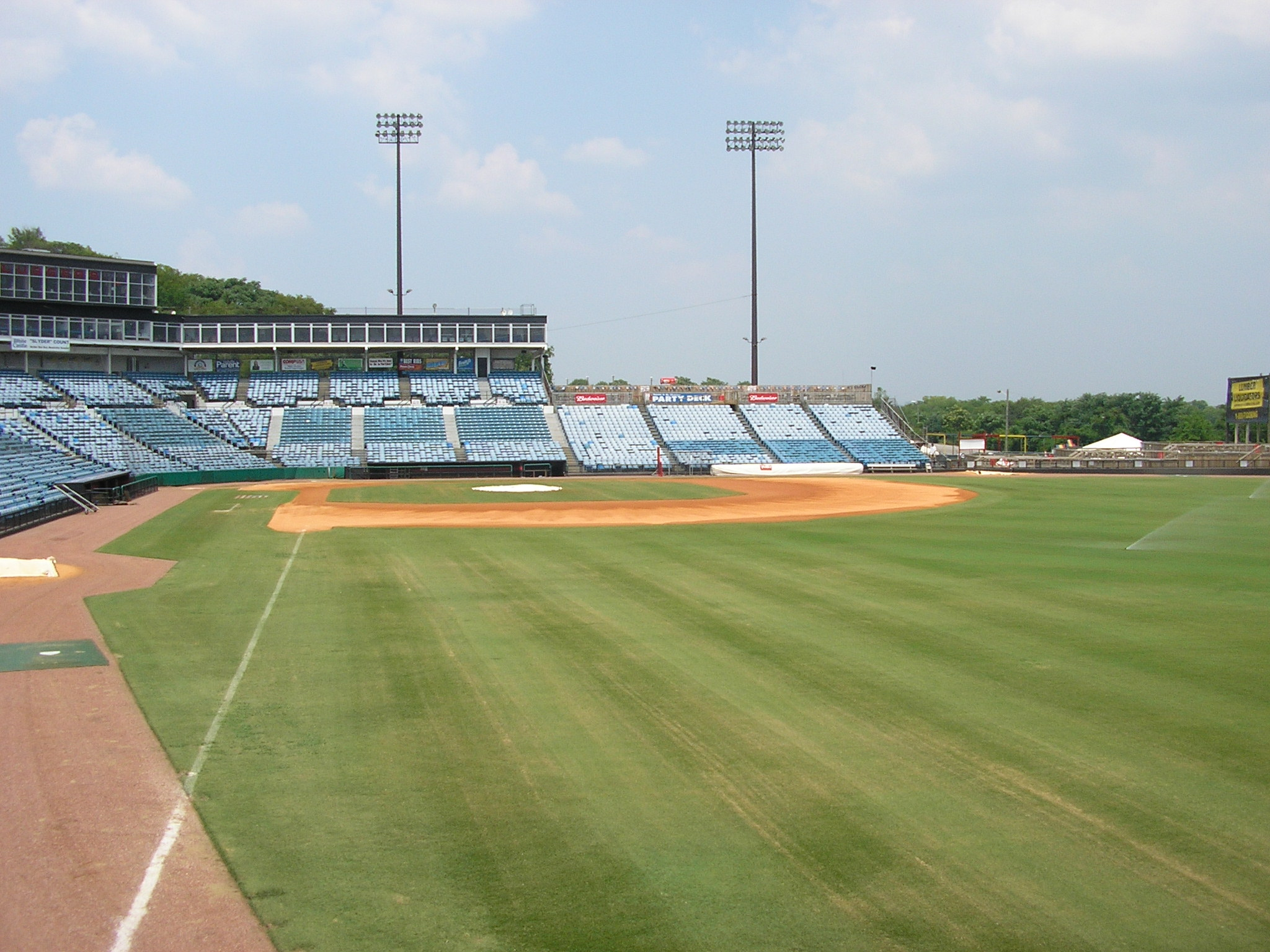
The Nashville Xpress played their home games at Herschel Greer Stadium.

In October 1992, Shinn chose to sell to Tom Benson, owner of the National Football League's New Orleans Saints, who sought to relocate the club to New Orleans. According to The Charlotte Observer, the asking price was $3.6 million, though the actual selling price was undisclosed. The move was blocked, however, when Minor League Baseball granted territorial rights to the higher-classification Triple-A Denver Zephyrs, who wanted to move to New Orleans after being uprooted by the Colorado Rockies National League expansion team. Following unsuccessful litigation and appeals, Benson opted out of the purchase and the franchise was still in need of a ballpark for the coming season. In late January 1993, less than three months away from Opening Day, Southern League owners met to explore all options and find a solution.

Southern League president Jim Bragan had approached Larry Schmittou, president and owner of several minor league teams, about placing the club at Ernie Shore Field in Winston-Salem, North Carolina, home of Schmittou's Class A-Advanced Winston-Salem Spirits. The ballpark's age and low seating capacity did not meet the requirements for a Double-A facility, so Schmittou offered Herschel Greer Stadium in Nashville, Tennessee, home of the Triple-A Nashville Sounds, as a temporary ballpark for the displaced team until Shinn could find a permanent location. In the end, the owners decided to accept the offer and place the team in Nashville for one season. Schmittou and Shinn entered into a management agreement wherein Schmittou and the Sounds' staff would operate the club and Shinn would retain ownership.

With the league's approval, the franchise relocated to Nashville. The Triple-A Charlotte Knights carried on the history and identity of the Double-A team that preceded it, and the Nashville Xpress were established as an entirely new team. Nashville's nickname was in dual reference to the freight trains which ran along tracks beyond Greer Stadium's outfield wall and the team's sudden arrival and expected departure after the season. Their logo depicted a steaming locomotive barreling across a baseball with "Nashville" written above in red and "Xpress" below in navy blue. To accommodate two teams at Greer, the Xpress' 71 home games, consisting of 68 dates with three doubleheaders, were scheduled for during the Sounds' road trips, and the team went on the road when the Sounds played at home. The arrangement meant that Greer would host baseball games for all but 11 days between the Sounds' April 8 opener and the Xpress' September 5 finale.

=== 1993 season ===
The Xpress became the Double-A affiliate of the Minnesota Twins after prospective owner Tom Benson signed a player development contract—a working agreement between major and minor league clubs—when still planning to buy and relocate the franchise. Nashville was managed by former major leaguer Phil Roof. The coaching staff was rounded out by pitching coach Rick Anderson and hitting coach Mark Funderburk, both of whom also had major league playing experience, and athletic trainer Rick McWane.

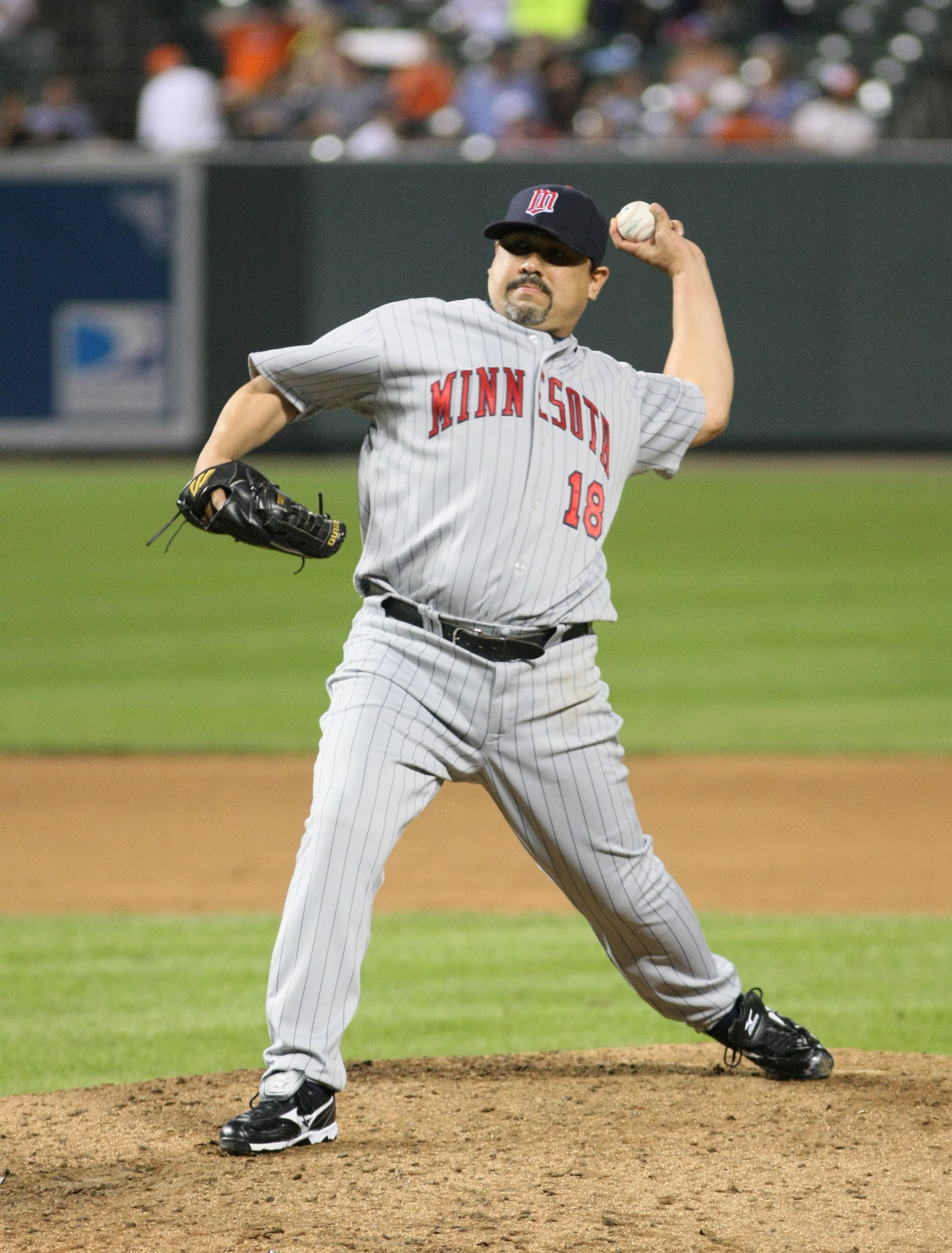
Eddie Guardado, was the starting pitcher in Nashville's first win on April 9, 1993.

The Xpress played their first game on April 8, 1993, against the Orlando Cubs at Tinker Field in Orlando, Florida. Nashville's Rich Becker started the game by reaching base on an error and then scoring a run on Scott Stahoviak's RBI ground out in the top of the first inning. The 1–0 lead was short lived as Orlando hit two two-run home runs off of Bill Wissler in the bottom of the first. Both teams scored again, but the Cubs' four first-inning runs were enough to defeat the Xpress, 5–3. Nashville got its first win the next night as they defeated the Cubs 5–3 with help from starting pitcher Eddie Guardado, who pitched six shutout innings, and Steve Dunn, who scored the winning run on an eighth-inning three-run homer. Their home opener at Greer was played on April 16 against Orlando. Pitchers Todd Ritchie, Mike Misuraca, and Jason Klonoski limited Cubs batters to five hits and no runs in the 4–0 shutout. Nashville scored the winning run in the second inning when Brian Raabe doubled bringing home David Rivera and Rich Becker. The game was attended by 1,715 people on a cold night.

The Southern League's 142-game season was split into two halves wherein the division winners from each half qualified for the postseason championship playoffs. Nashville managed to hold off the other four teams in the Western Division to win the first half title with a league-best 40–31 record. In recognition of their first-half performances, pitcher Oscar Múñoz and outfielder Rich Becker were selected for the 1993 Double-A All-Star Game. Múñoz, who did not play in the game after having pitched six innings the night before, led the Southern League with 11 wins and 118 strikeouts, while Becker possessed a .280 batting average with 10 home runs and 42 runs batted in (RBI); he struck out in his only at bat off the bench.

The Xpress lost three members of their starting rotation when Eddie Guardado was called up to make his major league debut with the Twins in late June, all-star pitcher Oscar Múñoz was moved up to the Twins' Triple-A Portland Beavers in August, and Todd Ritchie was unable to play for the rest of the season due to a shoulder injury. Despite winning the first-half, the Xpress struggled after the all-star break. They finished in fourth place with a 32–39 record, 11 games out of first.

Nashville faced the Birmingham Barons, winners of the Western Division's second half, in the best-of-five division championship series. In game one, held at Greer Stadium, the teams entered the fifth inning tied with two runs apiece, but Mike Robertson's grand slam put the Barons up 6–2. The Xpress answered with three runs in the sixth but left runners in scoring position in the sixth, seventh, and eighth innings on the way to a 7–5 loss. In the second game, the Xpress bullpen gave up nine runs in the eighth, blowing a 6–4 lead and resulting in a 13–6 loss. Game three of the series shifted to Birmingham, Alabama, where Nashville allowed nine runs in the sixth inning as the Barons erased what was a 3–1 Xpress lead. Birmingham won the game 10–3 and eliminated Nashville from the playoffs, ending their only postseason appearance in franchise history.

Combining both halves, the Xpress' composite record stood at 72–70 for the 1993 season. Oscar Múñoz was chosen to receive the Southern League Most Outstanding Pitcher Award after compiling an 11–4 record with a 3.08 earned run average (ERA) and 139 strikeouts in 131 2/3 innings pitched. Rich Becker, who co-led the league in runs scored (93), was named to the Southern League's postseason all-star team and was called up to Minnesota to make his major league debut after the playoffs ended. Marty Cordova tied for the league lead in extra-base hits (54), and pitcher Jeff Mansur tied for the most complete games (4). The team led the Southern League in stolen bases (164), walks (584), on-base percentage (.344), fewest walks issued (396), and fewest passed balls (9).

=== Changing owners ===
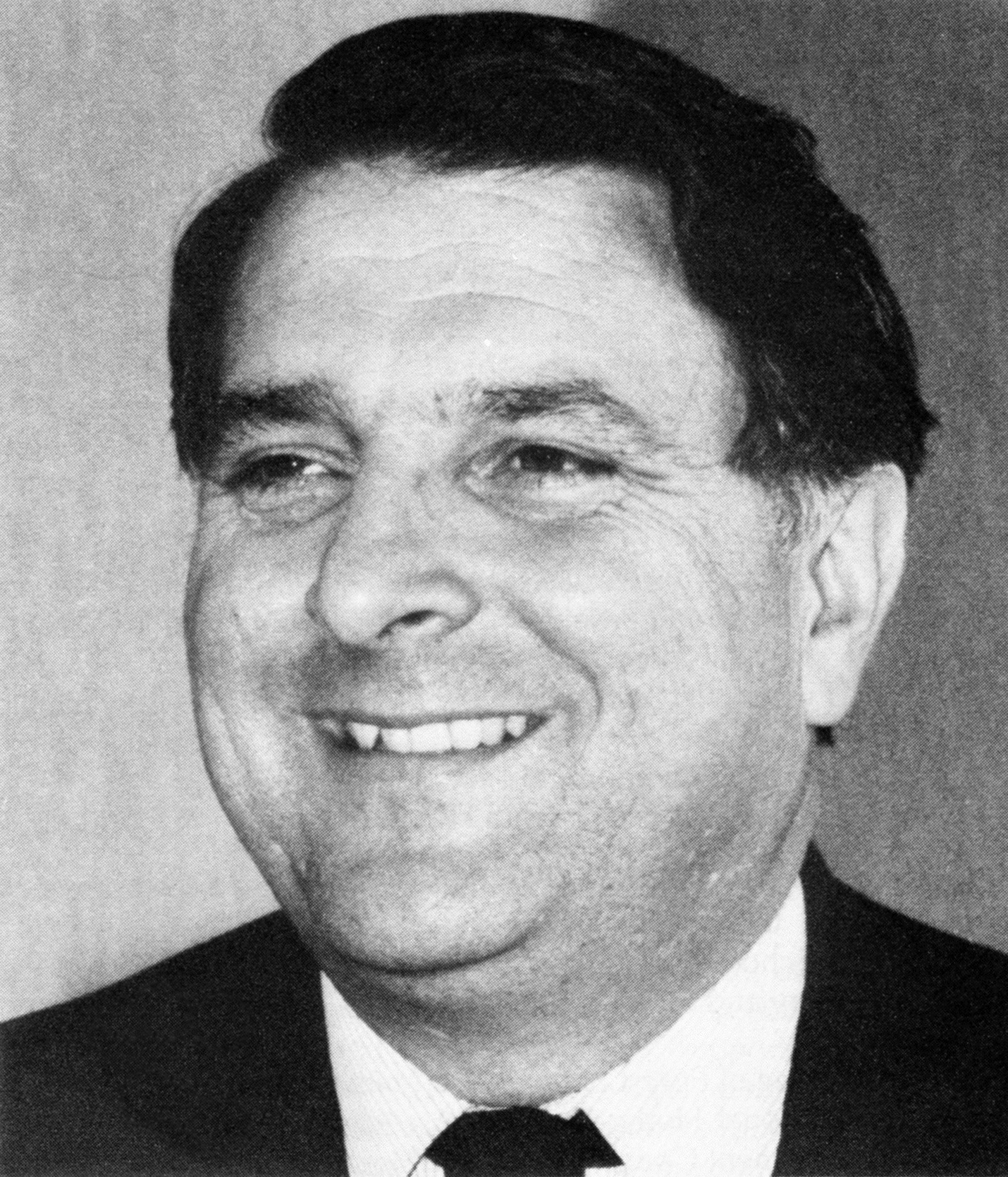
Larry Schmittou ran the Nashville Express simultaneous to the Nashville Sounds for two years.

George Shinn continued to look for a buyer for his Southern League franchise while Larry Schmittou continued to operate the team in Nashville. Dennis Bastien, owner and general manager of the Charleston Wheelers South Atlantic League team, offered to exchange his Class A Charleston franchise, all of its assets, and over $1 million for the Xpress. Becoming a three-party transaction, a group of Charleston-area investors agreed to then buy the Wheelers from Shinn so the city could keep its team. The arrangement was announced in October 1993, and Bastien closed on the acquisition of the Xpress in May 1994. The team had a new owner, but still lacked a city and stadium of its own. With the 1994 season soon to begin, Schmittou agreed to allow Bastien's franchise to remain at Greer for another year.

=== 1994 season ===
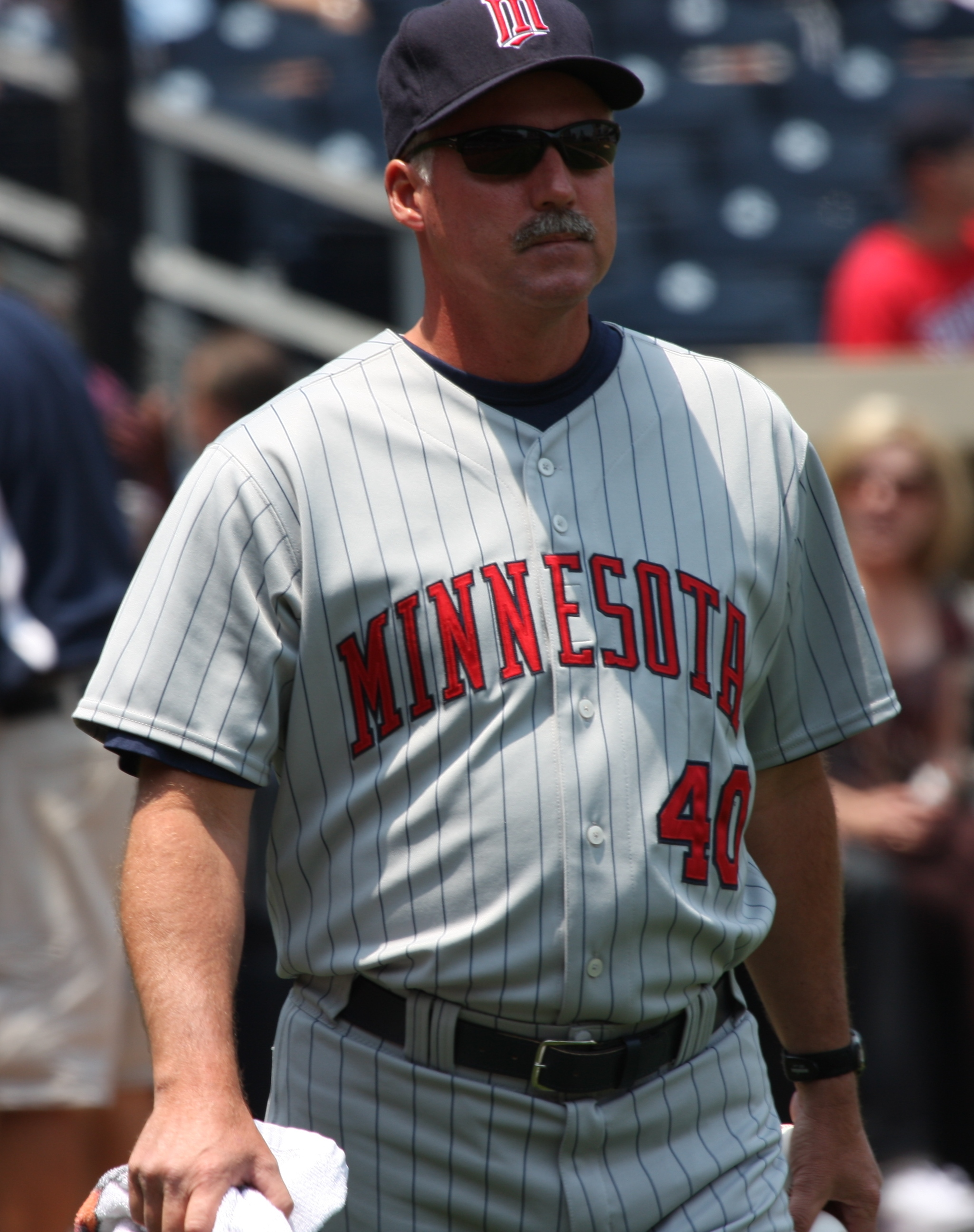
Rick Anderson coached the Xpress' pitchers to a league-leading 3.40 ERA and 917 strikeouts in 1994.

Phil Roof and the rest of the 1993 coaching staff returned to lead the team on the diamond in 1994. The Xpress began the season with an 11–3 loss to the Carolina Mudcats at Greer Stadium on April 7. They stayed in the running for the first-half title until the last three days of the half. Despite winning 27 of 40 games before being eliminated, Nashville fell four-and-a-half games short of first place with a 39–31 record, third best in the Western Division. Starting pitchers LaTroy Hawkins and Marc Barcelo were selected to participate in the Double-A All-Star Game. At the time, Hawkins held a 9–2 record with a 2.33 ERA. He missed the game after his promotion to Triple-A two weeks prior made him ineligible, as did Barcelo (9–2; 2.43 ERA) after pitching six innings the previous day.

Nashville jumped out to an early division lead but, much like the first half, were eliminated from second half title contention three games before the end of the season. In their final home game, played on September 1 against the Huntsville Stars, Nashville held a 1–0 lead going into the eighth inning, but Huntsville scored three runs in both the eighth and ninth innings on the way to a 6–2 defeat of the home team. Though the loss prevented them from clinching the division title, the Xpress were still in contention for a wild card playoff spot if they could finish in second place behind the first-half champion Stars with a pair of wins in their last two games. A 5–3 loss to the Chattanooga Lookouts at Engel Stadium on the next-to-last day of the season, however, ended their hopes of returning to the playoffs. The Xpress closed out their 1994 schedule on the road against Chattanooga on September 3; Nashville's batters were limited to just two hits in a 5–0 loss. They ended the second half in fourth-place at an even 35–35, four games out of first.

The Xpress recorded a 74–66 composite record in their final year in Nashville. Right-hander Brad Radke was named to the Southern League's 1994 postseason all-star squad. He and Barcelo were tied with another player for the Southern League lead in games started (28). LaTroy Hawkins tied for the league's best winning percentage (.818, 9–2). Nashville's pitching staff led the league in ERA (3.40) and strikeouts (917) while allowing the fewest stolen bases (105). After playing 282 regular season games and compiling an all-time record of 146–136, the franchise left Nashville.

=== Departure ===
Dennis Bastien intended to relocate his club to Lexington, Kentucky, in 1995, but those plans fell through when he was unable to broker a financial deal with the city to build a ballpark. In July 1994, the Southern League's board of directors stated that they wanted the team out of Nashville in 1995 and in a permanent location by 1996. Schmittou was unwilling to have the team back for another season as hosting the team at Greer was too big of a financial risk.

Rather than choose a city within the league's Southeastern footprint, Bastien proposed a temporary move to Bayamón, Puerto Rico. The Xpress would play at Juan Ramón Loubriel Stadium and be managed by the ownership group of the Memphis Chicks. The plan's chief problems involved the high travel costs to be incurred by flights to and from Puerto Rico and how to schedule the season so as to lessen those costs. Furthermore, the Minnesota Twins began looking for a new Double-A affiliate when they learned of the move, leaving the Xpress in need of a new major league affiliate who would be willing to send their players to Puerto Rico. The only major league clubs left without Double-A clubs were the Detroit Tigers and the Seattle Mariners. The Tigers elected to partner with the Trenton Thunder, leaving the Xpress to affiliate with the Mariners. Seattle, however, did not approve of their team playing in Puerto Rico, so the plan was scrapped.

In January 1995, Bastien arrived at terms to move the franchise to Springfield, Missouri, where they would play in a new stadium scheduled to open in 1997. In the intervening two seasons, the franchise played in Wilmington, North Carolina, at Brooks Field on the campus of the University of North Carolina Wilmington as the Port City Roosters. The Roosters were operated by Steve Bryant, owner of the Carolina Mudcats, similar to the manner in which Schmittou ran the Xpress.

The team never made it to Springfield after the city was unable to secure federal funding for a ballpark. Bastien made an attempt to place the team in the Springfield suburb of Ozark, but residents voted down a sales tax increase to pay for a stadium. He subsequently sold the franchise to sports investor Eric Margenau, who moved the team to Mobile, Alabama, where they began play at Hank Aaron Stadium as the Mobile BayBears in 1997. In 2018, the BayBears were sold to BallCorps, LLC. The team remained in Mobile for the 2019 season after which they were relocated to Madison, Alabama, a suburb of Huntsville, where they became known as the Rocket City Trash Pandas.

== Season-by-season results ==
The Xpress played 282 regular-season games over two seasons of competition and amassed a win–loss record of 146–136 (.518). They qualified for the postseason once, incurring a record of 0–3 (.000). Their best full-season record occurred in 1994 when they finished 74–66 (.529). Nashville's best half-season record occurred in the first half of the 1993 campaign when they won the First-Half Western Division title with a record of 40–31 (.563). Their lowest half-season record was 32–39 (.451) in the second half of the same year.

Full-season records
Season	Regular-season					Postseason			Ref.
Season	Record	Win %	League	Division	GB	Record	Win %	Result	Ref.
1993	72–70	.507	5th	3rd	6	0–3	.000	Won First-Half Western Division title Lost Western Division title vs. Birmingham Barons, 3–0	
1994	74–66	.529	4th (tie)	3rd	8	—	—	—	
Totals	146–136	.518	—	—	—	0–3	.000	—	—

Split-season records
Season	Half	Regular-season					Postseason			Ref.
Season	Half	Record	Win %	League	Division	GB	Record	Win %	Result	Ref.
1993	1st	40–31	.563	1st	1st	—	0–3	.000	Result	Won First-Half Western Division title Lost Western Division title vs. Birmingham Barons, 3–0
1993	2nd	32–39	.451	8th	4th	11	0–3	.000		Won First-Half Western Division title Lost Western Division title vs. Birmingham Barons, 3–0
1994	1st	39–31	.557	4th	3rd	4 1/2	—	—	—	
1994	2nd	35–35	.500	5th	4th	4	—	—	—	
Totals	—	146–136	.518	—	—	—	0–3	.000	—	—

== Ballpark ==
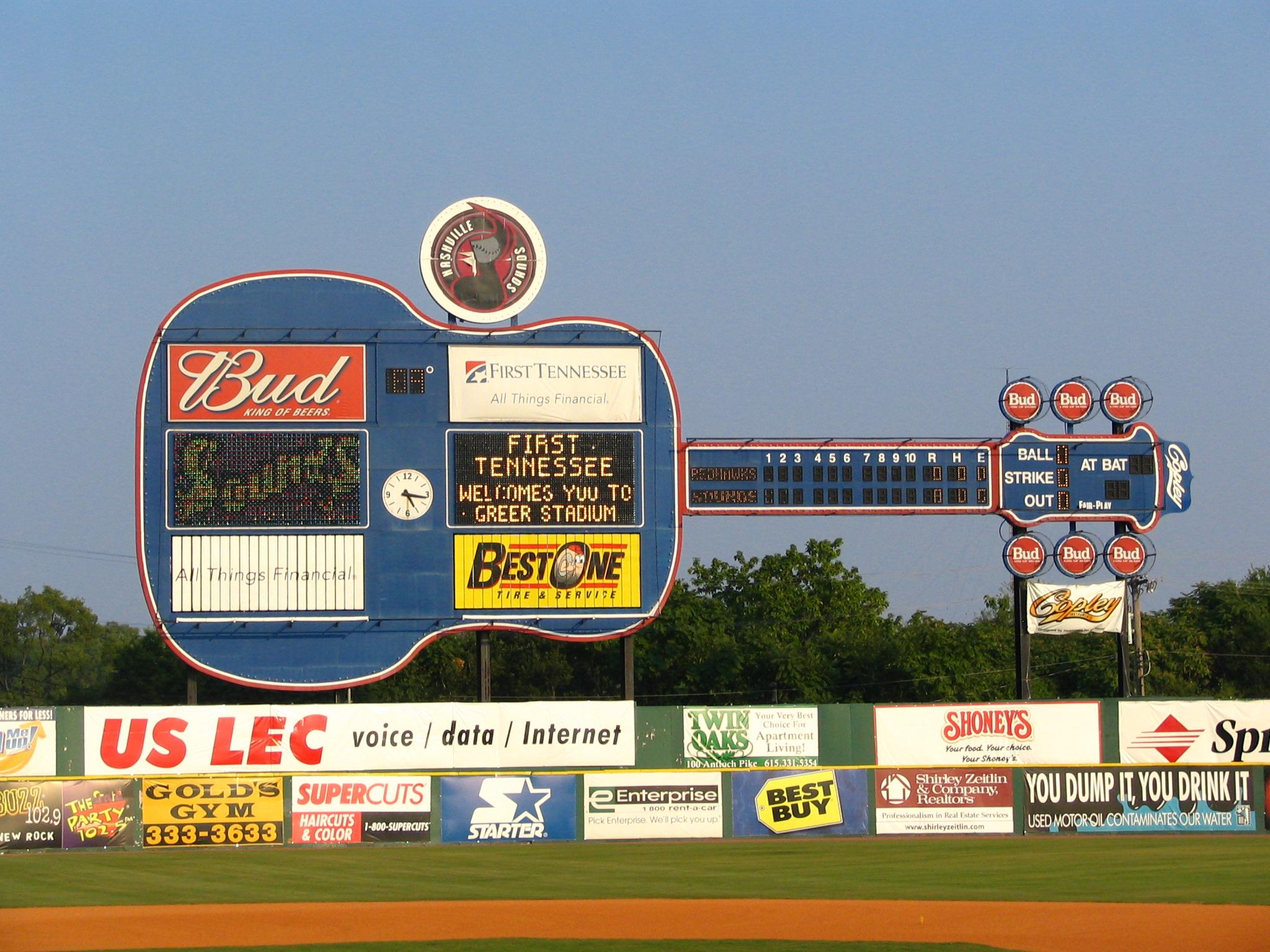
Greer Stadium's guitar scoreboard was installed for the 1993 season, the same year the Xpress came to Nashville.

The Nashville Xpress shared Herschel Greer Stadium with the Nashville Sounds. The ballpark, which was demolished in 2019, was located on the grounds of Fort Negley, an American Civil War fortification approximately two miles (3.2 km) south of downtown Nashville. The venue experienced numerous expansions and contractions after its completion in 1978, though it was at a capacity of 17,000 spectators during the Xpress' occupancy. Greer featured a 115.6 foot (35.2 m) guitar-shaped scoreboard behind the left field wall, which was installed prior to the 1993 season.

Hindered by competition with the Sounds, according to Schmittou, the Xpress did not generate much interest among fans in their two years at Greer. Attendance for the Xpress' 1993 schedule of 68 openings totaled 178,737 people, for an average of 2,628 per game. In comparison, the Sounds drew 438,745 people in 72 openings, for a per-game average of 6,094. Schmittou estimated he would need an additional 250,000 people to attend games at Greer to recoup the extra $400,000 budgeted for hosting a second team. With the Sounds drawing fewer attendees than in their 1992 season, the combined gain totaled only 127,491.

Attendance continued to be low in 1994, with the exception of seven games against the Birmingham Barons, who attracted fans across the Southern League wanting to see outfield prospect and NBA star Michael Jordan. In five games against Birmingham, 60,158 fans attended Xpress games, an average of 12,032 per game, while far fewer—sometimes fewer than 1,000—attended other Xpress games. The team's 1994 attendance totaled a league-low 135,048 people in 70 games, an average of 1,929 each. While the Sounds also experienced a drop in attendance, they still outdrew their Double-A stadium-mates with a total attendance of 300,821 fans across 72 openings, for an average of 4,178 per game.

== Uniforms ==
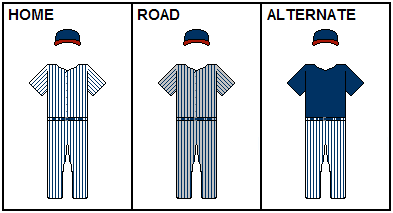
Nashville Xpress uniforms

Nashville's home jerseys were white with navy pinstripes. "Xpress" was written across the chest in red letters with a navy blue border. A patch of the team's primary logo was present on the left sleeve. The player's number was displayed on the back in red block characters bordered by navy. Pants were white with navy pinstripes and were paired with navy belts. Nashville's road uniforms were identical to those worn at home, except they were gray and lacked the sleeve logo patch. In 1994, a patch celebrating the 125th anniversary of Major League Baseball was sewn onto the right sleeve. Worn as an alternate or for batting practice, a navy pullover jersey made of mesh material with the primary logo on the left chest and numbers on the back in red with white borders was paired with either home or road pants as appropriate. All uniforms were worn with a navy cap with a red brim and button showing a white steam locomotive coming out from beneath a red "N" with a silver border, serving like a tunnel, on the front.

== Players ==
A total of 60 players competed in at least one game for the Xpress. The 1993 roster included a total of 35 players, while 38 played for the team in 1994. Thirteen players were members of the team in both seasons. Of the 60 all-time Xpress players, 22 also played in at least one game for a Major League Baseball team during their careers. These players were:

- Rich Becker
- Marty Cordova
- Steve Dunn
- Mike Durant
- Gus Gandarillas
- Rich Garcés
- Eddie Guardado
- LaTroy Hawkins
- Denny Hocking
- Dan Masteller
- Damian Miller
- Travis Miller
- Mike Misuraca
- Oscar Múñoz
- Dan Naulty
- Alan Newman
- Brian Raabe
- Brad Radke
- Todd Ritchie
- Erik Schullstrom
- Scott Stahoviak
- Scott Watkins

=== Achievements ===
These players won Southern League awards, were voted onto midseason All-Star teams, or were selected for postseason All-Star teams while members of the Xpress.

Award winners and All-Stars
Award	Recipient	Season	Ref.
Southern League Most Outstanding Pitcher	Oscar Múñoz	1993	
Double-A All-Star	Rich Becker	1993	
Double-A All-Star	Oscar Múñoz	1993	
Double-A All-Star	Marc Barcelo	1994	
Double-A All-Star	LaTroy Hawkins	1994	
Southern League Postseason All-Star	Rich Becker	1993	
Southern League Postseason All-Star	Brad Radke	1994	

=== Career records ===
These are records of players who led in distinct statistical categories during their career with the Xpress.

Career batting leaders
Statistic	Player	Record	Xpress career	Ref.
Games played	Rich Becker	138	1993	
Games played	Marty Cordova	138	1993	
At bats	Brian Raabe	524	1993	
Runs	Rich Becker	93	1993	
Hits	Brian Raabe	150	1993	
Doubles	Steve Hazlett	31	1994	
Triples	Rich Becker	7	1993	
Home runs	Adell Davenport	20	1994	
Runs batted in	Marty Cordova	77	1993	
Stolen bases	David Rivera	35	1993	
Walks	Rich Becker	94	1993	

Career pitching leaders
Statistic	Player	Record	Xpress career	Ref.
Wins	Oscar Múñoz	14	1993–94	
Wins	Mike Misuraca	14	1993–94	
Wins	Brad Radke	14	1993–94	
Losses	Jeff Mansur	17	1993–94	
Games pitched	Sean Gavaghan	76	1993–94	
Games started	Brad Radke	41	1993–94	
Saves	Sean Gavaghan	14	1993–94	
Innings pitched	Brad Radke	262 1/3	1993–94	
Runs allowed	Jeff Mansur	140	1993–94	
Home runs allowed	Jeff Mansur	32	1993–94	
Walks	Jeff Mansur	74	1993–94	
Strikeouts	Brad Radke	199	1993–94	
