= 1993 Minnesota Twins season =

1993 Minnesota Twins
- League: American League
- Division: West
- Ballpark: Hubert H. Humphrey Metrodome
- City: Minneapolis
- Record: 71–91 (.438)
- Divisional place: 6th
- Owners: Carl Pohlad
- General managers: Andy MacPhail
- Managers: Tom Kelly
- Television: WCCO-TV; Midwest Sports Channel (Jim Kaat, Dick Bremer)
- Radio: 830 WCCO AM (Herb Carneal, John Gordon, Jim Powell)

The 1993 Minnesota Twins season was the 33rd season for the Minnesota Twins franchise in the Twin Cities of Minnesota, their 12th season at Hubert H. Humphrey Metrodome and the 93rd overall in the American League.

The Twins finished with a 71–91 record, leaving the team tied for fifth place with the California Angels. Kirby Puckett won the All-Star MVP award on July 13 and St. Paul native Dave Winfield got his 3,000th hit over the course of the year.

== Offseason ==
- October 26, 1992: Mike Maksudian was selected off waivers by the Twins from the Toronto Blue Jays.
- December 4, 1992: Kirby Puckett, after testing the free agent waters, signed a 5-year $30 million contract to remain a Twin. His deal is the second largest total package in major league history, topped only by the $32.5 million 5-year deal signed by Cal Ripken Jr. with the Baltimore Orioles last August.
- December 5, 1992: David West was traded by the Twins to the Philadelphia Phillies for Mike Hartley.
- December 9, 1992: Jim Deshaies was signed as a free agent by the Twins.
- December 17, 1992: Dave Winfield was signed as a free agent by the Twins.
- January 8, 1993: Randy Bush was signed as a free agent by the Twins.

== Regular season ==
- At Oriole Park at Camden Yards, the Twins' All-Star representatives were outfielder Kirby Puckett and closer Rick Aguilera. Puckett was named the MVP following his 2-for-3 performance with a solo home run and a run-scoring double.
- On September 16, Dave Winfield collected his 3000th major league hit, a run-scoring 9th-inning single off Oakland's Dennis Eckersley. Winfield was the first to do so wearing a Twins uniform, and the first ever to do so indoors.
- The highest paid Twin in 1993 was Puckett at $5,300,000, followed by Hrbek at $3,100,000.

=== Offense ===
Not only did Winfield get his 3,000th hit, but he also got his 500th double and 450th homer. He had a serviceable year as the team's primary designated hitter, hitting .271 with 21 home runs and 76 RBI. Other offensive highlights included Kent Hrbek becoming the second Twin (along with Harmon Killebrew) to reach 1,000 RBI and Brian Harper becoming only the fourth catcher in the prior 40 years to hit .300 in three consecutive seasons. Chuck Knoblauch continued his solid leadoff hitting, batting .277 and stealing a team-leading 29 bases. The weaker spots in the regular lineup included Pedro Muñoz (.233 average).

Team Leaders
Statistic	Player	Quantity
HR	Kent Hrbek	25
RBI	Kirby Puckett	89
BA	Brian Harper	.304
Runs	Kirby Puckett	89

=== Pitching ===
The starting rotation was reasonably competent, with Kevin Tapani, Willie Banks, and Jim Deshaies having ERAs in the low fours. Unfortunately, Scott Erickson was not able to follow up his very successful first three years in the majors, posting an ERA of 5.19 and leading the majors in losses (19). The fifth spot in the rotation was uncertain, with Eddie Guardado making 16 starts and Mike Trombley 10.

There were strong pitchers in the bullpen, starting with closer Rick Aguilera. He had 34 saves, and was American League Pitcher of the Month for June. Also having strong years were Larry Casian with an ERA of 3.02, Mike Hartley (4.00), and Carl Willis (3.10). This was not so much the case for pitchers such as George Tsamis (6.19) and Brett Merriman (9.67).

Team Leaders
Statistic	Player	Quantity
ERA	Willie Banks	4.04
Wins	Kevin Tapani	12
Saves	Rick Aguilera	34
Strikeouts	Kevin Tapani	150

=== Defense ===
The team was strong defensively. Harper was a strong catcher, with a .988 fielding percentage. Hrbek was always strong at first base as well, making only five errors in 1993. Knoblauch was a good second baseman at this point in his career. Mike Pagliarulo played in about half the team's games at third, with reasonable competence. (Jeff Reboulet and Terry Jorgensen also saw time at the position.) The team intended Scott Leius to be the starting shortstop, but an early injury prevented this from occurring. It paved the way for Pat Meares to man the position for several years. He surprised the team by playing reasonably well during his rookie year. Puckett always excelled in center field, while Shane Mack and Munoz did okay on either side of him.

=== Season standings ===
AL West
Team	W	L	Pct.	GB	Home	Road
Chicago White Sox	94	68	.580	—	45‍–‍36	49‍–‍32
Texas Rangers	86	76	.531	8	50‍–‍31	36‍–‍45
Kansas City Royals	84	78	.519	10	43‍–‍38	41‍–‍40
Seattle Mariners	82	80	.506	12	46‍–‍35	36‍–‍45
California Angels	71	91	.438	23	44‍–‍37	27‍–‍54
Minnesota Twins	71	91	.438	23	36‍–‍45	35‍–‍46
Oakland Athletics	68	94	.420	26	38‍–‍43	30‍–‍51

=== Record vs. opponents ===
1993 American League record Source: MLB Standings Grid – 1993
Team	BAL	BOS	CAL	CWS	CLE	DET	KC	MIL	MIN	NYY	OAK	SEA	TEX	TOR
Baltimore	—	6–7	7–5	4–8	8–5	5–8	7–5	8–5	8–4	6–7	10–2	7–5	4–8	5–8
Boston	7–6	—	7–5	7–5	5–8	6–7	5–7	5–8	7–5	6–7	9–3	7–5	6–6	3–10
California	5–7	5–7	—	7–6	5–7	4–8	6–7	7–5	4–9	6–6	6–7	6–7	6–7	4–8
Chicago	8–4	5–7	6–7	—	9–3	7–5	6–7	9–3	10–3	4–8	7–6	9–4	8–5	6–6
Cleveland	5–8	8–5	7–5	3–9	—	6–7	7–5	8–5	4–8	6–7	8–4	3–9	7–5	4–9
Detroit	8–5	7–6	8–4	5–7	7–6	—	5–7	8–5	6–6	4–9	8–4	7–5	6–6	6–7
Kansas City	5–7	7–5	7–6	7–6	5–7	7–5	—	5–7	7–6	6–6	6–7	7–6	7–6	8–4
Milwaukee	5–8	8–5	5–7	3–9	5–8	5–8	7–5	—	7–5	4–9	7–5	4–8	4–8	5–8
Minnesota	4–8	5–7	9–4	3–10	8–4	6–6	6–7	5–7	—	4–8	8–5	4–9	7–6	2–10
New York	7–6	7–6	6–6	8–4	7–6	9–4	6–6	9–4	8–4	—	6–6	7–5	3–9	5–8
Oakland	2–10	3–9	7–6	6–7	4–8	4–8	7–6	5–7	5–8	6–6	—	9–4	5–8	5–7
Seattle	5–7	5–7	7–6	4–9	9–3	5–7	6–7	8–4	9–4	5–7	4–9	—	8–5	7–5
Texas	8–4	6–6	7–6	5–8	5–7	6–6	6–7	8–4	6–7	9–3	8–5	5–8	—	7–5
Toronto	8–5	10–3	8–4	6–6	9–4	7–6	4–8	8–5	10–2	8–5	7–5	5–7	5–7	—

=== Notable transactions ===
- June 3, 1993: 1993 Major League Baseball draft
  - Torii Hunter was drafted by the Twins in the 1st round (20th pick).
  - Jason Varitek was drafted by the Twins in the 1st round (21st pick), but did not sign.
  - Dan Perkins was drafted by the Twins in the 2nd round.
  - Javier Valentín was drafted by the Twins in the 3rd round.
- June 27, 1993: Randy Bush was released by the Twins.
- June 30, 1993: Alan Newman and minor leaguer Tom Hauk were traded to the Cincinnati Reds for Gary Scott.
- August 15, 1993: Mike Pagliarulo was traded by the Twins to the Baltimore Orioles for a player to be named later. On August 16, the Orioles sent Erik Schullstrom to the Twins to complete the trade.
- August 28, 1993: Jim Deshaies was traded by the Twins to the San Francisco Giants for Aaron Fultz, minor leaguer Andres Duncan, and a player to be named later. On September 1, the Giants sent Greg Brummett to the Twins to complete the trade.

=== Roster ===
1993 Minnesota Twins
Roster
Pitchers: 38 Rick Aguilera; 23 Willie Banks; 57 Greg Brummett; 48 Larry Casian; 44 Jim Deshaies; 19 Scott Erickson; 41 Rich Garces; 18 Eddie Guardado; 53 Mark Guthrie; 49 Mike Hartley; 20 Pat Mahomes; 47 Brett Merriman; 36 Kevin Tapani; 21 Mike Trombley; 22 George Tsamis; 51 Carl Willis	Catchers: 12 Brian Harper; 16 Derek Parks; 15 Lenny Webster; Infielders: 25 Randy Bush; 4 Chip Hale; 7 Denny Hocking; 14 Kent Hrbek; 27 Terry Jorgensen; 11 Chuck Knoblauch; 31 Scott Leius; 59 Mike Maksudian; 2 Pat Meares; 13 Mike Pagliarulo; 17 Jeff Reboulet; 37 Scott Stahoviak	Outfielders: 25 Rich Becker; 33 Bernardo Brito; 26 J. T. Bruett; 9 Gene Larkin; 52 Derek Lee; 24 Shane Mack; 8 David McCarty; 5 Pedro Muñoz; 34 Kirby Puckett; 32 Dave Winfield	Manager: 10 Tom Kelly; Coaches: 46 Terry Crowley (hitting); 35 Ron Gardenhire (third base); 43 Rick Stelmaszek (bullpen); 42 Dick Such (pitching); 45 Wayne Terwilliger (first base)

== Player stats ==
=== Batting ===
==== Starters by position ====
Note: Pos = Position; G = Games played; AB = At bats; H = Hits; Avg. = Batting average; HR = Home runs; RBI = Runs batted in

Pos	Player	G	AB	H	Avg.	HR	RBI
C	Brian Harper	147	530	161	.304	12	73
1B	Kent Hrbek	123	392	95	.242	25	83
2B	Chuck Knoblauch	153	602	167	.277	2	41
SS	Pat Meares	111	346	87	.251	0	33
3B	Mike Pagliarulo	83	253	74	.292	3	23
LF	Shane Mack	128	503	139	.276	10	61
CF	Kirby Puckett	156	622	184	.296	22	89
RF	Pedro Muñoz	104	326	76	.233	13	38
DH	Dave Winfield	143	547	148	.271	21	76

==== Other batters ====
Note: G = Games played; AB = At bats; H = Hits; Avg. = Batting average; HR = Home runs; RBI = Runs batted in

Player	G	AB	H	Avg.	HR	RBI
Dave McCarty	98	350	75	.214	2	21
Jeff Reboulet	109	240	62	.258	1	15
Chip Hale	69	186	62	.333	3	27
Terry Jorgensen	59	152	34	.224	1	12
Gene Larkin	56	144	38	.264	1	19
Lenny Webster	49	106	21	.198	1	8
Scott Stahoviak	20	57	11	.193	0	1
Bernardo Brito	27	54	13	.241	4	9
Randy Bush	35	45	7	.156	0	3
Denny Hocking	15	36	5	.139	0	0
Derek Lee	15	33	5	.152	0	4
J.T. Bruett	17	20	5	.250	0	1
Derek Parks	7	20	4	.200	0	1
Scott Leius	10	18	3	.167	0	2
Mike Maksudian	5	12	2	.167	0	2
Rich Becker	3	7	2	.286	0	0

=== Pitching ===
==== Starting pitchers ====
Note: G = Games pitched; IP = Innings pitched; W = Wins; L = Losses; ERA = Earned run average; SO = Strikeouts

Player	G	IP	W	L	ERA	SO
Kevin Tapani	36	225.2	12	15	4.43	150
Scott Erickson	34	218.2	8	19	5.19	116
Willie Banks	31	171.1	11	12	4.04	138
Jim Deshaies	27	167.1	11	13	4.41	80
Eddie Guardado	19	94.2	3	8	6.18	46
Greg Brummett	5	26.2	2	1	5.74	10

==== Other pitchers ====
Note: G = Games pitched; IP = Innings pitched; W = Wins; L = Losses; ERA = Earned run average; SO = Strikeouts

Player	G	IP	W	L	ERA	SO
Mike Trombley	44	114.1	6	6	4.88	85
Pat Mahomes	12	37.1	1	5	7.71	23

==== Relief pitchers ====
Note: G = Games pitched; W = Wins; L = Losses; SV = Saves; ERA = Earned run average; SO = Strikeouts

Player	G	W	L	SV	ERA	SO
Rick Aguilera	65	4	3	34	3.11	59
Larry Casian	54	5	3	1	3.02	31
Mike Hartley	53	1	2	1	4.00	57
Carl Willis	53	3	0	5	3.10	44
George Tsamis	41	1	2	1	6.19	30
Mark Guthrie	22	2	1	0	4.71	15
Brett Merriman	19	1	1	0	9.67	14
Rich Garcés	3	0	0	0	0.00	3

== Other post-season awards ==
- Calvin R. Griffith Award (Most Valuable Twin) – Brian Harper
- Joseph W. Haynes Award (Twins Pitcher of the Year) – Rick Aguilera
- Bill Boni Award (Twins Outstanding Rookie) – Pat Meares
- Charles O. Johnson Award (Most Improved Twin) – Larry Casian
- Dick Siebert Award (Upper Midwest Player of the Year) – Paul Molitor
  - The above awards are voted on by the Twin Cities chapter of the BBWAA
- Carl R. Pohlad Award (Outstanding Community Service) – Brian Harper
- Sherry Robertson Award (Twins Outstanding Farm System Player) – LaTroy Hawkins

Kirby Puckett won the Branch Rickey Award, given annually to an individual in Major League Baseball (MLB) in recognition of his exceptional community service. The award was inaugurated last year and was awarded to Toronto Blue Jay Dave Winfield. In 1998, Paul Molitor becomes the second Twin to win the award.

== Farm system ==
Level	Team	League	Manager
AAA	Portland Beavers	Pacific Coast League	Scott Ullger
AA	Nashville Xpress	Southern League	Phil Roof
A	Fort Myers Miracle	Florida State League	Steve Liddle
A	Fort Wayne Wizards	Midwest League	Jim Dwyer
Rookie	Elizabethton Twins	Appalachian League	Ray Smith
Rookie	GCL Twins	Gulf Coast League	Jose Marzan
