= 1998 Minnesota Twins season =

1998 Minnesota Twins
- League: American League
- Division: Central
- Ballpark: Hubert H. Humphrey Metrodome
- City: Minneapolis
- Record: 70–92 (.432)
- Divisional place: 4th
- Owners: Carl Pohlad
- General managers: Terry Ryan
- Managers: Tom Kelly
- Television: KMSP-TV; Midwest Sports Channel (Bert Blyleven, Dick Bremer, Ryan Lefebvre)
- Radio: 830 WCCO AM (Herb Carneal, John Gordon, Ryan Lefebvre)

The 1998 Minnesota Twins season was the 38th season for the Minnesota Twins franchise in the Twin Cities of Minnesota, their 17th season at Hubert H. Humphrey Metrodome and the 98th overall in the American League.

The team finished with a 70–92 record, with subpar batting and pitching. The season was not without its bright spots, as individual players had solid seasons and Hall of Fame designated hitter Paul Molitor announced his retirement at the end of the season. Tom Kelly's team had plenty of lowlights, most notably David Wells' perfect game against the team on May 17 at Yankee Stadium.

== Regular season ==
=== Offense ===
In 1998, Twins fans witnessed the emergence of Matt Lawton and Todd Walker as major league hitters. The team believed Walker would be able to fill the void left after the trade of Chuck Knoblauch, who had been traded to the New York Yankees on February 6. Fans also saw the merciful end to the Twins' Scott Stahoviak era. Otis Nixon had a surprising year for a 39-year-old, hitting .297 and stealing 37 bases (leading the team). Molitor's hitting continued its gradual decline from his stellar 1996 campaign, with his average down to .281 and RBIs down to 69. These numbers were still competent and he was able to retire while playing solid baseball.

Team Leaders
Statistic	Player	Quantity
HR	Matt Lawton	21
RBI	Matt Lawton	77
BA	Todd Walker	.316
Runs	Matt Lawton	91

=== Pitching ===
Bob Tewksbury was the opening day starter for the Twins, the last opening day starter not named Brad Radke until 2006. Tewksbury, Radke, LaTroy Hawkins, and rookie Eric Milton (acquired in the Knoblauch trade) were in the rotation for most of the year. Mike Morgan and Frank Rodriguez also started 17 and 11 games, respectively. While Morgan had an impressive year for a forty-year-old journeyman before being traded in August, Rodriguez's season was a major disappointment. In his last year for the Twins, Rodriguez went 4–6 with an ERA of 6.56. This could not have been what the team had in mind when it acquired him for Rick Aguilera in 1995.

Subsequent to that trade, the Twins reacquired Aguilera, and he served as the teams' closer in 1998, earning a respectable 38 saves. Also in the bullpen, Eddie Guardado, Mike Trombley, Héctor Carrasco, and Greg Swindell had competent seasons.

Team Leaders
Statistic	Player	Quantity
ERA	Brad Radke	4.30
Wins	Brad Radke	12
Saves	Rick Aguilera	38
Strikeouts	Brad Radke	146

=== Defense ===
In his penultimate year as a major league catcher, Minnesota native Terry Steinbach, then 36, had a mediocre season, with Javier Valentín as his backup. David Ortiz was projected as the starting first baseman, but was hampered by injuries. Orlando Merced, Molitor, and Stahoviak saw time at the position in Ortiz's absence. Walker played second, while Ron Coomer saw a majority of the time at third. Pat Meares was the starting shortstop, but was unceremoniously dumped by the team following the season. The outfield consisted of a declining Marty Cordova, Nixon, and Lawton.

=== Season standings ===
AL Central
Team	W	L	Pct.	GB	Home	Road
Cleveland Indians	89	73	.549	—	46‍–‍35	43‍–‍38
Chicago White Sox	80	82	.494	9	44‍–‍37	36‍–‍45
Kansas City Royals	72	89	.447	16½	29‍–‍51	43‍–‍38
Minnesota Twins	70	92	.432	19	35‍–‍46	35‍–‍46
Detroit Tigers	65	97	.401	24	32‍–‍49	33‍–‍48

=== Record vs. opponents ===
1998 American League record Source: MLB Standings Grid – 1998
Team	ANA	BAL	BOS	CWS	CLE	DET	KC	MIN	NYY	OAK	SEA	TB	TEX	TOR	NL
Anaheim	—	5–6	6–5	5–6	4–7	8–3	6–5	6–5	6–5	5–7	9–3	6–5	5–7	4–7	10–6
Baltimore	6–5	—	6–6	2–9	5–6	10–1	5–6	7–3	3–9	8–3	6–5	5–7	6–5	5–7	5–11
Boston	5–6	6–6	—	5–6	8–3	5–5	8–3	5–6	5–7	9–2	7–4	9–3	6–5	5–7	9–7
Chicago	6–5	9–2	6–5	—	6–6	6–6	8–4	6–6	4–7	4–7	4–7	5–6	5–6	4–6–1	7–9
Cleveland	7–4	6–5	3–8	6–6	—	9–3	8–4	6–6	4–7	3–8	9–2	7–3	4–7	7–4	10–6
Detroit	3–8	1–10	5–5	6–6	3–9	—	6–6	8–4	3–8	7–4	3–8	5–6	3–8	5–6	7–9
Kansas City	5–6	6–5	3–8	4–8	4–8	6–6	—	7–5	0–10	7–4	4–6	8–3	3–8	6–5	9–7
Minnesota	5–6	3–7	6–5	6–6	6–6	4–8	5–7	—	4–7	4–7	2–9	7–4	7–4	4–7	7–9
New York	5–6	9–3	7–5	7–4	7–4	8–3	10–0	7–4	—	8–3	8–3	11–1	8–3	6–6	13–3
Oakland	7–5	3–8	2–9	7–4	8–3	4–7	4–7	7–4	3–8	—	5–7	5–6	6–6	5–6	8–8
Seattle	3–9	5–6	4–7	7–4	2–9	8–3	6–4	9–2	3–8	7–5	—	6–5	5–7	4–7	7–9
Tampa Bay	5–6	7–5	3–9	6–5	3–7	6–5	3–8	4–7	1–11	6–5	5–6	—	4–7	5–7	5–11
Texas	7–5	5–6	5–6	6–5	7–4	8–3	8–3	4–7	3–8	6–6	7–5	7–4	—	7–4	8–8
Toronto	7–4	7–5	7–5	6–4–1	4–7	6–5	5–6	7–4	6–6	6–5	7–4	7–5	4–7	—	9–7

=== Roster ===
1998 Minnesota Twins
Roster
Pitchers: 38 Rick Aguilera; 24 Travis Baptist; 58 Héctor Carrasco; 18 Eddie Guardado; 32 LaTroy Hawkins; 20 Travis Miller; 41 Eric Milton; 30 Mike Morgan; 31 Dan Naulty; 22 Brad Radke; 23 Todd Ritchie; 33 Frankie Rodriguez; 53 Benj Sampson; 16 Dan Serafini; 17 Greg Swindell; 39 Bob Tewksbury; 21 Mike Trombley	Catchers: 9 A. J. Pierzynski; 36 Terry Steinbach; 26 Javier Valentín; Infielders: 8 Ron Coomer; 5 Brent Gates; 7 Denny Hocking; 47 Corey Koskie; 2 Pat Meares; 9 Orlando Merced; 51 Doug Mientkiewicz; 4 Paul Molitor; 27 David Ortiz; 15 Jon Shave; 37 Scott Stahoviak; 12 Todd Walker	Outfielders: 40 Marty Cordova; 48 Torii Hunter; 28 Chris Latham; 50 Matt Lawton; 1 Otis Nixon; 25 Alex Ochoa	Manager: 10 Tom Kelly; Coaches: 46 Terry Crowley (hitting); 35 Ron Gardenhire (third base); 43 Rick Stelmaszek (bullpen); 44 Dick Such (pitching); 45 Scott Ullger

== Notable transactions ==
- January 14: Signed first baseman/outfielder Orlando Merced as a free agent.
- February 6: Traded second baseman Chuck Knoblauch to the New York Yankees in exchange for outfielder Brian Buchanan, shortstop Cristian Guzmán, pitcher Eric Milton, pitcher Danny Mota, and cash.
- April 3: Claimed pitcher Héctor Carrasco off waivers from the Arizona Diamondbacks.
- May 26, 1998: Pitcher Doug Linton was signed as a free agent.
- July 31: Traded Merced and pitcher Greg Swindell to the Boston Red Sox for outfielder John Barnes, pitcher Matt Kinney, and Joe Thomas.
- August 25: Traded pitcher Mike Morgan to the Chicago Cubs for a player to be named later and cash. On November 3, the Cubs sent pitcher Scott Downs to the Twins to complete the trade.
- September 29: First baseman Scott Stahoviak granted free agency.
- September 30: Infielder Brent Gates granted free agency. He was re-signed on December 15.

== Miscellaneous ==
- In February, Paul Molitor received the 1997 Lou Gehrig Memorial Award recognizing his exemplary contributions in both community and philanthropy. Molitor is the third Twin to receive the award, following Harmon Killebrew (1971) and Kent Hrbek (1991).
- The lone representative of the Twins in the All-Star Game was pitcher Brad Radke.
- After a 9-for-10 weekend (July 24–26) at the Dome, Todd Walker raised his batting 18 points to take the league lead at .352. He singled in his first July 28 at-bat in Kansas City to tie club records for consecutive hits (9) and consecutive times on base (11). With a chance to set new records, he struck out looking in the fourth inning.
- The highest paid Twin in 1998 was Paul Molitor at $4,250,000; followed by Terry Steinbach at $2,850,000.
- Molitor also received the 1998 Branch Rickey Award, given annually to an individual in Major League Baseball (MLB) in recognition of his exceptional community service. Kirby Puckett, in 1993, is the only other Twin to receive this award.

== Player stats ==
=== Batting ===
==== Starters by position ====
Note: Pos = Position; G = Games played; AB = At bats; R = Runs; H = Hits; HR = Home runs; RBI = Runs batted in; Avg. = Batting average; Slg. = Slugging average; SB = Stolen bases

Pos	Player	G	AB	R	H	HR	RBI	Avg.	Slg.	SB
C	Terry Steinbach	124	422	45	102	14	54	.242	.410	0
1B	David Ortiz	86	278	47	77	9	46	.277	.446	1
2B	Todd Walker	143	528	85	167	12	62	.316	.473	19
3B	Ron Coomer	137	529	54	146	15	72	.276	.406	2
SS	Pat Meares	149	543	56	141	9	70	.260	.368	7
LF	Marty Cordova	119	438	52	111	10	69	.253	.377	3
CF	Otis Nixon	110	448	71	133	1	20	.297	.344	37
RF	Matt Lawton	152	557	91	155	21	77	.278	.478	16
DH	Paul Molitor	126	502	75	141	4	69	.281	.382	9

==== Other batters ====
Note: G = Games played; AB = At bats; H = Hits; Avg. = Batting average; HR = Home runs; RBI = Runs batted in

Player	G	AB	H	Avg.	HR	RBI
Brent Gates	107	333	83	.249	3	42
Alex Ochoa	94	249	64	.257	2	25
Orlando Merced	63	204	59	.289	5	33
Denny Hocking	110	198	40	.202	3	15
Javier Valentín	55	162	32	.198	3	18
Chris Latham	34	94	15	.160	1	5
Jon Shave	19	40	10	.250	1	5
Corey Koskie	11	29	4	.138	1	2
Doug Mientkiewicz	8	25	5	.200	0	2
Scott Stahoviak	9	19	2	.105	1	1
Torii Hunter	6	17	4	.235	0	2
A. J. Pierzynski	7	10	3	.300	0	1

=== Pitching ===
==== Starting pitchers ====
Note: G = Games pitched; IP = Innings pitched; W = Wins; L = Losses; ERA = Earned run average; SO = Strikeouts

Player	G	IP	W	L	ERA	SO
Brad Radke	32	213.2	12	14	4.30	146
LaTroy Hawkins	33	190.1	7	14	5.25	105
Eric Milton	32	172.1	8	14	5.64	107
Bob Tewksbury	26	148.1	7	13	4.79	60
Mike Morgan	18	98.0	4	2	3.49	50

==== Other pitchers ====
Note: G = Games pitched; IP = Innings pitched; W = Wins; L = Losses; ERA = Earned run average; SO = Strikeouts

Player	G	IP	W	L	ERA	SO
Dan Serafini	28	75.0	7	4	6.48	46
Frank Rodriguez	20	70.0	4	6	6.56	62
Benj Sampson	5	17.1	1	0	1.56	50

==== Relief pitchers ====
Note: G = Games pitched; W = Wins; L = Losses; SV = Saves; ERA = Earned run average; SO = Strikeouts

Player	G	W	L	SV	ERA	SO
Rick Aguilera	68	4	9	38	4.24	57
Eddie Guardado	79	3	1	0	4.52	53
Mike Trombley	77	6	5	1	3.63	89
Héctor Carrasco	63	4	2	1	4.38	46
Greg Swindell	52	3	3	2	3.66	45
Dan Naulty	19	0	2	0	4.94	15
Todd Ritchie	15	0	0	0	5.63	21
Travis Miller	14	0	2	0	3.86	23
Travis Baptist	13	0	1	0	5.67	11

== Other post-season awards ==
- Calvin R. Griffith Award (Most Valuable Twin) – Matt Lawton
- Joseph W. Haynes Award (Twins Pitcher of the Year) – Mike Trombley
- Bill Boni Award (Twins Outstanding Rookie) – Eric Milton
- Charles O. Johnson Award (Most Improved Twin) – Todd Walker
- Dick Siebert Award (Upper Midwest Player of the Year) – Rick Helling
  - The above awards are voted on by the Twin Cities chapter of the BBWAA
- Carl R. Pohlad Award (Outstanding Community Service) – Terry Steinbach
- Sherry Robertson Award (Twins Outstanding Farm System Player) – Doug Mientkiewicz

== Farm system ==
Level	Team	League	Manager
AAA	Salt Lake Buzz	Pacific Coast League	Phil Roof
AA	New Britain Rock Cats	Eastern League	John Russell
A	Fort Myers Miracle	Florida State League	Mike Boulanger
A	Fort Wayne Wizards	Midwest League	Jose Marzan
Rookie	Elizabethton Twins	Appalachian League	Jon Mathews
Rookie	GCL Twins	Gulf Coast League	Steve Liddle
