= Kenosha Twins =

- 1984–1992; Kenosha, Wisconsin

Minor league affiliations
- Class: Class A (1984–1992)
- League: Midwest League (1984–1992)

Major league affiliations
- Team: Minnesota Twins (1984–1992)

Minor league titles
- League titles (2): 1985; 1987

Team data
- Ballpark: Simmons Field (1984–1992)

The Kenosha Twins were a Minor League Baseball team that played in Kenosha, Wisconsin, from 1984 to 1992. They began play in the Midwest League in 1984 when the Wisconsin Rapids Twins relocated. The team played their home games at Simmons Field in Kenosha. The Twins won two Midwest League championships, in 1985 and 1987, and were Northern Division champions for the first half of the 1988 season. The team was sold in 1992 and relocated to Fort Wayne, Indiana, as the Fort Wayne Wizards after the season.

== The ballpark ==
The Kenosha minor league baseball teams hosted their home games at Simmons Field. In the era, Simmons Field was located on Sheridan Road near the shore of Lake Michigan in Kenosha. The ballpark opened in 1920, when the local Simmons Bedding Company’s baseball team needed a ballpark to host their team. Still in use today, Simmons Field is located at 7817 Sheridan Road in Kenosha, Wisconsin.

== Notable alumni ==
- Eddie Guardado (1991–92) 2x MLB All-Star; 2002 AL Saves Leader
- Damian Miller (1992) MLB All-Star
- Dan Naulty (1992)
- Brad Radke (1992) MLB All-Star
- Rich Becker (1991)
- Midre Cummings (1991)
- Denny Hocking (1991)
- Todd Ritchie (1991)
- Marty Cordova (1990) 1995 AL Rookie of the Year
- Pat Meares (1990)
- Jayhawk Owens (1990)
- Rich Garces (1989)
- Chuck Knoblauch (1989) 4x MLB All-Star; 1991 AL Rookie of the Year
- Pat Mahomes (1989)
- Denny Neagle (1989) 2 x MLB All-Star; 1997 NL Wins Leader
- Alan Newman (1989)
- Mike Trombley (1989)
- Willie Banks (1988)
- Ron Gardenhire (1988, MGR) 2010 AL Manager of the Year
- Lenny Webster (1986–88)
- Chip Hale (1987)
- Scott Leius (1987)
- Paul Abbott (1986–87)
- Yorkis Perez (1986)
- Duffy Dyer (1984–85, MGR)

== Year-by-year records ==
Year	Record	Finish	Manager	Playoffs
1984	70-68	6th	Duffy Dyer	Did not qualify
1985	79-60	3rd	Duffy Dyer	League Champs
1986	46-92	12th	Don Leppert	Did not qualify
1987	82-58	2nd	Don Leppert	League Champs
1988	81-59	4th	Ron Gardenhire	Lost League Finals
1989	63-66	9th	Steve Liddle	Did not qualify
1990	61-77	10th	Steve Liddle	Did not qualify
1991	63-74	11th	Joel Lepel	Did not qualify
1992	63-70	8th	Jim Dwyer	Did not qualify
