= Scott Klingenbeck =

American baseball player (1971–2025)

- Pitcher
- Born: February 3, 1971; Cincinnati, Ohio, U.S.
- Died: May 20, 2025 (aged 54)
- Batted: Right Threw: Right

MLB debut
- June 2, 1994, for the Baltimore Orioles

Last MLB appearance
- June 23, 1998, for the Cincinnati Reds

MLB statistics
- Win–loss record: 5–8
- Earned run average: 6.91
- Strikeouts: 75
- Stats at Baseball Reference

Teams
- Baltimore Orioles (1994–1995); Minnesota Twins (1995–1996); Cincinnati Reds (1998)
Medals
Men's baseball
Representing United States
World Junior Baseball Championship
Gold medal – first place	1989 Trois-Rivières	Team

Scott Edward Klingenbeck (February 3, 1971 – May 20, 2025) was an American Major League Baseball (MLB) pitcher who played in parts of four seasons with the Baltimore Orioles, Minnesota Twins, and Cincinnati Reds.

== Early career ==
A native of Cincinnati, Ohio, Klingenbeck graduated from Oak Hills High School in 1989, and attended Allegany College of Maryland and Ohio State University. He won 10 games for the Buckeyes in 1990 and 11 in 1991, both of which rank among the top 10 single season win totals in program history. He led the team in innings pitched both seasons, as well. In 1991, he played collegiate summer baseball with the Chatham A's of the Cape Cod Baseball League.

== Pro career ==
He was selected by the Orioles in the 5th round of the 1992 MLB draft. Seven total Ohio State players were selected that year.

Klingenbeck pitched seven innings and was the winning pitcher in his MLB debut in the Orioles' 11–5 home win over the Detroit Tigers on 2 June 1994. He had been promoted from the Bowie Baysox earlier that day to replace the injured Ben McDonald. He made five starts with the Orioles in 1995. The last one was a 6–3 home loss to the Twins on 4 July in which he and Scott Erickson were the pitchers of record, three days before they were traded for each other on 7 July in a transaction which was completed two months later on 19 September when Kimera Bartee was sent to Minnesota. He started seven games and had 18 overall appearances for the Twins over the 1995 and 1996 seasons before being traded to his hometown Reds in April 1997. He spent 1997 with the Triple-A Indianapolis Indians and then started four games for Cincinnati in 1998. His took the loss against the Kansas City Royals in his last MLB appearance on June 23, 1998, and was released by the Reds in July. He pitched the rest of the season for the Pittsburgh Pirates Triple-A affiliate Nashville and then finished his career pitching for Indianapolis again in 1999.

== Personal life and death ==
Klingenbeck's nephew Kyle pitched in college for Northern Kentucky University and Austin Peay.

He owned a now-closed sports bar named Hot Wings Sports Café in Cincinnati.

Klingenbeck died on May 20, 2025, at the age of 54.
