= Mike Misuraca =

American baseball player (born 1968)

- Pitcher
- Born: August 21, 1968 (age 56); Long Beach, California, U.S.
- Batted: Right Threw: Right

MLB debut
- July 27, 1997, for the Milwaukee Brewers

Last MLB appearance
- August 11, 1997, for the Milwaukee Brewers

MLB statistics
- Win–loss record: 0–0
- Earned run average: 11.32
- Strikeouts: 10
- Stats at Baseball Reference

Teams
- Milwaukee Brewers (1997)

Michael William Misuraca (born August 21, 1968) is a retired Major League Baseball pitcher. He played during one season at the major league level for the Milwaukee Brewers. He was signed by the Minnesota Twins as an amateur free agent in 1988. Misuraca played his first professional season with their Rookie League Elizabethton Twins and Class A Kenosha Twins in 1989, and his last with the Brewers' Triple-A Tucson Toros in 1997.
