= Mike Durant (baseball) =

American baseball player (born 1969)

- Catcher
- Born: September 14, 1969 (age 56); Columbus, Ohio
- Batted: Right Threw: Right

MLB debut
- April 3, 1996, for the Minnesota Twins

Last MLB appearance
- September 29, 1996, for the Minnesota Twins

MLB statistics
- Batting average: .210
- Hits: 17
- Runs Batted In: 5
- Stats at Baseball Reference

Teams
- Minnesota Twins (1996)

Michael Joseph Durant (born September 14, 1969) is a retired Major League Baseball catcher. He played during one season at the major league level for the Minnesota Twins.

A native of Columbus, Ohio, Durant played college baseball for Ohio State. In 1989 and 1990, he played collegiate summer baseball with the Yarmouth–Dennis Red Sox of the Cape Cod Baseball League and was named a league all-star in 1990.

He was drafted by the Twins in the second round of the 1991 MLB draft. Durant played his first professional season with their Class A Kenosha Twins in 1991, and his last with their Triple-A Salt Lake Buzz in 1997.
