= Kimera Bartee =

American baseball player and coach (1972–2021)

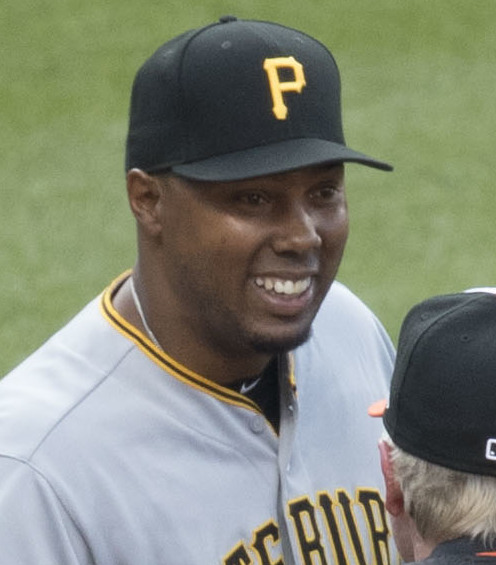
- Bartee with the Pittsburgh Pirates in 2017
- Outfielder
- Born: July 21, 1972; Omaha, Nebraska, U.S.
- Died: December 21, 2021 (aged 49); Omaha, Nebraska, U.S.
- Batted: Switch Threw: Right

MLB debut
- April 3, 1996, for the Detroit Tigers

Last MLB appearance
- August 3, 2001, for the Colorado Rockies

MLB statistics
- Batting average: .216
- Home runs: 4
- Runs batted in: 33
- Stats at Baseball Reference

Teams
- As player: Detroit Tigers (1996–1999); Cincinnati Reds (2000); Colorado Rockies (2001); As coach: Pittsburgh Pirates (2017–2019); Philadelphia Phillies (2020); Detroit Tigers (2021)

Kimera Anotchi Bartee (July 21, 1972 – December 20, 2021) was an American professional baseball outfielder and coach. Bartee played in Major League Baseball (MLB) for the Detroit Tigers, Cincinnati Reds, and Colorado Rockies from 1996 to 2001. He coached in the minor leagues and returned to MLB as a coach for the Pittsburgh Pirates in 2017. He later coached for the Philadelphia Phillies, before rejoining the Tigers as first base coach in 2021.

== Early life ==
Bartee was born in Omaha, Nebraska, and is an alumnus of Omaha Central High School. The first graduate of Omaha Central to play major league baseball, he was inducted into the Omaha Public Schools Athletic Hall of Fame in 2018.

== College career ==
Bartee attended Creighton University, where he played college baseball for the Creighton Bluejays. He appeared with Creighton in the 1991 College World Series. In 1992, he played collegiate summer baseball with the Hyannis Mets of the Cape Cod Baseball League.

== Professional playing career ==
The Baltimore Orioles selected Bartee in the 14th round of the 1993 MLB draft. He was sent to the Minnesota Twins on 19 September 1995 as the player to be named later to complete a transaction from two months prior on 7 July when Scott Klingenbeck was acquired from the Orioles for Scott Erickson. He returned to the Orioles when he was selected from the Twins in the Rule 5 draft on December 4, 1995. He was claimed off waivers by the Detroit Tigers from the Orioles during the subsequent spring training on March 13, 1996. He made his major league debut with the Tigers three weeks later on April 3, 1996. Over the following few seasons, he played for the Tigers as well as the Toledo Mud Hens at triple-A. In 1997, he was named by Baseball America the fastest baserunner and best defensive outfielder in the International League. He was traded in 1999 from Detroit to the Cincinnati Reds, where he spent most of 2000 with the triple-A Louisville RiverBats.

Bartee joined the Los Angeles Angels as a free agent the following season, when a bulging disk in his lower back landed him in Class-A Rancho Cucamonga for a rehabilitation assignment. On July 13, 2001, he was traded by the Angels to the Colorado Rockies for future All-Star Chone Figgins. Rockies general manager Dan O'Dowd described the move as the worst transaction he made in his 12-year term in that position. Bartee went hitless in 15 at bats with the Rockies before his final Major League game on August 3, 2001.

In 2003 and 2004, Bartee played outfield for the Long Island Ducks of the Atlantic League of Professional Baseball, earning All-Star honors and later an Atlantic League championship with the Ducks in 2004.

== Coaching career ==
After retiring as a player, Bartee returned to baseball as a coach, at least in part because the job provided health insurance. Bartee became a coach for the Delmarva Shorebirds and also served as roving instructor for the Pittsburgh Pirates before landing the managerial job for the State College Spikes.

Bartee served as the first base coach and outfielder instructor for the Pittsburgh Pirates from 2017 through 2019. In 2020, he served as the roving baserunning and bunting coordinator for the Philadelphia Phillies. Before the 2021 season, the Tigers hired Bartee as their roving outfield and baserunning coordinator. On July 16, 2021, Bartee was named first base coach for the Tigers. The Tigers retained him as their first base coach for the 2022 season.

== Personal life and death ==
Bartee had three children, Andrew, Amari and Taeja.

On December 20, 2021, Bartee died after collapsing while visiting his father in Omaha. In the ensuing autopsy, the medical examiner found a large tumor in his brain. He was 49 years old.
