= Scott Erickson =

American baseball player (born 1968)

- Pitcher
- Born: February 2, 1968 (age 58); Long Beach, California, U.S.
- Batted: Right Threw: Right

MLB debut
- June 25, 1990, for the Minnesota Twins

Last MLB appearance
- June 8, 2006, for the New York Yankees

MLB statistics
- Win–loss record: 142–136
- Earned run average: 4.59
- Strikeouts: 1,252
- Stats at Baseball Reference

Teams
- Minnesota Twins (1990–1995); Baltimore Orioles (1995–2000, 2002); New York Mets (2004); Texas Rangers (2004); Los Angeles Dodgers (2005); New York Yankees (2006)

Career highlights and awards
- All-Star (1991); World Series champion (1991); AL wins leader (1991); Pitched a no-hitter on April 27, 1994

Scott Gavin Erickson (born February 2, 1968) is an American former Major League Baseball pitcher. He played for the Minnesota Twins, Baltimore Orioles, New York Mets, Texas Rangers, Los Angeles Dodgers, and New York Yankees over 15 seasons. He was a member of the 1991 World Series champion Twins.

== Early life ==
Erickson was born in Long Beach, California. He played baseball, soccer, football, and basketball at Homestead High School, in Cupertino, California. He was CCS Junior of the Year in baseball.

After completing his secondary education, he graduated from San Jose City College in 1988 with an AA degree in business. He was a Junior College 1st Team All American at San Jose. He then majored in accounting with a minor in psychology at the University of Arizona. Erickson was inducted into the Arizona Wildcat Hall of Fame after just one year of pitching at Arizona. Erickson set a school record for wins with an 18–3 record, as he led the country in wins (18), innings pitched (175), and complete games (14). Those impressive numbers earned him a unanimous First Team All-American honor. His teammates at Arizona included Trevor Hoffman, Kevin Long, and J. T. Snow. In 1989, he played collegiate summer baseball with the Cotuit Kettleers of the Cape Cod Baseball League.

== Career ==
=== Minor leagues ===
Erickson began his professional career after being selected in the major league draft four times. He was drafted by the New York Mets in 1986 out of Homestead High School; the Houston Astros in 1987 and Toronto Blue Jays in 1988 out of San Jose City College; and in 1989 he was drafted by the Minnesota Twins in the 4th round of the amateur draft out of the University of Arizona. He finally signed his first pro contract with Minnesota. After 27 minor league starts, Erickson rose to the major leagues in his second season of professional baseball with the Class AA Orlando Sun Rays. He was on a five-game win streak with a record of 8–3 in the first half as an All Star in the Southern League.

=== Major leagues ===
==== Minnesota Twins ====
Erickson finished 1990 with a combined record of 16–7 between Double-A and the majors; he went 5–0 in September and tied Dave Stewart for American League Pitcher of the Month. In 1991, Erickson posted a record of 12–2 with a 1.39 ERA in the first half season and was awarded the American League Pitcher of the Month for May and June. The Twins went on to win the World Series, and Erickson finished second to Roger Clemens for the American League Cy Young Award and received votes for the American League Most Valuable Player Award.

The following season, Erickson started 32 games, going 13–12 with 5 complete games. He regressed the following year, however, leading the majors with 19 losses. On April 27, 1994, Erickson no-hit the Milwaukee Brewers 6–0 at the Hubert H. Humphrey Metrodome, the first no-hitter ever pitched in that stadium. He became the third Twins pitcher, after Jack Kralick in 1962 and Dean Chance in 1967, to pitch a no-hitter; the former's had been the last no-hitter in a Twins home game, that game having taken place at the Metrodome's predecessor, Metropolitan Stadium.

==== Baltimore Orioles ====
In 1995, he started with a 4-6 record and 5.95 ERA with the Twins. His last start with the team was a 6–3 away win over the Baltimore Orioles on 4 July in which he and Scott Klingenbeck were the pitchers of record, three days before they were traded for each other on 7 July in a fire sale transaction which was completed two months later on 19 September when Kimera Bartee was sent to Minnesota. More effective after the trade, Erickson turned in 9 wins in 16 starts for Baltimore. Between both teams, he finished 13–10 with 7 complete games. In 1996, Erickson won 13 games for the second straight year, with 6 complete games and 100 strikeouts for the 6th straight year. In 1997, Erickson turned in his best season since 1992, winning 16 games with a 3.69 ERA in 33 starts. He later signed a five-year, $32 million contract with Baltimore through 2003. In 1998, Erickson once again won 16 games for the Orioles, while leading the league in complete games (11) and innings pitched (251 1/3).

In 1999, Erickson went 15–12 with a 4.81 ERA while leading the league in shutouts (3). He also led the majors in ground balls induced with 454.

On March 3, 2000, Erickson had bone chips removed from his elbow, and was out of action eight weeks. Erickson made 16 starts for the Orioles in 2000. He was hampered by the nagging elbow issue and visited the disabled list twice, the second one being a season ending elbow injury. After over 2000 innings pitched, the elbow injury caused him to miss the entire 2001 season. Erickson returned in 2002, becoming the first pitcher to start Opening Day after missing an entire season. That season, he made 28 starts, pitching 160 2/3 innings. In 2003, Erickson suffered a torn labrum and missed the entire 2003 season.

==== Later career ====
In 2004, Erickson signed a minor league deal with the New York Mets. Set back by injury, he made his Mets' debut in July, then was traded to the Texas Rangers at the July 31 deadline.

He was in the starting rotation for the Los Angeles Dodgers in 2005.

Erickson signed a deal with the New York Yankees on February 16, 2006. He pitched in nine games for the Yankees before being released on June 19, and officially retired from baseball at the beginning of the 2007 season.

=== Pitching profile ===
Erickson was a groundball pitcher. He led the league five times in most double plays in a season and is in the Top 5 in Major League history for groundball to flyout ratio.

== Post-playing career ==
Erickson was the pitching coach for the Cleveland Indians Class A Advanced affiliate Carolina Mudcats of the Carolina League in 2012 and Mahoning Valley Scrappers of the New York–Penn League He was also the President of MLM, majorleaguemechanics.com, a pitching mechanics tutorial with professional instruction. Beginning in 2015, he has been a game analyst for the Pac-12 Network.

== Personal life ==
In late 2000, Erickson was featured in People magazine's "50 Most Beautiful People" edition. In 2004, Erickson married Lisa Guerrero, a television personality, actress, and investigative reporter with whom he founded HomeTeam Productions. They were executive producers for the 2008 movie A Plumm Summer. The marriage ended in divorce in 2019.

=== Legal issues ===
In 2002, Erickson was arrested and charged with second-degree assault after an argument with then-girlfriend Lisa Ortiz spilled out into the hallway outside their condominium. Investigators later dropped the charges.

On January 27, 2021, the Los Angeles County District Attorney's office charged Erickson with reckless driving in connection with a 2020 hit-and-run that killed two young children. Prosecutors alleged that Erickson and his then-lover Rebecca Grossman, a wealthy socialite and estranged wife of a prominent doctor, had been drinking cocktails at Julio's, a restaurant in Westlake Village. They left Julio's in their separate SUVs and raced their vehicles through suburban streets at over 80 miles per hour (130 km/h), and struck and killed the two young brothers at a Westlake Village crosswalk. Grossman's defense team argued that it was Erickson who struck the boys, but the jury was not convinced and found Grossman guilty of double second degree murder. Erickson's misdemeanor charge in connection with the crash was later dismissed after he made a public service message about safe driving. Both Erickson and Grossman were found liable in a civil suit, with the parents of the victims being awarded a joint $176 million in compensatory damages from Grossman and Erickson, and $1.17 million in individual punitive damages from Erickson.

== See also ==
- List of Major League Baseball annual wins leaders
- List of Major League Baseball career hit batsmen leaders
- List of Major League Baseball no-hitters

Awards and achievements
Preceded by Kent Mercker	No-hitter; April 27, 1994	Succeeded by Kenny Rogers
