= Oscar Munoz (baseball) =

American baseball player (born 1969)

- Pitcher
- Born: September 25, 1969 (age 56); Hialeah, Florida, U.S.
- Batted: Right Threw: Right

MLB debut
- August 6, 1995, for the Minnesota Twins

Last MLB appearance
- September 30, 1995, for the Minnesota Twins

MLB statistics
- Win–loss record: 2–1
- Earned run average: 5.60
- Strikeouts: 25
- Stats at Baseball Reference

Teams
- Minnesota Twins (1995)

Juan Oscar Munoz (born September 25, 1969) is an American former Major League Baseball pitcher.

Munoz attended the University of Miami and was drafted by the Cleveland Indians in the fifth round of the 1990 amateur draft. He played in the Cleveland farm system until 1991. While with the Kinston Indians of the Carolina League, Munoz threw a no-hitter against the Prince William Cannons on May 26, 1991.

On March 28, 1992, Munoz and Curt Leskanic were traded to the Minnesota Twins organization for Paul Sorrento. While with Nashville in the Southern League, Munoz was named to the 1993 all-star team and was awarded Southern League Pitcher of the Year honors. He remained in the Twins farm system until 1995, when he was called up to the majors. In ten games, Muñoz went 2–1 with a 5.60 ERA.

During the off-season, Munoz was selected off waivers by the Baltimore Orioles. He wound up his playing career playing for Rochester in the International League in 1996.

== Sources ==
- Career statistics from Baseball Reference · Baseball Reference (Minors) · Retrosheet · Baseball Almanac
- Johnson, Lloyd; Wolff, Miles (1997). The Encyclopedia of Minor League Baseball, second ed. Baseball America, Inc. ISBN 0-9637189-8-3.
