= Marty Cordova =

American baseball player (born 1969)

- Left fielder
- Born: July 10, 1969 (age 57); Las Vegas, Nevada, U.S.
- Batted: Right Threw: Right

MLB debut
- April 26, 1995, for the Minnesota Twins

Last MLB appearance
- April 21, 2003, for the Baltimore Orioles

MLB statistics
- Batting average: .274
- Home runs: 122
- Runs batted in: 540
- Stats at Baseball Reference

Teams
- Minnesota Twins (1995–1999); Toronto Blue Jays (2000); Cleveland Indians (2001); Baltimore Orioles (2002–2003)

Career highlights and awards
- AL Rookie of the Year (1995)

Martin Kevin Cordova (born July 10, 1969) is an American former professional baseball left fielder who played in Major League Baseball (MLB) for the Minnesota Twins, Toronto Blue Jays, Cleveland Indians, and Baltimore Orioles. He was born in Las Vegas, Nevada. Before embarking on a major league career, Cordova played six seasons in the minor leagues.

== Baseball career ==
Cordova began his pro career in the minors in 1989 with the Elizabethton Twins of the Appalachian League. After a season in rookie ball, Cordova moved up to Single–A and spent the 1990 season with the Kenosha Twins of the Mid West League. Cordova would then go onto spend the next two seasons with the Visalia Oaks of the Advanced-A California League 1991-1992. After spending two years in High–A, Cordova made the move up to Double–A. In 1993 Cordova joined the Nashville Xpress of the Southern League. In 1994, Cordova moved up to Triple–A and played the season for the Salt Lake Buzz of the Pacific Coast League.

A promising and talented player, Cordova was named the American League Rookie of the Year in 1995. He took the honor over, among others, Garret Anderson, Andy Pettitte, Troy Percival and Shawn Green, after hitting .277 with 24 home runs and 84 RBI for the Twins. His second season saw career-highs in batting average (.309), RBI (111), runs (97) and doubles (46).

Cordova had the potential to hit for average and power, but was often bothered by back injuries over his career. Between 1997 and 2000, he missed 240 games while on the injured list. In January 2000, the Boston Red Sox signed Cordova to a minor league contract after he became too pricey for the small-market Twins, especially considering his history of injuries. The 30-year-old asked for his release from the Red Sox before the season even began, clearing the way for him to eventually sign with the Toronto Blue Jays.

He returned in good form with the Indians in 2001, hitting .301 with 20 home runs, and in 2002, with the Orioles, he belted 18 homers. Cordova appeared in just nine games in 2003 and missed all of 2004 and after two operations on his right elbow. In January 2005, Cordova signed a minor league contract with the Tampa Bay Devil Rays. He retired a day after he was scheduled to report to spring training. In a nine-season career, Cordova was a .274 hitter with 122 home runs and 540 RBI in 952 games.

== Post-baseball life ==
Cordova is a friend of UFC President Dana White and can be seen in several of White's video blogs. He was shown on White's video blog trying to enter Canada after he forgot his passport as he flew in White's private jet. When asked about the incident White joked that Cordova (despite having played for the Blue Jays) had not realized Toronto was not in the United States. Cordova was the COO of Bent Pixels, a digital media network focused around YouTube creators.

Preceded by Bob Hamelin	Players Choice AL Most Outstanding Rookie; 1995	Succeeded by Derek Jeter
