= Dan Masteller =

American baseball player (born 1968)

- First baseman
- Born: March 17, 1968 (age 57); Toledo, Ohio, U.S.
- Batted: Left Threw: Left

MLB debut
- June 23, 1995, for the Minnesota Twins

Last MLB appearance
- October 1, 1995, for the Minnesota Twins

MLB statistics
- Batting average: .237
- Home runs: 3
- Runs batted in: 21
- Stats at Baseball Reference

Teams
- Minnesota Twins (1995)

Dan Patrick Masteller (born March 17, 1968) is an American former Major League Baseball first baseman. He played one season in the majors for the Minnesota Twins in 1995.

Originally drafted by the Twins in the 11th round of the 1989 Major League Baseball draft, Masteller played in their organization until June, 1995, when he made his major league debut.

On July 28, 1995, Masteller came to bat in the bottom of the ninth in a 3-3 game against Yankees' Cy Young winner Jack McDowell. Carrying a sub-.200 average, with no one out and a man on first, it was a classic bunt situation. But manager Tom Kelly allowed Masteller to swing away, and on McDowell's first pitch, he hit a walk-off home run into the upper deck, just inside the right-field foul pole.

Masteller was released after the season, and played for the Harrisburg Senators in the Montreal Expos organization in 1996 before his career ended.
