= Rich Becker =

American baseball player (born 1972)

- Outfielder
- Born: February 1, 1972 (age 53); Aurora, Illinois, U.S.
- Batted: Left Threw: Left

MLB debut
- September 10, 1993, for the Minnesota Twins

Last MLB appearance
- October 1, 2000, for the Detroit Tigers

MLB statistics
- Batting average: .256
- Home runs: 45
- Runs batted in: 243
- Stats at Baseball Reference

Teams
- Minnesota Twins (1993–1997); New York Mets (1998); Baltimore Orioles (1998); Milwaukee Brewers (1999); Oakland Athletics (1999–2000); Detroit Tigers (2000)

Richard Godhard Becker (born February 1, 1972) is an American former professional baseball outfielder. He played in Major League Baseball (MLB) for the Minnesota Twins, New York Mets, Baltimore Orioles, Milwaukee Brewers, Oakland Athletics, and Detroit Tigers.

== Career ==
Born in Aurora, Illinois, Becker was selected in the third round of the 1990 MLB draft out of West Aurora High School by the Minnesota Twins. In high school Becker, played competitive football and baseball. In football, he played quarterback and running back on offense and corner back on defense. However, he excelled on the baseball diamond and as a result had come to the attention of elite college baseball programs and scouts from MLB. Becker spent his first minor league season with the Elizabethton Twins. He played in 56 games, had 194 at-bats with 56 base hits, including six home runs for a .289 batting average. He played for the Kenosha Twins, Visalia Oaks and the Nashville Xpress teams before being called up to the Minnesota Twins in 1993.

Becker made his MLB debut in 1993 as a switch hitter. Appearing in three games with seven at-bats, getting two hits and it was decided that he needed another trip to the PCL Salt Lake Buzz before getting a full-time job. He was called upon again in 1994 and in 28 games with 98 at-bats he hit .265. However, he achieved greater success batting exclusively from the left side of the plate. During the 1995 minor league season, for 36 games he hit .316 and was called up again to the show with the Minnesota Twins. 1995 was Becker's first full year with the Twins. In 1996, manager Tom Kelly put Becker in the position of succeeding Kirby Puckett as the Twins starting center fielder. However, he responded with his best year as a major leaguer, batting .291 with 12 home runs, 71 runs batted in (RBIs) and 19 stolen bases. On July 13 of that year, he had his best day, getting four hits—including two home runs, a double, and six RBIs. However, his numbers declined the following year, and the Twins traded Becker for Alex Ochoa in December 1997. Subsequent to the trade, Becker bounced among several teams, finding marginal playing time with the Baltimore Orioles, New York Mets, Milwaukee Brewers, Oakland Athletics, and Detroit Tigers.

Following the 2002 season, Becker retired from baseball. His career stats in 789 MLB games are: 2,227 at-bats, 570 base hits, with 45 home runs with a .256 batting average and 66 stolen bases.

Becker's minor league numbers show 770 games, 2,851 at-bats, 821 hits, with 75 home runs and a .287 batting average. Becker had spent 13 seasons in professional baseball and was just 31 years of age upon retirement.

Rich Becker was the only player to come out of the third round of the 1990 draft and sustain any sort of long-term career.

In a 2019 interview with Patrick Reusse, Becker's former manager, Tom Kelly, attributed Becker's low hit by pitch totals to Becker being afraid of the baseball. https://www.skornorth.com/episode/reusse-on-baseball-reuvers-talks-town-ball-classic-tk-double-header/
