= Scott Watkins =

American baseball player

- Pitcher
- Born: May 15, 1970 (age 54); Tulsa, Oklahoma
- Batted: Left Threw: Left

MLB debut
- August 1, 1995, for the Minnesota Twins

Last MLB appearance
- September 30, 1995, for the Minnesota Twins

MLB statistics
- Win–loss record: 0–0
- Earned run average: 5.40
- Strikeouts: 11
- Stats at Baseball Reference

Teams
- Minnesota Twins (1995)

Scott Allen Watkins (born May 15, 1970) is a former Major League Baseball pitcher. Watkins pitched in 1995 for the Minnesota Twins, appearing in 27 games with no wins or losses.

Watkins began his college baseball career at Oral Roberts University as a freshman. He later played at Seminole State College in Oklahoma where he helped the Trojans to a National Junior College Athletic Association regional championship in 1990. He next committed to continue his college baseball career with the Oklahoma Sooners before switching his commitment to Oklahoma State.

== Sources ==
- Career statistics from Baseball Reference, or Baseball Reference (Minors)
