= Brian Raabe =

American baseball player (born 1967)

Bethel Royals
- Third baseman / Second baseman / Head coach
- Born: November 5, 1967 (age 58); New Ulm, Minnesota, U.S.
- Batted: Right Threw: Right

Professional debut
- MLB: September 17, 1995, for the Minnesota Twins
- NPB: April 4, 1998, for the Seibu Lions

Last appearance
- MLB: September 28, 1997, for the Colorado Rockies
- NPB: June 30, 1998, for the Seibu Lions

MLB statistics
- Batting average: .207
- Home runs: 0
- Runs batted in: 2

NPB statistics
- Batting average: .277
- Home runs: 2
- Runs batted in: 12
- Stats at Baseball Reference

Teams
- Minnesota Twins (1995–1996); Seattle Mariners (1997); Colorado Rockies (1997); Seibu Lions (1998)

Brian Charles Raabe (RAH-bee; born November 5, 1967) is an American former Major League Baseball infielder who played for the Minnesota Twins (1995–1996), Seattle Mariners (1997), and Colorado Rockies (1997). He played for the Seibu Lions of Nippon Professional Baseball in 1998. He is currently the head baseball coach at Bethel University.

== Amateur career ==
A native of New Ulm, Minnesota, Raabe attended New Ulm High School and played on a team that went to the 1985 American Legion Baseball World Series. He then attended the University of Minnesota. With the Golden Gophers, he was a three-time All-Big Ten Conference infielder and a 1990 first-team All-American. He was inducted into the university's athletics half of fame in 2021.

In 1989, Raabe played collegiate summer baseball with the Wareham Gatemen of the Cape Cod Baseball League and was named a league all-star.

== Professional career ==
The Minnesota Twins selected Raabe in the 41st round of the 1990 MLB draft. He made his major league debut for Minnesota in 1995 and also played for the club the following season. He was released by Minnesota after the 1996 season and signed as a free agent with the Seattle Mariners. The Mariners traded Raabe to the Colorado Rockies in September 1997. He appeared in two games for the Rockies.

Following the 1997 season, Raabe was purchased from Colorado by the Seibu Lions of the Japan Pacific League. He played 37 games for them in 1998, mostly at second base. He played in Triple-A in 1999. He was a Triple-A All-Star in 1996, 1997, and 1999.

== Coaching career ==
Raabe was the head baseball coach at Forest Lake Area High School from 2001 to 2011. He became the head baseball coach at Bethel University in St. Paul, Minnesota in 2012, winning his 300th game with the program in 2024.

== Personal life ==
Raabe is married and has two children. His son also played baseball for the Minnesota Golden Gophers and was drafted by the Milwaukee Brewers in the eighth round of the 2021 MLB draft.
