= Steve Dunn (1990s first baseman) =

American baseball player

- First baseman
- Born: April 18, 1970 (age 55); Champaign, Illinois
- Batted: Left Threw: Left

MLB debut
- May 3, 1994, for the Minnesota Twins

Last MLB appearance
- September 28, 1995, for the Minnesota Twins

MLB statistics
- Batting average: .195
- Home runs: 0
- Runs batted in: 4
- Stats at Baseball Reference

Teams
- Minnesota Twins (1994–1995)

Steven Robert Dunn (born April 18, 1970) is a former Major League Baseball first baseman. He was drafted by the Minnesota Twins in the 4th round of the 1988 amateur draft, and played for the Twins in 1994 and 1995.

Dunn attended Robinson Secondary School in Fairfax, Virginia from 1984 to 1988 where he earned Washington Post All-Metropolitan Baseball honors in 1987 and 1988. Dunn was a top 10 Baseball America magazine prospect in 1988, but had committed to the University of North Carolina at Chapel Hill (UNC) prior to the 1988 amateur draft which resulted in his slide to the 4th round. After attending a Minnesota Twins game in which he took batting and fielding practice with the team prior to the game, Dunn rescinded his commitment to UNC and signed with Twins for a $100,000 signing bonus.

In nine minor league seasons (1988–1996) Dunn put up consistently good numbers each year, and had a total of 110 home runs, 587 runs batted in, and a .283 batting average. Both in 1994 and 1995 he hit over .300 for the Salt Lake Buzz of the Pacific Coast League, earning call-ups to Minnesota.

He made his major league debut on May 3, 1994, starting a game against the Milwaukee Brewers at County Stadium. He went 2-for-4 with a single against Bill Wegman and a double against Mike Fetters. The Twins lost, however, 7–6.

The Twins released Dunn on November 20, 1995 and he signed with the Cleveland Indians before the 1996 season. He played 92 games for the Buffalo Bisons of the American Association, but never again reached the major league level.

He went on to become both a baseball coach and a humanities teacher of East Tennessee's Alcoa High School where he still teaches. He is married and has three girls.
