= Alan Newman (baseball) =

American baseball player (born 1969)

- Pitcher
- Born: October 2, 1969 (age 56); La Habra, California, U.S.
- Batted: Left Threw: Left

Professional debut
- MLB: May 14, 1999, for the Tampa Bay Devil Rays
- NPB: April 3, 2001, for the Yakult Swallows

Last appearance
- MLB: June 26, 2000, for the Cleveland Indians
- NPB: May 25, 2003, for the Hiroshima Toyo Carp

MLB statistics
- Win–loss record: 2–2
- Earned run average: 7.94
- Strikeouts: 20

NPB statistics
- Win–loss record: 5–8
- Earned run average: 4.38
- Strikeouts: 112
- Stats at Baseball Reference

Teams
- Tampa Bay Devil Rays (1999); Cleveland Indians (2000); Yakult Swallows (2001–2002); Hiroshima Toyo Carp (2003)

Alan Spencer Newman (born October 2, 1969) is an American former professional baseball pitcher. He played parts of two seasons in Major League Baseball, in 1999 for the Tampa Bay Devil Rays and 2000 for the Cleveland Indians. He then went on to play three seasons in Japan, 2001–02 for the Yakult Swallows and 2003 for the Hiroshima Toyo Carp.
