= Todd Ritchie =

American baseball player (born 1971)

- Pitcher
- Born: November 7, 1971 (age 54); Portsmouth, Virginia, U.S.
- Batted: Right Threw: Right

MLB debut
- April 3, 1997, for the Minnesota Twins

Last MLB appearance
- September 30, 2004, for the Tampa Bay Devil Rays

MLB statistics
- Win–loss record: 43–54
- Earned run average: 4.71
- Strikeouts: 516
- Stats at Baseball Reference

Teams
- Minnesota Twins (1997–1998); Pittsburgh Pirates (1999–2001); Chicago White Sox (2002); Milwaukee Brewers (2003); Tampa Bay Devil Rays (2004)

Todd Everett Ritchie (born November 7, 1971) is an American former Major League Baseball (MLB) pitcher who played in the major leagues from 1997-2004.

Ritchie was drafted by the Minnesota Twins in the 1st round (12th overall) of the 1990 Major League Baseball draft and made his major league debut on April 3, 1997. He pitched in 57 games for the Twins in 1997 and 1998.

On October 3, 1998, the Twins released him, and he signed with the Pittsburgh Pirates on December 22. Ritchie was used as a starting pitcher by the Pirates and in 1999, he won a career-high 15 games. He was their Opening Day starter in 2001, on in which he went 11-15; on July 13 of that year, in a scoreless game against the Kansas City Royals at PNC Park, he had a no-hitter broken up with one out in the ninth by a Luis Alicea single. The Pirates won the game in the bottom of the ninth as Aramis Ramírez singled in Brian Giles with the winning run.

After the 2001 season, on December 13, Ritchie was traded to the Chicago White Sox along with Lee Evans for Kip Wells, Sean Lowe, and Josh Fogg. He struggled in 2002 though, losing 15 games with a 6.06 ERA, and becoming a free agent after the season. On January 14, 2003, he signed with the Milwaukee Brewers, but missed nearly the entire season with an injury. Ritchie signed as a free agent with the Tampa Bay Devil Rays for 2004, but spent most of the season in the minors. He signed with the Pirates for the 2005 season, but retired from baseball during spring training. He came out of retirement in 2008, signing a contract with the Colorado Rockies. Assigned to Single-A Modesto, Ritchie had a 3.18 ERA in 4 appearances before being promoted to Double-A Tulsa on June 25. In his one appearance for Tulsa, he gave up 8 earned runs in 5.2 innings and retired again.
