= Pat Meares =

American baseball player (born 1968)

- Shortstop
- Born: September 6, 1968 (age 57); Salina, Kansas, U.S.
- Batted: Right Threw: Right

MLB debut
- May 5, 1993, for the Minnesota Twins

Last MLB appearance
- October 7, 2001, for the Pittsburgh Pirates

MLB statistics
- Batting average: .258
- Home runs: 58
- Runs batted in: 382
- Stats at Baseball Reference

Teams
- Minnesota Twins (1993–1998); Pittsburgh Pirates (1999–2001)

Patrick James Meares (born September 6, 1968) is an American former Major League Baseball shortstop.

Meares was the 12th round draft pick of the 1990 amateur draft by the Minnesota Twins, from Wichita State University.

Meares made his major league debut on May 5, 1993 with the Minnesota Twins. In 6 years with the Twins, he compiled a .265 batting average and 6.0 WAR. He led the American League in errors by a shortstop with 18 in 1995 and played in a career high 152 games in 1996. He was granted free agency after the 1998 season. Meares made the final out of David Wells' perfect game on May 17, 1998, flying out to New York Yankees right fielder Paul O'Neill.

In February 1999 Meares signed a 1 year, $1.5 million dollar contract with the Pittsburgh Pirates. During a spring training game that year he was hit by a pitch, causing an injury to his left hand. The injury was initially thought to be minor, and Meares attempted to play through it. After only six games with the Pirates, the team gave him a 4 year, $15 million dollar contract extension; this contract was signed before either side knew how serious the injury was. The Pirates initially thought it was a sprain but eventually Meares was found to have a broken bone, torn ligaments and shredded tendons in his hand which affected his ability to grip a bat.

In 1999 he hit .308 but was limited to just 21 games and in 2000 he hit a career high 13 home runs, but the injury continued to worsen. As time went on the relationship between Meares and the Pirates became strained; the Pirates considered him to be injured and kept him on the disabled list, while Meares wanted to have either a chance to play or be released to look for an opportunity with another team. Many of his teammates supported Meares and set up a makeshift shrine in his locker. Eventually Meares would spend the final two years of his Pirates contract on the disabled list before retiring in 2003.
