= Erik Schullstrom =

American baseball player (born 1969)

- Pitcher
- Born: March 25, 1969 (age 57); San Diego, California, U.S.
- Batted: Right Threw: Right

Professional debut
- MLB: July 18, 1994, for the Minnesota Twins
- NPB: April 11, 1998, for the Nippon-Ham Fighters

Last appearance
- MLB: September 27, 1995, for the Minnesota Twins
- NPB: August 4, 2002, for the Hiroshima Toyo Carp

MLB statistics
- Win–loss record: 0–0
- Earned run average: 6.00
- Strikeouts: 34

NPB statistics
- Win–loss record: 9–5
- Earned run average: 2.67
- Strikeouts: 93
- Stats at Baseball Reference

Teams
- Minnesota Twins (1994–1995); Nippon-Ham Fighters (1998–1999); Hiroshima Toyo Carp (2001–2002)

Erik Paul Schullstrom (born March 25, 1969) is an American former professional baseball pitcher who played for the Minnesota Twins in 1994 and 1995. Listed at 6 ft 5 in (1.96 m), 220 pounds, Schullstrom threw and batted right-handed. After ending his playing career, he became an American scout for the Hiroshima Toyo Carp.

== Early life ==
Schullstrom was born in San Diego, California and attended Alameda High School where he was voted Oakland Tribune Northern California Pitcher of the year in 1987. He then attended Fresno State University where he was a Freshman All-American by Baseball America in 1988 after going 14–2 with 11 complete games. The Bulldogs were ranked #1 in the nation after winning 32 consecutive games, and eventually finished tied for seventh in the College World Series. He also was a member of the U.S. Collegiate National Team in 1988.

== Career ==
Schullstrom was drafted out of high school by the Toronto Blue Jays 620th overall in the 24th round of the 1987 Major League Baseball draft. Deciding not to sign and play college baseball, he was selected 51st overall in the second round of the 1990 draft by the Baltimore Orioles.

In the minors, Schullstrom spent time starting and relieving. On July 3, 1991, starting for the Frederick Keys at Class A+ Carolina League, he pitched a 2–0 no-hitter against the Kinston Indians. He started working as a reliever in 1993, converting to a full-time reliever in 1994 before returning to starting in 1996.

Schullstrom was traded twice by the Orioles within a span of a year. He was first dealt to the Padres for Craig Lefferts on August 31, 1992 in a deal which was completed four days later on September 4 when Ricky Gutiérrez joined him in San Diego. He was claimed off waivers on April 2, 1993 by the Orioles who sent him to the Twins 4 1/2 months later on August 16 to complete a transaction from the previous day in which Mike Pagliarulo went to Baltimore.

On July 18, 1994, Schullstrom made his major league debut as a 25-year-old rookie for the Twins. In nine games that year, he posted an ERA of 2.77 and had 13 strikeouts in 13 innings of work. His success did not carry over to the next season: in 37 games in 1995, he had a 6.89 ERA.

He set an MLB record by pitching 60 innings without being awarded a decision, i.e. a win or a loss.

On September 27, 1995, Schullstrom played his final major league game. He then pitched for the Acereros de Monclova and Sultanes de Monterrey of the Mexican League in 1997. He played four seasons in Nippon Professional Baseball in Japan, two for the Nippon-Ham Fighters in 1998 and 1999, and two for the Hiroshima Toyo Carp in 2001 and 2002.

In 2003, Schullstrom began working for the Hiroshima Toyo Carp, the last team he pitched for, as a scout in the United States. He replaced the retiring Satoshi Hirayama, who also played at Fresno State and in Japan. By 2008, Schullstrom was the team's U.S. scouting director.

Schullstrom resides in Alameda, California.
