= Scott Stahoviak =

American baseball player (born 1970)

- First baseman
- Born: March 6, 1970 (age 56); Waukegan, Illinois, U.S.
- Batted: Left Threw: Right

MLB debut
- September 10, 1993, for the Minnesota Twins

Last MLB appearance
- July 3, 1998, for the Minnesota Twins

MLB statistics
- Batting average: .256
- Home runs: 27
- Runs batted in: 119
- Stats at Baseball Reference

Teams
- Minnesota Twins (1993, 1995–1998)
Medals
Men's baseball
Representing United States
World Junior Baseball Championship
Gold medal – first place	1988 Sydney	Team

Scott Edmund Stahoviak (born March 6, 1970) is an American former professional baseball first baseman. He played in Major League Baseball for the Minnesota Twins. He attended Creighton University, and was an integral part of Creighton's NCAA College World Series appearance in 1991. He batted left-handed and threw right-handed.

Stahoviak was drafted by the Twins in the first round (27th overall) in the 1991 amateur draft. He signed with the Twins on June 13, 1991. He made his major league debut in 1993 and also played from 1995 through 1998. Stahoviak played at least part of every season in the minor leagues from 1991 until 2000 except 1996. His last two seasons were spent in the Chicago Cubs organization.

He is currently a PE teacher at Maple Middle School in Northbrook, Illinois.
