= 1992 National League Championship Series =

24th edition of Major League Baseball's National League Championship Series

Team (Wins)	Managers	Season
Atlanta Braves (4)	Bobby Cox	98–64, .605, GA: 8
Pittsburgh Pirates (3)	Jim Leyland	96–66, .593, GA: 9
- Dates: October 6–14
- MVP: John Smoltz (Atlanta)
- Umpires: John McSherry; Randy Marsh; Steve Rippley; Gary Darling; Gerry Davis; Ed Montague

Broadcast
- Television: CBS
- TV announcers: Sean McDonough and Tim McCarver
- Radio: CBS
- Radio announcers: John Rooney and Jerry Coleman

The 1992 National League Championship Series was a best-of-seven semifinal series in Major League Baseball’s 1992 postseason played between the Atlanta Braves (98–64) and the Pittsburgh Pirates (96–66) from October 6 to 14. A rematch of the 1991 NLCS, Atlanta won the 1992 NLCS in seven games to advance to their second straight World Series. The series ended in dramatic fashion; in the bottom of the ninth inning of Game 7, with Atlanta down 2–1 and the bases loaded, the Braves' Francisco Cabrera cracked a two-run single that scored David Justice and Sid Bream. Bream famously slid to score the Series-winning run, beating the throw by Pirates left fielder Barry Bonds.

The Braves would go on to lose to the Toronto Blue Jays in the World Series in six games, while the Pirates did not return to the playoffs until 2013, suffering a sports-record 20 consecutive losing season drought.

As of 2026, this is Pittsburgh’s last postseason appearance outside of the divisional round.

== The teams ==
The Braves were attempting to return to the World Series one year after their dramatic seven-game loss to the Minnesota Twins. Atlanta featured largely the same lineup that had won the 1991 pennant, but they still fell into a tie for last place, seven games behind the Giants, by the end of May. However, Atlanta went 19–6 in June and 16–9 in July and pulled away from the rest of the NL West by winning 15 of their first 18 games in August.

The Pirates were in the NLCS for the third year in a row after losing to the eventual World Series champion Cincinnati Reds in 1990 and the Braves in 1991. It was also the third of four straight NLCS appearances by either the Pirates or their in-state rivals, the Philadelphia Phillies. The 1992 NLCS would also be the first time two teams faced each other in back-to-back postseasons since 1978, when all three postseason series were rematches of 1977.

The Pirates lost slugging right fielder Bobby Bonilla to free agency after the 1991 season, replacing him with speedster Alex Cole. Ace pitcher John Smiley was traded to the Minnesota Twins. Despite the departure of Smiley and Bonilla, Pittsburgh charged out to a seven-game lead by late June, suffered through an 11–15 July that allowed the Montreal Expos to tie them for the lead by the end of the month, then won 11 straight in early August before pulling away from the Expos in September to earn its third straight NL East title, becoming the first team to win three straight NL East titles since the Phillies from 1976 to 1978. Future home run champion Barry Bonds won his second MVP Award and led the Pirates with 34 home runs and 103 RBI.

Pressure beyond the moment made it imperative for the Pirates to break through and win the pennant in 1992. Financial demands had already resulted in losing Smiley and Bonilla, and the departure of pending free agents Bonds (left fielder) and Doug Drabek (starting pitcher) loomed. 1992 appeared to be the last chance for Pittsburgh to win with its current core of players.

=== Atlanta Braves vs. Pittsburgh Pirates ===
Atlanta won the series, 4–3.

Game	Date	Score	Location	Time	Attendance
1	October 6	Pittsburgh Pirates – 1, Atlanta Braves – 5	Atlanta–Fulton County Stadium	3:20	51,971
2	October 7	Pittsburgh Pirates – 5, Atlanta Braves – 13	Atlanta–Fulton County Stadium	3:20	51,975
3	October 9	Atlanta Braves – 2, Pittsburgh Pirates – 3	Three Rivers Stadium	2:37	56,610
4	October 10	Atlanta Braves – 6, Pittsburgh Pirates – 4	Three Rivers Stadium	3:10	57,164
5	October 11	Atlanta Braves – 1, Pittsburgh Pirates – 7	Three Rivers Stadium	2:52	52,929
6	October 13	Pittsburgh Pirates – 13, Atlanta Braves – 4	Atlanta–Fulton County Stadium	2:50	51,975
7	October 14	Pittsburgh Pirates – 2, Atlanta Braves – 3	Atlanta–Fulton County Stadium	3:22	51,975

== Game summaries ==
=== Game 1 ===
Tuesday, October 6, 1992 (8:42 pm EDT) at Atlanta–Fulton County Stadium in Atlanta, Georgia

Team	1	2	3	4	5	6	7	8	9	R	H	E
Pittsburgh	0	0	0	0	0	0	0	1	0	1	5	1
Atlanta	0	1	0	2	1	0	1	0	X	5	8	0
WP: John Smoltz (1–0) LP: Doug Drabek (0–1); Home runs: PIT: José Lind (1); ATL: Jeff Blauser (1)

The first game of the NLCS pitted Atlanta's John Smoltz against Pittsburgh ace Doug Drabek. Smoltz was the winning pitcher in Game 7 of the previous NLCS, where the Braves shut out the Pirates, 4–0. Drabek had won once and lost once in the 1991 NLCS.

The Braves scored all five of their runs in the first seven innings. In the second, Mark Lemke's single scored Sid Bream to put Atlanta on the board. They added two more in the fourth inning as Bream doubled to score David Justice and then scored on an error when Orlando Merced threw the ball away while attempting to field a bunt. Jeff Blauser's home run in the fifth made it 4–0, and Terry Pendleton drove in Otis Nixon in the seventh to complete the Braves' scoring.

The Pirates' José Lind was responsible for his team's only run as he homered in the eighth inning off of Smoltz. Lind's run, however, was the first the Pirates had scored against the Braves in 30 innings, going back to Lind's RBI single in Game 5 of the 1991 NLCS.

Smoltz went eight innings for the win, while Drabek suffered the loss and was pulled in the fifth inning.

=== Game 2 ===
Wednesday, October 7, 1992 (3:08 pm EDT) at Atlanta–Fulton County Stadium in Atlanta, Georgia

Team	1	2	3	4	5	6	7	8	9	R	H	E
Pittsburgh	0	0	0	0	0	0	4	1	0	5	7	0
Atlanta	0	4	0	0	4	0	5	0	X	13	14	0
WP: Steve Avery (1–0) LP: Danny Jackson (0–1); Home runs: PIT: None; ATL: Ron Gant (1)

Atlanta's Steve Avery, who defeated Pittsburgh twice in the 1991 NLCS without surrendering a run, started Game 2 in Atlanta while Danny Jackson, who was a late season acquisition from the Chicago Cubs, started for Pittsburgh.

The Braves scored early and often in Game 2. Jackson gave up a single to Brian Hunter, then walked Ron Gant. Damon Berryhill followed with a single to drive in Hunter, and Mark Lemke added one of his own to score Gant. Avery then flied out to center field to score Berryhill from third, and after Otis Nixon popped out Jeff Blauser followed with a triple, scoring Berryhill and chasing Jackson from the game. In the fifth, Gant faced Bob Walk with the bases loaded and two out. On the third pitch of the at-bat Gant hit a deep fly ball to left field that cleared the fence for a grand slam home run, his first career grand slam.

With Avery still pitching a shutout into the seventh, the Pirates struck. With Barry Bonds on base and one out, Lloyd McClendon doubled to score him. Don Slaught followed with a walk and Jose Lind hit a triple after that, scoring both runners ahead of him and making it an 8–3 game. With Cecil Espy batting, Avery then threw a wild pitch enabling Lind to score and cut the lead in half. After Espy singled, Marvin Freeman came in to relieve the tiring Avery and retired Orlando Merced to get the second out. Jay Bell followed with a single, but Mike Stanton forced Andy Van Slyke to ground out to end the inning.

The Braves put the game out of reach in the bottom of the seventh. With Gant on base and two outs, Stanton doubled him home. Denny Neagle then intentionally walked Nixon and unintentionally walked Blauser, then gave up a double to Terry Pendleton to score Stanton and Nixon. David Justice then singled, scoring Blauser and Pendleton and ending Neagle's afternoon. The Braves did not score again, and after Slaught scored on a passed ball in the eighth nothing further was done and the Braves took a 2–0 lead in the series with a 13–5 victory.

Avery kept his winning streak in postseason play intact, having yet to lose in five postseason starts. Jackson took the loss after giving up the first four Atlanta runs.

=== Game 3 ===
Friday, October 9, 1992 (8:39 pm EDT) at Three Rivers Stadium in Pittsburgh, Pennsylvania

Team	1	2	3	4	5	6	7	8	9	R	H	E
Atlanta	0	0	0	1	0	0	1	0	0	2	5	0
Pittsburgh	0	0	0	0	1	1	1	0	X	3	8	1
WP: Tim Wakefield (1–0) LP: Tom Glavine (0–1); Home runs: ATL: Sid Bream (1), Ron Gant (2); PIT: Don Slaught (1)

As play moved to Three Rivers Stadium in Pittsburgh, Atlanta turned to 20-game winner Tom Glavine to try to give them a 3–0 series lead. Pittsburgh countered with rookie Tim Wakefield, a knuckleballer who had made 13 starts during the season.

The first run of the game came in the top of the fourth as Sid Bream homered to give the Braves an early 1–0 lead. In the bottom of the next inning, Don Slaught hit a home run of his own to tie the score. The Pirates added a run in the sixth to take the lead as Andy Van Slyke scored on a Jeff King double. Ron Gant hit a home run in the top of the seventh to tie the game, but the Pirates scored what proved to be the winning run in the bottom of the seventh as Van Slyke doubled to score Gary Redus.

Wakefield pitched a complete game and earned a victory. Glavine took the loss after pitching seven innings.

=== Game 4 ===
Saturday, October 10, 1992 (8:39 pm EDT) at Three Rivers Stadium in Pittsburgh, Pennsylvania

Team	1	2	3	4	5	6	7	8	9	R	H	E
Atlanta	0	2	0	0	2	2	0	0	0	6	11	1
Pittsburgh	0	2	1	0	0	0	1	0	0	4	6	1
WP: John Smoltz (2–0) LP: Doug Drabek (0–2) Sv: Jeff Reardon (1)

Game 4 saw a rematch of the Game 1 starters, as Doug Drabek faced John Smoltz for the second time.

As they had in Game 1, Atlanta scored early against Drabek. With two runners on and two out in the second, Smoltz drove in the first run by singling to center and scoring Ron Gant. Otis Nixon followed by singling himself, scoring Mark Lemke. Pittsburgh responded in their half by scoring twice, as a single by Alex Cole with one out scored Mike LaValliere. On the same play, Jose Lind scored as Jeff Blauser made a throwing error at shortstop. Orlando Merced drove in a run in the third by doubling home Jeff King.

In the top of the fifth, the Braves scored again as David Justice singled with two runners on, scoring Nixon. Randy Tomlin came in to face pinch-hitter Brian Hunter, and he promptly grounded to third. King, however, decided to throw home to try to get Blauser at the plate and made an error allowing a second run to score. Atlanta scored twice more the next inning as Nixon drove in Smoltz with a two out double and scored himself when Blauser singled off of Danny Cox. Andy Van Slyke drove in Cole with a double in the seventh but the Pirates got no closer and Jeff Reardon shut them down in the ninth inning to earn his first save of the postseason.

Smoltz, in addition to scoring a run and driving in a run, stole a base and got his second win of the series. Drabek took his second loss, having failed to get out of the fifth inning for a second time in as many starts. The Braves now had a 3–1 series lead and needed only one more win to advance to their second consecutive World Series.

=== Game 5 ===
Sunday, October 11, 1992 (8:44 pm EDT) at Three Rivers Stadium in Pittsburgh, Pennsylvania

Team	1	2	3	4	5	6	7	8	9	R	H	E
Atlanta	0	0	0	0	0	0	0	1	0	1	3	0
Pittsburgh	4	0	1	0	0	1	1	0	X	7	13	0
WP: Bob Walk (1–0) LP: Steve Avery (1–1)

Looking to clinch the series, the Braves trotted out Steve Avery for the second time in the series. The Pirates decided not to go back to Danny Jackson after his performance in Game 2 and instead called on Bob Walk, who also saw action in Game 2 and gave up the grand slam to Ron Gant that broke the game open, to make his first start of the series

This time, the Pirates solved Avery after failing to do so in any of his three previous starts against them in the LCS. Gary Redus led off the home first with a double, scoring on a single by Jay Bell. Avery then induced a groundout off the bat of Andy Van Slyke, which turned out to be the only out he recorded. Barry Bonds, Jeff King, and Lloyd McClendon all doubled following the first out, and three more runs scored before Avery was pulled. McClendon scored Bonds on a sacrifice fly in the third, Redus doubled in Don Slaught in the sixth, and Slaught drove in King in the seventh with a single to make it 7–0. The Braves' only run came in the eighth, as Lonnie Smith led off the inning with a triple and scored on a groundout. Smith's triple was one of only three hits Walk allowed in a complete game, the second for the Pirates in the series.

As it took the Pirates until 2013 to reach the playoffs again, Game 5 of the NLCS was the last postseason game ever played in Three Rivers Stadium.

=== Game 6 ===
Tuesday, October 13, 1992 (8:44 pm EDT) at Atlanta–Fulton County Stadium in Atlanta, Georgia

Team	1	2	3	4	5	6	7	8	9	R	H	E
Pittsburgh	0	8	0	0	4	1	0	0	0	13	13	1
Atlanta	0	0	0	1	0	0	1	0	2	4	9	1
WP: Tim Wakefield (2–0) LP: Tom Glavine (0–2); Home runs: PIT: Barry Bonds (1), Jay Bell (1), Lloyd McClendon (1); ATL: David Justice 2 (2)

Game 6 saw the series return to Atlanta, with Tom Glavine taking on Tim Wakefield in a Game 3 rematch.

Once again, as in Game 5, the Pirates scored early and often. After retiring the Pirates in order in the first, Glavine collapsed in the second. Barry Bonds led off with a home run, and after singles by Jeff King and Lloyd McClendon, Don Slaught drove them both in with a double. An error by Jeff Blauser allowed Slaught to score, and after Wakefield reached on a sacrifice bunt attempt Gary Redus hit his fourth double of the series to drive in Jose Lind. Jay Bell then homered to score Redus and Wakefield. Glavine was pulled after this, having faced eight batters in the second without an out.

With the Pirates' lead at 8–1 in the fifth, Lind doubled to score Slaught and McClendon, scored himself on a single by Redus, who scored on a single by Andy Van Slyke. McClendon's home run in the sixth ended the Pittsburgh scoring. David Justice hit two home runs in the late innings but they were meaningless as the Pirates tied the series. The stadium was largely empty by the end of the game as most fans left once the Pirates put the game out of reach—a bad omen for the Braves as seven of the previous ten teams that managed to come back from a 3–1 deficit to force a Game 7 had gone on to complete the comeback.

Wakefield again went the distance for his second win—a somewhat questionable decision by Leyland, since had he removed him earlier once he had a comfortable lead, Wakefield could have been available for relief duty in Game 7 to supplant Pittsburgh's notoriously unreliable bullpen. Glavine's eight run, one-inning outing garnered him his second loss.

=== Game 7 ===
Wednesday, October 14, 1992 (8:30 pm EDT) at Atlanta–Fulton County Stadium in Atlanta, Georgia

Team	1	2	3	4	5	6	7	8	9	R	H	E
Pittsburgh	1	0	0	0	0	1	0	0	0	2	7	1
Atlanta	0	0	0	0	0	0	0	0	3	3	7	0
WP: Jeff Reardon (1–0) LP: Doug Drabek (0–3)

The deciding game of the NLCS featured the third matchup of the series between John Smoltz and Doug Drabek, after Games 1 and 4. Smoltz was an MVP candidate for the series, having started and won both of his games. Drabek had struggled in his two starts, failing to make it past the fifth inning in either matchup. However, the Pirates were carrying momentum from their previous two wins, having knocked out Steve Avery in the first inning and Tom Glavine in the second on their way to outscoring the Braves, 20–5, and looked to become the first team to win the NLCS after trailing, 3–1. The game that followed was regarded as one of the greatest ever, as years later MLB Network ranked it the fourth best game of all time.

The Pirates scored first as Alex Cole led off with a walk, advanced to third on a double by Andy Van Slyke, and scored on a sacrifice fly by Orlando Merced. The Pirates would add a run in the sixth as Jay Bell scored on a single by Van Slyke, and the lead held up as Drabek pitched his best game of the series in holding the Braves scoreless. The closest the Braves got to breaking through was in the sixth inning, when Drabek allowed three consecutive singles to Mark Lemke, Jeff Treadway, and Otis Nixon to load the bases. Jeff Blauser, however, lined into an unassisted double play and Terry Pendleton lined out to Barry Bonds in left to end the threat.

An incident involving the umpires early in the game set a different tone that would come into play later on. In the second inning, home plate umpire John McSherry became ill and complained of nausea and dizziness. After being checked out by the stadium medical staff, McSherry was removed from the game as a precaution and first base umpire Randy Marsh was summoned over from his position to take over behind the plate. The move gave both Smoltz and Drabek a different target to hit for strikes as Marsh had a consistent strike zone that was much tighter than McSherry's. This was also the first public sign of what would later prove to be fatal cardiac issues for the veteran umpire; it was one of five times he would leave games with similar symptoms, and in 1996, on Opening Day in Cincinnati, McSherry went into cardiac arrest and died on the field at Riverfront Stadium while behind the plate.

Although Drabek was able to hold the Braves in check, giving up only five hits in the first eight innings, the Pirates failed to take advantage of multiple opportunities in the late innings to add an insurance run. Mike LaValliere led off the seventh inning with a single off of Mike Stanton, and after José Lind lined out he advanced to second on a bunt by Drabek. Lloyd McClendon then pinch-hit for Cole and was intentionally walked. Pete Smith then entered the game and issued a third walk to Bell, loading the bases for Van Slyke. However, the Braves got out of the jam when Game 5 loser Steve Avery, making a rare relief appearance, came in and induced a fly out to center field.

After the Braves failed to score in the seventh, Avery faced the middle of the Pirates' order in the top of the eighth. Bonds led off with a single, but was thrown out on a force play at second with Merced reaching first. Jeff King followed with a double, but Justice threw out Merced trying to score for the second out. LaValliere lined out to end the inning. In the ninth, Braves closer Jeff Reardon retired Lind on a fly out. With the pitcher due next, Jim Leyland decided to keep Drabek in the game and he struck out for the second out. McClendon drew a walk, then advanced on a wild pitch. Pinch runner Cecil Espy came in to replace McClendon, but he was stranded at second base as Bell grounded out.

Pittsburgh was now three outs away from advancing to their first World Series since 1979. If the lead held, Braves manager Bobby Cox would have become the first manager in the era of seven-game LCS play to have blown two 3–1 series leads and lost; Cox previously had seen this happen in 1985, when his Toronto Blue Jays lost to the eventual World Series champion Kansas City Royals after being one victory away from going to the World Series.

Terry Pendleton led off the home ninth with a double off of Drabek. David Justice followed by hitting a sharp grounder to José Lind, who was eventually awarded a Gold Glove at second base for the season. Lind, however, misplayed the ball, and Pendleton advanced to third on the error. Drabek then walked former teammate Sid Bream on four pitches, which moved the tying run into scoring position and loaded the bases.

With the winning run now on base and Ron Gant scheduled next, Leyland made a pitching change and brought in his closer, Stan Belinda, to make his second appearance of the series and attempt to preserve the victory for Drabek, who was responsible for all three baserunners. Gant hit a deep fly ball that was caught by Bonds, enabling Pendleton to score and put the Braves on the board. Damon Berryhill was the next batter and worked a 3–1 count out of Belinda. The next pitch appeared to cross the plate in the strike zone, but Marsh called it ball four; it was later speculated that at least two if not three of the pitches called balls to Berryhill would have been called strikes with McSherry behind the plate. Berryhill’s walk once again loaded the bases and moved the winning run, represented by a relatively slow-footed baserunner in Bream, into scoring position.

With the pitcher's spot due in two batters, Cox went to his bench for a pinch hitter and summoned Brian Hunter to bat in place of second baseman Rafael Belliard. Belinda got him to pop up on the second pitch of the at-bat, which was caught for the second out by Lind. Francisco Cabrera, who had only appeared in seventeen games that season for the Braves, was sent up to try and keep Atlanta's season alive.

Belinda fell behind Cabrera 2–0, then got a strike after Cabrera hit a sharp line drive foul to left. Before the next pitch, centerfielder Van Slyke signaled to leftfielder Bonds, who was a lefthanded fielder, to move in a few steps, so as not to allow the winning run to score if Cabrera hit it to left again. Bonds, refusing to move, responded by giving the finger to his teammate.

On the next pitch, Cabrera again hit a liner to left. The ball dropped in for a hit in front of Bonds, scoring Justice with the tying run. As Bonds went to field the ball, Atlanta third base coach Jimy Williams watched the play develop. Bream, having had multiple knee injuries during the course of his career, was considered to be one of the slowest baserunners in the game. However, Williams saw that Bonds' positioning would cause him to throw the ball away from the plate, which would have forced LaValliere, the catcher to field the throw and then come back across the plate to make a tag, and thus made the decision to wave Bream around. As he had suspected, the throw from Bonds came in to the right, and the extra second that LaValliere needed to field the ball allowed Bream to slide in ahead of the tag with the winning run.

The victory was picked up by Jeff Reardon, who pitched the ninth inning. The loss was charged to Drabek, who took his third defeat of the series—though two of the three the runs he was charged with were unearned, stemming from the Lind error. Smoltz, with his two victories and solid start keeping the Braves in the game in Game 7, was named the series MVP.

Andy Van Slyke sat motionless in centerfield for several minutes after the game ended, while the Braves celebrated at home plate.

In the celebration at home plate after Sid Bream's pennant-winning slide, Braves pitcher Kent Mercker was hurt and unable to pitch in the World Series.

Game 7 of the 1992 NLCS marked the first time (and to date, still the only time) in MLB history that a team which was one out away from losing in a winner-take-all game of a playoff series instead won on the last pitch. To date, Francisco Cabrera is the only player in MLB history to win a postseason series with a hit during an at bat in which he could have lost the series with an out. All other series walk-off hits occurred either with the score already tied (as with Bill Mazeroski's 1960 World Series winning home run) or in a game that was not winner-take-all, as with Joe Carter's home run to win the 1993 World Series, which occurred in Game 6.

The March 1993 issue of Baseball Digest pronounced it the greatest baseball comeback ever, as did John Smoltz immediately after the game. A 2006 study by the Pittsburgh Post-Gazette pronounced Cabrera's game-winning single the eighth-"clutchest" hit in MLB history. ESPN called the Pirates' defeat the eighth most painful in baseball history. Don Ohlmeyer, the former head of NBC Sports and President of NBC West Coast, supposedly called the event "one of the most exciting baseball moments he had ever seen".

Game 7 was the last postseason game for the Pirates until 2013, when the team faced and defeated the Cincinnati Reds in the National League Wild Card Game. The Pirates also went 20 years without a winning season after 1992. Game 7 was the last Pirates game for Bonds and Drabek who left via free agency, signing with the Giants and Astros, respectively.

Until 2008, the Braves were the last team in Major League Baseball to win a seventh game after blowing a 3–1 series lead, and only the fourth of 11 total to do it up to that point. That year, the Tampa Bay Rays won Game 7 of the ALCS after blowing a 3–1 lead to the Boston Red Sox.

== Composite box ==
1992 NLCS (4–3): Atlanta Braves over Pittsburgh Pirates

Team	1	2	3	4	5	6	7	8	9	R	H	E
Atlanta Braves	0	7	0	4	7	2	8	1	5	34	57	2
Pittsburgh Pirates	5	10	2	0	5	4	7	2	0	35	59	5
Total attendance: 374,599 Average attendance: 53,514

== Aftermath ==
=== Atlanta Braves ===
The Braves lost the 1992 World Series to the Toronto Blue Jays in six games. 1992 was the second of five National League pennants for the Braves from 1991 to 1999. After making their second consecutive NLCS in 1992, the Braves made seven of the next nine that followed. In 1993, the Braves again came back from a second half deficit to win their division, but were upset by the Philadelphia Phillies in the NLCS. Atlanta won their first World Series under Bobby Cox in 1995. They lost the 1996 and 1999 World Series to the New York Yankees. In 1997, the Braves fell to Jim Leyland's Marlins in the NLCS and in 1998, they were defeated by the San Diego Padres. After being defeated in the NLDS in 2000, the Braves made it back to the NLCS in 2001 only be defeated by the eventual World Series champion Arizona Diamondbacks. Their most recent NLCS appearance came in 2021, where they defeated the defending World Series champion Los Angeles Dodgers in six games en route to winning the 2021 World Series over the Houston Astros in six games to win their fourth World Series championship.

Francisco Cabrera went 0–1 in the 1992 Series. He played only one more season in the big leagues, accruing 91 plate appearances for the 1993 Braves. He later managed the St. Louis Cardinals' Dominican League affiliate. Bobby Cox eventually retired as Braves manager following the 2010 season, and was elected to the Hall of Fame in 2014. He was joined by his ace from this series, Tom Glavine, who was elected as a player that same year and won 305 games in his career.

=== Pittsburgh Pirates ===
"The Slide" also proved to be the end of the Pirates' stretches of playoff runs after losing three straight NLCS. The Pirates never recovered from their loss to the Braves, going 75–87 in 1993. The Pirates would not have another winning season until 2013; their streak of 20 consecutive losing seasons through 2012 remains an all-time record for major North American professional sports.

Barry Bonds and Doug Drabek played their last games for the team, as both departed in free agency that offseason. Bonds went to the San Francisco Giants, where he played for the remainder of his career and eventually set baseball's all-time single season and career home run record with 73 and 762 respectively. Bonds became eligible for the Hall of Fame in 2013, but has yet to be elected due in part to concerns about his use of performance-enhancing drugs. After years of bad blood with the organization, Bonds was inducted into the Pirates Hall of Fame in 2024. Drabek signed with the Houston Astros and stayed there for four seasons, but did not maintain the consistency that he had in Pittsburgh and eventually retired in 1998. Manager Jim Leyland stayed with the Pirates through the 1996 season, with his team losing 80 or more games three of those four years. He moved on to the Florida Marlins, where his team beat Cox's Braves in the NLCS and went on to win the World Series in 1997. Leyland moved on to manage the Detroit Tigers to two World Series losses in 2006 and 2012 (including 3 straight ALCS appearances from 2011–13) before retiring following the 2013 season.

As of 2026, this is Pittsburgh’s last postseason appearance outside of the divisional round, and this is their most recent postseason appearance as a division champion, as the Pirates hold the longest division title drought in the majors. The only team of the four major North American leagues with a longer division title drought are the NFL’s Cleveland Browns, who last won their division in 1989, three years before Pittsburgh’s last division title. The 1990-1992 Pirates are also the last team to lose three consecutive League Championship Series.
