= 1991 Atlanta Braves season =

Major League Baseball season

1991 Atlanta Braves
- National League champions National League West champions
- League: National League
- Division: West
- Ballpark: Fulton County Stadium
- City: Atlanta
- Record: 94–68 (.580)
- Divisional place: 1st
- Owners: Ted Turner
- General managers: John Schuerholz
- Managers: Bobby Cox
- Television: WTBS; TBS Superstation (Pete Van Wieren, Skip Caray, Don Sutton); SportSouth (Ernie Johnson)
- Radio: WSB (Pete Van Wieren, Skip Caray, Don Sutton, Dave O'Brien)

The 1991 Atlanta Braves season was the 26th in Atlanta and the 121st overall. They became the first team in the National League to go from last place one year to first place the next, doing so after remaining 9.5 games out of first at the All Star break. Coincidentally, the Braves' last-to-first feat was also accomplished by the 1991 Minnesota Twins, the team they would face in the 1991 World Series. The last Major League Baseball team to accomplish this was the 1890 Louisville Colonels of the American Association. The 1991 World Series, which the Braves ultimately lost, has been called the greatest World Series in history by ESPN.

Despite finishing last in the National League West in 1990, the Braves managed to overtake the Los Angeles Dodgers to get the first place in 1991, clinching the division on the penultimate day of the regular season. This was the first of three consecutive division titles won by the Braves.

== Offseason ==
- December 3, 1990: Terry Pendleton was signed as a free agent by the Braves.
- December 5, 1990: Sid Bream was signed as a free agent by the Braves.
- December 7, 1990: Juan Berenguer was signed as a free agent by the Braves.
- January 19, 1991: Jerry Willard was signed as a free agent by the Braves.
- January 30, 1991: Deion Sanders was signed as a free agent by the Braves.
- February 8, 1991: Jim Vatcher was selected off waivers from the Braves by the San Diego Padres.
- March 9, 1991: Randy St. Claire was signed as a free agent by the Braves.

== Regular season ==
- Kent Mercker, Mark Wohlers and Alejandro Pena combined for a no-hitter on September 11, 1991, in a 1–0 shutout win over the San Diego Padres. The 13th no-hitter in franchise history, attendance was 20,477 at Fulton-County Stadium.

=== Opening Day starters ===
- Rafael Belliard
- Sid Bream
- Ron Gant
- Mike Heath
- David Justice
- Terry Pendleton
- Deion Sanders
- John Smoltz
- Jeff Treadway

=== Season standings ===
NL West
Team	W	L	Pct.	GB	Home	Road
Atlanta Braves	94	68	.580	—	48‍–‍33	46‍–‍35
Los Angeles Dodgers	93	69	.574	1	54‍–‍27	39‍–‍42
San Diego Padres	84	78	.519	10	42‍–‍39	42‍–‍39
San Francisco Giants	75	87	.463	19	43‍–‍38	32‍–‍49
Cincinnati Reds	74	88	.457	20	39‍–‍42	35‍–‍46
Houston Astros	65	97	.401	29	37‍–‍44	28‍–‍53

=== Record vs. opponents ===
1991 National League record Sources:
Team	ATL	CHC	CIN	HOU	LAD	MON	NYM	PHI	PIT	SD	SF	STL
Atlanta	—	6–6	11–7	13–5	7–11	5–7	9–3	5–7	9–3	11–7	9–9	9–3
Chicago	6–6	—	4–8	9–3	2–10	10–7	11–6	8–10	7–11	4–8	6–6	10–8
Cincinnati	7–11	8–4	—	9–9	6–12	6–6	5–7	9–3	2–10	8–10	10–8	4–8
Houston	5–13	3–9	9–9	—	8–10	2–10	7–5	7–5	4–8	6–12	9–9	5–7
Los Angeles	11–7	10–2	12–6	10–8	—	5–7	7–5	7–5	7–5	10–8	8–10	6–6
Montreal	7–5	7–10	6–6	10–2	7–5	—	4–14	4–14	6–12	6–6	7–5	7–11
New York	3–9	6–11	7–5	5–7	5–7	14–4	—	11–7	6–12	7–5	6–6	7–11
Philadelphia	7-5	10–8	3–9	5–7	5–7	14–4	7–11	—	6–12	9–3	6–6	6–12
Pittsburgh	3–9	11–7	10–2	8–4	5–7	12–6	12–6	12–6	—	7–5	7–5	11–7
San Diego	7–11	8–4	10–8	12–6	8–10	6–6	5–7	3–9	5–7	—	11–7	9–3
San Francisco	9–9	6–6	8–10	9–9	10–8	5–7	6–6	6–6	5–7	7–11	—	4–8
St. Louis	3–9	8–10	8–4	7–5	6–6	11–7	11–7	12–6	7–11	3–9	8–4	—

=== Notable transactions ===
- April 1, 1991: Jimmy Kremers and a player to be named later were traded by the Braves to the Montreal Expos for Otis Nixon and Boi Rodriguez (minors). The Braves completed the deal by sending Keith Morrison (minors) to the Expos on June 3, 1991.
- May 6, 1991: Kevin Castleberry (minors) was traded by the Braves to the Chicago White Sox for Danny Heep.
- June 14, 1991: Rick Mahler was signed as a free agent by the Braves.
- June 17, 1991: Danny Heep was released by the Braves.
- August 8, 1991: Rick Mahler was released by the Braves.
- August 28, 1991: Tony Castillo and a player to be named later was traded by the Braves to the New York Mets for Alejandro Peña. The Braves completed the deal by sending Joe Roa to the Mets on August 29.
- September 29, 1991: Turk Wendell and Yorkis Pérez were traded by the Braves to the Chicago Cubs for Damon Berryhill and Mike Bielecki.

=== Notable events ===
- July 31, 1991: Two-sport star Deion Sanders helps the Atlanta Braves overcome a 6–2 deficit with a three-run homer in the fifth inning in an 8–6 win over the Pittsburgh Pirates. The next day, Sanders reports to the Atlanta Falcons for training camp, as his NFL contract stipulated.
- September 11, 1991: Kent Mercker, Mark Wohlers, and Alejandro Peña combine to no-hit the San Diego Padres, the seventh no-hitter of 1991. Controversy ensues when Tony Gwynn apparently ends the no-hitter with two outs in the ninth inning but the official scorer rules it an error on Terry Pendleton.
- September 16, 1991: Otis Nixon, the league's leading base stealer, fails a drug test and is suspended for 60 days, consisting of the rest of the 1991 baseball season and the first six weeks of the 1992 season. The Braves lose the first two games without Nixon but rebound to win the National League pennant.

==== Draft picks ====
- June 3, 1991: 1991 Major League Baseball draft
  - Mike Kelly was drafted by the Braves in the 1st round (2nd pick). Player signed July 22, 1991.
  - Jason Schmidt was drafted by the Braves in the 8th round. Player signed June 14, 1991.

=== Roster ===
1991 Atlanta Braves
Roster
Pitchers: 33 Steve Avery; 48 Juan Berenguer; 36 Mike Bielecki; 36 Tony Castillo; 18 Jim Clancy; 40 Marvin Freeman; 47 Tom Glavine; 32 Charlie Leibrandt; 42 Rick Mahler; 50 Kent Mercker; 49 Jeff Parrett; 26 Alejandro Peña; 46 Dan Petry; 42 Armando Reynoso; 43 Doug Sisk; 25 Pete Smith; 29 John Smoltz; 46 Randy St. Claire; 30 Mike Stanton; 43 Mark Wohlers	Catchers: 49 Damon Berryhill; 19 Francisco Cabrera; 8 Mike Heath; 10 Greg Olson; 31 Jerry Willard; Infielders: 11 Mike Bell; 2 Rafael Belliard; 4 Jeff Blauser; 12 Sid Bream; 45 Vinny Castilla; 17 Danny Heep; 14 Brian Hunter; 20 Mark Lemke; 9 Terry Pendleton; 34 Rico Rossy; 15 Jeff Treadway	Outfielders: 5 Ron Gant; 16 Tommy Gregg; 23 David Justice; 17 Keith Mitchell; 1 Otis Nixon; 24 Deion Sanders; 27 Lonnie Smith	Manager: 6 Bobby Cox; Coaches: 26 Jim Beauchamp (bench); 39 Pat Corrales (first base); 38 Clarence Jones (hitting); 54 Leo Mazzone (pitching); 22 Jimy Williams (third base); 52 Ned Yost (bullpen)

== Player stats ==
= Indicates team leader

= Indicates league leader

=== Batting ===
==== Starters by position ====
Note: Pos = Position; G = Games played; AB = At bats; R = Runs; H = Hits; HR = Home runs; RBI = Runs batted in; Avg. = Batting average; SB = Stolen bases

Pos	Player	G	AB	R	H	Avg.	HR	RBI	SB
C	Greg Olson	133	411	46	99	.241	6	44	1
1B	Sid Bream	91	265	32	67	.253	11	45	0
2B	Jeff Treadway	106	306	41	98	.320	3	32	2
3B	Terry Pendleton	153	586	94	187	.319	22	86	10
SS	Rafael Belliard	149	353	36	88	.249	0	27	3
LF	Lonnie Smith	122	353	58	97	.275	7	44	9
CF	Ron Gant	154	561	101	141	.251	32	105	34
RF	David Justice	109	396	67	109	.275	21	87	8

==== Other batters ====
Note: G = Games played; AB = At bats; R = Runs; H = Hits; Avg. = Batting average; HR = Home runs; RBI = Runs batted in; SB = Stolen bases

Player	G	AB	R	H	Avg.	HR	RBI	SB
Otis Nixon	124	401	81	119	.297	0	26	72
Jeff Blauser	129	352	49	91	.259	11	54	5
Brian Hunter	97	271	32	68	.251	12	50	0
Mark Lemke	136	269	36	63	.234	2	23	1
Mike Heath	49	139	4	29	.209	1	12	0
Deion Sanders	54	110	16	21	.191	4	13	11
Tommy Gregg	72	107	13	20	.187	1	4	2
Francisco Cabrera	44	95	7	23	.242	4	23	1
Keith Mitchell	48	66	11	21	.318	2	3	3
Mike Bell	17	30	4	4	.133	1	1	1
Jerry Willard	17	14	1	3	.214	1	4	0
Danny Heep	14	12	4	5	.417	0	3	0
Vinny Castilla	12	5	1	1	.200	0	0	0
Damon Berryhill	1	1	0	0	.000	0	0	0
Rico Rossy	5	1	0	0	.000	0	0	0

=== Pitching ===
==== Starting pitchers ====
Note: G = Games played; IP = Innings pitched; W = Wins; L = Losses; ERA = Earned run average; SO = Strikeouts; BB = Bases on Balls

Player	G	IP	W	L	ERA	SO	BB
Tom Glavine	34	246.2	20	11	2.55	192	69
Charlie Leibrandt	36	229.2	15	13	3.49	128	56
John Smoltz	36	229.2	14	13	3.80	148	77
Steve Avery	35	210.1	18	8	3.38	137	65
Pete Smith	14	48.0	1	3	5.06	29	22
Armando Reynoso	6	23.1	2	1	6.17	10	10

==== Other pitchers ====
Note: G = Games played; IP = Innings pitched; W = Wins; L = Losses; SV = Saves; ERA = Earned run average; SO = Strikeouts; BB = Bases on Balls

Player	G	IP	W	L	SV	ERA	SO	BB
Rick Mahler	13	28.2	1	1	0	5.65	16	12

==== Relief pitchers ====
Note: G = Games played; IP = Innings pitched; W = Wins; L = Losses; SV = Saves; ERA = Earned run average; SO = Strikeouts; BB = Bases on Balls

Player	G	IP	W	L	SV	ERA	SO	BB
Juan Berenguer	49	64.1	0	3	17	2.24	53	20
Mike Stanton	74	78.0	5	5	7	2.88	54	21
Kent Mercker	50	73.1	5	3	6	2.58	62	35
Marvin Freeman	34	48.0	1	0	1	3.00	34	13
Jim Clancy	24	34.2	2	3	3	5.71	17	14
Randy St. Claire	19	28.2	0	0	0	4.08	30	9
Dan Petry	10	24.1	0	0	0	5.55	9	14
Jeff Parrett	18	21.1	1	2	1	6.33	14	12
Mark Wohlers	17	19.2	3	1	2	3.20	13	13
Alejandro Peña	15	19.1	2	0	11	1.40	13	3
Doug Sisk	14	14.1	2	1	0	5.02	5	8
Tony Castillo	7	8.2	1	1	0	7.27	8	5
Mike Bielecki	2	1.2	0	0	0	0.00	3	2

== National League Championship Series ==
Avery's successful season continued with one of the greatest postseason performances of all time. He shut out the Pittsburgh Pirates for 16.2 innings over two games and accumulated two 1-0 wins. His performance earned him MVP honors for the 1991 NLCS.

=== Game 1 ===
October 9: Three Rivers Stadium in Pittsburgh, Pennsylvania

Team	1	2	3	4	5	6	7	8	9	R	H	E
Atlanta	0	0	0	0	0	0	0	0	1	1	5	1
Pittsburgh	1	0	2	0	0	1	0	1	X	5	8	1
W: Doug Drabek (1-0) L: Tom Glavine (0-1) S: Bob Walk (1)
HR: ATL – David Justice (1) PIT – Andy Van Slyke (1)
Pitchers: ATL – Glavine (6), Wohlers (1), Stanton (1) PIT – Drabek (6), Walk (3)
Attendance: 57,347 Time: 2:51

=== Game 2 ===
October 10: Three Rivers Stadium in Pittsburgh, Pennsylvania

Team	1	2	3	4	5	6	7	8	9	R	H	E
Atlanta	0	0	0	0	0	1	0	0	0	1	8	0
Pittsburgh	0	0	0	0	0	0	0	0	0	0	6	0
W: Steve Avery (1-0) L: Zane Smith (0-1) S: Alejandro Peña (1)
HR: ATL – None PIT – None
Pitchers: ATL – Avery (8 1/3), Pena (2/3) PIT – Z. Smith (7), Mason (1), Belinda (1)
Attendance: 57,533 Time: 2:46

=== Game 3 ===
October 12: Atlanta–Fulton County Stadium in Atlanta

Team	1	2	3	4	5	6	7	8	9	R	H	E
Pittsburgh	1	0	0	1	0	0	1	0	0	3	10	2
Atlanta	4	1	1	0	0	0	1	3	X	10	11	0
W: John Smoltz (1-0) L: John Smiley (0-1) S: Alejandro Peña (2)
HR: PIT – None ATL – Greg Olson (1), Ron Gant (1), Sid Bream (1)
Pitchers: PIT – Smiley (2), Landrum (1), Patterson (2), Kipper (2), Rodriguez (1) ATL – Smoltz (6 1/3), Stanton (2/3), Wohlers (1/3), Pena (1 2/3)
Attendance: 50,905 Time: 3:21

=== Game 4 ===
October 13: Atlanta–Fulton County Stadium in Atlanta

Team	1	2	3	4	5	6	7	8	9	10	R	H	E
Pittsburgh	0	1	0	0	1	0	0	0	0	1	3	11	1
Atlanta	2	0	0	0	0	0	0	0	0	0	2	7	1
W: Stan Belinda (1-0) L: Kent Mercker (0-1) S: None
HR: PIT – None ATL – None
Pitchers: PIT – Tomlin (6), Walk (2), Belinda (2) ATL – Leibrant (6 2/3), Clancy (1/3), Stanton (2), Mercker (2/3), Wohlers (1/3)
Attendance: 51,109 Time: 3:43

=== Game 5 ===
October 14: Atlanta–Fulton County Stadium in Atlanta

Team	1	2	3	4	5	6	7	8	9	R	H	E
Pittsburgh	0	0	0	0	1	0	0	0	0	1	6	2
Atlanta	0	0	0	0	0	0	0	0	0	0	9	1
W: Zane Smith (1-1) L: Tom Glavine (0-2) S: Roger Mason (1)
HR: PIT – None ATL – None
Pitchers: PIT – Z. Smith (7 2/3), Mason (1 1/3) ATL – Glavine (8), Pena (1)
Attendance: 51,109 Time: 2:51

=== Game 6 ===
October 16: Three Rivers Stadium in Pittsburgh, Pennsylvania

Team	1	2	3	4	5	6	7	8	9	R	H	E
Atlanta	0	0	0	0	0	0	0	0	1	1	7	0
Pittsburgh	0	0	0	0	0	0	0	0	0	0	4	0
W: Steve Avery (2-0) L: Doug Drabek (1-1) S: Alejandro Peña (3)
HR: ATL – None PIT – None
Pitchers: ATL – Avery (8), Pena (1) PIT – Drabek (9)
Attendance: 54,508 Time: 3:09

=== Game 7 ===
October 17: Three Rivers Stadium in Pittsburgh, Pennsylvania

Team	1	2	3	4	5	6	7	8	9	R	H	E
Atlanta	3	0	0	0	1	0	0	0	0	4	6	1
Pittsburgh	0	0	0	0	0	0	0	0	0	0	6	0
W: John Smoltz (2-0) L: John Smiley (0-2) S: None
HR: ATL – Brian Hunter (1) PIT – None
Pitchers: ATL – Smoltz (9) PIT – Smiley (2/3), Walk (4 1/3), Mason (2), Belinda (2)
Attendance: 46,932 Time: 3:04

== World Series ==
=== Game 1 ===
October 19, 1991, at Hubert H. Humphrey Metrodome in Minneapolis, Minnesota

Team	1	2	3	4	5	6	7	8	9	R	H	E
Atlanta	0	0	0	0	0	1	0	1	0	2	6	1
Minnesota	0	0	1	0	3	1	0	0	X	5	9	1
W: Jack Morris (1-0) L: Charlie Leibrandt (0-1) S: Rick Aguilera (1)
HR: MIN – Greg Gagne (1), Kent Hrbek (1)

=== Game 2 ===
October 20, 1991, at Hubert H. Humphrey Metrodome in Minneapolis, Minnesota

Team	1	2	3	4	5	6	7	8	9	R	H	E
Atlanta	0	1	0	0	1	0	0	0	0	2	8	1
Minnesota	2	0	0	0	0	0	0	1	X	3	4	1
W: Kevin Tapani (1-0) L: Tom Glavine (0-1) S: Rick Aguilera (2)
HR: MIN – Chili Davis (1), Scott Leius (1)

=== Game 3 ===
October 22, 1991, at Atlanta–Fulton County Stadium in Atlanta

Team	1	2	3	4	5	6	7	8	9	10	11	12	R	H	E
Minnesota	1	0	0	0	0	0	1	2	0	0	0	0	4	10	1
Atlanta	0	1	0	1	2	0	0	0	0	0	0	1	5	8	2
W: Jim Clancy (1-0) L: Rick Aguilera (0-1)
HR: MIN – Chili Davis (2), Kirby Puckett (1) ATL – David Justice (1), Lonnie Smith (1)

=== Game 4 ===
October 23, 1991, at Atlanta–Fulton County Stadium in Atlanta

Team	1	2	3	4	5	6	7	8	9	R	H	E
Minnesota	0	1	0	0	0	0	1	0	0	2	7	0
Atlanta	0	0	1	0	0	0	1	0	1	3	8	0
W: Mike Stanton (1-0) L: Mark Guthrie (0-1)
HR: MIN – Mike Pagliarulo (1) ATL – Terry Pendleton (1), Lonnie Smith (2)

=== Game 5 ===
October 24, 1991, at Atlanta–Fulton County Stadium in Atlanta

Team	1	2	3	4	5	6	7	8	9	R	H	E
Minnesota	0	0	0	0	0	3	0	1	1	5	7	1
Atlanta	0	0	0	4	1	0	6	3	X	14	17	1
W: Tom Glavine (1-1) L: Kevin Tapani (1-1)
HR: ATL– David Justice (2), Lonnie Smith (3), Brian Hunter (1)

=== Game 6 ===
October 26, 1991, at Hubert H. Humphrey Metrodome in Minneapolis, Minnesota

Team	1	2	3	4	5	6	7	8	9	10	11	R	H	E
Atlanta	0	0	0	0	2	0	1	0	0	0	0	3	9	1
Minnesota	2	0	0	0	1	0	0	0	0	0	1	4	9	0
W: Rick Aguilera (1-1) L: Charlie Leibrandt (0-2)
HR: ATL– Terry Pendleton (2) MIN– Kirby Puckett (2)

=== Game 7 ===
October 27, 1991, at Hubert H. Humphrey Metrodome in Minneapolis, Minnesota

Team	1	2	3	4	5	6	7	8	9	10	R	H	E
Atlanta	0	0	0	0	0	0	0	0	0	0	0	7	0
Minnesota	0	0	0	0	0	0	0	0	0	1	1	10	0
W: Jack Morris (2-0) L: Alejandro Peña (0-1)

For the first time since 1962, a seventh game of the World Series ended with a 1–0 verdict. It was also the second time in five that the home team won all seven games of a World Series.

== Award winners ==
- Steve Avery, NLCS MVP
- Bobby Cox, Sporting News Manager of the Year Award
- Ron Gant, OF, Silver Slugger
- Tom Glavine, National League Pitcher of the Month, May
- Tom Glavine, National League Cy Young Award
- Tom Glavine, Silver Slugger
- Tom Glavine, The Sporting News Pitcher of the Year Award
- David Justice, National League Player of the Month, May
- Terry Pendleton, National League Most Valuable Player

1991 Major League Baseball All-Star Game

- Tom Glavine, pitcher, starter

=== Team leaders ===
- Home runs – Ron Gant (32)
- Runs batted in – Ron Gant (105)
- Batting average – Terry Pendleton (.319)
- Hits – Terry Pendleton (187)
- Stolen bases – Otis Nixon (72)
- Walks – Otis Nixon (71)
- Wins – Tom Glavine (20)
- Earned run average – Tom Glavine (2.55)
- Strikeouts – Tom Glavine (192)
- Saves – Juan Berenguer (17)

== Farm system ==
Level	Team	League	Manager
AAA	Richmond Braves	International League	Phil Niekro
AA	Greenville Braves	Southern League	Chris Chambliss
A	Durham Bulls	Carolina League	Grady Little
A	Macon Braves	South Atlantic League	Roy Majtyka
Rookie	Pulaski Braves	Appalachian League	Randy Ingle
Rookie	GCL Braves	Gulf Coast League	Jim Saul
Rookie	Idaho Falls Braves	Pioneer League	Steve Curry

LEAGUE CHAMPIONS: Pulaski

== See also ==
- 1991 National League Championship Series
- 1991 World Series
