= Leius =

Leius is a surname. Notable people with the surname include:

- Scott Leius (born 1965), American baseball player
- Toomas Leius (1941–2025), Estonian-Soviet tennis player
