= Junior Ortiz =

Puerto Rican baseball player (born 1959)

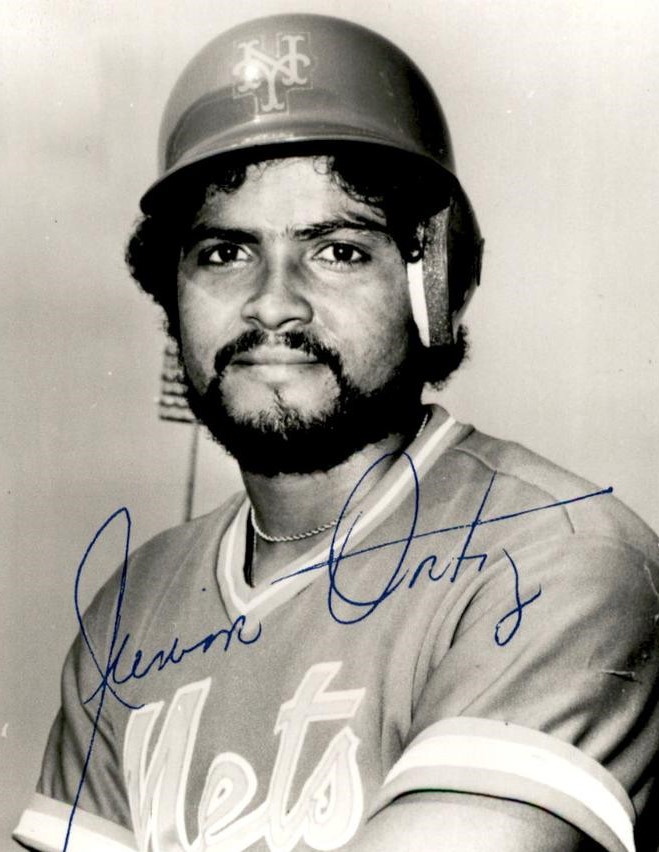
- Catcher
- Born: October 24, 1959 (age 67); Humacao, Puerto Rico
- Batted: Right Threw: Right

MLB debut
- September 20, 1982, for the Pittsburgh Pirates

Last MLB appearance
- August 8, 1994, for the Texas Rangers

MLB statistics
- Batting average: .256
- Home runs: 5
- Runs batted in: 186
- Stats at Baseball Reference

Teams
- Pittsburgh Pirates (1982–1983); New York Mets (1983–1984); Pittsburgh Pirates (1985–1989); Minnesota Twins (1990–1991); Cleveland Indians (1992–1993); Texas Rangers (1994)

Career highlights and awards
- World Series champion (1991)

Adalberto "Junior" Ortiz Colón (born October 24, 1959) is a Puerto Rican former Major League Baseball catcher. He played all or part of thirteen seasons in the majors from 1982 to 1994. He was a member of the 1991 World Champion Minnesota Twins.

Ortiz was a light-hitting catcher with a stutter.

Ortiz was known for having a strong sense of humor.
