= 1991 World Series =

1991 Major League Baseball championship series

Team (Wins)	Managers	Season
Minnesota Twins (4)	Tom Kelly	95–67, .586, GA: 8
Atlanta Braves (3)	Bobby Cox	94–68, .580, GA: 1
- Dates: October 19–27
- Venue(s): Hubert H. Humphrey Metrodome (Minnesota); Fulton County Stadium (Atlanta)
- MVP: Jack Morris (Minnesota)
- Umpires: Don Denkinger (AL), Harry Wendelstedt (NL), Drew Coble (AL), Terry Tata (NL), Rick Reed (AL), Ed Montague (NL)
- Hall of Famers: Twins: Jack Morris; Tony Oliva (coach); Kirby Puckett; Braves: Bobby Cox (manager); John Schuerholz (GM); Tom Glavine; John Smoltz

Broadcast
- Television: CBS
- TV announcers: Jack Buck and Tim McCarver
- Radio: CBS; WSB (ATL); WCCO (MIN)
- Radio announcers: Vin Scully and Johnny Bench (CBS); Skip Caray, Pete Van Wieren, Dave O'Brien and Don Sutton (WSB); Herb Carneal and John Gordon (WCCO)
- ALCS: Minnesota Twins over Toronto Blue Jays (4–1)
- NLCS: Atlanta Braves over Pittsburgh Pirates (4–3)

The 1991 World Series was the championship series of Major League Baseball's (MLB) 1991 season. The 88th edition of the World Series, it was a best-of-seven playoff played between the American League (AL) champion Minnesota Twins and the National League (NL) champion Atlanta Braves. The Twins defeated the Braves four games to three to win the championship, their second in Minnesota and third overall. The series was unique because of the standings of the two participating teams in the previous season: both finished the 1990 season in last place; before 1991, no league champion had ever finished the previous season in last place.

A number of outlets regard the 1991 World Series as one of the greatest ever. In 2003, ESPN selected this championship as the "Greatest of All Time" in their "World Series 100th Anniversary" countdown, with five of its games decided by a single run, four decided in the final at-bat and three going into extra innings. In addition to the suspense of the outcome of many of its games, the Series had other highlights. For example, the series-deciding seventh game was a scoreless tie (0–0) through the regular nine innings, and went into extra innings; Minnesota won 1–0 in the 10th inning, with their starting pitcher, Jack Morris, pitching a complete game. Morris was named the MVP for the series.

With 69 innings in total, the 1991 World Series formerly shared the record for longest seven-game World Series in terms of innings that had been set with the 1924 World Series which, coincidentally, featured the Twins' predecessor, the Senators (the 1912 World Series, which saw one game tied due to darkness, logged the most innings ever, at 75). This record was broken by the 2025 World Series, which lasted 74 innings.

As of 2026, this is Minnesota’s last World Series victory and appearance, their third-most recent victory in a postseason series, as well as the most recent men's professional sports championship won by a Minneapolis-St.Paul-based team.

== Background ==
=== Minnesota Twins ===
Three years after their 1987 World Series championship, the Minnesota Twins went 74–88 in 1990 to finish last in the American League West (29 games behind the Oakland Athletics, the eventual World Series runner-up) for the first time since 1982. However, in 1991, thanks to breakout seasons from pitchers such as Scott Erickson and Kevin Tapani and a Rookie of the Year-winning performance from second baseman Chuck Knoblauch, along with a strong season by newly acquired free agent and future Hall of Famer Jack Morris, the Twins won their division by eight games over the Chicago White Sox. They defeated the Toronto Blue Jays in five games in the American League Championship Series to advance to the Fall Classic. Kirby Puckett batted .429 with two home runs and five RBI to win the ALCS MVP award.

=== Atlanta Braves ===
Following a late-season collapse in 1983, the Atlanta Braves had a string of seven consecutive losing seasons and finished last in the National League West three times in a row from 1988 to 1990. Bobby Cox returned to the Atlanta Braves' dugout as manager in the middle of the 1990 season, replacing Russ Nixon. The Braves would finish the year with the worst record in baseball, at 65–97, and traded Dale Murphy to the Philadelphia Phillies after it was clear he was becoming a less dominant player. Pitching coach Leo Mazzone began developing young pitchers Tom Glavine, Steve Avery, and John Smoltz into future stars.

In 1991, after having a 39–40 record at the All-Star break, the Braves surged in the second half to win the division title on the penultimate day of the season. The Braves won 55 of their final 83 games over the last three months of the season and edging the Los Angeles Dodgers by a single game. Aided by position players David Justice, Ron Gant, unexpected MVP third baseman Terry Pendleton and Cy Young Award winner Tom Glavine, 1991 was the franchise's best season since 1957. They defeated the Pittsburgh Pirates in seven games in the National League Championship Series to win their first National League pennant since 1958. Avery was named the NLCS MVP after pitching two scoreless starts with 17 strikeouts in 16 1/3 innings.

== Summary ==
The 1991 World Series was notable for several grueling contests, with five of its games decided by one run (three of which in extra innings; including the third game, a 12-inning marathon that saw Twins manager Tom Kelly run out of pitchers).

AL Minnesota Twins (4) vs. NL Atlanta Braves (3)

Game	Date	Score	Location	Time	Attendance
1	October 19	Atlanta Braves – 2, Minnesota Twins – 5	Hubert H. Humphrey Metrodome	3:00	55,108
2	October 20	Atlanta Braves – 2, Minnesota Twins – 3	Hubert H. Humphrey Metrodome	2:37	55,145
3	October 22	Minnesota Twins – 4, Atlanta Braves – 5 (12)	Atlanta–Fulton County Stadium	4:04	50,878
4	October 23	Minnesota Twins – 2, Atlanta Braves – 3	Atlanta–Fulton County Stadium	2:57	50,878
5	October 24	Minnesota Twins – 5, Atlanta Braves – 14	Atlanta–Fulton County Stadium	2:59	50,878
6	October 26	Atlanta Braves – 3, Minnesota Twins – 4 (11)	Hubert H. Humphrey Metrodome	3:46	55,155
7	October 27	Atlanta Braves – 0, Minnesota Twins – 1 (10)	Hubert H. Humphrey Metrodome	3:23	55,118

== Matchups ==
=== Game 1 ===
Saturday, October 19, 1991 7:29 pm (CDT) at Hubert H. Humphrey Metrodome in Minneapolis, Minnesota 73 °F (23 °C), dome
Team	1	2	3	4	5	6	7	8	9	R	H	E
Atlanta	0	0	0	0	0	1	0	1	0	2	6	1
Minnesota	0	0	1	0	3	1	0	0	X	5	9	1
WP: Jack Morris (1–0) LP: Charlie Leibrandt (0–1) Sv: Rick Aguilera (1); Home runs: ATL: None; MIN: Greg Gagne (1), Kent Hrbek (1)

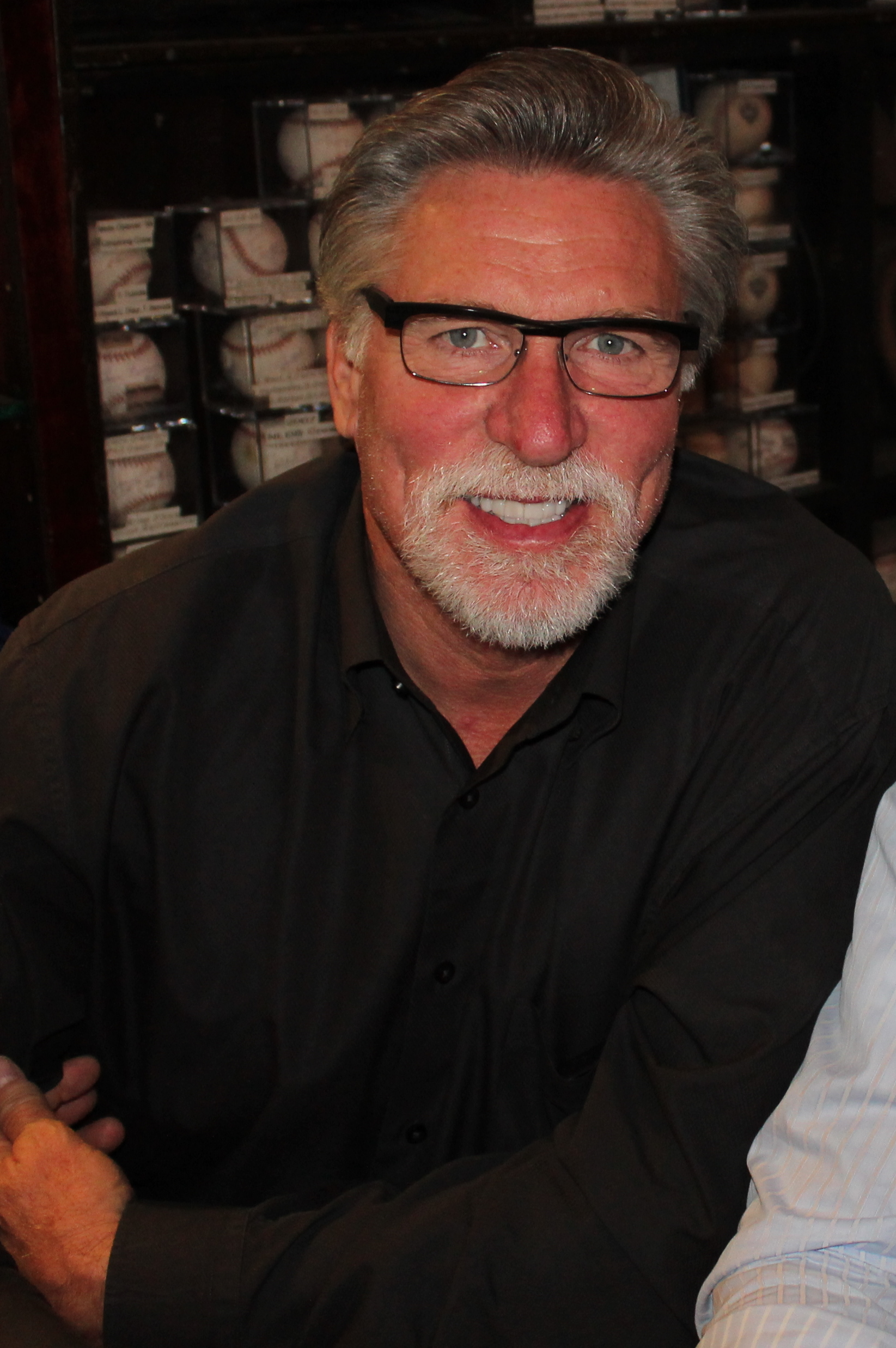
Twins starter Jack Morris, the winning pitcher in Game 1.

The ceremonial first pitch of the series was thrown by retired AL umpire Steve Palermo, who had been forced into early retirement when he was seriously injured by gunshot while coming to the aid of a robbery victim in Dallas on July 7, 1991. After the pitch, the Twins' Al Newman returned the ball to Palermo and the series umpires jogged to the mound to exchange well wishes.

The Twins started their ace, Minnesota native Jack Morris. In his first season with his hometown team, the future Hall of Famer won 18 games, recorded a 3.43 ERA (16th best in the American League), and pitched ten complete games. He was also one of the few starting pitchers in the series on either side with prior experience; seven years earlier, as the ace of the Detroit Tigers, Morris won two games in the 1984 World Series and helped lead Detroit to its most recent world championship. He also had recorded two victories in the ALCS over the Toronto Blue Jays.

The Braves countered with Charlie Leibrandt, the only Brave pitcher with Series exposure. Before joining the Braves in 1990, Leibrandt was a member of the Kansas City Royals for six seasons and had won 17 games for their 1985 World Series champion squad. Thus he was also the only Braves starter who had previously faced several members of the Twins lineup, including Dan Gladden, Kirby Puckett, and Kent Hrbek. In 1991, Leibrandt was 15–13 with a 3.49 ERA. His win total was third on the team behind Tom Glavine and Steve Avery. In the NLCS against the Pittsburgh Pirates, Leibrandt pitched in Game 5 and recorded a no-decision.

Minnesota scored first in the bottom of the third. With two out, leadoff hitter Dan Gladden walked and then stole second. Rookie second baseman Chuck Knoblauch then singled to drive him in, but was caught in a rundown in between first and second and tagged out to end the inning. Manager Tom Kelly later said that he wanted Knoblauch to take the turn around first to draw the throw away from the plate and allow the run to score. The Twins added three more runs in the fifth, as Kent Hrbek led off with a double, Scott Leius singled and shortstop Greg Gagne hit a three-run shot. Leibrandt was pulled from the game after the home run, and reliever Jim Clancy promptly allowed Gladden and Knoblauch to reach base on an error and a walk. Gladden reached third on a fly ball by Kirby Puckett for the first out, and after Knoblauch stole second Chili Davis was put on intentionally. Twins catcher Brian Harper then lifted a fly ball to left field that was caught for the second out. Gladden tagged again and tried to score, running over Atlanta catcher Greg Olson in the process, but Olson held onto the ball for the third out even though Gladden flipped him so hard that he momentarily stood on his head.

The Braves broke through against Morris in the top of the sixth, as Jeff Treadway and David Justice reached base with two out. Ron Gant then followed with a single that Gladden misplayed, which scored Treadway and left runners at second and third. Morris got out of the jam by striking out Sid Bream to end the inning, and the Twins added an insurance run in the bottom of the inning as Hrbek homered off Clancy.

After walking the first two batters to lead off the eighth, Morris was pulled from the game in favor of Mark Guthrie, who induced a double play off the bat of Terry Pendleton. After Guthrie walked Justice, Twins closer Rick Aguilera came into the game and gave up a hit to Gant. The hit drove in Lonnie Smith from third base, and the run was charged to Morris. It was the last run scored, as the Twins won 5–2 with Aguilera picking up the four-out save.

Morris's win was his third World Series win in as many starts, as he won Games 1 and 4 of the 1984 Series. Leibrandt's poor performance resulted in his being removed from the rotation, although he did pitch in Game 6, facing just one batter and giving up the game-winning home run to Puckett.

During the game, a Hrbek pop foul hit Commissioner Fay Vincent's daughter Anne in the head.

=== Game 2 ===
Sunday, October 20, 1991 7:40 pm (CDT) at Hubert H. Humphrey Metrodome in Minneapolis, Minnesota 73 °F (23 °C), dome
Team	1	2	3	4	5	6	7	8	9	R	H	E
Atlanta	0	1	0	0	1	0	0	0	0	2	8	1
Minnesota	2	0	0	0	0	0	0	1	X	3	4	1
WP: Kevin Tapani (1–0) LP: Tom Glavine (0–1) Sv: Rick Aguilera (2); Home runs: ATL: None; MIN: Chili Davis (1), Scott Leius (1)

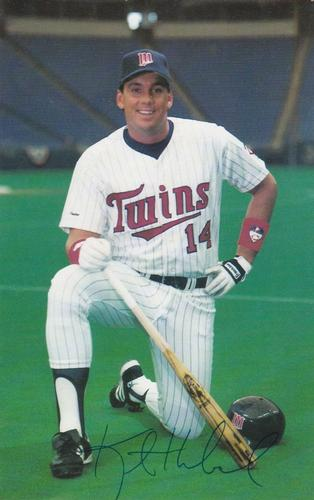
A controversial baserunning play between Twins first baseman Kent Hrbek (above) and the Braves' Ron Gant (below) was the most prominent event of Game 2.

The pitching matchup featured 1991 National League Cy Young Award winner Tom Glavine against the Twins' 16-game winner and number two starter, Kevin Tapani. Tapani had the lowest ERA of the Twins' rotation, 2.99, while Glavine led the Braves in wins with 20. In their respective League Championship Series, Tapani had not pitched particularly well having lost Game 2 and giving up five early runs in Game 5. Glavine lost his NLCS starts in Games 1 and 5, giving up a total of six runs.

Leading off the bottom of the first, Gladden lifted a seemingly routine pop-up toward second base. Atlanta fielders Justice and Mark Lemke miscommunicated and collided, and the ball fell from Lemke's glove. Gladden reached second on a two-base error. After walking Knoblauch, Glavine induced Puckett to ground to third, where Pendleton stepped on the bag to retire Gladden and threw across to Sid Bream to retire Puckett for the double play. But the next batter, Davis, homered off Glavine and gave the Twins an early 2–0 lead.

The Braves got a run back in the top of the second when Justice singled, was doubled to third by Bream, and then scored on a sacrifice fly by Brian Hunter. Controversy occurred the next inning when Lonnie Smith reached first on an error by Scott Leius. With two outs, Gant ripped a single to left. Smith, playing for a record fourth team in World Series play, tried to beat the throw to third from Gladden, which was wild and missed third baseman Leius.

The play was not over, however, as Gant was hung up between first and second as he tried to advance on the errant throw. Tapani, backing up the play, fielded the ball and threw back toward first. Gant tried to get back standing up, but Hrbek fielded the ball just before he got to the base and moved to tag Gant out. Somehow, Hrbek's arm and Gant's leg got tangled and the two players stumbled backward. First base umpire Drew Coble called Gant out on the play, a furious Gant and first base coach Pat Corrales argued, and CBS analyst Tim McCarver agreed, that Hrbek had pulled Gant off of the base. Hrbek claimed after the game that Gant had pushed him, and Gant later said that Hrbek had grabbed his leg and fell backward, taking him with him. Coble would later explain his reasoning behind the call for MLB's official video recap of the series. He said that when Gant had come back toward first, he had come in off-balance and was falling over as Hrbek applied the tag; Coble said that based on that, he determined that Gant's own momentum had caused him to leave the base and called him out after Hrbek kept the tag on him. Tom Kelly said that Gant would not have had a problem if he had slid into the bag. This call was ranked as one of the top ten worst baseball calls by both ESPN and Sports Illustrated. Hrbek became a hated figure in Atlanta, was lustily booed, and even received a death threat. In 2011, the Twins celebrated the 20th anniversary of the controversial play by commissioning a bobblehead doll of Hrbek and Gant entangled, a promotion that proved popular with Twins fans.

The Braves tied the game in the fifth when Olson doubled, advanced to third on a groundout by Lemke, and came home on a sacrifice fly by Rafael Belliard. The game stayed tied into the eighth. In the top half, Belliard got a leadoff hit on a bunt single, and after a sacrifice, Pendleton beat out an infield hit. But Tapani got Gant out on a foul popup and Justice on a fly out to end the threat. Kelly remembered seeing a tape of the game that showed Glavine in disbelief that Atlanta was unable to score, and felt that Glavine's emotions took over. Immediately in the bottom half, the unheralded Leius drilled Glavine's first pitch into the left-field seats for what proved to be the game-winning home run.

Both starting pitchers stayed in the game through eight innings and were quite effective, giving up just five runs combined (three earned). Rick Aguilera earned the save for the Twins, and the Series headed to Atlanta with the Twins leading two games to none.

=== Game 3 ===
Tuesday, October 22, 1991 8:29 pm (EDT) at Atlanta–Fulton County Stadium in Atlanta, Georgia 66 °F (19 °C), partly cloudy
Team	1	2	3	4	5	6	7	8	9	10	11	12	R	H	E
Minnesota	1	0	0	0	0	0	1	2	0	0	0	0	4	10	1
Atlanta	0	1	0	1	2	0	0	0	0	0	0	1	5	8	2
WP: Jim Clancy (1–0) LP: Rick Aguilera (0–1); Home runs: MIN: Kirby Puckett (1), Chili Davis (2); ATL: David Justice (1), Lonnie Smith (1)

The Braves' David Justice scored the winning walk-off run in Game 3, the first of an eventual four combined walk-off wins in the series by both teams.

In what is considered one of the greatest World Series games ever played, the Braves outlasted the Twins in a thrilling 12-inning battle in the first World Series game played in the Deep South. This game matched Minnesota's 20-game winner Scott Erickson against Atlanta's late-season hero Steve Avery. In the NLCS, Avery had not allowed a run to the Pirates in 16 1/3 innings of work, winning Game 2 and Game 6 and garnering series MVP honors. Erickson made one start in the ALCS, taking a no decision in Game 3.

Going into the three games in Atlanta, Twins manager Tom Kelly said that managing without the designated-hitter rule was "right up there with rocket science".

In a play reminiscent of Game 2, Dan Gladden led off the game by reaching on a fielding mistake. He lifted a fly ball toward right-center field where David Justice and Ron Gant both went to catch it, but neither called for the ball and it dropped between them. Gladden reached third standing up, and Chuck Knoblauch subsequently flied out to allow him to score the first run of the game and end Avery's scoreless innings streak.

The Braves got the run back in the second when Greg Olson scored on Rafael Belliard's single. Justice led off the fourth with his first World Series home run, and the Braves led for the first time in the Series, 2–1. In the fifth, the Braves scored again when Lonnie Smith homered. Erickson was pulled from the game after allowing Terry Pendleton and Justice to reach base, on a walk and an error by Knoblauch on a ground ball that should have ended the inning. David West entered the game and walked two consecutive batters, forcing home an unearned run (charged to Erickson) and leaving the bases loaded for Terry Leach, who struck out Mark Lemke to end the inning. With the score 4–1, the Braves looked to close it out. As it turned out, the game was just beginning.

After the run that resulted from the first-inning misplay between Gant and Justice, Avery had been perfect for five innings, recording 15 consecutive outs. But then he seemed to tire a bit. Kirby Puckett homered in the seventh to make it 4–2, one inning after two Twins hits and two other fly outs to the warning track. Atlanta manager Bobby Cox reluctantly sent Avery out for the eighth inning. The first batter he faced was Brian Harper, pinch hitting for his replacement catcher Junior Ortiz (Harper never started games that season when Erickson pitched, as he preferred to pitch to Ortiz). After he reached on an error Avery went to the showers in favor of the Braves' regular-season closer, Alejandro Peña. Peña had been 13 for 13 in save opportunities since joining the Braves in a late-season trade with the Mets, but he had not pitched since the previous Wednesday. Chili Davis, pinch hitting for pitcher Steve Bedrosian, took advantage of this and hit a home run to tie the game.

The game remained tied into extra innings, and a series of substitutions and double switches turned the game on its ear. Kelly exhausted the remaining players on his bench by the eleventh inning, and entering the twelfth he was down to only three remaining players, all pitchers. Of those three, Rick Aguilera was the only one who was available to play; the other two were his other two starters, Jack Morris and Kevin Tapani.

The top of the twelfth began with Mark Wohlers on the mound for the Braves. After he retired Randy Bush on a fly out, Gladden reached on a single. Knoblauch followed with a ground ball to second that would likely have resulted in a double play, but Lemke misplayed it and it rolled between his legs. Gladden was able to advance to third on the error, and with the go-ahead run in scoring position, Braves manager Bobby Cox brought in Kent Mercker to pitch.

While all of this was going on, Aguilera was warming up in the Twins’ bullpen. On the CBS television broadcast, Tim McCarver noted that the pitcher’s spot was due in two batters. Kent Hrbek was the batter, and McCarver theorized that if Mercker retired Hrbek, Cox would elect to walk the on deck hitter, Kirby Puckett, if Knoblauch and Gladden were still on base, and force Kelly to decide to use Aguilera as a pinch hitter for pitcher Mark Guthrie.

On the fourth pitch of the at bat, with Knoblauch running to avoid a potential double play, Hrbek struck out looking. Cox brought in Jim Clancy to pitch to Puckett and, just as McCarver had thought, put him on intentionally to load the bases. With his hand forced, Kelly summoned Aguilera from the bullpen to pinch hit. Aguilera had some previous success as a hitter, and had in fact come up as an infielder, but he had not had any at bats since he played with the New York Mets in 1989. On the third pitch of the at-bat he flied out to deep center field, leaving the bases loaded and the game deadlocked. Kelly said in an interview that if the game had gone on beyond two more innings—Aguilera’s usual limit—since he had used up all his relief pitchers and needed to avoid tiring Aguilera out or throwing his rotation into disarray by using one of his starters in relief, his next step would likely have been to put left fielder Gladden (who had previously made emergency pitching appearances on at least two occasions) on the mound and Aguilera in the outfield.

In the bottom of the 12th, Aguilera remained in the game to pitch and quickly got the first out on one pitch. But then Justice singled to right and after Brian Hunter popped out, Justice stole second on an 0–2 pitch to Olson. With two outs and first base open and the normally light-hitting Lemke on deck, Aguilera, wary of Olson's stealth status as one of the Braves' best clutch hitters (despite an overall average of only .241, he had batted .373 with two outs and runners in scoring position during the season), pitched him very carefully after the stolen base and walked him. Lemke (who had nearly caused a major Twins rally with his fielding error in the top of the inning) now entered the pantheon of World Series heroes by hitting a single to left that enabled Justice to just beat the throw home from Gladden. His score gave the Braves a 5–4 win and cut the Twins' lead in the Series to two games to one. Clancy took the win while Aguilera received the loss.

The game lasted a then record four hours, four minutes, broken in 2005 in Game 3 of the 2005 World Series, which ran five hours, 41 minutes. It was the first of four games in this Series to end with the winning team scoring the deciding run in the ninth inning or later. It was also the first World Series game played in Georgia.

=== Game 4 ===
Wednesday, October 23, 1991 8:26 pm (EDT) at Atlanta–Fulton County Stadium in Atlanta, Georgia 72 °F (22 °C), partly cloudy
Team	1	2	3	4	5	6	7	8	9	R	H	E
Minnesota	0	1	0	0	0	0	1	0	0	2	7	0
Atlanta	0	0	1	0	0	0	1	0	1	3	8	0
WP: Mike Stanton (1–0) LP: Mark Guthrie (0–1); Home runs: MIN: Mike Pagliarulo (1); ATL: Terry Pendleton (1), Lonnie Smith (2)

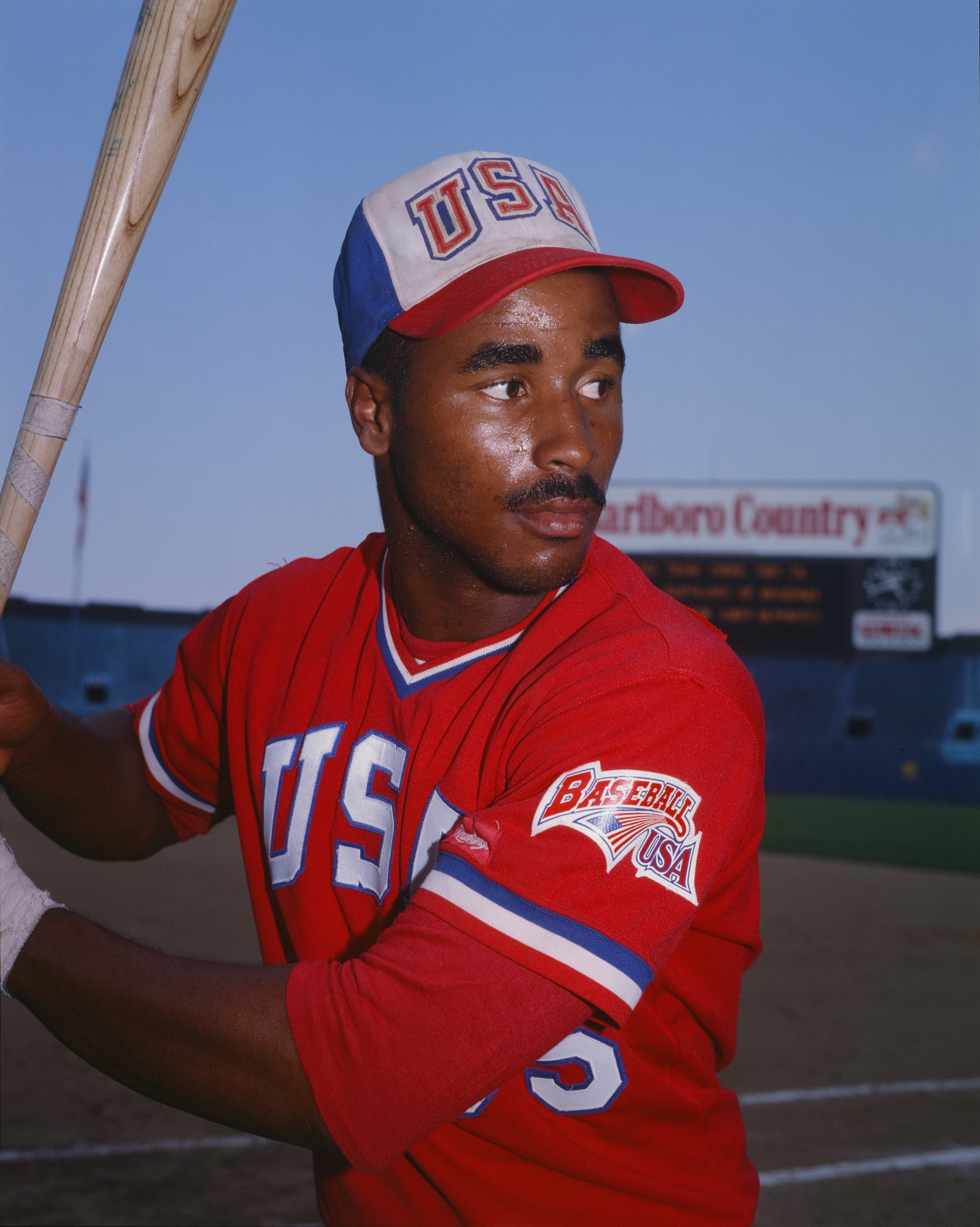
The Braves' second consecutive walk-off win stemmed from a contested play between the Twins' Shane Mack (above) and Atlanta's Mark Lemke (below).

Game 4 matched up Jack Morris against Atlanta starter John Smoltz, a former Detroit prospect and Michigan native who idolized Morris as a youngster when he was pitching for the Tigers. Morris was looking to record his second victory of the series while Smoltz was making his first start. Smoltz had won both of his starts against the Pirates in the NLCS, including in the seventh and deciding game in Pittsburgh where he pitched a complete game shutout.

As was the custom in the first three games, the Twins scored first. In the second inning, Brian Harper scored on Mike Pagliarulo's double. The Braves tied it in the third when Terry Pendleton hit his first postseason home run.

The Braves appeared ready to take a lead in the fifth when Lonnie Smith singled and stole second. Pendleton then followed with a deep fly ball to center field. As Kirby Puckett went back to field it, Smith watched from approximately halfway down the baseline to see where the ball was going to land. Puckett got under the ball and Smith went back to tag up, since the fly ball was deep enough for him to advance to third if Puckett caught it.

As Puckett reached up to try and catch the ball, it nicked the top of his glove and dropped behind him. Since Smith had gone to tag up instead of staying where he had been, he now had to start running from a dead stop and was unable to gain much momentum as the relay throw reached the infield. Smith was waved around third anyway, with the relay reaching Harper on the bounce just before Smith got to the plate. Smith’s only recourse was to try to dislodge the ball from Harper, doing so by throwing himself at Harper and bowling him over. Despite the violent collision, Harper held onto the ball and Smith was out.

With Pendleton on third now and Morris having walked Ron Gant, David Justice stood in. Morris threw a pitch that got past Harper, but he was able to recover and tag Pendleton out as he tried to score. The game remained tied through the sixth.

In the top of the seventh, Pagliarulo homered to give the Twins the lead, 2–1. With a lead and a bullpen that had allowed only one earned run in the entire post-season, the Twins opted to go for more runs by pinch hitting for Morris and removing him after six innings. He had been effective, allowing only the one run, but had a high pitch count. The move backfired as Braves got the run back in the bottom of the inning when Smith made up for his baserunning gaffe and homered off Twins reliever Carl Willis to tie the game.

The game entered the bottom of the ninth still tied at two. With one out and Mark Guthrie pitching, Mark Lemke drilled a triple off the left-center field wall. Jeff Blauser was walked intentionally to set up a possible double play to force extra innings.

With the pitchers’ spot due up after Blauser, Bobby Cox sent Francisco Cabrera to the on-deck circle. Once Blauser was given his intentional walk, Tom Kelly brought in former Brave Steve Bedrosian to pitch. Cabrera, who had been announced as the next batter, was called back to the dugout and veteran minor leaguer Jerry Willard was sent in to pinch hit. Willard hit a short fly ball to Shane Mack in right field. Lemke tagged and broke for the plate as soon as Mack caught the ball. Mack’s throw beat Lemke to the plate, but he slid around Harper’s tag attempt and home plate umpire Terry Tata called him safe despite the objections of both Harper and Bedrosian.

Tim McCarver explained on the CBS broadcast the specific reason Lemke was called safe. Since the play at the plate was not a force play, Harper needed to tag Lemke with the ball, whether it was in his hand or in his glove. While Harper did have the ball in his possession and had made contact with Lemke, he did not do so with his catcher’s mitt—the contact was up his arm near the elbow and thus, Tata ruled that he had missed the tag. It was not uncommon at the time for umpires to call a runner out when the ball beat them to the plate, regardless of the time or location of the tag, but Tata held to the letter of the law. McCarver later narrated the play as "An arm's length; an elbows width: the subtle difference between out...and safe." The win tied the Series at two games apiece and ensured a return to Minnesota.

=== Game 5 ===
Thursday, October 24, 1991 8:26 pm (EDT) at Atlanta–Fulton County Stadium in Atlanta, Georgia 71 °F (22 °C), partly cloudy
Team	1	2	3	4	5	6	7	8	9	R	H	E
Minnesota	0	0	0	0	0	3	0	1	1	5	7	1
Atlanta	0	0	0	4	1	0	6	3	X	14	17	1
WP: Tom Glavine (1–1) LP: Kevin Tapani (1–1); Home runs: MIN: None; ATL: David Justice (2), Lonnie Smith (3), Brian Hunter (1)

Atlanta's Lonnie Smith hit his third home run of the series in Game 5, the most of any player during the series.

In Game 5, Tom Glavine faced Kevin Tapani in a Game 2 rematch. Unlike the previous game, neither pitcher had his best stuff this time around, with Tapani falling apart in the 4th and Glavine in the 6th. Whereas in their first matchup the game was relatively close, Game 5 would be the biggest offensive outburst of the series for either team. But despite the score, the game was kept close until after the 7th inning stretch.

For three innings, the pitchers matched zeroes. In the fourth, Ron Gant singled to left and David Justice homered off the top of the left-field wall for a 2–0 Braves lead. Sid Bream followed up with a walk, and Greg Olson then hit what appeared to be a double play grounder to second. But the ball hit Bream's leg, resulting in Bream being called out for runner interference and Olson safe at first. Mark Lemke, the hero of Games 3 and 4, drilled a triple that scored Olson, and then scored on a double by Rafael Belliard At this point, the Braves led 4–0, their biggest lead in any game in the Series.

In the fifth, Terry Pendleton and Gant singled, with Pendleton moving to third. Then Justice hit into a fielder's choice that scored Pendleton and gave the Braves a 5–0 lead. With Glavine working on a two-hitter, the game seemed in hand for the Braves. But Glavine's control deserted him in the sixth inning and he was pulled from the game. Chuck Knoblauch reached on a one-out walk and then went to third on a single by Kirby Puckett. A walk to Chili Davis loaded the bases, and Glavine suddenly had difficulty finding the strike zone. He gave up two runs on bases-loaded walks to Brian Harper and Scott Leius. Kent Mercker came on to get out of the jam and got the last two outs with one additional run scoring. The game entered the seventh with the Braves leading 5–3.

Minnesota sent David West out to begin the bottom of the seventh. West had failed to retire a batter in Game 3, facing two batters and giving up two walks (while one of these walks did force a run home, this run was an unearned run charged to starter Scott Erickson). Lonnie Smith hit his third home run in three nights to give the Braves a 6–3 lead. And then the floodgates opened. Pendleton and Gant walked, Justice singled to score Pendleton, and West was again taken out without retiring a batter; in this game, he was charged with four earned runs without retiring a batter, for an infinite ERA (West retired his first World Series hitter in the 1993 World Series with the Philadelphia Phillies). Brian Hunter singled to score Gant and put two on with nobody out and an 8–3 Braves lead. After Olson popped out, Lemke hit his third triple in his last four at bats, driving home Justice and Hunter, and scoring when Belliard singled to center. The Braves ended the seventh with an 11–3 lead and the announcers began talking about the teams' chances in Game 6.

But there were still two innings left. Davis, playing this game in right field in place of Mack, who was 0–for–15, singled. He moved to second on a ground out and scored on Al Newman's triple. In the bottom of the eighth, Pendleton doubled and Gant tripled, scoring Pendleton. Justice grounded out to the pitcher, scoring Gant, and Hunter then ended the Braves' offensive barrage with a home run.

Both managers emptied their benches to give playing time to non-starters. Randy St. Claire gave up a run when Gladden tripled (the fifth triple of the game) and scored on a fielder's choice by Junior Ortiz, but the game ended in a 14–5 Braves rout, the Series' only lopsided game. The Braves scored just under half their total runs for the series in these eight innings. They now had their first lead in Series games, three to two. The marquee wall at Atlanta–Fulton County Stadium read "Three at home and one at the Dome." The Washington/Minnesota franchise had now lost 14 straight World Series road games dating to 1925, a streak that remains active as the Twins have not advanced to a World Series since 1991.

=== Game 6 ===
Saturday, October 26, 1991 7:26 pm (CDT) at Hubert H. Humphrey Metrodome in Minneapolis, Minnesota 73 °F (23 °C), dome
Team	1	2	3	4	5	6	7	8	9	10	11	R	H	E
Atlanta	0	0	0	0	2	0	1	0	0	0	0	3	9	1
Minnesota	2	0	0	0	1	0	0	0	0	0	1	4	9	0
WP: Rick Aguilera (1–1) LP: Charlie Leibrandt (0–2); Home runs: ATL: Terry Pendleton (2); MIN: Kirby Puckett (2)

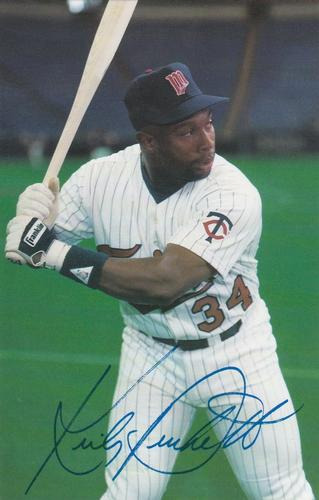
Kirby Puckett's walk-off home run in Game 6 helped the Twins force a decisive Game 7.

The Twins returned to the Metrodome, where they had a 9–1 postseason record (including 6–0 in the World Series). After the reshuffling of the Braves' rotation following Game 1, Steve Avery started for Atlanta on three days' rest. The Twins kept their three-man rotation, with Scott Erickson, who had been batted around in Game 3, getting the start for Minnesota.

In the top of the first, the Braves got two runners on, but stranded them. In the bottom of the first, Chuck Knoblauch singled with one out and then Kirby Puckett strode to the plate looking to break out of the slump he had been in for most of the series. He tripled to left field, scoring Knoblauch, his first big play of the game.

After retiring Chili Davis for the second out of the inning, Avery faced another slump-ridden batter in Shane Mack, who was hitless so far in the series. Mack hit a broken-bat single to score Puckett. Scott Leius followed with a single, advancing Mack to third, but Avery escaped further damage by retiring Kent Hrbek to keep the game at 2-0.

In the top of the third, the Braves hit Erickson hard, but failed to score. After Terry Pendleton reached with one out, Ron Gant drove a pitch deep to left field. Puckett, giving chase, tracked the ball down and then leaped to snare it before it could hit the 13-foot Plexiglas barrier over the left field wall. Pendleton, who had reached second and was trying to advance to third, was forced to turn around and barely beat Puckett’s throw back to first.

In the fourth, the Twins appeared ready to increase their lead, putting runners at second and third with one out. But Avery buckled down and retired the side to keep the game close. Another critical play occurred in the fifth when Rafael Belliard kept the Twins from completing a double play with a fierce slide. His hustle enabled Lonnie Smith to reach first. This became important when Pendleton golfed Erickson's next pitch into the seats, his second World Series home run, to tie the game at two. With two outs, Justice lifted what appeared to be a go-ahead home run for the Braves to right, but at the last instant, the ball hooked foul by about two feet. Erickson retired Justice and the Twins came to bat with the score tied.

Dan Gladden responded with a walk and a steal of second. He moved to third on Knoblauch's lineout to right and scored on Puckett's center field sacrifice fly. The Twins led 3–2. Avery was relieved after the inning. The Twins kept their one-run lead into the seventh. Mark Lemke singled to center, knocking Erickson out of the game, and went to second on a wild pitch by reliever Mark Guthrie. After a strikeout, Smith walked and Pendleton reached on an infield single. The Braves now had the bases loaded and one out as CBS commentator Jack Buck said the Series was now on the line. Gant hit what seemed to be a sure double play ground ball off Carl Willis. The ground ball retired Pendleton, but the speedy Gant beat the relay to first and Lemke scored the tying run, charged to Erickson. Willis got out of the jam by striking out Justice to end the inning with the score tied at three. Willis was charged with a blown save, but he pitched two more scoreless innings, the eighth and ninth. Atlanta kept the Twins off the scoreboard, with left-handed specialist Mike Stanton pitching the seventh and eighth innings and struggling closer Alejandro Peña pitching the ninth and tenth innings.

The game remained tied at three until the 11th. Bobby Cox sent Game 1 starter Charlie Leibrandt in a highly unfamiliar role – as a reliever late in the extra-inning game, and very late at night to the mound to face Puckett. Cox endured some criticism for the move because the Braves still had several relievers at their disposal including left-hander Kent Mercker and right-handers Jim Clancy and Mark Wohlers, but the move made sense on another level, because Leibrandt was the only pitcher left on their roster who had previous World Series experience, and although Leibrandt had been subpar in his Game 1 start and earned the loss, having given up four runs in four innings pitched, the three hitters scheduled to bat for the Twins in the 11th consisted of Puckett, Davis, and Mack, who had been a combined 0 for 6 against Leibrandt in that game, including two strikeouts of Puckett.

Puckett recalled telling Davis that he planned to bunt for a base hit, to which Davis responded, "Bunt my ass. Hit it out and let's go home!" Puckett replied that he would take a few pitches first—a rare move for him, as he was known as a free swinger who often went after the first pitch. After uncharacteristically taking change-up for a strike and two balls (a similar high and outside fastball and then another fastball for ball two) from Leibrandt, Puckett launched the next pitch into the left-center-field seats for a dramatic game-winning home run that tied the Series at three games apiece. Only after he saw first base coach Wayne Terwilliger throw up his hands in victory did Puckett realize he had hit a home run. CBS play–by–play announcer Jack Buck famously called the home run with the line "And we'll see you tomorrow night!"

Puckett's home run forced the first Game 7 since the 1987 World Series, which was also played at the Metrodome. With his walk-off home run, he completed the game a double shy of hitting for the cycle. The home run was also Puckett's only walk-off home run of his career.

This dramatic game has been widely remembered as the high point in Puckett's career. The images of Puckett rounding the bases, arms raised in triumph, are frequently included in video highlights of his career. This moment is captured in a statue of Puckett just outside Gate 34 at the Twins' new home, Target Field. The statue is of Puckett rounding second base, pumping his fists after hitting the dramatic walk-off home run.

After Game 6, the Twins replaced the blue seat back and bottom as well as Puckett's #34 on the seat, where the walk-off home run ball was caught with a gold-colored set. It remained until the final Minnesota Vikings game of 2013 in the Metrodome when, as local media reported, a fan took the #34 plate off the seat. Both of these sets remain in the Twins' archives. The original home run seat armrests and hardware, as well as the replacement blue seat back and bottom, are now in a private collection of Puckett memorabilia in Minnesota after the Metrodome was torn down.

Aguilera took the decision for the Twins after pitching the 10th and 11th innings, while Leibrandt earned his second loss of the series. He took it hard. Normally known as one of the friendliest and most cordial Braves, a despondent Leibrandt refused to answer questions from reporters after the game. He also lost Game 6 of the 1992 World Series by allowing an extra-base hit to the Blue Jays' (coincidentally Minnesota native) Dave Winfield for the eventual game- and series-winning runs, but was significantly more philosophical about that misfortune, saying, "I was devastated last year. I'm down right now, but I'll get over it."

=== Game 7 ===
Sunday, October 27, 1991 7:40 pm (CST) at Hubert H. Humphrey Metrodome in Minneapolis, Minnesota 73 °F (23 °C), dome
Team	1	2	3	4	5	6	7	8	9	10	R	H	E
Atlanta	0	0	0	0	0	0	0	0	0	0	0	7	0
Minnesota	0	0	0	0	0	0	0	0	0	1	1	10	0
WP: Jack Morris (2–0) LP: Alejandro Peña (0–1)

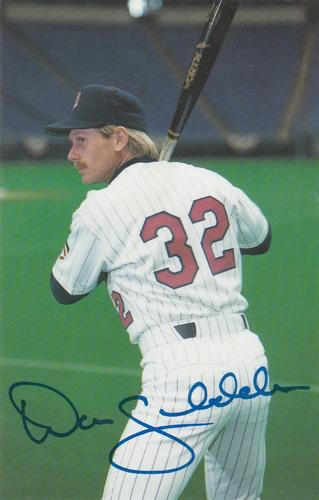
Dan Gladden plated home to score the game and series-winning run for the Twins.

Game 7 saw a rematch of the Game 4 starters. Jack Morris returned to the mound for his third start of the Series while John Smoltz made his second for the Braves. Going into the game, this Series had been regarded as one of the greatest ever. Game 7 reinforced that point. A symbolic moment for this Series occurred on the first at-bat when Braves leadoff hitter Lonnie Smith shook hands with Twins catcher Brian Harper just before stepping up to the plate. This was seen as a gesture of the respect the teams had for each other, though Morris later admitted that in the competitive heat of the moment he had not been happy with his catcher about it, even though Smith extended his hand initially.

The Twins were the first team to get a runner in scoring position, as singles by Brian Harper and Shane Mack with two out set Mike Pagliarulo up with a chance to drive in a run. Smoltz got him to ground out, however, and nothing came of the opportunity. The Braves were then able to get two baserunners of their own in their next at bat, as a single by Rafael Belliard, a passed ball, and a walk to Smith put runners on with only one out in the top of the third inning. Morris retired Terry Pendleton and Ron Gant to end the threat. The Twins would get a runner to third the next inning, as Dan Gladden doubled and advanced to third on a line out by Chuck Knoblauch, but Smoltz struck Kirby Puckett out to keep the score at zero.

The Braves had another chance in their half of the fifth, as Mark Lemke recorded a single. Belliard followed by laying down a sacrifice bunt to advance him, and Smith beat out a drag bunt attempt to put runners on the corners with only one out. Morris, as he had before, managed to get out of trouble by getting Pendleton to pop up for the second out and striking Gant out to end the inning. Neither team would mount a threat again for several innings, with Gladden and Puckett the only players to reach base.

The Braves started their half of the eighth with a Smith single. Pendleton stood in next and on a 1-2 pitch, he swung and, according to Morris, missed the next pitch. Pendleton appealed, maintaining he had foul tipped the ball; umpire Terry Tata ruled that had been the case and the at bat continued. What followed turned out to be the turning point for the Braves in the series.

Braves manager Bobby Cox was aggressive, calling for a hit and run. Pendleton executed his part with a deep fly to center field. Smith rounded second, but then momentarily stopped running. Knoblauch and his fellow middle infielder Greg Gagne had set up a decoy system designed to confuse the baserunner, feigning going for a double play. Smith, meanwhile, maintained that he did not fall for the decoy but instead lost sight of the ball. Regardless of what really happened, Smith could have easily scored had he simply kept running, but only reached third, while Pendleton reached second on a double.

Ron Gant followed with a groundout to Kent Hrbek at first for the first out. The next batter was David Justice, and Tom Kelly emerged from the dugout to talk to his ace. Morris was not pleased to see his manager, as he thought that he was coming to the mound to remove him from the game. Instead, he was there to discuss strategy. Justice was a significant enough power threat that Kelly thought of intentionally walking Justice and pitching instead to Sid Bream, who had been struggling throughout the series with only three hits.

Morris agreed with Kelly, and Justice was walked to load the bases for Bream. This proved to be the last in the series of events that ended up costing the Braves, as Morris induced a ground ball up the first base line. First baseman Kent Hrbek threw home to retire Smith, whose gaffe had set the series in motion. Harper then fired back to Hrbek to retire Bream, who had been playing with chronic knee injuries (five previous surgeries and playing with a large brace on one knee still) and as a result was regarded as one of the slowest baserunners in the league. The rare 3-2-3 double play ended the inning, and the Braves did not have a runner reach base for the remainder of the game.

In the bottom of the eighth, Randy Bush pinch-hit for Gagne to lead off for the Twins, and singled off Smoltz, then was removed in favor of the faster Al Newman to pinch-run. Smoltz then retired Gladden but gave up a single to Knoblauch, his eighth hit of the Series. With one out, runners on the corners, and Puckett coming to the plate, Cox elected to remove Smoltz from the game.

Mike Stanton entered and was ordered to intentionally walk Puckett to load the bases—an unusual decision as managers usually only issue intentional walks when first base is open, not in circumstances where the walk will advance a runner into scoring position. But in this case, the next batter was Hrbek, who, though normally a power threat, had not had a hit since Game 3, and whom Stanton had struck out three times in a row (a reason the Braves used Stanton, a left-handed specialist). This time, Stanton got Hrbek to hit a relatively soft line drive to Lemke, who then stepped on second to double-up Knoblauch. The game continued with no score.

The Braves went down in order in the top of the ninth, as Morris retired Brian Hunter, Greg Olson, and Lemke. The Twins, with a chance to win the game in their final at-bat, led off with a Chili Davis single. After Jarvis Brown came in to run for Davis, Harper attempted to move him over with a bunt down the first base line. Stanton misstepped coming to play the bunt, allowing Harper to reach base without a play. To make matters worse for Atlanta, Stanton's misstep caused him to strain a muscle in his back, and he had to be removed from the game. Cox was forced to bring in Alejandro Peña to pitch to Shane Mack. Despite his earlier struggles, Peña induced a ground ball double play from Mack to record the first two outs. He then gave Mike Pagliarulo an intentional walk and struck out pinch hitter Paul Sorrento for the last out, marking the third time in the series that a game would be decided in extra innings.

Refusing to come out of the game, Morris pitched the top of the tenth. A Twin Cities sportswriter wrote that on that night, "[Morris] could have outlasted Methuselah." He successfully rebuffed several attempts by Kelly to remove him during the game, and was supported by pitching coach Dick Such. Confronted with Morris's insistence on pitching the 10th, Kelly is purported to have said, "Oh hell. It's only a game." And as he had been for most of the night, Morris was effective, retiring Jeff Blauser, Smith, and Pendleton in order. Morris threw 126 pitches in the game. Smoltz later said that if he had had the experience Morris had at the time, he might also have tried to argue his way out of being removed from the game when he got in trouble in the 8th, but as a young and fairly inexperienced pitcher, he didn't feel he had the standing to argue with Cox the way Morris did with Kelly.

Peña faced Gladden to start the bottom half of the inning, and the Twins' leadoff hitter lifted a fly ball to left field while breaking his bat on impact. The ball landed in front of the charging Hunter for a bloop hit, and the ball then took a high bounce that Hunter was unable to field. Center fielder Gant backed up the play and caught the hop, but Gladden dashed to second and beat Gant's throw to the bag. Kelly then called for a sacrifice bunt, and Knoblauch executed to put the winning run on third with one out. As he'd done in the eighth, Cox called for an intentional walk to the resurgent Puckett. Hrbek, who had not gotten a hit in his last 16 at-bats dating back to his single in the eighth inning of Game 3, was next up. Despite Hrbek's .115 Series average (3 hits in the Series, two of which were in Game 1) and lack of speed, and even though the Braves had left-hander Kent Mercker, who had struck Hrbek out in a similar situation earlier in the series, warming up in the bullpen along with right-hander Jim Clancy, Cox decided to call a second consecutive intentional walk, loading the bases to set up a force play at home plate and the possibility of a double play, which would have ended the inning.

This left Kelly with a tough decision. Brown, who pinch ran for designated hitter Davis, was due up and he had not recorded a hit in the series. Entering the 10th inning, Kelly had already used four of the seven players on his bench (Bush, Newman, Brown, and Sorrento). Then in the top half of the inning, he had inserted Scott Leius, normally a third baseman, into the game at shortstop in place of pinch hitter Sorrento. This left Kelly with backup catcher Junior Ortiz—a weak hitter whom he would need if the game continued and something happened to Harper and who he would often use as a late-game defensive replacement as he was a better defensive catcher than Harper—and utility man Gene Larkin, who was playing with an injured knee but had gotten one hit in three previous series plate appearances.

Since he would not have needed to play him in the field, as he would have filled the designated hitter role if the game advanced beyond the tenth, Kelly decided to send Larkin to the plate. On the first pitch he saw, Larkin drove a single into deep left-center over the drawn-in outfield, scoring Gladden with the series-winning run and giving the Twins their second world championship since moving to Minnesota. Morris was the first player to embrace Gladden at the plate, followed by others. At the same time, Larkin was mobbed at first base. The two jubilant groups eventually merged in the middle of the diamond. The victorious players were soon joined by their families on the field, including Morris's two sons. Later, the Twins players did a victory lap around the perimeter of the Metrodome.

The seventh game of the 1991 World Series has since been widely regarded as one of the greatest games in the history of professional baseball. Jack Morris and his 10-inning shutout, has also since been viewed by many baseball historians as one of the greatest pitching performances in a seventh game of the World Series.

For the first time since 1962, a seventh game of the World Series ended 1–0. It was also the first World Series-deciding game to go into extra innings since Game 4 of the 1939 Series. This World Series was also the first to end with an extra-inning Game 7 since 1924, when the home team, the Washington Senators (who became the Twins in 1961), won it in their last at-bat. The same thing happened in the 1997 World Series, when the Florida Marlins beat the Cleveland Indians in the 11th inning of Game 7. (Game 7 of the 2016 World Series also went to extra innings, when the visiting Chicago Cubs defeated the Cleveland Indians in 10 innings. Game 7 of the 2025 World Series also went to extra innings, when the visiting Los Angeles Dodgers defeated the Toronto Blue Jays in 11 innings.) This game set a World Series record for the longest scoreless tie in Game 7. Only one other World Series game went longer without a run, Game 6 of the 1956 World Series, which went to two outs in the bottom of the 10th before the winning run scored.

The 1991 World Series was the second in five seasons where the home team won all seven games. The previous time was in 1987, which the Twins won against the St. Louis Cardinals. It happened again in the 2001 World Series when the Arizona Diamondbacks won Game 7 with a walk-off bloop hit. Game 7 of this series was the last World Series game played at the Metrodome before the Twins moved out at the end of the 2009 season, and the last postseason game played there until 2002, when the Twins lost the ALCS to the Angels.

== Composite line score ==
1991 World Series (4–3): Minnesota Twins (A.L.) over Atlanta Braves (N.L.)

Team	1	2	3	4	5	6	7	8	9	10	11	12	R	H	E
Minnesota Twins	5	1	1	0	4	4	2	4	1	1	1	0	24	56	4
Atlanta Braves	0	2	1	5	6	1	8	4	1	0	0	1	29	63	6
Total attendance: 373,160 Average attendance: 53,309; Winning player's share: $119,580 Losing player's share: $73,323

== Aftermath ==
Seven Twins players appeared in both the 1987 and 1991 Series, playing for the Twins both times: Kirby Puckett, Kent Hrbek, Greg Gagne, Dan Gladden, Gene Larkin, Randy Bush and Al Newman. In addition, the Braves' Terry Pendleton also played in the 1987 Series, as a Cardinal. The home team did not win every game in a World Series again until the 2001 World Series between the Arizona Diamondbacks and the New York Yankees.

After the Twins' triumph, the 1993 Phillies, 1998 Padres, 2007 Rockies 2008 Rays, and the 2025 Blue Jays followed previous seasons' last-place finishes with a World Series appearance, but fell short. But the 2013 Red Sox joined the 1991 Twins as the only other team to win the World Series a year after finishing in last place.

After Game 7, CBS Sports analyst Tim McCarver consoled Atlanta fans by stating that this was an excellent team and that he expected they would "be around" for some time to come. In fact, the Braves won an unprecedented 14 consecutive division titles (three as members of the NL West, and the last 11 in the East), not counting the strike-aborted 1994 season. In 1992 in particular, the Braves returned to the NLCS and once again defeated the Pirates in seven games, culminating in a dramatic game seven win. Francisco Cabrera's two-out single that scored David Justice and Sid Bream capped a three-run rally in the bottom of the ninth inning that gave the Braves a 3–2 victory. It was the first time in post-season history that the tying and winning runs had scored on a single play in the ninth inning. That World Series, however, the Braves lost in six games to the Toronto Blue Jays. The Braves made three more trips to the World Series before the decade ended, defeating the Cleveland Indians in 1995 and losing in 1996 and 1999 to the Yankees.

As previously mentioned, Charlie Leibrandt again had the opportunity to play in the World Series with the Braves in 1992. In the final game, in circumstances eerily similar to Game 6 of the prior year's Series, Leibrandt was called in as a reliever in an extra-inning game. Just as in 1991, Bobby Cox was criticized for using Leibrandt as a reliever with closer Jeff Reardon and relievers Marvin Freeman and David Nied still available. Toronto rallied for two runs in the top of the 11th on a hit by Dave Winfield. The Braves did manage to get one of those runs back in the bottom of the 11th; however, it was not enough and Leibrandt ended up as the losing pitcher.

The Twins contended for the 1992 American League Western Division title for much of the season but finished six games behind the Oakland Athletics, who won the division for the fourth time in five seasons. The Twins' 90–72 record was their last winning campaign until 2001, Kelly's last season as manager. Kelly spent the remainder of his managerial career attempting to rebuild the Twins, who went 71–91 in 1993, 50–63 in 1994, 56–88 in 1995, 78–84 in 1996, 68–94 in 1997, 70–92 in 1998, 63–97 in 1999, and 69–93 in 2000. Over the next several seasons, the players that made up the core of the 1987 and 1991 Twins slowly began to leave. Gladden, the left fielder, departed in the offseason for Detroit, where he played two more years before finishing his career in Japan's NPB for 1994, where he won his third championship. Morris, the pitching hero of the series, signed with Toronto and returned to the World Series the next year. Gagne and Davis departed after the 1992 season and Harper at the end of the 1993 season. Hrbek's production began falling due to injuries that kept him off the field for much of the next two seasons, and he retired in 1994.

The Twins traded away both Erickson and Tapani (neither ever regained his 1991 form) in 1995, and Puckett retired due to a loss of vision in his right eye caused by glaucoma. Though the Twins didn't make it to the postseason for the rest of Puckett's career, he remained an elite player. In 1994, Puckett was switched to right field and won his first league RBI title by driving in 112 runs in only 108 games; a pace that projects to 168 RBIs over a full season. But the 1994 season was cut short by a players' strike. Puckett retired as the Twins' all-time leader in career hits, runs, doubles, and total bases. At the time of his retirement, his .318 career batting average was the highest by any right-handed American League batter since Joe DiMaggio. Puckett was the fourth baseball player during the 20th century to record 1,000 hits in his first five full calendar years in Major League Baseball, and was the second to record 2,000 hits during his first ten full calendar years. He was elected to the Baseball Hall of Fame in 2001, his first year of eligibility.

Knoblauch was the last hitter of the 1991 team to remain in Minnesota, eventually forcing a trade after the 1997 season to the Yankees, with whom he won three additional World Series titles. After being traded to the playoff-bound Red Sox in 1995, Aguilera returned to the Twins in 1996, used by Kelly as a starter. Aguilera returned to the pen in 1997, and stayed until midway through the 1999 season, the last remaining player from the 1991 team. Traded to the Cubs, he finished his career with Chicago that season.

This was the last World Series that Fay Vincent presided over as commissioner, as the owners forced him to resign near the end of the 1992 season.

The Twins and Braves have met seven times in interleague play since the 1991 World Series. In 2002, the Braves finally experienced a Metrodome win by taking two games from the Twins in a three-game series; the Twins swept a three-game series from the Braves at the Metrodome in 2007. The Braves ultimately finished with an all-time record of 2–8 in the stadium before it closed as a baseball venue in 2009. In 2010, the teams played a three-game series at the new Target Field, where the Braves won two out of three games. After the 1991 Series, the Twins did not play in Atlanta again until 2011 for two preseason exhibition games at Turner Field. The Braves and Twins split the series 1–1. Then, as part of the new season-long interleague schedule, the Twins played their first regular-season series against the Braves at Turner Field in May 2013; the Braves swept the three-game set. In 2016, the teams met twice. A two-game series at Target Field was swept by the visiting Braves in July, while the Twins won two games at Turner Field in August. In their most recent series in 2019, the Braves won two out of three games in Minnesota. Starting in 2023, both teams would play a single three-game series annually, with the Twins visiting Truist Park for the first time from June 26–28.

To date, this is the most recent appearance (and win) by a Minnesota-based Big Four team in the final round of its sport. In addition to the 2002 Twins reaching the ALCS before falling to the Anaheim Angels in five games, the closest a Minnesota-based team has come to reaching the final round of its sport since the 1991 World Series were the NFL's Minnesota Vikings reaching the NFC Championship Game in 1998, 2000, 2009, and 2017, the NHL's Minnesota Wild reaching the Stanley Cup Western Conference Final in 2003, and the NBA's Minnesota Timberwolves reaching the Western Conference Finals in 2004, 2024 and 2025.

== Broadcasting ==
CBS covered the World Series on television for the second consecutive year. CBS's primary baseball commentary team of Jack Buck and Tim McCarver led the coverage, with Jim Kaat reporting from the field as well as presiding over the presentation of the World Series Trophy to the Twins at the conclusion of the series. This was Buck's ninth consecutive World Series as the lead announcer, as he had been the lead radio voice of the Fall Classic from 1983 until 1989. McCarver was working his fifth World Series as an analyst, having worked the 1985, 1987, and 1989 series for ABC and the previous year for CBS.

In addition to Kaat, CBS employed dugout level reporters with Lesley Visser assigned to the Twins and Andrea Joyce assigned to the Braves. Pat O'Brien was the host for the pregame and postgame shows that followed each broadcast.

CBS Radio, as it had since 1976, provided nationwide radio coverage of the World Series. Vin Scully, who had rejoined the network in 1990 following his departure from NBC, called his sixth World Series for CBS. Johnny Bench served as the lead analyst for a third consecutive year, and John Rooney hosted the pregame and postgame shows for a fifth consecutive year.

This was the last World Series Jack Buck would call in his lifetime. After the World Series, CBS elected to replace him with Boston Red Sox announcer Sean McDonough for 1992 and beyond. Although Buck continued to call games for the St. Louis Cardinals for the remainder of the decade, they did not reach the World Series again until 2004, two years after his death from lung cancer. His broadcast partner McCarver would be in the booth for each of the four subsequent World Series; he would work the 1992 and 1993 series for CBS, rejoin ABC as part of its lead Baseball Network team for the 1995 World Series, then move to Fox Sports where he would call the 1996 World Series alongside Buck's son Joe. After that, McCarver would go on to call every World Series that was covered by Fox until he retired from full-time broadcasting at the end of the 2013 season.

The Series telecast drew an overall national Nielsen rating of 24.0 and a 39 share for CBS; Game 7 drew a 32.2 rating and 49 share. As of 2026, no subsequent World Series has approached either number in national television ratings, although the 2025 World Series did pull in 51 million viewers across the U.S., Canada, and Japan.

== Quotes ==
Puckett swings and hits a blast! Deep left-center! Way back! Way back! It's gone! The Twins go to the seventh game! Touch 'em all, Kirby Puckett! Touch 'em all, Kirby Puckett! And the Twins have won this game 4-3 on a dramatic home run by Kirby Puckett!

— John Gordon on 830 WCCO AM in the Minnesota area calling Kirby Puckett's game winning home run in Game 6.

And the two-one pitch to the Minnesota centerfielder is driven to deep left-centerfield, back goes Keith Mitchell ... it is gone, home run Puckett! And Charlie Leibrandt has turned the lights out of the Metrodome...again! Kirby Puckett with a single, a triple, a scoring flyball, and a game winning home run against Charlie Leibrandt. The final score in 11 innings, Minnesota 4, Atlanta 3!!

— Vin Scully of CBS Radio Sports calling Kirby Puckett's game winning home run in Game 6.

Peña, right foot on the rubber. You can taste the pressure here in the 'Dome as Alejandro straightens up. And the pitch to Larkin. Swung on—a high fly ball into left center! The run will score, the ball will bounce for a single, and the Minnesota Twins are the champions of the world!

— Vin Scully of CBS Radio Sports calling Gene Larkin's series-winning RBI-single in Game 7.

The Twins are gonna win the World Series! The Twins have won it! It's a base hit, it's a 1-0, ten inning victory!

— Jack Buck of CBS Sports calling Gene Larkin's series-winning RBI-single in Game 7.

== See also ==
- 1991 Japan Series
