= Terry Pendleton =

American baseball player and coach (born 1960)

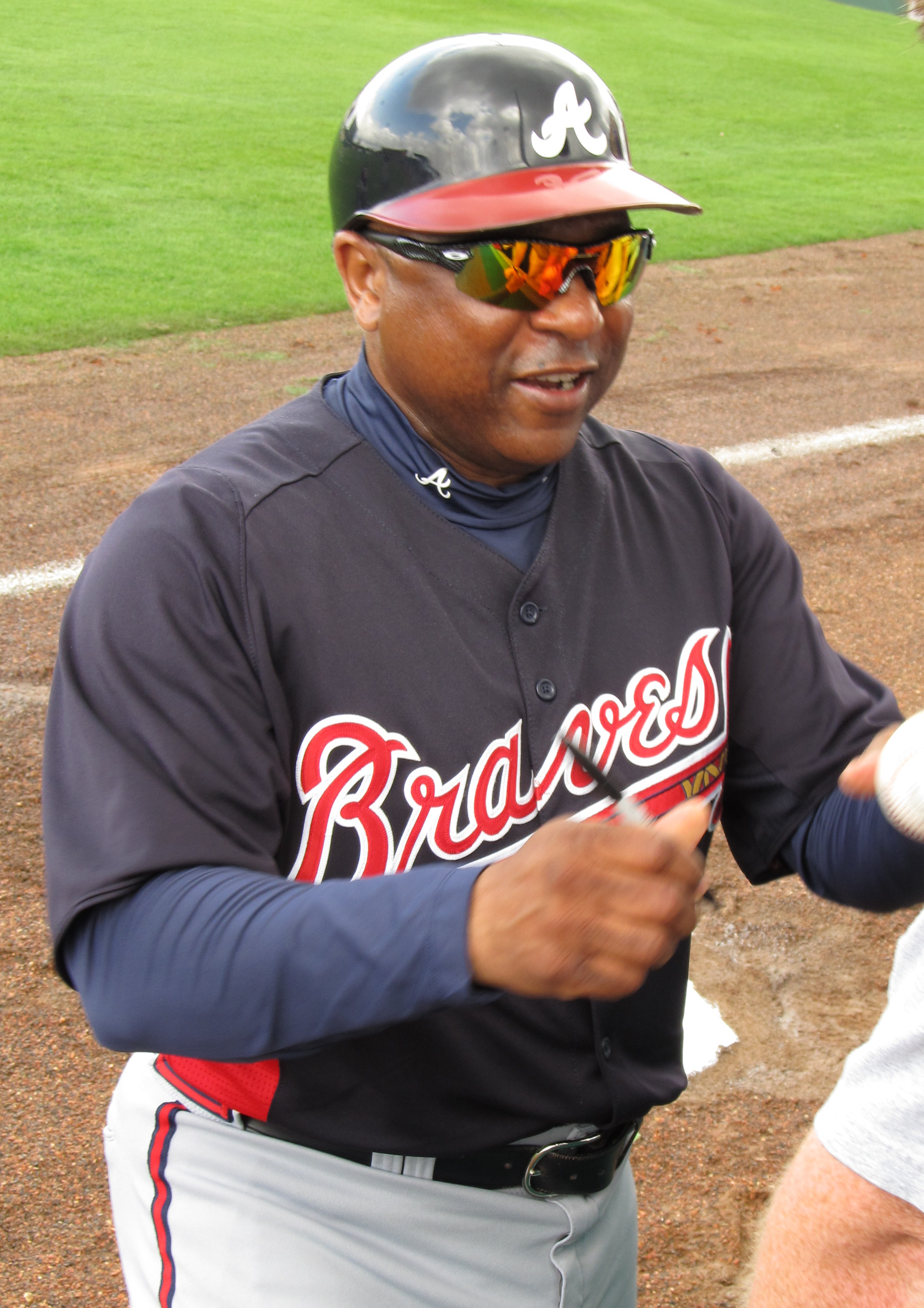
- Pendleton as a coach with the Atlanta Braves
- Third baseman
- Born: July 16, 1960 (age 66); Los Angeles, California, U.S.
- Batted: Switch Threw: Right

MLB debut
- July 18, 1984, for the St. Louis Cardinals

Last MLB appearance
- September 25, 1998, for the Kansas City Royals

MLB statistics
- Batting average: .270
- Home runs: 140
- Runs batted in: 946
- Stats at Baseball Reference

Teams
- As player: St. Louis Cardinals (1984–1990); Atlanta Braves (1991–1994); Florida Marlins (1995–1996); Atlanta Braves (1996); Cincinnati Reds (1997); Kansas City Royals (1998); As coach: Atlanta Braves (2002–2017)

Career highlights and awards
- All-Star (1992); NL MVP (1991); 3× Gold Glove Award (1987, 1989, 1992); NL batting champion (1991); Braves Hall of Fame

Terry Lee Pendleton (born July 16, 1960) is an American former third baseman in Major League Baseball (MLB). He played primarily for the St. Louis Cardinals and Atlanta Braves, but he also spent time with the Florida Marlins, Cincinnati Reds, and Kansas City Royals. After his playing career, he became a coach for the Braves. Pendleton holds the record for most World Series appearances without a championship win, alongside Rube Marquard and Fred Merkle, with 5 during his 15-year career.

== Early life ==
Terry Lee Pendleton was born on July 16, 1960, in Los Angeles, California. Pendleton started his baseball career as an Eastside Little League player, and then he moved on to play second base at Channel Islands High School.

== College career ==
Pendleton attended and played at Oxnard College from 1979 to 1980. The 1979 Oxnard team was the school's first team, and he helped lead the Condors to a state championship berth while earning a scholarship. He transferred to Fresno State for the 1981 and 1982 seasons, and was a key contributor to the team's fourth consecutive conference title in the 1982 season, setting a school record with 98 hits on the season. He was recognized as an All-American. Pendleton had his jersey retired in 2007, alongside the jerseys of Tex Clevenger and Jimy Williams.

== Professional career ==
=== Draft and minor leagues ===
Pendleton was drafted by the St. Louis Cardinals in the seventh round of the 1982 amateur draft and subsequently signed with the team on June 12, 1982.

Pendleton's minor league campaign began with the Johnson City Cardinals and the St. Petersburg Cardinals during the 1982 season. Pendleton was moved up to class AA baseball with the Arkansas Travelers for the 1983 season. He was selected to the league's all-star team. Making steady progress, Pendleton was promoted to class AAA in 1984 and played for the Louisville Redbirds. After four games at second base, Pendleton became a third baseman, the position he would play the rest of his career. The Cardinals were so impressed with Pendleton's development as a third baseman in Louisville that they traded their starting third baseman, Ken Oberkfell, to the Atlanta Braves and temporarily placed Andy Van Slyke at third base while Pendleton continued to gain experience. However, when Van Slyke committed 7 errors in 30 games, the Cardinals promoted Pendleton to the majors, and he began his major league career as the Cards' starting third baseman.

=== St. Louis Cardinals (1984–1990) ===
1986 photocard of Pendleton for St. Louis Cardinals

Pendleton made his major league debut on July 18, 1984, against the San Francisco Giants. Batting sixth in the lineup, he made an immediate impact, getting three hits in five at-bats en route to an 8–4 victory for the Cardinals. In 67 games during the 1984 season, Pendleton had a .324 batting average, 20 stolen bases, and finished tied for seventh in Major League Baseball Rookie of the Year Award voting. The 1985 season saw Pendleton remain in the starting lineup at third base. His batting average trailed off, and he only hit .240 for the season and was caught stealing 12 times; he had 17 stolen bases on the season. He hit an inside-the-park grand slam off Joe Sambito when Danny Heep collided with Terry Blocker in right-centerfield in the fifth inning of an 8–2 win over the New York Mets in the second game of a doubleheader at Shea Stadium on June 9, 1985. The Cardinals advanced to the 1985 World Series, and Pendleton ended up hitting the Cardinals' only triple, doing so in the Cardinals' 3–0 Game 4 win. His statline for the 1986 season was only modestly better. His batting average remained low at .239 and he only hit a single home run, but he was able to steal 24 bases, hit 26 doubles, and 5 triples. St. Louis management became disappointed with Pendleton after the season, but manager Whitey Herzog pointed out to them that it was his base running and fielding (he led the National League in putouts and assists) that made him vital to the team's success.

Pendleton answered front office criticism in his best season to date, the 1987 season. He improved in many statistical aspects in which he was struggling, including raising his batting average to a respectable .286. He was a strong contributor to the team's pennant win, placing second on the team in home runs, third in runs batted in, and tied for third in stolen bases. Pendleton's fielding efforts led to his earning a Gold Glove, the first by a Cardinal third baseman since Ken Reitz in 1975, as well as finishing tied for 17th in MVP voting. Unfortunately, as the Cardinals reached the 1987 World Series to play the Minnesota Twins, Pendleton ended up sidelined for most of the series with a rib cage injury. Despite this injury, Pendleton's switch-hitting ability meant that he was able to be used as a left-handed designated hitter during three of the four games the Cardinals played at the Hubert H. Humphrey Metrodome. He finished the series by playing three games, getting three hits on seven at-bats as the Cardinals fell in seven games for the second time in three years.

As the 1988 season began, Pendleton seemed to struggle where he had flourished. Despite racking up 80 stolen bases in his first four seasons, he only stole three bases during the whole 1988 season; in fact, he went the rest of his career without stealing more than 10. Injuries also plagued him in 1988, as he missed a few weeks with a right hamstring injury and had arthroscopic surgery in mid-September, which cut his season short. Despite this, Pendleton hoped to rebound for the 1989 season. Rebounding was exactly what he did, as he played in all 162 games for the only time in his career, finished ninth in hits with 162, and earned his second Gold Glove with an impressive .971 fielding percentage. Despite an impressive 1989 season, Pendleton struggled during the 1990 season. His overall production declined that season, as evidenced by his .230 batting average and .277 on-base percentage,. By the end of the season, he was splitting time with rookie Todd Zeile. After the season ended, Zeile appeared to be the third baseman of the future for the Cardinals, and Pendleton became a free agent.

Pendleton is one of many major league players to have an error on a baseball card. His 1985 Donruss card lists him as Jeff Pendleton.

=== Atlanta Braves (1991–1994) ===
After Pendleton was granted free agency on November 5, 1990, the Atlanta Braves were undergoing a similar overhaul as they acquired a new general manager, John Schuerholz. Assuming command of a last-place team, Schuerholz went to work and recruited half of a new infield by first signing Sid Bream to a contract and then inking Pendleton to a four-year, $10.2 million deal on December 3, 1990. With a new team and a new contract, Pendleton had a career year during the 1991 season, leading the Braves from a sixth-place finish the year prior to a division title and pennant. He had his best individual season, finishing with a .319 batting average and 187 hits, both of which led the National League. He also hit a career-high 22 home runs and a career-high eight triples. Despite his impressive statistics, Pendleton was not selected for the All-Star Game. He was, however, named the National League MVP, edging out Barry Bonds by only 15 points. Pendleton also won the MLB Comeback Player of the Year Award because of his statistical improvements. Pendleton's performance in the 1991 World Series—a rematch for him against the Twins and the third series he played in—was also impressive. He went 11 for 30, hit 2 home runs, and started at third for all 7 games. In Game 7 of the series, Pendleton hit a double in the eighth inning that should have scored a run, however Lonnie Smith did not advance home, and a double play to end the inning kept the score at 0–0, leading to the Braves' eventual Game 7 defeat and Pendleton's third Game 7 World Series loss in a row.

As the 1992 season rolled around, Pendleton remained in peak form. In 160 games, Pendleton batted .311, hit 21 home runs, and scored 94 runs. He had 105 RBIs, which ranked second in the National League and marked the only time he passed 100 RBIs in his career. Also, he racked up 199 hits, which was good for the National League lead as well as a career-high total. He also finished second in the National League in at bats with 640, earning his only bid to the Major League Baseball All-Star Game. Pendleton also won his third Gold Glove at third base (the first by a Braves third baseman since Clete Boyer in 1969) en route to the Braves making their second World Series appearance in a row. The Braves fell to the Toronto Blue Jays in 6 games, losing all 4 games by 1 run. Pendleton batted .240, going 6-for-25. This marked Pendleton's fourth World Series loss in four attempts. Pendleton continued to produce extra-base hits during the 1993 season, hitting 17 home runs and 33 doubles. However, he appeared to be showing signs of slowing down; although he placed second in at bats with 633, he led the National League in outs with 490. His batting average of .272 was notably lower than his previous two seasons, and his luck did not fare any better as the 1994 season rolled around. He spent part of the season on the disabled list because of spasms in his neck and back, and after only hitting .252 for the season, Pendleton opted for free agency.

=== Florida Marlins (1995–1996) ===
Pendleton was granted free agency on October 24, 1994, and he was picked up by the Florida Marlins on April 7, 1995. Pendleton improved his batting average to .290, and hit 14 home runs while playing in 133 games. Pendleton went on to play 111 games for the Marlins in 1996, hitting .251 with 7 home runs.

=== Atlanta Braves (1996) ===
After spending the 1995 and most of the 1996 on the Marlins, Pendleton was traded back to the injury battered Braves. Right-fielder David Justice was lost for the season with a shoulder separation in May, and shortstop Jeff Blauser suffered a broken bone in his left hand, which caused him to miss some playing time. Acquiring Pendleton meant Chipper Jones could play at his natural shortstop position while Pendleton played third. Pendleton was traded to the Braves on August 13, 1996, for minor league prospect Roosevelt Brown. He went on to play in the 1996 World Series—the fifth World Series of his career. However, he was used only in a limited role en route to a 6-game loss to the New York Yankees, leaving Pendleton 0-for-5 in his chances for a World Series ring.

=== Cincinnati Reds (1997) ===
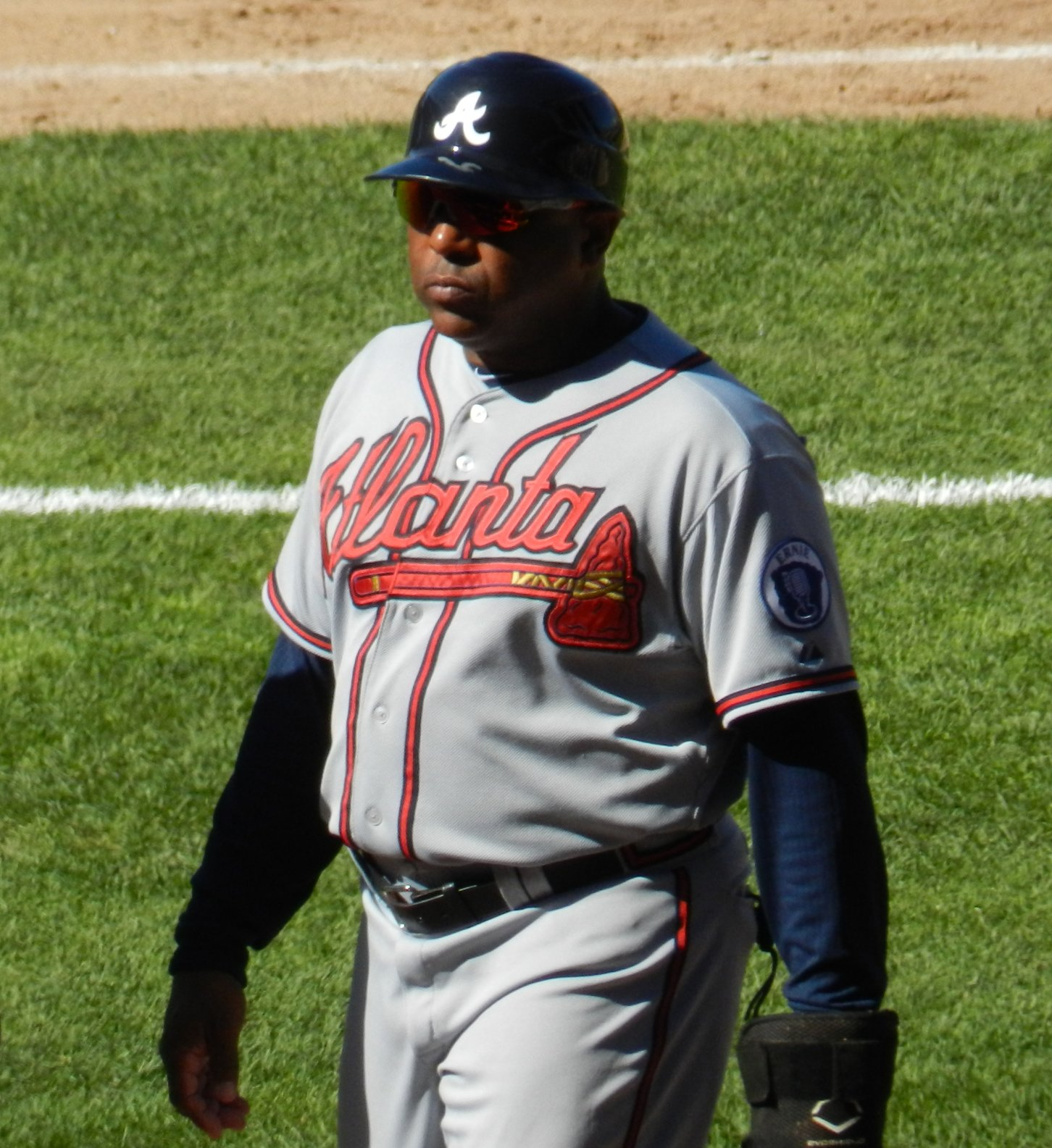
Pendleton as the Braves' first base coach, 2011.

The Braves let Pendleton go after the 1996 season, and he signed on with the Cincinnati Reds on January 27, 1997. However, he was released on July 24, 1997, after hitting .248 with one home run and two stolen bases. While with the Reds, Pendleton had three stints on the disabled list, and after his release, he spent the rest of the season recovering and did not sign with another club.

=== Kansas City Royals (1998) ===
In January 1998, the Kansas City Royals were looking for veteran leadership, and on January 20, 1998, signed Pendleton to provide a veteran presence and help mentor its younger players. Pendleton was used in a limited role, backing up Dean Palmer. He played 79 games in 1998, splitting time between the designated hitter position and third base. After the 1998 season ended—his 15th professional season—Pendleton retired.

=== Career statistics ===
In 1893 games over 15 seasons, Pendleton posted a .270 batting average (1897-for-7032) with 851 runs, 356 doubles, 39 triples, 140 home runs, 946 RBI, 127 stolen bases, 486 bases on balls, .316 on-base percentage and .391 slugging percentage. Defensively, he recorded a .957 fielding percentage and led National League third basemen in putouts and assists five times each. In 66 postseason games, including 5 World Series, he batted .252 (58-for-230) with 26 runs, 12 doubles, 3 triples, 3 home runs, 23 RBI, 2 stolen bases and 12 walks.

== Coaching career ==
=== Atlanta Braves (2002–2017) ===
After spending a couple years with his wife and three children, Pendleton got his first coaching job in November 2001 as the hitting coach of the Atlanta Braves. Pendleton served in that role through the 2010 season. In 2006, he was on a short list of manager candidates to replace Frank Robinson as manager of the Washington Nationals; a few weeks into the process, Pendleton withdrew himself from consideration. In 2007, Pendleton was also reportedly one of the front-runners to replace Tony La Russa as manager of the St. Louis Cardinals before La Russa ultimately decided to stay with the Cardinals. He was a candidate to replace Bobby Cox when the longtime Braves manager retired at the end of the 2010 season.

When Fredi Gonzalez was announced as Braves manager after the 2010 season, Pendleton was moved from hitting coach to first base coach, where he replaced Glenn Hubbard. Gonzalez was fired and replaced by Brian Snitker in May 2016, and Snitker chose Pendleton as bench coach. Pendleton was replaced by Walt Weiss after the 2017 season.

== See also ==
- List of Major League Baseball batting champions
