= Mark Lemke =

American baseball player (born 1965)

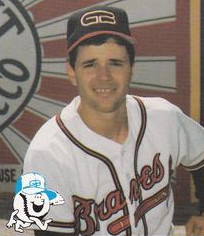
- Lemke in 1988
- Second baseman
- Born: August 13, 1965 (age 61); Utica, New York, U.S.
- Batted: Switch Threw: Right

MLB debut
- September 17, 1988, for the Atlanta Braves

Last MLB appearance
- May 25, 1998, for the Boston Red Sox

MLB statistics
- Batting average: .246
- Home runs: 32
- Runs batted in: 270
- Stats at Baseball Reference

Teams
- Atlanta Braves (1988–1997); Boston Red Sox (1998)

Career highlights and awards
- World Series champion (1995)

Mark Alan Lemke (born August 13, 1965) is an American former Major League Baseball player and current broadcaster. Nicknamed "the Lemmer", he was a popular second baseman for the Atlanta Braves from 1988 to 1997. He won the 1995 World Series with the Braves over the Cleveland Indians.

== Biography ==
=== Early life ===
Lemke grew up in Whitesboro, New York. He attended the now closed Sacred Heart Elementary Catholic school in West Utica. Lemke is also a graduate of Notre Dame High School in Utica.

==== Minor league ====
Lemke was drafted in the 27th round of the 1983 amateur draft by the Atlanta Braves. Lemke decided against attending Purdue University and spent the next four years in the Braves' minor league system, spending time with the Gulf Coast League Braves, Anderson Braves, Sumter Braves, Durham Bulls, Greenville Braves, and Richmond Braves. He made his major league debut on September 17, 1988, when the Braves called him up from AAA when the roster expanded to 40 players. In 1988, Lemke won the Hank Aaron Award as the top offensive player in the Braves' minor league system. Lemke split time between the minor and major leagues until 1990.

=== Career ===
In his 11-year career, Lemke played in 62 postseason games and appeared in four World Series (1991, 1992, 1995, 1996), all with Atlanta in their "Big Three" era.

He led the team with a .417 batting average in the 1991 World Series. He won a World Series with the Braves in 1995. He also was the last out in the 1996 World Series, when the New York Yankees won their first World Series in 18 years, popping out to Yankee third baseman Charlie Hayes with two on and the count full. Lemke is the all-time record holder for most career plate appearances without being hit by a pitch (3,664).

==== Boston Red Sox ====
The sharp fielding Lemke left the Braves after the 1997 season. On March 26, 1998, he signed as a free agent with the Boston Red Sox. While trying to turn a double play in a game against the Chicago White Sox on May 19, 1998, Lemke was injured in a collision with baserunner Chad Kreuter. He suffered a concussion that finished his season and essentially ended his major league career.

=== Post major leagues ===
With his big league career over, Lemke decided to chase a dream and, in 1999, signed as a knuckleball pitcher with the New Jersey Jackals an independent Northern League team. Lemke, who also worked as an infield coach during his stint with the Jackals, was 5-1 with a 6.68 earned run average in 1999. He returned the next season with the Jackals, but was released on June 20, 2000, after being hammered in his first few appearances. In that stint though, he was wild with his knuckleball and threw an independent league record nine wild pitches in successive at bats.

Currently, Lemke hosts the Braves pregame show on the Braves Radio Network with co-hosts Leo Mazzone and Buck Belue on WCNN-AM in Atlanta. Lemke also fills in on radio during spring training and road games during the regular season as color commentator, until 2008 with Pete Van Wieren and presently with Jim Powell

== In popular culture ==
Lemke is considered the indirect namesake of the Homestar Runner cartoon. When naming the character, creators Mike and Matt Chapman recalled a gaffe by friend James Huggins: imitating a local commercial that mentioned Lemke, Huggins imaginatively referred to the baseball player as the "home star runner" for the Braves as he could not recall the position Lemke played.
