= Ron Gant =

American baseball player and news anchor (born 1965)

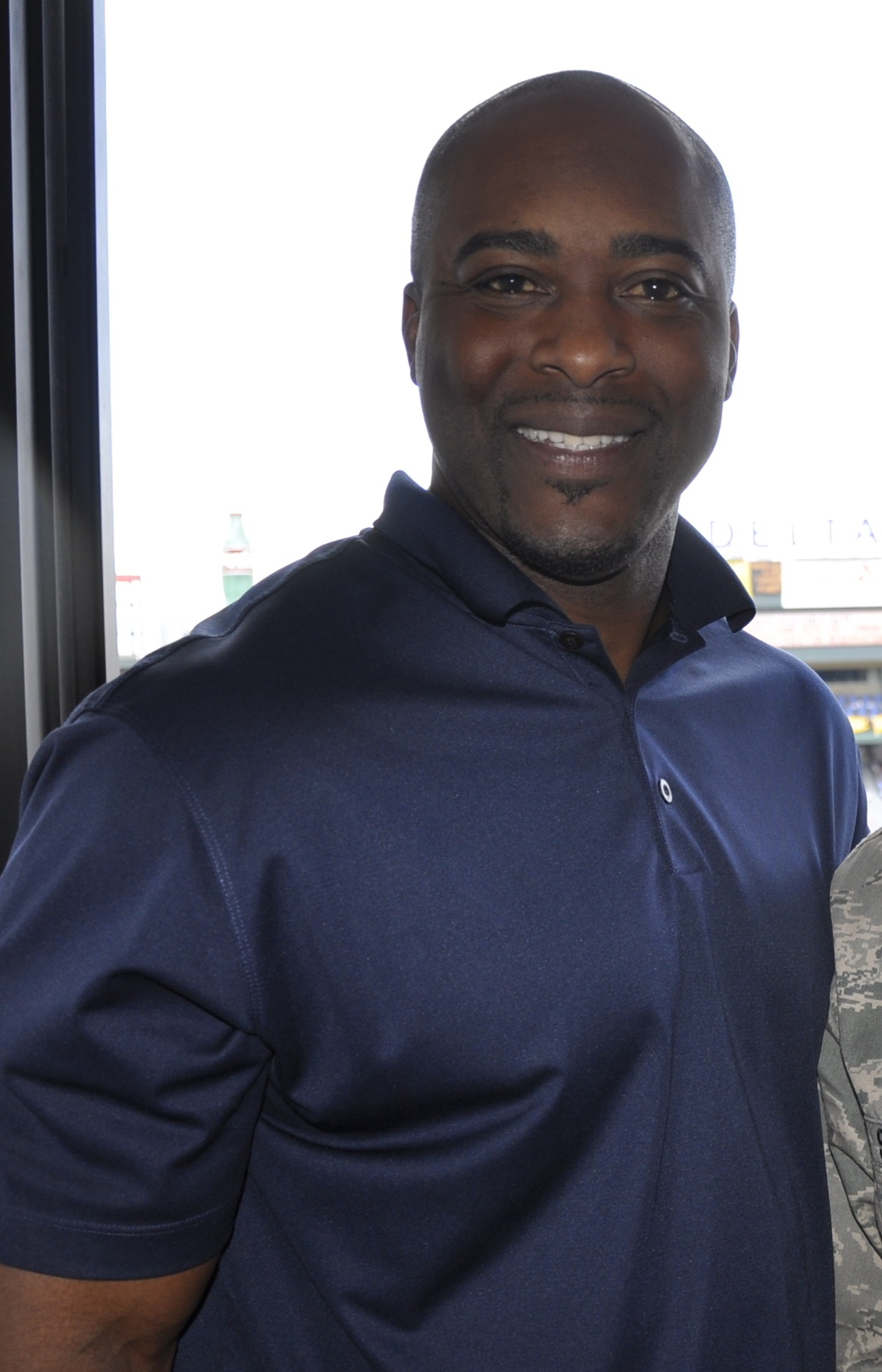
- Gant in 2012
- Left fielder
- Born: March 2, 1965 (age 61); Victoria, Texas, U.S.
- Batted: Right Threw: Right

MLB debut
- September 6, 1987, for the Atlanta Braves

Last MLB appearance
- May 25, 2003, for the Oakland Athletics

MLB statistics
- Batting average: .256
- Home runs: 321
- Runs batted in: 1,008
- Stats at Baseball Reference

Teams
- Atlanta Braves (1987–1993); Cincinnati Reds (1995); St. Louis Cardinals (1996–1998); Philadelphia Phillies (1999–2000); Anaheim Angels (2000); Colorado Rockies (2001); Oakland Athletics (2001); San Diego Padres (2002); Oakland Athletics (2003)

Career highlights and awards
- 2× All-Star (1992, 1995); Silver Slugger Award (1991)

Ronald Edwin Gant (born March 2, 1965) is an American television news anchor and former professional baseball outfielder. He played in Major League Baseball (MLB) between 1987 and 2003 for eight different teams, primarily the Atlanta Braves (1987–1993), St. Louis Cardinals (1996–1998), and Philadelphia Phillies (1999–2000). He joined the 30–30 club—recording at least 30 stolen bases and 30 home runs in the same season—in 1990 and 1991, while with the Braves. He batted and threw right-handed.

Gant is currently a co-host on WAGA-TV's morning news program, Good Day Atlanta.

== Early life ==
Gant was born in Victoria, Texas, to George Gant, a chemistry professor, and Alice Hardeman, a special education teacher. Gant played football and baseball in high school. He was recruited heavily to play college baseball for such schools as Texas and Oklahoma, but turned down scholarship offers in order to play professionally after high school.

== Playing career ==
Gant was drafted by the Atlanta Braves in the fourth round of the 1983 MLB draft (100th overall), and joined the Braves in 1987 as a September call-up, after winning the Bill Lucas Award as the Braves' Minor League Player of the Year in 1986. He collected 22 hits in 83 at-bats, including two home runs. During the 1988 season, the rookie Gant was an everyday player for the struggling Braves, who finished with a record of 54–106. After a disappointing sophomore season in 1989, Gant was sent down to the minor leagues to learn how to play the outfield. Gant returned to form and the starting lineup in 1990, when he batted .303 with 32 home runs and 84 RBI while being named the National League Comeback Player of the Year by The Sporting News.

Additionally, Gant stole thirty-three bases in 1990, qualifying for the 30–30 club. He duplicated that feat in 1991, joining Willie Mays (1956–1957) and Bobby Bonds (1977–1978) as the only players in Major League history to that point to have two 30 home run/30 stolen base seasons in a row. Barry Bonds later eclipsed the accomplishment, qualifying for the 30–30 Club in three straight seasons, from 1995–1997.

Although his home run and stolen base totals were extremely similar the following year, most of his other stats were not as good: he hit just .251 with over 100 strikeouts and 23 fewer hits in just 14 fewer at-bats. His RBI numbers also increased to 105.

The Braves lost to the Minnesota Twins in the 1991 World Series. Gant batted .267 in the series, with four RBIs, as the Twins won it in a close and exciting seventh game. During Game 2 of the 1991 World Series, Gant had a memorable and controversial confrontation with Twins first baseman Kent Hrbek. As Gant was trying to make it back to first base to avoid Twins pitcher Kevin Tapani's pickoff, he claimed Hrbek pulled his leg off the base during the swipe tag and Gant was called out. Drew Coble, the first base umpire, ruled that Gant's momentum had carried him off the bag, and refused to change his call. Aiding the controversy the commentators at the time remarked that it appeared that Hrbek had in fact lifted Gant off the bag and that his 235-pound frame helped him lift the lighter Gant who weighs only 172 pounds. New York Times writer Claire Smith wrote, "Hrbek seemed to lift Gant's leg right off the bag as the Braves' center fielder fought to keep his balance." This play caused the Braves' bench to empty during the argument.

Although he would never hit .300 again, Gant's batting average continued to climb back up into the .270s and his power numbers stayed great, while he continually drove in over 80 runs a year, peaking at 117 in 1993. In both 1991 and 1993, he was in the top five in the league in runs batted in.

In 1992, Gant made his last World Series appearance, where he got one double in eight at-bats, and the Braves lost again, this time in six games to the Toronto Blue Jays.

On September 15, 1993, during a nationally televised game on ESPN against the Cincinnati Reds, Gant hit a game-winning walk-off home run off Rob Dibble to give the Braves a come from behind victory. The Braves trailed 6–2, going into the bottom of the 9th.

=== Post–Braves career ===
Shortly after signing one of the richest contracts in Braves history in 1994, Gant broke his right leg in an ATV accident. The Braves ended up releasing him; he would not play again until 1995, emerging with the Cincinnati Reds before being signed by the St. Louis Cardinals in 1996.

1997 was the low point of Gant's career when he struck out 162 times and batted .229 for the Cardinals. After the Cardinals didn't play him full-time in 1998 (though he still hit 26 homers), he was traded by the Cardinals with Jeff Brantley and Cliff Politte to the Philadelphia Phillies for Ricky Bottalico and Garrett Stephenson on November 19.

The next year, Gant would have his last real quality season. With the Phillies in 1999, he batted a solid .260 with 17 home runs and 77 RBIs. He had 13 stolen bases and 107 runs scored, with 27 doubles and two triples, in 134 hits.

He set the lowest RBI total ever by a player with 25 or more homers (tied in 2015 by Joc Pederson, who also hit 26 home runs with 54 RBIs).

After a non-productive 2003 season with the A's, Gant retired at age 38.

In a 16-season career, Gant batted .256 with 321 home runs and 1,008 RBIs. He had 243 stolen bases and 1,080 runs scored in 1,832 games. Gant had 302 doubles and 50 triples in his career. He ended with 1,651 hits in 6,449 at-bats. Gant averaged 20 home runs, 63 RBIs, and 15 stolen bases a year. In postseason play, Gant was a .228 hitter with eight home runs and 28 RBIs in 52 playoff games; he had 43 hits in 189 at-bats.

== Broadcasting ==
During the 2005 Major League Baseball season, Gant worked as a color commentator for the Atlanta Braves on TBS. He also worked as an analyst on SportSouth during Braves games and on the MLB Network.

On October 25, 2012, he became a news anchor for the Atlanta Fox owned-and-operated station WAGA-TV, co-hosting the morning show Good Day Atlanta.

== Personal life ==
In 1992, Gant was involved in a bar fight in Georgia with Connie Mack IV, the great-grandson of Hall of Famer Connie Mack. Mack suffered a broken ankle in the fight, but a jury ultimately found that Gant was not responsible for Mack's injuries.

In February 2005, Gant was involved in a fatal car accident when his SUV collided with a pickup truck in Fulton County, Georgia, killing the truck's driver.

In June 2005, Gant and his wife assisted the Office of the Attorney General of Georgia and the Georgia Bureau of Investigation in setting up a sting operation which resulted in the arrest of six people for charges related to mortgage fraud involving the sale of the family's Alpharetta home. The state alleged the scheme would have netted the fraudsters a profit of more than $800,000 (equivalent to $1,320,000 in 2025).

As of 2015, Gant lived in Suwanee, Georgia. He has five children: a son and four daughters.

== See also ==
- List of Major League Baseball career home run leaders
- List of Major League Baseball career runs scored leaders
- List of Major League Baseball career runs batted in leaders
- 30–30 club
