= Scott Leius =

American baseball player (born 1965)

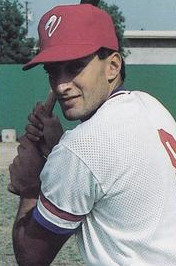
- Leius in 1988
- Third baseman
- Born: September 24, 1965 (age 61); Yonkers, New York, U.S.
- Batted: Right Threw: Right

MLB debut
- September 3, 1990, for the Minnesota Twins

Last MLB appearance
- July 3, 1999, for the Kansas City Royals

MLB statistics
- Batting average: .244
- Home Runs: 28
- Runs batted in: 172
- Stats at Baseball Reference

Teams
- Minnesota Twins (1990–1995); Cleveland Indians (1996); Kansas City Royals (1998–1999)

Career highlights and awards
- World Series champion (1991)

Scott Thomas Leius (born September 24, 1965) is a former American League baseball player. He played for the Minnesota Twins, Cleveland Indians, and Kansas City Royals over the course of a nearly decade-long career.

== Career ==
After graduating from Mamaroneck High School, Leius was drafted by the Minnesota Twins in the 13th round of the 1986 Major League Baseball draft out of Concordia College in New York. He then played in the minor leagues for the next four seasons. He was a late season call up by the Minnesota Twins and debuted with the parent club on September 3, 1990. Leius would remain with the Minnesota Twins through the 1995 season when he left for the Cleveland Indians where he spent just one season, 1996. Leius was out of Major League Baseball for the 1997 season. Leius played for the Kansas City Royals during the 1998 and 1999 seasons, ending his career on July 3, 1999.

It was with Minnesota that Leius was part of their 1991 World Series season, during that series Leius is best known for hitting a game-winning home run off Tom Glavine breaking up a 2-2 tie in the 8th inning of Game 2. A steady defender at third base, he finished second to Wade Boggs in Gold Glove balloting in 1994. His highest yearly salary was paid out in 1995 while Leius was with the Minnesota Twins and amounted to $760,000 USD. This payout for Leius was a result his 1994 season in which he posted career highs in runs (57), home runs (14), RBIs (49) and tied his career high in slugging percentage (.417).
