= Lambin =

Lambin is a surname. Notable people with the surname include:

- Chase Lambin (born 1979), American baseball player and coach
- Daniela Mona Lambin (born 1991), Estonian footballer
- Denis Lambin (1520–1572), French classical scholar
- Suzanne Lambin (1902–2008), French microbiologist
