= Kevin Tapani =

American baseball player (born 1964)

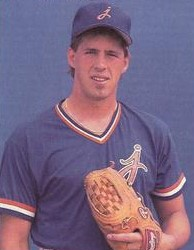
- Pitcher
- Born: February 18, 1964 (age 62); Des Moines, Iowa, U.S.
- Batted: Right Threw: Right

MLB debut
- July 4, 1989, for the New York Mets

Last MLB appearance
- September 27, 2001, for the Chicago Cubs

MLB statistics
- Win–loss record: 143–125
- Earned run average: 4.35
- Strikeouts: 1,482
- Stats at Baseball Reference

Teams
- New York Mets (1989); Minnesota Twins (1989–1995); Los Angeles Dodgers (1995); Chicago White Sox (1996); Chicago Cubs (1997–2001)

Career highlights and awards
- World Series champion (1991)

Kevin Ray Tapani (born February 18, 1964) is an American former Major League Baseball pitcher who played for the New York Mets, Minnesota Twins, Los Angeles Dodgers, Chicago White Sox, and Chicago Cubs from 1989 to 2001.

== Early life ==
Tapani was raised in Escanaba in the Upper Peninsula of Michigan. His surname is a Finnish name: his great-grandparents had emigrated from Finland to the Upper Peninsula. He quarterbacked Escanaba High School to the 1981 MHSAA Class A State Football Championship. Tapani then went on to attend Central Michigan University, where he was a star pitcher for the Chippewas from 1983 to 1986, finishing with a career record of 23–8, helping the Chippewas to three Mid-American Conference titles, and tossing a no-hitter against Eastern Michigan University in 1986. In 1985, he played collegiate summer baseball with the Falmouth Commodores of the Cape Cod Baseball League.

Tapani was drafted by the Chicago Cubs in the ninth round of the 1985 MLB June amateur draft, but did not sign. He was then selected on June 2, 1986, in the second round of the 1986 MLB June amateur draft by the Oakland Athletics. Tapani signed five days later and was assigned to Medford A's of the low Single-A Northwest League. However, he did not stay at Medford long, as after stops in Modesto and Huntsville, he made his final start of his first season in professional baseball pitching for the Triple-A Tacoma Tigers and finished the year a combined 8–2 with a 2.84 ERA and 47 strikeouts in 85 2/3 innings. In 1987, Tapani began at Single-A Modesto, despite dominating at the level the previous year, and turned in another good season with a 10–7 record, a 3.76 ERA, and 121 strikeouts in 148 1/3 innings. On December 11, a three-team trade was completed that saw Tapani and fellow A's minor league pitcher Wally Whitehurst move to the New York Mets, starter Bob Welch and reliever Matt Young move from the Los Angeles Dodgers to the A's, minor league pitcher Jack Savage go from the Dodgers to the New York Mets, shortstop Alfredo Griffin and closer Jay Howell move from the A's to the Dodgers, and reliever Jesse Orosco go from the Mets to the Dodgers.

Following the trade, Tapani was again sent to single-A to start the 1988 season, but after three starts with the St. Lucie Mets in which he only allowed three earned runs in 19 innings, he was promoted to the Double-A Jackson Mets, where he went 5–1 in 24 appearances, including five starts. As fellow future Twin Rick Aguilera would see in his own climb to the major leagues, with no openings in the 1988 Mets starting rotation of Dwight Gooden, Bob Ojeda, Sid Fernandez, Ron Darling, and young phenom David Cone, even promising starters were groomed in minor league bullpens since this was the only way to crack the big league pitching staff. In 1989, Tapani went 7–5 with a 3.47 ERA for the Triple-A Tidewater Tides before being called up to the Mets in July.

== Major league career ==
Tapani made his major league debut on July 4, 1989. He entered the game in the first inning after starter Bob Ojeda had given up eight runs to the Houston Astros while only getting two outs. Thrown into the fire, Tapani completed 4 1/3 innings while giving up two hits and three walks, and only allowing one more run. Over the next four weeks, he would only get into two more games, pitching a total of 7 2/3 innings in relief. On July 31, just prior to the end of the non-waiver trade deadline, Tapani was included in the blockbuster trade that sent 1988 A.L. Cy Young Award winner Frank Viola from the Minnesota Twins to the Mets in exchange for major league swingman Rick Aguilera, minor league relievers Tim Drummond and Jack Savage, and young starter David West. Tapani was then thrown into the Twins' starting rotation and finished the 1989 season 2–2 with a 3.86 ERA in 32 2/3 innings.

After his promising debut, Tapani was made a fixture of the rotation in 1990 and finished the season 12–8 with 4.07 ERA – good enough for fifth place in the AL Rookie of the Year balloting, a distant 131 votes behind the winner, Cleveland Indians' catcher Sandy Alomar Jr. He would follow up his rookie season with perhaps his best overall season in 1991, finishing 16–9 with only 40 walks and 135 strikeouts in 244 innings with 2.99 ERA – the only sub-3.00 ERA of his career. He garnered enough Cy Young votes that year to finish a distant seventh behind winner Roger Clemens, as well as his own teammates Scott Erickson and Jack Morris, who finished second and fourth respectively; he also won the 1991 World Series with the Twins. Over his seven seasons with the Twins, Tapani was a workhorse starter for the Twins, averaging more than 13 wins and over 200 innings in his five full seasons. After suffering through three poor seasons (the beginning of what would be eight consecutive losing seasons) and looking at losing the soon-to-be free agent Tapani after the 1995 season, the Twins traded him on July 31 to the Los Angeles Dodgers for Ron Coomer, Chris Latham, José Parra, and Greg Hansell.

After finishing 4–2 down the stretch for the Dodgers, Tapani pitched in Game 3 against the Cincinnati Reds in the National League Divisional series and gave up three runs and four walks in 1/3 of an inning in relief of starter Hideo Nomo in a 10–1 loss that capped off the Reds' 3–0 sweep. After being granted free agency in December 1995, Tapani signed a one-year contract with the Chicago White Sox on February 3, 1996, and turned in another typical "Tapani" season for the Sox – finishing 13–10 with a 4.59 ERA and 150 strikeouts in 225 1/3 innings.

After again being granted free agency following the 1996 season, Tapani signed a five-year contract with the Cubs on December 13. On July 20, 1998, while playing for the Cubs, Tapani had perhaps the most memorable day of his career. Throwing eight innings against the Braves, he allowed three runs and topped it off by hitting a third-inning grand slam off former Twins teammate Denny Neagle in an 11–4 romp over the Atlanta Braves.

Tapani played his last game on September 27, 2001. His career record: 143 wins, 125 losses, and an ERA of 4.35. In 1998 with the Chicago Cubs, Tapani earned his best record of 19–9, though his ERA was 4.85. In 1991, with the Twins, Tapani had his lowest ERA of 2.99 to go with a 16–9 record and seventh place in the 1991 Cy Young Award voting.

== Personal life ==
After retirement, Tapani returned to his home in Minnetonka, Minnesota, to live with his wife, Sharon, and three children, Sarah (b 1991), Ryan (b 1994), and Luke (b 1996). Ryan is also a pitcher. He pitched for the Creighton Bluejays in college, and was also drafted by the Washington Nationals in the 21st round of the 2018 Major League Baseball draft. Ryan spent 3 years pitching in the Nationals minor league farm system, along with one for the Kane County Cougars of the American Association of Professional Baseball. In 1999, Tapani was elected as a member of the Central Michigan Athletics Hall of Fame. He has been involved with little league and youth baseball since his retirement including coaching both of his sons' teams.

Currently Kevin is a high school baseball coach at Providence Academy in Plymouth, Minnesota.
