= Triple-A All-Star Game =

Exhibition game played by Minor League Baseball players

- Status: Inactive
- Frequency: Annual
- Location: Varies (see prose)
- Years active: 32
- Inaugurated: July 13, 1988 (Pilot Field, Buffalo, New York, United States)
- Most recent: July 10, 2019 (Southwest University Park, El Paso, Texas, United States)
- Participants: Triple-A minor league baseball players
- Organizer: Triple-A Baseball

The Triple-A All-Star Game was an annual baseball game held from 1988 to 2019 between professional players from the affiliated Triple-A leagues of Minor League Baseball. These leagues were the International League (IL) and Pacific Coast League (PCL) from 1998 to 2019. Previously, the American Association competed along with the IL and PCL before it disbanded following the 1997 season. The 2020 game was cancelled along with the entire minor league season due to the COVID-19 pandemic. The 2021 game was postponed and not rescheduled after a delayed start to the season, and there has been no indication that the Triple-A All-Star Game will resume in the future.

All-Star players were selected through a vote by team managers and general managers, members of the media, and fans. From the inaugural 1988 event through 1997, teams of American League-affiliated Triple-A All-Stars faced off against teams of National League-affiliated Triple-A All-Stars. During this period, six games were won by National League teams, and four were won by American League teams. From 1998 through 2019, the IL and PCL each fielded a team composed of players in their respective leagues. The International League won 12 games, while the Pacific Coast League won 10.

Traditionally, the game took place on the day after the mid-summer Major League Baseball All-Star Game. The game was meant to mark a symbolic halfway-point in the season (though not the mathematical halfway-point which, for most seasons, was usually one month prior). The Triple-A leagues shared a common All-Star break, with no regular-season games scheduled for two days before the All-Star Game itself. Some additional events, such as the All-Star Fan Fest and Triple-A Home Run Derby, took place each year during this break in the regular season.

== History ==
At a meeting of the three Triple-A leagues of Minor League Baseball in 1986, International League (IL) president Harold Cooper proposed establishing committees to find ways to improve their product. One result was the creation of the Triple-A All-Star Game. In August 1987, the American Association (AA), International League, and Pacific Coast League (PCL) announced plans to begin holding joint all-star games in 1988 which would occur the day after the annual Major League Baseball All-Star Game. The first was to be played at Pilot Field in Buffalo, New York, home to the IL's Buffalo Bisons. The host city would then alternate annually between cities in each Triple-A league.

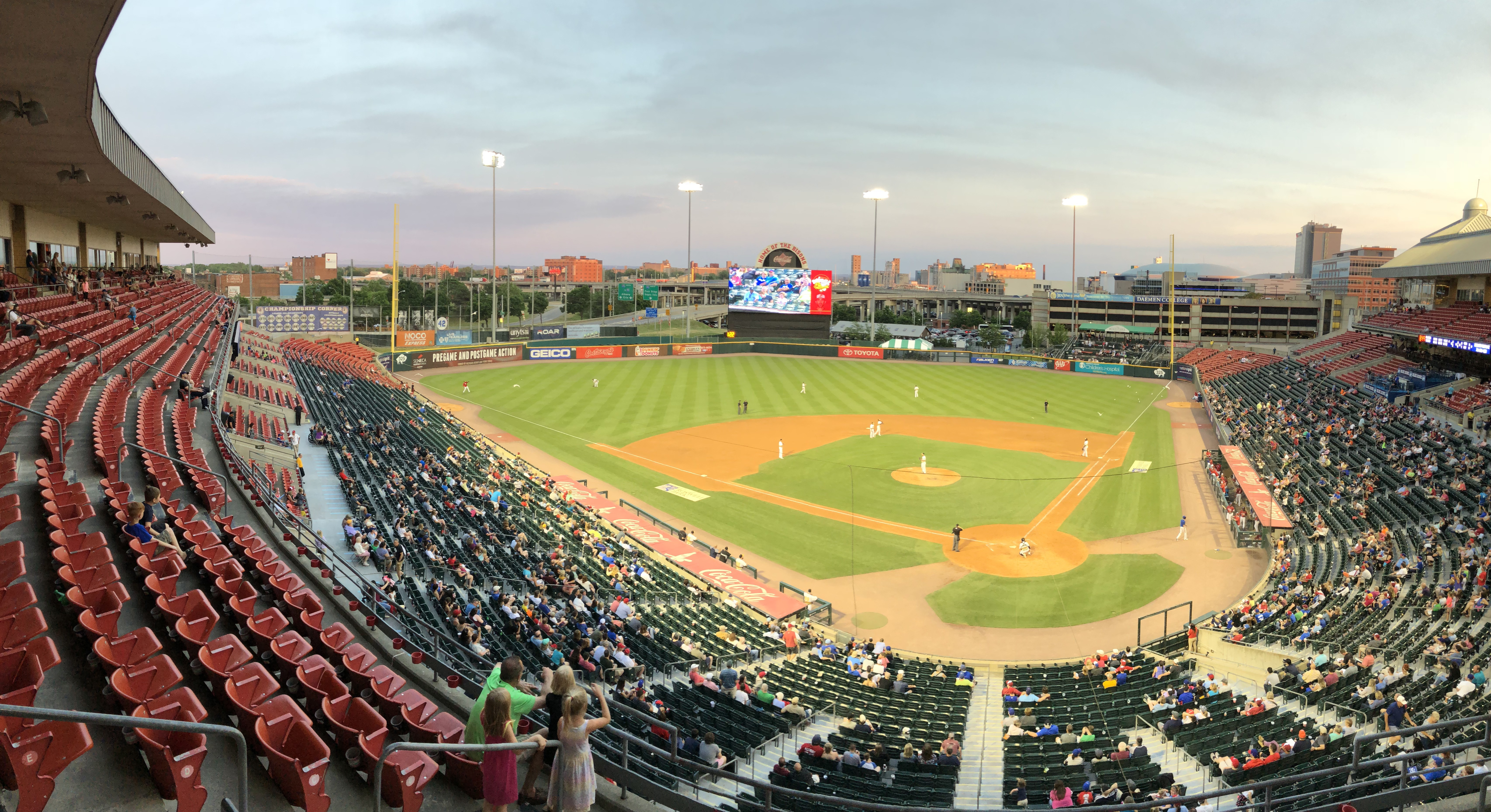
The first Triple-A All-Star Game was held at Pilot Field in Buffalo, New York, in 1988.

Due to the odd number of leagues, it was decided that one team would be made up of All-Stars from American League (AL) affiliates and the other of players from National League (NL) affiliates, with each Triple-A team having at least one representative. Starting players were elected by voters in each Triple-A city, while reserve players were chosen by a committee of the three league presidents and representatives from Baseball America, which sponsored the game.

At the inaugural Triple-A All-Star game on July 13, 1988, in Buffalo, the AL All-Stars defeated the NL team, 2–1, before a sellout crowd of 19,500 people and a national television audience watching on ESPN. Ed Jurak (Tacoma Tigers, PCL) was selected as the first Triple-A All-Star Game Most Valuable Player after leading off the top of the ninth inning with a triple and then scoring the winning run on Bob Geren's (Columbus Clippers, IL) ground out. Another part of the All-Star festivities was the Triple-A Home Run Derby, a contest to see which player could hit the most home runs. The first, held the day before the 1988 game, was won by Columbus' Geren.

The AL-versus-NL format continued to be used through the 1997 Triple-A All-Star Game. In the final game to utilize this format, the AL affiliates defeated the NL affiliates, 5–3, at Sec Taylor Stadium in Des Moines, Iowa, home to the AA's Iowa Cubs, on July 9, 1997. All told, the National League won six Triple-A All-Star Games, and the American League won four.

The American Association ceased operations after the 1997 season. So in 1998, the teams were reorganized so that one consisted of International League All-Stars and the other of Pacific Coast League All-Stars. The first IL versus PCL match-up occurred on July 8, 1998, at Harbor Park in Norfolk, Virginia, home of the IL's Norfolk Tides, with the IL team winning, 8–4.

From 2006 to 2016, the winning league earned the distinction of having its league champion (determined at the end of the season) being given home team status for the Triple-A National Championship Game, a single game to determine a Triple-A champion in the postseason. This changed in 2017, when home team status began being awarded to the team from the league which hosted the championship game.

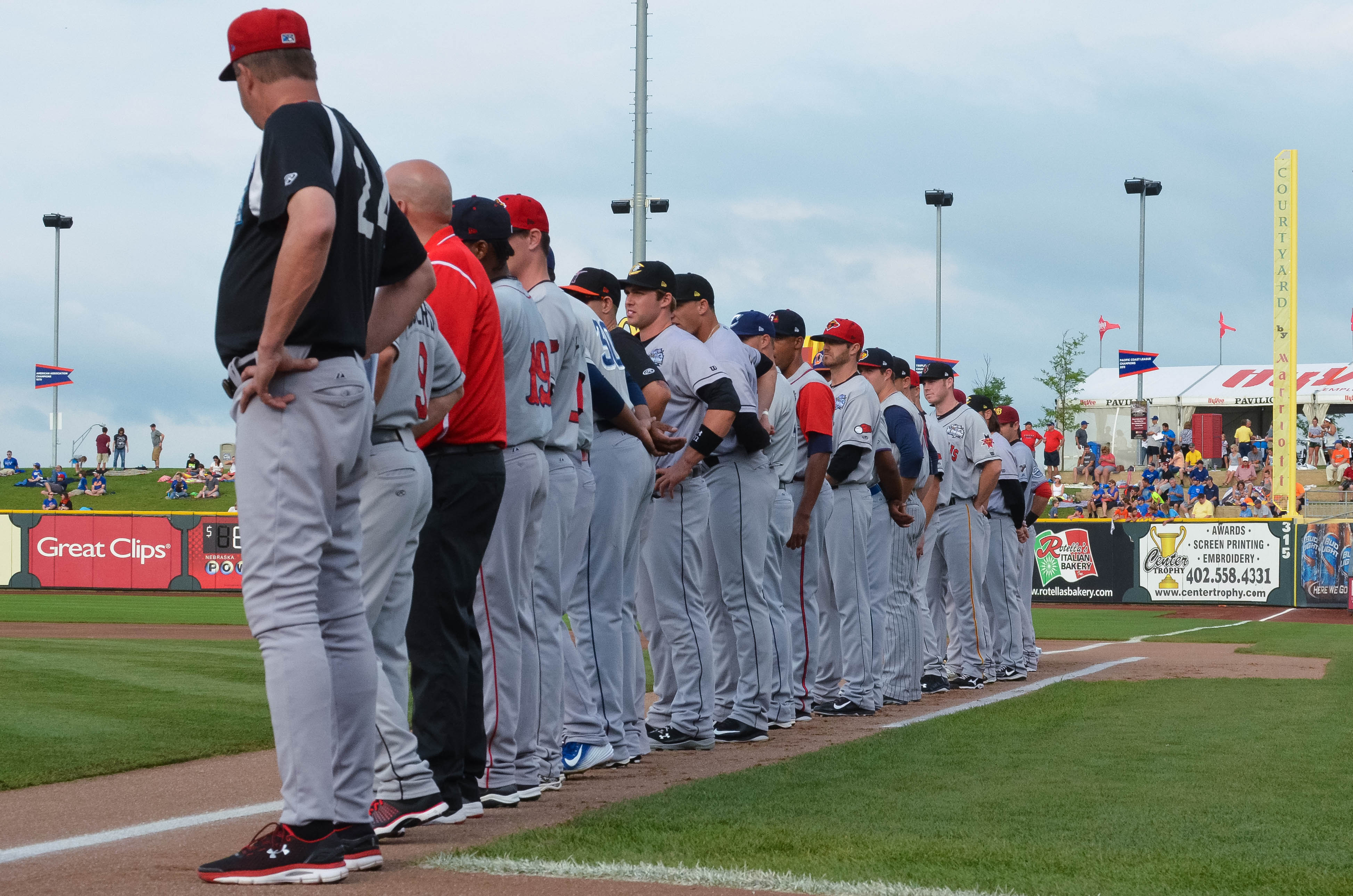
2015 IL All-Stars before the game

The most recent edition of the Triple-A All-Star Game was played on July 10, 2019, at Southwest University Park in El Paso, Texas, home to the PCL's El Paso Chihuahuas. The PCL won, 9–3, before 9,706 in attendance and a national television audience on MLB Network. Ty France (El Paso, PCL) and Eric Haase (Columbus, IL) were selected as the Top Stars (MVPs). Over 22 meetings, the International League won 12 Triple-A All-Star Games, and the Pacific Coast League won 10.

The start of the 2020 season was postponed due to the COVID-19 pandemic before ultimately being cancelled on June 30. This resulted in the cancellation of the 2020 game, which had been slated for PNC Field in Moosic, Pennsylvania, home of the IL's Scranton/Wilkes-Barre RailRiders.

In conjunction with Major League Baseball's restructuring of Minor League Baseball in 2021, the IL and PCL disbanded, and Triple-A teams were reorganized into the Triple-A East and Triple-A West. Opening Day for the 2021 season was postponed for nearly a month to temporarily eliminate commercial air travel and give players the opportunity to be vaccinated against COVID-19 before the season started. While the 2021 schedule originally included a three-day All-Star break, this was removed after the delayed start. The 2021 Triple-A All-Star Game, scheduled to be held at the Dell Diamond in Round Rock, Texas, home to the Triple-A West's Round Rock Express, was postponed and not rescheduled. In 2022, the Triple-A East and West were renamed the International League and Pacific Coast League, respectively, and they carried on the history of those leagues prior to reorganization. The 2022 Triple-A schedule included a four-day All-Star break from July 18–21, but there has been no indication that the All-Star Game will resume.

== Structure ==
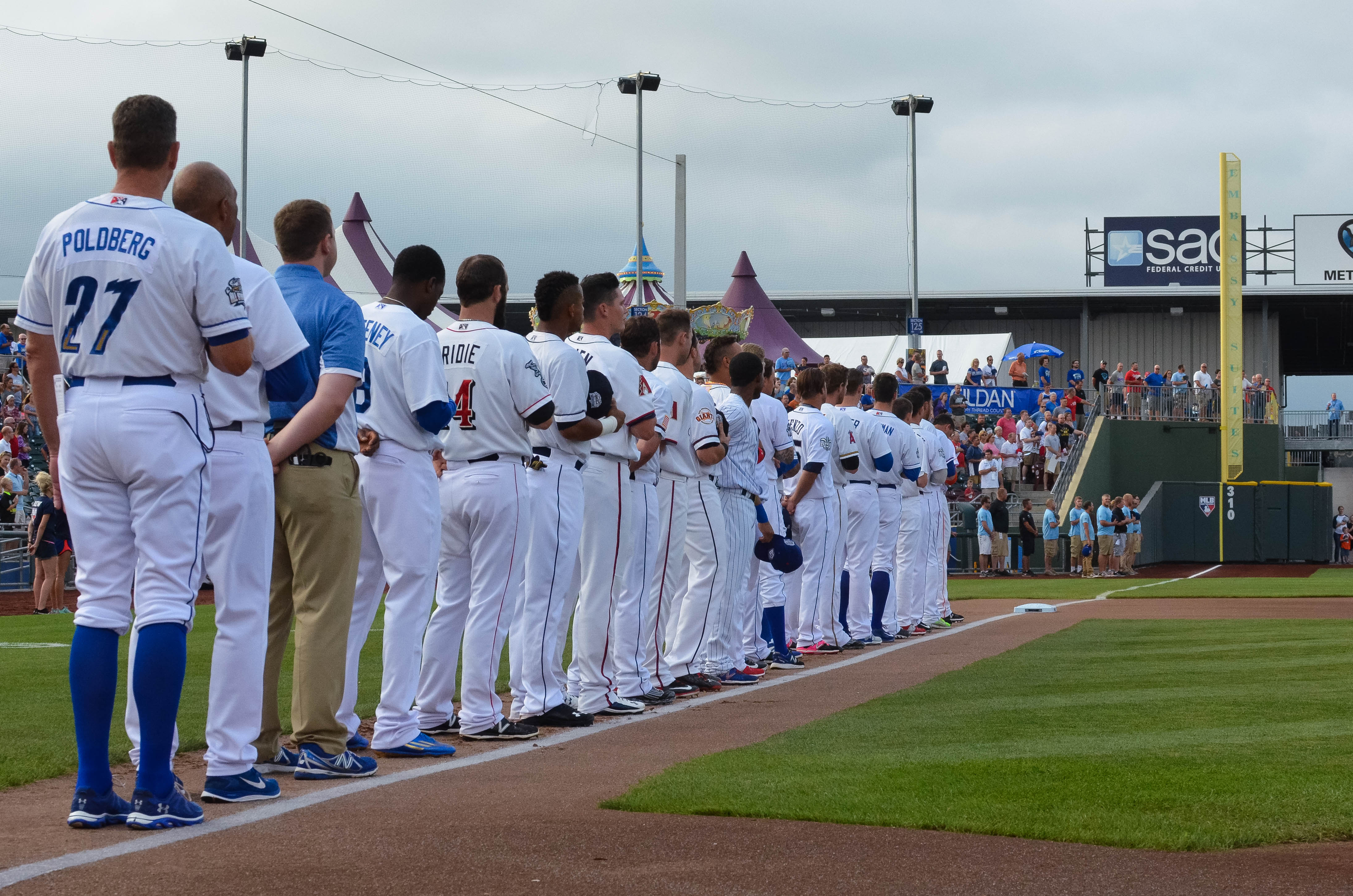
2015 PCL All-Stars before the game

In the 2019 Triple-A All-Star Game, the most recently held, each league's roster consisted of 33 players, though the actual number of players on gameday may have been less due to call-ups, injuries, or players choosing not to participate. Thirteen players were elected for each team through a vote by team managers and general managers, members of the media, and fans. Twenty additional players were selected by each league office to fill out their rosters. One goal of adding these additional players was to ensure every Triple-A team was represented.

The game itself consisted of a single nine-inning game to determine a champion. The league in which the host city competed was considered the home team, and the other team was designated as the visiting team. Designated hitters batted in place of pitchers. The only All-Star game to ever go beyond the prescribed nine innings was the 2004 event. Rules restricted the game from going beyond 10 innings, but the International League scored in the bottom of the 10th inning, avoiding a tie game as the result.

Historically, players wore their respective team's uniforms. Players on the home team wore their club's white home uniforms, while players on the away team wore their club's gray road uniforms. Often, a patch depicting the game's logo was sewn onto their jerseys and/or caps. One exception was in 2017, when players wore league-specific jerseys paired with the appropriate home/road pants and their respective team's cap.

The game was umpired by a four-man crew, with one umpire behind home plate and the others covering each base. Two of the umpires worked in the IL, while two worked in the PCL. Positions rotated each year, such that IL umpires were assigned to home plate and second base in even years, and PCL umpires manned those positions in odd years.

== Results ==
=== American League vs. National League (1988–1997) ===
Date	Winning league (All-time record)	Score	City	Ballpark	Host team (league)	Attendance	Ref.
July 13, 1988	American (1–0 AL)	2–1	Buffalo, New York	Pilot Field	Buffalo Bisons (AA)	19,500	
July 12, 1989	National (1–1 NL)	8–3	Columbus, Ohio	Cooper Stadium	Columbus Clippers (IL)	14,131	
July 11, 1990	National (2–1 NL)	8–5	Las Vegas, Nevada	Cashman Field	Las Vegas Stars (PCL)	10,323	
July 10, 1991	National (3–1 NL)	6–5	Louisville, Kentucky	Cardinal Stadium	Louisville Redbirds (AA)	20,725	
July 15, 1992	American (2–3 AL)	2–1	Richmond, Virginia	The Diamond	Richmond Braves (IL)	12,186	
July 14, 1993	National (4–2 NL)	14–3	Albuquerque, New Mexico	Albuquerque Sports Stadium	Albuquerque Dukes (PCL)	10,541	
July 13, 1994	National (5–2 NL)	8–5	Nashville, Tennessee	Herschel Greer Stadium	Nashville Sounds (AA)	11,601	
July 12, 1995	American (3–5 AL)	9–0	Moosic, Pennsylvania	Lackawanna County Stadium	Scranton/Wilkes-Barre Red Barons (IL)	10,965	
July 10, 1996	National (6–3 NL)	2–1	Salt Lake City, Utah	Franklin Quest Field	Salt Lake Buzz (PCL)	15,500	
July 9, 1997	American (4–6 AL)	5–3	Des Moines, Iowa	Sec Taylor Stadium	Iowa Cubs (AA)	11,183	

National League (6 wins)	American League (4 wins)

=== International League vs. Pacific Coast League (1998–2019) ===
Date	Winning league (All-time record)	Score	City	Ballpark	Host team (league)	Attendance	Ref.
July 8, 1998	International (1–0 IL)	8–4	Norfolk, Virginia	Harbor Park	Norfolk Tides (IL)	11,049	
July 14, 1999	Pacific Coast (1–1 PCL)	9–5	Metairie, Louisiana	Zephyr Field	New Orleans Zephyrs (PCL)	8,895	
July 12, 2000	Pacific Coast (2–1 PCL)	8–2	Rochester, New York	Frontier Field	Rochester Red Wings (IL)	12,810	
July 11, 2001	Pacific Coast (3–1 PCL)	9–5	Indianapolis, Indiana	Victory Field	Indianapolis Indians (IL)	15,868	
July 10, 2002	Pacific Coast (4–1 PCL)	5–0	Oklahoma City, Oklahoma	SBC Bricktown Ballpark	Oklahoma RedHawks (PCL)	11,343	
July 16, 2003	International (2–4 IL)	13–9	Memphis, Tennessee	AutoZone Park	Memphis Redbirds (PCL)	15,214	
July 14, 2004	International (3–4 IL)	4–3 (10 inn.)	Pawtucket, Rhode Island	McCoy Stadium	Pawtucket Red Sox (IL)	11,192	
July 13, 2005	Pacific Coast (5–3 PCL)	11–5	Sacramento, California	Raley Field	Sacramento River Cats (PCL)	14,414	
July 12, 2006	International (4–5 IL)	6–0	Toledo, Ohio	Fifth Third Field	Toledo Mud Hens (IL)	11,300	
July 11, 2007	International (5–5 IL)	7–5	Albuquerque, New Mexico	Isotopes Park	Albuquerque Isotopes (PCL)	12,367	
July 16, 2008	Pacific Coast (6–5 PCL)	6–5	Louisville, Kentucky	Louisville Slugger Field	Louisville Bats (IL)	13,131	
July 15, 2009	International (6–6 IL)	6–5	Portland, Oregon	PGE Park	Portland Beavers (PCL)	16,637	
July 14, 2010	International (7–6 IL)	2–1	Allentown, Pennsylvania	Coca-Cola Park	Lehigh Valley IronPigs (IL)	10,000	
July 13, 2011	International (8–6 IL)	3–0	Salt Lake City, Utah	Spring Mobile Ballpark	Salt Lake Bees (PCL)	12,439	
July 11, 2012	Pacific Coast (7–8 PCL)	3–0	Buffalo, New York	Coca-Cola Field	Buffalo Bisons (IL)	18,025	
July 17, 2013	International (9–7 IL)	4–3	Reno, Nevada	Aces Ballpark	Reno Aces (PCL)	10,135	
July 16, 2014	International (10–7 IL)	7–3	Durham, North Carolina	Durham Bulls Athletic Park	Durham Bulls (IL)	10,274	
July 15, 2015	International (11–7 IL)	4–3	Papillion, Nebraska	Werner Park	Omaha Storm Chasers (PCL)	9,023	
July 13, 2016	International (12–7 IL)	4–2	Charlotte, North Carolina	BB&T Ballpark	Charlotte Knights (IL)	10,386	
July 12, 2017	Pacific Coast (8–12 PCL)	6–4	Tacoma, Washington	Cheney Stadium	Tacoma Rainiers (PCL)	7,024	
July 11, 2018	Pacific Coast (9–12 PCL)	12–7	Columbus, Ohio	Huntington Park	Columbus Clippers (IL)	10,516	
July 10, 2019	Pacific Coast (10–12 PCL)	9–3	El Paso, Texas	Southwest University Park	El Paso Chihuahuas (PCL)	9,706	

International League (12 wins)	Pacific Coast League (10 wins)

=== Cancelled games (2020–2021) ===
Date	City	Ballpark	Host team (league)	Notes	Ref.
July 15, 2020	Moosic, Pennsylvania	PNC Field	Scranton/Wilkes-Barre RailRiders (IL)	Cancelled due to COVID-19 pandemic	
July 2021	Round Rock, Texas	Dell Diamond	Round Rock Express (AAAW)	Cancelled due to delayed season start	

== Awards ==
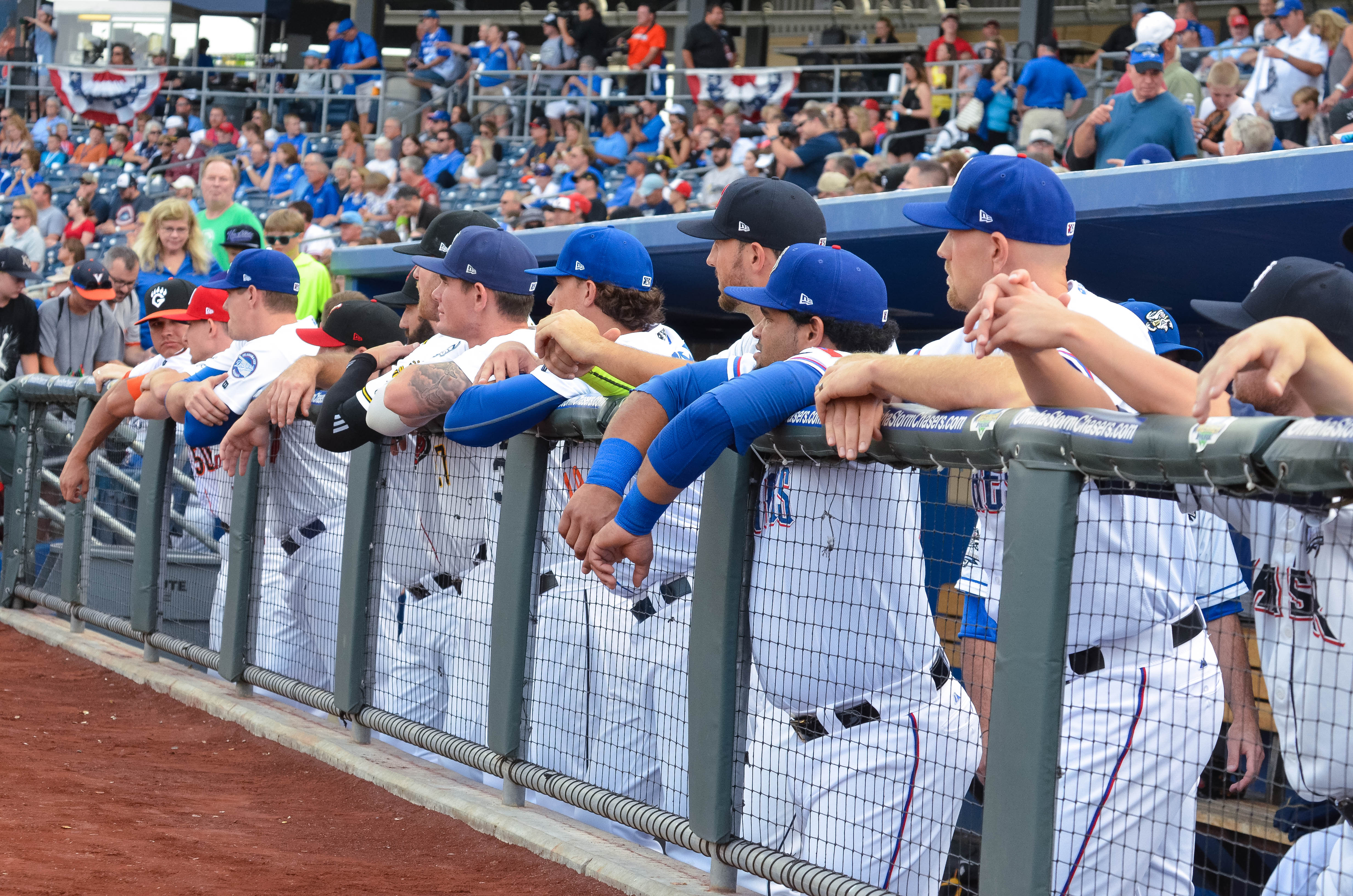
2015 PCL All-Stars in the dugout

The Most Valuable Player (MVP) awards at the Triple-A All-Star Game went by various names. One player was selected in the inaugural 1988 contest for the SportsTicker "Star of Stars" Award. From 1989 through 1997, the award was bestowed upon one player from each Triple-A league. For 2004, this award was renamed the TSN "Star of the Game" Award. From 2005 to 2016, it was known as the MiLB.com "Top Star" Award. From 2017 to 2019, it was the Bush's Beans "Top Star" Award.

Additional awards were given out to honor the best overall performance and/or best pitching performance from 2000 to 2008. From 2000 to 2003, two players were honored as the Maurice Lacroix/Lou Gehrig Players of the Game—one as "Player of the Game" and one as "Pitcher of the Game." In 2004, one player was selected as the Dodge Most Valuable Player. From 2005 to 2007, this award has given out as the Bank of America Most Valuable Player Award. The Bank of America Most Valuable Pitcher Award was given in 2008.

The teams with the most MVP winners (excluding additional awards from 2000 to 2008) were the Buffalo Bisons (IL), Oklahoma City RedHawks (PCL), and Richmond Braves (IL) with five MVPs each. The Columbus Clippers (IL), Durham Bulls (IL), Indianapolis Indians (IL), Las Vegas 51s (PCL), and Syracuse Chiefs (IL) are tied for second place with four MVPs each. The only player to win more than one regular MVP award is Luis Lopez, who won in 1994 with Richmond and in 1995 with Buffalo.

=== 1988–1997 ===
Year	AA MVP	IL MVP	PCL MVP	Ref.
1988	—	—	Ed Jurak (Tacoma Tigers, SS)	
1989	Scott Coolbaugh (Oklahoma City 89ers, 3B)	Mark Lemke (Richmond Braves, 2B)	Tom Drees (Vancouver Canadians, SP)	
1990	Juan González (Oklahoma City 89ers, DH)	Luis Sojo (Syracuse Chiefs, 2B/SS)	Eddie Williams (Las Vegas Stars, 3B)	
1991	Jim Olander (Denver Zephyrs, CF)	Steve Scarsone (Scranton/Wilkes-Barre Red Barons, DH)	Gary Cooper (Tucson Toros, 3B)	
1992	Jim Tatum (Denver Zephyrs, 3B)	Sam Militello (Columbus Clippers, RP)	Tim Salmon (Edmonton Trappers, RF)	
1993	Roy Smith (Buffalo Bisons, SP)	Ryan Klesko (Richmond Braves, 1B)	Billy Ashley (Albuquerque Dukes, RF)	
1994	Ray Durham (Nashville Sounds, 2B)	Luis Lopez (Richmond Braves, DH)	Paul Faries (Phoenix Firebirds, SS)	
1995	Luis Lopez (Buffalo Bisons, DH)	Howard Battle (Syracuse Chiefs, 3B)	Riccardo Ingram (Salt Lake Buzz, LF)	
1996	Brook Fordyce (Indianapolis Indians, C)	Huck Flener (Syracuse SkyChiefs, RP)	Todd Walker (Salt Lake Buzz, 2B)	
1997	Magglio Ordóñez (Nashville Sounds, CF)	Frank Catalanotto (Toledo Mud Hens, 2B)	Nate Minchey (Colorado Springs Sky Sox, RP)	

=== 1998–2019 ===
Year	IL MVP	PCL MVP	Other awards		Ref(s).	
Year	IL MVP	PCL MVP	Most Valuable Player	Most Valuable Pitcher	Ref(s).	
1998	Mike Lowell (Columbus Clippers, DH)	Terry Shumpert (Colorado Springs Sky Sox, SS)	Most Valuable Player	Most Valuable Pitcher	—	—
1999	Russell Branyan (Buffalo Bisons, DH)	Daryle Ward (New Orleans Zephyrs, 1B)	—	—		
2000	Javier De La Hoya (Rochester Red Wings, RP)	Joe Vitiello (Las Vegas Stars, 1B)	Joe Vitiello (PCL – Las Vegas Stars, 1B)	Javier De La Hoya (IL – Rochester Red Wings, RP)		
2001	Adam Dunn (Louisville Riverbats, LF)	Juan Thomas (Tacoma Rainiers, DH)	Adam Dunn (IL – Louisville Riverbats, LF)	Rubén Quevedo (PCL – Iowa Cubs, RP)		
2002	Doug Linton (Richmond Braves, SP)	Jack Cust (Colorado Springs Sky Sox, DH)	Jack Cust (PCL – Colorado Springs Sky Sox, DH)	Aaron Myette (PCL – Oklahoma RedHawks, SP)		
2003	Johnny Estrada (Richmond Braves, C)	Jason Jones (Oklahoma RedHawks, RF)	Johnny Estrada (IL – Richmond Braves, C)	Sam Marsonek (IL – Columbus Clippers, RP)		
2004	Midre Cummings (Durham Bulls, CF)	Dan Haren (Memphis Redbirds, SP)	Andy Phillips (IL – Columbus Clippers, 2B)	—		
2005	Edwin Encarnación (Louisville Bats, 3B)	Gerald Laird (Oklahoma RedHawks, C)	Gerald Laird (PCL – Oklahoma RedHawks, C)	—		
2006	Kevin Witt (Durham Bulls, 1B)	Rich Hill (Iowa Cubs, SP)	Kevin Witt (IL – Durham Bulls, 1B)	—		
2007	Timo Pérez (Toledo Mud Hens, LF/CF)	Valentino Pascucci (Albuquerque Isotopes, DH)	Timo Pérez (IL – Toledo Mud Hens, LF/CF)	—		
2008	Andrew McCutchen (Indianapolis Indians, CF)	Matthew Brown (Salt Lake Bees, 3B)	—	David Purcey (IL – Syracuse Chiefs, SP)		
2009	Erik Kratz (Indianapolis Indians, C)	Esteban Germán (Oklahoma City RedHawks, 3B)	—	—		
2010	Chase Lambin (Syracuse Chiefs, 3B/1B)	Thomas Diamond (Iowa Cubs, SP)	—	—		
2011	Russ Canzler (Durham Bulls, 3B)	David Cooper (Las Vegas 51s, 1B)	—	—		
2012	Matt Harvey (Buffalo Bisons, RP)	Wil Myers (Omaha Storm Chasers, LF)	—	—		
2013	Tony Sanchez (Indianapolis Indians, C)	Michael Wacha (Memphis Redbirds, RP)	—	—		
2014	Liam Hendriks (Buffalo Bisons, SP)	Chris Taylor (Tacoma Rainiers, SS)	—	—		
2015	Kyle Roller (Scranton/Wilkes-Barre RailRiders, 1B)	Peter O'Brien (Reno Aces, RF)	—	—		
2016	Chris Marrero (Pawtucket Red Sox, RF)	Travis Taijeron (Las Vegas 51s, DH)	—	—		
2017	Richie Shaffer (Columbus Clippers, DH)	Renato Núñez (Nashville Sounds, LF)	—	—		
2018	Kean Wong (Durham Bulls, 2B)	Josh Fuentes (Albuquerque Isotopes, 3B)	—	—		
2019	Eric Haase (Columbus Clippers, C)	Ty France (El Paso Chihuahuas, 3B)	—	—		

== Notable All-Stars ==
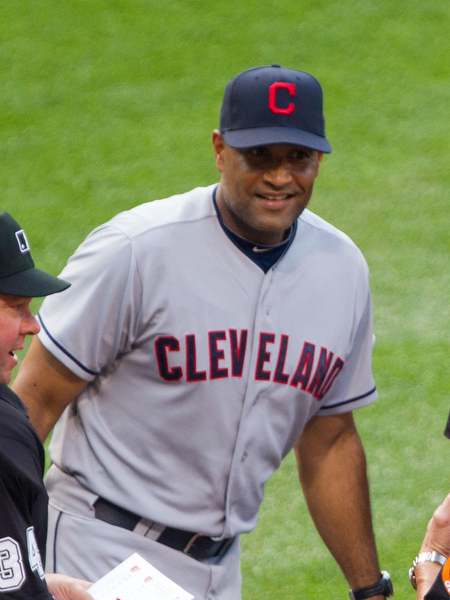
Sandy Alomar Jr. (shown) and Ramón Martínez were the first two Triple-A All-Star participants to play in a Major League All-Star Game.

As of the 2023 Major League Baseball All-Star Game, of the more than 1,200 players that participated in the Triple-A All-Star Game, 118 have also been selected for the MLB All-Star Game. These players are:

- Ozzie Albies
- Sandy Alomar Jr.
- Yonder Alonso
- Jesus Aguilar
- Garret Anderson
- Bronson Arroyo
- Jay Bell
- Ronnie Belliard
- José Berríos
- Hank Blalock
- Aaron Boone
- Bret Boone
- Jackie Bradley Jr.
- Jeromy Burnitz
- Jeff Conine
- Ron Coomer
- Garrett Cooper
- Scott Cooper
- Joey Cora
- Jesse Crain
- Carl Crawford
- Joe Crede
- Jake Cronenworth
- Nelson Cruz
- Michael Cuddyer
- Elías Díaz
- Josh Donaldson
- Justin Duchscherer
- Adam Dunn
- Ray Durham
- Adam Duvall
- Damion Easley
- Edwin Encarnación
- Alcides Escobar
- Johnny Estrada
- Carl Everett
- Steve Finley
- Darrin Fletcher
- Ty France
- Zac Gallen
- Carlos García
- Brian Giles
- Álex González
- Juan González
- Alex Gordon
- Dan Haren
- Corey Hart
- Matt Harvey
- Todd Helton
- Liam Hendriks
- Ken Hill
- Orlando Hudson
- Todd Hundley
- Jason Isringhausen
- Gregg Jefferies
- Derek Jeter
- Lance Johnson
- Adam Jones
- Chipper Jones
- Howie Kendrick
- Ian Kinsler
- Jason Kipnis
- Andrew Kittredge
- Ryan Klesko
- Paul Konerko
- Bryan LaHair
- Paul Lo Duca
- Kenny Lofton
- Javy López
- Mark Loretta
- Mike Lowell
- Ryan Ludwick
- Ketel Marte
- Starling Marte
- Pedro Martínez
- Ramón Martínez
- Tino Martinez
- Andrew McCutchen
- Nate McLouth
- Devin Mesoraco
- Justin Morneau
- Brandon Moss
- Edward Mujica
- Wil Myers
- Denny Neagle
- Eduardo Núñez
- José Offerman
- Magglio Ordóñez
- Joc Pederson
- Jhonny Peralta
- Mike Piazza
- Jorge Polanco
- Rick Reed
- Henry Rodríguez
- Taylor Rogers
- Brent Rooker
- José Rosado
- Gary Sánchez
- Joe Saunders
- Marco Scutaro
- Richie Sexson
- George Sherrill
- Alfonso Soriano
- Geovany Soto
- Ed Sprague
- Chris Taylor
- Jim Thome
- Mark Trumbo
- Kyle Tucker
- Chase Utley
- Greg Vaughn
- Daniel Vogelbach
- Joey Votto
- Michael Wacha
- Bob Wickman
- Bernie Williams
- Kirby Yates
- Dmitri Young

== Home Run Derby ==
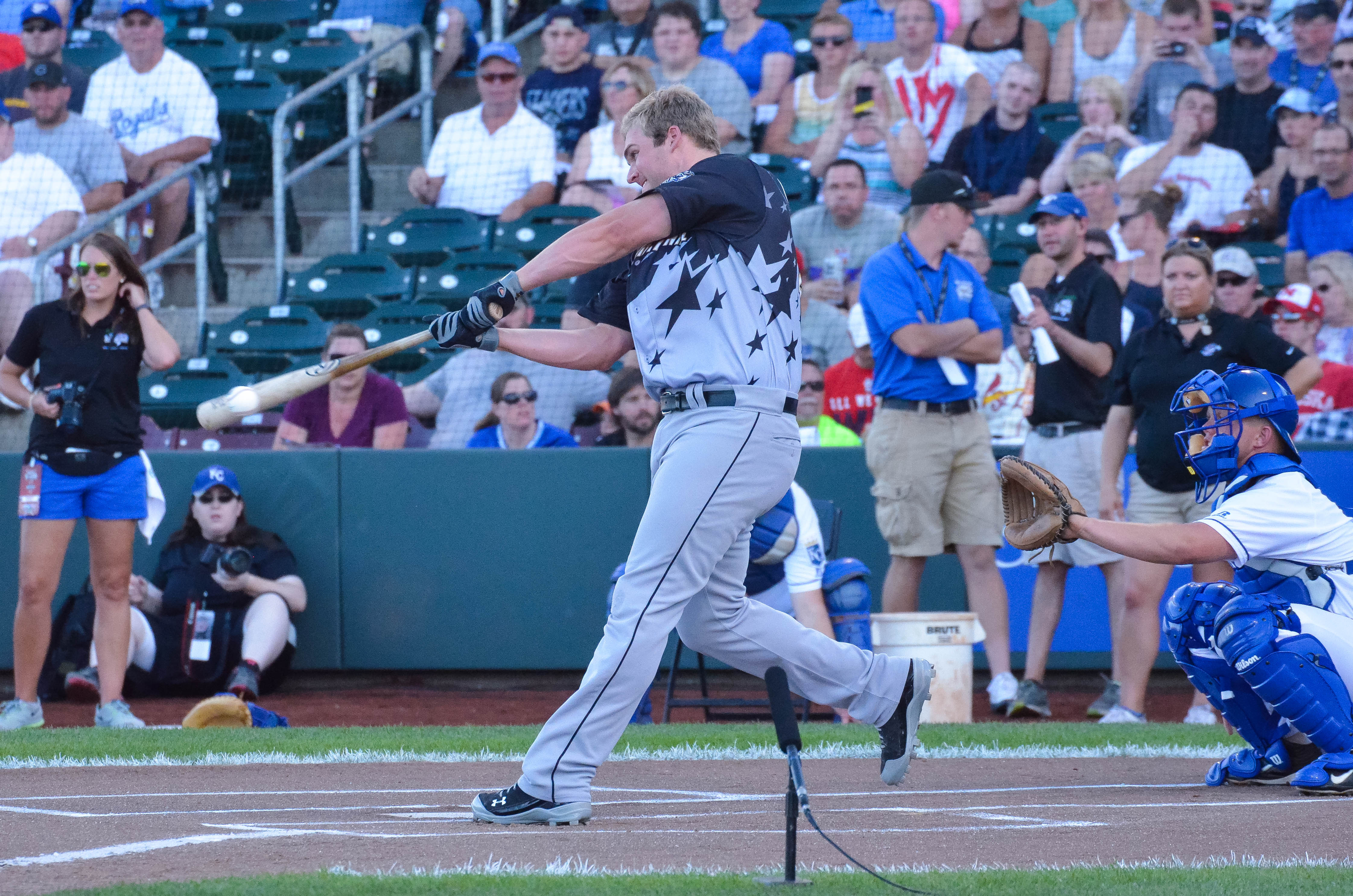
Matt Davidson, winner of the 2013 Triple-A Home Run Derby, hitting in the 2015 contest

The Triple-A Home Run Derby was an annual home run hitting contest usually held two days before the Triple-A All-Star Game. Though the rules changed from year to year, the 2019 iteration featured eight players—four of the top home-run-hitters from each league—competing to see who could hit the most home runs within a time limit. The single-elimination tournament consisted of three rounds. The first two rounds determined which of the four hitters from each league would compete in the final round against the winner from the other league.

Fifteen contests were won by Pacific Coast League players, while 13 were won by International League players, two by American Association players, and one by a retired player. Rob Stratton (2003 and 2007) and Chad Huffman (2009 and 2018) were the only participants to win the derby twice. Juan González is the only player to win the Triple-A Home Run Derby and the Major League Baseball Home Run Derby. He won the Triple-A version in 1990 and the MLB version in 1993.

=== Winners ===
Year	Winner	Team	League	Ref.
1988	Bob Geren	Columbus Clippers	IL	
1989	Cancelled due to rain			
1990	Juan González	Oklahoma City 89ers	AA	
1991	Gary Cooper	Tucson Toros	PCL	
1991	Lee Stevens	Edmonton Trappers	PCL	
1992	Not held			
1993	Ryan Thompson	Norfolk Tides	IL	
1994	Scott Coolbaugh	Louisville Redbirds	AA	
1995	Ron Coomer	Albuquerque Dukes	PCL	
1996	Greg Pirkl	Tacoma Rainiers	PCL	
1997	Todd Helton	Colorado Springs Sky Sox	PCL	
1998	Willis Otáñez	Rochester Red Wings	IL	
1999	Scott Sheldon	Oklahoma RedHawks	PCL	
2000	Luis Raven	Calgary Cannons	PCL	
2001	Chris Latham	Syracuse SkyChiefs	IL	
2002	Brandon Larson	Louisville Bats	IL	
2003	Rob Stratton	Albuquerque Isotopes	PCL	
2004	Bucky Jacobsen	Tacoma Rainiers	PCL	
2005	Mitch Jones	Colorado Springs Sky Sox	PCL	
2006	Andy Marte	Buffalo Bisons	IL	
2007	Rob Stratton	Retired	—	
2008	Jamie D'Antona	Tucson Sidewinders	PCL	
2009	Chad Huffman	Portland Beavers	PCL	
2010	Dan Johnson	Durham Bulls	IL	
2011	Stefan Gartrell	Gwinnett Braves	IL	
2012	Valentino Pascucci	Buffalo Bisons	IL	
2013	Matt Davidson	Reno Aces	PCL	
2014	Allan Dykstra	Las Vegas 51s	PCL	
2015	Dariel Álvarez	Norfolk Tides	IL	
2016	Chris Marrero	Pawtucket Red Sox	IL	
2017	Bryce Brentz	Pawtucket Red Sox	IL	
2018	Chad Huffman	Toledo Mud Hens	IL	
2019	Yasmany Tomás	Reno Aces	PCL	

== Broadcasts ==
Each Triple-A All-Star Game was broadcast on radio across various regional and national sports networks. The 1988 and 1989 events were televised on ESPN. It was carried on Prime Network from 1990 to 1992. The 1993 game was not televised, but it returned to SportSouth/Prime Network in 1994. ESPN2 broadcast the game from 1995 to 2009. It aired on MLB Network from 2010 to 2019.

== See also ==
- Double-A All-Star Game
