= Chris Latham (baseball) =

American baseball player (born 1973)

- Outfielder
- Born: May 26, 1973 (age 52); Coeur d'Alene, Idaho, U.S.
- Batted: Switch Threw: Right

Professional debut
- MLB: April 12, 1997, for the Minnesota Twins
- NPB: May 13, 2003, for the Yomiuri Giants

Last appearance
- MLB: April 18, 2003, for the New York Yankees
- NPB: October 7, 2003, for the Yomiuri Giants

MLB statistics
- Batting average: .202
- Home runs: 3
- Runs batted in: 19

NPB statistics
- Batting average: .221
- Home runs: 7
- Runs batted in: 17
- Stats at Baseball Reference

Teams
- Minnesota Twins (1997–1999); Toronto Blue Jays (2001); New York Yankees (2003); Yomiuri Giants (2003)

Christopher Joseph Latham (born May 26, 1973) is an American former professional outfielder. He is a switch hitter who is 6'0" tall, weighs 195 pounds, and throws right-handed.

== Career ==
Latham played baseball at Basic High School in Henderson, Nevada, and in 1991 the Los Angeles Dodgers selected him in the June amateur draft, taking him with the 300th overall pick as part of the draft's 11th round. Latham enjoyed a breakout season with the Yakima Bears of the Northwest League in 1994, setting a club record with a .340 batting average. Latham also made the Northwest League's All-Star team that season, establishing himself as a prospect.

The Major League Baseball Players Association went on strike late in 1994, and as a result major league organizations attempted to field teams of replacement players in the spring training before the 1995 season. Latham was one of the Dodgers' replacement players that spring, but the two sides reached a deal before any regular-season replacement games were played.

On October 30, 1995, Latham was chosen as the player to be named later in a deal that had been concluded on July 31. Los Angeles received pitchers Kevin Tapani and Mark Guthrie from the Minnesota Twins, with Latham, Ron Coomer, Greg Hansell and José Parra going the other way. Latham made his major league debut with the Twins on April 12, 1997, appearing as a pinch runner for Todd Walker in an 11-6 win over the Kansas City Royals. He spent parts of the next three seasons with the Twins, but struggled to establish himself in the major leagues, and was traded to the Colorado Rockies for Scott Randall on December 7, 1999.

Latham spent all of the 2000 season at the AAA level, then signed with the Toronto Blue Jays organization as a minor league free agent. He enjoyed his most successful major league season with the Blue Jays in 2001, batting .274 with a .369 on-base percentage and a .425 slugging percentage in 73 at bats. After another season in AAA, he spent a brief time with the New York Yankees in 2003, then signed with Japan's Yomiuri Giants after being designated for assignment.

Latham spent the 2005 season with the independent Bridgeport Bluefish of the Atlantic League. Most recently, he represented the United States in the 2005 Baseball World Cup, as one of four outfielders on the American team.
