= Chris Latham =

Chris Latham may refer to:

- Chris Latham (baseball) (born 1973), American baseball player
- Chris Latham (musician), British musician
- Chris Latham (rugby union) (born 1975), Australian rugby union footballer
- Christopher Latham (born 1994), British racing cyclist

== See also ==
- Christine Latham (born 1981), Canadian soccer player
- Christopher Latham Sholes (1819-1890), American inventor
