= Matt Davidson (baseball) =

American baseball player (born 1991)

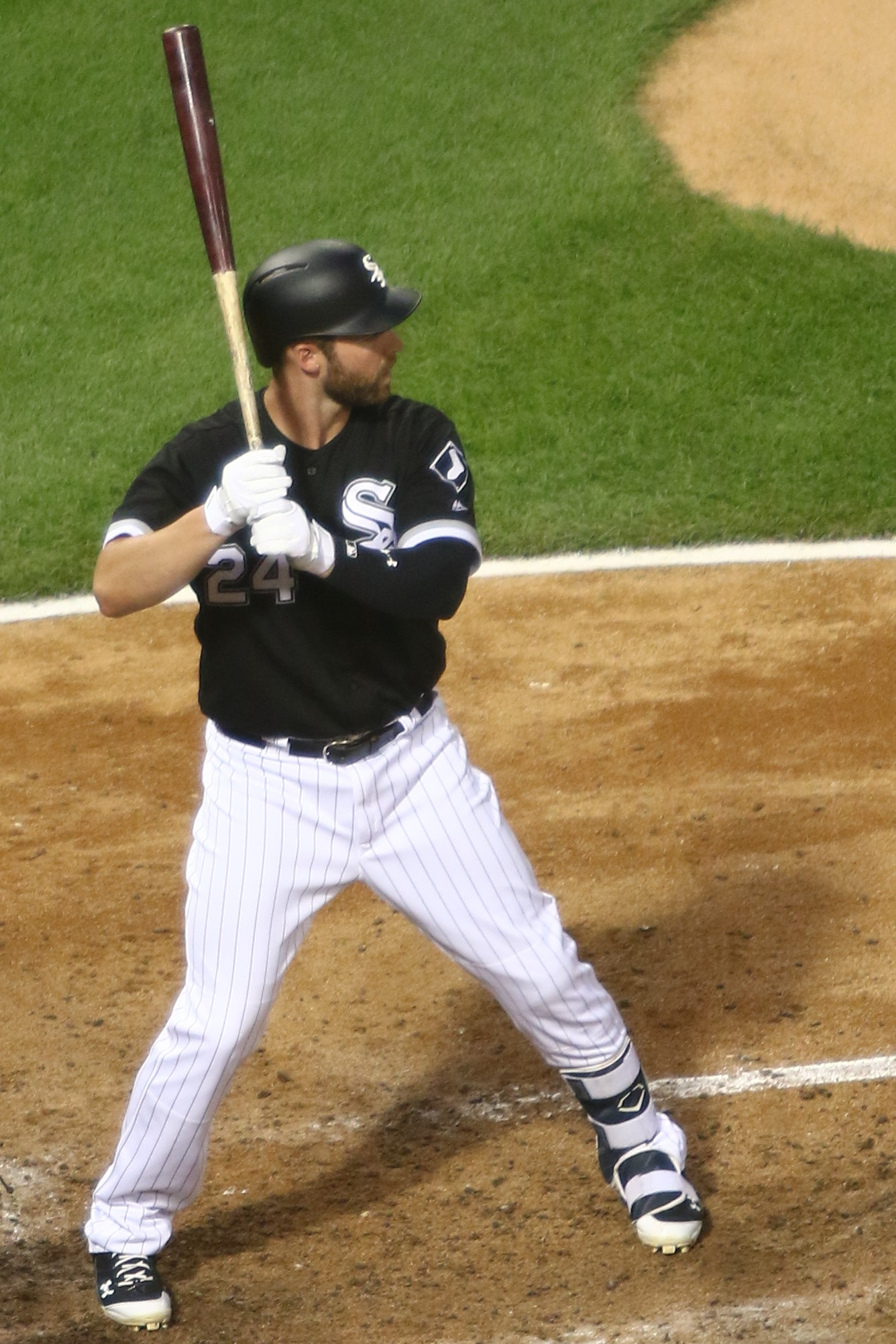
- Davidson with the Chicago White Sox in 2017

Kiwoom Heroes – No. 34
- Third baseman / First baseman
- Born: March 26, 1991 (age 35); Yucaipa, California, U.S.
- Bats: Right Throws: Right

Professional debut
- MLB: August 11, 2013, for the Arizona Diamondbacks
- NPB: March 31, 2023, for the Hiroshima Toyo Carp
- KBO: March 23, 2024, for the NC Dinos

MLB statistics (through 2022 season)
- Batting average: .220
- Home runs: 54
- Runs batted in: 157

NPB statistics (through 2023 season)
- Batting average: .210
- Home runs: 19
- Runs batted in: 44

KBO statistics (through 2026 season)
- Batting average: .299
- Home runs: 110
- Runs batted in: 305
- Stats at Baseball Reference

Teams
- Arizona Diamondbacks (2013); Chicago White Sox (2016–2018); Cincinnati Reds (2020); Arizona Diamondbacks (2022); Oakland Athletics (2022); Hiroshima Toyo Carp (2023); NC Dinos (2024–2026); Kiwoom Heroes (2026–present)

Matthew Glen Davidson (born March 26, 1991) is an American professional baseball infielder for the Kiwoom Heroes of the KBO League. He has previously played in Major League Baseball (MLB) for the Arizona Diamondbacks, Chicago White Sox, Cincinnati Reds, and Oakland Athletics, in Nippon Professional Baseball (NPB) for the Hiroshima Toyo Carp, and in the KBO for the NC Dinos.

== Career ==
Davidson attended Yucaipa High School in Yucaipa, California. He committed to attend the University of Southern California (USC) on a scholarship to play college baseball for the USC Trojans baseball team. After graduating from high school, the Arizona Diamondbacks selected Davidson in the first round of the 2009 Major League Baseball draft. Davidson signed with the Diamondbacks, forgoing his college commitment.

=== Arizona Diamondbacks ===
Davidson appeared in 72 games in 2009 for the Yakima Bears. In 2010, Davidson played for the South Bend Silver Hawks of the Single–A Midwest League, and hit 16 home runs. He was promoted to the Visalia Rawhide of the High–A California League later that season. Prior to the 2011 season, Davidson was ranked as the 99th best prospect by Baseball America. He played for Visalia in 2011. Prior to 2012, he was ranked 97th. That year, he played for the Mobile BayBears of the Double–A Southern League.

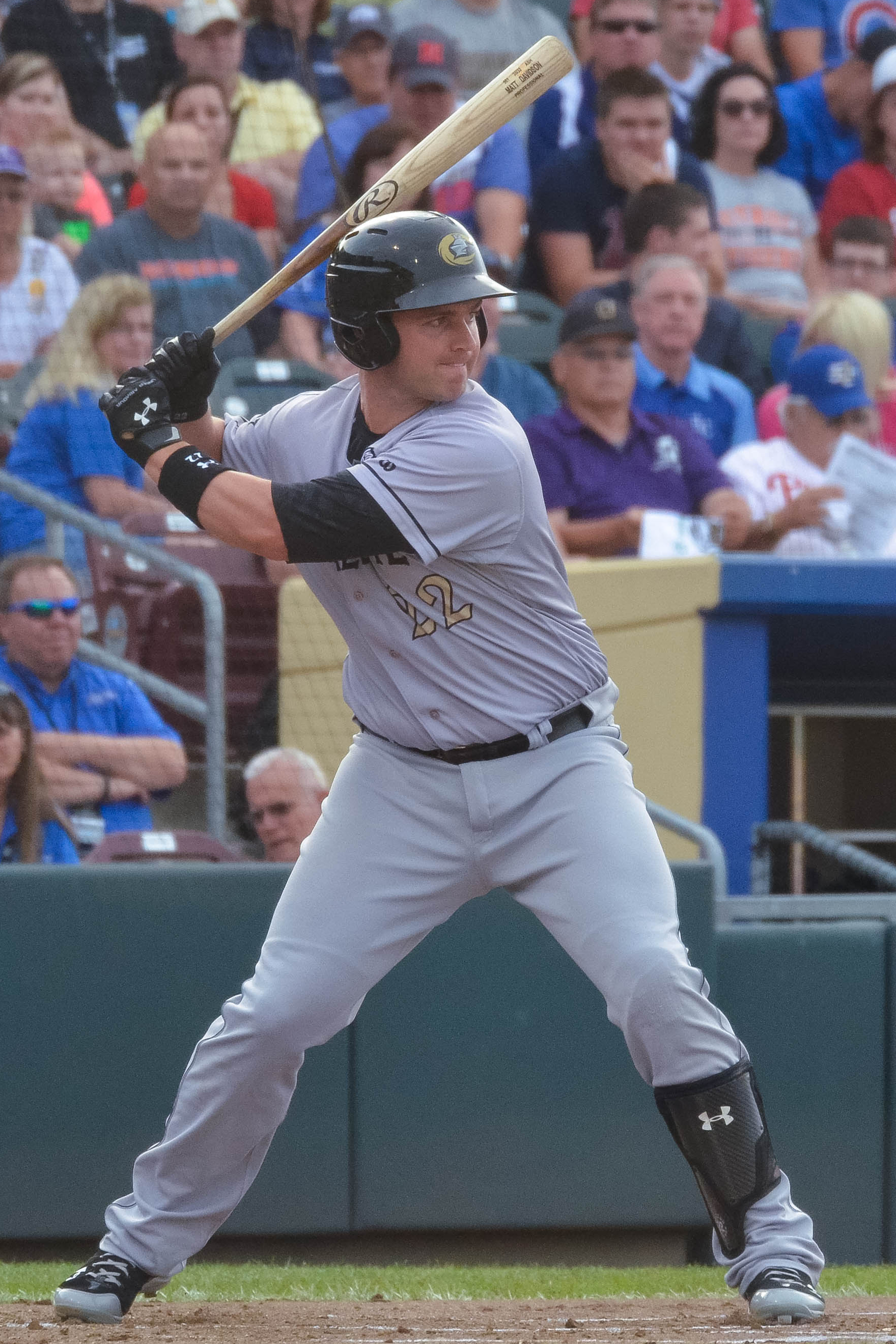
Davidson at the 2015 Triple-A All-Star Game

Davidson began the 2013 season with the Reno Aces of the Triple–A Pacific Coast League. He appeared in the All-Star Futures Game in 2013, and was named the game's most valuable player after he hit a go-ahead two-run home run. A day later, he won the 2013 Triple-A Home Run Derby, hitting 11 home runs across the three rounds, including seven in the first round, to surpass Brock Peterson's 10. The Diamondbacks promoted Davidson to the major leagues on August 11, 2013. He debuted that night with a 1-for-3 performance as an injury substitute for Cody Ross.

=== Chicago White Sox ===
On December 16, 2013, the Diamondbacks traded Davidson to the Chicago White Sox for pitcher Addison Reed. He played for the Charlotte Knights of the Triple–A International League in 2014 and 2015. He began the 2016 season with Charlotte and was promoted to the major leagues on June 30, 2016. In his first game with the White Sox, he fractured his foot.

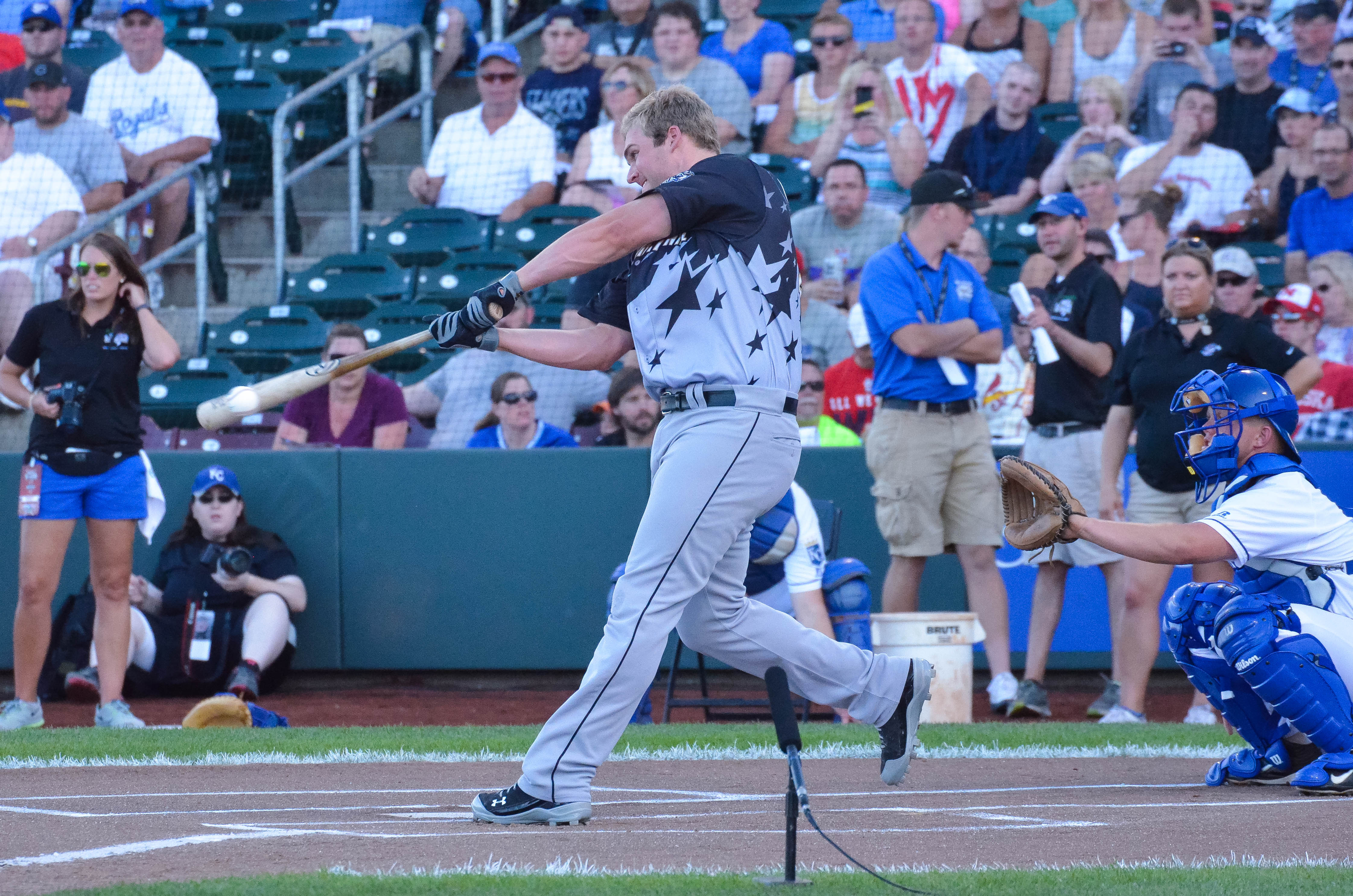
Davidson at the 2015 Triple-A Home Run Derby

On April 6, 2017, Davidson hit his first career-triple at his first at-bat since breaking his foot in 2016 against the Detroit Tigers. He hit his first home-run for the White Sox, a three-run blast in the fourth inning. He finished the game logging two hits, two runs, and three RBIs.

On June 13, 2017, Davidson hit his first-career Grand Slam against the Baltimore Orioles with the Chicago White Sox. For the season, he had the highest strikeout percentage among major leaguers against right-handed pitchers (39.9%).

On 2018 Opening Day against the Kansas City Royals on March 29, 2018, Davidson hit three home runs. Davidson became just the fourth player in Major League Baseball History to hit three home runs in a single game on opening day. The White Sox won 14–7.

=== Texas Rangers ===
On February 7, 2019, Davidson signed a minor league contract with the Texas Rangers. He was assigned to the Triple-A Nashville Sounds for the 2019 season, hitting .264/.325/.527 with 33 home runs and 101 RBI. Davidson elected free agency following the season on November 4.

=== Cincinnati Reds ===
On January 2, 2020, Davidson signed a minor league deal with the Cincinnati Reds. On July 24, Davidson had his contract selected to the 40-man roster, and same day, he was the starting designated hitter, making his Reds debut on Opening Day against the Detroit Tigers. However, the next day, he was placed the 10-day injured list for his testing positive for COVID-19. The test ended up being a false positive. On September 30, Davidson was selected back to the 40-man roster. On October 14, Davidson was outrighted off of the 40-man roster. Davidson elected free agency two days later on October 16.

=== Los Angeles Dodgers ===
On February 16, 2021, Davidson signed a minor league contract with the Los Angeles Dodgers organization that included an invitation to Spring Training. He spent the entire season with the Triple-A Oklahoma City Dodgers, where he hit .294 in 84 games with 28 home runs and 81 RBI.

=== Arizona Diamondbacks (second stint) ===
On November 22, 2021, Davidson signed a minor league deal with the Arizona Diamondbacks, and on April 21, 2022, his contract was purchased from the minor leagues by the Diamondbacks. Davidson appeared in 5 games for Arizona, going 1-for-10 with 3 walks. He was designated for assignment on May 2, when active rosters shrunk from 28 to 26.

=== Oakland Athletics ===
On May 9, 2022, Davidson signed a minor league deal with the Oakland Athletics and was assigned to the Triple-A Las Vegas Aviators. On June 7, Davidson was selected to the active roster. He appeared in 8 games, going 4-for-24 with one home run and 2 RBI. Davidson was designated for assignment on June 21. He cleared waivers and was sent outright to Triple–A Las Vegas the next day. Davidson elected free agency on October 6.

=== Hiroshima Toyo Carp ===
On November 17, 2022, Davidson signed with the Hiroshima Toyo Carp of Nippon Professional Baseball. He made his NPB debut on March 31, 2023. The next day, he became the first non-Japanese player for the Carp to hit a home run as his first NPB hit since Xavier Batista in 2017. On April 28, Davidson hit a home run that hit a Kirin Beer billboard above the left field seats at the Tokyo Dome. The feat earned him one million Japanese yen and one year worth of Kirin Beer, which he said he would distribute among his teammates. In 112 games for the Carp, Davidson batted .210/.273/.425 with 19 home runs and 44 RBI. On November 16, the Carp announced that they would not give Davidson a contract for the 2024 season, and he became a free agent.

=== NC Dinos ===
On January 11, 2024, Davidson signed a one–year, $1 million contract with the NC Dinos of the KBO League. In 131 appearances for the Dinos, he batted .306/.370/.633 with 46 home runs and 119 RBI.

On November 28, 2024, Davidson re–signed with the Dinos on a $1.5 million contract that includes a $1.7 million club option for the 2026 season. In 112 appearances for the team in 2025, he slashed .293/.346/.619 with 36 home runs and 97 RBI.

On December 11, 2025, Davidson again re-signed with the Dinos, on a one-year, $1.3 million contract. In 63 appearances for the team, he batted .290/.369/.457 with eight home runs and 40 RBI. On June 26, 2026, Davidson was waived by the Dinos.

=== Kiwoom Heroes ===
On June 27, 2026, Davidson was signed by the Kiwoom Heroes of the KBO League after being released by the NC Dinos.

On November 19, 2026, Davidson re-signed with the Heroes on a one-year contract with $1.1 million

== Personal life ==
Davidson and his wife, Julianne, have two children: a daughter who was born November 2014, and a son born July 2016. It was announced on July 25, 2020, that Davidson had tested (false) positive for COVID-19 one day after starting in the season opener.
