= Ed Jurak =

American baseball player (born 1957)

- Infielder
- Born: October 24, 1957 (age 68); Los Angeles, California, U.S.
- Batted: Right Threw: Right

MLB debut
- June 30, 1982, for the Boston Red Sox

Last MLB appearance
- June 26, 1989, for the San Francisco Giants

MLB statistics
- Batting average: .265
- Home runs: 1
- Runs batted in: 33
- Stats at Baseball Reference

Teams
- Boston Red Sox (1982–1985); Oakland Athletics (1988); San Francisco Giants (1989)

Edward James Jurak (born October 24, 1957) is an American former professional baseball player. He played in Major League Baseball for parts of six seasons, from 1982 through 1989. Jurak played for the Boston Red Sox from 1982 to 1985, the Oakland Athletics in 1988 and the San Francisco Giants in 1989. After Boston released him in spring training of 1986, he played on the independent San Jose Bees of the California League that season. Jurak spent 1987 in the minor leagues for the Texas Rangers organization before returning to the big leagues in 1988. One of the finest moments of Jurak's career occurred during the Triple-A All-Star Game in 1988. The game was nationally televised as a way to introduce the baseball audience to the best prospects in the sport. That night, Jurak, at the age of 30 and hitting .314 for Tacoma, the top farm club of the Oakland A's, tripled and scored in the ninth inning as the American League defeated the National League 2-1. The National League had tied the game at one via a home run hit by Gregg Jefferies.

Jurak was a utility player, playing in the field at shortstop, first, second, third base, and as an outfielder in his major-league appearances. As a minor leaguer, Jurak won the 1981 Eastern League batting title with the Bristol Red Sox (AA affiliate of the Boston Red Sox).

Because of his Croatian ancestry, Jurak's 1989 Giants teammates nicknamed him "Croatian Man" in the clubhouse.
