= Ron Coomer =

American baseball player and analyst (born 1966)

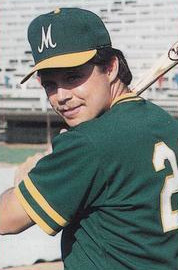
- Coomer in 1988
- First baseman / Third baseman
- Born: November 18, 1966 (age 59); Crest Hill, Illinois, U.S.
- Batted: Right Threw: Right

MLB debut
- August 1, 1995, for the Minnesota Twins

Last MLB appearance
- September 28, 2003, for the Los Angeles Dodgers

MLB statistics
- Batting average: .274
- Home runs: 92
- Runs batted in: 449
- Stats at Baseball Reference

Teams
- Minnesota Twins (1995–2000); Chicago Cubs (2001); New York Yankees (2002); Los Angeles Dodgers (2003)

Career highlights and awards
- All-Star (1999)

Ronald Bryan Coomer (born November 18, 1966), nicknamed "Coom Dawg", is an American former first baseman and third baseman in Major League Baseball and the current color analyst and play-by-play broadcaster for the Chicago Cubs radio on WSCR 670 AM. Coomer had a nine-year major league career from 1995 to 2003 playing for the Minnesota Twins, New York Yankees, Chicago Cubs, and Los Angeles Dodgers. He was elected to the American League All-Star team in 1999 while with the Twins.

During his baseball career he opened up a baseball facility in Orland Park, Illinois, called C.F. Swingtown Baseball Academy, which is no longer owned by Coomer.

== Baseball career ==
Coomer was drafted by the Oakland Athletics in the 14th round of the 1987 amateur draft. After the 1990 season, he was released by the A's. He was signed by the Chicago White Sox on March 18, 1991. In 1993, he was traded to the Los Angeles Dodgers for Isidro Márquez. After two seasons in the minors, Coomer was traded to the Minnesota Twins with Greg Hansell and José Parra for Mark Guthrie and Kevin Tapani.

Coomer spent five seasons with the Twins, with whom he made the All-Star team in 1999. After the emergence of third baseman Corey Koskie, Coomer began to lose playing time. In his last year as a Twin, 2000, Koskie started the majority of the games at third and Coomer was shifted to first base.

In 2001, Coomer signed a free-agent contract with the Chicago Cubs. He hit .261/.316/.390 in his only year in Chicago before becoming a free agent.

Coomer signed a one-year deal with the New York Yankees in 2002 as a reserve third baseman. He started 26 games for the Yankees at third. He joined the Dodgers the next year, where he mainly played first base. Coomer's offensive production dipped to .240/.299/.368 and after that year he retired from baseball.

== Broadcasting ==
In 2012 and 2013, Coomer was a color analyst for Fox Sports North, the Minnesota Twins' primary television broadcaster. He also regularly appeared on KTWN-FM, the primary radio affiliate for the Minnesota Twins. On December 12, 2013, it was reported that Coomer would succeed Keith Moreland as the analyst on the Chicago Cubs Radio Network. He is partnered with longtime broadcaster Pat Hughes.

Preceded by Keith Moreland	Chicago Cubs Radio Color Commentator; 2014–present	Incumbent
