= Gary Cooper (third baseman) =

American baseball player (born 1964)

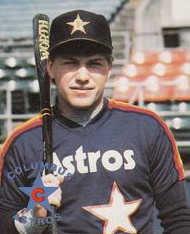
- Cooper in 1988
- Third baseman
- Born: August 13, 1964 (age 61); Lynwood, California, U.S.
- Batted: Right Threw: Right

MLB debut
- September 15, 1991, for the Houston Astros

Last MLB appearance
- October 6, 1991, for the Houston Astros

MLB statistics
- Batting average: .250
- Home runs: 0
- Runs batted in: 2
- Stats at Baseball Reference

Teams
- Houston Astros (1991)

Gary Clifton Cooper (born August 13, 1964) is an American former third baseman who played with the Houston Astros of Major League Baseball (MLB).

== Early life ==
Cooper was born in Lynwood, California. He was named after the actor Gary Cooper.

== College career ==
Cooper attended Brigham Young University, where he is a member of their Hall of Fame. He was a starter on their nationally ranked #1 team in 1983 and he started nearly every of his 292 games as a Cougar, helping fashion records of 54–11 in 1983, 42–17 in 1984, 44–29 in 1985 and 34–18–2 in 1986. Included in those records were NCAA postseason tournament appearances in Tempe, Arizona, in 1983 and Fresno, California, in 1985, Western Athletic Conference crowns both those seasons, and WAC division titles in 1983, 1984 and 1985. The product of Mountain View High in Orem, Utah set a BYU record of five stolen bases in one game in 1984.

He was named All-America first-team in 1986 and 1985. As a senior, he was named WAC Player of the Year. He was a three-time All-WAC selection. Cooper finished second in NCAA career runs scored (320), fourth in NCAA in career hits (349), sixth in NCAA in career total bases (612) and set WAC and BYU career records for runs, hits, RBI, stolen bases and walks.

Batting a collegiate career .409, he was drafted in the seventh round by the Houston Astros in 1986. Cooper led the Anchorage Glacier Pilots to a third-place finish in the National Baseball Congress All-American Tournament in Wichita, Kansas in the summer of 1985.

== Professional career ==
Cooper was 27 years old when he broke into the big leagues on September 15, 1991, with the Houston Astros. The majority of his playing time was on the Triple-A level with teams like the Tucson Toros. He also played in the Cincinnati Reds and Pittsburgh Pirates organizations. He played in several Triple-A All-Star Games during his 10-year pro career and was named MVP of one of those games as well as being voted Outstanding Player of the Year in the Pacific Coast League. Cooper had over 1,000 hits during his professional career.

== After baseball ==
Cooper currently lives in Utah with his wife April and their 4 children, Taylor, Nikki, Camden and Shea. Camden and Shea are named for MLB ballparks, Camden Yards (Baltimore) and Shea Stadium (New York), even though Cooper played only nine MLB games, none of them in Baltimore or New York.
