= Kyle Roller =

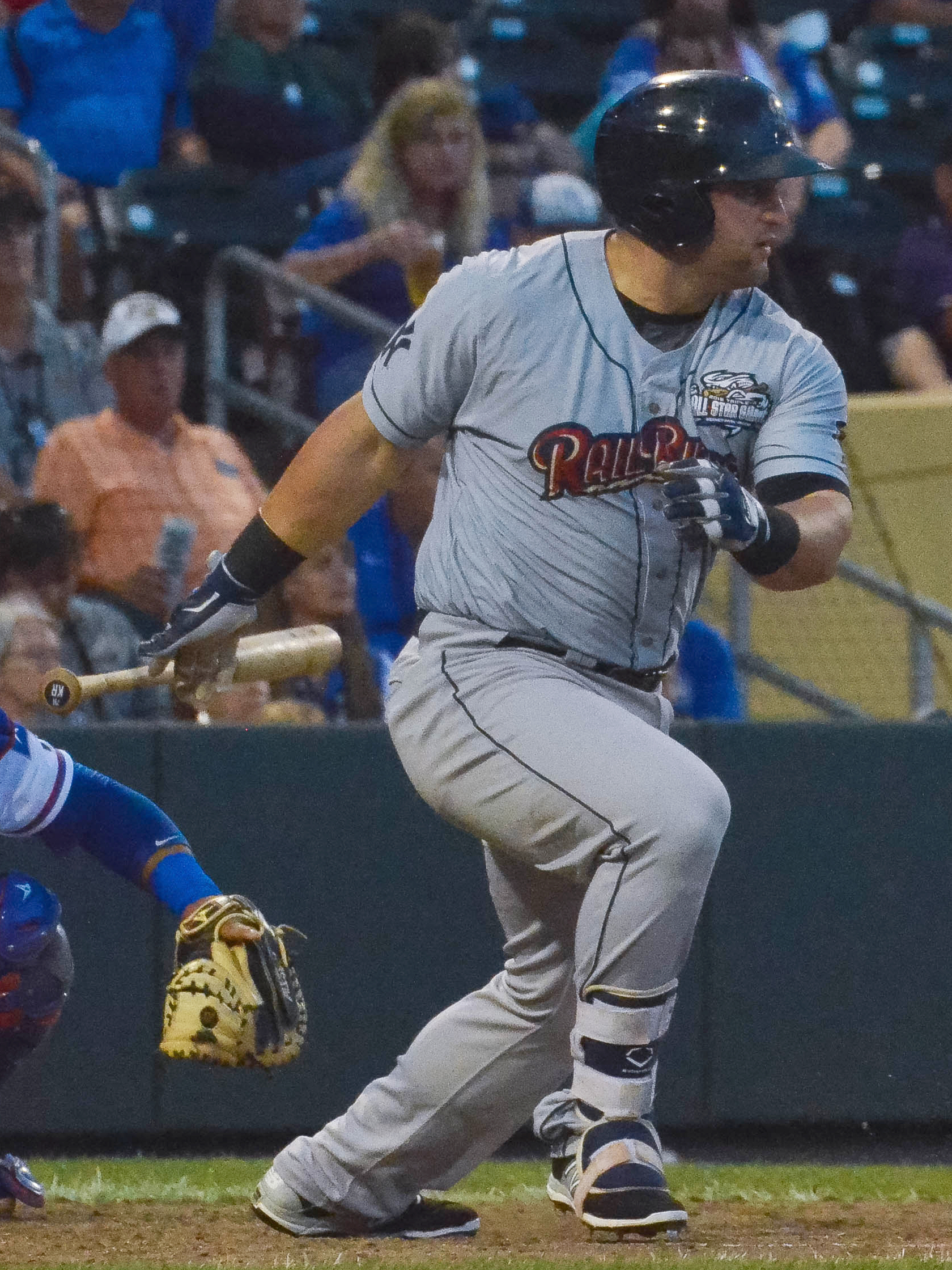
- Roller, during his tenure with the Scranton/Wilkes-Barre RailRiders, at 2015 Triple-A All-Star Game
- First baseman
- Born: March 27, 1988 (age 37); Pinehurst, North Carolina
- Bats: Left Throws: Right
- Stats at Baseball Reference

Kyle Matthew Roller (born March 27, 1988) is an American professional baseball first baseman.

== Career ==
=== Amateur ===
Roller played college baseball at East Carolina University from 2007 to 2010. In 2008 and 2009, he played collegiate summer baseball in the Cape Cod Baseball League (CCBL) for the Bourne Braves, and was named both the league MVP and playoff MVP in 2009, leading the Braves to their first league title. He was inducted into the CCBL Hall of Fame in 2016.

He was drafted by the Oakland Athletics in the 47th round of the 2009 Major League Baseball draft, but did not sign and returned to East Carolina for his senior season. As a senior, he was named a first-team All-American by the American Baseball Coaches Association (ABCA) after hitting .324/.531/.606 with 12 home runs and 48 runs batted in (RBI). He finished his four-year career batting .319/.459/.584 with 51 home runs and 203 RBI in 223 games.

=== Professional ===
Roller was drafted by the New York Yankees in the eighth round of the 2010 Major League Baseball draft. He made his professional debut that season with the Staten Island Yankees. During his first season he hit .272/.367/.402 with five home runs in 67 games. Roller started 2011 with the Charleston RiverDogs. He was promoted to the Tampa Yankees during the season after hitting .305/.379/.545 with nine home runs in 50 games with Charleston. Overall, he hit .284/.371/.482 and 16 home runs in 110 games between the two levels.

Roller spent the entire 2012 season with Tampa. In 121 games he hit .266 with a .828 on-base plus slugging (OPS) and 18 home runs. He was promoted to the Double-A Trenton Thunder for 2013. In 124 games, he had a .774 OPS and 17 home runs.

Roller returned to Trenton to start the 2014 season. After hitting .385/.456/.808 with nine home runs and 23 RBI in his first 21 games of the season, he was promoted to the Triple-A Scranton/Wilkes-Barre RailRiders. Overall, he batted .300 with a .941 OPS and 26 home runs. Roller spent 2015 with Scranton/Wilkes-Barre and hit .232 with 14 home runs. He was released by the Yankees after the season.

Roller signed a minor league deal with the Tampa Bay Rays in January 2016.

Roller signed with the Somerset Patriots on July 22, 2016.

Roller was released by the St. Paul Saints on May 17, 2017.

On May 26, 2017, Roller signed with the Somerset Patriots of the Atlantic League of Professional Baseball.

Roller was released after 2018 season.
