= Suzanne Lambin =

French microbiologist (1902–2008)

Suzanne Lambin (1902–2008) was a French microbiologist who studied the evolution of bacterial cultures and how various antiseptic agents affected those cultures. Lambin's work in microbiology led to a career in pharmacy and microbiology which won her recognition within France.

== Early life and education ==
Suzanne Lambin was born in Brittany in Nantes on August 1, 1902, to Valentine and René Lambin. The earliest stages of Lambin's education are largely undocumented but of what is known, she studied first at the University of Nantes. While at the University of Nantes, Lambin served as an assistant in physiology. Lambin moved to Paris in her early twenties and began studies in microbiology at the University of Paris. She began work as a pharmacist through the University of Paris and finally received her doctorate in microbiology around 1928.

== Career ==
After receiving her doctorate, Lambin continued to work as an assistant in microbiology, during this time receiving her tenure. Lambin maintained this position until she received her associate (agregé) thesis. Finishing her thesis enabled Lambin to begin teaching natural sciences in the university. Lambin was made a department head at the University of Paris once she began teaching and was then able to run her own laboratory. Starting in 1951, Lambin taught microbiology in the Paris Faculty of Pharmacy. Lambin maintained this position until the time of her retirement.

== Honors ==
In response to Lambin's research on the evolution of bacterial cultures and antiseptic agents led to recognition by the Order of Public Health. Lambin was elected to the Academy of Pharmacy and was a member of the French Association of Microbiologists and the Society of Biology (Société de Biologie). Lambin became a resident member of the Officer Academy in 1938, the Public Instruction in 1946, and the Academy of Pharmacy in 1951. Lambin became a member of the Knight of the Legion of Honour in 1954. A couple years later, Lambin became the Commander of the Ordre des Palmes Académiques in 1965 and an Officer of the National Order of Merit in 1969.
