= Xavier Batista =

Dominican Republic baseball player (born 1992)

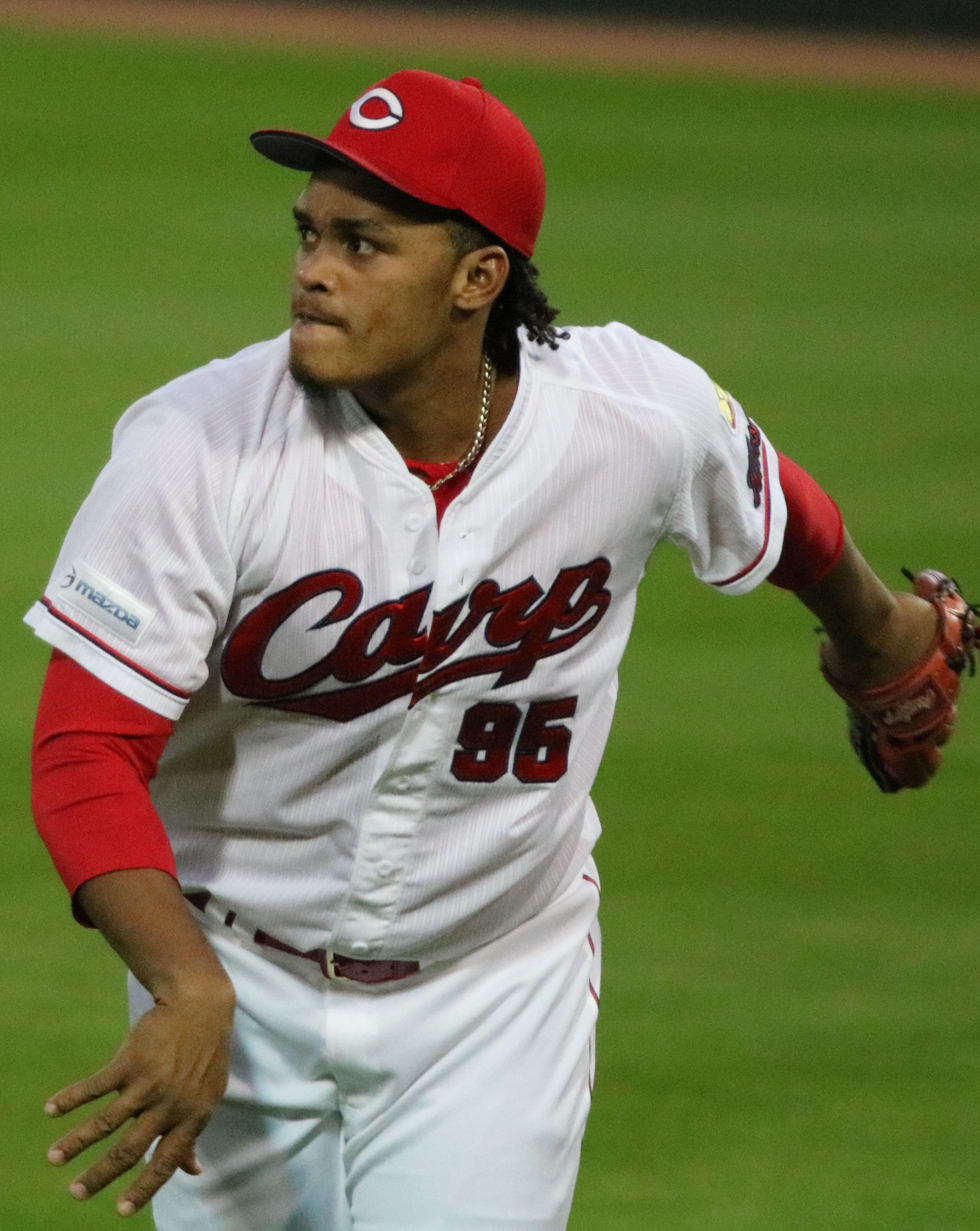
- Batista with the Hiroshima Toyo Carp

Free agent
- Outfielder
- Born: January 18, 1992 (age 34); San Pedro de Macorís, Dominican Republic
- Bats: Right Throws: Right

Professional debut
- NPB: June 3, 2017, for the Hiroshima Toyo Carp
- CPBL: April 3, 2022, for the Fubon Guardians

NPB statistics (through 2019 season)
- Batting average: .257
- Home runs: 62
- Runs batted in: 145

CPBL statistics (through 2022 season)
- Batting average: .157
- Home runs: 1
- Runs batted in: 9
- Stats at Baseball Reference

Teams
- Hiroshima Toyo Carp (2017–2019); Fubon Guardians (2022)

Xavier Alexander Batista (born January 18, 1992) is a Dominican professional baseball outfielder who is a free agent. He has previously played in Nippon Professional Baseball (NPB) for the Hiroshima Toyo Carp, and in the Chinese Professional Baseball League (CPBL) for the Fubon Guardians.

== Career ==
=== Chicago Cubs ===
On May 29, 2009, Batista signed his first professional contract with the Chicago Cubs organization when he was 17 year old. He made his professional debut with the DSL Cubs. In 2010, he played for the rookie ball AZL Cubs, batting .212/.263/.300 in 45 games. He played 2011 with the DSL Cubs, accumulating a .259/.371/.472 batting line with 10 home runs and 38 RBI. In 2012, Batista played for the Low-A Boise Hawks, slashing .198/.283/.335 with 4 home runs and 17 RBI in 51 games. Batista began 2013 with the AZL Cubs, but after batting .246/.373/.420 with 1 home run in 21 games, he was released on July 31, 2013.

=== Hiroshima Toyo Carp ===
Batista was out of baseball until the Hiroshima Toyo Carp signed him as a developmental player in March 2016, and he spent the season with their developmental squad. The Carp signed him to their top roster in June 2017, to a six-year contract worth $47,000 per year with a $100,000 signing bonus. He hit home runs in his first two at bats for the Carp, becoming the first foreign-born player to hit two home runs in his first NPB at bats. He finished the season batting .256/.336/.560 with 11 home runs and 26 RBI. In 2018, Batista slashed .242/.308/.546 with 25 home runs and 55 RBI in 99 games.

Batista played in 103 games for Hiroshima in 2019, batting .269/.350/.513 with 26 home runs and 64 RBI. The Carp deactivated Batista on August 17, 2019, after he tested positive for a banned substance. On March 2, 2020, it was announced that Batista's contract had been terminated by the Carp, and he became a free agent.

=== Sultanes de Monterrey ===
On May 5, 2021, Batista signed with the Sultanes de Monterrey of the Mexican League. In 13 games for the club, Batista batted .327/.339/.455 with 9 RBIs.

=== Bravos de León ===
On June 5, 2021, Batista was traded to the Bravos de León in exchange for OF Anthony Giansanti. In 53 games he hit .288/.362/.605 with 19 home runs and 48 RBIs.

=== Fubon Guardians ===
On January 3, 2022, Batista signed with the Fubon Guardians of the Chinese Professional Baseball League. On April 25, Batista was demoted to the farm team after hitting .222/.286/.361 with a 33% strikeout percentage and 80 wRC+ in 42 plate appearances. He was released on July 2, 2022. He finished his tenure with the Guardians playing in 18 games and hitting .157/.250/.255 with one home run and 9 RBI.

=== Bravos de León (second stint) ===
On February 16, 2023, Batista signed with the Bravos de León of the Mexican League. In 19 games, he slashed .247/.333/.468 with 4 home runs and 17 RBIs. Batista was released on May 13.

=== Mariachis de Guadalajara ===
On May 16, 2023, Batista signed with the Mariachis de Guadalajara. In 14 games, he batted .271/.364/.521 with 3 home runs and 4 RBIs. Batista was released on June 1.

=== Piratas de Campeche ===
On June 9, 2023, Batista signed with the Piratas de Campeche. In 46 games for Campeche, he hit .244/.324/.563 with 16 home runs and 40 RBI. Batista was released by the team on January 22, 2024.

=== Kamikawa Shibetsu Samurai Blades ===
Batista signed with the Kamikawa Shibetsu Samurai Blades of the Hokkaido Frontier League for the 2025 season.

=== Tecolotes de los Dos Laredos ===
On June 16, 2026, Batista signed with the Tecolotes de los Dos Laredos of the Mexican League. In nine appearances for the Tecolotes, he went 3-for-24 at the plate (.125) with no home runs and one RBI. On June 26, Batista was released by Dos Laredos.
