= Chase Lambin =

American baseball player (born 1979)

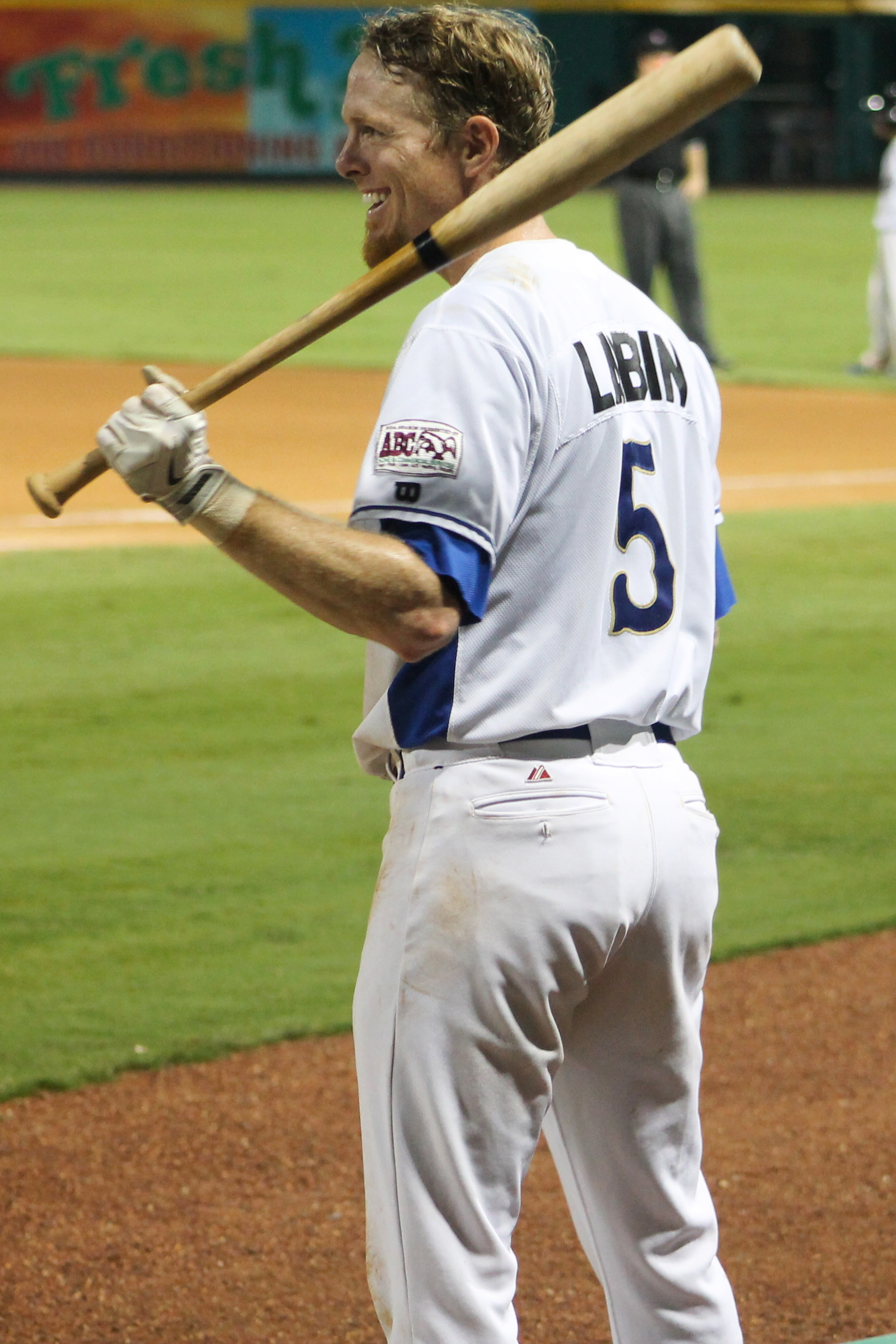
- Lambin with the Sugar Land Skeeters
- Infielder / Hitting coach
- Born: July 7, 1979 (age 46); Houston, Texas, U.S.
- Batted: Switch Threw: Right

NPB debut
- April 7, 2009, for the Chiba Lotte Marines

Last NPB appearance
- August 6, 2009, for the Chiba Lotte Marines

NPB statistics
- Batting average: .192
- Home runs: 4
- Runs batted in: 12
- Stats at Baseball Reference

Teams
- Chiba Lotte Marines (2009)

Chase Morrow Lambin (born July 7, 1979) is an American former professional baseball infielder and current coach for the Nashville Sounds in the Texas Rangers organization. Lambin retired as a player in 2014, after playing in several Minor League organizations, as well as for the independent Sugar Land Skeeters. He played in Nippon Professional Baseball (NPB) for the Chiba Lotte Marines in 2009.

== Playing career ==
=== High school and college ===
Lambin attended Cypress Falls High School. As a third baseman, Lambin was named to the Baseball Factory Pre-Season First Team. Playing baseball for Grayson County College, Lambin was named to the JUCO World Series All-Tournament Team in 1999 and 2000. He spent one season at University of Texas at Austin, hitting for a .214 batting average in 28 at-bats.

Lambin transferred to the University of Louisiana at Lafayette, where he played as a senior (Note: A 2013 feature in The Washington Post describes Lambin as having played for University of Louisiana at Lafayette for four seasons, but multiple sources indicate that he only played his senior year there.) for the Louisiana–Lafayette Ragin' Cajuns baseball team. He was selected by the New York Mets in the 34th round (1017th overall selection) of the 2002 Major League Baseball draft.

=== Early minor league career ===
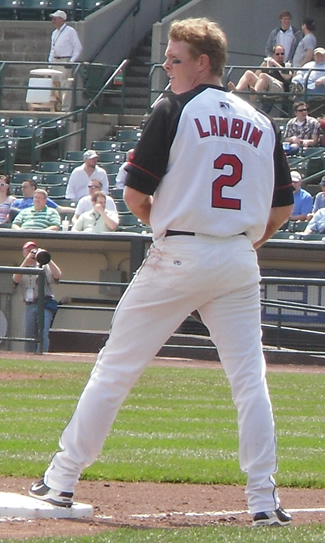
Lambin with Rochester

Lambin played in the Mets' minor league organization from 2002 through 2006. In 2005, he had a .309 batting average and 24 home runs between the Binghamton Mets of the Class AA Eastern League and the Norfolk Tides of the Class AAA International League. In 2006, his batting average regressed to .222. He was demoted from Norfolk to Binghamton, and released during spring training in 2007.

In 2007, Lambin played for the Class AA Carolina Mudcats. In 116 games, he hit .283 with 15 home runs and 53 RBI. The next year, Lambin was promoted to the Class AAA Albuquerque Isotopes, where he hit .300 with 14 home runs and 54 RBI.

=== Japan ===
In 2009, Lambin played for the Chiba Lotte Marines in Japan's Pacific League under manager Bobby Valentine. Sportswriter Mike Waters wrote that the season in Japan "combined the worst season of baseball in Lambin’s career with perhaps the best year in his life." He hit .192 with 4 home runs and 12 runs batted in (RBI) in 58 games.

Lambin blogged about his experiences in Japan and later commented, "Even the writing doesn’t capture how amazing it was. I'd write about it and I'd tell my parents and family and friends and even my parents didn't really grasp it until they came over and saw it for themselves. It was a magic carpet ride the whole time."

=== Return to the minor leagues ===
Lambin returned to the United States in 2010, where he played for the Washington Nationals organization. He was named the "Top Star" for the International League in the 2010 Triple-A All-Star Game. He hit .252 with 15 home runs and 58 RBI that year. The next year, playing for the Rochester Red Wings (the Class AAA affiliate of the Minnesota Twins), he hit .274 with 6 home runs and 46 RBI.

On February 15, 2012, Lambin signed a minor league contract with the Marlins. He appeared in 89 games for the Class AAA New Orleans Zephyrs and hit for a .253 batting average with 8 home runs and 32 RBI. He also pitched one scoreless inning that season. After being released by the Marlins, he signed with the independent Sugar Land Skeeters. On May 30, 2013, he signed a minor league contract with the Kansas City Royals. As of July 2013, Lambin played for the Class AAA Omaha Storm Chasers and was the oldest active minor leaguer to never have played in MLB.

Lambin returned to the Skeeters in April 2014.

== Coaching career ==
Lambin joined the Texas Rangers organization as a coach in 2015. He spent 2015 with the Spokane Indians of the Low-A Northwest League. He spent 2016 with the Arizona Rangers of the Rookie-level Arizona League. He returned to the Spokane Indians for 2017. In 2018 he spent the season with the Hickory Crawdads of the Single-A South Atlantic League. In 2019, he was assigned to the Down East Wood Ducks of the High-A Carolina League as their hitting coach. He was promoted to hitting coach of the Nashville Sounds of the Triple-A Pacific Coast League in 2020. Lambin spent the 2022 season as the bench coach for the Round Rock Express.

== Personal life ==
Lambin met his wife, Sara, a Binghamton University graduate, in Binghamton, New York, They have a son and a daughter.
