= Greg Hansell =

American baseball player (born 1971)

- Pitcher
- Born: March 12, 1971 (age 54); Bellflower, California, U.S.
- Batted: Right Threw: Right

Professional debut
- MLB: April 28, 1995, for the Los Angeles Dodgers
- NPB: April 2, 2000, for the Hanshin Tigers

Last appearance
- MLB: October 3, 1999, for the Pittsburgh Pirates
- NPB: September 14, 2002, for the Hanshin Tigers

MLB statistics
- Win–loss record: 4–4
- Earned run average: 5.56
- Strikeouts: 98
- Stats at Baseball Reference

Teams
- Los Angeles Dodgers (1995); Minnesota Twins (1996); Milwaukee Brewers (1997); Pittsburgh Pirates (1999); Hanshin Tigers (2000–2002)

Gregory Michael Hansell (born March 12, 1971) is an American former baseball pitcher.

== Career ==
Hansell played for four different major league ballclubs during his career: the Los Angeles Dodgers (1995), Minnesota Twins (1996), Milwaukee Brewers (1997), and Pittsburgh Pirates (1999). He made his major league debut on April 28, 1995, and played his final game on October 3, 1999.

On December 7, 1999, Hansell was purchased from the Pittsburgh Pirates by the Hanshin Tigers of the Japan Central League. Hansell would attempt a return to Major League Baseball in 2003, but failed to make the big league roster in tryouts with the New York Yankees and Arizona Diamondbacks.
