= José Parra (baseball) =

Dominican baseball player (born 1972)

- Pitcher
- Born: November 28, 1972 (age 53); Jacagua, Dominican Republic
- Batted: Right Threw: Right

Professional debut
- MLB: August 2, 1995, for the Los Angeles Dodgers
- KBO: April 13, 1998, for the Samsung Lions
- NPB: May 8, 1999, for the Yomiuri Giants
- CPBL: August 19, 2001, for the Uni-President Lions

Last appearance
- KBO: 2002, for the Hanwha Eagles
- CPBL: October 3, 2003, for the Uni-President Lions
- MLB: July 17, 2004, for the New York Mets
- NPB: June 11, 2005, for the Orix Buffaloes

MLB statistics
- Win–loss record: 7–12
- Earned run average: 6.09
- Strikeouts: 117

KBO statistics
- Win–loss record: 10–9
- Earned run average: 4.34
- Strikeouts: 87

NPB statistics
- Win–loss record: 6–5
- Earned run average: 4.82
- Strikeouts: 45

CPBL statistics
- Win–loss record: 5–3
- Earned run average: 1.47
- Strikeouts: 64
- Stats at Baseball Reference

Teams
- Los Angeles Dodgers (1995); Minnesota Twins (1995–1996); Samsung Lions (1998); Yomiuri Giants (1999); Pittsburgh Pirates (2000); Uni-President Lions (2001); Arizona Diamondbacks (2002); Hanwha Eagles (2002); Uni-President Lions (2003); New York Mets (2004); Orix Buffaloes (2005)

José Miguel Parra (born November 28, 1972) is a Dominican former Major League Baseball right-handed pitcher who played from 1995-2004. He also played two seasons in Japan, for the Yomiuri Giants in 1999 and the Orix Buffaloes in 2005, as well as in South Korea and Taiwan. He most recently served as the pitching coach for the Gulf Coast League Tigers.

== Playing career ==
As of the end of the 2025 season, Parra is the only player in Major League Baseball history to have 4 or more career plate appearances as a batter, but have no official at bats. In Parra's 4 career plate appearances, he recorded 2 sacrifice hits (both in 1 game in 1995, Dodgers vs. Rockies), and 2 walks (both in 1 game in 2000, Pirates vs. Braves).

== Coaching career ==
On December 13, 2018, Parra was named pitching coach for the Gulf Coast League Tigers. He previously served as the pitching coach for the Dominican Summer League Tigers for 11 seasons. On September 15, 2019, Parra was fired by the Tigers.
