= 1987 Milwaukee Brewers season =

1987 Milwaukee Brewers
- League: American League
- Division: East
- Ballpark: Milwaukee County Stadium
- City: Milwaukee, Wisconsin, United States
- Record: 91–71 (.562)
- Divisional place: 3rd
- Owners: Bud Selig
- General managers: Harry Dalton
- Managers: Tom Trebelhorn
- Television: WVTV (Jim Paschke, Mike Hegan)
- Radio: WTMJ (AM) (Bob Uecker, Pat Hughes)

The 1987 Milwaukee Brewers season was the 18th season for the Brewers in Milwaukee, and their 19th as an MLB franchise. The Brewers finished in third place in the American League East, with a record of 91 wins and 71 losses. The team began the season at a red-hot pace, winning their first 13 games under first-year manager Tom Trebelhorn before losing 12 games in a row in May. Other highlights included Paul Molitor's 39-game hitting streak, the seventh-longest streak in MLB history and second-longest streak post-World War Two (as of 2024), and Juan Nieves tossing the first no-hitter in Brewers history on April 15 with a 7–0 blanking of the Baltimore Orioles.

== Offseason ==
- December 10, 1986: Tim Leary and Tim Crews were traded by the Brewers to the Los Angeles Dodgers for Greg Brock.

== Regular season ==
=== Season standings ===
AL East
Team	W	L	Pct.	GB	Home	Road
Detroit Tigers	98	64	.605	—	54‍–‍27	44‍–‍37
Toronto Blue Jays	96	66	.593	2	52‍–‍29	44‍–‍37
Milwaukee Brewers	91	71	.562	7	48‍–‍33	43‍–‍38
New York Yankees	89	73	.549	9	51‍–‍30	38‍–‍43
Boston Red Sox	78	84	.481	20	50‍–‍30	28‍–‍54
Baltimore Orioles	67	95	.414	31	31‍–‍51	36‍–‍44
Cleveland Indians	61	101	.377	37	35‍–‍46	26‍–‍55

=== Record vs. opponents ===
1987 American League record Sources:
Team	BAL	BOS	CAL	CWS	CLE	DET	KC	MIL	MIN	NYY	OAK	SEA	TEX	TOR
Baltimore	—	1–12	9–3	8–4	7–6	4–9	9–3	2–11	5–7	3–10	7–5	4–8	7–5	1–12
Boston	12–1	—	4–8	3–9	7–6	2–11	6–6	6–7	7–5	7–6	4–8	7–5	7–5	6–7
California	3–9	8–4	—	8–5	7–5	3–9	5–8	7–5	8–5	3–9	6–7	7–6	5–8	5–7
Chicago	4–8	9–3	5–8	—	7–5	3–9	6–7	6–6	6–7	5–7	9–4	6–7	7–6	4–8
Cleveland	6–7	6–7	5–7	5–7	—	4–9	6–6	4–9	3–9	6–7	4–8	5–7	2–10	5–8
Detroit	9–4	11–2	9–3	9–3	9–4	—	5–7	6–7	8–4	5–8	5–7	7–5	8–4	7–6
Kansas City	3–9	6–6	8–5	7–6	6–6	7–5	—	4–8	8–5	5–7	5–8	9–4	7–6	8–4
Milwaukee	11–2	7–6	5–7	6–6	9–4	7–6	8–4	—	3–9	7–6	6–6	4–8	9–3	9–4
Minnesota	7–5	5–7	5–8	7–6	9–3	4–8	5–8	9–3	—	6–6	10–3	9–4	6–7	3–9
New York	10–3	6–7	9–3	7–5	7–6	8–5	7–5	6–7	6–6	—	5–7	7–5	5–7	6–7
Oakland	5–7	8–4	7–6	4–9	8–4	7–5	8–5	6–6	3–10	7–5	—	5–8	6–7	7–5
Seattle	8–4	5–7	6–7	7–6	7–5	5–7	4–9	8–4	4–9	5–7	8–5	—	9–4	2–10
Texas	5–7	5–7	8–5	6–7	10–2	4–8	6–7	3–9	7–6	7–5	7–6	4–9	—	3–9
Toronto	12–1	7–6	7–5	8–4	8–5	6–7	4–8	4–9	9–3	7–6	5–7	10–2	9–3	—

=== Notable transactions ===
- June 2, 1987: 1987 Major League Baseball draft
  - Brian Turang was drafted by the Brewers in the 20th round, but did not sign.
  - Mark Kiefer was drafted by the Brewers in the 21st round.
- June 15, 1987: Jim Morris was released by the Brewers.
- June 29, 1987: Russ McGinnis was traded by the Brewers to the Oakland Athletics for Bill Mooneyham.
- July 16, 1987: Skeeter Barnes was purchased by the Brewers from the St. Louis Cardinals.
- July 30, 1987: Ray Burris was signed as a free agent by the Brewers.

=== Roster ===
1987 Milwaukee Brewers
**Roster**
**Pitchers**: 33 Jay Aldrich; 39 Len Barker; 40 Mike Birkbeck; 29 Chris Bosio; 48 Ray Burris; 34 Mark Ciardi; 25 Mark Clear; 32 Chuck Crim; 49 Teddy Higuera; 38 John Henry Johnson; 41 Mark Knudson; 31 Alex Madrid; 27 Paul Mirabella; 20 Juan Nieves; 37 Dan Plesac; 43 Dave Stapleton; 46 Bill Wegman	**Catchers**: 11 Charlie O'Brien; 21 Bill Schroeder; 5 B. J. Surhoff; **Infielders**: 9 Greg Brock; 3 Juan Castillo; 17 Jim Gantner; 30 Steve Kiefer; 4 Paul Molitor; 14 Jim Paciorek; 1 Ernest Riles; 13 Billy Jo Robidoux; 7 Dale Sveum	**Outfielders**: 26 Glenn Braggs; 45 Rob Deer; 16 Mike Felder; 36 Brad Komminsk; 28 Rick Manning; 19 Robin Yount; **Other batters**: 15 Cecil Cooper; 22 Steve Stanicek	**Manager**: 42 Tom Trebelhorn; **Coaches**: 8 Andy Etchebarren (Bench); 12 Larry Haney (Bullpen); 24 Chuck Hartenstein (Pitching); 10 Dave Hilton (First base); 35 Tony Muser (Third base/hitting)

=== Game log ===
Legend
	Brewers win
	Brewers loss
	Postponement
**Bold**	Brewers team member

1987 regular season game log: 91–71 (Home: 48–33; Away: 43–38)
April: 18–3 (Home: 9–0; Away: 9–3)

#	Date	Opponent	Score	Win	Loss	Save	Attendance	Record	Streak
1	April 6	Red Sox	5–1	**Higuera** (1–0)	Stanley (0–1)		52,585	1–0	W1
2	April 8	Red Sox	3–2	**Crim** (1–0)	Gardner (0–1)	**Plesac** (1)	7,412	2–0	W2
3	April 9	Red Sox	12–11	**Bosio** (1–0)	Crawford (0–1)	**Clear** (1)	9,628	3–0	W3
4	April 10	@ Rangers	11–8	**Nieves** (1–0)	Guzmán (0–1)		42,415	4–0	W4
5	April 11	@ Rangers	8–6	**Higuera** (2–0)	Hough (0–1)	**Plesac** (2)	23,037	5–0	W5
6	April 12	@ Rangers	7–5 (12)	**Clear** (1–0)	Anderson (0–1)	**Bosio** (1)	19,782	6–0	W6
7	April 13	@ Orioles	6–3	**Bosio** (2–0)	McGregor (0–1)		12,986	7–0	W7
8	April 14	@ Orioles	7–4	**Ciardi** (1–0)	Dixon (1–1)	**Plesac** (3)	14,049	8–0	W8
9	April 15	@ Orioles	7–0	**Nieves** (2–0)	Flanagan (0–1)		11,407	9–0	W9
10	April 17	Rangers	10–2	**Higuera** (3–0)	Mason (0–2)		41,548	10–0	W10
11	April 18	Rangers	4–3	**Wegman** (1–0)	Witt (0–1)	**Plesac** (4)	39,715	11–0	W11
12	April 19	Rangers	6–4	**Clear** (2–0)	Harris (0–2)		29,357	12–0	W12
13	April 20	@ White Sox	5–4	**Crim** (2–0)	DeLeón (2–1)	**Plesac** (5)	24,019	13–0	W13
14	April 21	@ White Sox	1–7	Davis (1–1)	**Ciardi** (1–1)	Winn (1)	17,023	13–1	L1
–	April 22	@ White Sox	Postponed (rain); Makeup: August 8						
15	April 24	Orioles	6–4	**Higuera** (4–0)	McGregor (0–3)		23,400	14–1	W1
16	April 25	Orioles	8–2	**Wegman** (2–0)	Dixon (1–2)		26,366	15–1	W2
17	April 26	Orioles	5–3	**Birkbeck** (1–0)	Flanagan (0–3)	**Plesac** (6)	38,523	16–1	W3
18	April 27	@ Angels	10–7 (12)	**Mirabella** (1–0)	Finley (0–2)		32,290	17–1	W4
19	April 28	@ Angels	5–10	Buice (1–0)	**Crim** (2–1)		31,358	17–2	L1
20	April 29	@ Athletics	8–7	**Bosio** (3–0)	G. Nelson (0–1)	**Plesac** (7)	11,879	18–2	W1
21	April 30	@ Athletics	1–4	Stewart (3–2)	**Wegman** (2–1)	Howell (3)	10,262	18–3	L1

May: 6–18 (Home: 2–10; Away: 10–5)

#	Date	Opponent	Score	Win	Loss	Save	Attendance	Record	Streak
22	May 1	@ Mariners	10–8	**Mirabella** (2–0)	Wilkinson (0–1)	**Plesac** (8)	13,689	19–3	W1
23	May 2	@ Mariners	6–4	**Clear** (3–0)	Langston (3–3)	**Plesac** (9)	23,701	20–3	W2
24	May 3	@ Mariners	3–7	Morgan (2–3)	**Higuera** (4–1)		12,632	20–4	L1
25	May 5	Angels	0–2	Sutton (2–3)	**Wegman** (2–2)	Moore (4)	13,137	20–5	L2
26	May 6	Angels	0–3	Witt (4–2)	**Birkbeck** (1–1)	Buice (1)	13,552	20–6	L3
27	May 8	Mariners	3–4 (12)	Clarke (2–0)	**Bosio** (3–1)	Wilkinson (1)	20,512	20–7	L4
28	May 9	Mariners	2–8	Morgan (3–3)	**Nieves** (2–1)		43,502	20–8	L5
29	May 10	Mariners	1–5	Moore (2–3)	**Wegman** (2–3)		25,496	20–9	L6
30	May 12	Athletics	8–10	Stewart (4–3)	**Mirabella** (2–1)	Howell (6)	9,459	20–10	L7
31	May 13	Athletics	2–8	Young (5–1)	**Higuera** (4–2)		12,997	20–11	L8
32	May 15	@ Royals	3–4	Quisenberry (2–0)	**Clear** (3–1)		38,532	20–12	L9
33	May 16	@ Royals	0–13	Leibrandt (5–2)	**Wegman** (2–4)		40,092	20–13	L10
34	May 17	@ Royals	2–3	Farr (2–1)	**Birkbeck** (1–2)	Gleaton (3)	35,724	20–14	L11
35	May 19	White Sox	1–5	DeLeón (4–3)	**Higuera** (4–3)	James (3)	11,903	20–15	L12
36	May 20	White Sox	5–1	**Nieves** (3–1)	Davis (1–3)		14,371	21–15	W1
37	May 22	Indians	4–2	**Wegman** (3–4)	Niekro (2–4)	**Plesac** (10)	15,017	22–15	W2
38	May 23	Indians	2–6	Carlton (3–4)	**Birkbeck** (1–3)		27,234	22–16	L1
39	May 24	Indians	3–5	Schrom (4–4)	**Higuera** (4–4)	Bailes (2)	36,338	22–17	L2
40	May 26	@ Twins	2–4	Blyleven (4–4)	**Nieves** (3–2)	Reardon (10)	23,276	22–18	L3
41	May 27	@ Twins	2–7	Viola (3–5)	**Wegman** (3–5)	Frazier (1)	22,947	22–19	L4
42	May 28	@ Twins	1–13	Berenguer (3–0)	**Birkbeck** (1–4)		26,203	22–20	L5
43	May 29	@ Indians	6–9	Bailes (2–0)	**Higuera** (4–5)		47,442	22–21	L6
44	May 30	@ Indians	6–5 (10)	**Clear** (4–1)	Huismann (0–3)	**Plesac** (11)	13,619	23–21	W1
45	May 31	@ Indians	7–1	**Nieves** (4–2)	Swindell (3–5)		12,831	24–21	W2

June: 13–15 (Home: 8–7; Away: 5–8)

#	Date	Opponent	Score	Win	Loss	Save	Attendance	Record	Streak
46	June 1	Royals	3–2	**Wegman** (4–5)	Leibrandt (6–4)	**Plesac** (12)	9,670	25–21	W3
47	June 2	Royals	14–3	**Crim** (3–1)	Black (2–2)	**Clear** (2)	12,240	26–21	W4
48	June 3	Royals	4–2	**Barker** (1–0)	Gubicza (3–6)	**Plesac** (13)	17,740	27–21	W5
49	June 4	Yankees	9–3	**Higuera** (5–5)	Niekro (3–4)		23,093	28–21	W6
50	June 5	Yankees	1–13	John (6–1)	**Nieves** (4–3)		36,951	28–22	L1
51	June 6	Yankees	7–6	**Plesac** (1–0)	Righetti (4–2)		52,366	29–22	W1
52	June 7	Yankees	3–5	Bordi (2–0)	**Crim** (3–2)	Clements (1)	52,770	29–23	L1
53	June 9	@ Tigers	5–8	Morris (8–2)	**Higuera** (5–6)		16,645	29–24	L2
54	June 10	@ Tigers	8–5 (10)	**Plesac** (2–0)	King (3–5)		16,998	30–24	W1
55	June 11	@ Tigers	8–5	**Wegman** (5–5)	King (3–6)	**Bosio** (2)	20,780	31–24	W2
56	June 12	@ Yankees	3–8	Rasmussen (4–4)	**Crim** (3–3)		31,789	31–25	L1
57	June 13	@ Yankees	1–4	Rhoden (7–4)	**Nieves** (4–4)	Righetti (13)	30,231	31–26	L2
58	June 14	@ Yankees	6–4	**Plesac** (3–0)	Righetti (4–3)		50,351	32–26	W1
59	June 15	Twins	0–5	Blyleven (5–5)	**Wegman** (5–6)		18,403	32–27	L1
60	June 16	Twins	3–7	Viola (6–5)	**Crim** (3–4)	Reardon (13)	21,613	32–28	L2
61	June 17	Twins	8–5	**Clear** (5–1)	Straker (2–4)	**Plesac** (14)	23,389	33–28	W1
62	June 18	@ Blue Jays	6–3	**Nieves** (5–4)	Stieb (5–4)	**Plesac** (15)	31,353	34–28	W2
63	June 19	@ Blue Jays	6–15	Musselman (5–1)	**Clear** (5–2)		31,230	34–29	L1
64	June 20	@ Blue Jays	3–2	**Wegman** (6–6)	Key (8–5)	**Plesac** (16)	38,465	35–29	W1
65	June 21	@ Blue Jays	6–7	Musselman (6–1)	**Crim** (3–5)	Henke (12)	44,444	35–30	L1
66	June 22	@ Red Sox	2–5 (8)	Boyd (1–0)	**Johnson** (0–1)		29,546	35–31	L2
67	June 23	@ Red Sox	5–9	Crawford (3–2)	**Wegman** (6–7)	Schiraldi (3)	31,104	35–32	L3
68	June 24	@ Red Sox	7–8	Hurst (8–5)	**Higuera** (5–7)	Schiraldi (4)	34,376	35–33	L4
69	June 26	Blue Jays	10–5	**Plesac** (4–0)	Henke (0–2)		29,461	36–33	W1
70	June 27	Blue Jays	1–8	Clancy (8–5)	**Nieves** (5–5)		48,159	36–34	L1
71	June 28	Blue Jays	11–5	**Higuera** (6–7)	Stieb (6–5)		42,389	37–34	W1
72	June 29	Tigers	1–11	Morris (11–3)	**Bosio** (3–2)		21,487	37–35	L1
73	June 30	Tigers	5–8	Petry (5–4)	**Clear** (5–3)	Hernández (4)	21,609	37–36	L2

July: 15–13 (Home: 9–5; Away: 6–8)

#	Date	Opponent	Score	Win	Loss	Save	Attendance	Record	Streak
74	July 1	Tigers	13–2	**Wegman** (7–7)	Terrell (6–8)		24,528	38–36	W1
75	July 2	@ Angels	7–9 (13)	Finley (1–3)	**Clear** (5–4)		28,116	38–37	L1
76	July 3	@ Angels	6–4	**Higuera** (7–7)	Fraser (5–6)		32,759	39–37	W1
77	July 4	@ Angels	2–1	**Bosio** (4–2)	Sutton (5–9)	**Plesac** (17)	62,531	40–37	W2
78	July 5	@ Angels	3–4 (12)	Finley (2–3)	**Clear** (5–5)		27,525	40–38	L1
79	July 6	@ Mariners	2–3	Morgan (7–9)	**Wegman** (7–8)	Núñez (10)	15,922	40–39	L2
80	July 7	@ Mariners	5–9	Guetterman (7–1)	**Nieves** (5–6)	Reed (2)	9,041	40–40	L3
81	July 8	@ Mariners	2–5 (11)	Wilkinson (2–2)	**Plesac** (4–1)		8,482	40–41	L4
82	July 9	@ Athletics	8–3	**Bosio** (5–2)	Rijo (1–5)		15,072	41–41	W1
83	July 10	@ Athletics	3–7	Stewart (11–7)	**Knudson** (0–1)	Eckersley (6)	14,733	41–42	L1
84	July 11	@ Athletics	5–6	Eckersley (6–4)	**Plesac** (4–2)		28,399	42–42	L2
85	July 12	@ Athletics	4–3	**Nieves** (6–6)	Howell (2–3)	**Plesac** (18)	33,519	42–43	W1
ASG	July 14	NL @ AL	2–0	Smith (1–0)	Howell (0–1)	Fernandez (1)	49,671	–	–
86	July 16	Angels	6–4	**Higuera** (8–7)	McCaskill (2–1)	**Plesac** (19)	24,325	43–43	W2
87	July 17	Angels	12–2	**Wegman** (8–8)	Witt (11–6)		19,858	44–43	W3
88	July 18	Angels	6–12	Buice (4–3)	**Plesac** (4–3)		35,038	44–44	L1
89	July 19	Angels	5–8	Lazorko (3–5)	**Aldrich** (0–1)	Minton (7)	30,635	44–45	L2
90	July 20	Mariners	13–11	**Crim** (4–5)	Morgan (7–11)	**Clear** (3)	10,577	45–45	W1
91	July 21	Mariners	6–4	**Higuera** (9–7)	Moore (3–12)		13,373	46–45	W2
92	July 22	Mariners	1–2	Langston (11–9)	**Wegman** (8–9)		19,221	46–46	L1
93	July 23	Athletics	12–5	**Bosio** (6–2)	Andújar (3–3)		14,475	47–46	W1
94	July 24	Athletics	10–2	**Nieves** (7–6)	Ontiveros (5–4)		20,828	48–46	W2
95	July 25	Athletics	4–13	Young (10–5)	**Knudson** (0–2)		34,344	48–47	L1
96	July 26	Athletics	7–4	**Higuera** (10–7)	Lamp (1–1)	**Plesac** (20)	25,764	49–47	W1
97	July 27	@ Rangers	4–5	Williams (6–3)	**Plesac** (4–4)		16,621	49–48	L1
98	July 28	@ Rangers	9–2	**Bosio** (7–2)	Guzmán (8–10)	**Clear** (4)	17,899	50–48	W1
99	July 29	@ Rangers	9–8 (12)	**Plesac** (5–4)	Kilgus (1–2)		17,157	51–48	W2
100	July 30	White Sox	6–1	**Knudson** (1–2)	Allen (0–5)	**Crim** (1)	16,547	52–48	W3
101	July 31	White Sox	6–8	Dotson (8–7)	**Higuera** (10–8)	Thigpen (2)	24,722	52–49	L1

August: 18–11 (Home: 10–7; Away: 8–4)

#	Date	Opponent	Score	Win	Loss	Save	Attendance	Record	Streak
102	August 1	White Sox	2–3	LaPoint (1–0)	**Wegman** (8–10)	Searage (2)	43.335	52–50	L2
103	August 2	White Sox	3–7	Long (6–6)	**Bosio** (7–3)	Thigpen (3)	30,582	52–51	L3
104	August 4	Orioles	9–8 (12)	**Knudson** (2–2)	Williamson (5–8)		19,296	53–51	W1
105	August 5	Orioles	5–1	**Higuera** (11–8)	Bell (9–8)		14,281	54–51	W2
106	August 6	Orioles	11–8	**Aldrich** (1–1)	Griffin (2–4)	**Crim** (2)	24,353	55–51	W3
107	August 7	@ White Sox	7–4 (10)	**Clear** (6–5)	Thigpen (3–3)	**Plesac** (21)	22,658	56–51	W4
108	August 8	@ White Sox	5–3	**Burris** (1–0)	DeLeón (5–10)	**Crim** (3)	–	57–51	W5
109	August 8	@ White Sox	6–8	Bannister (7–9)	**Bosio** (7–4)	Thigpen (4)	18,993	57–52	L1
110	August 9	@ White Sox	8–4	**Nieves** (8–6)	Allen (0–7)		15,498	58–52	W1
111	August 10	Rangers	4–3 (12)	**Aldrich** (2–1)	Russell (4–2)		21,257	59–52	W2
112	August 11	Rangers	1–7	Harris (5–8)	**Knudson** (2–3)		17,502	59–53	L1
113	August 12	Rangers	3–12	Kilgus (2–4)	**Burris** (1–1)		21,609	59–54	L2
114	August 13	@ Orioles	4–5	Boddicker (8–6)	**Bosio** (7–5)	Niedenfuer (8)	24,910	59–55	L3
115	August 14	@ Orioles	6–2	**Nieves** (9–6)	Bell (9–9)	**Crim** (4)	19,761	60–55	W1
116	August 15	@ Orioles	1–2	Flanagan (2–5)	**Higuera** (11–9)		29,243	60–56	L1
117	August 16	@ Orioles	6–2	**Crim** (5–5)	Schmidt (10–4)	**Plesac** (22)	25,950	61–56	W1
118	August 17	@ Indians	5–3	**Knudson** (3–3)	Bailes (6–5)		7,011	62–56	W2
119	August 18	@ Indians	8–9 (12)	Farrell (1–0)	**Burris** (1–2)		10,205	62–57	L1
120	August 19	@ Indians	13–2	**Nieves** (10–6)	Candiotti (6–12)		8,288	63–57	W1
121	August 20	@ Indians	14–2	**Higuera** (12–9)	Schrom (5–10)		7,855	64–57	W2
122	August 21	Royals	3–0	**Barker** (3–0)	D. Jackson (6–15)	**Crim** (5)	37,141	65–57	W3
123	August 22	Royals	7–8	Gleaton (3–4)	**Knudson** (3–4)		37,740	65–58	L1
124	August 23	Royals	10–5	**Aldrich** (3–1)	Stoddard (1–2)		33,887	66–58	W1
125	August 25	Indians	10–9	**Nieves** (11–6)	Schrom (5–11)	**Crim** (6)	15,580	67–58	W2
126	August 26	Indians	1–0 (10)	**Higuera** (13–9)	Jones (3–4)		11,246	68–58	W3
127	August 27	Indians	4–3	**Knudson** (4–4)	Akerfelds (1–4)	**Crim** (7)	15,175	69–58	W4
128	August 28	Twins	1–0	**Bosio** (8–5)	Straker (6–9)		22,461	70–58	W5
129	August 29	Twins	3–12	Blyleven (13–10)	**Barker** (2–1)		34,834	70–59	L1
130	August 30	Twins	6–10	Atherton (5–4)	**Crim** (5–6)	Reardon (25)	22,417	70–60	L2

September: 20–9 (Home: 10–4; Away: 4–8)

#	Date	Opponent	Score	Win	Loss	Save	Attendance	Record	Streak
131	September 1	@ Royals	2–0	**Higuera** (14–9)	Saberhagen (16–8)		19,067	71–60	W1
132	September 2	@ Royals	3–2	**Wegman** (9–10)	Leibrandt (13–10)	**Plesac** (23)	19,430	72–60	W2
133	September 3	@ Royals	8–2	**Bosio** (9–5)	Gubicza (9–16)	**Crim** (8)	23,122	73–60	W3
134	September 4	@ Twins	1–2 (12)	Berenguer (6–0)	**Plesac** (5–5)		27,380	73–61	L1
135	September 5	@ Twins	1–2	Atherton (7–4)	**Crim** (5–7)		51,122	73–62	L2
136	September 6	@ Twins	6–0	**Higuera** (15–9)	Carlton (6–14)		36,586	74–62	W1
137	September 7	Blue Jays	3–5	Ward (1–0)	**Plesac** (5–6)	Henke (32)	16,935	74–63	L1
138	September 8	Blue Jays	6–4	**Bosio** (10–5)	Stieb (13–8)	**Crim** (9)	8,053	75–63	W1
139	September 9	Blue Jays	6–4	**Clear** (7–5)	Wells (1–3)		10,555	76–63	W2
140	September 10	Tigers	4–3	**Nieves** (12–6)	Tanana (13–10)	**Mirabella** (1)	9,715	77–63	W3
141	September 11	Tigers	5–2	**Higuera** (16–9)	Henneman (9–2)		21,161	78–63	W4
142	September 12	Tigers	11–2	**Wegman** (10–10)	Morris (17–8)		50,288	79–63	W5
143	September 13	Tigers	1–5	Terrell (14–10)	**Bosio** (10–6)		21,880	79–64	L1
144	September 14	@ Yankees	6–4	**Stapleton** (1–0)	Gullickson (2–2)	**Clear** (5)	20,211	80–64	W1
145	September 15	@ Yankees	3–4	Leiter (1–0)	**Nieves** (12–7)	Righetti (28)	22,102	80–65	L1
146	September 16	@ Yankees	5–4	**Higuera** (17–9)	Stoddard (4–3)		20,232	81–65	W1
147	September 18	@ Tigers	6–7	Terrell (15–10)	**Wegman** (10–11)	King (9)	30,104	81–66	L1
148	September 19	@ Tigers	2–5	Alexander (7–0)	**Bosio** (10–7)		34,006	81–67	L2
149	September 20	@ Tigers	11–4	**Nieves** (13–7)	Morris (18–9)	**Crim** (10)	42,143	82–67	W1
–	September 21	Yankees	Postponed (wet grounds); Makeup: September 22						
150	September 22	Yankees	7–2	**Higuera** (18–9)	John (12–6)	**Mirabella** (2)	–	83–67	W2
151	September 22	Yankees	8–10	Clements (3–2)	**Crim** (5–8)	Righetti (30)	12,651	83–68	L1
152	September 23	Yankees	8–7 (10)	**Crim** (6–8)	Righetti (8–5)		11,219	84–68	W1
153	September 24	Red Sox	7–6	**Clear** (8–5)	Sambito (2–5)		7,745	85–68	W2
154	September 25	Red Sox	2–9	Clemens (18–9)	**Nieves** (13–8)		12,878	85–69	L1
155	September 26	Red Sox	3–2	**Stapleton** (2–0)	Nipper (10–12)		19,206	86–69	W1
156	September 27	Red Sox	9–6	**Burris** (2–2)	Stanley (4–15)	**Crim** (11)	26,175	87–69	W2
157	September 28	@ Blue Jays	6–4	**Wegman** (11–11)	Flanagan (6–8)	**Clear** (6)	34,113	88–69	W3
158	September 29	@ Blue Jays	5–3	**Bosio** (11–7)	Key (17–7)		34,314	89–69	W4
159	September 30	@ Blue Jays	5–2	**Nieves** (14–8)	Stieb (13–9)		35,245	90–69	W5

October: 1–2 (Home: 0–0; Away: 1–2)

#	Date	Opponent	Score	Win	Loss	Save	Attendance	Record	Streak
160	October 2	@ Red Sox	2–3 (12)	Gardner (3–6)	**Higuera** (18–10)		20,077	90–70	L1
161	October 3	@ Red Sox	8–4	**Wegman** (12–11)	Leister (0–2)	**Crim** (12)	21,962	91–70	W1
162	October 4	@ Red Sox	0–4	Clemens (20–9)	**Bosio** (11–8)		25,454	91–71	L1

== Player stats ==
=== Batting ===
==== Starters by position ====
Note: Pos = Position; G = Games played; AB = At bats; H = Hits; Avg. = Batting average; HR = Home runs; RBI = Runs batted in

Pos	Player	G	AB	H	Avg.	HR	RBI
C	B. J. Surhoff	115	395	118	.299	7	68
1B	Greg Brock	141	532	159	.299	13	85
2B	Juan Castillo	116	321	72	.224	3	28
3B	Ernest Riles	83	276	72	.261	4	38
SS	Dale Sveum	153	535	135	.252	25	95
LF	Rob Deer	134	474	113	.238	28	80
CF	Robin Yount	158	635	218	.312	21	103
RF	Glenn Braggs	132	505	136	.269	13	77
DH	Cecil Cooper	63	250	62	.248	6	36

==== Other batters ====
Note: G = Games played; AB = At bats; H = Hits; Avg. = Batting average; HR = Home runs; RBI = Runs batted in

Player	G	AB	H	Avg.	HR	RBI
Paul Molitor	118	465	164	.353	16	75
Mike Felder	108	289	77	.266	2	31
Jim Gantner	81	265	72	.272	4	30
Bill Schroeder	75	250	83	.332	14	42
Rick Manning	97	114	26	.228	0	13
Jim Paciorek	48	101	23	.228	2	10
Steve Kiefer	28	99	20	.202	5	17
Billy Jo Robidoux	23	62	12	.194	0	4
Charlie O'Brien	10	35	7	.200	0	0
Brad Komminsk	7	15	1	.067	0	0
Steve Stanicek	4	7	2	.286	0	0

=== Pitching ===
==== Starting pitchers ====
Note: G = Games pitched; IP = Innings pitched; W = Wins; L = Losses; ERA = Earned run average; SO = Strikeouts

Player	G	IP	W	L	ERA	SO
Teddy Higuera	35	261.2	18	10	3.85	240
Bill Wegman	34	225.0	12	11	4.24	102
Juan Nieves	34	195.2	14	8	4.88	163
Mike Birkbeck	10	45.0	1	4	6.20	25
Len Barker	11	43.2	2	1	5.36	22
Mark Ciardi	4	16.1	1	1	9.37	8

==== Other pitchers ====
Note: G = Games pitched; IP = Innings pitched; W = Wins; L = Losses; ERA = Earned run average; SO = Strikeouts

Player	G	IP	W	L	ERA	SO
Chris Bosio	46	170.0	11	8	5.24	150
Mark Knudson	15	62.0	4	4	5.37	26
John Henry Johnson	10	26.1	0	1	9.57	18
Ray Burris	10	23.0	2	2	5.87	8

==== Relief pitchers ====
Note: G = Games pitched; W = Wins; L = Losses; SV = Saves; ERA = Earned run average; SO = Strikeouts

Player	G	W	L	SV	ERA	SO
Dan Plesac	57	5	6	23	2.61	89
Chuck Crim	53	6	8	12	3.67	56
Mark Clear	58	8	5	6	4.48	81
Paul Mirabella	29	2	1	2	4.91	14
Jay Aldrich	31	3	1	0	4.94	22
Dave Stapleton	4	2	0	0	1.84	14
Alex Madrid	3	0	0	0	15.19	1

== Awards and honors ==
- Paul Molitor, Hutch Award

== Farm system ==
The Brewers' farm system consisted of five minor league affiliates in 1987.

Level	Team	League	Manager
Triple-A	Denver Zephyrs	American Association	Terry Bevington
Double-A	El Paso Diablos	Texas League	Duffy Dyer
Class A	Stockton Ports	California League	Dave Machemer
Class A	Beloit Brewers	Midwest League	Gomer Hodge
Rookie	Helena Brewers	Pioneer League	Dave Huppert
