= 1988 Milwaukee Brewers season =

1988 Milwaukee Brewers
- League: American League
- Division: East
- Ballpark: Milwaukee County Stadium
- City: Milwaukee, Wisconsin, United States
- Record: 87–75 (.537)
- Divisional place: 3rd
- Owners: Bud Selig
- General managers: Harry Dalton
- Managers: Tom Trebelhorn
- Television: WVTV (Jim Paschke, Mike Hegan)
- Radio: WTMJ (AM) (Bob Uecker, Pat Hughes)

The 1988 Milwaukee Brewers season was the 19th season for the Brewers in Milwaukee, and their 20th overall. The Brewers finished third in the American League East with a record of 87 wins and 75 losses. During the franchise's 25-year playoff drought from 1983–2007, 1988 tied with 2007 with 2 games back as the closest the team came to making the playoffs.

== Offseason ==
- November 11, 1987: Bryan Clutterbuck was signed as a free agent with the Milwaukee Brewers.
- November 11, 1987: Bill Mooneyham was signed as a free agent by the Brewers.
- January 19, 1988: Ronn Reynolds was signed as a free agent with the Milwaukee Brewers.

== Regular season ==
- April 4, 1988: The largest margin of victory in a shutout win on Opening Day was the Brewers' 12-0 win over the Baltimore Orioles in 1988.
- April 19, 1988: The Orioles tied the 1904 Washington Senators and the 1920 Detroit Tigers for most losses to start the season with 13 losses after being beaten by the Brewers, 9–5, in Milwaukee.
- April 20, 1988: On a cold, wet night, 7,284 witnessed baseball history at Milwaukee's County Stadium. Baltimore became the first team in the 120-odd years of major league baseball to start the season 0–14 as the Brewers won, 8–6.
- June 12, 1988: Robin Yount had 6 RBIs in a game against the Baltimore Orioles.

=== Season standings ===
AL East
| Team | W | L | Pct. | GB | Home | Road |
|---|---|---|---|---|---|---|
| Boston Red Sox | 89 | 73 | .549 | — | 53‍–‍28 | 36‍–‍45 |
| Detroit Tigers | 88 | 74 | .543 | 1 | 50‍–‍31 | 38‍–‍43 |
| Milwaukee Brewers | 87 | 75 | .537 | 2 | 47‍–‍34 | 40‍–‍41 |
| Toronto Blue Jays | 87 | 75 | .537 | 2 | 45‍–‍36 | 42‍–‍39 |
| New York Yankees | 85 | 76 | .528 | 3½ | 46‍–‍34 | 39‍–‍42 |
| Cleveland Indians | 78 | 84 | .481 | 11 | 44‍–‍37 | 34‍–‍47 |
| Baltimore Orioles | 54 | 107 | .335 | 34½ | 34‍–‍46 | 20‍–‍61 |

=== Record vs. opponents ===
1988 American League record Sources:
| Team | BAL | BOS | CAL | CWS | CLE | DET | KC | MIL | MIN | NYY | OAK | SEA | TEX | TOR |
|---|---|---|---|---|---|---|---|---|---|---|---|---|---|---|
| Baltimore | — | 4–9 | 5–7 | 4–7 | 4–9 | 5–8 | 0–12 | 4–9 | 3–9 | 3–10 | 4–8 | 7–5 | 6–6 | 5–8 |
| Boston | 9–4 | — | 8–4 | 7–5 | 8–5 | 6–7 | 6–6 | 10–3 | 7–5 | 9–4 | 3–9 | 6–6 | 8–4 | 2–11 |
| California | 7–5 | 4–8 | — | 9–4 | 8–4 | 5–7 | 5–8 | 3–9 | 4–9 | 6–6 | 4–9 | 6–7 | 8–5 | 6–6 |
| Chicago | 7–4 | 5–7 | 4–9 | — | 3–9 | 3–9 | 7–6 | 6–6 | 4–9 | 3–9 | 5–8 | 9–4 | 8–5 | 7–5 |
| Cleveland | 9–4 | 5–8 | 4–8 | 9–3 | — | 4–9 | 6–6 | 9–4 | 5–7 | 6–7 | 4–8 | 5–7 | 6–6 | 6–7 |
| Detroit | 8–5 | 7–6 | 7–5 | 9–3 | 9–4 | — | 8–4 | 5–8 | 1–11 | 8–5 | 4–8 | 9–3 | 8–4 | 5–8 |
| Kansas City | 12–0 | 6–6 | 8–5 | 6–7 | 6–6 | 4–8 | — | 3–9 | 7–6 | 6–6 | 8–5 | 7–5 | 7–6 | 4–8 |
| Milwaukee | 9–4 | 3–10 | 9–3 | 6–6 | 4–9 | 8–5 | 9–3 | — | 7–5 | 6–7 | 3–9 | 8–4 | 8–4 | 7–6 |
| Minnesota | 9–3 | 5–7 | 9–4 | 9–4 | 7–5 | 11–1 | 6–7 | 5–7 | — | 3–9 | 5–8 | 8–5 | 7–6 | 7–5 |
| New York | 10–3 | 4–9 | 6–6 | 9–3 | 7–6 | 5–8 | 6–6 | 7–6 | 9–3 | — | 6–6 | 5–7 | 5–6 | 6–7 |
| Oakland | 8–4 | 9–3 | 9–4 | 8–5 | 8–4 | 8–4 | 5–8 | 9–3 | 8–5 | 6–6 | — | 9–4 | 8–5 | 9–3 |
| Seattle | 5–7 | 6–6 | 7–6 | 4–9 | 7–5 | 3–9 | 5–7 | 4–8 | 5–8 | 7–5 | 4–9 | — | 6–7 | 5–7 |
| Texas | 6–6 | 4–8 | 5–8 | 5–8 | 6–6 | 4–8 | 6–7 | 4–8 | 6–7 | 6–5 | 5–8 | 7–6 | — | 6–6 |
| Toronto | 8–5 | 11–2 | 6–6 | 5–7 | 7–6 | 8–5 | 8–4 | 6–7 | 5–7 | 7–6 | 3–9 | 7–5 | 6–6 | — |

=== Notable transactions ===
- June 1, 1988: 1988 Major League Baseball draft
  - Pat Listach was drafted by the Brewers in the 5th round. Player signed June 28, 1988.
  - Mike Ignasiak was drafted by the Brewers in the 8th round.
- June 8, 1988: Ernest Riles was traded by the Brewers to the San Francisco Giants for Jeffrey Leonard.

=== Roster ===
1988 Milwaukee Brewers
Roster
| Pitchers: 38 Don August; 40 Mike Birkbeck; 29 Chris Bosio; 25 Mark Clear; 32 Chuck Crim; 39 Tom Filer; 49 Teddy Higuera; 28 Odell Jones; 41 Mark Knudson; 27 Paul Mirabella; 20 Juan Nieves; 37 Dan Plesac; 43 Dave Stapleton; 46 Bill Wegman | Catchers: 22 Charlie O'Brien; 21 Bill Schroeder; 5 B. J. Surhoff; Infielders: 9 Greg Brock; 3 Juan Castillo; 17 Jim Gantner; 30 Steve Kiefer; 23 Joey Meyer; 4 Paul Molitor; 1 Ernest Riles; 13 Billy Jo Robidoux; 1 Gary Sheffield; 7 Dale Sveum | Outfielders: 14 Jim Adduci; 26 Glenn Braggs; 45 Rob Deer; 16 Mike Felder; 18 Darryl Hamilton; 00 Jeffrey Leonard; 2 Mike Young; 19 Robin Yount | Manager: 42 Tom Trebelhorn; Coaches: 8 Andy Etchebarren; 12 Larry Haney; 24 Chuck Hartenstein; 10 Dave Hilton; 35 Tony Muser |

== Player stats ==
=== Batting ===
==== Starters by position ====
Note: Pos = Position; G = Games played; AB = At bats; H = Hits; Avg. = Batting average; HR = Home runs; RBI = Runs batted in

| Pos | Player | G | AB | H | Avg. | HR | RBI |
|---|---|---|---|---|---|---|---|
| C | B. J. Surhoff | 139 | 493 | 121 | .245 | 5 | 38 |
| 1B | Greg Brock | 115 | 364 | 77 | .212 | 6 | 50 |
| 2B | Jim Gantner | 155 | 539 | 149 | .276 | 0 | 47 |
| SS | Dale Sveum | 129 | 467 | 113 | .242 | 9 | 51 |
| 3B | Paul Molitor | 154 | 609 | 190 | .312 | 13 | 60 |
| LF | Jeffrey Leonard | 94 | 374 | 88 | .235 | 8 | 44 |
| CF | Robin Yount | 162 | 621 | 190 | .306 | 13 | 91 |
| RF | Rob Deer | 135 | 492 | 124 | .252 | 23 | 85 |
| DH | Joey Meyer | 103 | 327 | 86 | .263 | 11 | 45 |

==== Other batters ====
Note: G = Games played; AB = At bats; H = Hits; Avg. = Batting average; HR = Home runs; RBI = Runs batted in

| Player | G | AB | H | Avg. | HR | RBI |
|---|---|---|---|---|---|---|
| Glenn Braggs | 72 | 272 | 71 | .261 | 10 | 42 |
| Ernest Riles | 41 | 127 | 32 | .252 | 1 | 9 |
| Bill Schroeder | 41 | 122 | 19 | .156 | 5 | 10 |
| Charlie O'Brien | 40 | 118 | 26 | .220 | 2 | 9 |
| Darryl Hamilton | 44 | 103 | 19 | .184 | 1 | 11 |
| Jim Adduci | 44 | 94 | 25 | .266 | 1 | 15 |
| Billy Jo Robidoux | 33 | 91 | 23 | .253 | 0 | 5 |
| Juan Castillo | 54 | 90 | 20 | .222 | 0 | 2 |
| Mike Felder | 50 | 81 | 14 | .173 | 0 | 5 |
| Gary Sheffield | 24 | 80 | 19 | .238 | 4 | 12 |
| Mike Young | 8 | 14 | 0 | .000 | 0 | 0 |
| Steve Kiefer | 7 | 10 | 3 | .300 | 1 | 1 |

=== Pitching ===
==== Starting pitchers ====
Note: G = Games pitched; IP = Innings pitched; W = Wins; L = Losses; ERA = Earned run average; SO = Strikeouts

| Player | G | IP | W | L | ERA | SO |
|---|---|---|---|---|---|---|
| Teddy Higuera | 31 | 227.1 | 16 | 9 | 2.45 | 192 |
| Bill Wegman | 32 | 199.0 | 13 | 13 | 4.12 | 84 |
| Don August | 24 | 148.1 | 13 | 7 | 3.09 | 66 |
| Mike Birkbeck | 23 | 124.0 | 10 | 8 | 4.72 | 64 |
| Tom Filer | 19 | 101.2 | 5 | 8 | 4.43 | 39 |

==== Other pitchers ====
Note: G = Games pitched; IP = Innings pitched; W = Wins; L = Losses; ERA = Earned run average; SO = Strikeouts

| Player | G | IP | W | L | ERA | SO |
|---|---|---|---|---|---|---|
| Chris Bosio | 38 | 182.0 | 7 | 15 | 3.36 | 84 |
| Juan Nieves | 25 | 110.1 | 7 | 5 | 4.08 | 73 |

==== Relief pitchers ====
Note: G = Games pitched; W = Wins; L = Losses; SV = Saves; ERA = Earned run average; SO = Strikeouts

| Player | G | W | L | SV | ERA | SO |
|---|---|---|---|---|---|---|
| Dan Plesac | 50 | 1 | 2 | 30 | 2.41 | 52 |
| Chuck Crim | 70 | 7 | 6 | 9 | 2.91 | 58 |
| Paul Mirabella | 38 | 2 | 2 | 4 | 1.65 | 33 |
| Odell Jones | 28 | 5 | 0 | 1 | 4.35 | 48 |
| Mark Clear | 25 | 1 | 0 | 0 | 2.79 | 26 |
| Dave Stapleton | 6 | 0 | 0 | 0 | 5.93 | 6 |
| Mark Knudson | 5 | 0 | 0 | 0 | 1.13 | 7 |

== Farm system ==
The Brewers' farm system consisted of six minor league affiliates in 1988. The AZL Brewers won the Arizona League championship.

| Level | Team | League | Manager |
|---|---|---|---|
| Triple-A | Denver Zephyrs | American Association | Duffy Dyer |
| Double-A | El Paso Diablos | Texas League | Dave Machemer |
| Class A | Stockton Ports | California League | Dave Huppert |
| Class A | Beloit Brewers | Midwest League | Gomer Hodge |
| Rookie | AZL Brewers | Arizona League | Alex Taveras |
| Rookie | Helena Brewers | Pioneer League | Dusty Rhodes |
