= 1989 Milwaukee Brewers season =

1989 Milwaukee Brewers
- League: American League
- Division: East
- Ballpark: Milwaukee County Stadium
- City: Milwaukee, Wisconsin, United States
- Record: 81–81 (.500)
- Divisional place: 4th
- Owners: Bud Selig
- General managers: Harry Dalton
- Managers: Tom Trebelhorn
- Television: WCGV-TV (Jim Paschke, Pete Vuckovich)
- Radio: WTMJ (AM) (Bob Uecker, Pat Hughes)

The 1989 Milwaukee Brewers season was the 20th season for the Brewers in Milwaukee, and their 21st overall. The Brewers finished fourth in the American League East with a record of 81 wins and 81 losses. The Brewers led MLB with 165 stolen bases.

== Offseason ==
- October 26, 1988: Steve Stanicek was released by the Brewers.
- December 20, 1988: Jim Gantner was signed as a free agent by the Brewers.
- March 30, 1989: Terry Francona was signed as a free agent by the Brewers.
- March 30, 1989: Dave Engel was signed as a free agent with the Milwaukee Brewers.

== Regular season ==
- During the season, Robin Yount had a 19-game hitting streak. Yount finished the season leading the Brewers in RBIs for the third straight season.

=== Notable transactions ===
- June 5, 1989: Jason Giambi was drafted by the Brewers in the 43rd round of the 1989 Major League Baseball draft, but did not sign.
- August 2, 1989: Dave Engel was released by the Milwaukee Brewers.
- August 23, 1989: The Milwaukee Brewers traded a player to be named later to the Atlanta Braves for Ed Romero. The Brewers completed the deal by sending Jay Aldrich to the Braves on September 1.

=== Season standings ===
AL East
Team	W	L	Pct.	GB	Home	Road
Toronto Blue Jays	89	73	.549	—	46‍–‍35	43‍–‍38
Baltimore Orioles	87	75	.537	2	47‍–‍34	40‍–‍41
Boston Red Sox	83	79	.512	6	46‍–‍35	37‍–‍44
Milwaukee Brewers	81	81	.500	8	45‍–‍36	36‍–‍45
New York Yankees	74	87	.460	14½	41‍–‍40	33‍–‍47
Cleveland Indians	73	89	.451	16	41‍–‍40	32‍–‍49
Detroit Tigers	59	103	.364	30	38‍–‍43	21‍–‍60

=== Record vs. opponents ===
1989 American League record Sources:
Team	BAL	BOS	CAL	CWS	CLE	DET	KC	MIL	MIN	NYY	OAK	SEA	TEX	TOR
Baltimore	—	6–7	6–6	6–6	7–6	10–3	6–6	7–6	4–8	8–5	5–7	6–6	9–3	7–6
Boston	7–6	—	4–8	7–5	8–5	11–2	4–8	6–7	6–6	7–6	7–5	5–7	6–6	5–8
California	6–6	8–4	—	8–5	5–7	11–1	4–9	7–5	11–2	6–6	5–8	7–6	6–7	7–5
Chicago	6–6	5–7	5–8	—	7–5	4–8	6–7	10–2	5–8	5–6	5–8	7–6	3–10	1–11
Cleveland	6–7	5–8	7–5	5–7	—	5–8	8–4	3–10	5–7	9–4	2–10	6–6	7–5	5–8
Detroit	3–10	2–11	1–11	8–4	8–5	—	6–6	6–7	5–7	6–7	4–8	4–8	4–8	2–11
Kansas City	6–6	8–4	9–4	7–6	4–8	6–6	—	8–4	7–6	6–6	7–6	9–4	8–5	7–5
Milwaukee	6–7	7–6	5–7	2–10	10–3	7–6	4–8	—	9–3	8–5	5–7	7–5	5–7	6–7
Minnesota	8–4	6–6	2–11	8–5	7–5	7–5	6–7	3–9	—	6–6	6–7	7–6	5–8	9–3
New York	5–8	6–7	6–6	6–5	4–9	7–6	6–6	5–8	6–6	—	3–9	8–4	5–7	7–6
Oakland	7–5	5–7	8–5	8–5	10–2	8–4	6–7	7–5	7–6	9–3	—	9–4	8–5	7–5
Seattle	6–6	7–5	6–7	6–7	6–6	8–4	4–9	5–7	6–7	4–8	4–9	—	6–7	5–7
Texas	3–9	6–6	7–6	10–3	5–7	8–4	5–8	7–5	8–5	7–5	5–8	7–6	—	5–7
Toronto	6–7	8–5	5–7	11–1	8–5	11–2	5–7	7–6	3–9	6–7	5–7	7–5	7–5	—

=== First SkyDome Game ===
The Brewers played in the first baseball game at the SkyDome. The game was played on June 5 against the Toronto Blue Jays, and the Brewers won by a score of 5-3. Don August was the winning pitcher as he won his 5th game of the season, while Toronto's Jimmy Key lost his 4th game of the season. The attendance at SkyDome was 48,378.

==== Linescore ====
June 5, SkyDome, Toronto, Canada

Team	1	2	3	4	5	6	7	8	9	R	H	E
Milwaukee	1	0	1	2	1	0	0	0	0	5	9	0
Toronto	0	2	0	0	0	0	0	1	0	3	8	0
W: Don August (5-6) L: Jimmy Key (6-4) SV: Dan Plesac (13)
Home Runs: Braggs (10), McGriff (13), Bell (8) Attendance: 48,378 Time: 2:43

=== Roster ===
Milwaukee Brewers
Roster
Pitchers: 33 Jay Aldrich; 38 Don August; 40 Mike Birkbeck; 29 Chris Bosio; 48 Bryan Clutterbuck; 32 Chuck Crim; 39 Tom Filer; 36 Tony Fossas; 49 Teddy Higuera; 41 Mark Knudson; 36 Ray Krawczyk; 47 Bill Kreuger; 27 Paul Mirabella; 31 Jaime Navarro; 28 Jeff Peterek; 37 Dan Plesac; 21 Jerry Reuss; 43 Randy Veres; 46 Bill Wegman	Catchers: 22 Charlie O'Brien; 5 B. J. Surhoff; Infielders: 34 Billy Bates; 9 Greg Brock; 33 George Canale; 3 Juan Castillo; 25 Dave Engle; 30 Terry Francona; 17 Jim Gantner; 23 Joey Meyer; 4 Paul Molitor; 14 Gus Polidor; 15 Ed Romero; 1,11 Gary Sheffield; 6 Bill Spiers	Outfielders: 26 Glenn Braggs; 45 Rob Deer; 16 Mike Felder; 11 La Vel Freeman; 25 Greg Vaughn; 19 Robin Yount	Manager: 42 Tom Trebelhorn; Coaches: 31 Duffy Dyer; 8 Andy Etchebarren; 12 Larry Haney; 24 Chuck Hartenstein; 35 Tony Muser

== Player stats ==
= Indicates team leader

=== Batting ===
==== Starters by position ====
Note: Pos = Position; G = Games played; AB = At bats; H = Hits; Avg. = Batting average; HR = Home runs; RBI = Runs batted in

Pos	Player	G	AB	H	Avg.	HR	RBI
C	B. J. Surhoff	126	436	108	.248	5	55
1B	Greg Brock	107	373	99	.265	12	52
2B	Jim Gantner	116	409	112	.274	0	34
3B	Paul Molitor	155	615	194	.315	11	56
SS	Bill Spiers	114	345	88	.255	4	33
LF	Glenn Braggs	144	514	127	.247	15	66
CF	Robin Yount	160	614	195	.318	21	103
RF	Rob Deer	130	466	98	.210	26	65
DH	Joey Meyer	53	147	33	.224	7	29

==== Other batters ====
Note: G = Games played; AB = At bats; H = Hits; Avg. = Batting average; HR = Home runs; RBI = Runs batted in

Player	G	AB	H	Avg.	HR	RBI
Gary Sheffield	95	368	91	.247	5	32
Mike Felder	117	315	76	.241	3	23
Terry Francona	89	233	54	.232	3	23
Gus Polidor	79	175	34	.194	0	14
Charlie O'Brien	40	118	26	.220	2	9
Greg Vaughn	38	113	30	.265	5	23
Dave Engle	27	65	14	.215	2	8
Ed Romero	15	50	10	.200	0	3
George Canale	13	26	5	.192	1	3
Billy Bates	7	14	3	.214	0	0
Juan Castillo	3	4	0	.000	0	3
LaVel Freeman	2	3	0	.000	0	0

=== Pitching ===
==== Starting pitchers ====
Note: G = Games pitched; IP = Innings pitched; W = Wins; L = Losses; ERA = Earned run average; SO = Strikeouts

Player	G	IP	W	L	ERA	SO
Chris Bosio	33	235.0	15	10	2.95	173
Don August	31	142.1	12	12	5.31	51
Teddy Higuera	22	135.1	9	6	3.46	91
Jaime Navarro	19	109.2	7	8	3.12	56
Tom Filer	13	72.1	7	3	3.61	20
Bryan Clutterbuck	14	67.1	2	5	4.14	29
Bill Wegman	11	51.0	2	6	6.71	27
Mike Birkbeck	9	44.2	0	4	5.44	31
Jerry Reuss	7	33.2	1	4	5.35	13

==== Other pitchers ====
Note: G = Games pitched; IP = Innings pitched; W = Wins; L = Losses; ERA = Earned run average; SO = Strikeouts

Player	G	IP	W	L	ERA	SO
Mark Knudson	40	123.2	8	5	3.35	47
Bill Krueger	34	93.2	3	2	3.84	72
Jeff Peterek	7	31.1	0	2	4.02	16
Randy Veres	3	8.1	0	1	4.32	8

==== Relief pitchers ====
Note: G = Games pitched; W = Wins; L = Losses; SV = Saves; ERA = Earned run average; SO = Strikeouts

Player	G	W	L	SV	ERA	SO
Dan Plesac	52	3	4	33	2.35	52
Chuck Crim	76	9	7	7	2.83	59
Tony Fossas	51	2	2	1	3.54	42
Jay Aldrich	16	1	0	1	3.81	12
Paul Mirabella	13	0	0	0	7.63	6
Ray Krawczyk	1	0	0	0	13.50	6
Terry Francona	1	0	0	0	0.00	1

== Awards and honors ==
- Robin Yount – American League Most Valuable Player

All-Star Game

- Dan Plesac, pitcher, reserve

== Farm system ==
The Brewers' farm system consisted of seven minor league affiliates in 1989. The Brewers operated a Dominican Summer League team as a co-op with the Boston Red Sox and Baltimore Orioles. The AZL Brewers won the Arizona League championship.

Level	Team	League	Manager
Triple-A	Denver Zephyrs	American Association	Dave Machemer
Double-A	El Paso Diablos	Texas League	Marc Bombard
Class A	Stockton Ports	California League	Dave Huppert
Class A	Beloit Brewers	Midwest League	Alex Taveras
Rookie	Helena Brewers	Pioneer League	Dusty Rhodes
Rookie	AZL Brewers	Arizona League	Jeff Nate
Rookie	DSL Red Sox/Orioles/Brewers	Dominican Summer League	—
