= Jaime Navarro =

Puerto Rican baseball player (born 1967)

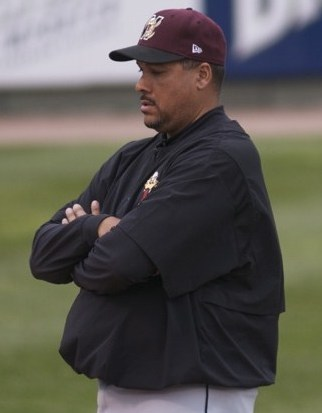
- Navarro in 2008

Wei Chuan Dragons
- Pitcher / Coach
- Born: March 27, 1967 (age 59); Bayamón, Puerto Rico
- Batted: Right Threw: Right

MLB debut
- June 20, 1989, for the Milwaukee Brewers

Last MLB appearance
- July 26, 2000, for the Cleveland Indians

MLB statistics
- Win–loss record: 116–126
- Earned run average: 4.72
- Strikeouts: 1,113
- Stats at Baseball Reference

Teams
- Milwaukee Brewers (1989–1994); Chicago Cubs (1995–1996); Chicago White Sox (1997–1999); Milwaukee Brewers (2000); Cleveland Indians (2000)

Career highlights and awards
- Milwaukee Brewers Wall of Honor

Jaime Navarro Cintrón (born March 27, 1967) is a Puerto Rican former professional baseball pitcher who is the current pitching coach for the Wei Chuan-Dragons of Taiwan's Chinese Professional Baseball League (CPBL). Navarro was a 6-foot, 4-inch tall right-handed pitcher in the major leagues (MLB) from 1989 to 2000, playing for the Milwaukee Brewers, Chicago Cubs, Chicago White Sox, and Cleveland Indians. He is the son of former Major League Baseball pitcher Julio Navarro.

== Playing career ==
=== Early years ===
After graduating from Luis Pales Matos High School in Santa Rosa, Puerto Rico, Navarro was drafted by the Baltimore Orioles in the 2nd round of the January 1986 amateur draft, but did not sign. On June 2, 1986, Navarro was drafted again by the Orioles in the 2nd round, but he still did not sign. Exactly a year later, in the 1987 June amateur draft, Navarro was drafted by the Milwaukee Brewers as the 71st overall pick in the third round, and he signed with the team two days later. Navarro spent the rest of the 1987 season and the following two seasons playing in the Brewers minor league system, working his way up from the rookie-level with the Helena Brewers to Triple-A with the Denver Zephyrs.

=== Milwaukee Brewers ===
Only weeks into the 1989 minor league baseball season, Navarro was called up to the majors. He made his debut on June 20, 1989, starting in front a crowd of 17,185 fans at County Stadium in a pitching duel against the Kansas City Royals' Charlie Leibrandt. Navarro tossed six innings of quality baseball, giving up eight hits and one earned run, while walking two and striking out two. Leibrandt pitched equally well and the game was ultimately decided by each team's relief pitchers. Brewers pitcher Mark Knudson gave up six runs in the 11th inning, and cost Navarro his first major league win. Navarro eventually picked up his first major league win five days later in a 3–1 victory against pitcher Jerry Reuss and the Chicago White Sox at home. Navarro continued as Brewers starting pitcher for the rest of the season, pitching in a total of nineteen games during the season. He posted a 7–8 record, with a 3.12 earned run average, 56 strikeouts, and a complete game on September 26. The following season, Navarro was sent back to the Class-AAA ball with the Denver Zephyrs.

Navarro was called up to the majors after a starting the season in the minors, and he spent the rest of the 1990 season as a starter/reliever for the Brewers. The Brewers took note of Navarro's skill, and the 24-year-old was one of the team's five starting pitchers for the following season. In his first full season as a starter, Navarro posted a 15–12 record and a 3.92 earned run average. He also had ten complete games, two shutouts, and 114 strikeouts. Navarro had an even better season the following year, finishing with a 17–11 record, a 3.33 ERA and 100 strikeouts.

However, the following two seasons proved disastrous for Navarro, as he gave up a league-high and Brewers team record 127 earned runs and 254 hits in 214.1 innings of work. With an 11–12 record and a 5.33 ERA in 1993, the Brewers decided to split Navarro between starting and relieving jobs for the 1994 season. In his first start of the season, on April 11, 1994, Navarro was the winning pitcher for the inaugural Texas Rangers baseball game at The Ballpark in Arlington. Through the season, Navarro showed no sign of improvement, finishing the season with a 4–9 record and 6.62 ERA. Left with few options, the Brewers granted Navarro free agency on April 7, 1995.

=== Chicago Cubs ===
Two days after being granted free agency, Navarro signed with the Chicago Cubs. Navarro started in 29 games for the Cubs that year, and posted much-improved numbers on the season. He led the team in many pitching categories that year, such as wins and innings pitched. Navarro was granted free agency on November 1, but on December 8, 1995, he accepted the Cubs' salary arbitration offer, and then agreed to a $3.4 million contract for the 1996 season. Navarro led the team again in 1996 with a 15–12 record, 3.92 earned run average, four complete games and 158 strikeouts. Oddly enough, Navarro also led the league in batters faced and hits allowed. On October 28, 1996, Navarro was again granted free agency by the Cubs and he signed to a four-year, $20 million contract with the crosstown rivals of the Cubs, the White Sox, on December 11.

=== Chicago White Sox ===
The three years (1997–1999) that Navarro spent with the White Sox were far from a success. Along with a lowly 9–14 record and a league-high 5.79 ERA, Navarro led the league in wild pitches, hits allowed, earned runs allowed in 1997. One of Navarro's only highlights of the 1997 season was his surprising dominance against the Boston Red Sox; most memorable is a 10–1 victory against the team on May 20, which gave Navarro his 10th straight win against the Red Sox, dating back to September 28, 1991. The 1998 season was just as disappointing for Navarro, as he finished with a dismal 8–16 record and a league-high 6.36 ERA, and led the league in wild pitches and losses. Navarro showed no improvement the following year either, and the White Sox traded Navarro and fellow pitcher John Snyder to the Milwaukee Brewers for pitcher Cal Eldred and infielder José Valentín.

=== Minor leagues ===
Navarro became another addition to the starting rotation of the Brewers for the beginning of the 2000 season. In five starts with the team, he only pitched 18 2/3 innings, posted an 0–5 record, gave up eighteen walks, and had an ERA of 12.54. Less than a month into the season, the Brewers released him. Sixteen days later, he was signed as a free agent by the Colorado Rockies. The Rockies sent Navarro back down to Triple-A baseball with the Colorado Springs Sky Sox in the Pacific Coast League. He showed some improvement in Triple-A, but he was released by the Rockies a month after being signed by the team. The next day, the Cleveland Indians picked up Navarro as a free agent, and he agreed to be sent back down to Triple-A with the Buffalo Bisons in the International League, after Indians manager Charlie Manuel suggested he learn to be a reliever.

Navarro was later called up to the big leagues in a role as a starter/reliever, and he did not fare well in his return to the big leagues. This was the last time he played in the major leagues, as Navarro was later designated for assignment to clear up space on the Indians' 40-man roster. He played with the Bisons for the remainder of the 2000 season before being granted free agency by the Indians on October 2. He was signed by the Toronto Blue Jays on December 13, and subsequently released on March 11, 2001.

Nearly a year later, on January 31, 2002, the St. Louis Cardinals agreed to terms on a minor league contract with Navarro and assigned him to the Triple-A Memphis Redbirds of the Pacific Coast League. More than a year later, Navarro signed with the Cincinnati Reds to play for the Triple-A Louisville Bats of the International League. Navarro looked much better after only giving up three earned runs in ten innings of work in two starts for Louisville. However, he was released by the Reds on June 6, 2003. Later, he played with the unaffiliated Newark Bears of the Atlantic League as a starting pitcher. After his stint with the Bears, Navarro did not play professional baseball in the U.S. again.

=== Italian baseball ===
Navarro spent three years pitching in Italy for Bbc Grosseto of the Italian Baseball League. His 18 wins and 1.76 ERA helped his team win the 2004 Italian League and play in the European Champions League, which Grosseto won in 2005 and Navarro was named MVP. In the early months of the 2005 season, Navarro had a serious bike accident that cost him the rest of the season, but he managed to come back for the 2006 season, finishing 9–7 with a 2.03 ERA.

=== Record ===
The Navarros (Jaime and his father Julio) were the first father and son to each record a major league save. They were followed by Pedro Borbón and Pedro Borbón, Jr.; Steve Grilli and Jason Grilli; and Jeff Russell and James Russell.

In 2014, Navarro was inducted into the Milwaukee Brewers Wall of Honor.

== Coaching career ==
Days after the 2006 season's finale, Navarro had a rough discussion with Grosseto management and decided not to pitch again in Italy. In 2008, he was the pitching coach for the Wisconsin Timber Rattlers of the Midwest League. On January 13, 2009, Navarro was named the pitching coach for the Single-A High Desert Mavericks. After the 2009 season, Navarro was named as the pitching coach for the Triple-A Tacoma Rainiers of the Pacific Coast League.

Navarro was the Mariners' bullpen coach from 2011 to 2013. Navarro was released by the Seattle Mariners organization, along with 9 other coaches, after the 2015 season.

From 2016 to 2019, Navarro was the pitching coach for the Pericos de Puebla, winning the championship in 2016 and Acereros de Monclova for the Mexican League. In 2020, he was the pitching coach for the Uni-President 7-Eleven Lions of the Chinese Professional Baseball League, winning the Taiwan Series in 2020.

On March 5, 2025, the Piratas de Campeche of the Mexican League hired Navarro as their pitching coach. After the 2025 season he left the Mexican League and become the pitching coach for the Wei Chuan Dragons of Taiwan's Chinese Professional Baseball League.

== See also ==
- List of Major League Baseball players from Puerto Rico
- List of second-generation Major League Baseball players
