= Bill Schroeder (baseball) =

American baseball player and commentator (born 1958)

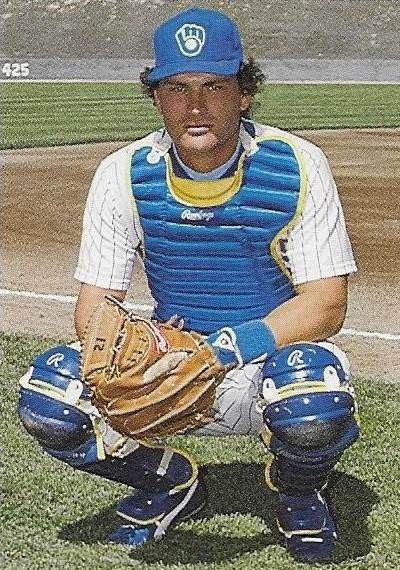
- Catcher
- Born: September 7, 1958 (age 68); Baltimore, Maryland, U.S.
- Batted: Right Threw: Right

MLB debut
- July 13, 1983, for the Milwaukee Brewers

Last MLB appearance
- September 9, 1990, for the California Angels

MLB statistics
- Batting average: .240
- Home runs: 61
- Runs batted in: 152
- Stats at Baseball Reference

Teams
- Milwaukee Brewers (1983–1988); California Angels (1989–1990)

Career highlights and awards
- Milwaukee Brewers Wall of Honor

Alfred William Schroeder (/ˈʃroʊdər/ SHROH-dər; born September 7, 1958) is an American former Major League Baseball player and a current television sports broadcaster. He played for the Milwaukee Brewers and California Angels between 1983 and 1990. Since 1995, Schroeder has been the primary color commentator on Brewers telecasts.

== Early life ==
Schroeder was born in Baltimore, Maryland, and raised in the Princeton Junction of West Windsor, New Jersey. He is a graduate of West Windsor-Plainsboro High School (now West Windsor-Plainsboro High School South). While playing high school baseball, he earned All-State honors in his junior and senior years. He attended Clemson University, and assisted the Clemson Tigers in capturing the Atlantic Coast Conference Championships in 1978 and 1979.

In 1978, Schroeder played collegiate summer baseball for the Hyannis Mets of the Cape Cod Baseball League (CCBL). He led the league in home runs and RBI, and led the Mets to the league title. Schroeder was named the league's MVP and outstanding pro prospect, and was inducted into the CCBL Hall of Fame in 2009.

== Playing career ==
He was selected by the Milwaukee Brewers in the eighth round of the 1979 amateur draft. Throughout his career, he was typically used as a platoon or bench player.

Until the 2007 season, Schroeder was the fastest Brewers rookie to reach 15 home runs, achieving the milestone in only 71 games. In 2007, the record was bested by Ryan Braun, who hit 15 home runs in his first 50 games.

The 1987 season was Schroeder's best. He batted .332, and was a key member of "Team Streak", the Brewers team that won its first 13 games, tying an MLB record. On April 15, 1987, Schroeder caught the first no-hitter and only no-hitter by a single pitcher in Brewers' history, pitched by Juan Nieves. On May 16, 1987, with the Brewers playing the Kansas City Royals, Schroeder broke up a no-hitter by Royals pitcher Charlie Leibrandt with a bunt single. That would prove to be the only hit of the game. He was also the starting catcher for the American League All stars in Nintendo's popular video game, RBI Baseball for 1987.

In 1988, he was traded to the California Angels, where he played less and was less productive than in Milwaukee. In 1990, he was released by the Angels, retiring shortly thereafter.

== Announcing career ==
Schroeder began his post-playing career by appearing as an analyst for a Milwaukee-area baseball television show, Baseball Sunday, in 1994. For the following season, he was asked to be the color commentator for the Milwaukee Brewers' television broadcasts, a position he has held ever since. He is currently primarily paired with Brian Anderson or Jeff Levering. He has appeared on occasional national broadcasts, including on Opening Day in 2025 alongside Joe Buck.

Schroeder additionally appeared on WTMJ Radio's Talking Brewers from 1998 to 2000.

Schroeder manages the Brewers Fantasy Camp in Maryvale, Phoenix, Arizona.
