= Milwaukee Brewers Wall of Honor =

Exhibit at American Family Field in Milwaukee, Wisconsin

Coordinates: 43°01′43.8″N 87°58′11.1″W

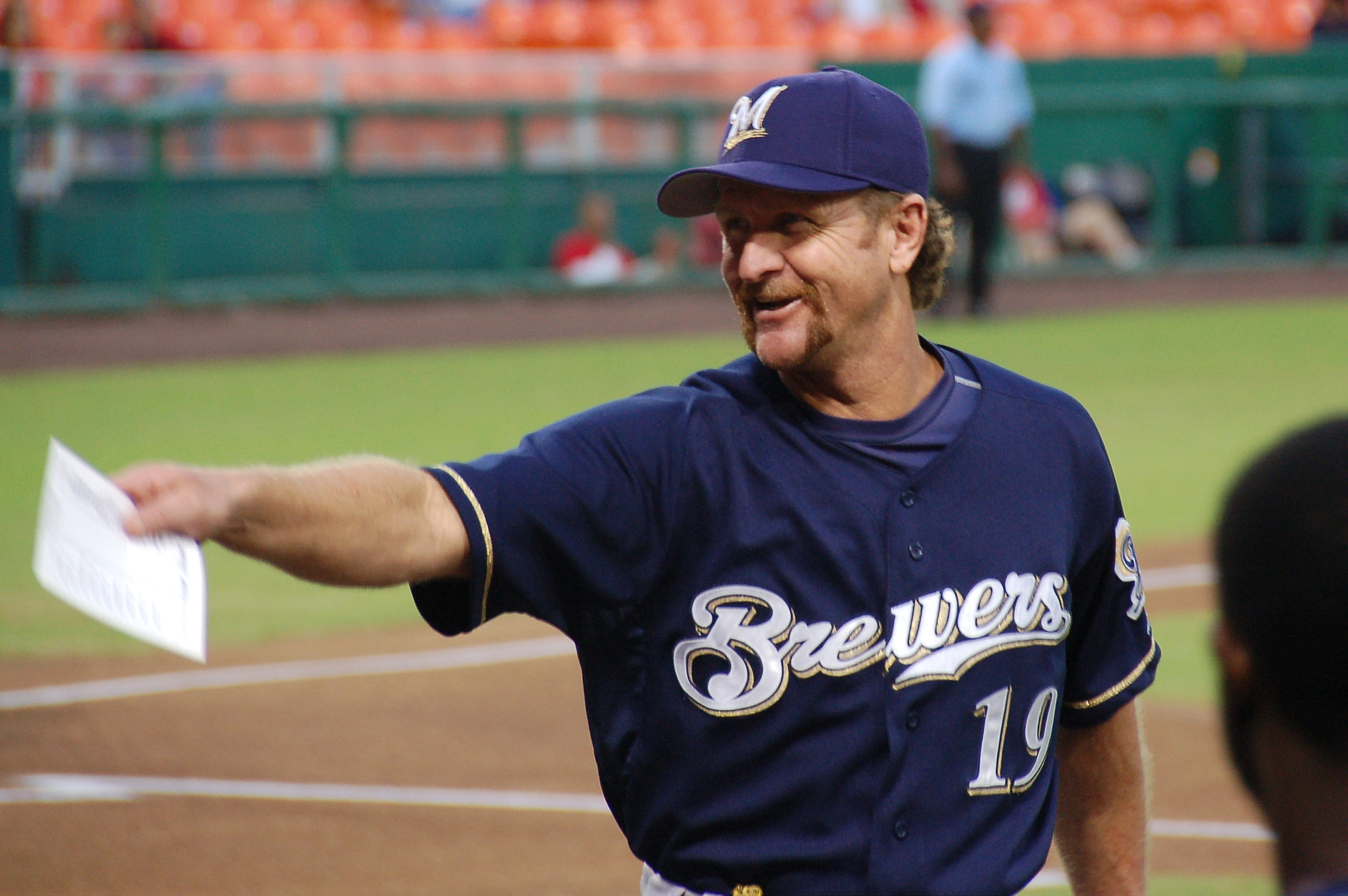
Robin Yount, a member of the Milwaukee Brewers Wall of Honor and the Baseball Hall of Fame, had over 12,000 plate appearances and won two AL MVP Awards (1982 & 1989) from 1974 to 1993.

The Milwaukee Brewers Wall of Honor is an exhibit located at American Family Field in Milwaukee, Wisconsin, that commemorates baseball players, coaches, executives, and broadcasters who have made significant contributions to the Milwaukee Brewers Major League Baseball team and meet set criteria regarding career milestones or service time.

Established by the Brewers in 2014, the initial Wall of Fame class consisted of 58 inductees. As of 2026, seventy-four individuals have been inducted. Each member is honored with a bronze plaque bearing their image and a summary of their Brewers career, which is affixed to an exterior wall by the Hot Corner entrance in left field.

== Criteria ==
Unlike the American Family Field Walk of Fame exhibit, which selects individuals from both the Milwaukee Brewers and Milwaukee Braves through a vote by Wisconsin media members and Brewers executives, only retired Brewers who met at least one of nine criteria while with Milwaukee are inducted to the Wall of Honor. The original class of 58 inductees were added based on seven conditions. Two additional criteria were added in 2015 and 2018. These nine conditions are:

- 2,000 or more plate appearances
- 1,000 or more innings pitched
- 250 or more games pitched
- Winning a Most Valuable Player Award, Cy Young Award, Rookie of the Year Award, or Reliever of the Year Award
- Managing a pennant-winning team
- Being recognized with a statue on American Family Field's plaza
- Being elected to the National Baseball Hall of Fame
- Serving as a primary broadcaster for 20 or more seasons after playing career
- Serving as general manager for 10 years or more and reaching the postseason

== Inductees ==
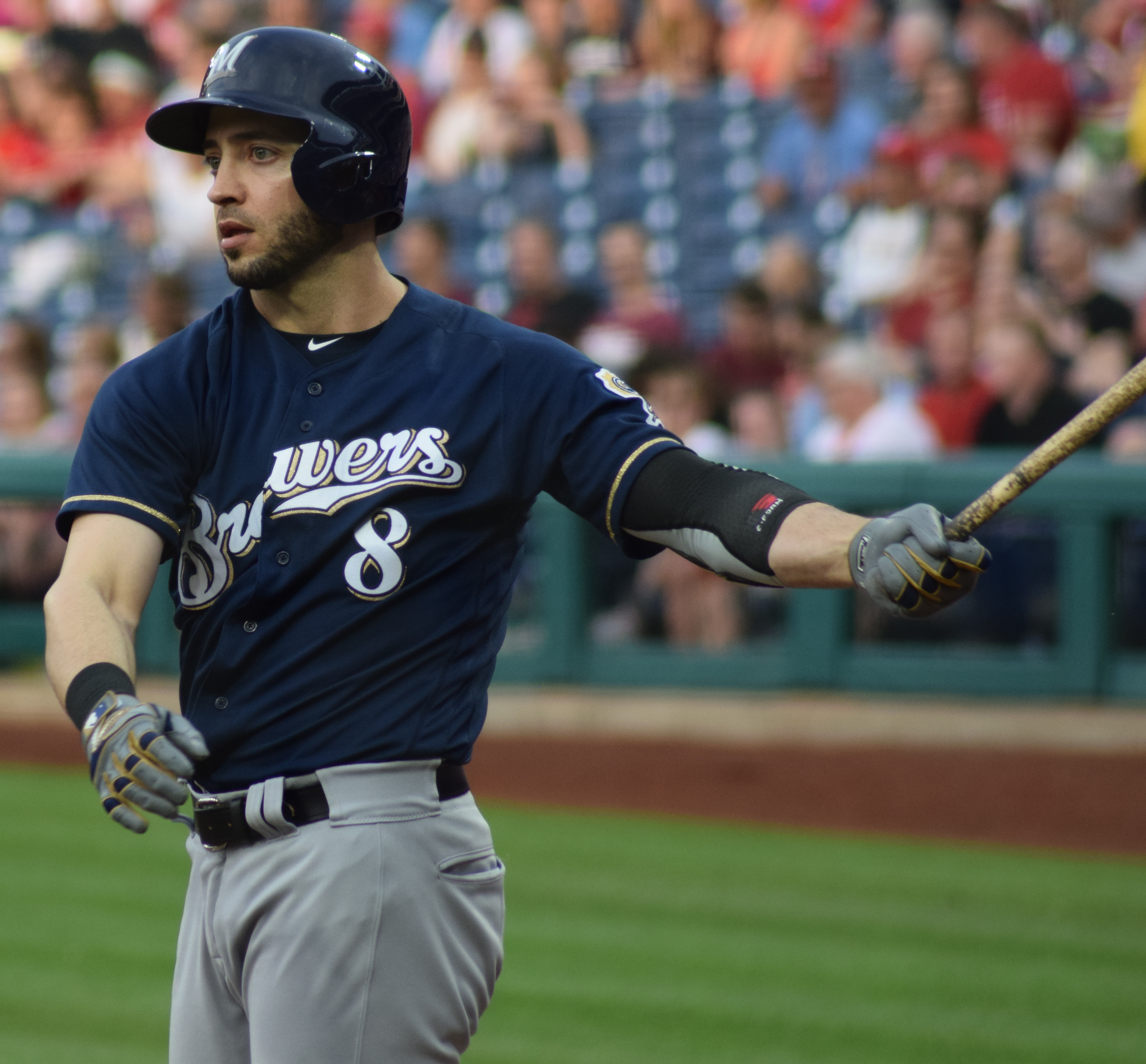
Ryan Braun made over 7,300 plate appearances from 2007 to 2020 and won the NL Rookie of the Year Award (2007) and NL MVP Award (2011).

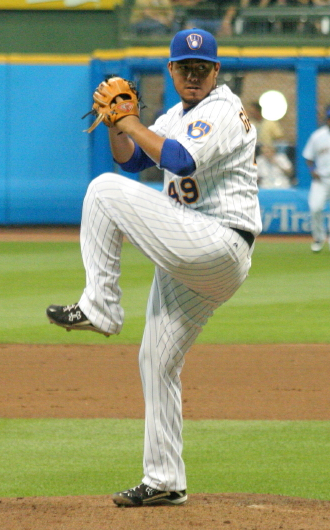
Yovani Gallardo pitched nearly 1,300 innings from 2007 to 2014.

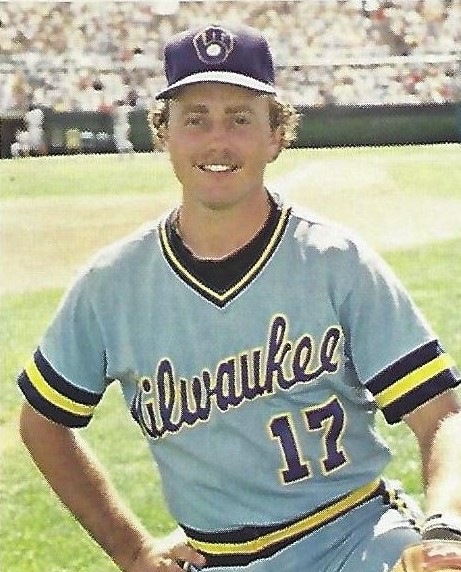
Jim Gantner made almost 6,800 plate appearances from 1976 to 1992.

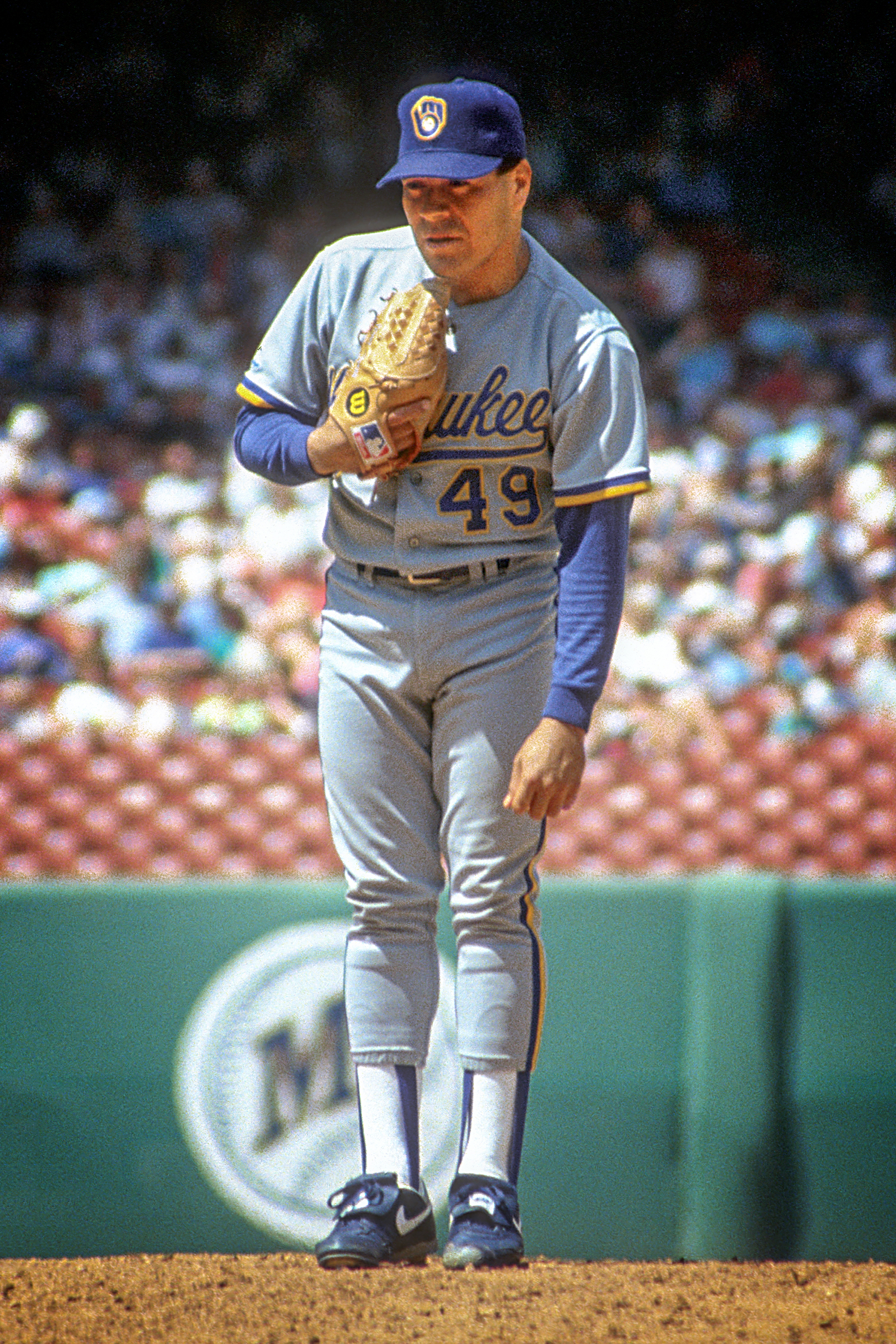
Teddy Higuera pitched nearly 1,400 innings from 1985 to 1991 and 1993 to 1994.

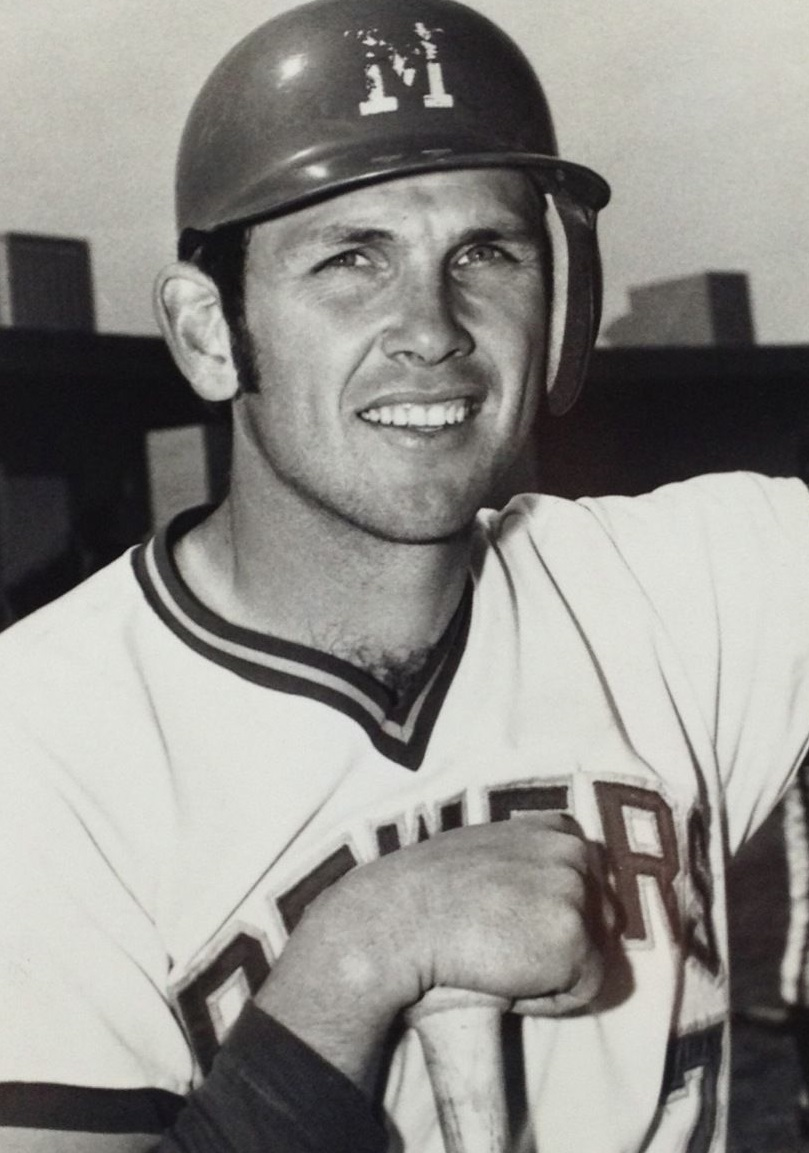
Don Money made almost 5,000 plate appearances from 1973 to 1983.

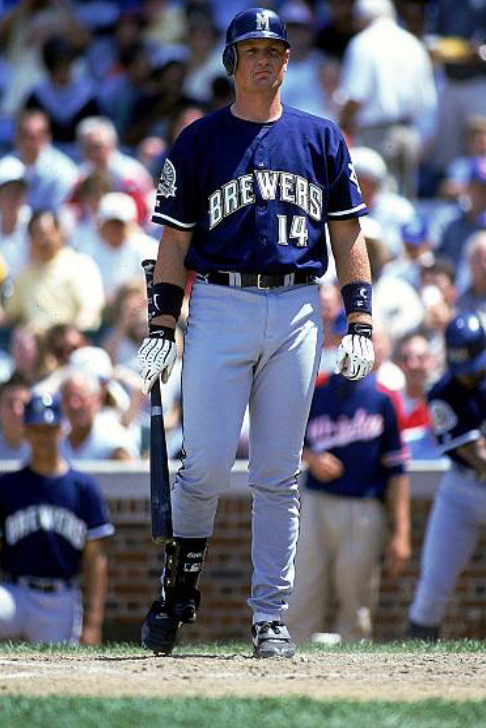
David Nilsson made over 3,100 plate appearances from 1992 to 1999.

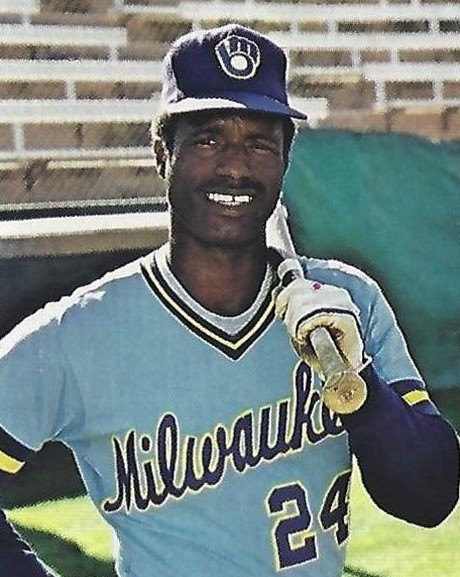
Ben Oglivie made over 4,600 plate appearances from 1978 to 1986.

Key
Position(s)	Indicates the inductee's primary position or role
†	Member of the National Baseball Hall of Fame
‡	Recipient of the Hall of Fame's Ford C. Frick Award
PA	2,000 or more plate appearances
IP	1,000 or more innings pitched
GP	250 or more games pitched
MVP	Most Valuable Player Award winner
CY	Cy Young Award winner
ROY	Rookie of the Year Award winner
REL	Reliever of the Year Award winner
PEN	Manager of a pennant-winning team
STAT	Statue on American Family Field Plaza
HOF	Elected to the National Baseball Hall of Fame
BCAST	Primary broadcaster for 20 or more seasons after playing career
GM	General manager for 10 years or more and reached the postseason

Wall of Honor inductees
Inducted	Name	Position(s)	Career	Criteria met	Refs.
2014	Hank Aaron^{†}	Designated hitter	1975–1976	STAT, HOF	
2025	John Axford	Pitcher	2009–2013, 2021	GP, REL	
2014	Jerry Augustine	Pitcher	1975–1984	GP	
2014	Sal Bando	Third baseman	1977–1981	PA	
2014	Chris Bosio	Pitcher	1986–1992	IP	
2022	Ryan Braun	Left fielder	2007–2020	PA, MVP, ROY	
2014	Johnny Briggs	Left fielder	1971–1975	PA	
2014	Jeromy Burnitz	Right fielder	1996–2001	PA	
2014	Mike Caldwell	Pitcher	1977–1984	IP	
2014	Bill Castro	Pitcher	1974–1980	GP	
2014	Jeff Cirillo	Third baseman	1994–1999, 2005–2006	PA	
2014	Jim Colborn	Pitcher	1972–1976	IP	
2014	Cecil Cooper	First baseman	1977–1987	PA	
2014	Craig Counsell	Second baseman	2004, 2007–2011	PA	
2014	Chuck Crim	Pitcher	1987–1991	GP	
2018	Harry Dalton	General manager	1977–1991	GM	
2014	Rob Deer	Right fielder	1986–1990	PA	
2014	Cal Eldred	Pitcher	1991–1999	IP	
2014	Mike Fetters	Pitcher	1992–1997	GP	
2018	Prince Fielder	First baseman	2005–2011	PA	
2014	Rollie Fingers^{†}	Pitcher	1981–1982, 1984–1985	MVP, CY, HOF	
2021	Yovani Gallardo	Pitcher	2007–2014	IP	
2014	Jim Gantner	Second baseman	1976–1992	PA	
2021	Carlos Gómez	Center fielder	2010–2015	PA	
2014	Moose Haas	Pitcher	1976–1985	IP, GP	
2014	Bill Hall	Third baseman	2002–2009	PA	
2014	Darryl Hamilton	Center fielder	1988, 1990–1995	PA	
2019	J. J. Hardy	Shortstop	2005–2009	PA	
2017	Corey Hart	Right fielder	2004–2012	PA	
2014	Teddy Higuera	Pitcher	1985–1991, 1993–1994	IP	
2019	Trevor Hoffman^{†}	Pitcher	2009–2010	HOF	
2014	John Jaha	First baseman	1992–1998	PA	
2014	Geoff Jenkins	Left fielder	1998–2007	PA	
2014	Harvey Kuenn	Manager	1975, 1982–1983	PEN	
2014	Sixto Lezcano	Right fielder	1974–1980	PA	
2014	Pat Listach	Shortstop	1992–1996	ROY	
2014	Mark Loretta	Shortstop	1995–2002	PA	
2022	Jonathan Lucroy	Catcher	2010–2016	PA	
2014	Dave May	Center fielder	1970–1974, 1978	PA	
2014	Bob McClure	Pitcher	1977–1986	GP	
2018	Doug Melvin	General manager	2002–2015	GM	
2014	Paul Molitor^{†}	Third baseman	1978–1992	PA, HOF	
2014	Don Money	Third baseman	1973–1983	PA	
2014	Charlie Moore	Catcher	1973–1986	PA	
2014	Jaime Navarro	Pitcher	1989–1994, 2000	IP	
2014	Dave Nilsson	Catcher	1992–1999	PA	
2014	Ben Oglivie	Left fielder	1978–1986	PA	
2026	Dave Parker^{†}	Designated hitter	1990	HOF	
2014	Dan Plesac	Pitcher	1986–1992	GP	
2014	Darrell Porter	Catcher	1971–1976	PA	
2021	Francisco Rodríguez	Pitcher	2011–2015	GP	
2026	CC Sabathia^{†}	Pitcher	2008	HOF	
2014	Ken Sanders	Pitcher	1970–1972	REL	
2015	Bill Schroeder	Catcher / broadcaster	1983–1988, 1994–present	BCAST	
2014	George Scott	First baseman	1972–1976	PA	
2014	Kevin Seitzer	Third baseman	1992–1996	PA	
2014	Bud Selig^{†}	Owner	1970–1998	STAT, HOF	
2014	Richie Sexson	First baseman	2000–2003	PA	
2014	Ben Sheets	Pitcher	2001–2008	IP	
2014	Ted Simmons^{†}	Catcher	1981–1985	PA, HOF	
2014	Jim Slaton	Pitcher	1971–1977, 1979–1983	IP, GP	
2014	B. J. Surhoff	Catcher	1987–1995	PA	
2014	Don Sutton^{†}	Pitcher	1982–1984	HOF	
2014	Gorman Thomas	Center fielder	1973–1976, 1978–1983, 1986	PA	
2014	Bill Travers	Pitcher	1974–1980	IP	
2014	Bob Uecker^{‡}	Broadcaster	1971–2024	BCAST, STAT	
2014	José Valentín	Shortstop	1992–1999	PA	
2014	Greg Vaughn	Left fielder	1989–1996	PA	
2014	Fernando Viña	Second baseman	1995–1999	PA	
2014	Pete Vuckovich	Pitcher	1981–1983, 1985–1986	CYA	
2019	Rickie Weeks	Second baseman	2003, 2005–2014	PA	
2014	Bill Wegman	Pitcher	1985–1995	IP, GP	
2014	Bob Wickman	Pitcher	1996–2000	GP	
2014	Robin Yount^{†}	Shortstop	1974–1993	PA, MVP, STAT, HOF	

== Players having met induction criteria ==
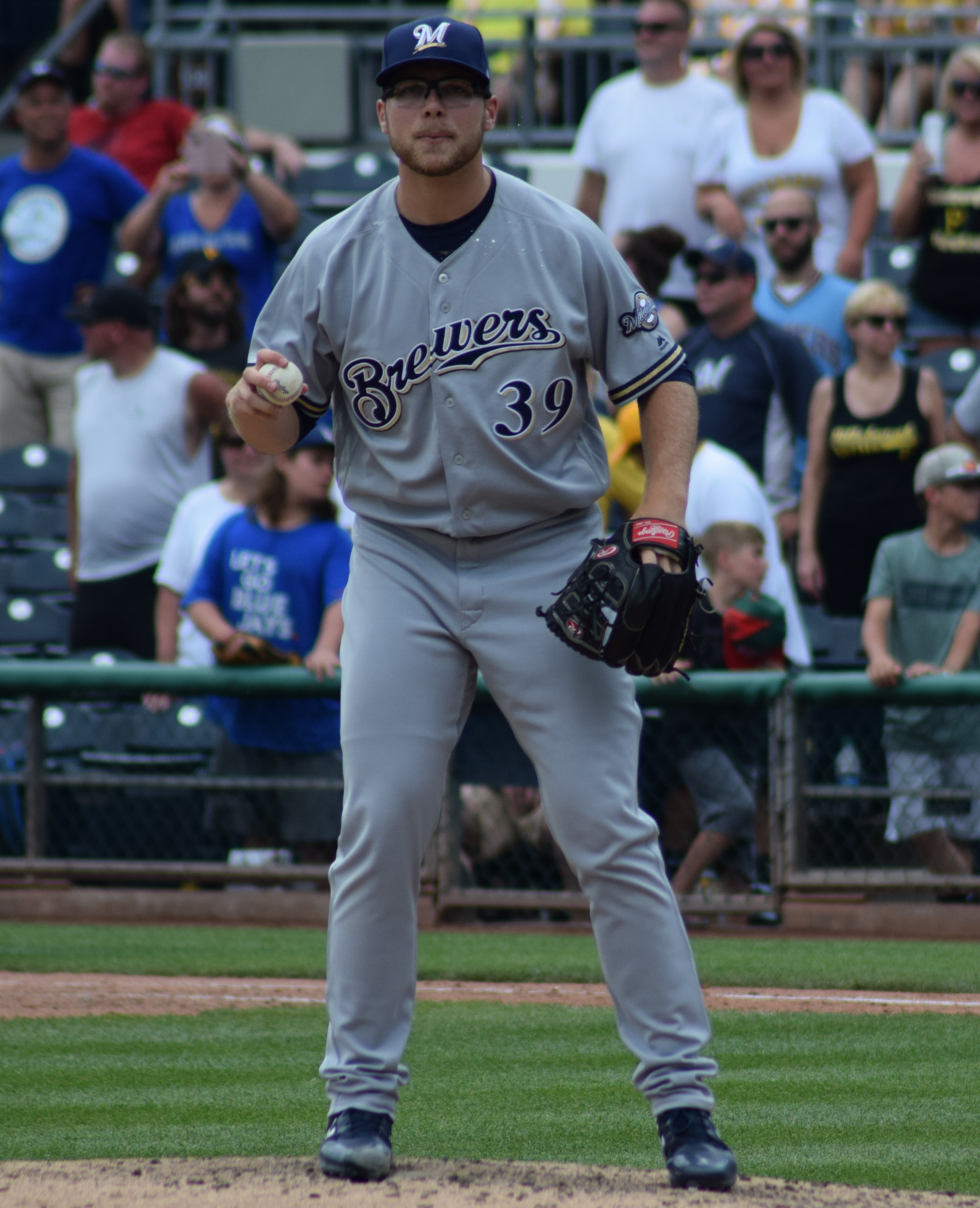
Corbin Burnes won the NL Cy Young Award in 2021.

In addition to those inducted in the Wall of Honor, nine players and one manager meet the requirements for future induction.

Name	Position(s)	Career	Criteria met	Refs.
Willy Adames	Shortstop	2021–2024	PA	
Corbin Burnes	Pitcher	2018–2023	CY	
Josh Hader	Pitcher	2017–2022	REL, GP	
Jeremy Jeffress	Pitcher	2010, 2014–2019	GP	
Devin Williams	Pitcher	2019–2024	ROY, REL	
Christian Yelich	Left fielder	2018–present	MVP, PA	
William Contreras	Catcher	2023–present	PA	
Brice Turang	Second Baseman	2023–present	PA	
Pat Murphy	Manager	2024–present	PEN	
Jacob Misiorowski	Pitcher	2025–present	CY	

== See also ==
- Milwaukee Braves Wall of Honor
