= Dave Stapleton (pitcher) =

American baseball player (born 1961)

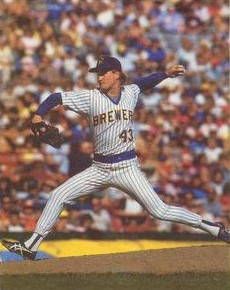
- Pitcher
- Born: October 16, 1961 (age 64); Miami, Arizona, U.S.
- Batted: Left Threw: Left

MLB debut
- September 14, 1987, for the Milwaukee Brewers

Last MLB appearance
- May 10, 1988, for the Milwaukee Brewers

MLB statistics
- Win–loss record: 2–0
- Earned run average: 3.81
- Strikeouts: 20
- Stats at Baseball Reference

Teams
- Milwaukee Brewers (1987–1988)

David Earl Stapleton (born October 16, 1961) is an American former professional baseball pitcher whose career spanned six seasons, two of which were spent in Major League Baseball (MLB) with the Milwaukee Brewers (1987–88). The majority of Stapleton's career was spent in the minor leagues. His career began in 1984 with the Class-A Beloit Brewers of the Midwest League. During his minor league career, Stapleton compiled a 30–26 record with a 3.43 earned run average (ERA) in 444 innings pitched. Over his two years in the majors, he compiled a 2–0 record with a 3.81 ERA and 20 strikeouts in 28 1/3 innings pitched. Stapleton batted and threw left-handed. During his professional career, he was listed at a height of 6 feet 1 inch (185 cm) and a weight of 185 pounds (84 kg).

== Early life ==
Stapleton was born in Miami, Arizona on October 16, 1961. He attended Grand Canyon University from 1982 to 1983. He posted a 16–5 record with a 3.28 earned run average (ERA) in his two years on the school's baseball team, who won the National Association of Intercollegiate Athletics Championship in 1982. As a member of the school's 1982 baseball team, Stapleton is enshrined in Grand Canyon University's athletic hall of fame.

== Playing career ==
In 1983, Stapleton was signed by the Milwaukee Brewers as an amateur free agent. He began his professional career in 1984 in Milwaukee's minor league organization. With the Class-A Beloit Brewers that season, he went 9–6 with a 2.33 ERA in 48 games, all in relief. Milwaukee assigned Stapleton to the Stockton Ports of the Class-A California League in 1985.

A few months into the 1985 season, after losing his closer job to Jeff Parrett, he and his wife, Patty, told manager Tom Gamboa he wanted to quit baseball and become a chimney sweep. Gamboa encouraged him to keep pitching and he finished the season with a 2.54 ERA in 52 relief appearances. Stapleton was promoted to the Double-A level in 1986. With the El Paso Diablos of the Texas League that year, he compiled a 6–2 record with a 3.15 ERA in 38 relief appearances.

Stapleton started the 1987 season with the Double-A El Paso Diablos, where in four games he compiled a 1.74 ERA. He was soon promoted to the Triple-A Denver Bears. Stapleton went 11–3 with a 4.05 ERA, five saves and 74 strikeouts in 44 games, nine of which were starts. Of his nine starts, Stapleton went for a complete game in four and pitched a shutout in one. During the month of August with the Bears, Stapleton went a perfect 6–0. He was called up to the Milwaukee Brewers on September 14, 1987. He made his Major League Baseball debut that day, earning a win in 3 1/3 innings pitched against the New York Yankees. Stapleton finished the 1987 season with Milwaukee going 2–0 with a 1.84 ERA and 14 strikeouts in four games, all in relief.

In January 1988, Stapleton re-signed with the Milwaukee Brewers. That year, he started the season in the major leagues. He made his season debut that year against the Boston Red Sox, pitching 1 2/3 innings, giving-up no runs on two hits. After just six games with the Brewers, Stapleton suffered a shoulder injury, which ended his season. In those games, he compiled no wins or losses with a 5.93 ERA and six strikeouts. Stapleton was removed from the Brewers 40-man roster after undergoing surgery on his injured shoulder. After the season, the Houston Astros selected him in the Rule 5 draft.

In 1989, Stapleton played with the Houston Astros during spring training. Before the start of the regular season, the Astros returned Stapleton to the Milwaukee Brewers. After pitching in extended spring training, the Brewers assigned Stapleton to the Triple-A Denver Bears. He spent the entire season with Denver, going 2–6 with a 5.10 ERA, one save and 46 strikeouts in 34 games, 10 of which were starts.

== Coaching career ==
In 2001, Stapleton was hired as the head baseball coach of his alma mater, Grand Canyon University. In 2002, he led the team to a 38–21 record. The school's softball complex, Stapleton-Pierson Stadium, was previously named after him before being rebuilt and renamed in 2017. On March 10, 2011, Stapleton was dismissed. From February 2014 through 2024, Dave has worked in the California Angels as minor league coach and in player development.

== Personal ==
Stapleton resides in Chandler, Arizona with his wife, Patti and their children; Kadi and Dakota.
