= Jay Aldrich =

American baseball player (born 1961)

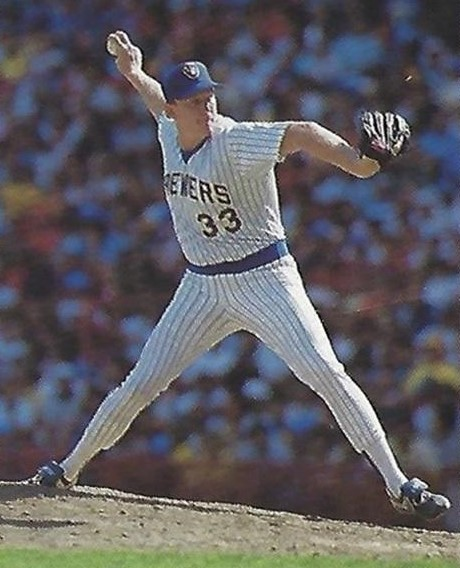
- Pitcher
- Born: April 14, 1961 (age 65); Alexandria, Louisiana, U.S.
- Batted: Right Threw: Right

MLB debut
- June 5, 1987, for the Milwaukee Brewers

Last MLB appearance
- April 26, 1990, for the Baltimore Orioles

MLB statistics
- Win–loss record: 6–5
- Earned run average: 4.72
- Strikeouts: 46
- Stats at Baseball Reference

Teams
- Milwaukee Brewers (1987, 1989); Atlanta Braves (1989); Baltimore Orioles (1990)

Jay Robert Aldrich (born April 14, 1961) is an American former Major League Baseball player who pitched for the Milwaukee Brewers, Atlanta Braves and the Baltimore Orioles.

Aldrich attended Montclair State University, and in 1981 he played collegiate summer baseball with the Chatham A's of the Cape Cod Baseball League. He was selected by the Brewers in the 10th round of the 1982 MLB draft. In 1995, Aldrich signed on as a replacement player for the Pittsburgh Pirates before the resolution of the player's strike.
