= Billy Jo Robidoux =

American baseball player (born 1964)

- First baseman
- Born: January 13, 1964 (age 62); Ware, Massachusetts, U.S.
- Batted: Left Threw: Right

MLB debut
- September 11, 1985, for the Milwaukee Brewers

Last MLB appearance
- September 17, 1990, for the Boston Red Sox

MLB statistics
- Batting average: .209
- Home runs: 5
- Runs batted in: 43
- Stats at Baseball Reference

Teams
- Milwaukee Brewers (1985–1988); Chicago White Sox (1989); Boston Red Sox (1990)

William Joseph Robidoux (/ˈroʊbɪdoʊ/ ROH-bih-doh; born January 13, 1964) is an American former professional baseball player, primarily at first base, but also occasionally played in the outfield and as a designated hitter.

== Career ==
Drafted by the Milwaukee Brewers in the sixth round of the 1982 Major League Baseball draft. Robidoux would make his Major League Baseball debut with the Brewers on September 11, 1985, playing with them until 1988, then signing as a free agent for the 1989 season with the Chicago White Sox. After one season with the White Sox, he signed with the Boston Red Sox for the 1990 season. He appeared in his final game on September 17, 1990.

Robidoux now umpires high school baseball and basketball games in Western Massachusetts.
