= Charlie Leibrandt =

American baseball player (born 1956)

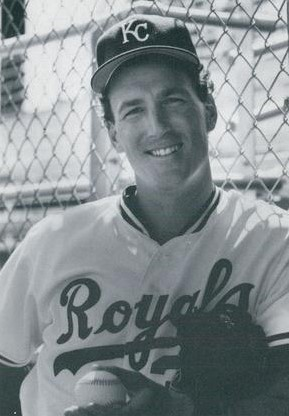
- Pitcher
- Born: October 4, 1956 (age 69); Chicago, Illinois, U.S.
- Batted: Right Threw: Left

MLB debut
- September 17, 1979, for the Cincinnati Reds

Last MLB appearance
- September 21, 1993, for the Texas Rangers

MLB statistics
- Win–loss record: 140–119
- Earned run average: 3.71
- Strikeouts: 1,121
- Stats at Baseball Reference

Teams
- Cincinnati Reds (1979–1982); Kansas City Royals (1984–1989); Atlanta Braves (1990–1992); Texas Rangers (1993)

Career highlights and awards
- World Series champion (1985)

Charles Louis Leibrandt Jr. (/ˈliːbrænt/; born October 4, 1956) is an American former Major League Baseball pitcher who played from 1979 to 1993 for the Cincinnati Reds, Kansas City Royals, Atlanta Braves, and Texas Rangers. Leibrandt was a member of the 1985 World Series champion Royals team.

== Early years and education ==
Leibrandt was born in Chicago, Illinois. He grew up in Golf, Illinois and his parents, Anne and Chuck, ran a restaurant in the bordering village of Morton Grove. He attended Chicago Cubs games at Wrigley Field as a youth and dreamt of pitching for the Cubs. He attended Loyola Academy.

He attended Miami University, in Oxford, Ohio, from 1975–1978, where he earned four letters as a pitcher on the baseball team. During his senior year, Leibrandt was selected first-team All-MAC; he compiled a record of 7–2 with an ERA of 1.65.

== Career ==
Leibrandt was drafted by the Cincinnati Reds in the ninth round of the 1978 free agent draft. He made his debut in Major League Baseball on September 17, 1979, in a Cincinnati Reds uniform. A few weeks later, he made his first post-season appearance in the 1979 National League Championship Series, recording an out of the only batter he faced, John Milner.

In 1980, Leibrandt made his first major league start in the 4th game of the season as the Reds beat the Atlanta Braves, 5–0, and Leibrandt threw a five-hit shutout for his first career win. But Leibrandt, while 10–9 in 1980, showed little promise in Cincinnati and was traded to the Kansas City Royals for Bob Tufts on June 7, 1983. The following year, Leibrandt went 11–7 with a 3.63 ERA as the Royals won the Western Division championship.

In 1985, Leibrandt had the best year of his career, going 17–9 with a 2.69 ERA as the Royals won the World Series. Over the next three years, Leibrandt won 14, 16, and 13 games, but after a disastrous 1989 when he went 5–11 on a second place (but 92-wins) team, the Royals traded Leibrandt and Rick Luecken to the Atlanta Braves for Gerald Perry and Jim Lemasters.

On May 16, 1987, Leibrandt pitched a complete game one-hitter against the Milwaukee Brewers. The only hit for the Brewers was a bunt hit by backup Brewers catcher Bill Schroeder. Schroeder would go on to become the TV color commentator for the Brewers.

On the last place Braves in 1990, Leibrandt went 9–11 with a 3.16 ERA, finishing behind only John Smoltz and Tom Glavine on the Braves staff in wins. The following year, 1991, Leibrandt was a member of one of two trios in MLB history of southpaws ever to win 15 games on the same staff, sharing that honor with Glavine and Steve Avery, also has been done by the 1997 Mariners since. Leibrandt was generally regarded as a fourth starter on the Braves in 1991 and 1992. On September 29, 1992, Leibrandt recorded the 1,000th strikeout of his career against the San Francisco Giants. In the same game, the Braves clinched the National League West title for the second straight year.

On December 9, 1992, Leibrandt was traded to the Texas Rangers along with Pat Gomez for everyday utility player Jose Oliva.

In 1993, despite six straight road wins (which no subsequent Texas Rangers pitcher matched until 2009, when it was surpassed by Scott Feldman), he ended with a season record of 9–10 record with a 4.55 ERA, and subsequently retired.

=== Post-season ===
==== Kansas City Royals ====
For all of his successes as a pitcher, Leibrandt is best known for a series of post-season hard luck, pitching well in losing efforts. In 1984, Leibrandt and the Royals faced elimination in the best-of-five American League Championship Series against the Detroit Tigers. Leibrandt threw a complete game three-hitter only to lose, 1–0, on a fielder's choice in the second inning.

In the following year's ALCS, the Toronto Blue Jays beat Leibrandt badly in Game 1 but he turned in an effective pitching performance in Game 4. However, he lost when, leading 1–0 in the ninth, he walked Dámaso García, who scored on Lloyd Moseby's double. Responsible for Moseby, Leibrandt watched as the Blue Jays scored twice off reliever Dan Quisenberry and got tagged with the loss. He redeemed himself, however, coming out of the bullpen to replace the injured Bret Saberhagen in Game 7 and picking up the win that sent the Royals to the World Series.

In the World Series against the St. Louis Cardinals, Leibrandt again pitched masterfully for eight innings and entered the ninth inning of Game 2 leading a two-hitter, 2–0. It all fell apart again for Leibrandt, though, as Willie McGee doubled to right. With two outs and McGee on second, three Cardinal hits, the last by future Braves teammate Terry Pendleton, scored four runs and saddled Leibrandt with another loss. Five nights later in Game 6, Leibrandt left in the eighth inning trailing 1–0 despite only allowing four hits. However, the Royals rallied and won the game 2–1 on a one-out bases-loaded bloop single by pinch-hitter Dane Iorg. In Game 7 the following night, Kansas City blew the Cardinals out, 11–0, to win their first of two World Series titles.

==== Atlanta Braves ====
In 1991, Braves manager Bobby Cox designated Leibrandt the starter for Game 1 of the World Series against the Minnesota Twins. Leibrandt got the start by virtue of his long post-season rest and the fact he was the only Braves starter who had ever pitched in the Metrodome. Leibrandt lost as he pitched decently but was outpitched by Jack Morris. Leibrandt is best known for surrendering a walk-off home run to future Baseball Hall of Famer Kirby Puckett in Game 6 of that series. The first pitch of the inning was a change-up, which Puckett took for strike one. The next one was a similar high and outside fastball, which Puckett took for ball one; pitch three was another fastball for ball two. The fourth pitch, and last pitch of the game, was a weak, high change-up that failed to break. Puckett made solid contact and sprinted for first, as was his usual practice. Only after he saw first base coach Wayne Terwilliger throw up his hands in victory did Puckett realize he had hit a home run. Leibrandt was called upon to enter the game in a highly unfamiliar role – as a reliever late in the extra-inning game, and very late at night. Cox endured some criticism for the move because the Braves still had several relievers at their disposal including left-hander Kent Mercker and right-handers Jim Clancy and Mark Wohlers.

Leibrandt played in the World Series with the Braves the following year. The Braves lost that series also, this time to the Toronto Blue Jays in six games. In the final game, in circumstances similar to Game 6 of the prior year's Series, Leibrandt was called in as a reliever in an extra-inning game. Just as in 1991, Cox was criticized for using Leibrandt as a reliever with closer Jeff Reardon and relievers Marvin Freeman and David Nied still available. Toronto rallied for two runs in the top of the 11th on a hit by Dave Winfield. The Braves got one run back in the bottom of the 11th; however, it was not enough and Leibrandt ended up as the losing pitcher.

== Personal life ==
Leibrandt and his wife, Corrine, have four children—a daughter and three sons. He and his family continued to make their home in the Atlanta area after his retirement, and he coached his sons’ high school baseball teams at Marist School. The youngest son, Brandon, has played in Major League Baseball for the Miami Marlins and Cincinnati Reds. His middle son, Brodie, was a starter at Columbus State University, in Columbus, Georgia. Leibrandt's oldest son, Ryan, is a physician in New York City.
