= Bryan Clutterbuck =

American baseball player (1959-2016)

- Pitcher
- Born: December 17, 1959; Detroit, Michigan, U.S.
- Died: August 23, 2016 (aged 56); Milford, Michigan, U.S.
- Batted: Right Threw: Right

MLB debut
- July 18, 1986, for the Milwaukee Brewers

Last MLB appearance
- June 23, 1989, for the Milwaukee Brewers

MLB statistics
- Win–loss record: 2–6
- Earned run average: 4.21
- Strikeouts: 67
- Stats at Baseball Reference

Teams
- Milwaukee Brewers (1986, 1989)

Bryan Richard Clutterbuck (December 17, 1959 – August 23, 2016) was an American professional baseball player. A right-handed pitcher, he appeared in 34 games in Major League Baseball for the Milwaukee Brewers during the 1986 and 1989 seasons. The native of Milford, Michigan, was listed as 6 feet 4 inches (1.93 m) tall and 223 pounds (101 kg).

== Career ==
Clutterbuck played college baseball at Eastern Michigan University for coach Ron Oestrike. He was selected by Milwaukee in the seventh round of the 1981 Major League Baseball draft, and pitched in the Brewer farm system for nine years (1981–1989). His first MLB trial came during July, August and September 1986. He worked in 20 games in relief, lost his only decision, and posted a 4.29 earned run average. After returning to the minor leagues for the full years of 1987 and 1988, Clutterbuck began 1989 with the MLB Brewers and made 11 starts in 14 total appearances through June. On April 25, he earned his first big-league win and only complete game when he limited the Minnesota Twins to seven hits and four earned runs in a 10–4 Brewer triumph at Milwaukee County Stadium. Inserted into the Milwaukee starting rotation, he pitched effectively, although lucklessly. By June 4, he had lowered his earned run average to 2.68, but was able to win only one more game, a six-inning outing May 25 against the defending American League champion Oakland Athletics. After his last MLB outing for Milwaukee June 23, he appeared in four games for Double-A El Paso. Then, after spending 1990 through 1993 out of pro baseball, he attempted a comeback in the independent leagues in 1994 and 1995.

Clutterbuck's career statistics include a 2–6 win–loss record, a 4.21 earned run average, and 67 strikeouts in 124 innings pitched. He permitted 141 hits and 32 bases on balls. He died on August 23, 2016, from colon cancer.
