= Pat Hughes (sportscaster) =

American sportscaster (born 1955)

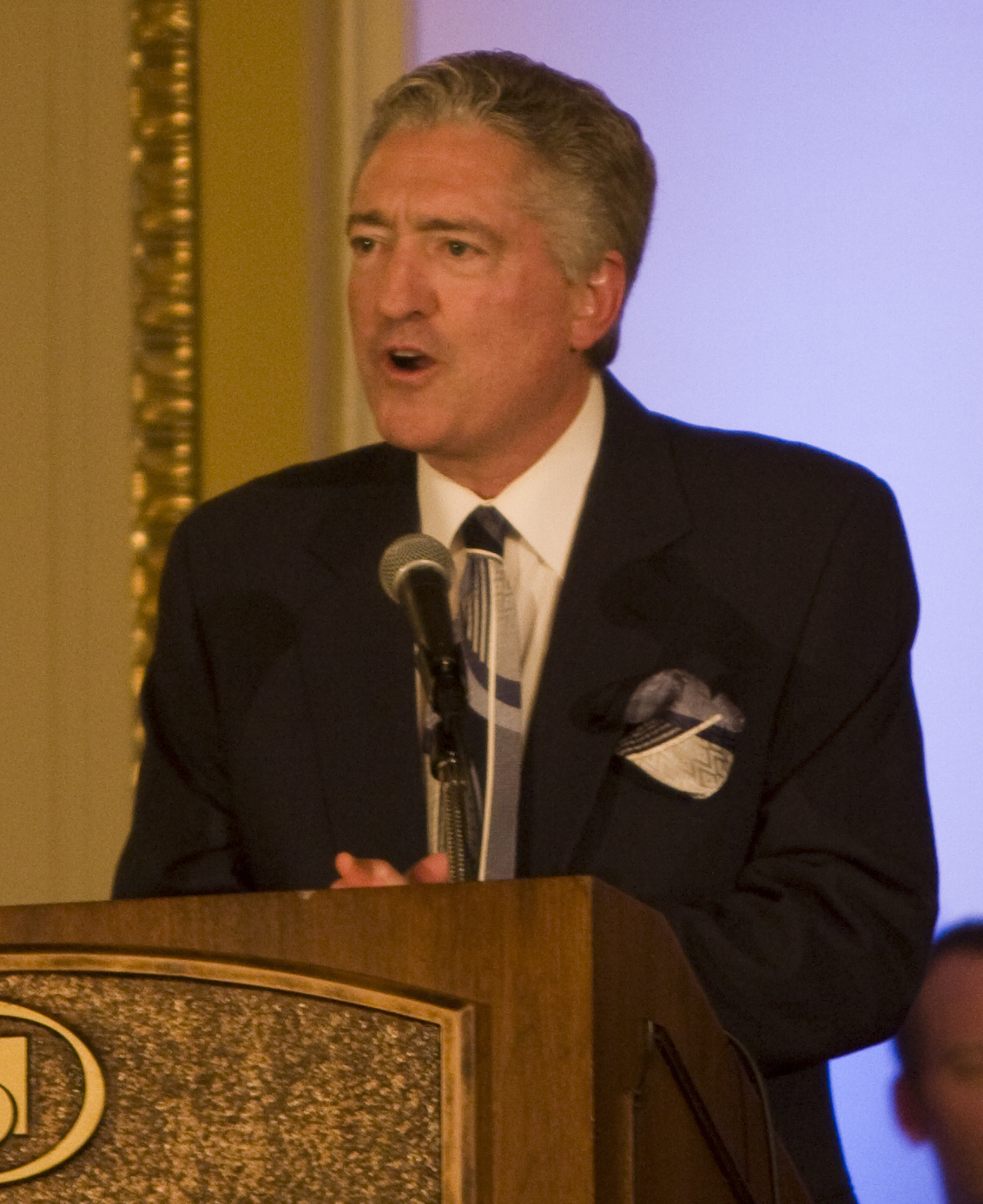
- Hughes at the 2011 Cubs Convention
- Born: Vergil Patrick Hughes; May 27, 1955 (age 71); Tucson, Arizona, U.S.
- Education: San Jose State University
- Occupation: Sportscaster
- Years active: 1978–present
- Employer: WSCR
- Awards: Ford C. Frick Award (2023)

Vergil Patrick Hughes (born May 27, 1955) is an American sportscaster. He has been the radio play-by-play announcer for the Chicago Cubs of Major League Baseball (MLB) since 1996. The 2026 season marked the 44th consecutive year that Hughes served as an MLB announcer.

In recognition of his career, Hughes was awarded the 2023 Ford C. Frick Award.

== Personal life ==
Born in Tucson, Arizona, Pat Hughes grew up in San Jose, California. He graduated from Branham High School in San Jose, California in 1973, and from San Jose State University in 1978 with a degree in Radio/TV Journalism.

Hughes has been married to his wife, Trish, since 1987. They have two daughters, Janell and Amber.

== Broadcasting career ==
Hughes's MLB career began in 1983 performing as a TV play-by-play man for the Minnesota Twins, after which he spent 12 years calling Milwaukee Brewers games. Hughes also called Marquette University men's basketball games for 17 seasons with the inimitable Al McGuire.

In November 1995, Hughes was selected by Chicago's WGN Radio to be the new "Voice of the Cubs." Hughes partnered with color commentator Ron Santo, former third baseman for the Cubs, from 1996 until Santo's death in 2010. Their on-air chemistry came to be known as the "Pat and Ron Show." In September 2003, he served as the MC when the Cubs retired Santo’s number before the final regular season game at Wrigley Field. After Santo's death, Hughes partnered with former Cub Keith Moreland for three seasons. In December, 2013, former Cub and All-Star, Chicago native Ron Coomer became Hughes' new partner. That pair called games on WGN in 2014, switched to WBBM in 2015, and moved to WSCR in 2016. Hughes' storied career has also included partnering with fellow Frick Award broadcasters Harry Caray and Bob Uecker. Pat Hughes filled in as a play by play man for Cubs games on Marquee Sports Network from 2022-2024. In April 2018, Hughes broadcast his 6,000th Major League Baseball game, a total that included Cactus League preseason, MLB regular season, and MLB postseason games. After the 2017 season, Hughes estimated that he had only missed five games for health reasons, despite undergoing three throat surgeries in the preceding years.

His usual home run call is "that ball's got a chaaaance ... GONE!" On longer home runs, Hughes' call often includes the phrase "get out the tape measure, LONG GONE!"

During each Cubs broadcast, Hughes and his broadcast partners play an informal attendance prediction game, with each guessing the night's paid attendance. Hughes has become known among listeners for making palindromic guesses—attendance figures that read the same forward and backward (such as 37,973 or 40,404). On July 8, 2026, while broadcasting a game between the Cubs and the Baltimore Orioles at Camden Yards in Baltimore, Hughes broke from that long-standing tradition by guessing 12,345. When asked about the departure from his usual pattern, Hughes explained that he chose the number because it had never been used before, making it a unique attendance guess while still maintaining a pattern.

Hughes has announced 57 Cubs postseason games, more than any other Cubs broadcaster. He has also called eight no-hitters during his career, including those tossed by Juan Nieves, Scott Erickson, Carlos Zambrano, Cole Hamels, Alec Mills, and two by Jake Arrieta.

In addition to Major League Baseball and Marquette basketball, Hughes has also covered games for the NHL's Minnesota North Stars, Minor League Baseball's Columbus Clippers and San Jose Missions, University of Wisconsin football and basketball, and Northwestern University basketball.

=== Historic calls ===
One of Hughes' best known calls came at the end of the 2016 World Series, when the Cubs ended a 108-year World Series drought, the longest in baseball history:

A little bouncer slowly toward Bryant. He will glove it and throw to Rizzo. It's in time! And the Chicago Cubs win the World Series! The Cubs come pouring out of the dugout, jumping up and down like a bunch of delirious 10-year-olds. The Cubs have done it! The longest drought in the history of American sports is over, and the celebration begins!

He is also known for his call of Mark McGwire's 62nd home run in 1998, which broke the single-season home run record, which is the most often-played call of that moment:

He drives one to deep left—this could be—it's a home run! Number 62 for Mark McGwire! A slice of history and a magical moment in St. Louis!

== Awards and honors ==
Hughes has been awarded several honors in recognition of his career, including repeated acknowledgement from the National Sportscasters and Sportswriters Association with nine Illinois Sportscaster of the Year awards (1996, 1999, 2006, 2007, 2009, 2014, 2015, 2017, 2019), and an additional three Wisconsin Sportscaster of the Year awards (1990–92). In 2016, Hughes received the Ring Lardner Award for Excellence in Sports Journalism, Broadcast category.

In addition to awards, Hughes has been inducted into the Hall of Fame of several organizations. In 2012, he was inducted into the Branham High School Athletic Hall of Fame. The broadcaster was inducted into the WGN Radio Walk of Fame in 2014, only the 3rd sportscaster to be honored. In 2017, Hughes was inducted into the Irish/American Baseball Hall of Fame in New York City.

On August 24, 2022, it was announced during a broadcast of the Cubs versus St. Louis that Hughes would be inducted into the Chicago Cubs Hall of Fame, with his plaque to be unveiled on September 10.

=== Frick Award ===
In 2016, Hughes was a finalist for the Ford C. Frick Award, in conjunction with the Baseball Hall of Fame in Cooperstown, New York. In 2022, he was again a finalist and was announced as the recipient in December, linking him with past fellow Cubs recipients Harry Caray and Jack Brickhouse.

== Baseball Voices ==
Pat Hughes is the sole proprietor of "Baseball Voices," commemorative audio tributes to MLB's greatest announcers. On each CD, Pat performs as Producer, Writer, and Narrator. Featured broadcasters include Hughes' former colleagues Harry Caray, Ron Santo and Bob Uecker, as well as Hall of Famers Mel Allen, Red Barber, Marty Brennaman, Jack Buck, Milo Hamilton, Harry Kalas, Denny Matthews, Dave Niehaus, Bob Prince, Chuck Thompson, Russ Hodges and Lon Simmons. After the Cubs 2016 Championship, a Special Edition of Baseball Voices was created entitled "The Chicago Cubs Win the World Series!"

Preceded by Thom Brennaman	Chicago Cubs Radio Play-By-Play Announcer; 1996–present	Incumbent
