= Teddy Higuera =

Mexican baseball player (born 1957)

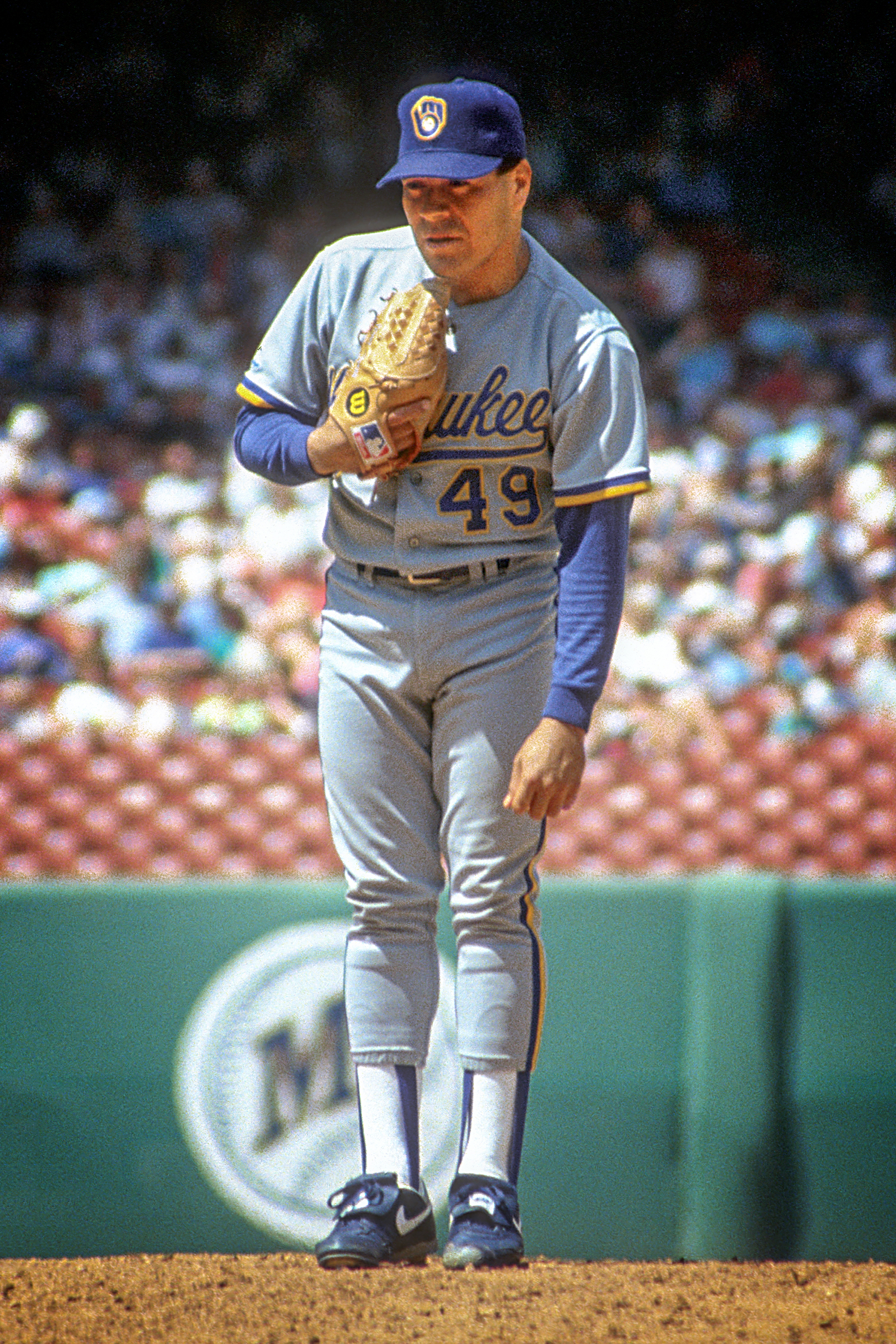
- Higuera in 1991
- Pitcher
- Born: November 9, 1957 (age 68); Los Mochis, Sinaloa, Mexico
- Batted: Both Threw: Left

MLB debut
- April 23, 1985, for the Milwaukee Brewers

Last MLB appearance
- August 9, 1994, for the Milwaukee Brewers

MLB statistics
- Win–loss record: 94–64
- Earned run average: 3.61
- Strikeouts: 1,081
- Stats at Baseball Reference

Teams
- Milwaukee Brewers (1985–1991, 1993–1994)

Career highlights and awards
- All-Star (1986); Milwaukee Brewers Wall of Honor; American Family Field Walk of Fame

Member of the Mexican Professional

Baseball Hall of Fame
- Induction: 2011

Teodoro Higuera Valenzuela (born November 9, 1957) is a Mexican former professional baseball pitcher. He played Major League Baseball (MLB) for nine seasons, all with the Milwaukee Brewers. He is one of only four players with 1,000 strikeouts in franchise history.

== Early career ==
Higuera was named the rookie of the year with the Indios de Ciudad Juárez during the 1981 Mexican League season. In 1983, his contract was purchased by the Brewers. After one year in the minor leagues, Higuera earned a spot in the team's 1985 rotation after winning a competition with Japanese pitcher Yutaka Enatsu. In his first season with Milwaukee, he posted a 15–8 record with a 3.90 ERA en route to winning The Sporting News Rookie of the Year Award in 1985.

1986 was one of Higuera's best seasons. He had his only 20-win season, going 20–11 with 207 strikeouts and a 2.79 ERA. It was the first 20-win season by a Mexican-born pitcher in the American League. That season, he was also selected for his only All-Star Game appearance. In the game, Fernando Valenzuela struck Higuera out in the fifth inning to tie Carl Hubbell's All-Star record with five consecutive strikeouts.

He followed up his 1986 campaign by winning 18 games in 1987 and setting team marks for strikeouts (240) and consecutive scoreless innings (32).

Over his first four years in the league, Higuera had a won loss record of 69–38, 766 strikeouts and a 3.25 ERA and was poised for greater success. However, he began to suffer injury problems that would limit his playing time.

== Injuries and retirement ==
Back surgery and sprained ankles limited Higuera to 22 starts in 1989, although he came back to go 9–6. He was healthy for most of 1990 but had a record of 11–10 with 129 strikeouts. Nevertheless, the Brewers were convinced that he could return to form and signed him to a four-year, $13.1 million contract.

Higuera tore his rotator cuff in 1991 and endured several surgeries. He missed the entire 1992 season and saw limited action in 1993 and 1994. The Brewers did not offer him a contract in 1995 and Higuera attempted a comeback with the San Diego Padres. He did not make the team and retired that season.

== Post-retirement ==
Higuera has served as a pitching coach for his native Mexico in the 2006, 2009, and 2013 World Baseball Classic. In 2011, Higuera was inducted into the Mexican Professional Baseball Hall of Fame.
