= Bill Wegman =

American baseball player (born 1962)

- Pitcher
- Born: December 19, 1962 (age 63); Cincinnati, Ohio, U.S.
- Batted: Right Threw: Right

MLB debut
- September 14, 1985, for the Milwaukee Brewers

Last MLB appearance
- October 1, 1995, for the Milwaukee Brewers

MLB statistics
- Win–loss record: 81–90
- Earned run average: 4.16
- Strikeouts: 696
- Stats at Baseball Reference

Teams
- Milwaukee Brewers (1985–1995)

Career highlights and awards
- Milwaukee Brewers Wall of Honor

William Edward Wegman (born December 19, 1962) is an American former professional baseball pitcher. He played his entire Major League Baseball (MLB) career with the Milwaukee Brewers.

After graduating from Oak Hills High School, Wegman was drafted by the Milwaukee Brewers in the 5th round of the 1981 amateur draft. He played for the team throughout his entire 11-year career, ending on October 1, 1995. In 1983, Wegman won the Ray Scarborough Award as the Brewers' Minor League Player of the Year. Wegman won a career-high 15 games in 1991, with a 2.84 earned run average.

== See also ==
- List of Major League Baseball players who spent their entire career with one franchise
