= Chuck Crim =

American baseball player (born 1961)

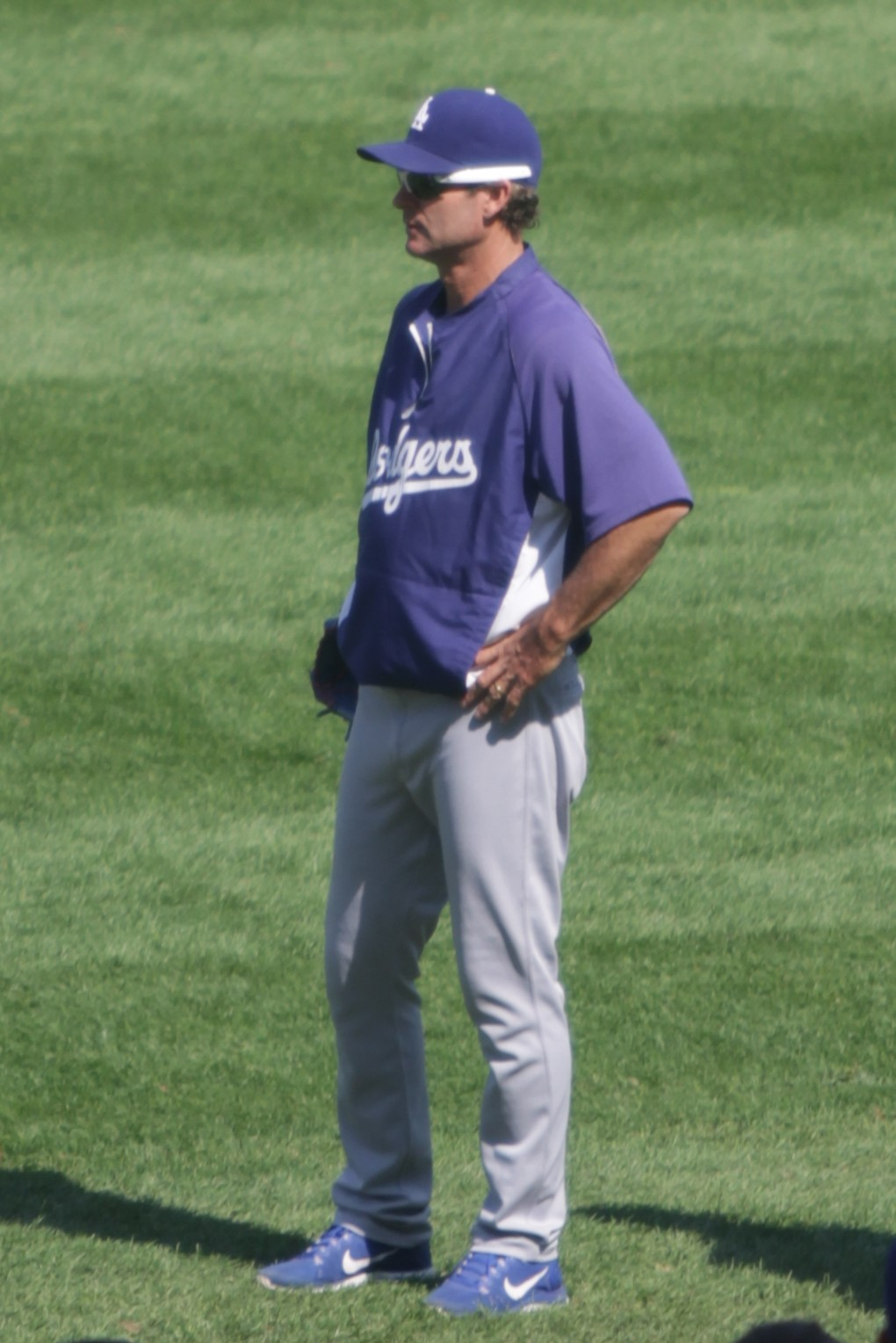
- Crim with the Los Angeles Dodgers
- Pitcher
- Born: July 23, 1961 (age 64); Van Nuys, California, U.S.
- Batted: Right Threw: Right

MLB debut
- April 8, 1987, for the Milwaukee Brewers

Last MLB appearance
- August 8, 1994, for the Chicago Cubs

MLB statistics
- Win–loss record: 47–43
- Earned run average: 3.83
- Strikeouts: 334
- Stats at Baseball Reference

Teams
- Milwaukee Brewers (1987–1991); California Angels (1992–1993); Chicago Cubs (1994)

Career highlights and awards
- Milwaukee Brewers Wall of Honor

Charles Robert Crim (born July 23, 1961) is an American former professional baseball relief pitcher. He played in Major League Baseball (MLB) for the Milwaukee Brewers, California Angels, and Chicago Cubs from 1987 to 1994.

== Career ==
A 1979 graduate of Thousand Oaks High School, Crim went to school at the University of Hawaii at Manoa where he was an All-American pitcher. He was drafted by the Brewers in the 17th round of the 1982 MLB amateur draft. He was a starter in his first two minor league seasons, before becoming a relief pitcher in 1984, finishing second in the Texas League in saves.

Crim played with the Brewers from 1987 to 1991. While with the Brewers, Crim led the American League in games pitched in both 1988 and 1989 and was voted "Top Set-Up Man" by The Sporting News. He was traded to the California Angels on December 10, 1991, for reliever Mike Fetters and a minor-league player. Crim played two seasons with the Angels before being released on May 31, 1993, with a nagging shoulder injury. The Chicago Cubs signed him on January 11, 1994, where he spent a very successful year at Wrigley Field. He retired following the season. Crim was a scout for the Los Angeles Dodgers from 2006 to 2009 then headed back onto the field as a pitching coach in the Dodgers minor league system. In 2009, he was the pitching coach for the Ogden Raptors Rookie Ball team. In 2010, he was the pitching coach for the Great Lakes Loons where his pitching staff led the league as well as finishing with 90 wins, a 2010 minor league season best. In 2011, he became the coach of the Chattanooga Lookouts. On November 13, 2012, Crim was promoted to be the Dodgers bullpen coach, a position he held through the 2015 season.

== Sources ==
- Career statistics from Baseball Reference · Baseball Reference (Minors) · Retrosheet · Baseball Almanac

| Preceded by Ken Howell | Los Angeles Dodgers bullpen coach 2013–2015 | Succeeded by Josh Bard |
