= Mike Birkbeck =

American baseball player (born 1961)

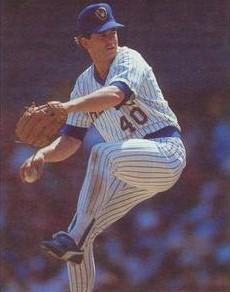

Kent State Golden Flashes
- Pitcher / Coach
- Born: March 10, 1961 (age 65); Orrville, Ohio, U.S.
- Batted: Right Threw: Right

Professional debut
- MLB: August 17, 1986, for the Milwaukee Brewers
- NPB: July 2, 1995, for the Yokohama BayStars

Last appearance
- MLB: June 11, 1995, for the New York Mets
- NPB: July 16, 1996, for the Yokohama BayStars

MLB statistics
- Win–loss record: 12–19
- Earned run average: 4.86
- Strikeouts: 149

NPB statistics
- Win–loss record: 2–2
- Earned run average: 4.78
- Strikeouts: 27
- Stats at Baseball Reference

Teams
- Milwaukee Brewers (1986–1989); New York Mets (1992, 1995); Yokohama BayStars (1995–1996)

Michael Laurence Birkbeck (born March 10, 1961) is a college baseball coach and former baseball pitcher. He played for the Milwaukee Brewers and New York Mets of Major League Baseball, and the Yokohama BayStars of Nippon Professional Baseball. He is currently the pitching coach at Kent State University.

Birkbeck attended Orrville High School in Orrville, Ohio and played college baseball at the University of Akron. Birkbeck's promising debut years were compromised by injury, culminating in a broken fibula on a comebacker from Shane Mack during his stint with Yokohama, which effectively ended his career. He retired as a player in 1996.

In six MLB seasons, Birkbeck had a 12–19 win–loss record, 54 games pitched (51 started), two complete games, 270 1/3 innings pitched, 319 hits allowed, 158 runs allowed, 146 earned runs allowed, 27 home runs allowed, 93 walks allowed, 149 strikeouts, four hit batters, eight wild pitches, 1,196 batters faced, four intentional walks, 12 balks and a 4.86 ERA.

Birkbeck was hired as the pitching coach for the Kent State Golden Flashes in 1997 and was later promoted to associate head coach. In 2012, he was named the ABCA/Baseball America Assistant Coach of the Year.
