= Juan Nieves =

Puerto Rican baseball player & coach (born 1965)

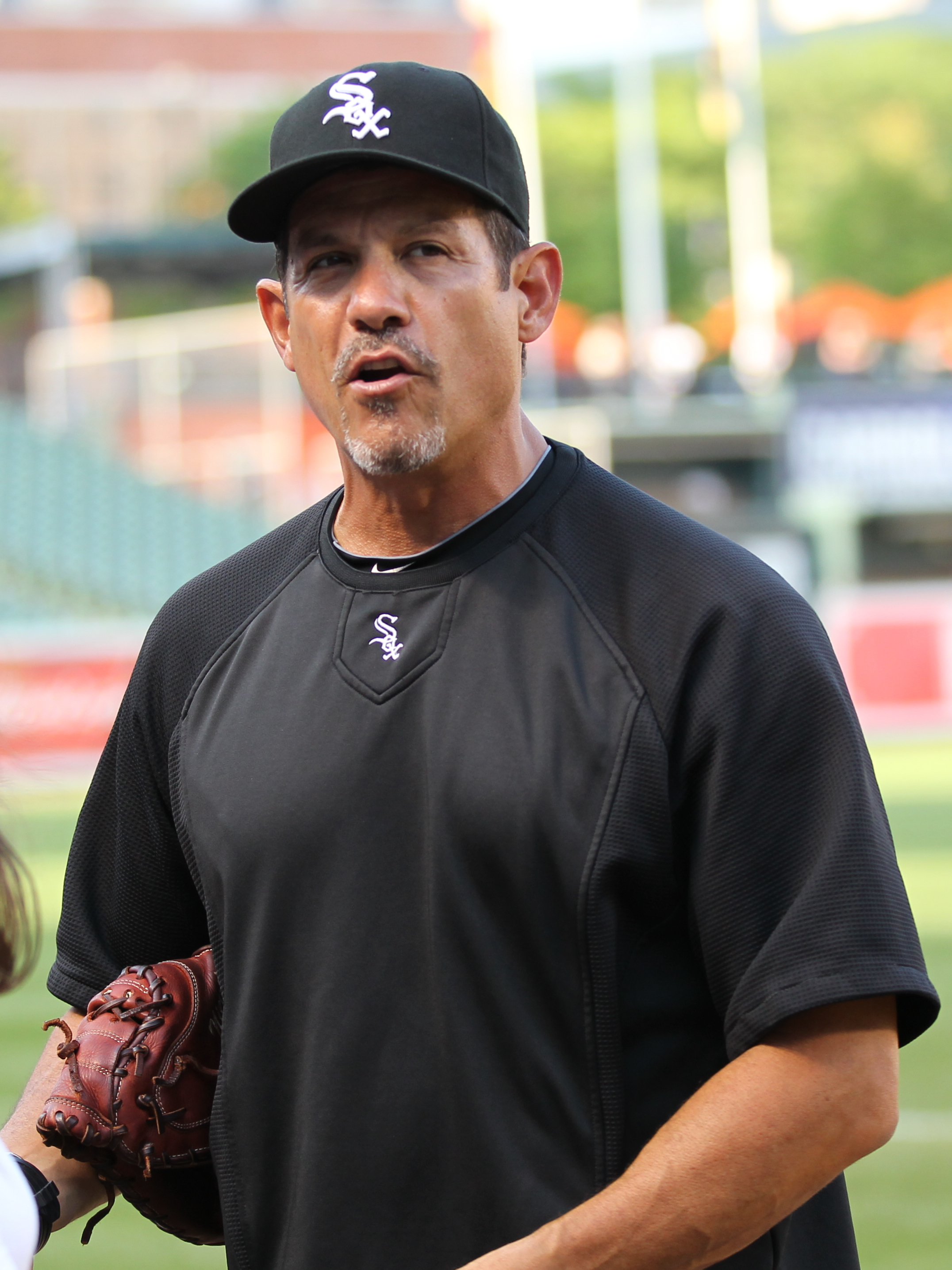
- Nieves with the Chicago White Sox in 2011
- Pitcher / Coach
- Born: January 5, 1965 (age 61); Santurce, Puerto Rico
- Batted: Left Threw: Left

MLB debut
- April 10, 1986, for the Milwaukee Brewers

Last MLB appearance
- October 2, 1988, for the Milwaukee Brewers

MLB statistics
- Win–loss record: 32–25
- Earned run average: 4.71
- Strikeouts: 352
- Stats at Baseball Reference

Teams
- As player: Milwaukee Brewers (1986–1988); As coach: Chicago White Sox (2008–2012); Boston Red Sox (2013–2015); Miami Marlins (2016–2018); Detroit Tigers (2021–2026)

Career highlights and awards
- World Series champion (2013); Pitched a no-hitter on April 15, 1987

Juan Manuel Nieves Cruz (born January 5, 1965) is a Puerto Rican professional baseball pitcher and coach who most recently served as the assistant pitching coach for the Detroit Tigers of Major League Baseball (MLB). He played in MLB for the Milwaukee Brewers from 1986 to 1988. He has previously coached in MLB for the Chicago White Sox, Boston Red Sox, and Miami Marlins.

== Playing career ==
Nieves was signed by the Milwaukee Brewers, with a $115,000 signing bonus, after he had a 19–1 win–loss record with a 1.05 earned run average (ERA) during his senior season at the Avon Old Farms school in Connecticut.

On April 15, 1987, Nieves threw a no-hitter against the Baltimore Orioles, becoming the first Puerto Rican pitcher in Major League history to do so. He threw the only no-hitter for the Brewers until 2021.

Nieves was mostly a starter, but on September 5, 1988, he earned his only career save against the Chicago White Sox. He threw one perfect inning, closing out a 5–2 Brewers victory and saving the game for starter Don August.

After playing for the Brewers from 1986 to 1988, he suffered a career-ending arm injury.

== Coaching career ==
Nieves worked as a minor league pitching instructor for the New York Yankees (1992–1996) and the White Sox (1999–2007) before joining the Chicago White Sox Major League staff as the bullpen coach serving for the next five seasons. He was mentored by Don Cooper, first when Cooper was the White Sox' roving coordinator in their minor league hierarchy, and later when Cooper became the pitching coach of the Sox. They became really close, adapting similar pitching styles, and Nieves was named as "Cooper's right-hand man". He was named Boston's 2013 pitching coach on November 7, 2012. He brought over Cooper's style of pitching to the Red Sox organization. Nieves led the Red Sox to the second lowest earned run average in the American League as the team went on to win the World Series. After the Red Sox earned the second highest team ERA (4.86) to start the 2015 season, Nieves was dismissed by the team on May 7, 2015.

Nieves spent the next three seasons as pitching coach for the Miami Marlins, being dismissed after the 2018 season.

On November 6, 2020, the Detroit Tigers named Nieves as the team's assistant pitching coach for the 2021 season. Nieves had spent the previous two seasons as the pitching coach for the Toledo Mud Hens, the Tigers Triple-A affiliate. On September 29, 2026, the Tigers announced that they would be parting ways with Nieves.

== See also ==
- List of Major League Baseball no-hitters

Awards and achievements
Preceded by Mike Scott	No-hitter pitcher April 15, 1987	Succeeded by Tom Browning
Sporting positions
Preceded by Randy Niemann	Boston Red Sox pitching coach 2013–2015	Succeeded by Carl Willis
Preceded by Chuck Hernandez	Miami Marlins pitching coach 2016–2018	Succeeded by Mel Stottlemyre Jr.
