= Mark Knudson =

American baseball player (born 1960)

- Pitcher
- Born: October 28, 1960 (age 65); Denver, Colorado, U.S.
- Batted: Right Threw: Right

MLB debut
- July 8, 1985, for the Houston Astros

Last MLB appearance
- May 14, 1993, for the Colorado Rockies

MLB statistics
- Win–loss record: 24–29
- Earned run average: 4.72
- Strikeouts: 195
- Stats at Baseball Reference

Teams
- Houston Astros (1985–1986); Milwaukee Brewers (1986–1991); Colorado Rockies (1993)

Mark Richard Knudson (born October 28, 1960) is an American former right-handed professional baseball pitcher. He played all or part of eight seasons in Major League Baseball (MLB), between 1985 and 1993, primarily for the Milwaukee Brewers.

== Professional career ==
=== Houston Astros ===
Knudson was drafted by the Houston Astros in the third round of the 1982 amateur draft out of Colorado State University. He made his debut with the club on July 8, 1985, and took a 7–4 loss to the Philadelphia Phillies. He won his first major league game on July 10 of the following season, also against the Phillies. On August 15, 1986, he and fellow pitcher Don August were traded to the Milwaukee Brewers for pitcher Danny Darwin.

=== Milwaukee Brewers ===
Knudson pitched as both a starter and long reliever for Milwaukee over the next five seasons, and in 1989 compiled an 8–5 record with a 3.35 ERA. In 1990, he earned a career-best 10 wins.

After starting and gaining the victory on Opening Day 1991 against the Texas Rangers, Knudson contracted a virus that seriously affected his performance. He came down with a 103-degree fever and lost 10 pounds. He missed most of that season and was sent to Triple-A Denver to finish the year, where he helped the Zephyrs win the American Association championship. He was designated for assignment at the end of the year; when he refused, the club released him outright.

=== Colorado Rockies ===
Knudson spent the 1992 season in the San Diego Padres organization before signing with the expansion Colorado Rockies in 1993. He only pitched briefly for the team, however. After struggling and posting a 22.24 ERA in just four appearances, he permanently retired from the game.

== Personal life ==
One week after he retired, Knudson's wife gave birth to triplets. A native of Denver, Knudson was the first hometown product to play for the Rockies.To date, he is the only person to have ever played high school baseball (Northglenn High School) college baseball (Colorado State) minor league baseball (Triple A Denver Zephyrs) and major league baseball (Colorado Rockies) in Colorado. During his career, Knudson posted wins over three of the four members of the 4,000 strikeout club, Nolan Ryan, Roger Clemens and Randy Johnson.

Since retiring, Knudson has worked in sports media, working for various print and website publications and radio stations. He was also a TV commentator on the Mountain West TV Network. He now writes weekly columns for Mile High Sports and is a high school baseball coach in suburban Denver. He has also published two books, "Pitching to the Corners" co-written with former teammate Don August and "Just Imagine" as historical fiction book about The Beatles.
