= 1987 Kansas City Royals season =

1987 Kansas City Royals
- League: American League
- Division: West
- Ballpark: Royals Stadium
- City: Kansas City, Missouri
- Record: 83–79 (.512)
- Divisional place: 2nd
- Owners: Ewing Kauffman
- General managers: John Schuerholz
- Managers: Billy Gardner, John Wathan
- Television: WDAF-TV (Denny Matthews, Denny Trease, Fred White)
- Radio: WIBW (AM) (Denny Matthews, Fred White)

The 1987 Kansas City Royals season was the 19th season for the franchise, and their 15th at Kauffman Stadium. It involved the Royals finishing second in the American League West with a record of 83 wins and 79 losses.

== Offseason ==
- December 10, 1986: Scott Bankhead, Steve Shields, and Mike Kingery were traded by the Royals to the Seattle Mariners for Danny Tartabull and Rick Luecken.
- December 22, 1986: Alan Hargesheimer was released by the Royals.
- March 20, 1987: Derek Botelho was traded by the Cincinnati Reds to the Kansas City Royals for Eddie Tanner (minors) and Pete Carey (minors).
- March 27, 1987: David Cone and Chris Jelic were traded by the Royals to the New York Mets for Ed Hearn, Rick Anderson, and Mauro Gozzo.
- March 30, 1987: Jim Sundberg was traded by the Royals to the Chicago Cubs for Thad Bosley and Dave Gumpert.
- March 31, 1987: Larry Owen was signed as a free agent by the Royals.
- Billy Gardner is officially named the team's manager as Dick Howser's replacement during spring training. Howser had contracted brain cancer the previous season and was relieved of duty at the All-Star break. Howser attempted to return as manager for the season, but was physically incapable due to after-effects from his cancer treatments.

== Regular season ==
=== Season standings ===
AL West
Team	W	L	Pct.	GB	Home	Road
Minnesota Twins	85	77	.525	—	56‍–‍25	29‍–‍52
Kansas City Royals	83	79	.512	2	46‍–‍35	37‍–‍44
Oakland Athletics	81	81	.500	4	42‍–‍39	39‍–‍42
Seattle Mariners	78	84	.481	7	40‍–‍41	38‍–‍43
Chicago White Sox	77	85	.475	8	38‍–‍43	39‍–‍42
Texas Rangers	75	87	.463	10	43‍–‍38	32‍–‍49
California Angels	75	87	.463	10	38‍–‍43	37‍–‍44

=== Record vs. opponents ===
1987 American League record Sources:
Team	BAL	BOS	CAL	CWS	CLE	DET	KC	MIL	MIN	NYY	OAK	SEA	TEX	TOR
Baltimore	—	1–12	9–3	8–4	7–6	4–9	9–3	2–11	5–7	3–10	7–5	4–8	7–5	1–12
Boston	12–1	—	4–8	3–9	7–6	2–11	6–6	6–7	7–5	7–6	4–8	7–5	7–5	6–7
California	3–9	8–4	—	8–5	7–5	3–9	5–8	7–5	8–5	3–9	6–7	7–6	5–8	5–7
Chicago	4–8	9–3	5–8	—	7–5	3–9	6–7	6–6	6–7	5–7	9–4	6–7	7–6	4–8
Cleveland	6–7	6–7	5–7	5–7	—	4–9	6–6	4–9	3–9	6–7	4–8	5–7	2–10	5–8
Detroit	9–4	11–2	9–3	9–3	9–4	—	5–7	6–7	8–4	5–8	5–7	7–5	8–4	7–6
Kansas City	3–9	6–6	8–5	7–6	6–6	7–5	—	4–8	8–5	5–7	5–8	9–4	7–6	8–4
Milwaukee	11–2	7–6	5–7	6–6	9–4	7–6	8–4	—	3–9	7–6	6–6	4–8	9–3	9–4
Minnesota	7–5	5–7	5–8	7–6	9–3	4–8	5–8	9–3	—	6–6	10–3	9–4	6–7	3–9
New York	10–3	6–7	9–3	7–5	7–6	8–5	7–5	6–7	6–6	—	5–7	7–5	5–7	6–7
Oakland	5–7	8–4	7–6	4–9	8–4	7–5	8–5	6–6	3–10	7–5	—	5–8	6–7	7–5
Seattle	8–4	5–7	6–7	7–6	7–5	5–7	4–9	8–4	4–9	5–7	8–5	—	9–4	2–10
Texas	5–7	5–7	8–5	6–7	10–2	4–8	6–7	3–9	7–6	7–5	7–6	4–9	—	3–9
Toronto	12–1	7–6	7–5	8–4	8–5	6–7	4–8	4–9	9–3	7–6	5–7	10–2	9–3	—

=== Notable transactions ===
- June 2, 1987: Bret Barberie was drafted by the Royals in the 65th round of the 1987 Major League Baseball draft, but did not sign.

=== Notable events ===
- June 17, 1987: Manager Dick Howser passes away from brain cancer.

=== Roster ===
1987 Kansas City Royals roster
Roster
Pitchers: 17 Rick Anderson; 40 Bud Black; 49 John Davis; 26 Steve Farr; 28 Gene Garber; 39 Jerry Don Gleaton; 23 Mark Gubicza; 30 Dave Gumpert; 15 Danny Jackson; 37 Charlie Leibrandt; 31 Mélido Pérez; 29 Dan Quisenberry; 18 Bret Saberhagen; 31 Bob Shirley; 19 Bob Stoddard	Catchers: 7 Ed Hearn; 28 Mike Macfarlane; 24 Larry Owen; 9 Jamie Quirk; Infielders: 45 Steve Balboni; 1 Buddy Biancalana; 5 George Brett; 3 Ross Jones; 38 Scotti Madison; 32 Bill Pecota; 2 Ángel Salazar; 33 Kevin Seitzer; 20 Frank White	Outfielders: 12 Juan Beníquez; 27 Thad Bosley; 16 Bo Jackson; 21 Lonnie Smith; 4 Danny Tartabull; 25 Gary Thurman; 6 Willie Wilson; Other batters: 22 Jim Eisenreich; 11 Hal McRae; 3 Jorge Orta	Manager: 14 Billy Gardner; 12 John Wathan; Coaches: 43 Gary Blaylock; 41 Joe Jones; 42 José Martínez; 11 Hal McRae; 46 Ed Napoleon; 44 Jimmie Schaffer

== Player stats ==
= Indicates team leader

= Indicates league leader

=== Batting ===
==== Starters by position ====
Note: Pos = Position; G = Games played; AB = At bats; H = Hits; Avg. = Batting average; HR = Home runs; RBI = Runs batted in

Pos	Player	G	AB	H	Avg.	HR	RBI
C	Jamie Quirk	109	296	70	.236	5	33
1B	George Brett	115	427	124	.290	22	78
2B	Frank White	154	563	138	.245	17	78
3B	Kevin Seitzer	161	641	207	.323	15	83
SS	Ángel Salazar	116	317	65	.205	2	21
LF	Bo Jackson	116	396	93	.235	22	53
CF	Willie Wilson	146	610	170	.279	4	30
RF	Danny Tartabull	158	582	180	.309	34	101
DH	Steve Balboni	121	386	80	.207	24	60

==== Other batters ====
Note: G = Games played; AB = At bats; H = Hits; Avg. = Batting average; RBI = Runs batted in

Player	G	AB	H	Avg.	HR	RBI
Juan Beníquez	57	174	41	.236	3	26
Lonnie Smith	48	167	42	.251	3	8
Larry Owen	76	164	31	.189	5	14
Bill Pecota	66	156	43	.276	3	14
Thad Bosley	80	140	39	.279	1	16
Ross Jones	39	114	29	.254	0	10
Jim Eisenreich	44	105	25	.238	4	21
Gary Thurman	27	81	24	.296	0	5
Jorge Orta	21	50	9	.180	2	4
Buddy Biancalana	37	47	10	.213	1	7
Hal McRae	18	32	10	.313	1	9
Mike MacFarlane	8	19	4	.211	0	3
Ed Hearn	6	17	5	.294	0	3
Scotti Madison	7	15	4	.267	0	0

=== Pitching ===
==== Starting pitchers ====
Note: G = Games pitched; IP = Innings pitched; W = Wins; L = Losses; ERA = Earned run average; SO = Strikeouts

Player	G	IP	W	L	ERA	SO
Bret Saberhagen	33	257.0	18	10	3.36	163
Mark Gubicza	35	241.2	13	18	3.98	166
Charlie Leibrandt	35	240.1	16	11	3.41	151
Danny Jackson	36	224.0	9	18	4.02	152
Mélido Pérez	3	10.1	1	1	7.84	5

==== Other pitchers ====
Note: G = Games pitched; IP = Innings pitched; W = Wins; L = Losses; ERA = Earned run average; SO = Strikeouts

Player	G	IP	W	L	ERA	SO
Bud Black	29	122.1	8	6	3.60	61
Rick Anderson	6	13.0	0	2	13.85	12

==== Relief pitchers ====
Note: G = Games pitched; W = Wins; L = Losses; SV = Saves; ERA = Earned run average; SO = Strikeouts

Player	G	W	L	SV	ERA	SO
Dan Quisenberry	47	4	1	8	2.76	17
Jerry Don Gleaton	48	4	4	5	4.26	44
Steve Farr	47	4	3	1	4.15	88
John Davis	27	5	2	2	2.27	24
Bob Stoddard	17	1	3	1	4.28	23
Gene Garber	13	0	0	8	2.51	
Dave Gumpert	8	0	0	0	6.05	13
Bob Shirley	3	0	0	0	14.73	1

== Farm system ==
Level	Team	League	Manager
AAA	Omaha Royals	American Association	John Wathan and Frank Funk
AA	Memphis Chicks	Southern League	Bob Schaefer
A	Fort Myers Royals	Florida State League	Jerry Terrell
A	Appleton Foxes	Midwest League	Ken Berry
A-Short Season	Eugene Emeralds	Northwest League	Rick Mathews
Rookie	GCL Royals	Gulf Coast League	Luis Silverio
