= History of the Kansas City Royals =

History of Major League Baseball franchise

The following is a detailed history of the Kansas City Royals, a Major League Baseball team that began play in 1969 in Kansas City, Missouri. The team is currently in the American League Central Division. The franchise has won two wild card berths, seven division titles, four league championships, and two World Series titles.

== Baseball returns to Kansas City ==
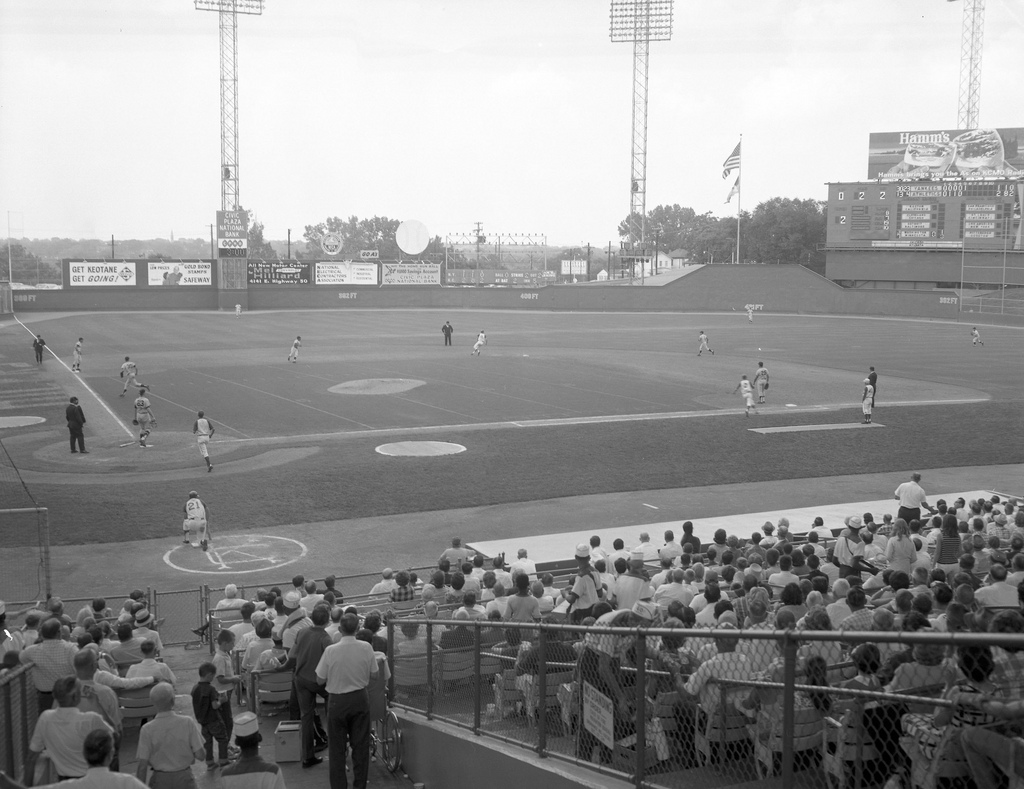
Municipal Stadium, home of the Royals from their inception until 1973

When the Kansas City Athletics moved to Oakland after the 1967 season, Kansas City was left without major league baseball, or professional baseball at all, for the first time since 1883. Athletics owner Charlie Finley explored many relocation plans and essentially shunned Kansas City before the franchise even left. An enraged Senator Stuart Symington threatened to introduce legislation removing baseball's antitrust exemption unless Kansas City was granted a team in the next round of expansion. Major League Baseball complied with a hasty round of expansion at the 1967 winter meetings. Kansas City was awarded one of four teams to begin play in 1971. However, Symington was not satisfied with having Kansas City wait three years for baseball to return there, and pressured MLB to allow the new teams to start play two years earlier than the original plan in 1969. Symington's intervention may have contributed to the financial collapse of the Royals' companion expansion team, the Seattle Pilots, who had to begin play in 1969 before they were ready (unlike in other sports, baseball leagues need an even number of franchises to preserve symmetry for scheduling purposes).

Pharmaceutical executive Ewing Kauffman won the bidding for the new Kansas City team. He conducted a contest to determine the best and most appropriate name for the new franchise. Sanford Porte from Overland Park, Kansas submitted the name Royals, in recognition of Missouri's billion-dollar livestock industry. His suggestion was that the American Royal best exemplified Kansas City through its pageantry and parade, so the new team should be named the Royals. The name was selected out of 17,000 submissions and the Royals Board voted 6–1 to adopt the name. The one dissenting vote was Kauffman's. He eventually changed his mind after the name grew on him. (Some sources say it was in honor of the Kansas City Monarchs, a Negro leagues team.) The team's logo, a crown atop a shield with the letters "KC" inside the shield, was created by Shannon Manning, an artist at Hallmark Cards, based in Kansas City.

== 1969–1979: Taking off ==
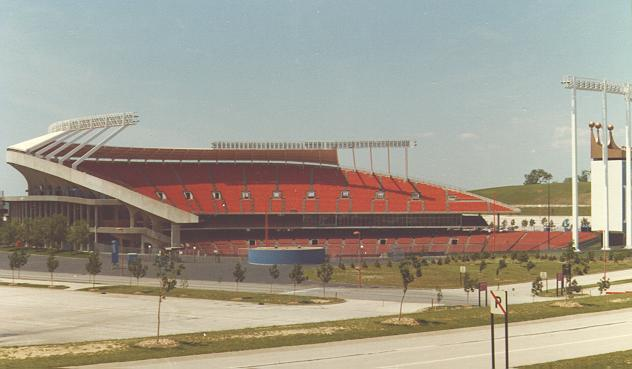
Kauffman Stadium (then Royals Stadium), home of the Royals beginning in 1973

The Royals began operations with General Manager Cedric Tallis, who soon developed a reputation as the best trader in the league. The first big trade was with fellow expansion team Seattle, which brought in 1969 Rookie of the Year Lou Piniella. In their inaugural game, on April 8, 1969, the Royals defeated the Minnesota Twins 4–3 in 12 innings. Two pitching stars from the Baltimore Orioles team that won the 1966 World Series pitched for the Royals in the inaugural game: Wally Bunker threw the franchise's very first pitch, and Moe Drabowsky won the game in relief. After finishing the season in 5th place, the Royals' next trade cemented a reputation as a speedy team. Third baseman Joe Foy was traded to the New York Mets for speedy outfielder Amos Otis, who would become the Royals' first star. Further one-sided trades brought to the Royals second baseman Cookie Rojas, bullpen ace Ted Abernathy, shortstop Fred Patek, first baseman John Mayberry and left fielder Hal McRae. The Royals also invested in a strong farm system and in the early years developed such future stars as pitchers Paul Splittorff and Steve Busby, infielders George Brett and Frank White, and outfielder Al Cowens.

In 1971, the Royals had their first winning season, with manager Bob Lemon guiding them to a second-place finish. In 1973, under Jack McKeon, the Royals adopted their iconic "powder blue" road uniforms and moved from Municipal Stadium to the brand-new Royals Stadium. The stadium had deep outfield walls and artificial turf, and gave future young stars the opportunity to build a playing style involving aggressive baserunning and good defense. The stadium, part of the Truman Sports Complex, was built alongside Arrowhead Stadium, the home of the Kansas City Chiefs of the National Football League (NFL). Unlike many of the new stadiums going up at the time, Kansas City chose dedicated stadiums for their sports teams over one multi-purpose stadium.

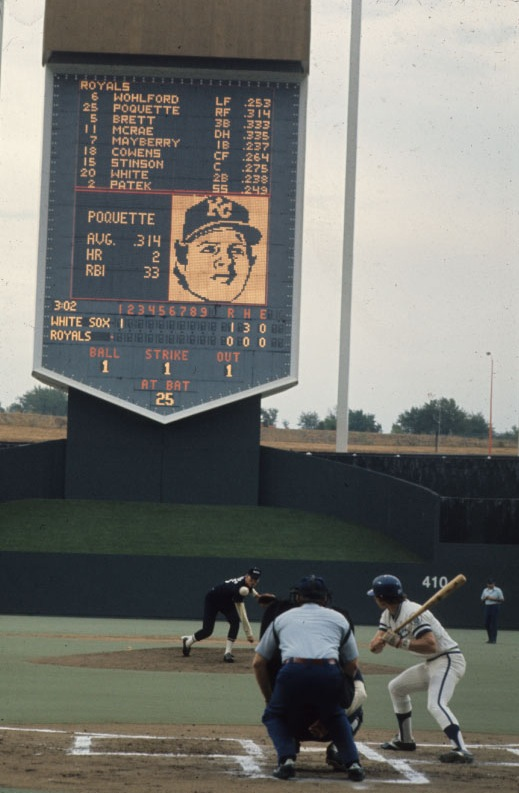
A game against the White Sox at Royals Stadium on September 19, 1976

Manager Whitey Herzog replaced McKeon in 1975, and the Royals began their ascension to the top of the American League West. They finished 1975 with a 91–71 record, second to the Oakland Athletics. That season, John Mayberry finished second to Boston's Fred Lynn in the MVP voting. The 1976 season brought secured dominance to the Royals. First, George Brett defeated his own teammate Hal McRae to win the batting title on the season's final day. Second, the Royals won the first of three straight Western Division championships. They lost to the New York Yankees in three straight American League Championship Series encounters, despite winning more regular season games in two of those years. In two of those years, they lost the AL Championship Series in the ninth inning of the fifth and final game. However, the three playoffs series helped George Brett become a superstar, as he homered three times in a losing effort in the final game of the 1978 playoff series. In addition to a nucleus of Brett, White, McRae, and Cowens, these Royals teams featured pitchers Dennis Leonard and Larry Gura, closer Dan Quisenberry, and position players Willie Wilson, U.L. Washington and Darrell Porter. The 1977 season, however, ended on another sour note as Herzog demanded that John Mayberry be traded or he would threaten to leave the team. This resulted in Mayberry being traded to the Toronto Blue Jays.

== 1980–1984: From pennant to pine tar ==
After the Royals finished in second place in 1979, Herzog was fired and replaced by Jim Frey. Most believe that the firing was due to Herzog's strained relationship with the Royals front office including General Manager Joe Burke, owner Ewing Kauffman, and Kauffman's wife, Muriel. Under Frey, the Royals rebounded in 1980 and advanced to the ALCS, where they again faced the Yankees. The team was led by Brett, who flirted with a .400 batting average and won the AL MVP, and Willie Wilson, who electrified crowds with stolen bases and inside-the-park home runs.

In the 1980 ALCS, the Royals finally vanquished the Yankees in a three-game sweep punctuated by a George Brett home run off Yankees' star closer Goose Gossage. Frank White was named the playoffs MVP for all-around steady play and heroics. However, after reaching their first World Series, the Royals fell to the Philadelphia Phillies in six games. The Phillies featured future Hall of Famers Mike Schmidt and Steve Carlton, as well as all-time hits leader Pete Rose. In the series, Willie Aikens became the first player in World Series history to homer twice in two separate Series games.

The Royals returned to the post-season in 1981, losing to the Oakland Athletics in a unique divisional series resulting from the split-season caused by the 1981 Major League Baseball strike.

In 1983, the Royals were headed for a second-place finish behind the Chicago White Sox when they were rocked by scandals. The first event added another chapter to the team's heated rivalry with the Yankees. In a July game between the two teams, third baseman George Brett hit a go-ahead home run in the top of the ninth inning. After Brett crossed home plate and returned to the dugout, Yankees manager Billy Martin complained that Brett had more pine tar on his bat than baseball's rules allowed. After inspecting the bat, the umpires disallowed the home run and called Brett out, ending the game. The signature image from the event was Brett storming angrily out of the dugout to argue the call.

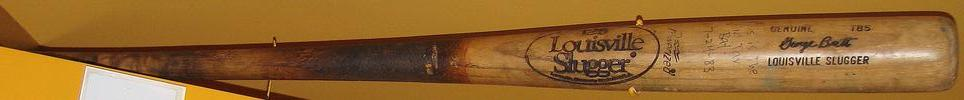
The baseball bat used by George Brett in the Pine Tar Incident on July 24, 1983

The second scandal of the 1983 season was far more serious, involving a truly illegal substance and several Royals players. Leadoff hitter and center fielder Willie Wilson, power-hitting first baseman Willie Aikens, power-hitting outfielder Jerry Martin, and starting pitcher Vida Blue, who had been released on August 5, were charged with attempting to purchase cocaine. The four were charged in October 1983, pleaded guilty, spent three months in prison, and were suspended by commissioner Bowie Kuhn for the entire 1984 season. The four appealed and were permitted to return on May 15. In response to the scandal, owner Ewing Kauffman founded the Ewing Marion Kauffman foundation to give back to the community, allowed Martin to depart via free agency, and traded Aikens, retaining only Wilson's services.

The 1983 season was also notable for some transitional changes in the Royals organization. First, owner Ewing Kauffman sold 49% of his interest to Memphis developer Avron Fogelman. Second, John Schuerholz was named general manager. Schuerholz soon bolstered the farm system with pitchers Bud Black, Danny Jackson, Mark Gubicza, David Cone, and Bret Saberhagen, as well as hitters such as Kevin Seitzer.

Under the leadership of manager Dick Howser, the Royals – relying on Brett's bat and the young pitching of Saberhagen, Gubicza, Bud Black, Danny Jackson, and Charlie Leibrandt – won the franchise's fifth division championship in 1984, although they were swept by the eventual World Series champion Detroit Tigers in the American League Championship Series

== 1985: "The I-70 Series" ==
In the 1985 regular season the Royals topped the Western Division for the sixth time in ten years, led by Bret Saberhagan's Cy Young Award-winning performance. In the last week of the season, Brett put on an amazing hitting streak that led the Royals climb from behind to overtake the California Angels in the standings. Throughout the ensuing playoffs, the Royals repeatedly put themselves into difficult positions, but improbably managed to escape each time. With the Royals down two games to zero in the American League Championship Series (ALCS) against the Toronto Blue Jays, George Brett put on a hitting show in Game 3, homering in his first two at bats and then doubling to the same right field location in his third at-bat. After falling behind 3–1 in the series, the Royals eventually rallied to win the series 4–3 (notably, the LCS had been expanded to a best-of-seven format for the first time in 1985, which allowed the Royals to survive at all). Brett was named ALCS MVP.

=== 1985 World Series ===
In the 1985 World Series against the cross-state St. Louis Cardinals – the so-called "I-70 Series" because the two teams are both located in the state of Missouri and connected by Interstate 70 – the Royals again fell behind 3–1. The key game in the Royals' comeback was Game 6. Facing elimination, the Royals trailed 1–0 in the bottom of the ninth inning, before rallying to score two runs and win. The rally was helped by a controversial call at first base by umpire Don Denkinger, which allowed Royals outfielder Jorge Orta to reach base safely as the first baserunner of the inning.

Following Orta's single, the Cardinals seemingly lost their concentration, dropping an easy popout and suffering a passed ball, before the Royals won with a bloop base hit by seldom used pinch hitter Dane Iorg, a former utility player for the Cardinals. Following the tension and frustration of Game Six, the Cardinals came undone in Game 7, and the Royals won 11–0 to clinch the franchise's first World Series title.

== 1986–1994: Staying in the picture ==
In 1986, the Royals fell suddenly from contender status, finishing with a 76–86 record and in 3rd place, 16 games behind the AL West champion California Angels. They also made one of the worst trades in franchise history, trading native Kansas Citian and future perennial All-Star David Cone for Ed Hearn. Hearn played for less than a month in Kansas City. The Royals were the trendy pre-season pick to return to the World Series in 1987, but the season proved bittersweet for the Royals. The team went 83–79 (a seven win improvement from 1986), and wound up finishing two games behind the eventual World Champion Minnesota Twins in the Western Division. Further, on June 17, 1987, Dick Howser died after a year-long battle with brain cancer. Howser's #10 soon became the first number that the Royals retired. Also in 1987, the team released longtime star Hal McRae and selected John Wathan as its new manager in midseason after firing Billy Gardner.

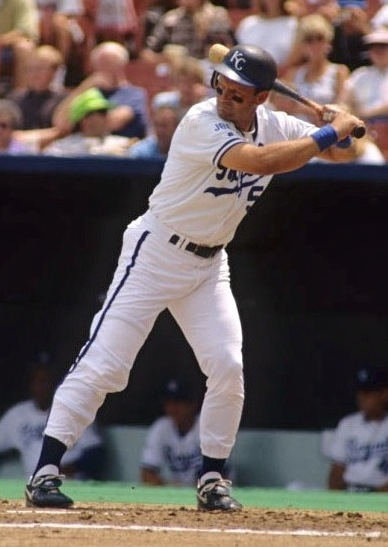
George Brett bats during a 1990 game at Royals Stadium

In the late 1980s and early 1990s, the Royals developed young stars such as Bo Jackson, Tom Gordon, and Kevin Seitzer, made some successful free-agent acquisitions, and generally posted winning records, but always fell short of the post-season. For example, in 1989, the Royals won 92 games and posted the third-best record in baseball, but did not qualify for the playoffs, finishing second in their division behind the eventual World Series champion Oakland Athletics. They also traded their star pitchers for questionable talent: Charlie Leibrandt for Gerald Perry, Bud Black for Pat Tabler, Danny Jackson for Kurt Stillwell, and Bret Saberhagen for Kevin McReynolds, Gregg Jefferies and Keith Miller.

At the end of the 1989 season, the team boasted a powerhouse pitching rotation, including the AL Cy Young Award-winner Bret Saberhagen (who set franchise record 23 wins that year), two-time All-Star Mark Gubicza (a 15-game winner in 1989) and 1989 AL Rookie of the Year runner-up Tom Gordon (who won 17 games that year). But the organization felt it was still missing a few necessary pieces to give its divisional rival Oakland Athletics a run for their money. For one thing, the Royals had been without a high-caliber closing pitcher since All-Star Dan Quisenberry was dropped in 1988. So prior to the 1990 season, the Royals acquired Mark Davis, the 1989 National League Cy Young Award-winner and league leader in saves, signing him to a four-year $13 million contract (the largest annual salary in baseball history at the time). The Royals also signed starting pitcher starting pitcher Storm Davis, who was coming off a career-high 19-game win season (third-best in the AL), to a three-year $6 million contract. Finally, the team also added pitcher Richard Dotson and traded for 1988 All-Star first baseman Gerald Perry. Kansas City's milestone off-season in 1989–1990 was its biggest commitment to free agents in the club's entire history.

Despite the promising off-season moves, the team suffered critical bullpen injuries while both newly signed Davises experienced lackluster seasons in 1990. The Royals concluded the season with a 75–86 record, in second-to-last place in the AL West (and with the worst franchise record since 1970). To make matters worse Bo Jackson – the team's potential future franchise player – suffered a devastating hip injury while playing football in the off-season, so the Royals waived him during spring training in 1991.

Many of the team's highlights from this era instead centered on the end of Brett's career, such as his third and final batting title in 1990 – which made him the first player to win batting titles in three different decades – and his 3,000th hit; Brett retired after the 1993 season. Though the team dropped out of contention from 1990 to 1992, through the strike-shortened 1994 season, the Royals still could generally be counted on to post winning records. The 1994 season was the club's last flirtation with greatness for two decades. Led by manager Hal McRae and Cy Young Award-winner David Cone (whom owner Ewing Kauffman had re-signed), the Royals had a 14-game winning streak just before the season ended prematurely due to the players' strike.

== 1995–2002: Decline in the post-Kauffman era ==
At the start of the 1990s, the Royals had been hit with a double-whammy when General Manager John Schuerholz departed in 1990 and team owner Ewing Kauffman died in 1993. Kauffman's death left the franchise without permanent ownership. Wal-Mart CEO David Glass, a longtime friend of Kauffman, took over as interim CEO while the Kauffman estate pursued a sale.

As Kauffman aged, he had been unable to find a buyer willing to keep the team in Kansas City. Under his will, upon his death the Royals were donated to the Greater Kansas City Community Foundation. The foundation would have six years to sell the team to a buyer who would keep the team in Kansas Citu, after which any potential new owner would theoretically be free to move the team. In 1998, lawyer and minor league executive Miles Prentice agreed in principle to buy the team for $75 million. To sweeten his package, Prentice added several prominent Kansas City residents to his syndicate, including Kauffman's daughter Julia. However, this was not enough to overcome concerns from the commissioner's office that Prentice's group was too big and had too little money, and the deal fell through.

Ultimately, Glass purchased the team himself for $96 million in 2000. Prentice actually submitted a larger bid than Glass, but MLB determined that Prentice's bid was not viable. MLB requires owners to have enough net worth to withstand substantial losses, and felt Prentice fell short of that mark. None of Kansas City's wealthy families at the time were willing to even consider buying the Royals (or any existing or potential professional team in Kansas City), leaving Glass as the only viable bidder who was willing to keep them in town.

Partly because of the resulting lack of leadership, after the 1994 season the Royals decided to reduce payroll by trading pitcher David Cone (again) and outfielder Brian McRae, then continued their salary dump in the 1995 season. In fact, the team payroll, which was always among the league's highest, was sliced from $40.5 million in 1994 (fourth-highest in the major leagues) to $18.5 million in 1996 (second-lowest in the major leagues).

In 1997, the Royals franchise had the opportunity to switch to the National League and play in the NL Central alongside its intrastate rival St. Louis Cardinals. The opportunity arose because Major League Baseball was planning to realign the divisions in preparation for expansion with the Arizona Diamondbacks and Tampa Bay Devil Rays. Bud Selig, baseball's acting commissioner and Milwaukee Brewers owner, gave the Royals the first option to change to the National League. That summer, the Royals were mired in the team's worst season since its second year of existence. Further, following Ewing Kauffman death, the franchise was being run by a board of directors and was up for sale. Ultimately, the board declined the move, and Milwaukee switched leagues instead.

Some commentators have argued that the Royals should have made the move. According to their logic, if the Royals had changed leagues, the team would have played the Cardinals more often and would have been in the same division with the Chicago Cubs; these teams might have drawn bigger crowds to Kauffman Stadium. Further, with no designated hitter in the National League, there would have been one less big salary to pay, which would have been easier for the Royals' front office to manage. Opinion at the time was fairly split. The Royals polled their fans, and reported that a slight majority of the 1,500 who returned surveys approved a move to the NL. Many fans, including former Royal Greg Pryor, thought that switching leagues was the only way to keep the Royals in Kansas City. On the other hand, there was also a strong sentiment among some fans that Kansas City was, is, and always would be an American League market. Back then, the glory years were not that far removed, and the emotional tie to the rivalry with the Yankees, for instance, was still burning. There was nothing in Kauffman's will or known feelings about how he would have received a move to the National League.

As the decade drew to a close, attendance at Royals games slid while the average MLB salary continued to rise, and the Royals found it difficult to retain their remaining stars. The team decided to trade players such as Kevin Appier, Johnny Damon and Jermaine Dye for prospects rather than pay higher salaries or lose them to free agency. By 1999, the Royals' payroll had fallen again to $16.5 million. Making matters worse, most of the younger players that the Royals received in exchange for these All-Stars proved of little value, setting the stage for an extended downward spiral.

In 1999, the Royals set a franchise low with a .398 winning percentage (64–97 record), and lost 97 games again in 2001. The records could have been even worse without the rapid development of center fielder Carlos Beltrán (Rookie of the Year in 1999) and first baseman Mike Sweeney.

In 2002, the Royals set a new team record for futility, losing 100 games for the first time in franchise history. The team also introduced new black and dark blue jerseys for alternate games, and also sleeveless home jerseys. The jerseys were met with mixed reactions in Kansas City, and eventually, by the 2006 season, the Royals again changed their uniforms back to their "old" style.

== 2003: A winning season ==
The 2003 season saw a temporary end to the losing, when manager Tony Peña, in his first full season with the club, guided the team to its first winning record (83–79) since 1994 and finished in third place in the AL Central. He was named the American League Manager of the Year for his efforts, and shortstop Ángel Berroa was named AL Rookie of the Year.

== 2004–2012: Rock bottom ==
From the 2004 season through the 2012 season, the Royals posted nine consecutive losing records – the longest streak in team history. In six of those seasons the team finished in last place in the American League Central, and in eight of those nine seasons the team also lost at least 90 games. The worst seasons came in 2004–2006, when the Royals lost at least 100 games each year and set the franchise's all-time record for losses (56–106 in 2005).

Picked by many to win their division in 2004 after faring surprisingly well in the free agent market, the Royals got off to a disappointing start and by late June again were in rebuilding mode, releasing veteran reliever Curtis Leskanic before financial incentives kicked in and trading veteran reliever Jason Grimsley and superstar center fielder Carlos Beltrán for prospects, all within a week of each other. The team subsequently fell apart completely, establishing a new low by losing 104 games. Worse yet, the younger players received in these trades again did little to immediately restock the team or its farm system, although Mark Teahen, acquired in the Beltrán trade, would blossom in 2006 (following a brief demotion to the minor leagues).

In 2005, the Royals continued their youth movement, with the second-lowest payroll in the Major Leagues. Six of the team's starting position players, three of the five starting pitchers, and the setup man and closer were all under the age of 30. After posting a miserable 8–25 record to start the season, Tony Peña resigned as manager on May 10; Buddy Bell was hired to replace him three weeks later. During that season, the Royals suffered a franchise record 19-game losing streak highlighted by a three-game stretch of blowout losses at home from August 6 through August 9; in that stretch the Royals lost 16–1 to the Oakland Athletics in the first game, were shut out 11–0 by Oakland in the second game, and then in the third game, against the Cleveland Indians, built a 7–2 lead in the ninth inning before allowing 11 runs to lose 13–7. The Royals finally ended their losing streak at 19 on August 20, two losses short of the American League record, with a 2–1 win over the Oakland Athletics. The Royals ended the 2005 season with a 56–106 record (.346), a full 43 games out of first place. It was the third time in four seasons that the team reestablished the mark for worst record in the history of the franchise. The team finished the season 10th in the American League in hitting (.263 AVG), 12th in runs scored (702) and last in pitching (5.49 ERA).

Looking for a quick turnaround, General Manager Allard Baird signed several veteran players prior to the 2006 season. He secured starting pitchers Mark Redman, Joe Mays and Scott Elarton. Baird also signed free agent second baseman Mark Grudzielanek, first baseman Doug Mientkiewicz and inked veteran Reggie Sanders to a two-year, $10 million deal. Although the new players seemed promising, they did not result in many additional wins. The Royals struggled through another 100-loss season in 2006, becoming just the 11th team in major league history to lose 100 games in three straight seasons. Following a major-league worst 13–37 start, the Royals fired Baird on May 31 and announced that Atlanta Braves assistant general manager Dayton Moore would be the team's new GM. Muzzy Jackson served as interim GM for the Royals, handling the first-year player draft, before Moore took over on June 8.

One problem often cited by commentators for the losing of those seasons was a lack of financial support from the team's owner, David Glass. For the first six years Glass owned the Royals (prior to the 2000 season) the team payroll was never higher than 21st in the major leagues, and it was in the league's bottom six payrolls on five occasions. Glass and the Royals also faced a minor controversy off the field in 2006, when the team revoked the credentials of two radio journalists present at the press conference introducing Moore. The two personalities – Bob Fescoe of WHB at the time and Rhonda Moss of KCSP – primarily asked pointed questions toward Glass over the firing of Baird. The aftermath included less than positive commentary from other media outlets in the metro and a statement from the Society of Professional Journalists calling for the reinstatement of their credentials. In response, the Royals started a weblog; the first entry defended the organization's decision.

Kansas City entered the 2007 season looking to rebound from four out of five seasons ending with at least 100 losses, and appeared to be opening up its wallet a bit, with a payroll exceeding $60 million for the first time (rising to 22nd-highest in the major leagues). The Royals outbid the Cubs and Blue Jays for free agent righty Gil Meche, signing him to five-year, $55 million contract. Reliever Octavio Dotel also inked a one-year, $5 million contract. The team also added several new prospects, including Alex Gordon and Billy Butler. Among Dayton Moore's first acts as General Manager was instating a new motto for the team: "True. Blue. Tradition."

In the 2007 MLB draft, the Royals selected shortstop Mike Moustakas at #2 overall, signing him minutes before the deadline. In June 2007, the Royals had their first winning month since July 2003, following up in July with their second-consecutive winning month of the season. On August 1, manager Buddy Bell announced his intentions to resign following the 2007 season. On September 12, the Royals defeated the Minnesota Twins 6–3 to win their 63rd game, guaranteeing that they would not lose 100 games in 2007. The victory ended the team's string of three consecutive seasons of 100 losses or more, but the team still finished in last place in its division with a record of 69–93.

Kansas City's 2008 season began with the team searching for its new manager. Early candidates to succeed Bell included Royals' bench coach Billy Doran, former Royals stars George Brett (Brett denied his intentions) and Frank White, and Triple-A Omaha manager Mike Jirschele. Former Major League managers such as Joe Girardi, Jim Fregosi, Ken Macha, and Jimy Williams. Atlanta Braves coaches Terry Pendleton and Brian Snitker were also in consideration. On October 19, the Royals hired Trey Hillman, former manager of the Nippon Ham Fighters and minor league manager of the New York Yankees, to be the 15th manager in franchise history.

As part of the Royals' "New. Blue. Tradition." motto, the Royals introduced a new rendition of their classic powder blue uniforms for the 2008 season, and ditched their black and sleeveless jerseys. The team wore the powder blue uniforms as alternates in weekend home games. The Royals previously wore powder blue uniforms from 1973 to 1991. The uniforms were introduced on December 6, 2007, at a special event for season ticket holders and were modeled by current players such as Alex Gordon and former players such as Frank White.

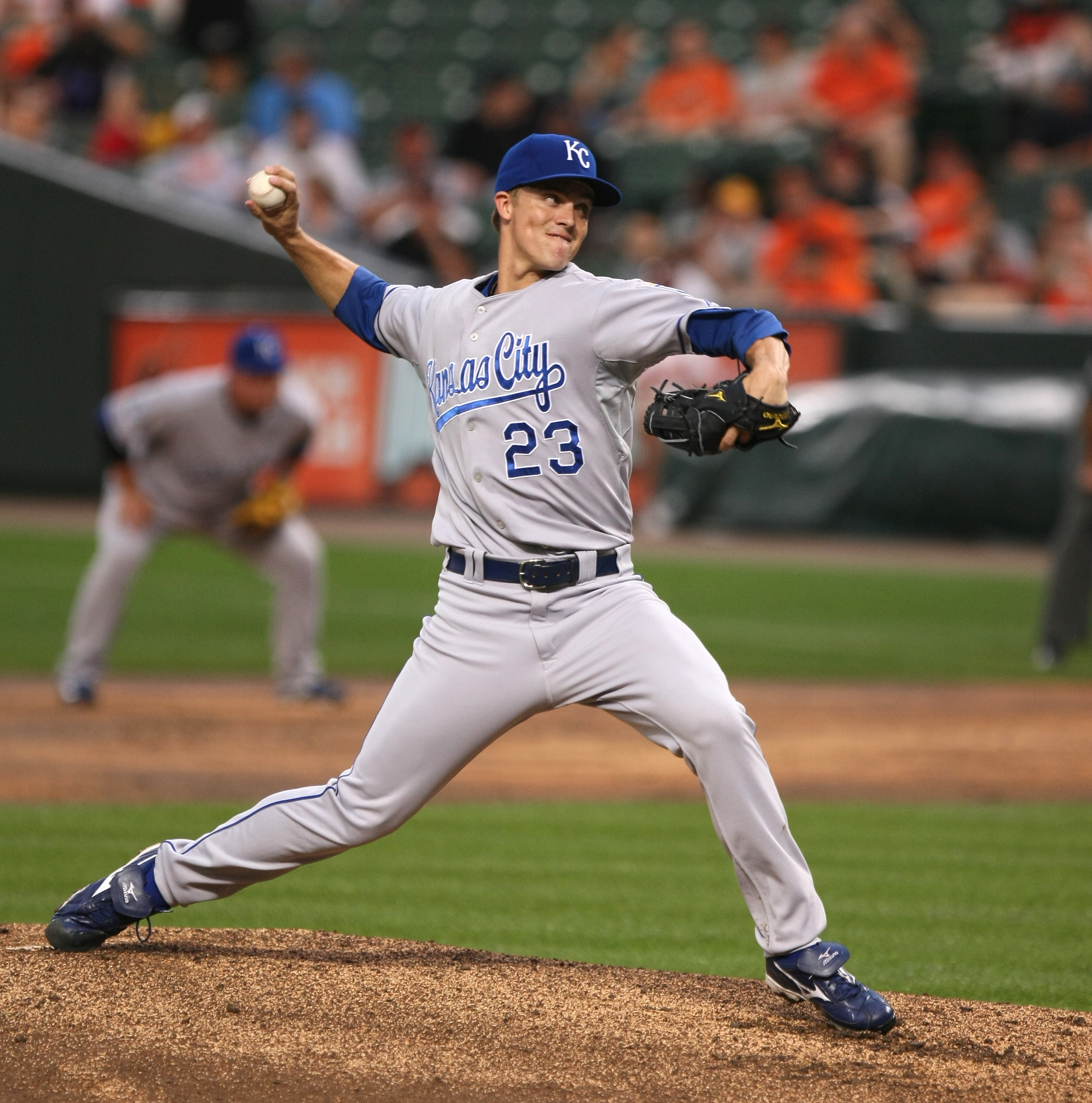
Zack Greinke did not allow an earned run in the first 24 innings of the 2009 season.

The Royals began the 2008 season 3–0 with a sweep over the Detroit Tigers, a team that many thought might win the AL pennant. Through 13 games, the Royals were 8–5 and in first place, a vast improvement over their 3–10 start from the previous season. However, by the All-Star break, the Royals were again in losing territory, with their record buoyed only by a 13–5 record in inter-league play, the best in the American League. During the season many players from the minors came up and made their presence felt including Ryan Shealy, Mitch Maier and Mike Avilés. The team finished the season in fourth place with a 75–87 record. It was the first time in five years the Royals did not finish last in their division and did not lose 93 or more games.

Prior to the 2009 season, the Royals renovated Kauffman Stadium. After the season began, the Royals ended April at the top of the AL Central, all of which raised excitement levels among fans. However, the team faded as the season progressed and finished the year with a final record of 65–97, in a last-place tie in its division (tied with the Cleveland Indians).

The 2009 season was highlighted by starter Zack Greinke, who did not allow an earned run in the first 24 innings of the season, went on to finish the year with a major league-leading 2.16 earned run average, and won the American League Cy Young Award. Greinke joined Bret Saberhagen (in 1985 and 1989) and David Cone (in 1994) as the only three players in Royals history to receive the award. He also set a club record 15 strikeouts in a single game against the Cleveland Indians.

The following year, in 2010, the Royals began with a rocky start, and after the team's record fell to 12–23, general manager Dayton Moore fired manager Trey Hillman. After Hillman's departure, former Milwaukee Brewers manager Ned Yost took over as manager. Despite the change, the Royals finished with a 67–95 record, in last place in the division for the sixth time in seven years.

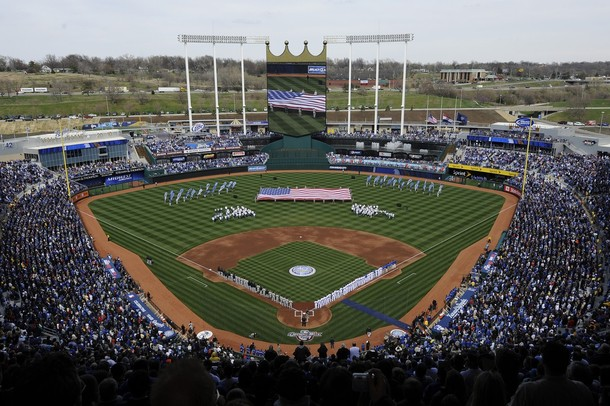
Kauffman Stadium underwent renovations in 2009, including the addition of a high-definition scoreboard.

In contrast to 2010, the Royals began the 2011 season with a hot start, tying for the best record in the American League with a 10–4 record after 14 games. The quick start followed a successful spring training season for the Royals. Success faded as the season progressed, however. The Royals last had a .500 record at 22–22, and then lost five games in a row. By the All-Star break, the Royals had a record of 37–54, the worst in the American League. On a more positive note, the season also saw the emergence of rookies such as Eric Hosmer and Aaron Crow, the team's representative in the 2011 All-Star game, as well as Alex Gordon's breakout year in left field, which resulted in him receiving a Gold Glove for his excellent display of defense and league leading 20 assists. The team ended with a fourth-place finish.

== 2013–2014: Return to contention ==
On December 10, 2012, in an attempt to strengthen the pitching staff (which was among the worst in baseball in 2012), the Royals traded for Rays pitchers James Shields and Wade Davis for Royals top prospect Wil Myers and three others. This trade helped catalyze a return to winning records.

The 2013 season got off to a very good start, as the Royals remained over .500 nearly most of April during regular season play. The team also did not commit an error in its first seven games (for 64 2/3 innings) for the first time in team history. On September 22, the Royals won their 82nd game of the season, to clinch their first winning season since 2003. The Royals finished the season 86–76, in third place in the AL Central, securing the team's best winning percentage since 1994.

The 2014 season was even more successful, featuring a return to the post-season for the first time in 29 years. On July 21, the Royals had a losing record (48–50) and were 8 games behind the Detroit Tigers in the AL Central standings. But spurred by a 22–5 record from July 22 to August 19, the Royals surged into first place in the AL Central. The Royals reached the top of the division standings on August 11, after winning their eighth game in a row. This marked the latest date the Royals had led their division since August 29, 2003. After taking over first place on August 11, the Royals retained the division lead for a month, falling out of first place permanently on September 12. The Royals finished the regular season one game behind Detroit in the AL Central, but secured the franchise's first ever wild card berth and first playoff appearance in 29 years.

The team's final regular season record of 89–73 in 2014 represented the most wins for the Royals since 1989. Coupled with a ten-game winning streak in June 2014, the Royals' eight-game winning streak in August 2014 was the second streak of at least that long during the same season, something the franchise had accomplished only three times previously – in 1977, 1978, and 1980.

The Royals made the most of that playoff run in 2014, going a record 8–0 for the first three rounds. They defeated the Oakland Athletics in the Wild Card Game, then swept both the Los Angeles Angels of Anaheim and the Baltimore Orioles in the ALDS and ALCS, respectively. However, the Royals fell a win short in the World Series, losing to the San Francisco Giants in seven games.

== 2015: Second World Series Championship ==
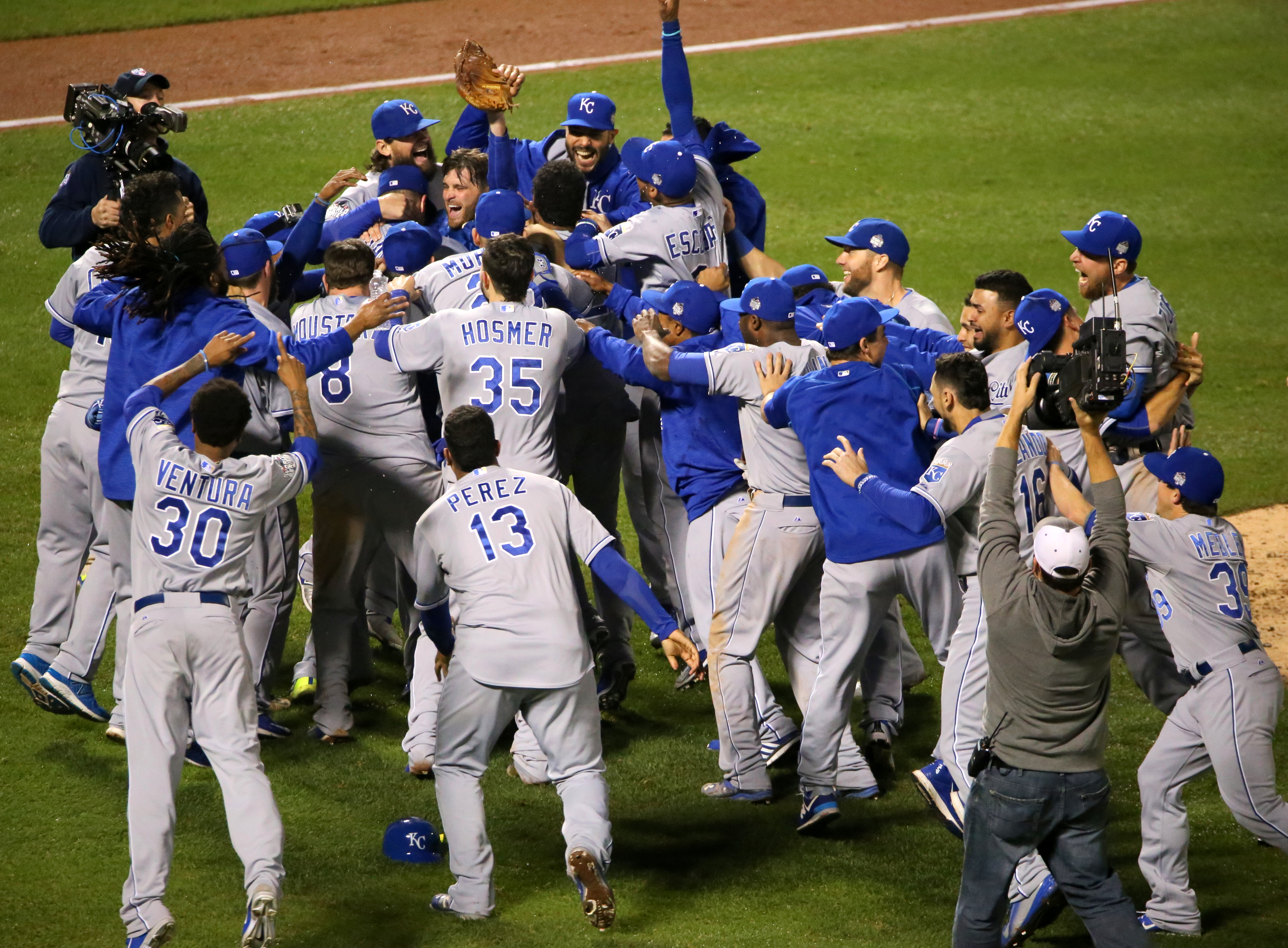
Kansas City's victory celebration after Game 5 of the 2015 World Series

Energized by the previous season's playoff run, the 2015 Royals won the American League Central, earning their first division title since 1985. In the ALDS against the Houston Astros, the Royals trailed in the series 2–1, and were on the verge of elimination after trailing by four runs heading into the eighth inning of Game 4. However, Kansas City scored seven runs in the final two innings to force a deciding game, before eliminating the Astros to advance to the ALCS. In a rematch of the 1985 ALCS against the Toronto Blue Jays, the Royals shut down Toronto's high-powered offense, winning the series in six games and advancing to their second straight World Series.

=== 2015 World Series ===
In the 2015 World Series against the New York Mets, the Royals continued to live up to their reputation as clutch performers. In Game 1, Alex Gordon tied the game in the bottom of the ninth inning with a home run, before Eric Hosmer drove in a game-winning sacrifice fly in the 14th inning. In Game 4, with the Mets on the verge of tying the series, the Royals scored three runs (one unearned) in the eighth inning to send them to within a game of the championship. Then in Game 5, with the Mets three outs away from forcing Game 6, the Royals scored two runs to tie the game, before seldom-used infielder Christian Colón drove in the go-ahead run in the 12th inning, helping Kansas City win 7–2 and clinch their second World Series championship. All Star catcher Salvador Pérez was named Series MVP for his clutch hitting and excellent pitch calling.

== 2016–present: Post-championship years ==
Following their World Series title, the Royals immediately fell back into mediocrity, finishing third in the AL Central in 2016 and 2017 with 81–81 and 80–82 records, respectively. The Royals lost All-Stars Hosmer and Lorenzo Cain to free agency and subsequently hit rock bottom once again, finishing both 2018 and 2019 with more than 100 losses. Yost retired at the end of the 2019 season and was replaced by Mike Matheny. In the pandemic-shortened 2020 season, the Royals went 26–34 in Matheny's first year at the helm.

In 2021, the Royals finished with a 74–88 record and placed fourth in the AL Central for the third year in a row. Salvador Pérez led the American League with 48 home runs and 121 RBIs. Beginning with the 2022 season, Dayton Moore was promoted to the team's President of Baseball Operations and J. J. Picollo began his tenure as general manager. Moore was fired by the end of the season. The Royals spent 2022 blending their roster with several rookies (including Bobby Witt Jr., MJ Melendez, and Vinnie Pasquantino among others), often fielding lineups with six or more rookies on a given night. The team finished in fourth place of the AL Central with a 65–97 record, and Matheny was fired after their season finale in Cleveland. On October 30, 2022, the Royals hired Matt Quatraro as their new manager.

== See also ==
- Kansas City Royals Baseball Academy
- List of Kansas City Royals seasons
