= 1989 Kansas City Royals season =

1989 Kansas City Royals
- League: American League
- Division: West
- Ballpark: Royals Stadium
- City: Kansas City, Missouri
- Record: 92–70 (.568)
- Divisional place: 2nd
- Owners: Ewing Kauffman
- General managers: John Schuerholz
- Managers: John Wathan
- Television: WDAF-TV (Paul Splittorff, Denny Trease)
- Radio: WIBW (AM) (Denny Matthews, Fred White)

The 1989 Kansas City Royals season was the 21st season for the franchise, their 17th at Kauffman Stadium and their 3rd full season under the management of John Wathan. It involved the Royals finishing second in the American League West with a record of 92 wins and 70 losses. The Royals' record was tied for the third best in baseball, but in the pre-wild card era, the team did not qualify for the post-season.

== Offseason ==
- November 30, 1988: Bob Boone was signed as a free agent by the Royals.
- December 6, 1988: Bill Buckner was signed as a free agent by the Royals.
- December 6, 1988: Mauro Gozzo was drafted by the Toronto Blue Jays from the Kansas City Royals in the 1988 minor league draft.
- March 22, 1989: Daryl Smith was signed as a free agent by the Royals.

== Regular season ==
- May 15, 1989: Royals pitcher Floyd Bannister threw exactly three pitches and recorded three outs. This was accomplished in the second inning.
- June 5, 1989: Kansas City outfielder Bo Jackson made a spectacular defensive play in a game against the Seattle Mariners at the Kingdome. With the game tied at 3–3 in the bottom of the 10th inning and Harold Reynolds on first, Scott Bradley lashed a double to deep left field. Reynolds, running with the pitch, thought he would easily score the winning run on the play, and was shocked when teammate Darnell Coles instructed him to slide. Jackson fielded Bradley's double and launched a flat-footed, 300-foot throw on the fly to Royals catcher Bob Boone, who tagged Reynolds out at the plate.
- During the season, Bret Saberhagen would be the last pitcher to win at least 20 games in one season for the Royals in the 20th century.
- The last time the Royals will win at least 90 games until the 2015 season.

=== Season standings ===
AL West
Team	W	L	Pct.	GB	Home	Road
Oakland Athletics	99	63	.611	—	54‍–‍27	45‍–‍36
Kansas City Royals	92	70	.568	7	55‍–‍26	37‍–‍44
California Angels	91	71	.562	8	52‍–‍29	39‍–‍42
Texas Rangers	83	79	.512	16	45‍–‍36	38‍–‍43
Minnesota Twins	80	82	.494	19	45‍–‍36	35‍–‍46
Seattle Mariners	73	89	.451	26	40‍–‍41	33‍–‍48
Chicago White Sox	69	92	.429	29½	35‍–‍45	34‍–‍47

=== Record vs. opponents ===
1989 American League record Sources:
Team	BAL	BOS	CAL	CWS	CLE	DET	KC	MIL	MIN	NYY	OAK	SEA	TEX	TOR
Baltimore	—	6–7	6–6	6–6	7–6	10–3	6–6	7–6	4–8	8–5	5–7	6–6	9–3	7–6
Boston	7–6	—	4–8	7–5	8–5	11–2	4–8	6–7	6–6	7–6	7–5	5–7	6–6	5–8
California	6–6	8–4	—	8–5	5–7	11–1	4–9	7–5	11–2	6–6	5–8	7–6	6–7	7–5
Chicago	6–6	5–7	5–8	—	7–5	4–8	6–7	10–2	5–8	5–6	5–8	7–6	3–10	1–11
Cleveland	6–7	5–8	7–5	5–7	—	5–8	8–4	3–10	5–7	9–4	2–10	6–6	7–5	5–8
Detroit	3–10	2–11	1–11	8–4	8–5	—	6–6	6–7	5–7	6–7	4–8	4–8	4–8	2–11
Kansas City	6–6	8–4	9–4	7–6	4–8	6–6	—	8–4	7–6	6–6	7–6	9–4	8–5	7–5
Milwaukee	6–7	7–6	5–7	2–10	10–3	7–6	4–8	—	9–3	8–5	5–7	7–5	5–7	6–7
Minnesota	8–4	6–6	2–11	8–5	7–5	7–5	6–7	3–9	—	6–6	6–7	7–6	5–8	9–3
New York	5–8	6–7	6–6	6–5	4–9	7–6	6–6	5–8	6–6	—	3–9	8–4	5–7	7–6
Oakland	7–5	5–7	8–5	8–5	10–2	8–4	6–7	7–5	7–6	9–3	—	9–4	8–5	7–5
Seattle	6–6	7–5	6–7	6–7	6–6	8–4	4–9	5–7	6–7	4–8	4–9	—	6–7	5–7
Texas	3–9	6–6	7–6	10–3	5–7	8–4	5–8	7–5	8–5	7–5	5–8	7–6	—	5–7
Toronto	6–7	8–5	5–7	11–1	8–5	11–2	5–7	7–6	3–9	6–7	5–7	7–5	7–5	—

=== Transactions ===
- June 5, 1989: Brent Mayne was drafted by the Kansas City Royals in the 1st round (13th pick) of the 1989 amateur draft. Player signed June 16, 1989.

=== Roster ===
1989 Kansas City Royals
Roster
Pitchers: 55 Kevin Appier; 27 Luis Aquino; 19 Floyd Bannister; 45 Bob Buchanan; 34 Stan Clarke; 49 Steve Crawford; 54 José DeJesús; 26 Steve Farr; 39 Jerry Don Gleaton; 36 Tom Gordon; 23 Mark Gubicza; 38 Terry Leach; 37 Charlie Leibrandt; 40 Rick Luecken; 34 Larry McWilliams; 21 Jeff Montgomery; 18 Bret Saberhagen	Catchers: 8 Bob Boone; 15 Mike Macfarlane; Infielders: 5 George Brett; 14 Bill Buckner; 9 Luis de los Santos; 29 Rey Palacios; 32 Bill Pecota; 33 Kevin Seitzer; 1 Kurt Stillwell; 3 Brad Wellman; 20 Frank White	Outfielders: 22 Jim Eisenreich; 16 Bo Jackson; 24 Jeff Schulz; 30 Pat Tabler; 4 Danny Tartabull; 25 Gary Thurman; 6 Willie Wilson; 17 Matt Winters	Manager: 12 John Wathan; Coaches: 44 Glenn Ezell (bullpen); 43 Frank Funk (pitching); 41 Adrian Garrett (third base); 28 Mike Lum (hitting); 7 John Mayberry (bench); 42 Bob Schaefer (first base)

== Player stats ==
= Indicates team leader

=== Batting ===
==== Starters by position ====
Note: Pos = Position; G = Games played; AB = At bats; H = Hits; Avg. = Batting average; HR = Home runs; RBI = Runs batted in

Pos	Player	G	AB	H	Avg.	HR	RBI
C	Bob Boone	131	405	111	.274	1	43
1B	George Brett	124	457	129	.282	12	80
2B	Frank White	135	418	107	.256	2	36
3B	Kevin Seitzer	160	597	168	.281	4	48
SS	Kurt Stillwell	130	463	121	.261	7	54
LF	Bo Jackson	135	515	132	.256	32	105
CF	Willie Wilson	112	383	97	.253	3	43
RF	Danny Tartabull	133	441	118	.268	18	62
DH	Pat Tabler	123	390	101	.259	2	42

==== Other batters ====
Note: G = Games played; AB = At bats; H = Hits; Avg. = Batting average; HR = Home runs; RBI = Runs batted in

Player	G	AB	H	Avg.	HR	RBI
Jim Eisenreich	134	475	139	.293	9	59
Brad Wellman	103	178	41	.230	2	12
Bill Buckner	79	176	38	.216	1	16
Mike Macfarlane	69	157	35	.223	2	19
Matt Winters	42	107	25	.234	2	9
Gary Thurman	72	87	17	.195	0	5
Luis de los Santos	28	87	22	.253	0	6
Bill Pecota	65	83	17	.205	3	5
Rey Palacios	55	47	8	.170	1	8
Jeff Schulz	7	9	2	.222	0	1

=== Pitching ===
==== Starting pitchers ====
Note: G = Games; IP = Innings pitched; W = Wins; L = Losses; ERA = Earned run average; SO = Strikeouts

Player	G	IP	W	L	ERA	SO
Bret Saberhagen	36	262.1	23	6	2.16	193
Mark Gubicza	36	255.0	15	11	3.04	173
Charlie Leibrandt	33	161.0	5	11	5.14	73
Floyd Bannister	14	75.1	4	1	4.66	35
Stan Clarke	2	7.0	0	2	15.43	2

==== Other pitchers ====
Note: G = Games pitched; IP = Innings pitched; W = Wins; L = Losses; ERA = Earned run average; SO = Strikeouts

Player	G	IP	W	L	ERA	SO
Tom Gordon	49	163.0	17	9	3.64	153
Luis Aquino	34	141.1	6	8	3.50	68
Larry McWilliams	8	32.2	2	2	4.13	24
Kevin Appier	6	21.2	1	4	9.14	10
José DeJesús	3	8.0	0	0	4.50	2

==== Relief pitchers ====
Note: G = Games; W = Wins; L = Losses; SV = Saves; ERA = Earned run average; SO = Strikeouts

Player	G	W	L	SV	ERA	SO
Jeff Montgomery	63	7	3	18	1.37	94
Steve Farr	51	2	5	18	4.12	56
Terry Leach	30	5	6	0	4.15	34
Steve Crawford	25	3	1	0	2.83	33
Rick Luecken	19	2	1	1	3.42	16
Jerry Don Gleaton	15	0	0	0	5.65	9
Bob Buchanan	2	0	0	0	16.20	3

== Awards and honors ==
- Bo Jackson, All-Star Game, American League, Starting Lineup
- Bo Jackson, MLB All-Star Game MVP
- Bret Saberhagen, Cy Young Award

== Farm system ==
Level	Team	League	Manager
AAA	Omaha Royals	American Association	Sal Rende
AA	Memphis Chicks	Southern League	Jeff Cox
A	Baseball City Royals	Florida State League	Luis Silverio
A	Appleton Foxes	Midwest League	Brian Poldberg
A-Short Season	Eugene Emeralds	Northwest League	P. K. Kirsch
Rookie	GCL Royals	Gulf Coast League	Carlos Tosca
