= Larry Owen =

American baseball player (1955-2018)

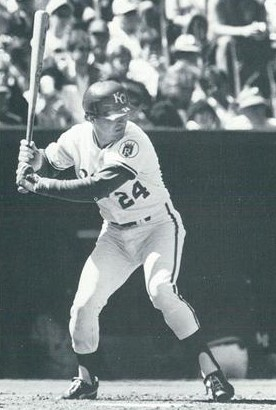
- Catcher
- Born: May 31, 1955; Cleveland, Ohio, U.S.
- Died: June 6, 2018 (aged 63); Westerville, Ohio, U.S.
- Batted: Right Threw: Right

MLB debut
- August 14, 1981, for the Atlanta Braves

Last MLB appearance
- September 25, 1988, for the Kansas City Royals

MLB statistics
- Batting average: .193
- Home runs: 8
- Runs batted in: 30
- Stats at Baseball Reference

Teams
- Atlanta Braves (1981–1983, 1985); Kansas City Royals (1987–1988)

Lawrence Thomas Owen (May 31, 1955 – June 6, 2018) was an American Major League Baseball catcher. He played all or parts of six seasons in the major leagues, between 1981 and 1988, for the Atlanta Braves and Kansas City Royals.

== College ==
Owen played college baseball for Bowling Green. He finished his career with 27 home runs, breaking a conference record held by future Hall of Fame player Mike Schmidt of Ohio University.

== Pro career ==
In 1976, the California Angels drafted Owen in the 18th round of the June draft, but he did not sign with the team. Instead, he opted to continue his career at Bowling Green. The next year, after his senior season, he was drafted by the Atlanta Braves in the 17th round of the June draft and signed with them. Atlanta assigned him to the Greenville Braves of the single A Western Carolina League. In his rookie season of pro ball, Owen batted .282 and drove in 24 runs. The next season, he was promoted to double A, playing for the Savannah Braves. Though his batting average dipped facing tougher competition, Owen hit 11 home runs and drove in 45 runs. Despite his poor average, Owen earned a call up to the Triple A Richmond Braves. He only appeared in a handful of games with Richmond, but still managed to get ten hits and drive in three runs. In 1979, he played the entire season at Richmond, but his batting average did not improve, and in 1980, he found himself back in Double-A ball. Though Owen had home run ability, he struggled to keep his batting aver above the Mendoza Line and he struggled with strikeouts.

On August 14, 1981, Owen made his MLB debut against the Los Angeles Dodgers. He was a late defensive replacement for Bruce Benedict and went hitless, but the Dodgers won 5-0 behind the pitching of Dave Goltz. Over the course of the next several seasons, Owen, once consider a top prospect, would spend his time going bouncing from the minor leagues to the majors, never staying for longer than a handful of games. In 1986, he left the Braves as a free agent. The following spring, he signed with the Kansas City Royals as a free agent, appearing mostly as a backup to Jamie Quirk and Ed Hearn, the latter who had been acquired from the New York Mets. The 1987 season was a tough one for the Royals. Dick Howser, who just two years earlier led them to a World Series championship, died of brain cancer. Billy Gardner, the ex-Twins manager brought in to replace Howser while he sought treatment, was fired mid-season and John Wathan, a star catcher for that championship team, was promoted to replace him.

The next season, Owen bounced between Kansas City and their Triple-A team in Omaha. At the end of the season, the Royals released him outright, in order to make room for top prospect Mike MacFarlane. On September 25, 1988, Owen played his last major game, getting a hit in one at bat versus the Chicago White Sox.

== Personal life ==
In 2002, Owen was elected to the Springfield/Clark County Baseball Hall of Fame.

Owen died on June 6, 2018, at the age of 63.
