= Barry Lyons (baseball) =

American baseball player (born 1960)

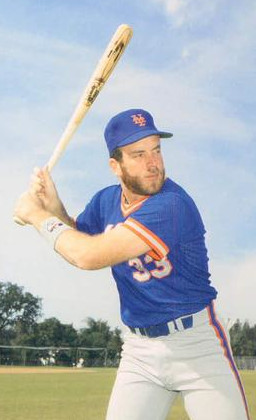
- Lyons in 1986

Lexington Counter Clocks
- Catcher / Manager
- Born: June 3, 1960 (age 65); Biloxi, Mississippi, U.S.
- Batted: Right Threw: Right

MLB debut
- April 19, 1986, for the New York Mets

Last MLB appearance
- October 1, 1995, for the Chicago White Sox

MLB statistics
- Batting average: .239
- Home runs: 15
- Runs batted in: 89
- Stats at Baseball Reference

Teams
- New York Mets (1986–1990); Los Angeles Dodgers (1990–1991); California Angels (1991); Chicago White Sox (1995)

Barry Stephen Lyons (born June 3, 1960) is an American former professional baseball catcher. He played ten seasons in Major League Baseball (MLB) from 1986 to 1995 for the New York Mets, Los Angeles Dodgers, California Angels, and Chicago White Sox.

== Amateur career ==
Lyons was born in Biloxi, Mississippi, graduated from Biloxi High School and attended Delta State University where he was an NCAA All-American catcher. In 1979 and 1981, he played collegiate summer baseball with the Harwich Mariners of the Cape Cod Baseball League and was named a league all-star in 1981. He was taken in the 25th round of the 1981 Major League Baseball draft by the Detroit Tigers but did not sign. He was then taken in the 15th round of the 1982 draft by the Mets and agreed to a contract.

== Early Mets career ==
Lyons came up slowly through the Mets' minor leagues while batting near or above .300 from 1983 to 1986. As a sign of the Mets' coming years of dominance, Lyons was on minor league teams that won championships at the A, AA and AAA levels. Lyons was named the Most Valuable Player of the South Atlantic League in 1984.

Lyons moved one big step down the catching depth chart when the Mets traded for the Montreal Expos' superstar catcher, Gary Carter, before the 1985 season. Lyons spent most of the Mets' 1986 championship season playing for the AAA Tidewater Tides but was brought up to the majors early on. Fellow Tidewater catcher Ed Hearn was also brought up early in 1986 and hit well, pushing Lyons down to third-string. Consequently, Lyons only managed to play in six games, including two starts – all before July – and never got a hit for the eventual World Champions. Despite his lack of playing time, Lyons and a few other rarely used players on that 1986 Mets team eventually received belated World Series rings in 1995, nine years after the series.

== Fighting for a Mets job ==
Ed Hearn was traded to the Kansas City Royals shortly before the 1987 season in a one-sided trade that brought eventual star pitcher David Cone to the Mets. More importantly for Lyons, the trade gave him sole backup duty and he played in 53 games, batting .254 with 24 runs batted in in 1987.

In June 1987, Lyons faced Tom Seaver in a simulated game while Seaver was attempting a comeback. Lyons went 6-for-6 against Seaver and Seaver decided to end his comeback attempt. At his retirement press conference, Seaver said Lyons was the best hitter he ever faced.

On Thursday, August 20, in a day game at Shea Stadium against the San Francisco Giants, Lyons came to bat with his team down 4–3, and hit a grand slam to give the Mets a 7–4 lead, which went on to become the final score.

Lyons was back to sharing backup duties in 1988 and 1989 when the Mets traded for Mackey Sasser. In 1989, the aging Carter missed ten weeks after surgery, giving Lyons a shot at starting, but Lyons soon injured his foot. Sasser used the opportunity to prove himself as a starter. Despite the missed opportunity, Lyons had career highs of 79 games and 235 at bats in 1989 but only managed a .247 average with 27 runs batted in. It was the only season in which he led the team in games caught.

After 1989, the 35-year-old Carter was released, and Lyons was in a two-way battle with Sasser for starting duties. Lyons got most of the starts early in 1990 but hit terribly. Although he was an excellent defensive catcher, always appreciated by the Mets' pitching staff, Sasser was clearly the better hitter and quickly became the regular starter. While Sasser wound up at .307 for 1990, Lyons' sub-.240 average prompted the Mets to release him in early September, and his career was all-but-over at age 30.

== Winding down ==
Between his release and the end of 1991, Lyons played in only fourteen games at the Major League level for the Los Angeles Dodgers and California Angels. He spent the next three seasons exclusively playing AAA level baseball – 1992 with the Houston Astros, 1993 with the St. Louis Cardinals and 1994 with the Cincinnati Reds.

In 1995, Lyons had one last strong showing with the Chicago White Sox. With starting catcher Ron Karkovice hitting under .220, 35-year-old backup Mike LaValliere slowing down and the White Sox essentially out of the postseason hunt, Lyons was given a few starts in August and responded with a six-game hitting streak and the third game of his career with four runs batted in. He continued hitting well and even had the only game with five runs batted in during late September. Lyons played four more games before the season ended and, despite posting career-highs in average (.266), slugging average (.531) and home runs (five), was released by the White Sox in November. He signed with the Texas Rangers but retired without playing again at age 35.

== After retirement ==
Instead of playing for the Rangers in 1996, Lyons became a minor league manager for the next three years. He was the manager of the Cincinnati Reds' A-level Charleston Alley Cats in 1998 when he left the team after being denied a promotion. He then spent three years in Nashville, Tennessee broadcasting for the Nashville Sounds as well as running a baseball academy.

In 2002, Lyons moved back to his hometown of Biloxi and became involved in efforts to bring professional baseball back to Mississippi's coast where no team had played since 1928. In 2004, he was the general manager for the inaugural season of the amateur Cotton State League's Biloxi Breeze.

Lyons was married in the early 1990s and had a daughter in the late 1990s. He, his family and his father as well as his efforts to bring professional baseball to southern Mississippi were severely affected by Hurricane Katrina. The storm devastated the Mississippi coast and Lyons' home in 2005. He and his family rode out the storm and lost their house and memorabilia – including his 1986 World Series ring – but all survived.

Beginning in 2014, Lyons succeeded in bringing Minor League Baseball back to Biloxi. The Milwaukee Brewers AA-affiliate Huntsville Stars relocated to Biloxi and were renamed the Biloxi Shuckers. The Shuckers played their first game in Biloxi on June 6, 2015.

On December 15, 2022, Lyons was announced as the manager of the Lexington Counter Clocks of the Atlantic League of Professional Baseball for the 2023 season.

== Personal life ==
Lyons grew up the youngest of four boys, all star athletes. Injuries ended his brothers' careers, and Barry was the only one who turned professional.

Lyons's first marriage, to his wife Marsha, produced a daughter, but ended in divorce, strained by Lyons's depression, drinking and drug use.

After years of struggling, he went through treatment in 2012, becoming sober and becoming religious, then marrying his second and current wife, Julie, that same year. The couple lives in Biloxi, Mississippi.
