= Derek Schiller =

American baseball executive

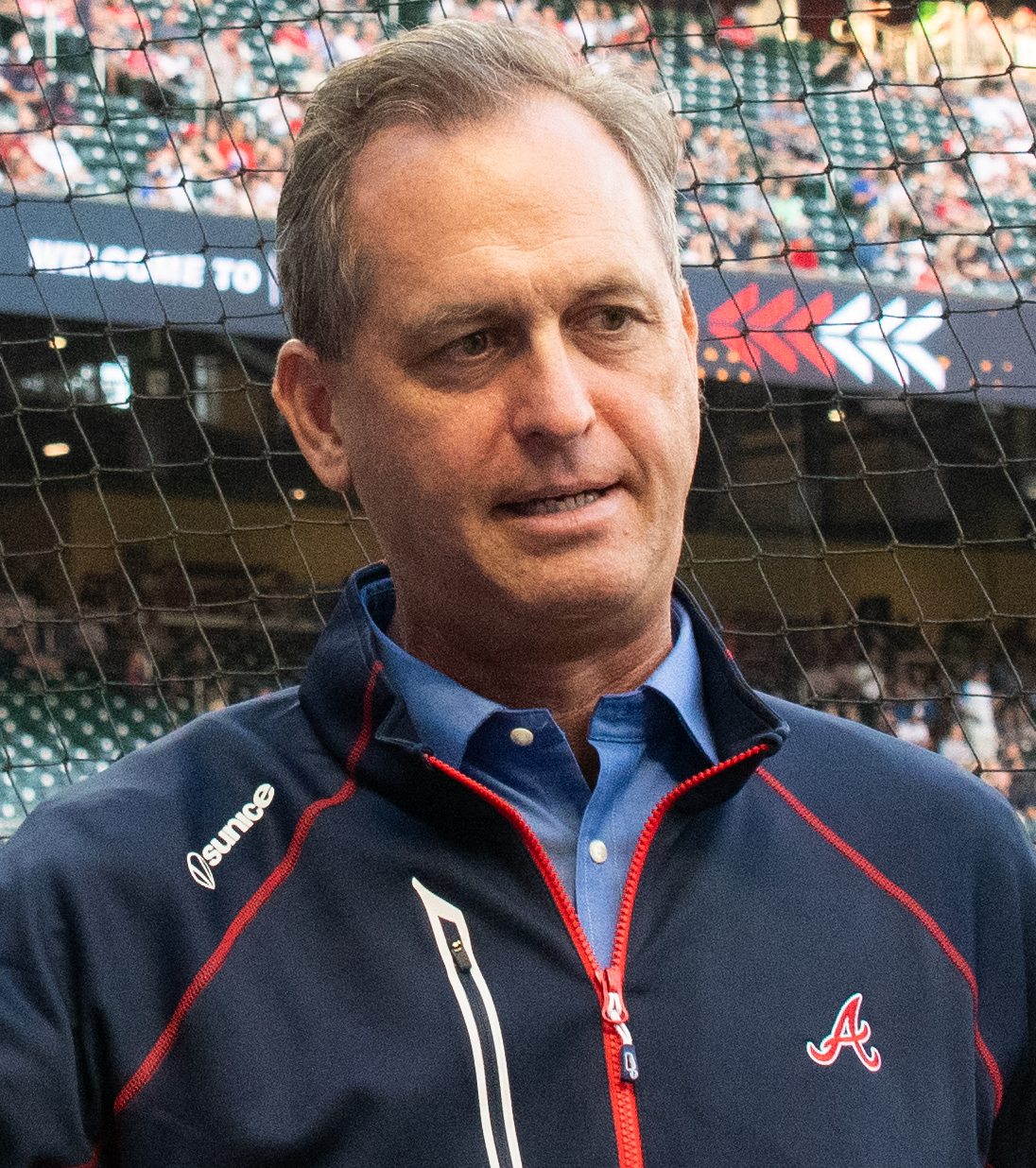
- Schiller at Truist Park in 2023

Atlanta Braves
- President

Teams
- As president: Atlanta Braves (2016–present)

Career highlights and awards
- World Series champion (2021)

Derek Gordon Schiller is an American baseball front office executive. Schiller joined the Atlanta Braves organization in 2003 and has been president since 2016. Schiller was vice president of business development for the New York Yankees from 1996 to 1997.

== Early life ==
Schiller is the son of Harvey and Marcia Schiller. He has a sister, Erika. Schiller grew up in Colorado Springs where his father worked at the United States Air Force Academy. Schiller played ice hockey in high school in Colorado Springs.

Schiller's father was a sports executive who held positions as chair of the United States Olympic Committee, commissioner of the Southeastern Conference, governor of the Atlanta Thrashers and an executive with several other properties owned by Ted Turner including TBS, TNT, the Goodwill Games and World Championship Wrestling.

== Career ==
Derek Schiller graduated from Vanderbilt University with a degree in engineering. Schiller was the director of marketing for the International Sports Plaza in Atlanta during the 1996 Summer Olympics. He held an executive position with the New York Yankees which he left in order to take a position with Atlanta's former National Hockey League franchise, the Atlanta Thrashers.

He joined the Braves in November 2003 as senior vice president of sales and marketing. Terry McGuirk, the Braves president at the time, hired Schiller to address the attendance woes the club was facing despite having a winning team. Schiller was promoted to executive vice president of sales and marketing in August 2007. In 2016, John Schuerholz stepped down as president of the Atlanta Braves and Mike Plant took over as president in charge of development and Schiller became the president overseeing the Braves. In 2018, Schiller, who had been the team’s president of business received a new title of president and chief executive officer of the Braves. He inherited responsibility for the day-to-day oversight of all business functions of the team.

In 2022, Schiller was recognized by the Marietta Daily Journal as the Citizen of the Year. As president of business Schiller is responsible for all forms of revenue within the Braves organization.

== Personal life ==
Schiller married Kristin Lyn Lysaker on September 2, 1995 at a Presbyterian church in State College, Pennsylvania. They live in Atlanta with their two children. He is the son of sports executive Harvey Schiller.

| Preceded by John Schuerholz | Atlanta Braves President; 2016–present | Succeeded by |
