= Jeff Schulz =

American baseball player (born 1961)

- Left fielder/Right fielder
- Born: June 2, 1961 (age 65); Evansville, Indiana, U.S.
- Batted: Left Threw: Right

MLB debut
- September 2, 1989, for the Kansas City Royals

Last MLB appearance
- May 15, 1991, for the Pittsburgh Pirates

MLB statistics
- Batting average: .244
- Home runs: 0
- Runs batted in: 7
- Stats at Baseball Reference

Teams
- Kansas City Royals (1989–1990); Pittsburgh Pirates (1991)

Jeffrey Alan Schulz (born June 2, 1961) is an American former Major League Baseball player.

After playing baseball at the University of Southern Indiana, Schulz was selected by the Kansas City Royals in the 23rd round of the 1983 draft.

Schulz's first major league at bat came on September 2, 1989, as a pinch hitter against Nolan Ryan, baseball's all-time strikeout leader. Ryan had notched his five thousandth career strikeout one month earlier, and after the pitcher recorded two quick strikes on Schulz, he idly wondered what number he would be on Ryan's career total. Instead, however, he delivered a single for his first career hit. All in all, he appeared in seven games that year, collecting two hits and one RBI.

Schulz was not initially expected to make the Royals in 1990, but an April injury to Danny Tartabull created a need for another outfielder, and he ended up appearing in 30 games for them that season. He posted a .258 batting average over 66 at bats.

The Royals released Schulz after the end of the season, and he signed with the Pittsburgh Pirates as a free agent. In his final major league action, Schulz made three appearances with the Pirates at midseason. He became a free agent at year's end and signed with the Cincinnati Reds for the 1992 season, but was not called up that year.

Schulz was in camp with the Royals as a replacement player during spring training in 1995. If the 1994 Major League Baseball strike had not been settled before the season was scheduled to begin, he would likely have entered the season as Kansas City's starting right fielder.
