= Terry McGuirk =

American baseball executive

Terry McGuirk is the chairman of Major League Baseball's Atlanta Braves. Since graduating from Middlebury College in 1973, McGuirk has also been with Turner Broadcasting System, where he was CEO from 1996 to 2001 and is now vice chairman.

As chairman of the Atlanta Braves, McGuirk oversaw the development of and move to Truist Park and an "astounding" 47 percent revenue increase in 2017.

Preceded by Stan Kasten	Atlanta Braves President; 2003–2007	Succeeded by John Schuerholz
