= John Schuerholz =

American baseball executive (born 1940)

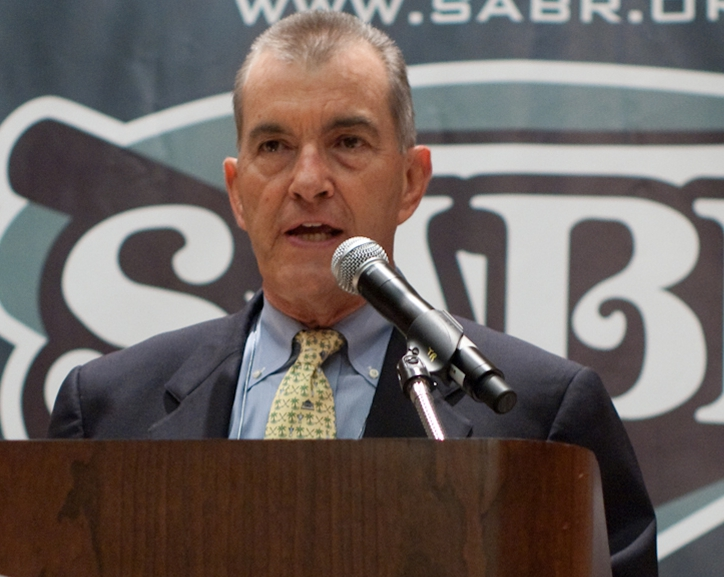
- Schuerholz in 2010
- General manager / Executive
- Born: October 1, 1940 (age 86); Baltimore, Maryland, U.S.

Teams
- As general manager: Kansas City Royals (1981–1990); Atlanta Braves (1990–2007); As president: Atlanta Braves (2007–2016)

Career highlights and awards
- 2× World Series champion (1985, 1995); Sporting News Executive of the Year (1985); Braves Hall of Fame; Kansas City Royals Hall of Fame

Member of the National

Baseball Hall of Fame
- Induction: 2017
- Vote: 100%
- Election method: Today's Game Era Committee

John Boland Schuerholz Jr. (/ˈʃɜːrhɒlts/; born October 1, 1940) is an American baseball front office executive. He was the general manager of Major League Baseball's Atlanta Braves from 1990 to 2007, and then served as the Braves president for a decade from 2007 until 2016. Before joining Atlanta, he spent 22 years with the Kansas City Royals organization, including nine (1982–1990) as the club's general manager. Among the teams he built are the 1985 Royals and 1995 Braves, both World Series champions. His teams have also won their division 16 times, including 14 consecutive times in Atlanta. During his time with the Braves, they won five National League pennants and played in nine National League Championship series. He was inducted into the Baseball Hall of Fame in 2017.

== Personal life ==
Schuerholz was born in Baltimore, the son of John Schuerholz Sr., who played in the Philadelphia Athletics minor league system from 1937 to 1940. He is a graduate of the Baltimore City College High School, Towson University and Loyola University. While at Towson, Schuerholz applied for officer candidate school and was rejected, as he was partially deaf. Before his career in baseball, Schuerholz was a teacher at North Point Junior High in Baltimore. Upon leaving his teaching job, he was drafted by the United States Army to serve in the Vietnam War. After entering Major League Baseball with the Baltimore Orioles, Schuerholz joined the United States Army Reserve.

He donated $250,000 to Towson in 1999. This money was used to upgrade the school's baseball facility, which was named after Schuerholz.

Schuerholz's son, Jonathan Schuerholz, was selected by Atlanta in the eighth round of the 2002 MLB draft and played in the minor leagues until 2007. Jonathan retired from baseball in August 2007 to go back to Auburn University to complete his business degree. The younger Schuerholz, who finished his six-year career in the minor leagues with a .223 batting average, was named manager of the Rome Braves (Atlanta's Class-A minor league affiliate) in 2014. After the season, Jonathan was reassigned to the Braves front office to serve as an assistant player-development director.

== Career ==
The Baltimore Orioles hired Schuerholz in 1966 as a result of a letter Schuerholz wrote to team owner Jerold Hoffberger. Schuerholz worked under Frank Cashen, Harry Dalton, and Lou Gorman. In 1969, Major League Baseball expanded to Kansas City. Gorman and Schuerholz left for the Royals. Schuerholz was named general manager of the Royals during the 1981 offseason, and became Major League Baseball's youngest general manager at the time. Schuerholz built a strong relationship with Royals owner Ewing Kauffman, but left the team as it began to struggle. He joined the Braves in 1990, succeeding Bobby Cox who returned to the dugout to manage the team. The duo of Schuerholz and Cox produced an unprecedented run of success for the franchise, highlighted by the 1995 World Series Championship. On October 11, 2007, Schuerholz resigned as the Atlanta Braves general manager, but was promoted to club president, replacing Terry McGuirk. Schuerholz's top assistant Frank Wren was named the general manager. When Schuerholz stepped down as club president in March 2016, his duties were split between Derek Schiller, as president of business, and Mike Plant, as president of development.

Schuerholz has sent many assistants to general manager positions around the league, including Wren and Braves former GM John Coppolella. Dayton Moore, the Braves' former director of scouting and assistant GM under Schuerholz, was the GM of the Kansas City Royals from 2006 to 2021 and won a World Series in 2015, he replaced Allard Baird.

In 2006, Schuerholz published a book, Built To Win, which chronicled his tenure with the Braves and some of his most important moves as a GM. Included in his book is a trade the Braves almost made with the Pirates in 1992. Had the deal gone through the Braves would have sent pitcher Alejandro Pena and outfielder Keith Mitchell to the Pirates in exchange for Barry Bonds.

On December 4, 2016, Schuerholz was elected to the National Baseball Hall of Fame and Museum. He was formally inducted on July 30, 2017.

=== Record as general manager ===
Team	Year	Regular season					Postseason			
Team	Year	Games	Won	Lost	Win %	Finish	Won	Lost	Win %	Result
KC	1982	162	90	72	.556	2nd in AL West	–	–	–	–
KC	1983	162	79	83	.488	2nd in AL West	–	–	–	–
KC	1984	162	84	78	.519	1st in AL West	0	3	.000	Lost ALCS (DET)
KC	1985	162	91	71	.562	1st in AL West	8	6	.571	Won World Series (STL)
KC	1986	162	76	86	.469	3rd in AL West	–	–	–	–
KC	1987	162	83	79	.512	2nd in AL West	–	–	–	–
KC	1988	161	84	77	.522	3rd in AL West	–	–	–	–
KC	1989	162	92	70	.568	2nd in AL West	–	–	–	–
KC	1990	161	75	86	.466	6th in AL West	–	–	–	–
KC total		1,456	754	702	.518		8	9	.471	
ATL	1991	162	94	68	.580	1st in NL West	7	7	.500	Lost World Series (MIN)
ATL	1992	162	98	64	.605	1st in NL West	6	7	.462	Lost World Series (TOR)
ATL	1993	162	104	58	.642	1st in NL West	2	4	.333	Lost NLCS (PHI)
ATL	1994	114	68	46	.596	2nd in NL East	–	–	–	–
ATL	1995	144	90	54	.625	1st in NL East	11	3	.786	Won World Series (CLE)
ATL	1996	162	96	66	.593	1st in NL East	9	7	.563	Lost World Series (NYY)
ATL	1997	162	101	61	.623	1st in NL East	5	4	.556	Lost NLCS (FLA)
ATL	1998	162	106	56	.654	1st in NL East	5	4	.556	Lost NLCS (SD)
ATL	1999	162	103	59	.636	1st in NL East	7	7	.500	Lost World Series (NYY)
ATL	2000	162	95	67	.586	1st in NL East	0	3	.000	Lost NLDS (STL)
ATL	2001	162	88	74	.543	1st in NL East	4	4	.500	Lost NLCS (ARI)
ATL	2002	160	101	59	.631	1st in NL East	2	3	.400	Lost NLDS (SF)
ATL	2003	162	101	61	.623	1st in NL East	2	3	.400	Lost NLDS (CHC)
ATL	2004	162	96	66	.593	1st in NL East	2	3	.400	Lost NLDS (HOU)
ATL	2005	162	90	72	.556	1st in NL East	1	3	.250	Lost NLDS (HOU)
ATL	2006	162	79	83	.488	3rd in NL East	–	–	–	–
ATL	2007	162	84	78	.519	3rd in NL East	–	–	–	–
ATL total		2,686	1,594	1,092	.593		63	62	.504	
Total		4,142	2,348	1,794	.567		71	71	.500	

== Awards and honors ==
In 2019, Schuerholz was named a Georgia Trustee by the Georgia Historical Society, in conjunction with the Office of the Governor of Georgia, to recognize accomplishments and community service that reflect the ideals of the founding body of Trustees, which governed the Georgia colony from 1732 to 1752.

Sporting positions
Preceded by Joe Burke	Kansas City Royals General Manager; 1981–1990	Succeeded by Herk Robinson
Preceded by Bobby Cox	Atlanta Braves General Manager; 1990–2007	Succeeded by Frank Wren
Preceded by Terry McGuirk	Atlanta Braves President; 2007–2016	Succeeded by Derek Schiller
Awards
Preceded by Dallas Green	Sporting News Major League Baseball Executive of the Year; 1985	Succeeded by Frank Cashen
