= Rick Anderson (pitcher/coach) =

American baseball player & coach (born 1956)

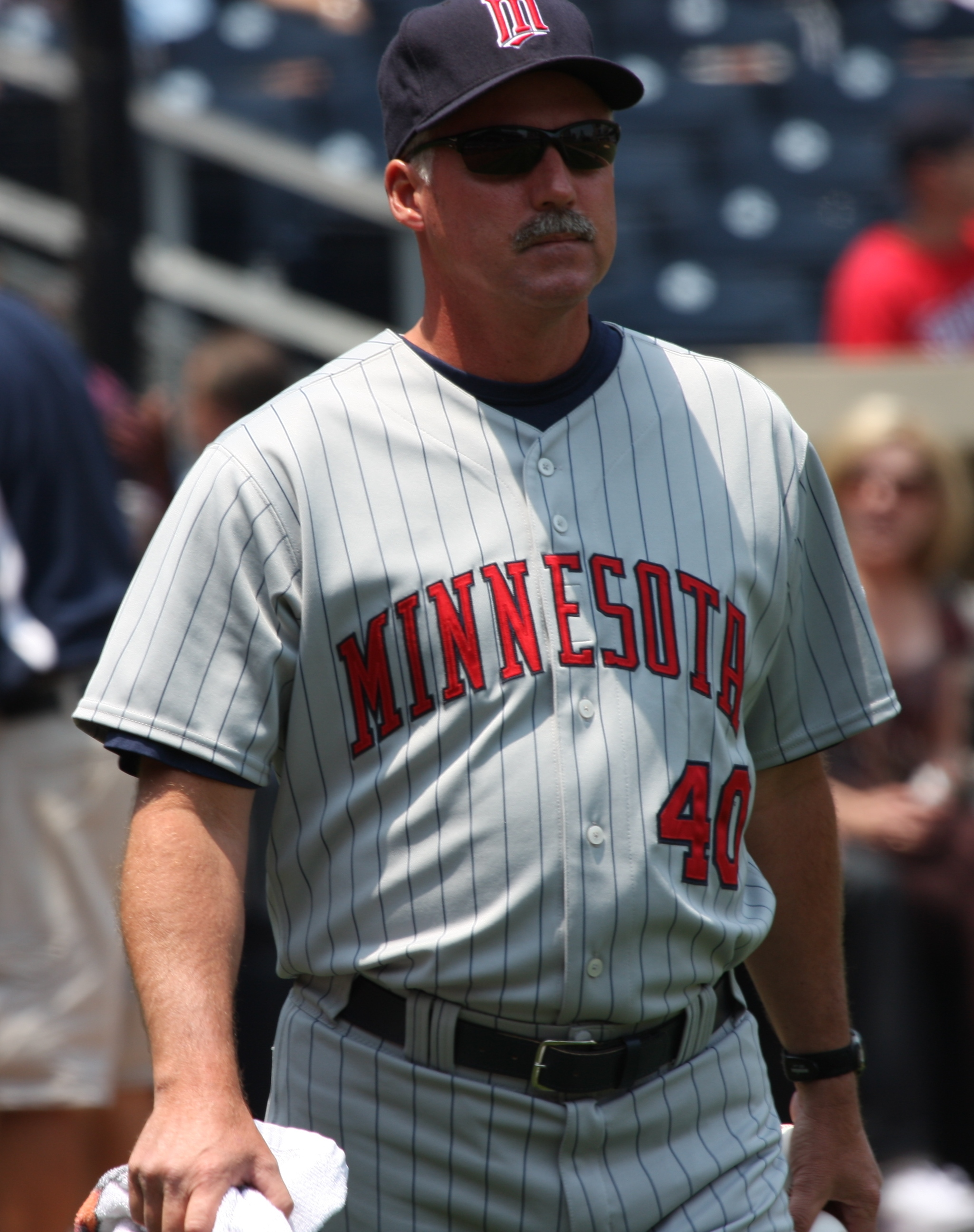
- Anderson in 2008
- Pitcher
- Born: November 29, 1956 (age 69); Everett, Washington, U.S.
- Batted: Right Threw: Right

MLB debut
- June 9, 1986, for the New York Mets

Last MLB appearance
- July 28, 1988, for the Kansas City Royals

MLB statistics
- Win–loss record: 4–4
- Earned run average: 4.75
- Strikeouts: 42
- Stats at Baseball Reference

Teams
- As player: New York Mets (1986); Kansas City Royals (1987–1988); As coach: Minnesota Twins (2002–2014); Detroit Tigers (2018–2020)

Richard Arlen Anderson (born November 29, 1956) is an American former professional baseball pitcher and coach. He played for the New York Mets and Kansas City Royals of Major League Baseball (MLB) from 1986 to 1988. He served as the pitching coach for the Minnesota Twins and Detroit Tigers of MLB from 2002 to 2020.

== Amateur career ==
Anderson attended the University of Washington, where he played college baseball for the Huskies in 1978.

== New York Mets ==
Anderson was drafted in the 24th round (580th overall) of the 1978 Major League Baseball draft out of the University of Washington by the New York Mets.

Anderson would see mediocre results in the minors, finishing with a 60–51 record over parts of 11 minor league seasons, as he possessed only average stuff and struck out an extremely low average of 3.5 batters per nine innings. Despite this, he would be promoted to Triple-A Tidewater at the end of the 1980 season. Anderson would spend the next six seasons shuttling between Double-A Jackson and Tidewater, being continually passed up for promotion to the majors while more promising prospects (such as future all-stars Dwight Gooden, Sid Fernandez, Ron Darling, Rick Aguilera, Randy Myers, and Roger McDowell) debuted with the big club.

After pleading "All I want is one chance to prove myself" to Mets assistant general manager Joe McIlvaine prior to the 1986 season, Anderson's wish was granted. He made his major league debut on June 9 against the Philadelphia Phillies, pitching seven innings and allowing only one unearned run while striking out five in a no-decision. His first win came on August 6, in the second game of a double header against the Chicago Cubs. For the season, Anderson went 2–1 with a 2.72 earned run average and one save in 15 games (five starts). Pitching rich in 1986, Anderson was left off the Mets' postseason roster and was only able to celebrate their eventual World Series championship as a spectator on the bench.

== Kansas City Royals ==
On March 27, 1987, Anderson was traded to the Kansas City Royals, along with Mets backup catcher Ed Hearn and minor league pitcher Mauro Gozzo, for future star pitcher David Cone and minor league outfielder Chris Jelic. In retrospect, with the all-star career of Cone and the journeyman careers of Anderson, Hearn, and Gozzo, this trade is often listed as one of the most lopsided in major league history. Anderson split two seasons between Kansas City and AAA Omaha, going 2–3 with a 6.89 ERA at the major league level, before retiring following the 1988 season.

== Coaching career ==
After retiring, Anderson accepted a job as pitching coach for the Gulf Coast League Twins.

After thirteen seasons as a minor league coach, the last seven at the AAA level, he was named the Minnesota Twins' pitching coach for the 2002 season, where he coached with former Met, and minor league roommate, Twins' manager Ron Gardenhire. From 2002 to 2010, Twins pitchers posted the third-lowest ERA in the American League, at 4.11. Anderson's philosophy for the pitching staff was to pitch to contact and limit walks in order to win. Consequently, no major league team was more stingy with free passes. For instance, from 2008 to 2010, the Twins issued 1,255 walks; the St. Louis Cardinals were a distant second on that list, at 1,433. In fact, from 2003, Anderson's second year, through 2010, the Twins issued the least or second least walks every season, although in the preceding six seasons (1997-2002, Anderson's first season and the five preceding seasons), they were no worse than the fifth least walks allowed. From 2011 to 2014, they ranged from fifth to eleventh fewest free passes.

On October 2, 2014, following the termination of Gardenhire, it was announced that Anderson would not be returning as the Twins pitching coach.

On November 2, 2017, Anderson was named the bullpen coach for the Detroit Tigers for the 2018 season. On June 27, 2018, Anderson was promoted to pitching coach for the Tigers, following the firing of Chris Bosio.

== Personal life ==
Anderson graduated from Mariner High School in 1975 and attended Everett Community College before graduating from the University of Washington. He and his wife have three children.
