= Mike Macfarlane =

American baseball player (born 1964)

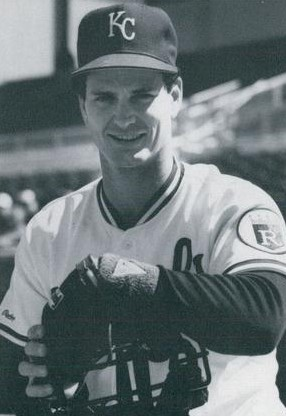
- Catcher
- Born: April 12, 1964 (age 62); Stockton, California, U.S.
- Batted: Right Threw: Right

MLB debut
- July 23, 1987, for the Kansas City Royals

Last MLB appearance
- October 3, 1999, for the Oakland Athletics

MLB statistics
- Batting average: .252
- Home runs: 129
- Runs batted in: 514
- Stats at Baseball Reference

Teams
- Kansas City Royals (1987–1994); Boston Red Sox (1995); Kansas City Royals (1996–1998); Oakland Athletics (1998–1999)

Michael Andrew Macfarlane (born April 12, 1964) is an American former professional baseball player. He played as a catcher in Major League Baseball for the Kansas City Royals (1987–1994, 1996–1998), Boston Red Sox (1995), and Oakland Athletics (1998–1999).

== Early life ==
Macfarlane graduated from Lincoln High School in Stockton, California, in 1982. He played collegiate baseball for Santa Clara University before his selection in the fourth round (97th overall) of the 1985 draft.

== Career ==
In 1988, Macfarlane became the first Royals rookie catcher to start on Opening Day since Ellie Rodríguez in 1969. In 1992, he led Kansas City with 17 home runs and a .445 slugging percentage. In 1994, he became the Royals leader in all-time games caught, surpassing a club record set by John Wathan.

In a 13-season major league career, Macfarlane posted a .252 batting average with 129 home runs and 514 runs batted in in 1,164 games played. He is ranked 64th all-time among American League catchers with a .992 fielding percentage while throwing out 33% of potential basestealers. His 97 hit by pitches ranks him 100th on the MLB all-time list.

== Post-career activities ==
In 1996, Macfarlane co-founded Mac-N-Seitz Baseball Academy with Kevin Seitzer. Among the academy's former players is Ryne Stanek. After his retirement in 1999, Macfarlane became a pitching coach. He created a new pitching grip, the Kansas City Knuckle-Curve, which became popular in the area. He taught the pitch to future MLB pitcher Riley Pint.

In 2014, Macfarlane was inducted into the Missouri Sports Hall of Fame.
