= Gary Thurman =

American baseball player (born 1964)

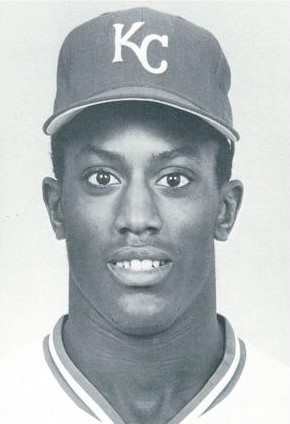
- Outfielder
- Born: November 12, 1964 (age 61); Indianapolis, Indiana, U.S.
- Batted: Right Threw: Right

MLB debut
- August 30, 1987, for the Kansas City Royals

Last MLB appearance
- May 26, 1997, for the New York Mets

MLB statistics
- Batting average: .243
- Home runs: 2
- Runs batted in: 64
- Stats at Baseball Reference

Teams
- Kansas City Royals (1987–1992); Detroit Tigers (1993); Seattle Mariners (1995); New York Mets (1997)

Gary Montez Thurman (born November 12, 1964) is an American former professional baseball outfielder. He played for nine seasons in Major League Baseball (MLB) for the Kansas City Royals, Detroit Tigers, Seattle Mariners, and New York Mets. He later coached several MLB teams.

The Royals selected Thurman in the first round with the 21st pick of the 1983 MLB draft out of North Central High School in Indianapolis, Indiana. He played his first professional season with their rookie-league Gulf Coast Royals in 1983 and his last with the Los Angeles Angels of Anaheim's Triple-A affiliate, the Vancouver Canadians, in 1998. In the minors, he led his league in stolen bases in 1985 and 1987.

Thurman reached MLB with Kansas City in August 1987. Also serving as a pinch runner, he had a career-high 16 stolen bases in 1989 and was not caught once, for the best stolen bases percentage in the majors that season. He had his first three-hit game and scored the lone run in a 1–0 win over the Minnesota Twins in September 1990. He hit his only two MLB home runs in 1991 but tore a knee ligament in August. He played in a career-best 88 games in 1992.

The Tigers claimed him off waivers in late March 1993. After spending the 1994 season in the Chicago White Sox minor league system, he signed with the Mariners for 1995. He signed with the Mets after the season, returning to the majors for the final time in 1997. He ended his playing career in the minors in the Montreal Expos and Angels organizations, also playing for the independent Newark Bears.

After his playing career, Thurman held various coaching, managing, and instructional roles. He was named the Arizona League manager of the year in 1999 with the Arizona League Mariners. He managed the 2001 Wisconsin Timber Rattlers and 2006 Inland Empire 66ers to the minors league playoffs. In 2007, he served as first base coach for the Mariners for the second half of the season. He was the coordinator of base running for the Cleveland Indians during 2008–2011. He was the first base coach for the Miami Marlins in 2012. He was the outfield and base running coordinator for the Washington Nationals beginning in 2017.

== Personal life ==
Thurman and his wife have four children.

Thurman played football in high school and committed to play college football for the Purdue Boilermakers.
