= John Wathan =

American baseball player and manager (born 1949)

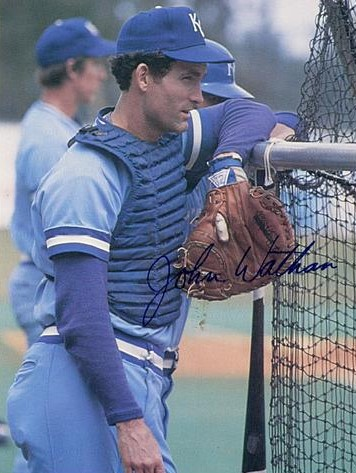
- Catcher / Manager
- Born: October 4, 1949 (age 76); Cedar Rapids, Iowa, U.S.
- Batted: Right Threw: Right

MLB debut
- May 26, 1976, for the Kansas City Royals

Last MLB appearance
- October 6, 1985, for the Kansas City Royals

MLB statistics
- Batting average: .262
- Home runs: 21
- Runs batted in: 261
- Managerial record: 326–320
- Winning %: .505
- Stats at Baseball Reference

Teams
- As player: Kansas City Royals (1976–1985); As manager: Kansas City Royals (1987–1991) (Note: Took over as interim manager in 1987 after Billy Gardner was fired 106 games into the season.); California Angels (1992); As coach: Kansas City Royals (1986); California Angels (1992–1993); Boston Red Sox (1994)

Career highlights and awards
- World Series champion (1985); Kansas City Royals Hall of Fame
Medals
Men's baseball
Representing United States
Amateur World Series
Silver medal – second place	1970 Cartagena	Team

John David Wathan (/ˈwɒθən/; born October 4, 1949) is an American former professional baseball catcher, manager, and coach. He played his entire career in Major League Baseball (MLB) for the Kansas City Royals from 1976 to 1985. Wathan was a member of the world champion 1985 Kansas City Royals team.

After his playing career, he worked as a coach before serving as the Royals manager from 1987 to 1991. He also managed the California Angels in 1992. Wathan is notable for setting the single-season stolen base record for catchers in 1982 when, he stole 36 bases to break the previous record set by Ray Schalk in 1916.

== Baseball career ==
Wathan, nicknamed "The Duke" for his dead-on impersonations of John Wayne, was drafted in the first round, fourth overall, in the 1971 MLB draft from the University of San Diego, where he played college baseball for the Toreros in 1968–70.

Wathan played ten seasons with the Royals from 1976 to 1985 where he played in 860 games, averaging a career .262 batting average with 21 home runs, 261 RBIs, and 105 stolen bases. Wathan had his best season in 1980 in which he played in 126 games, and had a .305 batting average with 6 home runs and 58 RBI.

After he retired, Wathan coached for the Royals in 1986 before becoming the manager of Kansas City's AAA Omaha Royals farm club. He was promoted to manager for the big-league Royals on August 28, 1987. He managed five seasons in Kansas City, having two winning seasons in 1988 and 1989 and finishing second in the American League West both times. He was fired early in the 1991 season after a 15–22 start.

In 1992, Wathan began the season as the third-base coach of the California Angels, but he was named acting manager midway through the campaign when Buck Rodgers was badly hurt in a bus accident and took a medical leave of absence. Wathan led the Angels to a 39–50 record until Rodgers was well enough to return. He spent 1994 as a Boston Red Sox coach, worked as a color analyst on Royals telecasts in 1996 and 1997, and has worked as a scout and minor league instructor for a number of organizations since. In 2006-07, Wathan was a roving baserunning and bunting instructor in Kansas City's farm system, and in 2008 he served the Royals as a special assistant to the director of player development.

Two of John's sons, Derek and Dusty, played professional baseball. Derek played minor league baseball from 1998 to 2008, while Dusty played briefly for the Royals in 2002 and is the current bench coach for the Philadelphia Phillies.

== Managerial records ==
Team	Year	Regular season					Postseason			
Team	Year	Games	Won	Lost	Win %	Finish	Won	Lost	Win %	Result
KC	1987	36	21	15	.583	2nd in AL West	–	–	–	–
KC	1988	162	84	77	.522	3rd in AL West	–	–	–	–
KC	1989	162	92	70	.568	2nd in AL West	–	–	–	–
KC	1990	161	75	86	.466	6th in AL West	–	–	–	–
KC	1991	37	15	22	.405	(fired)	–	–	–	–
KC total		557	287	270	.515		0	0	–	
CAL	1992	89	39	50	.438	5th in AL West	–	–	–	–
CAL total		89	39	50	.438		0	0	–	
Total		646	326	320	.505		0	0	–	

== See also ==
- List of Major League Baseball players who spent their entire career with one franchise
