= Kevin Seitzer =

American baseball player & coach (born 1962)

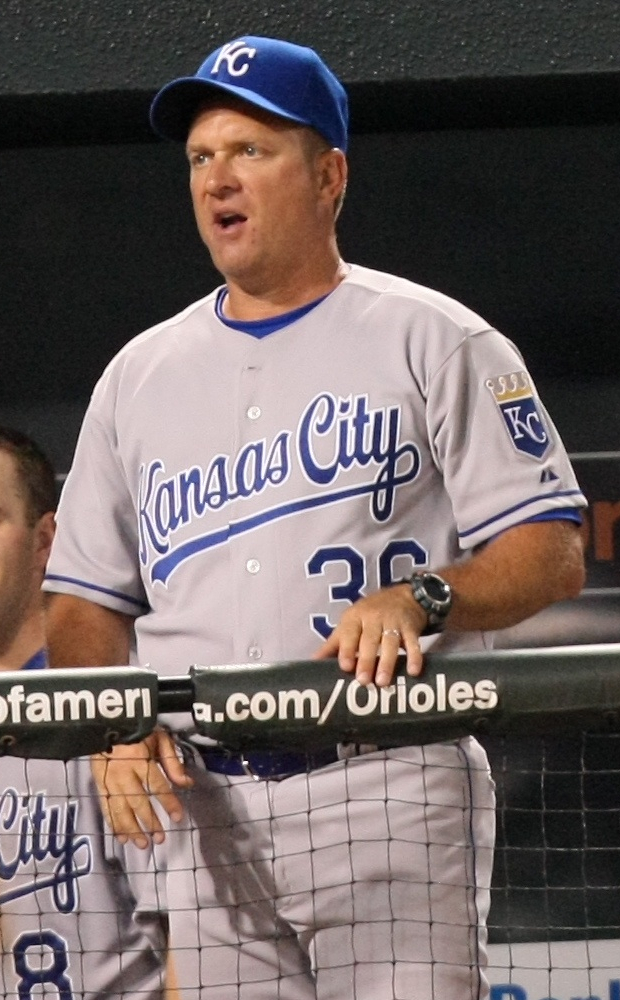
- Seitzer with the Kansas City Royals in 2009
- Third baseman
- Born: March 26, 1962 (age 64); Springfield, Illinois, U.S.
- Batted: Right Threw: Right

MLB debut
- September 3, 1986, for the Kansas City Royals

Last MLB appearance
- September 28, 1997, for the Cleveland Indians

MLB statistics
- Batting average: .295
- Home runs: 74
- Runs batted in: 613
- Stats at Baseball Reference

Teams
- As a player: Kansas City Royals (1986–1991); Milwaukee Brewers (1992); Oakland Athletics (1993); Milwaukee Brewers (1993–1996); Cleveland Indians (1996–1997); As a coach: Arizona Diamondbacks (2007); Kansas City Royals (2009–2012); Toronto Blue Jays (2014); Atlanta Braves (2015–2024); Seattle Mariners (2025–2026)

Career highlights and awards
- 2× All-Star (1987, 1995); World Series champion (2021); Milwaukee Brewers Wall of Honor

Kevin Lee Seitzer (/ˈsaɪtsər/; born March 26, 1962) is an American former professional baseball third baseman and hitting coach. He played in Major League Baseball (MLB) for the Kansas City Royals, Milwaukee Brewers, Oakland Athletics, and Cleveland Indians. He has also served as the hitting coach for the Royals, Arizona Diamondbacks, Toronto Blue Jays, Atlanta Braves and Seattle Mariners.

== Playing career ==
After starring at Eastern Illinois University, Seitzer was drafted by the Royals in the 11th round of the 1983 draft. Seitzer made his big-league debut as a September call-up in 1986 with the Royals. He made it to the majors to stay in 1987, where he started the season as the Royals' regular first baseman. He traded positions with Hall of Fame third baseman George Brett later in the season, in hopes of reducing Brett's chances of injury. Seitzer hit .323 with 15 home runs and 207 hits (tying the MLB record) in his rookie 1987 season and, though overshadowed by fellow rookie teammate Bo Jackson, he was selected to the American League All-Star team.

Seitzer also became one of only (currently) three Royals to collect six hits in a nine-inning game, which he did on August 2 of that year in a 13–5 victory over the Boston Red Sox at Royals Stadium; two of those hits were home runs. He also had seven RBI for the day, a single-game career high. He joined Bob Oliver in 1969 (the franchise's inaugural season) in accomplishing this feat; Joe Randa would join them in 2004. Seitzer finished the 1987 season as the runner-up for the American League Rookie of the Year award, behind the Oakland A's Mark McGwire. He holds Royal rookie records in games (161), hits (207), singles (151) and walks (80) and is tied with Carlos Beltrán in extra-base hits (56) and total bases (301). He led the league in hits, singles and plate appearances (725). He ranks eighth on the Royals all-time list with 369 walks while his .380 career on-base percentage as a Royals is second all-time. He is one of six players in Royals history to top the 200 hits mark in a season (207 in 1987). He appeared in the postseason twice with the Indians in 1996 and 1997, appearing in the 1997 World Series for the Tribe against Florida.

After subsequent seasons of .304, .281, .275, and .265, the Royals released Seitzer during spring training in 1992. He signed with Milwaukee, who installed him as their regular third baseman. In 1993 Seitzer became a free agent, signed with Oakland and after a slow start was released at the All Star break that season. He then resigned with Milwaukee, solidified himself as an everyday player, and again made the All-Star team in 1995. He enjoyed what many feel was his best season in 1996 with the Brewers and Cleveland Indians. Seitzer batted .326 with 13 home runs and 78 RBI in '96 while posting a career-high .416 on-base percentage.

In two postseason appearances with Cleveland, mostly coming off the bench, he hit .192 with a double, one run scored and four runs batted in. He retired following the 1997 season with a career batting average of .295.

During the final years of his career, Seitzer wore an attachment to his batting helmet called a C-flap which was an extra piece of plastic attached to the ear flap that covered the left side of his jaw. He was forced to wear this protection after being hit in the face twice by a pitch; once in 1994 and again in 1995. The helmet evidently did not obscure his batting eye, as he wore it for the rest of his career.

== Coaching career ==
On October 27, 2006, Seitzer was named hitting coach of the Arizona Diamondbacks. Seitzer was replaced by Rick Schu on July 11, 2007, as the Diamondbacks' hitting coach. On February 7, 2009, Seitzer was named hitting coach of the Kansas City Royals. On October 4, 2012, the Royals announced Seitzer's contract would not be renewed.

Seitzer was hired by the Toronto Blue Jays to be their hitting coach on October 31, 2013. He joined the Atlanta Braves in the same role on October 27, 2014. On October 10, 2024, the Braves announced that Seitzer would not return for the 2025 season.

On November 25, 2024, Seitzer was hired by the Seattle Mariners to serve as the team's hitting coach.

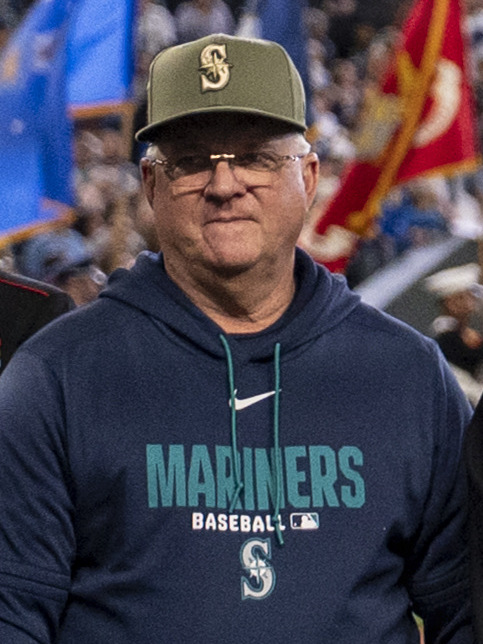
Seitzer with the Mariners in 2026

== High school and college highlights ==
- In 1992, Seitzer was inducted into the Eastern Illinois University Athletics Hall of Fame.
- Seitzer was a member of Lincoln Community High School's fourth-place finish (Lincoln, Illinois) in the 1980 Class AA Illinois High School Association basketball tournament. He scored 46 points in four games in the tournament.
- in 1981 Seitzer played for Galesburg, Illinois in the Central Illinois Collegiate League.
- In 1982 Seitzer played collegiate summer baseball for the Chatham A's of the Cape Cod Baseball League, and won the championship that summer.
- In 1983 Seitzer played for the Butte Copper Kings (Montana) of the Pioneer League. The Copper Kings were affiliated with the Kansas City Royals.
- In 2012 Seitzer had his number retired by Eastern Illinois University.

== Personal life ==
Seitzer and his wife reside in Loch Lloyd, Missouri. They have four sons, three grandsons, and one granddaughter. His stepson Nick Graffeo was drafted as a pitcher by the Kansas City Royals in the 2010 MLB draft, then was released in March 2013, by the Royals. Seitzer's son Cameron was an infielder in the Chicago White Sox organization from 2011 to 2018; he is now a hitting coach for the Charlotte Knights.

Seitzer owned and operated a baseball and softball training facility in Kansas City, Missouri, called Mac-N-Seitz Baseball and Softball with former Royals teammate Mike Macfarlane.

== See also ==
- List of Major League Baseball single-game hits leaders
