= David Cone =

American baseball player and analyst (born 1963)

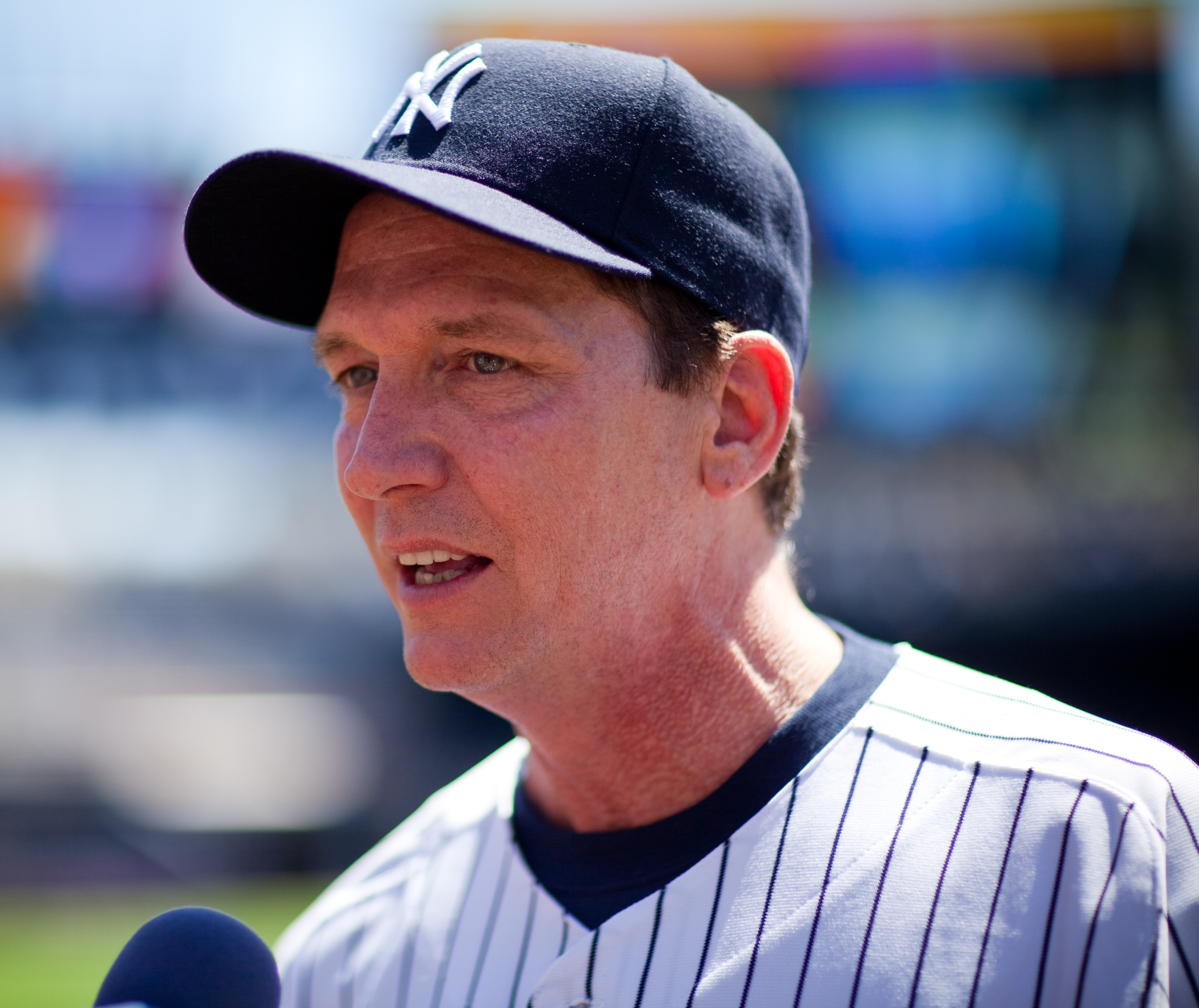
- Cone in 2009
- Pitcher
- Born: January 2, 1963 (age 63); Kansas City, Missouri, U.S.
- Batted: Left Threw: Right

MLB debut
- June 8, 1986, for the Kansas City Royals

Last MLB appearance
- May 28, 2003, for the New York Mets

MLB statistics
- Win–loss record: 194–126
- Earned run average: 3.46
- Strikeouts: 2,688
- Stats at Baseball Reference

Teams
- Kansas City Royals (1986); New York Mets (1987–1992); Toronto Blue Jays (1992); Kansas City Royals (1993–1994); Toronto Blue Jays (1995); New York Yankees (1995–2000); Boston Red Sox (2001); New York Mets (2003)

Career highlights and awards
- 5× All-Star (1988, 1992, 1994, 1997, 1999); 5× World Series champion (1992, 1996, 1998–2000); AL Cy Young Award (1994); MLB wins leader (1998); 3× MLB strikeout leader (1990–1992); Pitched a perfect game on July 18, 1999

David Brian Cone (born January 2, 1963) is an American former Major League Baseball (MLB) pitcher, and current color commentator for the New York Yankees on the YES Network and Amazon Prime as well as for ESPN on Sunday Night Baseball. A third round draft pick of the Kansas City Royals in the 1981 MLB draft, he made his MLB debut in 1986 and continued playing until 2003, pitching for five different teams. Cone batted left-handed and threw right-handed.

On the final game of the 1991 regular season, Cone struck out 19 batters, tied for second-most ever in a game. Renowned for his split-finger fastball, Cone won the 1994 American League Cy Young Award, was a five-time All-Star and led the major leagues in strikeouts each season from 1990 to 1992. He was a two-time 20 game-winner, setting the MLB record for most years between 20-win seasons with 10. Cone pitched the sixteenth perfect game in baseball history in 1999.

He was a member of five World Series championship teams: 1992 with the Toronto Blue Jays and 1996, 1998, 1999 and 2000 with the New York Yankees. His 8–3 career postseason record came over 21 games and 111 innings pitched, with an earned run average (ERA) of 3.80; in World Series play, his ERA was 2.12.

Cone is the subject of the book A Pitcher's Story: Innings With David Cone, by Roger Angell. Cone and Jack Curry co-wrote the autobiography Full Count: The Education of a Pitcher, which was released in May 2019 and made The New York Times Best Seller list shortly after its release.

== Early years ==
Cone was born in Kansas City, Missouri, the son of Joan (née Curran; 1936–2016) and Edwin Cone (1934–2022). He attended Rockhurst High School, a Jesuit school, where he played quarterback on the football team, leading them to the district championship. He was also a point guard on the basketball team. Because Rockhurst did not have a baseball team, Cone instead played summer ball in the Ban Johnson League, a college summer league in Kansas City. At 16, he reported to an invitation-only tryout at Royals Stadium and an open tryout for the St. Louis Cardinals. He was also recruited to play college football and baseball. Upon graduation, he enrolled at the University of Missouri and was drafted by his hometown Kansas City Royals in the third round of the 1981 Major League Baseball draft.

== Professional baseball career ==
=== Minor leagues and MLB debut: Kansas City Royals (1981–1986) ===
Cone went 22–7 with a 2.21 earned run average in his first two professional seasons. He sat out 1983 with an injury, and went 8–12 with a 4.28 ERA for the Double-A Memphis Chicks when he returned in 1984. During his second season with the Class AAA Omaha Royals (1986), Cone was converted to a relief pitcher, and he made his Major League debut on June 8, 1986, in relief of reigning Cy Young Award winner Bret Saberhagen. He made three more appearances out of the Royals' bullpen before returning to Omaha, where he went 8–4 with a 2.79 ERA. He returned to Kansas City when rosters expanded that September.

=== New York Mets (1987–1992) ===
Prior to the 1987 season, Cone was traded with Chris Jelic to the New York Mets for Ed Hearn, Rick Anderson and Mauro Gozzo. Cone went 5–6 with a 3.71 ERA and 68 strikeouts in 21 appearances (13 starts) his first season in New York City.

Cone began the 1988 season in the bullpen, but was added to the starting rotation by the first week of May. His first start was a complete game shutout over the Atlanta Braves, and he went on to post a 9–2 record with a 2.52 ERA in the first half of the season to earn his first All-Star nod. For the season, Cone went 20–3 with a 2.22 ERA to finish third in National League Cy Young Award balloting.

The Mets ran away with the National League East by fifteen games over the Pittsburgh Pirates, and were heavy favorites over the Los Angeles Dodgers, against whom they had a 10–1 record during the regular season, in the 1988 National League Championship Series.

Cone became a newspaper commentator on the playoffs for the New York Daily News, and incited controversy after the Mets' 3–2 victory in game one by saying Dodgers game one starter Orel Hershiser "was lucky for eight innings", and ripping closer Jay Howell:

We saw Howell throwing curveball after curveball and we were thinking: This is the Dodgers' idea of a stopper? Our idea is Randy (Myers), a guy who can blow you away with his heat. Seeing Howell and his curveball reminded us of a high school pitcher.

After Cone provided the Dodgers with bulletin board material, Los Angeles jumped on Cone for five runs in two innings in the second game of the playoffs to tie the series at a game apiece. The Mets persuaded Cone to stop writing the column, and he came back with a scoreless ninth inning in a Game 3 Mets win and a complete-game victory in Game 6; however, series MVP and 1988 Cy Young Award winner Orel Hershiser came back in game seven with the complete game shutout to lead the Dodgers to the 1988 World Series against the Oakland Athletics.

In a well-known incident on April 30, 1990, against the Atlanta Braves, Cone covered first base on a throw from second baseman Gregg Jefferies, which should have retired batter Mark Lemke. Umpire Charlie Williams mistakenly ruled Lemke safe. Arguing with Williams, and thinking time had been called, Cone held the ball while two Braves runners (Dale Murphy and Ernie Whitt) scored.

Cone spent over five seasons in his first stint with the New York Mets, most of the time serving as the team's co-ace alongside Dwight Gooden while leading the National League in strikeouts in 1990 and 1991. In 1991, Cone switched from uniform number 44 to 17 in honor of former teammate Keith Hernandez. On August 30, he struck out all three batters on nine total pitches in the fifth inning of a 3–2 win over the Cincinnati Reds, becoming the 16th National League pitcher and the 25th pitcher in major-league history to accomplish an immaculate inning.

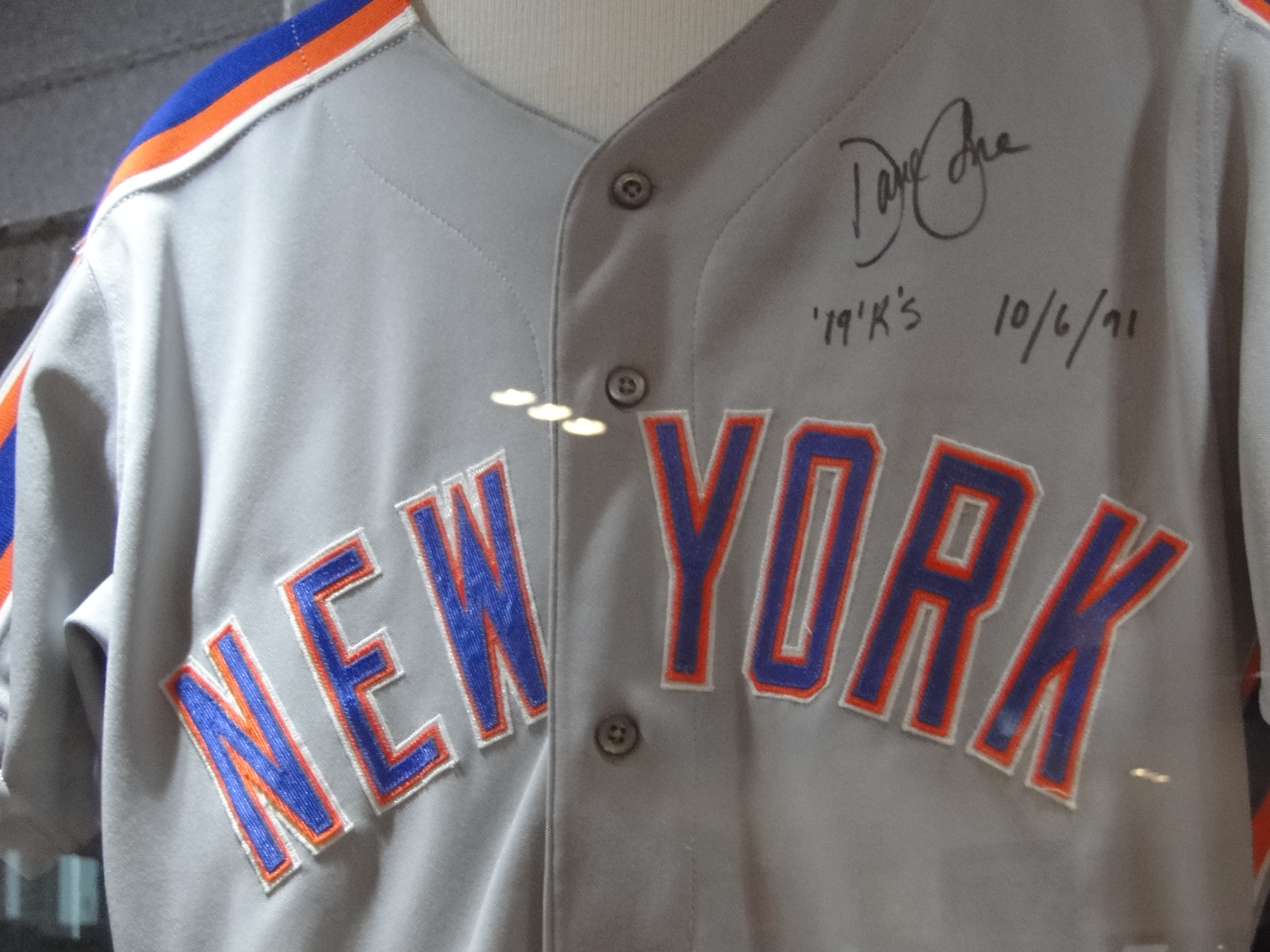
Cone's jersey from his 19 strikeout game on October 6, housed in the Mets Hall of Fame and Museum at Citi Field

Cone tied a National League record on October 6, in the season finale, by striking out 19 rival Philadelphia Phillies batters in a 7–0, three-hit shutout at Philadelphia. His 19 strikeouts was the second-highest total ever recorded in a nine-inning game just behind the 20-strikeout games recorded by Kerry Wood, Roger Clemens (twice), Randy Johnson and Max Scherzer, and tying Tom Seaver's single-game club record, making the Mets the only team with two pitchers to achieve the feat.

Cone was the lone Mets representative at the 1992 Major League Baseball All-Star Game, going 9–4 with a 2.56 ERA at the All-Star break. With a 56–67 record, and fourteen games behind the first place Pirates, the infamous "worst team money could buy" traded Cone to the Toronto Blue Jays for Jeff Kent and Ryan Thompson on August 27, 1992, after the non-waiver trading deadline.

=== Toronto Blue Jays (1992) ===
With Toronto, Cone was 4–3 with a 2.55 ERA and 47 strikeouts. Combined with the 214 strikeouts he had with the Mets, his 261 strikeouts led the major leagues and were career-highs. Cone headed to the postseason for the second time in his career as the Blue Jays won the American League East. The Jays defeated the Oakland Athletics in the 1992 American League Championship Series, and the Atlanta Braves in the World Series, to give Cone his first World Series ring, and become the first Canadian team to win the World Series. For his part, Cone went 1–1 with a 3.22 ERA in the postseason.

=== Kansas City Royals (1993–1994) ===
Cone returned to his hometown Kansas City Royals as a free agent for the 1993 season. Despite an 11–14 record, Cone had an impressive 1993, pitching 254 innings with a 3.33 ERA, and a 138 ERA+. He improved to go 16–5 with a 2.94 ERA (171 ERA+) in the strike-shortened 1994 season to win the American League Cy Young Award, and finish ninth in MVP voting. Cone was a Major League Baseball Players Association representative in negotiations with Major League Baseball in events that surrounded the 1994 baseball strike.

=== Toronto Blue Jays (1995) ===
Four days after the strike ended, the Royals traded Cone back to the Blue Jays, in exchange for Chris Stynes, David Sinnes and Tony Medrano. Cone was 9–6 with a 3.38 ERA for Toronto, however, the Jays were 35–47 and in fifth place when they struck a deal with the second-place New York Yankees. On July 28, 1995, the Blue Jays sent Cone to the Yankees for Marty Janzen, Jason Jarvis and Mike Gordon.

=== New York Yankees (1995–2000) ===
When the Yankees acquired Cone, they were on a six-game winning streak, though still trailing the Boston Red Sox for the division lead. Cone instantly became the team's ace and would post a 9–2 record as the Yankees won the wild card in the first season of the new three division, wild card format. In his third postseason, Cone won the first game of the 1995 American League Division Series against the Seattle Mariners, and left game five with the score tied at four. The Mariners won the game in extra innings to eliminate the Yankees from the playoffs.

The Yankees re-signed Cone in the offseason to a three-year contract worth $19.5 million. Cone was 4–1 with a 2.02 ERA when he was diagnosed with an aneurysm in his arm in 1996 and went on the disabled list for the majority of the year. In his comeback start that September against the Oakland Athletics, Cone pitched a no-hitter through seven innings before he had to leave due to pitch count restrictions. Mariano Rivera allowed an infield single, ending the no-hit bid.

The Yankees returned to the postseason for the second consecutive season. After losing to the Texas Rangers in game one of the 1996 American League Division Series, and a no decision in the 1996 American League Championship Series, Cone came back in game three of the World Series against the Atlanta Braves with a six inning, one run performance to give the Yankees their first win of the Series on their way to their first World Championship in eighteen years.

Cone went 20–7 in 1998, setting a Major League record for the longest span between twenty-win seasons at 11, surpassing the record of 8 set by Jim Kaat in 1974. Cone won the 1998 American League Division Series clinching game against the Rangers, the 1998 American League Championship Series clinching game against the Indians, and Game Three of the 1998 World Series against the San Diego Padres. Cone finished fourth in the AL Cy Young voting.

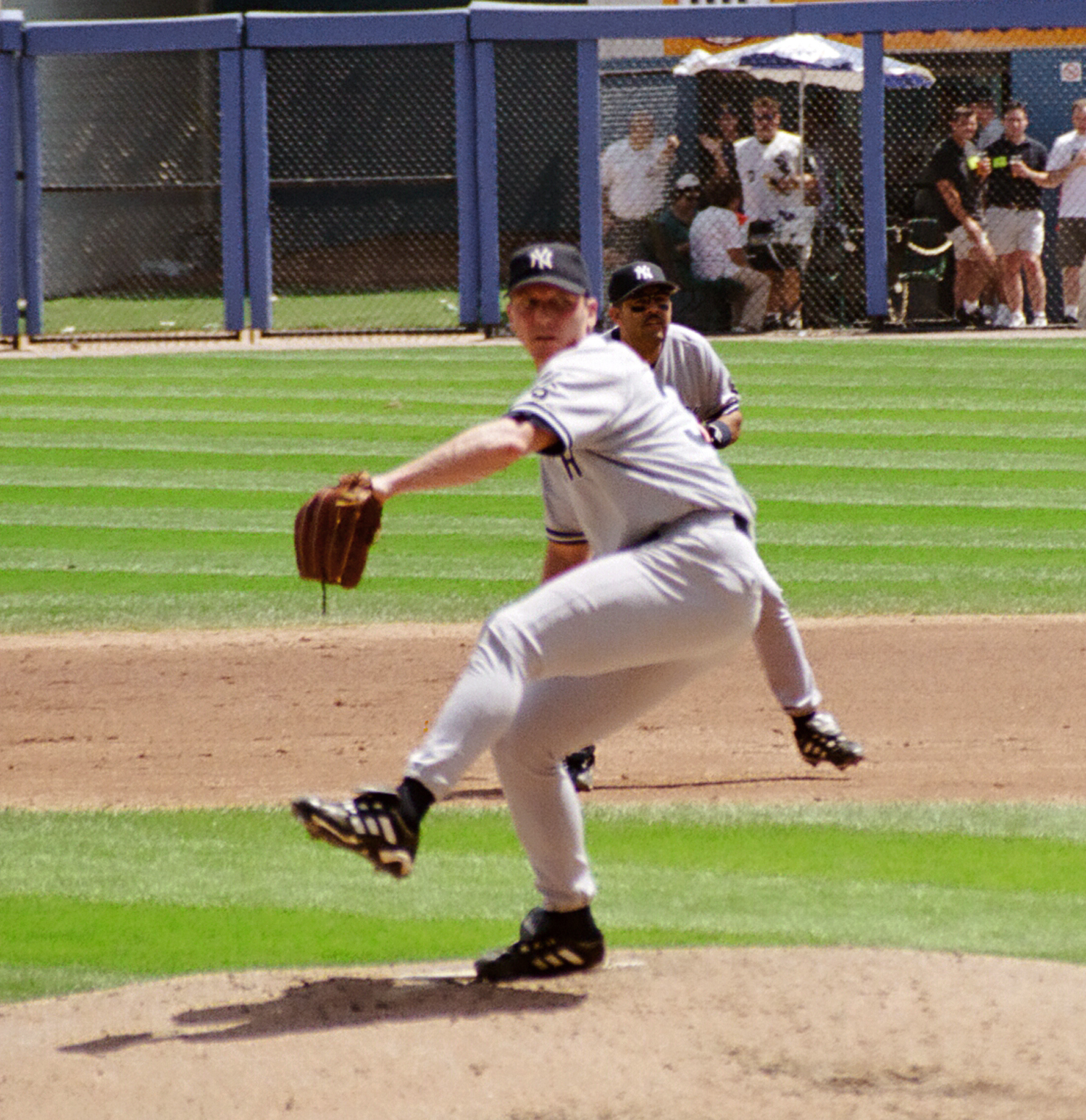
Cone pitching on July 29, 1999

He re-signed with the Yankees for the 1999 season for $8 million. He went 12–9 in 1999, pitching the sixteenth perfect game in baseball history on July 18 against the Montreal Expos. It was the last no-hitter by a Yankee until 2021, and also the first in a regular season interleague perfect game. Making the game even more remarkable was that it was "Yogi Berra Day" at Yankee Stadium. After a long feud with owner George Steinbrenner, Berra agreed to return to the stadium that day. Yogi caught the ceremonial first pitch from Don Larsen, who threw a perfect game for the Yankees in the 1956 World Series; that game had been caught by Yogi Berra. Larsen could be seen smiling in the press box after the final out of Cone's perfect game was recorded. After the game, Cone was met at his clubhouse locker by Larsen and Berra, who together wrapped him in a bear hug.

After the perfect game, he seemed to suddenly lose effectiveness. It was the last shutout he would throw in his career. In 2000, he posted the worst record of his career, 4–14, while seeing his ERA balloon to 6.91, more than double his mark the previous year. In spite of his ineffectiveness, Cone was brought in during game four of the 2000 World Series to face the Mets' Mike Piazza, a controversial decision at the time—Denny Neagle had given up a home run to Piazza in his previous at-bat, but was pitching with a lead and only needed to retire Piazza to go the minimum five innings to be eligible for a win. Cone induced a pop-up to end the inning. It was the only batter he faced in the entire Series.

=== Boston Red Sox (2001) ===
Cone recognized after the 2000 season that his tenure with the Yankees was over. In 2001 Cone pitched for the rival Boston Red Sox, performing with mixed but mostly positive results, including a 9–7 win–loss record and a 4.31 ERA. His 2001 season included a suspenseful 1–0 loss against Yankees ace Mike Mussina wherein Cone pitched 8 1/3 innings giving up one unearned run, keeping the game close even as Mike Mussina came within one strike of completing a perfect game, which would have made Cone the first pitcher to pitch a perfect game and be the losing pitcher in another.

=== Comeback with New York Mets (2003) ===
Cone sat out the 2002 season, but attempted a comeback with the Mets in 2003. Cone went 1–3 in four starts for the Mets with a 6.50 ERA. He announced his retirement soon after his last appearance for the Mets on May 28, citing a chronic hip problem.

=== Pitching style ===
Cone modeled his pitching after Luis Tiant. By emulating Tiant's pitching style, it helped him conserve his arm. The drawback is that it put much wear and tear on his hips.

=== Career statistics ===
Cone's .606 won-lost percentage ranks 95th on MLB all-time list; 7.77 hits allowed per nine innings pitched ranks 60th on MLB's all-time list; 8.28 strikeouts per nine innings pitched ranks 17th; 2,668 strikeouts ranks 21st, and 419 games started ranks 97th on the MLB all-time list. Cone:

- Is the New York Yankees' all-time leader in strikeouts per 9 innings pitched (8.67).
- Holds the New York Yankees' single-season record for most strikeouts per 9 innings pitched (10.25 in 1997).
- Struck out 19 batters in one game, October 6, 1991.
- Is the only pitcher to have a 20-win season with both the Mets (1988) and the Yankees (1998).

== Post-playing career ==
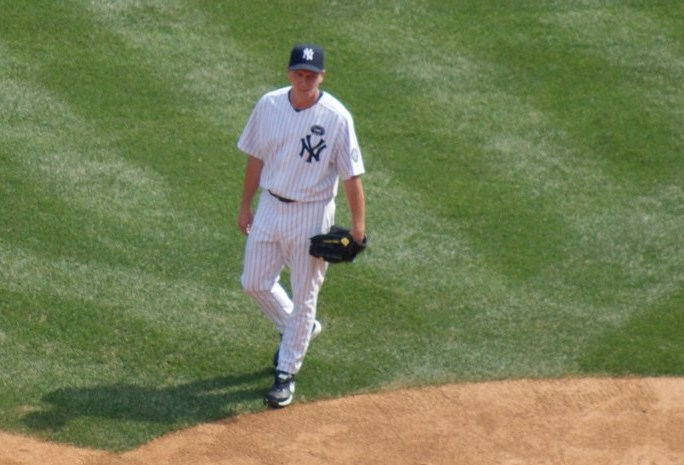
Cone pitching at Yankee Stadium during the 2010 Old-Timers' Day

Upon retiring from baseball in 2001, Cone became a color commentator on the YES Network during its inaugural season. However, his comeback attempt with the crosstown rival Mets in 2003 annoyed Yankees owner George Steinbrenner and Cone was told he would not be welcomed back. After his second retirement from baseball, Cone was offered a broadcasting position with the Mets, but declined.

In 2008, Cone rejoined the YES Network as an analyst and host of Yankees on Deck. He left the YES Network during the 2009–10 offseason in order to "spend more time with my family". He was replaced by former Yankees first baseman Tino Martinez. On April 19, 2011, Cone returned to the Yankees broadcast booth in Toronto, working as analyst for a Yankees-Blue Jays series along with Ken Singleton. As an announcer, he is known for making references to sabermetric statistics, referencing some websites such as Fangraphs.com. As of 2025, Cone is the Yankees' lead color commentator, alongside former teammate Paul O'Neill. The two are paired with Michael Kay as the Yankees' regular broadcast team.

After the 2021 season, Cone began co-hosting the podcast "Toeing the Slab" with Justin Shackil for Jomboy Media. In 2022, Cone was announced to be part of the Sunday Night Baseball broadcast team on ESPN along with Karl Ravech, Eduardo Pérez, and Buster Olney.

On July 17, 2009, Cone testified as a witness (representing the Democratic Party) before the Senate Judiciary Committee during the Supreme Court nomination hearings for Judge Sonia Sotomayor. Cone read a prepared statement in support of Sotomayor's nomination which chronicled Major League Baseball's labor dispute of 1994 and the impact of the judge's decision which forced the disputants back to the bargaining table. Cone said, "It can be a good thing to have a judge in district court or a justice on the United States Supreme Court who recognizes that the law cannot always be separated from the realities involved in the disputes being decided."

== Personal life ==
During his career in New York, Cone was known for his embrace of the city's nightlife. He was falsely accused of rape in 1991, but within 72 hours the police found the claim to be without merit. In 1991, three women accused Cone of having threatened their lives at the ballpark. Cone said he had cursed them out for harassing the wife of teammate Sid Fernandez, but never threatened them. The three women later amended their lawsuit against Cone, accusing him of having lured them into the bullpen area at Shea Stadium in 1989 and masturbating in their presence. Two of the women's claims were unsuccessful. One of the women settled her claims out of court based upon Cone calling her a "groupie"; all sexual accusations were dismissed.

Cone married Lynn DiGioia, an interior designer, on November 12, 1994. The couple had a son, Brian, on March 23, 2006. David and Lynn Cone divorced in 2011. Cone's current partner is Taja Abitol, an actress, TV personality of the Netflix show Members Only: Palm Beach, and a wellness pioneer/founder of TajaDrip in the Faena Hotel Miami Beach. The two have a son, Sammy, who was born on December 15, 2011.

== See also ==
- Kansas City Royals award winners and league leaders
- List of athletes who came out of retirement
- List of Major League Baseball career bases on balls allowed leaders
- List of Major League Baseball career hit batsmen leaders
- List of Major League Baseball career strikeout leaders
- List of Major League Baseball no-hitters
- List of Major League Baseball perfect games
- List of Major League Baseball single-game strikeout leaders
- List of New York Yankees no-hitters
- List of people from Kansas City, Missouri
- List of World Series starting pitchers

Awards and achievements
Preceded by José Jiménez	No-hitter pitcher July 18, 1999	Succeeded by Eric Milton
Preceded by David Wells	Perfect game pitcher July 18, 1999	Succeeded by Randy Johnson
Preceded by Orel Hershiser	National League Pitcher of the Month; May 1988	Succeeded by Greg Maddux
Preceded by Ben McDonald; Bartolo Colón	American League Pitcher of the Month; May 1994; July 1998	Succeeded by Cal Eldred; Roger Clemens
