= Ed Hearn (baseball) =

American baseball player (born 1960)

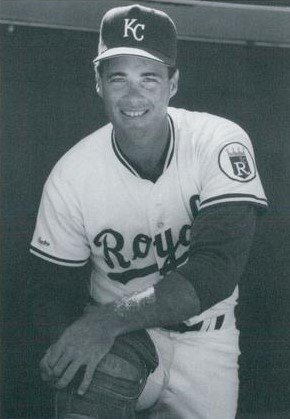
- Catcher
- Born: August 23, 1960 (age 65); Stuart, Florida, U.S.
- Batted: Right Threw: Right

MLB debut
- May 17, 1986, for the New York Mets

Last MLB appearance
- October 2, 1988, for the Kansas City Royals

MLB statistics
- Batting average: .263
- Home runs: 4
- Runs batted in: 14
- Stats at Baseball Reference

Teams
- New York Mets (1986); Kansas City Royals (1987–1988)

Career highlights and awards
- World Series champion (1986)

Edward John Hearn (born August 23, 1960) is an American former professional baseball catcher. He played in Major League Baseball for the New York Mets and Kansas City Royals from 1986 to 1988. He won the 1986 World Series with the Mets.

== Minor leagues ==
Hearn was drafted by the Philadelphia Phillies in the fourth round of the 1978 Major League Baseball draft after attending Fort Pierce Central High School. After four seasons in their organization in which he failed to reach higher than the double A level, he was released by the Phillies on January 7, 1983. However, he was soon signed as a minor league free agent by the New York Mets.

Hearn spent most of 1983 with the Single-A Lynchburg Mets before being promoted to Double-A Jackson, batting .274 with five home runs and 49 runs batted in between the two clubs. In 1984, he led the Jackson Mets with a .312 batting average and tied for second with eleven home runs. He earned his promotion to Triple-A in 1985, spending the whole season with the International League's Tidewater Tides.

== New York Mets ==
Hearn began the 1986 season in Tidewater when Barry Lyons won the back-up catcher job out of spring training. Manager Davey Johnson, however, reversed that decision in early May, and Hearn made his major league debut with the Mets on May 17 against the Los Angeles Dodgers at Dodger Stadium. He went two for three with a single and a double off Bob Welch, and caught Greg Brock, who had stolen a base off him in the third inning, stealing in the seventh.

While Hearn was on the Mets' World Series roster, he was the only player to not make a post-season appearance, as the backup to future Hall of Famer Gary Carter during the teams' 1986 season. He appeared in the team's 1986 music video "Let's Go Mets Go".

== Cone trade ==
On March 27, 1987, the Mets traded Hearn, reliever Rick Anderson, and minor league pitcher Mauro Gozzo to the Kansas City Royals for pitcher David Cone and minor league outfielder Chris Jelic.

Hearn was on the Royals' opening day roster, and was slated to be the starting catcher in 1987 until a serious shoulder injury ended his season only nine games into it. After rehabbing his injury, Hearn spent the 1988 season playing in the Florida State League. He returned to the majors when rosters expanded in September, going 4-for-18 in seven games. On September 29, he had a walk off extra innings pinch hit off the Chicago White Sox's Donn Pall.

Hearn spent the entire 1989 season with the Omaha Royals, slashing .281/.328/.325, and was released at the end of the season. For his career, Hearn only appeared in thirteen games over two seasons for the Royals, batting .257 with no home runs and four runs batted in. In retrospect, with Hearns' injury riddled career and the journeyman careers of Anderson and Gozzo versus the All-star career of Cone, this trade is often listed as one of the most lop-sided in major league history.

Hearn spent 1990 season in the Cleveland Indians' organization. He split the season between the double A Canton-Akron Indians & triple A Colorado Springs Sky Sox. At season's end, he retired from baseball.

== Personal life ==
Expecting to spend his retirement selling insurance in Overland Park, Kansas, in 1992 Hearn was diagnosed with focal segmental glomerulosclerosis. Hearn immediately underwent a kidney transplant and was required to take several types of medication on a daily basis. Due to the debilitating effects of the disease, and mood swings caused by the medication, in 1993 Hearn almost committed suicide, but was able to fight his way past it through faith and a chance request for him to give a motivational seminar.

Finding a renewed strength, Hearn struggled on despite being treated for skin cancer twice, undergoing two more kidney transplants, and being diagnosed with sleep apnea (requiring mechanical assistance to breathe while sleeping) - all of which forces him to take more than fifty types of medication on a daily basis.

Hearn currently works as a motivational speaker. In 2001, Hearn was awarded the prestigious Certified Speaking Profession designation from the National Speakers Association. He is the first and only professional athlete to receive this designation (only 8% of speakers throughout the world have received this distinguished honor).

Hearn also operates a charity: the Bottom of the Ninth Foundation, which is a mentorship program for children.

Hearn has written an autobiography entitled Conquering Life’s Curves – Baseball, Battles & Beyond. He resides in Shawnee, Kansas with his wife, Trish and son, Cody.
