= 1990 Milwaukee Brewers season =

1990 Milwaukee Brewers
- League: American League
- Division: East
- Ballpark: Milwaukee County Stadium
- City: Milwaukee, Wisconsin, United States
- Record: 74–88 (.457)
- Divisional place: 6th
- Owners: Bud Selig
- General managers: Harry Dalton
- Managers: Tom Trebelhorn
- Television: WCGV-TV (Jim Paschke, Pete Vuckovich)
- Radio: WTMJ (AM) (Bob Uecker, Pat Hughes)

The 1990 Milwaukee Brewers season was the 21st season for the Brewers in Milwaukee, and their 22nd overall. The Brewers finished sixth in the American League East with a record of 74 wins and 88 losses. This was the first season where the players last names appeared on the back of the jerseys, but only for away games. It would be another 3 years before the names appeared on the home jerseys.

== Offseason ==
- October 16, 1989: Joey Meyer was released by the Brewers.
- December 3, 1989: Dave Parker was signed as a free agent by the Brewers.
- December 12, 1989: Terry Francona was signed as a free agent by the Brewers.
- December 19, 1989: Robin Yount was signed as a free agent by the Brewers.

== Regular season ==
- April 9, 1990: Pitcher Tony Fossas threw exactly three pitches and recorded three outs. This was accomplished in the sixth inning.
- July 11, 1990: As part of the celebration of Comiskey Park, the Chicago White Sox played a Turn Back the Clock game against the Brewers. The White Sox wore their 1917 home uniforms. This was the first Turn Back the Clock game in the major leagues and started what has become a popular promotion. The club turned off the electronic scoreboards and public address system. They constructed a special manually operated scoreboard in center field for the day and even the grounds-crew wore period costume. General admission tickets were sold for $0.50, popcorn was a nickel, and the stadium organ was shut down for the game.

=== Season standings ===
AL East
Team	W	L	Pct.	GB	Home	Road
Boston Red Sox	88	74	.543	—	51‍–‍30	37‍–‍44
Toronto Blue Jays	86	76	.531	2	44‍–‍37	42‍–‍39
Detroit Tigers	79	83	.488	9	39‍–‍42	40‍–‍41
Cleveland Indians	77	85	.475	11	41‍–‍40	36‍–‍45
Baltimore Orioles	76	85	.472	11½	40‍–‍40	36‍–‍45
Milwaukee Brewers	74	88	.457	14	39‍–‍42	35‍–‍46
New York Yankees	67	95	.414	21	37‍–‍44	30‍–‍51

=== Record vs. opponents ===
1990 American League record Sources:
Team	BAL	BOS	CAL	CWS	CLE	DET	KC	MIL	MIN	NYY	OAK	SEA	TEX	TOR
Baltimore	—	4–9	7–5	6–6	6–7	6–7	8–3	7–6	6–6	6–7	4–8	3–9	8–4	5–8
Boston	9–4	—	7–5	6–6	9–4	8–5	4–8	5–8	4–8	9–4	4–8	8–4	5–7	10–3
California	5–7	5–7	—	5–8	7–5	5–7	7–6	7–5	9–4	6–6	4–9	5–8	8–5	7–5
Chicago	6–6	6–6	8–5	—	5–7	5–7	9–4	10–2	7–6	10–2	8–5	8–5	7–6	5–7
Cleveland	7–6	4–9	5–7	7–5	—	5–8	6–6	9–4	7–5	5–8	4–8	7–5	7–5	4–9
Detroit	7–6	5–8	7–5	7–5	8–5	—	5–7	3–10	6–6	7–6	6–6	7–5	6–6	5–8
Kansas City	3–8	8–4	6–7	4–9	6–6	7–5	—	4–8	8–5	8–4	4–9	7–6	5–8	5–7
Milwaukee	6–7	8–5	5–7	2–10	4–9	10–3	8–4	—	4–8	6–7	5–7	4–8	5–7	7–6
Minnesota	6–6	8–4	4–9	6–7	5–7	6–6	5–8	8–4	—	6–6	6–7	6–7	5–8	3–9
New York	7–6	4–9	6–6	2–10	8–5	6–7	4–8	7–6	6–6	—	0–12	9–3	3–9	5–8
Oakland	8–4	8–4	9–4	5–8	8–4	6–6	9–4	7–5	7–6	12–0	—	9–4	8–5	7–5
Seattle	9–3	4–8	8–5	5–8	5–7	5–7	6–7	8–4	7–6	3–9	4–9	—	7–6	6–6
Texas	4–8	7–5	5–8	6–7	5–7	6–6	8–5	7–5	8–5	9–3	5–8	6–7	—	7–5
Toronto	8–5	3–10	5–7	7–5	9–4	8–5	7–5	6–7	9–3	8–5	5–7	6–6	5–7	—

=== Notable transactions ===
- April 27, 1990: Terry Francona was released by the Brewers.
- May 23, 1990: Mark Lee was signed as a free agent by the Brewers.
- June 9, 1990: Ron Robinson was traded by the Cincinnati Reds with Bob Sebra to the Milwaukee Brewers for Billy Bates and Glenn Braggs.
- August 30, 1990: Charlie O'Brien and a player to be named later were traded by the Brewers to the New York Mets for players to be named later. The Mets sent completed the deal by sending Julio Machado and Kevin Brown to the Brewers on September 7. The Brewers completed the deal by sending Kevin Carmody (minors) to the Mets on September 11.

=== Roster ===
1990 Milwaukee Brewers
Roster
Pitchers: 38 Don August; 29 Chris Bosio; 30 Kevin Brown; 35 Mike Capel; 32 Chuck Crim; 48 Tom Edens; 35 Narciso Elvira; 29 Tom Filer; 36 Tony Fossas; 49 Teddy Higuera; 41 Mark Knudson; 47 Bill Kreuger; 34 Mark Lee; 14 Julio Machado; 27 Paul Mirabella; 31 Jaime Navarro; 37 Dan Plesac; 21 Dennis Powell; 33 Ron Robinson; 30 Bob Sebra; 43 Randy Veres; 46 Bill Wegman	Catchers: 26 Tim McIntosh; 22 Charlie O'Brien; 5 B. J. Surhoff; Infielders: 34 Billy Bates; 9 Greg Brock; 22 George Canale; 2 Edgar Diaz; 30 Terry Francona; 17 Jim Gantner; 4 Paul Molitor; 39 Dave Parker; 14 Gus Polidor; 11 Gary Sheffield; 6 Bill Spiers; 7 Dale Sveum	Outfielders: 26 Glenn Braggs; 45 Rob Deer; 16 Mike Felder; 24 Darryl Hamilton; 25 Greg Vaughn; 19 Robin Yount	Manager: 42 Tom Trebelhorn; Coaches: 25 Don Baylor (hitting); 50 Ray Burris; 10 Duffy Dyer; 8 Andy Etchebarren; 12 Larry Haney

== Player stats ==
=== Batting ===
==== Starters by position ====
Note: Pos = Position; G = Games played; AB = At bats; H = Hits; Avg. = Batting average; HR = Home runs; RBI = Runs batted in

Pos	Player	G	AB	H	Avg.	HR	RBI
C	B. J. Surhoff	135	474	131	.276	6	59
1B	Greg Brock	123	367	91	.248	7	50
2B	Jim Gantner	88	323	85	.263	0	25
3B	Gary Sheffield	125	487	143	.294	10	67
SS	Bill Spiers	112	363	88	.242	2	36
LF	Greg Vaughn	120	382	84	.220	17	61
CF	Robin Yount	158	587	145	.247	17	77
RF	Rob Deer	134	440	92	.209	27	69
DH	Dave Parker	157	610	176	.289	21	92

==== Other batters ====
Note: G = Games played; AB = At bats; H = Hits; Avg. = Batting average; HR = Home runs; RBI = Runs batted in

Player	G	AB	H	Avg.	HR	RBI
Paul Molitor	103	418	119	.285	12	45
Mike Felder	121	237	65	.274	3	27
Edgar Díaz	86	218	59	.271	0	14
Charlie O'Brien	62	188	44	.234	6	35
Darryl Hamilton	89	156	46	.295	1	18
Dale Sveum	48	117	23	.197	1	12
Glenn Braggs	37	113	28	.248	3	13
Billy Bates	14	29	3	.103	0	2
Gus Polidor	18	15	1	.077	0	0
George Canale	10	13	1	.077	0	0
Tim McIntosh	5	5	1	.200	1	1
Terry Francona	3	4	0	.000	0	0

=== Pitching ===
==== Starting pitchers ====
Note: G = Games pitched; IP = Innings pitched; W = Wins; L = Losses; ERA = Earned run average; SO = Strikeouts

Player	G	IP	W	L	ERA	SO
Teddy Higuera	27	170.0	11	10	3.76	129
Mark Knudson	30	168.1	10	9	4.12	56
Ron Robinson	22	148.1	12	5	2.91	57
Chris Bosio	20	133.0	4	9	4.00	76

==== Other pitchers ====
Note: G = Games pitched; IP = Innings pitched; W = Wins; L = Losses; ERA = Earned run average; SO = Strikeouts

Player	G	IP	W	L	ERA	SO
Jaime Navarro	32	149.1	8	7	4.46	75
Bill Krueger	30	129.0	6	8	3.98	64
Tom Edens	35	89.0	4	5	4.45	40
Dennis Powell	9	39.1	0	4	6.86	23
Bill Wegman	8	29.2	2	2	4.85	20
Tom Filer	7	22.0	2	3	6.14	8
Kevin Brown	5	21.0	1	1	2.57	12

==== Relief pitchers ====
Note: G = Games pitched; W = Wins; L = Losses; SV = Saves; ERA = Earned run average; SO = Strikeouts

Player	G	W	L	SV	ERA	SO
Dan Plesac	66	3	7	24	4.43	65
Chuck Crim	67	3	5	11	3.47	39
Paul Mirabella	44	4	2	0	3.97	28
Tony Fossas	32	2	3	0	6.44	24
Randy Veres	26	0	3	1	3.67	16
Mark Lee	11	1	0	0	2.11	14
Julio Machado	10	0	0	3	0.69	12
Bob Sebra	10	1	2	0	8.18	4
Don August	5	0	3	0	6.55	2
Narciso Elvira	4	0	0	0	5.40	6
Mike Capel	2	0	0	0	135.00	1

== Farm system ==
The Brewers' farm system consisted of seven minor league affiliates in 1990. The Brewers operated a Dominican Summer League team as a co-op with the Toronto Blue Jays. The Stockton Ports won the California League championship, and the AZL Brewers won the Arizona League championship.

Level	Team	League	Manager
Triple-A	Denver Zephyrs	American Association	Dave Machemer
Double-A	El Paso Diablos	Texas League	Dave Huppert
Class A-Advanced	Stockton Ports	California League	Chris Bando
Class A	Beloit Brewers	Midwest League	Rob Derksen
Rookie	Helena Brewers	Pioneer League	Gary Calhoun
Rookie	AZL Brewers	Arizona League	Alex Taveras
Rookie	DSL Brewers/Blue Jays	Dominican Summer League	—
