= 1991 Milwaukee Brewers season =

1991 Milwaukee Brewers
- League: American League
- Division: East
- Ballpark: Milwaukee County Stadium
- City: Milwaukee, Wisconsin, United States
- Record: 83–79 (.512)
- Divisional place: 4th
- Owners: Bud Selig
- General managers: Harry Dalton
- Managers: Tom Trebelhorn
- Television: WCGV-TV (Jim Paschke, Pete Vuckovich)
- Radio: WTMJ (AM) (Bob Uecker, Pat Hughes)

The 1991 Milwaukee Brewers season was the 22nd season for the Brewers in Milwaukee, and their 23rd overall. The Brewers finished fourth in the American League East with a record of 83 wins and 79 losses, after having had a record of 43–60 on August 3

== Offseason ==
- March 14, 1991: Dave Parker was traded by the Brewers to the California Angels for Dante Bichette.

== Regular season ==
=== Season standings ===
AL East
Team	W	L	Pct.	GB	Home	Road
Toronto Blue Jays	91	71	.562	—	46‍–‍35	45‍–‍36
Boston Red Sox	84	78	.519	7	43‍–‍38	41‍–‍40
Detroit Tigers	84	78	.519	7	49‍–‍32	35‍–‍46
Milwaukee Brewers	83	79	.512	8	43‍–‍37	40‍–‍42
New York Yankees	71	91	.438	20	39‍–‍42	32‍–‍49
Baltimore Orioles	67	95	.414	24	33‍–‍48	34‍–‍47
Cleveland Indians	57	105	.352	34	30‍–‍52	27‍–‍53

=== Record vs. opponents ===
1991 American League record Sources:
Team	BAL	BOS	CAL	CWS	CLE	DET	KC	MIL	MIN	NYY	OAK	SEA	TEX	TOR
Baltimore	—	8–5	6–6	4–8	7–6	5–8	4–8	3–10	4–8	5–8	3–9	4–8	9–3	5–8
Boston	5–8	—	4–8	7–5	9–4	5–8	7–5	7–6	3–9	6–7	8–4	9–3	5–7	9–4
California	6–6	8–4	—	8–5	7–5	5–7	9–4	6–6	8–5	6–6	1–12	6–7	5–8	6–6
Chicago	8–4	5–7	5–8	—	6–6	4–8	7–6	7–5	8–5	8–4	7–6	7–6	8–5	7–5
Cleveland	6–7	4–9	5–7	6–6	—	7–6	4–8	5–8	2–10	6–7	5–7	2–10	4–8	1–12
Detroit	8–5	8–5	7–5	8–4	6–7	—	8–4	4–9	4–8	8–5	4–8	8–4	6–6	5–8
Kansas City	8–4	5–7	4–9	6–7	8–4	4–8	—	9–3	6–7	7–5	6–7	7–6	7–6	5–7
Milwaukee	10–3	6–7	6–6	5–7	8–5	9–4	3–9	—	6–6	6–7	8–4	3–9	7–5	6–7
Minnesota	8–4	9–3	5–8	5–8	10–2	8–4	7–6	6–6	—	10–2	8–5	9–4	6–7	4–8
New York	8–5	7–6	6–6	4–8	7–6	5–8	5–7	7–6	2–10	—	6–6	3–9	5–7	6–7
Oakland	9–3	4–8	12–1	6–7	7–5	8–4	7–6	4–8	5–8	6–6	—	6–7	4–9	6–6
Seattle	8–4	3–9	7–6	6–7	10–2	4–8	6–7	9–3	4–9	9–3	7–6	—	5–8	5–7
Texas	3–9	7–5	8–5	5–8	8–4	6–6	6–7	5–7	7–6	7–5	9–4	8–5	—	6–6
Toronto	8–5	4–9	6–6	5–7	12–1	8–5	7–5	7–6	8–4	7–6	6–6	7–5	6–6	—

=== Notable transactions ===
- April 2, 1991: Willie Randolph was signed as a free agent by the Brewers.
- May 25, 1991: Carmelo Castillo was signed as a free agent by the Brewers.
- August 9, 1991: Candy Maldonado was traded by the Brewers to the Toronto Blue Jays for Rob Wishnevski (minors) and a player to be named later. The Blue Jays completed the deal by sending William Suero to the Brewers on August 14.

=== Roster ===
1991 Milwaukee Brewers
Roster
Pitchers: 38 Don August; 47 Jim Austin; 29 Chris Bosio; 20 Kevin Brown; 32 Chuck Crim; 21 Cal Eldred; 59 Chris George; 28 Doug Henry; 49 Teddy Higuera; 40 Darren Holmes; 43 Jim Hunter; 53 Mike Ignasiak; 41 Mark Knudson; 34 Mark Lee; 48 Julio Machado; 31 Jaime Navarro; 45 Edwin Núñez; 37 Dan Plesac; 33 Ron Robinson; 46 Bill Wegman	Catchers: 14 Rick Dempsey; 5 B. J. Surhoff; Infielders: 9 Greg Brock; 22 George Canale; 17 Jim Gantner; 4 Paul Molitor; 30 Willie Randolph; 11 Gary Sheffield; 6,9 Bill Spiers; 28,0 Franklin Stubbs; 7 Dale Sveum	Outfielders: 3 Dante Bichette; 39 Matias Carrillo; 24 Darryl Hamilton; 22 Candy Maldonado; 26 Tim McIntosh; 18 Jim Olander; 23 Greg Vaughn; 19 Robin Yount	Manager: 42 Tom Trebelhorn; Coaches: 25 Don Baylor (hitting); 50 Ray Burris; 10 Duffy Dyer; 8 Andy Etchebarren; 12 Larry Haney; 13 Fred Stanley

== Player stats ==
= Indicates team leader

= Indicates league leader

=== Batting ===
==== Starters by position ====
Note: Pos = Position; G = Games played; AB = At bats; H = Hits; Avg. = Batting average; HR = Home runs; RBI = Runs batted in

Pos	Player	G	AB	H	Avg.	HR	RBI
C	B. J. Surhoff	143	505	146	.289	5	68
1B	Franklin Stubbs	103	362	77	.213	11	38
2B	Willie Randolph	124	431	141	.327	0	54
3B	Jim Gantner	140	526	149	.283	2	47
SS	Bill Spiers	133	414	117	.283	8	54
LF	Greg Vaughn	145	542	132	.244	27	98
CF	Robin Yount	130	503	131	.260	10	77
RF	Dante Bichette	134	445	106	.238	15	59
DH	Paul Molitor	158	665	216	.325	17	75

==== Other batters ====
Note: G = Games played; AB = At bats; H = Hits; Avg. = Batting average; HR = Home runs; RBI = Runs batted in

Player	G	AB	H	Avg.	HR	RBI
Darryl Hamilton	122	405	126	.311	1	57
Dale Sveum	90	266	64	.241	4	43
Gary Sheffield	50	175	34	.194	2	22
Rick Dempsey	60	147	34	.231	4	21
Candy Maldonado	34	111	23	.207	5	20
Greg Brock	31	60	17	.283	1	6
George Canale	21	34	6	.176	3	10
Tim McIntosh	7	11	4	.364	1	1
Jim Olander	12	9	0	.000	0	0
Matías Carrillo	3	0	0	----	0	0

=== Pitching ===
==== Starting pitchers ====
Note: G = Games pitched; IP = Innings pitched; W = Wins; L = Losses; ERA = Earned run average; SO = Strikeouts

Player	G	IP	W	L	ERA	SO
Jaime Navarro	34	234.0	15	12	3.92	114
Chris Bosio	32	204.2	14	10	3.25	117
Bill Wegman	28	193.1	15	7	2.84	89
Don August	28	138.1	9	8	5.47	62
Teddy Higuera	7	36.1	3	2	4.46	33
Cal Eldred	3	16.0	2	0	4.50	10
Ron Robinson	1	4.1	0	1	6.23	0

==== Other pitchers ====
Note: G = Games pitched; IP = Innings pitched; W = Wins; L = Losses; ERA = Earned run average; SO = Strikeouts

Player	G	IP	W	L	ERA	SO
Dan Plesac	45	92.1	2	7	4.29	61
Kevin Brown	15	63.2	2	4	5.51	30
Mark Knudson	12	35.0	1	3	7.97	23
Jim Hunter	8	31.0	0	5	7.26	14
Mike Ignasiak	4	12.2	2	1	5.68	10
Chris George	2	6.0	0	0	3.00	2

==== Relief pitchers ====
Note: G = Games pitched; W = Wins; L = Losses; SV = Saves; ERA = Earned run average; SO = Strikeouts

Player	G	W	L	SV	ERA	SO
Doug Henry	32	2	1	15	1.00	28
Chuck Crim	66	8	5	3	4.63	39
Mark Lee	62	2	5	1	3.86	43
Julio Machado	54	3	3	3	3.45	98
Darren Holmes	40	1	4	3	4.72	59
Edwin Núñez	23	2	1	8	6.04	24
Jim Austin	5	0	0	0	8.31	3
Rick Dempsey	2	0	0	0	4.50	0

== Awards and honors ==
- Bill Wegman, Hutch Award

== Farm system ==
The Brewers' farm system consisted of seven minor league affiliates in 1991. The Denver Zephyrs won the American Association championship.

Level	Team	League	Manager
Triple-A	Denver Zephyrs	American Association	Tony Muser
Double-A	El Paso Diablos	Texas League	Dave Huppert
Class A-Advanced	Stockton Ports	California League	Chris Bando
Class A	Beloit Brewers	Midwest League	Rob Derksen
Rookie	Helena Brewers	Pioneer League	Harry Dunlop
Rookie	AZL Brewers	Arizona League	Wayne Krenchicki
Rookie	DSL Brewers	Dominican Summer League	—
