= Surhoff =

Surhoff is a surname. Notable people with the surname include:

- Austin Surhoff (born 1990), American swimmer
- B. J. Surhoff (born 1964), American baseball player
- Dick Surhoff (1929–1987), American basketballer
- Rich Surhoff (born 1962), American baseball player
