= 1986 College Baseball All-America Team =

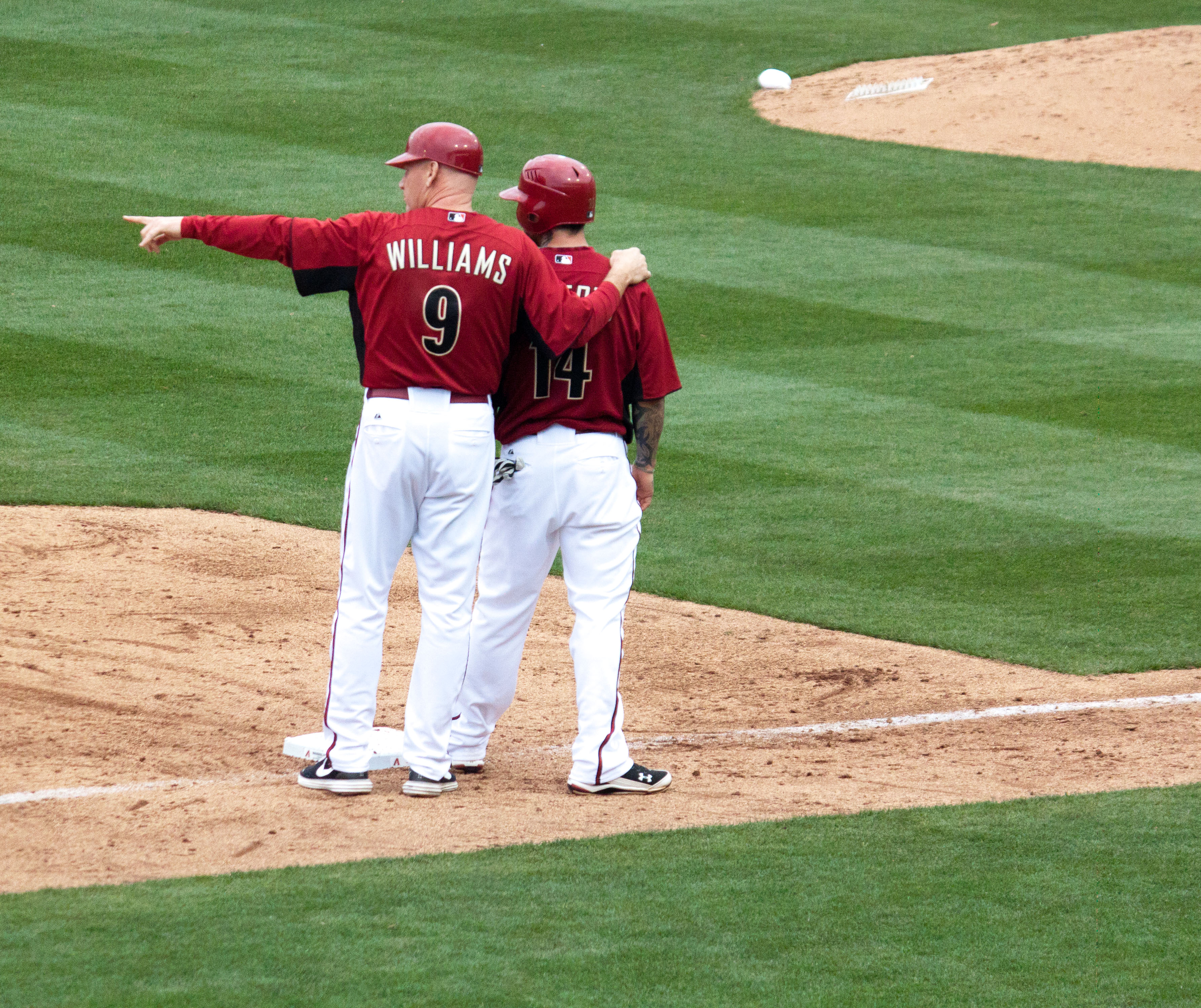
1986 All-Americans included five-time MLB All-Star Matt Williams.

This is a list of college baseball players named first team All-Americans for the 1986 NCAA Division I baseball season. From 1981 to 1990, there were three generally recognized All-America selectors for baseball: the American Baseball Coaches Association, Baseball America, and The Sporting News. In order to be considered a "consensus" All-American, a player must have been selected by at least two of these.

== Key ==
A	American Baseball Coaches Association
B	Baseball America
S	The Sporting News
	Member of the National College Baseball Hall of Fame
	Consensus All-American – selected by all three organizations
	Consensus All-American – selected by two organizations

== All-Americans ==
Position	Name	School	#	A	B	S	Other awards and honors
Pitcher	Kevin Brown	Georgia Tech	1	—	—	✓	
Pitcher	Richie Lewis	Florida State	1	—	✓	—	
Pitcher	Mike Loynd	Florida State	2	✓	✓	—	Golden Spikes Award Baseball America Pitcher of the Year
Pitcher	Rick Raether	Miami (FL)	2	✓	✓	—	
Pitcher	Alex Sanchez	UCLA	1	—	✓	—	
Pitcher	Greg Swindell	Texas	3	✓	✓	✓	Collegiate Baseball Player of the Year
Catcher	Doug Duke	Alabama	2	✓	✓	—	
Catcher	Scott Hemond	South Florida	1	—	—	✓	
First baseman	Rick Bernardo	Maine	1	✓	—	—	
First baseman	George Canale	Virginia Tech	2	—	✓	✓	
Second baseman	Scott Cerny	UC Santa Barbara	1	✓	—	—	
Second baseman	Luis Alicea	Florida State	2	—	✓	✓	
Shortstop	Matt Williams	UNLV	3	✓	✓	✓	
Third baseman	Jeff King	Arkansas	2	✓	—	✓	The Sporting News Player of the Year First overall pick in the 1986 MLB draft
Third baseman	Robin Ventura	Oklahoma State	1	—	✓	—	Baseball America Freshman of the Year
Outfielder	Todd Azar	Old Dominion	1	—	✓	—	
Outfielder	Casey Close	Michigan	2	✓	✓	—	Baseball America Player of the Year
Outfielder	Gary Cooper	BYU	1	✓	—	—	
Outfielder	Thomas Howard	Ball State	3	✓	✓	✓	
Outfielder	Paul Meyers	Nebraska	1	—	—	✓	
Outfielder	Rob Richie	Nevada	1	—	—	✓	
Designated hitter	Kevin Burdick	Oklahoma	1	✓	—	—	
Designated hitter	Craig Cooper	Georgia Southern	2	—	✓	✓	
Utility player	Winfred Johnson	East Carolina	1	✓	—	—	

== See also ==
- List of college baseball awards
