= Rick Peterson =

American baseball coach (born 1954)

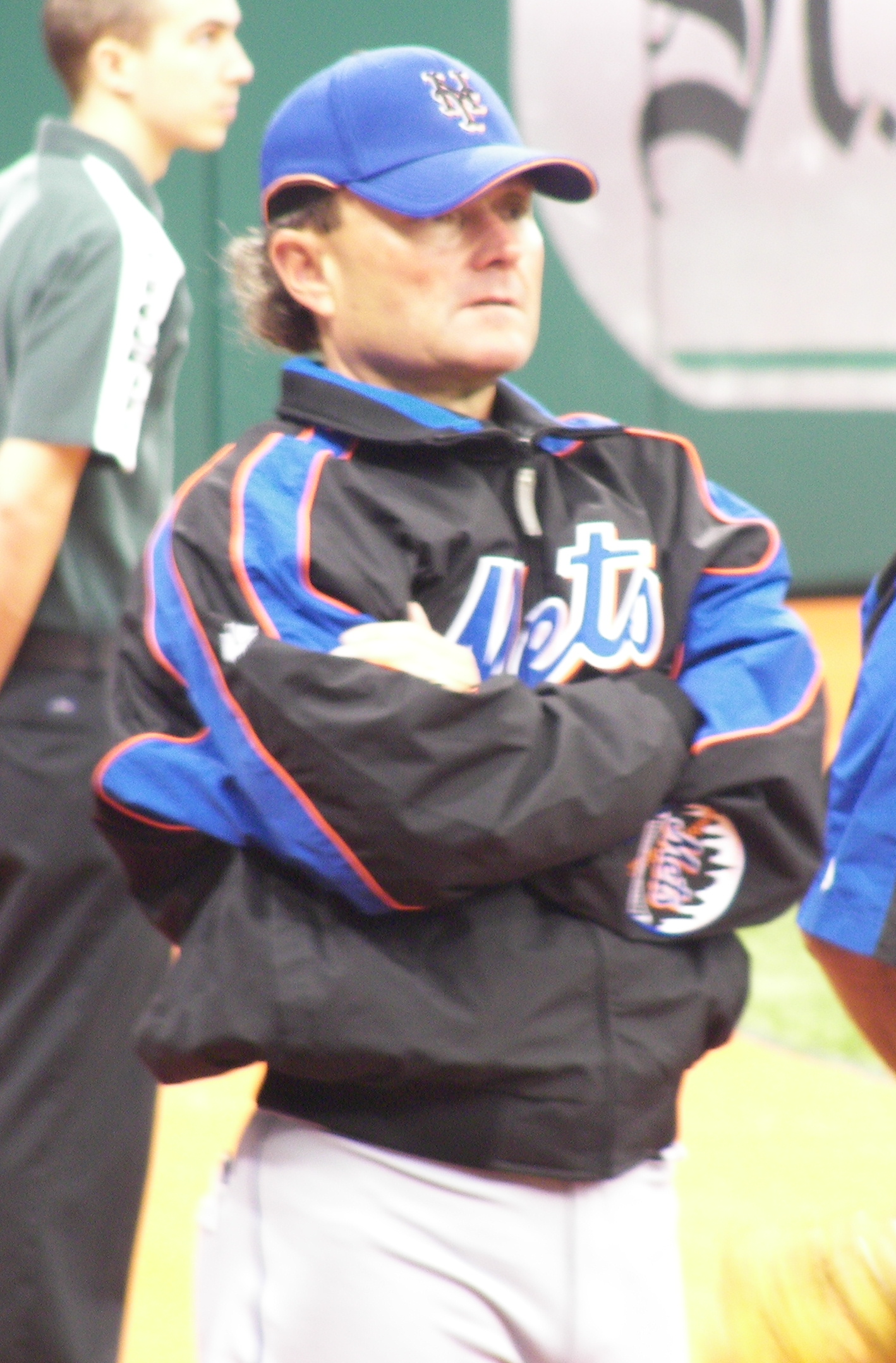
- Peterson with the New York Mets during spring training in 2007
- Pitcher / Pitching coach
- Born: October 30, 1954 (age 71); New Brunswick, New Jersey, U.S.
- Bats: Left Throws: Left
- Stats at Baseball Reference

Teams
- Pittsburgh Pirates (1984–1985); Chicago White Sox (1994); Oakland Athletics (1998–2003); New York Mets (2004–2008); Milwaukee Brewers (2010); Baltimore Orioles (2012–2016)

Erick Harding "Rick" Peterson (born October 30, 1954) is an American former pitcher and pitching coach in Major League Baseball. He was most recently the director of pitching development for the Baltimore Orioles. He was a pitcher in the Pittsburgh Pirates organization, but is most notable as the pitching coach for the Moneyball era Oakland Athletics, New York Mets, and the Milwaukee Brewers.

Peterson is known for his pioneering use of biomechanical analysis and research and mental game principles to help pitchers improve their pitching delivery and avoid injuries. His nicknames include "The Jacket" because he always wears a jacket during games, and "The Professor." He is also known for placing his hand on the shoulder of the pitchers to help them remain calm during mound visits.

== Early life and education ==
Peterson was born in New Brunswick, New Jersey. He graduated from Mt. Lebanon High School in the Pittsburgh suburb of Mt. Lebanon, Pennsylvania. The Baltimore Orioles drafted him out of high school, but instead of signing with the Orioles, he chose to be red shirted and went to Gulf Coast Junior College in Panama City, Florida. He then attended Jacksonville University and graduated with a combined degree in sports psychology and art.

== Playing career ==
Peterson was drafted for the second time in the 21st round of the June 1976 free agent draft by the Pittsburgh Pirates. At that time, his father, Pete Peterson, was Pittsburgh's farm system director and future general manager. and became the GM of the Pittsburgh Pirates 1979 World Series team. Rick Peterson played in class-A for the Pirates organization for four years, in 1976–79, and also made appearances at higher levels of the minors in 1982, 1983, and 1988.

== Coaching career ==
Peterson began his coaching career in Minor League Baseball when he coached with the single-A Salem Pirates (now Salem Avalanche) of the Carolina League from 1979 to 1980. In 1980, he was part of the coaching staff with the (R) Gulf Coast Pirates of the Gulf Coast League. From 1981 to 1982, Peterson was with the (AA) Buffalo Bisons of the Eastern League. After his stay in Buffalo, he got a coaching position with the (AA) Lynn Sailors of the Eastern League in 1983.

=== Pittsburgh Pirates ===
In 1984, Peterson became the bullpen coach of the Pittsburgh Pirates. Peterson held this coaching job with the Pirates from 1984 to 1985.

=== Cleveland Indians ===
His father was fired by the Pirates during the 1985 season, and Peterson left the Pittsburgh system after that season as well. He joined the Cleveland Indians organization in 1986 and was a part of the coaching staff of Waterbury (AA) of the Eastern League in 1986, Buffalo (AAA) of the American Association in 1987 and Colorado Springs Sky Sox (AAA) of the Pacific Coast League in 1988.

=== Chicago White Sox ===
After departing the Cleveland organization, Peterson joined the Chicago White Sox farm system and spent six seasons there as a pitching coach. Peterson was with Birmingham Barons (AA) of the Southern League in 1989–91, Vancouver (AAA) of the American Association in 1992, and Nashville (AAA) of the Pacific Coast League in 1993–94. After spending many years in the minor leagues, Peterson was promoted to the White Sox on June 21, 1994.

From 1990 to 1995, Peterson was Co-director of the sports psychology program at the Chicago White Sox.

=== Toronto Blue Jays ===
In 1996, Peterson became the Toronto Blue Jays minor league pitching coordinator. The following season, he was the pitching coach of the Trenton Thunder, then the AA affiliate of the Boston Red Sox.

=== Oakland Athletics ===
Peterson joined the Oakland Athletics organization as the pitching coordinator for the 1998 season. He was named the major league pitching coach for the A's on March 26, 1998. He is well known for helping the A's develop the ‘Big Three’ of Barry Zito, Mark Mulder, and Tim Hudson. All three pitchers became 20-game winners under Rick Peterson and Zito won the 2002 American League Cy Young Award. After he arrived in 1998, Peterson helped his pitching staff obtain an American League best ERA for two years, 3.58 in 2002 and 3.63 in 2003. Along with Billy Beane and Paul De Podesta, Peterson brought in the Moneyball era by developing the use of data analytics, predictive analysis and biomechanics for pitchers. The award winning book written by Michael Lewis and movie starring Brad Pitt told the story of how Moneyball Oakland A's revolutionize the game of baseball.

=== New York Mets ===
Peterson joined the New York Mets in November 2003 as their pitching coach, replacing Rick Waits. As the pitching coach he implemented the Moneyball strategies of biomechanics and data analytics to create winning strategies and enhance performance. He nurtured the talents of future Hall of Famers, Tom Glavine, Pedro Martinez, Billy Wagner and Mike Piazza. Tom Glavine said in his Hall of Fame speech that Rick Peterson gave him the confidence and ability to transform his game and achieve 300 wins to become a Hall of Famer. Billy Wagner who was inducted in 2025 said that Rick helped him to accomplish way beyond the results that he thought was possible.

On February 2, 2007, Peterson's contract with the Mets was extended through the 2009 season.

On June 17, 2008, Rick Peterson, along with Manager Willie Randolph and first base coach Tom Nieto, was fired from his position with the New York Mets.

=== Milwaukee Brewers ===
On October 19, 2009, Peterson agreed to become the Milwaukee Brewers new pitching coach. However, when new manager Ron Roenicke's 2011 staff was announced on November 15, 2010, it was revealed that Peterson had been replaced by Rick Kranitz with a year remaining on his contract.

=== Baltimore Orioles ===
In January 2012, Peterson was hired as the Director of Pitching Development for the Baltimore Orioles, a position he held through the 2016 season.

== Business ==
In 2014. Peterson wrote an award winning book Crunch Time, How to be Your Best When it Matters Most along with Judd Hoekstra. The book focuses on reframing pressure, performing your best and the mental game of champions and elite athletes. In 2016 he co-founded a consulting/coaching company where he does motivational speaking, elite business coaching and helps business leaders implement the attitudes and habits of champion athletes. Petersons program " The Mind of a Champion" has been a successful program implemented at many Fortune 500 companies and universities.

 Peterson is known for combining pitching drills and sports psychology with biomechanical analysis data using the work done by Dr. James Andrews’ American Sports Medicine Institute ASMI as the benchmark.

Sporting positions
Preceded by Bob Cluck	Oakland Athletics Pitching Coach; 1998–2003	Succeeded by Curt Young
Preceded by Vern Ruhle	New York Mets Pitching Coach; 2004–2008	Succeeded by Dan Warthen
Preceded by Chris Bosio	Milwaukee Brewers Pitching Coach; 2010	Succeeded by Rick Kranitz
