= Pikeville Cubs =

- 1982–1984; Pikeville, Kentucky

Minor league affiliations
- Class: Rookie (1982–1984)
- League: Appalachian League (1982–1984)

Major league affiliations
- Team: Milwaukee Brewers (1982); Chicago Cubs (1983–1984)

Minor league titles
- League titles (0): None
- Wild card berths (0): None

Team data
- Name: Pikeville Brewers (1982); Pikeville Cubs (1983–1984)
- Ballpark: Pikeville Athletic Field (1982–1984)

The Pikeville Cubs were a minor league baseball team based in Pikeville, Kentucky. From 1982 to 1984, Pikeville teams played as a member of the Rookie level Appalachian League, hosting home games at the Pikeville Athletic Field. The 1982 team played as the "Brewers." Pikeville was a minor league affiliate of the Milwaukee Brewers in 1982 and Chicago Cubs in 1983 and 1984.

Baseball Hall of Fame member Greg Maddux played for the 1984 Pikeville Cubs in his first professional season.

== History ==
Minor league baseball began in Pikeville, Kentucky in 1982. The Pikeville Brewers joined the eight–team Rookie level Appalachian League in 1982. In their first season of play, Pikeville finished with a 25–42 record in the 1982 Appalachian League, playing along with league members Bluefield Orioles (47–22), Bristol Tigers (28–36), Elizabethton Twins (32–36), Johnson City Cardinals (32–35), Kingsport Mets (28–40), Paintsville Yankees (43–27) and Pulaski Braves (36–33).

The 1982 Pikeville Brewers were an affiliate of the Milwaukee Brewers, finishing in fourth place (last) in the North Division of the Appalachian League. Playing under manager Tim Nordbrook, Pikeville drew 13,441 fans for the 1982 season, an average of 401 per home contest. The Pikeville Brewers finished 21.0 games behind the first place Bluefield Orioles in the North Division final standings.

Remaining in the Appalachian League in 1983, Pikeville became an affiliate of the Chicago Cubs and adopted the Pikeville "Cubs" moniker. The 1983 Pikeville Cubs finished with a 33–37 record, placing fourth in the North Division, playing the season under manager Jim Fairey. The season attendance was 4,998 an average of 143, lowest in the league. The Cubs finished 13.0 games behind the first place Paintsville Brewers in the overall league standings.

The 1984 season was Pikeville's final season in the Appalachian League. The 1984 Pikeville Cubs finished with a 34–34 record, placing third in the North Division and fifth overall, playing under returning manager Jim Fairey. The Pikeville Cubs ended the season 2.5 games behind the first place Pulaski Braves in the final North Division standings. Pikeville was again last in the league in home attendance, drawing 5,511 total fans for the season.

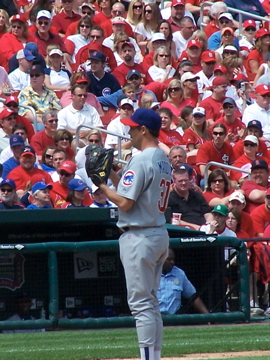
(2006) Greg Maddux, Chicago Cubs

At age 18, Baseball Hall of Fame inductee Greg Maddux pitched for the Pikeville Cubs in 1984, compiling a 6–2 record and a 2.63 ERA in his first professional season. During an early season pitching staff meeting with player/pitching coach Rick Kranitz, Maddux reportedly asked "What's the sign for a brushback pitch?" Maddux later approached Kranitz and said, "You need to teach me something." This led to Maddux being shown different grips to throw a change up, which he threw for the remainder of his career. Greg Maddux was inducted into the Appalachian League Hall of Fame in 2019, as part of the inaugural class of the league's hall of fame.

The Pikeville franchise folded after the 1984 season, with the Cubs Rookie level franchise moving to Wytheville, Virginia, to become the 1985 Wytheville Cubs.

Pikeville was without a minor league team until the 1993 Kentucky Rifles began play as members of the Frontier League.

== The ballpark ==
Pikeville minor league teams hosted home minor league games at the Pikeville Athletic Field. The ballpark was also known as "W. C. Hambley Field." Located at Hambley Boulevard (US 460 & US 23), in Pikeville, Kentucky, the site is still in use today. Today, the Pikeville High School and University of Pikeville athletic teams play at the site.

== Timeline ==
Year(s)	# Yrs.	Team	Level	League	Affiliate	Ballpark
1982	1	Pikeville Brewers	Rookie	Appalachian League	Milwaukee Brewers	Pikeville Athletic Field
1983–1984	2	Pikeville Cubs	Rookie	Appalachian League	Chicago Cubs	Pikeville Athletic Field

== Year–by–year records ==
Year	Record	Finish	Manager	Attendance	Playoffs/Notes
1982	25–42	4th	Tim Nordbrook	13,441	Did not qualify
1983	33–37	4th	Jim Fairey	4,998	Did not qualify
1984	34–34	5th	Jim Fairey	5,511	Did not qualify

== Notable alumni ==
- Greg Maddux (1984) Inducted Baseball Hall of Fame, 2014
- Jay Aldrich (1982)
- Stan Boroski (1982)
- Jacob Brumfield (1983)
- Chris Bosio (1982)
- Chuck Crim (1982)
- Edgar Diaz (1982)
- Rick Kranitz (1984)
- Dave Liddell (1984)
- Tim Nordbrook (1982, MGR)
- Hipólito Peña (1982)
- Jeff Pico (1984)
- Billy Jo Robidoux (1982)
- Jeff Schwarz (1983)
- Dwight Smith (1984)
- Dale Sveum (1982)

== See also ==
- Pikeville Cubs players
- Pikeville Brewers players
