= Rey Palacios =

American baseball player (born 1962)

- Catcher
- Born: November 8, 1962 (age 63); Brooklyn, New York, U.S.
- Batted: Right Threw: Right

MLB debut
- September 8, 1988, for the Kansas City Royals

Last MLB appearance
- September 14, 1990, for the Kansas City Royals

MLB statistics
- Batting average: .193
- Home runs: 3
- Runs batted in: 19
- Stats at Baseball Reference

Teams
- Kansas City Royals (1988–1990)

Robert Rey Palacios (born November 8, 1962) is an American former professional baseball catcher who played for the Kansas City Royals of Major League Baseball (MLB).

== Career ==
=== Professional baseball ===
Palacios attended Kingsborough Community College in his hometown of Brooklyn, New York. In 1982, he signed with the Detroit Tigers as an undrafted free agent and was assigned to the Rookie-level Bristol Tigers for the 1983 minor league season. Palacios worked his way through the Tigers minor league organization, eventually reaching the Triple-A Toledo Mud Hens in 1987. In 1988, Palacios was traded to the Kansas City Royals, along with Mark Lee, in exchange for Ted Power. He would play in five games for the Royals that year, hitting .091. Palacios split time in 1989 and 1990 with the Royals and the Triple-A Omaha Royals, appearing in 96 MLB games and 38 Minor League games. He did not play at any level in 1991, and in 1992 played 29 games with the Double-A Midland Angels of the California Angels minor league organization. In 1993, Palacios played one game with the Baltimore Orioles Triple-A affiliate, the Rochester Red Wings, before retiring.

=== After baseball ===
After Palacios retired, he worked as a firefighter for the Rochester, New York Fire Department for 25 years. Palacios assisted in the search and rescue efforts when the September 11 attacks happened. Palacios responded with Ladder Company 101, Engine 202, Battalion 32 out of Red Hook, Brooklyn, which was the ladder company he worked with. Battalion 32 had the most firefighter fatalities out of any battalion that day, with 19.

== Personal life ==
His nephew, Josh, was drafted in the fourth round of the 2016 Major League Baseball draft by the Toronto Blue Jays, and made his MLB debut for Toronto in 2021. Another nephew, Richie, was selected in the 2018 Major League Baseball draft.
