= Colin Moran =

American baseball player (born 1992)

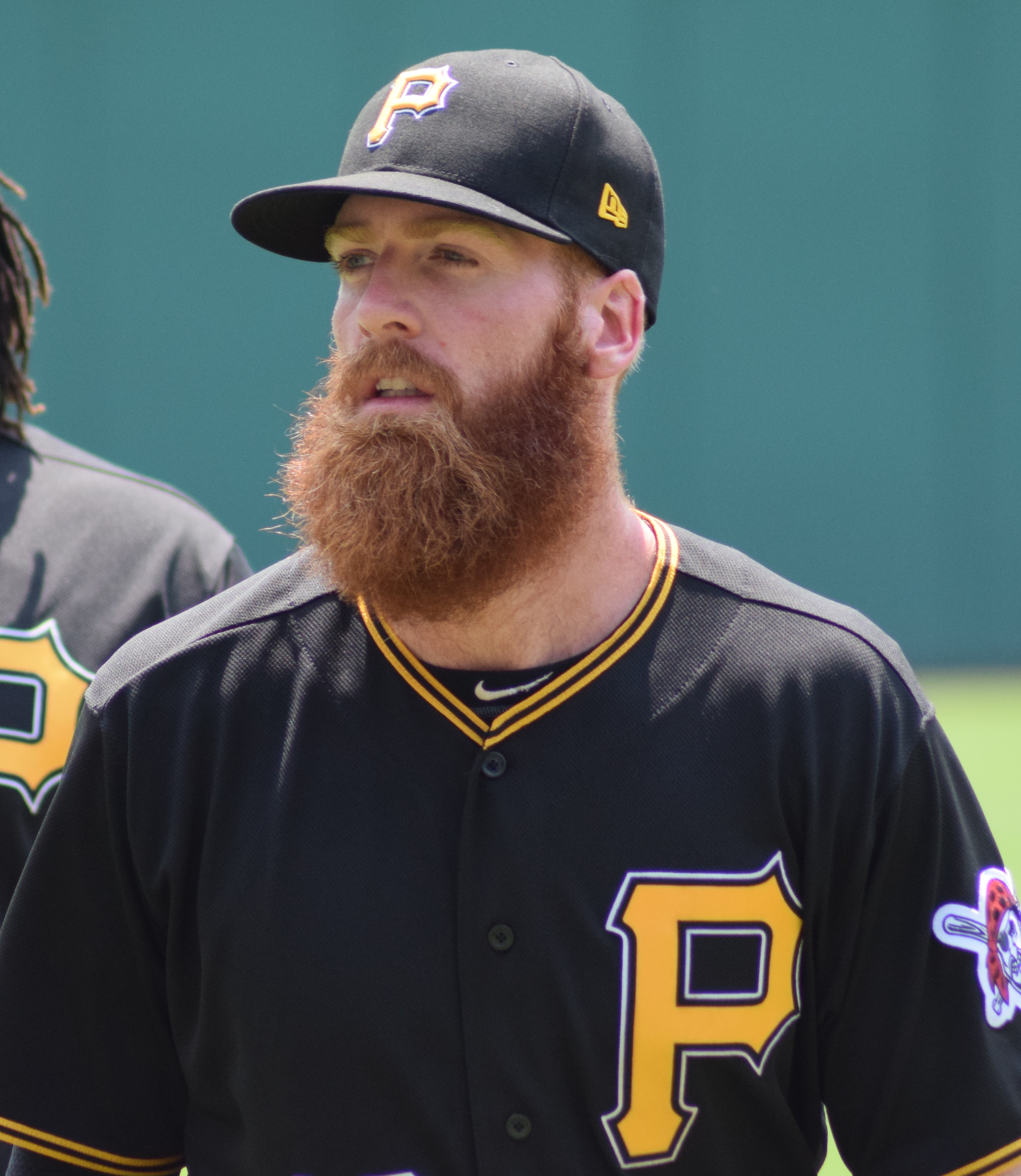
- Moran with the Pirates in 2018

Free agent
- Third baseman / First baseman
- Born: October 1, 1992 (age 34); Port Chester, New York, U.S.
- Bats: Left Throws: Right

MLB debut
- May 18, 2016, for the Houston Astros

MLB statistics (through 2022 season)
- Batting average: .263
- Home runs: 50
- Runs batted in: 239
- Stats at Baseball Reference

Teams
- Houston Astros (2016–2017); Pittsburgh Pirates (2018–2021); Cincinnati Reds (2022)

Colin Richard Moran (born October 1, 1992) is an American professional baseball third baseman who is a free agent. He has previously played in Major League Baseball (MLB) for the Houston Astros, Pittsburgh Pirates and Cincinnati Reds.

Moran attended the University of North Carolina at Chapel Hill, where he played college baseball for the North Carolina Tar Heels baseball team. In his freshman season, he was named Freshman of the Year and was the only freshman named to the All-America team. After his junior year, the Miami Marlins selected Moran with the sixth overall selection of the 2013 Major League Baseball draft. They traded him to the Astros the next season. The Astros promoted Moran to the major leagues in 2016. The Astros traded him to the Pirates in a package for Gerrit Cole on January 13, 2018.

== Amateur career ==
Moran attended Iona Preparatory School in New Rochelle, New York. Undrafted out of high school, he chose to attend the University of North Carolina at Chapel Hill (UNC) to play college baseball for the North Carolina Tar Heels baseball team in the Atlantic Coast Conference (ACC). In his freshman year, he led the Tar Heels with a .335 batting average, .442 on-base percentage, .540 slugging percentage, nine home runs, 71 runs batted in and 20 doubles.

Moran was named to the National Collegiate Baseball Writers Association Freshman All-America team, ACC Freshman of the Year, and Baseball America Freshman of the Year. Moran was named a Baseball America All-American, the only freshman to earn the honor.

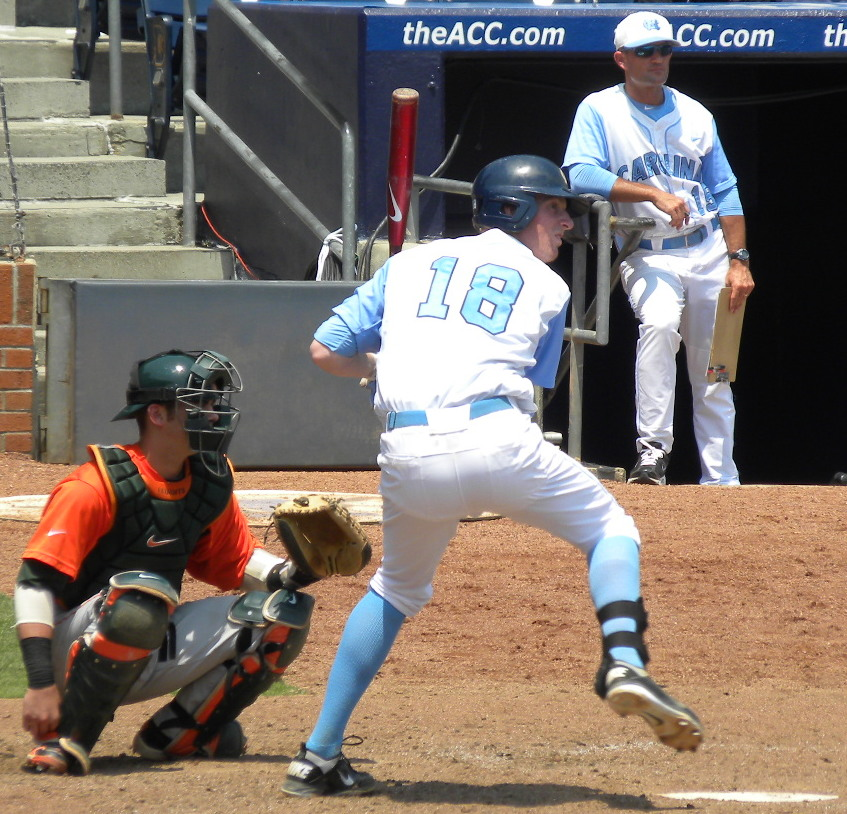
Moran with North Carolina in 2011

Despite an injury shortened sophomore season, Moran again led the Tar Heels with a .365 average and 35 RBIs. Moran followed the injury-plagued season by being selected as a second team All America by Louisville Slugger, ACC player of the year, and a finalist for the Golden Spikes Award while setting a single season RBI record for UNC, with 86 runs batted in. In 2011 and 2012, he played collegiate summer baseball with the Bourne Braves of the Cape Cod Baseball League, and was named a league all-star in both seasons. Moran led the Tar Heels in 2013 with 13 home runs, along with a .544 slugging percentage, and a .470 on-base percentage.

== Professional career ==
=== Miami Marlins ===
The Miami Marlins selected Moran in the first round, with the sixth overall selection, of the 2013 MLB draft. Moran signed with the Marlins, receiving a $3.5 million signing bonus. He hit a home run in his first professional at-bat, as a member of the Greensboro Grasshoppers of the Single–A South Atlantic League. He spent all of his first professional season with Greensboro, batting .299 with four home runs and 23 RBI in 42 games.

Attending spring training in 2014, Moran sprained the medial collateral ligament in his left knee. He began the 2014 season on the disabled list before being assigned to the Marlins' High–A affiliate, the Jupiter Hammerheads of the Florida State League.

=== Houston Astros ===
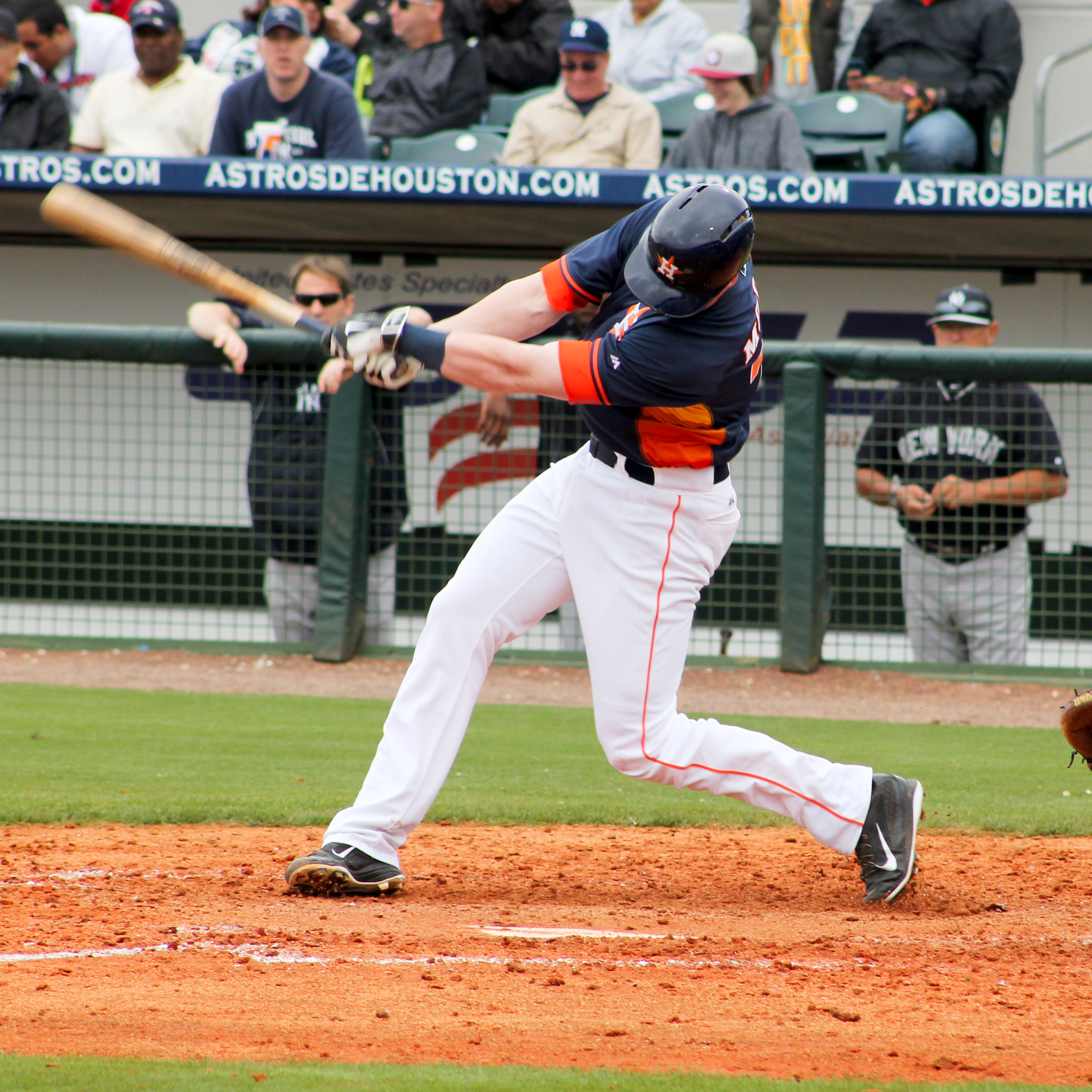
Moran during spring training in 2015

On July 31, 2014, the Marlins traded Moran, Jake Marisnick, Francis Martes, and a compensatory draft pick to the Houston Astros in exchange for Jarred Cosart, Enrique Hernández, and Austin Wates. The Astros assigned Moran to the Corpus Christi Hooks of the Double–A Texas League. In 117 games between Jupiter and Corpus Christi, he batted .296/.344/.397 with seven home runs and 55 RBI.

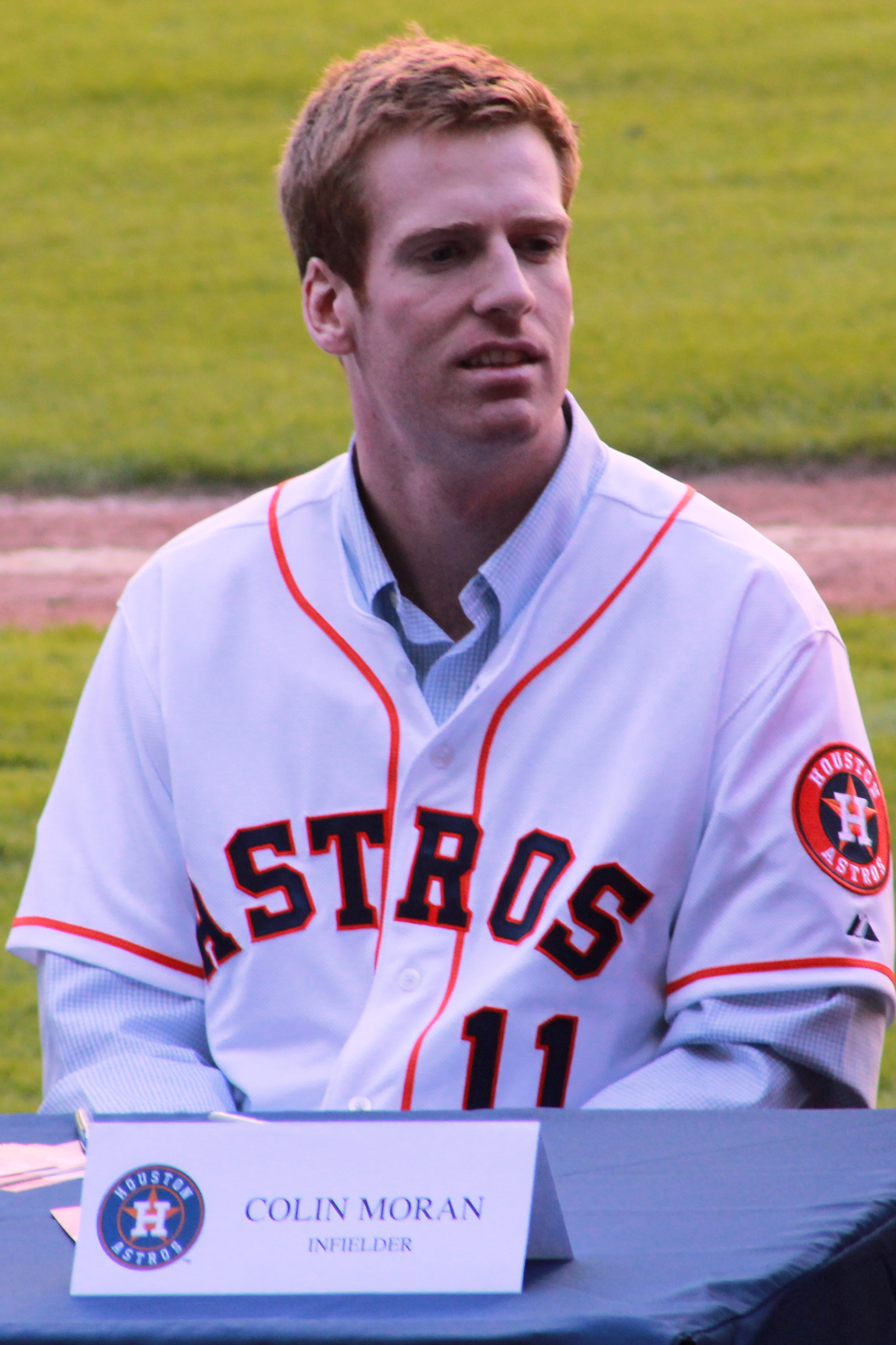
Moran with the Astros in 2015

The Astros invited Moran to spring training in 2015. He began the season back with Corpus Christi. In May 2015, a throw hit Moran in the face that fractured his jaw, requiring surgery. He was activated later in the month, but was placed back on the disabled list on June 12. He was activated June 21. In 96 games for the Hooks, he slashed .306/.381/.459 with nine home runs and 67 RBI.

Moran opened the 2016 season with the Fresno Grizzlies of the Triple–A Pacific Coast League. The Astros promoted him to the major leagues on May 17. Moran batted 2-for-19 (.105) before he was optioned back to Fresno. He began the 2017 season with Fresno and was promoted to the major leagues on July 18. Moran would play nine games with the Astros in 2016, compiling a .130 average and two RBI. In 117 games for Fresno, he batted .259 with ten home runs and 69 RBI.

Moran began 2017 with Fresno. He was recalled by the Astros on July 18. On July 22, Moran was injured in the sixth inning when he fouled an inside pitch from Baltimore Orioles reliever Darren O'Day straight up and into the left area of his eye. Moran went down to the ground and grabbed his face, which had started to bleed. After a lengthy time down on the field with athletic trainers—including a brief moment where he attempted to stand up but couldn't – he was carted off the field. Moran suffered a facial fracture from the foul ball, and was placed on the 10-day disabled list.

The Astros finished the 2017 season with a 101–61 record and won the 2017 World Series. Moran did not play in the playoffs, but won his first championship as he was still on the team's 40-man roster at the time. In nine games for Houston, he batted .364 with one home run and three RBI, and in 79 games for Fresno, he posted a .308 batting average with 18 home runs and 63 RBI.

=== Pittsburgh Pirates ===
On January 13, 2018, the Astros traded Moran, Joe Musgrove, Michael Feliz, and Jason Martin to the Pittsburgh Pirates in exchange for Gerrit Cole. MLB.com ranked Moran as Pittsburgh's eighth best prospect going into the 2018 season. After the trade, Moran was named Pittsburgh's starting third baseman.

During the Pirates home opener on April 2, 2018, in his first at-bat for the Pirates at PNC Park, Moran hit his first career grand slam off of Lance Lynn. Moran finished his 2018 campaign slashing .277/.340/.407 with 11 home runs and 58 RBI in 144 games.

In a game against the Miami Marlins on September 5, 2019, Moran faced his older brother Brian Moran in Brian's major league debut. He ended up striking out on a full-count slider against Brian. In the pandemic shortened 2020 season, Moran led the Pirates in total bases (84), home runs (10), and tied for first in RBI (23), slashing .247/.325/.472.

On November 29, 2021, Moran was designated for assignment by the Pirates following the signing of Yoshitomo Tsutsugo. The next day, Moran was non-tendered by the Pirates, making him a free agent.

=== Cincinnati Reds ===
On March 17, 2022, Moran officially signed a one-year contract with the Cincinnati Reds. He was removed from the 40-man roster and sent outright to the Triple-A Louisville Bats on June 29.

Moran had his contract selected back to the major league roster on August 27. On September 6, Moran was designated for assignment and was released on September 8.

=== Seattle Mariners ===
On January 10, 2023, Moran signed a minor league contract with the Seattle Mariners organization. In 40 games for the Triple–A Tacoma Rainiers, he batted .257/.361/.397 with 5 home runs and 28 RBI. Moran opted out of his minor league contract and became a free agent on July 10.

=== High Point Rockers ===
On April 30, 2024, Moran signed with the High Point Rockers of the Atlantic League of Professional Baseball. In 51 games for the Rockers, he slashed .290/.355/.495 with eight home runs and 24 RBI. Moran was released by High Point on August 12.

On May 9, 2025, Moran signed with the Leones de Yucatán of the Mexican League. However, on May 12, it was announced he would not report due to personal reasons.

== Personal life ==
Moran's brother, Brian Moran, is a professional baseball pitcher. His uncles, Rich and B. J. Surhoff, played in Major League Baseball. His grandfather, Dick Surhoff, played in the NBA with the New York Knicks.

Moran and his wife, Kelsey, married in 2017 and had their first child, a daughter in 2020.

Moran grew up a fan of the Baltimore Orioles.
