= Ted Power =

American baseball player and coach (born 1955)

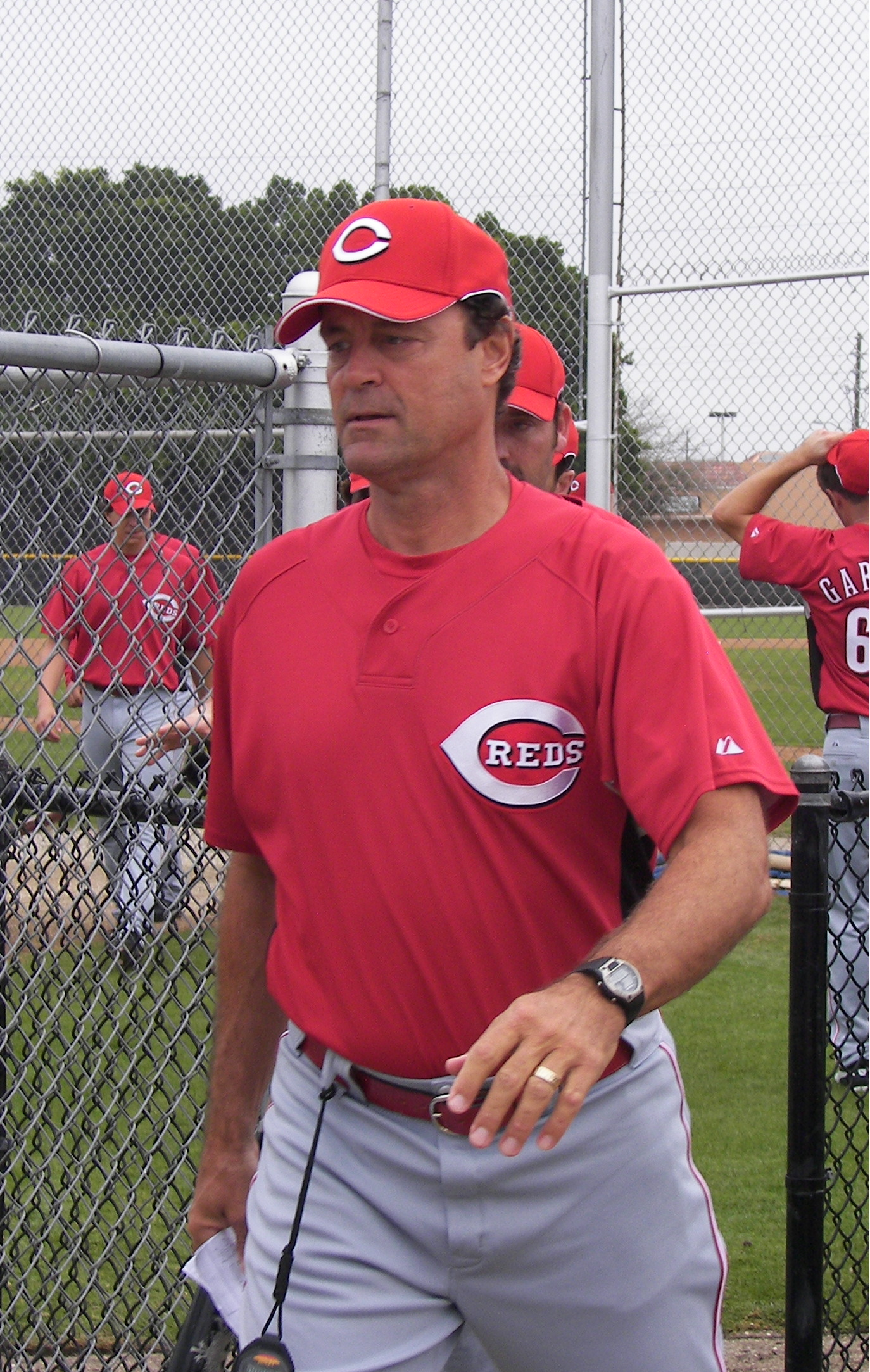
- Power with the Cincinnati Reds
- Pitcher
- Born: January 31, 1955 (age 71); Guthrie, Oklahoma, U.S.
- Batted: Right Threw: Right

MLB debut
- September 9, 1981, for the Los Angeles Dodgers

Last MLB appearance
- September 30, 1993, for the Seattle Mariners

MLB statistics
- Win–loss record: 68–69
- Earned run average: 4.00
- Strikeouts: 701
- Saves: 70
- Stats at Baseball Reference

Teams
- Los Angeles Dodgers (1981–1982); Cincinnati Reds (1983–1987); Kansas City Royals (1988); Detroit Tigers (1988); St. Louis Cardinals (1989); Pittsburgh Pirates (1990); Cincinnati Reds (1991); Cleveland Indians (1992–1993); Seattle Mariners (1993)

Ted Henry Power (born January 31, 1955) is an American former Major League Baseball (MLB) pitcher and a minor league baseball coach. During a 13-year career in the major leagues, he pitched for the Los Angeles Dodgers (1981–1982), Cincinnati Reds (1983–1987, 1991), Kansas City Royals (1988), Detroit Tigers (1988), St. Louis Cardinals (1989), Pittsburgh Pirates (1990), Cleveland Indians (1992–93), and the Seattle Mariners (1993).

Power spent most of his career as a relief pitcher, and he held the closer role for the Reds for a couple of seasons in the mid-1980s. From 1986 to 1989, he spent significant time in his teams' starting rotations before moving back to the bullpen for the last few years of his career. He earned 70 career saves. He suffered a career-ending shoulder injury before the 1994 season and later entered coaching. He was the pitching coach for the Louisville Bats from 2006 to 2016.

== Early life ==
Power was born on January 31, 1955, in Guthrie, Oklahoma, and played five sports at Abilene High School in Abilene, Kansas. He played college baseball at Kansas State University. Power was a fifth-round selection by the Los Angeles Dodgers in the June 1976 free agent draft. His best minor league season came in 1981 with the Class AAA Albuquerque Dukes, for whom he won 18 games. He was a Pacific Coast League All-Star that year.

== Early MLB career ==
After a call-up to the Dodgers toward the end of the 1981 season, he became the only pitcher to win 20 professional games that year.

In 1982, Power appeared in eight games for the Dodgers, earning an ERA over 6.00 before he was sent back down to the Albuquerque Dukes. He was traded to the Cincinnati Reds that year in exchange for an unknown amount of money. He finished the season with a total of 12 major league games pitched and a 1–1 win–loss record, having given up 38 hits and 27 runs in 33.2 innings. Returning to the Reds in 1983, he played in 49 games and went 5–6. He pitched in 111 innings and allowed 62 runs on 120 hits.

In 1984, Power pitched in a league-high 78 games. He went 9–7 and earned a career-high 11 saves, allowing 37 runs on 93 hits in 108 2/3 innings. In 1985, Power was the Reds' primary closing pitcher. He finished 50 games; only one NL pitcher finished more. He ended the season with 27 saves, which was the third-highest total in the league.

== Move to the starting rotation ==
After his success in 1985, it looked like Power and the Reds would enter into salary arbitration before the 1986 season, as the parties were failing to successfully negotiate a raise from Power's $255,000 salary from the year before. In mid-February, Power and the Reds avoided arbitration, agreeing to a $500,000 contract for the coming season. Power and the left-handed Franco were predicted to share the closer role for the Reds. Franco pitched well, but Power struggled. Power's slider, which was a key part of his 1985 success, was ineffective. He lost his role as the team's right-handed closer that year due to middle reliever Ron Robinson; 46 appearances into the season, he had only earned one save.

On August 22, Power moved from a relief pitching role into the starting rotation because of injuries sustained by pitchers Mario Soto and John Denny. In his third start on September 1, Power earned his first win as a part of the 1986 rotation, holding the Pittsburgh Pirates hitless until the sixth inning. Power said that the starting role was fun but he viewed himself as a fill-in in the rotation.

In 1987, the Reds passed on extending Denny's contract, which left a continued hole in the starting rotation for Power to fill. Power pitched for the Reds in 34 games and went 10–13. He pitched in 204.0 innings and allowed 115 runs on 215 hits.

Before the 1988 season, Power and Kurt Stillwell were traded to the Kansas City Royals in exchange for Danny Jackson and Ángel Salazar. Power, who was happy to be closer to his hometown and family, said that he would accept a bullpen role with the team but hoped to earn a place on the team's starting rotation. He started the season in the bullpen, but the team promoted him to the starting rotation in early May when they expanded the rotation from four men to five men. He pitched in 22 games and went 5–6. He allowed 54 runs on 98 hits in 80.1 innings.

Late in the season he was traded to the Detroit Tigers for minor leaguers Rey Palacios and Mark Lee. Power was assigned to the Tigers' bullpen, but he ended up pitching seven innings in his Detroit debut when the team's rookie starter was pulled very early in the game. He appeared in four games for Detroit, going 1–1 allowing 13 runs on 23 hits over 18.2 innings.

== Later career ==
In 1989, the St. Louis Cardinals signed Power to a minor league contract. He was called up from the minor leagues in May. In August, Power took a bid for a no-hitter into the eighth inning. He was 7–7 in 97 innings at the major league level. He allowed 47 runs and 96 hits.

In 1990, Power played for the Pittsburgh Pirates and pitched 51 2/3 innings in 40 games and went 1–3. In the 1990 National League Championship Series, Power made the only postseason appearances of his career. He appeared as a reliever in two games and he started the sixth game as part of an attempt to defeat the Reds' platoon system. When the Pirates announced that Power would start the game, the Reds started their left-handed-hitting platoon. After the right-handed Power pitched three innings, Pittsburgh manager Jim Leyland brought in left-handed starter Zane Smith to have more favorable matchups against the left-handed Reds lineup. Power and Smith each gave up only one run, but the team lost the game 2–1.

Power became a free agent after the 1990 season; he was disappointed with salary negotiations with the Pirates, which he said would have only given him a raise on his 1990 salary ($500,000) if he met all of the incentives specified in the Pittsburgh offer. He was signed by the Reds in December. In 1991, he played in 68 games and pitched 87.0 innings, allowing 37 runs and 87 hits. The Reds did not offer him salary arbitration after the 1991 season, and Power became a free agent. In 1992, Power played for the Cleveland Indians and played in 64 games and went 3–3. He played in 99.1 innings and allowed 88 hits and 33 runs.

In 1993, he made 20 relief appearances for the Indians and went 0–2, allowing 30 hits and 17 runs in 20 innings. He was on the disabled list twice that season, and by July the team had decided to demote him to the minor leagues. Power refused the demotion and the team placed him on waivers. He signed with Seattle and played in 25 games and had a record of 2–2. He pitched in 25.1 innings and allowed 11 runs on 27 hits.

Power suffered a shoulder injury during spring training drills before the 1994 season. He was diagnosed with a torn labrum and he indicated that he would seek multiple medical opinions to find out whether he was a candidate for arthroscopic surgery. While an arthroscopic procedure would require several months of recovery, an open shoulder surgery was thought to be career-ending for Power. Orthopedic surgeon James Andrews agreed to perform the surgery arthroscopically if he found limited damage inside Power's shoulder.

On March 11, Power had arthroscopic surgery. He missed the entire 1994 season. In October of that year, Power refused a minor league assignment with the team and he was made a free agent.

== Coaching career ==
He was the pitching coach for the San Diego Padres affiliate in the Arizona Rookie League in 1996. The club won the league championship that year. In 2000 and 2001, Power was the pitching coach for the Reds' Pioneer League team, the Billings Mustangs. In 2001, the team won the championship. In 2002, Power was the pitching coach for the Dayton Dragons. In 2016, he began his eleventh season as the pitching coach for the Louisville Bats, the Triple-A affiliate of the Cincinnati Reds. On July 4, Power was promoted to bullpen coach for the Reds after former pitching coach Mark Riggins was fired.
