= Rich Surhoff =

American baseball player (born 1962)

- Pitcher
- Born: October 3, 1962 (age 63); Bronx, New York, U.S.
- Batted: Right Threw: Right

MLB debut
- September 8, 1985, for the Philadelphia Phillies

Last MLB appearance
- October 6, 1985, for the Texas Rangers

MLB statistics
- Win–loss record: 1–1
- Earned run average: 6.75
- Strikeouts: 9
- Stats at Baseball Reference

Teams
- Philadelphia Phillies (1985); Texas Rangers (1985)

Richard Clifford Surhoff III (born October 3, 1962) is an American former Major League Baseball (MLB) player. A pitcher, Surhoff played for the Texas Rangers and Philadelphia Phillies in 1985. He last played professional baseball in 1989.

== Personal ==
Surhoff is the older brother of former MLB player B. J. Surhoff, the son of former National Basketball Association (NBA) player Dick Surhoff, and uncle of Austin Surhoff, Brian and Colin Moran.
