= Rick Kranitz =

American baseball pitching coach for the Atlanta Braves (born 1958)

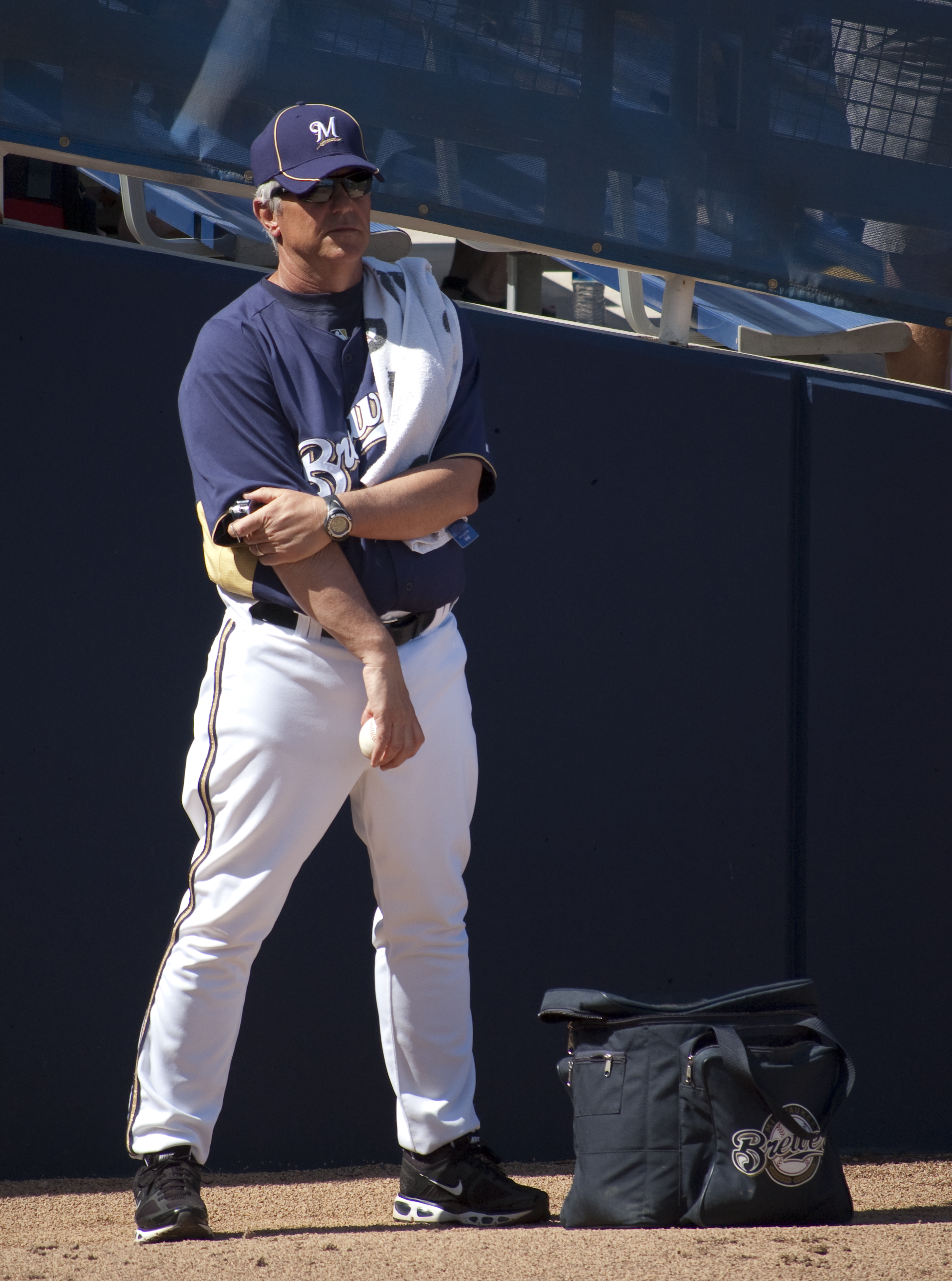
- Kranitz as pitching coach for the Milwaukee Brewers in 2011
- Pitching coach
- Born: September 15, 1958 (age 68); San Rafael, California, U.S.
- Stats at Baseball Reference

Teams
- As coach: Chicago Cubs (2002); Florida Marlins (2006–2007); Baltimore Orioles (2008–2010); Milwaukee Brewers (2011–2015); Philadelphia Phillies (2016–2018); Atlanta Braves (2019–2025)

Career highlights and awards
- World Series champion (2021)

Richard Alan Kranitz (born September 15, 1958) is an American professional baseball coach. Previously, he served as the pitching coach for the Baltimore Orioles, Milwaukee Brewers, Florida Marlins, Philadelphia Phillies, and Atlanta Braves.

== Playing career ==
Kranitz attended Apollo High School in Glendale, Arizona. He went to Yavapai College and Oklahoma State University.

Kranitz was drafted by the Milwaukee Brewers in the fourth round (101st overall) of the 1979 Major League Baseball draft. He pitched in the minor leagues from 1979 through 1985 without making the majors.

== Coaching career ==
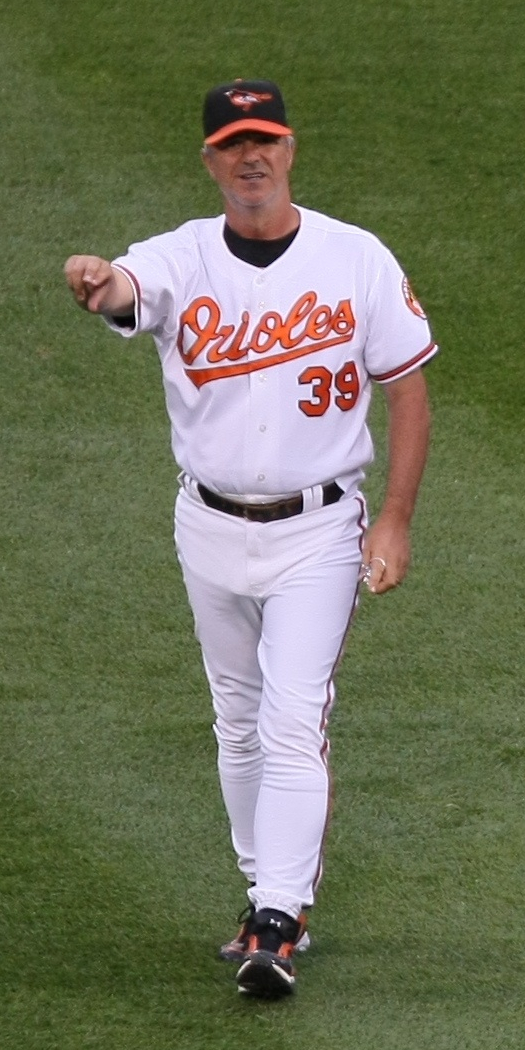
Kranitz as pitching coach for the Baltimore Orioles in 2009

Kranitz served as a player-coach with the Pikeville Cubs in 1984 and the Winston-Salem Spirits in 1985, though he pitched a total of three innings in those seasons. He served as a minor league pitching coach, Minor League Pitching Coordinator and an assistant coach for the Cubs organization through 2001, when he was named the bullpen coach for the 2002 season. Kranitz managed the Daytona Cubs in 2003 and served as the pitching coach for the Iowa Cubs in 2004 and 2005.

Kranitz was named the pitching coach for the Florida Marlins in 2006. He was named Baseball America's 2006 Major League Coach of the Year in his first year as pitching coach for the Marlins. Kranitz remained with the Marlins in 2007, but resigned shortly before the end of the season.

In 2008, Kranitz became the pitching coach for the Baltimore Orioles. There, he struggled to find the same success as in Florida; in 2008 and 2009 the Orioles' pitching staff posted team ERAs of 5.13 and 5.15, respectively. In 2010, although the end-of-year numbers were much more respectable, the team was doomed by a historically futile start that saw them win only 34 of their first 105 games.

On November 1, 2010, Kranitz accepted an offer from the Houston Astros to become their minor league pitching coordinator.

On November 15, 2010, it was announced that Kranitz would be replacing Rick Peterson as pitching coach for the Milwaukee Brewers. He was dismissed after the 2015 season.

Kranitz became the bullpen coach for the Philadelphia Phillies in the 2016 season, and was promoted to pitching coach for the 2018 season. Kranitz was fired by the Phillies shortly after the 2018 season.

The Atlanta Braves announced on December 6, 2018, that Kranitz had joined manager Brian Snitker's staff.

Kranitz won the World Series with the Atlanta Braves on November 2, 2021. On November 5, 2025, the Braves hired Jeremy Hefner as the team's pitching coach, replacing Kranitz.

Sporting positions
Preceded by Dave Trembley	Daytona Cubs manager 2003	Succeeded by Steve McFarland
Preceded by Mark Wiley	Florida Marlins pitching coach 2006–2007	Succeeded by Mark Wiley
Preceded by Leo Mazzone	Baltimore Orioles pitching coach 2008–2010	Succeeded by Mark Connor
Preceded by Rick Peterson	Milwaukee Brewers pitching coach 2011–2015	Succeeded by Derek Johnson
Preceded by Rod Nichols	Philadelphia Phillies bullpen coach 2016	Succeeded by John McLaren
Preceded by Position established	Philadelphia Phillies assistant pitching coach 2017	Succeeded by Chris Young
Preceded by Bob McClure	Philadelphia Phillies pitching coach 2018	Succeeded by Chris Young
Preceded by Chuck Hernandez	Atlanta Braves pitching coach 2019–	Succeeded by Incumbent
