= Edgar Díaz (baseball) =

Puerto Rican baseball player (born 1964)

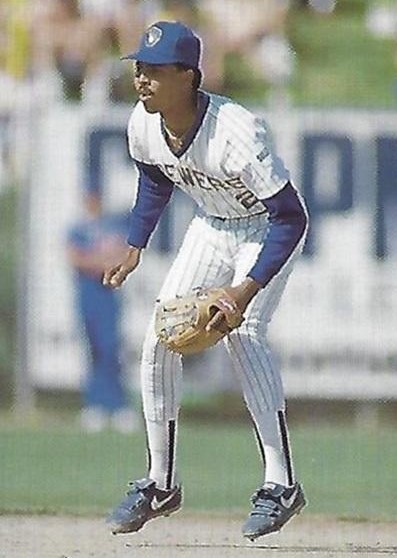
- Shortstop
- Born: February 8, 1964 (age 62); Santurce, Puerto Rico
- Batted: Right Threw: Right

MLB debut
- September 16, 1986, for the Milwaukee Brewers

Last MLB appearance
- September 28, 1990, for the Milwaukee Brewers

MLB statistics
- Batting average: .268
- Runs: 27
- Hits: 62
- Stats at Baseball Reference

Teams
- Milwaukee Brewers (1986, 1990)

Edgar Díaz Serrano (born February 8, 1964) is a Puerto Rican former professional baseball shortstop. He played during two seasons in Major League Baseball (MLB) for the Milwaukee Brewers. He was signed as an amateur free agent by the Brewers in 1982. Díaz played his first professional season (in American baseball) with their Rookie league Pikeville Brewers in 1982, and his last with the Toronto Blue Jays' Triple-A Syracuse Chiefs in 1995.

== See also ==
- List of Major League Baseball players from Puerto Rico
