= Randy Veres =

American baseball player (1965–2016)

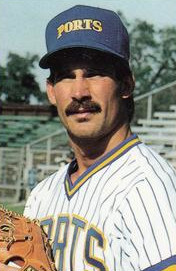
- Veres with the Stockton Ports in 1988
- Pitcher
- Born: November 25, 1965; Sacramento, California, U.S.
- Died: November 13, 2016 (aged 50); Peoria, Arizona, U.S.
- Batted: Right Threw: Right

MLB debut
- July 1, 1989, for the Milwaukee Brewers

Last MLB appearance
- June 23, 1997, for the Kansas City Royals

MLB statistics
- Win–loss record: 9–13
- Earned run average: 4.60
- Strikeouts: 116
- Stats at Baseball Reference

Teams
- Milwaukee Brewers (1989–1990); Chicago Cubs (1994); Florida Marlins (1995); Detroit Tigers (1996); Kansas City Royals (1997)

Randolf Ruhland Veres (November 25, 1965 – November 13, 2016) was an American Major League Baseball pitcher. He was 6'3" tall, weighed 210 pounds and was right-handed. He attended Cordova High School.

Originally drafted in the 32nd round (740th overall) of the 1984 draft by the New York Mets, he did not sign at that time. After spending a season at Sacramento City College, he was drafted by the Milwaukee Brewers second overall in the 1985 January draft, and he decided to sign.

He was a consistent pitcher in the minors, with his perhaps his best season being 1987 with the Beloit Brewers-he went 10–6 that year with an ERA of 3.12.

He made his major league debut against the New York Yankees on July 1, 1989, at the age of 23. He gave up 3 runs in 4+ innings, surrendering seven hits and garnering the loss. That would end up being the only game he'd start in his entire career. He'd end up becoming a journeyman, skipping around between different major league and minor league clubs until 1997. In total, he spent time with the Brewers, Chicago Cubs, Florida Marlins, Detroit Tigers (to whom he'd been traded for minor leaguer Matt Brunson), and Kansas City Royals. In 135 games pitched in his career, he went 9–13 with three saves and a 4.60 ERA. As a batter, he collected zero hits in four at-bats for a .000 batting average. He committed two errors in the field for a .929 fielding percentage. He played his final major league game on June 23, 1997. Veres resided in Peoria, Arizona.

In 1995, Veres had to go on the disabled list with an injured hand, which he hurt pounding on his hotel-room wall trying to get the people in the next room to be quiet.

Veres died on November 13, 2016, and is buried in Holy Redeemer Cemetery in Phoenix, Arizona.
