= Don August =

American baseball player (born 1963)

Donald August
- Pitcher
- Born: July 3, 1963 (age 63); Inglewood, California, U.S.
- Batted: Right Threw: Right

MLB debut
- June 2, 1988, for the Milwaukee Brewers

Last MLB appearance
- October 1, 1991, for the Milwaukee Brewers

MLB statistics
- Win–loss record: 34–30
- Earned run average: 4.64
- Strikeouts: 181
- Stats at Baseball Reference

Teams
- Milwaukee Brewers (1988–1991)
Medals
Men's baseball
Representing United States
Olympic Games
Silver medal – second place	1984 Los Angeles	Team

Donald Glenn August (born July 3, 1963) is an American former Major League Baseball pitcher and writer who played for the Milwaukee Brewers from 1988 to 1991. He lived in Mission Viejo, California and graduated from Capistrano Valley High School.

== Minor pro career ==
August attended Chapman University, where he was a Division II All-American. After competing for the United States at the 1984 Summer Olympics in Los Angeles, he was drafted 17th overall by the Houston Astros. He spent a year in the Astros' minor league system before being traded along with fellow pitcher Mark Knudson to the Brewers on August 15, 1986, in exchange for Danny Darwin.

== Milwaukee Brewers ==
After beginning 1988 with a 4–1 record and a 3.52 ERA for the Denver Zephyrs (later the New Orleans Zephyrs) of the Pacific Coast League, August was called up to the Brewers. He continued his success at the Major League level, going 13–7 with a 3.09 ERA and ranking ninth in the American League in winning percentage. He finished fourth in the voting for AL Rookie of the Year; Oakland Athletics shortstop Walt Weiss won the award.

August suffered a case of the sophomore jinx in 1989, slipping to 12–12 with a 5.31 ERA. He was sent back down to Denver for some time, where he garnered a 1–1 record with a 4.94 ERA. A notable moment came on June 5, when he was the winning pitcher in the inaugural MLB game played at the SkyDome (now Rogers Centre) in Toronto, a 5–3 Brewers victory over the Toronto Blue Jays.

In 1990, he pitched five games, and had a record of 0–3. He started 23 games during the 1991 season, and had a 9–8 record in his final season.

== International career ==
After being released by the Brewers, August pitched in the Detroit Tigers farm system in 1992, mostly with the Triple-A Toledo Mud Hens. After bouncing around in the Indians, Padres, and Pirates' farm systems, August pitched in Taiwan and Italy. He retired from playing in 1996, but continued to coach overseas until the early 2000s.

As of 2023, August is writing a book about playing baseball overseas, tentatively titled "Foreign Affairs".
