= Charlie O'Brien =

American baseball player (born 1960)

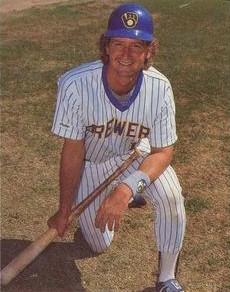
- Catcher
- Born: May 1, 1960 (age 66); Tulsa, Oklahoma, U.S.
- Batted: Right Threw: Right

MLB debut
- June 2, 1985, for the Oakland Athletics

Last MLB appearance
- June 22, 2000, for the Montreal Expos

MLB statistics
- Batting average: .221
- Home runs: 56
- Runs batted in: 261
- Stats at Baseball Reference

Teams
- Oakland Athletics (1985); Milwaukee Brewers (1987–1990); New York Mets (1990–1993); Atlanta Braves (1994–1995); Toronto Blue Jays (1996–1997); Chicago White Sox (1998); Anaheim Angels (1998–1999); Montreal Expos (2000)

Career highlights and awards
- World Series champion (1995)

Charles Hugh O'Brien (born May 1, 1960) is an American former professional baseball player. He played in Major League Baseball as a catcher for the Oakland Athletics (1985), Milwaukee Brewers (1987–90), New York Mets (1990–93), Atlanta Braves (1994–95), Toronto Blue Jays (1996–97), Chicago White Sox (1998), Anaheim Angels (1998–99) and Montreal Expos (2000).

O'Brien was a solid defensive catcher and right-handed batter. He is best remembered for pioneering the hockey-style catcher's mask, which he created while with the Blue Jays. During his tenure with the Braves, O'Brien was notable for being the personal catcher for Baseball Hall of Fame pitcher Greg Maddux.

== Amateur career ==
O'Brien grew up in Tulsa, Oklahoma, beginning to play baseball as a catcher at the age of 5. While growing up in Tulsa, O'Brien attended and graduated from Bishop Kelley High School. The Texas Rangers drafted O'Brien in the 14th round of the 1978 MLB draft, but did not sign him. O'Brien attended Wichita State University, where he played college baseball for the Wichita State Shockers baseball team. The Seattle Mariners drafted O'Brien in the 21st round of the 1981 MLB draft, but O'Brien did not sign, returning to college for his senior year.

In his senior year, O'Brien set school records, hitting 25 home runs and driving in 116 runs as the Shockers reached the finals of the 1982 College World Series. The Oakland Athletics drafted O'Brien in the fifth round of the 1982 MLB draft, and signed him. O'Brien made his MLB debut with the Athletics on June 2, 1985.

== Professional career ==
The Athletics traded O'Brien with Steve Kiefer and minor leaguers Mike Fulmer and Pete Kendrick to the Milwaukee Brewers for Moose Haas. He batted .324 with 15 home runs and 74 RBI with the El Paso Diablos of the Class AA Texas League in 1986.

The Brewers traded O'Brien and a player to be named later (minor leaguer Kevin Carmody) to the New York Mets with players to be named later (Julio Machado and Kevin Brown) in August 1990. He began the 1991 season as the starting catcher, ahead of Mackey Sasser and served as a backup to Todd Hundley when the latter was promoted.

O'Brien agreed to a $370,000 contract for the 1992 season. He was granted free agency for the 1993 season, and he signed with the Atlanta Braves on a two-year contract worth $1.1 million. He was a member of the 1995 World Series champions, and hit a key home run for the Braves during the 1995 National League Championship Series.

After the 1995 season, O'Brien became a free agent and signed with the Toronto Blue Jays on a two-year contract. He signed with the Chicago White Sox for the 1998 season in order to share the catching position with Chad Kreuter, but was traded to the Anaheim Angels for minor leaguers Brian Tokarse and Jason Stockstill in July 1998. The Angels released O'Brien on August 6, 1999, replacing him with Benjie Molina. Now 40, O'Brien signed with the Montreal Expos for the 2000 season, but his success at preventing stolen bases had diminished. The Expos released O'Brien on June 22, 2000.

Over the course of his career, O'Brien caught eleven different Cy Young Award winners: Frank Viola, Dwight Gooden, Bret Saberhagen, David Cone, Greg Maddux, Tom Glavine, John Smoltz, Pat Hentgen, Roger Clemens, Chris Carpenter and Jack McDowell. However, he only caught three of these pitchers during Cy Young seasons—Clemens, Hentgen & Maddux. During Maddux's 1994 and 1995 seasons when he posted ERA's of 1.56 and 1.63 respectively, O'Brien generally served as Maddux's personal catcher. O'Brien later testified at Clemens' perjury trial. He is one of the few players to play both major league Canadian teams, the Toronto Blue Jays and the Montreal Expos.

After getting hit in his mask by two consecutive foul-tip balls in a game, O'Brien had the idea for a new catcher's mask while watching a hockey game. He then worked with Van Velden Mask Inc., of Hamilton, Ontario, Canada, to develop his idea. The new design, called the "All-Star MVP", was approved in 1996 by Major League Baseball.

In his 15-year career, O'Brien batted .221 with 56 home runs and 261 runs batted in.

== Personal life ==
O'Brien is an avid deer hunter.
