= Chris George (right-handed pitcher) =

American baseball player (born 1966)

- Pitcher
- Born: September 24, 1966 (age 59); Pittsburgh, Pennsylvania, U.S.
- Batted: Right Threw: Right

MLB debut
- October 1, 1991, for the Milwaukee Brewers

Last MLB appearance
- October 5, 1991, for the Milwaukee Brewers

MLB statistics
- Win–loss record: 0–0
- Earned run average: 3.00
- Strikeouts: 2
- Stats at Baseball Reference

Teams
- Milwaukee Brewers (1991)

Christopher Sean George (born September 24, 1966) is an American former Major League Baseball pitcher who played two games with the Milwaukee Brewers in 1991.

George was selected as a 1990 California League All-Star and won the 1990 minor league player of the year Ray Scarborough Award. The following season he was selected to be a Texas League All-Star and was ranked by Baseball America as the number one prospect in the Milwaukee Brewers farm system.

During his minor league career he converted all 45 of his save opportunities.

George's Major League debut took place on October 1, 1991, against the Cleveland Indians where he was the starting pitcher in the second game of a doubleheader. He would pitch 5 innings and receive a no-decision in a 6-2 Brewers defeat. Four days later George would make his second and final appearance in the Majors as he pitched the final inning of a 13-4 Brewers win in Boston against the Red Sox; he ended the game by striking out Mike Brumley.
