= Austin Surhoff =

American swimmer

Personal information
- Born: November 27, 1990 (age 35) Milwaukee, Wisconsin, U.S.
- Height: 6 ft 4 in (193 cm)
- Weight: 201 lb (91 kg)

Sport
- Sport: Swimming
- Strokes: Backstroke, freestyle, medley
- Club: University of Texas
Medal record
Men's swimming
Representing the United States
Summer Universiade
Silver medal – second place	2013 Kazan	4×200 m freestyle
Youth World Championships
Silver medal – second place	2008 Monterrey	200 m medley

Austin Surhoff (born November 27, 1990) is an American swimmer. His paternal grandfather Dick Surhoff played in the NBA and was a world class softball player.

== Swimming career ==
As a college swimmer at Texas, Surhoff is a 3-time NCAA champion, winning the 200 yard IM and team title in 2010, and the 4x100 free relay in 2012. He also won the 200 yard IM and 200 yard backstroke at the 2010 Big 12 Championships.

At the 2008 U.S. Olympic Trials, Surhoff placed 13th in the 200 m IM and 24th in the 200 m backstroke. At the 2009 U.S. National Championships, he placed 14th in the 200 m backstroke and 20th in the 100 m backstroke. At the 2012 U.S. Olympic Trials, he bettered his 2008 finish with 4th place in the 200 m IM and was 15th in the 400 m IM.

== Personal ==
Surhoff was born in Milwaukee when his father, B. J. was a member of the Milwaukee Brewers. Surhoff's father played 19 seasons of Major League Baseball between three teams. His mother, Polly, swam for The University of North Carolina and won a silver medal in the women's 400 m individual medley at the 1983 Pan American Games. He currently lives in Charlottesville, Virginia, where he serves as a volunteer assistant coach for the University of Virginia swim team.
