= Brian Moran (baseball) =

American baseball player (born 1988)

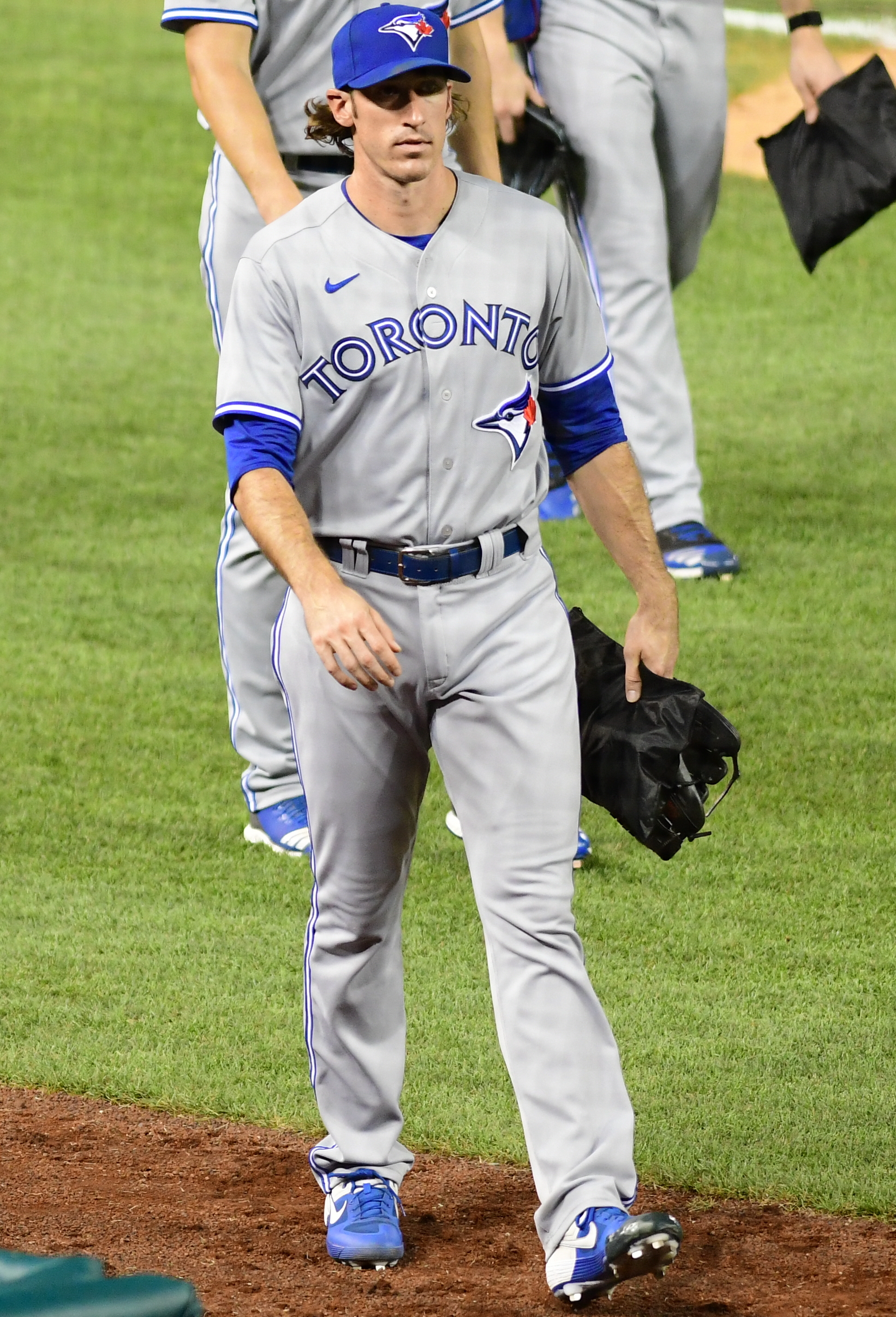
- Moran with the Toronto Blue Jays in 2020

Long Island Ducks – No. 24
- Pitcher
- Born: September 30, 1988 (age 37); Port Chester, New York, U.S.
- Bats: Left Throws: Left

MLB debut
- September 5, 2019, for the Miami Marlins

MLB statistics (through 2022 season)
- Win–loss record: 2–0
- Earned run average: 7.94
- Strikeouts: 17
- Stats at Baseball Reference

Teams
- Miami Marlins (2019); Toronto Blue Jays (2020); Miami Marlins (2020); Los Angeles Angels (2022)

Brian William Moran (born September 30, 1988) is an American professional baseball pitcher for the Long Island Ducks of the Atlantic League of Professional Baseball. Moran played college baseball at the University of North Carolina. He was drafted by the Seattle Mariners in the seventh round of the 2009 Major League Baseball draft. He made his Major League Baseball (MLB) debut in 2019 with the Miami Marlins (for whom he's played in two separate stints) and has also played for the Toronto Blue Jays and Los Angeles Angels.

== Amateur career ==
Moran attended Iona Preparatory School in New Rochelle, New York, where he played on the school's baseball team. Moran pitched and played first base. During his junior year, Moran was named all-county honorable mention. In his junior season, he was named the team's most valuable player and was the county player of the year. During the summers at Iona Prep, Moran played baseball with the ProSwing Pride.

In 2007, Moran began attending the University of North Carolina and played on the school's baseball team as a pitcher. In his first year at North Carolina, Moran compiled a 3.37 earned run average (ERA), and seven strikeouts in 13 games, all in relief. During his second season, Moran compiled a 1–2 record with a 2.76 ERA, two saves, and 72 strikeouts in 40 games, all in relief. In 2009, Moran went 7–1 with a 2.31 ERA, four saves, and 90 strikeouts in 36 games. He was a third-team All-American selection after the season. Moran summed up his time at North Carolina by saying, "It was a dream come true – I can still not believe it that I will not be going back. It was an unbelievable three years. It was everything I could have hoped it could be. I made a lot of good friends and the coaches were awesome. It was an unbelievable experience."

== Professional career ==
=== Seattle Mariners ===
Moran was selected by the Seattle Mariners in the seventh round of the 2009 Major League Baseball draft. He said this about being drafted by Seattle: "I was actually at practice and a lot of the guys shouted down to the bullpen to let me know. Then all the sudden my phone started to get a lot of calls from people saying congratulations. It was pretty cool." He was the first left-handed pitcher taken in the 2009 draft by the Mariners. Dustin Ackley and Kyle Seager, Moran's teammates at North Carolina, were also drafted by the Mariners in 2009.

After being drafted by the Seattle Mariners in 2009, Moran officially signed on June 26, 2009, receiving a US$140,000 signing bonus. He was signed by scout Rob Mammau. Moran made his professional debut in their minor league organization that season with the rookie-level Pulaski Mariners. He went 1–0 with a 3.72 ERA, two saves, and 14 strikeouts in six games, all in relief with Pulaski. Moran was then promoted to the Single-A Clinton LumberKings of the Midwest League. With the LumberKings, he went 0–3 with a 2.89 ERA, and 17 strikeouts in 12 games. Between the two clubs in 2009, Moran compiled a 1–3 record with a 3.18 ERA, two saves, and 31 strikeouts in 28 1/3 innings pitched.

Moran started the 2010 season with the Single-A Clinton LumberKings. Moran was used as a setup pitcher during his time at the Single-A level. He was a league all-star that season. Before the all-star break, Moran led Midwest League pitchers in bases on balls per nine innings pitched (0.93). He praised the development of his split-finger fastball as reason for his success in 2010. It was noted that he was "great friends" with his former University of North Carolina teammate and then-LumberKings teammate Kyle Seager. With the LumberKings that season, Moran went 4–1 with a 1.34 ERA, three saves, and 48 strikeouts in 22 games, all in relief. He was then promoted the High–A level to play with the High Desert Mavericks of the California League. With High Desert, Moran went 2–0 with a 1.42 ERA, one save, and 29 strikeouts in 17 games, all in relief. Finally that season, Moran played with the Double-A West Tenn Diamond Jaxx of the Southern League, compiling a 13.50 ERA in two games. Between the three clubs, Moran went 6–1 with a 1.73 ERA, four saves, and 78 strikeouts in 67 2/3 innings pitched.

Kyle Seager, Moran's teammate with the Clinton LumberKings, described his pitching delivery as a "shot put" release. Moran has stated that he developed his split-finger fast ball out of college, and that it has been effective in professional baseball.

He was selected by the Toronto Blue Jays on December 12, 2013, in the 2013 Rule 5 draft and then traded to the Los Angeles Angels of Anaheim. On April 8, it was announced that Moran would undergo Tommy John surgery and would miss the entire 2014 season, meaning that Rule 5 restrictions will apply to him in 2015. The Angels returned him to the Mariners on October 30, 2014. He was selected in the Rule 5 draft in 2015 by the Cleveland Indians but again returned to the Mariners.

=== Bridgeport Bluefish ===
On April 7, 2016, Moran signed with the Bridgeport Bluefish of the Atlantic League of Professional Baseball. In 38 relief appearances for the Bluefish, Moran recorded a 3.12 ERA with 42 strikeouts across 34 2/3 innings of work.

=== Atlanta Braves ===
On August 10, 2016, the Atlanta Braves signed Moran to a minor league contract. He made 6 appearances for the Triple–A Gwinnett Braves down the stretch, logging a 5.06 ERA with only one strikeout across 5 1/3 innings.

=== Bridgeport Bluefish (second stint) ===
At the 2016 Winter Meetings, on December 8, the Baltimore Orioles selected Moran from the Braves in the minor league phase of the Rule 5 draft. He was released by the Orioles organization prior to the season on April 1, 2017.

On April 11, 2017, Moran signed again with the Bridgeport Bluefish of the Atlantic League of Professional Baseball. In 29 games out of the bullpen, he registered a 2.33 ERA with 33 strikeouts in 19 1/3 innings pitched.

=== Los Angeles Dodgers ===
On July 15, 2017, Moran signed a minor league contract with the Los Angeles Dodgers organization. He made 19 appearances for the Double–A Tulsa Drillers, and posted a stellar 1.89 ERA with 27 strikeouts in 19.0 innings of work. On November 1, Moran was drafted by the Sugar Land Skeeters in the Bridgeport Bluefish dispersal draft.

Moran returned to Tulsa in 2018, also appearing in six games for the Triple–A Oklahoma City Dodgers. In 22 contests in Double–A, he accumulated a 3.71 ERA with 34 strikeouts and 3 saves across 26 2/3 innings of work. On July 14, 2018, Moran was released by the Dodgers organization.

=== Colorado Rockies ===
On July 15, 2018, Moran signed a minor league with the Colorado Rockies. In 19 games for the Double–A Hartford Yard Goats, he recorded a 2.42 ERA with 32 strikeouts across 22 1/3 innings of work. Moran became a free agent following the season on November 2.

=== Miami Marlins ===
On November 12, 2018, Moran signed a minor league deal with the Miami Marlins with an invite to spring training. He was assigned to Triple-A New Orleans to start the 2019 season. On September 3, the Marlins selected Moran's contract and promoted him to the major leagues. Moran made his major league debut on September 5 versus the Pittsburgh Pirates, pitching one scoreless inning in relief while striking out one batter and earning the win. The strikeout was of his brother Colin. The Moran brother match up was the first time since 1900 that a brother faced off against his sibling in his major league debut. Moran was designated for assignment on January 15, 2020, and released on January 17.

=== Toronto Blue Jays ===
On February 7, 2020, Moran signed a minor league deal with the Toronto Blue Jays. He made his Blue Jays debut on July 25, recording two outs.

=== Miami Marlins (second stint) ===
On August 2, 2020, Moran was claimed off waivers by the Miami Marlins. On October 28, after being activated from the 60-day injured list, Moran was designated for assignment—which he rejected—and became a free agent.

=== Tampa Bay Rays ===
On February 12, 2021, Moran signed a minor league contract with the Tampa Bay Rays organization that included an invitation to Spring Training. Moran spent the year with the Triple-A Durham Bulls, posting a 2.16 ERA with 65 strikeouts in 53 appearances. He elected free agency following the season on November 7.

=== Los Angeles Angels ===
On November 24, 2021, Moran signed a minor league contract with the Los Angeles Angels. On April 10, 2022, the Angels selected Moran's contract and added him to the active roster to replace the injured José Quijada. On April 18, 2022, the Angels designated Moran for assignment. On April 21, Moran was sent outright to the Triple-A Salt Lake Bees. Spending the remainder of the season with Triple-A Salt Lake, Moran appeared in 45 games, pitching to a 5-2 record and 4.07 ERA with 52 strikeouts in 48.2 innings of work. He elected free agency following the season on October 7.

=== Atlanta Braves (second stint) ===
On January 30, 2023, Moran signed a minor league contract with the Atlanta Braves organization. In 38 appearances for the Triple–A Gwinnett Stripers, he posted a 3.21 ERA with 58 strikeouts across 47 2/3 innings of work. Moran elected free agency following the season on November 6.

On February 4, 2024, Moran re-signed with Atlanta on a minor league contract. He made 27 appearances for Triple–A Gwinnett, logging a 2–1 record and 5.91 ERA with 48 strikeouts across 45 2/3 innings pitched. Moran elected free agency following the season on November 4.

On December 17, 2024, Moran re-signed with the Atlanta Braves on a minor league contract. He made 23 appearances split between Gwinnett and the Double-A Columbus Clingstones in 2025, accumulating a 1-2 record and 3.36 ERA with 57 strikeouts and one save over 59 innings of work. Moran elected free agency following the season on November 6, 2025.

=== Piratas de Campeche ===
On July 7, 2026, Moran signed with the Piratas de Campeche of the Mexican League. In 10 appearances, he went 2–0 with a 1.76 ERA and 18 strikeouts across 15 1/3 innings pitched.

=== Long Island Ducks ===
On August 28, 2026, Moran signed with the Long Island Ducks of the Atlantic League of Professional Baseball.

== Personal life ==
Moran's brother, Colin Moran, is a professional baseball third baseman. His uncles, Rich and B. J. Surhoff, played in Major League Baseball.

== See also ==
- Rule 5 draft results
