= Dick Surhoff =

American basketball player

Personal information
- Born: November 16, 1929 Union City, New Jersey, U.S.
- Died: May 1, 1987 (aged 57) Harrisburg, Pennsylvania, U.S.
- Listed height: 6 ft 4 in (1.93 m)
- Listed weight: 210 lb (95 kg)

Career information
- High school: Grover Cleveland (Queens, New York)
- College: John Marshall College (1948–1950); LIU Brooklyn (1951–1952)
- NBA draft: 1952: 8th round, 75th overall pick
- Drafted by: New York Knicks
- Playing career: 1952–1957
- Position: Small forward / power forward
- Number: 14, 17, 6

Career history
- 1952–1953: New York Knicks
- 1953–1954: Milwaukee Hawks
- 1954–1955: Hazleton Hawks
- 1955–1957: Williamsport Billies

Career highlights
- All-EPBL Second Team (1956)

Career NBA statistics
- Points: 178 (3.1 ppg)
- Rebounds: 94 (1.6 rpg)
- Assists: 32 (0.6 apg)
- Stats at NBA.com
- Stats at Basketball Reference

Richard Clifford Surhoff Jr. (November 16, 1929 – May 1, 1987) was an American professional basketball player. Surhoff was selected in the 1952 NBA draft by the New York Knicks after a collegiate career at Long Island and John Marshall College. He played for two seasons, one for the Knicks and the other for the Milwaukee Hawks.

Surhoff played in the Eastern Professional Basketball League (EPBL) for the Hazleton Hawks and Williamsport Billies from 1954 to 1957. He was selected to the All-EPBL Second Team in 1956.

He would become an avid softball player in Long Island and would work for the town of Rye, New York, in their recreation department. He died due to a short illness in 1987.

Dick Surhoff was the father of professional baseball players Rick and B. J. Surhoff. He was also the grandfather of Brian and Colin Moran.

== Career statistics ==
Legend
GP	Games played	GS	Games started	MPG	Minutes per game
FG%	Field goal percentage	3P%	3-point field goal percentage	FT%	Free throw percentage
RPG	Rebounds per game	APG	Assists per game	SPG	Steals per game
BPG	Blocks per game	PPG	Points per game	**Bold**	Career high

=== NBA ===
==== Regular season ====
Year	Team	GP	MPG	FG%	FT%	RPG	APG	PPG
1952–53	New York	26	7.2	.213	.633	1.0	.3	1.7
1953–54	Milwaukee	**32**	**11.2**	**.333**	**.758**	**2.2**	**.7**	**4.2**
Career		58	9.4	.295	.717	1.6	.6	3.1

==== Playoffs ====
Year	Team	GP	MPG	FG%	FT%	RPG	APG	PPG
1953	New York	4	3.3	.500	–	.5	.5	1.0
