= Jim Hunter (baseball) =

American baseball player (born 1964)

- Pitcher
- Born: June 22, 1964 (age 61); Jersey City, New Jersey, U.S.
- Batted: Right Threw: Right

MLB debut
- May 17, 1991, for the Milwaukee Brewers

Last MLB appearance
- August 6, 1991, for the Milwaukee Brewers

MLB statistics
- Games pitched: 8
- Win–loss record: 0–5
- Earned run average: 7.26
- Strikeouts: 14
- Stats at Baseball Reference

Teams
- Milwaukee Brewers (1991)

James MacGregor Hunter (born June 22, 1964) is an American former Major League baseball pitcher who played eight games with the Milwaukee Brewers during the 1991 MLB season.

The Montreal Expos originally drafted Hunter out of the University of Georgia in 1985. The Brewers bought his contract in the following year. However, he did not make his Major League debut until 1991. He played in a total of eight games, starting in six of those, and posted an 0–5 record with a 7.26 ERA. Hunter was granted free agency that same October and did not play for another Major League club.
