= George Canale =

American baseball player (born 1965)

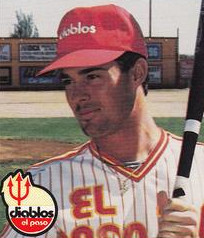
- Canale in 1988
- First baseman
- Born: August 11, 1965 (age 60); Memphis, Tennessee, U.S.
- Batted: Left Threw: Right

MLB debut
- September 3, 1989, for the Milwaukee Brewers

Last MLB appearance
- October 5, 1991, for the Milwaukee Brewers

MLB statistics
- Batting average: .164
- Runs: 15
- Hits: 12

CPBL statistics
- Batting average: .325
- Home runs: 22
- Runs batted in: 77

KBO statistics
- Batting average: .184
- Home runs: 1
- Runs batted in: 3
- Stats at Baseball Reference

Teams
- Milwaukee Brewers (1989–1991); Wei Chuan Dragons (1997–1998); Hyundai Unicorns (1999)

Career highlights and awards
- Taiwan Series champion (1997)

George Anthony Canale (born August 11, 1965) is an American former Major League Baseball first baseman. He played Major League Baseball for three seasons with the Milwaukee Brewers.

George Canale graduated from Cave Spring High School (Roanoke, Virginia) in 1983 and attended Virginia Tech. from 1984 to 1986. George hit 76 home runs during his collegiate career, currently 1st all-time at Virginia Tech and 7th all-time in Division I NCAA baseball. During the 1986 season, George Canale hit the most home runs in Division I baseball with 29 home runs. The same year, George was chosen as an All-American first baseman on the 1986 College Baseball All-America Team. His accomplishment led to his induction to the Virginia Tech Sports Hall of Fame.

George was drafted by the Brewers in the 6th round of the 1986 amateur draft. Canale played his first professional season with their rookie league Helena Gold Sox in 1986, and his last with the Pittsburgh Pirates' Triple-A Nashville Sounds in 1998.

== See also ==
- 1986 College Baseball All-America Team
