= Kevin Brown (left-handed pitcher) =

American baseball player (born 1966)

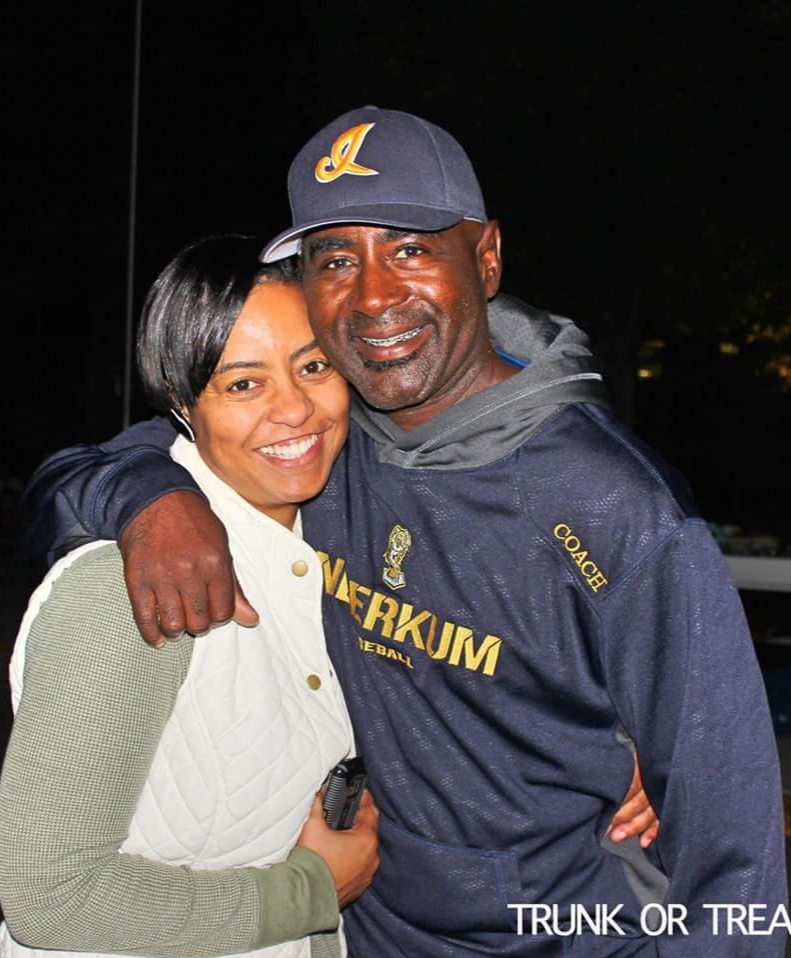
- Brown (right) and his wife in 2009
- Pitcher
- Born: March 5, 1966 (age 60); Oroville, California, U.S.
- Batted: Left Threw: Left

MLB debut
- July 27, 1990, for the New York Mets

Last MLB appearance
- April 8, 1992, for the Seattle Mariners

MLB statistics
- Win–loss record: 3–5
- Earned run average: 4.82
- Strikeouts: 44
- Stats at Baseball Reference

Teams
- New York Mets (1990); Milwaukee Brewers (1990–1991); Seattle Mariners (1992)

Kevin Dewayne Brown (born March 5, 1966) is an American former professional baseball pitcher. He played in Major League Baseball (MLB) from 1990 to 1992 for the New York Mets, Milwaukee Brewers, and Seattle Mariners.

== Playing career ==
Brown attended Oroville High School in Oroville, California, where he excelled in baseball and basketball. He then played college baseball at Sacramento City College.

The Atlanta Braves selected Brown with the second overall pick in the January phase of the 1986 MLB draft. Atlanta traded him to the New York Mets the following year as the player to be named later (PTBNL) in an earlier trade sending Terry Blocker to Atlanta.

Brown made his MLB debut for the Mets in July 1990, pitching in two games. In September, he and Julio Machado traded to the Brewers as PTBNLs in an August trade for Charlie O'Brien. Brown pitched in five games for Milwaukee to end 1990, then a career-high 15 MLB games in 1991. The Mariners claimed Brown off waivers in April 1992, and he played in two games in his final MLB season. He finished his major league career with a 4.82 earned run average in 89 2/3 innings.

Brown continued to pitch in the minors. He didn't pitch in 1994, then suffered a career-ending shoulder injury in 1995 with the Omaha Royals.

== Personal life ==
Brown and his wife reside in Sacramento. They have two children and four grandchildren.

Brown was inducted into the Oroville Union High School District Hall of Fame in 2022, alongside his brother, law professor Kendall Thomas. Their father was inducted into the same hall of fame the previous year.

After his playing career, Brown became a pastor and led a non-profit organization in Sacramento.

He has also coached high school varsity baseball.
