= Mark Lee (left-handed pitcher) =

American baseball player (born 1964)

- Pitcher
- Born: July 20, 1964 (age 62); Williston, North Dakota, U.S.
- Batted: Left Threw: Left

MLB debut
- September 8, 1988, for the Kansas City Royals

Last MLB appearance
- September 24, 1995, for the Baltimore Orioles

MLB statistics
- Win–loss record: 5–5
- Earned run average: 3.82
- Strikeouts: 84
- Stats at Baseball Reference

Teams
- Kansas City Royals (1988); Milwaukee Brewers (1990–1991); Baltimore Orioles (1995)

Mark Owen Lee (born July 20, 1964) is an American professional baseball coach and former baseball pitcher. He played in Major League Baseball (MLB) in all or parts of four seasons between 1988 and 1995 for the Kansas City Royals, Milwaukee Brewers, and Baltimore Orioles. As a minor leaguer he was traded with Rey Palacios from the Detroit Tigers to the Royals for Ted Power during the 1988 season.

Lee was hired as the pitching coach of the UCCS Mountain Lions baseball team in 2016 after retiring from a management position with UPS.
