= Julio Machado =

Venezuelan baseball player (born 1965)

- Pitcher
- Born: December 1, 1965 (age 60); San Carlos del Zulia, Venezuela
- Batted: Right Threw: Right

MLB debut
- September 7, 1989, for the New York Mets

Last MLB appearance
- October 6, 1991, for the Milwaukee Brewers

MLB statistics
- Win–loss record: 7–5
- Earned run average: 3.12
- Strikeouts: 151
- Stats at Baseball Reference

Teams
- New York Mets (1989–1990); Milwaukee Brewers (1990–1991)

Julio Segundo Machado Rondón (born December 1, 1965) is a Venezuelan former Major League Baseball (MLB) right-handed relief pitcher who played for the New York Mets (1989–1990) and Milwaukee Brewers (1990–1991). Machado's MLB career was cut short when he was imprisoned on involuntary murder charges in Venezuela. He later coached and played in Venezuelan winter baseball leagues.

== MLB career ==
Machado started his career with the New York Mets. He made his MLB debut in 1989 and started the 1990 season with the Mets as well. He was demoted to the Triple-A Tidewater Tides, where he saved eight games before being recalled to the Mets in July. At the time, the Mets were looking for consistent right-handed relief pitchers, having traded Roger McDowell the previous year.

Later that season, Machado was traded to the Brewers, along with pitcher Kevin Brown, in exchange for catcher Charlie O'Brien and a minor league player.

Machado had a decent fastball, good control and willingness to challenge hitters. He also pitched a better-than-average curveball and a slider.

In a three-year career, Machado posted a 7–5 record with 151 strikeouts and a 3.12 ERA in 147 innings.

== Shooting ==
Spending the 1991 offseason in his homeland, Machado fatally shot a woman following an auto accident on December 8. More than two weeks later, Machado was missing and the Brewers said that they were planning for 1992 with the assumption that Machado would not be on the team. Though he was described as a fugitive, Venezuelan reporters said that Machado would probably turn himself in after the holidays. He was held in a Caracas prison while an investigation was carried out from the middle of January to early March. He admitted that he fired the shots, but he said that he did so in self-defense, afraid that he was being robbed.

When Machado was granted conditional freedom pending a trial on charges of involuntary murder, he was not allowed to leave Venezuela. Shortly thereafter, thieves stole the car of the prosecutor in Machado's case and they set it on fire. Machado was convicted and, following appeals, he was sentenced to 12 years in 1996. He was released in 2000.

== See also ==
- List of players from Venezuela in Major League Baseball
