= B. J. Surhoff =

American baseball player (born 1964)

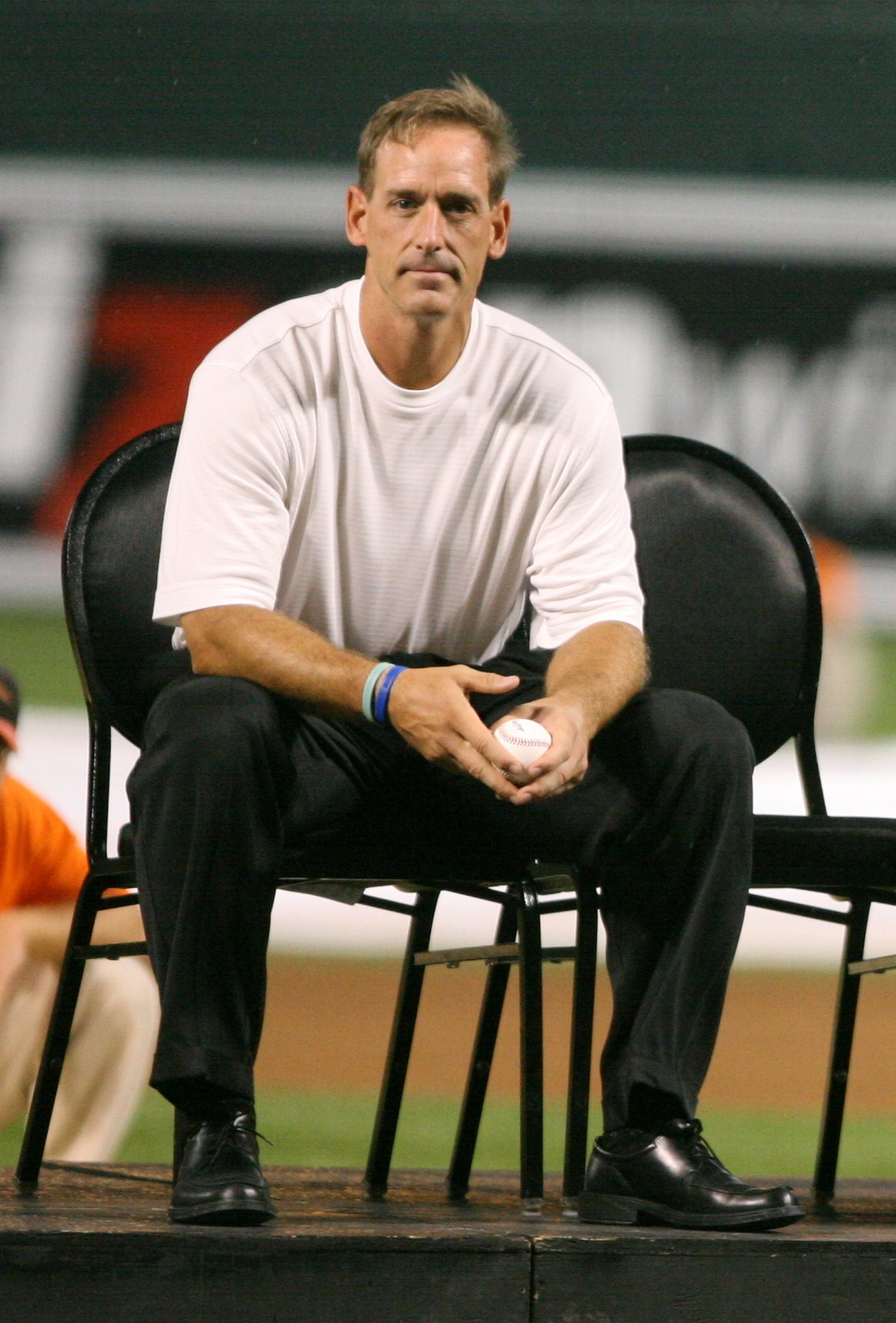
- Left fielder / Catcher / Third baseman
- Born: August 4, 1964 (age 62); The Bronx, New York, U.S.
- Batted: Left Threw: Right

MLB debut
- April 8, 1987, for the Milwaukee Brewers

Last MLB appearance
- October 2, 2005, for the Baltimore Orioles

MLB statistics
- Batting average: .282
- Hits: 2,326
- Home runs: 188
- Runs batted in: 1,153
- Stats at Baseball Reference

Teams
- Milwaukee Brewers (1987–1995); Baltimore Orioles (1996–2000); Atlanta Braves (2000–2002); Baltimore Orioles (2003–2005)

Career highlights and awards
- All-Star (1999); Milwaukee Brewers Wall of Honor; Baltimore Orioles Hall of Fame
Medals
Men's baseball
Representing United States
Olympic Games
Silver medal – second place	1984 Los Angeles	Team
Intercontinental Cup
Silver medal – second place	1983 Brussels	Team
Pan American Games
Bronze medal – third place	1983 Caracas	Team

William James "B. J." Surhoff (born August 4, 1964) is an American former catcher, outfielder, first baseman, third baseman, and designated hitter in Major League Baseball (MLB). Over his 18-year MLB career, he played every position except pitcher. After playing for the Orioles from 1996 to 2000, he rejoined the team in 2003 and played through the 2005 season. He started his career with the Milwaukee Brewers (1987–1995) and also played for the Atlanta Braves (2000–2002). Surhoff began his career as a catcher, and after playing third base in the mid-1990s, shifted to become primarily a left fielder. Surhoff was the first-overall pick in the 1985 MLB draft.

== Baseball career ==
Born in the Bronx, Surhoff attended Rye High School in Westchester, New York. After high school he attended the University of North Carolina at Chapel Hill. In 1983, he played collegiate summer baseball with the Wareham Gatemen of the Cape Cod Baseball League. Surhoff was honored as the 1985 ACC Male Athlete of the Year, and played on the first (1984) U.S. Olympic baseball team. He was a two-time first team All-American at UNC and his career batting average of .392 was a school record until Dustin Ackley set the mark at .412 in 2009.

Surhoff was selected by the Brewers with the first overall pick of the 1985 Major League Baseball draft. He was a versatile player, having appeared at every position except pitcher over the course of his career. He had 2,326 hits, 188 home runs and 1,153 runs batted in during his career. Although always a consistent hitter, having hit over .280 in 12 of his 19 seasons, Surhoff's finest season was his 1999 campaign with the Orioles, in which he led the American League in at-bats (673), ranked second in hits (207), was selected to the American League All-Star team, and ultimately won Most Valuable Oriole honors for the season, becoming one of five players to get 200 or more hits in a season for the team. He also participated in the Home Run Derby. In other notable seasons, he finished sixth in the AL in doubles in 1993 with the Brewers and finished fifth in batting average in the AL with the Brewers in 1995 with a .320 average.

In 2007, Surhoff was elected to the Orioles Hall of Fame, with the official induction ceremony occurring before the start of the Orioles–Twins game on August 25, 2007, at Oriole Park at Camden Yards.

== Personal life ==
Surhoff's father Dick played two years in the NBA in 1952–1953 and 1953–1954 and his brother Rich appeared in nine games in 1985 as a relief pitcher for the Philadelphia Phillies and the Texas Rangers. He also has a brother named Mark who lives in Rye, New York. His son, Austin, swam at the University of Texas and won the 200 individual medley and 200 backstroke at the 2010 Big 12 Championships. Then he won the 200 Individual Medley national title a month later.

Surhoff lives in Cockeysville, Maryland, with his wife Polly and their four children. He is the president of Pathfinders for Autism, a Hunt Valley support group for families with autistic children. Surhoff's son, Mason, is autistic. In March 2026, Surhoff spoke at a protest at the Maryland State House against Governor Wes Moore's proposed cuts to the Developmental Disabilities Administration.

Surhoff is the uncle of former UNC third-team All-American pitcher Brian Moran, and former Astro third baseman/outfielder Colin Moran. In 2008, 2009 and 2012 Surhoff was a spring training instructor for the Baltimore Orioles.

== See also ==
- List of Major League Baseball career hits leaders
- List of Major League Baseball career doubles leaders
- List of Major League Baseball career runs scored leaders
- List of Major League Baseball career runs batted in leaders
