= Robin Yount =

American baseball player (born 1955)

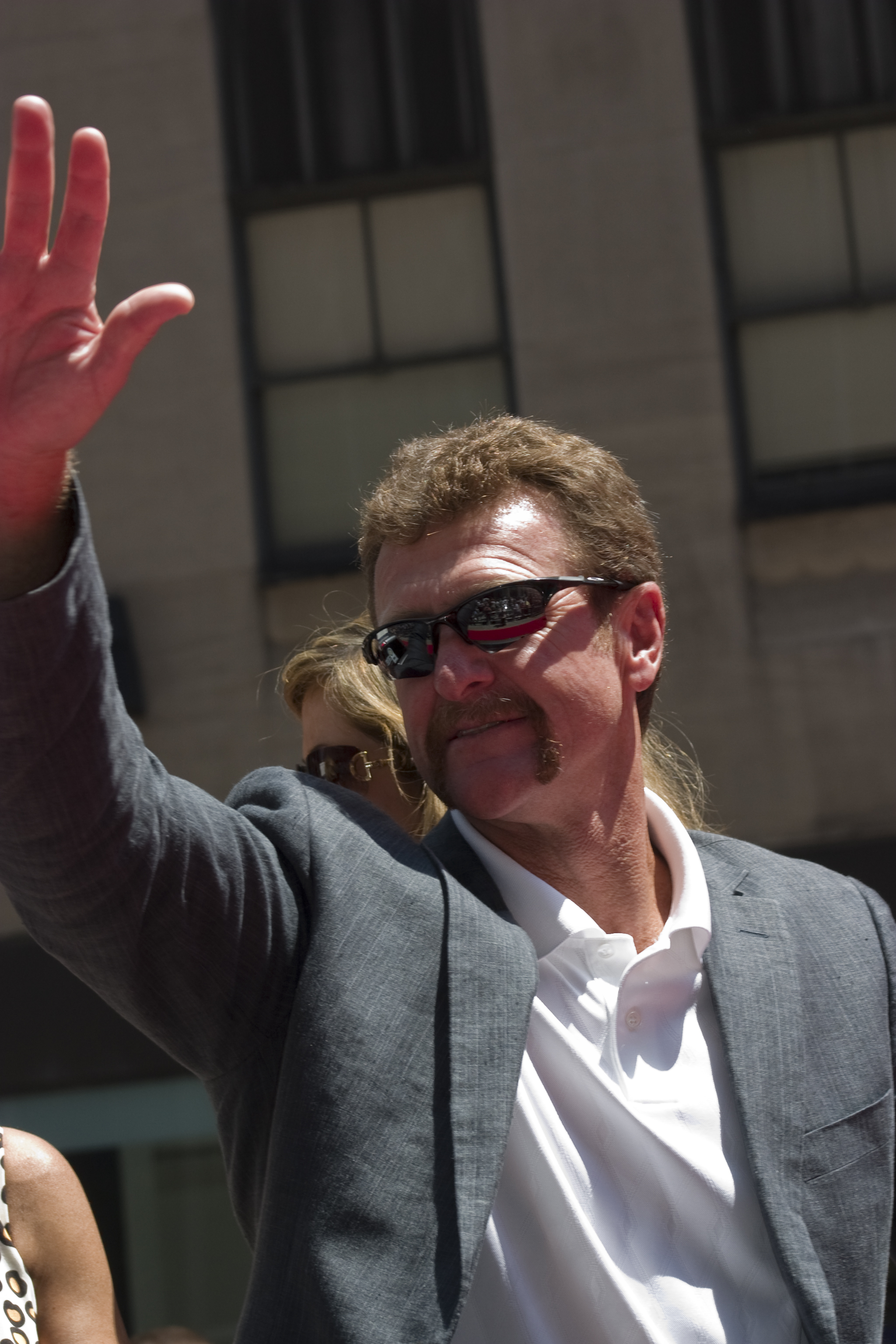
- Yount in 2008
- Shortstop / Center fielder
- Born: September 16, 1955 (age 71); Danville, Illinois, U.S.
- Batted: Right Threw: Right

MLB debut
- April 5, 1974, for the Milwaukee Brewers

Last MLB appearance
- October 3, 1993, for the Milwaukee Brewers

MLB statistics
- Batting average: .285
- Hits: 3,142
- Home runs: 251
- Runs batted in: 1,406
- Stats at Baseball Reference

Teams
- Milwaukee Brewers (1974–1993)

Career highlights and awards
- 3× All-Star (1980, 1982, 1983); 2× AL MVP (1982, 1989); Gold Glove Award (1982); 3× Silver Slugger Award (1980, 1982, 1989); Milwaukee Brewers No. 19 retired; Milwaukee Brewers Wall of Honor; American Family Field Walk of Fame

Member of the National

Baseball Hall of Fame
- Induction: 1999
- Vote: 77.5% (first ballot)

Robin R. Yount (/ˈjaʊnt/; born September 16, 1955), nicknamed "the Kid" and "Rockin' Robin", is an American former professional baseball player. He spent his entire 20-year career in Major League Baseball as a shortstop and center fielder for the Milwaukee Brewers from 1974 to 1993.

Yount was drafted in 1973 and advanced to the major leagues one year later at the age of 18. He won two American League Most Valuable Player awards. In 1982, he led the Brewers to a World Series appearance. Yount was elected to the Baseball Hall of Fame in 1999 in his first year of eligibility. Since his retirement as a player, he has held several roles as a coach.

== Early life ==
Robin R. Yount was born September 16, 1955, in Danville, Illinois. He lived briefly in Covington, Indiana, then his family moved to southern California when he was an infant; his father got a job testing rocket engines with Rocketdyne. Robin attended William Howard Taft High School in Woodland Hills, California.

== Professional career ==
=== Draft and minor leagues ===
Yount was the third pick overall in the June 1973 Major League Baseball draft, one slot ahead of fellow Hall of Famer and 3,000 hit club member Dave Winfield.

=== Milwaukee Brewers (1974–1993) ===
Yount made his major league debut the following April, at 18 years old. After going hitless in his first four games, Yount hit a game-winning home run in his sixth. Yount is the last 18-year-old to hit a home run in the Major Leagues (Andruw Jones, Mike Trout, Bryce Harper, and Juan Soto are the most recent teenagers to hit Major League home runs, but did so as 19-year-olds). On September 14, 1975 (two days before his 20th birthday), Yount broke Mel Ott's 47-year-old record for most games played in the major leagues before turning 20.

Yount courted controversy in the winter of 1978. He threatened to retire from the game and take up professional golf rather than be underpaid or moved to the outfield by the Brewers. Early in the season, Paul Molitor was called up from the Brewers Class A affiliate to the major league team because of Yount's absence. Yount's demands were met; when he returned to the team, Molitor was moved from shortstop to second base to make room for Yount.

He was an early proponent of weight training – then uncommon in baseball – and by 1980 Yount's power hitting had improved, particularly for a shortstop. Yount was an All-Star in 1980, 1982, and 1983. No other Brewer was voted a starter in consecutive years until Ryan Braun started each year between 2008 and 2011. Before his 26th birthday, Yount had accumulated 1,153 hits, the seventh highest total for a 25-year-old player in MLB history, ahead of Baseball Hall of Fame members Hank Aaron (1,137), Jimmie Foxx (1,127) and Rogers Hornsby (1,073).

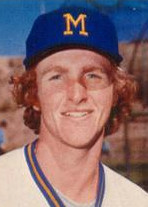
Yount with the Brewers, c. 1977

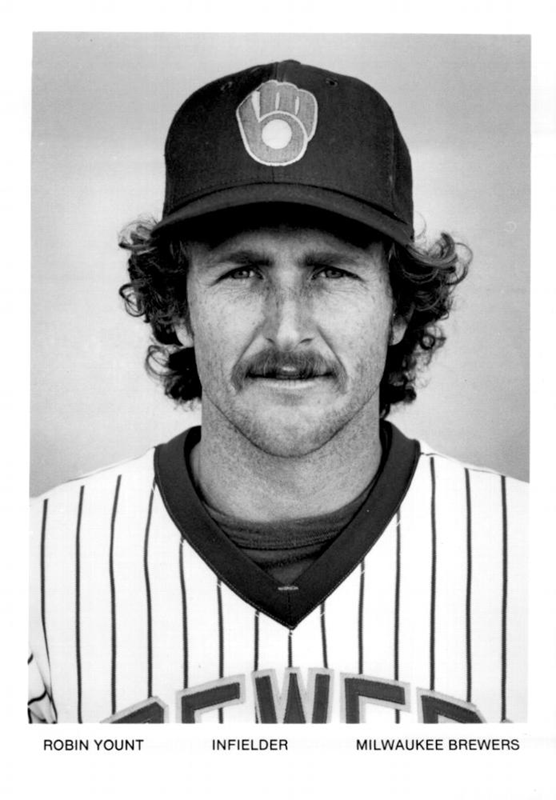
1982 photo of Yount posing for the Milwaukee Brewers

Yount led the American League with 210 hits in 1982. The 1982 AL East race was tied on the final day of the season, with the race coming down to a winner-take-all game between the Brewers and the Baltimore Orioles. With the title on the line, Yount hit home runs in each of his first two at-bats against Orioles starter Jim Palmer. Yount finished with a four-hit game, as the Brewers won 10-2. In addition to his only 200-hit season, he registered career highs with 29 home runs, 114 RBI, and a .331 batting average (.001 behind the league leader, Willie Wilson). Yount finished with a .578 slugging percentage and .957 OPS on his way to gaining 367 total bases – leading the major leagues in all three categories. His slugging percentage was the second highest ever by a shortstop, and his 129 runs set the record for that position.

That year, Yount also won his only Gold Glove Award and his first Most Valuable Player Award. His performance garnered 27 of 28 possible first place votes in the 1982 MVP balloting. The year ended with the Brewers making their first World Series appearance. Although Yount became the only player in history to have two 4-hit games in one World Series, Milwaukee lost to the St. Louis Cardinals in seven games. Yount batted .414 in the Series, with one home run and 6 RBI.

In 1985, a shoulder problem forced Yount to move to the outfield. After splitting time between center field and left field, Yount became the Brewers' regular center fielder in 1986. He played more than 1,200 games in the outfield in his career, with a .990 fielding percentage. He made a game-ending, diving catch to preserve a no-hitter by Juan Nieves early in the 1987 season.

Yount narrowly won a second MVP Award in 1989, making him only the third player to win MVPs at two positions, joining Hank Greenberg and Stan Musial (Alex Rodriguez would later join this group). Yount was the first AL player to win multiple MVP awards in over 25 years, since the Yankees' Roger Maris (1960 and 1961) and Mickey Mantle (1956, 1957, and 1962). Yount collected more hits (1,731) in the decade of the 1980s than any other player.

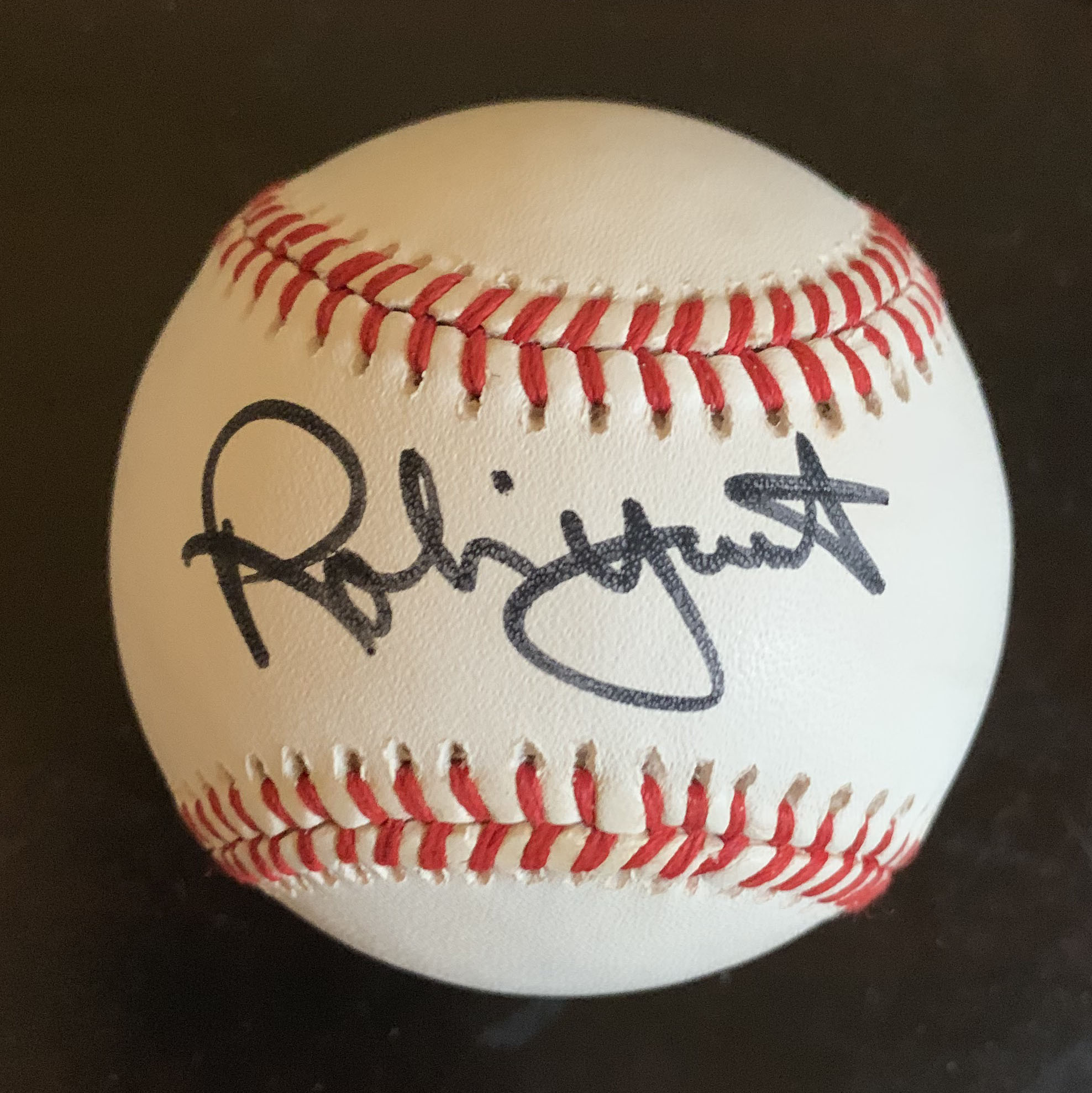
Robin Yount signed baseball circa 1984

After the 1989 season, Yount was a free agent and he spoke with several teams about contract offers. The California Angels were prepared to make a serious offer, but Yount signed a three-year contract with the Brewers worth $9.6 million in February 1990. He cited the fact he was more comfortable in Milwaukee (with Bud Selig as owner) than leaving for a different place. At the start of the 1990 season, he had 2,602 hits in his career, which was fourth among players by age 34 to Ty Cobb, Rogers Hornsby, and Hank Aaron. In 1991, Yount was briefly on the disabled list (DL) with a kidney stone, only the second stint on the DL in his career; the first one was in 1978.

On September 9, 1992, Yount collected his 3,000th career hit, becoming the 17th player (and the third-youngest) to reach the mark. He announced his retirement after the 1993 season. The Brewers retired his number the next year. Yount was elected to the Wisconsin Athletic Hall of Fame in 1995. He was elected to the Baseball Hall of Fame in 1999, his first year of eligibility. That same year, he was included in the balloting for the Major League Baseball All-Century Team, finishing fifth among shortstops.

Yount holds Brewers career records for games, at-bats, runs, hits, doubles, triples, RBIs, total bases, walks and strikeouts. He was the last active major leaguer to have been a teammate of Hank Aaron (1975–1976). He posted a career .285 batting average with 251 home runs, 3,142 hits, 1,632 runs scored, 583 doubles, 126 triples, 1,406 RBI, 271 stolen bases and 966 walks. His 11,008 career at-bats is the ninth-most in Major League Baseball history (through the end of the 2020 season), and he ranks 20th on the all-time hit list. His three All-Star appearances are tied with Ferguson Jenkins for the second-fewest of any Hall of Famer from the All-Star Game era, and he won a second MVP Award in 1989 without making the All-Star Team.

== Coaching career ==
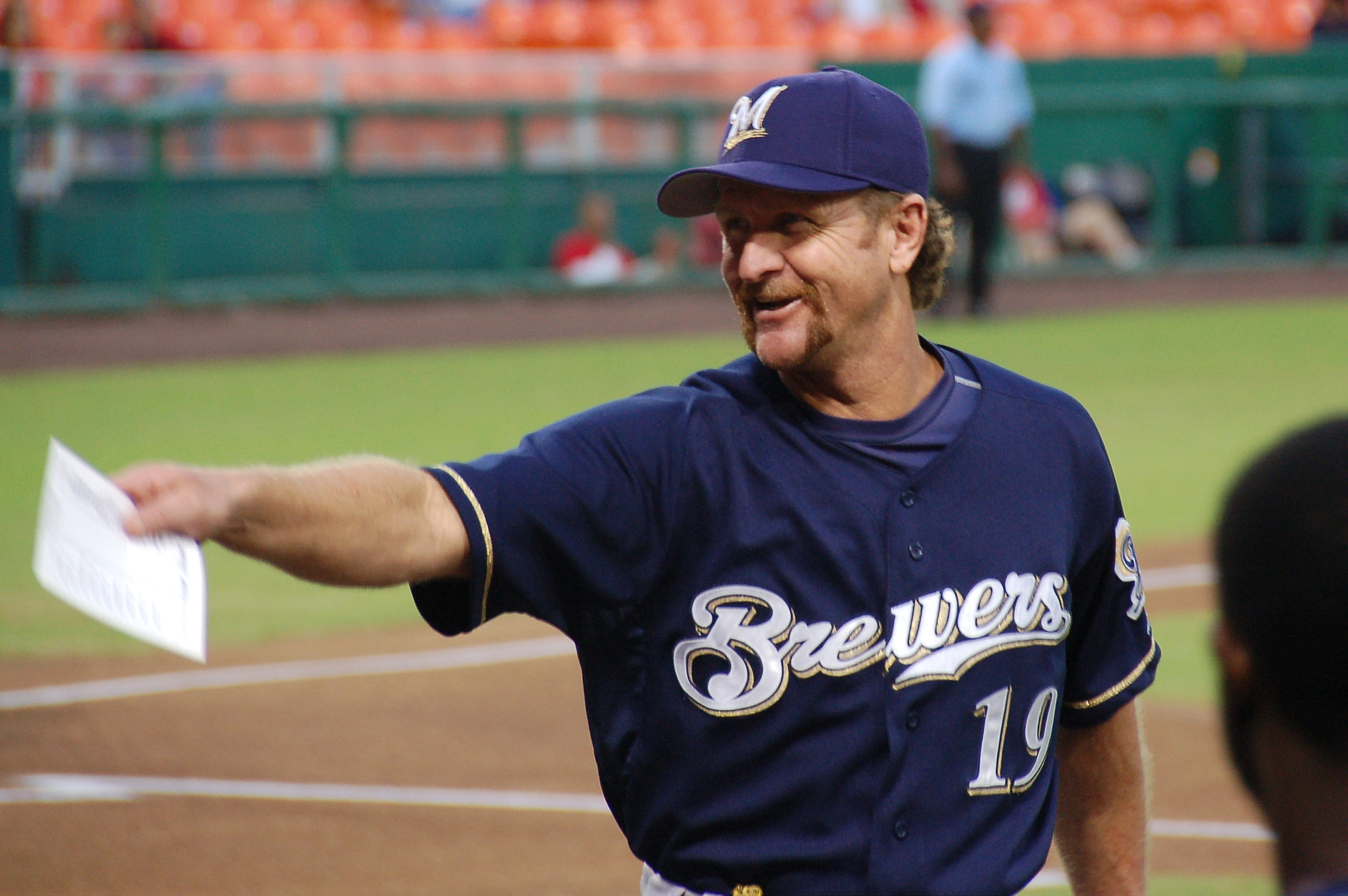
Yount coaching with the Brewers in 2006

Yount served as first base coach and bench coach for the Arizona Diamondbacks from 2002 to 2004. He resigned after the dismissal of Arizona manager Bob Brenly. He, Hank Aaron, Warren Spahn and Bob Uecker threw out the ceremonial first pitches at the 2002 Major League Baseball All-Star Game at Miller Park.

In 2005, Brewers manager Ned Yost convinced Dale Sveum, a teammate of Yount's, to become Milwaukee's new third base coach. Yount followed suit a few weeks later, accepting a post as the Brewers' bench coach. In November 2006, Yount announced he would not return to the team as bench coach for the 2007 season. However, on September 15, 2008, Sveum, by now the team's manager, chose Yount as his bench coach.

In 2012, when Sveum was named the Chicago Cubs new manager, rumors quickly spread that Sveum would ask Yount to coach with him, even though the Brewers and Cubs had become bitter rivals. Sveum very quickly confirmed that he was not even considering such a move. In 2014, Yount was a special instructor in spring training for the Brewers.

== Legacy ==
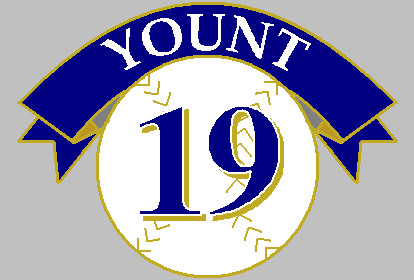
Robin Yount's number 19 was retired by the Milwaukee Brewers in 1994.

Yount is widely considered to be the greatest player in Brewers history. His 77.4 Wins Above Replacement is 17 points higher than anyone else in franchise history. Yount is the only Brewer to win multiple MVP awards and one of three members of the franchise to reach 3,000 hits (Paul Molitor and Hank Aaron) and the only member of the franchise to do it solely as a Brewer. Yount is also the Brewers' all-time leader in games, hits, at-bats, plate appearances, runs, doubles, triples, runs batted in, and walks.

Yount is a popular figure in Milwaukee and often attends Brewers On Deck, the team's annual preseason fan-fest. Yount's number 19 is one of six numbers retired by the Brewers. His statue on the grounds of American Family Field is one of four statues erected by the Brewers. Yount was a charter member of the Milwaukee Brewers Wall of Honor when it was created in 2014.

In September 2026, Brewers manager Pat Murphy proposed naming Christian Yelich as the first team captain in franchise history. Yelich said he would only agree if Yount approved, which Yount did. When the Brewers won the World Series less than one month later, Yount celebrated with the team, embracing Yelich and telling him: "Got the monkey off a lot of our backs.”

== Personal life ==
Yount met his wife at Taft High School. They later reconnected, and have been married since 1979. They have four children.

Yount's older brother Larry was called up to make his debut as a Houston Astros pitcher in 1971. Sent in as a reliever, he experienced elbow pain during warmup pitches and was removed before he threw an official pitch; nevertheless, he is considered to have played in one MLB game. Yount's son, Dustin, played baseball in the minor leagues for several years. Yount's nephew, Austin Yount, played baseball for the Los Angeles Dodgers organization. Another nephew, Cody Yount, played college baseball for the Pepperdine Waves.

Since retiring from baseball, Yount has increased his participation in two of his other passions: professional motorcycle and auto racing. In June 2008, Yount began selling Robinade, a lemonade drink; a portion of the proceeds go to charity. While hunting in Arizona in 2012, Yount accidentally shot friend and former teammate Dale Sveum with his shotgun. Pellets from the blast hit Sveum in the back and ear.

In 2012, Yount became a minority owner of the Lakeshore Chinooks of the Northwoods League, a collegiate summer baseball league. The Chinooks play at Concordia University Wisconsin's Kapco Park, where the 319-foot right-field fence alludes to Yount's number 19.

In 2014, Yount received the Lombardi Award of Excellence, awarded annually by the Vince Lombardi Cancer Foundation to a person who exemplifies the spirit of the acclaimed football coach.

On October 20, 2018, Yount threw out the first pitch before Game 7 of the 2018 National League Championship Series between the Dodgers and Brewers.

On October 23, 2026, Yount threw out the first pitch before Game 1 of the 2026 World Series between the Brewers and Tampa Bay.

== See also ==
- List of Major League Baseball career home run leaders
- List of Major League Baseball doubles records
- DHL Hometown Heroes
- List of Major League Baseball career hits leaders
- List of Major League Baseball career doubles leaders
- List of Major League Baseball career triples leaders
- List of Major League Baseball career runs scored leaders
- List of Major League Baseball career runs batted in leaders
- List of Major League Baseball career stolen bases leaders
- List of Major League Baseball career total bases leaders
- List of Major League Baseball annual doubles leaders
- List of Major League Baseball annual triples leaders
- List of Major League Baseball players who spent their entire career with one franchise
- 3,000 hit club
- List of Major League Baseball players to hit for the cycle
- Yount Monument

Awards and achievements
Preceded by Rollie Fingers; José Canseco	American League Most Valuable Player; 1982; 1989	Succeeded by Cal Ripken Jr. Rickey Henderson
Preceded by Albert Hall	Hitting for the cycle June 12, 1988	Succeeded by Chris Speier
