= 1999 Baseball Hall of Fame balloting =

Elections to the Baseball Hall of Fame

National Baseball

Hall of Fame and Museum
- New inductees: 7
- via BBWAA: 3
- via Veterans Committee: 4
- Total inductees: 244
- Induction date: July 25, 1999

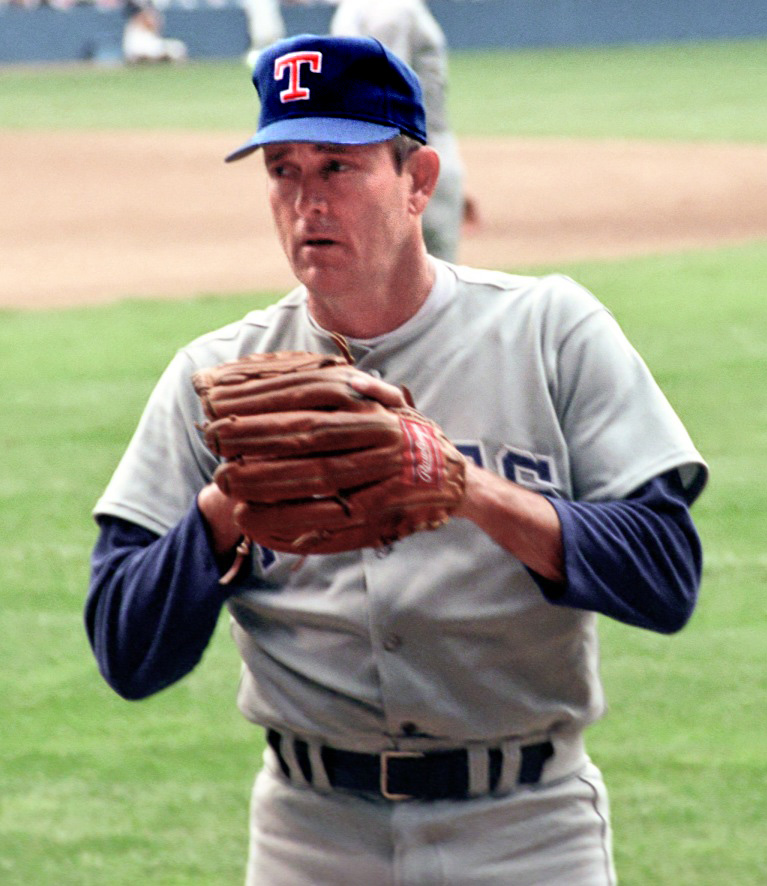
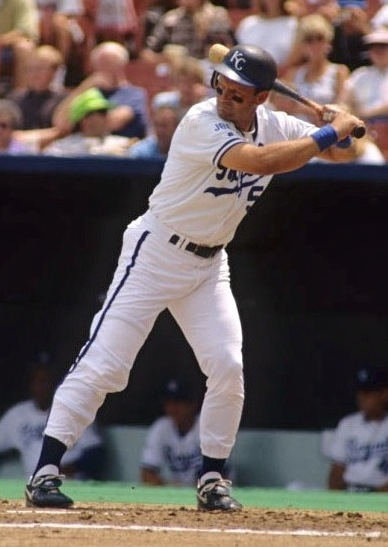
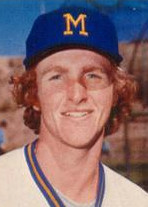
1999 BBWAA inductees (L-R): Nolan Ryan, George Brett, and Robin Yount

Elections to the Baseball Hall of Fame for 1999 followed the system in use since 1995. The Baseball Writers' Association of America (BBWAA) voted by mail to select from recent major league players and elected three: George Brett, Nolan Ryan, and Robin Yount. The Veterans Committee met in closed sessions and selected four people from multiple classified ballots: Orlando Cepeda, Nestor Chylak, Frank Selee, and Smokey Joe Williams.

Brett, Ryan, and Yount were all newly eligible, as they each played their last game in 1993. It was the first time the writers elected more than two first-ballot candidates, other than the five players selected for the inaugural class of 1936.

Induction ceremonies in Cooperstown, New York, were held on July 25, 1999, with George Grande as master of ceremonies and Commissioner of Baseball Bud Selig in attendance.

== BBWAA election ==
The BBWAA was authorized to elect players active in 1979 or later but not after 1993 (final game, 1979 to 1993). There were 28 candidates, 17 returning from the 1998 ballot, where they received at least 5% support, and 11 on the ballot for the first time (†), chosen by a screening committee from players who last appeared in 1993.

The field of newly-eligible candidates, who played their last games during 1993, included 19 All-Stars (10 on the ballot) with a total of 63 All-Star selections. They included 13-time All-Star George Brett, 11-time All-Star Carlton Fisk, 8-time All-Star Nolan Ryan, and 7-time All-Star Dale Murphy. There were four Most Valuable Players in the field (Brett, Murphy, Robin Yount, and George Bell, of whom Murphy and Yount won two MVPs) and two Rookies of the Year (Fisk and Alfredo Griffin).

All 10-year members of the BBWAA were eligible to participate by voting for as many as 10 candidates; any candidate receiving votes on at least 75% of the ballots returned would be honored with induction to the Hall. The results were announced on January 5, 1999. A total of 497 ballots were cast, so 373 votes were required for election. A total of 3,348 individual votes were cast, an average of 6.74 per ballot. Three players were elected: Ryan, Brett, and Yount. Sixteen players who last appeared from 1980 to 1993 were forwarded to next year.

Candidates who received less than 5% support, or 25 votes, would not appear on future BBWAA ballots (*). They were also eliminated, at the time, from future consideration by the Veterans Committee. (Note: Arrangements for inducting "veteran" players, those inactive for about 25 years or more, have since been revised. Since 2001, a player's eligibility for the veterans ballots does not depend on performance in the BBWAA elections.) Mickey Lolich and Minnie Miñoso were on the ballot for the 15th and final time, although Miñoso's term as a candidate was not consecutive.

Key
	Elected to the Hall of Fame on this ballot (named in **bold italics**).
	Elected subsequently, as of 2025 (named in plain italics).
	Renominated for the 2000 BBWAA election by adequate performance on this ballot and has not been elected, as of 2025.
	Eliminated from annual BBWAA consideration by poor performance or expiration on this ballot and has not been elected, as of 2025.
†	First time on the BBWAA ballot.
*	Eliminated from annual BBWAA consideration by poor performance or expiration on this ballot.

Player	Votes	Percent	Changes	Year
**Nolan Ryan**†	**491**	**98.8**	-	1st
**George Brett**†	**488**	**98.2**	-	1st
**Robin Yount**†	**385**	**77.5**	-	1st
Carlton Fisk†	330	66.4	-	1st
Tony Pérez	302	60.8	▼7.1%	8th
Gary Carter	168	33.8	▼8.5%	2nd
Steve Garvey	150	30.2	▼11.0%	7th
Jim Rice	146	29.4	▼13.5%	5th
Bruce Sutter	121	24.3	▼6.8%	6th
Jim Kaat	100	20.1	▼7.2%	11th
Dale Murphy†	96	19.3	-	1st
Tommy John	93	18.7	▼8.6%	5th
Dave Parker	80	16.1	▼8.4%	3rd
Minnie Miñoso	73	14.7	▼1.4%	15th
Bert Blyleven	70	14.1	▼3.4%	2nd
Dave Concepción	59	11.2	▼5.7%	6th
Luis Tiant	53	10.7	▼2.4%	12th
Keith Hernandez	34	6.8	▼4.0%	4th
Ron Guidry	31	6.2	▼1.6%	6th
Bob Boone	27	5.4	▼0.1%	4th
Mickey Lolich	26	5.2	▼3.0%	15th
Dwight Evans*	18	3.6	▼7.6%	3rd
George Bell†*	6	1.2	-	1st
John Candelaria†*	1	0.2	-	1st
Mike Boddicker†*	0	0.0	-	1st
Charlie Leibrandt†*	0	0.0	-	1st
Frank Tanana†*	0	0.0	-	1st
Mike Witt†*	0	0.0	-	1st

Newly-eligible players who did not reach the ballot included Juan Agosto, Wally Backman, Steve Balboni, Randy Bush, Iván Calderón, Henry Cotto, Glenn Davis, Ken Dayley, Frank DiPino, Bill Doran, Dan Gladden, Alfredo Griffin, Kelly Gruber, Neal Heaton, Steve Lake, Terry Leach, Bob McClure, Gene Nelson, Pete O'Brien, Geno Petralli, Ted Power, John Russell, Bryn Smith, Tim Teufel, Dickie Thon, José Uribe, Bob Walk, Chico Walker, Curtis Wilkerson, Glenn Wilson, Curt Young, and Matt Young.

== Veterans Committee ==
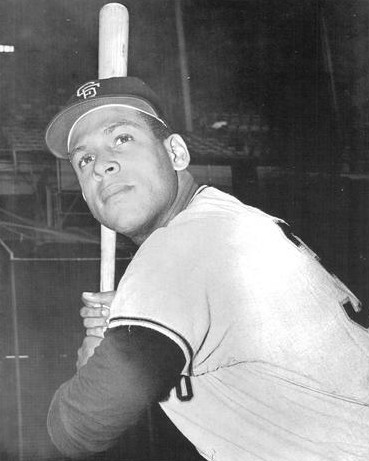
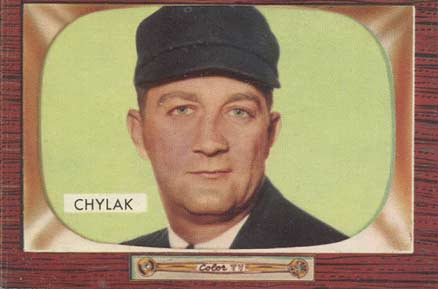
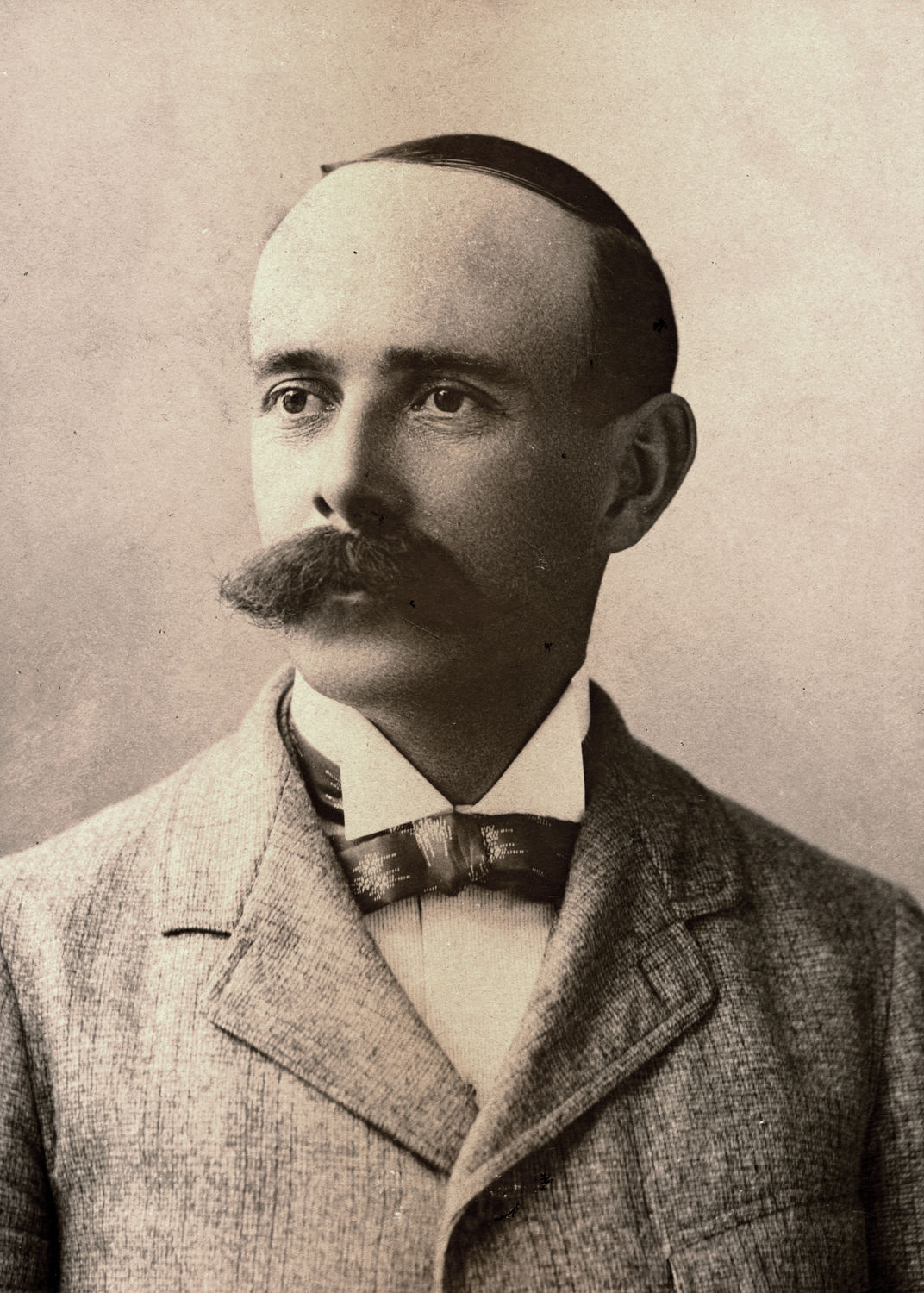
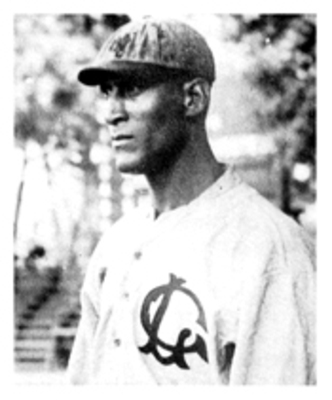
1999 Veterans Committee inductees (L-R): Orlando Cepeda, Nestor Chylak, Frank Selee, and Smokey Joe Williams

The Veterans Committee met in closed sessions to elect as many as two executives, managers, umpires, and older major league players—the categories considered in all its meetings since 1953.

The older players eligible were those with 10 major league seasons beginning 1945 or earlier; those who received at least 100 votes from the BBWAA in an election up to 1990; and those who received at least 60% support in an election beginning 1991. Players on Major League Baseball's ineligible list were also ineligible for election.

By an arrangement since 1995, the committee separately considered candidates from the Negro leagues and from the 19th century with authority to select one from each of those two special ballots. It elected four people, the maximum number permitted: first baseman Orlando Cepeda from the 1960s, umpire Nestor Chylak, pitcher Smokey Joe Williams from the Negro leagues, and manager Frank Selee from the 19th century.

== J. G. Taylor Spink Award ==
Bob Stevens received the J. G. Taylor Spink Award honoring a baseball writer. (The award was voted at the December 1998 meeting of the BBWAA, dated 1998, and conferred in the summer 1999 ceremonies.)

== Ford C. Frick Award ==
Arch McDonald posthumously received the Ford C. Frick Award honoring a baseball broadcaster.
