= Ten-Cent Beer Night =

1974 Major League Baseball promotion

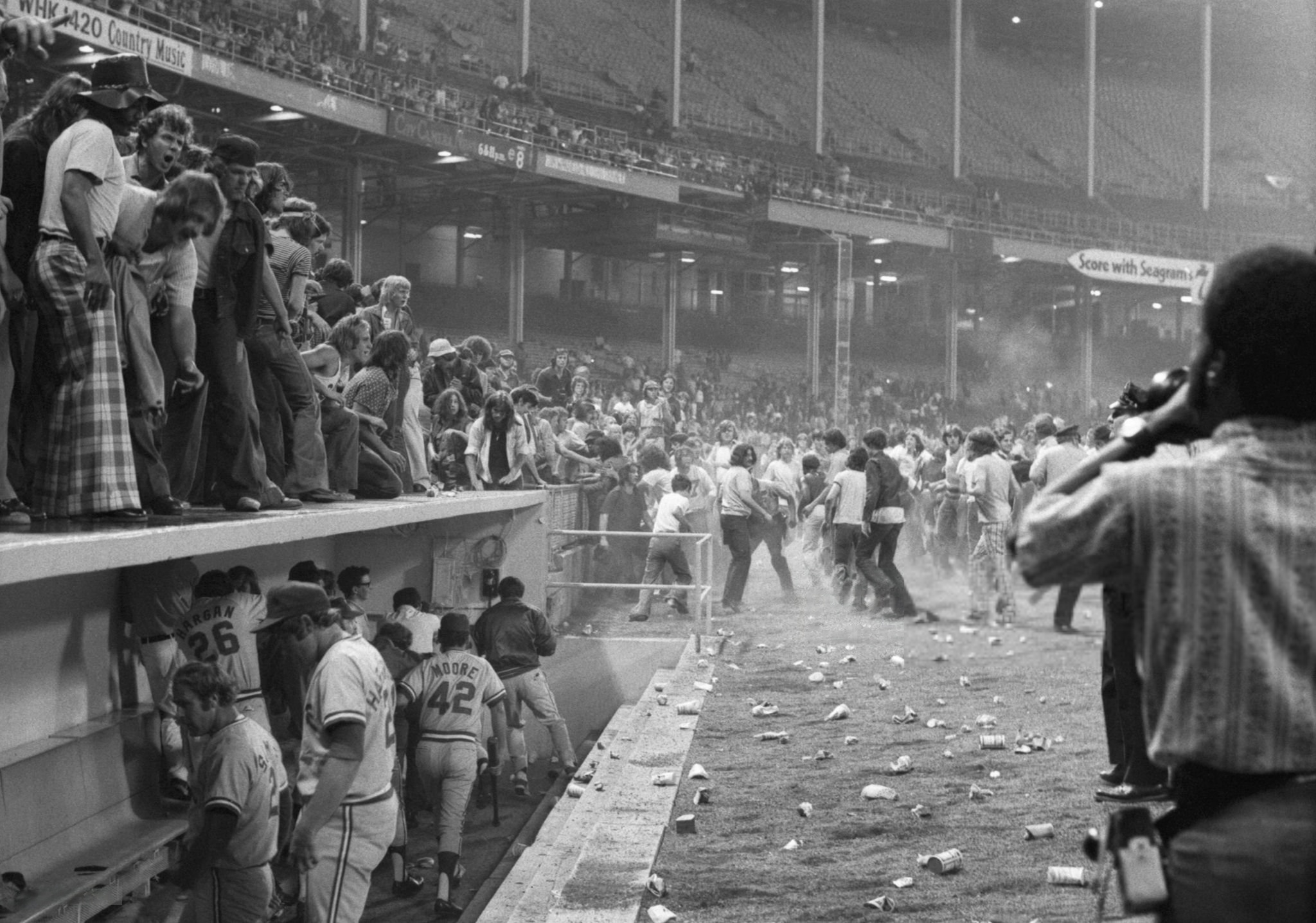
- Texas Rangers players run to the dressing room as fans invade the field
- Date: June 4, 1974
- Time: Evening
- Location: Cleveland Stadium, Cleveland, Ohio, U.S.; 41°30′21″N 81°42′00″W
- Cause: Fan animosity from previous game combined with low-point beer being sold cheaply and liberally
- Participants: Cleveland Indians and Texas Rangers baseball clubs, several thousand inebriated attendees
- Outcome: Game forfeited to Texas
- Injuries: Various players, officials, and fans (exact count unknown)
- Property damage: Damage to the field of Cleveland Stadium; bases stolen, never returned
- Suspects: 9 fans arrested
- Charges: Disorderly conduct

Ten-Cent Beer Night was an ill-fated promotion held by Major League Baseball's Cleveland Indians during a game against the Texas Rangers at Cleveland Stadium in Cleveland, Ohio, United States, on June 4, 1974. The promotion was meant to improve attendance at the game by offering cups of beer for just 10 cents each (equivalent to $0.65 in 2025), a substantial discount on the regular price of 65 cents (equivalent to $4.24 in 2025), with a limit of six beers per purchase but no limit on the number of purchases made during the game.

Six days earlier, the Indians and the Rangers had been involved in a widely publicized bench-clearing brawl; the game therefore drew a rowdy and belligerent crowd. As the game proceeded, on-field incidents and massive alcohol consumption further agitated the crowd, many of whom threw lit firecrackers, streaked across the playing field and openly smoked marijuana. Most sober fans departed early, leaving an increasingly drunk and unruly mob behind. Continued degradation of the game culminated in a riot in the ninth inning when fans rushed the field. Players were forced to protect themselves with their bats while retreating from the field. Chief umpire Nestor Chylak declared the game to be forfeited in Texas's favor due to the mob's uncontrollable behavior.

== Background ==
The Cleveland Indians organization had previously held such promotions without incident, beginning with Nickel Beer Day in 1971 (equivalent to $0.40 in 2025). However, a bench-clearing brawl during the May 29, 1974, game between the Indians and the Texas Rangers at Arlington Stadium angered many Indians fans, who then harbored a grudge against the Rangers. The trouble at Arlington Stadium had begun in the bottom of the fourth inning with a walk to the Rangers' Tom Grieve, followed by a Lenny Randle single. The next batter, Jim Fregosi, hit what should have been a double-play ball to Indians third baseman John Lowenstein; Lowenstein stepped on third base to retire Grieve and threw the ball to second base for the second out, but Randle disrupted the play with a hard slide into second baseman Jack Brohamer.

The Indians retaliated in the bottom of the eighth when pitcher Milt Wilcox threw behind Randle's legs. On the next pitch Randle laid down a drag bunt. When Wilcox fielded the ball and approached Randle to tag him out, Randle intentionally veered inside the baseline toward Wilcox and hit him with his forearm before continuing to first base. Indians first baseman John Ellis responded by intercepting and punching Randle before he reached the base, and both benches emptied for a brawl. After the brawl was broken up, as Indians players and coaches returned to the dugout, they were struck by food and beer hurled by Rangers fans; catcher Dave Duncan had to be restrained from entering the stands to fight the fans.

The game was not suspended or forfeited, no players from either team were ejected and the Rangers won, 3–0.

After the game, a Cleveland reporter asked Rangers manager Billy Martin, "Are you going to take your armor to Cleveland?" to which Martin replied, "Naw, they won't have enough fans there to worry about." During the week leading up to the teams' next meeting in Cleveland, sports radio talk show host Pete Franklin and Indians radio announcer Joe Tait made comments that fueled the fans' animosity toward the Rangers. In addition, the Cleveland Plain Dealer newspaper printed a cartoon the day of the game showing Indians mascot Chief Wahoo holding a pair of boxing gloves with the caption, "Be ready for anything."

== The game ==
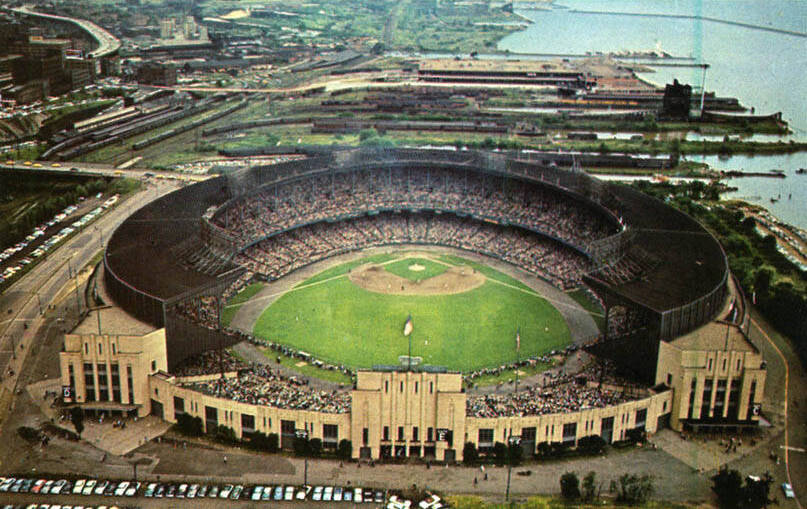
The game was played at Cleveland Stadium (pictured 1955).

=== Problems from the beginning ===
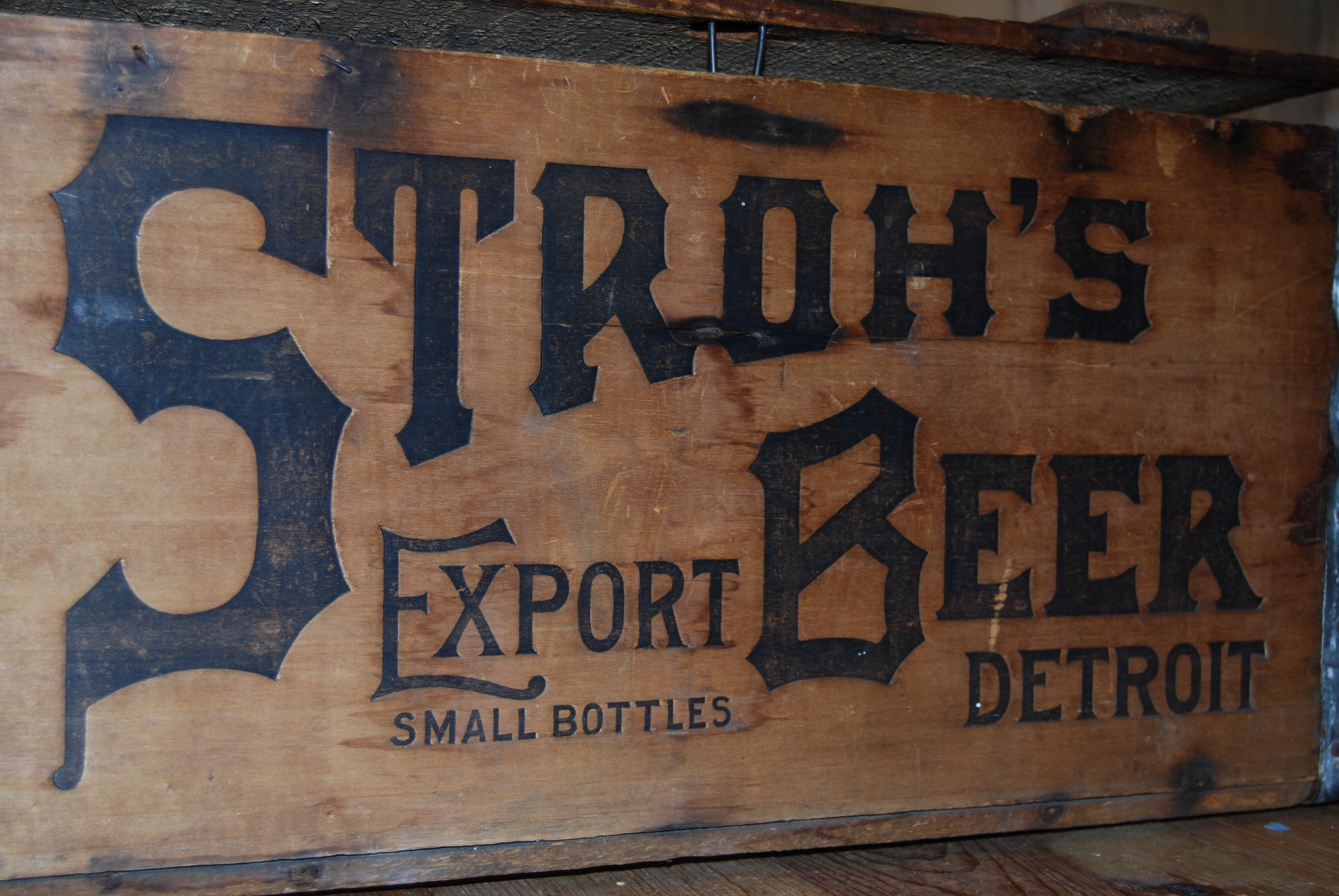
A Stroh's beer promotion was blamed for the riot

Six days after the brawl at Arlington Stadium, the Indians' Ten Cent Beer Night promotion drew 25,134 fans to Cleveland Stadium for the Tuesday night game, twice the number expected. 12-fluid-ounce (355 mL) cups of beer were offered for just 10 cents each, a substantial discount on the regular price of 65 cents, with a limit of six beers per purchase but with no limit on the number of purchases made during the game. Although the beer intended to be served at the discount price was 3.2% alcohol, regular strength (5%–6%) Stroh's beer was also served.

The Rangers quickly took a 5–1 lead. Meanwhile, throughout the game, the increasingly inebriated crowd grew more and more unruly. Early in the game, Cleveland's Leron Lee hit a line drive into the stomach of Rangers pitcher Ferguson Jenkins, after which Jenkins dropped to the ground. Fans in the upper deck of the stadium cheered, then chanted, "Hit 'em again! Hit 'em again! Harder! Harder!" A woman ran out to the Indians' on-deck circle, flashed her breasts and then tried to kiss umpire Nestor Chylak, who "was not in a kissing mood". As the Rangers' Grieve hit his second home run of the game, a naked man sprinted to second base and slid in, "probably getting dirt in places unsuitable for speculation", in the words of one sportswriter. One inning later, a father-and-son pair ran onto the outfield and mooned the fans in the bleachers.

Some fans brought firecrackers to the game, which they set off in the stands or lit and threw onto the playing field. As the game progressed, more fans ran onto the field and disrupted play. Rangers first baseman Mike Hargrove was pelted with hot dogs and spat at, and at one point was nearly struck by an empty gallon jug of Thunderbird.

The Rangers argued a call in which Lee was called safe in a close play at third base, spiking Jenkins with his cleats in the process and forcing him to leave the game. The Rangers' angry response to this play provoked an enraged outburst from Cleveland fans, who again began throwing objects onto the field. A fan also threw lighted firecrackers into the Rangers' bullpen. Clouds of firecracker and marijuana smoke further contributed to the unsettling mood.

By the seventh inning, families and those fans who remained sober had mostly left the ballpark, and the remaining crowd became increasingly intoxicated and belligerent. As sportswriter Paul Jackson described in a 2008 article on the event:

Early on, the demand for beer surpassed the Indians' capacity to ferry it to concession stands, and a luminary, perhaps the same person who suggested the promotion in the first place, decided to allow fans to line up behind the outfield fences and have their cups filled directly from Stroh's company trucks. The promotion achieved critical mass at that moment, as weaving, hooting queues of people refilled via industrial spigot.

In the bottom of the ninth, the Indians managed to rally, tying the game 5–5, and had Rusty Torres on second base representing the potential winning run. However, with a rowdy crowd that had been drinking heavily for nine innings, the situation finally boiled over.

=== The riot ===
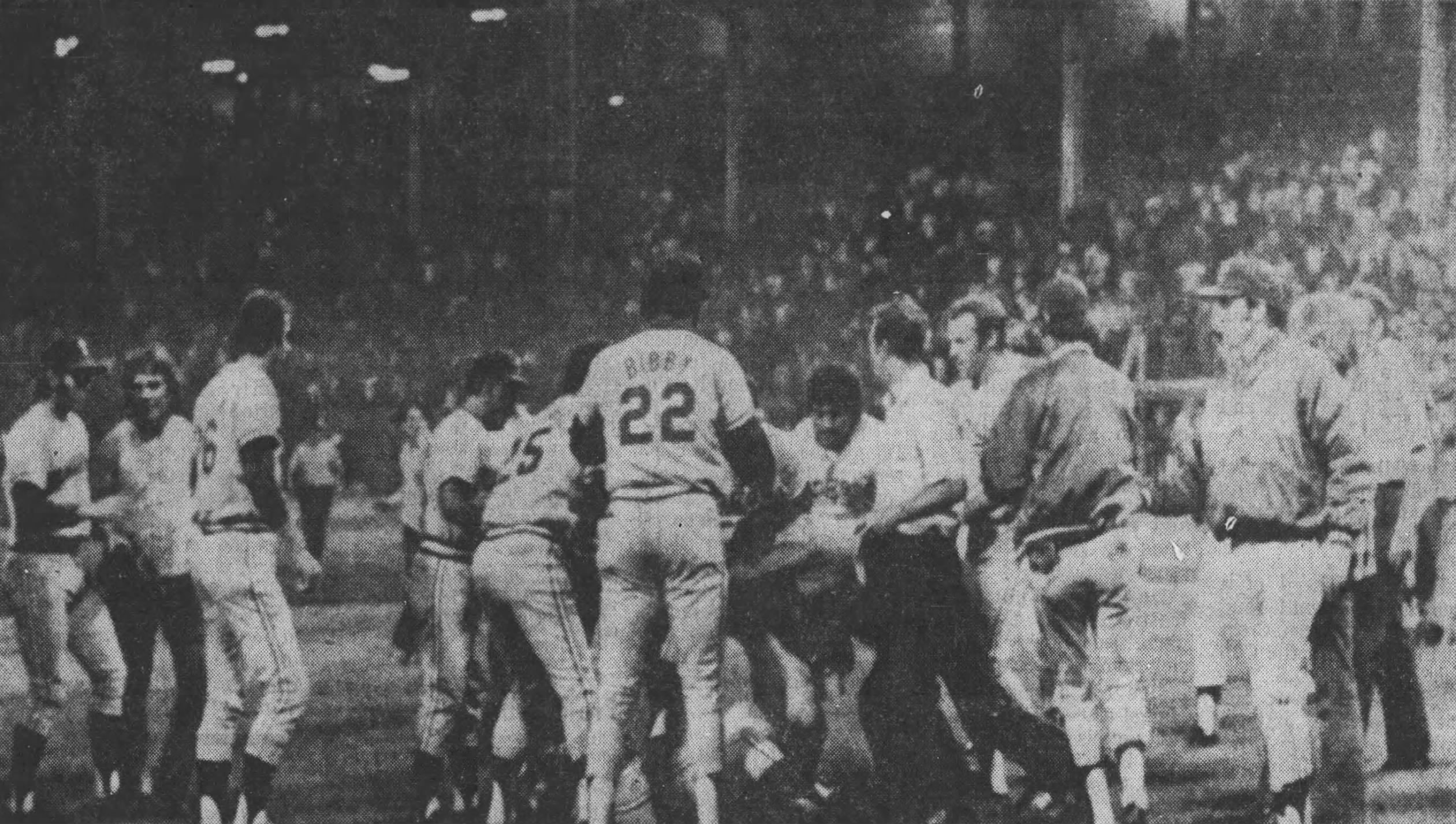
The Rangers aiding Burroughs

After the Indians had tied the game, a 19-year-old fan named Terry Yerkic ran onto the field and attempted to steal Texas outfielder Jeff Burroughs' cap. According to Yerkic, he dropped the hat, and as he picked it up, "I looked up, and saw (Burroughs) looking at me, and I said 'Oh, hell.'" Burroughs kicked Yerkic and stumbled in the process. Thinking that Burroughs had been attacked, Texas manager Billy Martin and his players ran onto the field, some armed with bats. A large number of intoxicated fans—some armed with knives, chains and clubs fashioned from portions of stadium seats they had torn apart—rushed the field, and others hurled bottles from the stands. Two hundred fans surrounded the twenty-five Rangers, with more fans coming.

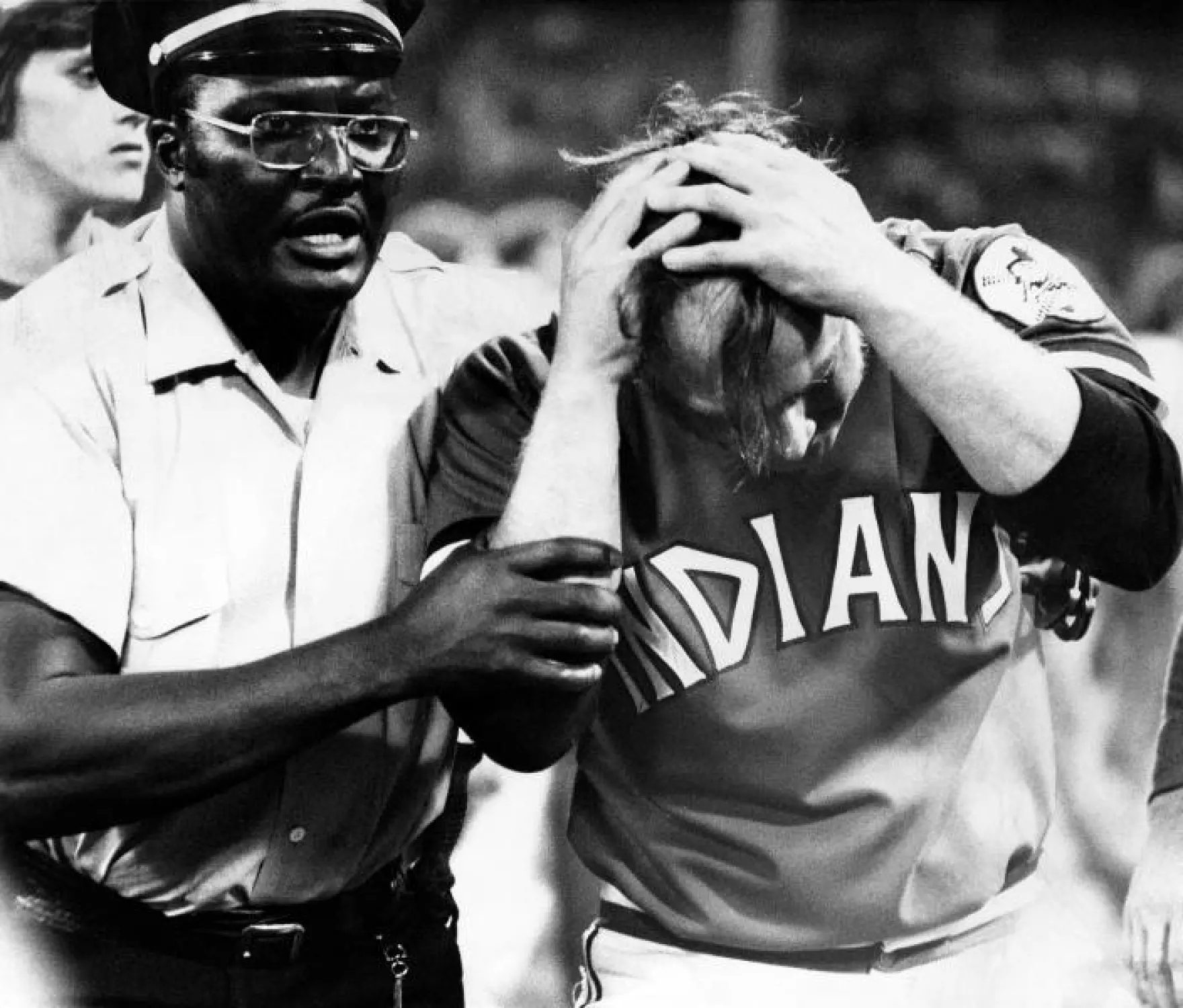
Hilgendorf (right) shields his head after being struck by a chair

Realizing that the Rangers' lives might be in danger, Cleveland manager Ken Aspromonte ordered his players to grab bats and help the Rangers, attacking the team's own fans in the process. Rioters began throwing steel folding chairs, and Cleveland relief pitcher Tom Hilgendorf was hit in the head by one of them. The Rangers' Hargrove, after subduing one rioter in a fistfight, had to fight another on his way back to the Texas dugout, while Texas catcher and former Indian Duke Sims also wound up getting into a fight with a fan. The two teams retreated off the field through the dugouts in groups, with players protecting each other.

The teams fled into their clubhouses and closed and locked the doors. The crowd pulled up and stole the bases from the infield. Rioters threw a vast array of objects, including cups, rocks, bottles, batteries from radios, hot dogs, popcorn containers and folding chairs. Umpire crew chief Chylak, realizing that order would not be restored in a timely fashion, forfeited the game to Texas. He, too, was a victim of the rioters, as one struck and cut his head with part of a stadium seat, and his hand was cut by a thrown rock. He later called the fans "uncontrollable beasts" and stated that he'd never seen anything like what had happened "except in a zoo".

The rioting continued for twenty minutes as Joe Tait and Herb Score described the events live on radio. Tait commented, "Aw, this is absolute tragedy." The Cleveland Division of Police finally arrived to restore order, arresting nine fans. Indians players escorted the Rangers to the team bus. A local sportswriter, Dan Coughlin of the Chronicle-Telegram, attempted to interview fans but was punched in the face twice, though Coughlin later recollected that the drunken punches were so weak, he was barely affected by them.

Cleveland general manager Phil Seghi blamed the umpires for losing control of the game. The Sporting News wrote that "Seghi's perspective might have been different had he been in Chylak's shoes, in the midst of knife-wielding, bottle-throwing, chair-tossing, fist-swinging drunks". American League president Lee MacPhail commented, "There was no question that beer played a part in the riot."

=== Box score ===
June 4, 1974; 8:05 pm EDT	Texas Rangers	5–5	Cleveland Indians	Cleveland Stadium; Attendance: 25,134; Umpires: HP: Larry McCoy; 1B: Joe Brinkman; 2B: Nick Bremigan; 3B: Nestor Chylak (cc)
June 4, 1974; 8:05 pm EDT		Boxscore		Cleveland Stadium; Attendance: 25,134; Umpires: HP: Larry McCoy; 1B: Joe Brinkman; 2B: Nick Bremigan; 3B: Nestor Chylak (cc)

== Notable attendees ==
Among the Indians players fleeing was outfielder Rusty Torres, who experienced three major-league baseball riots. In addition to this game, he had been with the New York Yankees at the Senators' final game in Washington in 1971, and he was later with the Chicago White Sox during the infamous Disco Demolition Night in 1979.

NBC newscaster Tim Russert, then a student at the Cleveland–Marshall College of Law, attended the game and later commented, "I went with $2 in my pocket. You do the math."

== Beer Night II ==
Cleveland held a second Beer Night promotion only 14 days later, on June 18, which was completed without incident, attracting 41,848 fans with beer again selling for 10 cents per cup. This second promotion had a limit of two cups per person at the reduced price, with 200 police officers at the ballpark.

== See also ==
- Violence in sports
  - Sports riot
    - List of violent incidents between sports participants and spectators
- Hooliganism
- List of nicknamed Major League Baseball games and plays
