= Yount Monument =

Artwork by Brian Maughan

- Artist: Brian Maughan
- Year: 2001
- Type: bronze
- Dimensions: 210 cm (84 in)
- Location: Miller Park; Milwaukee, Wisconsin; 43.028997°N 87.972602°W

The Yount Monument is a public art work by artist Brian Maughan. It is located in front of American Family Field west of downtown Milwaukee, Wisconsin. The sculpture depicts Robin Yount, a member of the Milwaukee Brewers baseball team, following through after taking a swing at a pitch. The figure wears a 1980s-style uniform with close-fitting calf-length pants, a button-front short-sleeved jersey and a batting helmet. The sculpture was dedicated on April 5, 2001.
