= Nestor Chylak =

American baseball umpire (1922–1982)

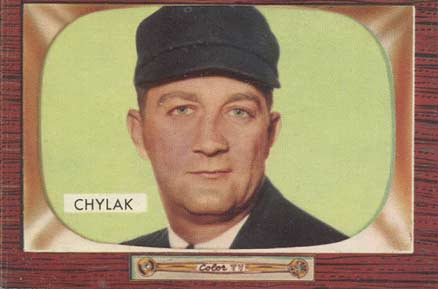
- Born: May 11, 1922; Olyphant, Pennsylvania, U.S.
- Died: February 17, 1982 (aged 59); Dunmore, Pennsylvania, U.S.
- Resting place: SS. Cyril and Methodius Catholic Cemetery, Peckville, Pennsylvania
- Occupation: American League Umpire
- Years active: 1954–1978
- Military career
- Branch: United States Army
- Service years: 1942–1945
- Conflicts: World War II; Battle of the Bulge
- Awards: Silver Star (1); Purple Heart (1)
- Baseball career

Career highlights and awards
- Special Assignments: All-Star Game (1957, 1960, 1960², 1964, 1973 and 1978); ALCS (1969, 1972, 1973); World Series (1957, 1960, 1966, 1971, 1977)

Member of the National

Baseball Hall of Fame
- Induction: 1999
- Election method: Veterans Committee

Nestor George Chylak Jr. (/ˈtʃaɪlæk/; May 11, 1922 – February 17, 1982) was an American umpire in Major League Baseball who worked in the American League from 1954 to 1978. He umpired in three ALCS (1969, 1972, 1973), serving as crew chief in 1969 and 1973. He also called five World Series (1957, 1960, 1966, 1971, 1977), serving as the crew chief in 1971 (in which he worked home plate in the decisive Game 7) and 1977. He also worked in six All-Star Games: 1957, 1960 (both games), 1964, 1973 and 1978, working home plate in the second 1960 game and in 1973.

== Early life ==
Chylak was born in Olyphant, Pennsylvania. His parents, Nestor Sr. and Nellie, were of Ukrainian descent; Chylak was the first of their five children. He attended the University of Scranton, where he studied engineering.

During World War II, he served in the U.S. Army in Europe. He suffered shrapnel injuries in Battle of the Bulge, which blinded him for several days and hospitalized him for eight weeks. He earned both the Silver Star and Purple Heart during his service. After the war, he began umpiring amateur baseball in 1946, and returned briefly to college.

== Career ==
After a year in amateur baseball, Chylak moved into the minor leagues as a Pennsylvania-Ontario-New York League umpire. He spent several more minor league seasons in the Canadian–American League, the New England League, and the Eastern League. He debuted in the major leagues in 1954.

Chylak said that two of his greatest thrills occurred in the early to mid-1960s. The first occurred in the 1960 World Series: he was umpiring at first base when Bill Mazeroski of the Pittsburgh Pirates hit the home run that allowed the Pirates to defeat the New York Yankees. His second was during the 1966 World Series; he was the home plate umpire during what turned out to be Sandy Koufax's final game, before his retirement a few weeks later.

Chylak worked the first American League Championship Series in 1969. On June 4, 1974, he was umpiring at third base in Cleveland for "Ten Cent Beer Night". The Cleveland Indians had been struggling with low attendance figures, resulting in this promotion that attracted more than 25,000 fans to the game. Fans became unruly and incited fights with the players, sometimes pouring beer on them. Chylak, exercising his authority as crew chief, declared the game a forfeit after he sustained a facial wound from being hit with a chair.

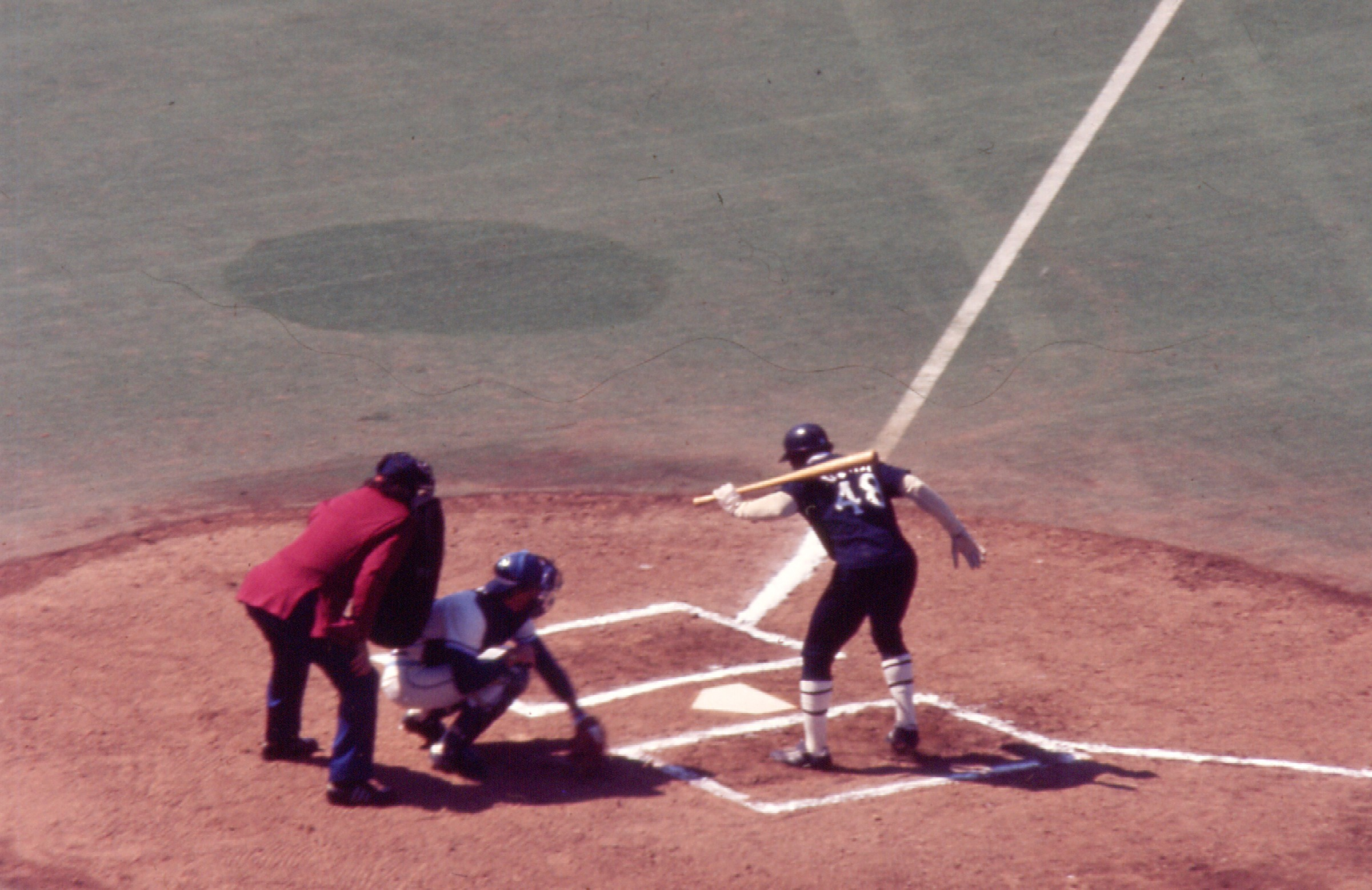
Chylak at home plate during the inaugural game of the Toronto Blue Jays franchise.

He was the home plate umpire for the first major league game played by the Toronto Blue Jays in 1977 during a snowstorm at Exhibition Stadium against the Chicago White Sox.

After retiring from the field in 1978, he became an assistant league supervisor of umpires. Chylak was in the umpire's dressing room at Comiskey Park on Disco Demolition Night, a July 12, 1979, doubleheader between the Detroit Tigers and Chicago White Sox. Between the games of the doubleheader, unruly fans rioted. Because of damage to the field, the umpires, led by crew chief Dave Phillips, refused to allow the second game to be played. When American League president Lee MacPhail decided the White Sox must forfeit the second game, Chylak was the one who informed White Sox owner Bill Veeck.

According to family, his most memorable game was umpiring the 1960 World Series when, on October 13, Bill Mazeroski hit a home run off reliever Ralph Terry at Forbes Field in Pittsburgh. This was the only homer to end a World Series game 7 in major league history.

With a total of 31 career ejections, he was also credited with never throwing Baltimore manager Earl Weaver out of a game.

== Retirement and death ==
Following his retirement, he became a member of the Sports Illustrated Speakers' Bureau and addressed a wide variety of groups, "talking about the intangible lessons he learned during his years in baseball". Chylak died in his sleep on February 17, 1982, at age 59 in Dunmore, Pennsylvania, and was survived by his wife Sue, his sons Robert and William, and three siblings.

== Legacy ==
Upon his death, Bowie Kuhn said that "few have ever been more respected in his field than Mr. Chylak." AL president Lee MacPhail said, "He was considered an outstanding teacher and certainly one of the finest umpires in major league baseball in modern times. We are sure he will be a candidate for eventual Hall of Fame recognition... Baseball has lost a wonderful friend and a great umpire." He was elected to the Baseball Hall of Fame by the Veterans Committee in 1999.

In 2013, the Bob Feller Act of Valor Award honored Chylak as one of 37 Baseball Hall of Fame members for his service in the United States Army during World War II.

== See also ==
- List of Major League Baseball umpires (disambiguation)
