= Orlando Cepeda =

Puerto Rican baseball player (1937–2024)

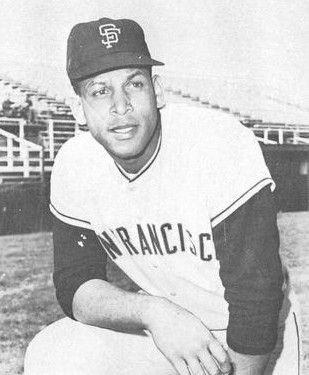
- Cepeda with the San Francisco Giants in 1965
- First baseman
- Born: September 17, 1937; Ponce, Puerto Rico
- Died: June 28, 2024 (aged 86); Concord, California, U.S.
- Batted: Right Threw: Right

MLB debut
- April 15, 1958, for the San Francisco Giants

Last MLB appearance
- September 19, 1974, for the Kansas City Royals

MLB statistics
- Batting average: .297
- Hits: 2,351
- Home runs: 379
- Runs batted in: 1,365
- Stats at Baseball Reference

Teams
- San Francisco Giants (1958–1966); St. Louis Cardinals (1966–1968); Atlanta Braves (1969–1972); Oakland Athletics (1972); Boston Red Sox (1973); Kansas City Royals (1974)

Career highlights and awards
- 11× All-Star (1959–1964, 1967); World Series champion (1967); NL MVP (1967); NL Rookie of the Year (1958); NL home run leader (1961); 2× NL RBI leader (1961, 1967); San Francisco Giants No. 30 retired; San Francisco Giants Wall of Fame

Member of the National

Baseball Hall of Fame
- Induction: 1999
- Election method: Veterans Committee

Orlando Manuel Cepeda Pennes (Spanish pronunciation: [oɾˈlando seˈpeða]; September 17, 1937 – June 28, 2024), nicknamed "the Baby Bull" and "Peruchin", was a Puerto Rican professional baseball player, coach and scout. He played in Major League Baseball (MLB) as a first baseman from 1958 to 1974, most prominently as a member of the San Francisco Giants where he established himself as one of the most consistent power hitters in the National League (NL) during the 1960s. An 11-time All-Star player, Cepeda was inducted into the Baseball Hall of Fame in 1999.

Breaking in with the Giants in their first season after relocating to San Francisco, he was named the NL Rookie of the Year by unanimous vote in 1958. Every year from 1958 through 1963, he was among the league leaders in batting, home runs, RBIs, slugging percentage, and total bases. In 1959, he became the first Puerto Rican player to start an All-Star Game, and in 1961 he was runner-up in voting for the NL Most Valuable Player (MVP) after leading the league with 46 home runs and 142 RBIs, which remains the club record for right-handed hitters. In the ensuing years, the Giants struggled to fit both Cepeda and teammate Willie McCovey, also a first basemen, into their lineup, unsuccessfully trying to shift each of them to left field at different points.

After longstanding knee injuries forced Cepeda to miss most of the 1965 season, limiting him to pinch hitting duties, he was traded in May 1966 to the St. Louis Cardinals, coming back to finish the year with a .301 average. In 1967, Cepeda in helping the team to the NL pennant, won the MVP Award by unanimous vote. Another trade brought him to the Atlanta Braves, and he helped that team win the inaugural NL West division title in 1969. With his play increasingly limited by knee problems, he was traded to the American League shortly before its adoption of the designated hitter, and won the first Outstanding Designated Hitter Award with the Boston Red Sox in 1973 before his career came to an end the following year.

Cepeda struggled in his personal life after the end of his career. After a 1975 arrest for transporting marijuana from Colombia to Puerto Rico, he served ten months in prison and saw his reputation ruined on his home island. Following changes in his personal life, however, he repaired his image after being contracted by the Giants in 1987 to work as a scout and goodwill ambassador, beginning decades of humanitarian work.

== Early life ==
Cepeda was born in Ponce, Puerto Rico, to Pedro Aníbal Cepeda (1905/6–1955) and Carmen Pennes. The family was poor, and lived in wood houses without a telephone or refrigerator. His father was a professional baseball player in Puerto Rico, where he was known as "Perucho" and "the Bull", and was widely considered one of the best players of his generation. Orlando was thus known as "the Baby Bull". Cepeda saw his father play baseball for the first time in 1946, and was instantly interested in the game.

Because he was black and the bulk of his career was played before Jackie Robinson broke baseball's color line in 1947, Perucho Cepeda could not play in the major leagues. Several players from the Negro leagues visited their house, which influenced Orlando's view of the sport. He became a fan of Minnie Miñoso.

When he was 10 years old, Cepeda began to sell newspapers in order to participate in a baseball tournament organized for the paper boys. His first tryout came three years later. He practiced with the team for three months but did not make the roster. Cepeda then began playing basketball, but he tore cartilage in his knee and underwent surgery. The injury kept him inactive for nearly a year, and the doctor recommended that he avoid practicing basketball. He began practicing baseball again, noticing that his physical strength had significantly improved in two years.

One day, an amateur baseball player saw him play and recruited him to play with his team. The organization won Puerto Rico's amateur championship and went on to play against an All-Star team from the Dominican Republic. Pedro Zorilla, then owner of the Santurce Crabbers, attended the game to scout another player, but after seeing Cepeda play, he became interested in him. In 1953, Zorilla brought him onto the team to work as a batboy. After retiring, Pedro Cepeda worked for the government, checking the water of rivers in the municipality. He contracted malaria, which eventually precipitated his death at age 49. This illness worsened the family's living conditions. They moved from Guayama to Juncos, where their financial condition deteriorated. They moved again, this time to San Juan, where his mother worked odd jobs to support the family. After her father's death, there was not sufficient income in the household to pay for Orlando to attend college.

== Professional career ==
=== Minor leagues ===
In 1955, Zorilla persuaded Cepeda's family to purchase an airplane ticket so that he could participate in a New York Giants tryout. After passing the tryout, he was assigned by the Giants to Sandersville, a Class D team. Cepeda was subsequently transferred to the Salem Rebels, but he had trouble adapting because he did not speak English. He also encountered discrimination due to racial segregation under the Jim Crow laws. Shortly after this move, Zorilla called to inform him that his father was in critical condition. Pedro Cepeda died a few days later; Orlando paid the burial expenses and returned to Salem. He was depressed, which affected his performance. He wanted to quit and return to Puerto Rico, but Zorilla convinced him to play for the Kokomo Giants, a team in the Mississippi–Ohio Valley League. Walt Dixon, the team's manager, assigned him to play third base. Cepeda batted in the cleanup spot, finishing with a .393 average, hitting 21 home runs with 91 RBIs.

Jim Tobin, who owned his contract, noticed his potential and sold his player's rights back to the Giants. After a visit to Puerto Rico, Cepeda returned to New York before being sent to play with the St. Cloud Rox in Class C. The team reassigned him to play first base. Cepeda adapted to the change quickly. That year, he won the Northern League Triple Crown, finishing with an average of .355 with 112 RBIs and 26 home runs. Jack Schwarz promoted him to Class B, a decision that he protested, noting that players with worse performance were being sent to Double A. Following a solid season in Class B, Cepeda played for the Crabbers in the Puerto Rican Professional Baseball League (LBPPR) during the winter, concluding with a batting average of .310, 11 home runs, and 40 RBIs. He then signed a Class A contract with the Springfield Giants, accepting it on condition that he be allowed to play with the Minneapolis Millers in spring training. Cepeda had a slow start, but his performance improved as the season advanced, and the team retained him on their roster. After completing the 1957 season with the Millers, he returned to Puerto Rico and played in the LBPPR. While he was playing with Santurce, manager Bill Rigney, team owner Horace Stoneham and Tom Sheehan scouted him on behalf of the Giants, who had just moved from New York to San Francisco. He was invited to the team's spring training along with other prospects, including Felipe Alou and Willie Kirkland.

=== San Francisco Giants (1958–1966) ===
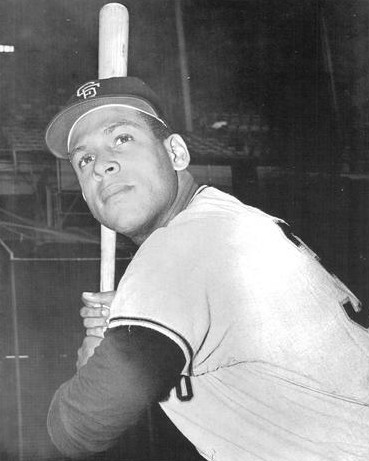
Cepeda in 1961

Cepeda was called up by the San Francisco Giants in 1958. His 13 home runs through May 31 that year place him in a tie with Joc Pederson (2015) for the second-most by a National League rookie through the end of May in baseball history, surpassed only by Albert Pujols (16, in 2001).

He signed his first major league contract ten minutes before debuting in the league, earning $7,000 for the season. In San Francisco, the team received significant media attention. Due to his performance, the team raised his salary to $9,500 in June. During the season, Cepeda lived with Rubén Gómez, but stopped doing so after some tension developed between them.

His average remained steady throughout the season, never falling below .305, which was his average in September. The Giants led the pennant race for a month, but their record in August and September was below .500, and they finished in third place with a record of 80–74, four games behind the Pittsburgh Pirates and twelve behind the Milwaukee Braves, who won their second consecutive pennant.

In his first season, Cepeda batted .312 with 25 home runs, 96 RBIs, and a league-leading 38 doubles. Cepeda and teammate Willie Mays were the only NL players to finish the season ranked among the leaders in hits, home runs, RBIs, batting average, runs scored, and stolen bases. He was unanimously selected the NL Rookie of the Year, becoming the second player, after Frank Robinson in 1956, to receive a unanimous vote. He was also selected the Most Valuable Giant in a poll conducted by the San Francisco Examiner. On September 28, 1958, the publication presented him a plaque in recognition of the selection.

After the season concluded, Cepeda used his salary to buy a new house for his mother. That year he won the LBPPR batting title with an average of .362, while Santurce won the league's championship. The Giants offered him a $12,000 contract, which he refused, asking for $20,000. After negotiations, the parties settled on $17,000.

In 1959, Cepeda reported to spring training with more confidence than the year before. He opened the season hitting in nine straight games, with 15 hits in his first 35 at bats. After experiencing a brief slump during the latter half of May, Cepeda recovered, hitting 12 home runs by June 4; that day he had four hits including a pair of home runs and a double, driving in seven runs in an 11–5 road win over the Braves. He was selected as a starter in both All-Star games during the season. Cepeda was briefly moved to third base to open a spot for Willie McCovey in the starting lineup, but was moved to the outfield after committing errors in the position. He hit six home runs between August and September. The Giants remained in the race for the pennant during the latter part of the season, but were eliminated from competition after losing a series against the Los Angeles Dodgers, eventually finishing third. Cepeda led the team in batting average (.317) and RBIs (105).

Cepeda subsequently moved from Daly City to the Sunset District, seeking a house within the city. In 1960, the Giants moved him back to first base after McCovey was sent to the minor leagues. Cepeda finished with an average of .297, with 24 home runs and 96 RBIs. He moved twice this year, first to 19th and Pacheco and then to 48th and Pacheco, where he and McCovey bought a building next to the ocean.

In 1961, Cepeda had what he considered to be the best statistics of his career. He led the league in RBIs (142), home runs (46), and at bats per home run (7.9). On July 4, in the first game of a road doubleheader against the Chicago Cubs, Cepeda had a spectacular game, going 5-for-5 with two doubles and a three-run home run that traveled over 500 feet to deep center field, driving in a career-high eight runs in a 19–3 blowout. He was once again selected to play in the All-Star Game starting lineup. The Giants led the league in runs scored, while the pitching staff had a collective earned run average (ERA) of 3.77. The team finished in third place. Cepeda finished second in the Most Valuable Player voting, after Frank Robinson. After the season, Cepeda – who at the time was earning $30,000 – asked for a $20,000 raise based on his performance. The general manager believed that he was making too much money for a fourth-year player, and the negotiations continued until a final salary of $46,000 was settled on. The 1962 Giants were an improved team, constantly rivaling the Dodgers for the league lead. Several players from the team, including Cepeda, participated in the All-Star Games. Finishing tied with the Dodgers, the Giants played against them in a playoff series to determine the National League champion. They won the best of three series 2–1. Cepeda batted .306 for the year, with 35 home runs and 114 RBIs. The team thus advanced to the World Series to face the New York Yankees; New York won in seven games. In 1961 and 1962, Cepeda had strong years; however, he had serious problems with manager Alvin Dark, to the point of almost skipping some games. Among the things that Dark did after being named manager was to order the Latin American players to stop speaking Spanish in the clubhouse. Cepeda immediately confronted him; after this, Dark avoided summoning the Hispanic players to any team meeting.

During the winter, Cepeda returned to the LBPPR, where he suffered a knee injury while training. In 1963, he played the entire season with the injury, not informing the Giants out of concern for his spot in the roster. He was in constant pain, but was in the race for a batting title along with Roberto Clemente, Dick Groat, and Tommy Davis, eventually finishing fifth. His batting average was .316, with 34 home runs and 97 RBIs. Before his 26th birthday, Cepeda had accumulated 1,105 hits, the 11th highest total for a 25-year-old player in MLB history.

In 1964, San Francisco remained in the pennant race until the last week, when the St. Louis Cardinals defeated the New York Mets to secure the flag. Cepeda led the team in batting average with .304 and a slugging percentage of .539. Cepeda attended 1965 spring training, having limited participation. One of his friends, who was from Mexico, brought in a jar with alcohol and cannabis to reduce the pain, noting that it was an "old Mexican remedy". Noticing this, a clubhouse employee offered to bring him a cannabis "joint", which he accepted. After this event, he consumed the drug regularly in order to "relax". After experiencing swelling in the knee during the first games of the season, a group of doctors recommended that he stop playing, however, Cepeda refused to do so since baseball was his main source of income. He received treatment from Gene Sollovief, a Russian doctor who implemented a weight and exercise regime. He returned to action, but only had 34 at bats with an average of .176 and only one home run. He returned to Puerto Rico, undergoing further physical therapy. In the off-season, Cepeda also bought a house in Diamond Heights while his wife was pregnant with their son, Orlando Jr. After recovering from the injury, he attended 1966 spring training; however, he was not placed in the team's starting lineup.

=== St. Louis Cardinals (1966–1968) ===
In May 1966, the Giants traded Cepeda to the St. Louis Cardinals for pitcher Ray Sadecki. The Giants were playing a series against the Cardinals in St. Louis at the time of the trade, so Cepeda joined the team there. Bob Howsam, the Cardinals general manager, was interested in him because the team had problems on offense. After the trade, the team granted him a new contract for $53,000. With the help of Harry Caray, the Cardinals' announcer, Cepeda moved to a house in Olivette, Missouri. The team finished in sixth place, with a record of 83–79. He finished his first season with the Cardinals playing 123 games with an average of .303, and was named the NL Comeback Player of the Year.

In 1967, the Cardinals entered the season with analysts giving them odds of 12–1 of winning the pennant. Cepeda began the season strongly, driving in seven runs in the first four games. The team promoted offensive performance by fining any player who left teammates on base a dollar; the money was used to pay for the postseason party. The Cardinals contended in the early league standings with the Chicago Cubs, but the team took control of the pennant race as the season progressed. Cepeda's offense remained stable, finishing June as the league's leader in doubles. He played in his seventh All-Star Game, which the National League won 2–1. Cepeda was named NL Player of the Month for the only time in his career in August, when he batted .352 with 5 home runs and 25 RBIs. The Cardinals won the pennant by 10 1/2 games (101–60), and defeated the Boston Red Sox in seven games to win the World Series. Cepeda concluded the season hitting .325, with 21 game-winning hits and a league-leading 111 RBIs. He was named the National League Most Valuable Player. Cepeda was the second NL player, after Carl Hubbell, to win the award unanimously. He, Albert Pujols, Frank Robinson, and Mike Trout are also the only players in major league history to win both the Rookie of the Year and MVP awards unanimously. Cepeda was the first Latin player to win the home run and RBI titles.

In 1968, the Cardinals were considered the strongest team in the majors. They won the pennant for a second straight year, this time by a nine-game margin. The Detroit Tigers won the American League pennant by twelve games. Cepeda, who had a low average in the 1967 World Series, hit a home run that gave the Cardinals a two games to one lead. The Tigers, however, won three of the next four games to win their first World Series since 1945. This season was called the "Year of the Pitcher", because of the overwhelming dominance pitching had over offense. Cepeda had the worst statistical year of his career as a regular player, finishing with an average of .248 with 16 home runs and 73 RBIs, scoring career lows in all three statistics. He reported late to spring training in 1969, not showing up until one day before the Cardinals' first exhibition game.

=== Atlanta Braves (1969–1972) ===
Just before the season started, the Cardinals traded Cepeda to the Atlanta Braves in exchange for Joe Torre. The trade took him by surprise. After learning that his new team was the Braves, he considered retirement, but decided against it after discussing it with his wife.

Cepeda moved to Atlanta with uncertainty, wondering if the effect of the Jim Crow laws was still present, but his concerns disappeared once they settled. Cepeda attended 1969 spring training in West Palm Beach, being welcomed to the team by Hank Aaron. On August 4, Cepeda hit his 300th home run in a 7–1 road loss to the Montreal Expos. For the first time, baseball's postseason had best-of-five playoffs, and the Braves won the National League West with a record of 93–69, before losing to the Mets in the NL Championship Series. Cepeda compiled a season average of .257, with 22 home runs and 88 RBIs.

In 1970, Rico Carty of the Braves led the league in batting average, while Cepeda and Aaron each drove in more than one hundred runs. On July 11, Cepeda reached the 2,000-hit mark with three hits including a home run in a 7–6 loss to the Reds. On July 26, in the first game of a doubleheader in Chicago, he had the only three-home run game of his career, driving in seven runs in an 8–3 win; all three home runs were hit off Bill Hands, the last of them a grand slam. However, the Braves pitching staff was ineffective, and the team finished in fourth place in the division. Cepeda finished with an average of .305, 34 home runs and 111 RBIs. In 1971, Cepeda began the season with solid offense, hitting 10 home runs before May was over. However, he re-injured one of his knees in his house. The Braves' physician administered a shot, but that proved ineffective. Cepeda was attended to by Dr. Funk, the Atlanta Falcons' orthopedist. After running tests and examining X-rays, he determined that the injury was serious. Because of this, Cepeda began playing part-time. His batting average declined, and he hit only five more home runs that season. In September, Cepeda traveled to New York where he underwent surgery, returning to Puerto Rico to recover during the winter. In 1972, he began playing while still feeling pain. On May 16, Cepeda hit two home runs against the Houston Astros. During this time, Paul Richards had been replaced by Eddie Robinson as the team general manager. Robinson did not assign treatment for Cepeda's leg, eventually deciding to trade him.

=== Oakland Athletics (1972) ===
In July, Cepeda was traded to the Oakland Athletics for Denny McLain. After playing for a week, strictly as a pinch hitter, he was hospitalized and underwent a second surgery on his injured knee. Cepeda remained in Oakland three months before returning to Puerto Rico. Upon arriving, he received a telegram from Charlie Finley, the Athletics' owner, telling him that if he did not respond within three days he would be released from his contract. Cepeda decided not to call, intending to retire from baseball.

=== Boston Red Sox (1973) ===
In 1973, the American League established the designated hitter rule, hoping to improve attendance. The Red Sox contacted him, telling him that his role with the team only required batting. Cepeda became the first player to sign a contract to exclusively play as a designated hitter. His first hit with the team was a walk-off home run on April 8 to beat the Yankees 4–3, and on August 8 he had a career-high four doubles and six RBIs in a 9–4 road win against the Kansas City Royals. Cepeda finished the year with an average of .289 with 20 home runs and 86 RBIs in 550 at bats. He was awarded the Outstanding Designated Hitter Award. Cepeda's 20th home run established a major league record, making him the first player to hit 20 or more home runs with four different teams.

=== Kansas City Royals (1974) ===
After briefly playing in Mexico, he was offered a contract by the Royals. In his last season, Cepeda batted .215 with one home run and 18 RBIs. The following year, Cepeda abandoned a comeback in the Puerto Rican Baseball League, upon realizing that he could not perform as before, and retired.

== Career statistics and achievements ==
MLB Statistics
G	AB	R	H	2B	3B	HR	RBI	SB	BB	AVG	OBP	SLG	FLD%
2124	7927	1131	2351	417	27	379	1365	142	588	.297	.350	.499	.989

Cepeda was the second player from Puerto Rico to win a triple crown in Minor League Baseball, doing so in 1956 with a batting average of .355, 26 home runs, and 112 RBIs. He was selected as an All-Star seven times, appearing in 11 games (1959–64, 1967). He was the first Puerto Rican to start in an All-Star Game and to be selected in two positions, serving as a first baseman and left fielder. His lifetime numbers in the Puerto Rican Professional Baseball League are a .325 batting average (fifth place), 89 home runs, 340 runs batted in and a .544 slugging percentage (second place, and only Puerto Rican with .500+). He batted over .300 nine times.

== Post-retirement life ==
=== Legal issues ===
After retiring, that same year, Cepeda traveled to Colombia to direct a baseball clinic; once there, he met a group of drug dealers who convinced him to put bags containing five pounds of cannabis in two boxes containing hand-made clothing. Cepeda had used cannabis since 1965. He returned to Puerto Rico, waiting ten days before contacting the airport to see if the boxes had arrived. When Cepeda arrived to collect his cargo, he was told that they could not be released, since the shipping cost had not been covered; the shipment actually weighed 170 pounds (77 kg), far more than he had been expecting. At that point, two police officers (who were aware of the packages' contents) instructed one of the air freight employees to give Cepeda the boxes with or without payment. An airport employee delivered the boxes to Cepeda's car, and once Cepeda returned to his vehicle, he was arrested and charged with drug possession.

While on trial for that charge, Cepeda was arrested a second time, after a man alleged that Cepeda had pointed a gun at him. A third case was brought by Pino, seeking an increase in alimony and child support payments. In 1978, after three days at trial, Cepeda was declared guilty of the drug possession charges and sentenced to five years of imprisonment. Cepeda served ten months in jail time and the balance of his sentence on probation. Following his release, a district attorney in Puerto Rico told the prison's warden that if Cepeda returned, the mafia would likely attempt to kill him, leading to Cepeda's assignment to a halfway house in Philadelphia, Pennsylvania.

After completing that program, Cepeda coached a LBPPR team in Bayamón, Puerto Rico and was later hired as a scout by the Chicago White Sox. In 1981, the team assigned him to work as a roving instructor with one of their minor league clubs in Lynn, Massachusetts. General manager Roland Hemond released him later that year, and he briefly worked as the Crabbers' coach.

=== Return to the Giants and community work ===
In 1987, Max Shapiro asked him to substitute for McCovey in a "fantasy baseball camp" in San Francisco, and although reluctant at first, he accepted. There he met and befriended publisher Laurence Hyman, who introduced Cepeda to Giants staff members and encouraged him to write to general manager Al Rosen. After initially receiving no response, eventually Patrick J. Gallagher called to tell Cepeda that Rosen wanted to hire him as a scout. Cepeda worked in the Dominican Republic, Mexico, and other Latin American countries during his first year, after which the Giants placed him on full-time payroll. Cepeda later worked as a goodwill ambassador for the Giants, attending activities in schools, hospitals, and community centers, and he represented the Giants in programs aimed at Latin American communities. Having joined the Sōka Gakkai International, he also participated in activities for Puerto Rican communities in New York.

Cepeda threw the honorary first pitch for the third game of the 1989 National League Championship Series, and also for a regular-season game between the Giants and Dodgers on September 17, 1997, his 60th birthday. Cepeda had his own concession stand at the new Giants stadium which opened in 2000, now called Oracle Park. Among the offerings at Orlando's Caribbean BBQ is the "Caribbean Cha Cha Bowl" in reference to his nickname for his taste for jazz and Latin music. In 2006, the Society for American Baseball Research (SABR) approved a chapter for Puerto Rico, the first in Latin America, and named the chapter in honor of Cepeda. In 2008 a 9-foot bronze sculpture of Cepeda in a Giants uniform of the early 1960s was unveiled at the new ballpark. Cepeda was only the fifth Giant to be honored with such a statue, following Willie Mays, Willie McCovey, Gaylord Perry, and Juan Marichal. On September 16, 2017, the day before his 80th birthday, he attended a birthday celebration at Oracle Park where the Giants honored him, including distributing statuettes of him to the first 20,000 fans at the game.

== Legacy ==
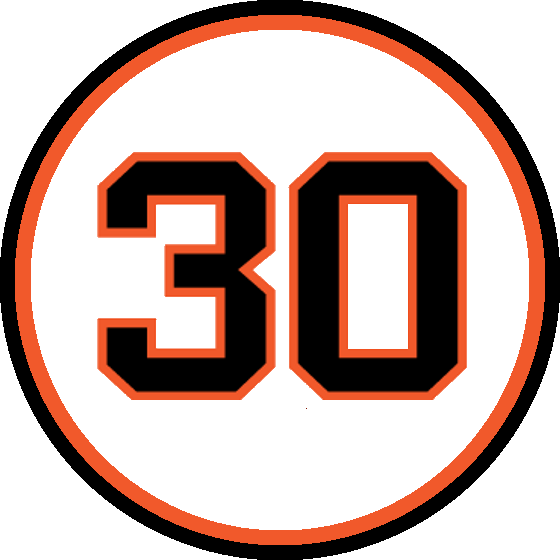
Orlando Cepeda's number 30 was retired by the San Francisco Giants in 1999.

By the early 1990s, when his time of initial eligibility for the Baseball Hall of Fame was beginning to run out, many Puerto Ricans, celebrities, and ordinary citizens alike began to campaign for his induction. Some international celebrities and former teammates also joined in the campaign. In 1994, his last year of eligibility in voting by the Baseball Writers' Association of America, he came within nine votes of being elected. In 1999, he was elected by the Hall's Veterans Committee, joining Roberto Clemente as the only other Puerto Rican in Cooperstown. They have since been joined by Roberto Alomar, Iván Rodríguez, and Edgar Martínez.

Cepeda belongs to 14 halls of fame, the most by any Puerto Rican athlete: the Bay Area Sports Hall of Fame (1990), Puerto Rico Baseball Hall of Fame (1991), Laredo Latin American International Sports Hall of Fame (1995), Santurce Hall of Fame (1997), Puerto Rico Sports Hall of Fame (1993), Baseball Hall of Fame, Cooperstown (1999), Missouri Sports Hall of Fame (2000), Guayama Hall of Fame (2000), Ponce Hall of Fame (2001), Cataño Hall of Fame (2002), Hispanic Heritage Baseball Museum Hall of Fame (2002), African American Ethnic Sports Hall of Fame (2007), San Francisco Giants Hall of Fame (2008) and Latinoamerican Baseball Hall of Fame (2010).

Cepeda was recognized nationally for his humanitarian efforts as an ambassador for baseball. He served as an honorary spokesman for the Crohn's and Colitis Foundation of America.

In 2001, he won the Ernie Banks Positive Image Lifetime Achievement Award. The citation for the award reads, in part, "The legacy he is leaving is an impressive one indeed. His commitment to community service includes credentials for a Humanitarian Hall of Fame. He is now recognized nationally for his humanitarian efforts as an ambassador for baseball and the San Francisco Giants." It goes on to list many of his national and community contributions, including his regular visits to inner-city schools throughout the country in conjunction with HOPE: Helping Other People Excel. "Each December, Orlando tours as part of the Giants Christmas Caravan visiting hospitals, schools and youth groups including the UC San Francisco Medical Center pediatric cancer ward. He was a participant in Athletes Against AIDS. He was also a public speaker for the Omega Boys and Girls Club, counseling at-risk children in the San Francisco community. He was revered in the local community and a local band has a song that celebrates him.

The Giants retired Cepeda's number 30 in 1999. It hangs on the facing of the upper deck in the left field corner of Oracle Park. On September 6, 2008, the Giants unveiled a life-size statue of Cepeda at the northern corner of the stadium in recognition of his status as one of the greatest Giants of all time. He was the fifth Giant to be honored with a statue; the other players are Willie Mays, Willie McCovey, Juan Marichal, and Gaylord Perry.

Cepeda continued to be a part of the Giants front office staff and was often involved with the team's spring training activities.

He was also recognized at Ponce's Parque de los Ponceños Ilustres in the area of sports.

== Personal life ==
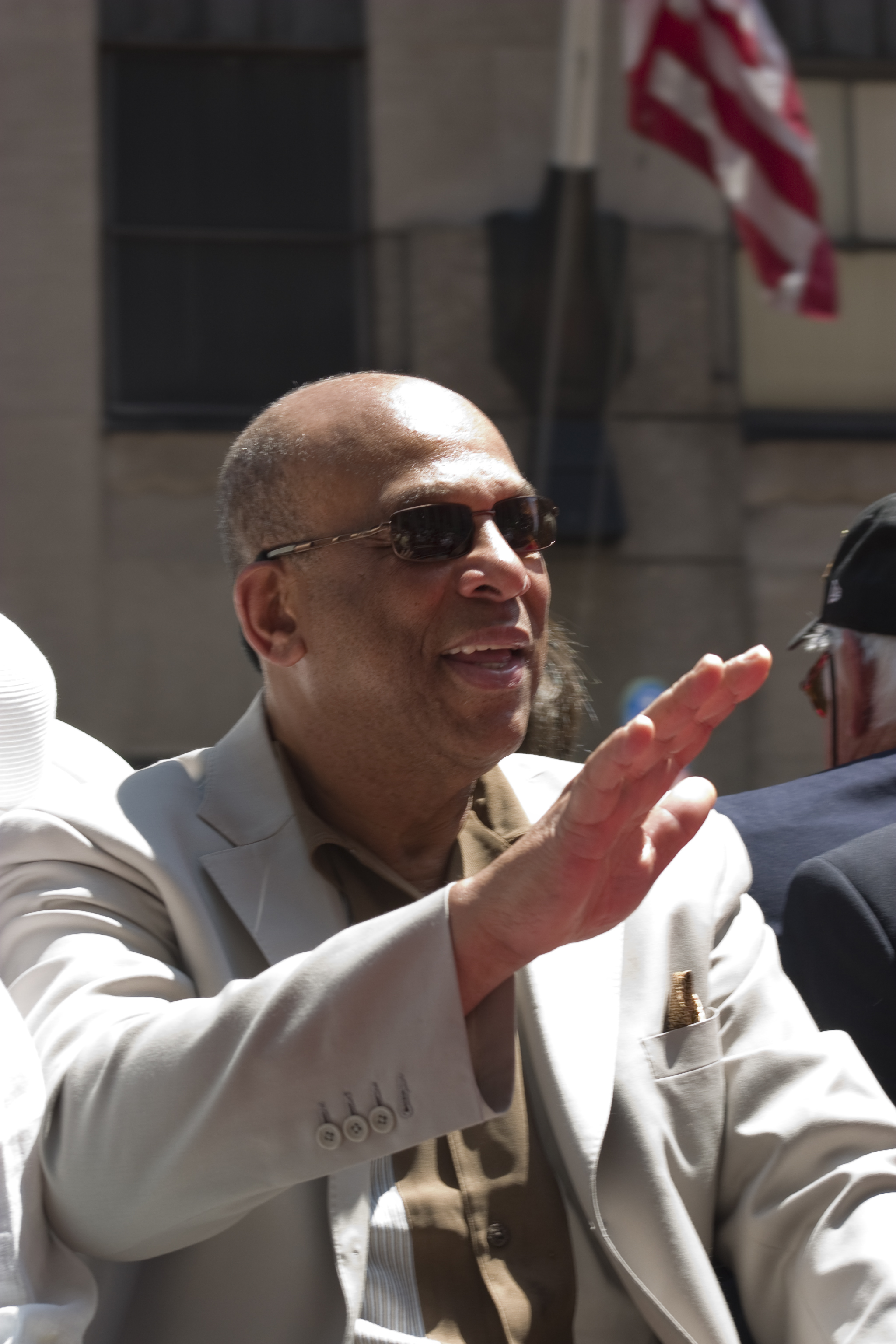
Cepeda in 2008

On December 3, 1960, Cepeda married Annie Pino in a ceremony that took place in a small church of San Juan. This was followed by a large reception at the Caribe Hilton Hotel. He and Pino divorced in 1973.

After the couple separated, he met Nydia Fernandez, who was from Carolina, Puerto Rico. The couple married in 1975, and had two children together, Malcom and Ali. Cepeda also had two other sons, Orlando Cepeda Jr. and Carl Cepeda.

A former Catholic, Cepeda began practicing Nichiren Buddhism as a member of the Buddhist association Soka Gakkai International in 1983. One year later, he moved to Los Angeles, renting an apartment in Burbank. During this timeframe, his relationship with Fernandez deteriorated. She eventually left the house and returned to Puerto Rico with Malcom and Ali and filed a divorce suit. A friend introduced Cepeda to Miriam Ortiz, whom he eventually married. Miriam died in 2017.

=== Health issues and death ===
Cepeda was hospitalized in February 2018 after a fall. He suffered what was called a "cardiac episode and head injury" and a stroke after falling in a parking lot at the Rancho Solano Golf Course complex in Fairfield, California. He was hospitalized for several months before being released.

In 2020, Cepeda sued his daughter-in-law (Camile/Ali’s wife) alleging "elder financial abuse, fraud, negligence in handling his finances after he granted her power of attorney in 2018, and infliction of emotional distress." He also denied suffering from dementia.

Cepeda died on June 28, 2024, at the age of 86. He was buried next to his mother at Juncos Old Municipal Cemetery in Juncos, Puerto Rico. His death occurred 10 days after that of his former teammate Willie Mays.

== See also ==
- List of Afro-Latinos
- List of Major League Baseball annual runs batted in leaders
- List of Major League Baseball annual home run leaders
- List of Major League Baseball annual doubles leaders
- List of Major League Baseball career home run leaders
- List of Major League Baseball career hits leaders
- List of Major League Baseball career doubles leaders
- List of Major League Baseball career runs scored leaders
- List of Major League Baseball career runs batted in leaders
- List of Major League Baseball players from Puerto Rico

Awards and achievements
Preceded by Jim Ray Hart	Major League Player of the Month; August 1967	Succeeded by Don Drysdale
