= Forfeit (baseball) =

Automatic ending of a game after play can't continue

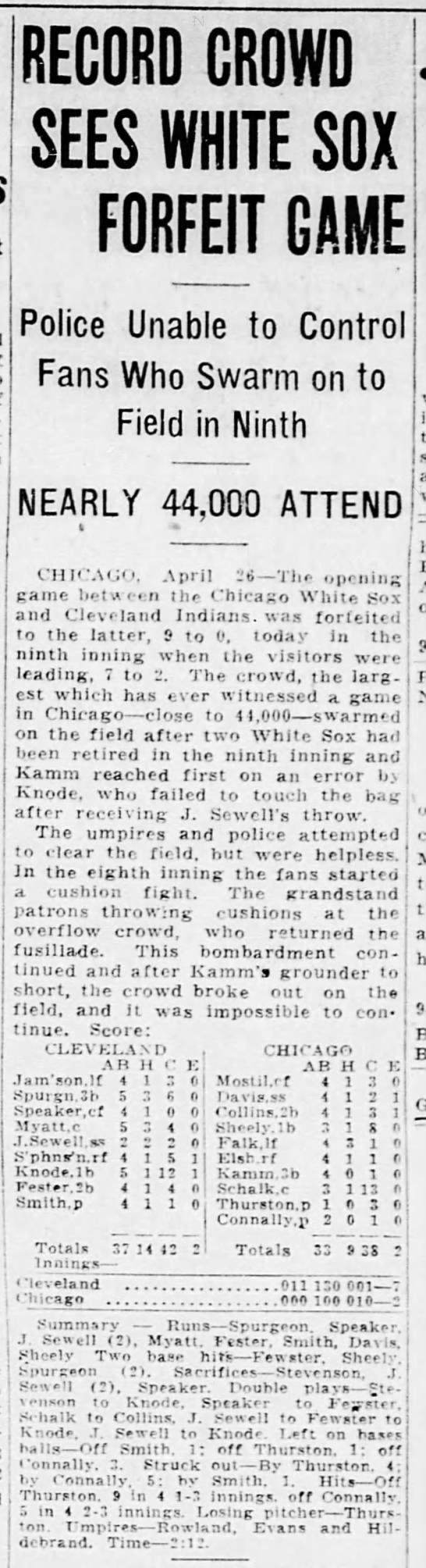
Newspaper report of a game that the Chicago White Sox forfeited to the Cleveland Indians on April 26, 1925

In rare cases, baseball games are forfeited. A forfeiture may occur when a club is no longer able or willing to play, or when the game cannot be completed in a safe and/or timely manner and one of the participating teams is deemed culpable for the stoppage of play.

Although not uncommon in baseball's early days, forfeits are now rare. There have been only five forfeits in Major League Baseball (MLB) since 1954; the last forfeit was in 1995, and prior to that, 1979. Since 1914, there has only been one incident where a team deliberately made a decision to forfeit a game, by the 1977 Baltimore Orioles.

== Usage ==
In the event of forfeiture in Major League Baseball (MLB), the score is recorded as 9–0, as stated in rule 2.00 of the Official Baseball Rules issued by the league. The 9–0 score equates to one run per each regulation game inning not played. Actual game statistics are recorded as they stand at the time of the forfeit; the game is recorded as a loss in the standings for the forfeiting team and a win for the other team, even if the forfeiting team is ahead at that point. Leagues with seven-inning games, such as high school baseball or softball, generally award a rule-based score of 7–0. The same is true for Little League Baseball, per Rule 2.00, under the definition of "Forfeit", there is one run allocated per inning, resulting in scores of 6–0 or 7–0, depending on the division. If a game is already official (in an MLB game, this means if five innings were played, or 4 1/2 innings if the home team is ahead) and the non-forfeiting team is ahead, then pitchers are credited for a win and loss using the same criteria as if the game were called for any other reason (such as weather); otherwise, no pitcher will be credited for a win, nor charged with a loss.

In college baseball, the NCAA has the authority to retroactively vacate results if the winning team is found to have violated NCAA rules; however although this is sometimes considered a retroactive "forfeiture" by fans and media, this is not actually the case, as for the losing team the loss is not retroactively changed to a win. The vacating of results is pursuant to a general NCAA rule that is not exclusive to baseball. In the NCAA, regardless of the sport, wins are usually vacated retroactively as a consequence of recruiting violations, if players or teams are caught violating the NCAA's strict rules regarding amateurism or if one or more players are otherwise found to have been ineligible to play for some reason. Retroactive forfeiture can happen for Little League World Series games, and occurred following the 1992 and 2014 events, in both cases after the offending teams were found to have fielded players in violation of age or residency restrictions.

== MLB forfeits ==
=== Before 1960 ===
In the early days of the major leagues, forfeits were not rare. In 1871, six games were forfeited in two months. There was at least one forfeit almost every year from 1882 until 1909. 1884 saw forfeits in the double digits, many because one team failed to appear for a game or refused to continue playing. Game 2 of the 1885 World Series was forfeited when St. Louis pulled its team from the field to protest the umpiring. There were five forfeits in the National League in 1886.

Sometimes teams would forfeit games if they lacked enough players to take the field. During the 19th century, major league club rosters were typically much smaller than today since owners were often reluctant to spend more than absolutely necessary on payroll. Moreover, the fastest means of communication and transportation between cities was telegraph and railroad respectively, thus teams often could not replace players who became unavailable for whatever reason for several days. In addition, prior to the 20th century it was not uncommon for businessmen to outright own more than one team (or at least to have financial interests in multiple teams), obvious conflicts of interest that would later be prohibited. Often, such owners would unscrupulously transfer players from a weaker team to a stronger one, sometimes without regard to whether the weaker team would have enough players to play upcoming games. Particularly if the team was also floundering at the gate, ownership interests sometimes disregarded such considerations and forfeited one or more game(s).

The high rate of forfeits slowed after 1910, with one forfeit every few years. Game 7 of the 1934 World Series was in jeopardy of being forfeited when Detroit Tigers fans began showering the outfield with debris after St. Louis Cardinals left fielder Joe Medwick slid hard into Tigers third baseman Marv Owen. A potential blemish to the Series was averted when Commissioner Kenesaw Mountain Landis ordered both Medwick and Owen replaced in the one-sided game.

In games that were played before the advent of stadium lighting (and/or were subject to a relatively early curfew), forfeits were also sometimes declared as a result of a team's stalling tactics. A baseball game scheduled for nine innings is not official until five innings have been completed, or 4 1/2 innings if the home team is winning. Consequently, a team that was behind by a considerable number of runs before the end of the fifth inning might deliberately slow down the game, in the hopes that darkness or the curfew would come before the game was declared official—this was because for most of baseball history, games ended before becoming official were re-played from the beginning at a later date. Such deliberate attempts to slow down play are subject to a forfeiture being declared. The last such major-league incident took place in 1954. On July 18, the visiting Philadelphia Phillies were leading the hometown St. Louis Cardinals, 8–1, in the fifth inning of the second game of a doubleheader. With darkness approaching and the game not yet official, Cardinals manager Eddie Stanky brought in three new pitchers in the inning. Umpire Babe Pinelli, citing an unnecessary delay of the game on the part of the Cardinals, forfeited the game to the Phillies. Starting with the 2020 season, MLB now more broadly uses suspended games, to avoid re-playing games from the beginning.

There are three known instances when MLB games were initially ruled a forfeit by umpires but the ruling was later overturned. Each occurred in the latter part of the season, in 1913 (later played to completion), in 1918 (doubleheader left unplayed), and in 1939 (set to be played to completion, but rained out and left as a tie). None had an effect on the postseason.

=== Since 1960 ===
Forfeits have become extremely rare in MLB. The advent of night baseball eliminated the use of stalling tactics to beat the sunset, and any curfews still in force are much more lenient than in the past (for example, only prohibiting innings from starting after 1 am, long after a game is likely to be official). In the sort of extraordinary circumstances that would warrant a more stringent curfew in a city scheduled to host MLB games (such as the 1989 San Francisco earthquake), it is extremely unlikely that MLB would allow the game(s) to be played. In such cases, MLB typically reschedules the game(s) or moves the game(s) to the opponents' stadium or a neutral venue. In one exceptional case, when the 2015 Baltimore protests caused local authorities to impose a curfew, MLB satisfied the terms of the curfew by ordering the affected game to be played earlier in the day and without spectators.

Finally, major league rosters today are of a standard size with ample personnel to replace sick or injured players, and the modern minor league farm system as well as modern transportation and communication infrastructure allows teams to rapidly replace players unavailable for a longer period, meaning it is extremely unlikely that a team would be unable to play a game due to lack of players. During the COVID-19 pandemic, when teams occasionally had multiple players unable to play without warning, MLB opted for a policy of rescheduling games rather than forcing affected teams to forfeit.

Of the five forfeits that have occurred in the expansion era of baseball (post-1960), all but one have been the result of fans disrupting the game to a point where the stadium staff cannot control them, at which point the home team is forced to forfeit.

- Washington Senators' final game at RFK Stadium: On September 30, 1971, the home team led the New York Yankees by 7–5 with two outs in the top of the ninth inning. Senators fans were angered by the team's impending move to Dallas–Fort Worth, where the Senators were to become the Texas Rangers in 1972. Apparently unaware that there was one out left in the game, spectators began to storm the field and vandalize the stadium. With no prospect of order being restored after the security staff had simply left during the game, resulting in thousands of people walking in without paying, the umpires forfeited the game to the Yankees.
- Ten Cent Beer Night: A promotion held by the Cleveland Indians on June 4, 1974, backfired when intoxicated Cleveland fans ran onto the field and attacked Texas Rangers outfielder Jeff Burroughs with the score tied 5–5 in the ninth inning. This led to a riot in which the drunk and rowdy fans, armed with an array of improvised weapons and various other objects, including chunks of the stadium seating, brawled with players and officials from both teams as well as with the umpires, who subsequently forfeited the game to Texas.
- During the September 15, 1977, game between the Baltimore Orioles and Toronto Blue Jays at Exhibition Stadium, the grounds crew placed a tarpaulin over the two mounds in the Blue Jays' bullpen, which was in foul territory, outside the left field foul line after light rain. Before the start of the bottom of the fifth inning (with the Blue Jays leading 4–0), Orioles manager Earl Weaver came out of the dugout and claimed to umpire Marty Springstead that the tarp endangered his players by exposing them to the risk that they could slip or trip on it when entering the bullpen to catch a fly ball; Weaver ordered his team from the field, and said that they would not return until the tarp was removed. Springstead ordered the tarp removed from the mound that was closest to fair territory, but not the tarp from the other mound, and told Weaver that he could play the game under protest. After arguing with Springstead for nearly 20 minutes, Weaver returned to the dugout. Springstead then waited five minutes (the period of time specified by the rule book) for the Orioles to retake the field. When Weaver said they would not do so, Springstead ordered the game forfeited to the Blue Jays.
- Disco Demolition Night: On July 12, 1979, the Chicago White Sox held a promotion in which Chicago radio personality Steve Dahl came onto the field to blow up a box full of disco records between games of a doubleheader with the Detroit Tigers. After the box was blown up, rowdy and intoxicated fans who had packed Comiskey Park beyond capacity stormed the field, engaged in various acts of vandalism and theft, and did not leave the field until Chicago police arrived in full riot gear. The field was so badly damaged that the umpires and managers decided the second game could not be played. American League president Lee MacPhail later forfeited the second game to the Tigers, ruling that the White Sox had failed to provide acceptable playing conditions.
- On August 10, 1995, the Los Angeles Dodgers gave out baseballs to paying customers as they entered the Dodger Stadium gates for a game against the St. Louis Cardinals. Fans interrupted the game in the seventh inning when they threw these baseballs onto the field. In the eighth inning, Dodger first baseman Eric Karros was ejected for arguing balls and strikes, and in the bottom of the ninth inning, with the Cardinals leading 2–1, when the first Dodgers batter, Raúl Mondesí, was called out on strikes and ejected by home plate umpire Jim Quick for arguing, followed by Dodger manager Tommy Lasorda moments later for arguing with and abusing Quick. Dodger fans, fueled by a series of close calls, again threw their souvenir baseballs onto the field. The Cardinals left the field due to safety concerns, causing a several-minute delay, but when the Cardinals returned to the field, Dodgers fans threw more balls out of the center field bleachers, forcing the umpires to forfeit the game to St. Louis. As a result of this incident, MLB ruled that in any future promotional giveaways of baseballs or any other throwable object, the items would be given out as fans exited the stadium.
